= 2015 ITF Women's Circuit (July–September) =

Second tier tour for women's professional tennis

The 2015 ITF Women's Circuit is the 2015 edition of the second-tier tour for women's professional tennis. It is organised by the International Tennis Federation and is a tier below the WTA Tour. The ITF Women's Circuit includes tournaments with prize money ranging from $10,000 up to $100,000.

== Key ==
$100,000 tournaments
$75,000 tournaments
$50,000 tournaments
$25,000 tournaments
$15,000 tournaments
$10,000 tournaments

== Month ==
=== July ===
Week of	Tournament	Winner	Runners-up	Semifinalists	Quarterfinalists
July 6	Lorraine Open 88; Contrexéville, France; Clay $100,000; Singles – Doubles	(Romania) Alexandra Dulgheru; 6–3, 1–6, 7–5	(Kazakhstan) Yulia Putintseva	(Brazil) Teliana Pereira (Montenegro) Danka Kovinić	(Spain) Lourdes Domínguez Lino (Switzerland) Stefanie Vögele (Romania) Sorana Cîrstea (Czech Republic) Tereza Smitková
July 6	Lorraine Open 88; Contrexéville, France; Clay $100,000; Singles – Doubles	(Georgia (country)) Oksana Kalashnikova (Montenegro) Danka Kovinić; 2–6, 6–3, [10–6]	(France) Irina Ramialison (France) Constance Sibille	(Brazil) Teliana Pereira (Montenegro) Danka Kovinić	(Spain) Lourdes Domínguez Lino (Switzerland) Stefanie Vögele (Romania) Sorana Cîrstea (Czech Republic) Tereza Smitková
July 6	Reinert Open; Versmold, Germany; Clay $50,000; Singles – Doubles	(Germany) Carina Witthöft; 6–3, 6–3	(Sweden) Johanna Larsson	(Germany) Laura Siegemund (Liechtenstein) Stephanie Vogt	(Netherlands) Richèl Hogenkamp (Germany) Anna-Lena Friedsam (Germany) Anne Schäfer (Switzerland) Conny Perrin
July 6	Reinert Open; Versmold, Germany; Clay $50,000; Singles – Doubles	(Czech Republic) Eva Hrdinová (Israel) Shahar Pe'er; 6–1, 6–3	(Ukraine) Alona Fomina (Ukraine) Sofiya Kovalets	(Germany) Laura Siegemund (Liechtenstein) Stephanie Vogt	(Netherlands) Richèl Hogenkamp (Germany) Anna-Lena Friedsam (Germany) Anne Schäfer (Switzerland) Conny Perrin
July 6	Bursa Cup; Bursa, Turkey; Clay $50,000; Singles – Doubles	(Turkey) İpek Soylu; 7–5, 3–6, 6–1	(Latvia) Anastasija Sevastova	(Russia) Elizaveta Kulichkova (Georgia (country)) Sofia Shapatava	(Spain) Laura Pous Tió (Croatia) Jana Fett (Czech Republic) Barbora Krejčíková (China) Zhang Shuai
July 6	Bursa Cup; Bursa, Turkey; Clay $50,000; Singles – Doubles	(Russia) Marina Melnikova (Spain) Laura Pous Tió; 6–4, 6–4	(Georgia (country)) Sofia Shapatava (Ukraine) Anastasiya Vasylyeva	(Russia) Elizaveta Kulichkova (Georgia (country)) Sofia Shapatava	(Spain) Laura Pous Tió (Croatia) Jana Fett (Czech Republic) Barbora Krejčíková (China) Zhang Shuai
July 6	Turin, Italy; Clay $25,000; Singles and doubles draws	(France) Alizé Lim; 3–6, 6–4, 6–4	(Bulgaria) Dia Evtimova	(Switzerland) Romina Oprandi (United States) Bernarda Pera	(Italy) Georgia Brescia (Austria) Lisa-Maria Moser (Italy) Giulia Gatto-Monticone (Sweden) Cornelia Lister
July 6	Turin, Italy; Clay $25,000; Singles and doubles draws	(Switzerland) Xenia Knoll (Italy) Alice Matteucci; 6–2, 7–5	(Sweden) Susanne Celik (Latvia) Diāna Marcinkēviča	(Switzerland) Romina Oprandi (United States) Bernarda Pera	(Italy) Georgia Brescia (Austria) Lisa-Maria Moser (Italy) Giulia Gatto-Monticone (Sweden) Cornelia Lister
July 6	Bangkok, Thailand; Hard $25,000; Singles and doubles draws	(China) Wang Qiang; 6–2, 6–4	(China) Zhang Kailin	(China) Han Xinyun (Japan) Miyu Kato	(Hong Kong) Zhang Ling (Japan) Erika Sema (Japan) Junri Namigata (Japan) Riko Sawayanagi
July 6	Bangkok, Thailand; Hard $25,000; Singles and doubles draws	(China) Han Xinyun (China) Zhang Kailin; 6–3, 6–4	(Japan) Kanae Hisami (Japan) Kotomi Takahata	(China) Han Xinyun (Japan) Miyu Kato	(Hong Kong) Zhang Ling (Japan) Erika Sema (Japan) Junri Namigata (Japan) Riko Sawayanagi
July 6	Knokke, Belgium; Clay $10,000; Singles and doubles draws	(Russia) Polina Leykina; 6–4, 6–2	(Belgium) Sofie Oyen	(Belgium) Steffi Distelmans (Australia) Sally Peers	(Belgium) Nina Van Oost (Hungary) Anna Bondár (Belgium) Hélène Scholsen (Belgium) Elyne Boeykens
July 6	Knokke, Belgium; Clay $10,000; Singles and doubles draws	(Belgium) Elyne Boeykens (Netherlands) Kelly Versteeg; 6–2, 6–4	(Australia) Sally Peers (Belgium) Kimberley Zimmermann	(Belgium) Steffi Distelmans (Australia) Sally Peers	(Belgium) Nina Van Oost (Hungary) Anna Bondár (Belgium) Hélène Scholsen (Belgium) Elyne Boeykens
July 6	Sharm el-Sheikh, Egypt; Hard $10,000; Singles and doubles draws	(Australia) Astra Sharma; 6–3, 2–6, 6–0	(Egypt) Ola Abou Zekry	(Russia) Margarita Lazareva (Germany) Amelie Intert	(Greece) Eleni Kordolaimi (Italy) Giorgia Pinto (Germany) Luisa Marie Huber (Ukraine) Katya Malikova
July 6	Sharm el-Sheikh, Egypt; Hard $10,000; Singles and doubles draws	(Egypt) Ola Abou Zekry (India) Shweta Rana; 6–3, 4–6, [10–7]	(Russia) Varvara Kuznetsova (Ukraine) Katya Malikova	(Russia) Margarita Lazareva (Germany) Amelie Intert	(Greece) Eleni Kordolaimi (Italy) Giorgia Pinto (Germany) Luisa Marie Huber (Ukraine) Katya Malikova
July 6	Telavi, Georgia; Clay $10,000; Singles and doubles draws	(Russia) Anastasia Gasanova; 6–3, 6–4	(Russia) Amina Anshba	(Russia) Adeliya Zabirova (Serbia) Tamara Čurović	(Georgia (country)) Tinatin Kavlashvili (Russia) Alexandra Dubrovina (Russia) Anastasia Chikalkina (Hungary) Csilla Argyelán
July 6	Telavi, Georgia; Clay $10,000; Singles and doubles draws	(Armenia) Ani Amiraghyan (China) Chen Chaoyi; 6–3, 6–0	(Russia) Anastasia Gasanova (Russia) Adeliya Zabirova	(Russia) Adeliya Zabirova (Serbia) Tamara Čurović	(Georgia (country)) Tinatin Kavlashvili (Russia) Alexandra Dubrovina (Russia) Anastasia Chikalkina (Hungary) Csilla Argyelán
July 6	Amstelveen, Netherlands; Clay $10,000; Singles and doubles draws	(Netherlands) Bibiane Weijers; 6–4, 3–6, 6–1	(Denmark) Karen Barbat	(Czech Republic) Petra Krejsová (Brazil) Laura Pigossi	(Netherlands) Jainy Scheepens (Netherlands) Chayenne Ewijk (Netherlands) Mandy Wagemaker (Germany) Linda Prenkovic
July 6	Amstelveen, Netherlands; Clay $10,000; Singles and doubles draws	(Netherlands) Rosalie van der Hoek (Netherlands) Janneke Wikkerink; 6–2, 6–1	(United States) Tina Tehrani (Netherlands) Mandy Wagemaker	(Czech Republic) Petra Krejsová (Brazil) Laura Pigossi	(Netherlands) Jainy Scheepens (Netherlands) Chayenne Ewijk (Netherlands) Mandy Wagemaker (Germany) Linda Prenkovic
July 6	Iași, Romania; Clay $10,000; Singles and doubles draws	(Moldova) Anastasia Vdovenco; 6–1, 6–7^{(3–7)}, 6–3	(Romania) Simona Ionescu	(Romania) Ágnes Szatmári (Romania) Oana Georgeta Simion	(Argentina) Daniela Farfán (Romania) Irina Fetecău (Romania) Andreea Roșca (Romania) Teodora Stîngă
July 6	Iași, Romania; Clay $10,000; Singles and doubles draws	(Romania) Ioana Loredana Roșca (Romania) Oana Georgeta Simion; 6–3, 7–5	(Ukraine) Maryna Kolb (Ukraine) Nadiya Kolb	(Romania) Ágnes Szatmári (Romania) Oana Georgeta Simion	(Argentina) Daniela Farfán (Romania) Irina Fetecău (Romania) Andreea Roșca (Romania) Teodora Stîngă
July 6	Getxo, Spain; Clay $10,000; Singles and doubles draws	(Spain) Aliona Bolsova Zadoinov; 6–0, 6–2	(Italy) Corinna Dentoni	(France) Laëtitia Sarrazin (Spain) Estela Pérez Somarriba	(Spain) Lucía Cervera Vázquez (Spain) Alicia Herrero Liñana (France) Camille Cheli (Spain) María Gutiérrez Carrasco
July 6	Getxo, Spain; Clay $10,000; Singles and doubles draws	(Spain) Lucía Cervera Vázquez (Australia) Alexandra Nancarrow; 6–3, 7–5	(Italy) Camilla Rosatello (France) Laëtitia Sarrazin	(France) Laëtitia Sarrazin (Spain) Estela Pérez Somarriba	(Spain) Lucía Cervera Vázquez (Spain) Alicia Herrero Liñana (France) Camille Cheli (Spain) María Gutiérrez Carrasco
July 13	ITS Cup; Olomouc, Czech Republic; Clay $50,000; Singles – Doubles	(Czech Republic) Barbora Krejčíková; 3–6, 6–4, 7–6^{(7–5)}	(Czech Republic) Petra Cetkovská	(Czech Republic) Pernilla Mendesová (Russia) Ekaterina Alexandrova	(Ukraine) Elizaveta Ianchuk (Czech Republic) Karolína Muchová (Uzbekistan) Akgul Amanmuradova (Georgia (country)) Sofia Shapatava
July 13	ITS Cup; Olomouc, Czech Republic; Clay $50,000; Singles – Doubles	(Czech Republic) Lenka Kunčíková (Czech Republic) Karolína Stuchlá; 1–6, 6–4, [12–10]	(Netherlands) Cindy Burger (Czech Republic) Kateřina Vaňková	(Czech Republic) Pernilla Mendesová (Russia) Ekaterina Alexandrova	(Ukraine) Elizaveta Ianchuk (Czech Republic) Karolína Muchová (Uzbekistan) Akgul Amanmuradova (Georgia (country)) Sofia Shapatava
July 13	Stockton Challenger; Stockton, United States; Hard $50,000; Singles – Doubles	(Japan) Nao Hibino; 6–1, 7–6^{(8–6)}	(Belgium) An-Sophie Mestach	(Japan) Kimiko Date-Krumm (United States) Sanaz Marand	(Japan) Mayo Hibi (United States) Danielle Lao (France) Amandine Hesse (United States) Melanie Oudin
July 13	Stockton Challenger; Stockton, United States; Hard $50,000; Singles – Doubles	(United States) Jamie Loeb (United States) Sanaz Marand; 6–3, 6–4	(United States) Kaitlyn Christian (United States) Danielle Lao	(Japan) Kimiko Date-Krumm (United States) Sanaz Marand	(Japan) Mayo Hibi (United States) Danielle Lao (France) Amandine Hesse (United States) Melanie Oudin
July 13	Tianjin, China; Hard $25,000; Singles and doubles draws	(China) Duan Yingying; 4–6, 7–6^{(7–2)}, 3–0, ret.	(China) Wang Qiang	(China) Lu Jingjing (China) Liu Fangzhou	(Uzbekistan) Sabina Sharipova (China) Liu Chang (India) Ankita Raina (South Korea) Han Na-lae
July 13	Tianjin, China; Hard $25,000; Singles and doubles draws	(China) Liu Wanting (China) Lu Jingjing; 6–7^{(4–7)}, 7–6^{(7–4)}, [10–4]	(China) Chen Jiahui (China) You Xiaodi	(China) Lu Jingjing (China) Liu Fangzhou	(Uzbekistan) Sabina Sharipova (China) Liu Chang (India) Ankita Raina (South Korea) Han Na-lae
July 13	Aschaffenburg, Germany; Clay $25,000; Singles and doubles draws	(Croatia) Tena Lukas; 7–5, 6–4	(France) Fiona Ferro	(Russia) Irina Khromacheva (Liechtenstein) Kathinka von Deichmann	(Georgia (country)) Sofia Kvatsabaia (Austria) Barbara Haas (Switzerland) Amra Sadiković (Germany) Antonia Lottner
July 13	Aschaffenburg, Germany; Clay $25,000; Singles and doubles draws	(Latvia) Diāna Marcinkēviča (Ukraine) Alyona Sotnikova; 3–6, 6–4, [10–5]	(Ukraine) Alona Fomina (Ukraine) Sofiya Kovalets	(Russia) Irina Khromacheva (Liechtenstein) Kathinka von Deichmann	(Georgia (country)) Sofia Kvatsabaia (Austria) Barbara Haas (Switzerland) Amra Sadiković (Germany) Antonia Lottner
July 13	Imola, Italy; Carpet $25,000; Singles and doubles draws	(United States) Bernarda Pera; 6–2, 6–3	(France) Sherazad Reix	(Ukraine) Nadiia Kichenok (Slovenia) Tadeja Majerič	(France) Océane Dodin (Germany) Sarah-Rebecca Sekulic (Switzerland) Xenia Knoll (Italy) Claudia Giovine
July 13	Imola, Italy; Carpet $25,000; Singles and doubles draws	(Italy) Claudia Giovine (Switzerland) Xenia Knoll; 7–5, 6–2	(Greece) Despina Papamichail (United States) Bernarda Pera	(Ukraine) Nadiia Kichenok (Slovenia) Tadeja Majerič	(France) Océane Dodin (Germany) Sarah-Rebecca Sekulic (Switzerland) Xenia Knoll (Italy) Claudia Giovine
July 13	Bangkok, Thailand; Hard $25,000; Singles and doubles draws	(Japan) Miyu Kato; 7–5, 6–2	(Uzbekistan) Nigina Abduraimova	(China) Zhang Kailin (Japan) Riko Sawayanagi	(Japan) Kyōka Okamura (Japan) Shuko Aoyama (Thailand) Nungnadda Wannasuk (Japan) Hiroko Kuwata
July 13	Bangkok, Thailand; Hard $25,000; Singles and doubles draws	(Japan) Akiko Omae (Japan) Erika Sema; 6–4, 3–6, [11–9]	(Japan) Kanae Hisami (Japan) Kotomi Takahata	(China) Zhang Kailin (Japan) Riko Sawayanagi	(Japan) Kyōka Okamura (Japan) Shuko Aoyama (Thailand) Nungnadda Wannasuk (Japan) Hiroko Kuwata
July 13	Nieuwpoort, Belgium; Clay $10,000; Singles and doubles draws	(Belgium) Sofie Oyen; 6–2, 6–1	(Belgium) Greet Minnen	(Czech Republic) Petra Krejsová (Belgium) Steffi Distelmans	(Russia) Maria Marfutina (Philippines) Katharina Lehnert (Germany) Anna Klasen (Russia) Polina Leykina
July 13	Nieuwpoort, Belgium; Clay $10,000; Singles and doubles draws	(Russia) Maria Marfutina (Australia) Alexandra Nancarrow; 6–0, 2–6, [10–5]	(Czech Republic) Petra Krejsová (United Kingdom) Francesca Stephenson	(Czech Republic) Petra Krejsová (Belgium) Steffi Distelmans	(Russia) Maria Marfutina (Philippines) Katharina Lehnert (Germany) Anna Klasen (Russia) Polina Leykina
July 13	Sharm el-Sheikh, Egypt; Hard $10,000; Singles and doubles draws	(Russia) Ksenia Gaydarzhi; 7–5, 3–6, 6–2	(United States) Julia Jones	(United States) Karyn Guttormsen (India) Dhruthi Tatachar Venugopal	(Zimbabwe) Valeria Bhunu (Australia) Astra Sharma (France) Victoria Muntean (Russia) Julia Valetova
July 13	Sharm el-Sheikh, Egypt; Hard $10,000; Singles and doubles draws	(Russia) Kseniia Bekker (Chinese Taipei) Cho I-hsuan; 6–3, 3–6, [10–4]	(United States) Julia Jones (Norway) Caroline Rohde-Moe	(United States) Karyn Guttormsen (India) Dhruthi Tatachar Venugopal	(Zimbabwe) Valeria Bhunu (Australia) Astra Sharma (France) Victoria Muntean (Russia) Julia Valetova
July 13	Telavi, Georgia; Clay $10,000; Singles and doubles draws	(Russia) Anastasia Gasanova; 1–6, 6–4, 6–3	(Armenia) Ani Amiraghyan	(Switzerland) Lisa Sabino (Russia) Amina Anshba	(Russia) Adeliya Zabirova (United States) Madison Bourguignon (Israel) Saray Sterenbach (Ukraine) Oleksandra Piskun
July 13	Telavi, Georgia; Clay $10,000; Singles and doubles draws	(Armenia) Ani Amiraghyan (China) Chen Chaoyi; 6–3, 6–4	(Russia) Amina Anshba (Russia) Adelina Baravi	(Switzerland) Lisa Sabino (Russia) Amina Anshba	(Russia) Adeliya Zabirova (United States) Madison Bourguignon (Israel) Saray Sterenbach (Ukraine) Oleksandra Piskun
July 13	Bursa, Turkey; Clay $10,000; Singles and doubles draws	(Bulgaria) Isabella Shinikova; 6–3, 6–4	(Argentina) Julieta Estable	(Kyrgyzstan) Ksenia Palkina (Bulgaria) Dia Evtimova	(United Kingdom) Mirabelle Njoze (Argentina) Ana Victoria Gobbi Monllau (Belarus) Sviatlana Pirazhenka (Russia) Angelina Gabueva
July 13	Bursa, Turkey; Clay $10,000; Singles and doubles draws	(Bulgaria) Dia Evtimova (Bulgaria) Isabella Shinikova; 6–2, 3–6, [10–7]	(Argentina) Ailen Crespo Azconzábal (Argentina) Ana Victoria Gobbi Monllau	(Kyrgyzstan) Ksenia Palkina (Bulgaria) Dia Evtimova	(United Kingdom) Mirabelle Njoze (Argentina) Ana Victoria Gobbi Monllau (Belarus) Sviatlana Pirazhenka (Russia) Angelina Gabueva
July 20	Challenger Banque Nationale de Granby; Granby, Canada; Hard $50,000; Singles – Doubles	(United Kingdom) Johanna Konta; 6–2, 6–4	(France) Stéphanie Foretz	(Mexico) Victoria Rodríguez (Australia) Jessica Moore	(United Kingdom) Naomi Broady (France) Julie Coin (Canada) Charlotte Robillard-Millette (United States) Ellie Halbauer
July 20	Challenger Banque Nationale de Granby; Granby, Canada; Hard $50,000; Singles – Doubles	(Australia) Jessica Moore (Australia) Storm Sanders; 7–5, 6–2	(United Kingdom) Laura Robson (Canada) Erin Routliffe	(Mexico) Victoria Rodríguez (Australia) Jessica Moore	(United Kingdom) Naomi Broady (France) Julie Coin (Canada) Charlotte Robillard-Millette (United States) Ellie Halbauer
July 20	FSP Gold River Women's Challenger; Sacramento, United States; Hard $50,000; Singles – Doubles	(Ukraine) Anhelina Kalinina; 4–6, 6–4, 6–3	(Belgium) An-Sophie Mestach	(Japan) Nao Hibino (United States) Brooke Austin	(Japan) Mayo Hibi (Japan) Kimiko Date-Krumm (United States) Catherine Bellis (United States) Robin Anderson
July 20	FSP Gold River Women's Challenger; Sacramento, United States; Hard $50,000; Singles – Doubles	(United States) Ashley Weinhold (United States) Caitlin Whoriskey; 6–4, 3–6, [14–12]	(Japan) Nao Hibino (Canada) Rosie Johanson	(Japan) Nao Hibino (United States) Brooke Austin	(Japan) Mayo Hibi (Japan) Kimiko Date-Krumm (United States) Catherine Bellis (United States) Robin Anderson
July 20	Zhengzhou, China; Hard $25,000; Singles and doubles draws	(China) Wang Yafan; 6–4, 6–4	(China) Duan Yingying	(China) Lu Jingjing (China) Xu Shilin	(China) Liang Chen (China) Tian Ran (China) Liu Fangzhou (South Korea) Jang Su-jeong
July 20	Zhengzhou, China; Hard $25,000; Singles and doubles draws	(South Korea) Han Na-lae (South Korea) Jang Su-jeong; 6–0, 6–3	(China) Liu Chang (Hong Kong) Zhang Ling	(China) Lu Jingjing (China) Xu Shilin	(China) Liang Chen (China) Tian Ran (China) Liu Fangzhou (South Korea) Jang Su-jeong
July 20	Darmstadt, Germany; Clay $25,000; Singles and doubles draws	(Belgium) Ysaline Bonaventure; 6–3, 7–6^{(7–4)}	(Slovenia) Dalila Jakupović	(France) Fiona Ferro (Switzerland) Amra Sadiković	(Croatia) Ana Vrljić (Czech Republic) Renata Voráčová (Switzerland) Viktorija Golubic (Poland) Katarzyna Kawa
July 20	Darmstadt, Germany; Clay $25,000; Singles and doubles draws	(Russia) Irina Khromacheva (Belarus) Lidziya Marozava; 6–4, 6–4	(Turkey) Pemra Özgen (Germany) Anne Schäfer	(France) Fiona Ferro (Switzerland) Amra Sadiković	(Croatia) Ana Vrljić (Czech Republic) Renata Voráčová (Switzerland) Viktorija Golubic (Poland) Katarzyna Kawa
July 20	Hong Kong; Hard $15,000; Singles and doubles draws	(Japan) Ayaka Okuno; 6–4, 6–0	(India) Prerna Bhambri	(Japan) Makoto Ninomiya (Indonesia) Beatrice Gumulya	(Japan) Mai Minokoshi (Japan) Sachie Ishizu (South Korea) Choi Ji-hee (Israel) Keren Shlomo
July 20	Hong Kong; Hard $15,000; Singles and doubles draws	(South Korea) Choi Ji-hee (South Korea) Lee So-ra; 6–2, 6–2	(Hong Kong) Eudice Chong (Hong Kong) Katherine Ip	(Japan) Makoto Ninomiya (Indonesia) Beatrice Gumulya	(Japan) Mai Minokoshi (Japan) Sachie Ishizu (South Korea) Choi Ji-hee (Israel) Keren Shlomo
July 20	Bad Waltersdorf, Austria; Clay $10,000; Singles and doubles draws	(Czech Republic) Zuzana Zálabská; 5–7, 7–5, 6–1	(Czech Republic) Diana Šumová	(Slovakia) Natália Vajdová (Russia) Maria Marfutina	(Germany) Natalia Siedliska (Germany) Julia Thiem (Czech Republic) Karolína Muchová (Slovakia) Nikola Vajdová
July 20	Bad Waltersdorf, Austria; Clay $10,000; Singles and doubles draws	(United States) Natalie Suk (Czech Republic) Anna Vrbenská; 6–1, 7–5	(Austria) Nikola Hofmanova (Austria) Janina Toljan	(Slovakia) Natália Vajdová (Russia) Maria Marfutina	(Germany) Natalia Siedliska (Germany) Julia Thiem (Czech Republic) Karolína Muchová (Slovakia) Nikola Vajdová
July 20	Maaseik, Belgium; Clay $10,000; Singles and doubles draws	(Russia) Natela Dzalamidze; 6–1, 5–7, 6–1	(Argentina) Catalina Pella	(Australia) Sally Peers (Argentina) Guadalupe Pérez Rojas	(United States) Tina Tehrani (Belgium) Sofie Oyen (Netherlands) Kelly Versteeg (Netherlands) Mandy Wagemaker
July 20	Maaseik, Belgium; Clay $10,000; Singles and doubles draws	(Belgium) Steffi Distelmans (Netherlands) Kelly Versteeg; 6–1, 7–6^{(7–4)}	(Germany) Katharina Hering (Germany) Lisa Matviyenko	(Australia) Sally Peers (Argentina) Guadalupe Pérez Rojas	(United States) Tina Tehrani (Belgium) Sofie Oyen (Netherlands) Kelly Versteeg (Netherlands) Mandy Wagemaker
July 20	Sharm el-Sheikh, Egypt; Hard $10,000; Singles and doubles draws	(United States) Julia Jones; 6–3, 6–4	(Italy) Giada Clerici	(India) Dhruthi Tatachar Venugopal (Russia) Margarita Lazareva	(Spain) Irene Burillo Escorihuela (France) Victoria Muntean (Bosnia and Herzegovina) Jasmina Tinjić (Denmark) Cecilie Melsted
July 20	Sharm el-Sheikh, Egypt; Hard $10,000; Singles and doubles draws	(Russia) Margarita Lazareva (Ukraine) Valeriya Strakhova; 6–3, 6–1	(Russia) Kseniia Bekker (India) Dhruthi Tatachar Venugopal	(India) Dhruthi Tatachar Venugopal (Russia) Margarita Lazareva	(Spain) Irene Burillo Escorihuela (France) Victoria Muntean (Bosnia and Herzegovina) Jasmina Tinjić (Denmark) Cecilie Melsted
July 20	Tampere Open; Tampere, Finland; Clay $10,000; Singles and doubles draws	(Hungary) Lilla Barzó; 6–2, 6–4	(Denmark) Karen Barbat	(United States) Sabrina Santamaria (Romania) Cristina Ene	(Bosnia and Herzegovina) Dea Herdželaš (Russia) Alena Tarasova (Germany) Julia Wachaczyk (Belgium) Hélène Scholsen
July 20	Tampere Open; Tampere, Finland; Clay $10,000; Singles and doubles draws	(Germany) Nora Niedmers (Belgium) Hélène Scholsen; 6–4, 7–6^{(7–5)}	(Romania) Cristina Ene (Bosnia and Herzegovina) Dea Herdželaš	(United States) Sabrina Santamaria (Romania) Cristina Ene	(Bosnia and Herzegovina) Dea Herdželaš (Russia) Alena Tarasova (Germany) Julia Wachaczyk (Belgium) Hélène Scholsen
July 20	Les Contamines-Montjoie, France; Hard $10,000; Singles and doubles draws	(France) Sherazad Reix; 7–6^{(7–2)}, 6–0	(France) Théo Gravouil	(France) Anaïs Van Cauter (France) Elixane Lechemia	(Ukraine) Elizaveta Ianchuk (Slovakia) Michaela Hončová (France) Margot Decker (Republic of Ireland) Amy Bowtell
July 20	Les Contamines-Montjoie, France; Hard $10,000; Singles and doubles draws	(Slovakia) Michaela Hončová (France) Sherazad Reix; 6–3, 6–4	(Italy) Georgia Brescia (Netherlands) Erika Vogelsang	(France) Anaïs Van Cauter (France) Elixane Lechemia	(Ukraine) Elizaveta Ianchuk (Slovakia) Michaela Hončová (France) Margot Decker (Republic of Ireland) Amy Bowtell
July 20	Viserba, Italy; Clay $10,000; Singles and doubles draws	(Italy) Alice Balducci; 6–3, 6–2	(Russia) Marina Shamayko	(United Kingdom) Amanda Carreras (Italy) Camilla Scala	(Italy) Stefania Rubini (Italy) Alice Savoretti (Italy) Martina Spigarelli (Italy) Martina Caregaro
July 20	Viserba, Italy; Clay $10,000; Singles and doubles draws	(United Kingdom) Amanda Carreras (Italy) Alice Savoretti; 6–3, 3–6, [10–3]	(Italy) Martina Di Giuseppe (Italy) Giorgia Marchetti	(United Kingdom) Amanda Carreras (Italy) Camilla Scala	(Italy) Stefania Rubini (Italy) Alice Savoretti (Italy) Martina Spigarelli (Italy) Martina Caregaro
July 20	Târgu Jiu, Romania; Clay $10,000; Singles and doubles draws	(Romania) Ioana Loredana Roșca; 6–2, 4–6, 6–3	(Romania) Nicoleta Dascălu	(Argentina) Julieta Estable (France) Marine Partaud	(Romania) Irina Fetecău (Romania) Ana Bianca Mihăilă (Romania) Simona Ionescu (Argentina) Ana Victoria Gobbi Monllau
July 20	Târgu Jiu, Romania; Clay $10,000; Singles and doubles draws	(Romania) Raluca Ciufrila (Romania) Ioana Loredana Roșca; 4–6, 7–6^{(7–4)}, [10–6]	(Argentina) Julieta Estable (Argentina) Daniela Farfán	(Argentina) Julieta Estable (France) Marine Partaud	(Romania) Irina Fetecău (Romania) Ana Bianca Mihăilă (Romania) Simona Ionescu (Argentina) Ana Victoria Gobbi Monllau
July 20	Palić, Serbia; Clay $10,000; Singles and doubles draws	(Australia) Alexandra Nancarrow; 6–1, 6–4	(Slovakia) Zuzana Zlochová	(Czech Republic) Tereza Malíková (Czech Republic) Natálie Novotná	(Slovakia) Martina Okáľová (Croatia) Ana Savić (Slovakia) Barbara Kötelesová (Italy) Miriana Tona
July 20	Palić, Serbia; Clay $10,000; Singles and doubles draws	(Czech Republic) Nina Holanová (Slovakia) Barbara Kötelesová; 6–3, 5–7, [10–6]	(Serbia) Dajana Dukić (Australia) Alexandra Nancarrow	(Czech Republic) Tereza Malíková (Czech Republic) Natálie Novotná	(Slovakia) Martina Okáľová (Croatia) Ana Savić (Slovakia) Barbara Kötelesová (Italy) Miriana Tona
July 20	Evansville, United States; Hard $10,000; Singles and doubles draws	(United States) Lauren Herring; 4–6, 6–2, 6–0	(United States) Andie Daniell	(United States) Alexa Graham (Norway) Ulrikke Eikeri	(United States) Frances Altick (Dominican Republic) Francesca Segarelli (United States) Josie Kuhlman (United States) Sara Daavettila
July 20	Evansville, United States; Hard $10,000; Singles and doubles draws	(Thailand) Nicha Lertpitaksinchai (Thailand) Peangtarn Plipuech; 6–2, 6–3	(United States) Lauren Herring (United States) Kennedy Shaffer	(United States) Alexa Graham (Norway) Ulrikke Eikeri	(United States) Frances Altick (Dominican Republic) Francesca Segarelli (United States) Josie Kuhlman (United States) Sara Daavettila
July 27	Powiat Poznański Open; Sobota, Poland; Clay $75,000; Singles – Doubles	(Czech Republic) Petra Cetkovská; 3–6, 7–5, 6–2	(Latvia) Jeļena Ostapenko	(Czech Republic) Martina Borecká (Netherlands) Kiki Bertens	(Czech Republic) Nicole Vaidišová (Netherlands) Richèl Hogenkamp (Tunisia) Ons Jabeur (Czech Republic) Barbora Krejčíková
July 27	Powiat Poznański Open; Sobota, Poland; Clay $75,000; Singles – Doubles	(Netherlands) Kiki Bertens (Netherlands) Richèl Hogenkamp; 7–6^{(7–2)}, 6–4	(Sweden) Cornelia Lister (Latvia) Jeļena Ostapenko	(Czech Republic) Martina Borecká (Netherlands) Kiki Bertens	(Czech Republic) Nicole Vaidišová (Netherlands) Richèl Hogenkamp (Tunisia) Ons Jabeur (Czech Republic) Barbora Krejčíková
July 27	Kentucky Bank Tennis Championships; Lexington, United States; Hard $50,000; Singles – Doubles	(Japan) Nao Hibino; 6–2, 6–1	(United States) Samantha Crawford	(France) Julie Coin (France) Amandine Hesse	(France) Manon Arcangioli (United States) Jennifer Brady (Ukraine) Anhelina Kalinina (United States) Nicole Frenkel
July 27	Kentucky Bank Tennis Championships; Lexington, United States; Hard $50,000; Singles – Doubles	(Japan) Nao Hibino (United Kingdom) Emily Webley-Smith; 6–2, 6–2	(Thailand) Nicha Lertpitaksinchai (Thailand) Peangtarn Plipuech	(France) Julie Coin (France) Amandine Hesse	(France) Manon Arcangioli (United States) Jennifer Brady (Ukraine) Anhelina Kalinina (United States) Nicole Frenkel
July 27	Gatineau, Canada; Hard $25,000; Singles and doubles draws	(United States) Alexa Glatch; 6–4, 6–3	(Canada) Bianca Andreescu	(Canada) Carol Zhao (Mexico) Victoria Rodríguez	(Canada) Françoise Abanda (United States) Lauren Albanese (Japan) Shuko Aoyama (Mexico) Marcela Zacarías
July 27	Gatineau, Canada; Hard $25,000; Singles and doubles draws	(Australia) Jessica Moore (Canada) Carol Zhao; 6–3, 6–4	(Mexico) Victoria Rodríguez (Mexico) Marcela Zacarías	(Canada) Carol Zhao (Mexico) Victoria Rodríguez	(Canada) Françoise Abanda (United States) Lauren Albanese (Japan) Shuko Aoyama (Mexico) Marcela Zacarías
July 27	Rome, Italy; Clay $25,000; Singles and doubles draws	(Italy) Martina Trevisan; 6–1, 6–3	(Switzerland) Lisa Sabino	(Croatia) Jana Fett (Italy) Martina Caregaro	(Italy) Francesca Fusinato (Switzerland) Conny Perrin (Russia) Anastasiya Komardina (Romania) Raluca Șerban
July 27	Rome, Italy; Clay $25,000; Singles and doubles draws	(Italy) Claudia Giovine (Greece) Despina Papamichail; 6–4, 7–6^{(7–2)}	(United Kingdom) Tara Moore (Switzerland) Conny Perrin	(Croatia) Jana Fett (Italy) Martina Caregaro	(Italy) Francesca Fusinato (Switzerland) Conny Perrin (Russia) Anastasiya Komardina (Romania) Raluca Șerban
July 27	President's Cup; Astana, Kazakhstan; Hard $25,000; Singles and doubles draws	(Russia) Natela Dzalamidze; 6–6, ret.	(Russia) Ksenia Pervak	(Uzbekistan) Vlada Ekshibarova (Russia) Alena Tarasova	(Belarus) Sviatlana Pirazhenka (Kyrgyzstan) Ksenia Palkina (Georgia (country)) Mariam Bolkvadze (Russia) Ekaterina Yashina
July 27	President's Cup; Astana, Kazakhstan; Hard $25,000; Singles and doubles draws	(Russia) Natela Dzalamidze (Russia) Alena Tarasova; 6–0, 6–1	(Turkey) Başak Eraydın (Kyrgyzstan) Ksenia Palkina	(Uzbekistan) Vlada Ekshibarova (Russia) Alena Tarasova	(Belarus) Sviatlana Pirazhenka (Kyrgyzstan) Ksenia Palkina (Georgia (country)) Mariam Bolkvadze (Russia) Ekaterina Yashina
July 27	Horb am Neckar, Germany; Clay $15,000; Singles and doubles draws	(Czech Republic) Jesika Malečková; 1–6, 6–4, 6–2	(France) Sherazad Reix	(Austria) Pia König (Czech Republic) Marie Bouzková	(Russia) Anastasia Pribylova (Romania) Cristina Ene (Belgium) Kimberley Zimmermann (Germany) Carolin Daniels
July 27	Horb am Neckar, Germany; Clay $15,000; Singles and doubles draws	(Germany) Carolin Daniels (Belarus) Lidziya Marozava; 7–6^{(7–3)}, 4–6, [10–7]	(Argentina) Catalina Pella (Argentina) Guadalupe Pérez Rojas	(Austria) Pia König (Czech Republic) Marie Bouzková	(Russia) Anastasia Pribylova (Romania) Cristina Ene (Belgium) Kimberley Zimmermann (Germany) Carolin Daniels
July 27	Hong Kong; Hard $15,000; Singles and doubles draws	(South Korea) Lee So-ra; 6–4, 4–6, 6–2	(China) Xu Shilin	(South Korea) Choi Ji-hee (Indonesia) Beatrice Gumulya	(United States) Yuki Chiang (Thailand) Noppawan Lertcheewakarn (Japan) Yurina Koshino (United Kingdom) Harriet Dart
July 27	Hong Kong; Hard $15,000; Singles and doubles draws	(South Korea) Choi Ji-hee (South Korea) Lee So-ra; 6–1, 6–1	(China) Gai Ao (China) Sheng Yuqi	(South Korea) Choi Ji-hee (Indonesia) Beatrice Gumulya	(United States) Yuki Chiang (Thailand) Noppawan Lertcheewakarn (Japan) Yurina Koshino (United Kingdom) Harriet Dart
July 27	Buenos Aires, Argentina; Clay $10,000; Singles and doubles draws	(Chile) Daniela Seguel; 6–2, 6–2	(Mexico) Ana Sofía Sánchez	(Chile) Fernanda Brito (Brazil) Eduarda Piai	(Argentina) Constanza Vega (Brazil) Nathaly Kurata (Argentina) Carla Lucero (Brazil) Nathália Rossi
July 27	Buenos Aires, Argentina; Clay $10,000; Singles and doubles draws	(Chile) Fernanda Brito (Chile) Daniela Seguel; 6–2, 6–2	(Brazil) Nathaly Kurata (Brazil) Eduarda Piai	(Chile) Fernanda Brito (Brazil) Eduarda Piai	(Argentina) Constanza Vega (Brazil) Nathaly Kurata (Argentina) Carla Lucero (Brazil) Nathália Rossi
July 27	Sharm el-Sheikh, Egypt; Hard $10,000; Singles and doubles draws	(France) Victoria Muntean; 6–3, 3–6, 6–2	(Italy) Giada Clerici	(Ukraine) Valeriya Strakhova (Egypt) Sandra Samir	(Ukraine) Kateryna Sliusar (Russia) Elina Nepliy (Russia) Kseniia Bekker (Russia) Margarita Lazareva
July 27	Sharm el-Sheikh, Egypt; Hard $10,000; Singles and doubles draws	(Russia) Margarita Lazareva (Ukraine) Valeriya Strakhova; 6–4, 6–1	(Russia) Kseniia Bekker (Russia) Elina Nepliy	(Ukraine) Valeriya Strakhova (Egypt) Sandra Samir	(Ukraine) Kateryna Sliusar (Russia) Elina Nepliy (Russia) Kseniia Bekker (Russia) Margarita Lazareva
July 27	Pärnu, Estonia; Clay $10,000; Singles and doubles draws	(Lithuania) Joana Eidukonytė; 6–2, 6–3	(Netherlands) Eva Wacanno	(Belgium) India Maggen (Latvia) Laura Gulbe	(Norway) Emma Flood (Russia) Yana Sizikova (Belarus) Sadafmoh Tolibova (France) Laëtitia Sarrazin
July 27	Pärnu, Estonia; Clay $10,000; Singles and doubles draws	(Norway) Emma Flood (Netherlands) Eva Wacanno; 6–4, 6–2	(Lithuania) Joana Eidukonytė (United Kingdom) Helen Parish	(Belgium) India Maggen (Latvia) Laura Gulbe	(Norway) Emma Flood (Russia) Yana Sizikova (Belarus) Sadafmoh Tolibova (France) Laëtitia Sarrazin
July 27	Savitaipale, Finland; Clay $10,000; Singles and doubles draws	(Russia) Daria Mishina; 6–4, 4–6, 6–4	(Bosnia and Herzegovina) Dea Herdželaš	(Russia) Daria Kruzhkova (Finland) Piia Suomalainen	(Russia) Natalia Belova (Germany) Nora Niedmers (Belgium) Hélène Scholsen (Hungary) Lilla Barzó
July 27	Savitaipale, Finland; Clay $10,000; Singles and doubles draws	(Bosnia and Herzegovina) Dea Herdželaš (Netherlands) Rosalie van der Hoek; 7–6^{(7–3)}, 7–5	(Germany) Nora Niedmers (Belgium) Hélène Scholsen	(Russia) Daria Kruzhkova (Finland) Piia Suomalainen	(Russia) Natalia Belova (Germany) Nora Niedmers (Belgium) Hélène Scholsen (Hungary) Lilla Barzó
July 27	Târgu Jiu, Romania; Clay $10,000; Singles and doubles draws	(Serbia) Milana Spremo; 6–3, 7–5	(France) Marine Partaud	(Italy) Federica Arcidiacono (Hungary) Szabina Szlavikovics	(Romania) Nicoleta Dascălu (Serbia) Teodora Radosavljević (Romania) Andreea Roșca (France) Caroline Roméo
July 27	Târgu Jiu, Romania; Clay $10,000; Singles and doubles draws	(Romania) Raluca Ciufrila (Romania) Ioana Loredana Roșca; 6–4, 6–7^{(4–7)}, [10–5]	(Romania) Ana Bianca Mihăilă (Italy) Giulia Pairone	(Italy) Federica Arcidiacono (Hungary) Szabina Szlavikovics	(Romania) Nicoleta Dascălu (Serbia) Teodora Radosavljević (Romania) Andreea Roșca (France) Caroline Roméo
July 27	Valladolid, Spain; Hard $10,000; Singles and doubles draws	(Spain) María José Luque Moreno; 6–2, 6–2	(France) Tessah Andrianjafitrimo	(Spain) María Martínez Martínez (United Kingdom) Laura Deigman	(Spain) Ariadna Martí Riembau (Spain) Ana Román Domínguez (France) Joséphine Boualem (Spain) María Cañero Pérez
July 27	Valladolid, Spain; Hard $10,000; Singles and doubles draws	(Spain) María Cañero Pérez (Spain) Paula del Cueto Castillo; 2–6, 7–5, [11–9]	(Spain) María Martínez Martínez (Switzerland) Sara Ottomano	(Spain) María Martínez Martínez (United Kingdom) Laura Deigman	(Spain) Ariadna Martí Riembau (Spain) Ana Román Domínguez (France) Joséphine Boualem (Spain) María Cañero Pérez
July 27	Tunis, Tunisia; Clay $10,000; Singles and doubles draws	(Bosnia and Herzegovina) Jelena Simić; 1–6, 6–3, 6–4	(Russia) Maria Marfutina	(Argentina) Sofía Luini (Slovakia) Lenka Wienerová	(United States) Karyn Guttormsen (Switzerland) Samira Giger (Australia) Nives Baric (Romania) Cristina Moroi
July 27	Tunis, Tunisia; Clay $10,000; Singles and doubles draws	(Argentina) Sofía Luini (Bosnia and Herzegovina) Jelena Simić; 7–6^{(7–5)}, 3–6, [10–8]	(Germany) Alina Wessel (Slovakia) Lenka Wienerová	(Argentina) Sofía Luini (Slovakia) Lenka Wienerová	(United States) Karyn Guttormsen (Switzerland) Samira Giger (Australia) Nives Baric (Romania) Cristina Moroi
July 27	Istanbul, Turkey; Hard $10,000; Singles and doubles draws	(Turkey) Melis Sezer; 7–5, 7–6^{(7–4)}	(Turkey) Ayla Aksu	(United Kingdom) Mirabelle Njoze (Bulgaria) Julia Stamatova	(Italy) Valeria Prosperi (Turkey) Hülya Esen (Bolivia) María Fernanda Álvarez Terán (Australia) Sara Tomic
July 27	Istanbul, Turkey; Hard $10,000; Singles and doubles draws	(Sweden) Anette Munozova (Bulgaria) Julia Stamatova; 6–4, 6–3	(Netherlands) Nikki Luttikhuis (New Zealand) Claudia Williams	(United Kingdom) Mirabelle Njoze (Bulgaria) Julia Stamatova	(Italy) Valeria Prosperi (Turkey) Hülya Esen (Bolivia) María Fernanda Álvarez Terán (Australia) Sara Tomic
July 27	Austin, United States; Hard $10,000; Singles and doubles draws	(United States) Francesca Di Lorenzo; 4–6, 7–6^{(7–2)}, 6–2	(United States) Lauren Herring	(Hungary) Naomi Totka (United States) Alexa Graham	(United States) Ashley Kratzer (United States) Ashley Weinhold (United States) Morgan Coppoc (Samoa) Steffi Carruthers
July 27	Austin, United States; Hard $10,000; Singles and doubles draws	(United States) Sarah Dvorak (South Africa) Lynn Kiro; 6–3, 6–2	(United States) Chloe Ouellet-Pizer (United States) Gabrielle Smith	(Hungary) Naomi Totka (United States) Alexa Graham	(United States) Ashley Kratzer (United States) Ashley Weinhold (United States) Morgan Coppoc (Samoa) Steffi Carruthers

=== August ===
Week of	Tournament	Winner	Runners-up	Semifinalists	Quarterfinalists
August 3	Koksijde, Belgium; Clay $25,000; Singles and doubles draws	(Netherlands) Kiki Bertens; 3–6, 6–2, 6–3	(France) Myrtille Georges	(Netherlands) Arantxa Rus (Germany) Tamara Korpatsch	(France) Sherazad Reix (Belgium) Elyne Boeykens (Netherlands) Kelly Versteeg (Belgium) Elise Mertens
August 3	Koksijde, Belgium; Clay $25,000; Singles and doubles draws	(Belgium) Elise Mertens (Netherlands) Demi Schuurs; 6–3, 6–2	(Poland) Justyna Jegiołka (France) Sherazad Reix	(Netherlands) Arantxa Rus (Germany) Tamara Korpatsch	(France) Sherazad Reix (Belgium) Elyne Boeykens (Netherlands) Kelly Versteeg (Belgium) Elise Mertens
August 3	Plzeň, Czech Republic; Clay $25,000; Singles and doubles draws	(Czech Republic) Andrea Hlaváčková; 3–6, 6–2, 6–3	(Czech Republic) Barbora Krejčíková	(Russia) Anastasiya Komardina (Czech Republic) Gabriela Pantůčková	(Sweden) Rebecca Peterson (Croatia) Jana Fett (Italy) Anastasia Grymalska (Slovakia) Natália Vajdová
August 3	Plzeň, Czech Republic; Clay $25,000; Singles and doubles draws	(Czech Republic) Barbora Krejčíková (Sweden) Rebecca Peterson; 6–4, 6–3	(Czech Republic) Lenka Kunčíková (Czech Republic) Karolína Stuchlá	(Russia) Anastasiya Komardina (Czech Republic) Gabriela Pantůčková	(Sweden) Rebecca Peterson (Croatia) Jana Fett (Italy) Anastasia Grymalska (Slovakia) Natália Vajdová
August 3	Bad Saulgau, Germany; Clay $25,000; Singles and doubles draws	(Switzerland) Romina Oprandi; 6–3, 6–3	(Romania) Cristina Dinu	(Slovenia) Nastja Kolar (Greece) Maria Sakkari	(Germany) Laura Schaeder (Spain) Olga Sáez Larra (Austria) Barbara Haas (Ukraine) Sofiya Kovalets
August 3	Bad Saulgau, Germany; Clay $25,000; Singles and doubles draws	(Romania) Diana Buzean (Romania) Cristina Dinu; 2–6, 6–3, [10–8]	(Greece) Despina Papamichail (Greece) Maria Sakkari	(Slovenia) Nastja Kolar (Greece) Maria Sakkari	(Germany) Laura Schaeder (Spain) Olga Sáez Larra (Austria) Barbara Haas (Ukraine) Sofiya Kovalets
August 3	Moscow, Russia; Clay $25,000; Singles and doubles draws	(Russia) Viktoria Kamenskaya; 6–2, 6–2	(Turkey) Başak Eraydın	(Russia) Alena Tarasova (Russia) Natalia Vikhlyantseva	(Russia) Polina Vinogradova (Russia) Polina Leykina (Serbia) Doroteja Erić (Russia) Maria Marfutina
August 3	Moscow, Russia; Clay $25,000; Singles and doubles draws	(Russia) Natela Dzalamidze (Russia) Veronika Kudermetova; 6–3, 6–3	(Ukraine) Oleksandra Korashvili (Ukraine) Valeriya Strakhova	(Russia) Alena Tarasova (Russia) Natalia Vikhlyantseva	(Russia) Polina Vinogradova (Russia) Polina Leykina (Serbia) Doroteja Erić (Russia) Maria Marfutina
August 3	Buenos Aires, Argentina; Clay $10,000; Singles and doubles draws	(Chile) Daniela Seguel; 7–5, 6–1	(Chile) Fernanda Brito	(Brazil) Nathaly Kurata (Argentina) Carla Lucero	(Brazil) Giovanna Tomita (Argentina) Julieta Estable (Brazil) Eduarda Piai (Mexico) Ana Sofía Sánchez
August 3	Buenos Aires, Argentina; Clay $10,000; Singles and doubles draws	(Chile) Fernanda Brito (Chile) Daniela Seguel; 6–3, 6–2	(Brazil) Nathaly Kurata (Brazil) Eduarda Piai	(Brazil) Nathaly Kurata (Argentina) Carla Lucero	(Brazil) Giovanna Tomita (Argentina) Julieta Estable (Brazil) Eduarda Piai (Mexico) Ana Sofía Sánchez
August 3	Vienna, Austria; Clay $10,000; Singles and doubles draws	(Austria) Julia Grabher; 6–3, 3–6, 6–1	(Germany) Katharina Gerlach	(Austria) Karoline Kurz (Slovakia) Lenka Juríková	(Austria) Caroline Ilowska (Austria) Yvonne Neuwirth (Germany) Natalie Pröse (Austria) Marlies Szupper
August 3	Vienna, Austria; Clay $10,000; Singles and doubles draws	(Australia) Sally Peers (France) Laëtitia Sarrazin; 6–1, 6–2	(Hungary) Ágnes Bukta (Austria) Janina Toljan	(Austria) Karoline Kurz (Slovakia) Lenka Juríková	(Austria) Caroline Ilowska (Austria) Yvonne Neuwirth (Germany) Natalie Pröse (Austria) Marlies Szupper
August 3	Plovdiv, Bulgaria; Clay $10,000; Singles and doubles draws	(France) Margot Yerolymos; 6–2, 6–1	(Australia) Alexandra Nancarrow	(Australia) Angelique Svinos (Bulgaria) Julia Stamatova	(Ukraine) Nadiya Kolb (Bulgaria) Petia Arshinkova (Serbia) Tamara Čurović (Brazil) Flávia Guimarães Bueno
August 3	Plovdiv, Bulgaria; Clay $10,000; Singles and doubles draws	(Australia) Alexandra Nancarrow (Russia) Yana Sizikova; 6–3, 6–3	(Ukraine) Maryna Kolb (Ukraine) Nadiya Kolb	(Australia) Angelique Svinos (Bulgaria) Julia Stamatova	(Ukraine) Nadiya Kolb (Bulgaria) Petia Arshinkova (Serbia) Tamara Čurović (Brazil) Flávia Guimarães Bueno
August 3	Sharm el-Sheikh, Egypt; Hard $10,000; Singles and doubles draws	(Egypt) Sandra Samir; 6–1, 6–2	(France) Victoria Muntean	(Oman) Fatma Al-Nabhani (Republic of Ireland) Jenny Claffey	(Russia) Kseniia Bekker (Slovenia) Natalija Šipek (Spain) Irene Burillo Escorihuela (Czech Republic) Natálie Kallmünzerová
August 3	Sharm el-Sheikh, Egypt; Hard $10,000; Singles and doubles draws	(Russia) Kseniia Bekker (Russia) Elina Nepliy; 6–2, 7–5	(Sweden) Anette Munozova (France) Victoria Muntean	(Oman) Fatma Al-Nabhani (Republic of Ireland) Jenny Claffey	(Russia) Kseniia Bekker (Slovenia) Natalija Šipek (Spain) Irene Burillo Escorihuela (Czech Republic) Natálie Kallmünzerová
August 3	Tarvisio, Italy; Clay $10,000; Singles and doubles draws	(Slovenia) Pia Čuk; 6–4, 6–3	(Italy) Georgia Brescia	(Italy) Martina Di Giuseppe (Italy) Anna Remondina	(Italy) Alice Balducci (Italy) Deborah Chiesa (Slovenia) Tamara Zidanšek (Italy) Lucrezia Stefanini
August 3	Tarvisio, Italy; Clay $10,000; Singles and doubles draws	(Slovenia) Pia Čuk (Slovenia) Tamara Zidanšek; 6–1, 6–4	(Italy) Giorgia Marchetti (Italy) Maria Masini	(Italy) Martina Di Giuseppe (Italy) Anna Remondina	(Italy) Alice Balducci (Italy) Deborah Chiesa (Slovenia) Tamara Zidanšek (Italy) Lucrezia Stefanini
August 3	Târgu Jiu, Romania; Clay $10,000; Singles and doubles draws	(Italy) Martina Spigarelli; 2–6, 6–1, 6–4	(Romania) Irina Fetecău	(Romania) Nicoleta Dascălu (France) Caroline Roméo	(Serbia) Milana Spremo (Argentina) Ailen Crespo Azconzábal (Argentina) Ana Victoria Gobbi Monllau (Romania) Ioana Loredana Roșca
August 3	Târgu Jiu, Romania; Clay $10,000; Singles and doubles draws	(Italy) Federica Arcidiacono (Italy) Martina Spigarelli; 6–0, 7–6^{(8–6)}	(Argentina) Daniela Farfán (Italy) Giulia Pairone	(Romania) Nicoleta Dascălu (France) Caroline Roméo	(Serbia) Milana Spremo (Argentina) Ailen Crespo Azconzábal (Argentina) Ana Victoria Gobbi Monllau (Romania) Ioana Loredana Roșca
August 3	Open Castilla y León; El Espinar, Spain; Hard $10,000; Singles and doubles draws	(Spain) Rocío de la Torre Sánchez; 6–4, 3–6, 6–4	(France) Clothilde de Bernardi	(France) Joséphine Boualem (Bulgaria) Aleksandrina Naydenova	(Spain) Eva Martínez Regalado (Spain) Marina Bassols Ribera (United Kingdom) Laura Deigman (France) Alice Bacquié
August 3	Open Castilla y León; El Espinar, Spain; Hard $10,000; Singles and doubles draws	(Spain) Olga Parres Azcoitia (Italy) Camilla Rosatello; 6–1, 6–2	(Spain) Arabela Fernández Rabener (United Kingdom) Francesca Stephenson	(France) Joséphine Boualem (Bulgaria) Aleksandrina Naydenova	(Spain) Eva Martínez Regalado (Spain) Marina Bassols Ribera (United Kingdom) Laura Deigman (France) Alice Bacquié
August 3	Tunis, Tunisia; Clay $10,000; Singles and doubles draws	(Bosnia and Herzegovina) Jelena Simić; 6–2, 6–4	(Serbia) Barbara Bonić	(Russia) Margarita Lazareva (Australia) Nives Baric	(Ecuador) Charlotte Römer (Germany) Jasmin Jebawy (France) Amandine Cazeaux (Slovakia) Lenka Wienerová
August 3	Tunis, Tunisia; Clay $10,000; Singles and doubles draws	(Germany) Jasmin Jebawy (Ukraine) Olena Kyrpot; 6–3, 6–2	(France) Eléonore Barrère (France) Kassandra Davesne	(Russia) Margarita Lazareva (Australia) Nives Baric	(Ecuador) Charlotte Römer (Germany) Jasmin Jebawy (France) Amandine Cazeaux (Slovakia) Lenka Wienerová
August 3	Bursa, Turkey; Hard $10,000; Singles and doubles draws	(Germany) Julia Wachaczyk; 6–4, 6–4	(Turkey) Melis Sezer	(Israel) Saray Sterenbach (Turkey) Berfu Cengiz	(Slovakia) Zuzana Zlochová (United Kingdom) Mirabelle Njoze (Australia) Sara Tomic (Bolivia) María Fernanda Álvarez Terán
August 3	Bursa, Turkey; Hard $10,000; Singles and doubles draws	(Germany) Nora Niedmers (Germany) Julia Wachaczyk; 6–1, 6–1	(Germany) Katharina Hering (United Kingdom) Mirabelle Njoze	(Israel) Saray Sterenbach (Turkey) Berfu Cengiz	(Slovakia) Zuzana Zlochová (United Kingdom) Mirabelle Njoze (Australia) Sara Tomic (Bolivia) María Fernanda Álvarez Terán
August 3	Fort Worth, United States; Hard $10,000; Singles and doubles draws	(Norway) Ulrikke Eikeri; 6–3, 6–1	(United States) Frances Altick	(Brazil) Maria Fernanda Alves (Mexico) Giuliana Olmos	(France) Lou Brouleau (United States) Josie Kuhlman (Australia) Zoe Hives (United States) Marie Norris
August 3	Fort Worth, United States; Hard $10,000; Singles and doubles draws	(United States) Josie Kuhlman (United States) Maegan Manasse; 6–4, 6–4	(United States) Jessica Ho (Mexico) Giuliana Olmos	(Brazil) Maria Fernanda Alves (Mexico) Giuliana Olmos	(France) Lou Brouleau (United States) Josie Kuhlman (Australia) Zoe Hives (United States) Marie Norris
August 10	Advantage Cars Prague Open; Prague, Czech Republic; Clay $75,000; Singles – Doubles	(Spain) María Teresa Torró Flor; 6–3, 7–6^{(7–5)}	(Czech Republic) Denisa Allertová	(Ukraine) Maryna Zanevska (Czech Republic) Petra Cetkovská	(Belgium) Ysaline Bonaventure (Slovakia) Kristína Kučová (Czech Republic) Nicole Vaidišová (Spain) Sara Sorribes Tormo
August 10	Advantage Cars Prague Open; Prague, Czech Republic; Clay $75,000; Singles – Doubles	(Czech Republic) Kateřina Kramperová (United States) Bernarda Pera; 7–6^{(7–4)}, 5–7, [10–1]	(Czech Republic) Miriam Kolodziejová (Czech Republic) Markéta Vondroušová	(Ukraine) Maryna Zanevska (Czech Republic) Petra Cetkovská	(Belgium) Ysaline Bonaventure (Slovakia) Kristína Kučová (Czech Republic) Nicole Vaidišová (Spain) Sara Sorribes Tormo
August 10	Westende, Belgium; Hard $25,000; Singles and doubles draws	(Romania) Mihaela Buzărnescu; 6–1, 6–1	(France) Océane Dodin	(Netherlands) Lesley Kerkhove (Turkey) Başak Eraydın	(Ukraine) Alyona Sotnikova (Netherlands) Bibiane Weijers (Spain) Paula Badosa Gibert (Belgium) Elyne Boeykens
August 10	Westende, Belgium; Hard $25,000; Singles and doubles draws	(Netherlands) Lesley Kerkhove (Netherlands) Indy de Vroome; 7–6^{(7–4)}, 6–4	(India) Ankita Raina (Ukraine) Alyona Sotnikova	(Netherlands) Lesley Kerkhove (Turkey) Başak Eraydın	(Ukraine) Alyona Sotnikova (Netherlands) Bibiane Weijers (Spain) Paula Badosa Gibert (Belgium) Elyne Boeykens
August 10	Hechingen, Germany; Clay $25,000; Singles and doubles draws	(Switzerland) Romina Oprandi; 6–3, 1–6, 6–2	(Romania) Ana Bogdan	(Ukraine) Valeriya Strakhova (Italy) Alice Matteucci	(North Macedonia) Lina Gjorcheska (Netherlands) Quirine Lemoine (Germany) Antonia Lottner (Romania) Alexandra Cadanțu
August 10	Hechingen, Germany; Clay $25,000; Singles and doubles draws	(Venezuela) Andrea Gámiz (Ukraine) Anastasiya Vasylyeva; 4–6, 7–6^{(7–4)}, [10–3]	(Germany) Vivian Heisen (Philippines) Katharina Lehnert	(Ukraine) Valeriya Strakhova (Italy) Alice Matteucci	(North Macedonia) Lina Gjorcheska (Netherlands) Quirine Lemoine (Germany) Antonia Lottner (Romania) Alexandra Cadanțu
August 10	Landisville, United States; Hard $25,000; Singles and doubles draws	(United Kingdom) Naomi Broady; 4–6, 6–4, 7–6^{(7–5)}	(United States) Robin Anderson	(Belgium) An-Sophie Mestach (United States) Shelby Rogers	(Turkey) Çağla Büyükakçay (United States) Alexandra Mueller (United States) Victoria Duval (United States) Nicole Frenkel
August 10	Landisville, United States; Hard $25,000; Singles and doubles draws	(Serbia) Ivana Jorović (Australia) Jessica Moore; 6–1, 6–3	(United States) Brynn Boren (United States) Nadja Gilchrist	(Belgium) An-Sophie Mestach (United States) Shelby Rogers	(Turkey) Çağla Büyükakçay (United States) Alexandra Mueller (United States) Victoria Duval (United States) Nicole Frenkel
August 10	Innsbruck, Austria; Clay $10,000; Singles and doubles draws	(Italy) Jessica Pieri; 4–6, 6–1, 6–3	(Croatia) Iva Primorac	(Moldova) Anastasia Dețiuc (Italy) Bianca Turati	(Germany) Caroline Übelhör (Greece) Eleni Daniilidou (France) Laëtitia Sarrazin (Russia) Daria Lodikova
August 10	Innsbruck, Austria; Clay $10,000; Singles and doubles draws	(Bosnia and Herzegovina) Anita Husarić (Russia) Daria Lodikova; 6–4, 4–6, [10–7]	(Austria) Natasha Bredl (Austria) Nikola Hofmanova	(Moldova) Anastasia Dețiuc (Italy) Bianca Turati	(Germany) Caroline Übelhör (Greece) Eleni Daniilidou (France) Laëtitia Sarrazin (Russia) Daria Lodikova
August 10	Sharm el-Sheikh, Egypt; Hard $10,000; Singles and doubles draws	(Slovakia) Tereza Mihalíková; 6–2, 6–0	(Australia) Sara Tomic	(Oman) Fatma Al-Nabhani (Egypt) Sandra Samir	(Egypt) Lamis Alhussein Abdel Aziz (Italy) Anna Procacci (Italy) Martina Zerulo (Italy) Giorgia Pinto
August 10	Sharm el-Sheikh, Egypt; Hard $10,000; Singles and doubles draws	(Republic of Ireland) Jenny Claffey (Australia) Sara Tomic; 6–4, 6–0	(Oman) Fatma Al-Nabhani (Sweden) Anette Munozova	(Oman) Fatma Al-Nabhani (Egypt) Sandra Samir	(Egypt) Lamis Alhussein Abdel Aziz (Italy) Anna Procacci (Italy) Martina Zerulo (Italy) Giorgia Pinto
August 10	Arad, Romania; Clay $10,000; Singles and doubles draws	(Slovenia) Tamara Zidanšek; 6–1, 6–3	(Slovakia) Chantal Škamlová	(Serbia) Marina Kačar (Italy) Martina Spigarelli	(Slovenia) Pia Čuk (Hungary) Luca Nagymihály (Romania) Cristina Adamescu (Slovakia) Martina Okáľová
August 10	Arad, Romania; Clay $10,000; Singles and doubles draws	(Romania) Jaqueline Cristian (Romania) Elena Ruse; 6–3, 6–4	(Romania) Andreea Ghițescu (Slovakia) Katarína Strešnáková	(Serbia) Marina Kačar (Italy) Martina Spigarelli	(Slovenia) Pia Čuk (Hungary) Luca Nagymihály (Romania) Cristina Adamescu (Slovakia) Martina Okáľová
August 10	Tatarstan Open; Kazan, Russia; Clay $10,000; Singles and doubles draws	(Russia) Viktoria Kamenskaya; 6–1, 6–3	(Russia) Alena Tarasova	(Russia) Polina Leykina (Russia) Amina Anshba	(Russia) Anastasia Frolova (Russia) Daria Mishina (Ukraine) Oleksandra Korashvili (Russia) Ksenia Gaydarzhi
August 10	Tatarstan Open; Kazan, Russia; Clay $10,000; Singles and doubles draws	(Ukraine) Oleksandra Korashvili (Russia) Polina Leykina; Walkover	(Russia) Anastasia Frolova (Uzbekistan) Polina Merenkova	(Russia) Polina Leykina (Russia) Amina Anshba	(Russia) Anastasia Frolova (Russia) Daria Mishina (Ukraine) Oleksandra Korashvili (Russia) Ksenia Gaydarzhi
August 10	Gimcheon, South Korea; Hard $10,000; Singles and doubles draws	(South Korea) Lee So-ra; 6–2, 6–3	(Japan) Makoto Ninomiya	(South Korea) Choi Ji-hee (South Korea) Lee Se-jin	(South Korea) Park Sang-hee (South Korea) Han Sung-hee (China) Xun Fangying (Japan) Chiaki Okadaue
August 10	Gimcheon, South Korea; Hard $10,000; Singles and doubles draws	(China) Cao Siqi (China) Xun Fangying; 7–6^{(7–2)}, 6–4	(South Korea) Han Sung-hee (Japan) Makoto Ninomiya	(South Korea) Choi Ji-hee (South Korea) Lee Se-jin	(South Korea) Park Sang-hee (South Korea) Han Sung-hee (China) Xun Fangying (Japan) Chiaki Okadaue
August 10	Las Palmas, Spain; Clay $10,000; Singles and doubles draws	(Belarus) Anastasiya Yakimova; 6–1, 6–7^{(3–7)}, 6–2	(Spain) Irene Burillo Escorihuela	(Italy) Federica Arcidiacono (Ukraine) Anastasiya Shoshyna	(Australia) Alexandra Nancarrow (Czech Republic) Kristýna Hrabalová (Spain) Arabela Fernández Rabener (Poland) Olga Brózda
August 10	Las Palmas, Spain; Clay $10,000; Singles and doubles draws	(Poland) Olga Brózda (Ukraine) Anastasiya Shoshyna; 7–6^{(10–8)}, 3–6, [10–7]	(Netherlands) Chayenne Ewijk (Netherlands) Rosalie van der Hoek	(Italy) Federica Arcidiacono (Ukraine) Anastasiya Shoshyna	(Australia) Alexandra Nancarrow (Czech Republic) Kristýna Hrabalová (Spain) Arabela Fernández Rabener (Poland) Olga Brózda
August 10	Tunis, Tunisia; Clay $10,000; Singles and doubles draws	(Bosnia and Herzegovina) Dea Herdželaš; 3–6, 7–6^{(8–6)}, 6–3	(Bosnia and Herzegovina) Jelena Simić	(Russia) Anna Morgina (Russia) Margarita Lazareva	(France) Kassandra Davesne (United States) Karyn Guttormsen (Russia) Yana Sizikova (Germany) Jasmin Jebawy
August 10	Tunis, Tunisia; Clay $10,000; Singles and doubles draws	(France) Eléonore Barrère (France) Kassandra Davesne; 6–1, 6–3	(Serbia) Barbara Bonić (Russia) Yana Sizikova	(Russia) Anna Morgina (Russia) Margarita Lazareva	(France) Kassandra Davesne (United States) Karyn Guttormsen (Russia) Yana Sizikova (Germany) Jasmin Jebawy
August 10	Bursa, Turkey; Hard $10,000; Singles and doubles draws	(Turkey) Ayla Aksu; 6–3, 6–1	(Bolivia) María Fernanda Álvarez Terán	(Croatia) Ena Kajević (United Kingdom) Mirabelle Njoze	(Russia) Vasilisa Aponasenko (Uzbekistan) Arina Folts (Bolivia) Noelia Zeballos (Germany) Katharina Hering
August 10	Bursa, Turkey; Hard $10,000; Singles and doubles draws	(Germany) Katharina Hering (United Kingdom) Mirabelle Njoze; 7–6^{(7–4)}, 6–4	(Bolivia) María Fernanda Álvarez Terán (Bolivia) Noelia Zeballos	(Croatia) Ena Kajević (United Kingdom) Mirabelle Njoze	(Russia) Vasilisa Aponasenko (Uzbekistan) Arina Folts (Bolivia) Noelia Zeballos (Germany) Katharina Hering
August 10	Chiswick, United Kingdom; Hard $10,000; Singles and doubles draws	(United Kingdom) Katy Dunne; 6–3, 6–3	(United Kingdom) Emily Arbuthnott	(United Kingdom) Georgina Axon (United Kingdom) Harriet Dart	(United Kingdom) Freya Christie (United Kingdom) Helen Parish (United Kingdom) Francesca Stephenson (United Kingdom) Jodie Burrage
August 10	Chiswick, United Kingdom; Hard $10,000; Singles and doubles draws	(United Kingdom) Harriet Dart (United Kingdom) Katy Dunne; 6–2, 6–2	(United Kingdom) Emily Arbuthnott (United Kingdom) Freya Christie	(United Kingdom) Georgina Axon (United Kingdom) Harriet Dart	(United Kingdom) Freya Christie (United Kingdom) Helen Parish (United Kingdom) Francesca Stephenson (United Kingdom) Jodie Burrage
August 17	Odlum Brown Vancouver Open; Vancouver, Canada; Hard $100,000; Singles – Doubles	(United Kingdom) Johanna Konta; 6–2, 6–4	(Belgium) Kirsten Flipkens	(Russia) Alla Kudryavtseva (Belgium) Yanina Wickmayer	(Netherlands) Kiki Bertens (Estonia) Anett Kontaveit (Japan) Nao Hibino (Croatia) Petra Martić
August 17	Odlum Brown Vancouver Open; Vancouver, Canada; Hard $100,000; Singles – Doubles	(United Kingdom) Johanna Konta (United States) Maria Sanchez; 7–6^{(7–5)}, 6–4	(Romania) Raluca Olaru (United States) Anna Tatishvili	(Russia) Alla Kudryavtseva (Belgium) Yanina Wickmayer	(Netherlands) Kiki Bertens (Estonia) Anett Kontaveit (Japan) Nao Hibino (Croatia) Petra Martić
August 17	Saint Petersburg, Russia; Clay $25,000; Singles and doubles draws	(Russia) Polina Leykina; 6–4, 6–3	(Russia) Natalia Vikhlyantseva	(Russia) Polina Vinogradova (Ukraine) Olga Ianchuk	(Russia) Maria Marfutina (Turkey) Pemra Özgen (Russia) Anastasia Pribylova (Russia) Valentyna Ivakhnenko
August 17	Saint Petersburg, Russia; Clay $25,000; Singles and doubles draws	(Germany) Carolin Daniels (Belarus) Lidziya Marozava; 6–4, 4–6, [10–6]	(Russia) Natela Dzalamidze (Russia) Veronika Kudermetova	(Russia) Polina Vinogradova (Ukraine) Olga Ianchuk	(Russia) Maria Marfutina (Turkey) Pemra Özgen (Russia) Anastasia Pribylova (Russia) Valentyna Ivakhnenko
August 17	Wanfercée-Baulet, Belgium; Clay $15,000; Singles and doubles draws	(Belgium) Elyne Boeykens; 6–4, 6–2	(France) Chloé Paquet	(Germany) Tamara Korpatsch (Italy) Gioia Barbieri	(Netherlands) Eva Wacanno (Netherlands) Quirine Lemoine (Belgium) Sofie Oyen (Latvia) Diāna Marcinkēviča
August 17	Wanfercée-Baulet, Belgium; Clay $15,000; Singles and doubles draws	(Netherlands) Quirine Lemoine (Netherlands) Eva Wacanno; 2–6, 6–2, [10–6]	(Belgium) Elyne Boeykens (Bulgaria) Aleksandrina Naydenova	(Germany) Tamara Korpatsch (Italy) Gioia Barbieri	(Netherlands) Eva Wacanno (Netherlands) Quirine Lemoine (Belgium) Sofie Oyen (Latvia) Diāna Marcinkēviča
August 17	Leipzig, Germany; Clay $15,000; Singles and doubles draws	(Ukraine) Valeriya Strakhova; 7–6^{(9–7)}, 6–1	(Czech Republic) Jesika Malečková	(Austria) Pia König (Slovakia) Petra Uberalová	(Slovakia) Rebecca Šramková (Russia) Ekaterina Alexandrova (Germany) Anna Zaja (Italy) Alice Matteucci
August 17	Leipzig, Germany; Clay $15,000; Singles and doubles draws	(Australia) Priscilla Hon (Switzerland) Jil Teichmann; 6–1, 6–4	(Austria) Pia König (Switzerland) Conny Perrin	(Austria) Pia König (Slovakia) Petra Uberalová	(Slovakia) Rebecca Šramková (Russia) Ekaterina Alexandrova (Germany) Anna Zaja (Italy) Alice Matteucci
August 17	Graz, Austria; Clay $10,000; Singles and doubles draws	(Austria) Barbara Haas; 1–6, 6–1, 6–2	(Austria) Julia Grabher	(Slovenia) Eva Zagorac (Slovenia) Pia Čuk	(Slovakia) Lenka Juríková (France) Jade Suvrijn (Croatia) Iva Primorac (Slovenia) Nina Potočnik
August 17	Graz, Austria; Clay $10,000; Singles and doubles draws	(Austria) Lisa Hofbauer (Slovenia) Polona Reberšak; 7–5, 6–0	(Slovenia) Pia Brglez (Austria) Katharina Knöbl	(Slovenia) Eva Zagorac (Slovenia) Pia Čuk	(Slovakia) Lenka Juríková (France) Jade Suvrijn (Croatia) Iva Primorac (Slovenia) Nina Potočnik
August 17	Vinkovci, Croatia; Clay $10,000; Singles and doubles draws	(Slovakia) Chantal Škamlová; 4–6, 6–3, 7–5	(Serbia) Dejana Radanović	(Hungary) Anna Bondár (Serbia) Milana Spremo	(Czech Republic) Gabriela Pantůčková (Hungary) Lilla Barzó (Slovakia) Vivien Juhászová (Slovakia) Katarína Strešnáková
August 17	Vinkovci, Croatia; Clay $10,000; Singles and doubles draws	(Croatia) Ena Babić (Poland) Patrycja Polańska; 6–2, 3–6, [11–9]	(Czech Republic) Nina Holanová (Slovakia) Katarína Strešnáková	(Hungary) Anna Bondár (Serbia) Milana Spremo	(Czech Republic) Gabriela Pantůčková (Hungary) Lilla Barzó (Slovakia) Vivien Juhászová (Slovakia) Katarína Strešnáková
August 17	Sharm el-Sheikh, Egypt; Hard $10,000; Singles and doubles draws	(Italy) Anastasia Grymalska; 3–6, 7–6^{(9–7)}, 6–4	(Australia) Sara Tomic	(India) Rishika Sunkara (Ukraine) Katarina Zavatska	(India) Sri Peddi Reddy (India) Sowjanya Bavisetti (Switzerland) Sara Ottomano (Italy) Camilla Rosatello
August 17	Sharm el-Sheikh, Egypt; Hard $10,000; Singles and doubles draws	(India) Sowjanya Bavisetti (India) Rishika Sunkara; 6–1, 6–1	(United States) Eva Siskova (United States) Shelby Talcott	(India) Rishika Sunkara (Ukraine) Katarina Zavatska	(India) Sri Peddi Reddy (India) Sowjanya Bavisetti (Switzerland) Sara Ottomano (Italy) Camilla Rosatello
August 17	Oldenzaal, Netherlands; Clay $10,000; Singles and doubles draws	(Greece) Valentini Grammatikopoulou; 7–6^{(7–2)}, 6–3	(Philippines) Katharina Lehnert	(Netherlands) Kelly Versteeg (Paraguay) Camila Giangreco Campiz	(Switzerland) Patty Schnyder (Netherlands) Mandy Wagemaker (Belarus) Sviatlana Pirazhenka (Netherlands) Janneke Wikkerink
August 17	Oldenzaal, Netherlands; Clay $10,000; Singles and doubles draws	(Belgium) Steffi Distelmans (Netherlands) Kelly Versteeg; 6–3, 7–5	(Greece) Valentini Grammatikopoulou (Belarus) Sviatlana Pirazhenka	(Netherlands) Kelly Versteeg (Paraguay) Camila Giangreco Campiz	(Switzerland) Patty Schnyder (Netherlands) Mandy Wagemaker (Belarus) Sviatlana Pirazhenka (Netherlands) Janneke Wikkerink
August 17	Bucharest, Romania; Clay $10,000; Singles and doubles draws	(Romania) Diana Buzean; 6–3, 4–6, 6–1	(Romania) Cristina Ene	(Romania) Elena Ruse (Bulgaria) Viktoriya Tomova	(Serbia) Marina Kačar (Romania) Irina Fetecău (Ukraine) Anastasiya Fedoryshyn (Romania) Simona Ionescu
August 17	Bucharest, Romania; Clay $10,000; Singles and doubles draws	(Romania) Diana Buzean (Romania) Cristina Dinu; 6–0, 6–2	(Romania) Elena Ruse (Romania) Oana Georgeta Simion	(Romania) Elena Ruse (Bulgaria) Viktoriya Tomova	(Serbia) Marina Kačar (Romania) Irina Fetecău (Ukraine) Anastasiya Fedoryshyn (Romania) Simona Ionescu
August 17	Gimcheon, South Korea; Hard $10,000; Singles and doubles draws	(South Korea) Kim Na-ri; 6–0, 6–4	(Japan) Kyōka Okamura	(Japan) Makoto Ninomiya (South Korea) Choi Ji-hee	(Chinese Taipei) Lee Yang (China) Wang Yan (South Korea) Han Sung-hee (Japan) Chiaki Okadaue
August 17	Gimcheon, South Korea; Hard $10,000; Singles and doubles draws	(South Korea) Choi Ji-hee (South Korea) Kim Na-ri; 6–3, 6–2	(South Korea) Jung So-hee (South Korea) Park Sang-hee	(Japan) Makoto Ninomiya (South Korea) Choi Ji-hee	(Chinese Taipei) Lee Yang (China) Wang Yan (South Korea) Han Sung-hee (Japan) Chiaki Okadaue
August 17	Las Palmas, Spain; Clay $10,000; Singles and doubles draws	(Spain) Marta González Encinas; 6–4, 2–6, 7–6^{(7–3)}	(Ukraine) Anastasiya Shoshyna	(Spain) Rocío de la Torre Sánchez (Spain) Irene Burillo Escorihuela	(Belarus) Anastasiya Yakimova (Spain) Carlota Molina Megías (Czech Republic) Kristýna Hrabalová (Germany) Lisa Matviyenko
August 17	Las Palmas, Spain; Clay $10,000; Singles and doubles draws	(Netherlands) Chayenne Ewijk (Netherlands) Rosalie van der Hoek; 7–6^{(7–5)}, 6–0	(Spain) Marta González Encinas (Spain) Estela Pérez Somarriba	(Spain) Rocío de la Torre Sánchez (Spain) Irene Burillo Escorihuela	(Belarus) Anastasiya Yakimova (Spain) Carlota Molina Megías (Czech Republic) Kristýna Hrabalová (Germany) Lisa Matviyenko
August 17	Port El Kantaoui, Tunisia; Hard $10,000; Singles and doubles draws	(Russia) Margarita Lazareva; 3–6, 6–2, 6–2	(Russia) Yana Sizikova	(Bosnia and Herzegovina) Dea Herdželaš (Hungary) Naomi Totka	(Russia) Anna Morgina (Ecuador) Charlotte Römer (Serbia) Barbara Bonić (Portugal) Inês Murta
August 17	Port El Kantaoui, Tunisia; Hard $10,000; Singles and doubles draws	(Argentina) Sofía Luini (Hungary) Naomi Totka; 7–5, 1–6, [10–7]	(Belarus) Darya Chernetsova (Russia) Yana Sizikova	(Bosnia and Herzegovina) Dea Herdželaš (Hungary) Naomi Totka	(Russia) Anna Morgina (Ecuador) Charlotte Römer (Serbia) Barbara Bonić (Portugal) Inês Murta
August 17	İzmir, Turkey; Hard $10,000; Singles and doubles draws	(Turkey) Ayla Aksu; 2–6, 6–4, 7–6^{(7–4)}	(Israel) Keren Shlomo	(Russia) Vasilisa Aponasenko (Croatia) Ena Kajević	(Uzbekistan) Arina Folts (Australia) Alicia Smith (Germany) Nora Niedmers (Bulgaria) Julia Stamatova
August 17	İzmir, Turkey; Hard $10,000; Singles and doubles draws	(Germany) Nora Niedmers (Germany) Julia Wachaczyk; 7–6^{(7–4)}, 6–4	(Turkey) Ayla Aksu (Uzbekistan) Arina Folts	(Russia) Vasilisa Aponasenko (Croatia) Ena Kajević	(Uzbekistan) Arina Folts (Australia) Alicia Smith (Germany) Nora Niedmers (Bulgaria) Julia Stamatova
August 24	Winnipeg, Canada; Hard $25,000; Singles and doubles draws	(United States) Kristie Ahn; 6–2, 7–5	(Canada) Sharon Fichman	(Serbia) Jovana Jakšić (Netherlands) Michaëlla Krajicek	(Poland) Magdalena Fręch (Ukraine) Lyudmyla Kichenok (Canada) Aleksandra Wozniak (United Kingdom) Emily Webley-Smith
August 24	Winnipeg, Canada; Hard $25,000; Singles and doubles draws	(Canada) Sharon Fichman (Serbia) Jovana Jakšić; 6–2, 6–1	(United States) Kristie Ahn (United States) Lorraine Guillermo	(Serbia) Jovana Jakšić (Netherlands) Michaëlla Krajicek	(Poland) Magdalena Fręch (Ukraine) Lyudmyla Kichenok (Canada) Aleksandra Wozniak (United Kingdom) Emily Webley-Smith
August 24	Tsukuba, Japan; Hard $25,000; Singles and doubles draws	(Chinese Taipei) Lee Ya-hsuan; 6–3, 6–3	(South Korea) Jang Su-jeong	(Thailand) Peangtarn Plipuech (South Korea) Lee So-ra	(China) Sun Xuliu (Thailand) Noppawan Lertcheewakarn (Hong Kong) Zhang Ling (Japan) Kanae Hisami
August 24	Tsukuba, Japan; Hard $25,000; Singles and doubles draws	(Chinese Taipei) Lee Ya-hsuan (Japan) Makoto Ninomiya; 6–7^{(4–7)}, 7–6^{(7–2)}, [10–6]	(Thailand) Nicha Lertpitaksinchai (Thailand) Peangtarn Plipuech	(Thailand) Peangtarn Plipuech (South Korea) Lee So-ra	(China) Sun Xuliu (Thailand) Noppawan Lertcheewakarn (Hong Kong) Zhang Ling (Japan) Kanae Hisami
August 24	Mamaia, Romania; Clay $25,000; Singles and doubles draws	(Romania) Ana Bogdan; 6–7^{(5–7)}, 6–2, 6–3	(Romania) Cristina Dinu	(Romania) Nicoleta Dascălu (Russia) Maria Marfutina	(Romania) Alexandra Cadanțu (Georgia (country)) Sofia Shapatava (Switzerland) Amra Sadiković (Romania) Diana Buzean
August 24	Mamaia, Romania; Clay $25,000; Singles and doubles draws	(Russia) Anastasiya Komardina (Georgia (country)) Sofia Shapatava; 6–3, 5–7, [10–8]	(Switzerland) Xenia Knoll (Switzerland) Amra Sadiković	(Romania) Nicoleta Dascălu (Russia) Maria Marfutina	(Romania) Alexandra Cadanțu (Georgia (country)) Sofia Shapatava (Switzerland) Amra Sadiković (Romania) Diana Buzean
August 24	Aegon GB Pro-Series Foxhills; Woking, United Kingdom; Hard $25,000; Singles and doubles draws	(Switzerland) Viktorija Golubic; 6–4, 6–4	(United Kingdom) Katy Dunne	(Turkey) Pemra Özgen (Latvia) Diāna Marcinkēviča	(Croatia) Ana Vrljić (Slovakia) Rebecca Šramková (United Kingdom) Freya Christie (Italy) Claudia Giovine
August 24	Aegon GB Pro-Series Foxhills; Woking, United Kingdom; Hard $25,000; Singles and doubles draws	(Italy) Claudia Giovine (Greece) Despina Papamichail; 6–2, 6–1	(United Kingdom) Harriet Dart (United Kingdom) Katy Dunne	(Turkey) Pemra Özgen (Latvia) Diāna Marcinkēviča	(Croatia) Ana Vrljić (Slovakia) Rebecca Šramková (United Kingdom) Freya Christie (Italy) Claudia Giovine
August 24	Braunschweig, Germany; Clay $15,000; Singles and doubles draws	(Switzerland) Jil Teichmann; 6–3, 6–3	(Russia) Ekaterina Alexandrova	(Czech Republic) Martina Borecká (Philippines) Katharina Lehnert	(Poland) Katarzyna Kawa (Belgium) Marie Benoît (Denmark) Karen Barbat (Germany) Charlotte Klasen
August 24	Braunschweig, Germany; Clay $15,000; Singles and doubles draws	(Japan) Mana Ayukawa (Italy) Gaia Sanesi; 3–6, 7–6^{(7–5)}, [10–4]	(Germany) Shaline-Doreen Pipa (Germany) Anastazja Rosnowska	(Czech Republic) Martina Borecká (Philippines) Katharina Lehnert	(Poland) Katarzyna Kawa (Belgium) Marie Benoît (Denmark) Karen Barbat (Germany) Charlotte Klasen
August 24	Bagnatica, Italy; Clay $15,000; Singles and doubles draws	(Germany) Anne Schäfer; 2–6, 6–1, 6–2	(Slovenia) Tamara Zidanšek	(Italy) Anastasia Grymalska (France) Sherazad Reix	(Russia) Alena Tarasova (Austria) Melanie Klaffner (Italy) Jessica Pieri (Serbia) Doroteja Erić
August 24	Bagnatica, Italy; Clay $15,000; Singles and doubles draws	(Italy) Anastasia Grymalska (Belarus) Ilona Kremen; 6–4, 6–2	(Italy) Alice Balducci (France) Sherazad Reix	(Italy) Anastasia Grymalska (France) Sherazad Reix	(Russia) Alena Tarasova (Austria) Melanie Klaffner (Italy) Jessica Pieri (Serbia) Doroteja Erić
August 24	San Luis Potosí, Mexico; Hard $15,000; Singles and doubles draws	(Mexico) Victoria Rodríguez; 7–6^{(7–3)}, 2–6, 6–3	(Bolivia) María Fernanda Álvarez Terán	(United States) Julia Jones (United States) Lauren Herring	(Mexico) Constanza Gorches (Mexico) Nazari Urbina (Paraguay) Montserrat González (Chinese Taipei) Hsu Chieh-yu
August 24	San Luis Potosí, Mexico; Hard $15,000; Singles and doubles draws	(Paraguay) Montserrat González (Mexico) Ana Sofía Sánchez; 4–6, 6–3, [10–8]	(Brazil) Maria Fernanda Alves (Brazil) Laura Pigossi	(United States) Julia Jones (United States) Lauren Herring	(Mexico) Constanza Gorches (Mexico) Nazari Urbina (Paraguay) Montserrat González (Chinese Taipei) Hsu Chieh-yu
August 24	Pörtschach, Austria; Clay $10,000; Singles and doubles draws	(Austria) Julia Grabher; 7–6^{(7–5)}, 6–1	(Czech Republic) Marie Bouzková	(Czech Republic) Karolína Muchová (Slovenia) Pia Čuk	(Austria) Yvonne Neuwirth (Slovakia) Lenka Juríková (Slovakia) Natália Vajdová (Slovenia) Polona Reberšak
August 24	Pörtschach, Austria; Clay $10,000; Singles and doubles draws	(Austria) Mira Antonitsch (Austria) Julia Grabher; 6–2, 6–1	(Croatia) Iva Primorac (Austria) Janina Toljan	(Czech Republic) Karolína Muchová (Slovenia) Pia Čuk	(Austria) Yvonne Neuwirth (Slovakia) Lenka Juríková (Slovakia) Natália Vajdová (Slovenia) Polona Reberšak
August 24	Čakovec, Croatia; Clay $10,000; Singles and doubles draws	(United States) Nicole Coopersmith; 7–6^{(7–2)}, 3–6, 6–1	(Czech Republic) Gabriela Pantůčková	(Croatia) Adrijana Lekaj (Hungary) Ágnes Bukta	(Croatia) Tena Lukas (Serbia) Milana Spremo (Slovenia) Nina Potočnik (Australia) Karolina Wlodarczak
August 24	Čakovec, Croatia; Clay $10,000; Singles and doubles draws	(Hungary) Ágnes Bukta (Slovakia) Vivien Juhászová; 6–4, 6–2	(Czech Republic) Nina Holanová (Slovakia) Katarína Strešnáková	(Croatia) Adrijana Lekaj (Hungary) Ágnes Bukta	(Croatia) Tena Lukas (Serbia) Milana Spremo (Slovenia) Nina Potočnik (Australia) Karolina Wlodarczak
August 24	Sharm el-Sheikh, Egypt; Hard $10,000; Singles and doubles draws	(Ukraine) Katarina Zavatska; 2–6, 6–2, 6–3	(Egypt) Ola Abou Zekry	(Czech Republic) Martina Přádová (Switzerland) Sara Ottomano	(Belarus) Lizaveta Hancharova (Thailand) Kamonwan Buayam (France) Victoria Muntean (China) Lu Jiaxi
August 24	Sharm el-Sheikh, Egypt; Hard $10,000; Singles and doubles draws	(Thailand) Kamonwan Buayam (France) Victoria Muntean; 7–5, 6–4	(China) Wang Danni (China) Yu Yuanyi	(Czech Republic) Martina Přádová (Switzerland) Sara Ottomano	(Belarus) Lizaveta Hancharova (Thailand) Kamonwan Buayam (France) Victoria Muntean (China) Lu Jiaxi
August 24	Rotterdam, Netherlands; Clay $10,000; Singles and doubles draws	(Netherlands) Chayenne Ewijk; 7–6^{(7–3)}, 6–3	(Greece) Valentini Grammatikopoulou	(Belgium) Sofie Oyen (Belarus) Sviatlana Pirazhenka	(Belgium) Britt Geukens (Belgium) Elyne Boeykens (Netherlands) Suzan Lamens (Netherlands) Kelly Versteeg
August 24	Rotterdam, Netherlands; Clay $10,000; Singles and doubles draws	(Netherlands) Rosalie van der Hoek (Netherlands) Kelly Versteeg; 6–7^{(6–8)}, 6–1, [10–5]	(Germany) Katharina Hering (Switzerland) Karin Kennel	(Belgium) Sofie Oyen (Belarus) Sviatlana Pirazhenka	(Belgium) Britt Geukens (Belgium) Elyne Boeykens (Netherlands) Suzan Lamens (Netherlands) Kelly Versteeg
August 24	Koper, Slovenia; Clay $10,000; Singles and doubles draws	(Argentina) Julieta Estable; 3–6, 6–4, 6–2	(Serbia) Dejana Radanović	(Hungary) Anna Bondár (Hungary) Rebeka Stolmár	(Croatia) Silvia Njirić (Hungary) Lilla Barzó (Slovenia) Manca Pislak (Czech Republic) Kateřina Kramperová
August 24	Koper, Slovenia; Clay $10,000; Singles and doubles draws	(Argentina) Julieta Estable (Slovakia) Barbara Kötelesová; 3–6, 7–5, [10–7]	(Slovakia) Jana Jablonovská (Slovenia) Manca Pislak	(Hungary) Anna Bondár (Hungary) Rebeka Stolmár	(Croatia) Silvia Njirić (Hungary) Lilla Barzó (Slovenia) Manca Pislak (Czech Republic) Kateřina Kramperová
August 24	Gimcheon, South Korea; Hard $10,000; Singles and doubles draws	(South Korea) Han Sung-hee; 5–7, 7–5, 4–1, ret.	(Japan) Kanami Tsuji	(South Korea) Kim Dabin (South Korea) Kim Na-ri	(China) Wang Yan (China) You Xiaodi (China) Zhao Di (South Korea) Lee Ji-hee
August 24	Gimcheon, South Korea; Hard $10,000; Singles and doubles draws	(South Korea) Hong Seung-yeon (South Korea) Kim So-jung; 6–4, 6–7^{(1–7)}, [10–8]	(South Korea) Han Sung-hee (South Korea) Kim Na-ri	(South Korea) Kim Dabin (South Korea) Kim Na-ri	(China) Wang Yan (China) You Xiaodi (China) Zhao Di (South Korea) Lee Ji-hee
August 24	Caslano, Switzerland; Clay $10,000; Singles and doubles draws	(Italy) Georgia Brescia; 6–4, 6–1	(Netherlands) Eva Wacanno	(Germany) Natalie Pröse (Hungary) Vanda Lukács	(Switzerland) Ylena In-Albon (Germany) Vivian Wolff (Switzerland) Chiara Grimm (France) Carla Touly
August 24	Caslano, Switzerland; Clay $10,000; Singles and doubles draws	(France) Carla Touly (Netherlands) Eva Wacanno; 3–6, 6–3, [10–5]	(Switzerland) Chiara Grimm (Switzerland) Nina Stadler	(Germany) Natalie Pröse (Hungary) Vanda Lukács	(Switzerland) Ylena In-Albon (Germany) Vivian Wolff (Switzerland) Chiara Grimm (France) Carla Touly
August 24	Port El Kantaoui, Tunisia; Hard $10,000; Singles and doubles draws	(Oman) Fatma Al-Nabhani; 6–1, 6–4	(Russia) Ekaterina Kazionova	(France) Sarah Finck (Slovakia) Michaela Hončová	(Russia) Margarita Lazareva (France) Clémence Fayol (Spain) Mariona del Peral Francin (France) Fiona Codino
August 24	Port El Kantaoui, Tunisia; Hard $10,000; Singles and doubles draws	(Oman) Fatma Al-Nabhani (Slovakia) Michaela Hončová; 6–2, 7–5	(Russia) Margarita Lazareva (Argentina) Sofía Luini	(France) Sarah Finck (Slovakia) Michaela Hončová	(Russia) Margarita Lazareva (France) Clémence Fayol (Spain) Mariona del Peral Francin (France) Fiona Codino
August 24	Antalya, Turkey; Hard $10,000; Singles and doubles draws	(France) Lou Brouleau; 0–6, 7–5, 6–4	(Turkey) Melis Sezer	(Russia) Ksenia Gaydarzhi (Bulgaria) Julia Stamatova	(China) Li Yuenu (Israel) Keren Shlomo (Russia) Vasilisa Aponasenko (Belgium) Déborah Kerfs
August 24	Antalya, Turkey; Hard $10,000; Singles and doubles draws	(Ukraine) Alona Fomina (Germany) Alina Wessel; 6–3, 6–3	(Germany) Kim Grajdek (Israel) Keren Shlomo	(Russia) Ksenia Gaydarzhi (Bulgaria) Julia Stamatova	(China) Li Yuenu (Israel) Keren Shlomo (Russia) Vasilisa Aponasenko (Belgium) Déborah Kerfs
August 31	Noto, Japan; Carpet $25,000; Singles and doubles draws	(Chinese Taipei) Lee Ya-hsuan; 6–3, 3–6, 7–6^{(12–10)}	(Japan) Kyōka Okamura	(Chinese Taipei) Hsu Ching-wen (Japan) Yuuki Tanaka	(Japan) Aki Yamasoto (Japan) Mai Minokoshi (South Korea) Lee So-ra (Japan) Miyabi Inoue
August 31	Noto, Japan; Carpet $25,000; Singles and doubles draws	(South Korea) Jang Su-jeong (South Korea) Lee So-ra; 6–3, 2–6, [10–8]	(Japan) Chiaki Okadaue (Japan) Kyōka Okamura	(Chinese Taipei) Hsu Ching-wen (Japan) Yuuki Tanaka	(Japan) Aki Yamasoto (Japan) Mai Minokoshi (South Korea) Lee So-ra (Japan) Miyabi Inoue
August 31	Barcelona, Spain; Clay $15,000; Singles and doubles draws	(France) Myrtille Georges; 6–3, 7–6^{(7–2)}	(Spain) Georgina García Pérez	(Russia) Polina Vinogradova (India) Snehadevi Reddy	(Georgia (country)) Sofia Shapatava (Spain) Cristina Bucșa (Spain) Estrella Cabeza Candela (Australia) Seone Mendez
August 31	Barcelona, Spain; Clay $15,000; Singles and doubles draws	(Spain) Aliona Bolsova Zadoinov (Italy) Gaia Sanesi; 6–3, 6–4	(Spain) Estrella Cabeza Candela (Ukraine) Oleksandra Korashvili	(Russia) Polina Vinogradova (India) Snehadevi Reddy	(Georgia (country)) Sofia Shapatava (Spain) Cristina Bucșa (Spain) Estrella Cabeza Candela (Australia) Seone Mendez
August 31	Sankt Pölten, Austria; Clay $10,000; Singles and doubles draws	(Austria) Pia König; 6–0, 3–6, 7–5	(Czech Republic) Diana Šumová	(Poland) Justyna Jegiołka (Austria) Lisa-Maria Moser	(Slovakia) Rebecca Šramková (Austria) Julia Grabher (Austria) Janina Toljan (Austria) Natasha Bredl
August 31	Sankt Pölten, Austria; Clay $10,000; Singles and doubles draws	(Austria) Pia König (Slovakia) Rebecca Šramková; 6–2, 6–2	(Germany) Nora Niedmers (United States) Tina Tehrani	(Poland) Justyna Jegiołka (Austria) Lisa-Maria Moser	(Slovakia) Rebecca Šramková (Austria) Julia Grabher (Austria) Janina Toljan (Austria) Natasha Bredl
August 31	Engis, Belgium; Clay $10,000; Singles and doubles draws	(Philippines) Katharina Lehnert; 6–3, 2–6, 6–1	(Germany) Vivian Heisen	(Switzerland) Karin Kennel (Belgium) Sofie Oyen	(Netherlands) Nikki Luttikhuis (France) Margot Decker (Switzerland) Lara Michel (Netherlands) Bibiane Weijers
August 31	Engis, Belgium; Clay $10,000; Singles and doubles draws	(Switzerland) Karin Kennel (Switzerland) Lara Michel; 6–0, 6–4	(Belgium) Margaux Bovy (Belgium) Hélène Scholsen	(Switzerland) Karin Kennel (Belgium) Sofie Oyen	(Netherlands) Nikki Luttikhuis (France) Margot Decker (Switzerland) Lara Michel (Netherlands) Bibiane Weijers
August 31	Bol, Croatia; Clay $10,000; Singles and doubles draws	(Hungary) Anna Bondár; 6–4, 6–2	(Croatia) Tena Lukas	(Moldova) Anastasia Vdovenco (Czech Republic) Magdaléna Pantůčková	(Slovenia) Natalija Šipek (Croatia) Silvia Njirić (Croatia) Adrijana Lekaj (Hungary) Luca Nagymihály
August 31	Bol, Croatia; Clay $10,000; Singles and doubles draws	(Croatia) Adrijana Lekaj (Croatia) Silvia Njirić; 6–4, 7–5	(Hungary) Anna Bondár (Hungary) Rebeka Stolmár	(Moldova) Anastasia Vdovenco (Czech Republic) Magdaléna Pantůčková	(Slovenia) Natalija Šipek (Croatia) Silvia Njirić (Croatia) Adrijana Lekaj (Hungary) Luca Nagymihály
August 31	Prague, Czech Republic; Clay $10,000; Singles and doubles draws	(Switzerland) Patty Schnyder; 6–1, 6–2	(Slovakia) Zuzana Luknárová	(Czech Republic) Karolína Muchová (Czech Republic) Eva Rutarová	(Brazil) Laura Pigossi (Slovakia) Jana Jablonovská (Czech Republic) Anna Vrbenská (Russia) Ekaterina Alexandrova
August 31	Prague, Czech Republic; Clay $10,000; Singles and doubles draws	(Slovakia) Zuzana Luknárová (Brazil) Laura Pigossi; 6–3, 6–7^{(4–7)}, [10–6]	(Slovakia) Jana Jablonovská (Czech Republic) Vendula Žovincová	(Czech Republic) Karolína Muchová (Czech Republic) Eva Rutarová	(Brazil) Laura Pigossi (Slovakia) Jana Jablonovská (Czech Republic) Anna Vrbenská (Russia) Ekaterina Alexandrova
August 31	Sharm el-Sheikh, Egypt; Hard $10,000; Singles and doubles draws	(China) Yu Yuanyi; 6–3, 6–1	(Russia) Yana Sizikova	(Thailand) Kamonwan Buayam (France) Victoria Muntean	(Egypt) Ola Abou Zekry (India) Kanika Vaidya (China) Lu Jiaxi (Sweden) Brenda Njuki
August 31	Sharm el-Sheikh, Egypt; Hard $10,000; Singles and doubles draws	(Russia) Yulia Bryzgalova (India) Kanika Vaidya; 7–6^{(7–4)}, 6–4	(Finland) Ella Leivo (Finland) Roosa Timonen	(Thailand) Kamonwan Buayam (France) Victoria Muntean	(Egypt) Ola Abou Zekry (India) Kanika Vaidya (China) Lu Jiaxi (Sweden) Brenda Njuki
August 31	Kiryat Gat, Israel; Hard $10,000; Singles and doubles draws	(Israel) Deniz Khazaniuk; 6–3, 6–0	(Montenegro) Ana Veselinović	(Israel) Saray Sterenbach (Israel) May Kimhi	(Israel) Valeria Patiuk (Israel) Valeria Nikolaev (Israel) Talya Zandberg (United Kingdom) Francesca Stephenson
August 31	Kiryat Gat, Israel; Hard $10,000; Singles and doubles draws	(United Kingdom) Francesca Stephenson (Montenegro) Ana Veselinović; 6–3, 7–5	(Israel) May Kimhi (Israel) Maya Tahan	(Israel) Saray Sterenbach (Israel) May Kimhi	(Israel) Valeria Patiuk (Israel) Valeria Nikolaev (Israel) Talya Zandberg (United Kingdom) Francesca Stephenson
August 31	Duino-Aurisina, Italy; Clay $10,000; Singles and doubles draws	(Italy) Georgia Brescia; 3–6, 7–6^{(7–4)}, 6–1	(Hungary) Vanda Lukács	(Greece) Eleni Daniilidou (Slovenia) Pia Čuk	(Croatia) Iva Primorac (Italy) Camilla Scala (Slovenia) Eva Zagorac (Italy) Stefania Rubini
August 31	Duino-Aurisina, Italy; Clay $10,000; Singles and doubles draws	(Paraguay) Camila Giangreco Campiz (Netherlands) Erika Vogelsang; 6–2, 7–5	(Slovenia) Pia Brglez (Slovenia) Sara Palčič	(Greece) Eleni Daniilidou (Slovenia) Pia Čuk	(Croatia) Iva Primorac (Italy) Camilla Scala (Slovenia) Eva Zagorac (Italy) Stefania Rubini
August 31	Vrnjačka Banja, Serbia; Clay $10,000; Singles and doubles draws	(North Macedonia) Lina Gjorcheska; 6–7^{(4–7)}, 6–1, 6–0	(Slovenia) Nina Potočnik	(Czech Republic) Gabriela Horáčková (Argentina) Ana Victoria Gobbi Monllau	(Argentina) Julieta Estable (Serbia) Kristina Miletić (Slovakia) Chantal Škamlová (Russia) Anna Makhorkina
August 31	Vrnjačka Banja, Serbia; Clay $10,000; Singles and doubles draws	(North Macedonia) Lina Gjorcheska (Slovakia) Chantal Škamlová; 6–4, 6–0	(Serbia) Marina Lazić (Serbia) Bojana Marinković	(Czech Republic) Gabriela Horáčková (Argentina) Ana Victoria Gobbi Monllau	(Argentina) Julieta Estable (Serbia) Kristina Miletić (Slovakia) Chantal Škamlová (Russia) Anna Makhorkina
August 31	Yeongwol, South Korea; Hard $10,000; Singles and doubles draws	(China) You Xiaodi; 6–1, 6–3	(South Korea) Han Sung-hee	(South Korea) Hong Seung-yeon (China) Zhao Di	(South Korea) Jeong Yeong-won (South Korea) Ji Ha-young (Japan) Mizuno Kijima (South Korea) Lee Ji-hee
August 31	Yeongwol, South Korea; Hard $10,000; Singles and doubles draws	(South Korea) Han Sung-hee (South Korea) Hong Seung-yeon; 7–5, 3–6, [10–7]	(China) You Xiaodi (China) Zhang Yukun	(South Korea) Hong Seung-yeon (China) Zhao Di	(South Korea) Jeong Yeong-won (South Korea) Ji Ha-young (Japan) Mizuno Kijima (South Korea) Lee Ji-hee
August 31	Port El Kantaoui, Tunisia; Hard $10,000; Singles and doubles draws	(France) Manon Arcangioli; 6–4, 6–3	(Tunisia) Chiraz Bechri	(Slovakia) Michaela Hončová (Oman) Fatma Al-Nabhani	(South Africa) Eden D'Oliveira (Poland) Agata Bieńkowska (Belarus) Darya Chernetsova (Russia) Margarita Lazareva
August 31	Port El Kantaoui, Tunisia; Hard $10,000; Singles and doubles draws	(France) Manon Arcangioli (Slovakia) Michaela Hončová; 6–0, 6–1	(Russia) Vera Aleshcheva (Russia) Maria Zotova	(Slovakia) Michaela Hončová (Oman) Fatma Al-Nabhani	(South Africa) Eden D'Oliveira (Poland) Agata Bieńkowska (Belarus) Darya Chernetsova (Russia) Margarita Lazareva
August 31	Antalya, Turkey; Hard $10,000; Singles and doubles draws	(France) Lou Brouleau; 6–1, 6–1	(Serbia) Nina Stojanović	(Greece) Despina Papamichail (Italy) Cristiana Ferrando	(Russia) Vasilisa Aponasenko (Sweden) Kajsa Rinaldo Persson (Venezuela) Aymet Uzcátegui (Czech Republic) Barbora Štefková
August 31	Antalya, Turkey; Hard $10,000; Singles and doubles draws	(Greece) Despina Papamichail (Serbia) Nina Stojanović; 1–6, 6–1, [10–5]	(Italy) Cristiana Ferrando (Switzerland) Chiara Grimm	(Greece) Despina Papamichail (Italy) Cristiana Ferrando	(Russia) Vasilisa Aponasenko (Sweden) Kajsa Rinaldo Persson (Venezuela) Aymet Uzcátegui (Czech Republic) Barbora Štefková

=== September ===
Week of	Tournament	Winner	Runners-up	Semifinalists	Quarterfinalists
September 7	Engie Open de Biarritz; Biarritz, France; Clay $100,000; Singles – Doubles	(Germany) Laura Siegemund; 7–5, 6–3	(Switzerland) Romina Oprandi	(Czech Republic) Klára Koukalová (Brazil) Teliana Pereira	(Ukraine) Maryna Zanevska (Latvia) Anastasija Sevastova (France) Stéphanie Foretz (Netherlands) Cindy Burger
September 7	Engie Open de Biarritz; Biarritz, France; Clay $100,000; Singles – Doubles	(Turkey) Başak Eraydın (Belarus) Lidziya Marozava; 6–4, 6–4	(Hungary) Réka-Luca Jani (Liechtenstein) Stephanie Vogt	(Czech Republic) Klára Koukalová (Brazil) Teliana Pereira	(Ukraine) Maryna Zanevska (Latvia) Anastasija Sevastova (France) Stéphanie Foretz (Netherlands) Cindy Burger
September 7	Allianz Cup; Sofia, Bulgaria; Clay $25,000; Singles and doubles draws	(Romania) Ana Bogdan; 6–2, 3–6, 7–5	(Russia) Viktoria Kamenskaya	(Russia) Polina Leykina (Georgia (country)) Sofia Shapatava	(Ukraine) Yuliya Beygelzimer (Romania) Cristina Dinu (Austria) Barbara Haas (Romania) Mihaela Buzărnescu
September 7	Allianz Cup; Sofia, Bulgaria; Clay $25,000; Singles and doubles draws	(Georgia (country)) Sofia Shapatava (Ukraine) Anastasiya Vasylyeva; 6–2, 6–2	(Bulgaria) Elitsa Kostova (Czech Republic) Kateřina Kramperová	(Russia) Polina Leykina (Georgia (country)) Sofia Shapatava	(Ukraine) Yuliya Beygelzimer (Romania) Cristina Dinu (Austria) Barbara Haas (Romania) Mihaela Buzărnescu
September 7	Batumi, Georgia; Hard $25,000; Singles and doubles draws	(Turkey) Çağla Büyükakçay; 6–2, 6–0	(Russia) Alena Tarasova	(Uzbekistan) Nigina Abduraimova (Ukraine) Olga Ianchuk	(Georgia (country)) Tinatin Kavlashvili (Georgia (country)) Sofia Kvatsabaia (Uzbekistan) Akgul Amanmuradova (Russia) Natela Dzalamidze
September 7	Batumi, Georgia; Hard $25,000; Singles and doubles draws	(Russia) Natela Dzalamidze (Russia) Alena Tarasova; 5–7, 6–1, [10–7]	(Russia) Angelina Gabueva (Ukraine) Elizaveta Ianchuk	(Uzbekistan) Nigina Abduraimova (Ukraine) Olga Ianchuk	(Georgia (country)) Tinatin Kavlashvili (Georgia (country)) Sofia Kvatsabaia (Uzbekistan) Akgul Amanmuradova (Russia) Natela Dzalamidze
September 7	TEAN International; Alphen aan den Rijn, Netherlands; Clay $25,000; Singles and doubles draws	(Belgium) Marie Benoît; 5–7, 6–3, 6–4	(Croatia) Tena Lukas	(Netherlands) Richèl Hogenkamp (Netherlands) Lesley Kerkhove	(Netherlands) Arantxa Rus (Italy) Gioia Barbieri (Serbia) Ivana Jorović (Netherlands) Quirine Lemoine
September 7	TEAN International; Alphen aan den Rijn, Netherlands; Clay $25,000; Singles and doubles draws	(Netherlands) Quirine Lemoine (Netherlands) Eva Wacanno; 3–6, 6–4, [10–7]	(Netherlands) Lesley Kerkhove (Netherlands) Arantxa Rus	(Netherlands) Richèl Hogenkamp (Netherlands) Lesley Kerkhove	(Netherlands) Arantxa Rus (Italy) Gioia Barbieri (Serbia) Ivana Jorović (Netherlands) Quirine Lemoine
September 7	Pétange, Luxembourg; Hard (indoor) $15,000; Singles and doubles draws	(Belgium) Greet Minnen; 6–0, 3–6, 6–3	(Slovakia) Michaela Hončová	(Sweden) Susanne Celik (Belgium) Elyne Boeykens	(United Kingdom) Harriet Dart (Australia) Sara Tomic (Austria) Pia König (Bosnia and Herzegovina) Dea Herdželaš
September 7	Pétange, Luxembourg; Hard (indoor) $15,000; Singles and doubles draws	(Belgium) Michaela Boev (Germany) Hristina Dishkova; 6–2, 6–3	(France) Manon Arcangioli (United Kingdom) Harriet Dart	(Sweden) Susanne Celik (Belgium) Elyne Boeykens	(United Kingdom) Harriet Dart (Australia) Sara Tomic (Austria) Pia König (Bosnia and Herzegovina) Dea Herdželaš
September 7	Bol, Croatia; Clay $10,000; Singles and doubles draws	(Hungary) Anna Bondár; 7–5, 6–4	(Czech Republic) Magdaléna Pantůčková	(Australia) Alexandra Nancarrow (Slovenia) Natalija Šipek	(Hungary) Luca Nagymihály (Hungary) Rebeka Stolmár (Slovakia) Barbara Kötelesová (China) Ni Ma Zhuoma
September 7	Bol, Croatia; Clay $10,000; Singles and doubles draws	(Samoa) Steffi Carruthers (Russia) Alina Silich; 7–6^{(7–3)}, 3–6, [10–5]	(Slovakia) Barbara Kötelesová (Slovenia) Natalija Šipek	(Australia) Alexandra Nancarrow (Slovenia) Natalija Šipek	(Hungary) Luca Nagymihály (Hungary) Rebeka Stolmár (Slovakia) Barbara Kötelesová (China) Ni Ma Zhuoma
September 7	Prague, Czech Republic; Clay $10,000; Singles and doubles draws	(Slovakia) Lenka Juríková; 6–3, 6–4	(Philippines) Katharina Lehnert	(Czech Republic) Tereza Malíková (Czech Republic) Petra Melounová	(Ukraine) Nadiya Kolb (United States) Dasha Ivanova (Czech Republic) Zuzana Zálabská (Hungary) Ágnes Bukta
September 7	Prague, Czech Republic; Clay $10,000; Singles and doubles draws	(Ukraine) Maryna Kolb (Ukraine) Nadiya Kolb; 6–4, 6–2	(United States) Tina Tehrani (Australia) Karolina Wlodarczak	(Czech Republic) Tereza Malíková (Czech Republic) Petra Melounová	(Ukraine) Nadiya Kolb (United States) Dasha Ivanova (Czech Republic) Zuzana Zálabská (Hungary) Ágnes Bukta
September 7	Sharm el-Sheikh, Egypt; Hard $10,000; Singles and doubles draws	(France) Victoria Muntean; 6–1, 6–0	(China) Lu Jiaxi	(Thailand) Kamonwan Buayam (Russia) Yana Sizikova	(China) Yu Yuanyi (Belgium) Britt Geukens (Russia) Yulia Bryzgalova (Sweden) Brenda Njuki
September 7	Sharm el-Sheikh, Egypt; Hard $10,000; Singles and doubles draws	(Belgium) Britt Geukens (France) Victoria Muntean; 1–6, 6–3, [10–8]	(Thailand) Kamonwan Buayam (Russia) Yana Sizikova	(Thailand) Kamonwan Buayam (Russia) Yana Sizikova	(China) Yu Yuanyi (Belgium) Britt Geukens (Russia) Yulia Bryzgalova (Sweden) Brenda Njuki
September 7	Hyderabad, India; Clay $10,000; Singles and doubles draws	(India) Snehadevi Reddy; 7–6^{(7–4)}, 7–5	(India) Sai Chamarthi	(India) Prerna Bhambri (India) Sri Peddi Reddy	(India) Rishika Sunkara (India) Shweta Rana (India) Nidhi Chilumula (India) Sowjanya Bavisetti
September 7	Hyderabad, India; Clay $10,000; Singles and doubles draws	(India) Sowjanya Bavisetti (India) Rishika Sunkara; 6–3, 6–4	(India) Prerna Bhambri (India) Prarthana Thombare	(India) Prerna Bhambri (India) Sri Peddi Reddy	(India) Rishika Sunkara (India) Shweta Rana (India) Nidhi Chilumula (India) Sowjanya Bavisetti
September 7	Tiberias, Israel; Hard $10,000; Singles and doubles draws	(Israel) Deniz Khazaniuk; 6–0, 7–5	(Hungary) Naomi Totka	(Israel) Saray Sterenbach (United Kingdom) Francesca Stephenson	(Montenegro) Ana Veselinović (Israel) Keren Shlomo (Chinese Taipei) Fan Chiang Sing-le (Germany) Katharina Hering
September 7	Tiberias, Israel; Hard $10,000; Singles and doubles draws	(Germany) Katharina Hering (Hungary) Naomi Totka; 6–4, 7–6^{(7–5)}	(United Kingdom) Francesca Stephenson (Montenegro) Ana Veselinović	(Israel) Saray Sterenbach (United Kingdom) Francesca Stephenson	(Montenegro) Ana Veselinović (Israel) Keren Shlomo (Chinese Taipei) Fan Chiang Sing-le (Germany) Katharina Hering
September 7	Pula, Italy; Clay $10,000; Singles and doubles draws	(Italy) Alice Balducci; 6–3, 6–2	(France) Carla Touly	(Greece) Despina Papamichail (Italy) Camilla Scala	(Italy) Federica Arcidiacono (Belgium) Kimberley Zimmermann (Italy) Martina Di Giuseppe (Italy) Anna Remondina
September 7	Pula, Italy; Clay $10,000; Singles and doubles draws	(Greece) Despina Papamichail (France) Carla Touly; 6–3, 6–4	(Switzerland) Nina Stadler (Belgium) Kimberley Zimmermann	(Greece) Despina Papamichail (Italy) Camilla Scala	(Italy) Federica Arcidiacono (Belgium) Kimberley Zimmermann (Italy) Martina Di Giuseppe (Italy) Anna Remondina
September 7	Kyoto, Japan; Hard (indoor) $10,000; Singles and doubles draws	(Japan) Sachie Ishizu; 3–6, 6–1, 6–1	(Japan) Yurina Koshino	(Japan) Akari Inoue (Japan) Miki Miyamura	(Chinese Taipei) Lee Pei-chi (Japan) Shiho Akita (Japan) Chihiro Nunome (Japan) Chiaki Okadaue
September 7	Kyoto, Japan; Hard (indoor) $10,000; Singles and doubles draws	(Japan) Akari Inoue (Japan) Miki Miyamura; 6–3, 6–0	(Chinese Taipei) Hsu Ching-wen (Chinese Taipei) Lee Pei-chi	(Japan) Akari Inoue (Japan) Miki Miyamura	(Chinese Taipei) Lee Pei-chi (Japan) Shiho Akita (Japan) Chihiro Nunome (Japan) Chiaki Okadaue
September 7	Yeongwol, South Korea; Hard $10,000; Singles and doubles draws	(China) You Xiaodi; 7–5, 6–2	(China) Zhao Di	(South Korea) Jeong Sunam (China) Zhang Yukun	(South Korea) Choi Ji-hee (South Korea) Lee Se-jin (China) Sheng Yuqi (Japan) Kanami Tsuji
September 7	Yeongwol, South Korea; Hard $10,000; Singles and doubles draws	(South Korea) Kim Dabin (China) Wei Zhanlan; 6–1, 6–0	(China) Sheng Yuqi (China) Zhao Di	(South Korea) Jeong Sunam (China) Zhang Yukun	(South Korea) Choi Ji-hee (South Korea) Lee Se-jin (China) Sheng Yuqi (Japan) Kanami Tsuji
September 7	Port El Kantaoui, Tunisia; Hard $10,000; Singles and doubles draws	(France) Joséphine Boualem; 7–6^{(7–4)}, 6–0	(Tunisia) Chiraz Bechri	(Russia) Margarita Lazareva (Belarus) Sadafmoh Tolibova	(Italy) Marianna Natali (France) Pauline Payet (France) Anna Jovanovic (Poland) Agata Bieńkowska
September 7	Port El Kantaoui, Tunisia; Hard $10,000; Singles and doubles draws	(Tunisia) Chiraz Bechri (Belarus) Valeria Mishina; 6–3, 6–3	(Italy) Federica Joe Gardella (Italy) Marianna Natali	(Russia) Margarita Lazareva (Belarus) Sadafmoh Tolibova	(Italy) Marianna Natali (France) Pauline Payet (France) Anna Jovanovic (Poland) Agata Bieńkowska
September 7	Antalya, Turkey; Hard $10,000; Singles and doubles draws	(Russia) Ksenia Gaydarzhi; 7–6^{(7–3)}, 6–1	(Sweden) Fanny Östlund	(Sweden) Kajsa Rinaldo Persson (Switzerland) Chiara Frapolli	(Croatia) Ena Kajević (Slovakia) Chantal Škamlová (Sweden) Jacqueline Cabaj Awad (Austria) Natasha Bredl
September 7	Antalya, Turkey; Hard $10,000; Singles and doubles draws	(Sweden) Jacqueline Cabaj Awad (Sweden) Kajsa Rinaldo Persson; 6–3, 6–4	(Paraguay) Sara Giménez (Sweden) Fanny Östlund	(Sweden) Kajsa Rinaldo Persson (Switzerland) Chiara Frapolli	(Croatia) Ena Kajević (Slovakia) Chantal Škamlová (Sweden) Jacqueline Cabaj Awad (Austria) Natasha Bredl
September 14	L'Open Emeraude Solaire de Saint-Malo; Saint-Malo, France; Clay $50,000+H; Singles – Doubles	(Russia) Daria Kasatkina; 7–5, 7–6^{(7–4)}	(Germany) Laura Siegemund	(Liechtenstein) Stephanie Vogt (Spain) Lourdes Domínguez Lino	(Brazil) Teliana Pereira (Spain) Laura Pous Tió (Latvia) Anastasija Sevastova (Estonia) Kaia Kanepi
September 14	L'Open Emeraude Solaire de Saint-Malo; Saint-Malo, France; Clay $50,000+H; Singles – Doubles	(Slovakia) Kristína Kučová (Latvia) Anastasija Sevastova; 6–7^{(1–7)}, 6–3, [10–5]	(Russia) Maria Marfutina (Russia) Natalia Vikhlyantseva	(Liechtenstein) Stephanie Vogt (Spain) Lourdes Domínguez Lino	(Brazil) Teliana Pereira (Spain) Laura Pous Tió (Latvia) Anastasija Sevastova (Estonia) Kaia Kanepi
September 14	Izida Cup; Dobrich, Bulgaria; Clay $25,000; Singles and doubles draws	(Slovenia) Tamara Zidanšek; 6–3, 6–2	(Russia) Polina Leykina	(Turkey) Çağla Büyükakçay (Romania) Cristina Dinu	(Czech Republic) Kateřina Kramperová (Bulgaria) Isabella Shinikova (Germany) Anne Schäfer (Romania) Ana Bogdan
September 14	Izida Cup; Dobrich, Bulgaria; Clay $25,000; Singles and doubles draws	(Georgia (country)) Sofia Shapatava (Ukraine) Anastasiya Vasylyeva; 6–2, 6–0	(Bulgaria) Elitsa Kostova (Czech Republic) Kateřina Kramperová	(Turkey) Çağla Büyükakçay (Romania) Cristina Dinu	(Czech Republic) Kateřina Kramperová (Bulgaria) Isabella Shinikova (Germany) Anne Schäfer (Romania) Ana Bogdan
September 14	Monterrey, Mexico; Hard $25,000; Singles and doubles draws	(Croatia) Tereza Mrdeža; 6–0, 6–7^{(2–7)}, 6–3	(Chile) Alexa Guarachi	(Mexico) Victoria Rodríguez (Czech Republic) Marie Bouzková	(Slovenia) Dalila Jakupović (Italy) Jasmine Paolini (Belgium) Elise Mertens (Argentina) Nadia Podoroska
September 14	Monterrey, Mexico; Hard $25,000; Singles and doubles draws	(Slovenia) Tadeja Majerič (Switzerland) Conny Perrin; 7–5, 6–3	(Chile) Alexa Guarachi (Chinese Taipei) Hsu Chieh-yu	(Mexico) Victoria Rodríguez (Czech Republic) Marie Bouzková	(Slovenia) Dalila Jakupović (Italy) Jasmine Paolini (Belgium) Elise Mertens (Argentina) Nadia Podoroska
September 14	Royal Cup NLB Montenegro; Podgorica, Montenegro; Clay $25,000; Singles and doubles draws	(Austria) Barbara Haas; 6–3, 6–1	(Serbia) Doroteja Erić	(Czech Republic) Gabriela Pantůčková (Bosnia and Herzegovina) Dea Herdželaš	(Croatia) Jana Fett (France) Fiona Ferro (Italy) Martina Trevisan (Croatia) Tena Lukas
September 14	Royal Cup NLB Montenegro; Podgorica, Montenegro; Clay $25,000; Singles and doubles draws	(North Macedonia) Lina Gjorcheska (Turkey) Melis Sezer; 6–0, 6–0	(Montenegro) Nikoleta Bulatović (Montenegro) Nina Kalezić	(Czech Republic) Gabriela Pantůčková (Bosnia and Herzegovina) Dea Herdželaš	(Croatia) Jana Fett (France) Fiona Ferro (Italy) Martina Trevisan (Croatia) Tena Lukas
September 14	Redding, United States; Hard $25,000; Singles and doubles draws	(Canada) Heidi El Tabakh; 6–1, 6–3	(France) Sherazad Reix	(United States) Vania King (Brazil) Paula Cristina Gonçalves	(United States) Caitlin Whoriskey (Belgium) Klaartje Liebens (Germany) Anna Zaja (Thailand) Varatchaya Wongteanchai
September 14	Redding, United States; Hard $25,000; Singles and doubles draws	(United States) Ashley Weinhold (United States) Caitlin Whoriskey; 6–2, 7–5	(South Africa) Michelle Sammons (Thailand) Varatchaya Wongteanchai	(United States) Vania King (Brazil) Paula Cristina Gonçalves	(United States) Caitlin Whoriskey (Belgium) Klaartje Liebens (Germany) Anna Zaja (Thailand) Varatchaya Wongteanchai
September 14	Tlemcen, Algeria; Clay $10,000; Singles and doubles draws	(Belgium) Déborah Kerfs; 6–3, 6–3	(Germany) Nora Niedmers	(France) Marine Partaud (Germany) Jasmin Jebawy	(France) Amandine Cazeaux (Algeria) Inès Ibbou (Russia) Polina Novoselova (France) Kassandra Davesne
September 14	Tlemcen, Algeria; Clay $10,000; Singles and doubles draws	(Belgium) Déborah Kerfs (France) Marine Partaud; 6–3, 4–6, [10–6]	(France) Amandine Cazeaux (Germany) Nora Niedmers	(France) Marine Partaud (Germany) Jasmin Jebawy	(France) Amandine Cazeaux (Algeria) Inès Ibbou (Russia) Polina Novoselova (France) Kassandra Davesne
September 14	Brčko, Bosnia and Herzegovina; Clay $10,000; Singles and doubles draws	(Croatia) Nina Alibalić; 6–4, 4–6, 7–6^{(7–3)}	(Slovenia) Nina Potočnik	(Serbia) Tamara Čurović (Hungary) Lilla Barzó	(Russia) Anna Makhorkina (Hungary) Csilla Argyelán (Hungary) Ágnes Bukta (Bosnia and Herzegovina) Anita Husarić
September 14	Brčko, Bosnia and Herzegovina; Clay $10,000; Singles and doubles draws	(Hungary) Ágnes Bukta (Slovakia) Vivien Juhászová; 5–7, 6–4, [10–8]	(Bosnia and Herzegovina) Anita Husarić (Austria) Janina Toljan	(Serbia) Tamara Čurović (Hungary) Lilla Barzó	(Russia) Anna Makhorkina (Hungary) Csilla Argyelán (Hungary) Ágnes Bukta (Bosnia and Herzegovina) Anita Husarić
September 14	Bol, Croatia; Clay $10,000; Singles and doubles draws	(Norway) Melanie Stokke; 5–7, 6–3, 6–4	(Croatia) Iva Primorac	(Switzerland) Karin Kennel (Slovakia) Natália Vajdová	(Slovenia) Natalija Šipek (Hungary) Szabina Szlavikovics (Sweden) Hilda Melander (Slovenia) Polona Reberšak
September 14	Bol, Croatia; Clay $10,000; Singles and doubles draws	(Czech Republic) Lenka Kunčíková (Germany) Julia Wachaczyk; 6–3, 4–6, [10–6]	(Switzerland) Karin Kennel (Croatia) Iva Primorac	(Switzerland) Karin Kennel (Slovakia) Natália Vajdová	(Slovenia) Natalija Šipek (Hungary) Szabina Szlavikovics (Sweden) Hilda Melander (Slovenia) Polona Reberšak
September 14	Sharm el-Sheikh, Egypt; Hard $10,000; Singles and doubles draws	(Romania) Jaqueline Cristian; 6–4, 6–1	(South Africa) Madrie Le Roux	(Russia) Kseniia Bekker (Italy) Giada Clerici	(Russia) Anastasiya Saitova (Sweden) Brenda Njuki (United Kingdom) Freya Christie (Russia) Sabina Shaydullina
September 14	Sharm el-Sheikh, Egypt; Hard $10,000; Singles and doubles draws	(China) Lu Jiaxi (Sweden) Brenda Njuki; 4–6, 7–6^{(7–4)}, [10–5]	(United Kingdom) Freya Christie (Romania) Jaqueline Cristian	(Russia) Kseniia Bekker (Italy) Giada Clerici	(Russia) Anastasiya Saitova (Sweden) Brenda Njuki (United Kingdom) Freya Christie (Russia) Sabina Shaydullina
September 14	Telavi Open; Telavi, Georgia; Clay $10,000; Singles and doubles draws	(Georgia (country)) Ekaterine Gorgodze; 5–7, 6–2, 6–2	(Armenia) Ani Amiraghyan	(Uzbekistan) Sabina Sharipova (Russia) Anastasia Pribylova	(Russia) Polina Novikova (Russia) Daria Lodikova (Russia) Amina Anshba (Russia) Valentina Kulikova
September 14	Telavi Open; Telavi, Georgia; Clay $10,000; Singles and doubles draws	(Armenia) Ani Amiraghyan (Russia) Amina Anshba; 6–1, 6–1	(Russia) Polina Golubovskaya (Russia) Alina Kislitskaya	(Uzbekistan) Sabina Sharipova (Russia) Anastasia Pribylova	(Russia) Polina Novikova (Russia) Daria Lodikova (Russia) Amina Anshba (Russia) Valentina Kulikova
September 14	Hyderabad, India; Clay $10,000; Singles and doubles draws	(Oman) Fatma Al-Nabhani; 6–4, 6–0	(India) Prerna Bhambri	(India) Prarthana Thombare (India) Rishika Sunkara	(India) Sowjanya Bavisetti (India) Sharmada Balu (India) Shweta Rana (India) Pranjala Yadlapalli
September 14	Hyderabad, India; Clay $10,000; Singles and doubles draws	(Oman) Fatma Al-Nabhani (India) Prerna Bhambri; 7–5, 6–2	(India) Sharmada Balu (India) Prarthana Thombare	(India) Prarthana Thombare (India) Rishika Sunkara	(India) Sowjanya Bavisetti (India) Sharmada Balu (India) Shweta Rana (India) Pranjala Yadlapalli
September 14	Pula, Italy; Clay $10,000; Singles and doubles draws	(United Kingdom) Amanda Carreras; 6–4, 6–3	(Italy) Jessica Pieri	(Italy) Corinna Dentoni (Italy) Martina Di Giuseppe	(Italy) Bianca Turati (Italy) Valentine Confalonieri (Italy) Camilla Scala (Switzerland) Tess Sugnaux
September 14	Pula, Italy; Clay $10,000; Singles and doubles draws	(Switzerland) Nina Stadler (Belgium) Kimberley Zimmermann; 6–0, 6–1	(Italy) Alice Balducci (Italy) Camilla Scala	(Italy) Corinna Dentoni (Italy) Martina Di Giuseppe	(Italy) Bianca Turati (Italy) Valentine Confalonieri (Italy) Camilla Scala (Switzerland) Tess Sugnaux
September 14	Madrid, Spain; Hard $10,000; Singles and doubles draws	(Spain) Cristina Sánchez Quintanar; 6–2, 6–2	(Russia) Ekaterina Yashina	(Spain) Estrella Cabeza Candela (Spain) Rocío de la Torre Sánchez	(Russia) Elena Belenova (France) Estelle Cascino (United Kingdom) Isabelle Wallace (Spain) Irene Burillo Escorihuela
September 14	Madrid, Spain; Hard $10,000; Singles and doubles draws	(Spain) Estrella Cabeza Candela (Spain) Cristina Sánchez Quintanar; 7–6^{(7–4)}, 7–5	(Italy) Deborah Chiesa (United Kingdom) Isabelle Wallace	(Spain) Estrella Cabeza Candela (Spain) Rocío de la Torre Sánchez	(Russia) Elena Belenova (France) Estelle Cascino (United Kingdom) Isabelle Wallace (Spain) Irene Burillo Escorihuela
September 14	Port El Kantaoui, Tunisia; Hard $10,000; Singles and doubles draws	(Belgium) Magali Kempen; 6–2, 1–6, 6–4	(France) Joséphine Boualem	(France) Manon Arcangioli (Russia) Margarita Lazareva	(Russia) Olga Doroshina (Belarus) Sadafmoh Tolibova (Germany) Dana Kremer (France) Anna Jovanovic
September 14	Port El Kantaoui, Tunisia; Hard $10,000; Singles and doubles draws	(France) Manon Arcangioli (Belarus) Sadafmoh Tolibova; 3–6, 6–3, [10–6]	(Russia) Olga Doroshina (Russia) Margarita Lazareva	(France) Manon Arcangioli (Russia) Margarita Lazareva	(Russia) Olga Doroshina (Belarus) Sadafmoh Tolibova (Germany) Dana Kremer (France) Anna Jovanovic
September 14	Antalya, Turkey; Hard $10,000; Singles and doubles draws	(Russia) Marta Paigina; 7–6^{(7–3)}, 6–3	(Slovakia) Chantal Škamlová	(South Africa) Ilze Hattingh (Russia) Anastasia Gasanova	(Liechtenstein) Kathinka von Deichmann (Sweden) Jacqueline Cabaj Awad (Austria) Lisa-Maria Moser (China) Wang Yan
September 14	Antalya, Turkey; Hard $10,000; Singles and doubles draws	(South Africa) Ilze Hattingh (Slovakia) Chantal Škamlová; 7–6^{(7–3)}, 3–6, [10–2]	(Poland) Agata Barańska (China) Wang Yan	(South Africa) Ilze Hattingh (Russia) Anastasia Gasanova	(Liechtenstein) Kathinka von Deichmann (Sweden) Jacqueline Cabaj Awad (Austria) Lisa-Maria Moser (China) Wang Yan
September 14	Bucha, Ukraine; Clay $10,000; Singles and doubles draws	(Russia) Victoria Kan; 4–6, 6–2, 6–0	(Moldova) Alexandra Perper	(Ukraine) Alyona Sotnikova (Ukraine) Ganna Poznikhirenko	(Ukraine) Helen Ploskina (Ukraine) Anastasiya Shoshyna (Kyrgyzstan) Ksenia Ulukan (Kazakhstan) Kamila Kerimbayeva
September 14	Bucha, Ukraine; Clay $10,000; Singles and doubles draws	(Ukraine) Alona Fomina (Ukraine) Oleksandra Korashvili; 6–4, 6–3	(Ukraine) Olga Ianchuk (Russia) Victoria Kan	(Ukraine) Alyona Sotnikova (Ukraine) Ganna Poznikhirenko	(Ukraine) Helen Ploskina (Ukraine) Anastasiya Shoshyna (Kyrgyzstan) Ksenia Ulukan (Kazakhstan) Kamila Kerimbayeva
September 21	Coleman Vision Tennis Championships; Albuquerque, United States; Hard $75,000; Singles – Doubles	(Netherlands) Michaëlla Krajicek; 6–7^{(2–7)}, 7–6^{(7–3)}, 7–5	(United Kingdom) Naomi Broady	(Switzerland) Amra Sadiković (United States) Julia Boserup	(Belgium) An-Sophie Mestach (Austria) Tamira Paszek (United States) Vania King (United States) Anna Tatishvili
September 21	Coleman Vision Tennis Championships; Albuquerque, United States; Hard $75,000; Singles – Doubles	(Brazil) Paula Cristina Gonçalves (United States) Sanaz Marand; 4–6, 6–2, [10–3]	(Austria) Tamira Paszek (United States) Anna Tatishvili	(Switzerland) Amra Sadiković (United States) Julia Boserup	(Belgium) An-Sophie Mestach (Austria) Tamira Paszek (United States) Vania King (United States) Anna Tatishvili
September 21	Internacional Femenil Monterrey; Monterrey, Mexico; Hard $50,000; Singles – Doubles	(Belgium) Ysaline Bonaventure; 6–1, 6–2	(Paraguay) Montserrat González	(Mexico) Marcela Zacarías (Croatia) Ana Vrljić	(Mexico) Ana Sofía Sánchez (Turkey) İpek Soylu (Italy) Cristiana Ferrando (Russia) Marina Melnikova
September 21	Internacional Femenil Monterrey; Monterrey, Mexico; Hard $50,000; Singles – Doubles	(Belgium) Ysaline Bonaventure (Belgium) Elise Mertens; 6–4, 3–6, [11–9]	(Russia) Marina Melnikova (Luxembourg) Mandy Minella	(Mexico) Marcela Zacarías (Croatia) Ana Vrljić	(Mexico) Ana Sofía Sánchez (Turkey) İpek Soylu (Italy) Cristiana Ferrando (Russia) Marina Melnikova
September 21	Bucha, Ukraine; Clay $25,000; Singles and doubles draws	(Slovakia) Kristína Kučová; 4–6, 7–6^{(7–5)}, 6–0	(Romania) Alexandra Cadanțu	(Ukraine) Olga Ianchuk (Turkey) Çağla Büyükakçay	(Bosnia and Herzegovina) Dea Herdželaš (Russia) Victoria Kan (Russia) Valentyna Ivakhnenko (Ukraine) Ganna Poznikhirenko
September 21	Bucha, Ukraine; Clay $25,000; Singles and doubles draws	(Georgia (country)) Ekaterine Gorgodze (Georgia (country)) Sofia Shapatava; 7–5, 6–2	(Ukraine) Olga Ianchuk (Ukraine) Anastasiya Vasylyeva	(Ukraine) Olga Ianchuk (Turkey) Çağla Büyükakçay	(Bosnia and Herzegovina) Dea Herdželaš (Russia) Victoria Kan (Russia) Valentyna Ivakhnenko (Ukraine) Ganna Poznikhirenko
September 21	Bangkok, Thailand; Hard $15,000; Singles and doubles draws	(Japan) Hiroko Kuwata; 6–3, 7–6^{(7–4)}	(Thailand) Bunyawi Thamchaiwat	(France) Lou Brouleau (Thailand) Noppawan Lertcheewakarn	(Thailand) Nudnida Luangnam (Japan) Yuuki Tanaka (South Africa) Chanel Simmonds (Thailand) Kamonwan Buayam
September 21	Bangkok, Thailand; Hard $15,000; Singles and doubles draws	(Japan) Hiroko Kuwata (Japan) Ayaka Okuno; 2–6, 6–1, [10–6]	(Japan) Mana Ayukawa (Japan) Yuuki Tanaka	(France) Lou Brouleau (Thailand) Noppawan Lertcheewakarn	(Thailand) Nudnida Luangnam (Japan) Yuuki Tanaka (South Africa) Chanel Simmonds (Thailand) Kamonwan Buayam
September 21	Algiers, Algeria; Clay $10,000; Singles and doubles draws	(France) Harmony Tan; 7–5, 7–5	(France) Amandine Cazeaux	(Belgium) Déborah Kerfs (France) Kassandra Davesne	(Algeria) Amira Benaissa (India) Asha Nanda Kumar (Germany) Nora Niedmers (Austria) Kerstin Peckl
September 21	Algiers, Algeria; Clay $10,000; Singles and doubles draws	(Belgium) Déborah Kerfs (France) Marine Partaud; 3–6, 6–2, [10–2]	(France) Amandine Cazeaux (Germany) Nora Niedmers	(Belgium) Déborah Kerfs (France) Kassandra Davesne	(Algeria) Amira Benaissa (India) Asha Nanda Kumar (Germany) Nora Niedmers (Austria) Kerstin Peckl
September 21	San Carlos Centro, Argentina; Clay $10,000; Singles and doubles draws	(Brazil) Eduarda Piai; 6–1, 2–6, 6–3	(Chile) Daniela Seguel	(Brazil) Nathaly Kurata (Argentina) Catalina Pella	(Brazil) Nathália Rossi (Argentina) Sofía Luini (Brazil) Giovanna Tomita (Argentina) Guadalupe Pérez Rojas
September 21	San Carlos Centro, Argentina; Clay $10,000; Singles and doubles draws	(Bolivia) María Fernanda Álvarez Terán (Argentina) Catalina Pella; 6–2, 6–0	(Chile) Bárbara Gatica (Argentina) Stephanie Mariel Petit	(Brazil) Nathaly Kurata (Argentina) Catalina Pella	(Brazil) Nathália Rossi (Argentina) Sofía Luini (Brazil) Giovanna Tomita (Argentina) Guadalupe Pérez Rojas
September 21	Varna, Bulgaria; Clay $10,000; Singles and doubles draws	(Bulgaria) Isabella Shinikova; 7–6^{(7–2)}, 6–4	(Romania) Irina Maria Bara	(Romania) Oana Georgeta Simion (Bulgaria) Petia Arshinkova	(Romania) Cristina Adamescu (Germany) Caroline Übelhör (Russia) Anna Makhorkina (Bulgaria) Viktoriya Tomova
September 21	Varna, Bulgaria; Clay $10,000; Singles and doubles draws	(Romania) Irina Maria Bara (Bulgaria) Isabella Shinikova; 7–5, 4–6, [10–4]	(Argentina) Julieta Estable (Argentina) Ana Victoria Gobbi Monllau	(Romania) Oana Georgeta Simion (Bulgaria) Petia Arshinkova	(Romania) Cristina Adamescu (Germany) Caroline Übelhör (Russia) Anna Makhorkina (Bulgaria) Viktoriya Tomova
September 21	Bol, Croatia; Clay $10,000; Singles and doubles draws	(Croatia) Iva Primorac; 6–2, 6–2	(Slovakia) Natália Vajdová	(Norway) Melanie Stokke (North Macedonia) Lina Gjorcheska	(Italy) Anna Turati (Hungary) Szabina Szlavikovics (Slovenia) Polona Reberšak (Netherlands) Mandy Wagemaker
September 21	Bol, Croatia; Clay $10,000; Singles and doubles draws	(Croatia) Mariana Dražić (North Macedonia) Lina Gjorcheska; 7–6^{(7–5)}, 6–3	(Germany) Julia Wachaczyk (Netherlands) Mandy Wagemaker	(Norway) Melanie Stokke (North Macedonia) Lina Gjorcheska	(Italy) Anna Turati (Hungary) Szabina Szlavikovics (Slovenia) Polona Reberšak (Netherlands) Mandy Wagemaker
September 21	Brno, Czech Republic; Clay $10,000; Singles and doubles draws	(Germany) Tamara Korpatsch; 4–6, 7–6^{(7–3)}, 7–6^{(7–3)}	(Czech Republic) Vendula Žovincová	(Hungary) Ágnes Bukta (Czech Republic) Gabriela Pantůčková	(Russia) Ekaterina Alexandrova (Czech Republic) Tereza Malíková (Slovakia) Lenka Juríková (Czech Republic) Diana Šumová
September 21	Brno, Czech Republic; Clay $10,000; Singles and doubles draws	(Czech Republic) Kristýna Hrabalová (Czech Republic) Nikola Tomanová; 6–2, 2–6, [11–9]	(Hungary) Ágnes Bukta (Poland) Veronika Domagała	(Hungary) Ágnes Bukta (Czech Republic) Gabriela Pantůčková	(Russia) Ekaterina Alexandrova (Czech Republic) Tereza Malíková (Slovakia) Lenka Juríková (Czech Republic) Diana Šumová
September 21	Sharm el-Sheikh, Egypt; Hard $10,000; Singles and doubles draws	(Slovakia) Viktória Kužmová; 7–6^{(7–4)}, 7–5	(United Kingdom) Freya Christie	(Romania) Ana Bianca Mihăilă (China) Lu Jiaxi	(Russia) Kseniia Bekker (Russia) Anastasiya Saitova (Sweden) Brenda Njuki (Russia) Sabina Shaydullina
September 21	Sharm el-Sheikh, Egypt; Hard $10,000; Singles and doubles draws	(China) Lu Jiaxi (Czech Republic) Martina Přádová; 7–5, 7–5	(Belarus) Lizaveta Hancharova (Italy) Anna Procacci	(Romania) Ana Bianca Mihăilă (China) Lu Jiaxi	(Russia) Kseniia Bekker (Russia) Anastasiya Saitova (Sweden) Brenda Njuki (Russia) Sabina Shaydullina
September 21	Hyderabad, India; Clay $10,000; Singles and doubles draws	(Oman) Fatma Al-Nabhani; 6–3, 6–1	(India) Rishika Sunkara	(India) Riya Bhatia (India) Prerna Bhambri	(India) Nidhi Chilumula (India) Prarthana Thombare (India) Pranjala Yadlapalli (India) Sri Peddi Reddy
September 21	Hyderabad, India; Clay $10,000; Singles and doubles draws	(India) Sharmada Balu (India) Prarthana Thombare; 2–6, 6–3, [12–10]	(India) Nidhi Chilumula (India) Rishika Sunkara	(India) Riya Bhatia (India) Prerna Bhambri	(India) Nidhi Chilumula (India) Prarthana Thombare (India) Pranjala Yadlapalli (India) Sri Peddi Reddy
September 21	Solo, Indonesia; Hard $10,000; Singles and doubles draws	(Netherlands) Chayenne Ewijk; 6–4, 5–7, 6–2	(Chinese Taipei) Lee Pei-chi	(Indonesia) Beatrice Gumulya (Japan) Kanami Tsuji	(India) Dhruthi Tatachar Venugopal (Japan) Yurina Koshino (Japan) Hirono Watanabe (China) Zhang Yukun
September 21	Solo, Indonesia; Hard $10,000; Singles and doubles draws	(Indonesia) Beatrice Gumulya (Indonesia) Jessy Rompies; 6–3, 7–5	(Malaysia) Jawairiah Noordin (Indonesia) Vita Taher	(Indonesia) Beatrice Gumulya (Japan) Kanami Tsuji	(India) Dhruthi Tatachar Venugopal (Japan) Yurina Koshino (Japan) Hirono Watanabe (China) Zhang Yukun
September 21	Pula, Italy; Clay $10,000; Singles and doubles draws	(Italy) Jessica Pieri; 6–1, 3–6, 6–4	(Italy) Bianca Turati	(United Kingdom) Amanda Carreras (Italy) Stefania Rubini	(Italy) Martina Spigarelli (Italy) Camilla Scala (Belgium) Kimberley Zimmermann (Switzerland) Tess Sugnaux
September 21	Pula, Italy; Clay $10,000; Singles and doubles draws	(Italy) Ludmilla Samsonova (Italy) Bianca Turati; 6–4, 6–2	(Belgium) India Maggen (Switzerland) Tess Sugnaux	(United Kingdom) Amanda Carreras (Italy) Stefania Rubini	(Italy) Martina Spigarelli (Italy) Camilla Scala (Belgium) Kimberley Zimmermann (Switzerland) Tess Sugnaux
September 21	Madrid, Spain; Hard $10,000; Singles and doubles draws	(United Kingdom) Katie Swan; 6–7^{(5–7)}, 6–2, 6–3	(Spain) Cristina Sánchez Quintanar	(Switzerland) Rebeka Masarova (Spain) Estrella Cabeza Candela	(Spain) Estela Pérez Somarriba (Spain) Eva Guerrero Álvarez (United Kingdom) Isabelle Wallace (Spain) Cristina Bucșa
September 21	Madrid, Spain; Hard $10,000; Singles and doubles draws	(Spain) Estrella Cabeza Candela (Spain) Cristina Sánchez Quintanar; 6–4, 6–3	(Spain) María Martínez Martínez (Spain) Olga Sáez Larra	(Switzerland) Rebeka Masarova (Spain) Estrella Cabeza Candela	(Spain) Estela Pérez Somarriba (Spain) Eva Guerrero Álvarez (United Kingdom) Isabelle Wallace (Spain) Cristina Bucșa
September 21	Port El Kantaoui, Tunisia; Hard $10,000; Singles and doubles draws	(France) Caroline Roméo; 6–3, 1–6, 6–0	(Russia) Yana Sizikova	(Sweden) Anette Munozova (Germany) Dana Kremer	(Ecuador) Charlotte Römer (France) Joséphine Boualem (Serbia) Bojana Marinković (Russia) Olga Doroshina
September 21	Port El Kantaoui, Tunisia; Hard $10,000; Singles and doubles draws	(Russia) Olga Doroshina (Russia) Yana Sizikova; 6–2, 6–2	(Germany) Lisa-Marie Mätschke (Belarus) Anastasiya Shleptsova	(Sweden) Anette Munozova (Germany) Dana Kremer	(Ecuador) Charlotte Römer (France) Joséphine Boualem (Serbia) Bojana Marinković (Russia) Olga Doroshina
September 21	Antalya, Turkey; Hard $10,000; Singles and doubles draws	(Slovakia) Vivien Juhászová; 5–7, 6–2, 6–4	(Bulgaria) Julia Stamatova	(Sweden) Fanny Östlund (Slovakia) Chantal Škamlová	(Liechtenstein) Kathinka von Deichmann (Venezuela) Aymet Uzcátegui (Turkey) Ayla Aksu (Germany) Jil Nora Engelmann
September 21	Antalya, Turkey; Hard $10,000; Singles and doubles draws	(Turkey) Ayla Aksu (Bulgaria) Julia Stamatova; 7–5, 6–3	(Slovakia) Tamara Kupková (Russia) Elina Nepliy	(Sweden) Fanny Östlund (Slovakia) Chantal Škamlová	(Liechtenstein) Kathinka von Deichmann (Venezuela) Aymet Uzcátegui (Turkey) Ayla Aksu (Germany) Jil Nora Engelmann
September 28	Zhuhai ITF Women's Pro Circuit; Zhuhai, China; Hard $50,000; Singles – Doubles	(Chinese Taipei) Chang Kai-chen; 4–6, 6–1, 7–6^{(7–0)}	(China) Zhang Yuxuan	(Hong Kong) Zhang Ling (China) Xu Shilin	(Japan) Riko Sawayanagi (Japan) Miyu Kato (China) Zhang Shuai (Chinese Taipei) Lee Ya-hsuan
September 28	Zhuhai ITF Women's Pro Circuit; Zhuhai, China; Hard $50,000; Singles – Doubles	(China) Xu Shilin (China) You Xiaodi; 3–6, 6–2, [10–4]	(Russia) Irina Khromacheva (United Kingdom) Emily Webley-Smith	(Hong Kong) Zhang Ling (China) Xu Shilin	(Japan) Riko Sawayanagi (Japan) Miyu Kato (China) Zhang Shuai (Chinese Taipei) Lee Ya-hsuan
September 28	Abierto Victoria; Victoria, Mexico; Hard $50,000; Singles – Doubles	(Belgium) Elise Mertens; 6–4, 6–3	(France) Amandine Hesse	(Mexico) Marcela Zacarías (France) Pauline Parmentier	(Spain) Lourdes Domínguez Lino (United States) Kristie Ahn (Brazil) Gabriela Cé (Argentina) Nadia Podoroska
September 28	Abierto Victoria; Victoria, Mexico; Hard $50,000; Singles – Doubles	(Belgium) Ysaline Bonaventure (Belgium) Elise Mertens; 6–4, 4–6, [10–6]	(Argentina) María Irigoyen (Czech Republic) Barbora Krejčíková	(Mexico) Marcela Zacarías (France) Pauline Parmentier	(Spain) Lourdes Domínguez Lino (United States) Kristie Ahn (Brazil) Gabriela Cé (Argentina) Nadia Podoroska
September 28	Red Rock Pro Open; Las Vegas, United States; Hard $50,000; Singles – Doubles	(Netherlands) Michaëlla Krajicek; 6–3, 6–1	(United States) Shelby Rogers	(United States) Nicole Gibbs (Switzerland) Romina Oprandi	(Luxembourg) Mandy Minella (United States) Alexa Glatch (United States) Jennifer Brady (United States) Anna Tatishvili
September 28	Red Rock Pro Open; Las Vegas, United States; Hard $50,000; Singles – Doubles	(United States) Julia Boserup (United States) Nicole Gibbs; 6–3, 6–4	(Brazil) Paula Cristina Gonçalves (United States) Sanaz Marand	(United States) Nicole Gibbs (Switzerland) Romina Oprandi	(Luxembourg) Mandy Minella (United States) Alexa Glatch (United States) Jennifer Brady (United States) Anna Tatishvili
September 28	Clermont-Ferrand, France; Hard (indoor) $25,000; Singles and doubles draws	(Russia) Polina Leykina; 4–6, 6–3, 6–4	(Switzerland) Viktorija Golubic	(Ukraine) Olga Fridman (France) Myrtille Georges	(France) Priscilla Heise (France) Mathilde Johansson (France) Julie Coin (Croatia) Jana Fett
September 28	Clermont-Ferrand, France; Hard (indoor) $25,000; Singles and doubles draws	(Russia) Anastasiya Komardina (Serbia) Nina Stojanović; 6–2, 6–1	(Belgium) Elyne Boeykens (Netherlands) Eva Wacanno	(Ukraine) Olga Fridman (France) Myrtille Georges	(France) Priscilla Heise (France) Mathilde Johansson (France) Julie Coin (Croatia) Jana Fett
September 28	Tweed Heads, Australia; Hard $15,000; Singles and doubles draws	(Hungary) Dalma Gálfi; 6–2, 3–6, 6–1	(Australia) Storm Sanders	(United Kingdom) Katy Dunne (Ukraine) Marianna Zakarlyuk	(Australia) Tammi Patterson (Australia) Priscilla Hon (Austria) Pia König (Australia) Naiktha Bains
September 28	Tweed Heads, Australia; Hard $15,000; Singles and doubles draws	(Australia) Kimberly Birrell (Australia) Tammi Patterson; 6–7^{(3–7)}, 6–3, [10–8]	(Hungary) Dalma Gálfi (Australia) Priscilla Hon	(United Kingdom) Katy Dunne (Ukraine) Marianna Zakarlyuk	(Australia) Tammi Patterson (Australia) Priscilla Hon (Austria) Pia König (Australia) Naiktha Bains
September 28	Bangkok, Thailand; Hard $15,000; Singles and doubles draws	(Thailand) Kamonwan Buayam; 6–1, 4–6, 6–2	(Thailand) Varunya Wongteanchai	(Japan) Ayaka Okuno (South Korea) Choi Ji-hee	(France) Alice Bacquié (Thailand) Nicha Lertpitaksinchai (France) Kinnie Laisné (Finland) Emma Laine
September 28	Bangkok, Thailand; Hard $15,000; Singles and doubles draws	(South Korea) Choi Ji-hee (Thailand) Peangtarn Plipuech; 7–5, 6–3	(Chinese Taipei) Hsu Ching-wen (Finland) Emma Laine	(Japan) Ayaka Okuno (South Korea) Choi Ji-hee	(France) Alice Bacquié (Thailand) Nicha Lertpitaksinchai (France) Kinnie Laisné (Finland) Emma Laine
September 28	Santa Fe, Argentina; Clay $10,000; Singles and doubles draws	(Chile) Daniela Seguel; 6–2, 6–1	(Bolivia) María Fernanda Álvarez Terán	(Brazil) Nathaly Kurata (Brazil) Laura Pigossi	(Argentina) Eugenia Ganga (Argentina) Catalina Pella (Chile) Bárbara Gatica (Brazil) Eduarda Piai
September 28	Santa Fe, Argentina; Clay $10,000; Singles and doubles draws	(Bolivia) María Fernanda Álvarez Terán (Brazil) Laura Pigossi; 2–6, 6–2, [10–3]	(Argentina) Catalina Pella (Chile) Daniela Seguel	(Brazil) Nathaly Kurata (Brazil) Laura Pigossi	(Argentina) Eugenia Ganga (Argentina) Catalina Pella (Chile) Bárbara Gatica (Brazil) Eduarda Piai
September 28	Sozopol, Bulgaria; Hard $10,000; Singles and doubles draws	(Bulgaria) Isabella Shinikova; 6–3, 3–0, ret.	(France) Margot Yerolymos	(Romania) Andreea Roșca (Bulgaria) Viktoriya Tomova	(Bulgaria) Julia Terziyska (Argentina) Julieta Estable (Germany) Luisa Marie Huber (Germany) Amelie Intert
September 28	Sozopol, Bulgaria; Hard $10,000; Singles and doubles draws	(Bulgaria) Isabella Shinikova (Bulgaria) Julia Terziyska; 6–2, 6–1	(Germany) Anna Klasen (Germany) Charlotte Klasen	(Romania) Andreea Roșca (Bulgaria) Viktoriya Tomova	(Bulgaria) Julia Terziyska (Argentina) Julieta Estable (Germany) Luisa Marie Huber (Germany) Amelie Intert
September 28	Sharm el-Sheikh, Egypt; Hard $10,000; Singles and doubles draws	(Slovakia) Viktória Kužmová; 6–2, 6–1	(China) Lu Jiaxi	(Belgium) Hélène Scholsen (Sweden) Jacqueline Cabaj Awad	(Austria) Melanie Klaffner (Poland) Paulina Czarnik (Denmark) Cecilie Melsted (Romania) Ana Bianca Mihăilă
September 28	Sharm el-Sheikh, Egypt; Hard $10,000; Singles and doubles draws	(Russia) Varvara Flink (Russia) Veronica Miroshnichenko; 6–3, 6–4	(Sweden) Jacqueline Cabaj Awad (Czech Republic) Martina Přádová	(Belgium) Hélène Scholsen (Sweden) Jacqueline Cabaj Awad	(Austria) Melanie Klaffner (Poland) Paulina Czarnik (Denmark) Cecilie Melsted (Romania) Ana Bianca Mihăilă
September 28	Jakarta, Indonesia; Hard $10,000; Singles and doubles draws	(Japan) Kanami Tsuji; 6–3, 6–4	(Netherlands) Chayenne Ewijk	(Japan) Hirono Watanabe (Chinese Taipei) Lee Pei-chi	(Japan) Haruka Kaji (Japan) Mizuno Kijima (Indonesia) Deria Nur Haliza (China) Zhang Yukun
September 28	Jakarta, Indonesia; Hard $10,000; Singles and doubles draws	(Indonesia) Beatrice Gumulya (Indonesia) Jessy Rompies; 6–4, 7–6^{(7–4)}	(Japan) Haine Ogata (India) Dhruthi Tatachar Venugopal	(Japan) Hirono Watanabe (Chinese Taipei) Lee Pei-chi	(Japan) Haruka Kaji (Japan) Mizuno Kijima (Indonesia) Deria Nur Haliza (China) Zhang Yukun
September 28	Pula, Italy; Clay $10,000; Singles and doubles draws	(Italy) Martina Trevisan; 7–5, 3–6, 6–1	(Italy) Anastasia Grymalska	(Italy) Martina Di Giuseppe (Italy) Camilla Rosatello	(France) Jade Suvrijn (Italy) Bianca Turati (Italy) Stefania Rubini (Italy) Martina Spigarelli
September 28	Pula, Italy; Clay $10,000; Singles and doubles draws	(Italy) Alice Balducci (Italy) Martina Di Giuseppe; Walkover	(Italy) Corinna Dentoni (Italy) Anastasia Grymalska	(Italy) Martina Di Giuseppe (Italy) Camilla Rosatello	(France) Jade Suvrijn (Italy) Bianca Turati (Italy) Stefania Rubini (Italy) Martina Spigarelli
September 28	La Vall d'Uixó, Spain; Clay $10,000; Singles and doubles draws	(Spain) Estrella Cabeza Candela; 7–6^{(7–5)}, 6–2	(Ukraine) Oleksandra Korashvili	(Venezuela) Andrea Gámiz (United Kingdom) Isabelle Wallace	(France) Amandine Cazeaux (Spain) Irene Burillo Escorihuela (Italy) Alice Savoretti (United Kingdom) Amanda Carreras
September 28	La Vall d'Uixó, Spain; Clay $10,000; Singles and doubles draws	(United Kingdom) Amanda Carreras (Italy) Alice Savoretti; 6–1, 6–2	(Spain) María Cañero Pérez (Spain) María Gutiérrez Carrasco	(Venezuela) Andrea Gámiz (United Kingdom) Isabelle Wallace	(France) Amandine Cazeaux (Spain) Irene Burillo Escorihuela (Italy) Alice Savoretti (United Kingdom) Amanda Carreras
September 28	Port El Kantaoui, Tunisia; Hard $10,000; Singles and doubles draws	(Greece) Valentini Grammatikopoulou; 2–6, 6–2, 6–3	(France) Caroline Roméo	(Russia) Yana Sizikova (Bosnia and Herzegovina) Jelena Simić	(Tunisia) Chiraz Bechri (Portugal) Inês Murta (Belarus) Sadafmoh Tolibova (Serbia) Bojana Marinković
September 28	Port El Kantaoui, Tunisia; Hard $10,000; Singles and doubles draws	(Greece) Valentini Grammatikopoulou (Bosnia and Herzegovina) Jelena Simić; 4–6, 6–4, [10–6]	(Sweden) Anette Munozova (Russia) Yana Sizikova	(Russia) Yana Sizikova (Bosnia and Herzegovina) Jelena Simić	(Tunisia) Chiraz Bechri (Portugal) Inês Murta (Belarus) Sadafmoh Tolibova (Serbia) Bojana Marinković
September 28	Antalya, Turkey; Hard $10,000; Singles and doubles draws	(Belarus) Aryna Sabalenka; 6–3, 7–5	(Romania) Daiana Negreanu	(Slovakia) Vivien Juhászová (Bulgaria) Julia Stamatova	(Slovenia) Nastja Kolar (Croatia) Ena Kajević (South Africa) Ilze Hattingh (Denmark) Emilie Francati
September 28	Antalya, Turkey; Hard $10,000; Singles and doubles draws	(Slovakia) Vivien Juhászová (Belarus) Aryna Sabalenka; 6–1, 6–3	(Turkey) Ayla Aksu (Bosnia and Herzegovina) Anita Husarić	(Slovakia) Vivien Juhászová (Bulgaria) Julia Stamatova	(Slovenia) Nastja Kolar (Croatia) Ena Kajević (South Africa) Ilze Hattingh (Denmark) Emilie Francati
September 28	Charleston, United States; Clay $10,000; Singles and doubles draws	Singles competition not completed due to flash flooding in the area	(United States) Caroline Price	(Australia) Samantha Harris (Norway) Ulrikke Eikeri (Slovakia) Martina Frantová	(Portugal) Joana Vale Costa (New Zealand) Jade Lewis (France) Elixane Lechemia (United States) Francesca Di Lorenzo
September 28	Charleston, United States; Clay $10,000; Singles and doubles draws	Doubles competition not completed due to flash flooding in the area		(Australia) Samantha Harris (Norway) Ulrikke Eikeri (Slovakia) Martina Frantová	(Portugal) Joana Vale Costa (New Zealand) Jade Lewis (France) Elixane Lechemia (United States) Francesca Di Lorenzo
