= 2020 ITF Women's World Tennis Tour =

Details
- Duration: 6 January 2020 – 3 January 2021
- Edition: 27th
- Tournaments: 156
- Categories: W100 tournaments (5); W80 tournaments (3); W60 tournaments (5); W25 tournaments (47); W15 tournaments (96)

Achievements (singles)
- Most titles: (Brazil) Beatriz Haddad Maia (China) Zheng Qinwen (4)
- Most finals: (Belarus) Yuliya Hatouka (Romania) Andreea Roșca (6)

The 2020 International Tennis Federation (ITF) Women's World Tennis Tour is a second-tier tour for women's professional tennis. It is organized by the International Tennis Federation and is a tier below the Women's Tennis Association (WTA) Tour. The ITF Women's World Tennis Tour includes tournaments with prize money ranging from $15,000 to $100,000. The ITF Women's World Tennis Tour is the product of reforms designed to support talented junior players in their progression to the senior game, and target the prize money effectively at professional tournaments to enable more players to make a living.

The ITF Women's World Tennis Tour was suspended between 13 March to 16 August due to the coronavirus pandemic.

Due to the pandemic, only 156 tournaments were held in the 2020 season, 398 tournaments less than in 2019.

== Schedule ==
=== April–June ===
No tournaments held due to the coronavirus pandemic

== Participating host nations ==
- Australia (AUS)
- Belarus (BLR)
- Brazil (BRA)
- Bulgaria (BUL)
- Croatia (CRO)
- Czech Republic (CZE)
- Egypt (EGY)
- Estonia (EST)
- France (FRA)
- Germany (GER)
- Great Britain (GBR)
- Greece (GRE)
- Hong Kong (HKG)
- India (IND)
- Italy (ITA)
- Japan (JPN)
- Latvia (LAT)
- Mexico (MEX)
- Netherlands (NED)
- New Zealand (NZL)
- Portugal (POR)
- Russia (RUS)
- Slovakia (SVK)
- Slovenia (SLO)
- South Africa (RSA)
- Spain (ESP)
- Thailand (THA)
- Tunisia (TUN)
- Turkey (TUR)
- United Arab Emirates (UAE)
- United States (USA)

== Tournament breakdown by event category ==
Event category	Number of events	Total prize money
W100	5	$500,000
W80	3	$240,000
W60	5	$300,000
W25	47	$1,175,000
W15	96	$1,440,000
Total	156	$3,655,000

== Ranking points distribution ==
Category	W	F	SF	QF	R16	R32	Q	Q2	Q1
↓ WTA ranking Points ↓
W100+H (S)	150	90	55	28	14	1	6	4	–
W100+H (D)	150	90	55	28	1	–	–	–	–
W100 (S)	140	85	50	25	13	1	6	4	–
W100 (D)	140	85	50	25	1	–	–	–	–
W80+H (S)	130	80	48	24	12	1	5	3	–
W80+H (D)	130	80	48	24	1	–	–	–	–
W80 (S)	115	70	42	21	10	1	5	3	–
W80 (D)	115	70	42	21	1	–	–	–	–
W60+H (S)	100	60	36	18	9	1	5	3	–
W60+H (D)	100	60	36	18	1	–	–	–	–
W60 (S)	80	48	29	15	8	1	5	3	–
W60 (D)	80	48	29	15	1	–	–	–	–
W25+H (S)	60	36	22	11	6	1	2	–	–
W25+H (D)	60	36	22	11	1	–	–	–	–
W25 (S)	50	30	18	9	5	1	1	–	–
W25 (D)	50	30	18	9	1	–	–	–	–
W15+H (S) / W15 (S)	10	6	4	2	1	–	–	–	–
W15+H (D) / W15 (D)	10	6	4	1	–	–	–	–	–
↓ ITF World Tennis Ranking Points ↓
W25+H (S)	–	–	–	–	–	–	4	1	–
W25 (S)	–	–	–	–	–	–	3	1	–
W15+H (S)	–	–	–	–	–	–	3	1	–
W15 (S)	–	–	–	–	–	–	2	1	–

- "+H" indicates that hospitality is provided.

== Prize money distribution ==
Category	W	F	SF	QF	R16	R32	FQR (24/48Q)	FQR (32Q)	Q1 (24Q); Q2 (48Q)	Q1 (32Q)
W100+H (S) / W100 (S)	$15,239	$8,147	$4,473	$2,573	$1,559	$926	$509	$381.75	$316	$237
W100+H (D) / W100 (D)	$5,573	$2,787	$1,393	$760	$507	–	–	–	–	–
W80+H (S) / W80 (S)	$12,192	$6,518	$3,580	$2,059	$1,248	$740	$407	$305.25	$253	$189.75
W80+H (D) / W80 (D)	$4,460	$2,230	$1,115	$608	$405	–	–	–	–	–
W60+H (S) / W60 (S)	$9,142	$4,886	$2,683	$1,543	$935	$557	$305	$228.75	$189	$141.75
W60+H (D) / W60 (D)	$3,344	$1,672	$836	$456	$304	–	–	–	–	–
W25+H (S) / W25 (S)	$3,935	$2,107	$1,162	$672	$408	$244	$126	$96.50	$68	$50
W25+H (D) / W25 (D)	$1,437	$719	$359	$196	$131	–	–	–	–	–
W15+H (S) / W15 (S)	$2,352	$1,470	$734	$367	$294	$147	–	–	–	–
W15+H (D) / W15 (D)	$955	$515	$294	$147	$74	–	–	–	–	–

- Doubles prize money per team

== Statistics ==
=== Key ===
Category
W100 tournaments
W80 tournaments
W60 tournaments
W25 tournaments
W15 tournaments

These tables present the number of singles (S) and doubles (D) titles won by each player and each nation during the season. The players/nations are sorted by:

1. Total number of titles (a doubles title won by two players representing the same nation counts as only one win for the nation)
2. A singles > doubles hierarchy
3. Alphabetical order (by family names for players).

To avoid confusion and double counting, these tables should be updated only after all events of the week are completed.

=== Titles won by player ===
2020 Titles won by player

Total	Player	W100		W80		W60		W25		W15		Total	
Total	Player	S	D	S	D	S	D	S	D	S	D	S	D
8	Andreea Roșca (ROU)									3	5	3	5
6	Yuliya Hatouka (BLR)									3	3	3	3
6	Ioana Loredana Roșca (ROU)								1	1	4	1	5
5	Beatriz Haddad Maia (BRA)							1	1	3		4	1
5	Ankita Raina (IND)		1					2	2			2	3
5	Anna Sisková (CZE)									2	3	2	3
5	Yvonne Cavallé Reimers (ESP)									1	4	1	4
4	Zheng Qinwen (CHN)							3		1		4	0
4	Federica Di Sarra (ITA)							1		2	1	3	1
4	María Lourdes Carlé (ARG)									3	1	3	1
4	Carole Monnet (FRA)									3	1	3	1
4	Ingrid Gamarra Martins (BRA)								1	2	1	2	2
4	Carolina Meligeni Alves (BRA)									2	2	2	2
4	Kimberley Zimmermann (BEL)								3		1	0	4
4	Tereza Mihalíková (SVK)								2		2	0	4
4	Andreea Prisăcariu (ROU)										4	0	4
3	Nadia Podoroska (ARG)					1		2				3	0
3	Kaia Kanepi (EST)							3				3	0
3	Mayar Sherif (EGY)	1						1	1			2	1
3	Sina Herrmann (GER)							1		1	1	2	1
3	Nefisa Berberović (BIH)									2	1	2	1
3	Sandra Samir (EGY)									2	1	2	1
3	Shalimar Talbi (BLR)									2	1	2	1
3	Magdalena Fręch (POL)		1		1			1				1	2
3	Samantha Murray Sharan (GBR)				1			1	1			1	2
3	Jaqueline Cristian (ROU)						1	1	1			1	2
3	Audrey Albié (FRA)								1	1	1	1	2
3	Lara Salden (BEL)								1	1	1	1	2
3	Gozal Ainitdinova (KAZ)									1	2	1	2
3	Andrea Gámiz (VEN)									1	2	1	2
3	Dalila Spiteri (ITA)									1	2	1	2
3	Marine Partaud (FRA)								1		2	0	3
3	Oksana Selekhmeteva (RUS)								1		2	0	3
3	Chantal Škamlová (SVK)								1		2	0	3
3	Mylène Halemai (FRA)										3	0	3
3	Weronika Falkowska (POL)										3	0	3
3	Ángela Fita Boluda (ESP)										3	0	3
3	Zhibek Kulambayeva (KAZ)										3	0	3
3	Suzan Lamens (NED)										3	0	3
3	Daria Mishina (RUS)										3	0	3
3	Nina Stadler (SUI)										3	0	3
3	Anastasia Tikhonova (RUS)										3	0	3
2	Maddison Inglis (AUS)					1		1				2	0
2	Océane Dodin (FRA)							2				2	0
2	Georgina García Pérez (ESP)							2				2	0
2	Clara Tauson (DEN)							1		1		2	0
2	Erika Andreeva (RUS)									2		2	0
2	Cindy Burger (NED)									2		2	0
2	Joanna Garland (TPE)									2		2	0
2	Nina Potočnik (SLO)									2		2	0
2	Marta Kostyuk (UKR)					1	1					1	1
2	Marie Benoît (BEL)							1	1			1	1
2	Sofya Lansere (RUS)							1	1			1	1
2	Robin Montgomery (USA)							1	1			1	1
2	Alycia Parks (USA)							1	1			1	1
2	Anastasia Zakharova (RUS)							1	1			1	1
2	Yuriko Lily Miyazaki (JPN)							1			1	1	1
2	Rutuja Bhosale (IND)								1	1		1	1
2	Alexandra Cadanțu (ROU)								1	1		1	1
2	Miriam Kolodziejová (CZE)								1	1		1	1
2	Darya Astakhova (RUS)									1	1	1	1
2	Susan Bandecchi (SUI)									1	1	1	1
2	Georgia Crăciun (ROU)									1	1	1	1
2	Diane Parry (FRA)									1	1	1	1
2	Iryna Shymanovich (BLR)									1	1	1	1
2	Martina Spigarelli (ITA)									1	1	1	1
2	Lucie Wargnier (FRA)									1	1	1	1
2	Katarzyna Kawa (POL)		1		1							0	2
2	Katarzyna Piter (POL)		1				1					0	2
2	Kamilla Rakhimova (RUS)						1		1			0	2
2	Elena-Gabriela Ruse (ROU)						1		1			0	2
2	Alison Bai (AUS)								2			0	2
2	Anna Bondár (HUN)								2			0	2
2	Anastasia Dețiuc (CZE)								2			0	2
2	Jaimee Fourlis (AUS)								2			0	2
2	Johana Marková (CZE)								2			0	2
2	Kanako Morisaki (JPN)								2			0	2
2	Laura Ioana Paar (ROU)								2			0	2
2	Laura Pigossi (BRA)								2			0	2
2	Bibiane Schoofs (NED)								2			0	2
2	Erika Sema (JPN)								2			0	2
2	Fanny Stollár (HUN)								2			0	2
2	Rosalie van der Hoek (NED)								2			0	2
2	Marina Bassols Ribera (ESP)								1		1	0	2
2	Alina Charaeva (RUS)								1		1	0	2
2	Elina Avanesyan (RUS)										2	0	2
2	Martina Colmegna (ITA)										2	0	2
2	Tamara Čurović (SRB)										2	0	2
2	Oana Gavrilă (ROU)										2	0	2
2	Arianne Hartono (NED)										2	0	2
2	Anna Kubareva (BLR)										2	0	2
2	Ksenia Laskutova (RUS)										2	0	2
2	Yuliana Lizarazo (COL)										2	0	2
2	Ma Yexin (CHN)										2	0	2
2	Verena Meliss (ITA)										2	0	2
2	Justina Mikulskytė (LTU)										2	0	2
2	Thaísa Pedretti (BRA)										2	0	2
2	Laetitia Pulchartová (CZE)										2	0	2
2	Hélène Scholsen (BEL)										2	0	2
2	Darja Semenistaja (LAT)										2	0	2
2	Lexie Stevens (NED)										2	0	2
2	Eliessa Vanlangendonck (BEL)										2	0	2
2	Eva Vedder (NED)										2	0	2
2	Aurora Zantedeschi (ITA)										2	0	2
1	Irina-Camelia Begu (ROU)	1										1	0
1	Sorana Cîrstea (ROU)	1										1	0
1	Olga Govortsova (BLR)	1										1	0
1	Shelby Rogers (USA)	1										1	0
1	Catherine Bellis (USA)			1								1	0
1	Ann Li (USA)			1								1	0
1	Sara Sorribes Tormo (ESP)			1								1	0
1	Ysaline Bonaventure (BEL)					1						1	0
1	Xun Fangying (CHN)					1						1	0
1	Shiho Akita (JPN)							1				1	0
1	Clara Burel (FRA)							1				1	0
1	Jana Čepelová (SVK)							1				1	0
1	Irina Fetecău (ROU)							1				1	0
1	Ekaterina Kazionova (RUS)							1				1	0
1	Anastasiya Komardina (RUS)							1				1	0
1	Ana Konjuh (CRO)							1				1	0
1	Eva Lys (GER)							1				1	0
1	Grace Min (USA)							1				1	0
1	Asia Muhammad (USA)							1				1	0
1	Daniela Seguel (CHI)							1				1	0
1	Viktoriya Tomova (BUL)							1				1	0
1	You Xiaodi (CHN)							1				1	0
1	Marianna Zakarlyuk (UKR)							1				1	0
1	Amina Anshba (RUS)									1		1	0
1	Kamilla Bartone (LAT)									1		1	0
1	Lea Bošković (CRO)									1		1	0
1	Živa Falkner (SLO)									1		1	0
1	Ilona Ghioroaie (ROU)									1		1	0
1	Malene Helgø (NOR)									1		1	0
1	Caijsa Hennemann (SWE)									1		1	0
1	Mina Hodzic (GER)									1		1	0
1	Romy Kölzer (GER)									1		1	0
1	Eléonora Molinaro (LUX)									1		1	0
1	Victoria Muntean (FRA)									1		1	0
1	Matilda Mutavdzic (GBR)									1		1	0
1	Alexa Noel (USA)									1		1	0
1	Valeriya Olyanovskaya (RUS)									1		1	0
1	İpek Öz (TUR)									1		1	0
1	Nuria Párrizas Díaz (ESP)									1		1	0
1	Conny Perrin (SUI)									1		1	0
1	Ganna Poznikhirenko (UKR)									1		1	0
1	Sebastianna Scilipoti (SUI)									1		1	0
1	Sofia Sewing (USA)									1		1	0
1	Sabina Sharipova (UZB)									1		1	0
1	Eri Shimizu (JPN)									1		1	0
1	Zeynep Sönmez (TUR)									1		1	0
1	Julyette Steur (GER)									1		1	0
1	Lulu Sun (SUI)									1		1	0
1	Julia Terziyska (BUL)									1		1	0
1	Maria Timofeeva (RUS)									1		1	0
1	Elza Tomase (LAT)									1		1	0
1	Gergana Topalova (BUL)									1		1	0
1	Anastasia Zolotareva (RUS)									1		1	0
1	Caroline Dolehide (USA)		1									0	1
1	Quinn Gleason (USA)		1									0	1
1	Ekaterine Gorgodze (GEO)		1									0	1
1	Catherine Harrison (USA)		1									0	1
1	Aleksandra Krunić (SRB)		1									0	1
1	Maria Sanchez (USA)		1									0	1
1	Julia Wachaczyk (GER)				1							0	1
1	Allura Zamarripa (USA)				1							0	1
1	Maribella Zamarripa (USA)				1							0	1
1	Erina Hayashi (JPN)						1					0	1
1	Paula Kania-Choduń (POL)						1					0	1
1	Ellen Perez (AUS)						1					0	1
1	Storm Sanders (AUS)						1					0	1
1	Moyuka Uchijima (JPN)						1					0	1
1	Robin Anderson (USA)								1			0	1
1	Mana Ayukawa (JPN)								1			0	1
1	Alicia Barnett (GBR)								1			0	1
1	Eudice Chong (HKG)								1			0	1
1	Kayla Day (USA)								1			0	1
1	Dalma Gálfi (HUN)								1			0	1
1	Myrtille Georges (FRA)								1			0	1
1	Lorraine Guillermo (USA)								1			0	1
1	Amandine Hesse (FRA)								1			0	1
1	Hsu Chieh-yu (TPE)								1			0	1
1	Miyabi Inoue (JPN)								1			0	1
1	Réka Luca Jani (HUN)								1			0	1
1	Séléna Janicijevic (FRA)								1			0	1
1	Robu Kajitani (JPN)								1			0	1
1	Elixane Lechemia (FRA)								1			0	1
1	Jamie Loeb (USA)								1			0	1
1	Maegan Manasse (USA)								1			0	1
1	Rasheeda McAdoo (USA)								1			0	1
1	Andreea Mitu (ROU)								1			0	1
1	Abbie Myers (AUS)								1			0	1
1	Olivia Nicholls (GBR)								1			0	1
1	Silvia Njirić (CRO)								1			0	1
1	Matilde Paoletti (ITA)								1			0	1
1	Lisa Pigato (ITA)								1			0	1
1	Jessika Ponchet (FRA)								1			0	1
1	Dejana Radanović (SRB)								1			0	1
1	Ana Sofía Sánchez (MEX)								1			0	1
1	Naho Sato (JPN)								1			0	1
1	Tereza Smitková (CZE)								1			0	1
1	Panna Udvardy (HUN)								1			0	1
1	Sophia Whittle (USA)								1			0	1
1	Ekaterina Yashina (RUS)								1			0	1
1	Michaela Bayerlová (CZE)										1	0	1
1	Julie Belgraver (FRA)										1	0	1
1	Hurricane Tyra Black (USA)										1	0	1
1	Nuria Brancaccio (ITA)										1	0	1
1	Jodie Burrage (GBR)										1	0	1
1	Jacqueline Cabaj Awad (SWE)										1	0	1
1	Tina Cvetkovič (SLO)										1	0	1
1	Viktoriia Dema (UKR)										1	0	1
1	Zeel Desai (IND)										1	0	1
1	Cristina Dinu (ROU)										1	0	1
1	Aubane Droguet (FRA)										1	0	1
1	Dia Evtimova (BUL)										1	0	1
1	Emily Fanning (NZL)										1	0	1
1	Alena Fomina (RUS)										1	0	1
1	Nicole Fossa Huergo (ITA)										1	0	1
1	Bárbara Gatica (CHI)										1	0	1
1	Eva Guerrero Álvarez (ESP)										1	0	1
1	Han Jiangxue (CHN)										1	0	1
1	Anita Husarić (BIH)										1	0	1
1	Inès Ibbou (ALG)										1	0	1
1	Francisca Jorge (POR)										1	0	1
1	Zoziya Kardava (GEO)										1	0	1
1	Julia Kimmelmann (GER)										1	0	1
1	Martyna Kubka (POL)										1	0	1
1	Manon Léonard (FRA)										1	0	1
1	Pia Lovrič (SLO)										1	0	1
1	Yasmine Mansouri (FRA)										1	0	1
1	Bojana Marinković (SRB)										1	0	1
1	Elena Milovanović (SRB)										1	0	1
1	Angelica Moratelli (ITA)										1	0	1
1	Guillermina Naya (ARG)										1	0	1
1	Svenja Ochsner (SUI)										1	0	1
1	Ayaka Okuno (JPN)										1	0	1
1	Oleksandra Oliynykova (CRO)										1	0	1
1	Fanny Östlund (SWE)										1	0	1
1	Olga Parres Azcoitia (ESP)										1	0	1
1	Katyarina Paulenka (BLR)										1	0	1
1	Veronika Pepelyaeva (RUS)										1	0	1
1	Rebeca Pereira (BRA)										1	0	1
1	Tatiana Pieri (ITA)										1	0	1
1	Lisa Ponomar (GER)										1	0	1
1	Anastasia Pribylova (RUS)										1	0	1
1	Federica Rossi (ITA)										1	0	1
1	Erin Routliffe (NZL)										1	0	1
1	Alica Rusová (SVK)										1	0	1
1	Noel Saidenova (RUS)										1	0	1
1	Sapfo Sakellaridi (GRE)										1	0	1
1	Ekaterina Shalimova (RUS)										1	0	1
1	Sofia Shapatava (GEO)										1	0	1
1	Oana Georgeta Simion (ROU)										1	0	1
1	Valeriya Strakhova (UKR)										1	0	1
1	Lian Tran (NED)										1	0	1
1	Stéphanie Visscher (NED)										1	0	1
1	Margot Yerolymos (FRA)										1	0	1

=== Titles won by nation ===
2020 Titles won by nation

Total	Nation	W100		W80		W60		W25		W15		Total	
Total	Nation	S	D	S	D	S	D	S	D	S	D	S	D
28	Russia (RUS)						1	4	3	7	13	11	17
27	Romania (ROU)	2					1	2	5	7	10	11	16
25	France (FRA)							3	5	7	10	10	15
19	United States (USA)	1	2	2	1			4	6	2	1	9	10
16	Brazil (BRA)							1	3	7	5	8	8
16	Italy (ITA)							1	1	4	10	5	11
15	Netherlands (NED)								4	2	9	2	13
14	Belarus (BLR)	1								6	7	7	7
14	Spain (ESP)			1				2	1	3	7	6	8
13	Belgium (BEL)					1		1	4	1	6	3	10
12	Czech Republic (CZE)								4	3	5	3	9
11	Japan (JPN)						1	2	5	1	2	3	8
10	Germany (GER)				1			2		4	3	6	4
9	China (CHN)					1		4		1	3	6	3
9	Switzerland (SUI)									4	5	4	5
9	Poland (POL)		2		1		1	1			4	1	8
9	Slovakia (SVK)							1	3		5	1	8
8	Argentina (ARG)					1		2		3	2	6	2
8	India (IND)		1					2	3	1	1	3	5
6	Egypt (EGY)	1						1	1	2	1	4	2
6	Ukraine (UKR)					1	1	1		1	2	3	3
6	Great Britain (GBR)				1			1	2	1	1	2	4
6	Australia (AUS)					1	1	1	3			2	4
6	Hungary (HUN)								6			0	6
5	Kazakhstan (KAZ)									1	4	1	4
5	Serbia (SRB)		1						1		3	0	5
4	Bulgaria (BUL)							1		2	1	3	1
4	Slovenia (SLO)									3	1	3	1
4	Croatia (CRO)							1	1	1	1	2	2
4	Latvia (LAT)									2	2	2	2
3	Estonia (EST)							3				3	0
3	Chinese Taipei (TPE)								1	2		2	1
3	Bosnia and Herzegovina (BIH)									2	1	2	1
3	Sweden (SWE)									1	2	1	2
3	Venezuela (VEN)									1	2	1	2
3	Georgia (GEO)		1								2	0	3
2	Denmark (DEN)							1		1		2	0
2	Turkey (TUR)									2		2	0
2	Chile (CHI)							1			1	1	1
2	Colombia (COL)										2	0	2
2	Lithuania (LTU)										2	0	2
1	Luxembourg (LUX)									1		1	0
1	Norway (NOR)									1		1	0
1	Uzbekistan (UZB)									1		1	0
1	Hong Kong (HKG)								1			0	1
1	Mexico (MEX)								1			0	1
1	Algeria (ALG)										1	0	1
1	Greece (GRE)										1	0	1
1	New Zealand (NZL)										1	0	1
1	Portugal (POR)										1	0	1

== Retirements ==
Following is a list of notable players who announced their retirement from professional tennis, became inactive (after not playing for more than 52 weeks), or were permanently banned from playing, during the 2020 season:

- (Italy) Claudia Coppola
- (France) Myrtille Georges
- (Bulgaria) Aleksandrina Naydenova (lifetime ban for match-fixing)
- (France) Constance Sibille
- (Hong Kong) Zhang Ling

== See also ==
- 2020 WTA Tour
- 2020 WTA 125K series
- 2020 ATP Challenger Tour
- 2020 ITF Men's World Tennis Tour
