= 2023 TCCB Open =

Tennis tournament

- Date: 28 August–3 September 2023
- Edition: 3rd
- Category: ITF Women's World Tennis Tour
- Prize money: $60,000
- Surface: Clay / Outdoor
- Location: Collonge-Bellerive, Switzerland

Champions

Singles
- (France) Chloé Paquet

Doubles
- (Switzerland) Conny Perrin / (Czech Republic) Anna Sisková
← 2022 ·	TCCB Open	· 2024 →

The 2023 TCCB Open is a professional tennis tournament played on outdoor clay courts. It is the third edition of the tournament which was part of the 2023 ITF Women's World Tennis Tour. It took place in Collonge-Bellerive, Switzerland between 28 August and 3 September 2023.

== Champions ==
=== Singles ===
- (France) Chloé Paquet def. (Italy) Lucrezia Stefanini, 6–2, 6–1

=== Doubles ===
- (Switzerland) Conny Perrin / (Czech Republic) Anna Sisková def. (France) Estelle Cascino / (Latvia) Diāna Marcinkēviča, 7–6^{(7–4)}, 6–1

== Singles main draw entrants ==
=== Seeds ===
Country	Player	Rank^{1}	Seed
ITA	Lucrezia Stefanini	103	1
ESP	Nuria Párrizas Díaz	127	2
SUI	Ylena In-Albon	158	3
	Polina Kudermetova	172	4
AUT	Sinja Kraus	208	5
FRA	Chloé Paquet	209	6
TUR	İpek Öz	218	7
SRB	Lola Radivojević	254	8

- ^{1} Rankings are as of 21 August 2023.

=== Other entrants ===
The following players received wildcards into the singles main draw:

- (Switzerland) Karolina Kozakova
- (Switzerland) Alina Granwehr
- (Switzerland) Leonie Küng
- (Switzerland) Sebastianna Scilipoti

The following players received entry into the singles main draw as a special exempt:

- (Turkey) Ayla Aksu

The following players received entry from the qualifying draw:

- (France) Loïs Boisson
- (Argentina) Berta Bonardi
- (Switzerland) Fiona Ganz
- (France) Amandine Hesse
- (Sweden) Fanny Östlund
- (Italy) Jessica Pieri
- (France) Emmanuelle Salas
- (Australia) Tina Nadine Smith
