= 2023 TCCB Open – Doubles =

Doubles
- 2023 TCCB Open

Final
- Champions: (Switzerland) Conny Perrin (Czech Republic) Anna Sisková
- Runners-up: (France) Estelle Cascino (Latvia) Diāna Marcinkēviča
- Score: 7–6^{(7–4)}, 6–1

Events
Singles	Doubles
← 2022 ·	TCCB Open	· 2024 →

Jenny Dürst and Weronika Falkowska were the defending champions but Falkowska chose not to participate. Dürst partnered alongside Fanny Östlund, but lost to Conny Perrin and Anna Sisková in the semifinals.

Perrin and Sisková won the title, defeating Estelle Cascino and Diāna Marcinkēviča in the final, 7–6^{(7–4)}, 6–1.

== Seeds ==
1. Alena Fomina-Klotz / (Germany) Julia Lohoff (quarterfinals)
2. (Switzerland) Conny Perrin / (Czech Republic) Anna Sisková (champions)
3. (France) Estelle Cascino / (Latvia) Diāna Marcinkēviča (final)
4. (Switzerland) Jenny Dürst / (Sweden) Fanny Östlund (semifinals)

== Draw ==
=== Key ===
- Q = Qualifier
- WC = Wild card
- LL = Lucky loser
- Alt = Alternate
- SE = Special exempt
- PR = Protected ranking
- ITF = ITF entry
- JE = Junior exempt
- w/o = Walkover
- r = Retired
- d = Defaulted
- SR = Special ranking

First round
1	A Fomina-Klotz (Germany) J Lohoff	w/o
(Switzerland) S Marti (Switzerland) A Rushiti
(Switzerland) Y In-Albon (France) C Paquet	2	3
(Czech Republic) M Bayerlová (Australia) K McPhee	6	6
3	(France) E Cascino (Latvia) D Marcinkēviča	6	6
(Switzerland) A Granwehr (Switzerland) V Ryser	2	2
(Algeria) I Ibbou (Switzerland) N Karamoko	2	0^{r}
(Argentina) B Bonardi (Australia) TN Smith	6	0
(Serbia) L Radivojević (Hungary) N Szabanin	w/o
(Sweden) J Cabaj Awad (Turkey) İ Öz
(Switzerland) F Ganz (Switzerland) S Lüscher	5	0
4	(Switzerland) J Dürst (Sweden) F Östlund	7	6
(Bulgaria) D Evtimova (France) Y Mansouri	6	3	[9]
(Switzerland) K Kozakova (Japan) C Mushika	2	6	[11]
(Switzerland) M Mettraux (Switzerland) S Scilipoti	2	2
2	(Switzerland) C Perrin (Czech Republic) A Sisková	6	6

Quarterfinals
1	A Fomina-Klotz (Germany) J Lohoff	4	3
(Czech Republic) M Bayerlová (Australia) K McPhee	6	6
3	(France) E Cascino (Latvia) D Marcinkēviča	7^{7}	6
(Argentina) B Bonardi (Australia) TN Smith	6^{5}	4
(Serbia) L Radivojević (Hungary) N Szabanin	1	4
4	(Switzerland) J Dürst (Sweden) F Östlund	6	6
(Switzerland) K Kozakova (Japan) C Mushika	2	3
2	(Switzerland) C Perrin (Czech Republic) A Sisková	6	6

Semifinals
(Czech Republic) M Bayerlová (Australia) K McPhee	5	6	[7]
3	(France) E Cascino (Latvia) D Marcinkēviča	7	3	[10]
4	(Switzerland) J Dürst (Sweden) F Östlund	6	3	[2]
2	(Switzerland) C Perrin (Czech Republic) A Sisková	3	6	[10]

Final
3	(France) E Cascino (Latvia) D Marcinkēviča	6^{4}	1
2	(Switzerland) C Perrin (Czech Republic) A Sisková	7^{7}	6
