= 2021 TCCB Open =

Tennis tournament

- Date: 30 August–5 September 2021
- Edition: 1st
- Category: ITF Women's World Tennis Tour
- Prize money: $60,000
- Surface: Clay
- Location: Collonge-Bellerive, Switzerland

Champions

Singles
- (Brazil) Beatriz Haddad Maia

Doubles
- (Russia) Amina Anshba / (Russia) Anastasia Gasanova
TCCB Open	· 2022 →

The 2021 TCCB Open was a professional women's tennis tournament played on outdoor clay courts. It was the first edition of the tournament which was part of the 2021 ITF Women's World Tennis Tour. It took place in Collonge-Bellerive, Switzerland between 30 August and 5 September 2021.

== Singles main-draw entrants ==
=== Seeds ===
Country	Player	Rank^{1}	Seed
FRA	Océane Dodin	102	1
RUS	Anastasia Gasanova	166	2
BRA	Beatriz Haddad Maia	174	3
HUN	Anna Bondár	199	4
NED	Indy de Vroome	203	5
GER	Tatjana Maria	209	6
JPN	Yuki Naito	222	7
FRA	Amandine Hesse	228	8

- ^{1} Rankings are as of 23 August 2021.

=== Other entrants ===
The following players received wildcards into the singles main draw:

- (Switzerland) Alina Granwehr
- (Switzerland) Valentina Ryser
- (Switzerland) Sebastianna Scilipoti
- (Switzerland) Joanne Züger

The following players received entry from the qualifying draw:

- (India) Sowjanya Bavisetti
- (France) Estelle Cascino
- (Switzerland) Jenny Dürst
- (Russia) Alena Fomina-Klotz
- (Japan) Nagi Hanatani
- (Norway) Malene Helgø
- (Switzerland) Sandy Marti
- (Switzerland) Céline Naef

The following player received entry as a lucky loser:

- (Turkey) İpek Öz

== Champions ==
=== Singles ===
- (Brazil) Beatriz Haddad Maia def. (Turkey) İpek Öz, 5–7, 6–1, 6–4

=== Doubles ===
- (Russia) Amina Anshba / (Russia) Anastasia Gasanova def. (France) Amandine Hesse / (Germany) Tatjana Maria, 6–1, 6–7^{(6–8)}, [10–8]
