= 2022 TCCB Open – Doubles =

Doubles
- 2022 TCCB Open

Final
- Champions: (Switzerland) Jenny Dürst (Poland) Weronika Falkowska
- Runners-up: (Czech Republic) Michaela Bayerlová (Sweden) Jacqueline Cabaj Awad
- Score: 7–6^{(7–5)}, 6–1

Events
Singles	Doubles
← 2021 ·	TCCB Open	· 2023 →

Jenny Dürst and Weronika Falkowska won the title, defeating Michaela Bayerlová and Jacqueline Cabaj Awad in the final, 7–6^{(7–5)}, 6–1.

Amina Anshba and Anastasia Gasanova were the defending champions but chose not to participate.

== Seeds ==
1. (France) Estelle Cascino / (Switzerland) Conny Perrin (first round)
2. (United Kingdom) Emily Appleton / (India) Prarthana Thombare (semifinals)
3. (Germany) Katharina Gerlach / (South Korea) Jang Su-jeong (quarterfinals, withdrew)
4. (Japan) Mana Ayukawa / (Hong Kong) Cody Wong Hong-yi (quarterfinals, withdrew)

== Draw ==
=== Key ===
- Q = Qualifier
- WC = Wild card
- LL = Lucky loser
- Alt = Alternate
- SE = Special exempt
- PR = Protected ranking
- ITF = ITF entry
- JE = Junior exempt
- w/o = Walkover
- r = Retired
- d = Defaulted
- SR = Special ranking

=== Draw ===
First round
1	(France) E Cascino (Switzerland) C Perrin	6	4	[7]
M Bondarenko (Italy) D Spiteri	4	6	[10]
WC	(Switzerland) K Kashaeva (Germany) A Klasen	6^{10}	4
WC	(Algeria) I Ibbou (Germany) J Jebawy	7^{12}	6
4	(Japan) M Ayukawa (Hong Kong) C Wong H-y	7	4	[10]
(Turkey) A Aksu (Switzerland) T Sugnaux	5	6	[7]
(Switzerland) Y In-Albon (Switzerland) J Züger	3	4
(Czech Republic) M Bayerlová (Sweden) J Cabaj Awad	6	6
(Japan) E Hayashi (Japan) K Morisaki	6^{6}	2
(Switzerland) J Dürst (Poland) W Falkowska	7^{8}	6
(Spain) Y Cavallé Reimers (Romania) O Gavrilă	4	2
3	(Germany) K Gerlach (South Korea) S-j Jang	6	6
(Switzerland) A Rushiti (Turkey) Z Sönmez	3	5
WC	(India) S Bavisetti (Argentina) B Bonardi	6	7
(Switzerland) N Karamoko (Switzerland) V Ryser	5	4
2	(United Kingdom) E Appleton (India) P Thombare	7	6

Quarterfinals
M Bondarenko (Italy) D Spiteri	6	2	[7]
WC	(Algeria) I Ibbou (Germany) J Jebawy	3	6	[10]
4	(Japan) M Ayukawa (Hong Kong) C Wong H-y
(Czech Republic) M Bayerlová (Sweden) J Cabaj Awad	w/o
(Switzerland) J Dürst (Poland) W Falkowska	w/o
3	(Germany) K Gerlach (South Korea) S-j Jang
WC	(India) S Bavisetti (Argentina) B Bonardi	4	5
2	(United Kingdom) E Appleton (India) P Thombare	6	7

Semifinals
WC	(Algeria) I Ibbou (Germany) J Jebawy	0	4
(Czech Republic) M Bayerlová (Sweden) J Cabaj Awad	6	6
(Switzerland) J Dürst (Poland) W Falkowska	6	0	[10]
2	(United Kingdom) E Appleton (India) P Thombare	2	6	[8]

Final
(Czech Republic) M Bayerlová (Sweden) J Cabaj Awad	6^{5}	1
(Switzerland) J Dürst (Poland) W Falkowska	7^{7}	6
