= 2022 TCCB Open =

Tennis tournament

- Date: 28 August–4 September 2022
- Edition: 2nd
- Category: ITF Women's World Tennis Tour
- Prize money: $60,000
- Surface: Clay / Outdoor
- Location: Collonge-Bellerive, Switzerland

Champions

Singles
- (Italy) Lucrezia Stefanini

Doubles
- (Switzerland) Jenny Dürst / (Poland) Weronika Falkowska
| ← 2021 · | TCCB Open | · 2023 → |

The 2022 TCCB Open was a professional tennis tournament played on outdoor clay courts. It was the second edition of the tournament which was part of the 2022 ITF Women's World Tennis Tour. It took place in Collonge-Bellerive, Switzerland between 28 August and 4 September 2022.

== Champions ==
=== Singles ===
- (Italy) Lucrezia Stefanini def. (Austria) Sinja Kraus, 6–2, 2–1, ret.

=== Doubles ===
- (Switzerland) Jenny Dürst / (Poland) Weronika Falkowska def. (Czech Republic) Michaela Bayerlová / (Sweden) Jacqueline Cabaj Awad, 7–6^{(7–5)}, 6–1

== Singles main draw entrants ==
=== Seeds ===
| Country | Player | Rank^{1} | Seed |
|---|---|---|---|
| KOR | Jang Su-jeong | 120 | 1 |
| SUI | Ylena In-Albon | 133 | 2 |
| SUI | Joanne Züger | 167 | 3 |
| BRA | Carolina Alves | 176 | 4 |
| AUT | Sinja Kraus | 203 | 5 |
| FRA | Séléna Janicijevic | 208 | 6 |
| SUI | Stefanie Vögele | 219 | 7 |
| ITA | Lucrezia Stefanini | 233 | 8 |

- ^{1} Rankings are as of 22 August 2022.

=== Other entrants ===
The following players received wildcards into the singles main draw:

- (Switzerland) Karolina Kozakova
- (Switzerland) Arlinda Rushiti
- (Switzerland) Valentina Ryser
- (Switzerland) Sebastianna Scilipoti

The following player received entry into the singles main draw using a protected ranking:

- (Colombia) Emiliana Arango

The following players received entry into the singles main draw as a special exempt:

- (Italy) Matilde Paoletti
- (Turkey) Zeynep Sönmez

The following players received entry from the qualifying draw:

- (Sweden) Jacqueline Cabaj Awad
- (Bulgaria) Dia Evtimova
- (Romania) Oana Gavrilă
- (Algeria) Inès Ibbou
- (Germany) Anna Klasen
- (Italy) Dalila Spiteri
- (France) Alice Tubello
- (Hong Kong) Cody Wong Hong-yi
