= 2021 TCCB Open – Singles =

Singles
- 2021 TCCB Open

Final
- Champion: (Brazil) Beatriz Haddad Maia
- Runner-up: (Turkey) İpek Öz
- Score: 5–7, 6–1, 6–4

Events
Singles	Doubles
TCCB Open	· 2022 →

This was the first edition of the tournament.

Beatriz Haddad Maia won the tournament, defeating İpek Öz in the final, 5–7, 6–1, 6–4.

== Seeds ==
1. (France) Océane Dodin (second round)
2. (Russia) Anastasia Gasanova (first round)
3. (Brazil) Beatriz Haddad Maia (champion)
4. (Hungary) Anna Bondár (semifinals)
5. (Netherlands) Indy de Vroome (first round)
6. (Germany) Tatjana Maria (second round)
7. (Japan) Yuki Naito (first round, retired)
8. (France) Amandine Hesse (semifinals)

== Draw ==
=== Key ===
- Q = Qualifier
- WC = Wild card
- LL = Lucky loser
- Alt = Alternate
- SE = Special exempt
- PR = Protected ranking
- ITF = ITF entry
- JE = Junior exempt
- w/o = Walkover
- r = Retired
- d = Defaulted
- SR = Special ranking

=== Finals ===
Semifinals
8	(France) Amandine Hesse	1	3
3	(Brazil) Beatriz Haddad Maia	6	6
4	(Hungary) Anna Bondár	5	3
LL	(Turkey) İpek Öz	7	6

Final
3	(Brazil) Beatriz Haddad Maia	5	6	6
LL	(Turkey) İpek Öz	7	1	4

=== Top half ===
First round
1	(France) O Dodin	6	7
WC	(Switzerland) V Ryser	3	5
(Slovenia) D Jakupović	1^{r}
(Burundi) S Nahimana	4
Q	(Norway) M Helgø	6	4	6
(Belgium) L Salden	4	6	3
(Italy) C Rosatello	4	6	2
8	(France) A Hesse	6	1	6
3	(Brazil) B Haddad Maia	6	6
Q	(Japan) N Hanatani	0	1
(Switzerland) S Waltert	6	6
(Russia) A Anshba	2	1
(Latvia) D Marcinkēviča	4	4
Q	(France) E Cascino	6	6
Q	(Switzerland) C Naef	7^{8}	4	4
6	(Germany) T Maria	6^{6}	6	6

Second round
1	(France) O Dodin	0	4
(Burundi) S Nahimana	6	6
Q	(Norway) M Helgø	0	6	5
8	(France) A Hesse	6	3	7
3	(Brazil) B Haddad Maia	6	4	6
(Switzerland) S Waltert	1	6	3
Q	(France) E Cascino	6	7
6	(Germany) T Maria	0	5

Quarterfinals
(Burundi) S Nahimana	3	2
8	(France) A Hesse	6	6
3	(Brazil) B Haddad Maia	6	2	6
Q	(France) E Cascino	1	6	0

Semifinals
8	(France) A Hesse	1	3
3	(Brazil) B Haddad Maia	6	6

=== Bottom half ===
First round
7	(Japan) Y Naito	0^{r}
(Switzerland) C Perrin	3
Q	(Switzerland) S Marti	6	1	6
(United Kingdom) N Bains	1	6	1
WC	(Switzerland) A Granwehr	2	4
(France) E Jacquemot	6	6
Q	(Switzerland) J Dürst	3	0
4	(Hungary) A Bondár	6	6
5	(Netherlands) I de Vroome	3	6	3
WC	(Switzerland) S Scilipoti	6	3	6
Q	(Russia) A Fomina-Klotz	6	1	3
LL	(Turkey) İ Öz	3	6	6
(France) J Ponchet	6	6
Q	(India) S Bavisetti	0	0
WC	(Switzerland) J Züger	6	4	6
2	(Russia) A Gasanova	3	6	1

Second round
(Switzerland) C Perrin	6	6
Q	(Switzerland) S Marti	1	4
(France) E Jacquemot	6^{3}	0
4	(Hungary) A Bondár	7^{7}	6
WC	(Switzerland) S Scilipoti	0	0
LL	(Turkey) İ Öz	6	6
(France) J Ponchet	6	1	2
WC	(Switzerland) J Züger	4	6	6

Quarterfinals
(Switzerland) C Perrin	6^{2}	2
4	(Hungary) A Bondár	7^{7}	6
LL	(Turkey) İ Öz	6	6
WC	(Switzerland) J Züger	3	2

Semifinals
4	(Hungary) A Bondár	5	3
LL	(Turkey) İ Öz	7	6
