= 2026 Zagreb Ladies Open =

Tennis tournament

- Date: 8–14 June 2025
- Edition: 16th
- Category: ITF Women's World Tennis Tour
- Draw: 32S / 16D
- Prize money: $100,000
- Surface: Clay / Outdoor
- Location: Zagreb, Croatia
- Venue: Tenis centar Maksimir

Champions

Singles
- (Armenia) Elina Avanesyan

Doubles
- (Croatia) Lucija Ćirić Bagarić / (Italy) Angelica Moratelli
- Zagreb Ladies Open

The 2026 Zagreb Ladies Open is a professional tennis tournament play on outdoor clay courts. It is the sixteenth edition of the tournament, which was part of the 2026 ITF Women's World Tennis Tour. It is taking place in Zagreb, Croatia, between 8 and 14 June 2026.

== Champions ==
=== Singles ===
- (Armenia) Elina Avanesyan def. (Sweden) Kajsa Rinaldo Persson, 6–1, 6–3.

=== Doubles ===
- (Croatia) Lucija Ćirić Bagarić / (Italy) Angelica Moratelli def. (Bulgaria) Rositsa Dencheva / Ekaterina Kazionova, 7–5, 6–3.

== Singles main draw entrants ==
=== Seeds ===
Country	Player	Rank	Seed
SVK	Rebecca Šramková	125	1
SRB	Teodora Kostović	187	2
MKD	Lina Gjorcheska	198	3
FRA	Alice Ramé	200	4
GER	Anna-Lena Friedsam	213	5
GER	Caroline Werner	221	6
	Erika Andreeva	230	7
SWE	Kajsa Rinaldo Persson	252	8

- Rankings are as of 25 May 2026.

=== Other entrants ===
The following players received wildcards into the singles main draw:

- (Croatia) Ana Konjuh
- (Croatia) Dora Mišković
- (Slovenia) Ela Plošnik
- (Croatia) Iva Primorac Pavičić

The following players received entry from the qualifying draw:

- (Romania) Bianca Bărbulescu
- (Poland) Weronika Falkowska
- (Italy) Laura Mair
- (Slovakia) Eszter Méri
- (Hungary) Adrienn Nagy
- (Turkey) İpek Öz
- (Romania) Briana Szabó
- (Switzerland) Katerina Tsygourova

The following player received entry as a lucky loser:

- (Germany) Gina Marie Dittmann
