= 2022 TCCB Open – Singles =

Singles
- 2022 TCCB Open

Final
- Champion: (Italy) Lucrezia Stefanini
- Runner-up: (Austria) Sinja Kraus
- Score: 6–2, 2–1, ret.

Events
Singles	Doubles
← 2021 ·	TCCB Open	· 2023 →

Lucrezia Stefanini won the title after Sinja Kraus retired in the final at 6–2, 2–1.

Beatriz Haddad Maia was the defending champion but chose to participate at the US Open instead.

== Seeds ==
1. (South Korea) Jang Su-jeong (semifinals)
2. (Switzerland) Ylena In-Albon (second round)
3. (Switzerland) Joanne Züger (quarterfinals)
4. (Brazil) Carolina Alves (quarterfinals)
5. (Austria) Sinja Kraus (final, retired)
6. (France) Séléna Janicijevic (second round)
7. (Switzerland) Stefanie Vögele (first round, defaulted)
8. (Italy) Lucrezia Stefanini (champion)

== Draw ==
=== Key ===
- Q = Qualifier
- WC = Wild card
- LL = Lucky loser
- Alt = Alternate
- SE = Special exempt
- PR = Protected ranking
- ITF = ITF entry
- JE = Junior exempt
- w/o = Walkover
- r = Retired
- d = Defaulted
- SR = Special ranking

=== Finals ===
Semifinals
1	(South Korea) Jang Su-jeong	3	6	6^{5}
5	(Austria) Sinja Kraus	6	4	7^{7}
Q	(Italy) Dalila Spiteri	1	6^{2}
8	(Italy) Lucrezia Stefanini	6	7^{7}

Final
5	(Austria) Sinja Kraus	2	1^{r}
8	(Italy) Lucrezia Stefanini	6	2

=== Top half ===
First round
1	(South Korea) S-j Jang	6	6
SE	(Turkey) Z Sönmez	2	3
Q	(Romania) O Gavrilă	6^{3}	7^{8}	2
Q	(Hong Kong) C Wong H-y	7^{7}	6^{6}	6
(Switzerland) J Dürst	7	7
Q	(Algeria) I Ibbou	5	5
Q	(Germany) A Klasen	4	1
6	(France) S Janicijevic	6	6
4	(Brazil) C Alves	6	6
J Kolodynska	3	0
M Bondarenko	6	6
(Switzerland) C Perrin	4	0
(Spain) Y Cavallé Reimers	6	6
(Czech Republic) M Bayerlová	4	4
WC	(Switzerland) A Rushiti	3	2
5	(Austria) S Kraus	6	6

Second round
1	(South Korea) S-j Jang	6	2
Q	(Hong Kong) C Wong H-y	1	0^{r}
(Switzerland) J Dürst	6	6
6	(France) S Janicijevic	3	3
4	(Brazil) C Alves	4	6	6
M Bondarenko	6	3	4
(Spain) Y Cavallé Reimers	6	3	1
5	(Austria) S Kraus	4	6	6

Quarterfinals
1	(South Korea) S-j Jang	6	6
(Switzerland) J Dürst	3	2
4	(Brazil) C Alves	3	3
5	(Austria) S Kraus	6	6

Semifinals
1	(South Korea) S-j Jang	3	6	6^{5}
5	(Austria) S Kraus	6	4	7^{7}

=== Bottom half ===
First round
7	(Switzerland) S Vögele	6	3	1^{d}
(Poland) W Falkowska	3	6	3
Q	(Bulgaria) D Evtimova	3	3
Q	(Italy) D Spiteri	6	6
(Germany) K Gerlach	4	4
SE	(Italy) M Paoletti	6	6
Q	(Sweden) J Cabaj Awad	2	1
3	(Switzerland) J Züger	6	6
8	(Italy) L Stefanini	6	6
WC	(Switzerland) V Ryser	1	0
PR	(Colombia) E Arango	3	4
(France) A Albié	6	6
WC	(Switzerland) S Scilipoti	1	4
Q	(France) A Tubello	6	6
WC	(Switzerland) K Kozakova	4	1^{r}
2	(Switzerland) Y In-Albon	6	3

Second round
(Poland) W Falkowska	6^{5}	2
Q	(Italy) D Spiteri	7^{7}	6
SE	(Italy) M Paoletti	6	1	3
3	(Switzerland) J Züger	3	6	6
8	(Italy) L Stefanini	6	6
(France) A Albié	4	2
Q	(France) A Tubello	6	6
2	(Switzerland) Y In-Albon	0	3

Quarterfinals
Q	(Italy) D Spiteri	6	6
3	(Switzerland) J Züger	2	3
8	(Italy) L Stefanini	6	6^{2}	6
Q	(France) A Tubello	3	7^{7}	4

Semifinals
Q	(Italy) D Spiteri	1	6^{2}
8	(Italy) L Stefanini	6	7^{7}
