= 2026 Zagreb Ladies Open – Doubles =

Doubles
- 2026 Zagreb Ladies Open

Final
- Champions: (Croatia) Lucija Ćirić Bagarić (Italy) Angelica Moratelli
- Runners-up: (Bulgaria) Rositsa Dencheva; Ekaterina Kazionova
- Score: 7–5, 6–3

Events
Singles	Doubles
- Zagreb Ladies Open

Feng Shuo and Aoi Ito were the defending champions, but Feng chose to compete in Ilkley instead and Ito did not participate this year.

Lucija Ćirić Bagarić and Angelica Moratelli won the title, defeating Rositsa Dencheva and Ekaterina Kazionova 7–5, 6–3 in the final.

== Seeds ==
1. (Australia) Gabriella Da Silva-Fick / (Australia) Tenika McGiffin (first round)
2. (United States) Jaeda Daniel / (India) Prarthana Thombare (first round)
3. (Croatia) Lucija Ćirić Bagarić / (Italy) Angelica Moratelli (champions)
4. (Poland) Weronika Falkowska / (Turkey) İpek Öz (semifinals)

== Draw ==
Key

- Q = Qualifier
- WC = Wild card
- LL = Lucky loser
- Alt = Alternate
- ITF = ITF entry
- PR = Protected ranking
- SR = Special ranking
- SE = Special exempt
- JE = Junior exempt
- JR = Junior Accelerator Programme entrant
- CO = College Accelerator Programme entrant
- NG = Next Gen Accelerator Program entrant
- w/o = Walkover
- r = Retired
- d = Defaulted

=== Draw ===
First round
1	(Australia) G Da Silva-Fick (Australia) T McGiffin	5	4
(Slovenia) D Jakupović (Montenegro) D Kovinić	7	6
(Romania) I Amariei (Romania) B Bărbulescu	6	6
WC	(Slovenia) E Plošnik (Croatia) N Tomeljak	4	0
3	(Croatia) L Ćirić Bagarić (Italy) A Moratelli	6	6
(Slovenia) A Senica (Romania) B Szabó	3	2
WC	(Croatia) L Ivković (Croatia) N Knezevic	0	6^{4}
(Bosnia and Herzegovina) A Wagner (United Kingdom) E Webley-Smith	6	7^{7}
WC	(Croatia) C Jerolimov (Croatia) N Krznarić Uygungul	1	1
(Romania) O Gavrilă (Hungary) A Nagy	6	6
(Italy) E Chiesa (Germany) M Hodzic	4	6	[6]
4	(Poland) W Falkowska (Turkey) İ Öz	6	2	[10]
(Croatia) M Dražić (Croatia) D Mišković	2	7	[10]
(Serbia) M Ristić (Switzerland) K Tsygourova	6	5	[4]
(Bulgaria) R Dencheva; E Kazionova	6^{5}	6	[10]
2	(United States) J Daniel (India) P Thombare	7^{7}	4	[8]

Quarterfinals
(Slovenia) D Jakupović (Montenegro) D Kovinić	6	7
(Romania) I Amariei (Romania) B Bărbulescu	3	5
3	(Croatia) L Ćirić Bagarić (Italy) A Moratelli	7	6
(Bosnia and Herzegovina) A Wagner (United Kingdom) E Webley-Smith	5	4
(Romania) O Gavrilă (Hungary) A Nagy	3	7	[6]
4	(Poland) W Falkowska (Turkey) İ Öz	6	5	[10]
(Croatia) M Dražić (Croatia) D Mišković	4	0
(Bulgaria) R Dencheva; E Kazionova	6	6

Semifinals
(Slovenia) D Jakupović (Montenegro) D Kovinić	4	4
3	(Croatia) L Ćirić Bagarić (Italy) A Moratelli	6	6
4	(Poland) W Falkowska (Turkey) İ Öz	4	3
(Bulgaria) R Dencheva; E Kazionova	6	6

Final
3	(Croatia) L Ćirić Bagarić (Italy) A Moratelli	7	6
(Bulgaria) R Dencheva; E Kazionova	5	3
