= 2026 Zagreb Ladies Open – Singles =

Singles
- 2026 Zagreb Ladies Open

Final
- Champion: (Armenia) Elina Avanesyan
- Runner-up: (Sweden) Kajsa Rinaldo Persson
- Score: 6–1, 6–3

Events
Singles	Doubles
- Zagreb Ladies Open

Dominika Šalková was the defending champion, but chose to compete in Modena instead.

Elina Avanesyan won the title, defeating Kajsa Rinaldo Persson 6–1, 6–3 in the final.

== Seeds ==
1. (Slovakia) Rebecca Šramková (first round)
2. (Serbia) Teodora Kostović (first round)
3. (North Macedonia) Lina Gjorcheska (first round)
4. (France) Alice Ramé (first round)
5. (Germany) Anna-Lena Friedsam (semifinals)
6. (Germany) Caroline Werner (first round)
7. Erika Andreeva (first round)
8. (Sweden) Kajsa Rinaldo Persson (final)

== Draw ==
Key

- Q = Qualifier
- WC = Wild card
- LL = Lucky loser
- Alt = Alternate
- ITF = ITF entry
- PR = Protected ranking
- SR = Special ranking
- SE = Special exempt
- JE = Junior exempt
- JR = Junior Accelerator Programme entrant
- CO = College Accelerator Programme entrant
- NG = Next Gen Accelerator Program entrant
- w/o = Walkover
- r = Retired
- d = Defaulted

=== Finals ===
Semifinals
WC	(Croatia) Iva Primorac Pavičić	6	1	1
(Armenia) Elina Avanesyan	1	6	6
8	(Sweden) Kajsa Rinaldo Persson	4	6	6
5	(Germany) Anna-Lena Friedsam	6	3	2

Final
(Armenia) Elina Avanesyan	6	6
8	(Sweden) Kajsa Rinaldo Persson	1	3

=== Top half ===
First round
1	(Slovakia) R Šramková	3	4
WC	(Croatia) I Primorac Pavičić	6	6
Q	(Romania) B Szabó	3	2
(Bulgaria) R Dencheva	6	6
Q	(Romania) B Bărbulescu	3	1
(Slovenia) D Jakupović	6	6
(Hungary) A Tóth	6	7^{8}
6	(Germany) C Werner	3	6^{6}
3	(North Macedonia) L Gjorcheska	6	5	4
E Kazionova	1	7	6
(Serbia) M Ristić	6	3
(Croatia) T Lukas	4	1^{r}
(Germany) T Brockmann	6^{5}	3
(Armenia) E Avanesyan	7^{7}	6
(Croatia) L Bošković	7	7^{7}
7	E Andreeva	5	6^{2}

Second round
WC	(Croatia) I Primorac Pavičić	7	6
(Bulgaria) R Dencheva	5	2
(Slovenia) D Jakupović	6	3	7
(Hungary) A Tóth	3	6	5
E Kazionova	4	4
(Serbia) M Ristić	6	6
(Armenia) E Avanesyan	7	2	6
(Croatia) L Bošković	5	6	3

Quarterfinals
WC	(Croatia) I Primorac Pavičić	6	7^{7}
(Slovenia) D Jakupović	4	6^{5}
(Serbia) M Ristić	4	4
(Armenia) E Avanesyan	6	6

Semifinals
WC	(Croatia) I Primorac Pavičić	6	1	1
(Armenia) E Avanesyan	1	6	6

=== Bottom half ===
First round
8	(Sweden) K Rinaldo Persson	6	6
Q	(Poland) W Falkowska	3	3
Q	(Hungary) A Nagy	6^{8}	6	4
Q	(Slovakia) E Méri	7^{10}	4	6
(Croatia) L Ćirić Bagarić	6	7^{7}
WC	(Croatia) D Mišković	1	6^{2}
Q	(Italy) L Mair	7^{7}	7^{7}
4	(France) A Ramé	6^{3}	6^{4}
5	(Germany) A-L Friedsam	6	6
WC	(Slovenia) E Plošnik	1	0
Q	(Switzerland) K Tsygourova	2	2
(Germany) M Hodzic	6	6
WC	(Croatia) A Konjuh	5	2
LL	(Germany) GM Dittmann	7	6
Q	(Turkey) İ Öz	7	4	6
2	(Serbia) T Kostović	5	6	3

Second round
8	(Sweden) K Rinaldo Persson	6	6
Q	(Slovakia) E Méri	2	1
(Croatia) L Ćirić Bagarić	3	2
Q	(Italy) L Mair	6	6
5	(Germany) A-L Friedsam	7^{7}	7
(Germany) M Hodzic	6^{4}	5
LL	(Germany) GM Dittmann	2	6	7
Q	(Turkey) İ Öz	6	4	5

Quarterfinals
8	(Sweden) K Rinaldo Persson	6	6
Q	(Italy) L Mair	2	0
5	(Germany) A-L Friedsam	6	7
LL	(Germany) GM Dittmann	2	5

Semifinals
8	(Sweden) K Rinaldo Persson	4	6	6
5	(Germany) A-L Friedsam	6	3	2
