= 2023 TCCB Open – Singles =

Singles
- 2023 TCCB Open

Final
- Champion: (France) Chloé Paquet
- Runner-up: (Italy) Lucrezia Stefanini
- Score: 6–2, 6–1

Events
Singles	Doubles
← 2022 ·	TCCB Open	· 2024 →

Lucrezia Stefanini was the defending champion but lost in the final to Chloé Paquet, 2–6, 1–6.

== Seeds ==
1. (Italy) Lucrezia Stefanini (final)
2. (Spain) Nuria Párrizas Díaz (first round, retired)
3. (Switzerland) Ylena In-Albon (second round)
4. Polina Kudermetova (quarterfinals)
5. (Austria) Sinja Kraus (first round)
6. (France) Chloé Paquet (champion)
7. (Turkey) İpek Öz (semifinals)
8. (Serbia) Lola Radivojević (first round, retired)

== Draw ==
=== Key ===
- Q = Qualifier
- WC = Wild card
- LL = Lucky loser
- Alt = Alternate
- SE = Special exempt
- PR = Protected ranking
- ITF = ITF entry
- JE = Junior exempt
- w/o = Walkover
- r = Retired
- d = Defaulted
- SR = Special ranking

=== Finals ===
Semifinals
1	(Italy) Lucrezia Stefanini	7^{7}	7
(Switzerland) Conny Perrin	6^{4}	5
6	(France) Chloé Paquet	6	4	6
7	(Turkey) İpek Öz	1	6	3

Final
1	(Italy) Lucrezia Stefanini	2	1
6	(France) Chloé Paquet	6	6

=== Top half ===
First round
1	(Italy) L Stefanini	6	7^{7}
SE	(Turkey) A Aksu	1	6^{2}
M Bondarenko	5	3
Q	(France) A Hesse	7	6
(Switzerland) V Ryser	1	2
Q	(France) L Boisson	6	6
(Norway) M Helgø	3	6	3
8	(Serbia) L Radivojević	6	4	2^{r}
3	(Switzerland) Y In-Albon	7^{12}	6
(Switzerland) J Dürst	6^{10}	4
Q	(Argentina) B Bonardi	4	6	3
E Maklakova	6	2	6
Q	(Sweden) F Östlund	1	6	6
Q	(France) E Salas	6	1	4
(Switzerland) C Perrin	6	6
5	(Austria) S Kraus	2	3

Second round
1	(Italy) L Stefanini	6	4
Q	(France) A Hesse	0	1^{r}
Q	(France) L Boisson	6	6
(Norway) M Helgø	1	1
3	(Switzerland) Y In-Albon	5	1
E Maklakova	7	6
Q	(Sweden) F Östlund	6^{2}	0
(Switzerland) C Perrin	7^{7}	6

Quarterfinals
1	(Italy) L Stefanini	6	6
Q	(France) L Boisson	3	4
E Maklakova	0	4
(Switzerland) C Perrin	6	6

Semifinals
1	(Italy) L Stefanini	7^{7}	7
(Switzerland) C Perrin	6^{4}	5

=== Bottom half ===
First round
6	(France) C Paquet	6	6
WC	(Switzerland) K Kozakova	2	4
(Czech Republic) A Sisková	2	2
(Brazil) G Cé	6	6
(Hungary) N Szabanin	6	3	4
Q	(Switzerland) F Ganz	3	6	6
WC	(Switzerland) S Scilipoti	2	2
4	P Kudermetova	6	6
7	(Turkey) İ Öz	7^{7}	2	7^{7}
WC	(Switzerland) L Küng	6^{4}	6	6^{5}
WC	(Switzerland) A Granwehr	6	2	7
Q	(Italy) J Pieri	2	6	5
(Latvia) D Marcinkēviča	3	6	6^{5}
(Czech Republic) M Bayerlová	6	4	7^{7}
Q	(Australia) TN Smith	7	0
2	(Spain) N Párrizas Díaz	5	0^{r}

Second round
6	(France) C Paquet	6	3	6
(Brazil) G Cé	3	6	3
Q	(Switzerland) F Ganz	5	2
4	P Kudermetova	7	6
7	(Turkey) İ Öz	6	6
WC	(Switzerland) A Granwehr	1	0
(Czech Republic) M Bayerlová	1	5
Q	(Australia) TN Smith	6	7

Quarterfinals
6	(France) C Paquet	6	6
4	P Kudermetova	2	1
7	(Turkey) İ Öz	6	6
Q	(Australia) TN Smith	2	4

Semifinals
6	(France) C Paquet	6	4	6
7	(Turkey) İ Öz	1	6	3
