= 2020 ITF Men's World Tennis Tour =

Details
- Duration: 6 January 2020 – 3 January 2021
- Edition: 23rd
- Tournaments: 152
- Categories: M25 tournaments (36); M15 tournaments (116)

Achievements (singles)
- Most titles: (Italy) Alessandro Bega (Poland) Kacper Żuk (4)
- Most finals: (Portugal) Nuno Borges (Monaco) Lucas Catarina (6)

The 2020 International Tennis Federation (ITF) Men's World Tennis Tour is a second-tier tour for Men's professional tennis. It is organized by the International Tennis Federation and is a tier below the ATP Challenger Tour. The ITF Men's World Tennis Tour includes tournaments with prize money ranging from $15,000 to $25,000. The ITF Men's World Tennis Tour is the product of reforms designed to support talented junior players in their progression to the senior game, and target the prize money effectively at professional tournaments to enable more players to make a living.

The ITF Men's World Tennis Tour was suspended between 13 March to 16 August due to the coronavirus pandemic.

Due to the pandemic, only 152 tournaments were held in the 2020 season, 388 tournaments less than in 2019.

== Schedule ==
=== April–June ===
No tournaments held due to the COVID-19 pandemic

== Participating host nations ==
- Argentina (ARG)
- Australia (AUS)
- Austria (AUT)
- Croatia (CRO)
- Czech Republic (CZE)
- Dominican Republic (DOM)
- Egypt (EGY)
- Estonia (EST)
- France (FRA)
- Germany (GER)
- Great Britain (GBR)
- Greece (GRE)
- Hong Kong (HKG)
- India (IND)
- Italy (ITA)
- Kazakhstan (KAZ)
- Mexico (MEX)
- Netherlands (NED)
- Peru (PER)
- Poland (POL)
- Portugal (POR)
- Qatar (QAT)
- Romania (ROU)
- Russia (RUS)
- Slovakia (SVK)
- South Africa (RSA)
- Spain (ESP)
- Switzerland (SUI)
- Thailand (THA)
- Tunisia (TUN)
- Turkey (TUR)
- Ukraine (UKR)
- United States (USA)
- Uruguay (URU)

== Tournament breakdown by event category ==
Event category	Number of events	Total prize money
$25,000	36	$900,000
$15,000	116	$1,740,000
Total	152	$2,640,000

== Ranking points distribution ==
Category	W	F	SF	QF	R16	R32	Q	Q2	Q1
↓ ATP Ranking Points ↓
M25+H (S) / M25 (S)	20	12	6	3	1	–	–	–	–
M25+H (D) / M25 (D)	20	12	6	3	–	–	–	–	–
M15+H (S) / M15 (S)	10	6	4	2	1	–	–	–	–
M15+H (D) / M15 (D)	10	6	4	2	–	–	–	–	–
↓ ITF World Tennis Ranking Points ↓
M25+H (S)	–	–	–	–	–	–	4	1	–
M25 (S)	–	–	–	–	–	–	3	1	–
M15+H (S)	–	–	–	–	–	–	3	1	–
M15 (S)	–	–	–	–	–	–	2	1	–

- "+H" indicates that hospitality is provided.

== Prize money distribution ==
Category	W	F	SF	QF	R16	R32
M25+H (S) / M25 (S)	$3,600	$2,120	$1,255	$730	$430	$260
M25+H (D) / M25 (D)	$1,550	$900	$540	$320	$180	–
M15+H (S) / M15 (S)	$2,160	$1,272	$753	$438	$258	$156
M15+H (D) / M15 (D)	$930	$540	$324	$192	$108	–

- Doubles prize money per team

== Statistics ==
These tables present the number of singles (S) and doubles (D) titles won by each player and each nation during the season. The players/nations are sorted by:

1. Total number of titles (a doubles title won by two players representing the same nation counts as only one win for the nation)
2. A singles > doubles hierarchy
3. Alphabetical order (by family names for players).

To avoid confusion and double counting, these tables should be updated only after all events of the week are completed.

=== Titles won by player ===
2020 Titles won by player

Total	Player	M25		M15		Total	
Total	Player	S	D	S	D	S	D
9	David Pichler (AUT)				9	0	9
8	Alexander Erler (AUT)				8	0	8
7	Kacper Żuk (POL)	4	3			4	3
6	Vladyslav Manafov (UKR)		1		5	0	6
5	Jan Zieliński (POL)		5			0	5
5	Fabian Fallert (GER)		1		4	0	5
4	Alessandro Bega (ITA)			4		4	0
4	Holger Vitus Nødskov Rune (DEN)	1		2	1	3	1
4	Nuno Borges (POR)			3	1	3	1
4	Evan Furness (FRA)			3	1	3	1
4	Benjamin Bonzi (FRA)	2	2			2	2
4	Skander Mansouri (TUN)			2	2	2	2
4	Mateus Alves (BRA)			1	3	1	3
4	Juan Pablo Paz (ARG)			1	3	1	3
4	Aziz Dougaz (TUN)				4	0	4
4	Anis Ghorbel (TUN)				4	0	4
4	Igor Marcondes (BRA)				4	0	4
4	Shintaro Mochizuki (JPN)				4	0	4
3	Igor Sijsling (NED)	2		1		3	0
3	Lucas Catarina (MON)			3		3	0
3	Laurynas Grigelis (LTU)			3		3	0
3	Timofei Skatov (KAZ)			3		3	0
3	Ruben Bemelmans (BEL)	2	1			2	1
3	Facundo Díaz Acosta (ARG)	1		1	1	2	1
3	Javier Barranco Cosano (ESP)			2	1	2	1
3	Vladyslav Orlov (UKR)			2	1	2	1
3	Nikolás Sánchez Izquierdo (ESP)			2	1	2	1
3	Sergey Fomin (UZB)			1	2	1	2
3	Nick Hardt (DOM)			1	2	1	2
3	Johannes Härteis (GER)		2		1	0	3
3	Artem Dubrivnyy (RUS)				3	0	3
3	Peter Heller (GER)				3	0	3
2	Duje Ajduković (CRO)	1		1		2	0
2	Petros Chrysochos (CYP)	1		1		2	0
2	Yuta Shimizu (JPN)	1		1		2	0
2	Carlos Alcaraz (ESP)			2		2	0
2	Antoine Cornut-Chauvinc (FRA)			2		2	0
2	Sebastian Fanselow (GER)			2		2	0
2	Ergi Kırkın (TUR)			2		2	0
2	Thomas Laurent (FRA)			2		2	0
2	Pablo Vivero González (ESP)			2		2	0
2	Marcelo Tomás Barrios Vera (CHI)	1	1			1	1
2	Manuel Guinard (FRA)	1	1			1	1
2	Uladzimir Ignatik (BLR)	1	1			1	1
2	Agustín Velotti (ARG)	1	1			1	1
2	Lucas Poullain (FRA)	1			1	1	1
2	Sebastián Báez (ARG)		1	1		1	1
2	Pedro Cachin (ARG)		1	1		1	1
2	Jonáš Forejtek (CZE)		1	1		1	1
2	Strong Kirchheimer (USA)		1	1		1	1
2	Bogdan Bobrov (RUS)			1	1	1	1
2	Riccardo Bonadio (ITA)			1	1	1	1
2	Giovanni Fonio (ITA)			1	1	1	1
2	Lucas Miedler (AUT)			1	1	1	1
2	João Lucas Reis da Silva (BRA)			1	1	1	1
2	Jan Šátral (CZE)			1	1	1	1
2	Miljan Zekić (SRB)			1	1	1	1
2	Daniel Dutra da Silva (BRA)		2			0	2
2	Szymon Walków (POL)		2			0	2
2	Jesper de Jong (NED)		1		1	0	2
2	Neil Oberleitner (AUT)		1		1	0	2
2	Oriol Roca Batalla (ESP)		1		1	0	2
2	Aldin Šetkić (BIH)		1		1	0	2
2	Michael Vrbenský (CZE)		1		1	0	2
2	Patrick Zahraj (GER)		1		1	0	2
2	Adrian Barbu (ROU)				2	0	2
2	Marco Bortolotti (ITA)				2	0	2
2	Luca Castelnuovo (SUI)				2	0	2
2	Moez Echargui (TUN)				2	0	2
2	Sanjar Fayziev (UZB)				2	0	2
2	Max Houkes (NED)				2	0	2
2	Alexander Igoshin (RUS)				2	0	2
2	Arjun Kadhe (IND)				2	0	2
2	Timur Kiyamov (RUS)				2	0	2
2	Alejo Lorenzo Lingua Lavallén (ARG)				2	0	2
2	Daniel Michalski (POL)				2	0	2
2	Nicolas Moreno de Alboran (USA)				2	0	2
2	Ryan Nijboer (NED)				2	0	2
2	Juan Bautista Otegui (ARG)				2	0	2
2	Jakub Paul (SUI)				2	0	2
2	Vitaliy Sachko (UKR)				2	0	2
2	Yaraslav Shyla (BLR)				2	0	2
2	Khumoyun Sultanov (UZB)				2	0	2
2	Clément Tabur (FRA)				2	0	2
2	Evgenii Tiurnev (RUS)				2	0	2
2	Kai Wehnelt (GER)				2	0	2
1	Facundo Argüello (ARG)	1				1	0
1	Francisco Cerúndolo (ARG)	1				1	0
1	Jack Draper (GBR)	1				1	0
1	Gastão Elias (POR)	1				1	0
1	Brydan Klein (GBR)	1				1	0
1	Jiří Lehečka (CZE)	1				1	0
1	Pablo Llamas Ruiz (ESP)	1				1	0
1	Brandon Nakashima (USA)	1				1	0
1	Matija Pecotić (CRO)	1				1	0
1	Gianluigi Quinzi (ITA)	1				1	0
1	Alexander Ritschard (USA)	1				1	0
1	Santiago Rodríguez Taverna (ARG)	1				1	0
1	Ronald Slobodchikov (RUS)	1				1	0
1	Camilo Ugo Carabelli (ARG)	1				1	0
1	Alexey Zakharov (RUS)	1				1	0
1	Nicolás Álvarez Varona (ESP)			1		1	0
1	Adrian Andreev (BUL)			1		1	0
1	Antoine Bellier (SUI)			1		1	0
1	Zizou Bergs (BEL)			1		1	0
1	Geoffrey Blancaneaux (FRA)			1		1	0
1	Gijs Brouwer (NED)			1		1	0
1	Gage Brymer (USA)			1		1	0
1	Arthur Cazaux (FRA)			1		1	0
1	Felix Corwin (USA)			1		1	0
1	Oliver Crawford (USA)			1		1	0
1	Baptiste Crepatte (FRA)			1		1	0
1	Sandro Ehrat (SUI)			1		1	0
1	Antoine Escoffier (FRA)			1		1	0
1	Alexis Galarneau (CAN)			1		1	0
1	Clément Geens (BEL)			1		1	0
1	Omar Giacalone (ITA)			1		1	0
1	Carlos Gimeno Valero (ESP)			1		1	0
1	Christopher Heyman (BEL)			1		1	0
1	Nicholas David Ionel (ROU)			1		1	0
1	Filip Cristian Jianu (ROU)			1		1	0
1	Danylo Kalenichenko (UKR)			1		1	0
1	Aziz Kijametović (BIH)			1		1	0
1	Georgii Kravchenko (UKR)			1		1	0
1	Patrick Kypson (USA)			1		1	0
1	Karim-Mohamed Maamoun (EGY)			1		1	0
1	Jules Marie (FRA)			1		1	0
1	Javier Martí (ESP)			1		1	0
1	Pol Martín Tiffon (ESP)			1		1	0
1	Alexis Musialek (FRA)			1		1	0
1	Luca Nardi (ITA)			1		1	0
1	Johan Nikles (SUI)			1		1	0
1	Ricardo Ojeda Lara (ESP)			1		1	0
1	Manuel Peña López (ARG)			1		1	0
1	Zsombor Piros (HUN)			1		1	0
1	Mārtiņš Podžus (LAT)			1		1	0
1	Luca Potenza (ITA)			1		1	0
1	Gleb Sakharov (FRA)			1		1	0
1	Alexander Shevchenko (RUS)			1		1	0
1	Kristjan Tamm (EST)			1		1	0
1	Thiago Agustín Tirante (ARG)			1		1	0
1	Juan Bautista Torres (ARG)			1		1	0
1	Kaichi Uchida (JPN)			1		1	0
1	Otto Virtanen (FIN)			1		1	0
1	Franco Agamenone (ARG)		1			0	1
1	Boris Arias (BOL)		1			0	1
1	Nicolás Barrientos (COL)		1			0	1
1	Jeremy Beale (AUS)		1			0	1
1	Justin Butsch (USA)		1			0	1
1	Ignacio Carou (URU)		1			0	1
1	Íñigo Cervantes (ESP)		1			0	1
1	Chung Yun-seong (KOR)		1			0	1
1	Francisco Comesaña (ARG)		1			0	1
1	Martín Cuevas (URU)		1			0	1
1	Daniel Cukierman (ISR)		1			0	1
1	Martin Damm (USA)		1			0	1
1	Corentin Denolly (FRA)		1			0	1
1	Sadio Doumbia (FRA)		1			0	1
1	Viktor Durasovic (NOR)		1			0	1
1	Markus Eriksson (SWE)		1			0	1
1	Tomás Martín Etcheverry (ARG)		1			0	1
1	Thomas Fancutt (AUS)		1			0	1
1	Sergio Galdós (PER)		1			0	1
1	Michael Geerts (BEL)		1			0	1
1	Lloyd Glasspool (GBR)		1			0	1
1	Carlos Gómez-Herrera (ESP)		1			0	1
1	Conner Huertas del Pino (PER)		1			0	1
1	Mariano Kestelboim (ARG)		1			0	1
1	Lukáš Klein (SVK)		1			0	1
1	Toby Kodat (USA)		1			0	1
1	Alex Lawson (USA)		1			0	1
1	Ivan Liutarevich (BLR)		1			0	1
1	Matteo Martineau (FRA)		1			0	1
1	Daniel Masur (GER)		1			0	1
1	Junior Alexander Ore (USA)		1			0	1
1	Sonchat Ratiwatana (THA)		1			0	1
1	Fabien Reboul (FRA)		1			0	1
1	Alex Rybakov (USA)		1			0	1
1	Jelle Sels (NED)		1			0	1
1	Riley Smith (USA)		1			0	1
1	Wishaya Trongcharoenchaikul (THA)		1			0	1
1	Umut Akkoyun (TUR)				1	0	1
1	Nicolás Alberto Arreche (ARG)				1	0	1
1	Théo Arribagé (FRA)				1	0	1
1	Alberto Barroso Campos (ESP)				1	0	1
1	Jonathan Binding (GBR)				1	0	1
1	Bogdan Borza (ROU)				1	0	1
1	Peter Bothwell (IRL)				1	0	1
1	Charles Broom (GBR)				1	0	1
1	Francisco Cabral (POR)				1	0	1
1	Julien Cagnina (BEL)				1	0	1
1	Simon Carr (IRL)				1	0	1
1	Benjamin D'Hoe (BEL)				1	0	1
1	Michał Dembek (POL)				1	0	1
1	Titouan Droguet (FRA)				1	0	1
1	Anas Fattar (MAR)				1	0	1
1	Davide Galoppini (ITA)				1	0	1
1	Gerard Granollers (ESP)				1	0	1
1	Billy Harris (GBR)				1	0	1
1	Evan Hoyt (GBR)				1	0	1
1	Hsu Yu-hsiou (TPE)				1	0	1
1	Vladimir Ivanov (EST)				1	0	1
1	Luke Johnson (GBR)				1	0	1
1	Alibek Kachmazov (RUS)				1	0	1
1	Duje Kekez (CRO)				1	0	1
1	Timur Khabibulin (KAZ)				1	0	1
1	Majed Kilani (TUN)				1	0	1
1	Álvaro López San Martín (ESP)				1	0	1
1	Gerardo López Villaseñor (MEX)				1	0	1
1	Dragoș Nicolae Mădăraș (SWE)				1	0	1
1	Gergely Madarász (HUN)				1	0	1
1	Călin Manda (ROU)				1	0	1
1	Piotr Matuszewski (POL)				1	0	1
1	Marko Miladinović (SRB)				1	0	1
1	Michał Mikuła (POL)				1	0	1
1	Lasse Muscheites (GER)				1	0	1
1	Eduardo Nava (USA)				1	0	1
1	Emilio Nava (USA)				1	0	1
1	Rio Noguchi (JPN)				1	0	1
1	Lamine Ouahab (MAR)				1	0	1
1	Aziz Ouakaa (TUN)				1	0	1
1	Ștefan Paloși (ROU)				1	0	1
1	Andrew Paulson (CZE)				1	0	1
1	Stijn Pel (NED)				1	0	1
1	David Pérez Sanz (ESP)				1	0	1
1	David Poljak (CZE)				1	0	1
1	Sidané Pontjodikromo (NED)				1	0	1
1	Oleg Prihodko (UKR)				1	0	1
1	Matheus Pucinelli de Almeida (BRA)				1	0	1
1	Ajeet Rai (NZL)				1	0	1
1	Arthur Reymond (FRA)				1	0	1
1	Patrik Rikl (CZE)				1	0	1
1	Albert Roglan (ESP)				1	0	1
1	Mats Rosenkranz (GER)				1	0	1
1	Valentin Royer (FRA)				1	0	1
1	Niklas Schell (GER)				1	0	1
1	Constantin Schmitz (GER)				1	0	1
1	Johannes Seeman (EST)				1	0	1
1	Stefan Seifert (GER)				1	0	1
1	Abedallah Shelbayh (JOR)				1	0	1
1	Glenn Smits (NED)				1	0	1
1	Matías Soto (CHI)				1	0	1
1	Robin Staněk (CZE)				1	0	1
1	Maik Steiner (GER)				1	0	1
1	Bart Stevens (NED)				1	0	1
1	Timo Stodder (GER)				1	0	1
1	Robert Strombachs (GER)				1	0	1
1	Fermín Tenti (ARG)				1	0	1
1	Louis Tessa (FRA)				1	0	1
1	Aristotelis Thanos (GRE)				1	0	1
1	Peter Torebko (GER)				1	0	1
1	Siim Troost (EST)				1	0	1
1	Petros Tsitsipas (GRE)				1	0	1
1	Vadym Ursu (UKR)				1	0	1
1	Mick Veldheer (NED)				1	0	1
1	Pedro Vives Marcos (ESP)				1	0	1
1	Hugo Voljacques (FRA)				1	0	1
1	Brandon Walkin (AUS)				1	0	1
1	Benjamín Winter López (ESP)				1	0	1
1	Paul Wörner (GER)				1	0	1
1	Yann Wójcik (POL)				1	0	1
1	Denis Yevseyev (KAZ)				1	0	1

=== Titles won by nation ===
2020 Titles won by nation

Total	Nation	M25		M15		Total	
Total	Nation	S	D	S	D	S	D
29	France (FRA)	4	4	14	7	18	11
25	Argentina (ARG)	6	5	6	8	12	13
22	Spain (ESP)	1	2	13	6	14	8
18	Germany (GER)		3	2	13	2	16
16	United States (USA)	2	6	5	3	7	9
14	Poland (POL)	4	5		5	4	10
14	Ukraine (UKR)		1	4	9	4	10
13	Italy (ITA)	1		9	3	10	3
13	Russia (RUS)	2		2	9	4	9
13	Austria (AUT)		1	1	11	1	12
11	Netherlands (NED)	2	1	2	6	4	7
10	Brazil (BRA)		2	2	6	2	8
10	Tunisia (TUN)			2	8	2	8
9	Belgium (BEL)	2	2	3	2	5	4
9	Czech Republic (CZE)	1	1	2	5	3	6
7	Japan (JPN)	1		2	4	3	4
7	Great Britain (GBR)	2	1		4	2	5
6	Switzerland (SUI)			3	3	3	3
6	Romania (ROU)			2	4	2	4
5	Portugal (POR)	1		3	1	4	1
5	Kazakhstan (KAZ)			3	2	3	2
5	Belarus (BLR)	1	2		2	1	4
5	Uzbekistan (UZB)			1	4	1	4
4	Croatia (CRO)	2		1	1	3	1
4	Denmark (DEN)	1		2	1	3	1
3	Monaco (MON)			3		3	0
3	Lithuania (LTU)			3		3	0
3	Turkey (TUR)			2	1	2	1
3	Chile (CHI)	1	1		1	1	2
3	Bosnia and Herzegovina (BIH)		1	1	1	1	2
3	Dominican Republic (DOM)			1	2	1	2
3	Estonia (EST)			1	2	1	2
2	Cyprus (CYP)	1		1		2	0
2	Hungary (HUN)			1	1	1	1
2	Serbia (SRB)			1	1	1	1
2	Uruguay (URU)		2			0	2
2	Australia (AUS)		1		1	0	2
2	Sweden (SWE)		1		1	0	2
2	India (IND)				2	0	2
2	Ireland (IRL)				2	0	2
1	Bulgaria (BUL)			1		1	0
1	Canada (CAN)			1		1	0
1	Egypt (EGY)			1		1	0
1	Finland (FIN)			1		1	0
1	Latvia (LAT)			1		1	0
1	Bolivia (BOL)		1			0	1
1	Colombia (COL)		1			0	1
1	Israel (ISR)		1			0	1
1	Norway (NOR)		1			0	1
1	Peru (PER)		1			0	1
1	Slovakia (SVK)		1			0	1
1	South Korea (KOR)		1			0	1
1	Thailand (THA)		1			0	1
1	Chinese Taipei (TPE)				1	0	1
1	Greece (GRE)				1	0	1
1	Jordan (JOR)				1	0	1
1	Mexico (MEX)				1	0	1
1	Morocco (MAR)				1	0	1
1	New Zealand (NZL)				1	0	1

== See also ==
- 2020 ATP Tour
- 2020 ATP Challenger Tour
- 2020 ITF Women's World Tennis Tour
