= 2021 TCCB Open – Doubles =

Doubles
- 2021 TCCB Open

Final
- Champions: (Russia) Amina Anshba (Russia) Anastasia Gasanova
- Runners-up: (France) Amandine Hesse (Germany) Tatjana Maria
- Score: 6–1, 6–7^{(6–8)}, [10–8]

Events
Singles	Doubles
- TCCB Open

This was the first edition of the tournament.

Amina Anshba and Anastasia Gasanova won the title, defeating Amandine Hesse and Tatjana Maria in the final, 6–1, 6–7^{(6–8)}, [10–8].

== Seeds ==
1. (France) Amandine Hesse / (Germany) Tatjana Maria (final)
2. (Switzerland) Conny Perrin / (France) Jessika Ponchet (first round)
3. (Russia) Alena Fomina-Klotz / (Russia) Ekaterina Yashina (quarterfinals)
4. (Switzerland) Xenia Knoll / (Switzerland) Simona Waltert (quarterfinals)

== Draw ==
Key

- Q = Qualifier
- WC = Wild card
- LL = Lucky loser
- Alt = Alternate
- ITF = ITF entry
- PR = Protected ranking
- SR = Special ranking
- SE = Special exempt
- JE = Junior exempt
- JR = Junior Accelerator Programme entrant
- CO = College Accelerator Programme entrant
- NG = Next Gen Accelerator Program entrant
- w/o = Walkover
- r = Retired
- d = Defaulted

=== Draw ===
First round
1	(France) A Hesse (Germany) T Maria	6	7
WC	(Switzerland) A Granwehr (Switzerland) V Ryser	1	5
(Switzerland) J Dürst (Switzerland) N Stadler	2	6	[8]
(India) S Bavisetti (Russia) A Gabueva	6	3	[10]
4	(Switzerland) X Knoll (Switzerland) S Waltert	6	6^{6}	[11]
(Japan) Y Naito (Belgium) L Salden	2	7^{8}	[9]
WC	(Romania) K Bejenaru (France) Y Mansouri	2	6	[10]
Alt	(Austria) T Paszek (United States) C Scholl	6	2	[6]
(Switzerland) M Mettraux (Switzerland) J Züger	2	6	[5]
(Romania) O Gavrilă (Turkey) İ Öz	6	0	[10]
WC	(Switzerland) C Naef (Switzerland) S Scilipoti	7^{7}	2	[6]
3	(Russia) A Fomina-Klotz (Russia) E Yashina	6^{5}	6	[10]
(Russia) A Anshba (Russia) A Gasanova	2	6	[10]
(France) E Cascino (Italy) C Rosatello	6	3	[5]
(Brazil) B Haddad Maia (Latvia) D Marcinkēviča	7^{9}	4	[10]
2	(Switzerland) C Perrin (France) J Ponchet	6^{7}	6	[7]

Quarterfinals
1	(France) A Hesse (Germany) T Maria	6	6
(India) S Bavisetti (Russia) A Gabueva	3	4
4	(Switzerland) X Knoll (Switzerland) S Waltert	3	3
WC	(Romania) K Bejenaru (France) Y Mansouri	6	6
(Romania) O Gavrilă (Turkey) İ Öz	6	6
3	(Russia) A Fomina-Klotz (Russia) E Yashina	3	4
(Russia) A Anshba (Russia) A Gasanova	7^{7}	6
(Brazil) B Haddad Maia (Latvia) D Marcinkēviča	6^{2}	2

Semifinals
1	(France) A Hesse (Germany) T Maria	7	6
WC	(Romania) K Bejenaru (France) Y Mansouri	5	3
(Romania) O Gavrilă (Turkey) İ Öz	3	4
(Russia) A Anshba (Russia) A Gasanova	6	6

Final
1	(France) A Hesse (Germany) T Maria	1	7^{8}	[8]
(Russia) A Anshba (Russia) A Gasanova	6	6^{6}	[10]
