= Kajsa Rinaldo Persson =

Swedish tennis player (born 1997)

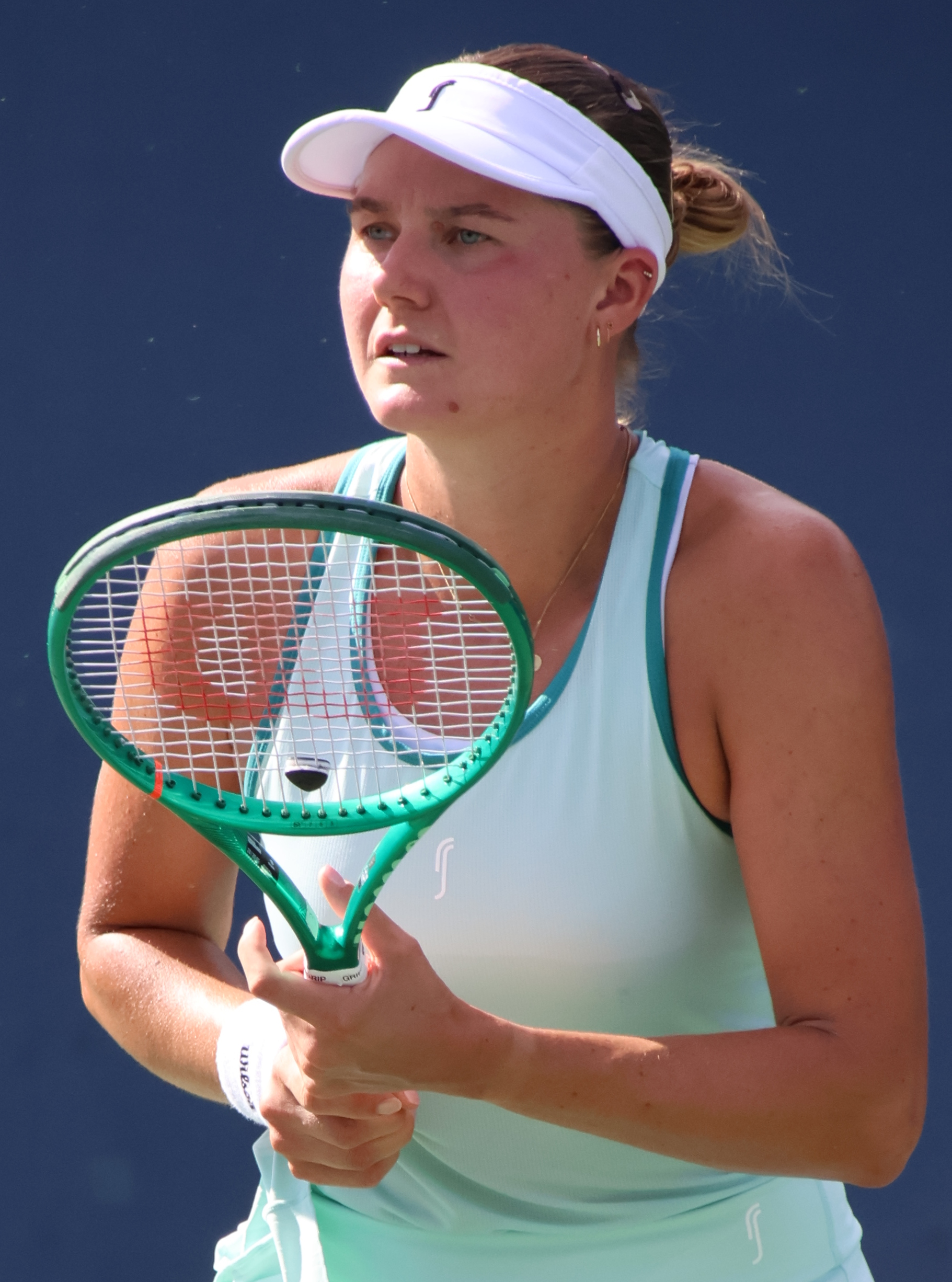
- Persson at the 2026 US Open
- Country (sports): Sweden
- Born: 11 November 1997 (age 29)
- Plays: Right (two-handed backhand)
- Prize money: $112,070

Singles
- Career record: 255–168
- Career titles: 7 ITF
- Highest ranking: No. 208 (15 June 2026)
- Current ranking: No. 227 (9 November 2026)

Grand Slam singles results
- US Open: Q1 (2026)

Doubles
- Career record: 65–60
- Career titles: 4 ITF
- Highest ranking: No. 532 (21 August 2023)

Team competitions
- Fed Cup: 13–11
- Last updated on: 8 November 2026.

Kajsa Rinaldo Persson (born 11 November 1997) is a Swedish tennis player. She has a career-high singles ranking of world No. 208 by the WTA, achieved on 15 June 2026, and a doubles ranking of No. 532, reached on 21 August 2023. She has won five titles in singles and four in doubles on the ITF Circuit.

Rinaldo Persson has represented Sweden in the Fed Cup, where she has a win–loss record of 13–11, as of 2026.

== ITF Circuit finals ==
=== Singles: 12 (8 titles, 4 runner–ups) ===
Legend W100 tournaments W40/50 tournaments W25/35 tournaments W10/15 tournaments	Finals by surface Hard (2–0) Clay (6–4)

Result	W–L	Date	Tournament	Tier	Surface	Opponent	Score
Loss	0–1	May 2015	ITF Båstad, Sweden	W10	Clay	(Germany) Laura Schaeder	7–5, 0–6, 2–6
Win	1–1	May 2015	ITF Båstad, Sweden	W10	Clay	(Italy) Valeria Prosperi	6–4, 7–6^{(1)}
Win	2–1	Jun 2022	ITF Heraklion, Greece	W15	Clay	(Slovakia) Irina Balus	4–6, 6–4, 6–4
Win	3–1	Nov 2022	ITF Lousada, Portugal	W15	Hard (i)	(Spain) Celia Cerviño Ruiz	7–5, 6–2
Win	4–1	Apr 2024	ITF Boca Raton, United States	W35	Clay	(Japan) Mayu Crossley	7–5, 7–6^{(8)}
Win	5–1	May 2024	ITF Bethany Beach, United States	W35	Clay	(United States) Akasha Urhobo	4–6, 6–3, 6–2
Win	6–1	Aug 2024	ITF Koksijde, Belgium	W35	Clay	(France) Jenny Lim	6–4, 4–6, 7–6^{(5)}
Loss	6–2	May 2025	ITF Portorož, Slovenia	W50	Clay	(Ukraine) Oleksandra Oliynykova	6–3, 2–6, 4–6
Loss	6–3	Aug 2025	ITF Bydgoszcz, Poland	W35	Clay	(Italy) Tatiana Pieri	2–6, 3–6
Win	7–3	Aug 2025	ITF Bytom, Polanda	W50	Clay	(Italy) Tyra Caterina Grant	6–3, 6–3
Loss	7–4	Jun 2026	Zagreb Ladies Open, Croatia	W100	Clay	(Armenia) Elina Avanesyan	1–6, 3–6
Win	8–4	Oct 2026	ITF Quebec City, Canada	W50	Hard (i)	(United Kingdom) Mimi Xu	6–4, 6–2

=== Doubles: 9 (4 titles, 5 runner–ups) ===
Legend W25/35 tournaments W10/15 tournaments	Finals by surface Hard (1–5) Clay (3–0)

Result	W–L	Date	Tournament	Tier	Surface	Partner	Opponents	Score
Loss	0–1	Jan 2015	ITF Sharm El Sheikh, Egypt	W10	Hard	(Norway) Caroline Rohde-Moe	(Japan) Shiho Akita (Japan) Yuuki Tanaka	2–6, 6–7^{(3)}
Win	1–1	Sep 2015	ITF Antalya, Turkey	W10	Hard	(Sweden) Jacqueline Cabaj Awad	(Paraguay) Sara Giménez (Sweden) Fanny Östlund	6–3, 6–4
Loss	1–2	Nov 2015	ITF El Kantaoui, Tunisia	W10	Hard	(Slovenia) Natalija Šipek	(Sweden) Linnéa Malmqvist (Russia) Yana Sizikova	4–6, 2–6
Loss	1–3	Apr 2017	ITF Sharm El Sheikh, Egypt	W15	Hard	(Denmark) Emilie Francati	(Romania) Laura-Ioana Andrei (Austria) Melanie Klaffner	4–6, 5–7
Win	2–3	Jun 2017	ITF Hammamet, Tunisia	W15	Clay	(Slovakia) Barbara Kötelesová	(France) Victoria Muntean (Germany) Julia Wachaczyk	7–6^{(5)}, 4–6, [10–7]
Loss	2–4	Sep 2017	ITF Kyoto, Japan	W15	Hard (i)	(Japan) Ayaka Okuno	(Japan) Akari Inoue (Japan) Michika Ozeki	6–4, 3–6, [8–10]
Loss	2–5	Feb 2021	ITF Sharm El Sheikh, Egypt	W15	Hard	(Sweden) Julita Saner	(Japan) Lisa-Marie Rioux (Japan) Erika Sema	1–6, 6–1, [6–10]
Win	3–5	Oct 2021	ITF Antalya, Turkey	W15	Clay	(Sweden) Vanessa Ersöz	(Netherlands) Jasmijn Gimbrère (Italy) Irene Lavino	4–6, 6–1, [10–4]
Win	4–5	Aug 2023	ITF Koksijde, Belgium	W25	Clay	(Estonia) Maileen Nuudi	(Netherlands) Eva Vedder (Netherlands) Stéphanie Visscher	6–3, 2–6, [10–5]

== Fed Cup/Billie Jean King Cup participation ==
=== Doubles ===
Edition	Stage	Date	Location	Against	Surface	Partner	Opponents	W/L	Score
2017	ZG2 R/R	Apr 2017	Šiauliai (LTU)	Slovenia	Hard (i)	Jacqueline Cabaj Awad	Kaja Juvan; Andreja Klepač	L	3–6, 5–7
2017	ZG2 R/R	Apr 2017	Šiauliai (LTU)	Norway	Hard (i)	Jacqueline Cabaj Awad	Astrid Wanja Brune Olsen; Malene Helgø	W	6–2, 6–2
