= TCCB Open =

- 2022 TCCB Open

ITF Women's Tour
- Event name: TCCB Open
- Location: Collonge-Bellerive, Switzerland
- Venue: TC Collonge-Bellerive
- Category: ITF Women's World Tennis Tour
- Surface: Clay / Outdoor
- Draw: 32S/32Q/16D
- Prize money: $25,000
- Website: www.tccb.ch

The TCCB Open is a tournament for professional female tennis players played on outdoor clay courts. The event is classified as a $25,000 ITF Women's World Tennis Tour tournament and has been held in Collonge-Bellerive, Switzerland, since 2021. The tournament was offered $60,000 prize money between 2021 and 2023.

== Past finals ==
=== Singles ===
Year	Champion	Runner-up	Score
2024	(Turkey) Ayla Aksu	(Burundi) Sada Nahimana	3–6, 6–1, 6–4
2023	(France) Chloé Paquet	(Italy) Lucrezia Stefanini	6–2, 6–1
2022	(Italy) Lucrezia Stefanini	(Austria) Sinja Kraus	6–2, 2–1 ret.
2021	(Brazil) Beatriz Haddad Maia	(Turkey) İpek Öz	5–7, 6–1, 6–4

=== Doubles ===
Year	Champions	Runners-up	Score
2024	(Algeria) Inès Ibbou (Switzerland) Naïma Karamoko	(Switzerland) Karolina Kozakova (Switzerland) Valentina Ryser	7–6^{(7–0)}, 6–0
2023	(Switzerland) Conny Perrin (Czech Republic) Anna Sisková	(France) Estelle Cascino (Latvia) Diāna Marcinkēviča	7–6^{(7–4)}, 6–1
2022	(Switzerland) Jenny Dürst (Poland) Weronika Falkowska	(Czech Republic) Michaela Bayerlová (Sweden) Jacqueline Cabaj Awad	7–6^{(7–5)}, 6–1
2021	(Russia) Amina Anshba (Russia) Anastasia Gasanova	(France) Amandine Hesse (Germany) Tatjana Maria	6–1, 6–7^{(6–8)}, [10–8]
