= Ekaterina Kazionova =

Russian tennis player

- Full name: Ekaterina Andreevna Kazionova
- Native name: Екатерина Казионова
- Country (sports): Russia
- Born: 13 January 1999 (age 27)
- Plays: Right (two-handed backhand)
- Coach: Anton Chekhov
- Prize money: $172,558

Singles
- Career record: 315–260
- Career titles: 3 ITF
- Highest ranking: No. 280 (24 October 2022)
- Current ranking: No. 497 (21 September 2026)

Doubles
- Career record: 199–166
- Career titles: 11 ITF
- Highest ranking: No. 310 (30 January 2023)
- Current ranking: No. 475 (21 September 2026)
- Last updated on: 21 September 2026.

Ekaterina Andreevna Kazionova (Russian: Екатерина Андреевна Казионова; born 13 January 1999) is a Russian tennis player.

Kazionova has career-high WTA rankings of 280 in singles and 310 in doubles. Up to date, she has won three singles titles and eleven doubles tournaments on the ITF Circuit.

Kazionova made her WTA Tour main-draw debut at the 2022 Morocco Open, after receiving a wildcard entry into the doubles tournament, partnering with Yasmine Kabbaj.

== ITF Circuit finals ==
Legend
W100 tournaments
W75 tournaments
W25/35 tournaments
W10/15 tournaments

=== Singles: 11 (3 titles, 8 runner-ups) ===
Result	W–L	Date	Tournament	Tier	Surface	Opponent	Score
Loss	0–1	May 2015	ITF Port El Kantaoui, Tunisia	10,000	Hard	(Oman) Fatma Al-Nabhani	1–6, 4–6
Loss	0–2	Apr 2016	ITF Shymkent, Kazakhstan	10,000	Clay	(Kazakhstan) Kamila Kerimbayeva	4–6, 4–6
Loss	0–3	Jan 2017	ITF Almaty, Kazakhstan	15,000	Hard (i)	(Russia) Polina Monova	3–6, 3–6
Loss	0–4	Jan 2018	ITF Stuttgart, Germany	15,000	Hard (i)	(Czech Republic) Jesika Malečková	2–6, 0–6
Loss	0–5	Aug 2018	ITF Kazan, Russia	15,000	Clay	(Russia) Daria Mishina	1–6, 2–6
Loss	0–6	Jul 2019	ITF Savitaipale, Finland	15,000	Clay	(Finland) Anastasia Kulikova	6–4 6–7^{(3)} 2–6
Win	1–6	Oct 2019	ITF Oslo, Norway	15,000	Hard (i)	(Italy) Verena Meliss	6–3, 6–0
Loss	1–7	Nov 2019	ITF Pärnu, Estonia	15,000	Hard (i)	(Estonia) Elena Malõgina	4–6, 6–1, 5–7
Win	2–7	Feb 2020	ITF Moscow, Russia	W25	Hard (i)	(Russia) Kamilla Rakhimova	6–4, 1–6, 7–6^{(5)}
Loss	2–8	Oct 2021	ITF Karaganda, Kazakhstan	W25	Hard (i)	(Belarus) Yuliya Hatouka	5–7, 0–6
Win	3–8	Jul 2024	ITF Casablanca, Morocco	W15	Clay	(Germany) Joëlle Steur	6–3, 7–6^{(5)}

=== Doubles: 28 (11 titles, 17 runner-ups) ===
Result	W–L	Date	Tournament	Tier	Surface	Partner	Opponents	Score
Loss	0–1	Jul 2016	ITF Pärnu, Estonia	10k	Clay	(Latvia) Denīza Marcinkēviča	(United Kingdom) Emily Arbuthnott (Ukraine) Anastasia Zarycká	4–6, 5–7
Win	1–1	Sep 2016	ITF Kiryat Gat, Israel	10k	Hard	(United States) Madeleine Kobelt	(Israel) Vlada Katic (Turkey) Melis Sezer	7–6^{(5)}, 6–3
Loss	1–2	Oct 2016	ITF Tiberias, Israel	10k	Hard	(United States) Madeleine Kobelt	(Israel) Vlada Katic (Turkey) Melis Sezer	1–6, 3–6
Win	2–2	Apr 2017	ITF Istanbul, Turkey	15k	Hard (i)	(Kazakhstan) Elena Rybakina	(Greece) Eleni Daniilidou (Israel) Vlada Ekshibarova	6–1, 6–3
Loss	2–3	May 2017	ITF Khimki, Russia	25k	Hard (i)	(Russia) Daria Kruzhkova	(Russia) Olesya Pervushina (Russia) Anastasia Potapova	0–6, 1–6
Win	3–3	Jul 2017	ITF Focșani, Romania	15k	Clay	(Romania) Oana Gavrilă	(Italy) Martina Colmegna (Romania) Camelia Hristea	6–2, 6–1
Loss	3–4	Nov 2017	ITF Ortisei, Italy	15k	Hard (i)	(Russia) Alena Fomina-Klotz	(Belgium) Hélène Scholsen (Russia) Alina Silich	3–6, 5–7
Win	4–4	Oct 2018	ITF İstanbul, Turkey	25k	Hard (i)	(Russia) Polina Monova	(Croatia) Tereza Mrdeža (Serbia) Nina Stojanović	6–3, 6–7^{(5)}, [10–6]
Win	5–4	Feb 2019	ITF Shymkent, Kazakhstan	W15	Hard	(Russia) Anastasia Zakharova	(Serbia) Tamara Čurović (Estonia) Elena Malõgina	7–6^{(4)}, 6–1
Loss	5–5	Mar 2019	ITF Sharm El Sheikh, Egypt	W15	Hard	(Kazakhstan) Gozal Ainitdinova	(Sweden) Jacqueline Cabaj Awad (Turkey) İpek Soylu	2–6, 4–6
Loss	5–6	Apr 2019	ITF Calvi, France	W25	Hard	(Sweden) Linnéa Malmqvist	(France) Estelle Cascino (France) Elixane Lechemia	3–6, 2–6
Loss	5–7	May 2019	ITF Antalya, Turkey	W15	Clay	(Russia) Aleksandra Pospelova	(Switzerland) Jenny Dürst (Switzerland) Chiara Grimm	6–3, 1–6, [3–10]
Loss	5–8	May 2019	ITF Antalya, Turkey	W15	Clay	(Russia) Angelina Zhuravleva	(Switzerland) Chiara Grimm (Russia) Alina Silich	4–6, 2–6
Win	6–8	Aug 2019	ITF Savitaipale, Finland	W15	Clay	(Russia) Eva Garkusha	(Russia) Anna Makhorkina (Belarus) Sadafmoh Tolibova	6–2, 6–3
Loss	6–9	Sep 2019	ITF Prague, Czech Republic	W25	Clay	(Russia) Anastasiya Komardina	(Czech Republic) Anastasia Dețiuc (Czech Republic) Johana Marková	1–6, 3–6
Win	7–9	Oct 2019	ITF Oslo, Norway	W15	Hard (i)	(United Kingdom) Anna Popescu	(Lithuania) Iveta Dapkutė (Slovakia) Ingrid Vojčináková	3–6, 7–5, [10–5]
Win	8–9	Nov 2019	ITF Stockholm, Sweden	W15	Hard (i)	(Latvia) Margarita Ignatjeva	(Sweden) Jacqueline Cabaj Awad (Finland) Oona Orpana	2–6, 7–6^{(5)}, [10–4]
Win	9–9	Feb 2021	ITF Shymkent, Kazakhstan	W15	Hard (i)	(Uzbekistan) Sabina Sharipova	(Russia) Daria Mishina (Russia) Noel Saidenova	7–5, 2–6, [10–4]
Loss	9–10	Feb 2021	ITF Moscow, Russia	W25	Hard	(Belarus) Shalimar Talbi	(Greece) Valentini Grammatikopoulou (Russia) Anastasia Zakharova	3–6, 7–5, [8–10]
Loss	9–11	Sep 2021	ITF Vienna, Russia	W25	Hard	(Russia) Erika Andreeva	(Brazil) Carolina Alves (Poland) Martyna Kubka	7–6^{(1)}, 4–6, [7–10]
Loss	9–12	Oct 2021	ITF Karaganda, Kazakhstan	W25	Hard (i)	(Russia) Ekaterina Makarova	(Serbia) Tamara Čurović (Russia) Ekaterina Reyngold	6–2, 3–6, [7–10]
Loss	9–13	Aug 2022	ITF Ust-Kamenogorsk, Kazakhstan	W25	Hard	(Kazakhstan) Zhibek Kulambayeva	(Russia) Ekaterina Maklakova (Russia) Aleksandra Pospelova	6–7^{(5)}, 1–6
Loss	9–14	Nov 2022	ITF Saint-Étienne, France	W25	Hard (i)	(Russia) Ekaterina Makarova	(Switzerland) Conny Perrin (United Kingdom) Eden Silva	4–6, 6–4, [6–10]
Loss	9–15	Mar 2024	ITF Karaganda, Kazakhstan	W15	Hard	(Kazakhstan) Asylzhan Arystanbekova	(Russia) Victoria Mikhaylova (Ukraine) Anastasiia Poplavska	6–7^{(5)}, 3–6
Loss	9–16	Jun 2024	ITF Kuršumlijska Banja, Serbia	W15	Clay	(Russia) Victoria Borodulina	(Slovakia) Laura Cíleková (Slovakia) Natália Kročková	4–6, 7–5, [3–10]
Win	10–16	Aug 2024	ITF Mohammedia, Morocco	W35	Clay	(Republic of Ireland) Celine Simunyu	(Japan) Funa Kozaki (Japan) Ikumi Yamazaki	6–3, 6–3
Win	11–16	May 2025	ITF Kuršumlijska Banja, Serbia	W35	Clay	Arina Bulatova	(Colombia) María Herazo González (Serbia) Draginja Vuković	6–3, 7–6^{(4)}
Loss	11–17	Jun 2026	Zagreb Ladies Open, Croatia	W100	Clay	(Bulgaria) Rositsa Dencheva	(Croatia) Lucija Ćirić Bagarić (Italy) Angelica Moratelli	5–7, 3–6
