= Anastasia Gasanova =

Russian tennis player (born 1999)

Anastasia Gasanova Анастасия Гасанова
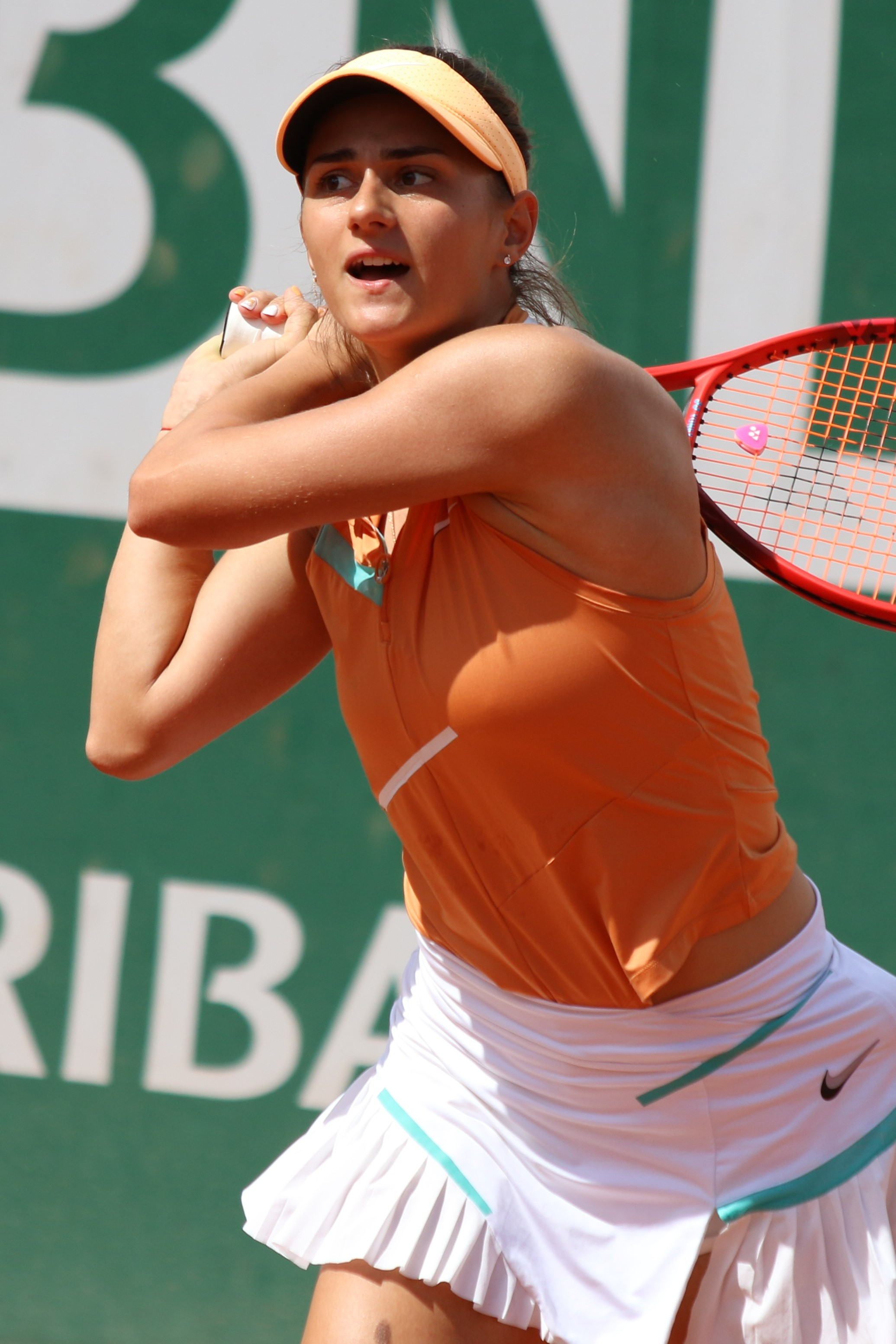
- Gasanova at the 2022 French Open
- Full name: Anastasia Dmitriyevna Gasanova
- Country (sports): Russia
- Born: 15 May 1999 (age 27) Saratov, Russia
- Height: 1.72 m (5 ft 8 in)
- Plays: Right-handed (two-handed backhand)
- Coach: Elena Brioukhovets (since 2013)
- Prize money: $800,020

Singles
- Career record: 354–205
- Career titles: 14 ITF
- Highest ranking: No. 121 (10 January 2022)
- Current ranking: No. 202 (26 October 2026)

Grand Slam singles results
- Australian Open: Q3 (2026)
- French Open: 1R (2022)
- Wimbledon: 2R (2026)
- US Open: Q1 (2022, 2026)

Doubles
- Career record: 143–115
- Career titles: 7 ITF
- Highest ranking: No. 224 (19 June 2023)
- Current ranking: No. 933 (26 October 2026)
- Last updated on: 26 October 2026.

Anastasia Dmitriyevna Gasanova (Russian: Анастасия Дмитриевна Гасанова, IPA: [ɐnəstɐˈsʲijə ɡɐˈsanəvə]; born 15 May 1999) is a Russian tennis player. Gasanova has a career-high singles ranking by the WTA of 121, achieved on 10 January 2022. She also has a career-high WTA ranking of 224 in doubles, reached in June 2023.

== Early life ==
Gasanova was born in Saratov, Russia on 15 May 1999. Her mother Svetlana is a tennis coach.

Anastasia started playing tennis at the age of three, with her mother being her first coach. Since 2013, she has been coached by both her mother and former WTA Tour player Elena Brioukhovets.

== Career ==
Gasanova made her WTA Tour main-draw debut at the 2021 Abu Dhabi Open by defeating Ena Shibahara in the final qualifying round. She scored her first top-100 win in the second round of that tournament, defeating world No. 6, Karolína Plíšková, in straight sets.

In March 2021, at the St. Petersburg Ladies' Trophy, Gasanova made it to her first quarterfinal of a WTA Tour event, after qualifying for the main draw. Her first-round match against Katarina Zavatska, and second-round win against Anastasia Pavlyuchenkova both broke the three hour mark and made it to the Marathon Marvels 2021: The longest matches of the year WTA list. At the same time, her match against Pavluchenkova made it to Great Escapes 2021: Winning from match point down. Gasanova lost the quarterfinal to Vera Zvonareva. In October 2021, her victorious match against Jil Teichmann in the first round of the Transylvania Open also made it to the WTA's Great Escapes 2021: Winning from match point down. Gasanova saved two match points and got her third victory against a top-50 player in 2021, with a score of 4–6, 6–0, 7–5.

At the 2022 French Open, she made her major debut as a lucky loser, replacing American player Lauren Davis, but was defeated in the first round by Marie Bouzková.

== Performance timeline ==
Key
W	F	SF	QF	#R	RR	Q#	DNQ	A	NH

(W) winner; (F) finalist; (SF) semifinalist; (QF) quarterfinalist; (#R) rounds 4, 3, 2, 1; (RR) round-robin stage; (Q#) qualification round; (DNQ) did not qualify; (A) absent; (NH) not held; (SR) strike rate (events won / competed); (W–L) win–loss record.
To avoid confusion and double counting, these charts are updated at the conclusion of a tournament or when the player's participation has ended.

Only main-draw results in WTA Tour, Grand Slam tournaments, Fed Cup/Billie Jean King Cup and Olympic Games are included in win–loss records.

=== Singles ===
Current through the 2026 WTA Tour.

Tournament	2021	2022	2023	2024	2025	2026	SR	W–L
Grand Slam tournaments
Australian Open	A	Q1	Q1	A	A	Q3	0 / 0	0–0
French Open	Q3	1R	A	A	A	Q1	0 / 1	0–1
Wimbledon	Q2	A (Note: Suspended due to politics.)	A	A	A	2R	0 / 1	1–1
US Open	A	Q1	A	A	A	Q1	0 / 0	0–0
Win–Loss	0–0	0–1	0–0	0–0	0–0	1–1	0 / 2	1–2
WTA 1000
Dubai / Qatar Open (Note: The first Premier 5 event of the year has switched back and forth between the Dubai Tennis Championships and the Qatar Ladies Open since 2009. Dubai was classified as a Premier 5 event from 2009 to 2011 before being succeeded by Doha for the 2012–2014 period. In 2015, Dubai regained its Premier 5 status while Doha was demoted to Premier status. The Premier 5 tournaments were reclassified as WTA 1000 tournaments in 2021.)	A	Q1	A	A	A	A	0 / 0	0–0
Indian Wells Open	A	Q2	A	A	A	A	0 / 0	0–0
Miami Open	A	Q1	A	A	A	A	0 / 0	0–0
Career statistics
Tournaments	7	7	0	0	0	0	Career total: 14	
Overall win–loss	8–7	3–7	0–0	0–0	0–0	0–0	0 / 14	11–14
Year-end ranking	138	179	453	450	201		$800,020	

== ITF Circuit finals ==
=== Singles: 25 (14 titles, 11 runner-ups) ===
Legend
W50 tournaments
W25/35 tournaments
W10/15 tournaments

Result	W–L	Date	Tournament	Tier	Surface	Opponent	Score
Win	1–0	Aug 2014	ITF Telavi, Georgia	10,000	Clay	(Moldova) Daniela Ciobanu	6–3, 6–3
Win	2–0	Jul 2015	ITF Telavi, Georgia	10,000	Clay	(Russia) Amina Anshba	6–3, 6–4
Win	3–0	Jul 2015	ITF Telavi, Georgia	10,000	Clay	(Armenia) Ani Amiraghyan	1–6, 6–4, 6–3
Win	4–0	Mar 2016	ITF Nanjing, China	10,000	Hard	(Chinese Taipei) Hsu Ching-wen	6–1, 6–1
Win	5–0	May 2016	ITF Khimki, Russia	10,000	Hard	(Russia) Yana Sizikova	3–6, 6–2, 6–3
Loss	5–1	Jul 2016	ITF Kazan, Russia	10,000	Clay	(Russia) Amina Anshba	7–5, 1–6, 0–6
Loss	5–2	Dec 2016	ITF Solapur, India	10,000	Hard	(Latvia) Diāna Marcinkēviča	3–6, 6–7^{(4–7)}
Loss	5–3	Apr 2018	ITF Karshi, Uzbekistan	25,000	Hard	(Russia) Olga Doroshina	2–6, 5–7
Win	6–3	Aug 2018	ITF Guiyang, China	25,000	Hard	(Serbia) Jovana Jakšić	6–3, 6–4
Loss	6–4	Jan 2019	ITF Kazan, Russia	W25	Hard (i)	(Russia) Varvara Flink	2–6, ret.
Loss	6–5	Jun 2019	ITF Incheon, South Korea	W25	Hard	(South Korea) Han Na-lae	3–6, 0–6
Loss	6–6	Oct 2019	ITF Nanning, China	W25	Hard	(Liechtenstein) Kathinka von Deichmann	6–4, 6–7^{(3–7)}, 5–7
Loss	6–7	Jun 2023	ITF La Marsa, Tunisia	W25	Hard	(India) Rutuja Bhosale	6–0, 3–6, 4–6
Win	7–7	Jun 2024	ITF Monastir, Tunisia	W15	Hard	(Egypt) Lamis Alhussein Abdel Aziz	6–2, 6–4
Win	8–7	Jul 2024	ITF Ust-Kamenogorsk, Kazakhstan	W15	Hard	(Japan) Ayumi Koshiishi	6–2, 6–1
Win	9–7	Oct 2024	ITF Sharm El Sheikh, Egypt	W15	Hard	(Romania) Alexandra Iordache	6–4, 6–0
Win	10–7	Oct 2024	ITF Sharm El Sheikh	W15	Hard	(Kosovo) Arlinda Rushiti	6–4, 6–0
Win	11–7	Dec 2024	ITF Sharm El Sheikh	W35	Hard	(Chinese Taipei) Joanna Garland	6–3, 7–6^{(1)}
Loss	11–8	Feb 2025	ITF Antalya, Turkiye	W35	Clay	(Russia) Alisa Oktiabreva	6–3, 3–6, 4–6
Win	12–8	Apr 2025	ITF Sharm El Sheikh	W35	Hard	(Spain) Eva Guerrero Álvarez	6–3, 6–4
Loss	12–9	May 2025	ITF Bol, Croatia	W35	Clay	(Italy) Giorgia Pedone	6–1, 4–6, 6–7^{(7)}
Loss	12–10	Jun 2025	ITF Klosters, Switzerland	W35	Clay	(Germany) Katharina Hobgarski	2–6, 6–7^{(2)}
Win	13–10	Jul 2025	ITF Monastir, Tunisia	W35	Hard	(Japan) Sakura Hosogi	6–2, 3–6, 6–4
Win	14–10	Jan 2026	ITF Monastir, Tunisia	W50	Hard	(Italy) Samira de Stefano	7–5, 2–6, 6–3
Loss	14–11	Sep 2026	ITF Évora, Portugal	W50	Hard	(Portugal) Matilde Jorge	5–7, 4–6

=== Doubles: 21 (7 titles, 14 runner-ups) ===
Legend
W60 tournaments
W40/50 tournaments
W25/35 tournaments
W10/15 tournaments

Result	W–L	Date	Tournament	Tier	Surface	Partner	Opponents	Score
Loss	0–1	Jul 2015	ITF Telavi, Georgia	10,000	Clay	(Russia) Adeliya Zabirova	(Armenia) Ani Amiraghyan (China) Chen Chaoyi	3–6, 0–6
Loss	0–2	Apr 2016	ITF Antalya, Turkey	10,000	Hard	(Georgia (country)) Ana Shanidze	(United Kingdom) Emily Arbuthnott (United Kingdom) Harriet Dart	1–6, 0–6
Loss	0–3	May 2016	ITF Goyang, South Korea	25,000	Hard	(Australia) Maddison Inglis	(United Kingdom) Freya Christie (United Kingdom) Harriet Dart	3–6, 2–6
Win	1–3	Dec 2016	ITF Solapur, India	10,000	Hard	(Belarus) Sviatlana Pirazhenka	(Egypt) Ola Abou Zekry (Russia) Anastasia Pribylova	6–4, 7–5
Loss	1–4	Apr 2017	ITF Shymkent, Kazakhstan	15,000	Clay	(Russia) Anastasia Pribylova	(Belarus) Ilona Kremen (Russia) Yana Sizikova	4–6, 1–6
Loss	1–5	Apr 2018	ITF Karshi, Uzbekistan	25,000	Hard	(Russia) Ekaterina Yashina	(Uzbekistan) Nigina Abduraimova (Russia) Anastasia Frolova	6–7^{(7)}, 1–6
Loss	1–6	Jun 2018	ITF Andijan, Uzbekistan	25,000	Hard	(Russia) Ekaterina Yashina	(Belarus) Ilona Kremen (Belarus) Iryna Shymanovich	4–6, 4–6
Win	2–6	Jun 2018	ITF Namangan, Uzbekistan	25,000	Hard	(Russia) Ekaterina Yashina	(Russia) Anna Morgina (Bulgaria) Julia Terziyska	6–3, 6–1
Loss	2–7	Sep 2019	ITF Penza, Russia	W25+H	Hard	(Ukraine) Ganna Poznikhirenko	(Russia) Vlada Koval (Russia) Kamilla Rakhimova	0–6, 3–6
Loss	2–8	Sep 2019	Meitar Open, Israel	W60	Hard	(Ukraine) Valeriya Strakhova	(Russia) Sofya Lansere (Russia) Kamilla Rakhimova	6–4, 4–6, [3–10]
Loss	2–9	Nov 2020	ITF Sharm El Sheikh, Egypt	W15	Hard	(Ukraine) Valeriya Strakhova	(Russia) Ksenia Laskutova (Russia) Daria Mishina	7–5, 6–7^{(6)}, [4–10]
Win	3–9	Sep 2021	Collonge-Bellerive Open, Switzerland	W60	Clay	(Russia) Amina Anshba	(France) Amandine Hesse (Germany) Tatjana Maria	6–1, 6–7^{(6)}, [10–8]
Win	4–9	Apr 2023	ITF Pula, Italy	W25	Clay	(Croatia) Mariana Dražić	(Kazakhstan) Zhibek Kulambayeva (Greece) Sapfo Sakellaridi	7–5, 6–4
Win	5–9	Jun 2023	ITF La Marsa, Tunisia	W25	Hard	(Russia) Ekaterina Yashina	(Bulgaria) Isabella Shinikova (China) Wei Sijia	7–5, 6–7^{(1)}, [11–9]
Loss	5–10	Aug 2023	ITF Trieste, Italy	W25	Clay	(Croatia) Mariana Dražić	(Slovenia) Nika Radišić (Bosnia and Herzegovina) Anita Wagner	1–6, 1–6
Loss	5–11	Oct 2023	ITF Kuršumlijska Banja, Serbia	W40	Clay	(Russia) Ekaterina Makarova	(Australia) Astra Sharma (Ukraine) Valeriya Strakhova	1–6, 4–6
Win	6–11	Jun 2024	ITF Monastir, Tunisia	W15	Hard	(Kyrgyzstan) Vladislava Andreevskaya	(Australia) Ella Simmons (Indonesia) Janice Tjen	6–2, 6–4
Win	7–11	Jul 2024	President's Cup, Kazakhstan	W35	Hard	(Russia) Ekaterina Shalimova	(Russia) Vitalia Diatchenko (Kazakhstan) Zhanel Rustemova	7–6^{(4)}, 2–6, [10–7]
Loss	7–12	Oct 2024	ITF Sharm El Sheikh, Egypt	W15	Hard	(Russia) Daria Egorova	(Poland) Zuzanna Pawlikowska (Egypt) Sandra Samir	3–6, 4–6
Loss	7–13	Jan 2025	ITF La Marsa, Tunisia	W50	Hard	(Russia) Anastasia Zolotareva	(China) Xiao Zhenghua (China) Yuan Chengyiyi	6–2, 5–7, [8–10]
Loss	7–14	May 2025	ITF Bol, Croatia	W35	Clay	(Croatia) Mariana Dražić	(Romania) Ilinca Amariei (Brazil) Ana Candiotto	6–7^{(7)}, 2–6

== Head-to-head records ==
=== Top 10 wins ===
Season	2021	Total
Wins	1	1

#	Player	Rank	Event	Surface	Rd	Score	AGR
2021
1.	(Czech Republic) Karolína Plíšková	No. 6	Abu Dhabi Open, UAE	Hard	2R	6–2, 6–4	No. 290
