= Fanny Östlund =

Swedish tennis player

- Country (sports): Sweden
- Born: 5 May 1997 (age 28)
- Plays: Right-handed (two-handed backhand)
- Prize money: $104,094

Singles
- Career record: 263–203
- Career titles: 4 ITF
- Highest ranking: No. 360 (5 February 2024)
- Current ranking: No. 493 (28 October 2024)

Doubles
- Career record: 202–150
- Career titles: 16 ITF
- Highest ranking: No. 210 (1 January 2024)
- Current ranking: No. 344 (28 October 2024)
- Last updated on: 28 October 2024.

Fanny Östlund (born 5 May 1997) is a Swedish tennis player.

Östlund has a career-high singles ranking by the Women's Tennis Association (WTA) of 360, achieved on 5 February 2024. She also has a career-high WTA doubles ranking of 210, achieved on 1 January 2024. She has won four singles and sixteen doubles titles on the ITF Circuit.

Östlund has competed for Sweden in the Billie Jean King Cup, where she has a win/loss record of 0–1.

== ITF Circuit finals ==
=== Singles: 9 (4 titles, 5 runner-ups) ===
Legend W35 tournaments (1–0) W10/15 tournaments (3–5)	Finals by surface Hard (1–3) Clay (3–2)

Result	W–L	Date	Tournament	Tier	Surface	Opponent	Score
Loss	0–1	Sep 2015	ITF Antalya, Turkey	W10	Hard	(Russia) Ksenia Gaydarzhi	6–7^{(3)}, 1–6
Loss	0–2	Oct 2015	ITF Heraklion, Greece	W10	Hard	(Turkey) Pemra Özgen	0–6, 1–6
Win	1–2	Sep 2016	ITF Hammamet, Tunisia	W10	Clay	(Croatia) Ana Savić	6–4, 6–2
Loss	1–3	Aug 2017	ITF Las Palmas, Spain	W15	Clay	(Netherlands) Chayenne Ewijk	6–4, 4–6, 2–6
Win	2–3	Sep 2017	ITF Antalya, Turkey	W15	Clay	(Russia) Amina Anshba	6–3, 6–1
Loss	2–4	Jun 2019	ITF Tabarka, Tunisia	W15	Clay	(Italy) Anna Turati	2–6, 1–6
Win	3–4	Sep 2019	ITF Cairo, Egypt	W15	Clay	(Egypt) Sandra Samir	6–3, 6–4
Loss	3–5	Oct 2019	ITF Stockholm, Sweden	W15	Hard	(France) Julie Gervais	1–6, 3–6
Win	4–5	Jan 2024	ITF Petit-Bourg, Guadeloupe, France	W35	Hard	(United States) Maria Mateas	4–6, 6–4, 6–3

=== Doubles: 28 (16 titles, 12 runner-ups) ===
Legend W40 tournaments (0–2) W25/35 tournaments (6–4) W10/15 tournaments (10–6)	Finals by surface Hard (5–4) Clay (11–8)

Result	W–L	Date	Tournament	Tier	Surface	Partner	Opponents	Score
Loss	0–1	Sep 2015	ITF Antalya, Turkey	W10	Hard	(Paraguay) Sara Giménez	(Sweden) Jacqueline Cabaj Awad (Sweden) Kajsa Rinaldo Persson	3–6, 4–6
Loss	0–2	Apr 2017	ITF Hammamet, Tunisia	W15	Clay	(Chile) Fernanda Brito	(United Kingdom) Maia Lumsden (Hungary) Panna Udvardy	4–6, 7–5, [4–10]
Win	1–2	Jul 2017	ITF Lund, Sweden	W25	Clay	(Sweden) Ida Jarlskog	(Romania) Laura Ioana Andrei (Germany) Julia Wachaczyk	6–2, 6–7^{(4)}, [14–12]
Win	2–2	Sep 2017	ITF Antalya, Turkey	W15	Clay	(Bosnia and Herzegovina) Jasmina Tinjić	(Russia) Anna Iakovleva (Ukraine) Gyulnara Nazarova	6–1, 6–2
Loss	2–3	Oct 2017	ITF Jounieh, Lebanon	W15	Clay	(Sweden) Jacqueline Cabaj Awad	(Egypt) Ola Abou Zekry (Turkey) Berfu Cengiz	4–6, 5–7
Loss	2–4	Oct 2017	ITF Stockholm, Sweden	W15	Hard	(Norway) Malene Helgø	(Russia) Anastasia Kulikova (Estonia) Elena Malõgina	2–6, 5–7
Win	3–4	Nov 2017	ITF Stockholm, Sweden	W15	Hard	(Norway) Malene Helgø	(Ukraine) Maryna Kolb (Ukraine) Nadiya Kolb	w/o
Win	4–4	Mar 2018	ITF Antalya, Turkey	W15	Clay	(Romania) Andreea Roșca	(Romania) Ilona Georgiana Ghioroaie (France) Victoria Muntean	6–3, 4–6, [10–7]
Loss	4–5	Feb 2019	ITF Antalya, Turkey	W15	Clay	(Russia) Anna Ureke	(Romania) Karola Bejenaru (Romania) Ioana Gașpar	4–6, 3–6
Win	5–5	Jun 2019	ITF Tabarka, Tunisia	W15	Clay	(Sweden) Alexandra Viktorovitch	(Argentina) Martina Capurro Taborda (Italy) Anna Turati	6–3, 2–6, [10–8]
Win	6–5	Sep 2019	ITF Cairo, Egypt	W15	Clay	(Serbia) Bojana Marinković	(Australia) Yasmina El Sayed (Russia) Daria Solovyeva	6–3, 6–1
Win	7–5	Oct 2019	ITF Stockholm, Sweden	W15	Hard	(Russia) Alina Silich	(Sweden) Jacqueline Cabaj Awad (Finland) Oona Orpana	6–3, 6–2
Win	8–5	Mar 2020	ITF Heraklion, Greece	W15	Clay	(Serbia) Tamara Čurović	(Romania) Ioana Gașpar (Spain) Rebeka Masarova	6–4, 7–5
Loss	8–6	Jan 2021	ITF Cairo, Egypt	W15	Clay	(Egypt) Sandra Samir	(United States) Anastasia Nefedova (Netherlands) Lexie Stevens	1–6, 4–6
Loss	8–7	Oct 2021	ITF Netanya, Israel	W25	Hard	(Czech Republic) Linda Nosková	(Israel) Lina Glushko (Israel) Shavit Kimchi	4–6, 2–6
Loss	8–8	Jan 2022	ITF Monastir, Tunisia	W25	Hard	(Russia) Ksenia Laskutova	(Hong Kong) Eudice Chong (Hong Kong) Cody Wong	6–7^{(3)}, 6–7^{(8)}
Loss	8–9	May 2022	ITF Båstad, Sweden	W25	Clay	(France) Julie Belgraver	(Germany) Mona Barthel (Sweden) Caijsa Hennemann	1–6, 4–6
Win	9–9	Jan 2023	ITF Fort-de-France, Martinique	W15	Hard	(Switzerland) Jenny Dürst	(Canada) Bianca Fernandez (United States) Anna Ulyashchenko	6–4, 3–6, [10–4]
Win	10–9	Jan 2023	ITF Petit-Bourg, Guadeloupe	W25	Hard	(Switzerland) Jenny Dürst	(United States) Clervie Ngounoue (Denmark) Johanne Svendsen	6–4, 6–3
Win	11–9	Feb 2023	ITF Jhajjar, India	W15	Clay	(Sweden) Vanessa Ersöz	(Romania) Alexandra Iordache (Uzbekistan) Sevil Yuldasheva	0–6, 7–5, [10–5]
Win	12–9	Feb 2023	ITF Jhajjar, India	W15	Clay	(Latvia) Diāna Marcinkēviča	(India) Vaidehi Chaudhari (India) Zeel Desai	6–2, 6–1
Win	13–9	Apr 2023	ITF Bujumbura, Burundi	W25	Clay	Ksenia Laskutova	(Netherlands) Jasmijn Gimbrère (Germany) Jasmin Jebawy	6–4, 6–3
Loss	13–10	Apr 2023	ITF Bujumbura, Burundi	W25	Clay	Ksenia Laskutova	(Netherlands) Jasmijn Gimbrère (Germany) Jasmin Jebawy	3–6, 4–6
Win	14–10	Apr 2023	ITF Båstad, Sweden	W25	Clay	(Switzerland) Jenny Dürst	(Poland) Martyna Kubka (Kazakhstan) Zhibek Kulambayeva	6–4, 6–7^{(3)}, [10–7]
Loss	14–11	Jun 2023	ITF Ystad, Sweden	W40	Clay	(Switzerland) Jenny Dürst	(Australia) Astra Sharma (Ukraine) Valeriya Strakhova	6–4, 6–7^{(3)}, [9–11]
Loss	14–12	Nov 2023	ITF Guadalajara, Mexico	W40	Clay	Veronika Miroshnichenko	(United States) Haley Giavara (Canada) Layne Sleeth	4–6, 3–6
Win	15–12	Dec 2023	ITF Nairobi, Kenya	W25	Clay	(Ukraine) Valeriya Strakhova	(Japan) Nagomi Higashitani (Kenya) Angella Okutoyi	6–4, 7–6^{(5)}
Win	16–12	Jan 2024	ITF Petit-Bourg, Guadeloupe, France	W35	Hard	(Switzerland) Jenny Dürst	(Germany) Sina Herrmann (Germany) Antonia Schmidt	6–2, 7–5
