= Jacqueline Cabaj Awad =

Swedish tennis player

Jacqueline Cabaj Awad جاكلين كابي عوض
- Country (sports): Sweden
- Born: 28 January 1996 (age 30) Eskilstuna, Sweden
- Retired: 2025 (last match played)
- Plays: Right-handed (two-handed backhand)
- Prize money: $146,774

Singles
- Career record: 348–269
- Career titles: 10 ITF
- Highest ranking: No. 387 (10 June 2024)

Doubles
- Career record: 214–157
- Career titles: 15 ITF
- Highest ranking: No. 247 (31 October 2022)

Team competitions
- Fed Cup: 9–16 (doubles 8–8)
- Last updated on: 27 November 2026.

Jacqueline Cabaj Awad (Arabic: جاكلين كابي عوض; born 28 January 1996) is a Swedish former tennis player.

She has won ten singles and fifteen doubles titles on the ITF Women's Circuit. On 10 June 2024, she achieved her best singles ranking of world No. 387. On 31 October 2023, she peaked at No. 247 in the WTA doubles rankings.

Cabaj Awad made her WTA Tour debut at the 2013 Swedish Open, having received a wildcard with Cornelia Lister into the doubles draw. They lost to Marina Melnikova and Ksenia Palkina in the first round.

Playing for Sweden in the Billie Jean King Cup, she has posted a win-loss record of 9–16 (as of May 2024).

== ITF Circuit finals ==
=== Singles: 18 (10 titles, 8 runner-ups) ===
Legend W25/35 tournaments W10/15 tournaments	Finals by surface Hard (10–5) Carpet (0–3)

Result	W–L	Date	Tournament	Tier	Surface	Opponents	Score
Win	1–0	May 2015	ITF Sharm El Sheikh, Egypt	W10	Hard	(Italy) Alice Matteucci	4–6, 6–1, 6–3
Loss	1–1	Jun 2015	ITF Sharm El Sheikh, Egypt	W10	Hard	(Egypt) Ola Abou Zekry	1–6, 6–1, 3–6
Win	2–1	Oct 2015	ITF Sharm El Sheikh, Egypt	W10	Hard	(United Kingdom) Freya Christie	2–6, 7–6^{(5)}, 6–4
Win	3–1	Jul 2016	ITF Sharm El Sheikh, Egypt	W10	Hard	(Romania) Ioana Diana Pietroiu	7–6^{(2)}, 6–4
Loss	3–2	Sep 2016	ITF Madrid, Spain	W10	Hard	(Spain) Nuria Párrizas Díaz	6–7^{(5)}, 3–6
Win	4–2	Nov 2016	ITF Oslo, Norway	W10	Hard (i)	(United Kingdom) Amanda Carreras	6–3, 6–3
Win	5–2	Jul 2017	ITF Sharm El Sheikh, Egypt	W15	Hard	(Japan) Ramu Ueda	4–6, 6–3, 6–1
Win	6–2	Jul 2017	ITF Sharm El Sheikh, Egypt	W15	Hard	(Egypt) Mayar Sherif	6–7^{(4)}, 7–5, 6–4
Win	7–2	Oct 2017	ITF Stockholm, Sweden	W15	Hard (i)	(Denmark) Clara Tauson	6–4, 6–0
Win	8–2	Oct 2018	ITF Sharm El Sheikh, Egypt	W15	Hard	(Egypt) Lamis Alhussein Abdel Aziz	7–5, 6–3
Loss	8–3	Nov 2018	ITF Stockholm, Sweden	W15	Hard (i)	(Finland) Anastasia Kulikova	7–6^{(5)}, 2–6, 4–6
Win	9–3	Nov 2018	ITF Monastir, Tunisia	W15	Hard	(United States) Sarah Lee	5–7, 6–3, 6–4
Loss	9–4	Nov 2021	ITF Solarino, Italy	W15	Carpet	(Italy) Melania Delai	6–7^{(3)}, 3–6
Loss	9–5	Sep 2022	ITF Sharm El Sheikh, Egypt	W15	Hard	Polina Iatcenko	6–7^{(6)}, 2–6
Loss	9–6	Nov 2022	ITF Solarino, Italy	W15	Carpet	(Italy) Maria Vittoria Viviani	5–7, 6–0, 3–6
Loss	9–7	Nov 2022	ITF Solarino, Italy	W15	Carpet	(Italy) Federica Bilardo	4–6, 6–4, 3–6
Win	10–7	May 2024	ITF Estepona, Spain	W15	Hard	(United Kingdom) Alice Gillan	6–2, 6–4
Loss	10–8	Sep 2024	ITF Sharm El Sheikh, Egypt	W15	Hard	(Georgia (country)) Zoziya Kardava	6–2, 5–7, 2–6

=== Doubles: 39 (15 titles, 24 runner-ups) ===
Legend W60 tournaments W25/35 tournaments W10/15 tournaments	Finals by surface Hard (11–16) Clay (4–7) Carpet (0–1)

Result	W–L	Date	Tournament	Tier	Surface	Partner	Opponents	Score
Win	1–0	Jul 2013	ITF Getxo, Spain	W10	Clay	(Sweden) Cornelia Lister	(Australia) Ashley Keir (Ecuador) Charlotte Römer	6–2, 6–4
Win	2–0	Sep 2015	ITF Antalya, Turkey	W10	Hard	(Sweden) Kajsa Rinaldo Persson	(Paraguay) Sara Gimenez (Sweden) Fanny Östlund	6–3, 6–4
Loss	2–1	Oct 2015	ITF Sharm El Sheikh, Egypt	W10	Hard	(Czech Republic) Martina Pradová	(Russia) Varvara Flink (Russia) Veronika Miroshnichenko	3–6, 4–6
Loss	2–2	Feb 2016	ITF Sharm El Sheikh, Egypt	W10	Hard	(Ukraine) Veronika Kapshay	(Romania) Elena-Teodora Cadar (Romania) Oana Georgeta Simion	3–6, 2–6
Loss	2–3	May 2016	ITF Warsaw, Poland	W10	Clay	(Italy) Deborah Chiesa	(Finland) Emma Laine (United States) Sabrina Santamaria	6–7^{(6)}, 0–6
Win	3–3	Jul 2016	ITF Sharm El Sheikh, Egypt	W10	Hard	(Montenegro) Ana Veselinović	(Ukraine) Kateryna Sliusar (India) Dhruthi Tatachar Venugopal	6–4, 6–1
Win	4–3	Aug 2016	ITF Las Palmas, Spain	W10	Clay	(France) Marine Partaud	(Spain) Yvonne Cavallé Reimers (Ecuador) Charlotte Römer	1–6, 7–5, [10–8]
Win	5–3	Oct 2016	ITF Sharm El Sheikh, Egypt	W10	Hard	(Romania) Jaqueline Adina Cristian	(Ukraine) Alona Fomina (Russia) Anna Morgina	6–3, 7–5
Win	6–3	Apr 2017	ITF Antalya, Turkey	W15	Hard	(France) Margot Yerolymos	(Russia) Amina Anshba (Netherlands) Nina Kruijer	7–6^{(5)}, 4–6, [10–8]
Loss	6–4	Sep 2017	ITF Jounieh Open, Lebanon	W15	Clay	(Sweden) Fanny Östlund	(Egypt) Ola Abou Zekry (Turkey) Berfu Cengiz	4–6, 5–7
Loss	6–5	Mar 2018	ITF Sharm El Sheikh, Egypt	W15	Hard	(United Kingdom) Jodie Burrage	(Thailand) Kamonwan Buayam (Russia) Angelina Gabueva	5–7, 7–5, [7–10]
Win	7–5	Jun 2018	ITF Guimaraes, Portugal	W15	Hard	(Romania) Karola Patricia Bejenaru	(India) Zeel Desai (Romania) Cristina Ene	6–1, 6–0
Loss	7–6	Jan 2019	ITF Sharm El Sheikh, Egypt	W15	Hard	(Switzerland) Fiona Ganz	(Belgium) Magali Kempen (Austria) Melanie Klaffner	4–6, 1–6
Win	8–6	Mar 2019	ITF Sharm El Sheikh, Egypt	W15	Hard	(Turkey) İpek Soylu	(Kazakhstan) Gozal Ainitdinova (Russia) Ekaterina Kazionova	6–2, 6–4
Loss	8–7	Jul 2019	ITF Porto, Portugal	W25	Hard	(Portugal) Inês Murta	(France) Estelle Cascino (Bulgaria) Julia Terziyska	6–7^{(0)}, 3–6
Win	9–7	Sep 2019	Batumi Open, Georgia	W15	Hard	(Turkey) Melis Sezer	(Poland) Weronika Falkowska (Poland) Paulina Jastrzębska	7–6^{(3)}, 6–3
Loss	9–8	Oct 2019	ITF Stockholm, Sweden	W15	Hard (i)	(Finland) Oona Orpana	(Sweden) Fanny Östlund (Russia) Alina Silich	3–6, 2–6
Loss	9–9	Nov 2019	ITF Stockholm, Sweden	W15	Hard (i)	(Finland) Oona Orpana	(Latvia) Margarita Ignatjeva (Russia) Ekaterina Kazionova	6–2, 6–7^{(5)}, [4–10]
Win	10–9	Mar 2020	ITF Cairo, Egypt	W15	Hard	(Egypt) Sandra Samir	(India) Zeel Desai (Poland) Stefania Rogozińska Dzik	7–5, 6–2
Loss	10–10	Sep 2020	ITF Figueira da Foz, Portugal	W25	Hard	(Portugal) Inês Murta	(Brazil) Ingrid Martins (Brazil) Beatriz Haddad Maia	5–7, 1–6
Loss	10–11	Mar 2021	ITF Monastir, Tunisia	W15	Hard	(Netherlands) Suzan Lamens	(Netherlands) Merel Hoedt (Belgium) Eliessa Vanlangendonck	2–6, 6–2, [5–10]
Loss	10–12	May 2021	ITF Salinas, Ecuador	W25	Hard	(Portugal) Francisca Jorge	(United Kingdom) Jodie Burrage (New Zealand) Paige Hourigan	2–6, 6–2, [8–10]
Loss	10–13	Jun 2021	ITF Jönköping, Sweden	W25	Hard	(France) Carole Monnet	(Italy) Cristiana Ferrando (Romania) Oana Georgeta Simion	5–7, 4–6
Loss	10–14	Nov 2021	ITF Solarino, Italy	W15	Carpet	(Australia) Alicia Smith	(Italy) Virginia Ferrara (Italy) Giorgia Pedone	1-6, 6–1, [5–10]
Win	11–14	Feb 2022	ITF Cancún, Mexico	W15	Hard	(Portugal) Ana Filipa Santos	(France) Astrid Cirotte (Russia) Anastasia Sysoeva	6–4, 6–3
Loss	11–15	Feb 2022	ITF Cancún, Mexico	W25	Hard	(Israel) Lina Glushko	(Ukraine) Kateryna Volodko (Canada) Carol Zhao	5–7, 7–6^{(5)}, [7–10]
Win	12–15	May 2022	ITF Varberg, Sweden	W25	Clay	(Sweden) Caijsa Hennemann	(Sweden) June Björk (Sweden) Julita Saner	6–1, 6–3
Loss	12–16	Jun 2022	ITF Madrid, Spain	W25	Hard	Valeria Savinykh	(Spain) Yvonne Cavallé Reimers (Spain) Guiomar Maristany	4–6, 4–6
Loss	12–17	Aug 2022	ITF Agadir, Morocco	W25	Clay	(Italy) Martina Colmegna	(Italy) Angelica Moratelli (Italy) Aurora Zantedeschi	2–6, 6–4, [7–10]
Win	13–17	Aug 2022	ITF Oldenzaal, Netherlands	W25	Clay	(Sweden) Caijsa Hennemann	(Netherlands) Rikke de Koning (Netherlands) Marente Sijbesma	6–1, 6–3
Loss	13–18	Sep 2022	Collonge-Bellerive Open, Switzerland	W60	Clay	(Czech Republic) Michaela Bayerlová	(Switzerland) Jenny Dürst (Poland) Weronika Falkowska	6–7^{(5)}, 1–6
Loss	13–19	Mar 2023	ITF Antalya, Turkey	W15	Clay	(Greece) Martha Matoula	(Kazakhstan) Zhibek Kulambayeva; Daria Lodikova	1–6, 4–6
Loss	13–20	Aug 2023	ITF Malmö, Sweden	W25	Clay	(Sweden) Lisa Zaar	(Netherlands) Suzan Lamens (Netherlands) Lexie Stevens	4–6, 1–6
Loss	13–21	Nov 2023	ITF Santo Domingo, Dominican Rep.	W25	Hard	(Mexico) Fernanda Navarro	(Serbia) Katarina Jokić (United States) Taylor Ng	walkover
Loss	13–22	Feb 2024	ITF Gurugram, India	W35	Hard	(Lithuania) Justina Mikulskytė	(Kazakhstan) Zhibek Kulambayeva (India) Ankita Raina	4–6, 2–6
Loss	13–23	May 2024	ITF Båstad, Sweden	W35	Clay	(Sweden) Caijsa Hennemann	(Sweden) Linea Bajraliu (Sweden) Bella Bergkvist Larsson	6–4, 2–6, [2–10]
Win	14–23	May 2024	ITF Estepona, Spain	W15	Hard	(Luxembourg) Marie Weckerle	(Kazakhstan) Gozal Ainitdinova; Elina Nepliy	6–4, 6–4
Win	15–23	Sep 2024	ITF Sharm El Sheikh, Egypt	W15	Hard	(Egypt) Sandra Samir	(Slovakia) Salma Drugdová (Romania) Briana Szabó	6–4, 6–0
Loss	15–24	Oct 2024	ITF Istanbul, Turkey	W35	Hard (i)	(Croatia) Iva Primorac	(Latvia) Kamilla Bartone (Romania) Andreea Prisăcariu	4–6, 2–6
