= 2025 ITF Women's World Tennis Tour (April–June) =

The 2025 ITF Women's World Tennis Tour is the 2025 edition of the second-tier tour for women's professional tennis. It is organised by the International Tennis Federation and is a tier below the WTA Tour. The ITF Women's World Tennis Tour includes tournaments in five categories with prize money ranging from $15,000 up to $100,000.

== Key ==
Category
W100 tournaments ($100,000)
W75 tournaments ($60,000)
W50 tournaments ($40,000)
W35 tournaments ($30,000)
W15 tournaments ($15,000)

=== April ===
Week of	Tournament	Winner	Runners-up	Semifinalists	Quarterfinalists
April 7	Zaragoza Open; Zaragoza, Spain; Clay; W100; Singles – Doubles	Anastasia Zakharova; 6–3, 6–1	(Spain) Kaitlin Quevedo	(Czech Republic) Barbora Palicová (Australia) Olivia Gadecki	Alina Charaeva (Germany) Tamara Korpatsch (United States) Varvara Lepchenko (Czech Republic) Anna Sisková
April 7	Zaragoza Open; Zaragoza, Spain; Clay; W100; Singles – Doubles	(Australia) Olivia Gadecki (Indonesia) Aldila Sutjiadi; 6–4, 6–3	(Spain) Aliona Bolsova (Spain) Ángela Fita Boluda	(Czech Republic) Barbora Palicová (Australia) Olivia Gadecki	Alina Charaeva (Germany) Tamara Korpatsch (United States) Varvara Lepchenko (Czech Republic) Anna Sisková
April 7	Bellinzona Ladies Open; Bellinzona, Switzerland; Clay; W75; Singles and doubles draws	(Argentina) Solana Sierra; 6–4, 6–0	(Italy) Silvia Ambrosio	(United States) Tyra Caterina Grant (France) Loïs Boisson	(Argentina) María Lourdes Carlé (Italy) Camilla Rosatello (Czech Republic) Aneta Kučmová (Belgium) Marie Benoit
April 7	Bellinzona Ladies Open; Bellinzona, Switzerland; Clay; W75; Singles and doubles draws	(Czech Republic) Aneta Kučmová (Greece) Sapfo Sakellaridi; 7–6^{(7–3)}, 3–6, [10–2]	(Switzerland) Jenny Dürst (United States) Elizabeth Mandlik	(United States) Tyra Caterina Grant (France) Loïs Boisson	(Argentina) María Lourdes Carlé (Italy) Camilla Rosatello (Czech Republic) Aneta Kučmová (Belgium) Marie Benoit
April 7	Osaka, Japan; Hard; W35; Singles and doubles draws	(China) Ma Yexin; 6–4, 4–6, 6–4	(Chinese Taipei) Liang En-shuo	(Indonesia) Janice Tjen (Japan) Miho Kuramochi	(Japan) Eri Shimizu (South Korea) Ku Yeon-woo (Japan) Haruka Kaji (China) Guo Hanyu
April 7	Osaka, Japan; Hard; W35; Singles and doubles draws	(Japan) Momoko Kobori (Japan) Ayano Shimizu; 6–4, 7–5	(South Korea) Ku Yeon-woo (Indonesia) Janice Tjen	(Indonesia) Janice Tjen (Japan) Miho Kuramochi	(Japan) Eri Shimizu (South Korea) Ku Yeon-woo (Japan) Haruka Kaji (China) Guo Hanyu
April 7	Santa Margherita di Pula, Italy; Clay; W35; Singles and doubles draws	(Ukraine) Anastasiia Sobolieva; 6–0, 3–6, 6–2	(France) Emma Léné	(Finland) Laura Hietaranta (Germany) Antonia Schmidt	(Bulgaria) Elizara Yaneva (Romania) Patricia Maria Țig (Italy) Alessandra Mazzola (France) Sarah Iliev
April 7	Santa Margherita di Pula, Italy; Clay; W35; Singles and doubles draws	(Japan) Hikaru Sato (Japan) Ikumi Yamazaki; 7–6^{(7–4)}, 1–6, [12–10]	(Germany) Katharina Hobgarski (Germany) Antonia Schmidt	(Finland) Laura Hietaranta (Germany) Antonia Schmidt	(Bulgaria) Elizara Yaneva (Romania) Patricia Maria Țig (Italy) Alessandra Mazzola (France) Sarah Iliev
April 7	São Paulo, Brazil; Clay; W35; Singles and doubles draws	(Italy) Miriana Tona; 7–5, 6–4	(Brazil) Carolina Alves	(Ukraine) Valeriya Strakhova (Brazil) Thaísa Grana Pedretti	(Brazil) Gabriela Cé (Czech Republic) Michaela Bayerlová (Bolivia) Noelia Zeballos; Maria Kozyreva
April 7	São Paulo, Brazil; Clay; W35; Singles and doubles draws	(Poland) Anna Hertel (Bulgaria) Gergana Topalova; 5–7, 6–1, [10–6]	(Brazil) Carolina Bohrer Martins (United States) Lilian Poling	(Ukraine) Valeriya Strakhova (Brazil) Thaísa Grana Pedretti	(Brazil) Gabriela Cé (Czech Republic) Michaela Bayerlová (Bolivia) Noelia Zeballos; Maria Kozyreva
April 7	Boca Raton, United States; Clay; W35; Singles and doubles draws	(United States) Whitney Osuigwe; 6–4, 6–3	(United States) Akasha Urhobo	Iryna Shymanovich (United States) Jamie Loeb	(Italy) Diletta Cherubini (United States) Jada Robinson (Mexico) María Portillo Ramírez (Japan) Mei Yamaguchi
April 7	Boca Raton, United States; Clay; W35; Singles and doubles draws	(United States) Rasheeda McAdoo (United States) Akasha Urhobo; 5–7, 7–6^{(7–3)}, [10–7]	(United States) Victoria Osuigwe (United States) Alana Smith	Iryna Shymanovich (United States) Jamie Loeb	(Italy) Diletta Cherubini (United States) Jada Robinson (Mexico) María Portillo Ramírez (Japan) Mei Yamaguchi
April 7	Wuning, China; Hard; W15; Singles and doubles draws	(China) Ren Yufei; 6–2, 6–4	(China) Lu Jingjing	(Indonesia) Priska Nugroho (China) Guo Meiqi	(South Korea) Cherry Kim (Slovakia) Viktória Morvayová (Japan) Mayuka Aikawa (China) Xu Jiayu
April 7	Wuning, China; Hard; W15; Singles and doubles draws	(South Korea) Kim Na-ri (China) Ye Qiuyu; 6–2, 7–5	(Slovakia) Viktória Morvayová (China) Ren Yufei	(Indonesia) Priska Nugroho (China) Guo Meiqi	(South Korea) Cherry Kim (Slovakia) Viktória Morvayová (Japan) Mayuka Aikawa (China) Xu Jiayu
April 7	Antalya, Turkiye; Clay; W15; Singles and doubles draws	(Germany) Sonja Zhenikhova; 6–1, 4–6, 6–3	(Italy) Gaia Maduzzi	Diana Demidova (Germany) Ida Wobker	(China) Han Jiangxue (Germany) Phillippa Preugschat (Spain) Sara Dols (Argentina) Justina María González Daniele
April 7	Antalya, Turkiye; Clay; W15; Singles and doubles draws	(Turkey) Defne Çırpanlı (Romania) Vanessa Popa Teiuşanu; 7–5, 6–2	(Germany) Tessa Johanna Brockmann (Germany) Phillippa Preugschat	Diana Demidova (Germany) Ida Wobker	(China) Han Jiangxue (Germany) Phillippa Preugschat (Spain) Sara Dols (Argentina) Justina María González Daniele
April 7	Sharm El Sheikh, Egypt; Hard; W15; Singles and doubles draws	(Poland) Weronika Ewald; 3–6, 6–4, 6–0	(Luxembourg) Marie Weckerle	(United States) Carol Young Suh Lee (United Kingdom) Ranah Stoiber	(United Kingdom) Katie Swan (Kosovo) Arlinda Rushiti (Ukraine) Kateryna Lazarenko (United Kingdom) Angelica Blake
April 7	Sharm El Sheikh, Egypt; Hard; W15; Singles and doubles draws	(Kosovo) Arlinda Rushiti (Luxembourg) Marie Weckerle; 6–2, 6–3	(United Kingdom) Amelia Rajecki (United Kingdom) Ranah Stoiber	(United States) Carol Young Suh Lee (United Kingdom) Ranah Stoiber	(United Kingdom) Katie Swan (Kosovo) Arlinda Rushiti (Ukraine) Kateryna Lazarenko (United Kingdom) Angelica Blake
April 7	Monastir, Tunisia; Hard; W15; Singles and doubles draws	(Switzerland) Alina Granwehr; 7–5, 7–6^{(7–1)}	(United States) Hina Inoue	(United States) Jenna DeFalco (United States) Carolyn Ansari	Milana Zhabrailova (Slovakia) Radka Zelníčková (Italy) Lara Pfeifer (Germany) Josy Daems
April 7	Monastir, Tunisia; Hard; W15; Singles and doubles draws	(United Kingdom) Esther Adeshina (United States) Abigail Rencheli; 6–3, 6–7^{(4–7)}, [10–6]	(Germany) Josy Daems (Denmark) Vilma Krebs Hyllested	(United States) Jenna DeFalco (United States) Carolyn Ansari	Milana Zhabrailova (Slovakia) Radka Zelníčková (Italy) Lara Pfeifer (Germany) Josy Daems
April 14	Open Villa de Madrid; Madrid, Spain; Clay; W100; Singles and doubles draws	(Egypt) Mayar Sherif; 6–3, 6–4	(Mexico) Renata Zarazúa	(France) Chloé Paquet (Spain) Marina Bassols Ribera	Maria Timofeeva; Alina Charaeva (Spain) Andrea Lázaro García (Germany) Tamara Korpatsch
April 14	Open Villa de Madrid; Madrid, Spain; Clay; W100; Singles and doubles draws	(Italy) Nicole Fossa Huergo (Kazakhstan) Zhibek Kulambayeva; 7–6^{(9–7)}, 6–7^{(4–7)}, [10–7]	(Spain) Marina Bassols Ribera (Spain) Andrea Lázaro García	(France) Chloé Paquet (Spain) Marina Bassols Ribera	Maria Timofeeva; Alina Charaeva (Spain) Andrea Lázaro García (Germany) Tamara Korpatsch
April 14	Calvi, France; Hard; W75; Singles and doubles draws	(Belgium) Sofia Costoulas; 7–5, 6–1	(France) Tessah Andrianjafitrimo	(Germany) Anna-Lena Friedsam (Switzerland) Valentina Ryser	(Ukraine) Daria Snigur (Poland) Linda Klimovičová (Israel) Lina Glushko (United States) Emina Bektas
April 14	Calvi, France; Hard; W75; Singles and doubles draws	(Bulgaria) Lia Karatancheva (Sweden) Lisa Zaar; 6–4, 6–3	(India) Riya Bhatia (Burundi) Sada Nahimana	(Germany) Anna-Lena Friedsam (Switzerland) Valentina Ryser	(Ukraine) Daria Snigur (Poland) Linda Klimovičová (Israel) Lina Glushko (United States) Emina Bektas
April 14	Koper Open; Koper, Slovenia; Clay; W75; Singles and doubles draws	(Austria) Julia Grabher; 6–2, 6–2	(Georgia (country)) Ekaterine Gorgodze	(Netherlands) Arantxa Rus (Italy) Silvia Ambrosio	(Ukraine) Oleksandra Oliynykova (Croatia) Petra Marčinko (Cyprus) Raluca Șerban (France) Carole Monnet
April 14	Koper Open; Koper, Slovenia; Clay; W75; Singles and doubles draws	(Slovenia) Kristina Novak (Czech Republic) Ivana Šebestová; 7–5, 0–6, [10–6]	Julia Avdeeva; Ekaterina Maklakova	(Netherlands) Arantxa Rus (Italy) Silvia Ambrosio	(Ukraine) Oleksandra Oliynykova (Croatia) Petra Marčinko (Cyprus) Raluca Șerban (France) Carole Monnet
April 14	Florida's Sports Coast Open; Zephyrhills, United States; Clay; W50; Singles and doubles draws	Iryna Shymanovich; 7–6^{(7–2)}, 6–0	(United States) Caty McNally	(United States) Elvina Kalieva (Canada) Katherine Sebov	(Australia) Arina Rodionova (United States) Ayana Akli (United States) Jamie Loeb (United States) Jada Robinson
April 14	Florida's Sports Coast Open; Zephyrhills, United States; Clay; W50; Singles and doubles draws	Maria Kozyreva; Iryna Shymanovich; 6–4, 6–1	(United States) Maria Mateas (United States) Alana Smith	(United States) Elvina Kalieva (Canada) Katherine Sebov	(Australia) Arina Rodionova (United States) Ayana Akli (United States) Jamie Loeb (United States) Jada Robinson
April 14	Santa Margherita di Pula, Italy; Clay; W35; Singles and doubles draws	(Finland) Laura Hietaranta; 6–1, 6–1	(France) Sarah Iliev	(Germany) Katharina Hobgarski (Bulgaria) Iva Ivanova	(France) Jenny Lim (Italy) Tatiana Pieri (Italy) Anastasia Bertacchi (France) Ksenia Efremova
April 14	Santa Margherita di Pula, Italy; Clay; W35; Singles and doubles draws	(Finland) Laura Hietaranta (United Kingdom) Ella McDonald; 6–2, 6–3	(Italy) Anastasia Bertacchi (Italy) Viola Turini	(Germany) Katharina Hobgarski (Bulgaria) Iva Ivanova	(France) Jenny Lim (Italy) Tatiana Pieri (Italy) Anastasia Bertacchi (France) Ksenia Efremova
April 14	Sharm El Sheikh, Egypt; Hard; W35; Singles and doubles draws	Polina Iatcenko; 6–2, 6–2	(Slovakia) Viktória Hrunčáková	(Japan) Haruka Kaji (United States) Carol Young Suh Lee	(Bulgaria) Isabella Shinikova (Sweden) Jacqueline Cabaj Awad (Poland) Weronika Ewald; Anastasia Gasanova
April 14	Sharm El Sheikh, Egypt; Hard; W35; Singles and doubles draws	(Slovakia) Katarína Kužmová; Mariia Tkacheva; 6–4, 6–3	Aliona Falei; Polina Iatcenko	(Japan) Haruka Kaji (United States) Carol Young Suh Lee	(Bulgaria) Isabella Shinikova (Sweden) Jacqueline Cabaj Awad (Poland) Weronika Ewald; Anastasia Gasanova
April 14	Leme, Brazil; Clay; W35; Singles and doubles draws	Alisa Oktiabreva; 6–1, 7–5	(Bulgaria) Gergana Topalova	Ekaterina Kazionova (Brazil) Carolina Alves	(Argentina) Jazmín Ortenzi (Italy) Aurora Zantedeschi (Italy) Miriana Tona (Brazil) Gabriela Cé
April 14	Leme, Brazil; Clay; W35; Singles and doubles draws	(Peru) Romina Ccuno (Chile) Fernanda Labraña; 6–2, 7–5	(Argentina) Luciana Moyano (Bolivia) Noelia Zeballos	Ekaterina Kazionova (Brazil) Carolina Alves	(Argentina) Jazmín Ortenzi (Italy) Aurora Zantedeschi (Italy) Miriana Tona (Brazil) Gabriela Cé
April 14	Wuning, China; Hard; W15; Singles and doubles draws	(China) Yang Yidi; 6–4, 6–4	(Slovakia) Viktória Morvayová	(China) Ye Qiuyu (China) Ren Yufei	(South Korea) Cherry Kim (China) Zhu Chenting; Sofya Lansere (China) Wang Jiayi
April 14	Wuning, China; Hard; W15; Singles and doubles draws	(South Korea) Kim Na-ri (China) Ye Qiuyu; 6–2, 6–4	(China) Wang Jiaqi (China) Xu Jiayu	(China) Ye Qiuyu (China) Ren Yufei	(South Korea) Cherry Kim (China) Zhu Chenting; Sofya Lansere (China) Wang Jiayi
April 14	Antalya, Turkiye; Clay; W15; Singles and doubles draws	Ekaterina Reyngold; 6–2, 6–2	(Czech Republic) Jana Kovačková	(Latvia) Adelina Lachinova (Netherlands) Isis Louise Van den Broek	(Spain) Sara Dols (Czech Republic) Sarah Melany Fajmonová (Italy) Isabella Maria Șerban (Japan) Yuki Naito
April 14	Antalya, Turkiye; Clay; W15; Singles and doubles draws	(Czech Republic) Alena Kovačková (Czech Republic) Jana Kovačková; 5–7, 6–4, [10–4]	(Romania) Ștefania Bojică (Czech Republic) Linda Ševčíková	(Latvia) Adelina Lachinova (Netherlands) Isis Louise Van den Broek	(Spain) Sara Dols (Czech Republic) Sarah Melany Fajmonová (Italy) Isabella Maria Șerban (Japan) Yuki Naito
April 14	Monastir, Tunisia; Hard; W15; Singles and doubles draws	(United States) Hina Inoue; 6–2, 6–0	(Denmark) Johanne Svendsen	(United Kingdom) Esther Adeshina (Belgium) Eliessa Vanlangendonck	(Bulgaria) Lidia Encheva (Italy) Francesca Dell'Edera (Italy) Arianna Zucchini; Milana Zhabrailova
April 14	Monastir, Tunisia; Hard; W15; Singles and doubles draws	(Denmark) Vilma Krebs Hyllested (Denmark) Johanne Svendsen; 6–0, 5–7, [10–5]	(India) Zeel Desai; Anastasiia Gureva	(United Kingdom) Esther Adeshina (Belgium) Eliessa Vanlangendonck	(Bulgaria) Lidia Encheva (Italy) Francesca Dell'Edera (Italy) Arianna Zucchini; Milana Zhabrailova
April 21	Ando Securities Open; Tokyo, Japan; Hard; W100; Singles and doubles draws	(Japan) Wakana Sonobe; 6–4, 6–7^{(1–7)}, 6–3	(Japan) Ena Shibahara	(Japan) Aoi Ito (Australia) Talia Gibson	(United Kingdom) Heather Watson (Australia) Maddison Inglis (Netherlands) Arianne Hartono (Canada) Rebecca Marino
April 21	Ando Securities Open; Tokyo, Japan; Hard; W100; Singles and doubles draws	(China) Guo Hanyu (Japan) Ena Shibahara; 5–7, 7–6^{(7–1)}, [10–5]	(Thailand) Mananchaya Sawangkaew (Thailand) Lanlana Tararudee	(Japan) Aoi Ito (Australia) Talia Gibson	(United Kingdom) Heather Watson (Australia) Maddison Inglis (Netherlands) Arianne Hartono (Canada) Rebecca Marino
April 21	Oeiras CETO Open; Oeiras, Portugal; Clay; W100; Singles and doubles draws	(China) Yuan Yue; 4–6, 6–4, 6–2	(Belgium) Greet Minnen	(Portugal) Francisca Jorge (Latvia) Darja Semeņistaja	(Germany) Mona Barthel; Elena Pridankina (United States) Louisa Chirico (Austria) Sinja Kraus
April 21	Oeiras CETO Open; Oeiras, Portugal; Clay; W100; Singles and doubles draws	(Portugal) Francisca Jorge (Portugal) Matilde Jorge; 6–7^{(7–9)}, 6–1, [1–0] ret.	(Serbia) Aleksandra Krunić (United States) Sabrina Santamaria	(Portugal) Francisca Jorge (Latvia) Darja Semeņistaja	(Germany) Mona Barthel; Elena Pridankina (United States) Louisa Chirico (Austria) Sinja Kraus
April 21	Boar's Head Resort Women's Open; Charlottesville, United States; Clay; W100; Singles and doubles draws	(United States) Iva Jovic; 6–0, 6–1	(Romania) Irina Bara	(Brazil) Laura Pigossi (Australia) Astra Sharma	(United States) Whitney Osuigwe; Iryna Shymanovich (United States) Hanna Chang (United States) Lauren Davis
April 21	Boar's Head Resort Women's Open; Charlottesville, United States; Clay; W100; Singles and doubles draws	Maria Kozyreva; Irina Shymanovich; 7–5, 7–5	(Canada) Kayla Cross (Australia) Petra Hule	(Brazil) Laura Pigossi (Australia) Astra Sharma	(United States) Whitney Osuigwe; Iryna Shymanovich (United States) Hanna Chang (United States) Lauren Davis
April 21	Chiasso Open; Chiasso, Switzerland; Clay; W75; Singles and doubles draws	(Austria) Julia Grabher; 6–1, 6–2	(Ukraine) Katarina Zavatska	(Liechtenstein) Kathinka von Deichmann (Belgium) Hanne Vandewinkel	(Czech Republic) Barbora Palicová (France) Alice Ramé (Poland) Katarzyna Kawa (Greece) Sapfo Sakellaridi
April 21	Chiasso Open; Chiasso, Switzerland; Clay; W75; Singles and doubles draws	(United Kingdom) Alicia Barnett (France) Elixane Lechemia; 6–2, 6–3	(Algeria) Inès Ibbou (Netherlands) Bibiane Schoofs	(Liechtenstein) Kathinka von Deichmann (Belgium) Hanne Vandewinkel	(Czech Republic) Barbora Palicová (France) Alice Ramé (Poland) Katarzyna Kawa (Greece) Sapfo Sakellaridi
April 21	Santa Margherita di Pula, Italy; Clay; W35; Singles and doubles draws	(Italy) Nuria Brancaccio; 6–7^{(2–7)}, 6–4, 6–1	(Germany) Nastasja Schunk	(Bulgaria) Denislava Glushkova (Germany) Katharina Hobgarski	(France) Lucie Pawlak (France) Julie Belgraver (Italy) Jennifer Ruggeri (Italy) Giorgia Pedone
April 21	Santa Margherita di Pula, Italy; Clay; W35; Singles and doubles draws	(Netherlands) Jasmijn Gimbrère (Netherlands) Stéphanie Visscher; 6–4, 6–2	(Norway) Astrid Brune Olsen (Japan) Hikaru Sato	(Bulgaria) Denislava Glushkova (Germany) Katharina Hobgarski	(France) Lucie Pawlak (France) Julie Belgraver (Italy) Jennifer Ruggeri (Italy) Giorgia Pedone
April 21	Sharm El Sheikh, Egypt; Hard; W35; Singles and doubles draws	Anastasia Gasanova; 6–3, 6–4	(Spain) Eva Guerrero Álvarez	(Egypt) Sandra Samir; Mariia Tkacheva	(Kosovo) Arlinda Rushiti (Poland) Martyna Kubka (United Kingdom) Katie Swan (Czech Republic) Tereza Krejčová
April 21	Sharm El Sheikh, Egypt; Hard; W35; Singles and doubles draws	Maria Golovina; Daria Shadchneva; Walkover	Varvara Panshina; Daria Zelinskaya	(Egypt) Sandra Samir; Mariia Tkacheva	(Kosovo) Arlinda Rushiti (Poland) Martyna Kubka (United Kingdom) Katie Swan (Czech Republic) Tereza Krejčová
April 21	Charlotte, United States; Clay; W35; Singles and doubles draws	(Spain) Alicia Herrero Liñana; 6–1, 7–6^{(7–1)}	(United States) Ayana Akli	(United States) Jada Robinson (Serbia) Katarina Jokić	(United States) Alexis Nguyen (United States) Jaeda Daniel (United States) Julia Adams (Japan) Mayu Crossley
April 21	Charlotte, United States; Clay; W35; Singles and doubles draws	(Japan) Haruna Arakawa (Bosnia and Herzegovina) Ema Burgić; 6–2, 7–5	(Mexico) María Portillo Ramírez (Mexico) Victoria Rodríguez	(United States) Jada Robinson (Serbia) Katarina Jokić	(United States) Alexis Nguyen (United States) Jaeda Daniel (United States) Julia Adams (Japan) Mayu Crossley
April 21	Wuning, China; Hard; W15; Singles and doubles draws	(China) Yang Yidi; 6–3, 6–3	(South Korea) Jeong Bo-young	(China) Zhu Chenting (China) Guo Meiqi	Sofya Lansere (Japan) Mayuka Aikawa (Hong Kong) Wu Ho-ching (China) Liu Zhirui
April 21	Wuning, China; Hard; W15; Singles and doubles draws	(China) Hou Yanan (China) Wang Jiayi; 2–6, 7–6^{(7–5)}, [10–6]	(Japan) Mayuka Aikawa (Japan) Miyu Nakashima	(China) Zhu Chenting (China) Guo Meiqi	Sofya Lansere (Japan) Mayuka Aikawa (Hong Kong) Wu Ho-ching (China) Liu Zhirui
April 21	Shymkent, Kazakhstan; Clay; W15; Singles and doubles draws	Ekaterina Maklakova; 6–4, 6–3	(Austria) Ekaterina Perelygina	Anna Snigireva; Elina Nepliy	(Belgium) Vicky Van de Peer (Germany) Valentina Steiner (Austria) Claudia Gasparovic; Valeriya Yushchenko
April 21	Shymkent, Kazakhstan; Clay; W15; Singles and doubles draws	(Uzbekistan) Daria Shubina; Valeriya Yushchenko; 6–1, 6–2	(Kazakhstan) Ingkar Dyussebay (Kazakhstan) Satima Toregen	Anna Snigireva; Elina Nepliy	(Belgium) Vicky Van de Peer (Germany) Valentina Steiner (Austria) Claudia Gasparovic; Valeriya Yushchenko
April 21	Kuršumlijska Banja, Serbia; Clay; W15; Singles and doubles draws	(Romania) Lavinia Tănăsie; 6–1, 6–3	(France) Amandine Monnot	(China) Xu Shilin (Serbia) Anastasija Cvetković	(Serbia) Andjela Lazarević (Serbia) Nikol Paleček (Greece) Dimitra Pavlou; Karine Sarkisova
April 21	Kuršumlijska Banja, Serbia; Clay; W15; Singles and doubles draws	(Netherlands) Joy de Zeeuw (Netherlands) Britt du Pree; 6–3, 6–3	(Ukraine) Anastasiia Firman (Montenegro) Tea Nikčević	(China) Xu Shilin (Serbia) Anastasija Cvetković	(Serbia) Andjela Lazarević (Serbia) Nikol Paleček (Greece) Dimitra Pavlou; Karine Sarkisova
April 21	Antalya, Turkiye; Clay; W15; Singles and doubles draws	(Czech Republic) Sarah Melany Fajmonová; 7–5, 6–1	(Japan) Yuki Naito	(India) Vaishnavi Adkar; Kristina Kroitor	(Italy) Isabella Maria Șerban (Belgium) Amélie Van Impe (Germany) Marie Vogt (Slovakia) Karolína Mráziková
April 21	Antalya, Turkiye; Clay; W15; Singles and doubles draws	(Spain) Sara Dols (Japan) Yuki Naito; Walkover	(Belgium) Kaat Coppez (Belgium) Amélie Van Impe	(India) Vaishnavi Adkar; Kristina Kroitor	(Italy) Isabella Maria Șerban (Belgium) Amélie Van Impe (Germany) Marie Vogt (Slovakia) Karolína Mráziková
April 21	Monastir, Tunisia; Hard; W15; Singles and doubles draws	Anastasiia Gureva; 6–0, 2–0 ret.	(India) Zeel Desai	Milana Zhabrailova (Austria) Arabella Koller	(France) Alyssa Réguer (Italy) Valentina Losciale (Bulgaria) Lidia Encheva (Germany) Anja Wildgruber
April 21	Monastir, Tunisia; Hard; W15; Singles and doubles draws	(United States) Abigail Rencheli (United States) Hibah Shaikh; 6–4, 6–2	(India) Zeel Desai; Anastasiia Gureva	Milana Zhabrailova (Austria) Arabella Koller	(France) Alyssa Réguer (Italy) Valentina Losciale (Bulgaria) Lidia Encheva (Germany) Anja Wildgruber
April 28	Kangaroo Cup; Gifu, Japan; Hard; W100; Singles and doubles draws	(China) Zhang Shuai; 6–3, 6–4	(Thailand) Mananchaya Sawangkaew	(Australia) Emerson Jones (United Kingdom) Heather Watson	(Chinese Taipei) Liang En-shuo (Japan) Wakana Sonobe (Japan) Ena Koike (China) Zheng Wushuang
April 28	Kangaroo Cup; Gifu, Japan; Hard; W100; Singles and doubles draws	(Japan) Momoko Kobori (Japan) Ayano Shimizu; 6–1, 6–2	(United States) Emina Bektas (United Kingdom) Lily Miyazaki	(Australia) Emerson Jones (United Kingdom) Heather Watson	(Chinese Taipei) Liang En-shuo (Japan) Wakana Sonobe (Japan) Ena Koike (China) Zheng Wushuang
April 28	Wiesbaden Tennis Open; Wiesbaden, Germany; Clay; W100; Singles and doubles draws	(Hungary) Anna Bondár; 6–2, 6–4	(Austria) Julia Grabher	(Latvia) Darja Semeņistaja (Switzerland) Susan Bandecchi	(Switzerland) Simona Waltert (Czech Republic) Tereza Valentová (Germany) Mona Barthel (Argentina) Solana Sierra
April 28	Wiesbaden Tennis Open; Wiesbaden, Germany; Clay; W100; Singles and doubles draws	(Kazakhstan) Zhibek Kulambayeva (Latvia) Darja Semeņistaja; 4–6, 6–3, [11–9]	(Czech Republic) Jesika Malečková (Czech Republic) Miriam Škoch	(Latvia) Darja Semeņistaja (Switzerland) Susan Bandecchi	(Switzerland) Simona Waltert (Czech Republic) Tereza Valentová (Germany) Mona Barthel (Argentina) Solana Sierra
April 28	FineMark Women's Pro Tennis Championship; Bonita Springs, United States; Clay; W100; Singles and doubles draws	(Australia) Astra Sharma; 6–2, 6–2	(United States) Whitney Osuigwe	(Serbia) Katarina Jokić (United States) Elvina Kalieva	(Brazil) Laura Pigossi; Iryna Shymanovich (United States) Anna Rogers (Slovakia) Martina Okáľová
April 28	FineMark Women's Pro Tennis Championship; Bonita Springs, United States; Clay; W100; Singles and doubles draws	Maria Kozyreva; Iryna Shymanovich; 6–2, 6–2	(United States) Makenna Jones (United States) Angela Kulikov	(Serbia) Katarina Jokić (United States) Elvina Kalieva	(Brazil) Laura Pigossi; Iryna Shymanovich (United States) Anna Rogers (Slovakia) Martina Okáľová
April 28	Lopota, Georgia; Hard; W50; Singles and doubles draws	(Georgia (country)) Ekaterine Gorgodze; 6–4, 7–5	(Poland) Linda Klimovičová	(Chinese Taipei) Joanna Garland (United States) Carol Young Suh Lee	Evialina Laskevich; Anastasia Tikhonova; Alexandra Shubladze; Aliona Falei
April 28	Lopota, Georgia; Hard; W50; Singles and doubles draws	(India) Rutuja Bhosale (New Zealand) Paige Hourigan; 6–3, 6–2	(India) Shrivalli Bhamidipaty; Alexandra Shubladze	(Chinese Taipei) Joanna Garland (United States) Carol Young Suh Lee	Evialina Laskevich; Anastasia Tikhonova; Alexandra Shubladze; Aliona Falei
April 28	Yecla, Spain; Hard; W50; Singles and doubles draws	(France) Harmony Tan; 3–6, 6–3, 6–1	(Ukraine) Daria Snigur	(France) Amandine Hesse (Slovakia) Viktória Hrunčáková	(Latvia) Kamilla Bartone (Malta) Francesca Curmi (Serbia) Elena Milovanović (Netherlands) Eva Vedder
April 28	Yecla, Spain; Hard; W50; Singles and doubles draws	(Germany) Gina Marie Dittmann (Belgium) Jana Otzipka; 6–4, 1–6, [10–5]	(United States) Mia Horvit (Japan) Michika Ozeki	(France) Amandine Hesse (Slovakia) Viktória Hrunčáková	(Latvia) Kamilla Bartone (Malta) Francesca Curmi (Serbia) Elena Milovanović (Netherlands) Eva Vedder
April 28	Goyang, South Korea; Hard; W35; Singles and doubles draws	(Japan) Rina Saigo; 2–6, 6–4, 6–1	(Indonesia) Janice Tjen	(China) You Xiaodi (South Korea) Ahn Yu–jin	(Japan) Saki Imamura (Japan) Ikumi Yamazaki (Japan) Chihiro Muramatsu (Japan) Ayumi Koshiishi
April 28	Goyang, South Korea; Hard; W35; Singles and doubles draws	(Japan) Saki Imamura (Indonesia) Janice Tjen; 4–6, 6–0, [10–5]	(South Korea) Kim Na-ri (Thailand) Punnin Kovapitukted	(China) You Xiaodi (South Korea) Ahn Yu–jin	(Japan) Saki Imamura (Japan) Ikumi Yamazaki (Japan) Chihiro Muramatsu (Japan) Ayumi Koshiishi
April 28	Santa Margherita di Pula, Italy; Clay; W35; Singles and doubles draws	(Ukraine) Oleksandra Oliynykova; 5–7, 6–2, 6–2	(Italy) Dalila Spiteri	(Spain) Ariana Geerlings (Austria) Lilli Tagger	(Czech Republic) Gabriela Knutson (United States) Ashley Lahey (Romania) Arina Vasilescu (Norway) Astrid Brune Olsen
April 28	Santa Margherita di Pula, Italy; Clay; W35; Singles and doubles draws	(Norway) Astrid Brune Olsen (United States) Ashley Lahey; 3–6, 6–4, [10–5]	(Netherlands) Jasmijn Gimbrère (Netherlands) Stéphanie Visscher	(Spain) Ariana Geerlings (Austria) Lilli Tagger	(Czech Republic) Gabriela Knutson (United States) Ashley Lahey (Romania) Arina Vasilescu (Norway) Astrid Brune Olsen
April 28	Nottingham, United Kingdom; Hard; W35; Singles and doubles draws	(United Kingdom) Amarni Banks; 7–5, 1–6, 6–2	(United Kingdom) Alice Gillan	(United Kingdom) Amelia Rajecki (United Kingdom) Angelica Blake	(United Kingdom) Daniela Piani (United Kingdom) Mingge Xu (United States) Jordyn McBride (United Kingdom) Lauryn John-Baptiste
April 28	Nottingham, United Kingdom; Hard; W35; Singles and doubles draws	(United Kingdom) Naiktha Bains (United Kingdom) Holly Hutchinson; 6–3, 6–3	(United Kingdom) Brooke Black (United Kingdom) Daniela Piani	(United Kingdom) Amelia Rajecki (United Kingdom) Angelica Blake	(United Kingdom) Daniela Piani (United Kingdom) Mingge Xu (United States) Jordyn McBride (United Kingdom) Lauryn John-Baptiste
April 28	Boca Raton, United States; Clay; W35; Singles and doubles draws	(Argentina) Luisina Giovannini; 6–1, 6–1	(Greece) Despina Papamichail	(Bulgaria) Gergana Topalova (United States) Ayana Akli	(Japan) Nagi Hanatani (Mexico) María Portillo Ramírez (United States) Fiona Crawley (Peru) Dana Guzmán
April 28	Boca Raton, United States; Clay; W35; Singles and doubles draws	(United States) Ayana Akli (Morocco) Diae El Jardi; 7–6^{(7–1)}, 7–5	(Greece) Despina Papamichail (Bulgaria) Gergana Topalova	(Bulgaria) Gergana Topalova (United States) Ayana Akli	(Japan) Nagi Hanatani (Mexico) María Portillo Ramírez (United States) Fiona Crawley (Peru) Dana Guzmán
April 28	Shymkent, Kazakhstan; Clay; W15; Singles and doubles draws	Valeriya Yushchenko; 2–6, 6–0, 6–4	(Germany) Valentina Steiner	Elina Nepliy (Belgium) Vicky Van de Peer	(Austria) Ekaterina Perelygina (Germany) Lorena Schaedel; Ekaterina Maklakova; Anna Ureke
April 28	Shymkent, Kazakhstan; Clay; W15; Singles and doubles draws	Elina Nepliy (Kazakhstan) Aruzhan Sagandykova; 6–7^{(4–7)}, 6–2, [10–8]	Ekaterina Maklakova; Anna Ureke	Elina Nepliy (Belgium) Vicky Van de Peer	(Austria) Ekaterina Perelygina (Germany) Lorena Schaedel; Ekaterina Maklakova; Anna Ureke
April 28	Oegstgeest, Netherlands; Clay; W15; Singles and doubles draws	(Spain) Cristina Diaz Adrover; 6–4, 4–6, 6–1	(Switzerland) Alina Granwehr	(Germany) Marie Vogt (Netherlands) Merel Hoedt	(Czech Republic) Nikola Břečková (Netherlands) Isis Louise van den Broek (Netherlands) Sarah van Emst; Polina Bakhmutkina
April 28	Oegstgeest, Netherlands; Clay; W15; Singles and doubles draws	(Netherlands) Joy de Zeeuw (Netherlands) Britt du Pree; 4–6, 6–3, [10–3]	(Netherlands) Demi Tran (Germany) Marie Vogt	(Germany) Marie Vogt (Netherlands) Merel Hoedt	(Czech Republic) Nikola Břečková (Netherlands) Isis Louise van den Broek (Netherlands) Sarah van Emst; Polina Bakhmutkina
April 28	Kuršumlijska Banja, Serbia; Clay; W15; Singles and doubles draws	(Serbia) Natalija Senić; 6–1, 6–1	(Serbia) Anja Stanković	(France) Amandine Monnot (Serbia) Luna Vujović	(Liechtenstein) Sylvie Zünd (Serbia) Draginja Vuković (Romania) Maria Sara Popa (Czech Republic) Michaela Bayerlová
April 28	Kuršumlijska Banja, Serbia; Clay; W15; Singles and doubles draws	(Czech Republic) Michaela Bayerlová (Romania) Ștefania Bojică; 6–2, 6–3	(Germany) Chantal Sauvant (Serbia) Anja Stanković	(France) Amandine Monnot (Serbia) Luna Vujović	(Liechtenstein) Sylvie Zünd (Serbia) Draginja Vuković (Romania) Maria Sara Popa (Czech Republic) Michaela Bayerlová
April 28	Monastir, Tunisia; Hard; W15; Singles and doubles draws	(China) Han Jiangxue; 6–4, 6–2	(Spain) María Aran Teixidó García	(Austria) Arabella Koller (Portugal) Inês Murta	Anastasiia Gureva; Milana Zhabrailova (Italy) Benedetta Ortenzi (United States) Hibah Shaikh
April 28	Monastir, Tunisia; Hard; W15; Singles and doubles draws	(Denmark) Rebecca Munk Mortensen (Portugal) Inês Murta; 6–3, 6–1	(Poland) Daria Gorska; Milana Zhabrailova	(Austria) Arabella Koller (Portugal) Inês Murta	Anastasiia Gureva; Milana Zhabrailova (Italy) Benedetta Ortenzi (United States) Hibah Shaikh

=== May ===
Week of	Tournament	Winner	Runners-up	Semifinalists	Quarterfinalists
May 5	Advantage Cars Prague Open; Prague, Czechia; Clay; W75; Singles and doubles draws	(United Kingdom) Francesca Jones; 6–3, 6–4	(Japan) Ena Shibahara	(Australia) Priscilla Hon (Belgium) Hanne Vandewinkel	(Serbia) Mia Ristić (Poland) Katarzyna Kawa (Canada) Carson Branstine (Turkey) Ayla Aksu
May 5	Advantage Cars Prague Open; Prague, Czechia; Clay; W75; Singles and doubles draws	(Netherlands) Jasmijn Gimbrère (Czech Republic) Denisa Hindová; 7–6^{(7–5)}, 7–5	(Czech Republic) Aneta Kučmová (Greece) Sapfo Sakellaridi	(Australia) Priscilla Hon (Belgium) Hanne Vandewinkel	(Serbia) Mia Ristić (Poland) Katarzyna Kawa (Canada) Carson Branstine (Turkey) Ayla Aksu
May 5	Open Saint-Gaudens Occitanie; Saint-Gaudens, France; Clay; W75; Singles and doubles draws	(France) Loïs Boisson; 7–6^{(7–4)}, 6–0	Tatiana Prozorova	(France) Carole Monnet (France) Jessika Ponchet	(Italy) Jessica Bertoldo (Italy) Camilla Rosatello (France) Julie Belgraver; Alina Charaeva
May 5	Open Saint-Gaudens Occitanie; Saint-Gaudens, France; Clay; W75; Singles and doubles draws	(Czech Republic) Gabriela Knutson (Czech Republic) Anna Sisková; 6–2, 6–2	(France) Émeline Dartron (France) Tiantsoa Sarah Rakotomanga Rajaonah	(France) Carole Monnet (France) Jessika Ponchet	(Italy) Jessica Bertoldo (Italy) Camilla Rosatello (France) Julie Belgraver; Alina Charaeva
May 5	Lopota, Georgia; Hard; W50; Singles and doubles draws	(United States) Carol Young Suh Lee; 6–7^{(7–9)}, 7–6^{(7–3)}, 6–4	(Georgia (country)) Ekaterine Gorgodze	(Chinese Taipei) Joanna Garland (Georgia (country)) Sofia Shapatava	(France) Tiphanie Lemaître; Aliona Falei; Rada Zolotareva (India) Shrivalli Bhamidipaty
May 5	Lopota, Georgia; Hard; W50; Singles and doubles draws	Kira Pavlova; Ksenia Zaytseva; 6–4, 4–6, [10–7]	Varvara Panshina; Daria Zelinskaya	(Chinese Taipei) Joanna Garland (Georgia (country)) Sofia Shapatava	(France) Tiphanie Lemaître; Aliona Falei; Rada Zolotareva (India) Shrivalli Bhamidipaty
May 5	Indian Harbour Beach, United States; Clay; W50; Singles and doubles draws	(Bulgaria) Lia Karatancheva; 6–2, 6–7^{(6–8)}, 6–3	(Australia) Arina Rodionova	Kristina Liutova (India) Riya Bhatia	(Slovakia) Martina Okáľová (Mexico) Ana Sofía Sánchez (Spain) Alicia Herrero Liñana (United States) Hanna Chang
May 5	Indian Harbour Beach, United States; Clay; W50; Singles and doubles draws	(United States) Haley Giavara (Australia) Alexandra Osborne; 6–3, 3–6, [10–7]	(United Kingdom) Tara Moore (United States) Abigail Rencheli	Kristina Liutova (India) Riya Bhatia	(Slovakia) Martina Okáľová (Mexico) Ana Sofía Sánchez (Spain) Alicia Herrero Liñana (United States) Hanna Chang
May 5	Fukuoka International Women's Cup; Fukuoka, Japan; Carpet; W35; Singles and doubles draws	(Australia) Emerson Jones; 7–6^{(7–4)}, 6–4	(Japan) Himeno Sakatsume	(Kazakhstan) Zarina Diyas (Japan) Shiho Akita	(Australia) Lizette Cabrera (Japan) Eri Shimizu (Japan) Miho Kuramochi (China) Ma Yexin
May 5	Fukuoka International Women's Cup; Fukuoka, Japan; Carpet; W35; Singles and doubles draws	(Japan) Momoko Kobori (Japan) Ayano Shimizu; 4–6, 6–2, [10–8]	(Japan) Miho Kuramochi (Japan) Akiko Omae	(Kazakhstan) Zarina Diyas (Japan) Shiho Akita	(Australia) Lizette Cabrera (Japan) Eri Shimizu (Japan) Miho Kuramochi (China) Ma Yexin
May 5	Goyang, South Korea; Hard; W35; Singles and doubles draws	(Indonesia) Janice Tjen; 6–4, 6–1	(China) Zhu Lin	(China) Guo Hanyu (South Korea) Lee Eun-hye	(Japan) Hiromi Abe (United States) Jenna DeFalco (South Korea) Back Da-yeon (China) Li Zongyu
May 5	Goyang, South Korea; Hard; W35; Singles and doubles draws	(China) Feng Shuo (China) Li Zongyu; 6–2, 7–5	(Japan) Hiromi Abe (Japan) Ikumi Yamazaki	(China) Guo Hanyu (South Korea) Lee Eun-hye	(Japan) Hiromi Abe (United States) Jenna DeFalco (South Korea) Back Da-yeon (China) Li Zongyu
May 5	Santa Margherita di Pula, Italy; Clay; W35; Singles and doubles draws	(Ukraine) Oleksandra Oliynykova; 6–4, 6–0	Ekaterina Makarova	(Italy) Dalila Spiteri (Italy) Tatiana Pieri	(Spain) Ariana Geerlings (Italy) Beatrice Ricci (Serbia) Teodora Kostović (Netherlands) Anouck Vrancken Peeters
May 5	Santa Margherita di Pula, Italy; Clay; W35; Singles and doubles draws	(Italy) Deborah Chiesa (Italy) Dalila Spiteri; Walkover	(Spain) Ariana Geerlings (Italy) Sofia Rocchetti	(Italy) Dalila Spiteri (Italy) Tatiana Pieri	(Spain) Ariana Geerlings (Italy) Beatrice Ricci (Serbia) Teodora Kostović (Netherlands) Anouck Vrancken Peeters
May 5	Platja d'Aro, Spain; Clay; W35; Singles and doubles draws	(Spain) Ane Mintegi del Olmo; 3–6, 6–1, 6–3	(Switzerland) Jenny Dürst	(Spain) Carlota Martínez Círez (Cyprus) Raluca Șerban	(Spain) Aliona Bolsova (Germany) Joëlle Steur (United States) Julieta Pareja (Spain) Irene Burillo Escorihuela
May 5	Platja d'Aro, Spain; Clay; W35; Singles and doubles draws	(Switzerland) Jenny Dürst (Switzerland) Valentina Ryser; 6–4, 7–5	(Spain) María Martínez Vaquero (Spain) Alba Rey García	(Spain) Carlota Martínez Círez (Cyprus) Raluca Șerban	(Spain) Aliona Bolsova (Germany) Joëlle Steur (United States) Julieta Pareja (Spain) Irene Burillo Escorihuela
May 5	Nottingham, United Kingdom; Hard; W35; Singles and doubles draws	(Spain) Eva Guerrero Álvarez; 6–2, 7–6^{(9–7)}	(United Kingdom) Naiktha Bains	(United Kingdom) Emily Appleton (United Kingdom) Amarni Banks	(United Kingdom) Mika Stojsavljevic (United Kingdom) Amelia Rajecki (United Kingdom) Brooke Black (United Kingdom) Hollie Smart
May 5	Nottingham, United Kingdom; Hard; W35; Singles and doubles draws	(France) Alice Robbe (Kosovo) Arlinda Rushiti; 3–6, 6–4, [10–5]	(United Kingdom) Naiktha Bains (United Kingdom) Holly Hutchinson	(United Kingdom) Emily Appleton (United Kingdom) Amarni Banks	(United Kingdom) Mika Stojsavljevic (United Kingdom) Amelia Rajecki (United Kingdom) Brooke Black (United Kingdom) Hollie Smart
May 5	Boca Raton, United States; Clay; W35; Singles and doubles draws	(United States) Monika Ekstrand; 6–2, 6–1	(United States) Ayana Akli	(United States) Jada Robinson (Bulgaria) Gergana Topalova	(United States) Allura Zamarripa (United States) Kayla Day (United States) Alana Smith (Argentina) Luisina Giovannini
May 5	Boca Raton, United States; Clay; W35; Singles and doubles draws	(United States) Fiona Crawley (United States) Alana Smith; 6–4, 6–2	(United States) Kayla Day (United States) Allura Zamarripa	(United States) Jada Robinson (Bulgaria) Gergana Topalova	(United States) Allura Zamarripa (United States) Kayla Day (United States) Alana Smith (Argentina) Luisina Giovannini
May 5	Kalmar, Sweden; Clay; W15; Singles and doubles draws	(Germany) Tessa Johanna Brockmann; 2–6, 7–6^{(10–8)}, 7–6^{(7–4)}	(Estonia) Elena Malõgina	(Belgium) Amelie Van Impe (Netherlands) Loes Ebeling Koning	(Finland) Clarissa Blomqvist (Netherlands) Annelin Bakker (Netherlands) Sarah van Emst (Ukraine) Daria Yesypchuk
May 5	Kalmar, Sweden; Clay; W15; Singles and doubles draws	(Netherlands) Annelin Bakker (Netherlands) Britt du Pree; 6–3, 6–3	(Netherlands) Loes Ebeling Koning (Netherlands) Sarah van Emst	(Belgium) Amelie Van Impe (Netherlands) Loes Ebeling Koning	(Finland) Clarissa Blomqvist (Netherlands) Annelin Bakker (Netherlands) Sarah van Emst (Ukraine) Daria Yesypchuk
May 5	Bucharest, Romania; Clay; W15; Singles and doubles draws	(Romania) Mara Gae; 6–4, 7–5	(Romania) Eva Maria Ionescu	(Romania) Elena Ruxandra Bertea (Italy) Gaia Squarcialupi	(Romania) Anamaria Federica Oana (Romania) Lavinia Tănăsie (Ukraine) Alisa Baranovska (Romania) Maria Sara Popa
May 5	Bucharest, Romania; Clay; W15; Singles and doubles draws	(Romania) Bianca Bărbulescu (Romania) Lavinia Tănăsie; 3–6, 6–4, [10–5]	(Bulgaria) Lidia Encheva (Romania) Diana-Ioana Simionescu	(Romania) Elena Ruxandra Bertea (Italy) Gaia Squarcialupi	(Romania) Anamaria Federica Oana (Romania) Lavinia Tănăsie (Ukraine) Alisa Baranovska (Romania) Maria Sara Popa
May 5	Kuršumlijska Banja, Serbia; Clay; W15; Singles and doubles draws	(Switzerland) Alina Granwehr; 6–4, 5–7, 6–2	Darya Astakhova	(Romania) Georgia Crăciun (Serbia) Anja Stanković	(China) Xu Shilin (Serbia) Andjela Lazarević (Serbia) Luna Vujović (Netherlands) Madelief Hageman
May 5	Kuršumlijska Banja, Serbia; Clay; W15; Singles and doubles draws	(Switzerland) Alina Granwehr (Netherlands) Madelief Hageman; 5–7, 6–3, [10–7]	(Brazil) Ana Candiotto (Argentina) Justina María González Daniele	(Romania) Georgia Crăciun (Serbia) Anja Stanković	(China) Xu Shilin (Serbia) Andjela Lazarević (Serbia) Luna Vujović (Netherlands) Madelief Hageman
May 5	Monastir, Tunisia; Hard; W15; Singles and doubles draws	(France) Laïa Petretic; 6–3, 5–7, 6–1	(United States) Kristina Penickova	Arina Arifullina; Victoria Milovanova	(Cyprus) Olga Danilova (Spain) Noelia Bouzó Zanotti (Portugal) Inês Murta; Ksenia Smirnova
May 5	Monastir, Tunisia; Hard; W15; Singles and doubles draws	(United States) Annika Penickova (United States) Kristina Penickova; 6–4, 6–4	Arina Arifullina (Portugal) Inês Murta	Arina Arifullina; Victoria Milovanova	(Cyprus) Olga Danilova (Spain) Noelia Bouzó Zanotti (Portugal) Inês Murta; Ksenia Smirnova
May 12	Zagreb Open; Zagreb, Croatia; Clay; W75; Singles and doubles draws	(Croatia) Tara Würth; 6–2, 4–6, 6–3	(Spain) Guiomar Maristany	(United States) Caty McNally (Thailand) Lanlana Tararudee	(Croatia) Petra Marčinko (Serbia) Lola Radivojević (Croatia) Iva Primorac (Spain) Andrea Lázaro García
May 12	Zagreb Open; Zagreb, Croatia; Clay; W75; Singles and doubles draws	(Portugal) Francisca Jorge (Portugal) Matilde Jorge; 6–2, 6–0	(Croatia) Lucija Ćirić Bagarić; Vitalia Diatchenko	(United States) Caty McNally (Thailand) Lanlana Tararudee	(Croatia) Petra Marčinko (Serbia) Lola Radivojević (Croatia) Iva Primorac (Spain) Andrea Lázaro García
May 12	Empire Slovak Open; Trnava, Slovakia; Clay; W75; Singles and doubles draws	(Germany) Tamara Korpatsch; 1–6, 6–4, 6–4	(Japan) Mai Hontama	(France) Carole Monnet (Slovakia) Renáta Jamrichová	(Ukraine) Anastasiia Sobolieva (Czech Republic) Aneta Kučmová (Australia) Astra Sharma (Germany) Nastasja Schunk
May 12	Empire Slovak Open; Trnava, Slovakia; Clay; W75; Singles and doubles draws	(France) Estelle Cascino (France) Carole Monnet; 6–2, 6–2	(Netherlands) Arianne Hartono (India) Prarthana Thombare	(France) Carole Monnet (Slovakia) Renáta Jamrichová	(Ukraine) Anastasiia Sobolieva (Czech Republic) Aneta Kučmová (Australia) Astra Sharma (Germany) Nastasja Schunk
May 12	Kurume Cup; Kurume, Japan; Carpet; W50+H; Singles and doubles draws	(Kazakhstan) Zarina Diyas; 6–4, 6–3	(Japan) Ayano Shimizu	(China) Wang Meiling (Japan) Miho Kuramochi	(Japan) Momoko Kobori (Japan) Saki Imamura (Japan) Aoi Ide (Australia) Gabriella Da Silva-Fick
May 12	Kurume Cup; Kurume, Japan; Carpet; W50+H; Singles and doubles draws	(Japan) Momoko Kobori (Japan) Ayano Shimizu; 6–1, 5–7, [10–5]	(China) Ma Yexin (China) Wang Meiling	(China) Wang Meiling (Japan) Miho Kuramochi	(Japan) Momoko Kobori (Japan) Saki Imamura (Japan) Aoi Ide (Australia) Gabriella Da Silva-Fick
May 12	Changwon, South Korea; Hard; W35; Singles and doubles draws	Ekaterina Reyngold; 4–6, 7–5, 7–6^{(7–2)}	(China) Zheng Wushuang	(Indonesia) Janice Tjen (Hong Kong) Cody Wong	(Japan) Ayumi Koshiishi (South Korea) Back Da-yeon (Japan) Hiromi Abe (South Korea) Ku Yeon-woo
May 12	Changwon, South Korea; Hard; W35; Singles and doubles draws	(Japan) Hiromi Abe (Japan) Ikumi Yamazaki; 6–4, 6–2	(Chinese Taipei) Lee Ya-hsin (Hong Kong) Cody Wong	(Indonesia) Janice Tjen (Hong Kong) Cody Wong	(Japan) Ayumi Koshiishi (South Korea) Back Da-yeon (Japan) Hiromi Abe (South Korea) Ku Yeon-woo
May 12	Båstad, Sweden; Clay; W35; Singles and doubles draws	(Argentina) Jazmín Ortenzi; 6–4, 6–2	(Spain) Irene Burillo Escorihuela	(Australia) Jaimee Fourlis (Morocco) Yasmine Kabbaj	(Switzerland) Leonie Küng (United States) Alexis Blokhina (Turkey) İpek Öz; Anastasia Tikhonova
May 12	Båstad, Sweden; Clay; W35; Singles and doubles draws	(Colombia) Yuliana Lizarazo (Colombia) María Paulina Pérez; 6–3, 6–2	Anastasia Tikhonova (Sweden) Lisa Zaar	(Australia) Jaimee Fourlis (Morocco) Yasmine Kabbaj	(Switzerland) Leonie Küng (United States) Alexis Blokhina (Turkey) İpek Öz; Anastasia Tikhonova
May 12	Bethany Beach, United States; Clay; W35; Singles and doubles draws	(United States) Ayana Akli; 6–2, 7–5	(Mexico) Ana Sofía Sánchez	(United States) Fiona Crawley (United States) Jada Robinson	(Greece) Despina Papamichail (United States) Alexis Nguyen (United States) Alana Smith (United States) Anna Rogers
May 12	Bethany Beach, United States; Clay; W35; Singles and doubles draws	(United States) Ivana Corley (United States) Jaeda Daniel; 6–4, 7–5	(Japan) Haruna Arakawa (United States) Haley Giavara	(United States) Fiona Crawley (United States) Jada Robinson	(Greece) Despina Papamichail (United States) Alexis Nguyen (United States) Alana Smith (United States) Anna Rogers
May 12	Maanshan, China; Hard (i); W15; Singles and doubles draws	(Indonesia) Priska Nugroho; 6–2, 6–4	(China) Zhu Chenting	(China) Wang Jiaqi (China) Lu Jingjing	(China) Han Jiangxue (United States) Amy Zhu (China) Guo Meiqi (China) Yang Yidi
May 12	Maanshan, China; Hard (i); W15; Singles and doubles draws	(Hong Kong) Wu Ho-ching (China) Yang Yidi; 5–7, 6–4, [10–7]	(China) Aitiyaguli Aixirefu (China) Zhu Chenting	(China) Wang Jiaqi (China) Lu Jingjing	(China) Han Jiangxue (United States) Amy Zhu (China) Guo Meiqi (China) Yang Yidi
May 12	Toyama, Japan; Hard; W15; Singles and doubles draws	(United States) Carol Young Suh Lee; 3–6, 6–1, 6–3	(Japan) Hayu Kinoshita	(United States) Jenna DeFalco (Japan) Sae Noguchi	(Japan) Mio Mushika (Japan) Moeka Miyata (Chinese Taipei) Lin Fang-an (South Korea) Kim Yu-jin
May 12	Toyama, Japan; Hard; W15; Singles and doubles draws	(United States) Carol Young Suh Lee (South Korea) Wi Hwi-won; 7–6^{(7–5)}, 6–2	(Japan) Hayu Kinoshita (Japan) Honoka Kobayashi	(United States) Jenna DeFalco (Japan) Sae Noguchi	(Japan) Mio Mushika (Japan) Moeka Miyata (Chinese Taipei) Lin Fang-an (South Korea) Kim Yu-jin
May 12	Monzón, Spain; Clay; W15; Singles and doubles draws	(United Kingdom) Alice Gillan; 3–6, 6–2, 6–3	(Spain) Alba Rey García	(United Kingdom) Ranah Stoiber (Italy) Valentina Losciale	(Spain) Claudia Ferrer Pérez (Uzbekistan) Vlada Ekshibarova (South Africa) Wozuko Mdlulwa (Italy) Carlotta Moccia
May 12	Monzón, Spain; Clay; W15; Singles and doubles draws	(Spain) María Martínez Vaquero (Spain) Alba Rey García; 6–4, 6–2	(Netherlands) Joy de Zeeuw (United Kingdom) Ranah Stoiber	(United Kingdom) Ranah Stoiber (Italy) Valentina Losciale	(Spain) Claudia Ferrer Pérez (Uzbekistan) Vlada Ekshibarova (South Africa) Wozuko Mdlulwa (Italy) Carlotta Moccia
May 12	Kotka, Finland; Clay; W15; Singles and doubles draws	(Poland) Anna Hertel; 6–2, 6–3	(Poland) Nadia Kulbiej	(Netherlands) Madelief Hageman; Victoria Kan	(Poland) Zuzanna Pawlikowska (Norway) Astrid Brune Olsen (Switzerland) Marie Mettraux (United Kingdom) Danielle Daley
May 12	Kotka, Finland; Clay; W15; Singles and doubles draws	(Netherlands) Madelief Hageman (Ukraine) Daria Yesypchuk; 6–4, 6–2	Polina Bakhmutkina (Norway) Astrid Brune Olsen	(Netherlands) Madelief Hageman; Victoria Kan	(Poland) Zuzanna Pawlikowska (Norway) Astrid Brune Olsen (Switzerland) Marie Mettraux (United Kingdom) Danielle Daley
May 12	Tsaghkadzor, Armenia; Clay; W15; Singles and doubles draws	Rada Zolotareva; 6–0, 7–5	(Armenia) Ani Amiraghyan	(United States) Mia Horvit; Kristina Kroitor	(Georgia (country)) Sofia Shapatava; Elina Nepliy; Valeriya Yushchenko; Ksenia Laskutova
May 12	Tsaghkadzor, Armenia; Clay; W15; Singles and doubles draws	Alina Yuneva; Valeriya Yushchenko; 6–4, 4–6, [10–6]	(Armenia) Ani Amiraghyan; Elina Nepliy	(United States) Mia Horvit; Kristina Kroitor	(Georgia (country)) Sofia Shapatava; Elina Nepliy; Valeriya Yushchenko; Ksenia Laskutova
May 12	Bucharest, Romania; Clay; W15; Singles and doubles draws	(Romania) Elena Ruxandra Bertea; 6–2, 6–2	(Romania) Lavinia Tănăsie	(Romania) Maia Ilinca Burcescu (Romania) Alexia Iulia Mărginean	(Germany) Mara Guth (Switzerland) Fiona Ganz (Germany) Tea Lukic (Czech Republic) Linda Ševčíková
May 12	Bucharest, Romania; Clay; W15; Singles and doubles draws	(Romania) Maia Ilinca Burcescu (Poland) Monika Stankiewicz; Walkover	(Romania) Karola Bejenaru (Slovakia) Laura Svatíková	(Romania) Maia Ilinca Burcescu (Romania) Alexia Iulia Mărginean	(Germany) Mara Guth (Switzerland) Fiona Ganz (Germany) Tea Lukic (Czech Republic) Linda Ševčíková
May 12	Kuršumlijska Banja, Serbia; Clay; W15; Singles and doubles draws	(Finland) Laura Hietaranta; 6–4, 6–1	Diana Demidova	(Switzerland) Alina Granwehr; Yuliya Hatouka	(Romania) Ștefania Bojică (China) Sun Xinran (Brazil) Ana Candiotto; Darya Astakhova
May 12	Kuršumlijska Banja, Serbia; Clay; W15; Singles and doubles draws	(Argentina) Justina María González Daniele (Greece) Elena Korokozidi; 6–2, 6–4	(Romania) Ștefania Bojică (Ukraine) Anastasiia Firman	(Switzerland) Alina Granwehr; Yuliya Hatouka	(Romania) Ștefania Bojică (China) Sun Xinran (Brazil) Ana Candiotto; Darya Astakhova
May 12	Monastir, Tunisia; Hard; W15; Singles and doubles draws	(United Kingdom) Ella McDonald; 6–3, 6–2	(Ukraine) Kateryna Lazarenko	(Zimbabwe) Valeria Bhunu (Lithuania) Patricija Paukštytė	Ekaterina Khayrutdinova (France) Laïa Petretic; Victoria Milovanova (Portugal) Inês Murta
May 12	Monastir, Tunisia; Hard; W15; Singles and doubles draws	(United States) Annika Penickova (United States) Kristina Penickova; 7–5, 6–2	(Egypt) Lamis Alhussein Abdel Aziz (Ukraine) Kateryna Lazarenko	(Zimbabwe) Valeria Bhunu (Lithuania) Patricija Paukštytė	Ekaterina Khayrutdinova (France) Laïa Petretic; Victoria Milovanova (Portugal) Inês Murta
May 12	Trelew, Argentina; Hard (i); W15; Singles and doubles draws	(Argentina) Martina Capurro Taborda; 3–6, 6–2, 6–1	(Argentina) Victoria Bosio	(Chile) Fernanda Labraña (Ecuador) Camila Romero	(Mexico) Marian Gómez Pezuela Cano (United States) Christasha McNeil (Peru) Romina Ccuno (Argentina) Luciana Moyano
May 12	Trelew, Argentina; Hard (i); W15; Singles and doubles draws	(Argentina) Martina Capurro Taborda (Mexico) Marian Gómez Pezuela Cano; 6–0, 7–6^{(9–7)}	(Argentina) Luciana Moyano (Ecuador) Camila Romero	(Chile) Fernanda Labraña (Ecuador) Camila Romero	(Mexico) Marian Gómez Pezuela Cano (United States) Christasha McNeil (Peru) Romina Ccuno (Argentina) Luciana Moyano
May 12	Orlando, United States; Clay; W15; Singles and doubles draws	(Japan) Mayu Crossley; 6–1, 2–6, 6–4	(Italy) Francesca Pace	(United States) Lani Chang (United States) Monika Ekstrand	(Romania) Elena-Teodora Cadar (Poland) Olivia Bergler (United States) Caroline Shao (Brazil) Carolina Bohrer Martins
May 12	Orlando, United States; Clay; W15; Singles and doubles draws	(United States) Samantha Alicea (United States) Jamilah Snells; 6–3, 7–5	(United States) Capucine Jauffret (United States) Ava Rodriguez	(United States) Lani Chang (United States) Monika Ekstrand	(Romania) Elena-Teodora Cadar (Poland) Olivia Bergler (United States) Caroline Shao (Brazil) Carolina Bohrer Martins
May 19	Kuršumlijska Banja, Serbia; Clay; W75; Singles and doubles draws	Alina Charaeva; 6–4, 7–6^{(7–5)}	(Serbia) Teodora Kostović	(Kazakhstan) Zhibek Kulambayeva (United States) Caty McNally	(Malta) Francesca Curmi (Bulgaria) Lia Karatancheva (Czech Republic) Anna Sisková (Romania) Irina Bara
May 19	Kuršumlijska Banja, Serbia; Clay; W75; Singles and doubles draws	(Turkey) Ayla Aksu (Czech Republic) Anna Sisková; 6–4, 6–2	(United Kingdom) Freya Christie (Kazakhstan) Zhibek Kulambayeva	(Kazakhstan) Zhibek Kulambayeva (United States) Caty McNally	(Malta) Francesca Curmi (Bulgaria) Lia Karatancheva (Czech Republic) Anna Sisková (Romania) Irina Bara
May 19	Portorož, Slovenia; Clay; W50; Singles and doubles draws	(Ukraine) Oleksandra Oliynykova; 3–6, 6–2, 6–4	(Sweden) Kajsa Rinaldo Persson	(Argentina) Jazmín Ortenzi (Germany) Caroline Werner	(Slovakia) Viktória Hrunčáková (Turkey) Çağla Büyükakçay (Hungary) Amarissa Tóth (Brazil) Gabriela Cé
May 19	Portorož, Slovenia; Clay; W50; Singles and doubles draws	(United States) Rasheeda McAdoo (Greece) Sapfo Sakellaridi; 6–4, 6–3	(Argentina) Jazmín Ortenzi (Italy) Aurora Zantedeschi	(Argentina) Jazmín Ortenzi (Germany) Caroline Werner	(Slovakia) Viktória Hrunčáková (Turkey) Çağla Büyükakçay (Hungary) Amarissa Tóth (Brazil) Gabriela Cé
May 19	Pelham, United States; Clay; W50; Singles and doubles draws	(Romania) Gabriela Lee; 6–3, 6–1	(United States) Robin Anderson	(United States) Lea Ma (Spain) Alicia Herrero Liñana	(Ukraine) Anita Sahdiieva (Slovakia) Martina Okáľová (Australia) Petra Hule (United States) Victoria Hu
May 19	Pelham, United States; Clay; W50; Singles and doubles draws	(United Kingdom) Madeleine Brooks (Australia) Petra Hule; 6–1, 7–6^{(7–4)}	(Spain) Alicia Herrero Liñana (United States) Anna Rogers	(United States) Lea Ma (Spain) Alicia Herrero Liñana	(Ukraine) Anita Sahdiieva (Slovakia) Martina Okáľová (Australia) Petra Hule (United States) Victoria Hu
May 19	Andong, South Korea; Hard; W35; Singles and doubles draws	(Indonesia) Janice Tjen; 6–4, 6–2	(China) Ma Yexin	(Japan) Misaki Matsuda (China) You Xiaodi	(Chinese Taipei) Lee Ya-hsuan (South Korea) Park So-hyun (South Korea) Back Da-yeon (Japan) Eri Shimizu
May 19	Andong, South Korea; Hard; W35; Singles and doubles draws	(South Korea) Back Da-yeon (South Korea) Lee Eun-hye; 3–6, 6–2, [10–4]	(South Korea) Han Hyeong-ju (South Korea) Kim Eun-chae	(Japan) Misaki Matsuda (China) You Xiaodi	(Chinese Taipei) Lee Ya-hsuan (South Korea) Park So-hyun (South Korea) Back Da-yeon (Japan) Eri Shimizu
May 19	Bol, Croatia; Clay; W35; Singles and doubles draws	(Italy) Giorgia Pedone; 1–6, 6–4, 7–6^{(9–7)}	Anastasia Gasanova	(Romania) Georgia Crăciun (Poland) Weronika Falkowska	(Norway) Malene Helgø (United States) Ashley Lahey (Germany) Katharina Hobgarski (Croatia) Tena Lukas
May 19	Bol, Croatia; Clay; W35; Singles and doubles draws	(Slovakia) Katarína Kužmová (Netherlands) Stéphanie Visscher; 6–4, 1–6, [11–9]	(Brazil) Ana Candiotto; Daria Lodikova	(Romania) Georgia Crăciun (Poland) Weronika Falkowska	(Norway) Malene Helgø (United States) Ashley Lahey (Germany) Katharina Hobgarski (Croatia) Tena Lukas
May 19	Santo Domingo, Dominican Republic; Clay; W35; Singles and doubles draws	(Serbia) Katarina Jokić; 7–6^{(10–8)}, 6–7^{(0–7)}, 6–2	(Greece) Despina Papamichail	(Japan) Haruna Arakawa (Brazil) Thaísa Grana Pedretti	(Italy) Francesca Pace (Belgium) Vicky Van de Peer (Italy) Miriana Tona (United Kingdom) Victoria Allen
May 19	Santo Domingo, Dominican Republic; Clay; W35; Singles and doubles draws	(Italy) Miriana Tona (Bolivia) Noelia Zeballos; 6–0, 6–3	(Italy) Francesca Pace (Poland) Zuzanna Pawlikowska	(Japan) Haruna Arakawa (Brazil) Thaísa Grana Pedretti	(Italy) Francesca Pace (Belgium) Vicky Van de Peer (Italy) Miriana Tona (United Kingdom) Victoria Allen
May 19	Orlando, United States; Clay; W35; Singles and doubles draws	(Switzerland) Jenny Dürst; 6–4, 6–4	(United States) Bella Payne	(Canada) Dasha Plekhanova (United States) Katrina Scott	(United States) Allura Zamarripa (India) Riya Bhatia (United States) Jamilah Snells (United States) Monika Ekstrand
May 19	Orlando, United States; Clay; W35; Singles and doubles draws	(United States) Allura Zamarripa (United States) Maribella Zamarripa; 6–3, 6–1	(Switzerland) Jenny Dürst (Canada) Dasha Plekhanova	(Canada) Dasha Plekhanova (United States) Katrina Scott	(United States) Allura Zamarripa (India) Riya Bhatia (United States) Jamilah Snells (United States) Monika Ekstrand
May 19	Maanshan, China; Hard (i); W15; Singles and doubles draws	(Indonesia) Priska Nugroho; 6–1, 6–2	(Thailand) Peangtarn Plipuech	(China) Yang Yidi (China) Zhang Junhan	(China) Guo Meiqi (China) Wang Jiayi (China) Tian Jialin (China) Liu Fangzhou
May 19	Maanshan, China; Hard (i); W15; Singles and doubles draws	(Kazakhstan) Sandugash Kenzhibayeva; Sofya Lansere; 6–3, 3–6, [10–8]	(China) Guo Meiqi (Thailand) Peangtarn Plipuech	(China) Yang Yidi (China) Zhang Junhan	(China) Guo Meiqi (China) Wang Jiayi (China) Tian Jialin (China) Liu Fangzhou
May 19	Fukui, Japan; Hard; W15; Singles and doubles draws	(Japan) Hayu Kinoshita; 6–1, 6–4	(Japan) Mio Mushika	(Japan) Shiho Tsujioka (Japan) Honoka Kobayashi	(Japan) Honori Koyama (Japan) Nao Nishino (Japan) Sae Noguchi (Japan) Ayumi Miyamoto
May 19	Fukui, Japan; Hard; W15; Singles and doubles draws	(Japan) Yuka Hosoki (Japan) Kisa Yoshioka; 3–6, 7–5, [10–2]	(Japan) Nao Nishino (Japan) Shiho Tsujioka	(Japan) Shiho Tsujioka (Japan) Honoka Kobayashi	(Japan) Honori Koyama (Japan) Nao Nishino (Japan) Sae Noguchi (Japan) Ayumi Miyamoto
May 19	Estepona, Spain; Hard; W15; Singles and doubles draws	(United Kingdom) Ranah Stoiber; 4–6, 7–6^{(7–5)}, 6–4	(United Kingdom) Alice Gillan	(Hong Kong) Adithya Karunaratne (Luxembourg) Marie Weckerle	Evgeniya Burdina (Belgium) Clara Vlasselaer (Spain) Noelia Bouzó Zanotti (Germany) Ida Wobker
May 19	Estepona, Spain; Hard; W15; Singles and doubles draws	(Netherlands) Joy de Zeeuw (Slovakia) Viktória Morvayová; 4–6, 6–1, [10–5]	(Uzbekistan) Vlada Ekshibarova (Belgium) Clara Vlasselaer	(Hong Kong) Adithya Karunaratne (Luxembourg) Marie Weckerle	Evgeniya Burdina (Belgium) Clara Vlasselaer (Spain) Noelia Bouzó Zanotti (Germany) Ida Wobker
May 19	Tsaghkadzor, Armenia; Clay; W15; Singles and doubles draws	Kristina Kroitor; 6–4, 6–4	(Germany) Marie Vogt	(Ukraine) Adriana Tkachenko; Valeriya Yushchenko	Elina Nepliy (United States) Mia Horvit (Lithuania) Iveta Dapkutė (Japan) Kaili Demi Teso
May 19	Tsaghkadzor, Armenia; Clay; W15; Singles and doubles draws	Alina Yuneva; Valeriya Yushchenko; 7–6^{(9–7)}, 6–3	Kira Bataikina; Kristina Kroitor	(Ukraine) Adriana Tkachenko; Valeriya Yushchenko	Elina Nepliy (United States) Mia Horvit (Lithuania) Iveta Dapkutė (Japan) Kaili Demi Teso
May 19	Monastir, Tunisia; Hard; W15; Singles and doubles draws	Ekaterina Khayrutdinova; 6–1, 6–2	(United Kingdom) Katy Dunne	(United States) Kristina Penickova (France) Chloé Noël	(United States) Annika Penickova (Mexico) María Fernanda Navarro Oliva (Zimbabwe) Valeria Bhunu (Slovakia) Tamara Šramková
May 19	Monastir, Tunisia; Hard; W15; Singles and doubles draws	Anastasiia Gureva; Ekaterina Khayrutdinova; 6–1, 6–1	(Zimbabwe) Valeria Bhunu (Tunisia) Lina Soussi	(United States) Kristina Penickova (France) Chloé Noël	(United States) Annika Penickova (Mexico) María Fernanda Navarro Oliva (Zimbabwe) Valeria Bhunu (Slovakia) Tamara Šramková
May 19	Trelew, Argentina; Hard (i); W15; Singles and doubles draws	(Argentina) Victoria Bosio; 7–6^{(7–1)}, 6–4	(Argentina) Martina Capurro Taborda	(Chile) Antonia Vergara Rivera (Ecuador) Camila Romero	(Chile) Fernanda Labraña (United States) Christasha Mcneil (Argentina) Carla Markus (Peru) Romina Ccuno
May 19	Trelew, Argentina; Hard (i); W15; Singles and doubles draws	(Argentina) Luciana Moyano (Ecuador) Camila Romero; 6–1, 6–4	(Argentina) Martina Capurro Taborda (Mexico) Marian Gómez Pezuela Cano	(Chile) Antonia Vergara Rivera (Ecuador) Camila Romero	(Chile) Fernanda Labraña (United States) Christasha Mcneil (Argentina) Carla Markus (Peru) Romina Ccuno
May 26	Internazionali Femminili di Brescia; Brescia, Italy; Clay; W75; Singles and doubles draws	(Slovenia) Kaja Juvan; 7–6^{(7–1)}, 7–5	(Austria) Julia Grabher	(Czech Republic) Dominika Šalková (United States) Caty McNally	(Latvia) Darja Semeņistaja (Australia) Astra Sharma (Japan) Kyōka Okamura (Poland) Maja Chwalińska
May 26	Internazionali Femminili di Brescia; Brescia, Italy; Clay; W75; Singles and doubles draws	(Poland) Maja Chwalińska (Austria) Sinja Kraus; 6–0, 6–3	(Czech Republic) Gabriela Knutson (Latvia) Darja Semeņistaja	(Czech Republic) Dominika Šalková (United States) Caty McNally	(Latvia) Darja Semeņistaja (Australia) Astra Sharma (Japan) Kyōka Okamura (Poland) Maja Chwalińska
May 26	Otočec, Slovenia; Clay; W50; Singles and doubles draws	(Hungary) Amarissa Tóth; 6–3, 6–3	(Belgium) Sofia Costoulas	(Georgia (country)) Ekaterine Gorgodze (United States) Elizabeth Mandlik	(Czech Republic) Barbora Palicová (United States) Carolyn Ansari; Anastasia Tikhonova (Germany) Noma Noha Akugue
May 26	Otočec, Slovenia; Clay; W50; Singles and doubles draws	(Czech Republic) Denisa Hindová (Slovenia) Kristina Novak; 6–3, 3–6, [10–8]	(United States) Carolyn Ansari (Japan) Mana Kawamura	(Georgia (country)) Ekaterine Gorgodze (United States) Elizabeth Mandlik	(Czech Republic) Barbora Palicová (United States) Carolyn Ansari; Anastasia Tikhonova (Germany) Noma Noha Akugue
May 26	Villach, Austria; Clay; W35; Singles and doubles draws	(Germany) Nastasja Schunk; 0–6, 6–3, 2–4 ret.	(Greece) Sapfo Sakellaridi	(Slovakia) Radka Zelníčková (Czech Republic) Laura Samson	(Czech Republic) Julie Štruplová (Italy) Lisa Pigato (Germany) Stephanie Wagner (Germany) Luisa Meyer auf der Heide
May 26	Villach, Austria; Clay; W35; Singles and doubles draws	(Slovenia) Dalila Jakupović (Slovenia) Nika Radišić; 6–4, 6–4	(Netherlands) Jasmijn Gimbrère (United States) Rasheeda McAdoo	(Slovakia) Radka Zelníčková (Czech Republic) Laura Samson	(Czech Republic) Julie Štruplová (Italy) Lisa Pigato (Germany) Stephanie Wagner (Germany) Luisa Meyer auf der Heide
May 26	Bol, Croatia; Clay; W35; Singles and doubles draws	(Spain) Ariana Geerlings; 6–2, 6–2	(Romania) Georgia Crăciun	(Croatia) Sara Svetac; Anastasia Gasanova	(Italy) Giorgia Pedone (Romania) Ilinca Amariei (Italy) Vittoria Paganetti (Bosnia and Herzegovina) Suana Tucaković
May 26	Bol, Croatia; Clay; W35; Singles and doubles draws	(Romania) Ilinca Amariei (Brazil) Ana Candiotto; 7–6^{(9–7)}, 6–2	(Croatia) Mariana Dražić; Anastasia Gasanova	(Croatia) Sara Svetac; Anastasia Gasanova	(Italy) Giorgia Pedone (Romania) Ilinca Amariei (Italy) Vittoria Paganetti (Bosnia and Herzegovina) Suana Tucaković
May 26	Kuršumlijska Banja, Serbia; Clay; W35; Singles and doubles draws	(North Macedonia) Lina Gjorcheska; 2–6, 6–0, 6–4	(Greece) Martha Matoula	(Bulgaria) Lia Karatancheva (Kazakhstan) Zhibek Kulambayeva	(Serbia) Mia Ristić; Alevtina Ibragimova; Arina Bulatova; Anastasia Zolotareva
May 26	Kuršumlijska Banja, Serbia; Clay; W35; Singles and doubles draws	Arina Bulatova; Ekaterina Kazionova; 6–3, 7–6^{(7–4)}	(Colombia) María Herazo González (Serbia) Draginja Vuković	(Bulgaria) Lia Karatancheva (Kazakhstan) Zhibek Kulambayeva	(Serbia) Mia Ristić; Alevtina Ibragimova; Arina Bulatova; Anastasia Zolotareva
May 26	Santo Domingo, Dominican Republic; Clay; W35; Singles and doubles draws	(Czech Republic) Darja Viďmanová; 6–1, 6–1	(Mexico) Ana Sofía Sánchez	(Italy) Camilla Zanolini (Brazil) Thaísa Grana Pedretti	(Australia) Melisa Ercan (Italy) Francesca Pace (Italy) Miriana Tona (Canada) Cadence Brace
May 26	Santo Domingo, Dominican Republic; Clay; W35; Singles and doubles draws	(Italy) Miriana Tona (Bolivia) Noelia Zeballos; 6–4, 6–3	(Italy) Francesca Pace (Poland) Zuzanna Pawlikowska	(Italy) Camilla Zanolini (Brazil) Thaísa Grana Pedretti	(Australia) Melisa Ercan (Italy) Francesca Pace (Italy) Miriana Tona (Canada) Cadence Brace
May 26	Daegu, South Korea; Hard; W15; Singles and doubles draws	(South Korea) Back Da-yeon; 5–6 ret.	(South Korea) Lee Eun-hye	(South Korea) Jang Gaeul (South Korea) Kim Da-bin	(United States) Carol Young Suh Lee (South Korea) Im Hee-rae (South Korea) Ku Yeon-woo (South Korea) Choi On-yu
May 26	Daegu, South Korea; Hard; W15; Singles and doubles draws	(South Korea) Back Da-yeon (South Korea) Lee Eun-hye; 6–1, 6–1	(South Korea) Kim Da-bin (South Korea) Ku Yeon-woo	(South Korea) Jang Gaeul (South Korea) Kim Da-bin	(United States) Carol Young Suh Lee (South Korea) Im Hee-rae (South Korea) Ku Yeon-woo (South Korea) Choi On-yu
May 26	Maanshan, China; Hard (i); W15; Singles and doubles draws	(China) Guo Meiqi; 5–3 ret.	(China) Liu Fangzhou	(China) Yuan Chengyiyi (China) Wang Jiayi	(Thailand) Kamonwan Yodpetch (Australia) Stefani Webb (Thailand) Peangtarn Plipuech (China) Xu Shilin
May 26	Maanshan, China; Hard (i); W15; Singles and doubles draws	(Thailand) Peangtarn Plipuech (China) Wang Jiaqi; 6–3, 3–6, [10–5]	Anastasia Grechkina; Kristiana Sidorova	(China) Yuan Chengyiyi (China) Wang Jiayi	(Thailand) Kamonwan Yodpetch (Australia) Stefani Webb (Thailand) Peangtarn Plipuech (China) Xu Shilin
May 26	Vall de Uxó, Spain; Clay; W15; Singles and doubles draws	(Spain) Ruth Roura Llaverias; 6–2, 6–3	(Poland) Marcelina Podlińska	(Spain) Juliana Giaccio (Hungary) Adrienn Nagy	(Spain) Raquel González Vilar (Morocco) Yasmine Kabbaj (Poland) Anna Hertel (United States) Shannon Lam
May 26	Vall de Uxó, Spain; Clay; W15; Singles and doubles draws	(Poland) Anna Hertel (Hungary) Adrienn Nagy; 6–4, 6–1	(Italy) Enola Chiesa (France) Marine Szostak	(Spain) Juliana Giaccio (Hungary) Adrienn Nagy	(Spain) Raquel González Vilar (Morocco) Yasmine Kabbaj (Poland) Anna Hertel (United States) Shannon Lam
May 26	Merzig, Germany; Clay; W15; Singles and doubles draws	(Germany) Tessa Johanna Brockmann; 6–4, 6–0	(Germany) Valentina Steiner	(Netherlands) Anouck Vrancken Peeters (Romania) Ștefania Bojică	(Belgium) Tamila Gadamauri (Czech Republic) Michaela Bayerlová (Germany) Gina Marie Dittmann (Czech Republic) Ivana Šebestová
May 26	Merzig, Germany; Clay; W15; Singles and doubles draws	(Switzerland) Chelsea Fontenel (France) Tiphanie Lemaître; 6–3, 6–3	(Czech Republic) Ivana Šebestová (Romania) Arina Vasilescu	(Netherlands) Anouck Vrancken Peeters (Romania) Ștefania Bojică	(Belgium) Tamila Gadamauri (Czech Republic) Michaela Bayerlová (Germany) Gina Marie Dittmann (Czech Republic) Ivana Šebestová
May 26	Kayseri, Turkiye; Hard; W15; Singles and doubles draws	(Poland) Martyna Kubka; 7–5, 6–2	(Colombia) Valentina Mediorreal	(Turkey) Duru Söke (Turkey) Ilay Yörük	(Latvia) Adelina Lachinova (Georgia (country)) Zoziya Kardava; Maria Kalyakina (Slovakia) Viktória Morvayová
May 26	Kayseri, Turkiye; Hard; W15; Singles and doubles draws	(Turkey) Duru Söke (Turkey) Doğa Türkmen; 6–2, 7–6^{(7–4)}	(Colombia) Valentina Mediorreal (Iran) Meshkatolzahra Safi	(Turkey) Duru Söke (Turkey) Ilay Yörük	(Latvia) Adelina Lachinova (Georgia (country)) Zoziya Kardava; Maria Kalyakina (Slovakia) Viktória Morvayová
May 26	Monastir, Tunisia; Hard; W15; Singles and doubles draws	(United States) Hibah Shaikh; 7–5, 6–2	(United Kingdom) Alicia Dudeney	(France) Yasmine Mansouri (Lithuania) Patricija Paukštytė	Polina Leykina (Austria) Arabella Koller (Czech Republic) Zdena Šafářová (Italy) Isabella Maria Șerban
May 26	Monastir, Tunisia; Hard; W15; Singles and doubles draws	(United Kingdom) Alicia Dudeney (Lithuania) Patricija Paukštytė; 6–0, 6–4	(Slovakia) Mia Chudejová; Polina Leykina	(France) Yasmine Mansouri (Lithuania) Patricija Paukštytė	Polina Leykina (Austria) Arabella Koller (Czech Republic) Zdena Šafářová (Italy) Isabella Maria Șerban
May 26	San Diego, United States; Hard; W15; Singles and doubles draws	(United Kingdom) Katie Swan; 6–4, 6–0	(Serbia) Dejana Radanović	(Japan) Mao Mushika (United States) Claire Hill	(United States) Claire An (Poland) Stefania Rogozińska Dzik (Ukraine) Anita Sahdiieva (United States) Olivia Center
May 26	San Diego, United States; Hard; W15; Singles and doubles draws	(United States) Haley Giavara (Ukraine) Anita Sahdiieva; 6–1, 6–3	(Australia) Lily Fairclough (Australia) Lily Taylor	(Japan) Mao Mushika (United States) Claire Hill	(United States) Claire An (Poland) Stefania Rogozińska Dzik (Ukraine) Anita Sahdiieva (United States) Olivia Center

=== June ===
Week of	Tournament	Winner	Runners-up	Semifinalists	Quarterfinalists
June 2	Internazionali Femminili di Tennis Città di Caserta; Caserta, Italy; Clay; W75; Singles and doubles draws	(Spain) Andrea Lázaro García; 4–6, 6–3, 6–0	(France) Alice Ramé	(Italy) Camilla Rosatello (France) Tiantsoa Rakotomanga Rajaonah	(Italy) Alessandra Mazzola (Italy) Silvia Ambrosio (Brazil) Carolina Alves (Spain) Marina Bassols Ribera
June 2	Internazionali Femminili di Tennis Città di Caserta; Caserta, Italy; Clay; W75; Singles and doubles draws	(Chinese Taipei) Cho I-hsuan (Chinese Taipei) Cho Yi-tsen; 6–3, 7–6^{(7–5)}	(Spain) Ariana Geerlings (Japan) Wakana Sonobe	(Italy) Camilla Rosatello (France) Tiantsoa Rakotomanga Rajaonah	(Italy) Alessandra Mazzola (Italy) Silvia Ambrosio (Brazil) Carolina Alves (Spain) Marina Bassols Ribera
June 2	Palmetto Pro Open; Sumter, United States; Hard; W75; Singles and doubles draws	(Czech Republic) Darja Viďmanová; 7–5, 6–1	(Canada) Cadence Brace	(United States) Mary Stoiana (Canada) Katherine Sebov	(India) Shrivalli Bhamidipaty (Japan) Ena Koike (United States) Jaeda Daniel (United States) DJ Bennett
June 2	Palmetto Pro Open; Sumter, United States; Hard; W75; Singles and doubles draws	(United Kingdom) Tara Moore (United States) Abigail Rencheli; 7–5, 6–2	(Chinese Taipei) Liang En-shuo (China) Ma Yexin	(United States) Mary Stoiana (Canada) Katherine Sebov	(India) Shrivalli Bhamidipaty (Japan) Ena Koike (United States) Jaeda Daniel (United States) DJ Bennett
June 2	Troisdorf, Germany; Clay; W50; Singles and doubles draws	(United States) Alexis Blokhina; 6–3, 2–6, 6–3	(Germany) Anna-Lena Friedsam	(United States) Elizabeth Mandlik (Romania) Oana Georgeta Simion	(Germany) Josy Daems (Germany) Noma Noha Akugue (Germany) Mara Guth (Germany) Marie Vogt
June 2	Troisdorf, Germany; Clay; W50; Singles and doubles draws	(United States) Rasheeda McAdoo (Kenya) Angella Okutoyi; 6–1, 6–1	(Germany) Josy Daems (Ukraine) Anastasiia Firman	(United States) Elizabeth Mandlik (Romania) Oana Georgeta Simion	(Germany) Josy Daems (Germany) Noma Noha Akugue (Germany) Mara Guth (Germany) Marie Vogt
June 2	Montemor-o-Novo, Portugal; Hard; W50; Singles and doubles draws	(Portugal) Matilde Jorge; 6–1, 6–3	(Portugal) Francisca Jorge	(United States) Hina Inoue (Slovakia) Viktória Hrunčáková	Polina Iatcenko (United States) Ellie Schoppe; Aliona Falei (Lithuania) Iveta Dapkutė
June 2	Montemor-o-Novo, Portugal; Hard; W50; Singles and doubles draws	Aliona Falei; Polina Iatcenko; 6–3, 7–5	(Lithuania) Iveta Dapkutė (Poland) Weronika Ewald	(United States) Hina Inoue (Slovakia) Viktória Hrunčáková	Polina Iatcenko (United States) Ellie Schoppe; Aliona Falei (Lithuania) Iveta Dapkutė
June 2	Klagenfurt, Austria; Clay; W35; Singles and doubles draws	(Spain) Kaitlin Quevedo; 6–4, 6–4	(Serbia) Mia Ristić	(Czech Republic) Aneta Laboutková (Finland) Laura Hietaranta	(Czech Republic) Laura Samson (Czech Republic) Julie Štruplová (Netherlands) Jasmijn Gimbrère (Austria) Ekaterina Perelygina
June 2	Klagenfurt, Austria; Clay; W35; Singles and doubles draws	(Czech Republic) Aneta Laboutková (Czech Republic) Julie Štruplová; 4–6, 7–6^{(7–4)}, [11–9]	(Italy) Anastasia Abbagnato; Daria Lodikova	(Czech Republic) Aneta Laboutková (Finland) Laura Hietaranta	(Czech Republic) Laura Samson (Czech Republic) Julie Štruplová (Netherlands) Jasmijn Gimbrère (Austria) Ekaterina Perelygina
June 2	Santo Domingo, Dominican Republic; Hard; W35; Singles and doubles draws	(Bosnia and Herzegovina) Ema Burgić; 6–2 ,5–7, 6–2	(Poland) Zuzanna Pawlikowska	(Argentina) Victoria Bosio (United States) Sara Daavettila	(Chile) Fernanda Labraña (United States) Adriana Reami (Bolivia) Noelia Zeballos (Japan) Hiroko Kuwata
June 2	Santo Domingo, Dominican Republic; Hard; W35; Singles and doubles draws	(Japan) Hiroko Kuwata (India) Sahaja Yamalapalli; 6–3, 6–2	(United Kingdom) Esther Adeshina (Venezuela) Sofía Elena Cabezas Domínguez	(Argentina) Victoria Bosio (United States) Sara Daavettila	(Chile) Fernanda Labraña (United States) Adriana Reami (Bolivia) Noelia Zeballos (Japan) Hiroko Kuwata
June 2	Osaka, Japan; Hard; W15; Singles and doubles draws	(Japan) Saki Imamura; 6–4, 6–1	(Australia) Stefani Webb	(Japan) Kayo Nishimura (South Korea) Cherry Kim	(South Korea) Kim Yu-jin (Japan) Nagi Hanatani (Japan) Lisa-Marie Rioux (Japan) Nao Nishino
June 2	Osaka, Japan; Hard; W15; Singles and doubles draws	(Japan) Miyu Nakashima (Japan) Sera Nishimoto; 6–2, 6–3	(Japan) Yuka Hosoki (Japan) Natsuki Yoshimoto	(Japan) Kayo Nishimura (South Korea) Cherry Kim	(South Korea) Kim Yu-jin (Japan) Nagi Hanatani (Japan) Lisa-Marie Rioux (Japan) Nao Nishino
June 2	Maanshan, China; Hard (i); W15; Singles and doubles draws	(Indonesia) Janice Tjen; 6–4, 6–1	Kira Pavlova	(China) Yang Yidi; Sofya Lansere	Kristiana Sidorova (China) Ren Yufei (China) Zhang Junhan (China) Yuan Chengyiyi
June 2	Maanshan, China; Hard (i); W15; Singles and doubles draws	Anastasia Grechkina; Kristiana Sidorova; 6–3, 2–6, [10–6]	(Indonesia) Priska Nugroho (Indonesia) Janice Tjen	(China) Yang Yidi; Sofya Lansere	Kristiana Sidorova (China) Ren Yufei (China) Zhang Junhan (China) Yuan Chengyiyi
June 2	Tashkent, Uzbekistan; Hard; W15; Singles and doubles draws	Varvara Panshina; 6–2, 6–4	(India) Vaishnavi Adkar	Ksenia Laskutova (Uzbekistan) Daria Shubina	(India) Akanksha Dileep Nitture (United States) Mia Horvit (South Korea) Jeong Bo-young; Ustiniya Lekomtseva
June 2	Tashkent, Uzbekistan; Hard; W15; Singles and doubles draws	Daria Khomutsianskaya; Daria Zelinskaya; 6–4, 6–4	(India) Vaishnavi Adkar (Thailand) Punnin Kovapitukted	Ksenia Laskutova (Uzbekistan) Daria Shubina	(India) Akanksha Dileep Nitture (United States) Mia Horvit (South Korea) Jeong Bo-young; Ustiniya Lekomtseva
June 2	Focșani, Romania; Clay; W15; Singles and doubles draws	(Spain) Ruth Roura Llaverias; 7–6^{(7–4)}, 7–6^{(7–5)}	(Greece) Valentini Grammatikopoulou	(Romania) Andreea Prisăcariu (Romania) Eva Maria Ionescu	(Romania) Bianca Bărbulescu (Romania) Simona Ogescu (Spain) Lucia Natal (Romania) Ioana Teodora Sava
June 2	Focșani, Romania; Clay; W15; Singles and doubles draws	(Romania) Cara Maria Meșter (Romania) Vanessa Popa Teiuşanu; 6–3, 6–4	(Romania) Alexandra Irina Anghel (Romania) Patricia Georgiana Goina	(Romania) Andreea Prisăcariu (Romania) Eva Maria Ionescu	(Romania) Bianca Bărbulescu (Romania) Simona Ogescu (Spain) Lucia Natal (Romania) Ioana Teodora Sava
June 2	Kuršumlijska Banja, Serbia; Clay; W15; Singles and doubles draws	Anastasia Zolotareva; 7–5, 2–6, 7–5	Alexandra Shubladze	(Chile) Antonia Vergara Rivera (Czech Republic) Lucie Havlíčková	Valeriya Yushchenko (Argentina) Julieta Estable (Serbia) Anja Stanković; Milana Zhabrailova
June 2	Kuršumlijska Banja, Serbia; Clay; W15; Singles and doubles draws	Alexandra Shubladze; Anastasia Zolotareva; 6–3, 6–2	Alina Yuneva; Valeriya Yushchenko	(Chile) Antonia Vergara Rivera (Czech Republic) Lucie Havlíčková	Valeriya Yushchenko (Argentina) Julieta Estable (Serbia) Anja Stanković; Milana Zhabrailova
June 2	Banja Luka, Bosnia and Herzegovina; Clay; W15; Singles and doubles draws	(Germany) Emily Seibold; 6–3, 6–1	(Bosnia and Herzegovina) Suana Tucaković	(Serbia) Andrea Obradović (United States) Lilian Poling	(Ukraine) Anastasiya Zaparyniuk (Switzerland) Katerina Tsygourova (Germany) Eva Marie Voracek (Czech Republic) Amelie Justine Hejtmanek
June 2	Banja Luka, Bosnia and Herzegovina; Clay; W15; Singles and doubles draws	(Czech Republic) Amelie Justine Hejtmanek (Germany) Eva Marie Voracek; 7–6^{(10–8)}, 6–3	(United States) Julia Adams (United States) Lilian Poling	(Serbia) Andrea Obradović (United States) Lilian Poling	(Ukraine) Anastasiya Zaparyniuk (Switzerland) Katerina Tsygourova (Germany) Eva Marie Voracek (Czech Republic) Amelie Justine Hejtmanek
June 2	Osijek, Croatia; Clay; W15; Singles and doubles draws	(Hungary) Luca Udvardy; 3–6, 6–2, 6–3	(Slovakia) Eszter Méri	(Italy) Verena Meliss (Poland) Anna Hertel	(Slovenia) Ela Nala Milić (Slovakia) Salma Drugdová (Italy) Enola Chiesa (United States) Carolyn Ansari
June 2	Osijek, Croatia; Clay; W15; Singles and doubles draws	(Slovakia) Nikola Daubnerová; Anna Zyryanova; 7–6^{(7–3)}, 3–6, [10–4]	(Italy) Enola Chiesa (Czech Republic) Linda Ševčíková	(Italy) Verena Meliss (Poland) Anna Hertel	(Slovenia) Ela Nala Milić (Slovakia) Salma Drugdová (Italy) Enola Chiesa (United States) Carolyn Ansari
June 2	Kayseri, Turkiye; Hard; W15; Singles and doubles draws	(Latvia) Adelina Lachinova; 6–4, 6–1	(Australia) Alana Subasic	(Colombia) Valentina Mediorreal (Georgia (country)) Zoziya Kardava	(Turkey) Ayşegül Mert; Julia Khramtsova (Ukraine) Elena Grekul (United Kingdom) Jasmine Conway
June 2	Kayseri, Turkiye; Hard; W15; Singles and doubles draws	(United Kingdom) Jasmine Conway (Iran) Meshkatolzahra Safi; 2–6, 6–4, [10–3]	(United States) Jamilah Snells (Turkey) Duru Söke	(Colombia) Valentina Mediorreal (Georgia (country)) Zoziya Kardava	(Turkey) Ayşegül Mert; Julia Khramtsova (Ukraine) Elena Grekul (United Kingdom) Jasmine Conway
June 2	Monastir, Tunisia; Hard; W15; Singles and doubles draws	(Lithuania) Patricija Paukštytė; 6–0, 5–7, 6–3	(Egypt) Lamis Alhussein Abdel Aziz	(France) Yasmine Mansouri (Benin) Gloriana Nahum	(Czech Republic) Zdena Šafářová (Cameroon) Karine Marion Job (Italy) Noemi Maines (Germany) Anja Wildgruber
June 2	Monastir, Tunisia; Hard; W15; Singles and doubles draws	(France) Astrid Cirotte (Lithuania) Patricija Paukštytė; 6–4, 6–1	(Egypt) Lamis Alhussein Abdel Aziz (Germany) Anja Wildgruber	(France) Yasmine Mansouri (Benin) Gloriana Nahum	(Czech Republic) Zdena Šafářová (Cameroon) Karine Marion Job (Italy) Noemi Maines (Germany) Anja Wildgruber
June 2	San Diego, United States; Hard; W15; Singles and doubles draws	(Australia) Lily Taylor; 5–7, 6–2, 6–1	(United States) Aspen Schuman	(Japan) Mao Mushika (United States) Jo-yee Chan	(Serbia) Dejana Radanović (Ukraine) Anita Sahdiieva (United States) Patsy Daughters (United States) Marcella Cruz
June 2	San Diego, United States; Hard; W15; Singles and doubles draws	(Australia) Lily Fairclough (Ukraine) Anita Sahdiieva; 6–2, 6–1	(Japan) Mao Mushika (United States) Kristina Nordikyan	(Japan) Mao Mushika (United States) Jo-yee Chan	(Serbia) Dejana Radanović (Ukraine) Anita Sahdiieva (United States) Patsy Daughters (United States) Marcella Cruz
June 9	Open de Biarritz; Biarritz, France; Clay; W100; Singles and doubles draws	(Egypt) Mayar Sherif; 7–5, 6–4	(France) Tiantsoa Rakotomanga Rajaonah	(Belgium) Sofia Costoulas (France) Julie Belgraver	(Spain) Irene Burillo Escorihuela (France) Eleejah Inisan (France) Fiona Ferro (Italy) Silvia Ambrosio
June 9	Open de Biarritz; Biarritz, France; Clay; W100; Singles and doubles draws	(Spain) Irene Burillo Escorihuela (Mexico) María Portillo Ramírez; 4–6, 6–1, [10–5]	(United States) Jessie Aney (Lithuania) Justina Mikulskytė	(Belgium) Sofia Costoulas (France) Julie Belgraver	(Spain) Irene Burillo Escorihuela (France) Eleejah Inisan (France) Fiona Ferro (Italy) Silvia Ambrosio
June 9	Macha Lake Open; Česká Lípa, Czechia; Clay; W75; Singles and doubles draws	(Czech Republic) Laura Samson; 2–6, 6–2, 6–3	(Brazil) Carolina Alves	(China) Guo Hanyu (Italy) Aurora Zantedeschi	(Czech Republic) Sarah Melany Fajmonová (Czech Republic) Aneta Kučmová (Czech Republic) Nikola Bartůňková (Romania) Gabriela Lee
June 9	Macha Lake Open; Česká Lípa, Czechia; Clay; W75; Singles and doubles draws	(Czech Republic) Alena Kovačková (Czech Republic) Ivana Šebestová; 1–6, 7–5, [10–5]	(Bulgaria) Lia Karatancheva (Czech Republic) Aneta Kučmová	(China) Guo Hanyu (Italy) Aurora Zantedeschi	(Czech Republic) Sarah Melany Fajmonová (Czech Republic) Aneta Kučmová (Czech Republic) Nikola Bartůňková (Romania) Gabriela Lee
June 9	Guimarães Ladies Open; Guimarães, Portugal; Hard; W50; Singles and doubles draws	(Portugal) Francisca Jorge; 5–7, 6–2, 6–2	(Portugal) Matilde Jorge	Polina Iatcenko (United States) Clervie Ngounoue	(United States) Hina Inoue (Finland) Anastasia Kulikova (Japan) Hiromi Abe (France) Alice Robbe
June 9	Guimarães Ladies Open; Guimarães, Portugal; Hard; W50; Singles and doubles draws	(India) Ankita Raina (France) Alice Robbe; 1–6, 6–4, [10–8]	(Japan) Hiromi Abe (Japan) Kanako Morisaki	Polina Iatcenko (United States) Clervie Ngounoue	(United States) Hina Inoue (Finland) Anastasia Kulikova (Japan) Hiromi Abe (France) Alice Robbe
June 9	Luzhou, China; Hard; W35; Singles and doubles draws	(Indonesia) Janice Tjen; 6–0, 6–4	(China) Liu Fangzhou	(China) Wang Meiling (China) You Xiaodi	(Japan) Ayumi Koshiishi (Japan) Momoko Kobori (Japan) Saki Imamura (China) Yang Yidi
June 9	Luzhou, China; Hard; W35; Singles and doubles draws	(Indonesia) Priska Nugroho (Indonesia) Janice Tjen; 6–4, 6–3	(Japan) Saki Imamura (Japan) Ikumi Yamazaki	(China) Wang Meiling (China) You Xiaodi	(Japan) Ayumi Koshiishi (Japan) Momoko Kobori (Japan) Saki Imamura (China) Yang Yidi
June 9	Santo Domingo, Dominican Republic; Hard; W35; Singles and doubles draws	(Mexico) Ana Sofía Sánchez; 7–6^{(7–3)}, 6–3	(United States) Rachel Gailis	(United States) Sara Daavettila (United States) Victoria Hu	(Argentina) Victoria Bosio (Bulgaria) Gergana Topalova (Chile) Fernanda Labraña (India) Sahaja Yamalapalli
June 9	Santo Domingo, Dominican Republic; Hard; W35; Singles and doubles draws	(Brazil) Júlia Konishi Camargo Silva (Argentina) Candela Vázquez; 7–6^{(7–3)}, 4–6, [10–8]	(United Kingdom) Esther Adeshina (Venezuela) Sofía Elena Cabezas Domínguez	(United States) Sara Daavettila (United States) Victoria Hu	(Argentina) Victoria Bosio (Bulgaria) Gergana Topalova (Chile) Fernanda Labraña (India) Sahaja Yamalapalli
June 9	Decatur, United States; Hard; W35; Singles and doubles draws	(United States) Fiona Crawley; 7–6^{(7–5)}, 6–4	(Canada) Dasha Plekhanova	(United Kingdom) Katie Swan (Japan) Mayu Crossley	(United States) Jaeda Daniel (Slovakia) Martina Okáľová (Canada) Cadence Brace (United States) Ava Markham
June 9	Decatur, United States; Hard; W35; Singles and doubles draws	(United States) Susanna Maltby (United States) Maddy Zampardo; 5–7, 7–5, [10–7]	(United States) Jaeda Daniel (United States) Salma Ewing	(United Kingdom) Katie Swan (Japan) Mayu Crossley	(United States) Jaeda Daniel (Slovakia) Martina Okáľová (Canada) Cadence Brace (United States) Ava Markham
June 9	Tashkent, Uzbekistan; Hard; W15; Singles and doubles draws	(Lithuania) Laima Vladson; 7–5, 7–5	Varvara Panshina	(South Korea) Ahn Yu-jin; Vlada Zvereva	Ekaterina Reyngold (India) Akanksha Dileep Nitture (United States) Mia Horvit; Daria Zelinskaya
June 9	Tashkent, Uzbekistan; Hard; W15; Singles and doubles draws	Daria Khomutsianskaya; Daria Zelinskaya; 4–6, 6–1, [11–9]	(Thailand) Punnin Kovapitukted; Ksenia Laskutova	(South Korea) Ahn Yu-jin; Vlada Zvereva	Ekaterina Reyngold (India) Akanksha Dileep Nitture (United States) Mia Horvit; Daria Zelinskaya
June 9	Madrid, Spain; Clay; W15; Singles and doubles draws	(Switzerland) Alina Granwehr; 6–3, 6–2	(China) Geng Xinle	(Bulgaria) Elizara Yaneva (Germany) Emily Seibold	(Argentina) Luisina Giovannini (Kenya) Angella Okutoyi (Switzerland) Katerina Tsygourova (Spain) Maria de la Paz Alberto
June 9	Madrid, Spain; Clay; W15; Singles and doubles draws	(Kenya) Angella Okutoyi (Italy) Sofia Rocchetti; 6–2, 6–3	(Israel) Mika Buchnik (Argentina) Sol Ailin Larraya Guidi	(Bulgaria) Elizara Yaneva (Germany) Emily Seibold	(Argentina) Luisina Giovannini (Kenya) Angella Okutoyi (Switzerland) Katerina Tsygourova (Spain) Maria de la Paz Alberto
June 9	Norges-la-Ville, France; Hard; W15; Singles and doubles draws	(France) Léa Tholey; 7–6^{(9–7)}, 6–4	(France) Chloé Noël	(Switzerland) Fiona Ganz (Italy) Enola Chiesa	(Bosnia and Herzegovina) Hena Cehajic (Latvia) Diāna Marcinkēviča (United States) Malkia Ngounoue; Vlada Mincheva
June 9	Norges-la-Ville, France; Hard; W15; Singles and doubles draws	(United States) Malkia Ngounoue (United States) Monika Wojcik; 6–3, 4–6, [10–7]	(France) Séverine Deppner (France) Chloé Noël	(Switzerland) Fiona Ganz (Italy) Enola Chiesa	(Bosnia and Herzegovina) Hena Cehajic (Latvia) Diāna Marcinkēviča (United States) Malkia Ngounoue; Vlada Mincheva
June 9	Gdańsk, Poland; Clay; W15; Singles and doubles draws	(Denmark) Johanne Svendsen; 4–6, 6–2, 7–6^{(13–11)}	(Germany) Luisa Meyer auf der Heide	(Netherlands) Madelief Hageman (Poland) Inka Wawrzkiewicz	(Argentina) Paula Ormaechea (Poland) Anna Hertel (New Zealand) Valentina Ivanov (Finland) Clarissa Blomqvist
June 9	Gdańsk, Poland; Clay; W15; Singles and doubles draws	(New Zealand) Valentina Ivanov (Denmark) Johanne Svendsen; 7–5, 3–6, [12–10]	(Poland) Nadia Affelt (Poland) Inka Wawrzkiewicz	(Netherlands) Madelief Hageman (Poland) Inka Wawrzkiewicz	(Argentina) Paula Ormaechea (Poland) Anna Hertel (New Zealand) Valentina Ivanov (Finland) Clarissa Blomqvist
June 9	Kuršumlijska Banja, Serbia; Clay; W15; Singles and doubles draws	(Romania) Ștefania Bojică; Walkover	(Argentina) María Florencia Urrutia	(Romania) Maria Sara Popa (Colombia) María Herazo González	(Chile) Camila Rodero; Anastasia Zolotareva (Serbia) Elena Milovanović (Greece) Elena Korokozidi
June 9	Kuršumlijska Banja, Serbia; Clay; W15; Singles and doubles draws	(Argentina) Julieta Estable (Argentina) María Florencia Urrutia; 6–1, 6–7^{(3–7)}, [10–5]	(Spain) Ana Giraldi Requena (Colombia) María Herazo González	(Romania) Maria Sara Popa (Colombia) María Herazo González	(Chile) Camila Rodero; Anastasia Zolotareva (Serbia) Elena Milovanović (Greece) Elena Korokozidi
June 9	Kayseri, Turkiye; Hard; W15; Singles and doubles draws	(Turkey) Ayşegül Mert; 2–6, 7–5, 7–5	(Ukraine) Kateryna Lazarenko	(Turkey) Ada Kumru (Australia) Alana Subasic	(Georgia (country)) Zoziya Kardava; Edda Mamedova (Turkey) Duru Söke (United Kingdom) Jasmine Conway
June 9	Kayseri, Turkiye; Hard; W15; Singles and doubles draws	(Colombia) Valentina Mediorreal (Turkey) Doğa Türkmen; 7–6^{(7–5)}, 6–7^{(3–7)}, [10–5]	(United Kingdom) Jasmine Conway (Turkey) Ayşegül Mert	(Turkey) Ada Kumru (Australia) Alana Subasic	(Georgia (country)) Zoziya Kardava; Edda Mamedova (Turkey) Duru Söke (United Kingdom) Jasmine Conway
June 9	Monastir, Tunisia; Hard; W15; Singles and doubles draws	(United States) Sofia Rojas; 6–3, 4–6, 7–6^{(7–4)}	(France) Astrid Cirotte	(Benin) Gloriana Nahum (Australia) Tahlia Kokkinis	(France) Yasmine Mansouri (India) Zeel Desai (France) Alice Battesti (Egypt) Lamis Alhussein Abdel Aziz
June 9	Monastir, Tunisia; Hard; W15; Singles and doubles draws	(United States) Lilian Poling (Czech Republic) Zdena Šafářová; 6–2, 7–5	(Spain) Claudia Ferrer Pérez (Hong Kong) Adithya Karunaratne	(Benin) Gloriana Nahum (Australia) Tahlia Kokkinis	(France) Yasmine Mansouri (India) Zeel Desai (France) Alice Battesti (Egypt) Lamis Alhussein Abdel Aziz
June 9	San Diego, United States; Hard; W15; Singles and doubles draws	(Japan) Mao Mushika; 7–5, 6–3	(United States) Alyssa Ahn	(United States) Tianmei Wang (Poland) Stefania Rogozińska Dzik	Veronica Miroshnichenko (Japan) Mio Mushika (Ukraine) Anita Sahdiieva (Turkey) Selina Atay
June 9	San Diego, United States; Hard; W15; Singles and doubles draws	(Australia) Lily Fairclough (Australia) Lily Taylor; 2–6, 6–2, [10–4]	(United States) Kristina Nordikyan (Ukraine) Anita Sahdiieva	(United States) Tianmei Wang (Poland) Stefania Rogozińska Dzik	Veronica Miroshnichenko (Japan) Mio Mushika (Ukraine) Anita Sahdiieva (Turkey) Selina Atay
June 16	Internationaux de Tennis de Blois; Blois, France; Clay; W75; Singles and doubles draws	(Hungary) Panna Udvardy; 7–5, 6–3	(France) Julie Belgraver	(Spain) Ángela Fita Boluda (Brazil) Laura Pigossi	(France) Mathilde Lollia (Spain) Aliona Bolsova (France) Alice Ramé (Italy) Jessica Pieri
June 16	Internationaux de Tennis de Blois; Blois, France; Clay; W75; Singles and doubles draws	(Chinese Taipei) Cho I-hsuan (Chinese Taipei) Cho Yi-tsen; 7–5, 4–6, [10–5]	(Spain) Ángela Fita Boluda (Brazil) Laura Pigossi	(Spain) Ángela Fita Boluda (Brazil) Laura Pigossi	(France) Mathilde Lollia (Spain) Aliona Bolsova (France) Alice Ramé (Italy) Jessica Pieri
June 16	Zagreb Ladies Open; Zagreb, Croatia; Clay; W75; Singles - Doubles	(Czech Republic) Dominika Šalková; 2–6, 6–3, 6–3	(Croatia) Tara Würth	(Italy) Tyra Caterina Grant (Italy) Samira De Stefano	(Sweden) Kajsa Rinaldo Persson; Ekaterina Makarova (Argentina) Julia Riera (France) Séléna Janicijevic
June 16	Zagreb Ladies Open; Zagreb, Croatia; Clay; W75; Singles - Doubles	(China) Feng Shuo (Japan) Aoi Ito; 7–5, 6–3	Arina Bulatova (Greece) Martha Matoula	(Italy) Tyra Caterina Grant (Italy) Samira De Stefano	(Sweden) Kajsa Rinaldo Persson; Ekaterina Makarova (Argentina) Julia Riera (France) Séléna Janicijevic
June 16	Taizhou, China; Hard; W50; Singles and doubles draws	(Indonesia) Janice Tjen; 7–5, 6–3	(China) Yang Yidi	(Hong Kong) Eudice Chong (United States) Carol Young Suh Lee	(China) Zhang Junhan (Japan) Saki Imamura (China) Liu Fangzhou (China) You Xiaodi
June 16	Taizhou, China; Hard; W50; Singles and doubles draws	(Indonesia) Priska Nugroho (Indonesia) Janice Tjen; 6–3, 6–4	(China) Huang Yujia (China) Zheng Wushuang	(Hong Kong) Eudice Chong (United States) Carol Young Suh Lee	(China) Zhang Junhan (Japan) Saki Imamura (China) Liu Fangzhou (China) You Xiaodi
June 16	Taipei, Taiwan; Hard; W35; Singles and doubles draws	(South Korea) Ku Yeon-woo; 6–1, 6–4	(Japan) Rina Saigo	(South Korea) Back Da-yeon (Japan) Misaki Matsuda	(Japan) Ayano Shimizu (Chinese Taipei) Lin Fang-an (Japan) Eri Shimizu (New Zealand) Vivian Yang
June 16	Taipei, Taiwan; Hard; W35; Singles and doubles draws	(South Korea) Ku Yeon-woo (Japan) Eri Shimizu; 6–4, 2–6, [10–5]	(South Korea) Park So-hyun (Japan) Ayano Shimizu	(South Korea) Back Da-yeon (Japan) Misaki Matsuda	(Japan) Ayano Shimizu (Chinese Taipei) Lin Fang-an (Japan) Eri Shimizu (New Zealand) Vivian Yang
June 16	Tauste, Spain; Hard; W35+H; Singles and doubles draws	(Kazakhstan) Zarina Diyas; 6–1, 6–7^{(4–7)}, 6–1	(Italy) Diletta Cherubini	(Australia) Melisa Ercan (Japan) Hiromi Abe	(Spain) Celia Anson Sanchez (India) Ankita Raina (Belgium) Clara Vlasselaer; Polina Iatcenko
June 16	Tauste, Spain; Hard; W35+H; Singles and doubles draws	(Japan) Hiromi Abe (Japan) Kanako Morisaki; 6–3, 6–2	(India) Rutuja Bhosale (India) Ankita Raina	(Australia) Melisa Ercan (Japan) Hiromi Abe	(Spain) Celia Anson Sanchez (India) Ankita Raina (Belgium) Clara Vlasselaer; Polina Iatcenko
June 16	Klosters, Switzerland; Clay; W35; Singles and doubles draws	(Germany) Katharina Hobgarski; 6–2, 7–6^{(7–2)}	Anastasia Gasanova	(France) Tiphanie Lemaître (United States) Ashley Lahey	(Turkey) Çağla Büyükakçay (Japan) Yuki Naito (Italy) Lisa Pigato (Switzerland) Jenny Dürst
June 16	Klosters, Switzerland; Clay; W35; Singles and doubles draws	(Italy) Deborah Chiesa (Italy) Lisa Pigato; 6–0, 3–6, [10–6]	(Netherlands) Jasmijn Gimbrère (United States) Ashley Lahey	(France) Tiphanie Lemaître (United States) Ashley Lahey	(Turkey) Çağla Büyükakçay (Japan) Yuki Naito (Italy) Lisa Pigato (Switzerland) Jenny Dürst
June 16	Ystad, Sweden; Clay; W35; Singles and doubles draws	(Spain) Irene Burillo Escorihuela; 6–3, 6–3	Alisa Oktiabreva	(Sweden) Caijsa Hennemann (Sweden) Nellie Taraba Wallberg	(Denmark) Johanne Svendsen (Sweden) Lea Nilsson (United States) Vivian Wolff (Germany) Tessa Johanna Brockmann
June 16	Ystad, Sweden; Clay; W35; Singles and doubles draws	(Serbia) Katarina Jokić (Brazil) Rebeca Pereira; 1–6, 6–2, [10–7]	(Sweden) June Björk (Denmark) Emma Kamper	(Sweden) Caijsa Hennemann (Sweden) Nellie Taraba Wallberg	(Denmark) Johanne Svendsen (Sweden) Lea Nilsson (United States) Vivian Wolff (Germany) Tessa Johanna Brockmann
June 16	Wichita, United States; Hard; W35; Singles and doubles draws	(United States) Fiona Crawley; 6–0, 7–5	(Japan) Mayu Crossley	(Japan) Hiroko Kuwata (India) Sahaja Yamalapalli	Maria Kononova (Chinese Taipei) Liang En-shuo (Mexico) Julia García Ruiz (China) Ma Yexin
June 16	Wichita, United States; Hard; W35; Singles and doubles draws	(Spain) Maria Berlanga Bandera (Mexico) Julia García Ruiz; 7–5, 7–5	(United States) Catherine Harrison (United States) Christina Rosca	(Japan) Hiroko Kuwata (India) Sahaja Yamalapalli	Maria Kononova (Chinese Taipei) Liang En-shuo (Mexico) Julia García Ruiz (China) Ma Yexin
June 16	Sapporo, Japan; Hard; W15; Singles and doubles draws	(Japan) Natsuki Yoshimoto; 4–6, 6–2, 6–4	(South Korea) Kim Yu-jin	(Japan) Kanon Yamaguchi (China) Zhang Ying	(Japan) Hayu Kinoshita (Japan) Honoka Kobayashi (Japan) Ayumi Miyamoto (Japan) Sae Noguchi
June 16	Sapporo, Japan; Hard; W15; Singles and doubles draws	(Japan) Moeka Miyata (Japan) Miyu Nakashima; 6–3, 6–4	(South Korea) Im Heerae (South Korea) Jang Gaeul	(Japan) Kanon Yamaguchi (China) Zhang Ying	(Japan) Hayu Kinoshita (Japan) Honoka Kobayashi (Japan) Ayumi Miyamoto (Japan) Sae Noguchi
June 16	Bolszewo, Poland; Clay; W15; Singles and doubles draws	(Belgium) Amelie Van Impe; 7–6^{(7–3)}, 0–6, 6–2	(Kenya) Angella Okutoyi	Alexandra Vasilyeva (Slovakia) Salma Drugdová	(Lithuania) Emilija Tverijonaitė (Poland) Nadia Kulbiej; Polina Bakhmutkina (Lithuania) Klaudija Bubelytė
June 16	Bolszewo, Poland; Clay; W15; Singles and doubles draws	(Netherlands) Rikke de Koning (Belgium) Amélie Van Impe; 7–6^{(9–7)}, 3–6, [10–7]	(Slovakia) Salma Drugdová (Kenya) Angella Okutoyi	Alexandra Vasilyeva (Slovakia) Salma Drugdová	(Lithuania) Emilija Tverijonaitė (Poland) Nadia Kulbiej; Polina Bakhmutkina (Lithuania) Klaudija Bubelytė
June 16	Bucharest, Romania; Clay; W15; Singles and doubles draws	(Romania) Ilinca Amariei; 3–6, 6–4, 6–4	(Romania) Lavinia Tănăsie	(Romania) Arina Vasilescu (Romania) Eva Maria Ionescu	(Slovakia) Nina Vargová (Romania) Andreea Prisăcariu (Romania) Oana Georgeta Simion (Czech Republic) Linda Ševčíková
June 16	Bucharest, Romania; Clay; W15; Singles and doubles draws	(Romania) Alexandra Irina Anghel (Romania) Carmen Andreea Herea; Walkover	(Romania) Simona Ogescu (Romania) Ioana Teodora Sava	(Romania) Arina Vasilescu (Romania) Eva Maria Ionescu	(Slovakia) Nina Vargová (Romania) Andreea Prisăcariu (Romania) Oana Georgeta Simion (Czech Republic) Linda Ševčíková
June 16	Kuršumlijska Banja, Serbia; Clay; W15; Singles and doubles draws	(Romania) Ștefania Bojică; 7–5, 7–6^{(7–3)}	(Bulgaria) Iva Ivanova	(Bulgaria) Lidia Encheva (Italy) Federica Sacco	Ekaterina Maklakova (Bulgaria) Julia Stamatova (Romania) Patricia Georgiana Goina (Austria) Claudia Gasparovic
June 16	Kuršumlijska Banja, Serbia; Clay; W15; Singles and doubles draws	Ekaterina Maklakova; Mariia Masiianskaia; 6–2, 7–5	(Romania) Ștefania Bojică; Mariam Karazhaeva	(Bulgaria) Lidia Encheva (Italy) Federica Sacco	Ekaterina Maklakova (Bulgaria) Julia Stamatova (Romania) Patricia Georgiana Goina (Austria) Claudia Gasparovic
June 16	Kayseri, Turkiye; Hard; W15; Singles and doubles draws	Edda Mamedova; 6–0, 6–1	(Australia) Alana Subasic	(Latvia) Adelina Lachinova (Romania) Maria Toma	(Slovakia) Katarína Kužmová (United States) Jamilah Snells (Ukraine) Kateryna Lazarenko (Turkey) Doğa Türkmen
June 16	Kayseri, Turkiye; Hard; W15; Singles and doubles draws	(France) Audrey Moutama (Italy) Lucrezia Musetti; 6–3, 1–6, [10–7]	(Slovakia) Katarína Kužmová; Ksenia Laskutova	(Latvia) Adelina Lachinova (Romania) Maria Toma	(Slovakia) Katarína Kužmová (United States) Jamilah Snells (Ukraine) Kateryna Lazarenko (Turkey) Doğa Türkmen
June 16	Monastir, Tunisia; Hard; W15; Singles and doubles draws	(Australia) Tahlia Kokkinis; 7–5, 6–3	(United States) Sofia Rojas	(Benin) Gloriana Nahum (India) Zeel Desai	(Hong Kong) Adithya Karunaratne (France) Laïa Petretic (Slovakia) Irina Balus (New Zealand) Elyse Tse
June 16	Monastir, Tunisia; Hard; W15; Singles and doubles draws	(Spain) Claudia Ferrer Pérez (Hong Kong) Adithya Karunaratne; 7–6^{(7–5)}, 6–1	(United States) Julia Adams (Lithuania) Andrė Lukošiūtė	(Benin) Gloriana Nahum (India) Zeel Desai	(Hong Kong) Adithya Karunaratne (France) Laïa Petretic (Slovakia) Irina Balus (New Zealand) Elyse Tse
June 16	Rancho Santa Fe, United States; Hard; W15; Singles and doubles draws	(United States) Eryn Cayetano; 6–7^{(6–8)}, 6–2, 6–0	(United States) Alexis Nguyen	(United States) Alyssa Ahn (United States) Avery Nguyen	(United States) Klara Kosan (United States) Thea Frodin (United States) Jo-yee Chan (Ukraine) Anita Sahdiieva
June 16	Rancho Santa Fe, United States; Hard; W15; Singles and doubles draws	(United States) Eryn Cayetano (Australia) Lily Fairclough; 6–3, 7–5	(Canada) Scarlett Nicholson (Ukraine) Anita Sahdiieva	(United States) Alyssa Ahn (United States) Avery Nguyen	(United States) Klara Kosan (United States) Thea Frodin (United States) Jo-yee Chan (Ukraine) Anita Sahdiieva
June 23	Palma del Río, Spain; Hard; W50+H; Singles and doubles draws	(United States) Clervie Ngounoue; 6–1, 6–4	(Netherlands) Eva Vedder	(Czech Republic) Tereza Martincová (Portugal) Francisca Jorge	(Finland) Anastasia Kulikova (France) Yasmine Mansouri (Mexico) Victoria Rodríguez (Germany) Anna-Lena Friedsam
June 23	Palma del Río, Spain; Hard; W50+H; Singles and doubles draws	(China) Feng Shuo (Chinese Taipei) Liang En-shuo; 6–2, 6–3	(Colombia) María Paulina Pérez García (Mexico) Victoria Rodríguez	(Czech Republic) Tereza Martincová (Portugal) Francisca Jorge	(Finland) Anastasia Kulikova (France) Yasmine Mansouri (Mexico) Victoria Rodríguez (Germany) Anna-Lena Friedsam
June 23	Périgueux, France; Clay; W35; Singles and doubles draws	(United States) Vivian Wolff; 4–6, 6–1, 6–4	(Spain) Cristina Díaz Adrover	(Poland) Weronika Ewald (France) Mathilde Lollia	(Brazil) Carolina Alves (Morocco) Yasmine Kabbaj; Ekaterina Kazionova (Georgia (country)) Ekaterine Gorgodze
June 23	Périgueux, France; Clay; W35; Singles and doubles draws	(Spain) Lucía Cortez Llorca (Spain) Alicia Herrero Liñana; 6–1, 6–4	(Canada) Françoise Abanda (France) Marie Mattel	(Poland) Weronika Ewald (France) Mathilde Lollia	(Brazil) Carolina Alves (Morocco) Yasmine Kabbaj; Ekaterina Kazionova (Georgia (country)) Ekaterine Gorgodze
June 23	Tarvisio, Italy; Clay; W35; Singles and doubles draws	(Italy) Vittoria Paganetti; 6–0, 6–4	(Slovenia) Nika Radišić	(Italy) Deborah Chiesa (Italy) Silvia Ambrosio	(Italy) Lisa Pigato (Czech Republic) Aneta Kučmová (Brazil) Gabriela Cé (Slovenia) Dalila Jakupović
June 23	Tarvisio, Italy; Clay; W35; Singles and doubles draws	(Czech Republic) Aneta Kučmová (Poland) Daria Kuczer; 2–6, 6–1, [13–11]	(Slovenia) Dalila Jakupović (Slovenia) Nika Radišić	(Italy) Deborah Chiesa (Italy) Silvia Ambrosio	(Italy) Lisa Pigato (Czech Republic) Aneta Kučmová (Brazil) Gabriela Cé (Slovenia) Dalila Jakupović
June 23	Taipei, Taiwan; Hard; W35; Singles and doubles draws	(Indonesia) Janice Tjen; 4–6, 6–1, 6–2	(Japan) Momoko Kobori	(South Korea) Park So-hyun (Japan) Eri Shimizu	(Japan) Natsumi Kawaguchi (Japan) Rina Saigo (Japan) Sakura Hosogi (Japan) Ayano Shimizu
June 23	Taipei, Taiwan; Hard; W35; Singles and doubles draws	(South Korea) Park So-hyun (Indonesia) Janice Tjen; 6–1, 7–5	(Chinese Taipei) Li Yu-yun (Japan) Eri Shimizu	(South Korea) Park So-hyun (Japan) Eri Shimizu	(Japan) Natsumi Kawaguchi (Japan) Rina Saigo (Japan) Sakura Hosogi (Japan) Ayano Shimizu
June 23	Hong Kong, Hong Kong; Hard; W15; Singles and doubles draws	(China) Lu Jiajing; 6–1, 6–1	(Thailand) Anchisa Chanta	(Japan) Rinko Matsuda; Vlada Mincheva	(Hong Kong) Shek Cheuk Ying (Canada) Annabelle Xu (South Korea) Jeong Bo-young (China) Tian Fangran
June 23	Hong Kong, Hong Kong; Hard; W15; Singles and doubles draws	Evgeniya Burdina; Anastasia Grechkina; 6–2, 6–2	(South Korea) Jeong Bo-young (China) Tian Fangran	(Japan) Rinko Matsuda; Vlada Mincheva	(Hong Kong) Shek Cheuk Ying (Canada) Annabelle Xu (South Korea) Jeong Bo-young (China) Tian Fangran
June 23	Ma'anshan, China; Hard (i); W15; Singles and doubles draws	(China) Zhu Chenting; 6–2, 6–4	(China) Guo Meiqi	(China) Yang Yidi (China) Wang Jiaqi	(China) Hou Yanan (China) Huang Yujia (Thailand) Punnin Kovapitukted (China) Ni Ma Zhuoma
June 23	Ma'anshan, China; Hard (i); W15; Singles and doubles draws	(China) Huang Yujia (New Zealand) Vivian Yang; 7–5, 1–6, [10–3]	(China) Ni Ma Zhuoma (China) Wang Jiaqi	(China) Yang Yidi (China) Wang Jiaqi	(China) Hou Yanan (China) Huang Yujia (Thailand) Punnin Kovapitukted (China) Ni Ma Zhuoma
June 23	Sapporo, Japan; Hard; W15; Singles and doubles draws	(Japan) Natsuki Yoshimoto; 6–1, 6–0	(Japan) Ayumi Miyamoto	(Japan) Honoka Kobayashi (Japan) Sera Nishimoto	(Japan) Hayu Kinoshita (Australia) Stefani Webb (South Korea) Choi On-yu (South Korea) Moon Jeong
June 23	Sapporo, Japan; Hard; W15; Singles and doubles draws	(Japan) Kanna Soeda (Japan) Maiko Uchijima; 6–7^{(2–7)}, 6–1, [10–8]	(South Korea) Choi On-yu (China) Zhang Ying	(Japan) Honoka Kobayashi (Japan) Sera Nishimoto	(Japan) Hayu Kinoshita (Australia) Stefani Webb (South Korea) Choi On-yu (South Korea) Moon Jeong
June 23	Alkmaar, Netherlands; Clay; W15; Singles and doubles draws	(Netherlands) Rose Marie Nijkamp; 1–6, 6–3, 6–4	(Netherlands) Isis Louise van den Broek	(Netherlands) Joy de Zeeuw (Germany) Fabienne Gettwart	(Germany) Eva Voracek (Germany) Emily Seibold (Kenya) Angella Okutoyi (Netherlands) Britt du Pree
June 23	Alkmaar, Netherlands; Clay; W15; Singles and doubles draws	(Netherlands) Loes Ebeling Koning (Netherlands) Sarah van Emst; 7–6^{(7–4)}, 6–3	(Netherlands) Rose Marie Nijkamp (Netherlands) Isis Louise van den Broek	(Netherlands) Joy de Zeeuw (Germany) Fabienne Gettwart	(Germany) Eva Voracek (Germany) Emily Seibold (Kenya) Angella Okutoyi (Netherlands) Britt du Pree
June 23	Kamen, Germany; Clay; W15; Singles and doubles draws	(Germany) Mariella Thamm; 6–4, 7–5	(Germany) Ida Wobker	(Germany) Tessa Johanna Brockmann (Italy) Carolina Troiano	(Argentina) María Florencia Urrutia (Ukraine) Anastasiia Firman (United States) Mia Slama (Slovenia) Živa Falkner
June 23	Kamen, Germany; Clay; W15; Singles and doubles draws	(Germany) Laura Böhner (Germany) Mariella Thamm; 6–2, 6–4	(Germany) Josy Daems (Ukraine) Anastasiia Firman	(Germany) Tessa Johanna Brockmann (Italy) Carolina Troiano	(Argentina) María Florencia Urrutia (Ukraine) Anastasiia Firman (United States) Mia Slama (Slovenia) Živa Falkner
June 23	Galați, Romania; Clay; W15; Singles and doubles draws	(Bulgaria) Lidia Encheva; 7–5, 7–5	(Spain) Ruth Roura Llaverias	(Romania) Bianca Bărbulescu (Romania) Andreea Prisăcariu	(Romania) Diana-Ioana Simionescu (Italy) Isabella Maria Șerban (Romania) Eva Maria Ionescu (Romania) Elena Ruxandra Bertea
June 23	Galați, Romania; Clay; W15; Singles and doubles draws	(Romania) Cara Maria Meșter (Romania) Vanessa Popa Teiuşanu; 7–6^{(7–0)}, 2–6, [10–6]	(Romania) Ilinca Sagmar (Romania) Cristiana Nicoleta Todoni	(Romania) Bianca Bărbulescu (Romania) Andreea Prisăcariu	(Romania) Diana-Ioana Simionescu (Italy) Isabella Maria Șerban (Romania) Eva Maria Ionescu (Romania) Elena Ruxandra Bertea
June 23	Kuršumlijska Banja, Serbia; Clay; W15; Singles and doubles draws	(Kazakhstan) Zhibek Kulambayeva; 6–4, 7–6^{(7–5)}	(Serbia) Draginja Vuković	Milana Zhabrailova (Chile) Antonia Vergara Rivera	(Bosnia and Herzegovina) Suana Tucaković (Slovakia) Stella Kovačičová; Karine Sarkisova (Bulgaria) Denislava Glushkova
June 23	Kuršumlijska Banja, Serbia; Clay; W15; Singles and doubles draws	(Czech Republic) Michaela Bayerlová (Czech Republic) Denisa Hindová; 2–6, 7–6^{(7–3)}, [10–7]	(Serbia) Draginja Vuković; Milana Zhabrailova	Milana Zhabrailova (Chile) Antonia Vergara Rivera	(Bosnia and Herzegovina) Suana Tucaković (Slovakia) Stella Kovačičová; Karine Sarkisova (Bulgaria) Denislava Glushkova
June 23	Kayseri, Turkiye; Hard; W15; Singles and doubles draws	(Latvia) Adelina Lachinova; 6–3, 2–6, 6–4	(France) Marie Villet	(Slovakia) Katarína Kužmová (Australia) Alana Subasic	(Colombia) María Herazo González (Uzbekistan) Milana Maslenkova (United Kingdom) Esther Adeshina (Turkey) Ilay Yörük
June 23	Kayseri, Turkiye; Hard; W15; Singles and doubles draws	(Colombia) María Herazo González (Latvia) Adelina Lachinova; 4–6, 7–5, [10–5]	(China) Min Liu; Edda Mamedova	(Slovakia) Katarína Kužmová (Australia) Alana Subasic	(Colombia) María Herazo González (Uzbekistan) Milana Maslenkova (United Kingdom) Esther Adeshina (Turkey) Ilay Yörük
June 23	Monastir, Tunisia; Hard; W15; Singles and doubles draws	(Egypt) Lamis Alhussein Abdel Aziz; 6–1, 6–7^{(5–7)}, 2–0 ret.	(Austria) Arabella Koller	(Lithuania) Andrė Lukošiūtė (New Zealand) Elyse Tse	(Spain) Judith Perelló Saavedra (France) Alyssa Réguer (United States) Kate Mansfield (Australia) Tahlia Kokkinis
June 23	Monastir, Tunisia; Hard; W15; Singles and doubles draws	(United States) Julia Adams (Tunisia) Mouna Bouzgarrou; 6–2, 6–2	(Argentina) Gala Arangio (New Zealand) Elyse Tse	(Lithuania) Andrė Lukošiūtė (New Zealand) Elyse Tse	(Spain) Judith Perelló Saavedra (France) Alyssa Réguer (United States) Kate Mansfield (Australia) Tahlia Kokkinis
June 23	Lakewood, United States; Hard; W15; Singles and doubles draws	(United States) Eryn Cayetano; 6–3, 7–5	(United States) Anne Christine Lutkemeyer Obregon	(United States) Alyssa Ahn (United States) Alexis Nguyen	(United States) Haley Giavara (Japan) Natsuho Arakawa (Japan) Hiroko Kuwata (United States) Tianmei Wang
June 23	Lakewood, United States; Hard; W15; Singles and doubles draws	(United States) Eryn Cayetano (United States) Haley Giavara; 6–0, 6–1	(United States) Jordyn McBride (United States) Kristina Nordikyan	(United States) Alyssa Ahn (United States) Alexis Nguyen	(United States) Haley Giavara (Japan) Natsuho Arakawa (Japan) Hiroko Kuwata (United States) Tianmei Wang
June 30	Cary Tennis Classic; Cary, United States; Hard; W100; Singles and doubles draws	(Czech Republic) Darja Viďmanová; 6–3, 6–1	(United States) Monika Ekstrand	(China) Ma Yexin (Canada) Cadence Brace	(Japan) Wakana Sonobe (United States) Elvina Kalieva (Italy) Lucrezia Stefanini (United States) Elizabeth Mandlik
June 30	Cary Tennis Classic; Cary, United States; Hard; W100; Singles and doubles draws	(United States) Ayana Akli (United States) Abigail Rencheli; 6–3, 6–2	(South Africa) Gabriella Broadfoot (United States) Maddy Zampardo	(China) Ma Yexin (Canada) Cadence Brace	(Japan) Wakana Sonobe (United States) Elvina Kalieva (Italy) Lucrezia Stefanini (United States) Elizabeth Mandlik
June 30	Bucharest, Romania; Clay; W75; Singles and doubles draws	(Slovenia) Tamara Zidanšek; 6–1, 7–5	(Italy) Nuria Brancaccio	(France) Léolia Jeanjean (Spain) Andrea Lázaro García	(France) Alice Ramé (Spain) Guiomar Maristany (France) Tessah Andrianjafitrimo (Argentina) María Lourdes Carlé
June 30	Bucharest, Romania; Clay; W75; Singles and doubles draws	(France) Estelle Cascino (Romania) Patricia Maria Țig; 4–6, 6–3, [10–6]	(India) Riya Bhatia (Burundi) Sada Nahimana	(France) Léolia Jeanjean (Spain) Andrea Lázaro García	(France) Alice Ramé (Spain) Guiomar Maristany (France) Tessah Andrianjafitrimo (Argentina) María Lourdes Carlé
June 30	Amstelveen Women's Open; Amstelveen, Netherlands; Clay; W35; Singles and doubles draws	(Germany) Katharina Hobgarski; 0–1 ret.	(United States) Louisa Chirico	(Germany) Nastasja Schunk (Netherlands) Sarah van Emst	(Sweden) Caijsa Hennemann (Japan) Yuki Naito (Switzerland) Jenny Dürst (Netherlands) Lian Tran
June 30	Amstelveen Women's Open; Amstelveen, Netherlands; Clay; W35; Singles and doubles draws	(Netherlands) Joy de Zeeuw (Netherlands) Sarah van Emst; 1–6, 6–2, [10–8]	(Netherlands) Jasmijn Gimbrère (Netherlands) Stéphanie Visscher	(Germany) Nastasja Schunk (Netherlands) Sarah van Emst	(Sweden) Caijsa Hennemann (Japan) Yuki Naito (Switzerland) Jenny Dürst (Netherlands) Lian Tran
June 30	Stuttgart-Vaihingen, Germany; Clay; W35; Singles and doubles draws	(Czech Republic) Nikola Bartůňková; 6–4, 7–6^{(7–2)}	(Germany) Emily Seibold	(Switzerland) Ylena In-Albon (Croatia) Lea Bošković	(Germany) Ida Wobker (Germany) Valentina Steiner (Germany) Noma Noha Akugue (Croatia) Tena Lukas
June 30	Stuttgart-Vaihingen, Germany; Clay; W35; Singles and doubles draws	(Greece) Martha Matoula (Slovakia) Radka Zelníčková; 7–6^{(7–5)}, 7–5	(Switzerland) Chelsea Fontenel; Alevtina Ibragimova	(Switzerland) Ylena In-Albon (Croatia) Lea Bošković	(Germany) Ida Wobker (Germany) Valentina Steiner (Germany) Noma Noha Akugue (Croatia) Tena Lukas
June 30	BMW Roma Cup; Rome, Italy; Clay; W35; Singles and doubles draws	(Italy) Dalila Spiteri; 6–3, 7–5	(Italy) Giorgia Pedone	Alisa Oktiabreva (Brazil) Gabriela Cé	(Poland) Monika Stankiewicz (Georgia (country)) Ekaterine Gorgodze (Argentina) Jazmín Ortenzi (Italy) Jennifer Ruggeri
June 30	BMW Roma Cup; Rome, Italy; Clay; W35; Singles and doubles draws	(Italy) Noemi Basiletti (Italy) Giorgia Pedone; 6–3, 6–1	(Italy) Francesca Pace (Italy) Sofia Rocchetti	Alisa Oktiabreva (Brazil) Gabriela Cé	(Poland) Monika Stankiewicz (Georgia (country)) Ekaterine Gorgodze (Argentina) Jazmín Ortenzi (Italy) Jennifer Ruggeri
June 30	Hong Kong, Hong Kong; Hard; W15; Singles and doubles draws	(Japan) Ikumi Yamazaki; 6–4, 2–6, 6–1	(China) Tian Fangran	(Japan) Miho Kuramochi (China) Zhang Ying	(South Korea) Jeong Bo-young (Thailand) Bunyawi Thamchaiwat; Anastasia Grechkina (Japan) Mayuka Aikawa
June 30	Hong Kong, Hong Kong; Hard; W15; Singles and doubles draws	(Hong Kong) Shek Cheuk Ying (China) Zhang Ying; 6–1, 6–1	(South Korea) Jeong Bo-young (China) Tian Fangran	(Japan) Miho Kuramochi (China) Zhang Ying	(South Korea) Jeong Bo-young (Thailand) Bunyawi Thamchaiwat; Anastasia Grechkina (Japan) Mayuka Aikawa
June 30	Ma'anshan, China; Hard (i); W15; Singles and doubles draws	Sofya Lansere; 6–1, 6–0	(Sweden) Tiana Tian Deng	(Thailand) Peangtarn Plipuech (China) Li Zongyu	(China) Yao Xinxin (Slovakia) Viktória Morvayová (New Zealand) Vivian Yang; Polina Kuharenko
June 30	Ma'anshan, China; Hard (i); W15; Singles and doubles draws	(Thailand) Peangtarn Plipuech (China) Wang Jiaqi; 6–7^{(6–8)}, 6–4, [10–4]	(Kazakhstan) Sandugash Kenzhibayeva; Sofya Lansere	(Thailand) Peangtarn Plipuech (China) Li Zongyu	(China) Yao Xinxin (Slovakia) Viktória Morvayová (New Zealand) Vivian Yang; Polina Kuharenko
June 30	Getxo, Spain; Clay (i); W15; Singles and doubles draws	(Germany) Joëlle Steur; 4–6, 6–3, 6–2	(Spain) Ruth Roura Llaverias	(Germany) Gina Marie Dittmann (Bolivia) Noelia Zeballos	(Spain) Noelia Bouzó Zanotti (France) Eleejah Inisan (Spain) Didi Bredberg Canizares (Belgium) Lisa Claeys
June 30	Getxo, Spain; Clay (i); W15; Singles and doubles draws	(Germany) Joëlle Steur (Bolivia) Noelia Zeballos; 6–4, 6–2	(Spain) Cayetana Gay (Spain) Isabel Pascual Montalvo	(Germany) Gina Marie Dittmann (Bolivia) Noelia Zeballos	(Spain) Noelia Bouzó Zanotti (France) Eleejah Inisan (Spain) Didi Bredberg Canizares (Belgium) Lisa Claeys
June 30	Bissy-Chambéry, France; Hard; W15; Singles and doubles draws	(France) Ophélie Boullay; 7–6^{(7–2)}, 6–0	(France) Chloé Noël	(France) Louna Zoppas (Spain) Carmen López Martínez	(France) Margot Phanthala (Italy) Carlotta Moccia (France) Massiva Boukirat (Italy) Isabella Maria Șerban
June 30	Bissy-Chambéry, France; Hard; W15; Singles and doubles draws	Ekaterina Ovcharenko; Ekaterina Yashina; 6–2, 6–0	(France) Élise Renard (France) Louna Zoppas	(France) Louna Zoppas (Spain) Carmen López Martínez	(France) Margot Phanthala (Italy) Carlotta Moccia (France) Massiva Boukirat (Italy) Isabella Maria Șerban
June 30	Mogyoród, Hungary; Clay; W15; Singles and doubles draws	(Czech Republic) Lucie Havlíčková; 6–2, 7–5	(Switzerland) Katerina Tsygourova	(Argentina) Agustina Chlpac (Poland) Anna Hertel	(Ukraine) Daryna Shoshyna (Slovakia) Salma Drugdová (Czech Republic) Karolína Vlčková (Germany) Franziska Sziedat
June 30	Mogyoród, Hungary; Clay; W15; Singles and doubles draws	(Slovakia) Natália Kročková (Czech Republic) Karolína Vlčková; 7–5, 6–3	(Slovakia) Nikola Daubnerová (Czech Republic) Linda Ševčíková	(Argentina) Agustina Chlpac (Poland) Anna Hertel	(Ukraine) Daryna Shoshyna (Slovakia) Salma Drugdová (Czech Republic) Karolína Vlčková (Germany) Franziska Sziedat
June 30	Kuršumlijska Banja, Serbia; Clay; W15; Singles and doubles draws	(Serbia) Petra Konjikušić; 7–5, 6–0	(Serbia) Draginja Vuković	Karine Sarkisova; Milana Zhabrailova	(Serbia) Andjela Lazarević (Chile) Antonia Vergara Rivera (Italy) Gloria Ceschi (Sweden) Isabella Svahn
June 30	Kuršumlijska Banja, Serbia; Clay; W15; Singles and doubles draws	(Estonia) Grete Gull (Estonia) Laura Rahnel; 6–1, 7–5	(Argentina) Pilar Beveraggi Lespiau (Italy) Gloria Ceschi	Karine Sarkisova; Milana Zhabrailova	(Serbia) Andjela Lazarević (Chile) Antonia Vergara Rivera (Italy) Gloria Ceschi (Sweden) Isabella Svahn
June 30	Kayseri, Turkiye; Hard; W15; Singles and doubles draws	(Slovakia) Katarína Kužmová; 6–4, 6–1	(United Kingdom) Esther Adeshina	(Egypt) Jana Hossam Salah (Latvia) Adelina Lachinova	(Colombia) María Herazo González (Turkey) Ayşegül Mert (France) Nahjime Dho (Australia) Alana Subasic
June 30	Kayseri, Turkiye; Hard; W15; Singles and doubles draws	(United Kingdom) Esther Adeshina (Colombia) María Herazo González; 6–0, 7–6^{(7–3)}	(Germany) Anastasiya Kuparev (Switzerland) Ayline Samardžić	(Egypt) Jana Hossam Salah (Latvia) Adelina Lachinova	(Colombia) María Herazo González (Turkey) Ayşegül Mert (France) Nahjime Dho (Australia) Alana Subasic
June 30	Monastir, Tunisia; Hard; W15; Singles and doubles draws	(France) Manon Léonard; 6–1, 6–2	(Japan) Rina Saigo	(Egypt) Sandra Samir (Egypt) Lamis Alhussein Abdel Aziz	(United States) Julia Adams (Canada) Anna Tabunshchyk (Germany) Anja Wildgruber (Austria) Arabella Koller
June 30	Monastir, Tunisia; Hard; W15; Singles and doubles draws	(Egypt) Lamis Alhussein Abdel Aziz (Egypt) Merna Refaat; 6–4, 3–6, [10–7]	(Lithuania) Patricija Paukštytė (New Zealand) Elyse Tse	(Egypt) Sandra Samir (Egypt) Lamis Alhussein Abdel Aziz	(United States) Julia Adams (Canada) Anna Tabunshchyk (Germany) Anja Wildgruber (Austria) Arabella Koller
June 30	Hillcrest, South Africa; Hard; W15; Singles and doubles draws	(Zimbabwe) Valeria Bhunu; 7–6^{(7–3)}, 6–3	(France) Astrid Cirotte	(China) Xiao Lexue (South Africa) Jahnie Van Zyl	(India) Smriti Bhasin; Polina Leykina (South Africa) Heike Janse van Vuuren (South Africa) Allegra van der Walt
June 30	Hillcrest, South Africa; Hard; W15; Singles and doubles draws	(France) Astrid Cirotte; Polina Leykina; 6–4, 6–3	(Benin) Gloriana Nahum (China) Zhao Yichen	(China) Xiao Lexue (South Africa) Jahnie Van Zyl	(India) Smriti Bhasin; Polina Leykina (South Africa) Heike Janse van Vuuren (South Africa) Allegra van der Walt
June 30	Los Angeles, United States; Hard; W15; Singles and doubles draws	Veronica Miroshnichenko; 6–2, 6–3	(United States) Kylie Collins	(India) Krisha Mahendran (United States) Christasha McNeil	(United States) Eryn Cayetano (Poland) Olivia Bergler (United States) Ava Hrastar (Poland) Stefania Rogozińska Dzik
June 30	Los Angeles, United States; Hard; W15; Singles and doubles draws	(United States) Kylie Collins (Ukraine) Anita Sahdiieva; 6–3, 6–1	(United States) Olivia Center (United States) Sophia Webster	(India) Krisha Mahendran (United States) Christasha McNeil	(United States) Eryn Cayetano (Poland) Olivia Bergler (United States) Ava Hrastar (Poland) Stefania Rogozińska Dzik
