= 2022 Zagreb Ladies Open =

Tennis tournament

- Date: 25 April–1 May 2022
- Edition: 12th
- Category: ITF Women's World Tennis Tour
- Prize money: $60,000
- Surface: Clay / Outdoor
- Location: Zagreb, Croatia

Champions

Singles
- (Germany) Jule Niemeier

Doubles
- (Czech Republic) Anastasia Dețiuc / (Ukraine) Katarina Zavatska
| ← 2021 · | Zagreb Ladies Open | · 2023 → |

The 2022 Zagreb Ladies Open was a professional tennis tournament played on outdoor clay courts. It was the twelfth edition of the tournament which was part of the 2022 ITF Women's World Tennis Tour. It took place in Zagreb, Croatia between 25 April and 1 May 2022.

== Singles main draw entrants ==
=== Seeds ===
| Country | Player | Rank^{1} | Seed |
|---|---|---|---|
| CRO | Donna Vekić | 107 | 1 |
| GER | Jule Niemeier | 108 | 2 |
| HUN | Réka Luca Jani | 140 | 3 |
| ARG | Paula Ormaechea | 150 | 4 |
| SLO | Polona Hercog | 164 | 5 |
| GRE | Despina Papamichail | 173 | 6 |
| GER | Anna-Lena Friedsam | 184 | 7 |
| CZE | Linda Nosková | 188 | 8 |

- ^{1} Rankings are as of 18 April 2022.

=== Other entrants ===
The following players received wildcards into the singles main draw:

- (Croatia) Lucija Ćirić Bagarić
- (Croatia) Petra Marčinko
- (Serbia) Lola Radivojević
- (Croatia) Donna Vekić

The following players received entry from the qualifying draw:

- (Croatia) Lea Bošković
- (Slovenia) Živa Falkner
- (Croatia) Tena Lukas
- (Germany) Eva Lys
- Ekaterina Makarova
- (Slovenia) Nina Potočnik
- (Croatia) Antonia Ružić
- (Croatia) Tara Würth

== Champions ==
=== Singles ===
- (Germany) Jule Niemeier def. (Hungary) Réka Luca Jani, 6–2, 6–2

=== Doubles ===
- (Czech Republic) Anastasia Dețiuc / (Ukraine) Katarina Zavatska def. (North Macedonia) Lina Gjorcheska / Irina Khromacheva, 6–4, 6–7^{(5–7)}, [11–9].
