= 2023 Zagreb Ladies Open =

Tennis tournament

- Date: 8–14 May 2023
- Edition: 13th
- Category: ITF Women's World Tennis Tour
- Prize money: $60,000
- Surface: Clay / Outdoor
- Location: Zagreb, Croatia

Champions

Singles
- (Romania) Jaqueline Cristian

Doubles
- (Greece) Valentini Grammatikopoulou / (Slovenia) Dalila Jakupović
← 2022 ·	Zagreb Ladies Open	· 2024 →

The 2023 Zagreb Ladies Open was a professional tennis tournament played on outdoor clay courts. It was the thirteenth edition of the tournament, which was part of the 2023 ITF Women's World Tennis Tour. It took place in Zagreb, Croatia, between 8 and 14 May 2023.

== Champions ==
=== Singles ===
- (Romania) Jaqueline Cristian def. (Germany) Ella Seidel, 6–1, 3–6, 7–6^{(7–0)}

=== Doubles ===
- (Greece) Valentini Grammatikopoulou / (Slovenia) Dalila Jakupović def. (France) Carole Monnet / (Croatia) Antonia Ružić, 6–2, 7–5

== Singles main draw entrants ==
=== Seeds ===
Country	Player	Rank	Seed
FRA	Diane Parry	106	1
HUN	Réka Luca Jani	131	2
ROU	Jaqueline Cristian	168	3
GBR	Heather Watson	169	4
FRA	Séléna Janicijevic	174	5
UZB	Nigina Abduraimova	184	6
FRA	Carole Monnet	199	7
CYP	Raluca Șerban	203	8

- Rankings are as of 1 May 2023.

=== Other entrants ===
The following players received wildcards into the singles main draw:

- (Croatia) Lucija Ćirić Bagarić
- (Croatia) Jana Fett
- (Croatia) Dora Mišković
- (Croatia) Iva Primorac

The following players received entry from the qualifying draw:

- (Slovenia) Veronika Erjavec
- (Czech Republic) Denise Hrdinková
- (Serbia) Lola Radivojević
- (Italy) Sofia Rocchetti
- (Australia) Arina Rodionova
- (Germany) Ella Seidel
- (Turkey) Zeynep Sönmez
- (Slovakia) Laura Svatíková
