= 2025 Zagreb Ladies Open – Doubles =

Doubles
- 2025 Zagreb Ladies Open

Final
- Champions: (China) Feng Shuo (Japan) Aoi Ito
- Runners-up: Arina Bulatova (Greece) Martha Matoula
- Score: 7–5, 6–3

Events
Singles	Doubles
← 2024 ·	Zagreb Ladies Open	· 2026 →

Céline Naef and Laura Pigossi were the defending champions, but chose not to participate this year.

Feng Shuo and Aoi Ito won the title, defeating Arina Bulatova and Martha Matoula in the final, 7–5, 6–3.

== Seeds ==
1. (Ukraine) Valeriya Strakhova / (Croatia) Tara Würth (quarterfinals, withdrew)
2. (United States) Carmen Corley / (United States) Ivana Corley (first round)
3. (Switzerland) Naima Karamoko / (France) Elixane Lechemia (quarterfinals)
4. (Germany) Noma Noha Akugue / (Bosnia and Herzegovina) Anita Wagner (quarterfinals)

== Draw ==
=== Key ===
- Q = Qualifier
- WC = Wild card
- LL = Lucky loser
- Alt = Alternate
- ITF = ITF entry
- PR = Protected ranking
- SR = Special ranking
- SE = Special exempt
- JE = Junior exempt
- JR = Junior Accelerator Programme entrant
- CO = College Accelerator Programme entrant
- NG = Next Gen Accelerator Program entrant
- w/o = Walkover
- r = Retired
- d = Defaulted

First round
(Croatia) R Derniković (Croatia) M Dražić	2	4
(China) S Feng (Japan) A Ito	6	6
3	(Switzerland) N Karamoko (France) E Lechemia	6^{7}	6	[10]
(Japan) M Ayukawa (Romania) B Szabó	7^{9}	0	[3]
V Kan; E Makarova	6	7
(Mexico) F Contreras (Australia) A Osborne	2	5
(Italy) S De Stefano (Italy) B Ricci	1	2
A Bulatova (Greece) M Matoula	6	6
(Slovenia) D Jakupović (Slovenia) N Radišić	1	6^{5}
4	(Germany) N Akugue (Bosnia and Herzegovina) A Wagner	6	7^{7}
(Slovenia) Ž Falkner (Croatia) D Mišković	4	4
E Ovcharenko (United Kingdom) E Webley-Smith	6	6
(Argentina) J Riera; M Timofeeva	6	3	[12]
2	(United States) C Corley (United States) I Corley	4	6	[10]

Quarterfinals
1	(Ukraine) V Strakhova (Croatia) T Würth
(China) S Feng (Japan) A Ito	w/o
3	(Switzerland) N Karamoko (France) E Lechemia	5	6	[7]
V Kan; E Makarova	7	2	[10]
A Bulatova (Greece) M Matoula	6^{8}	6	[10]
4	(Germany) N Akugue (Bosnia and Herzegovina) A Wagner	7^{10}	4	[8]
E Ovcharenko (United Kingdom) E Webley-Smith	3	6	[9]
(Argentina) J Riera; M Timofeeva	6	4	[11]

Semifinals
(China) S Feng (Japan) A Ito	6	7
V Kan; E Makarova	4	5
A Bulatova (Greece) M Matoula	6	6
(Argentina) J Riera; M Timofeeva	2	3

Final
(China) S Feng (Japan) A Ito	7	6
A Bulatova (Greece) M Matoula	5	3
