= 2025 Zagreb Ladies Open – Singles =

Singles
- 2025 Zagreb Ladies Open

Final
- Champion: (Czech Republic) Dominika Šalková
- Runner-up: (Croatia) Tara Würth
- Score: 2–6, 6–3, 6–3

Events
Singles	Doubles
← 2024 ·	Zagreb Ladies Open	· 2026 →

Dominika Šalková won the title, defeating defending champion Tara Würth in the final, 2–6, 6–3, 6–3.

== Seeds ==
1. (Netherlands) Arantxa Rus (first round)
2. (Japan) Aoi Ito (first round)
3. (Liechtenstein) Kathinka von Deichmann (first round)
4. (Argentina) Julia Riera (quarterfinals)
5. (Italy) Giorgia Pedone (second round)
6. Ekaterina Makarova (quarterfinals)
7. (Czech Republic) Dominika Šalková (champion)
8. (France) Selena Janicijevic (quarterfinals)

== Draw ==
=== Key ===
- Q = Qualifier
- WC = Wild card
- LL = Lucky loser
- Alt = Alternate
- ITF = ITF entry
- PR = Protected ranking
- SR = Special ranking
- SE = Special exempt
- JE = Junior exempt
- JR = Junior Accelerator Programme entrant
- CO = College Accelerator Programme entrant
- NG = Next Gen Accelerator Program entrant
- w/o = Walkover
- r = Retired
- d = Defaulted

=== Finals ===
Semifinals
(Croatia) Tara Würth	6	6
JE	(Italy) Tyra Caterina Grant	4	4
7	(Czech Republic) Dominika Šalková	6	6
Q	(Italy) Samira De Stefano	3	4

Final
(Croatia) Tara Würth	6	3	3
7	(Czech Republic) Dominika Šalková	2	6	6

=== Top half ===
First round
1	(Netherlands) A Rus	6	4	3
Q	(Sweden) K Rinaldo Persson	0	6	6
M Timofeeva	5	6	3
Q	(Serbia) M Ristić	7	4	6
(Croatia) T Würth	7	4	7
(China) H Guo	5	6	5
WC	(Croatia) S Svetac	1	2
5	(Italy) G Pedone	6	6
3	(Liechtenstein) K von Deichmann	4	5
(Hungary) AK Tóth	6	7
(Germany) N Noha Akugue	3	1
JE	(Italy) TC Grant	6	6
WC	(Croatia) I Primorac	5	2
WC	(Croatia) L Ćirić Bagarić	7	6
Q	(Greece) M Matoula	4	2
6	E Makarova	6	6

Second round
Q	(Sweden) K Rinaldo Persson	6	6
Q	(Serbia) M Ristić	3	4
(Croatia) T Würth	6	6
5	(Italy) G Pedone	3	3
(Hungary) AK Tóth	7^{8}	4	2
JE	(Italy) TC Grant	6^{6}	6	6
WC	(Croatia) L Ćirić Bagarić	2	3
6	E Makarova	6	6

Quarterfinals
Q	(Sweden) K Rinaldo Persson	6	4	1
(Croatia) T Würth	2	6	6
JE	(Italy) TC Grant	6	6
6	E Makarova	4	3

Semifinals
(Croatia) T Würth	6	6
JE	(Italy) TC Grant	4	4

=== Bottom half ===
First round
7	(Czech Republic) D Šalková	4	5
(Ukraine) V Strakhova	6	1^{r}
Q	(Serbia) T Kostović	6^{1}	6	6
Q	(Ukraine) K Zavatska	7^{7}	2	3
(Ukraine) A Sobolieva	6	6
(Croatia) T Lukas	2	4
WC	(Croatia) D Mišković	6	4	1
4	(Argentina) J Riera	0	6	6
8	(France) S Janicijevic	7^{7}	6
Q	(Romania) G Lee	6^{5}	1
(Cyprus) R Serban	4	6	4
Q	(North Macedonia) L Gjorcheska	6	3	6
Q	(Romania) G Crăciun	6	2	3
Q	(Italy) S De Stefano	2	6	6
(Slovenia) D Jakupović	4	6	7^{9}
2	(Japan) A Ito	6	4	6^{7}

Second round
7	(Czech Republic) D Šalková	6	7
Q	(Serbia) T Kostović	4	5
(Ukraine) A Sobolieva	4	6	4
4	(Argentina) J Riera	6	3	6
8	(France) S Janicijevic	6	6
Q	(North Macedonia) L Gjorcheska	3	3
Q	(Italy) S De Stefano	6	6
(Slovenia) D Jakupović	3	4

Quarterfinals
7	(Czech Republic) D Šalková	6	6
4	(Argentina) J Riera	4	4
8	(France) S Janicijevic	2	4
Q	(Italy) S De Stefano	6	6

Semifinals
7	(Czech Republic) D Šalková	6	6
Q	(Italy) S De Stefano	3	4
