= 2024 Zagreb Ladies Open – Doubles =

Doubles
- 2024 Zagreb Ladies Open

Final
- Champions: (Switzerland) Céline Naef (Brazil) Laura Pigossi
- Runners-up: (United Kingdom) Emily Appleton (India) Prarthana Thombare
- Score: 4–6, 6–1, [10–8]

Events
Singles	Doubles
← 2023 ·	Zagreb Ladies Open	· 2025 →

Valentini Grammatikopoulou and Dalila Jakupović are the defending champions, but chose not to participate this year.

Céline Naef and Laura Pigossi won the title, defeating Emily Appleton and Prarthana Thombare in the final, 4–6, 6–1, [10–8].

== Seeds ==
1. (United Kingdom) Emily Appleton / (India) Prarthana Thombare (final)
2. (Kazakhstan) Zhibek Kulambayeva / (Greece) Sapfo Sakellaridi (semifinals)
3. (Switzerland) Céline Naef / (Brazil) Laura Pigossi (champions)
4. (Croatia) Mariana Dražić / (Georgia (country)) Ekaterine Gorgodze (semifinals)

== Draw ==
=== Key ===
- Q = Qualifier
- WC = Wild card
- LL = Lucky loser
- Alt = Alternate
- SE = Special exempt
- PR = Protected ranking
- ITF = ITF entry
- JE = Junior exempt
- w/o = Walkover
- r = Retired
- d = Defaulted
- SR = Special ranking

First round
(Croatia) I Primorac (Croatia) T Würth	7	6
(Croatia) D Mišković (Australia) A Subasic	5	3

Quarterfinals
1	(United Kingdom) E Appleton (India) P Thombare	6	6
(Turkey) A Aksu (Croatia) E Kajević	4	1
4	(Croatia) M Dražić (Georgia (country)) E Gorgodze	7	6
(Croatia) R Derniković (Croatia) L Ivković	5	3
(Croatia) I Primorac (Croatia) T Würth	4	7	[3]
3	(Switzerland) C Naef (Brazil) L Pigossi	6	5	[10]
J Kolodynska (Bosnia and Herzegovina) A Wagner	6	1	[8]
2	(Kazakhstan) Z Kulambayeva (Greece) S Sakellaridi	3	6	[10]

Semifinals
1	(United Kingdom) E Appleton (India) P Thombare	7	6
4	(Croatia) M Dražić (Georgia (country)) E Gorgodze	5	2
3	(Switzerland) C Naef (Brazil) L Pigossi	4	6	[10]
2	(Kazakhstan) Z Kulambayeva (Greece) S Sakellaridi	6	2	[6]

Final
1	(United Kingdom) E Appleton (India) P Thombare	6	1	[8]
3	(Switzerland) C Naef (Brazil) L Pigossi	4	6	[10]
