= 2021 Zagreb Ladies Open – Doubles =

Doubles
- 2021 Zagreb Ladies Open

Final
- Champions: (Austria) Barbara Haas (Poland) Katarzyna Kawa
- Runners-up: (Romania) Andreea Prisăcariu (Slovenia) Nika Radišić
- Score: 7–6^{(7–1)}, 5–7, [10–6]

Events
| Singles | Doubles |
| ← 2020 · | Zagreb Ladies Open | · 2022 → |

Silvia Njirić and Dejana Radanović were the defending champions but chose not to participate.

Barbara Haas and Katarzyna Kawa won the title, defeating Andreea Prisăcariu and Nika Radišić in the final, 7–6^{(7–1)}, 5–7, [10–6].

== Seeds ==
1. (Switzerland) Xenia Knoll / (Romania) Elena-Gabriela Ruse (quarterfinals, retired)
2. (Russia) Sofya Lansere / (Russia) Kamilla Rakhimova (semifinals)
3. (Austria) Barbara Haas / (Poland) Katarzyna Kawa (champions)
4. (Russia) Vitalia Diatchenko / (Russia) Natela Dzalamidze (first round)

== Draw ==
=== Key ===
- Q = Qualifier
- WC = Wild card
- LL = Lucky loser
- Alt = Alternate
- SE = Special exempt
- PR = Protected ranking
- ITF = ITF entry
- JE = Junior exempt
- w/o = Walkover
- r = Retired
- d = Defaulted
- SR = Special ranking

=== Draw ===
First round
(Georgia (country)) M Bolkvadze (Spain) C Bucșa | 7 | 5 | [10]
(Croatia) M Dražić (Bosnia and Herzegovina) D Herdželaš | 5 | 7 | [1]
4 | (Russia) V Diatchenko (Russia) N Dzalamidze | 1 | 0
(Romania) A Prisăcariu (Slovenia) N Radišić | 6 | 6
(Belgium) M Benoît (Italy) C Rosatello | 7 | 6
(Croatia) P Marčinko (Croatia) A Ružić | 5 | 2
(Slovenia) D Jakupović (Russia) I Khromacheva | 3 | 2
(Croatia) L Bošković (North Macedonia) L Gjorcheska | 6 | 6
(Croatia) I Primorac (Croatia) T Würth | 3 | 6 | [8]
3 | (Austria) B Haas (Poland) K Kawa | 6 | 2 | [10]
(South Korea) N-l Han (Canada) R Marino | 2 | 3
(Russia) A Gasanova (Hungary) RL Jani | 6 | 6

Quarterfinals
1 | (Switzerland) X Knoll (Romania) E-G Ruse | 5 | 1^{r}
(Georgia (country)) M Bolkvadze (Spain) C Bucșa | 7 | 4
(Romania) A Prisăcariu (Slovenia) N Radišić | 2 | 6 | [10]
(Belgium) M Benoît (Italy) C Rosatello | 6 | 3 | [6]
(Croatia) L Bošković (North Macedonia) L Gjorcheska | 4 | 3
3 | (Austria) B Haas (Poland) K Kawa | 6 | 6
(Russia) A Gasanova (Hungary) RL Jani | 6 | 5 | [8]
2 | (Russia) S Lansere (Russia) K Rakhimova | 2 | 7 | [10]

Semifinals
(Georgia (country)) M Bolkvadze (Spain) C Bucșa | 6^{6} | 5
(Romania) A Prisăcariu (Slovenia) N Radišić | 7^{8} | 7
3 | (Austria) B Haas (Poland) K Kawa | 6 | 6
2 | (Russia) S Lansere (Russia) K Rakhimova | 4 | 4

Final
(Romania) A Prisăcariu (Slovenia) N Radišić | 6^{1} | 7 | [6]
3 | (Austria) B Haas (Poland) K Kawa | 7^{7} | 5 | [10]
