= 2023 Zagreb Ladies Open – Doubles =

Doubles
- 2023 Zagreb Ladies Open

Final
- Champions: (Greece) Valentini Grammatikopoulou (Slovenia) Dalila Jakupović
- Runners-up: (France) Carole Monnet (Croatia) Antonia Ružić
- Score: 6–2, 7–5

Events
Singles	Doubles
← 2022 ·	Zagreb Ladies Open	· 2024 →

Anastasia Dețiuc and Katarina Zavatska were the defending champions but chose not to participate.

Valentini Grammatikopoulou and Dalila Jakupović won the title, defeating Carole Monnet and Antonia Ružić in the final, 6–2, 7–5.

== Seeds ==
1. (Slovenia) Veronika Erjavec / (Ukraine) Valeriya Strakhova (semifinals)
2. (Greece) Valentini Grammatikopoulou / (Slovenia) Dalila Jakupović (champions)
3. (United Kingdom) Naiktha Bains / (United Kingdom) Maia Lumsden (semifinals)
4. (United Kingdom) Lauryn John-Baptiste / (United Kingdom) Emily Webley-Smith (first round)

== Draw ==
=== Key ===
- Q = Qualifier
- WC = Wild card
- LL = Lucky loser
- Alt = Alternate
- SE = Special exempt
- PR = Protected ranking
- ITF = ITF entry
- JE = Junior exempt
- w/o = Walkover
- r = Retired
- d = Defaulted
- SR = Special ranking

First round
(Croatia) G Marić (Croatia) A Mukić	0	0
(Croatia) J Fett (Croatia) I Primorac	6	6
4	(United Kingdom) L John-Baptiste (United Kingdom) E Webley-Smith	5	6	[5]
(Italy) S Rocchetti (Italy) M Spigarelli	7	4	[10]
(Croatia) R Derniković (Croatia) D Mišković	2	6	[7]
(France) C Monnet (Croatia) A Ružić	6	4	[10]
(Czech Republic) D Hrdinková (Slovakia) L Svatíková	7	7
(Netherlands) I Haverlag (Cyprus) R Șerban	5	5
V Borodulina (Croatia) N Tomeljak	6	6
(Croatia) L Jurković (Croatia) L Šumak	2	3

Quarterfinals
1	(Slovenia) V Erjavec (Ukraine) V Strakhova	w/o
(Croatia) J Fett (Croatia) I Primorac
(Italy) S Rocchetti (Italy) M Spigarelli
(France) C Monnet (Croatia) A Ružić	w/o
(Czech Republic) D Hrdinková (Slovakia) L Svatíková	4	1
3	(United Kingdom) N Bains (United Kingdom) M Lumsden	6	6
V Borodulina (Croatia) N Tomeljak	2	2
2	(Greece) V Grammatikopoulou (Slovenia) D Jakupović	6	6

Semifinals
1	(Slovenia) V Erjavec (Ukraine) V Strakhova	5	6^{1}
(France) C Monnet (Croatia) A Ružić	7	7^{7}
3	(United Kingdom) N Bains (United Kingdom) M Lumsden	4	6	[5]
2	(Greece) V Grammatikopoulou (Slovenia) D Jakupović	6	1	[10]

Final
(France) C Monnet (Croatia) A Ružić	2	5
2	(Greece) V Grammatikopoulou (Slovenia) D Jakupović	6	7
