= 2022 Zagreb Ladies Open – Singles =

Singles
- 2022 Zagreb Ladies Open

Final
- Champion: (Germany) Jule Niemeier
- Runner-up: (Hungary) Réka Luca Jani
- Score: 6–2, 6–2

Events
Singles	Doubles
← 2021 ·	Zagreb Ladies Open	· 2023 →

Anhelina Kalinina was the defending champion but chose not to participate.

Jule Niemeier won the title, defeating Réka Luca Jani in the final, 6–2, 6–2.

== Seeds ==
1. (Croatia) Donna Vekić (first round)
2. (Germany) Jule Niemeier (champion)
3. (Hungary) Réka Luca Jani (final)
4. (Argentina) Paula Ormaechea (second round)
5. (Slovenia) Polona Hercog (first round)
6. (Greece) Despina Papamichail (second round)
7. (Germany) Anna-Lena Friedsam (first round, retired)
8. (Czech Republic) Linda Nosková (second round)

== Draw ==
=== Key ===
- Q = Qualifier
- WC = Wild card
- LL = Lucky loser
- Alt = Alternate
- SE = Special exempt
- PR = Protected ranking
- ITF = ITF entry
- JE = Junior exempt
- w/o = Walkover
- r = Retired
- d = Defaulted
- SR = Special ranking

=== Finals ===
Semifinals
(Bosnia and Herzegovina) Dea Herdželaš	0	0^{r}
3	(Hungary) Réka Luca Jani	6	3
WC	(Croatia) Petra Marčinko	6^{4}	1
2	(Germany) Jule Niemeier	7^{7}	6

Final
3	(Hungary) Réka Luca Jani	2	2
2	(Germany) Jule Niemeier	6	6

=== Top half ===
First round
1/WC	(Croatia) D Vekić	4	4
(Australia) J Fourlis	6	6
(Bosnia and Herzegovina) D Herdželaš	5	6	6
WC	(Croatia) L Ćirić Bagarić	7	3	1
(Liechtenstein) K von Deichmann	6	2	6
(Slovakia) V Kužmová	3	6	2
Q	(Croatia) T Lukas	6	4
7	(Germany) A-L Friedsam	0	1^{r}
3	(Hungary) RL Jani	6	6
(Austria) J Grabher	3	2
Q	(Slovenia) N Potočnik	6	7
(United States) H Chang	2	5
(Austria) B Haas	4	6	2
Q	(Croatia) T Würth	6	2	6
Q	(Croatia) A Ružić	7	6
5	(Slovenia) P Hercog	5	3

Second round
(Australia) J Fourlis	3	3
(Bosnia and Herzegovina) D Herdželaš	6	6
(Liechtenstein) K von Deichmann	3	6	3
Q	(Croatia) T Lukas	6	3	6
3	(Hungary) RL Jani	7^{8}	6
Q	(Slovenia) N Potočnik	6^{6}	4
Q	(Croatia) T Würth	4	1
Q	(Croatia) A Ružić	6	6

Quarterfinals
(Bosnia and Herzegovina) D Herdželaš	1	7	6
Q	(Croatia) T Lukas	6	5	4
3	(Hungary) RL Jani	6	6
Q	(Croatia) A Ružić	4	1

Semifinals
(Bosnia and Herzegovina) D Herdželaš	0	0^{r}
3	(Hungary) RL Jani	6	3

=== Bottom half ===
First round
6	(Greece) D Papamichail	3	3
(Croatia) J Fett	6	1^{r}
(Italy) C Ferrando	6	4	5
WC	(Croatia) P Marčinko	4	6	7
(Finland) A Kulikova	4	7	4
(Ukraine) K Zavatska	6	5	6
WC	(Serbia) L Radivojević	2	3
4	(Argentina) P Ormaechea	6	6
8	(Czech Republic) L Nosková	7	7
Q	(Croatia) L Bošković	5	5
Q	E Makarova	6	4	2
I Shymanovich	4	6	6
Q	(Germany) E Lys	6	4
N Vikhlyantseva	4	1^{r}
Q	(Slovenia) Ž Falkner	2	4
2	(Germany) J Niemeier	6	6

Second round
6	(Greece) D Papamichail	1	3
WC	(Croatia) P Marčinko	6	6
(Ukraine) K Zavatska	6	6
4	(Argentina) P Ormaechea	1	0
8	(Czech Republic) L Nosková	3	7	0
I Shymanovich	6	5	6
Q	(Germany) E Lys	0^{r}
2	(Germany) J Niemeier	3

Quarterfinals
WC	(Croatia) P Marčinko	6	6
(Ukraine) K Zavatska	3	1
I Shymanovich	4	6^{1}
2	(Germany) J Niemeier	6	7^{7}

Semifinals
WC	(Croatia) P Marčinko	6^{4}	1
2	(Germany) J Niemeier	7^{7}	6
