= 2023 Zagreb Ladies Open – Singles =

Singles
- 2023 Zagreb Ladies Open

Final
- Champion: (Romania) Jaqueline Cristian
- Runner-up: (Germany) Ella Seidel
- Score: 6–1, 3–6, 7–6^{(7–0)}

Events
Singles	Doubles
← 2022 ·	Zagreb Ladies Open	· 2024 →

Jule Niemeier was the defending champion but chose not to participate.

Jaqueline Cristian won the title, defeating Ella Seidel in the final, 6–1, 3–6, 7–6^{(7–0)}.

== Seeds ==
1. (France) Diane Parry (semifinals)
2. (Hungary) Réka Luca Jani (first round)
3. (Romania) Jaqueline Cristian (champion)
4. (United Kingdom) Heather Watson (second round)
5. (France) Séléna Janicijevic (second round)
6. (Uzbekistan) Nigina Abduraimova (first round)
7. (France) Carole Monnet (semifinals)
8. (Cyprus) Raluca Șerban (second round)

== Draw ==
=== Key ===
- Q = Qualifier
- WC = Wild card
- LL = Lucky loser
- Alt = Alternate
- SE = Special exempt
- PR = Protected ranking
- ITF = ITF entry
- JE = Junior exempt
- w/o = Walkover
- r = Retired
- d = Defaulted
- SR = Special ranking

=== Finals ===
Semifinals
1	(France) Diane Parry	4	4
Q	(Germany) Ella Seidel	6	6
3	(Romania) Jaqueline Cristian	6	6
7	(France) Carole Monnet	4	3

Final
Q	(Germany) Ella Seidel	1	6	6^{0}
3	(Romania) Jaqueline Cristian	6	3	7^{7}

=== Top half ===
First round
1	(France) D Parry	6	6
Q	(Italy) S Rocchetti	2	0
(Greece) V Grammatikopoulou	7	5	6
(Poland) M Chwalińska	5	7	4
Q	(Serbia) L Radivojević	3	6	2
E Makarova	6	3	6
Q	(Slovenia) V Erjavec	3	5
5	(France) S Janicijevic	6	7
4	(United Kingdom) H Watson	6	5	6
Q	(Slovakia) L Svatíková	4	7	4
WC	(Croatia) I Primorac	1	1
(North Macedonia) L Gjorcheska	6	6
(Romania) M Bulgaru	6	5	5
Q	(Germany) E Seidel	3	7	7
(France) H Tan	5	7^{7}	5
8	(Cyprus) R Șerban	7	6^{4}	7

Second round
1	(France) D Parry	6	6^{1}	6
(Greece) V Grammatikopoulou	4	7^{7}	1
E Makarova	4	6	6
5	(France) S Janicijevic	6	3	3
4	(United Kingdom) H Watson	7^{7}	4	6^{7}
(North Macedonia) L Gjorcheska	6^{2}	6	7^{9}
Q	(Germany) E Seidel	7	6
8	(Cyprus) R Șerban	5	2

Quarterfinals
1	(France) D Parry	6	7^{7}
E Makarova	1	6^{5}
(North Macedonia) L Gjorcheska	3	4
Q	(Germany) E Seidel	6	6

Semifinals
1	(France) D Parry	4	4
Q	(Germany) E Seidel	6	6

=== Bottom half ===
First round
6	(Uzbekistan) N Abduraimova	4	6^{9}
(Germany) N Noha Akugue	6	7^{11}
WC	(Croatia) J Fett	6	6
Q	(Czech Republic) D Hrdinková	4	2
(Croatia) T Lukas	6^{11}	0^{r}
(Colombia) E Arango	7^{13}	3
Q	(Australia) Ar Rodionova	3	4
3	(Romania) J Cristian	6	6
7	(France) C Monnet	6	6
WC	(Croatia) D Mišković	2	2
(Croatia) A Ružić	5	6	6
WC	(Croatia) L Ćirić Bagarić	7	1	3
Q	(Turkey) Z Sönmez	6	2	6
(Slovenia) D Jakupović	2	6	3
(Croatia) P Marčinko	6	4	7
2	(Hungary) RL Jani	3	6	5

Second round
(Germany) N Noha Akugue	3	5
WC	(Croatia) J Fett	6	7
(Colombia) E Arango	4	2
3	(Romania) J Cristian	6	6
7	(France) C Monnet	6	6
(Croatia) A Ružić	2	1
Q	(Turkey) Z Sönmez	6	7
(Croatia) P Marčinko	4	5

Quarterfinals
WC	(Croatia) J Fett	5	4
3	(Romania) J Cristian	7	6
7	(France) C Monnet	6	6
Q	(Turkey) Z Sönmez	2	3

Semifinals
3	(Romania) J Cristian	6	6
7	(France) C Monnet	4	3
