= 2025 Zagreb Ladies Open =

Tennis tournament

- Date: 17–21 June 2025
- Edition: 15th
- Category: ITF Women's World Tennis Tour
- Draw: 32S / 16D
- Prize money: $60,000
- Surface: Clay / Outdoor
- Location: Zagreb, Croatia
- Venue: Tenis centar Maksimir

Champions

Singles
- (Czech Republic) Dominika Šalková

Doubles
- (China) Feng Shuo / (Japan) Aoi Ito
← 2024 ·	Zagreb Ladies Open	· 2026 →

The 2025 Zagreb Ladies Open was a professional tennis tournament play on outdoor clay courts. It was the fifteenth edition of the tournament, which was part of the 2025 ITF Women's World Tennis Tour. It took place in Zagreb, Croatia, between 17 and 21 June 2025.

== Champions ==
=== Singles ===
- (Czech Republic) Dominika Šalková def. (Croatia) Tara Würth 2–6, 6–3, 6–3

=== Doubles ===
- (China) Feng Shuo / (Japan) Aoi Ito def. Arina Bulatova / (Greece) Martha Matoula 7–5, 6–3

== Singles main draw entrants ==
=== Seeds ===
Country	Player	Rank	Seed
NED	Arantxa Rus	88	1
JPN	Aoi Ito	102	2
LIE	Kathinka von Deichmann	154	3
ARG	Julia Riera	200	4
ITA	Giorgia Pedone	211	5
	Ekaterina Makarova	221	6
CZE	Dominika Šalková	224	7
FRA	Selena Janicijevic	227	8

- Rankings are as of 9 June 2025.

=== Other entrants ===
The following players received wildcards into the singles main draw:

- (Croatia) Lucija Ćirić Bagarić
- (Croatia) Dora Mišković
- (Croatia) Iva Primorac
- (Croatia) Sara Svetac

The following player received entry into the singles main draw as a junior exempt:

- (Italy) Tyra Caterina Grant

The following players received entry from the qualifying draw:

- (Romania) Georgia Crăciun
- (Italy) Samira De Stefano
- (North Macedonia) Lina Gjorcheska
- (Serbia) Teodora Kostović
- (Romania) Gabriela Lee
- (Greece) Martha Matoula
- (Sweden) Kajsa Rinaldo Persson
- (Serbia) Mia Ristić
