= 2024 Zagreb Ladies Open =

Tennis tournament

- Date: 13–18 May 2023
- Edition: 14th
- Category: ITF Women's World Tennis Tour
- Prize money: $60,000
- Surface: Clay / Outdoor
- Location: Zagreb, Croatia

Champions

Singles
- (Croatia) Tara Würth

Doubles
- (Switzerland) Céline Naef / (Brazil) Laura Pigossi
| ← 2023 · | Zagreb Ladies Open | · 2025 → |

The 2024 Zagreb Ladies Open was a professional tennis tournament play on outdoor clay courts. It was the fourteenth edition of the tournament, which was part of the 2024 ITF Women's World Tennis Tour. It took place in Zagreb, Croatia, between 13 and 18 May 2024.

== Champions ==
=== Singles ===
- (Croatia) Tara Würth def. (Serbia) Lola Radivojević, 7–5, 6–3

=== Doubles ===
- (Switzerland) Céline Naef / (Brazil) Laura Pigossi def. (United Kingdom) Emily Appleton / (India) Prarthana Thombare, 4–6, 6–1, [10–8]

== Singles main draw entrants ==
=== Seeds ===
| Country | Player | Rank | Seed |
|---|---|---|---|
| BRA | Laura Pigossi | 125 | 1 |
| CRO | Jana Fett | 128 | 2 |
| NED | Arianne Hartono | 140 | 3 |
| FRA | Léolia Jeanjean | 145 | 4 |
| SUI | Céline Naef | 153 | 5 |
| PHI | Alex Eala | 162 | 6 |
| SUI | Simona Waltert | 166 | 7 |
| ARG | Martina Capurro Taborda | 167 | 8 |

- Rankings are as of 6 May 2024.

=== Other entrants ===
The following players received wildcards into the singles main draw:

- (Croatia) Dora Mišković
- (Croatia) Iva Primorac
- (Serbia) Lola Radivojević
- (Croatia) Tara Würth

The following player received entry into the singles main draw as a special exempt:

- (Bulgaria) Gergana Topalova

The following players received entry from the qualifying draw:

- (Turkey) Ayla Aksu
- (France) Sara Cakarevic
- (Slovakia) Laura Cíleková
- (Georgia (country)) Ekaterine Gorgodze
- (Kazakhstan) Zhibek Kulambayeva
- (Czech Republic) Barbora Palicová
- (Greece) Sapfo Sakellaridi
- (Italy) Dalila Spiteri

The following player received entry as a lucky loser:

- Sofya Lansere
