= 2024 Zagreb Ladies Open – Singles =

Singles
- 2024 Zagreb Ladies Open

Final
- Champion: (Croatia) Tara Würth
- Runner-up: (Serbia) Lola Radivojević
- Score: 7–5, 6–3

Events
Singles	Doubles
← 2023 ·	Zagreb Ladies Open	· 2025 →

Jaqueline Cristian was the defending champion but chose not to participate.

Tara Würth won the title, defeating Lola Radivojević in the final, 7–5, 6–3.

== Seeds ==
1. (Brazil) Laura Pigossi (second round)
2. (Croatia) Jana Fett (second round)
3. (Netherlands) Arianne Hartono (first round)
4. (France) Léolia Jeanjean (quarterfinals)
5. (Switzerland) Céline Naef (first round)
6. (Philippines) Alex Eala (first round)
7. (Switzerland) Simona Waltert (second round)
8. (Argentina) Martina Capurro Taborda (quarterfinals)

== Draw ==
=== Key ===
- Q = Qualifier
- WC = Wild card
- LL = Lucky loser
- Alt = Alternate
- SE = Special exempt
- PR = Protected ranking
- ITF = ITF entry
- JE = Junior exempt
- w/o = Walkover
- r = Retired
- d = Defaulted
- SR = Special ranking

=== Finals ===
Semifinals
(Switzerland) Jil Teichmann	3	4
WC	(Serbia) Lola Radivojević	6	6
WC	(Croatia) Tara Würth	6	6
SE	(Bulgaria) Gergana Topalova	3	1

Final
WC	(Serbia) Lola Radivojević	5	3
WC	(Croatia) Tara Würth	7	6

=== Top half ===
First round
1	(Brazil) L Pigossi	6	6
Q	(Greece) S Sakellaridi	2	2
WC	(Croatia) I Primorac	6	6
Q	(Italy) D Spiteri	2	4
(Switzerland) J Teichmann	6	6
WC	(Croatia) D Mišković	3	3
(Croatia) P Marčinko	2	4
7	(Switzerland) S Waltert	6	6
3	(Netherlands) A Hartono	6	2	4
Q	(Kazakhstan) Z Kulambayeva	2	6	6
Q	(Turkey) A Aksu	1	5
(Japan) H Sakatsume	6	7
WC	(Serbia) L Radivojević	6	6
(Croatia) L Bošković	3	2
(Croatia) T Lukas	7	3	6
6	(Philippines) A Eala	5	6	4

Second round
1	(Brazil) L Pigossi	3	0
WC	(Croatia) I Primorac	6	6
(Switzerland) J Teichmann	6	3	7^{7}
7	(Switzerland) S Waltert	2	6	6^{4}
Q	(Kazakhstan) Z Kulambayeva	6	6
(Japan) H Sakatsume	2	4
WC	(Serbia) L Radivojević	6	6
(Croatia) T Lukas	2	1

Quarterfinals
WC	(Croatia) I Primorac	1	1
(Switzerland) J Teichmann	6	6
Q	(Kazakhstan) Z Kulambayeva	3	6^{5}
WC	(Serbia) L Radivojević	6	7^{7}

Semifinals
(Switzerland) J Teichmann	3	4
WC	(Serbia) L Radivojević	6	6

=== Bottom half ===
First round
5	(Switzerland) C Naef	4	6	5
(Croatia) A Ružić	6	4	7
WC	(Croatia) T Würth	6	6
Q	(Czech Republic) B Palicová	3	2
Q	(France) S Cakarevic	6	1	7
J Kolodynska	3	6	5
(Australia) J Fourlis	4	6	3
4	(France) L Jeanjean	6	1	6
8	(Argentina) M Capurro Taborda	6	4	6
(Cyprus) R Șerban	3	6	0
Q	(Slovakia) L Cíleková	2	2
A Falei	6	6
SE	(Bulgaria) G Topalova	6	6
Q	(Georgia (country)) E Gorgodze	2	1
LL	S Lansere	6	5	2
2	(Croatia) J Fett	3	7	6

Second round
(Croatia) A Ružić	1	4
WC	(Croatia) T Würth	6	6
Q	(France) S Cakarevic	6	4	1
4	(France) L Jeanjean	4	6	6
8	(Argentina) M Capurro Taborda	6	6
A Falei	1	1
SE	(Bulgaria) G Topalova	6	7^{7}
2	(Croatia) J Fett	4	6^{4}

Quarterfinals
WC	(Croatia) T Würth	2	6	6
4	(France) L Jeanjean	6	4	4
8	(Argentina) M Capurro Taborda	6^{10}	2
SE	(Bulgaria) G Topalova	7^{12}	6

Semifinals
WC	(Croatia) T Würth	6	6
SE	(Bulgaria) G Topalova	3	1
