= 2021 Zagreb Ladies Open =

Tennis tournament

- Date: 26 April–2 May 2021
- Edition: 10th
- Category: ITF Women's World Tennis Tour
- Prize money: $60,000
- Surface: Clay
- Location: Zagreb, Croatia

Champions

Singles
- (Ukraine) Anhelina Kalinina

Doubles
- (Austria) Barbara Haas / (Poland) Katarzyna Kawa
| ← 2020 · | Zagreb Ladies Open | · 2022 → |

The 2021 Zagreb Ladies Open was a professional women's tennis tournament played on outdoor clay courts. It was the tenth edition of the tournament which was part of the 2021 ITF Women's World Tennis Tour. It took place in Zagreb, Croatia between 26 April and 2 May 2021.

== Singles main-draw entrants ==
=== Seeds ===
| Country | Player | Rank^{1} | Seed |
|---|---|---|---|
| ITA | Elisabetta Cocciaretto | 111 | 1 |
| BEL | Greet Minnen | 119 | 2 |
| POL | Katarzyna Kawa | 135 | 3 |
| RUS | Kamilla Rakhimova | 143 | 4 |
| SVK | Kristína Kučová | 151 | 5 |
| JPN | Kurumi Nara | 153 | 6 |
| AUT | Barbara Haas | 156 | 7 |
| ~~SRB~~ | ~~Olga Danilović~~ | ~~162~~ | ~~8~~ |

- ^{1} Rankings are as of 19 April 2021.

=== Other entrants ===
The following players received wildcards into the singles main draw:

- (Croatia) Lea Bošković
- (Serbia) Mihaela Đaković
- (Croatia) Jana Fett
- (Croatia) Petra Marčinko

The following players received entry using protected rankings:

- (Romania) Alexandra Dulgheru
- (Russia) Irina Khromacheva

The following player received entry using a junior exempt:

- (France) Diane Parry

The following players received entry from the qualifying draw:

- (Slovenia) Dalila Jakupović
- (Hungary) Réka Luca Jani
- (Canada) Rebecca Marino
- (Croatia) Tereza Mrdeža
- (Germany) Jule Niemeier
- (Italy) Jessica Pieri
- (Romania) Andreea Prisăcariu
- (Croatia) Tara Würth

The following players received entry as a lucky losers:

- (Italy) Federica Arcidiacono
- (Belgium) Marie Benoît

== Champions ==
=== Singles ===
- (Ukraine) Anhelina Kalinina def. (Russia) Kamilla Rakhimova, 6–1, 6–3

=== Doubles ===
- (Austria) Barbara Haas / (Poland) Katarzyna Kawa def. (Romania) Andreea Prisăcariu / (Slovenia) Nika Radišić, 7–6^{(7–1)}, 5–7, [10–6]
