= 2021 Zagreb Ladies Open – Singles =

Singles
- 2021 Zagreb Ladies Open

Final
- Champion: (Ukraine) Anhelina Kalinina
- Runner-up: (Russia) Kamilla Rakhimova
- Score: 6–1, 6–3

Events
Singles	Doubles
← 2020 ·	Zagreb Ladies Open	· 2022 →

Ana Konjuh was the defending champion but chose to compete in Madrid instead.

Anhelina Kalinina won the title, defeating Kamilla Rakhimova in the final, 6–1, 6–3.

== Seeds ==
1. (Italy) Elisabetta Cocciaretto (second round)
2. (Belgium) Greet Minnen (first round)
3. (Poland) Katarzyna Kawa (first round)
4. (Russia) Kamilla Rakhimova (final)
5. (Slovakia) Kristína Kučová (quarterfinals)
6. (Japan) Kurumi Nara (first round)
7. (Austria) Barbara Haas (quarterfinals)
8. (Serbia) Olga Danilović (withdrew)

== Draw ==
=== Key ===
- Q = Qualifier
- WC = Wild card
- LL = Lucky loser
- Alt = Alternate
- SE = Special exempt
- PR = Protected ranking
- ITF = ITF entry
- JE = Junior exempt
- w/o = Walkover
- r = Retired
- d = Defaulted
- SR = Special ranking

=== Finals ===
Semifinals
PR	(Romania) Alexandra Dulgheru	4	5
4	(Russia) Kamilla Rakhimova	6	7
(Ukraine) Anhelina Kalinina	6	6
Q	(Italy) Jessica Pieri	2	0

Final
4	(Russia) Kamilla Rakhimova	1	3
(Ukraine) Anhelina Kalinina	6	6

=== Top half ===
First round
1	(Italy) E Cocciaretto	4	6	7^{10}
(Slovakia) R Šramková	6	3	6^{8}
PR	(Romania) A Dulgheru	6	6
LL	(Italy) F Arcidiacono	0	1
PR	(Russia) I Khromacheva	4	6	4
(Russia) A Gasanova	6	4	6
WC	(Serbia) M Đaković	1	4
5	(Slovakia) K Kučová	6	6
4	(Russia) K Rakhimova	6	4	6
(Netherlands) L Pattinama Kerkhove	1	6	0
Q	(Croatia) T Mrdeža	2	6	6
Q	(Romania) A Prisăcariu	6	3	3
WC	(Croatia) J Fett	6	6
WC	(Croatia) L Bošković	2	1
Q	(Hungary) RL Jani	6	6
LL	(Belgium) M Benoît	1	2

Second round
1	(Italy) E Cocciaretto	4	1
PR	(Romania) A Dulgheru	6	6
(Russia) A Gasanova	5	2
5	(Slovakia) K Kučová	7	6
4	(Russia) K Rakhimova	6	2	7
Q	(Croatia) T Mrdeža	4	6	5
WC	(Croatia) J Fett	6	6
Q	(Hungary) RL Jani	4	3

Quarterfinals
PR	(Romania) A Dulgheru	1	6	6
5	(Slovakia) K Kučová	6	2	1
4	(Russia) K Rakhimova	6	4	6
WC	(Croatia) J Fett	3	6	4

Semifinals
PR	(Romania) A Dulgheru	4	5
4	(Russia) K Rakhimova	6	7

=== Bottom half ===
First round
6	(Japan) K Nara	4	3
WC	(Croatia) P Marčinko	6	6
Q	(Germany) J Niemeier	6	7^{9}
Q	(Slovenia) D Jakupović	4	6^{7}
(Ukraine) A Kalinina	6	6^{5}	6
(Georgia (country)) M Bolkvadze	3	7^{7}	2
JE	(France) D Parry	6	5	6
3	(Poland) K Kawa	4	7	4
7	(Austria) B Haas	6^{5}	6	6
(Spain) C Bucșa	7^{7}	1	2
Q	(Croatia) T Würth	6	4	7^{7}
Q	(Canada) R Marino	4	6	6^{4}
Q	(Italy) J Pieri	2	6	6
(Italy) M Di Giuseppe	6	2	2
(Romania) E-G Ruse	6	6
2	(Belgium) G Minnen	3	1

Second round
WC	(Croatia) P Marčinko	1	2
Q	(Germany) J Niemeier	6	6
(Ukraine) A Kalinina	6^{0}	6	6
JE	(France) D Parry	7^{7}	3	2
7	(Austria) B Haas	6	6
Q	(Croatia) T Würth	3	4
Q	(Italy) J Pieri	4	7^{7}	6
(Romania) E-G Ruse	6	6^{5}	3

Quarterfinals
Q	(Germany) J Niemeier	5	4
(Ukraine) A Kalinina	7	6
7	(Austria) B Haas	2	7	1
Q	(Italy) J Pieri	6	5	6

Semifinals
(Ukraine) A Kalinina	6	6
Q	(Italy) J Pieri	2	0
