= 2022 Zagreb Ladies Open – Doubles =

Doubles
- 2022 Zagreb Ladies Open

Final
- Champions: (Czech Republic) Anastasia Dețiuc (Ukraine) Katarina Zavatska
- Runners-up: (North Macedonia) Lina Gjorcheska; Irina Khromacheva
- Score: 6–4, 6–7^{(5–7)}, [11–9]

Events
Singles	Doubles
← 2021 ·	Zagreb Ladies Open	· 2023 →

Barbara Haas and Katarzyna Kawa were the defending champions but chose not to participate.

Anastasia Dețiuc and Katarina Zavatska won the title, defeating Lina Gjorcheska and Irina Khromacheva in the final, 6–4, 6–7^{(5–7)}, [11–9].

== Seeds ==
1. (Germany) Julia Lohoff / (Czech Republic) Renata Voráčová (withdrew)
2. (Switzerland) Xenia Knoll / (Romania) Andreea Mitu (semifinals)
3. (North Macedonia) Lina Gjorcheska / Irina Khromacheva (final)
4. (Hungary) Adrienn Nagy / Maria Timofeeva (first round)

== Draw ==
=== Key ===
- Q = Qualifier
- WC = Wild card
- LL = Lucky loser
- Alt = Alternate
- SE = Special exempt
- PR = Protected ranking
- ITF = ITF entry
- JE = Junior exempt
- w/o = Walkover
- r = Retired
- d = Defaulted
- SR = Special ranking

=== Draw ===
First round
Alt	(Slovenia) V Erjavec (Slovenia) N Potočnik	6	6
(Croatia) L Bošković (Croatia) T Lukas	4	4
(Japan) M Kawamura (Japan) F Kozaki	6	6
WC	(Croatia) M Dražić (Germany) A Klasen	4	3
4	(Hungary) A Nagy; M Timofeeva	0	6	[14]
(Romania) M Bulgaru (Romania) OG Simion	6	2	[16]
(Greece) D Papamichail (United Kingdom) E Webley-Smith	4	1
(Czech Republic) A Dețiuc (Ukraine) K Zavatska	6	6
(Australia) J Fourlis (Argentina) P Ormaechea	3	6	[3]
WC	(Croatia) L Ćirić Bagarić (Croatia) T Würth	6	3	[10]
(Bosnia and Herzegovina) D Herdželaš (Slovenia) D Jakupović	2	6	[8]
3	(North Macedonia) L Gjorcheska; I Khromacheva	6	4	[10]
(Brazil) I Gamarra Martins; I Shymanovich	6	6
WC	(Croatia) L Ivković (Croatia) L Šumak	3	0
(Germany) A-L Friedsam (Germany) L Papadakis	2	6	[8]
2	(Switzerland) X Knoll (Romania) A Mitu	6	2	[10]

Quarterfinals
Alt	(Slovenia) V Erjavec (Slovenia) N Potočnik	6	6
(Japan) M Kawamura (Japan) F Kozaki	4	3
(Romania) M Bulgaru (Romania) OG Simion	2	7^{7}	[9]
(Czech Republic) A Dețiuc (Ukraine) K Zavatska	6	6^{5}	[11]
WC	(Croatia) L Ćirić Bagarić (Croatia) T Würth	3	4
3	(North Macedonia) L Gjorcheska; I Khromacheva	6	6
(Brazil) I Gamarra Martins; I Shymanovich	6	6^{4}	[10]
2	(Switzerland) X Knoll (Romania) A Mitu	3	7^{7}	[12]

Semifinals
Alt	(Slovenia) V Erjavec (Slovenia) N Potočnik	5	5
(Czech Republic) A Dețiuc (Ukraine) K Zavatska	7	7
3	(North Macedonia) L Gjorcheska; I Khromacheva	6	6
2	(Switzerland) X Knoll (Romania) A Mitu	2	3

Final
(Czech Republic) A Dețiuc (Ukraine) K Zavatska	6	6^{5}	[11]
3	(North Macedonia) L Gjorcheska; I Khromacheva	4	7^{7}	[9]
