= 2020 Billie Jean King Cup Europe/Africa Zone Group I – Pool A (Tallinn) =

Subsection of tennis competition

Pool A (Tallinn) of the 2020–21 Billie Jean King Cup Europe/Africa Zone Group I was one of four pools in the Europe/Africa zone of the 2020–21 Billie Jean King Cup. Three teams competed in a round robin competition, with the top teams and the bottom team proceeding to their respective sections of the play-offs: the top teams played for advancement to 2020 Billie Jean King Cup Play-offs.

== Standings ==
		UKR	CRO	BUL	RR; W–L	Set; W–L	Game; W–L	Standings
2	Ukraine		3–0	3–0	6–0	12–1 (92%)	76–40 (66%)	1
5	Croatia	0–3		2–1	2–4	5–10 (33%)	60–74 (45%)	2
10	Bulgaria	0–3	1–2		1–5	4–10 (29%)	50–72 (41%)	3

Standings are determined by: 1. number of wins; 2. number of matches; 3. in two-team ties, head-to-head records; 4. in three-team ties, (a) percentage of matches won (head-to-head records if two teams remain tied), then (b) percentage of sets won (head-to-head records if two teams remain tied), then (c) percentage of games won (head-to-head records if two teams remain tied), then (d) Fed Cup rankings.

== Round-robin ==
=== Croatia vs. Bulgaria ===
Croatia
2
Tallink Tennis Center, Tallinn, Estonia
5 February 2020
Hard (indoors)

Bulgaria
1

			1	2	3
1	(Croatia) (Bulgaria)	Lea Bošković; Isabella Shinikova	2; 6	6; 4	6; 4
2	(Croatia) (Bulgaria)	Jana Fett; Viktoriya Tomova	2; 6	4; 6
3	(Croatia) (Bulgaria)	Jana Fett / Darija Jurak; Isabella Shinikova / Viktoriya Tomova	6; 2	3; 6	6; 1

=== Ukraine vs. Bulgaria ===
Ukraine
3
Tallink Tennis Center, Tallinn, Estonia
6 February 2020
Hard (indoors)

Bulgaria
0

			1	2	3
1	(Ukraine) (Bulgaria)	Dayana Yastremska; Isabella Shinikova	6; 2	6; 1
2	(Ukraine) (Bulgaria)	Elina Svitolina; Viktoriya Tomova	7^{7} 6^{5}	6; 3
3	(Ukraine) (Bulgaria)	Lesia Tsurenko / Katarina Zavatska; Petia Arshinkova / Gergana Topalova	6; 2	6; 1

=== Ukraine vs. Croatia ===
Ukraine
3
Tallink Tennis Center, Tallinn, Estonia
7 February 2020
Hard (indoors)

Croatia
0

			1	2	3
1	(Ukraine) (Croatia)	Dayana Yastremska; Lea Bošković	6; 4	6; 4
2	(Ukraine) (Croatia)	Elina Svitolina; Jana Fett	6; 3	3; 6	6; 1
3	(Ukraine) (Croatia)	Marta Kostyuk / Katarina Zavatska; Antonia Ružić / Tara Würth	6; 4	6; 3
