= Valentini Grammatikopoulou =

Greek tennis player (born 1997)

Valentini Grammatikopoulou Βαλεντίνη Γραμματικοπούλου
- Grammatikopoulou at the 2023 French Open
- Country (sports): Greece
- Born: 9 February 1997 (age 29) Kilkis, Greece
- Height: 1.64 m (5 ft 5 in)
- Prize money: US$ 958,277

Singles
- Career record: 443–327
- Career titles: 1 WTA Challenger, 17 ITF
- Highest ranking: No. 143 (22 August 2022)
- Current ranking: No. 557 (17 August 2026)

Grand Slam singles results
- Australian Open: Q2 (2017, 2018, 2019, 2024)
- French Open: 1R (2022)
- Wimbledon: Q1 (2017, 2018, 2019, 2022, 2023, 2024)
- US Open: 2R (2021)

Doubles
- Career record: 310–183
- Career titles: 1 WTA Challenger, 37 ITF
- Highest ranking: No. 97 (15 July 2024)
- Current ranking: No. 388 (22 June 2026)

Grand Slam doubles results
- Wimbledon: 1R (2022)

Team competitions
- Fed Cup: 26–17
- Last updated on: 23 August 2026.

Valentini Grammatikopoulou (Greek: Βαλεντίνη Γραμματικοπούλου; born 9 February 1997) is a Greek tennis player. On 22 August 2022, she reached her best singles ranking of world No. 143. On 15 July 2024, she peaked at No. 97 in the WTA doubles rankings. She has won a singles and a doubles title on the WTA Challenger Tour, and in addition, 17 singles and 37 doubles titles on the ITF Women's Circuit.

Playing for Greece, Grammatikopoulou has a win–loss record of 26–17 in Billie Jean King Cup competition (as of July 2025).

== Career ==
Playing with Ulrikke Eikeri, Grammatikopoulou reached her first WTA Tour doubles final at the 2021 Lausanne Open, losing to Susan Bandecchi and Simona Waltert in a deciding champions tiebreak.

She made her major debut at the 2021 US Open as a qualifier, after attempting to qualify 12 times for a major. It marked the first time ever that three Greek players were in the US Open main draw. On her major debut, she reached the second round after defeating Anna Blinkova, 6–3, 6–2. It was her third career win at the WTA Tour-level. Grammatikopoulou lost her next match to 15th seed Elise Mertens.

Grammatikopoulou qualified for her second Grand Slam tournament at the 2022 French Open, losing in the first round to wildcard entrant Daria Saville.

In August 2022, Grammatikopoulou won her biggest singles title to date at the WTA 125 Vancouver Open, defeating Lucia Bronzetti in the final.

Partnering Despina Papamichail, she won her first WTA 125 doubles title at the 2023 Barranquilla Open, overcoming Yuliana Lizarazo and María Paulina Pérez in the final.

== Performance timelines ==
Key
W	F	SF	QF	#R	RR	Q#	DNQ	A	NH

(W) winner; (F) finalist; (SF) semifinalist; (QF) quarterfinalist; (#R) rounds 4, 3, 2, 1; (RR) round-robin stage; (Q#) qualification round; (DNQ) did not qualify; (A) absent; (NH) not held; (SR) strike rate (events won / competed); (W–L) win–loss record.
To avoid confusion and double counting, these charts are updated at the conclusion of a tournament or when the player's participation has ended.

Only main-draw results in WTA Tour, Grand Slam tournaments, Fed Cup/Billie Jean King Cup and Olympic Games are included in win–loss records.

=== Singles ===
Tournament	2017	2018	2019	2020	2021	2022	2023	2024	SR	W–L
Grand Slam tournaments
Australian Open	Q2	Q2	Q2	A	A	Q1	Q1	Q2	0 / 0	0–0
French Open	Q2	Q2	Q3	A	A	1R	Q2	Q1	0 / 1	0–1
Wimbledon	Q1	Q1	Q1	NH	A	Q1	Q1	1R	0 / 1	0–1
US Open	Q1	Q1	Q1	A	2R	A	Q1	A	0 / 1	1–1
Win–loss	0–0	0–0	0–0	0–0	1–1	0–1	0–0	0–1	0 / 3	1–3
WTA 1000
Canadian Open	A	A	A	NH	A	Q1	A	A	0 / 0	0–0
Career statistics
Tournaments	2	6	0	0	3	1	0		Career total: 12	
Overall win–loss	0–2	1–6	0–1	0–1	1–3	0–1	0–1		0 / 12	2–15
Year-end ranking	212	165	265	266	185	200	217	483	$693,438	

== WTA Tour finals ==
=== Doubles: 1 (runner-up) ===
Legend WTA 500 WTA 250 (0–1)	Finals by surface Clay (0–1)	Finals by setting Outdoor (0–1)

Result	W–L	Date	Tournament	Tier	Surface	Partner	Opponents	Score
Loss	0–1	Jul 2021	Ladies Open Lausanne, Switzerland	WTA 250	Clay	(Norway) Ulrikke Eikeri	(Switzerland) Susan Bandecchi (Switzerland) Simona Waltert	3–6, 7–6^{(7–3)}, [5–10]

== WTA 125 finals ==
=== Singles: 1 (title) ===
Result	W–L	Date	Tournament	Surface	Opponent	Score
Win	1–0	Aug 2022	Vancouver Open, Canada	Hard	(Italy) Lucia Bronzetti	6–2, 6–4

=== Doubles: 4 (1 title, 3 runner-ups) ===
Result	W–L	Date	Tournament	Surface	Partner	Opponents	Score
Loss	0–1	Dec 2021	Korea Open, South Korea	Hard (i)	(Hungary) Réka Luca Jani	(South Korea) Choi Ji-hee (South Korea) Han Na-lae	4–6, 4–6
Win	1–1	Aug 2023	Barranquilla Open, Colombia	Hard	(Greece) Despina Papamichail	(Colombia) Yuliana Lizarazo (Colombia) María Paulina Pérez	7–6^{(7–2)}, 7–5
Loss	1–2	Sep 2023	Bari Open, Italy	Clay	(France) Elixane Lechemia	(Poland) Katarzyna Kawa (Czech Republic) Anna Sisková	1–6, 2–6
Loss	1–3	Sep 2023	Open Romania Ladies, Romania	Clay	(Czech Republic) Anna Sisková	(Italy) Angelica Moratelli (Italy) Camilla Rosatello	5–7, 4–6

== ITF Circuit finals ==
=== Singles: 33 (17 titles, 16 runner-ups) ===
Legend
W40 tournaments (1–0)
W25/35 tournaments (7–8)
W10/15 tournaments (9–8)

Result	W–L	Date	Tournament	Tier	Surface	Opponent	Score
Win	1–0	Apr 2013	ITF Heraklion, Greece	W10	Carpet	(Republic of Ireland) Amy Bowtell	6–3, 6–4
Win	2–0	May 2013	ITF Heraklion, Greece	W10	Carpet	(Chinese Taipei) Lee Pei-chi	7–6^{(4)}, 3–6, 6–2
Win	3–0	Aug 2013	ITF Pirot, Serbia	W10	Clay	(Netherlands) Eva Wacanno	6–1, 6–4
Win	4–0	Sep 2014	ITF Vrnjačka Banja, Serbia	W10	Clay	(Bosnia and Herzegovina) Dea Herdželaš	1–6, 6–3, 7–6^{(5)}
Loss	4–1	Nov 2014	ITF Heraklion, Greece	W10	Hard	(Hungary) Dalma Gálfi	2–6, 6–4, 6–7^{(4)}
Loss	4–2	Apr 2015	ITF Heraklion, Greece	W10	Hard	(Greece) Maria Sakkari	2–6, 2–6
Loss	4–3	Apr 2015	ITF Heraklion, Greece	W10	Hard	(Slovakia) Viktória Kužmová	3–6, 4–6
Win	5–3	Aug 2015	ITF Oldenzaal, Netherlands	W10	Clay	(Philippines) Katharina Lehnert	7–6^{(2)}, 6–3
Loss	5–4	Aug 2015	ITF Rotterdam, Netherlands	W10	Clay	(Netherlands) Chayenne Ewijk	6–7^{(3)}, 3–6
Win	6–4	Oct 2015	ITF Port El Kantaoui, Tunisia	W10	Hard	(France) Caroline Roméo	2–6, 6–2, 6–3
Loss	6–5	Oct 2015	ITF Port El Kantaoui, Tunisia	W10	Hard	(Ukraine) Valeriya Strakhova	2–6, 0–6
Win	7–5	Oct 2015	ITF Heraklion, Greece	W10	Hard	(Turkey) Pemra Özgen	3–6, 6–3, 6–3
Win	8–5	Nov 2015	ITF Heraklion, Greece	W10	Hard	(Bulgaria) Julia Stamatova	7–5, 6–1
Loss	8–6	Jan 2016	ITF Stuttgart, Germany	W10	Hard (i)	(Russia) Anna Blinkova	6–7^{(4)}, 6–2, 2–6
Win	9–6	Jun 2016	ITF Minsk, Belarus	W25	Clay	(Russia) Anna Kalinskaya	6–3, 4–1 ret.
Loss	9–7	Jul 2016	ITF Middelburg, Netherlands	W25	Clay	(Netherlands) Quirine Lemoine	2–6, 5–7
Loss	9–8	Aug 2016	ITF Westende, Belgium	W25	Hard	(Russia) Anna Blinkova	5–7, 2–6
Loss	9–9	Aug 2016	ITF Kharkiv, Ukraine	W25	Clay	(Russia) Anna Kalinskaya	4–6, 6–1, 1–6
Win	10–9	Dec 2016	ITF Hammamet, Tunisia	W10	Hard	(Bosnia and Herzegovina) Jelena Simić	6–1, 6–3
Loss	10–10	Jul 2017	ITF Middelburg, Netherlands	W25	Clay	(Netherlands) Arantxa Rus	6–3, 2–6, 3–6
Win	11–10	Nov 2017	ITF Dakar, Senegal	W25	Hard	(South Africa) Chanel Simmonds	6–0, 7–6^{(1)}
Loss	11–11	Aug 2018	ITF Chiswick, United Kingdom	W25	Hard	(Russia) Vitalia Diatchenko	1–6, 5–7
Loss	11–12	Jun 2021	Tatarstan Open, Russia	W25	Hard	(Belarus) Anna Kubareva	1–6, 3–6
Win	12–12	Jul 2021	Telavi Open, Georgia	W25	Clay	(France) Tessah Andrianjafitrimo	7–5, 6–4
Win	13–12	May 2023	ITF Santa Margherita di Pula, Italy	W25	Clay	(Liechtenstein) Kathinka von Deichmann	6–4, 6–1
Win	14–12	Jun 2023	ITF Otočec, Slovenia	W40	Clay	(Slovakia) Rebecca Šramková	6–4, 6–4
Win	15–12	Oct 2023	ITF Sharm El Sheikh, Egypt	W25	Hard	(Czech Republic) Linda Klimovičová	7–6^{(1)}, 7–5
Loss	15–13	Nov 2024	ITF Solarino, Italy	W35	Carpet	(Chinese Taipei) Joanna Garland	7–5, 2–6, 3–6
Loss	15–14	Jun 2025	ITF Focșani, Romania	W15	Clay	(Spain) Ruth Roura Llaverias	6–7^{(4)}, 6–7^{(5)}
Loss	15–15	Jul 2025	ITF Turin, Italy	W35	Clay	(Spain) Ane Mintegi del Olmo	3–6, 1–6
Loss	15–16	May 2026	ITF Tsaghkadzor, Armenia	W15	Clay	Kristina Kroitor	1–6, 2–6
Win	16–16	Aug 2026	ITF Verbier, Switzerland	W35	Clay	(France) Jenny Lim	6–4, 6–1
Win	17–16	Oct 2026	ITF Marsa, Malta	W35	Hard	(Poland) Weronika Ewald	6–4, 6–3

=== Doubles: 65 (37 titles, 28 runner-ups) ===
Legend
W100 tournaments (1–1)
W80 tournaments (0–1)
W60/75 tournaments (5–3)
W40/50 tournaments (1–1)
W25/35 tournaments (22–15)
W10/15 tournaments (8–7)

Result	W–L	Date	Tournament	Tier	Surface	Partner	Opponents	Score
Loss	0–1	Sep 2012	ITF Engis, Belgium	W10	Clay	(Germany) Lena Lutzeier	(Germany) Carolin Daniels (Germany) Laura Schaeder	4–6, 1–6
Loss	0–2	Apr 2014	ITF Heraklion, Greece	W10	Hard	(Russia) Polina Leykina	(Hungary) Csilla Borsányi (Romania) Ilka Csöregi	6–4, 3–6, [6–10]
Loss	0–3	Apr 2014	ITF Heraklion, Greece	W10	Hard	(Russia) Natela Dzalamidze	(Belgium) Magali Kempen (Belgium) Elke Lemmens	6–1, 5–7, [8–10]
Win	1–3	Apr 2014	ITF Heraklion, Greece	W10	Hard	(Russia) Natela Dzalamidze	(Greece) Despina Papamichail (Greece) Maria Sakkari	6–7^{(6)}, 6–3, [10–5]
Win	2–3	Mar 2015	ITF Heraklion, Greece	W10	Hard	(Russia) Anastasiya Komardina	(Slovakia) Viktória Kužmová (Czech Republic) Petra Rohanová	7–5, 6–2
Win	3–3	Apr 2015	ITF Heraklion, Greece	W10	Hard	(Russia) Anastasiya Komardina	(Serbia) Barbara Bonić (Serbia) Tamara Čurović	6–2, 6–3
Win	4–3	Apr 2015	ITF Heraklion, Greece	W10	Hard	(Russia) Anastasiya Komardina	(Serbia) Tamara Čurović (Greece) Despina Papamichail	6–2, 6–2
Win	5–3	May 2015	ITF Mytilene, Greece	W10	Hard	(Netherlands) Rosalie van der Hoek	(Japan) Yoshimi Kawasaki (Romania) Daiana Negreanu	6–4, 6–3
Loss	5–4	Aug 2015	ITF Oldenzaal, Netherlands	W10	Clay	(Belarus) Sviatlana Pirazhenka	(Belgium) Steffi Distelmans (Netherlands) Kelly Versteeg	3–6, 5–7
Win	6–4	Oct 2015	ITF Port El Kantaoui, Tunisia	W10	Hard	(Bosnia and Herzegovina) Jelena Simić	(Sweden) Anette Munozova (Russia) Yana Sizikova	4–6, 6–4, [10–6]
Win	7–4	Oct 2015	ITF Port El Kantaoui, Tunisia	W10	Hard	(Ukraine) Valeriya Strakhova	(Portugal) Inês Murta (France) Pauline Payet	5–7, 6–3, [10–5]
Loss	7–5	Oct 2015	ITF Heraklion, Greece	W10	Hard	(Netherlands) Janneke Wikkerink	(Greece) Eleni Christofi (Netherlands) Phillis Vanenburg	3–6, 3–6
Loss	7–6	Mar 2016	ITF Gonesse, France	W10	Clay (i)	(Poland) Justyna Jegiołka	(France) Marine Partaud (France) Laëtitia Sarrazin	1–6, 6–3, [6–10]
Win	8–6	Jun 2016	ITF Minsk, Belarus	W25	Clay	(Russia) Anna Kalinskaya	(Norway) Ulrikke Eikeri (Brazil) Laura Pigossi	4–6, 6–1, [10–2]
Win	9–6	Jun 2016	ITF Breda, Netherlands	W10	Clay	(Belarus) Sviatlana Pirazhenka	(United States) Dasha Ivanova (Czech Republic) Petra Krejsová	7–6^{(6)}, 6–4
Loss	9–7	Jul 2016	ITF Middelburg, Netherlands	W25	Clay	(Germany) Julia Wachaczyk	(Netherlands) Quirine Lemoine (Netherlands) Eva Wacanno	3–6, 5–7
Win	10–7	Jul 2016	ITF Darmstadt, Germany	W25	Clay	(Russia) Anna Kalinskaya	(Bosnia and Herzegovina) Anita Husarić (Slovenia) Dalila Jakupović	6–4, 6–1
Win	11–7	Aug 2016	ITF Westende, Belgium	W25	Hard	(Belgium) Elyne Boeykens	(Netherlands) Quirine Lemoine (Netherlands) Eva Wacanno	6–2, 6–3
Win	12–7	Sep 2016	ITF Sofia, Bulgaria	W25	Clay	(Netherlands) Quirine Lemoine	(North Macedonia) Lina Gjorcheska (Bulgaria) Viktoriya Tomova	6–4, 4–6, [10–6]
Loss	12–8	Oct 2016	Lagos Open, Nigeria	W25	Hard	(India) Prarthana Thombare	(Netherlands) Chayenne Ewijk (Netherlands) Rosalie van der Hoek	3–6, 5–7
Win	13–8	Oct 2016	Lagos Open, Nigeria	W25	Hard	(India) Prarthana Thombare	(India) Kyra Shroff (India) Dhruthi Tatachar Venugopal	6–7^{(3)}, 6–3, [11–9]
Win	14–8	Jul 2017	ITF Middelburg, Netherlands	W25	Clay	(Netherlands) Bibiane Schoofs	(Australia) Naiktha Bains (United States) Dasha Ivanova	6–7^{(8)}, 7–5, [10–5]
Loss	14–9	Sep 2017	ITF Sofia, Bulgaria	W25	Clay	(Romania) Elena-Gabriela Ruse	(Romania) Jaqueline Cristian (Russia) Anastasiya Komardina	3–6, 0–6
Loss	14–10	Nov 2017	ITF Dakar, Senegal	W25	Hard	(Netherlands) Rosalie van der Hoek	(Russia) Yana Sizikova (Montenegro) Ana Veselinović	3–6, 3–6
Win	15–10	Feb 2018	GB Pro-Series Glasgow, United Kingdom	W25	Hard (i)	(Belgium) Ysaline Bonaventure	(Hungary) Dalma Gálfi (Poland) Katarzyna Piter	7–5, 6–4
Loss	15–11	Feb 2018	AK Ladies Open, Germany	W25	Carpet (i)	(Belgium) Maryna Zanevska	(Latvia) Diāna Marcinkēviča (Poland) Katarzyna Piter	w/o
Win	16–11	Aug 2018	ITF Woking, UK	W25	Hard	(Hungary) Dalma Gálfi	(United Kingdom) Emily Arbuthnott (Kazakhstan) Anna Danilina	6–0, 4–6, [11–9]
Loss	16–12	Sep 2018	Open de Valencia, Spain	W60	Clay	(Mexico) Renata Zarazúa	(Russia) Irina Khromacheva (Serbia) Nina Stojanović	1–6, 4–6
Win	17–12	Jul 2019	ITF The Hague, Netherlands	W25	Clay	(Netherlands) Quirine Lemoine	(Australia) Gabriella Da Silva-Fick (Germany) Anna Klasen	6–2, 5–7, [10–3]
Win	18–12	Aug 2019	ITF Chiswick, UK	W25	Hard	(United Kingdom) Sarah Beth Grey	(United Kingdom) Freya Christie (United Kingdom) Samantha Murray	6–7^{(6)}, 6–3, [10–5]
Loss	18–13	Sep 2019	ITF Trieste, Italy	W25	Clay	(Hungary) Dalma Gálfi	(Romania) Cristina Dinu (Italy) Angelica Moratelli	6–4, 1–6, [8–10]
Loss	18–14	Oct 2019	Classic of Macon, United States	W80	Hard	(Australia) Jaimee Fourlis	(United States) Usue Maitane Arconada (United States) Caroline Dolehide	6–7^{(5)}, 4–6
Loss	18–15	Feb 2020	ITF Moscow, Russia	W25	Hard (i)	(Russia) Natela Dzalamidze	(Russia) Sofya Lansere (Russia) Kamilla Rakhimova	1–6, 6–3, [6–10]
Loss	18–16	Sep 2020	Zagreb Ladies Open, Croatia	W25	Clay	(Mexico) Ana Sofía Sánchez	(Croatia) Silvia Njirić (Serbia) Dejana Radanović	6–4, 5–7, [8–10]
Win	19–16	Feb 2021	ITF Moscow, Russia	W25	Hard (i)	(Russia) Anastasia Zakharova	(Russia) Ekaterina Kazionova (Belarus) Shalimar Talbi	6–3, 5–7, [10–8]
Loss	19–17	Mar 2021	ITF Kazan, Russia	W25	Hard (i)	(Russia) Anastasia Zakharova	(Norway) Ulrikke Eikeri (Belarus) Shalimar Talbi	4–6, 0–6
Loss	19–18	Mar 2021	ITF Buenos Aires, Argentina	W25	Clay	(Netherlands) Richèl Hogenkamp	(Russia) Amina Anshba (Hungary) Panna Udvardy	5–7, 2–6
Win	20–18	Mar 2021	ITF Villa María, Argentina	W25	Clay	(Netherlands) Richèl Hogenkamp	(Argentina) Victoria Bosio (Argentina) María Lourdes Carlé	6–2, 6–2
Loss	20–19	May 2021	Liepāja Open, Latvia	W25	Clay	(Belarus) Shalimar Talbi	(Uzbekistan) Akgul Amanmuradova (Russia) Valentina Ivakhnenko	3–6, 6–3, [11–13]
Win	21–19	Jun 2021	ITF Montemor-o-Novo, Portugal	W25	Hard	(Norway) Ulrikke Eikeri	(Japan) Eri Hozumi (Japan) Akiko Omae	6–1, 6–0
Win	22–19	Jun 2021	Macha Lake Open, Czech Republic	W60	Clay	(Netherlands) Richèl Hogenkamp	(Russia) Amina Anshba (Czech Republic) Anastasia Dețiuc	6–3, 6–4
Loss	22–20	Aug 2021	ITF Koksijde, Belgium	W25	Clay	(Russia) Valentina Ivakhnenko	(North Macedonia) Lina Gjorcheska (Ukraine) Valeriya Strakhova	4–6, 4–6
Win	23–20	Feb 2022	Porto Indoor, Portugal	W25	Hard (i)	(Netherlands) Quirine Lemoine	(France) Audrey Albié (France) Léolia Jeanjean	6–2, 6–3
Win	24–20	Feb 2022	Porto Indoor 2, Portugal	W25	Hard (i)	(Netherlands) Quirine Lemoine	(Hungary) Adrienn Nagy (India) Prarthana Thombare	6–2, 6–0
Loss	24–21	Apr 2022	Charlottesville Open, US	W60	Clay	(United States) Alycia Parks	(United States) Sophie Chang (United States) Angela Kulikov	6–2, 3–6, [4–10]
Loss	24–22	May 2022	Open Saint-Gaudens, France	W60	Clay	(Russia) Anastasia Tikhonova	(Mexico) Fernanda Contreras Gómez (Switzerland) Lulu Sun	5–7, 2–6
Win	25–22	Nov 2022	Meitar Open, Israel	W60	Hard	(Russia) Ekaterina Yashina	(Russia) Anna Kubareva (Russia) Maria Timofeeva	6–3, 7–5
Loss	25–23	Mar 2023	Bangalore Open, India	W40	Hard	(United Kingdom) Eden Silva	(Portugal) Francisca Jorge (Portugal) Matilde Jorge	7–5, 0–6, [3–10]
Win	26–23	Apr 2023	ITF Santa Margherita di Pula, Italy	W25	Clay	(Poland) Weronika Falkowska	(Italy) Angelica Moratelli (Netherlands) Arantxa Rus	6–1, 6–1
Win	27–23	May 2023	Zagreb Ladies Open, Croatia	W60	Clay	(Slovenia) Dalila Jakupović	(France) Carole Monnet (Croatia) Antonia Ružić	6–2, 7–5
Win	28–23	Jun 2023	ITF Kursumlijska Banja, Serbia	W25	Clay	(Russia) Sofya Lansere	(Argentina) Jazmin Ortenzi (Russia) Ekaterina Reyngold	6–3, 6–2
Win	29–23	Nov 2023	Open de Valencia, Spain	W100	Clay	(Romania) Andreea Mitu	(Spain) Aliona Bolsova (Georgia (country)) Natela Dzalamidze	7–5, 6–4
Loss	29–24	Feb 2024	ITF Helsinki, Finland	W35	Hard (i)	(Poland) Martyna Kubka	(Finland) Laura Hietaranta (Czech Republic) Linda Klimovičová	3–6, 1–6
Win	30–24	Apr 2024	Split Open, Croatia	W75	Clay	(India) Prarthana Thombare	(Slovenia) Veronika Erjavec (Lithuania) Justina Mikulskytė	6–4, 6–1
Loss	30–25	Apr 2024	Bonita Springs Championship, US	W100	Clay	(Ukraine) Valeriya Strakhova	(Hungary) Fanny Stollár (New Zealand) Lulu Sun	4–6, 5–7
Win	31–25	Jun 2024	Olomouc Open, Czech Republic	W75	Clay	(Russia) Amina Anshba	(United States) Jessie Aney (Germany) Lena Papadakis	6–2, 6–4
Win	32–25	Oct 2024	ITF Loughborough, UK	W35	Hard (i)	(Estonia) Elena Malõgina	(United Kingdom) Ella McDonald (United Kingdom) Ranah Stoiber	w/o
Win	33–25	Nov 2024	ITF Solarino, Italy	W35	Carpet	(Slovakia) Katarína Kužmová	(Russia) Ksenia Laskutova (Italy) Federica Urgesi	6–3, 6–3
Loss	33–26	Mar 2025	ITF Solarino, Italy	W35	Carpet	Yuliya Hatouka	(United States) Paris Corley (Poland) Weronika Falkowska	1–6, 1–6
Win	34–26	Jul 2025	ITF Turin, Italy	W35	Clay	(Sweden) Lisa Zaar	(Italy) Noemi Basiletti (Italy) Federica Urgesi	6–3, 7–6^{(3)}
Win	35–26	Sep 2025	ITF Santa Margherita di Pula, Italy	W35	Clay	(Germany) Antonia Schmidt	(Italy) Alessandra Mazzola (Czech Republic) Julie Štruplová	7–6^{(5)}, 3–6, [10–7]
Loss	35–27	Nov 2025	ITF Sharm El Sheikh, Egypt	W15	Hard	(Czech Republic) Amelie Justine Hejtmanek	Daria Khomutsianskaya; Anna Kubareva	6–7^{(2)}, 5–7
Loss	35–28	Aug 2026	ITF Verbier, Switzerland	W35	Clay	(Ukraine) Valeriya Strakhova	(France) Tiphanie Lemaître (Kenya) Angella Okutoyi	4–6, 7–6^{(3)}, [5–10]
Win	36–28	Oct 2026	ITF Marsa, Malta	W35	Hard	(United Kingdom) Esther Adeshina	(Italy) Federica Urgesi (Italy) Vittoria Paganetti	6–1, 6–3
Win	37–28	Nov 2026	ITF Heraklion, Greece	W50	Clay	(Greece) Martha Matoula	(United Kingdom) Victoria Allen (Czech Republic) Michaela Bayerlová	6–0, 6–3
