= Martha Matoula =

Greek tennis player (born 1997)

Martha Matoula Μάρθα Ματούλα
- Country (sports): Greece
- Born: 26 April 1997 (age 29) Thessaloniki, Greece
- Height: 1.70 m (5 ft 7 in)
- Plays: Right (two-handed backhand)
- College: University of Tulsa
- Prize money: $129,503

Singles
- Career record: 240–181
- Career titles: 2 ITF
- Highest ranking: No. 267 (19 October 2026)
- Current ranking: No. 267 (19 October 2026)

Doubles
- Career record: 113–107
- Career titles: 5 ITF
- Highest ranking: No. 220 (8 June 2026)
- Current ranking: No. 280 (19 October 2026)

Team competitions
- Fed Cup: 9–6
- Last updated on: 25 October 2026.

Martha Matoula
Medal record

Women's tennis

Representing Greece

Mediterranean Games
Gold medal – first place	2026 Taranto	Doubles
Silver medal – second place	2026 Taranto	Singles

Martha Matoula (Greek: Μάρθα Ματούλα; born 26 April 1997) is a Greek professional tennis player.

== Career ==
Matoula has a career-high singles ranking by the WTA of 267, achieved on 19 October 2026. She also has a career-high WTA doubles ranking of 220, achieved on 8 June 2026. She has won two titles in singles and five in doubles on the ITF Women's World Tennis Tour.

Matoula has competed for Greece in the Billie Jean King Cup.

She attended college at the University of Tulsa (2015–2019) and graduated with a bachelor's degree of accounting.

Matoula made her WTA Tour main-draw debut as a qualifier at the 2023 Transylvania Open, losing in the first round to Patricia Maria Țig in a three-set match lasting more than three hours.

== ITF Circuit finals ==
=== Singles: 12 (2 titles, 10 runner-ups) ===
Legend W50 tournaments W25/35 tournaments W15 tournaments	Finals by surface Hard (0–2) Clay (2–8)

Result	W–L	Date	Tournament	Tier	Surface	Opponent	Score
Loss	0–1	Oct 2021	ITF Sozopol, Bulgaria	W15	Hard	(Slovenia) Nastja Kolar	5–7, 6–3, 1–6
Win	1–1	Nov 2021	ITF Heraklion, Greece	W15	Clay	(Germany) Julia Kimmelmann	6–0, 7–5
Loss	1–2	May 2022	ITF Heraklion, Greece	W15	Clay	(Serbia) Lola Radivojević	3–6, 3–6
Loss	1–3	Aug 2022	ITF Erwitte, Germany	W15	Clay	(Germany) Julia Middendorf	6–3, 3–6, 4–6
Win	2–3	Jun 2023	ITF Kuršumlijska Banja, Serbia	W25	Clay	(Romania) Anca Todoni	6–2, 7–6^{(2)}
Loss	2–4	Jul 2023	ITF Getxo, Spain	W25	Clay	(Australia) Seone Mendez	2–6, 4–6
Loss	2–5	Jan 2025	ITF Monastir, Tunisia	W15	Hard	(Japan) Hiromi Abe	0–6, 0–6
Loss	2–6	May 2025	ITF Kuršumlijska Banja, Serbia	W35	Clay	(North Macedonia) Lina Gjorcheska	6–2, 0–6, 4–6
Loss	2–7	Nov 2025	ITF Orlando, United States	W35	Clay	(Hungary) Luca Udvardy	3–6, 3–6
Loss	2–8	Mar 2026	ITF Sabadell, Spain	W35	Clay	(Ukraine) Katarina Zavatska	3–6, 0–6
Loss	2–9	Jun 2026	ITF Haskovo, Bulgaria	W50	Clay	(France) Séléna Janicijevic	3–6, 6–2, 0–6
Loss	2–10	Nov 2026	ITF Heraklion, Greece	W50	Clay	(Cyprus) Raluca Șerban	6–3, 3–6, 4–6

=== Doubles: 19 (5 titles, 14 runner-ups) ===
Legend W75 tournaments W50 tournaments W25/35 tournaments W15 tournaments	Finals by surface Hard (0–2) Clay (5–11) Carpet (0–1)

Result	W–L	Date	Tournament	Tier	Surface	Partner	Opponents	Score
Win	1–0	Nov 2021	ITF Heraklion, Greece	W15	Clay	(Greece) Eleni Christofi	(Romania) Ilinca Amariei (Romania) Simona Ogescu	6–3, 6–2
Loss	1–1	Mar 2022	ITF Sharm El Sheikh, Egypt	W15	Hard	(Romania) Karola Bejenaru	(Hong Kong) Eudice Chong (Hong Kong) Cody Wong	3–6, 3–6
Loss	1–2	Jun 2022	ITF Annenheim, Austria	W25	Clay	(Romania) Arina Vasilescu	(United States) Jessie Aney (Germany) Lena Papadakis	6–1, 3–6, [9–11]
Loss	1–3	Aug 2022	ITF Erwitte, Germany	W15	Clay	(Romania) Arina Vasilescu	(Japan) Lisa-Marie Rioux (United States) Chiara Scholl	7–6^{(5)}, 1–6, [7–10]
Win	2–3	Mar 2023	ITF Amiens, France	W15	Clay (i)	(Romania) Arina Vasilescu	(France) Yaroslava Bartashevich (France) Diana Martynov	6–2, 7–5
Loss	2–4	Mar 2023	ITF Antalya, Turkiye	W15	Clay	(Sweden) Jacqueline Cabaj Awad	(Kazakhstan) Zhibek Kulambayeva; Daria Lodikova	1–6, 4–6
Loss	2–5	May 2023	ITF Tossa de Mar, Spain	W25+H	Carpet	(Romania) Arina Vasilescu	(Switzerland) Conny Perrin (Spain) Georgina Garcia-Perez	6–4, 3–6, [7–10]
Loss	2–6	Feb 2024	ITF Antalya, Turkiye	W35	Clay	(Greece) Dimitra Pavlou	(Spain) Ángela Fita Boluda (Latvia) Daniela Vismane	1–6, 3–6
Loss	2–7	Jul 2024	ITF Getxo, Spain	W35	Clay (i)	(Australia) Seone Mendez	(United States) Anna Rogers (United States) Alana Smith	0–6, 6–7^{(7)}
Loss	2–8	Oct 2024	ITF Seville, Spain	W35	Clay	(Spain) Aliona Bolsova	(Spain) Ángela Fita Boluda (Switzerland) Ylena In-Albon	2–6, 1–6
Loss	2–9	Feb 2025	ITF Monastir, Tunisia	W15	Hard	(United States) Sara Daavettila	(China) Guo Meiqi (China) Xiao Zhenghua	6–4, 6–7^{(5)}, [8–10]
Loss	2–10	Jun 2025	Zagreb Ladies Open, Croatia	W75	Clay	Arina Bulatova	(China) Feng Shuo (Japan) Aoi Ito	5–7, 3–6
Win	3–10	Jun 2025	ITF Stuttgart-Vaihingen, Germany	W35	Clay	(Czech Republic) Radka Zelníčková	(Switzerland) Chelsea Fontenel; Alevtina Ibragimova	7–6^{(5)}, 7–5
Loss	3–11	Aug 2025	ITF Kuršumlijska Banja, Serbia	W35	Clay	(Germany) Katharina Hobgarski	Alexandra Shubladze; Ksenia Zaytseva	2–6, 1–6
Loss	3–12	Sep 2025	ITF Kuršumlijska Banja	W75	Clay	(Czech Republic) Michaela Bayerlová	(Poland) Weronika Falkowska (Czech Republic) Anna Sisková	0–6, 5–7
Win	4–12	Oct 2025	ITF Heraklion, Greece	W50	Clay	Ksenia Zaytseva	Elina Nepliy (United States) Hibah Shaikh	7–6^{(5)}, 6–0
Loss	4–13	Oct 2025	ITF Heraklion, Greece	W35	Clay	(Greece) Elena Korokozidi	(Serbia) Natalija Senić (Netherlands) Antonia Stoyanov	4–6, 2–6
Win	5–13	Oct 2025	ITF Santa Margherita di Pula, Italy	W35	Clay	(Sweden) Lisa Zaar	(Serbia) Anja Stanković (Switzerland) Katerina Tsygourova	6–1, 4–6, [13–11]
Loss	5–14	Jun 2026	ITF Haskovo, Bulgaria	W50	Clay	(United States) Hibah Shaikh	(Kazakhstan) Zhibek Kulambayeva (Ukraine) Valeriya Strakhova	0–6, 4–6
