= Zagreb Ladies Open =

- 2026 Zagreb Ladies Open

ITF Women's Tour
- Event name: Zagreb Ladies Open
- Location: Zagreb, Croatia
- Venue: Tenis Centar Maksimir
- Category: ITF Women's Circuit
- Surface: Clay
- Draw: 32S/32Q/16D
- Prize money: $100,000

The Zagreb Ladies Open is a tournament for professional female tennis players played on outdoor clay courts. It is classified as a $60,000 ITF Women's Circuit event and has been held in Zagreb, Croatia, since 2005. The tournament returned in 2018, having not being held since 2011.

== Past finals ==
=== Singles ===
Year	Champion	Runner-up	Score
2026	(Armenia) Elina Avanesyan	(Sweden) Kajsa Persson	6–1, 6–3
2025	(Czech Republic) Dominika Šalková	(Croatia) Tara Würth	2–6, 6–3, 6–3
2024	(Croatia) Tara Würth	(Serbia) Lola Radivojević	7–5, 6–3
2023	(Romania) Jaqueline Cristian	(Germany) Ella Seidel	6–1, 3–6, 7–6^{(7–0)}
2022	(Germany) Jule Niemeier	(Hungary) Réka Luca Jani	6–2, 6–2
2021	(Ukraine) Anhelina Kalinina	(Russia) Kamilla Rakhimova	6–1, 6–3
2020	(Croatia) Ana Konjuh	(Croatia) Tereza Mrdeža	6–4, 6–2
2019	(Ukraine) Maryna Chernyshova	(Hungary) Réka Luca Jani	6–1, 6–4
2018	(Croatia) Tereza Mrdeža	(Argentina) Paula Ormaechea	2–6, 6–4, 7–5
2012–17	not held		
2011	(Bulgaria) Dia Evtimova	(Russia) Anastasia Pivovarova	6–2, 6–2
2010	(Czech Republic) Renata Voráčová	(Poland) Magda Linette	6–1, 4–6, 6–4
2009	(Czech Republic) Sandra Záhlavová	(Latvia) Anastasija Sevastova	6–1, 7–6^{(7–4)}
2008	(Croatia) Petra Martić	(Austria) Yvonne Meusburger	6–2, 2–6, 6–2
2007	(Hungary) Kira Nagy (2)	(Croatia) Ivana Lisjak	2–6, 7–6^{(7–3)}, 6–2
2006	(Hungary) Kira Nagy	(Italy) Tathiana Garbin	7–6^{(7–5)}, 3–6, 7–6^{(7–1)}
2005	(Czech Republic) Zuzana Ondrášková	(Bulgaria) Tsvetana Pironkova	4–6, 6–4, 6–3

=== Doubles ===
Year	Champions	Runners-up	Score
2026	(Croatia) Lucija Ćirić Bagarić (Italy) Angelica Moratelli	(Bulgaria) Rositsa Dencheva; Ekaterina Kazionova	7–5, 6–3
2025	(Japan) Aoi Ito (China) Feng Shuo	Arina Bulatova (Greece) Martha Matoula	7–5, 6–3
2024	(Switzerland) Céline Naef (Brazil) Laura Pigossi	(United Kingdom) Emily Appleton (India) Prarthana Thombare	4–6, 6–1, [10–8]
2023	(Greece) Valentini Grammatikopoulou (Slovenia) Dalila Jakupović	(France) Carole Monnet (Croatia) Antonia Ružić	6–2, 7–5
2022	(Czech Republic) Anastasia Dețiuc (Ukraine) Katarina Zavatska	(North Macedonia) Lina Gjorcheska; Irina Khromacheva	6–4, 6–7^{(5–7)}, [11–9]
2021	(Austria) Barbara Haas (Poland) Katarzyna Kawa	(Romania) Andreea Prisăcariu (Slovenia) Nika Radišić	7–6^{(7–1)}, 5–7, [10–6]
2020	(Croatia) Silvia Njirić (Serbia) Dejana Radanović	(Greece) Valentini Grammatikopoulou (Mexico) Ana Sofía Sánchez	4–6, 7–5, [10–8]
2019	(Hungary) Anna Bondár (Argentina) Paula Ormaechea	(France) Amandine Hesse (Chile) Daniela Seguel	7–5, 7–5
2018	(Venezuela) Andrea Gámiz (Venezuela) Aymet Uzcátegui	(Romania) Elena Bogdan (Romania) Alexandra Cadanțu	6–3, 6–4
2012–17	not held		
2011	(Portugal) Maria João Koehler (Hungary) Katalin Marosi	(Croatia) Maria Abramović (Romania) Mihaela Buzărnescu	6–0, 6–3
2010	(Argentina) Mailen Auroux (Serbia) Nataša Zorić	(Croatia) Ani Mijačika (Croatia) Ana Vrljić	7–5, 5–7, [14–12]
2009	(Croatia) Darija Jurak (Czech Republic) Renata Voráčová	(Russia) Elena Chalova (Russia) Anastasia Poltoratskaya	6–2, 7–5
2008	(Estonia) Maret Ani (Croatia) Jelena Kostanić Tošić	(Ukraine) Yuliya Beygelzimer (Switzerland) Stefanie Vögele	6–4, 6–2
2007	(Serbia) Karolina Jovanović (Russia) Anastasia Poltoratskaya	(Montenegro) Danica Krstajić (Serbia) Teodora Mirčić	0–6, 6–4, 6–1
2006	(Czech Republic) Michaela Paštiková (Czech Republic) Hana Šromová	(Czech Republic) Olga Blahotová (Czech Republic) Lucie Hradecká	4–6, 6–1, 6–2
2005	(Czech Republic) Lucie Hradecká (Czech Republic) Vladimíra Uhlířová	(Austria) Daniela Klemenschits (Austria) Sandra Klemenschits	6–2, 6–2
