= Ekaterina Makarova (tennis player, born 1996) =

Russian tennis player (born 1996)

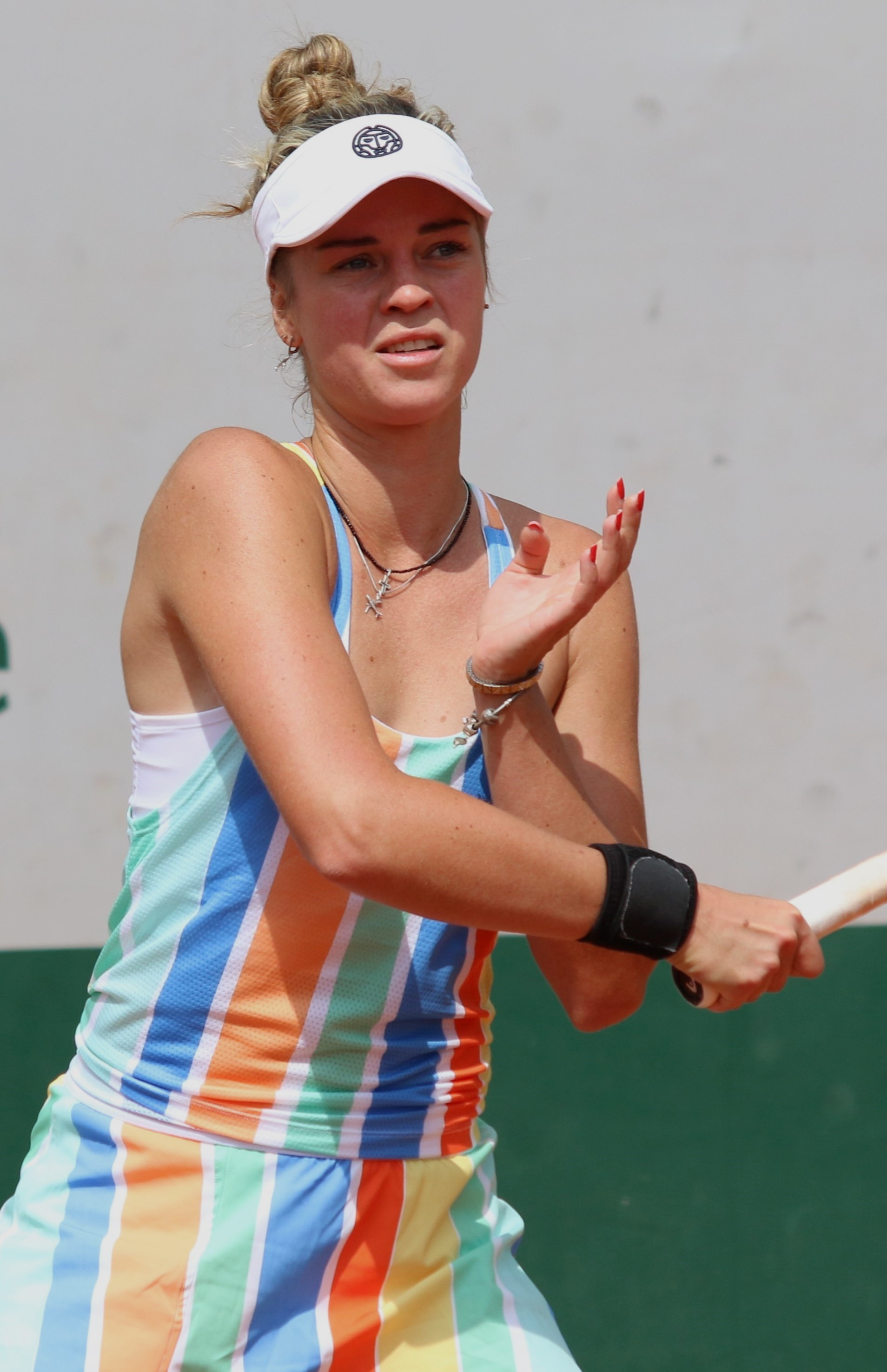
- Makarova at the 2023 French Open
- Full name: Ekaterina Vladimirovna Makarova
- Country (sports): Russia
- Born: 15 February 1996 (age 30)
- Plays: Right (two-handed backhand)
- Prize money: $449,789

Singles
- Career record: 260–212
- Career titles: 7 ITF
- Highest ranking: No. 158 (15 January 2024)

Grand Slam singles results
- Australian Open: Q2 (2025)
- French Open: Q1 (2023, 2024, 2025)
- Wimbledon: Q1 (2024, 2025)
- US Open: Q1 (2023, 2024)

Doubles
- Career record: 131–118
- Career titles: 12 ITF
- Highest ranking: No. 177 (30 January 2023)

Ekaterina Vladimirovna Makarova (Russian: Екатерина Владимировна Макарова; born 15 February 1996) is a Russian inactive tennis player.

Makarova has career-high WTA rankings of 158 in singles and 177 in doubles. Up to date, she has won seven singles and twelve doubles titles on the ITF Circuit.

In 2021, Makarova made her WTA Tour main-draw debut as a qualifier at the Luxembourg Open losing to Jana Fett in the first round.

== Grand Slam performance timeline ==
Key
W	F	SF	QF	#R	RR	Q#	DNQ	A	NH

(W) winner; (F) finalist; (SF) semifinalist; (QF) quarterfinalist; (#R) rounds 4, 3, 2, 1; (RR) round-robin stage; (Q#) qualification round; (DNQ) did not qualify; (A) absent; (NH) not held; (SR) strike rate (events won / competed); (W–L) win–loss record.
To avoid confusion and double counting, these charts are updated at the conclusion of a tournament or when the player's participation has ended.

=== Singles ===
Tournament	2023	2024	2025	W–L
Australian Open	Q1	Q1	Q2	0–0
French Open	Q1	Q1	Q1	0–0
Wimbledon	A	Q1	Q1	0–0
US Open	Q1	Q1	A	0–0
Win–Loss	0–0	0–0	0–0	0–0

== ITF Circuit finals ==
=== Singles: 21 (7 titles, 14 runner-ups) ===
Legend W75 tournaments (0–1) W40 tournaments (0–2) W25/35 tournaments (4–7) W15 tournaments (3–4)	Finals by surface Hard (3–3) Clay (4–11)

Result	W–L	Date	Tournament	Tier	Surface	Opponent	Score
Loss	0–1	Aug 2018	ITF Moscow, Russia	15,000	Clay	(Russia) Valeriya Yushchenko	0–6, 0–6
Win	1–1	Nov 2018	ITF Stellenbosch, South Africa	15,000	Hard	(Russia) Anastasia Shaulskaya	6–4, 6–4
Win	2–1	Dec 2018	ITF Stellenbosch, South Africa	15,000	Hard	(United Kingdom) Alice Gillan	6–2, 6–2
Win	3–1	Dec 2018	ITF Stellenbosch, South Africa	15,000	Hard	(United Kingdom) Alice Gillan	6–4, 6–4
Loss	3–2	May 2019	ITF Varberg, Sweden	15,000	Clay	(Sweden) Marina Yudanov	3–6, 5–7
Win	4–2	Jul 2022	ITF Horb, Germany	W25	Clay	(Australia) Jaimee Fourlis	6–1, 6–0
Loss	4–3	Aug 2022	ITF Oldenzaal, Netherlands	W25	Clay	(Spain) Leyre Romero Gormaz	4–6, 6–7^{(2–7)}
Win	5–3	Nov 2022	ITF Heraklion, Greece	W25	Clay	(North Macedonia) Lina Gjorcheska	6–4, 5–7, 7–5
Loss	5–4	Apr 2023	ITF Pula, Italy	W25	Clay	(United Kingdom) Sonay Kartal	6–3, 2–6, 1–6
Loss	5–5	Jul 2023	ITF Punta Cana, Dominican Rep.	W25	Clay	(Argentina) Martina Capurro Taborda	6–4, 4–6, 4–6
Loss	5–6	Jul 2023	ITF Punta Cana, Dominican Rep.	W25	Clay	(Spain) Carlota Martínez Círez	3–6, 3–6
Win	6–6	Sep 2023	ITF Slobozia, Romania	W25	Clay	(Croatia) Lucija Ćirić Bagarić	5–7, 6–4, 7-5
Loss	6–7	Nov 2023	ITF Heraklion, Greece	W40	Clay	(Czech Republic) Brenda Fruhvirtová	1–6, 3–6
Loss	6–8	Dec 2023	ITF Solapur, India	W25	Hard	(India) Sahaja Yamalapalli	4–6, 3–6
Loss	6–9	Dec 2023	ITF Navi Mumbai, India	W40	Hard	(Japan) Moyuka Uchijima	4–6, 1–6
Loss	6–10	Mar 2024	ITF Campinas, Brazil	W15	Clay	(Romania) Oana Gavrilă	2–6, 6–3, 1–6
Loss	6–11	Aug 2024	Ladies Open Hechingen, Germany	W75	Clay	(Hungary) Anna Bondár	0–6, 2–6
Win	7–11	Oct 2024	ITF Heraklion, Greece	W35	Clay	(Romania) Cristina Dinu	4–6, 6–3, 6–3
Loss	7–12	Mar 2025	ITF Gurugram, India	W35	Hard	(Russia) Kristina Dmitruk	3–6, 2–6
Loss	7–13	Mar 2025	ITF Heraklion, Greece	W15	Clay	(Finland) Laura Hietaranta	4–6, 4–6
Loss	7–14	May 2025	ITF Santa Margherita di Pula, Italy	W35	Clay	(Ukraine) Oleksandra Oliynykova	4–6, 0–6

=== Doubles: 22 (12 titles, 10 runner-ups) ===
Legend W60 tournaments (1–0) W40/50 tournaments (2–2) W25/35 tournaments (7–4) W15 tournaments (2–4)	Finals by surface Hard (6–4) Clay (6–6)

Result	W–L	Date	Tournament	Tier	Surface	Partner	Opponents	Score
Loss	0–1	Dec 2018	ITF Stellenbosch, South Africa	15,000	Hard	(South Africa) Sari Stegmann	(Israel) Maya Tahan (Netherlands) Eva Vedder	0–6, 4–6
Loss	0–2	May 2019	ITF Varberg, Sweden	15,000	Clay	(Belarus) Sadafmoh Tolibova	(Sweden) Caijsa Hennemann (Sweden) Maria Petrovic	6–7^{(3)}, 3–6
Loss	0–3	Jul 2019	ITF Moscow, Russia	25,000	Clay	(Belarus) Ilona Kremen	(Russia) Amina Anshba (Czech Republic) Anastasia Dețiuc	2–6, 4–6
Loss	0–4	Aug 2019	ITF Moscow, Russia	15,000	Clay	(Belarus) Sviatlana Pirazhenka	(Russia) Elina Avanesyan (Russia) Taisya Pachkaleva	2–6, 5–7
Win	1–4	Apr 2021	ITF Shymkent, Kazakhstan	W15	Clay	(Russia) Anzhelika Isaeva	(Uzbekistan) Sabina Sharipova (Russia) Ekaterina Yashina	7–6^{(4)}, 6–3
Loss	1–5	May 2021	ITF Šibenik, Croatia	W15	Clay	(Russia) Darya Astakhova	(Croatia) Petra Marčinko (Hungary) Natália Szabanin	4–6, 3–6
Win	2–5	Jun 2021	ITF Vilnius, Lithuania	W15	Hard	(Russia) Anna Morgina	(Lithuania) Justina Mikulskytė (Lithuania) Akvilė Paražinskaitė	6–2, 3–6, [10–2]
Win	3–5	Aug 2021	Verbier Open, Switzerland	W25	Clay	(Russia) Erika Andreeva	(Latvia) Diāna Marcinkēviča (Russia) Maria Timofeeva	7–6^{(2)}, 6–1
Loss	3–6	Oct 2021	ITF Karaganda, Kazakhstan	W25	Hard (i)	(Russia) Ekaterina Kazionova	(Serbia) Tamara Čurović (Russia) Ekaterina Reyngold	6–2, 3–6, [7–10]
Win	4–6	Feb 2022	Nur-Sultan Challenger, Kazakhstan	W60	Hard (i)	(Czech Republic) Linda Nosková	(Czech Republic) Anna Sisková (Russia) Maria Timofeeva	6–2, 6–3
Win	5–6	Mar 2022	Nur-Sultan Challenger 2, Kazakhstan	W25	Hard (i)	(Latvia) Kamilla Bartone	(Czech Republic) Anna Sisková (Russia) Maria Timofeeva	1–6, 7–5, [10–8]
Win	6–6	Jul 2022	ITF Horb, Germany	W25	Clay	(Russia) Ekaterina Reyngold	(Australia) Jaimee Fourlis (Australia) Alana Parnaby	2–6, 6–4, [10–8]
Win	7–6	Nov 2022	Trnava Indoor, Slovakia	W25	Hard (i)	(France) Alice Robbe	(Slovakia) Katarína Kužmová (Czech Republic) Anna Sisková	6–3, 7–5
Loss	7–7	Nov 2022	ITF Saint-Étienne, France	W25	Hard (i)	(Russia) Ekaterina Kazionova	(Switzerland) Conny Perrin (United Kingdom) Eden Silva	4–6, 6–4, [6–10]
Win	8–7	Nov 2022	ITF Heraklion, Greece	W25	Clay	(Romania) Oana Gavrilă	(Bulgaria) Denislava Glushkova (Ukraine) Anastasiya Soboleva	6–1, 6–3
Loss	8–8	Jan 2023	ITF Bhopal, India	W40	Hard	(Russia) Ekaterina Reyngold	(Japan) Erina Hayashi (Japan) Saki Imamura	3–6, 6–7^{(3)}
Loss	8–9	Oct 2023	ITF Kuršumlijska Banja, Serbia	W40	Clay	(Russia) Anastasia Gasanova	(Australia) Astra Sharma (Ukraine) Valeriya Strakhova	1–6, 4–6
Win	9–9	Dec 2023	ITF Navi Mumbai, India	W40	Hard	(Latvia) Kamilla Bartone	(Japan) Funa Kozaki (Japan) Misaki Matsuda	6–3, 1–6, [10–7]
Loss	9–10	Jul 2024	Amstelveen Open, Netherlands	W35	Clay	(Russia) Victoria Kan	(Netherlands) Michaëlla Krajicek (Netherlands) Eva Vedder	w/o
Win	10–10	Aug 2024	ITF Oldenzaal, Netherlands	W50	Clay	(Russia) Polina Kudermetova	(United Kingdom) Freya Christie (Colombia) Yuliana Lizarazo	6–4, 1–6, [10–7]
Win	11–10	Oct 2024	ITF Heraklion, Greece	W35	Clay	(Belgium) Marie Benoît	(Brazil) Luiza Fullana (Greece) Michaela Laki	7–6^{(4)}, 6–1
Win	12–10	Mar 2025	ITF Gurugram, India	W35	Hard	(Russia) Ekaterina Reyngold	(Russia) Polina Iatcenko (Russia) Mariia Tkacheva	2–6, 6–4, [10–7]
