= Antonia Ružić =

Croatian tennis player (born 2003)

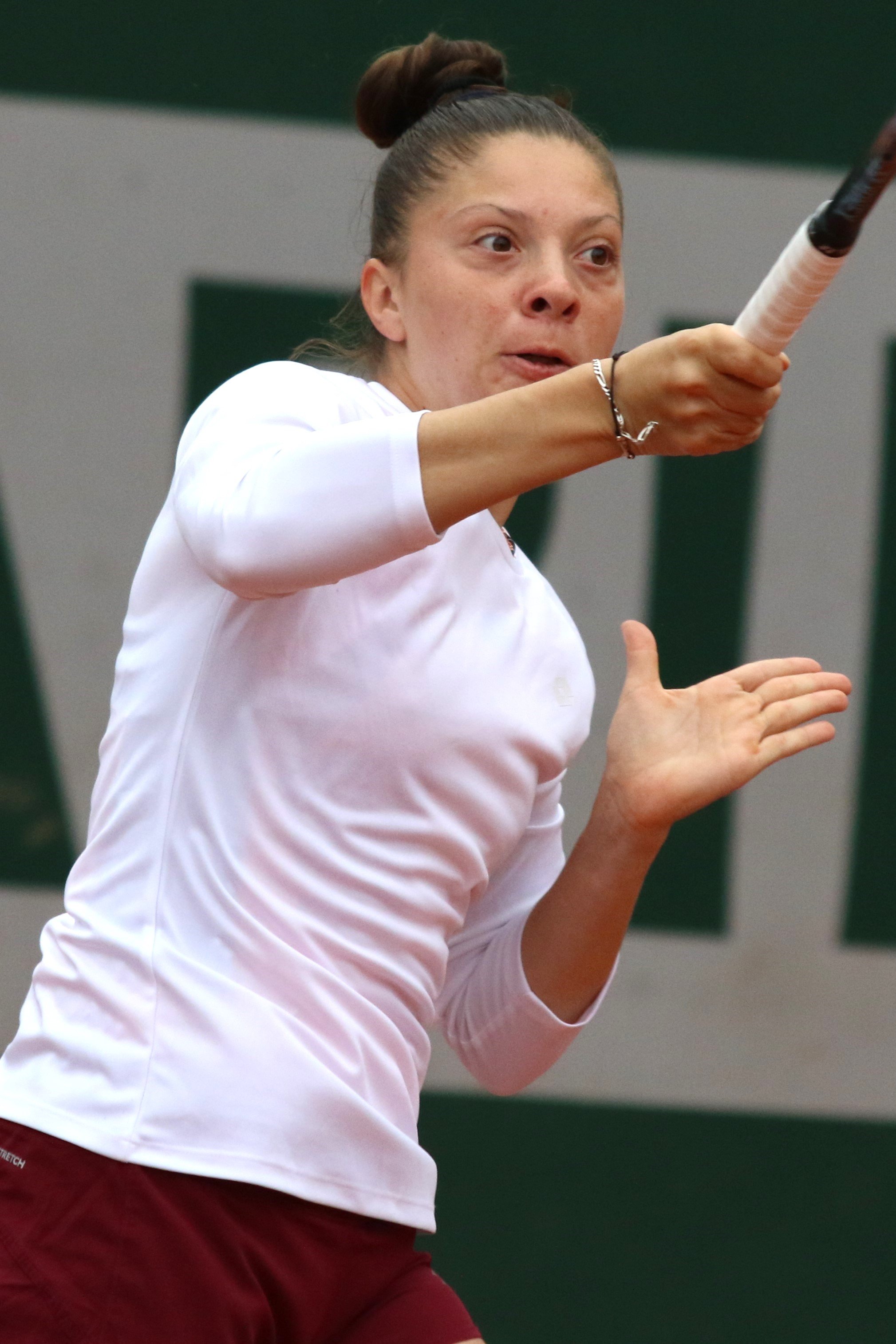
- Ružić at the 2023 French Open
- Country (sports): Croatia
- Born: 20 January 2003 (age 23) Orehovica, Croatia
- Height: 1.66 m (5 ft 5 in)
- Plays: Right (two-handed backhand)
- Coach: Juraj Dusparić
- Prize money: $1,652,802

Singles
- Career record: 229–126
- Career titles: 12 ITF
- Highest ranking: No. 50 (13 July 2026)
- Current ranking: No. 83 (28 September 2026)

Grand Slam singles results
- Australian Open: 1R (2026)
- French Open: 2R (2026)
- Wimbledon: 2R (2026)
- US Open: 1R (2025, 2026)

Doubles
- Career record: 15–29
- Career titles: 0
- Highest ranking: No. 544 (27 January 2025)
- Current ranking: No. 799 (28 September 2026)

Grand Slam doubles results
- Australian Open: 1R (2026)
- French Open: 1R (2026)
- Wimbledon: 1R (2026)
- US Open: 1R (2025)

Team competitions
- Fed Cup: 9–11
- Last updated on: 9 October 2026.

Antonia Ružić (born 20 January 2003) is a Croatian tennis player. Ružić has a career-high singles ranking of No. 50 by the WTA, achieved on 13 July 2026. She also has a career-high WTA doubles ranking of No. 544, reached in 2025. Ružić has won 12 singles titles on the ITF Women's Circuit.

Ružić is a member of the Croatia BJK Cup team, having made her Fed Cup debut in 2020.

== Career ==
=== 2024: WTA Tour debut and first quarterfinal ===
On her WTA Tour debut as a qualifier at the 2024 Jasmin Open in Monastir, Tunisia, Ružić reached the quarterfinals with wins over fourth seed Nadia Podoroska and Lily Miyazaki, before losing to seventh seed Lucia Bronzetti.

=== 2025: Major, top 100 and WTA 1000 debuts ===
Following the 2025 French Open, Ružić made her top 100 debut on 9 June 2025, at world No. 98.

Ružić reached her second WTA Tour quarterfinal at the WTA 500 2025 Monterrey Open, as a qualifier, with wins over eighth seed Anastasia Pavlyuchenkova and Elisabetta Cocciaretto before falling to Marie Bouzková.

Ružić made her major debut at the 2025 US Open, losing to Taylor Townsend in the first round. Ružić entered the main draw of the WTA 500 2025 Ningbo Open as a lucky loser but lost to Veronika Kudermetova.

=== 2026: WTA 1000 quarterfinal & top 10 win, top 60 ===
At the 2026 Dubai Tennis Championships, Ružić reached her first WTA 1000 quarterfinal, after entering the main draw as a lucky loser, and defeating Emma Raducanu, fellow lucky loser Anastasia Zakharova and reigning Australian Open champion and world No. 3, Elena Rybakina, her first top-10 win. She lost in the last eight to seventh seed Elina Svitolina in three sets. Despite the loss Ruzic reached a new career-high singles ranking of world No. 51 on 23 February 2026.

== Performance timeline ==
Key
W	F	SF	QF	#R	RR	Q#	DNQ	A	NH

(W) winner; (F) finalist; (SF) semifinalist; (QF) quarterfinalist; (#R) rounds 4, 3, 2, 1; (RR) round-robin stage; (Q#) qualification round; (DNQ) did not qualify; (A) absent; (NH) not held; (SR) strike rate (events won / competed); (W–L) win–loss record.
To avoid confusion and double counting, these charts are updated at the conclusion of a tournament or when the player's participation has ended.

=== Singles ===
Tournament	2023	2024	2025	2026	W–L
Grand Slam tournaments
Australian Open	A	A	Q1	1R	0–1
French Open	Q1	Q2	Q2	2R	1–1
Wimbledon	A	Q2	Q1	2R	1–1
US Open	A	Q1	1R	1R	0–2
Win–loss	0–0	0–0	0–1	2–4	2–5
WTA 1000 tournaments
Qatar Open	NTI	A	A	Q1	0–0
Dubai Championships	A	A	A	QF	3–1
Indian Wells Open	A	A	A	3R	2–1
Miami Open	A	A	A	1R	0–1
Madrid Open	A	A	Q2	1R	0–1
Italian Open	A	A	2R	2R	2–2
Canadian Open	A	A	2R	2R	2–2
Cincinnati Open	A	A	1R	1R	0–2
China Open	A	A	2R	A	1–1
Wuhan Open	NH	A	2R	A	1–1
Win–loss	0–0	0–0	4–5	7–7	11–12

== ITF Circuit finals ==
=== Singles: 15 (12 titles, 3 runner-ups) ===
Legend W/75 tournaments (2–0) W40/50 tournaments (4–2) W25 tournaments (5–1) W15 tournaments (1–0)	Finals by surface Hard (10–1) Clay (2–2)

Result	W–L	Date	Tournament	Tier	Surface	Opponent	Score
Win	1–0	Aug 2021	ITF Bad Waltersdorf, Austria	W15	Clay	(Slovenia) Živa Falkner	6–2, 6–2
Win	2–0	Oct 2021	ITF Lagos, Portugal	W25	Hard	(Bulgaria) Isabella Shinikova	6–1, 6–4
Win	3–0	Oct 2021	ITF Hamburg, Germany	W25	Hard (i)	(Hungary) Tímea Babos	6–2, 4–1 ret.
Loss	3–1	May 2022	ITF Osijek, Croatia	W25	Clay	(Czech Republic) Dominika Šalková	1–6, 2–6
Win	4–1	Jul 2022	ITF Darmstadt, Germany	W25	Clay	Irina Khromacheva	6–3, 6–2
Win	5–1	Aug 2022	ITF Vigo, Spain	W25	Hard	(United Kingdom) Anna Brogan	6–1, 6–1
Win	6–1	Mar 2023	ITF Říčany, Czech Republic	W40	Hard (i)	(Netherlands) Lesley Pattinama Kerkhove	6–4, 6–1
Loss	6–2	Sep 2023	ITF Kuršumlijska Banja, Serbia	W40	Clay	(North Macedonia) Lina Gjorcheska	3–6, 3–6
Win	7–2	Dec 2023	ITF Monastir, Tunisia	W25	Hard	(Turkey) Ayla Aksu	3–6, 6–4, 7–5
Win	8–2	Jan 2024	ITF Nonthaburi, Thailand	W50	Hard	(Japan) Sara Saito	6–1, 6–3
Loss	8–3	Jan 2024	ITF Nonthaburi, Thailand	W50	Hard	(Thailand) Mananchaya Sawangkaew	1–6, 6–2, 2–6
Win	9–3	Nov 2024	ITF Veracruz, Mexico	W50	Hard	Mariia Tkacheva	6–4, 7–6^{(3)}
Win	10–3	Nov 2024	Trnava Indoor, Slovakia	W50	Hard (i)	(Czech Republic) Tereza Valentová	6–3, 6–2
Win	11–3	Feb 2025	Trnava Indoor, Slovakia	W75	Hard (i)	Elena Pridankina	6–2, 4–6, 6–3
Win	12–3	Mar 2025	Branik Maribor Open, Slovenia	W75	Hard (i)	(Poland) Linda Klimovičová	6–1, 4–6, 6–3

=== Doubles: 3 (3 runner-ups) ===
Legend W60 tournaments (0–1)} W15 tournaments (0–2)	Finals by surface Clay (0–3)

Result	W–L	Date	Tournament	Tier	Surface	Partner	Opponents	Score
Loss	0–1	May 2019	ITF Tučepi, Croatia	W15	Clay	(Serbia) Tamara Malešević	(Bosnia and Herzegovina) Nefisa Berberović (Slovenia) Veronika Erjavec	2–6, 2–6
Loss	0–2	May 2021	ITF Antalya, Turkey	W15	Clay	(United Kingdom) Matilda Mutavdzic	(Italy) Federica Bilardo (Belarus) Kristina Dmitruk	3–6, 6–0, [7–10]
Loss	0–3	May 2023	Zagreb Ladies Open, Croatia	W60	Clay	(France) Carole Monnet	(Greece) Valentini Grammatikopoulou (Slovenia) Dalila Jakupović	2–6, 5–7

== Fed Cup participation ==
=== Singles (5–7) ===
Edition	Stage	Date	Location	Against	Surface	Opponent	W/L	Score
2023	Z1 R/R	10 Apr 2023	Antalya, Turkey	Denmark	Clay	Clara Tauson	L	6–7^{(6)}, 1–6
2023	Z1 R/R	12 Apr 2023	Antalya, Turkey	Serbia	Clay	Mia Ristić	L	4–6, 3–6
2023	Z1 R/R	14 Apr 2023	Antalya, Turkey	Norway	Clay	Ulrikke Eikeri	W	6–2, 6–4
2024	Z2 R/R	9 Apr 2024	Vilnius, Lithuania	Estonia	Hard (i)	Kaia Kanepi	W	6–4, 7–6^{(2)}
2024	Z2 R/R	10 Apr 2024	Vilnius, Lithuania	North Macedonia	Hard (i)	Lina Gjorcheska	W	5–7, 6–2, 6–2
2024	Z2 P/O	12 April 2024	Vilnius, Lithuania	Egypt	Hard (i)	Mayar Sherif	W	6–1, 6–1
2025	Z1 R/R	8 April 2025	Vilnius, Lithuania	Austria	Hard (i)	Julia Grabher	L	4–6, 0–6
2025	Z1 R/R	9 April 2025	Vilnius, Lithuania	Portugal	Hard (i)	Francisca Jorge	W	4–6, 6–1, 6–4
2025	Z1 R/R	10 April 2025	Vilnius, Lithuania	Latvia	Hard (i)	Darja Semeņistaja	L	3–6, 0–6
2025	Z1 P/O	12 April 2025	Vilnius, Lithuania	Serbia	Hard (i)	Mia Ristić	L	2–6, 6–4, 3–6
2025	P/O	15 November 2025	Varaždin, Croatia	Colombia	Hard (i)	Camila Osorio	L	1–6, 3–6
2025	P/O	16 November 2025	Varaždin, Croatia	Czech Republic	Hard (i)	Linda Nosková	L	5–7, 4–6

=== Doubles (2–3) ===
Edition	Stage	Date	Location	Against	Surface	Partner	Opponents	W/L	Score
2020	Z1 R/R	7 Feb 2020	Tallinn, Estonia	Ukraine	Hard (i)	Tara Würth	Marta Kostyuk; Katarina Zavatska	L	4–6, 3–6
2023	Z1 R/R	11 Apr 2023	Antalya, Turkey	Bulgaria	Clay	Lucija Ćirić Bagarić	Isabella Shinikova; Julia Terziyska	L	6–7^{(4)}, 6–4, 3–6
2023	Z1 R/R	13 Apr 2023	Antalya, Turkey	Sweden	Clay	Lucija Ćirić Bagarić	Jacqueline Cabaj Awad; Kajsa Rinaldo Persson	L	5–7, 5–7
2024	Z2 R/R	9 Apr 2024	Vilnius, Lithuania	Estonia	Hard (i)	Iva Primorac	Maileen Nuudi; Laura Rahnel	W	6–3, 4–6, [10–4]
2024	Z2 P/O	12 Apr 2024	Vilnius, Lithuania	Egypt	Hard (i)	Iva Primorac	Yassmin Ezat; Merna Refaat	W	6–1, 6–2

== Wins against top-10 players ==
- Ružić has a 1–1 record against players who were, at the time the match was played, ranked in the top 10.

No.	Player	Rk	Event	Surface	Rd	Score	Rk	Year	Ref
1	(Kazakhstan) Elena Rybakina	3	Dubai Championships, UAE	Hard	3R	5–7, 6–4, 1–0 ret.	67	2026	

- Key: (Rk) first use, opponent rank; (Rd) round; (Rk) 2nd use, player rank; (Ref) reference; (F) final; (SF) semifinal; (QF) quarterfinal; (#R) rounds 4, 3, 2, 1; (RR) round-robin stage; (Q#) qualifying rounds or stages (3), 2, 1.
