= Iva Primorac Pavičić =

Croatian tennis player (born 1996)

- Full name: Iva Primorac Pavičić
- Country (sports): Croatia
- Born: 10 April 1996 (age 30)
- Plays: Right-handed (two-handed backhand)
- Prize money: $95,450

Singles
- Career record: 315–223
- Career titles: 2 ITF
- Highest ranking: No. 377 (14 July 2025)
- Current ranking: No. 672 (25 May 2026)

Doubles
- Career record: 80–75
- Career titles: 5 ITF
- Highest ranking: No. 502 (23 November 2015)
- Current ranking: No. 719 (25 May 2026)

Team competitions
- Fed Cup: 5–1
- Last updated on: 25 May 2026.

Iva Primorac Pavičić (born 10 April 1996) is a Croatian tennis player.

Primorac Pavičić has a career-high singles ranking by the WTA of 377, achieved on 14 July 2025. She also has a career-high WTA doubles ranking of 502, reached on 23 November 2015. Primorac has won two singles and five doubles titles on the ITF Women's Circuit.

Primorac Pavičić made her debut for Croatia in the Billie Jean King Cup in April 2024 playing doubles in the Europe/Africa Zone. She has a win/loss record in BJK Cup of 5–1, as of May 2026.

== ITF Circuit finals ==
=== Singles: 12 (3 titles, 9 runner-ups) ===
Legend W40 tournaments (0–1) W25/35 tournaments (0–2) W10/15 tournaments (3–6)	Finals by surface Hard (2–0) Clay (1–9)

Result	W–L	Date	Tournament	Tier	Surface	Opponent	Score
Loss	0–1	Aug 2014	ITF Duino-Aurisina, Italy	10,000	Clay	(Italy) Bianca Turati	6–1, 1–6, 6–7^{(7)}
Loss	0–2	Aug 2015	ITF Innsbruck, Austria	10,000	Clay	(Italy) Jessica Pieri	6–4, 1–6, 3–6
Loss	0–3	Sep 2015	ITF Bol, Croatia	10,000	Clay	(Norway) Melanie Stokke	7–5, 3–6, 4–6
Win	1–3	Sep 2015	ITF Bol, Croatia	10,000	Clay	(Slovakia) Natália Vajdová	6–2, 6–2
Loss	1–4	Mar 2021	ITF Bratislava, Slovakia	W15	Clay	(Czech Republic) Linda Nosková	3–6, 6–7^{(4)}
Loss	1–5	Aug 2023	ITF Trieste, Italy	W25	Clay	(Italy) Sofia Rocchetti	6–7^{(5)}, 1–6
Loss	1–6	Sep 2023	ITF Skopje, North Macedonia	W40	Clay	(Serbia) Dejana Radanović	1–6, 3–6
Loss	1–7	Jul 2024	ITF Brežice, Slovenia	W15	Clay	(Brazil) Gabriela Cé	4–6, 4–6
Win	2–7	Feb 2026	ITF Leimen, Germany	W15	Hard (i)	(Netherlands) Stéphanie Visscher	6–2, 7–5
Loss	2–8	May 2026	ITF Reichstett, France	W15	Clay	(Germany) Valentina Steiner	3–6, 6–4, 0–6
Loss	2–9	May 2026	ITF Bol, Croatia	W35	Clay	(Poland) Weronika Falkowska	3–6, 2–6
Win	3–9	Nov 2026	ITF Paris, France	W15	Hard (i)	(Switzerland) Chelsea Fontenel	3–6, 6–2, 6–4

=== Doubles: 10 (5 titles, 5 runner-ups) ===
Legend W35 tournaments (0–1) $10/15,000 tournaments (5–4)	Finals by surface Hard (1–2) Clay (4–3)

Result	W–L	Date	Tournament	Tier	Surface	Partner	Opponents	Score
Loss	0–1	May 2015	ITF Bol, Croatia	10,000	Clay	(Switzerland) Karin Kennel	(North Macedonia) Lina Gjorcheska (Germany) Christina Shakovets	6–4, 2–6, [2–10]
Win	1–1	May 2015	ITF Bol, Croatia	10,000	Clay	(Croatia) Tena Lukas	(Brazil) Maria Fernanda Alves (Argentina) Ailen Crespo Azconzábal	4–6, 6–1, [10–7]
Loss	1–2	Aug 2015	ITF Pörtschach, Austria	10,000	Clay	(Austria) Janina Toljan	(Austria) Mira Antonitsch (Austria) Julia Grabher	2–6, 1–6
Loss	1–3	Sep 2015	ITF Bol, Croatia	10,000	Clay	(Switzerland) Karin Kennel	(Czech Republic) Lenka Kunčíková (Germany) Julia Wachaczyk	3–6, 6–4, [6–10]
Win	2–3	Nov 2015	ITF Antalya, Turkey	10,000	Clay	(North Macedonia) Lina Gjorcheska	(Ukraine) Gyulnara Nazarova (Russia) Aleksandra Pospelova	6–4, 6–3
Win	3–3	Nov 2015	ITF Antalya, Turkey	10,000	Clay	(North Macedonia) Lina Gjorcheska	(Ukraine) Alona Fomina (Germany) Christina Shakovets	6–4, 6–3
Win	4–3	Oct 2016	ITF Bol, Croatia	10,000	Clay	(Croatia) Tena Lukas	(Slovenia) Nina Potočnik (Hungary) Rebeka Stolmár	6–3, 6–4
Win	5–3	May 2018	ITF Sajur, Israel	15,000	Hard	(United States) Madeleine Kobelt	(Israel) Tamara Barad Itzhaki (Israel) Adva Dabah	6–3, 6–4
Loss	5–4	Mar 2021	ITF Bratislava, Slovakia	W15	Hard (i)	(Slovenia) Nina Potočnik	(Estonia) Elena Malõgina (France) Alice Robbe	6–7^{(2)}, 2–6
Loss	5–5	Oct 2024	ITF Istanbul, Turkey	W35	Hard (i)	(Sweden) Jacqueline Cabaj Awad	(Latvia) Kamilla Bartone (Romania) Andreea Prisăcariu	4–6, 2–6

== Billie Jean King Cup participation ==
=== Singles (1–0) ===
Edition	Stage	Date	Location	Against	Surface	Opponent	W/L	Score
2024	Z2 P/O	13 Apr 2024	Vilnius, Lithuania	Lithuania	Hard (i)	Patricija Paukstyte	W	6–1, 6–1

=== Doubles (4–1) ===
Edition	Stage	Date	Location	Against	Surface	Partner	Opponent	W/L	Score
2024	Z2 R/R	9 Apr 2024	Vilnius, Lithuania	Estonia	Hard (i)	Antonia Ružić	Maileen Nuudi; Laura Rahnel	W	6–3, 4–6, [10–4]
2024	Z2 R/R	10 Apr 2024	Vilnius, Lithuania	North Macedonia	Hard (i)	Lea Bošković	Iva Daneva; Ana Mitevska	W	6–0, 6–0
2024	Z2 P/O	12 Apr 2024	Vilnius, Lithuania	Egypt	Hard (i)	Antonia Ružić	Yassmin Ezat; Merna Refaat	W	6–1, 6–2
2025	Z1 R/R	9 April 2025	Vilnius, Lithuania	Portugal	Hard (i)	Tara Würth	Angelina Voloshchuk; Ines Murta	W	6–3, 6–1
2025	Z1 R/R	10 April 2025	Vilnius, Lithuania	Latvia	Hard (i)	Tara Würth	Beatrise Zeltiņa; Darja Semeņistaja	L	6–0, 3–6, [7–10]
