= Tara Würth =

Croatian tennis player (born 2002)

- Country (sports): Croatia
- Born: 30 September 2002 (age 24)
- Prize money: $335,910

Singles
- Career record: 192–103
- Career titles: 7 ITF
- Highest ranking: No. 145 (17 April 2023)
- Current ranking: No. 539 (28 September 2026)

Grand Slam singles results
- Australian Open: Q1 (2023, 2024, 2026)
- French Open: Q1 (2023, 2024)
- US Open: Q2 (2025)

Doubles
- Career record: 61–49
- Career titles: 2 WTA 125, 2 ITF
- Highest ranking: No. 128 (20 October 2025)
- Current ranking: No. 361 (28 September 2026)

Team competitions
- Fed Cup: 7–10
- Last updated on: 1 October 2026.

Tara Würth (born 30 September 2002) is a Croatian tennis player. She has a career-high singles ranking of world No. 145, achieved on 17 April 2023, and a career-high doubles ranking of world No. 128, achieved on 20 October 2025.

== Grand Slam performance timeline ==
Key
| W | F | SF | QF | #R | RR | Q# | DNQ | A | NH |

(W) winner; (F) finalist; (SF) semifinalist; (QF) quarterfinalist; (#R) rounds 4, 3, 2, 1; (RR) round-robin stage; (Q#) qualification round; (DNQ) did not qualify; (A) absent; (NH) not held; (SR) strike rate (events won / competed); (W–L) win–loss record.
To avoid confusion and double counting, these charts are updated at the conclusion of a tournament or when the player's participation has ended.

=== Singles ===
| Tournament | 2022 | 2023 | 2024 | 2025 | 2026 | W–L |
|---|---|---|---|---|---|---|
| Australian Open | A | Q1 | Q1 | A | Q1 | 0–0 |
| French Open | A | Q1 | Q1 | A | A | 0–0 |
| Wimbledon | A | A | A | A | A | 0–0 |
| US Open | Q1 | A | A | Q2 | A | 0–0 |
| Win–loss | 0–0 | 0–0 | 0–0 | 0–0 | 0–0 | 0–0 |

== WTA 125 finals ==
=== Doubles: 3 (2 titles, 1 runner-up) ===
| Result | W–L | Date | Tournament | Surface | Partner | Opponents | Score |
|---|---|---|---|---|---|---|---|
| Loss | 0–1 | Nov 2024 | Cali Open, Colombia | Clay | (Ukraine) Katarina Zavatska | (Slovenia) Veronika Erjavec (France) Kristina Mladenovic | 2–6, 6–7^{(4–7)} |
| Win | 1–1 | Sep 2025 | San Sebastián Open, Spain | Clay | Anastasia Tikhonova | (United States) Elvina Kalieva (Romania) Gabriela Lee | 6–3, 6–0 |
| Win | 2–1 | Oct 2025 | Rio Ladies Open, Brazil | Clay | (Spain) Leyre Romero Gormaz | (Spain) Irene Burillo (Georgia (country)) Ekaterine Gorgodze | 6–4, 6–1 |

== ITF Circuit finals ==
=== Singles: 13 (8 titles, 5 runner-ups) ===
| Legend W60/75 tournaments (3–1) W40/50 tournaments (1–1) W25/35 tournaments (3–2) W15 tournaments (1–1) | Finals by surface Hard (0–2) Clay (8–3) |

| Result | W–L | Date | Tournament | Tier | Surface | Opponent | Score |
|---|---|---|---|---|---|---|---|
| Loss | 0–1 | Feb 2020 | ITF Antalya, Turkey | W15 | Clay | (Romania) Georgia Crăciun | 6–2, 3–6, 3–6 |
| Win | 1–1 | Sep 2021 | ITF Trieste, Italy | W25 | Clay | (Sweden) Mirjam Björklund | 3–6, 6–4, 7–5 |
| Loss | 1–2 | Jun 2022 | ITF Prokuplje, Serbia | W25 | Clay | (Hungary) Natália Szabanin | 4–6, 6–7^{(5)} |
| Win | 2–2 | Jun 2022 | ITF Tarvisio, Italy | W25 | Clay | (Croatia) Lea Bošković | 7–5, 6–0 |
| Win | 3–2 | Jul 2022 | ATV Roma Open, Italy | W60 | Clay | (France) Chloé Paquet | 6–3, 6–4 |
| Loss | 3–3 | Oct 2022 | ITF Quinta do Lago, Portugal | W25 | Hard | (Spain) Jéssica Bouzas Maneiro | 5–7, 4–5 ret. |
| Loss | 3–4 | Feb 2023 | Porto Indoor, Portugal | W40 | Hard (i) | (Belgium) Greet Minnen | 2–6, 2–6 |
| Win | 4–4 | Apr 2023 | ITF Split, Croatia | W40 | Clay | (Czech Republic) Sára Bejlek | 6–2, 3–6, 6–4 |
| Win | 5–4 | May 2024 | Zagreb Ladies Open, Croatia | W75 | Clay | (Serbia) Lola Radivojević | 7–5, 6–3 |
| Win | 6–4 | May 2025 | Zagreb Open, Croatia | W75 | Clay | (Spain) Guiomar Maristany | 6–2, 4–6, 6–3 |
| Loss | 6–5 | Jun 2025 | Zagreb Ladies Open, Croatia | W75 | Clay | (Czech Republic) Dominika Šalková | 6–2, 3–6, 3–6 |
| Win | 7–5 | Apr 2026 | ITF Santa Margherita di Pula, Italy | W35 | Clay | (Germany) Joëlle Steur | 6–3, 2–6, 6–2 |
| Win | 8–5 | Oct 2026 | ITF Bol, Croatia | W15 | Clay | (Germany) Anna Petkovic | 6–4, 6–2 |

=== Doubles: 8 (2 titles, 6 runner-ups) ===
| Legend W60/75 tournaments (2–1) W40/50 tournaments (0–4) W25/35 tournaments (0–1) | Finals by surface Hard (1–3) Clay (1–3) |

| Result | W–L | Date | Tournament | Tier | Surface | Partner | Opponents | Score |
|---|---|---|---|---|---|---|---|---|
| Loss | 0–1 | Jun 2022 | ITF Prokuplje, Serbia | W25 | Clay | (Spain) Leyre Romero Gormaz | (Kazakhstan) Zhibek Kulambayeva (India) Prarthana Thombare | w/o |
| Loss | 0–2 | Jan 2023 | Porto Indoor, Portugal | W40 | Hard (i) | (France) Alice Robbe | (Switzerland) Céline Naef (Belgium) Yanina Wickmayer | 1–6, 4–6 |
| Loss | 0–3 | Feb 2023 | ITF Porto, Portugal | W40 | Hard (i) | (Portugal) Matilde Jorge | (Georgia (country)) Ekaterine Gorgodze (Spain) Leyre Romero Gormaz | 4–6, 6–2, [9–11] |
| Loss | 0–4 | Apr 2023 | ITF Split, Croatia | W40 | Clay | (Slovenia) Nika Radišić | (Slovenia) Veronika Erjavec (North Macedonia) Lina Gjorcheska | 1–6, 4–6 |
| Loss | 0–5 | Aug 2024 | ITF Kuršumlijska Banja, Serbia | W75 | Clay | (Slovenia) Živa Falkner | (Croatia) Petra Marčinko (Serbia) Lola Radivojević | 6–7^{(5)}, 4–6 |
| Loss | 0–6 | Nov 2024 | Trnava Indoor, Slovakia | W50 | Hard (i) | (Turkey) İpek Öz | (Czech Republic) Dominika Šalková (Czech Republic) Julie Štruplová | 4–6, 4–6 |
| Win | 1–6 | Mar 2025 | Murska Sobota Open, Slovenia | W75 | Hard (i) | (Croatia) Petra Marčinko | (Chinese Taipei) Cho I-hsuan (Chinese Taipei) Cho Yi-tsen | 6–3, 3–6, [10–4] |
| Win | 2–6 | May 2026 | Zagreb Open, Croatia | W75 | Clay | (Switzerland) Naïma Karamoko | (Romania) Briana Szabó (Latvia) Beatrise Zeltiņa | 3–6, 7–6^{(4)}, [10–5] |

== Fed Cup participation ==
=== Singles (1–3) ===
| Edition | Stage | Date | Location | Against | Surface | Opponent | W/L | Score |
|---|---|---|---|---|---|---|---|---|
| 2023 | Z1 R/R | 11 Apr 2023 | Antalya, Turkey | Bulgaria | Clay | Gergana Topalova | L | 4–6, 6–2, 3–6 |
| 2023 | Z1 R/R | 12 Apr 2023 | Antalya, Turkey | Serbia | Clay | Lola Radivojević | L | 2–6, 7–6^{(5)}, 5–7 |
| 2023 | Z1 R/R | 13 Apr 2023 | Antalya, Turkey | Sweden | Clay | Rebecca Peterson | L | 6–7^{(3)}, 6–7^{(5)} |
| 2023 | Z1 R/R | 14 Apr 2023 | Antalya, Turkey | Norway | Clay | Malene Helgø | W | 0–6, 6–3, 6–3 |

=== Doubles (4–5) ===
| Edition | Stage | Date | Location | Against | Surface | Partner | Opponents | W/L | Score |
|---|---|---|---|---|---|---|---|---|---|
| 2020 | Z1 R/R | 7 Feb 2020 | Tallinn, Estonia | Ukraine | Hard (i) | Antonia Ružić | Marta Kostyuk; Katarina Zavatska | L | 4–6, 3–6 |
| 2022 | Z1 R/R | 14 Apr 2022 | Antalya, Turkey | (Georgia (country)) Georgia | Clay | Ana Konjuh | Mariam Bolkvadze; Oksana Kalashnikova | W | 5–7, 7–6^{(2)}, ret. |
| 2022 | Z1 R/R | 15 Apr 2022 | Antalya, Turkey | Austria | Clay | Petra Marčinko | Barbara Haas; Melanie Klaffner | L | 7–5, ret. |
| 2023 | Z1 R/R | 10 Apr 2023 | Antalya, Turkey | Denmark | Clay | Petra Marčinko | Rebecca Mortensen; Johanne Svendsen | L | 3–6, 5–7 |
| 2023 | Z1 R/R | 12 Apr 2023 | Antalya, Turkey | Serbia | Clay | Lucija Ćirić Bagarić | Olga Danilović; Katarina Kozarov | L | 4–6, 1–6 |
| 2025 | Z1 R/R | 8 April 2025 | Vilnius, Lithuania | Austria | Hard (i) | Petra Marčinko | Ekaterina Perelygina; Julia Grabher | W | 6–3, 4–6, [10–7] |
| 2025 | Z1 R/R | 9 April 2025 | Vilnius, Lithuania | Portugal | Hard (i) | Iva Primorac | Angelina Voloshchuk; Ines Murta | W | 6–3, 6–1 |
| 2025 | Z1 R/R | 10 April 2025 | Vilnius, Lithuania | Latvia | Hard (i) | Iva Primorac | Beatrise Zeltiņa; Darja Semeņistaja | L | 6–0, 3–6, [7–10] |
| 2025 | Z1 P/O | 12 April 2025 | Vilnius, Lithuania | Serbia | Hard (i) | Petra Marčinko | Teodora Kostović; Natalija Senić | W | 6–1, 6–2 |
