= 2019 Internationaux Féminins de la Vienne =

- Date: 21–27 October 2019
- Edition: 26th
- Category: ITF Women's World Tennis Tour
- Prize money: $80,000
- Surface: Hard / Indoor
- Location: Poitiers, France

Champions

Singles
- (Serbia) Nina Stojanović

Doubles
- (France) Amandine Hesse / (France) Harmony Tan
← 2018 ·	Internationaux Féminins de la Vienne	· 2021 →

The 2019 Internationaux Féminins de la Vienne was a professional tennis tournament played on indoor hard courts. It was the twenty-sixth edition of the tournament which was part of the 2019 ITF Women's World Tennis Tour. It took place in Poitiers, France between 21 and 27 October 2019.

== Singles main-draw entrants ==
=== Seeds ===
Country	Player	Rank^{1}	Seed
SVK	Viktória Kužmová	52	1
GER	Tatjana Maria	86	2
RUS	Natalia Vikhlyantseva	93	3
SRB	Nina Stojanović	97	4
RUS	Vitalia Diatchenko	112	5
RUS	Varvara Gracheva	121	6
FRA	Pauline Parmentier	122	7
CZE	Tereza Martincová	128	8

- ^{1} Rankings are as of 14 October 2019.

=== Other entrants ===
The following players received wildcards into the singles main draw:

- (France) Lou Adler
- (France) Tatiana Golovin
- (France) Manon Léonard
- (France) Alice Tubello

The following players received entry from the qualifying draw:

- (France) Sara Cakarevic
- (Belgium) Magali Kempen
- (Belarus) Lidziya Marozava
- (Italy) Angelica Moratelli
- (Germany) Yana Morderger
- (Ukraine) Anastasiya Shoshyna
- (Italy) Lucrezia Stefanini
- (France) Margot Yerolymos

== Champions ==
=== Singles ===
- (Serbia) Nina Stojanović def. (Russia) Liudmila Samsonova, 6–2, 7–6^{(7–2)}

=== Doubles ===
- (France) Amandine Hesse / (France) Harmony Tan def. (Germany) Tayisiya Morderger / (Germany) Yana Morderger, 6–4, 6–2
