= 2017 Internationaux Féminins de la Vienne =

- Date: 23–29 October
- Edition: 21st
- Category: ITF Women's Circuit
- Prize money: $100,000
- Surface: Hard / Indoor
- Location: Poitiers, France

Champions

Singles
- (Romania) Mihaela Buzărnescu

Doubles
- (Switzerland) Belinda Bencic / (Belgium) Yanina Wickmayer
← 2016 ·	Internationaux Féminins de la Vienne	· 2018 →

The 2017 Internationaux Féminins de la Vienne was a professional tennis tournament played on indoor hard courts. It was the twenty-first edition of the tournament and was part of the 2017 ITF Women's Circuit. It took place in Poitiers, France, on 23–29 October 2017.

== Singles main draw entrants ==
=== Seeds ===
Country	Player	Rank^{1}	Seed
GER	Tatjana Maria	49	1
ROU	Monica Niculescu	66	2
RUS	Ekaterina Alexandrova	74	3
BEL	Alison Van Uytvanck	88	4
ROU	Mihaela Buzărnescu	89	5
CRO	Petra Martić	90	6
CRO	Jana Fett	98	7
FRA	Pauline Parmentier	101	8

- ^{1} Rankings as of 16 October 2017.

=== Other entrants ===
The following players received a wildcard into the singles main draw:

- (Switzerland) Belinda Bencic
- (France) Priscilla Heise
- (France) Chloé Paquet
- (Czech Republic) Tereza Smitková

The following player received entry using a protected ranking:

- (Romania) Alexandra Dulgheru

The following players received entry from the qualifying draw:

- (Liechtenstein) Kathinka von Deichmann
- (Serbia) Ivana Jorović
- (Georgia (country)) Sofia Shapatava
- (Ukraine) Katarina Zavatska

== Champions ==
=== Singles ===
- (Romania) Mihaela Buzărnescu def. (Belgium) Alison Van Uytvanck, 6–4, 6–2

=== Doubles ===
- (Switzerland) Belinda Bencic / (Belgium) Yanina Wickmayer def. (Romania) Mihaela Buzărnescu / (Germany) Nicola Geuer, 7–6^{(9–7)}, 6–3
