= 2019 Internationaux Féminins de la Vienne – Singles =

Singles
- 2019 Internationaux Féminins de la Vienne

Final
- Champion: (Serbia) Nina Stojanović
- Runner-up: (Russia) Liudmila Samsonova
- Score: 6–2, 7–6^{(7–2)}

Events
Singles	Doubles
← 2018 ·	Internationaux Féminins de la Vienne	· 2021 →

Viktorija Golubic was the defending champion, but chose not to participate.

Nina Stojanović won the title, defeating Liudmila Samsonova in the final, 6–2, 7–6^{(7–2)}.

== Seeds ==
1. (Slovakia) Viktória Kužmová (first round)
2. (Germany) Tatjana Maria (quarterfinals)
3. (Russia) Natalia Vikhlyantseva (quarterfinals)
4. (Serbia) Nina Stojanović (champion)
5. (Russia) Vitalia Diatchenko (semifinals)
6. (Russia) Varvara Gracheva (first round)
7. (France) Pauline Parmentier (first round)
8. (Czech Republic) Tereza Martincová (quarterfinals)

== Draw ==
=== Key ===
- Q = Qualifier
- WC = Wild card
- LL = Lucky loser
- Alt = Alternate
- SE = Special exempt
- PR = Protected ranking
- ITF = ITF entry
- JE = Junior exempt
- w/o = Walkover
- r = Retired
- d = Defaulted
- SR = Special ranking

=== Finals ===
Semifinals
5	(Russia) Vitalia Diatchenko	6	3	0
4	(Serbia) Nina Stojanović	3	6	6
(France) Océane Dodin	6^{5}	0
(Russia) Liudmila Samsonova	7^{7}	6

Final
4	(Serbia) Nina Stojanović	6	7^{7}
(Russia) Liudmila Samsonova	2	6^{2}

=== Top half ===
First round
1	(Slovakia) V Kužmová	6^{3}	1
(Russia) V Flink	7^{7}	6
WC	(France) L Adler	5	2
(Italy) G Gatto-Monticone	7	6
(France) A Hesse	7	6
Q	(Germany) Y Morderger	5	2
(France) A Albié	6	3	5
5	(Russia) V Diatchenko	4	6	7
4	(Serbia) N Stojanović	6	6
(Luxembourg) E Molinaro	4	4
Q	(France) S Cakarevic	7	6
(France) H Tan	5	3
Q	(Italy) A Moratelli	6	2	4
(Latvia) D Marcinkēviča	4	6	6
Q	(France) M Yerolymos	4	2
8	(Czech Republic) T Martincová	6	6

Second round
(Russia) V Flink	6	5	5
(Italy) G Gatto-Monticone	2	7	7
(France) A Hesse	5	5
5	(Russia) V Diatchenko	7	7
4	(Serbia) N Stojanović	6	7^{7}
Q	(France) S Cakarevic	4	6^{2}
(Latvia) D Marcinkēviča	1	6^{6}
8	(Czech Republic) T Martincová	6	7^{8}

Quarterfinals
(Italy) G Gatto-Monticone	6	4	1
5	(Russia) V Diatchenko	4	6	6
4	(Serbia) N Stojanović	6	6
8	(Czech Republic) T Martincová	3	3

Semifinals
5	(Russia) V Diatchenko	6	3	0
4	(Serbia) N Stojanović	3	6	6

=== Bottom half ===
First round
6	(Russia) V Gracheva	6	2	4
(France) O Dodin	3	6	6
Q	(Belgium) M Kempen	0^{r}
Q	(Ukraine) A Shoshyna	3
(France) M Georges	7	6
(Ukraine) M Kostyuk	5	4
WC	(France) M Léonard	2	0
3	(Russia) N Vikhlyantseva	6	6
7	(France) P Parmentier	4	5
(Russia) L Samsonova	6	7
WC	(France) T Golovin	0	1
(Germany) A Lottner	6	6
Q	(Belarus) L Marozava	3	5
WC	(France) A Tubello	6	7
Q	(Italy) L Stefanini	4	4
2	(Germany) T Maria	6	6

Second round
(France) O Dodin	7	6
Q	(Ukraine) A Shoshyna	5	1
(France) M Georges	4	3
3	(Russia) N Vikhlyantseva	6	6
(Russia) L Samsonova	6	6
(Germany) A Lottner	2	0
WC	(France) A Tubello	2	4
2	(Germany) T Maria	6	6

Quarterfinals
(France) O Dodin	7^{7}	6
3	(Russia) N Vikhlyantseva	6^{4}	2
(Russia) L Samsonova	6	6
2	(Germany) T Maria	4	4

Semifinals
(France) O Dodin	6^{5}	0
(Russia) L Samsonova	7^{7}	6
