= 2018 Internationaux Féminins de la Vienne =

- Date: 22–28 October
- Edition: 22nd
- Category: ITF Women's Circuit
- Prize money: $80,000
- Surface: Hard / Indoor
- Location: Poitiers, France

Champions

Singles
- (Switzerland) Viktorija Golubic

Doubles
- (Russia) Anna Blinkova / (Russia) Alexandra Panova
← 2017 ·	Internationaux Féminins de la Vienne	· 2019 →

The 2018 Internationaux Féminins de la Vienne was a professional tennis tournament played on indoor hard courts. It was the twenty-second edition of the tournament and was part of the 2018 ITF Women's Circuit. It took place in Poitiers, France, on 22–28 October 2018.

== Singles main draw entrants ==
=== Seeds ===
Country	Player	Rank^{1}	Seed
FRA	Pauline Parmentier	50	1
SVK	Viktória Kužmová	58	2
SVK	Anna Karolína Schmiedlová	68	3
GER	Tatjana Maria	75	4
SUI	Stefanie Vögele	81	5
ROU	Monica Niculescu	82	6
RUS	Evgeniya Rodina	85	7
RUS	Anna Blinkova	97	8

- ^{1} Rankings as of 15 October 2018.

=== Other entrants ===
The following players received a wildcard into the singles main draw:

- (France) Tessah Andrianjafitrimo
- (France) Amandine Hesse
- (Germany) Sabine Lisicki
- (France) Margot Yerolymos

The following players received entry from the qualifying draw:

- (France) Lou Adler
- (France) Priscilla Heise
- (Czech Republic) Jesika Malečková
- (Bulgaria) Julia Terziyska

== Champions ==
=== Singles ===
- (Switzerland) Viktorija Golubic def. (Russia) Natalia Vikhlyantseva, 3–6, 6–1, 7–5

=== Doubles ===
- (Russia) Anna Blinkova / (Russia) Alexandra Panova def. (Switzerland) Viktorija Golubic / (Netherlands) Arantxa Rus, 6–1, 6–1
