= 2017 Upper Austria Ladies Linz – Doubles =

Doubles
- 2017 Upper Austria Ladies Linz

Final
- Champions: (Netherlands) Kiki Bertens (Sweden) Johanna Larsson
- Runners-up: (Russia) Natela Dzalamidze (Switzerland) Xenia Knoll
- Score: 3–6, 6–3, [10–4]

Details
- Draw: 16
- Seeds: 4

Events
Singles	Doubles
- Linz Open

Kiki Bertens and Johanna Larsson were the defending champions and successfully retained their title, defeating Natela Dzalamidze and Xenia Knoll in the final, 3–6, 6–3, [10–4].

== Seeds ==
1. (Netherlands) Kiki Bertens / (Sweden) Johanna Larsson (champions)
2. (Poland) Alicja Rosolska / (United States) Abigail Spears (first round)
3. (Belgium) Kirsten Flipkens / (Netherlands) Demi Schuurs (quarterfinals)
4. (Ukraine) Nadiia Kichenok / (Australia) Anastasia Rodionova (quarterfinals)

== Draw ==
Key

- Q = Qualifier
- WC = Wild card
- LL = Lucky loser
- Alt = Alternate
- ITF = ITF entry
- PR = Protected ranking
- SR = Special ranking
- SE = Special exempt
- JE = Junior exempt
- JR = Junior Accelerator Programme entrant
- CO = College Accelerator Programme entrant
- NG = Next Gen Accelerator Program entrant
- w/o = Walkover
- r = Retired
- d = Defaulted

=== Draw ===
First round
1	(Netherlands) K Bertens (Sweden) J Larsson	6	7
(United Kingdom) N Broady (Czech Republic) E Hrdinová	2	5
(Argentina) M Irigoyen (Sweden) C Lister	6	2	[11]
(Switzerland) V Golubic (Croatia) D Jurak	4	6	[9]
3	(Belgium) K Flipkens (Netherlands) D Schuurs	6^{2}	6	[10]
WC	(Switzerland) B Bencic (Austria) B Haas	7^{7}	4	[3]
(United States) N Melichar (United Kingdom) A Smith	6	6
(Netherlands) L Kerkhove (Belarus) L Marozava	1	2
(Russia) N Dzalamidze (Switzerland) X Knoll	7^{8}	3	[10]
(Netherlands) M Krajicek (Czech Republic) B Strýcová	6^{6}	6	[8]
(Ukraine) L Kichenok (Russia) N Vikhlyantseva	2	1
4	(Ukraine) N Kichenok (Australia) An Rodionova	6	6
(Romania) M Buzărnescu (Georgia (country)) O Kalashnikova	0	6	[13]
(Spain) L Arruabarrena (Paraguay) V Cepede Royg	6	4	[11]
WC	(Germany) N Geuer (Germany) A Zaja	6	2	[10]
2	(Poland) A Rosolska (United States) A Spears	4	6	[8]

Quarterfinals
1	(Netherlands) K Bertens (Sweden) J Larsson	6	6
(Argentina) M Irigoyen (Sweden) C Lister	1	2
3	(Belgium) K Flipkens (Netherlands) D Schuurs	3	3
(United States) N Melichar (United Kingdom) A Smith	6	6
(Russia) N Dzalamidze (Switzerland) X Knoll	6	6
4	(Ukraine) N Kichenok (Australia) An Rodionova	3	2
(Romania) M Buzărnescu (Georgia (country)) O Kalashnikova	7	6
WC	(Germany) N Geuer (Germany) A Zaja	5	3

Semifinals
1	(Netherlands) K Bertens (Sweden) J Larsson	6	6
(United States) N Melichar (United Kingdom) A Smith	3	2
(Russia) N Dzalamidze (Switzerland) X Knoll	6	6
(Romania) M Buzărnescu (Georgia (country)) O Kalashnikova	1	3

Final
1	(Netherlands) K Bertens (Sweden) J Larsson	3	6	[10]
(Russia) N Dzalamidze (Switzerland) X Knoll	6	3	[4]
