= 2017 Internationaux Féminins de la Vienne – Doubles =

Doubles
- 2017 Internationaux Féminins de la Vienne

Final
- Champion: (Switzerland) Belinda Bencic (Belgium) Yanina Wickmayer
- Runner-up: (Romania) Mihaela Buzărnescu (Germany) Nicola Geuer
- Score: 7–6^{(9–7)}, 6–3

Events
Singles	Doubles
← 2016 ·	Internationaux Féminins de la Vienne	· 2018 →

Nao Hibino and Alicja Rosolska were the defending champions, but both players chose not to participate.

Belinda Bencic and Yanina Wickmayer won the title after defeating Mihaela Buzărnescu and Nicola Geuer 7–6^{(9–7)}, 6–3 in the final.

== Seeds ==
1. (Argentina) María Irigoyen / (Sweden) Cornelia Lister (semifinals)
2. (Romania) Mihaela Buzărnescu / (Germany) Nicola Geuer (final)
3. (Georgia (country)) Oksana Kalashnikova / (Belgium) Maryna Zanevska (semifinals)
4. (Russia) Anna Blinkova / (Netherlands) Lesley Kerkhove (first round)

== Draw ==
=== Key ===
- Q = Qualifier
- WC = Wild card
- LL = Lucky loser
- Alt = Alternate
- SE = Special exempt
- PR = Protected ranking
- ITF = ITF entry
- JE = Junior exempt
- w/o = Walkover
- r = Retired
- d = Defaulted
- SR = Special ranking

First round
(Turkey) B Eraydın (Chile) D Seguel	6	6
(France) P Heise (France) M Partaud	3	4
4	(Russia) A Blinkova (Netherlands) L Kerkhove	5	3
(Romania) M Niculescu (Czech Republic) T Smitková	7	6
(Switzerland) B Bencic (Belgium) Y Wickmayer	7	6
(United States) B Pera (Netherlands) E Wacanno	5	3
(Georgia (country)) S Shapatava (United Kingdom) E Webley-Smith	6	6
(India) P Thombare (Hungary) P Udvardy	4	3
(Montenegro) D Kovinić (Poland) K Piter	6	7^{8}
WC	(Canada) F Abanda (France) C Paquet	3	6^{6}

Quarterfinals
1	(Argentina) M Irigoyen (Sweden) C Lister	1	6	[10]
(Turkey) B Eraydın (Chile) D Seguel	6	3	[6]
(Romania) M Niculescu (Czech Republic) T Smitková	6	2	[6]
(Switzerland) B Bencic (Belgium) Y Wickmayer	3	6	[10]
(Georgia (country)) S Shapatava (United Kingdom) E Webley-Smith	0	6	[9]
3	(Georgia (country)) O Kalashnikova (Belgium) M Zanevska	6	1	[11]
(Montenegro) D Kovinić (Poland) K Piter	6^{3}	6	[8]
2	(Romania) M Buzărnescu (Germany) N Geuer	7^{7}	2	[10]

Semifinals
1	(Argentina) M Irigoyen (Sweden) C Lister	2	0
(Switzerland) B Bencic (Belgium) Y Wickmayer	6	6
3	(Georgia (country)) O Kalashnikova (Belgium) M Zanevska	6	3	[9]
2	(Romania) M Buzărnescu (Germany) N Geuer	4	6	[11]

Final
(Switzerland) B Bencic (Belgium) Y Wickmayer	7^{9}	6
2	(Romania) M Buzărnescu (Germany) N Geuer	6^{7}	3
