= 2018 Internationaux Féminins de la Vienne – Singles =

Singles
- 2018 Internationaux Féminins de la Vienne

Final
- Champion: (Switzerland) Viktorija Golubic
- Runner-up: (Russia) Natalia Vikhlyantseva
- Score: 3–6, 6–1, 7–5

Events
Singles	Doubles
← 2017 ·	Internationaux Féminins de la Vienne	· 2019 →

Mihaela Buzărnescu was the defending champion, but chose not to participate.

Viktorija Golubic won the title, defeating Natalia Vikhlyantseva in the final, 3–6, 6–1, 7–5.

== Seeds ==
1. (France) Pauline Parmentier (quarterfinals)
2. (Slovakia) Viktória Kužmová (first round)
3. (Slovakia) Anna Karolína Schmiedlová (second round)
4. (Germany) Tatjana Maria (second round)
5. (Switzerland) Stefanie Vögele (second round)
6. (Romania) Monica Niculescu (semifinals)
7. (Russia) Evgeniya Rodina (first round)
8. (Russia) Anna Blinkova (quarterfinals)

== Draw ==
=== Key ===
- Q = Qualifier
- WC = Wild card
- LL = Lucky loser
- Alt = Alternate
- ITF = ITF entry
- PR = Protected ranking
- SR = Special ranking
- SE = Special exempt
- JE = Junior exempt
- JR = Junior Accelerator Programme entrant
- CO = College Accelerator Programme entrant
- NG = Next Gen Accelerator Program entrant
- w/o = Walkover
- r = Retired
- d = Defaulted

=== Finals ===
Semifinals
6	(Romania) Monica Niculescu	6	4	3
(Switzerland) Viktorija Golubic	3	6	6
(Russia) Natalia Vikhlyantseva	6	7^{7}
(Czech Republic) Tereza Smitková	3	6^{4}

Final
(Switzerland) Viktorija Golubic	3	6	7
(Russia) Natalia Vikhlyantseva	6	1	5

=== Top half ===
First round
1	(France) P Parmentier	6	5	6
Q	(Bulgaria) J Terziyska	1	7	4
(France) M Georges	3	6	6
(Georgia (country)) E Gorgodze	6	1	4
(Italy) M Trevisan	4	6^{4}
(Spain) G García Pérez	6	7^{7}
(Russia) V Zvonareva	6	4	3
6	(Romania) M Niculescu	4	6	6
3	(Slovakia) AK Schmiedlová	6	6
(Serbia) D Radanović	1	2
(Switzerland) V Golubic	7^{8}	6
Q	(France) L Adler	6^{6}	3
WC	(France) T Andrianjafitrimo	7^{7}	2	4
(Ukraine) K Zavatska	6^{1}	6	6
WC	(France) M Yerolymos	1	1
8	(Russia) A Blinkova	6	6

Second round
1	(France) P Parmentier	3	6	6
(France) M Georges	6	2	4
(Spain) G García Pérez	2	3^{r}
6	(Romania) M Niculescu	6	5
3	(Slovakia) AK Schmiedlová	1	6^{7}
(Switzerland) V Golubic	6	7^{9}
(Ukraine) K Zavatska	0	2
8	(Russia) A Blinkova	6	6

Quarterfinals
1	(France) P Parmentier	6^{2}	0
6	(Romania) M Niculescu	7^{7}	6
(Switzerland) V Golubic	7^{8}	6
8	(Russia) A Blinkova	6^{6}	1

Semifinals
6	(Romania) M Niculescu	6	4	3
(Switzerland) V Golubic	3	6	6

=== Bottom half ===
First round
5	(Switzerland) S Vögele	6^{4}	7^{8}	6
(United States) J Loeb	7^{7}	6^{6}	2
(Russia) N Vikhlyantseva	6	6
(Germany) T Korpatsch	0	4
(Poland) M Fręch	6^{2}	6	7
WC	(Germany) S Lisicki	7^{7}	2	5
Q	(Czech Republic) J Malečková	1	0
4	(Germany) T Maria	6	6
7	(Russia) E Rodina	4	3
(Czech Republic) T Smitková	6	6
Q	(France) P Heise	4	3
WC	(France) A Hesse	6	6
(Russia) A Kalinskaya	6	6
(France) F Ferro	2	3
(Netherlands) A Rus	7^{7}	6
2	(Slovakia) V Kužmová	6^{4}	2

Second round
5	(Switzerland) S Vögele	5	6	4
(Russia) N Vikhlyantseva	7	3	6
(Poland) M Fręch	5	6	6
4	(Germany) T Maria	7	1	3
(Czech Republic) T Smitková	4	6	7
WC	(France) A Hesse	6	1	5
(Russia) A Kalinskaya	3	6	2
(Netherlands) A Rus	6	3	6

Quarterfinals
(Russia) N Vikhlyantseva	6	6
(Poland) M Fręch	3	4
(Czech Republic) T Smitková	6	3	6
(Netherlands) A Rus	4	6	4

Semifinals
(Russia) N Vikhlyantseva	6	7^{7}
(Czech Republic) T Smitková	3	6^{4}
