= 2017 Upper Austria Ladies Linz – Singles =

Singles
- 2017 Upper Austria Ladies Linz

Final
- Champion: (Czech Republic) Barbora Strýcová
- Runner-up: (Slovakia) Magdaléna Rybáriková
- Score: 6–4, 6–1

Details
- Draw: 32
- Seeds: 8

Events
Singles	Doubles
← 2016 ·	Linz Open	· 2018 →

Dominika Cibulková was the defending champion, but withdrew before the tournament began.

Barbora Strýcová won the title, defeating Magdaléna Rybáriková in the final, 6–4, 6–1.

== Seeds ==
1. (Slovakia) Magdaléna Rybáriková (final)
2. (Czech Republic) Barbora Strýcová (champion)
3. (Netherlands) Kiki Bertens (first round)
4. (Estonia) Anett Kontaveit (first round)
5. (Romania) Sorana Cîrstea (quarterfinals)
6. (Czech Republic) Kateřina Siniaková (first round)
7. (Germany) Tatjana Maria (quarterfinals)
8. (Romania) Monica Niculescu (first round, retired)

== Draw ==
=== Key ===
- Q = Qualifier
- WC = Wild card
- LL = Lucky loser
- Alt = Alternate
- ITF = ITF entry
- PR = Protected ranking
- SR = Special ranking
- SE = Special exempt
- JE = Junior exempt
- JR = Junior Accelerator Programme entrant
- CO = College Accelerator Programme entrant
- NG = Next Gen Accelerator Program entrant
- w/o = Walkover
- r = Retired
- d = Defaulted

=== Finals ===
Semifinals
1	(Slovakia) Magdaléna Rybáriková	6	6
(Switzerland) Viktorija Golubic	4	4
Q	(Romania) Mihaela Buzărnescu	3	6^{3}
2	(Czech Republic) Barbora Strýcová	6	7^{7}

Final
1	(Slovakia) Magdaléna Rybáriková	4	1
2	(Czech Republic) Barbora Strýcová	6	6

=== Top half ===
First round
1	(Slovakia) M Rybáriková	7	6
(Netherlands) R Hogenkamp	5	3
WC	(Austria) B Haas	3	6	4
(Germany) C Witthöft	6	4	6
(Russia) N Vikhlyantseva	6	6
(Paraguay) V Cepede Royg	0	2
(Belgium) A Van Uytvanck	3	5
5	(Romania) S Cîrstea	6	7
3	(Netherlands) K Bertens	3	6^{4}
(United States) V Lepchenko	6	7^{7}
(Slovakia) J Čepelová	6^{6}	4
(Sweden) J Larsson	7^{8}	6
Q	(Bulgaria) V Tomova	3	7^{8}	6
LL	(United Kingdom) N Broady	6	6^{6}	4
(Switzerland) V Golubic	6^{5}	6	6
6	(Czech Republic) K Siniaková	7^{7}	2	3

Second round
1	(Slovakia) M Rybáriková	7^{7}	6
(Germany) C Witthöft	6^{4}	3
(Russia) N Vikhlyantseva	6^{14}	4
5	(Romania) S Cîrstea	7^{16}	6
(United States) V Lepchenko	2	3
(Sweden) J Larsson	6	6
Q	(Bulgaria) V Tomova	6	4	1
(Switzerland) V Golubic	4	6	6

Quarterfinals
1	(Slovakia) M Rybáriková	5	6	6
5	(Romania) S Cîrstea	7	2	1
(Sweden) J Larsson	3	1
(Switzerland) V Golubic	6	6

Semifinals
1	(Slovakia) M Rybáriková	6	6
(Switzerland) V Golubic	4	4

=== Bottom half ===
First round
8	(Romania) M Niculescu	6	1	0^{r}
(Spain) L Arruabarrena	1	6	2
WC	(Switzerland) B Bencic	4	6	7^{9}
(Belgium) K Flipkens	6	2	6^{7}
(Croatia) A Tomljanović	3	6	6
(Puerto Rico) M Puig	6	4	1
Q	(Romania) M Buzărnescu	7^{10}	6
4	(Estonia) A Kontaveit	6^{8}	3
7	(Germany) T Maria	6	6
(Tunisia) O Jabeur	1	4
Q	(Slovakia) V Kužmová	6	7
WC	(Germany) A-L Friedsam	2	5
Q	(Croatia) J Fett	7	6
(Czech Republic) D Allertová	5	2
(United States) M Brengle	5	3
2	(Czech Republic) B Strýcová	7	6

Second round
(Spain) L Arruabarrena	3	6	3
WC	(Switzerland) B Bencic	6	2	6
(Croatia) A Tomljanović	6	6^{1}	1
Q	(Romania) M Buzărnescu	4	7^{7}	6
7	(Germany) T Maria	6	6
Q	(Slovakia) V Kužmová	2	3
Q	(Croatia) J Fett	6	3	3
2	(Czech Republic) B Strýcová	2	6	6

Quarterfinals
WC	(Switzerland) B Bencic	4	7	6^{4}
Q	(Romania) M Buzărnescu	6	5	7^{7}
7	(Germany) T Maria	1	3
2	(Czech Republic) B Strýcová	6	6

Semifinals
Q	(Romania) M Buzărnescu	3	6^{3}
2	(Czech Republic) B Strýcová	6	7^{7}

== Qualifying ==
=== Seeds ===
1. (France) Pauline Parmentier (second round)
2. (Croatia) Jana Fett (qualified)
3. (Romania) Mihaela Buzărnescu (qualified)
4. (Belgium) Yanina Wickmayer (second round)
5. (United States) Sachia Vickery (qualifying competition)
6. (Romania) Ana Bogdan (first round)
7. (Belgium) Maryna Zanevska (second round)
8. (Czech Republic) Barbora Krejčíková (second round)

=== Qualifiers ===
1. (Slovakia) Viktória Kužmová
2. (Croatia) Jana Fett
3. (Romania) Mihaela Buzărnescu
4. (Bulgaria) Viktoriya Tomova

=== Lucky losers ===
1. (United Kingdom) Naomi Broady

=== Draw ===
==== First qualifier ====
First round
1	(France) Pauline Parmentier	6	3	7^{7}
(Germany) Tamara Korpatsch	1	6	6^{4}
(Slovakia) Viktória Kužmová	7	7^{10}
(Germany) Annika Beck	5	6^{8}
(Romania) Alexandra Cadanțu	3	3
(United Kingdom) Naomi Broady	6	6
(Canada) Bianca Andreescu	4	2
8	(Czech Republic) Barbora Krejčíková	6	6

Second round
1	(France) Pauline Parmentier	4	0
(Slovakia) Viktória Kužmová	6	6
(United Kingdom) Naomi Broady	6	6
8	(Czech Republic) Barbora Krejčíková	4	1

Qualifying competition
(Slovakia) Viktória Kužmová	7	6
(United Kingdom) Naomi Broady	5	2

==== Second qualifier ====
First round
2	(Croatia) Jana Fett	6	6
(Hungary) Dalma Gálfi	3	3
(United States) Caroline Dolehide	6	3	4
(United States) Bernarda Pera	3	6	6
(Czech Republic) Tereza Martincová	3	6	6^{6}
WC	(Germany) Antonia Lottner	6	3	7^{8}
(Italy) Jasmine Paolini	6	0	1
5	(United States) Sachia Vickery	3	6	6

Second round
2	(Croatia) Jana Fett	0	6	6
(United States) Bernarda Pera	6	4	2
WC	(Germany) Antonia Lottner	1	0
5	(United States) Sachia Vickery	6	6

Qualifying competition
2	(Croatia) Jana Fett	6	6
5	(United States) Sachia Vickery	1	1

==== Third qualifier ====
First round
3	(Romania) Mihaela Buzărnescu	6	6
PR	(United States) Alexa Glatch	4	2
(United States) Kayla Day	7^{7}	6
WC	(Australia) Isabelle Wallace	6^{3}	2
WC	(Germany) Isabella Pfennig	1	1
(Germany) Anna Zaja	6	6
(Netherlands) Lesley Kerkhove	6	7^{7}
6	(Romania) Ana Bogdan	1	6^{3}

Second round
3	(Romania) Mihaela Buzărnescu	6	6
(United States) Kayla Day	3	4
(Germany) Anna Zaja	5	6^{3}
(Netherlands) Lesley Kerkhove	7	7^{7}

Qualifying competition
3	(Romania) Mihaela Buzărnescu	6	6
(Netherlands) Lesley Kerkhove	1	4

==== Fourth qualifier ====
First round
4	(Belgium) Yanina Wickmayer	6	6
(Russia) Anna Blinkova	3	1
(Serbia) Ivana Jorović	3	4
(Russia) Sofya Zhuk	6	6
(Bulgaria) Viktoriya Tomova	6	6
(Russia) Polina Monova	3	0
WC	(Austria) Julia Grabher	1	4
7	(Belgium) Maryna Zanevska	6	6

Second round
4	(Belgium) Yanina Wickmayer	7^{8}	4	2
(Russia) Sofya Zhuk	6^{6}	6	6
(Bulgaria) Viktoriya Tomova	5	6	6
7	(Belgium) Maryna Zanevska	7	3	2

Qualifying competition
(Russia) Sofya Zhuk	4	4
(Bulgaria) Viktoriya Tomova	6	6
