= 2016 Internationaux Féminins de la Vienne =

- Date: 24–30 October
- Edition: 20th
- Category: ITF Women's Circuit
- Prize money: $100,000
- Surface: Hard / Indoor
- Location: Poitiers, France

Champions

Singles
- (France) Océane Dodin

Doubles
- (Japan) Nao Hibino / (Poland) Alicja Rosolska
- Internationaux Féminins de la Vienne

The 2016 Internationaux Féminins de la Vienne was a professional tennis tournament played on indoor hard courts. It was the 20th edition of the tournament and part of the 2016 ITF Women's Circuit, offering a total of $100,000 in prize money. It took place in Poitiers, France, on 24–30 October 2016.

== Singles main draw entrants ==
=== Seeds ===
Country	Player	Rank^{1}	Seed
ROU	Monica Niculescu	51	1
FRA	Pauline Parmentier	66	2
ROU	Sorana Cîrstea	82	3
FRA	Océane Dodin	83	4
JPN	Nao Hibino	84	5
USA	Lauren Davis	85	6
RUS	Irina Khromacheva	93	7
SUI	Stefanie Vögele	101	8

- ^{1} Rankings as of 17 October 2016.

=== Other entrants ===
The following player received a wildcard into the singles main draw:

- (France) Amandine Hesse
- (France) Fiona Ferro
- (Russia) Elizaveta Kulichkova
- (France) Chloé Paquet

The following players received entry from the qualifying draw:

- (Belgium) An-Sophie Mestach
- (Romania) Andreea Mitu
- (Russia) Natalia Vikhlyantseva
- (United States) Caitlin Whoriskey

The following players received entry by special exempts:

- (Romania) Elena Gabriela Ruse
- (Belgium) Maryna Zanevska

== Champions ==
=== Singles ===
- (France) Océane Dodin def. (United States) Lauren Davis, 6–4, 6–2

=== Doubles ===
- (Japan) Nao Hibino / (Poland) Alicja Rosolska def. (Romania) Alexandra Cadanțu / (Germany) Nicola Geuer, 6–0, 6–0
