= 2017 Internationaux Féminins de la Vienne – Singles =

Singles
- 2017 Internationaux Féminins de la Vienne

Final
- Champion: (Romania) Mihaela Buzărnescu
- Runner-up: (Belgium) Alison Van Uytvanck
- Score: 6–4, 6–2

Events
Singles	Doubles
← 2016 ·	Internationaux Féminins de la Vienne	· 2018 →

Océane Dodin was the defending champion, but chose not to participate.

Mihaela Buzărnescu won the title, defeating Alison Van Uytvanck in the final, 6–4, 6–2.

== Seeds ==
1. (Germany) Tatjana Maria (semifinals)
2. (Romania) Monica Niculescu (second round)
3. (Russia) Ekaterina Alexandrova (quarterfinals)
4. (Belgium) Alison Van Uytvanck (final)
5. (Romania) Mihaela Buzărnescu (champion)
6. (Croatia) Petra Martić (second round)
7. (Croatia) Jana Fett (first round)
8. (France) Pauline Parmentier (second round)

== Draw ==
=== Key ===
- Q = Qualifier
- WC = Wild card
- LL = Lucky loser
- Alt = Alternate
- SE = Special exempt
- PR = Protected ranking
- ITF = ITF entry
- JE = Junior exempt
- w/o = Walkover
- r = Retired
- d = Defaulted
- SR = Special ranking

=== Finals ===
Semifinals
1	(Germany) Tatjana Maria	4	2
5	(Romania) Mihaela Buzărnescu	6	6
4	(Belgium) Alison Van Uytvanck	6	6
WC	(Switzerland) Belinda Bencic	3	2

Final
5	(Romania) Mihaela Buzărnescu	6	6
4	(Belgium) Alison Van Uytvanck	4	2

=== Top half ===
First round
1	(Germany) T Maria	6	6
WC	(France) C Paquet	4	1
(Germany) A Beck	6^{5}	6	6
WC	(Czech Republic) T Smitková	7^{7}	2	2
Q	(Serbia) I Jorović	6	5	6
(Montenegro) D Kovinić	3	7	3
Q	(Georgia (country)) S Shapatava	4	4
6	(Croatia) P Martić	6	6
3	(Russia) E Alexandrova	6	6
(Canada) F Abanda	3	0
(Netherlands) L Kerkhove	6^{5}	5
(Russia) S Zhuk	7^{7}	7
(Ukraine) A Kalinina	1	1
(Russia) A Blinkova	6	6
(Italy) J Paolini	0	3
5	(Romania) M Buzărnescu	6	6

Second round
1	(Germany) T Maria	6	7^{7}
(Germany) A Beck	1	6^{4}
Q	(Serbia) I Jorović	6	6
6	(Croatia) P Martić	1	3
3	(Russia) E Alexandrova	6	3	7^{7}
(Russia) S Zhuk	4	6	6^{4}
(Russia) A Blinkova	2	1
5	(Romania) M Buzărnescu	6	6

Quarterfinals
1	(Germany) T Maria	7	6
Q	(Serbia) I Jorović	5	1
3	(Russia) E Alexandrova	2	4
5	(Romania) M Buzărnescu	6	6

Semifinals
1	(Germany) T Maria	4	2
5	(Romania) M Buzărnescu	6	6

=== Bottom half ===
First round
8	(France) P Parmentier	6	6
PR	(Romania) A Dulgheru	2	2
(Belgium) M Zanevska	0	4
(United States) B Pera	6	6
Q	(Ukraine) K Zavatska	6	6
WC	(France) P Heise	4	3
(Netherlands) R Hogenkamp	3	7^{7}	3
4	(Belgium) A Van Uytvanck	6	6^{4}	6
7	(Croatia) J Fett	2	6	3
(Turkey) B Eraydın	6	3	6
(Germany) T Korpatsch	1	6	2
(Belgium) Y Wickmayer	6	4	6
(Czech Republic) D Allertová	1	1
WC	(Switzerland) B Bencic	6	6
Q	(Liechtenstein) K von Deichmann	2	6	2
2	(Romania) M Niculescu	6	4	6

Second round
8	(France) P Parmentier	6	6^{1}	4
(United States) B Pera	3	7^{7}	6
Q	(Ukraine) K Zavatska	3	2
4	(Belgium) A Van Uytvanck	6	6
(Turkey) B Eraydın	4	2
(Belgium) Y Wickmayer	6	6
WC	(Switzerland) B Bencic	7^{9}	6
2	(Romania) M Niculescu	6^{7}	3

Quarterfinals
(United States) B Pera	3	5
4	(Belgium) A Van Uytvanck	6	7
(Belgium) Y Wickmayer	4	3
WC	(Switzerland) B Bencic	6	6

Semifinals
4	(Belgium) A Van Uytvanck	6	6
WC	(Switzerland) B Bencic	3	2
