= 2017 Upper Austria Ladies Linz =

- Date: 9–15 October
- Edition: 31st
- Category: WTA International
- Draw: 32S / 16D
- Prize money: $250,000
- Surface: Hard (indoor)
- Location: Linz, Austria
- Venue: TipsArena Linz

Champions

Singles
- (Czech Republic) Barbora Strýcová

Doubles
- (Netherlands) Kiki Bertens / (Sweden) Johanna Larsson
← 2016 ·	Linz Open	· 2018 →

The 2017 Upper Austria Ladies Linz was a women's tennis tournament played on indoor hard courts. It was the 31st edition of the Generali Ladies Linz, and part of the WTA International tournaments-category of the 2017 WTA Tour. It was held at the TipsArena Linz in Linz, Austria, from 9 October until 15 October 2017. Second-seeded Barbora Strýcová won the singles title.

== Finals ==
=== Singles ===
- (Czech Republic) Barbora Strýcová defeated (Slovakia) Magdaléna Rybáriková, 6–4, 6–1

=== Doubles ===
- (Netherlands) Kiki Bertens / (Sweden) Johanna Larsson defeated (Russia) Natela Dzalamidze / (Switzerland) Xenia Knoll, 3–6, 6–3, [10–4]

== Points and prize money ==
=== Point distribution ===
Event	W	F	SF	QF	Round of 16	Round of 32	Q	Q2	Q1
Singles	280	180	110	60	30	1	18	12	1
Doubles	280	180	110	60	1	—	—	—	—

=== Prize money ===
Event	W	F	SF	QF	Round of 16	Round of 32^{1}	Q2	Q1
Singles	$43,000	$21,400	$11,500	$6,200	$3,420	$2,220	$1,285	$750
Doubles *	$12,300	$6,400	$3,435	$1,820	$960	—	—	—

_{^{1} Qualifiers prize money is also the Round of 32 prize money}
_{* per team}

== Singles entrants ==
=== Seeds ===
Country	Player	Rank^{1}	Seed
SVK	Magdaléna Rybáriková	28	1
CZE	Barbora Strýcová	29	2
NED	Kiki Bertens	30	3
EST	Anett Kontaveit	36	4
ROU	Sorana Cîrstea	44	5
CZE	Kateřina Siniaková	49	6
GER	Tatjana Maria	54	7
ROU	Monica Niculescu	65	8

- Rankings as of October 2, 2017

=== Other entrants ===
The following players received wildcards into the singles main draw:

- (Switzerland) Belinda Bencic
- (Germany) Anna-Lena Friedsam
- (Austria) Barbara Haas

The following players received entry from the qualifying draw:

- (Romania) Mihaela Buzărnescu
- (Croatia) Jana Fett
- (Slovakia) Viktória Kužmová
- (Bulgaria) Viktoriya Tomova

The following player received entry as a lucky loser:

- (United Kingdom) Naomi Broady

=== Withdrawals ===
Before the tournament

- (Germany) Mona Barthel → replaced by (Czech Republic) Denisa Allertová
- (Slovakia) Dominika Cibulková → replaced by (Switzerland) Viktorija Golubic
- (France) Océane Dodin → replaced by (Belgium) Alison Van Uytvanck
- (Italy) Camila Giorgi → replaced by (United Kingdom) Naomi Broady
- (Latvia) Jeļena Ostapenko → replaced by (United States) Madison Brengle
- (Czech Republic) Lucie Šafářová → replaced by (Slovakia) Jana Čepelová
- (Czech Republic) Markéta Vondroušová → replaced by (Tunisia) Ons Jabeur

=== Retirements ===
- (Romania) Monica Niculescu

== Doubles entrants ==
=== Seeds ===
Country	Player	Country	Player	Rank^{1}	Seed
NED	Kiki Bertens	SWE	Johanna Larsson	49	1
POL	Alicja Rosolska	USA	Abigail Spears	81	2
BEL	Kirsten Flipkens	NED	Demi Schuurs	82	3
UKR	Nadiia Kichenok	AUS	Anastasia Rodionova	185	4

- ^{1} Rankings as of October 2, 2017

=== Other entrants ===
The following pairs received wildcards into the doubles main draw:

- (Switzerland) Belinda Bencic / (Austria) Barbara Haas
- (Germany) Nicola Geuer / (Germany) Anna Zaja
