= 2019 Internationaux Féminins de la Vienne – Doubles =

Doubles
- 2019 Internationaux Féminins de la Vienne

Final
- Champions: (France) Amandine Hesse (France) Harmony Tan
- Runners-up: (Germany) Tayisiya Morderger (Germany) Yana Morderger
- Score: 6–4, 6–2

Events
Singles	Doubles
← 2018 ·	Internationaux Féminins de la Vienne	· 2021 →

Anna Blinkova and Alexandra Panova were the defending champions, but both players decided not to participate.

Amandine Hesse and Harmony Tan won the title, defeating Tayisiya and Yana Morderger in the final, 6–4, 6–2.

== Seeds ==
1. (Russia) Natela Dzalamidze / (Belarus) Lidziya Marozava (semifinals)
2. (United Kingdom) Naomi Broady / (United Kingdom) Eden Silva (semifinals)
3. (Latvia) Diāna Marcinkēviča / (Bulgaria) Julia Terziyska (first round)
4. (Germany) Tayisiya Morderger / (Germany) Yana Morderger (final)

== Draw ==
=== Key ===
- Q = Qualifier
- WC = Wild card
- LL = Lucky loser
- Alt = Alternate
- SE = Special exempt
- PR = Protected ranking
- ITF = ITF entry
- JE = Junior exempt
- w/o = Walkover
- r = Retired
- d = Defaulted
- SR = Special ranking

=== Draw ===
First round
(France) A Albié (France) M Georges	3	2
(Chinese Taipei) Y-c Hsieh (Russia) E Ovcharenko	6	6
3	(Latvia) D Marcinkēviča (Bulgaria) J Terziyska	6^{3}	1
(France) A Hesse (France) H Tan	7^{7}	6
(France) L Adler (Bolivia) N Zeballos	w/o
(Belgium) M Kempen (Luxembourg) E Molinaro
(France) S Callios (France) E Ramirez	1	1
(Lithuania) J Mikulskytė (Ukraine) A Shoshyna	6	6
(France) L Bencheikh (France) A Tubello	3	6	[6]
4	(Germany) T Morderger (Germany) Y Morderger	6	2	[10]
(France) E Lechemia (France) I Ramialison	3	1
(France) S Cakarevic (France) M Yerolymos	6	6
(France) M Halemai (France) M Léonard	6^{7}	2
2	(United Kingdom) N Broady (United Kingdom) E Silva	7^{9}	6

Quarterfinals
1	(Russia) N Dzalamidze (Belarus) L Marozava	6	6
(Chinese Taipei) Y-c Hsieh (Russia) E Ovcharenko	4	4
(France) A Hesse (France) H Tan	6	6
(France) L Adler (Bolivia) N Zeballos	1	3
(Lithuania) J Mikulskytė (Ukraine) A Shoshyna	4	3
4	(Germany) T Morderger (Germany) Y Morderger	6	6
(France) S Cakarevic (France) M Yerolymos	6	4	[7]
2	(United Kingdom) N Broady (United Kingdom) E Silva	1	6	[10]

Semifinals
1	(Russia) N Dzalamidze (Belarus) L Marozava	4	6	[10]
(France) A Hesse (France) H Tan	6	1	[12]
4	(Germany) T Morderger (Germany) Y Morderger	7^{7}	6
2	(United Kingdom) N Broady (United Kingdom) E Silva	6^{5}	3

Final
(France) A Hesse (France) H Tan	6	6
4	(Germany) T Morderger (Germany) Y Morderger	4	2
