= 2018 Internationaux Féminins de la Vienne – Doubles =

Doubles
- 2018 Internationaux Féminins de la Vienne

Final
- Champions: (Russia) Anna Blinkova (Russia) Alexandra Panova
- Runners-up: (Switzerland) Viktorija Golubic (Netherlands) Arantxa Rus
- Score: 6–1, 6–1

Events
Singles	Doubles
← 2017 ·	Internationaux Féminins de la Vienne	· 2019 →

Belinda Bencic and Yanina Wickmayer were the defending champions, but both chose not to participate.

Anna Blinkova and Alexandra Panova won the title, defeating Viktorija Golubic and Arantxa Rus in the final, 6–1, 6–1.

== Seeds ==
1. (Romania) Monica Niculescu / (Kazakhstan) Galina Voskoboeva (quarterfinals)
2. (Germany) Nicola Geuer / (Slovakia) Chantal Škamlová (semifinals)
3. (Switzerland) Viktorija Golubic / (Netherlands) Arantxa Rus (final)
4. (Russia) Anna Blinkova / (Russia) Alexandra Panova (champions)

== Draw ==
=== Key ===
- Q = Qualifier
- WC = Wild card
- LL = Lucky loser
- Alt = Alternate
- SE = Special exempt
- PR = Protected ranking
- ITF = ITF entry
- JE = Junior exempt
- w/o = Walkover
- r = Retired
- d = Defaulted
- SR = Special ranking

=== Draw ===
First round
(Czech Republic) T Smitková (Czech Republic) R Voráčová	w/o
(France) F Ferro (France) M Yerolymos
4	(Russia) A Blinkova (Russia) A Panova	6	6
(Uzbekistan) A Amanmuradova (Latvia) D Marcinkēviča	1	4
(Bulgaria) I Shinikova (Netherlands) E Vogelsang
(France) T Andrianjafitrimo (France) A Hesse	w/o
(France) L Bencheikh (France) Y Mansouri	3	6	[9]
(Italy) C Giovine (Ukraine) K Zavatska	6	1	[11]
(United Kingdom) E Silva (Bulgaria) J Terziyska	1	5
3	(Switzerland) V Golubic (Netherlands) A Rus	6	7
(Russia) S Afifi (Spain) L Barona	0	0
(Poland) M Fręch (United States) J Loeb	6	6

Quarterfinals
1	(Romania) M Niculescu (Kazakhstan) G Voskoboeva	6^{0}	4
(Czech Republic) T Smitková (Czech Republic) R Voráčová	7^{7}	6
4	(Russia) A Blinkova (Russia) A Panova	6	3	[10]
(France) T Andrianjafitrimo (France) A Hesse	1	6	[4]
(Italy) C Giovine (Ukraine) K Zavatska	6	4	[8]
3	(Switzerland) V Golubic (Netherlands) A Rus	3	6	[10]
(Poland) M Fręch (United States) J Loeb	2	6	[5]
2	(Germany) N Geuer (Slovakia) C Škamlová	6	3	[10]

Semifinals
(Czech Republic) T Smitková (Czech Republic) R Voráčová	4	6	[6]
4	(Russia) A Blinkova (Russia) A Panova	6	3	[10]
3	(Switzerland) V Golubic (Netherlands) A Rus	6	6
2	(Germany) N Geuer (Slovakia) C Škamlová	4	3

Final
4	(Russia) A Blinkova (Russia) A Panova	6	6
3	(Switzerland) V Golubic (Netherlands) A Rus	1	1
