= 2016 Internationaux Féminins de la Vienne – Singles =

Singles
- 2016 Internationaux Féminins de la Vienne

Final
- Champion: (France) Océane Dodin
- Runner-up: (United States) Lauren Davis
- Score: 6–4, 6–2

Events
Singles	Doubles
- Internationaux Féminins de la Vienne

Monica Niculescu was the defending champion, but lost to Lauren Davis in the quarterfinals.

Océane Dodin won title, defeating Davis in the final, 6–4, 6–2.

== Seeds ==
1. (Romania) Monica Niculescu (quarterfinals)
2. (France) Pauline Parmentier (semifinals)
3. (Romania) Sorana Cîrstea (first round)
4. (France) Océane Dodin (champion)
5. (Japan) Nao Hibino (second round)
6. (United States) Lauren Davis (final)
7. (Russia) Irina Khromacheva (first round)
8. (Switzerland) Stefanie Vögele (first round)

== Main draw ==
Key

- Q = Qualifier
- WC = Wild card
- LL = Lucky loser
- Alt = Alternate
- ITF = ITF entry
- PR = Protected ranking
- SR = Special ranking
- SE = Special exempt
- JE = Junior exempt
- JR = Junior Accelerator Programme entrant
- CO = College Accelerator Programme entrant
- NG = Next Gen Accelerator Program entrant
- w/o = Walkover
- r = Retired
- d = Defaulted

=== Finals ===
Semifinals
6	(United States) Lauren Davis	6	7^{13}
(Belgium) Alison Van Uytvanck	1	6^{11}
4	(France) Océane Dodin	7^{7}	6
2	(France) Pauline Parmentier	6^{2}	3

Final
6	(United States) Lauren Davis	4	2
4	(France) Océane Dodin	6	6

=== Top half ===
First round
1	(Romania) M Niculescu	6	6
(Serbia) I Jorović	2	2
(Belarus) A Sasnovich	7^{7}	1	6
Q	(Russia) N Vikhlyantseva	6^{4}	6	3
WC	(France) A Hesse	6	6
Q	(Romania) A Mitu	3	0
(Croatia) D Vekić	4	6	1
6	(United States) L Davis	6	2	6
3	(Romania) S Cîrstea	4	4
(Estonia) A Kontaveit	6	6
Q	(United States) C Whoriskey	6	1	3
WC	(France) F Ferro	3	6	6
(Belgium) A Van Uytvanck	6	6
WC	(France) C Paquet	4	2
(Germany) M Barthel	6	6
7	(Russia) I Khromacheva	4	3

Second round
1	(Romania) M Niculescu	4	6	6
(Belarus) A Sasnovich	6	4	3
WC	(France) A Hesse	2	4
6	(United States) L Davis	6	6
(Estonia) A Kontaveit	7	6^{6}	6
WC	(France) F Ferro	5	7^{8}	2
(Belgium) A Van Uytvanck	6	6
(Germany) M Barthel	1	3

Quarterfinals
1	(Romania) M Niculescu	6^{4}	4
6	(United States) L Davis	7	6
(Estonia) A Kontaveit	4	2
(Belgium) A Van Uytvanck	6	6

Semifinals
6	(United States) L Davis	6	7^{13}
(Belgium) A Van Uytvanck	1	6^{11}

=== Bottom half ===
First round
8	(Switzerland) S Vögele	6^{4}	6	4
(Bulgaria) I Shinikova	7^{7}	2	6
(Paraguay) V Cepede Royg	3	0
(Russia) E Alexandrova	6	6
SE	(Belgium) M Zanevska	7^{7}	6
(Spain) S Sorribes Tormo	6^{3}	2
WC	(Russia) E Kulichkova	2	2
4	(France) O Dodin	6	6
5	(Japan) N Hibino	6	7
Q	(Belgium) A-S Mestach	1	5
SE	(Romania) EG Ruse	6	6
(Romania) PM Țig	2	3
(Russia) E Rodina	2	6	6
(Slovakia) AK Schmiedlová	6	3	3
(Luxembourg) M Minella	1	4
2	(France) P Parmentier	6	6

Second round
(Bulgaria) I Shinikova	1	1
(Russia) E Alexandrova	6	6
SE	(Belgium) M Zanevska	0^{r}
4	(France) O Dodin	5
5	(Japan) N Hibino	2	2
SE	(Romania) EG Ruse	6	6
(Russia) E Rodina	2	4
2	(France) P Parmentier	6	6

Quarterfinals
(Russia) E Alexandrova	6	4	2
4	(France) O Dodin	1	6	6
SE	(Romania) EG Ruse	1	3
2	(France) P Parmentier	6	6

Semifinals
4	(France) O Dodin	7^{7}	6
2	(France) P Parmentier	6^{2}	3
