= 2016 Internationaux Féminins de la Vienne – Doubles =

Doubles
- 2016 Internationaux Féminins de la Vienne

Final
- Champions: (Japan) Nao Hibino (Poland) Alicja Rosolska
- Runners-up: (Romania) Alexandra Cadanțu (Germany) Nicola Geuer
- Score: 6–0, 6–0

Events
Singles	Doubles
- Internationaux Féminins de la Vienne

Andreea Mitu and Monica Niculescu were the defending champions, but Niculescu chose not to participate. Mitu played alongside Patricia Maria Țig, but lost in the first round to Nao Hibino and Alicja Rosolska.

Hibino and Rosolska won the title, defeating Alexandra Cadanțu and Nicola Geuer in the final, 6–0, 6–0.

== Seeds ==
1. (Japan) Nao Hibino / (Poland) Alicja Rosolska (champions)
2. (United Kingdom) Jocelyn Rae / (United Kingdom) Anna Smith (semifinals)
3. (Netherlands) Lesley Kerkhove / (Belarus) Lidziya Marozava (semifinals)
4. (Russia) Irina Khromacheva / (United States) Nicole Melichar (first round, withdrew)

== Draw ==
Key

- Q = Qualifier
- WC = Wild card
- LL = Lucky loser
- Alt = Alternate
- ITF = ITF entry
- PR = Protected ranking
- SR = Special ranking
- SE = Special exempt
- JE = Junior exempt
- JR = Junior Accelerator Programme entrant
- CO = College Accelerator Programme entrant
- NG = Next Gen Accelerator Program entrant
- w/o = Walkover
- r = Retired
- d = Defaulted

First round
1	(Japan) N Hibino (Poland) A Rosolska	6	6
(Romania) A Mitu (Romania) PM Țig	4	2
(United States) A Weinhold (United States) C Whoriskey	6	3	[10]
(Belarus) V Lapko (Russia) A Tarasova	4	6	[6]
3	(Netherlands) L Kerkhove (Belarus) L Marozava	6	6
(France) A Hesse (France) P Parmentier	4	2
(Belarus) I Kremen (Latvia) D Marcinkēviča	3	6	[10]
(Uzbekistan) A Amanmuradova (Russia) V Ivakhnenko	6	3	[8]
(Russia) M Marfutina (Russia) A Morgina	6	6
(France) M Partaud (Russia) E Yashina	2	2
(Romania) A Cadanțu (Germany) N Geuer	w/o
4	(Russia) I Khromacheva (United States) N Melichar
(Bulgaria) I Shinikova (Czech Republic) B Štefková
(Belgium) A-S Mestach (Luxembourg) M Minella	w/o
(Slovakia) M Hončová (Romania) EG Ruse	6	3	[8]
2	(United Kingdom) J Rae (United Kingdom) A Smith	2	6	[10]

Quarterfinals
1	(Japan) N Hibino (Poland) A Rosolska	6	7^{7}
(United States) A Weinhold (United States) C Whoriskey	4	6^{3}
3	(Netherlands) L Kerkhove (Belarus) L Marozava	6	6
(Belarus) I Kremen (Latvia) D Marcinkēviča	2	1
(Russia) M Marfutina (Russia) A Morgina	6^{1}	3
(Romania) A Cadanțu (Germany) N Geuer	7^{7}	6
(Belgium) A-S Mestach (Luxembourg) M Minella	4	6^{5}
2	(United Kingdom) J Rae (United Kingdom) A Smith	6	7^{7}

Semifinals
1	(Japan) N Hibino (Poland) A Rosolska	7^{7}	7
3	(Netherlands) L Kerkhove (Belarus) L Marozava	6^{3}	5
(Romania) A Cadanțu (Germany) N Geuer	7	2	[10]
2	(United Kingdom) J Rae (United Kingdom) A Smith	5	6	[7]

Final
1	(Japan) N Hibino (Poland) A Rosolska	6	6
(Romania) A Cadanțu (Germany) N Geuer	0	0
