= Tayisiya Morderger =

German tennis player

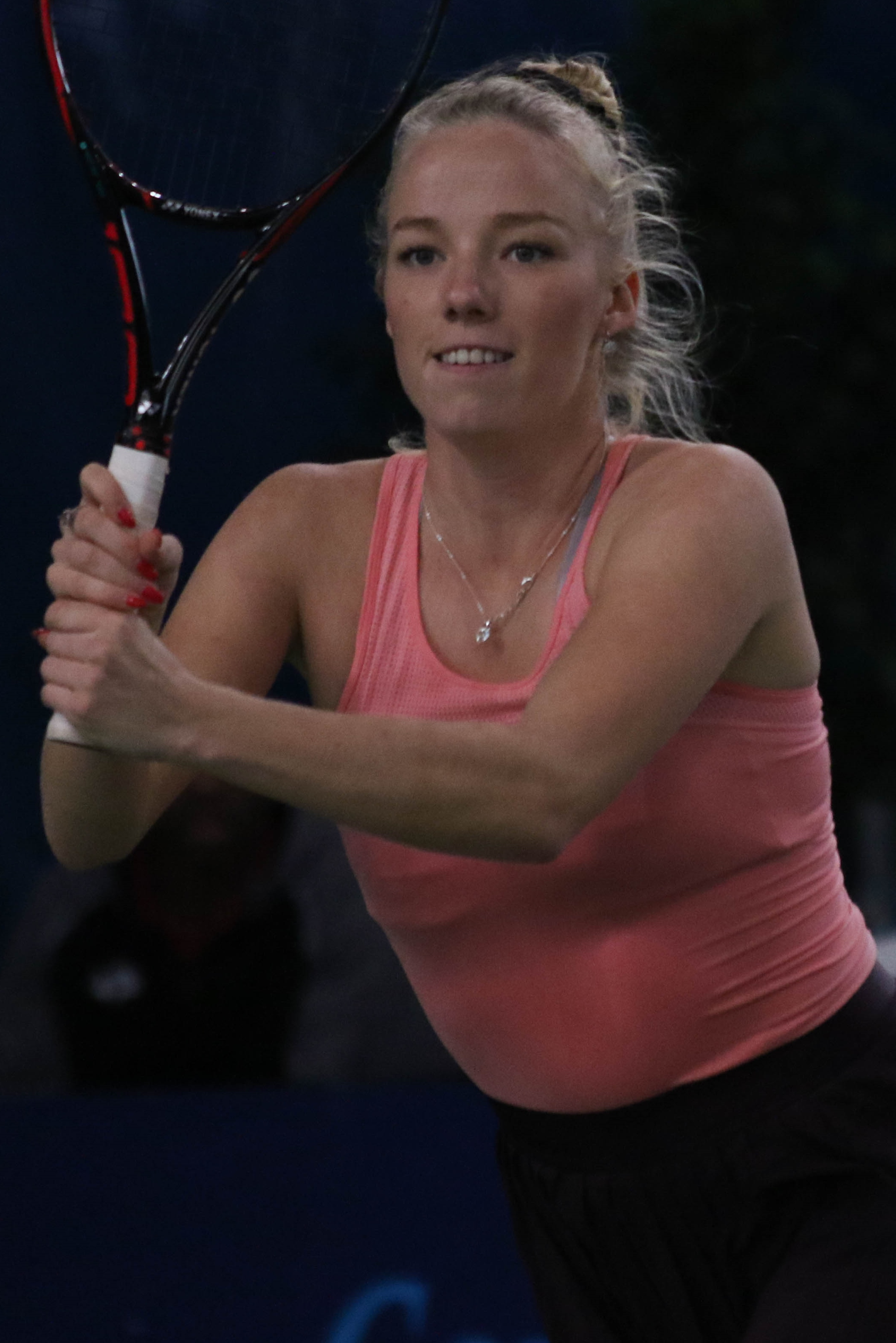
- Tayisiya in 2019
- Country (sports): Germany
- Born: 7 March 1997 (age 29) Kyiv, Ukraine
- Plays: Left (two-handed backhand)
- Prize money: US$156,701

Singles
- Career record: 329–275
- Career titles: 5 ITF
- Highest ranking: No. 400 (18 September 2017)
- Current ranking: No. 1259 (28 September 2026)

Doubles
- Career record: 215–238
- Career titles: 15 ITF
- Highest ranking: No. 241 (13 January 2020)
- Current ranking: No. 395 (28 September 2026)
- Last updated on: 28 September 2026.

Tayisiya Morderger (born 7 March 1997) is a German tennis player.

Morderger has career-high singles ranking of world No. 400, achieved on 18 September 2017, and a best WTA doubles ranking of No. 242, reached on 3 February 2020. She has won five singles titles and twelve doubles titles on tournaments of the ITF Circuit.

Morderger made her WTA Tour main-draw debut at the 2020 Prague Open, partnering her twin sister Yana in the doubles event, falling to Lucie Hradecká and Kristýna Plíšková in the first round.

== Personal life ==
Her twin sister, Yana Morderger, is also a tennis player.

== ITF Circuit finals ==
=== Singles: 13 (5 titles, 8 runner–ups) ===
Legend W10/W15 tournaments (5–8)	Finals by surface Hard (0–4) Clay (4–4) Carpet (1–0)

Result	W–L	Date	Tournament	Tier	Surface	Opponent	Score
Win	1–0	Aug 2013	ITF Enschede, Netherlands	W10	Clay	(Germany) Nina Zander	6–4, 6–7^{(3–7)}, 6–2
Loss	1–1	Oct 2013	ITF Stockholm, Sweden	W10	Hard (i)	(Sweden) Rebecca Peterson	6–7^{(2–7)}, 2–6
Loss	1–2	Jul 2014	ITF Les Contamines, France	W10	Hard	(Spain) Aliona Bolsova	6–3, 3–6, 0–6
Loss	1–3	Oct 2014	ITF Stockholm, Sweden	W10	Hard (i)	(United Kingdom) Naomi Cavaday	6–7^{(3–7)}, 4–6
Loss	1–4	May 2015	ITF Heraklion, Greece	W10	Hard	(Oman) Fatma Al-Nabhani	5–7, 3–6
Loss	1–5	Nov 2016	ITF Antalya, Turkey	W10	Clay	(Turkey) Ayla Aksu	5–7, 1–6
Win	2–5	Nov 2016	ITF Antalya, Turkey	W10	Clay	(Germany) Dana Kremer	6–2, 6–2
Win	3–5	Dec 2016	ITF Antalya, Turkey	W10	Clay	(Bulgaria) Dia Evtimova	7–5, 6–1
Loss	3–6	Jan 2017	ITF Antalya, Turkey	W15	Clay	(Ukraine) Anastasiya Vasylyeva	5–7, 3–6
Loss	3–7	Feb 2017	ITF Antalya, Turkey	W15	Clay	(Germany) Yana Morderger	4–6, 3–6
Loss	3–8	Aug 2017	ITF Rotterdam, Netherlands	W15	Clay	(Denmark) Karen Barritza	6–2, 4–6, 4–6
Win	4–8	Nov 2017	ITF Heraklion, Greece	W15	Clay	(Moldova) Anastasia Dețiuc	7–5, 6–2
Win	5–8	Nov 2019	ITF Solarino, Italy	W15	Carpet	(Italy) Nicole Fossa Huergo	7–6^{(7–5)}, 6–7^{(7–9)}, 6–1

=== Doubles: 31 (15 titles, 16 runner-ups) ===
Legend W80 tournaments (0–1) W60/W75 tournaments (1–0) W40/W50 tournaments (2–2) W25/W35 tournaments (4–4) W10/W15 tournaments (8–9)	Finals by surface Hard (4–4) Clay (8–11) Carpet (3–1)

Result	W–L	Date	Tournament	Tier	Surface	Partner	Opponents	Score
Loss	0–1	Mar 2013	ITF Frauenfeld, Switzerland	W10	Carpet (i)	(Germany) Yana Morderger	(Switzerland) Nina Stadler (Liechtenstein) Kathinka von Deichmann	3–6, 4–6
Loss	0–2	Apr 2016	ITF Antalya, Turkey	W10	Hard	(Germany) Yana Morderger	(United Kingdom) Jazzamay Drew (Belarus) Iryna Shymanovich	6–3, 1–6, [2–10]
Win	1–2	Oct 2016	ITF Antalya, Turkey	W10	Clay	(Germany) Yana Morderger	(Uzbekistan) Arina Folts (Ukraine) Kateryna Sliusar	3–6, 7–6^{(7–5)}, [10–6]
Loss	1–3	Nov 2016	ITF Antalya, Turkey	W10	Clay	(Germany) Yana Morderger	(Turkey) Berfu Cengiz (Serbia) Olga Danilović	4–6, 4–6
Win	2–3	Jan 2017	ITF Antalya, Turkey	W15	Clay	(Germany) Yana Morderger	(Ukraine) Sofiya Kovalets (Ukraine) Kateryna Sliusar	3–6, 7–6^{(7–1)}, [10–6]
Loss	2–4	Jan 2017	ITF Antalya, Turkey	W15	Clay	(Germany) Yana Morderger	(Bulgaria) Dia Evtimova (Bosnia and Herzegovina) Jasmina Tinjić	4–6, 7–6^{(7–4)}, [5–10]
Loss	2–5	Feb 2017	ITF Antalya, Turkey	W15	Clay	(Germany) Yana Morderger	(Bulgaria) Dia Evtimova (Bosnia and Herzegovina) Jasmina Tinjić	6–2, 3–6, [8–10]
Loss	2–6	Mar 2017	ITF Antalya, Turkey	W15	Clay	(Germany) Yana Morderger	(Ukraine) Maryna Chernyshova (Ukraine) Kateryna Sliusar	2–6, 6–7^{(0–7)}
Loss	2–7	Jun 2017	ITF Česká Lípa, Czech Republic	W25	Clay	(Germany) Yana Morderger	(Romania) Laura Ioana Andrei (Czech Republic) Anastasia Zarycká	3–6, 4–6
Win	3–7	Jul 2017	ITF Les Contamines, France	W15	Clay	(Germany) Yana Morderger	(The Bahamas) Kerrie Cartwright (United States) Kariann Pierre-Louis	2–6, 6–4, [10–7]
Loss	3–8	Oct 2017	ITF Pula, Italy	W25	Clay	(Germany) Yana Morderger	(Ukraine) Ganna Poznikhirenko (Bosnia and Herzegovina) Jasmina Tinjić	4–6, 3–6
Win	4–8	Nov 2017	ITF Heraklion, Greece	W15	Clay	(Germany) Yana Morderger	(Moldova) Anastasia Dețiuc (Russia) Elina Nepliy	6–2, 7–6^{(9–7)}
Win	5–8	Nov 2017	ITF Heraklion, Greece	W15	Clay	(Germany) Yana Morderger	(Romania) Gabriela Duca (Romania) Oana Gavrilă	6–4, 3–6, [10–8]
Loss	5–9	Jan 2018	ITF Antalya, Turkey	W15	Clay	(Germany) Yana Morderger	(Russia) Aleksandra Pospelova (Georgia (country)) Sofia Shapatava	2–6, 2–6
Loss	5–10	Mar 2018	ITF Le Havre, France	W15	Clay (i)	(Germany) Yana Morderger	(Belgium) Lara Salden (France) Camille Sireix	6–2, 2–6, [7–10]
Win	6–10	Sep 2018	ITF Pula, Italy	W25	Clay	(Germany) Yana Morderger	(China) Cao Siqi (China) Ma Shuyue	6–7^{(0–7)}, 7–6^{(11–9)}, [12–10]
Loss	6–11	Nov 2018	ITF Shrewsbury, United Kingdom	W25	Hard (i)	(Germany) Yana Morderger	(United Kingdom) Sarah Beth Grey (United Kingdom) Olivia Nicholls	6–0, 3–6, [4–10]
Loss	6–12	Mar 2019	ITF Gonesse, France	W15	Clay	(Germany) Yana Morderger	(France) Mathilde Armitano (France) Elixane Lechemia	6–7^{(1–7)}, 5–7
Win	7–12	Mar 2019	ITF Le Havre, France	W15	Clay (i)	(Germany) Yana Morderger	(Luxembourg) Eléonora Molinaro (Switzerland) Svenja Ochsner	6–4, 6–3
Loss	7–13	Oct 2019	ITF Poitiers, France	W80	Hard (i)	(Germany) Yana Morderger	(France) Amandine Hesse (France) Harmony Tan	4–6, 2–6
Win	8–13	Nov 2019	ITF Solarino, Italy	W15	Carpet	(Germany) Yana Morderger	(United States) Emma Davis (Italy) Nicole Fossa Huergo	6–2, 6–3
Win	9–13	Nov 2019	ITF Solarino, Italy	W25	Carpet	(Germany) Yana Morderger	(Spain) Olga Parres Azcoitia (Romania) Ioana Loredana Roșca	6–3, 6–4
Win	10–13	Dec 2019	ITF Solarino, Italy	W25	Carpet	(Germany) Yana Morderger	(Portugal) Sara Lança (Spain) Olga Parres Azcoitia	6–3, 6–3
Loss	10–14	Jun 2022	ITF Klosters, Switzerland	W25	Clay	(Germany) Yana Morderger	(Romania) Miriam Bulgaru (Czech Republic) Brenda Fruhvirtová	0–6, 1–6
Win	11–14	Mar 2023	ITF Říčany, Czech Republic	W40	Hard (i)	(Germany) Yana Morderger	(Uzbekistan) Nigina Abduraimova; Alena Fomina-Klotz	6–1, 4–6, [10–6]
Loss	11–15	Oct 2023	ITF Lisbon, Portugal	W40	Clay	(Germany) Yana Morderger	(Venezuela) Andrea Gámiz (Netherlands) Eva Vedder	1–6, 2–6
Win	12–15	Oct 2023	ITF Hamburg, Germany	W60	Hard (i)	(Germany) Yana Morderger	Julia Avdeeva; Ekaterina Maklakova	6–1, 6–4
Win	13–15	Jan 2024	ITF Esch-sur-Alzette, Luxembourg	W15	Hard (i)	(Germany) Yana Morderger	(Germany) Josy Daems (Ukraine) Anastasiia Firman	6–2, 6–3
Win	14–15	Oct 2024	ITF Baza, Spain	W35	Hard	(Germany) Yana Morderger	(France) Nahia Berecoechea; Alina Charaeva	6–3, 7–6^{(7–1)}
Loss	14–16	Feb 2025	ITF Mâcon, France	W50	Hard (i)	(Germany) Yana Morderger	(Belgium) Magali Kempen (Lithuania) Justina Mikulskytė	6–7^{(5–7)}, 2–6
Win	15–16	Aug 2026	ITF Oldenzaal, Netherlands	W50	Clay	(Germany) Yana Morderger	(Bulgaria) Isabella Shinikova (Netherlands) Lian Tran	6–3, 6–3
