= Yana Morderger =

German tennis player (born 1997)

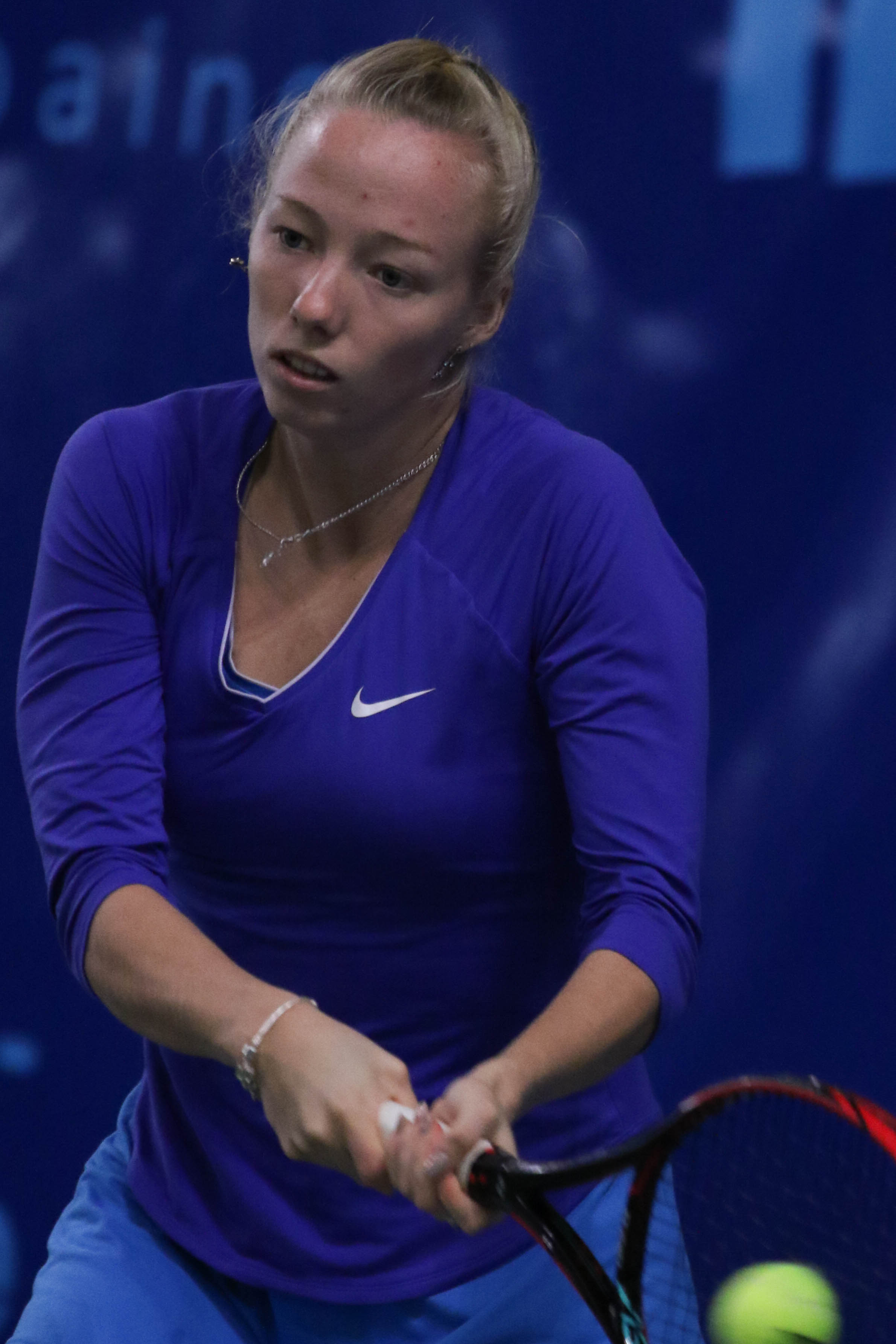
- Yana Morderger in 2019
- Country (sports): Germany
- Born: 7 March 1997 (age 29) Kyiv, Ukraine
- Plays: Right (two-handed backhand)
- Prize money: US$145,855

Singles
- Career record: 266–304
- Career titles: 1 ITF
- Highest ranking: No. 361 (27 June 2022)
- Current ranking: No. 1463 (28 September 2026)

Doubles
- Career record: 229–252
- Career titles: 15 ITF
- Highest ranking: No. 235 (10 February 2020)
- Current ranking: No. 395 (28 September 2026)
- Last updated on: 28 September 2026.

Yana Morderger (born 7 March 1997) is a German tennis player.

Morderger has a career-high singles ranking of world No. 386, achieved on 20 September 2021, and a highest WTA doubles ranking of 235, reached on 10 February 2020. She has won one singles title and thirteen doubles titles on the ITF Circuit.

She made her WTA Tour main-draw debut at the 2020 Prague Open, partnering with her twin sister Tayisiya in the doubles event, falling to Lucie Hradecká and Kristýna Plíšková in the first round.

Morderger's first WTA Tour main-draw match in singles was at the 2022 Internationaux de Strasbourg, where she advanced as a lucky loser. Ranked at world No. 379, she lost to Viktorija Golubic in the first round.

== Personal life ==
Her twin sister, Tayisiya Morderger, is also a tennis player.

== ITF Circuit finals ==
=== Singles: 2 (1 title, 1 runner-up) ===
Legend W60 tournaments (0–1) W15 tournaments (1–0)	Finals by surface Hard (0–0) Clay (1–1)

Result	W–L	Date	Tournament	Tier	Surface	Opponent	Score
Win	1–0	Feb 2017	ITF Antalya, Turkey	W15	Clay	(Germany) Tayisiya Morderger	6–4, 6–3
Loss	1–1	Jul 2021	ITF Amstelveen, Netherlands	W60	Clay	(Netherlands) Quirine Lemoine	5–7, 4–6

=== Doubles: 33 (15 titles, 18 runner-ups) ===
Legend W80 tournaments (0–1) W60/W75 tournaments (1–0) W40/W50 tournaments (2–3) W25/W35 tournaments (4–4) W10/W15 tournaments (8–10)	Finals by surface Hard (4–5) Clay (8–12) Carpet (3–1)

Result	W–L	Date	Tournament	Tier	Surface	Partner	Opponents	Score
Loss	0–1	Mar 2013	ITF Frauenfeld, Switzerland	W10	Carpet (i)	(Germany) Tayisiya Morderger	(Switzerland) Nina Stadler (Liechtenstein) Kathinka von Deichmann	3–6, 4–6
Loss	0–2	Apr 2016	ITF Antalya, Turkey	W10	Hard	(Germany) Tayisiya Morderger	(United Kingdom) Jazzamay Drew (Belarus) Iryna Shymanovich	6–3, 1–6, [2–10]
Win	1–2	Oct 2016	ITF Antalya, Turkey	W10	Clay	(Germany) Tayisiya Morderger	(Uzbekistan) Arina Folts (Ukraine) Kateryna Sliusar	3–6, 7–6^{(7–5)}, [10–6]
Loss	1–3	Nov 2016	ITF Antalya, Turkey	W10	Clay	(Germany) Tayisiya Morderger	(Turkey) Berfu Cengiz (Serbia) Olga Danilović	4–6, 4–6
Win	2–3	Jan 2017	ITF Antalya, Turkey	W15	Clay	(Germany) Tayisiya Morderger	(Ukraine) Sofiya Kovalets (Ukraine) Kateryna Sliusar	3–6, 7–6^{(7–1)}, [10–6]
Loss	2–4	Jan 2017	ITF Antalya, Turkey	W15	Clay	(Germany) Tayisiya Morderger	(Bulgaria) Dia Evtimova (Bosnia and Herzegovina) Jasmina Tinjić	4–6, 7–6^{(7–4)}, [5–10]
Loss	2–5	Feb 2017	ITF Antalya, Turkey	W15	Clay	(Germany) Tayisiya Morderger	(Bulgaria) Dia Evtimova (Bosnia and Herzegovina) Jasmina Tinjić	6–2, 3–6, [8–10]
Loss	2–6	Mar 2017	ITF Antalya, Turkey	W15	Clay	(Germany) Tayisiya Morderger	(Ukraine) Maryna Chernyshova (Ukraine) Kateryna Sliusar	2–6, 6–7^{(0–7)}
Loss	2–7	Jun 2017	ITF Česká Lípa, Czech Republic	W25	Clay	(Germany) Tayisiya Morderger	(Romania) Laura Ioana Andrei (Czech Republic) Anastasia Zarycká	3–6, 4–6
Win	3–7	Jul 2017	ITF Les Contamines, France	W15	Clay	(Germany) Tayisiya Morderger	(The Bahamas) Kerrie Cartwright (United States) Kariann Pierre-Louis	2–6, 6–4, [10–7]
Loss	3–8	Oct 2017	ITF Pula, Italy	W25	Clay	(Germany) Tayisiya Morderger	(Ukraine) Ganna Poznikhirenko (Bosnia and Herzegovina) Jasmina Tinjić	4–6, 3–6
Win	4–8	Nov 2017	ITF Heraklion, Greece	W15	Clay	(Germany) Tayisiya Morderger	(Moldova) Anastasia Dețiuc (Russia) Elina Nepliy	6–2, 7–6^{(9–7)}
Win	5–8	Nov 2017	ITF Heraklion, Greece	W15	Clay	(Germany) Tayisiya Morderger	(Romania) Gabriela Duca (Romania) Oana Gavrilă	6–4, 3–6, [10–8]
Loss	5–9	Jan 2018	ITF Antalya, Turkey	W15	Clay	(Germany) Tayisiya Morderger	(Russia) Aleksandra Pospelova (Georgia (country)) Sofia Shapatava	2–6, 2–6
Loss	5–10	Mar 2018	ITF Le Havre, France	W15	Clay (i)	(Germany) Tayisiya Morderger	(Belgium) Lara Salden (France) Camille Sireix	6–2, 2–6, [7–10]
Loss	5–11	Jul 2018	ITF Dijon, France	W15	Hard	(Romania) Karola Patricia Bejenaru	(France) Emeline Dartron (France) Mylène Halemai	6–3, 6–7^{(1–7)}, [5–10]
Win	6–11	Sep 2018	ITF Pula, Italy	W25	Clay	(Germany) Tayisiya Morderger	(China) Cao Siqi (China) Ma Shuyue	6–7^{(0–7)}, 7–6^{(11–9)}, [12–10]
Loss	6–12	Nov 2018	ITF Shrewsbury, United Kingdom	W25	Hard (i)	(Germany) Tayisiya Morderger	(United Kingdom) Sarah Beth Grey (United Kingdom) Olivia Nicholls	6–0, 3–6, [4–10]
Loss	6–13	Mar 2019	ITF Gonesse, France	W15	Clay	(Germany) Tayisiya Morderger	(France) Mathilde Armitano (France) Elixane Lechemia	6–7^{(1–7)}, 5–7
Win	7–13	Mar 2019	ITF Le Havre, France	W15	Clay (i)	(Germany) Tayisiya Morderger	(Luxembourg) Eléonora Molinaro (Switzerland) Svenja Ochsner	6–4, 6–3
Loss	7–14	Oct 2019	ITF Poitiers, France	W80	Hard (i)	(Germany) Tayisiya Morderger	(France) Amandine Hesse (France) Harmony Tan	4–6, 2–6
Win	8–14	Nov 2019	ITF Solarino, Italy	W15	Carpet	(Germany) Tayisiya Morderger	(United States) Emma Davis (Italy) Nicole Fossa Huergo	6–2, 6–3
Win	9–14	Nov 2019	ITF Solarino, Italy	W25	Carpet	(Germany) Tayisiya Morderger	(Spain) Olga Parres Azcoitia (Romania) Ioana Loredana Roșca	6–3, 6–4
Win	10–14	Dec 2019	ITF Solarino, Italy	W25	Carpet	(Germany) Tayisiya Morderger	(Portugal) Sara Lança (Spain) Olga Parres Azcoitia	6–3, 6–3
Loss	10–15	Jun 2022	ITF Klosters, Switzerland	W25	Clay	(Germany) Tayisiya Morderger	(Romania) Miriam Bulgaru (Czech Republic) Brenda Fruhvirtová	0–6, 1–6
Win	11–15	Mar 2023	ITF Říčany, Czech Republic	W40	Hard (i)	(Germany) Tayisiya Morderger	(Uzbekistan) Nigina Abduraimova; Alena Fomina-Klotz	6–1, 4–6, [10–6]
Loss	11–16	Oct 2023	ITF Lisbon, Portugal	W40	Clay	(Germany) Tayisiya Morderger	(Venezuela) Andrea Gámiz (Netherlands) Eva Vedder	1–6, 2–6
Win	12–16	Oct 2023	ITF Hamburg, Germany	W60	Hard (i)	(Germany) Tayisiya Morderger	Julia Avdeeva; Ekaterina Maklakova	6–1, 6–4
Win	13–16	Jan 2024	ITF Esch-sur-Alzette, Luxembourg	W15	Hard (i)	(Germany) Tayisiya Morderger	(Germany) Josy Daems (Ukraine) Anastasiia Firman	6–2, 6–3
Loss	13–17	Jun 2024	ITF Troisdorf, Germany	W50	Clay	(United States) Chiara Scholl	(Cyprus) Raluca Șerban (Romania) Anca Todoni	0–6, 3–6
Win	14–17	Oct 2024	ITF Baza, Spain	W35	Hard	(Germany) Tayisiya Morderger	(France) Nahia Berecoechea; Alina Charaeva	6–3, 7–6^{(7–1)}
Loss	14–18	Feb 2025	ITF Mâcon, France	W50	Hard (i)	(Germany) Tayisiya Morderger	(Belgium) Magali Kempen (Lithuania) Justina Mikulskytė	6–7^{(5–7)}, 2–6
Win	15–18	Aug 2026	ITF Oldenzaal, Netherlands	W50	Clay	(Germany) Tayisiya Morderger	(Bulgaria) Isabella Shinikova (Netherlands) Lian Tran	6–3, 6–3
