= Mihaela Buzărnescu =

Romanian tennis player (born 1988)

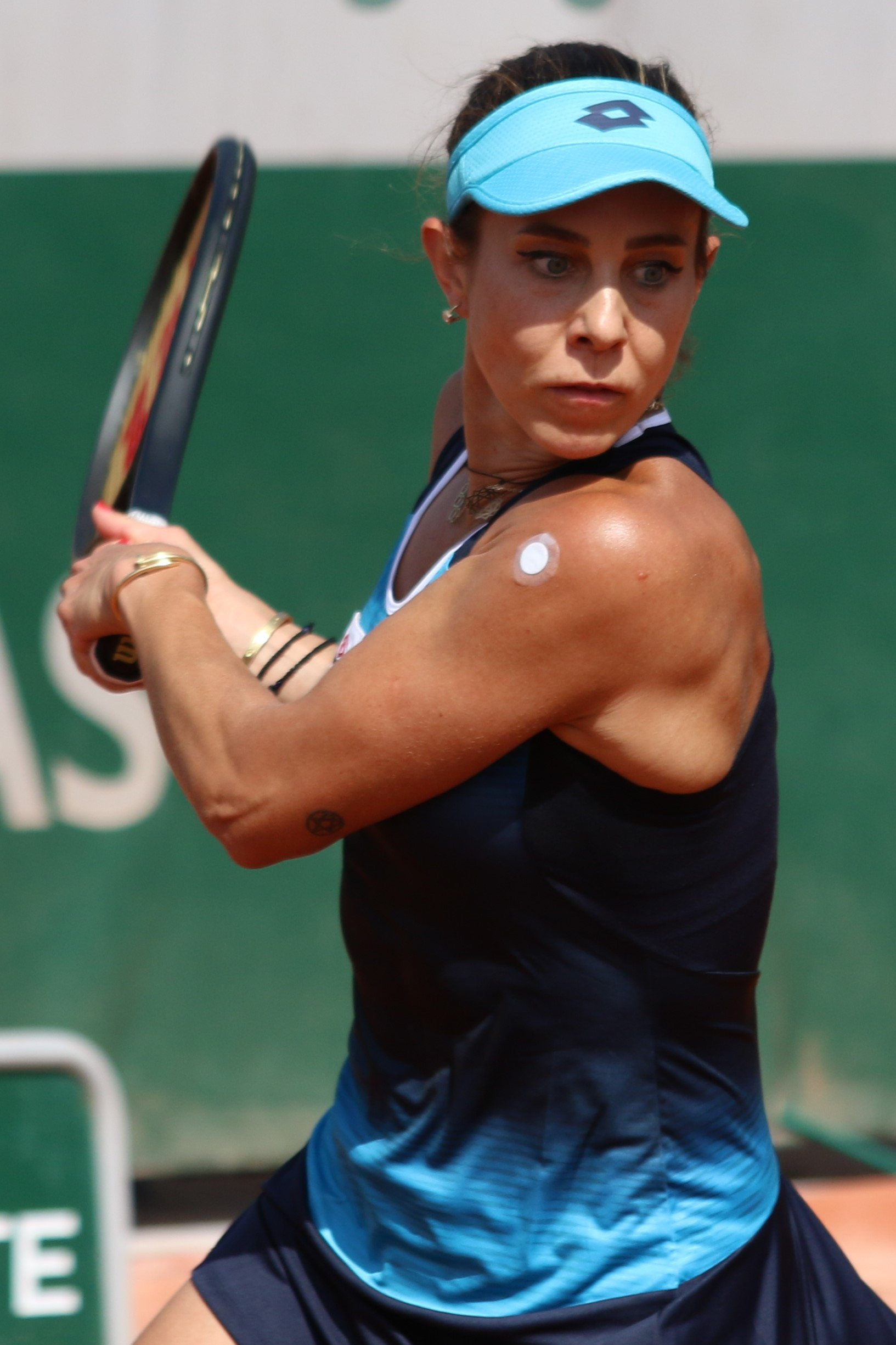
- Buzărnescu at the 2022 French Open
- Country (sports): Romania
- Residence: Bucharest, Romania
- Born: 4 May 1988 (age 38) Bucharest
- Height: 1.75 m (5 ft 9 in)
- Turned pro: 2004
- Plays: Left (two-handed backhand)
- Coach: Artemon Apostu-Efremov, Mihai Buzărnescu (her father)
- Prize money: $2,791,287

Singles
- Career record: 456–285
- Career titles: 1
- Highest ranking: No. 20 (6 August 2018)

Grand Slam singles results
- Australian Open: 1R (2018, 2019, 2021)
- French Open: 4R (2018)
- Wimbledon: 3R (2018)
- US Open: 1R (2017, 2019, 2020)

Other tournaments
- Olympic Games: 2R (2021)

Doubles
- Career record: 327–193
- Career titles: 2
- Highest ranking: No. 24 (22 October 2018)

Grand Slam doubles results
- Australian Open: 2R (2019)
- French Open: QF (2018)
- Wimbledon: QF (2018)

Grand Slam mixed doubles results
- Australian Open: 1R (2019)
- French Open: 1R (2018, 2019)
- Wimbledon: 2R (2018)

Team competitions
- Fed Cup: 3–10
- Scientific career
- Thesis: Optimizarea jocului de tenis la juniori U12-U14 prin dezvoltarea capacităţilor motrice şi psihomotrice (2016)
- Doctoral advisor: Gheorghe Marinescu

Mihaela Buzărnescu (born 4 May 1988) is an inactive Romanian tennis player. She has a career-high WTA singles ranking of No. 20, achieved on 6 August 2018. Her best doubles ranking of world No. 24, she reached on 22 October 2018. She won one singles title and two doubles titles on the WTA Tour.

Buzărnescu has a PhD in sports science from the National University of Physical Education and Sport.

== Career ==
=== 2004: Turned pro, junior success ===
Buzărnescu played her first professional match in 2004. She then won the junior doubles title at the 2006 US Open with Raluca Olaru. Seeded No. 2, they defeated the top-seeded pair of Sharon Fichman and Anastasia Pavlyuchenkova in the final.

=== 2016: Injuries and hiatus ===
Shoulder and knee injuries (the latter prompting two surgeries) forced her off the pro tour for years, long enough that she went back to school, graduating with a doctorate at the National University of Physical Education and Sport in December 2016.

=== 2017: Major and top 100 debuts ===
In 2017, she qualified to make her Grand Slam main-draw debut at the 2017 US Open (tennis). In October 2017, Buzărnescu got to the semifinals of the Linz Open. As a result, she reached the top 100 as world No. 89 on 16 October 2017.

=== 2018: First career titles, top 20 in singles ===
She reached the finals of the Hobart International and the Prague Open. At the Internationaux de Strasbourg, she surrendered a lead in the singles semifinals against Dominika Cibulková, eventually losing the match in three sets. She showed more consistency in the doubles, winning the tournament and her first WTA title with compatriot Raluca Olaru in straight sets against Nadiia Kichenok and Anastasia Rodionova.

In May, Buzărnescu then played in her first French Open, which was also the first Grand Slam tournament, she was seeded. She defeated Vania King in the first round for her first major win. Afterwards, she also won versus Rebecca Peterson. Against No. 4 seed Elina Svitolina in the third round, Buzărnescu won the match in straight sets. This was her biggest career victory and one of the tournament's bigger upsets. She faced No. 13 seed Madison Keys in the fourth round, and lost in two sets.

In the grass-court season, Buzărnescu reached the quarterfinals of the Nature Valley Open in Nottingham, losing to Naomi Osaka. She also played in the doubles tournament with British partner Heather Watson, losing in the final. At the 2018 Birmingham Classic, she once again defeated second seed Svitolina, before losing to eventual champion Petra Kvitová in the semifinals. Buzărnescu then played for a third consecutive week in Eastbourne. She reached the last 16 before losing to Jeļena Ostapenko. However, she reached the doubles final with partner Irina-Camelia Begu.

In August, Buzărnescu captured her first WTA Tour singles title winning in San Jose with a straight-sets victory over Maria Sakkari in the final. Later in August, she played Elina Svitolina once more in the second round of the Rogers Cup in Montreal but suffered a serious ankle injury and was forced to retire. This injury kept her out of the game for two months including the US Open but she did reach her best ever ranking of No. 20 in the world, on 6 August 2018. Buzārnescu ended the year ranked 24.

=== 2019–2020 ===
Buzărnescu began her 2019 season at the Brisbane International. She lost in the first round to eventual finalist Lesia Tsurenko. Seeded second and last year finalist at the Hobart International, she was defeated in the first round by Belinda Bencic. Seeded 25th at the Australian Open, she lost her first-round match to seven-time Grand Slam winner, two-time finalist, and former world No. 1, Venus Williams.

In February, Buzărnescu represented Romania in the Fed Cup tie against the Czech Republic. She lost both of her rubbers to Karolína Plíšková and Kateřina Siniaková. In the end, Romania still managed to win the tie over the Czech Republic 3–2. At the Qatar Ladies Open, she was defeated in the first round by 2016 finalist Jeļena Ostapenko. In Dubai, she lost in the first round to Sofia Kenin. Seeded fourth at the Abierto Mexicano in Acapulco, she won her first match of the season by beating Daria Gavrilova in the first round. She was defeated in the second round by Bianca Andreescu. Seeded 29th at the Indian Wells Open, she suffered a second-round loss at the hands of Daria Gavrilova. Seeded 30th in Miami, she lost in the second round to Alizé Cornet.

Buzărnescu started her clay-court season at the Charleston Open. Seeded 12th, she reached the third round where she lost to fifth seed, 2011 champion, and eventual finalist, Caroline Wozniacki.

=== 2021–2022 ===
Partnering Fanny Stollár, Buzărnescu won the doubles title at the 2021 Budapest Grand Prix, defeating Aliona Bolsova and Tamara Korpatsch in the final.

At the 2022 French Open, she entered the main draw as lucky loser but lost in the first round to Madison Brengle. Playing at the 2022 Wimbledon Championships, she entered the main draw by replacing Leylah Fernandez, and defeated qualifier Nastasja Schunk, in the first round, before losing to 11th seed Coco Gauff.

Buzărnescu recorded wins over Elisabetta Cocciaretto and Yuan Yue to reach the quarterfinals at the 2022 Swedish Open where she lost to Viktoriya Tomova. At the 2022 Iași Open, she retired due to injury while leading by a set and a break against Cristina Dinu in the first round.

== Performance timelines ==
Key
W	F	SF	QF	#R	RR	Q#	P#	DNQ	A	Z#	PO	G	S	B	NMS	NTI	P	NH

(W) winner; (F) finalist; (SF) semifinalist; (QF) quarterfinalist; (#R) rounds 4, 3, 2, 1; (RR) round-robin stage; (Q#) qualification round; (P#) preliminary round; (DNQ) did not qualify; (A) absent; (Z#) Davis/Fed Cup Zonal Group (with number indication) or (PO) play-off; (G) gold, (S) silver or (B) bronze Olympic/Paralympic medal; (NMS) not a Masters tournament; (NTI) not a Tier I tournament; (P) postponed; (NH) not held; (SR) strike rate (events won / competed); (W–L) win–loss record.
To avoid confusion and double counting, these charts are updated at the conclusion of a tournament or when the player's participation has ended.

Only main-draw results in WTA Tour, Grand Slam tournaments, Fed Cup/Billie Jean King Cup and Olympic Games are included in win–loss records.

=== Singles ===
Current through the 2022 Prague Open.

Tournament	2011	2012	...	2015	2016	2017	2018	2019	2020	2021	2022	…	2025	SR	W–L	Win %
Grand Slam tournaments
Australian Open	A	Q2		A	A	Q2	1R	1R	A	1R	Q1		A	0 / 3	0–3	0%
French Open	A	Q2		A	A	A	4R	1R	Q1	2R	1R		Q1	0 / 4	4–4	50%
Wimbledon	A	Q2		A	A	Q2	3R	2R	NH	1R	2R		Q1	0 / 4	4–4	50%
US Open	Q3	Q1		Q1	A	1R	A	1R	1R	Q3	A		A	0 / 3	0–3	0%
Win–loss	0–0	0–0		0–0	0–0	0–1	5–3	1–4	0–1	1–3	1–2		0–0	0 / 14	8–14	36%
Year-end championships
WTA Elite Trophy (Note: WTA Tournament of Champions was held from 2009 to 2014, when WTA Elite Trophy replaced it.)	DNQ						Alt	DNQ	NH					0 / 0	0–0	–
National representation
Summer Olympics	NH	A	NH		A	NH				2R				0 / 1	1–1	50%
WTA 1000
Dubai / Qatar Open (Note: The first Premier 5 event of the year has switched back and forth between the Dubai Tennis Championships and the Qatar Ladies Open since 2009. Dubai was classified as a Premier 5 event from 2009 to 2011 before being succeeded by Doha for the 2012–2014 period. In 2015, Dubai regained its Premier 5 status while Doha was demoted to Premier status. The Premier 5 tournaments were reclassified as WTA 1000 tournaments in 2021.)	A	A		A	A	A	3R	1R	A	A	A		A	0 / 2	2–2	50%
Indian Wells Open	A	A		A	A	A	1R	2R	NH	A	A		A	0 / 2	0–2	0%
Miami Open	A	A		A	A	A	1R	2R	NH	1R	A		A	0 / 3	0–3	0%
Madrid Open	A	A		A	A	A	1R	2R	NH	A	A		A	0 / 2	1–2	33%
Italian Open	A	A		A	A	A	1R	3R	A	A	A		A	0 / 2	2–2	50%
Canadian Open	A	A		A	A	A	2R	Q2	NH	A	A		Q1	0 / 1	1–1	50%
Cincinnati Open	A	A		A	A	A	A	Q1	A	A	A		Q1	0 / 0	0–0	–
China Open	A	A		A	A	A	1R	A	NH		A		A	0 / 1	0–1	0%
Career statistics
Tournaments	0	0		0	0	3	23	23	1	12	3		2	Career total: 65		
Titles	0	0		0	0	0	1	0	0	0	0		0	Career total: 1		
Finals	0	0		0	0	0	3	0	0	0	0		0	Career total: 3		
Overall win–loss	0–0	0–0		0–0	0–0	3–3	36–22	13–26	0–1	7–14	1–4		0–0	1 / 65	60–70	46%
Year-end ranking (Note: WTA ranking: 2013–n/a, 2014–891.)	155	248		260	377	72	24	109	136	121	393		940			

=== Doubles ===
Tournament	2018	2019	2020	2021	2022	SR	W–L
Grand Slam tournaments
Australian Open	1R	2R	A	1R	A	0 / 3	1–3
French Open	QF	1R	A	1R	A	0 / 3	3–3
Wimbledon	QF	1R	NH	A	A	0 / 2	3–2
US Open	A	A	A	A	A	0 / 0	0–0
Win–loss	6–3	1–3	0–0	0–2	0–0	0 / 8	7–8
WTA 1000
Dubai / Qatar Open	2R	1R	A	A	A	0 / 2	1–2
Indian Wells Open	1R	1R	NH	A	A	0 / 2	0–2
Miami Open	A	1R	NH	A	A	0 / 1	0–1
Madrid Open	1R	QF	NH	A	A	0 / 2	2–2
Italian Open	A	1R	A	A	A	0 / 1	0–1
Canadian Open	1R	A	NH	A	A	0 / 1	0–1
China Open	2R	A	NH		A	0 / 1	1–1
Career statistics
Titles	1	0	0	1		Career total: 2	
Finals	4	0	0	2		Career total: 6	

=== Mixed doubles ===
Tournament	2018	2019	...	2022	W–L
Australian Open	A	1R		A	0–1
French Open	1R	1R		A	0–2
Wimbledon	2R	A		A	1–1
US Open	A	A		A	0–0
Win–loss	1–2	0–2		0–0	1–4

== WTA Tour finals ==
=== Singles: 3 (1 title, 2 runner-ups) ===
Legend WTA 500 (1–0) WTA 250 (0–2)	Finals by surface Hard (1–1) Clay (0–1)

Result	W–L	Date	Tournament	Tier	Surface	Opponent	Score
Loss	0–1	Jan 2018	Hobart International, Australia	International (Note: The WTA International tournaments were reclassified as WTA 250 tournaments in 2021.)	Hard	(Belgium) Elise Mertens	1–6, 6–4, 3–6
Loss	0–2	May 2018	Prague Open, Czech Republic	International	Clay	(Czech Republic) Petra Kvitová	6–4, 2–6, 3–6
Win	1–2	Jul 2018	Silicon Valley Classic, United States	Premier (Note: The WTA Premier tournaments were reclassified as WTA 500 tournaments in 2021.)	Hard	(Greece) Maria Sakkari	6–1, 6–0

=== Doubles: 6 (2 titles, 4 runner-ups) ===
Legend WTA 500 (0–1) WTA 250 (2–3)	Finals by surface Clay (2–2) Grass (0–2)

Result	W–L	Date	Tournament	Tier	Surface	Partner	Opponents	Score
Loss	0–1	May 2018	Prague Open, Czech Republic	International	Clay	(Belarus) Lidziya Marozava	(United States) Nicole Melichar (Czech Republic) Květa Peschke	4–6, 2–6
Win	1–1	May 2018	Internationaux de Strasbourg, France	International	Clay	(Romania) Raluca Olaru	(Ukraine) Nadiia Kichenok (Australia) Anastasia Rodionova	7–5, 7–5
Loss	1–2	June 2018	Nottingham Open, United Kingdom	International	Grass	(United Kingdom) Heather Watson	(Poland) Alicja Rosolska (United States) Abigail Spears	3–6, 6–7^{(5–7)}
Loss	1–3	June 2018	Eastbourne International, UK	Premier	Grass	(Romania) Irina-Camelia Begu	(Canada) Gabriela Dabrowski (China) Xu Yifan	3–6, 5–7
Loss	1–4	Apr 2021	Copa Colsanitas, Colombia	WTA 250	Clay	(Germany) Anna-Lena Friedsam	(France) Elixane Lechemia (United States) Ingrid Neel	3–6, 4–6
Win	2–4	Jul 2021	Budapest Grand Prix, Hungary	WTA 250	Clay	(Hungary) Fanny Stollár	(Spain) Aliona Bolsova (Germany) Tamara Korpatsch	6–4, 6–4

== WTA 125 finals ==
=== Doubles: 1 (runner-up) ===
Result	Date	Tournament	Surface	Partner	Opponents	Score
Loss	Jul 2022	Båstad Open, Sweden	Clay	(Russia) Irina Khromacheva	(Japan) Misaki Doi (Sweden) Rebecca Peterson	w/o

== ITF Circuit finals ==
=== Singles: 31 (23 titles, 8 runner-ups) ===
Legend $100,000 tournaments $80,000 tournaments $60,000 tournaments $25,000 tournaments $10,000 tournaments	Finals by surface Hard (8–3) Clay (14–4) Carpet (1–1)

Result	W–L	Date	Tournament	Tier	Surface	Opponent	Score
Win	1–0	Jun 2004	ITF Pitești, Romania	10,000	Clay	(Romania) Liana Balaci	6–3, 7–6^{(7–4)}
Win	2–0	Jun 2004	ITF Brașov, Romania	10,000	Clay	(Argentina) Andrea Benítez	6–3, 7–5
Win	3–0	May 2006	ITF La Palma, Spain	25,000	Hard	(Croatia) Nadja Pavić	6–3, 6–7^{(4–7)}, 6–3
Loss	3–1	May 2007	ITF Rabat, Morocco	10,000	Clay	(Russia) Yuliya Kalabina	1–6, 1–6
Win	4–1	Jun 2008	ITF Pitești, Romania	10,000	Clay	(Hungary) Palma Kiraly	6–0, 6–3
Win	5–1	Jun 2008	ITF Bucharest, Romania	10,000	Clay	(Italy) Federica di Sarra	6–2, 6–2
Loss	5–2	Mar 2010	ITF Antalya, Turkey	10,000	Clay	(Ukraine) Valentyna Ivakhnenko	3–6, 0–6
Win	6–2	Aug 2010	ITF Oneşti, Romania	10,000	Clay	(Romania) Ionela-Andreea Iova	6–0, 6–1
Loss	6–3	Aug 2010	ITF Bucharest, Romania	10,000	Clay	(Romania) Ingrid-Alexandra Radu	5–7, 6–1, 3–6
Win	7–3	Aug 2010	ITF Balş, Romania	10,000	Clay	(Romania) Alexandra Cadanţu	6–3, 6–2
Loss	7–4	Dec 2010	ITF Dubai, United Arab Emirates	10,000	Hard	(Russia) Marta Sirotkina	0–6, 0–6
Win	8–4	May 2011	ITF İzmir, Turkey	25,000	Hard	(United Kingdom) Naomi Broady	7–5, 6–4
Win	9–4	July 2011	ITF Craiova, Romania	25,000	Clay	(Italy) Annalisa Bona	6–2, 3–6, 6–4
Win	10–4	July 2011	ITF Zwevegem, Belgium	25,000	Clay	(Netherlands) Bibiane Schoofs	3–6, 6–2, 6–4
Win	11–4	Sep 2014	ITF Bucharest, Romania	10,000	Clay	(Romania) Simona Ionescu	6–3, 2–6, 6–1
Win	12–4	Mar 2015	ITF Port El Kantaoui, Tunisia	10,000	Hard	(France) Lou Brouleau	6–0, 6–1
Win	13–4	Apr 2015	ITF Port El Kantaoui	10,000	Hard	(Slovenia) Natalija Sipek	6–1, 6–0
Win	14–4	Aug 2015	ITF Westende, Belgium	25,000	Hard	(France) Océane Dodin	6−1, 6–1
Loss	14–5	Nov 2015	ITF Zawada, Poland	25,000	Carpet (i)	(Serbia) Ivana Jorović	2–6, 2–6
Win	15–5	Dec 2015	ITF Cairo, Egypt	25,000	Clay	(Russia) Valentyna Ivakhnenko	6–0, 6–3
Win	16–5	Jun 2017	Hódmezővásárhely Ladies Open, Hungary	60,000	Clay	(Montenegro) Danka Kovinić	6–2, 6–1
Win	17–5	Jun 2017	İzmir Cup, Turkey	60,000	Hard	(Japan) Eri Hozumi	6–1, 6–0
Win	18–5	Jul 2017	ITF Getxo, Spain	25,000	Clay	(Mexico) Renata Zarazúa	6–2, 6–2
Win	19–5	Jul 2017	Reinert Open, Germany	60,000	Clay	(Austria) Barbara Haas	6–0, 6–2
Loss	19–6	Aug 2017	GB Pro-Series Foxhills, UK	25,000	Hard	(Italy) Jasmine Paolini	4–6, 6–1, 4–6
Win	20–6	Sep 2017	Open de Biarritz, France	80,000	Clay	(Switzerland) Patty Schnyder	6–4, 6–3
Win	21–6	Oct 2017	Internationaux de Poitiers, France	100,000	Hard (i)	(Belgium) Alison Van Uytvanck	6–4, 6–2
Loss	21–7	Nov 2017	Tokyo Open, Japan	100,000	Hard	(China) Zhang Shuai	4–6, 0–6
Win	22–7	Nov 2017	Toyota World Challenge, Japan	60,000+H	Carpet (i)	(Slovenia) Tamara Zidanšek	6–0, 6–1
Loss	22–8	Sep 2021	Open de Valencia, Spain	80,000	Clay	(Netherlands) Arantxa Rus	4–6, 6–7^{(3–7)}
Win	23–8	Oct 2021	ITF Le Neubourg, France	80,000+H	Hard	(Hungary) Anna Bondár	6–1, 6–3

=== Doubles: 56 (34 titles, 22 runner-ups) ===
Legend $100,000 tournaments $80,000 tournaments $50/60,000 tournaments $25,000 tournaments $10,000 tournaments	Finals by surface Hard (7–7) Clay (26–15) Carpet (1–0)

Result	W–L	Date	Tournament	Tier	Surface	Partner	Opponents	Score
Win	1–0	Jun 2004	ITF Constanța, Romania	10,000	Clay	(Romania) Gabriela Niculescu	(Romania) Bianca Bonifate (Romania) Diana Gae	6–4, 6–3
Win	2–0	Jun 2004	ITF Pitești, Romania	10,000	Clay	(Romania) Gabriela Niculescu	(Argentina) Andrea Benítez (Uruguay) Estefanía Craciún	6–4, 6–4
Loss	2–1	Apr 2005	ITF Mumbai, India	10,000	Hard	(India) Sanaa Bhambri	(Chinese Taipei) Chan Chin-wei (Russia) Julia Efremova	2–6, 1–6
Loss	2–2	Jul 2006	ITF Båstad, Sweden	25,000	Clay	(Romania) Magda Mihalache	(Argentina) Erica Krauth (France) Aurélie Védy	6–2, 4–6, 4–6
Loss	2–3	Aug 2006	ITF Moscow, Russia	25,000	Clay	(Russia) Evgeniya Rodina	(Russia) Maria Kondratieva (Russia) Ekaterina Makarova	6–4, 4–6, 1–6
Loss	2–4	Apr 2007	ITF Split, Croatia	10,000	Clay	(Romania) Antonia Xenia Tout	(Poland) Olga Brózda (Poland) Natalia Kołat	2–6, 1–6
Win	3–4	Apr 2007	ITF Hvar, Croatia	10,000	Clay	(Poland) Magdalena Kiszczyńska	(France) Émilie Bacquet (Serbia) Karolina Jovanović	6–4, 6–2
Loss	3–5	Apr 2007	ITF Bol, Croatia	10,000	Clay	(Sweden) Nadja Roma	(Czech Republic) Iveta Gerlová (Czech Republic) Lucie Kriegsmannová	3–6, 5–7
Win	4–5	May 2007	ITF Rabat, Morocco	10,000	Clay	(Austria) Melanie Klaffner	(Italy) Silvia Disderi (Algeria) Samia Medjahdi	6–1, 6–4
Loss	4–6	Aug 2007	ITF Bucharest, Romania	25,000	Clay	(Romania) Monica Niculescu	(Romania) Sorana Cîrstea (Romania) Ágnes Szatmári	w/o
Loss	4–7	Aug 2007	ITF Penza, Russia	50,000	Clay	(Ukraine) Veronika Kapshay	(France) Sophie Lefèvre (Romania) Ágnes Szatmári	1–6, 2–6
Win	5–7	Sep 2007	ITF Sofia, Bulgaria	25,000	Clay	(Poland) Magdalena Kiszczyńska	(Brazil) Joana Cortez (Brazil) Teliana Pereira	6–4, 6–7^{(2–7)}, [10–4]
Win	6–7	Sep 2007	Batumi Ladies Open, Georgia	25,000	Hard	(Serbia) Vojislava Lukić	(Russia) Vasilisa Davydova (Russia) Marina Shamayko	6–2, 6–4
Win	7–7	Jun 2008	ITF Pitești, Romania	10,000	Clay	(Romania) Laura Ioana Andrei	(Romania) Simona Matei (Italy) Valentina Sulpizio	7–5, 3–6, [10–2]
Win	8–7	Jun 2008	ITF Bucharest, Romania	10,000	Clay	(Romania) Laura Ioana Andrei	(Italy) Benedetta Davato (Italy) Valentina Sulpizio	6–4, 4–6, [10–6]
Loss	8–8	Jul 2008	Bella Cup Toruń, Poland	25,000	Clay	(Russia) Anastasia Pivovarova	(Poland) Olga Brózda (Poland) Magdalena Kiszczyńska	6–4, 4–6, [2–10]
Win	9–8	Jul 2008	ITF Kharkiv, Ukraine	25,000	Clay	(Georgia (country)) Oksana Kalashnikova	(Ukraine) Kristina Antoniychuk (Ukraine) Lesia Tsurenko	6–1, 6–4
Win	10–8	Jun 2009	ITF Bucharest, Romania	10,000	Clay	(Romania) Elora Dabija	(Romania) Laura Ioana Andrei (Romania) Ioana Gașpar	1–6, 7–5, [10–5]
Win	11–8	Oct 2009	ITF Belek, Turkey	10,000	Clay	(Czech Republic) Kateřina Vaňková	(Portugal) Magali de Lattre (Morocco) Fatima El Allami	6–1, 6–1
Win	12–8	Nov 2009	ITF Le Havre, France	10,000	Clay	(Russia) Marina Melnikova	(France) Amandine Hesse (France) Alizé Lim	6–2, 7–6^{(7–4)}
Win	13–8	Nov 2009	ITF Cairo, Egypt	25,000	Clay	(France) Laura Thorpe	(Oman) Fatma Al-Nabhani (Russia) Galina Fokina	6–4, 6–0
Loss	13–9	Mar 2010	ITF Antalya, Turkey	10,000	Clay	(Australia) Alenka Hubacek	(Ukraine) Yuliya Beygelzimer (Greece) Anna Gerasimou	w/o
Win	14–9	Apr 2010	ITF Antalya, Turkey	10,000	Clay	(Bulgaria) Dalia Zafirova	(Czech Republic) Veronika Chvojková (Czech Republic) Martina Kubičíková	7–6^{(7–1)}, 7–5
Win	15–9	Apr 2010	ITF Vic, Spain	10,000	Clay	(Romania) Cristina Stancu	(Poland) Olga Brózda (Poland) Barbara Sobaszkiewicz	7–5, 3–6, [10–7]
Win	16–9	Aug 2010	ITF Oneşti, Romania	10,000	Clay	(Romania) Laura Ioana Andrei	(Romania) Camelia Hristea (Bulgaria) Biljana Pavlova	7–6^{(9–7)}, 6–2
Win	17–9	Aug 2010	ITF Bucharest, Romania	10,000	Clay	(Romania) Laura Ioana Andrei	(Romania) Diana Enache (Romania) Camelia Hristea	6–1, 6–3
Win	18–9	Sep 2010	Royal Cup Podgorica, Montenegro	25,000	Clay	(Romania) Irina-Camelia Begu	(Russia) Valeriya Solovyeva (Ukraine) Maryna Zanevska	5–7, 7–5, [12–10]
Loss	18–10	Oct 2010	ITF Kharkiv, Ukraine	25,000	Clay	(Russia) Marina Shamayko	(Ukraine) Anna Piven (Ukraine) Anastasiya Vasylyeva	4–6, 4–6
Win	19–10	May 2011	Wiesbaden Open, Germany	10,000	Clay	(Australia) Karolina Wlodarczak	(Germany) Dejana Raickovic (Netherlands) Ghislaine van Baal	6–7^{(4–7)}, 6–3, [10–6]
Loss	19–11	May 2011	ITF İzmir, Turkey	25,000	Hard	(Croatia) Tereza Mrdeža	(United Kingdom) Naomi Broady (United Kingdom) Lisa Whybourn	6–3, 6–7^{(4–7)}, [7–10]
Win	20–11	Jun 2011	ITF Florence, Italy	10,000	Clay	(Slovakia) Zuzana Zlochová	(Italy) Nicole Clerico (Italy) Valentina Sulpizio	6–3, 6–4
Loss	20–12	Jul 2011	ITF Craiova, Romania	25,000	Clay	(Romania) Elena Bogdan	(Romania) Diana Enache (Netherlands) Daniëlle Harmsen	6–4, 6–7^{(5–7)}, [6–10]
Win	21–12	Jul 2011	ITF Samsun, Turkey	25,000	Hard	(Slovenia) Tadeja Majerič	(Turkey) Çağla Büyükakçay (Turkey) Pemra Özgen	6–1, 6–4
Win	22–12	Sep 2011	Saransk Cup, Russia	50,000	Clay	(Serbia) Teodora Mirčić	(Czech Republic) Eva Hrdinová (Ukraine) Veronika Kapshay	6–3, 6–1
Loss	22–13	Sep 2011	Zagreb Ladies Open, Croatia	50,000	Clay	(Croatia) Maria Abramović	(Portugal) Maria João Koehler (Hungary) Katalin Marosi	0–6, 3–6
Win	23–13	Oct 2011	Telavi Open, Georgia	50,000	Clay	(Romania) Elena Bogdan	(Georgia (country)) Ekaterine Gorgodze (Italy) Anastasia Grymalska	1–6, 6–1, [10–3]
Loss	23–14	Feb 2012	ITF Surprise, United States	25,000	Hard	(Russia) Valeriya Solovyeva	(United States) Maria Sanchez (United States) Yasmin Schnack	4–6, 3–6
Win	24–14	July 2012	ITF Zwevegem, Belgium	25,000	Clay	(Germany) Nicola Geuer	(Netherlands) Kim Kilsdonk (Netherlands) Nicolette van Uitert	7–6^{(7–5)}, 1–6, [10–4]
Win	25–14	Sep 2012	ITF Mont-de-Marsan, France	25,000	Clay	(Switzerland) Timea Bacsinszky	(Brazil) Teliana Pereira (Bulgaria) Aleksandrina Naydenova	6–4, 6–1
Loss	25–15	Mar 2015	ITF Port El Kantaoui, Tunisia	10,000	Hard	(Ukraine) Olena Kyrpot	(Portugal) Inês Murta (Norway) Melanie Stokke	1–6, 5–7
Win	26–15	Mar 2015	ITF Port El Kantaoui, Tunisia	10,000	Hard	(Ukraine) Olena Kyrpot	(Republic of Ireland) Jennifer Claffey (Liechtenstein) Kathinka von Deichmann	6–4, 6–2
Win	27–15	Apr 2015	ITF Pula, Italy	25,000	Clay	(Romania) Irina Bara	(Italy) Corinna Dentoni (Italy) Claudia Giovine	6–3, 2–6, [10–4]
Win	28–15	Oct 2015	Challenger de Saguenay, Canada	50,000	Hard (i)	(Poland) Justyna Jegiołka	(Canada) Sharon Fichman (United States) Maria Sanchez	7–6^{(8–6)}, 4–6, [10–7]
Win	29–15	Nov 2015	ITF Zawada, Poland	25,000	Carpet (i)	(Poland) Justyna Jegiołka	(Germany) Kim Grajdek (Russia) Ekaterina Yashina	6–2, 6–3
Loss	29–16	Sep 2016	ITF Mamaia, Romania	25,000	Clay	(Romania) Irina Bara	(Slovakia) Vivien Juhászová (Czech Republic) Kateřina Kramperová	6–7^{(3–7)}, 6–2, [7–10]
Loss	29–17	Sep 2016	ITF Bucha, Ukraine	25,000	Clay	(Moldova) Alexandra Perper	(Russia) Valentyna Ivakhnenko (Russia) Anastasiya Komardina	3–6, 1–6
Win	30–17	Oct 2016	Challenger de Saguenay, Canada	50,000	Hard (i)	(Romania) Elena Bogdan	(Canada) Bianca Andreescu (Canada) Charlotte Robillard-Millette	6–4, 6–7^{(4–7)}, [10–6]
Win	31–17	Oct 2016	Abierto Tampico, Mexico	50,000	Hard	(Belgium) Elise Mertens	(United States) Usue Maitane Arconada (United Kingdom) Katie Swan	6–0, 6–2
Loss	31–18	Nov 2016	Waco Showdown, U.S.	50,000	Hard	(Mexico) Renata Zarazúa	(Netherlands) Michaëlla Krajicek (United States) Taylor Townsend	w/o
Win	32–18	May 2017	Dunakeszi Open, Hungary	25,000	Clay	(Romania) Irina Bara	(Romania) Daiana Negreanu (Romania) Oana Georgeta Simion	1–6, 6–1, [10–3]
Loss	32–19	Jul 2017	Prague Open, Czech Republic	80,000	Clay	(Ukraine) Alona Fomina	(Russia) Anastasia Potapova (Ukraine) Dayana Yastremska	2–6, 2–6
Loss	32–20	Aug 2017	GB Pro-Series Foxhills, UK	25,000	Hard	(Poland) Justyna Jegiołka	(Romania) Laura Ioana Andrei (Czech Republic) Petra Krejsová	6–4, 2–6, [9–11]
Win	33–20	Sep 2017	Open de Biarritz, France	80,000	Clay	(Romania) Irina Bara	(Spain) Cristina Bucșa (Australia) Isabelle Wallace	6–3, 6–1
Loss	33–21	Sep 2017	Open de Saint-Malo, France	60,000	Clay	(Romania) Irina Bara	(Latvia) Diāna Marcinkēviča (Chile) Daniela Seguel	3–6, 3–6
Loss	33–22	Oct 2017	Internationaux de Poitiers, France	100,000	Hard (i)	(Germany) Nicola Geuer	(Switzerland) Belinda Bencic (Belgium) Yanina Wickmayer	6–7^{(7–9)}, 3–6
Win	34–22	Dec 2017	Dubai Tennis Challenge, United Arab Emirates	100,000+H	Hard	(Russia) Alena Fomina	(Netherlands) Lesley Kerkhove (Belarus) Lidziya Marozava	6–4, 6–3

== Head-to-head records ==
=== Record against top 10 players ===
Buzărnescu's record against players who have been ranked in the top 10. Active players are in boldface.

**Player**	**Record**	**Win%**	**Hard**	**Clay**	**Grass**	**Last match**
**Number 1 ranked players**						
**(Poland) Iga Świątek**	0–1	0%	0–1	–	–	Lost (1–6, 0–6) at 2022 BJKC QR
**(United States) Serena Williams**	0–1	0%	–	0–1	–	Lost (3–6, 7–5, 1–6) at 2021 French Open
**(Spain)** Garbiñe Muguruza	0–1	0%	–	0–1	–	Lost (4–6, 3–6) at 2012 Acapulco qualifying
**(Romania)** Simona Halep	0–2	0%	–	0–1	0–1	Lost (3–6, 6–4, 2–6) at 2019 Wimbledon
**(Japan) Naomi Osaka**	0–2	0%	–	0–1	0–1	Lost (3–6, 3–6) at 2019 Rome
(Russia) Maria Sharapova	0–2	0%	0–1	0–1	–	Lost (4–6, 1–6) at 2018 Madrid
**(United States) Venus Williams**	0–2	0%	0–1	–	0–1	Lost (5–7, 6–4, 3–6) at 2021 Wimbledon
(Denmark) Caroline Wozniacki	0–3	0%	0–2	0–1	–	Lost (4–6, 6–3, 3–6) at 2019 Charleston
**(Czech Republic) Karolína Plíšková**	0–4	0%	0–1	–	0–3	Lost (3–6, 4–6) at 2019 Birmingham
Number 2 ranked players						
**(Estonia)** Anett Kontaveit	1–0	100%	1–0	–	–	Won (7–6^{(10–8)}, 6–3) at 2017 Linz Open
**(Spain) Paula Badosa**	2–2	50%	1–0	1–2	–	Lost (0–6, 4–6) at 2021 Belgrade
**(Belarus) Aryna Sabalenka**	1–2	33%	0–1	0–1	1–0	Won (6–7^{(3–7)}, 6–1, 6–4) at 2018 Wimbledon
**(Russia)** Svetlana Kuznetsova	0–1	0%	–	0–1	–	Lost (4–6, 2–6) at 2019 Prague
**(Czech Republic) Barbora Krejčíková**	0–1	0%	–	0–1	–	Lost (2–6, 2–6) at 2015 Bursa Cup
**(Czech Republic)** Petra Kvitová	0–2	0%	–	0–1	0–1	Lost (3–6, 2–6) at 2018 Birmingham
Number 3 ranked players						
**(Greece) Maria Sakkari**	1–0	100%	1–0	–	–	Won (6–1, 6–0) at 2018 San Jose
**(Ukraine) Elina Svitolina**	2–1	67%	0–1	1–0	1–0	Lost (3–6, 7–6^{(7–5)}, 3–4, ret.) at 2018 Montréal
**(United States) Jessica Pegula**	1–1	50%	0–1	–	1–0	Lost (3–6, 6–7) at Cincinnati 2019
**(United States) Sloane Stephens**	0–1	0%	0–1	–	–	Lost (3–6, 3–6) at 2020 US Open
Number 4 ranked players						
(Netherlands) Kiki Bertens	1–1	50%	–	0–1	1–0	Won (3–6, 7–6^{(7–5)}, 6–3) at 2018 Eastbourne
**(Canada) Bianca Andreescu**	1–2	33%	1–2	–	–	Lost (2–6, 6–4, 3–6) at 2021 Australian Open
**(Switzerland) Belinda Bencic**	1–2	33%	1–2	–	–	Lost (6–4, 3–6, 5–7) at 2019 Hobart
(Slovakia) Dominika Cibulková	0–2	0%	–	0–2	–	Lost (6–2, 6–7^{(5–7)}, 1–6) at 2018 Strasbourg
**(France)** Caroline Garcia	0–2	0%	0–1	0–1	–	Lost (1–6, 2–6) at 2021 Miami
**(United States) Sofia Kenin**	0–1	0%	0–1	–	–	Lost (3–6, 0–6) at 2019 Dubai
Number 5 ranked players						
**(Latvia) Jeļena Ostapenko**	2–3	40%	1–1	1–0	0–2	Lost (4–6, 4–6) at 2019 Eastbourne
**(United States) Madison Keys**	0–1	0%	–	0–1	–	Lost (1–6, 4–6) at 2018 French Open
**(Italy) Sara Errani**	0–1	0%	–	0–1	–	Lost (6–3, 6–7^{(5–7)}, 2–6) at 2018 Charleston
Number 7 ranked players						
(Switzerland) Patty Schnyder	3–0	100%	–	3–0	–	Won (1–6, 6–2, 6–3) at 2017 Saint-Malo
Number 9 ranked players						
**(United States)** CoCo Vandeweghe	1–0	100%	1–0	–	–	Won (7–6^{(7–4)}, 6–7^{(5–7)}, 6–2) at 2021 Guadalajara
(Germany) Julia Görges	1–2	33%	0–1	1–1	–	Won (6–4, 3–6, 4–4, ret.) at 2019 Rome
**(Germany)** Andrea Petkovic	0–2	0%	0–1	0–1	–	Lost (3–6, 4–6) at 2019 US Open
Number 10 ranked players						
**(Russia) Daria Kasatkina**	0–2	0%	0–2	–	–	Lost (1–6, 1–6) at 2021 Melbourne
**(France) Kristina Mladenovic**	0–1	0%	0–1	–	–	Lost (7–5, 5–7, 2–6) at 2021 Lyon
**Total**	**17–50**	**25%**	**7–21 (25%)**	**7–20 (26%)**	**3–9 (25%)**	**last updated 23 December 2021**

=== Top 10 wins ===
Season	2018	Total
Wins	3	**3**

#	Player	Rank	Event	Surface	Rd	Score
**2018**
1.	(Latvia) Jeļena Ostapenko	No. 6	Qatar Ladies Open	Hard	2R	6–1, 6–3
2.	(Ukraine) Elina Svitolina	No. 4	French Open	Clay	3R	6–3, 7–5
3.	(Ukraine) Elina Svitolina	No. 5	Birmingham Classic, UK	Grass	QF	6–3, 6–2

== Junior Grand Slam tournament finals ==
=== Doubles: 1 (title) ===
Result	Year	Tournament	Surface	Partner	Opponents	Score
Win	2006	US Open	Hard	(Romania) Raluca Olaru	(Canada) Sharon Fichman (Russia) Anastasia Pavlyuchenkova	7–5, 6–2
