= Internationaux Féminins de la Vienne =

- 2025 Internationaux Féminins de la Vienne

Women's World Tennis Tour
- Event name: Poitiers
- Location: Poitiers, France
- Category: ITF Women's Circuit
- Surface: Hard (indoor)
- Draw: 32S/32Q/16D
- Prize money: $80,000
- Website: Official website

The Internationaux Féminins de la Vienne is a tournament for professional female tennis players played on indoor hard courts. The event is classified as a $80,000 ITF Women's Circuit tournament and has been held in Poitiers, France, since (at least) 1994 (with the exception of 2020).

== Past finals ==
=== Singles ===
Year	Champion	Runner-up	Score
2026	(Ukraine) Veronika Podrez	(France) Océane Dodin	6–3, 7–5
2025	(Ukraine) Veronika Podrez	(Portugal) Francisca Jorge	7–5, 2–6, 6–4
2024	(France) Léolia Jeanjean	(France) Diana Martynov	6–2, 6–3
2023	(France) Jessika Ponchet	(Germany) Anna-Lena Friedsam	3–6, 6–3, 7–6^{(7–2)}
2022	(Croatia) Petra Marčinko	(Belgium) Ysaline Bonaventure	6–3, 7–6^{(7–2)}
2021	(France) Chloé Paquet	(Switzerland) Simona Waltert	6–4, 6–3
2020	Cancelled due to the COVID-19 pandemic		
2019	(Serbia) Nina Stojanović	(Russia) Liudmila Samsonova	6–2, 7–6^{(7–2)}
2018	(Switzerland) Viktorija Golubic	(Russia) Natalia Vikhlyantseva	3–6, 6–1, 7–5
2017	(Romania) Mihaela Buzărnescu	(Belgium) Alison Van Uytvanck	6–4, 6–2
2016	(France) Océane Dodin	(United States) Lauren Davis	6–4, 6–2
2015	(Romania) Monica Niculescu	(France) Pauline Parmentier	7–5, 6–2
2014	(Hungary) Tímea Babos	(France) Océane Dodin	6–3, 4–6, 7–5
2013	(Belarus) Aliaksandra Sasnovich	(Sweden) Sofia Arvidsson	6–1, 5–7, 6–4
2012	(Puerto Rico) Monica Puig	(Russia) Elena Vesnina	7–5, 1–6, 7–5
2011	(Japan) Kimiko Date-Krumm	(United Kingdom) Elena Baltacha	7–6^{(7–3)}, 6–4
2010	(Sweden) Sofia Arvidsson	(France) Pauline Parmentier	6–2, 7–6^{(7–4)}
2009	(Australia) Jelena Dokić	(Sweden) Sofia Arvidsson	6–4, 6–4
2008	(Russia) Anastasia Pavlyuchenkova	(France) Julie Coin	6–4, 6–3
2007	(Poland) Marta Domachowska	(Russia) Anna Lapushchenkova	7–5, 6–0
2006	(France) Aravane Rezaï	(Croatia) Ivana Lisjak	7–6^{(7–0)}, 6–1
2005	(Ukraine) Viktoriya Kutuzova	(Estonia) Maret Ani	6–3, 3–6, 6–4
2004	(Belarus) Anastasiya Yakimova	(Switzerland) Marie-Gaïané Mikaelian	7–5, 6–2
2003	(Croatia) Karolina Šprem	(Italy) Roberta Vinci	6–4, 7–5
2002	(France) Marion Bartoli	(Netherlands) Seda Noorlander	6–1, 6–0
2001	(Hungary) Petra Mandula	(France) Émilie Loit	7–5, 2–6, 6–1
2000	(Slovakia) Ľudmila Cervanová	(Croatia) Iva Majoli	4–6, 6–3, 6–2
1999	(Czech Republic) Květa Hrdličková	(Switzerland) Marie-Gaïané Mikaelian	4–6, 6–4, 6–2
1998	(Federal Republic of Yugoslavia) Sandra Naćuk	(Russia) Elena Makarova	6–0, 5–7, 6–1
1997	(Netherlands) Kristie Boogert	(France) Amélie Cocheteux	6–4, 7–5
1996	(France) Noëlle van Lottum	(France) Amélie Cocheteux	1–6, 6–3, 6–2
1995	(Belarus) Olga Barabanschikova	(Ukraine) Elena Tatarkova	6–3, 6–1
1994	(Netherlands) Yvette Basting	(Netherlands) Kim de Weille	6–1, 5–7, 6–4

=== Doubles ===
Year	Champions	Runners-up	Score
2026	(Portugal) Francisca Jorge (Portugal) Matilde Jorge	(France) Estelle Cascino (China) Feng Shuo	6–2, 7–6^{(8–6)}
2025	(Czech Republic) Anna Sisková (Czech Republic) Vendula Valdmannová	(Poland) Anna Hertel (France) Tiphanie Lemaître	6–1, 6–4
2024	(Germany) Anna-Lena Friedsam (Switzerland) Céline Naef	(Poland) Martyna Kubka (Switzerland) Conny Perrin	6–4, 6–1
2023	(France) Jessika Ponchet (Netherlands) Bibiane Schoofs	Ekaterina Maklakova; Elena Pridankina	7–5, 6–4
2022	(Czech Republic) Miriam Kolodziejová (Czech Republic) Markéta Vondroušová	(France) Jessika Ponchet (Czech Republic) Renata Voráčová	6–4, 6–3
2021	(Georgia (country)) Mariam Bolkvadze (United Kingdom) Samantha Murray Sharan	(France) Audrey Albié (France) Léolia Jeanjean	7–6^{(7–5)}, 6–0
2020	Cancelled due to the COVID-19 pandemic		
2019	(France) Amandine Hesse (France) Harmony Tan	(Germany) Tayisiya Morderger (Germany) Yana Morderger	6–4, 6–2
2018	(Russia) Anna Blinkova (Russia) Alexandra Panova	(Switzerland) Viktorija Golubic (Netherlands) Arantxa Rus	6–1, 6–1
2017	(Switzerland) Belinda Bencic (Belgium) Yanina Wickmayer	(Romania) Mihaela Buzărnescu (Germany) Nicola Geuer	7–6^{(9–7)}, 6–3
2016	(Japan) Nao Hibino (Poland) Alicja Rosolska	(Romania) Alexandra Cadanțu (Germany) Nicola Geuer	6–0, 6–0
2015	(Romania) Andreea Mitu (Romania) Monica Niculescu	(France) Stéphanie Foretz (France) Amandine Hesse	6–7^{(5–7)}, 7–6^{(7–2)}, [10–8]
2014	(Czech Republic) Andrea Hlaváčková (Czech Republic) Lucie Hradecká	(Poland) Katarzyna Piter (Ukraine) Maryna Zanevska	6–1, 7–5
2013	(Czech Republic) Lucie Hradecká (Netherlands) Michaëlla Krajicek	(United States) Christina McHale (Romania) Monica Niculescu	7–6^{(7–5)}, 6–2
2012	(Colombia) Catalina Castaño (Bosnia and Herzegovina) Mervana Jugić-Salkić	(France) Stéphanie Foretz Gacon (Germany) Tatjana Malek	6–4, 5–7, [10–4]
2011	(France) Alizé Cornet (France) Virginie Razzano	(Russia) Maria Kondratieva (France) Sophie Lefèvre	6–3, 6–2
2010	(Czech Republic) Lucie Hradecká (Czech Republic) Renata Voráčová	(Uzbekistan) Akgul Amanmuradova (Germany) Kristina Barrois	6–7^{(5–7)}, 6–2, [10–5]
2009	(France) Julie Coin (Canada) Marie-Ève Pelletier	(Poland) Marta Domachowska (Netherlands) Michaëlla Krajicek	6–3, 3–6, [10–3]
2008	(Czech Republic) Petra Cetkovská (Czech Republic) Lucie Šafářová	(Uzbekistan) Akgul Amanmuradova (Romania) Monica Niculescu	6–4, 6–4
2007	(Russia) Alla Kudryavtseva (Russia) Anastasia Pavlyuchenkova	(Poland) Klaudia Jans (Poland) Alicja Rosolska	2–6, 6–4, [10–1]
2006	(Ukraine) Yuliya Beygelzimer (Ukraine) Yuliana Fedak	(Belarus) Darya Kustova (Belarus) Tatiana Poutchek	7–5, 6–3
2005	(Estonia) Maret Ani (Bosnia and Herzegovina) Mervana Jugić-Salkić	(Uzbekistan) Akgul Amanmuradova (Russia) Nina Bratchikova	7–6^{(7–0)}, 6–1
2004	(France) Stéphanie Cohen-Aloro (Tunisia) Selima Sfar	(Czech Republic) Gabriela Chmelinová (Czech Republic) Michaela Paštiková	7–5, 6–4
2003	(France) Caroline Dhenin (Germany) Bianka Lamade	(Ukraine) Yuliya Beygelzimer (Belarus) Tatiana Poutchek	7–5, 6–2
2002	(Bulgaria) Lubomira Bacheva (Russia) Evgenia Kulikovskaya	(France) Caroline Dhenin (France) Émilie Loit	w/o
2001	(Netherlands) Kristie Boogert (Belgium) Laurence Courtois	(Bulgaria) Lubomira Bacheva (Netherlands) Amanda Hopmans	6–1, 7–5
2000	(Netherlands) Yvette Basting (Hungary) Katalin Marosi	(Hungary) Petra Mandula (Austria) Patricia Wartusch	7–6^{(7–4)}, 6–1
1999	(Sweden) Åsa Carlsson (France) Émilie Loit	(France) Alexandra Fusai (Italy) Rita Grande	6–2, 7–6
1998	(Ukraine) Olga Lugina (Russia) Elena Makarova	(Germany) Gabriela Kučerová (Czech Republic) Radka Pelikánová	6–0, 6–1
1997	(Belgium) Nancy Feber (Czechoslovakia) Petra Píchalová-Langrová	(France) Lea Ghirardi (Bulgaria) Svetlana Krivencheva	3–6, 6–3, 6–1
1996	(Belarus) Olga Barabanschikova (India) Nirupama Vaidyanathan	(Netherlands) Anique Snijders (France) Noëlle van Lottum	6–2, 6–3
1995	(Germany) Kirstin Freye (Netherlands) Seda Noorlander	(Netherlands) Kim de Weille (Netherlands) Nathalie Thijssen	6–4, 6–4
1994	(Czech Republic) Ludmila Richterová (Czech Republic) Helena Vildová	(Federal Republic of Yugoslavia) Tatjana Ječmenica (Bulgaria) Svetlana Krivencheva	7–6, 6–1
