= Natalia Vikhlyantseva =

Russian tennis player

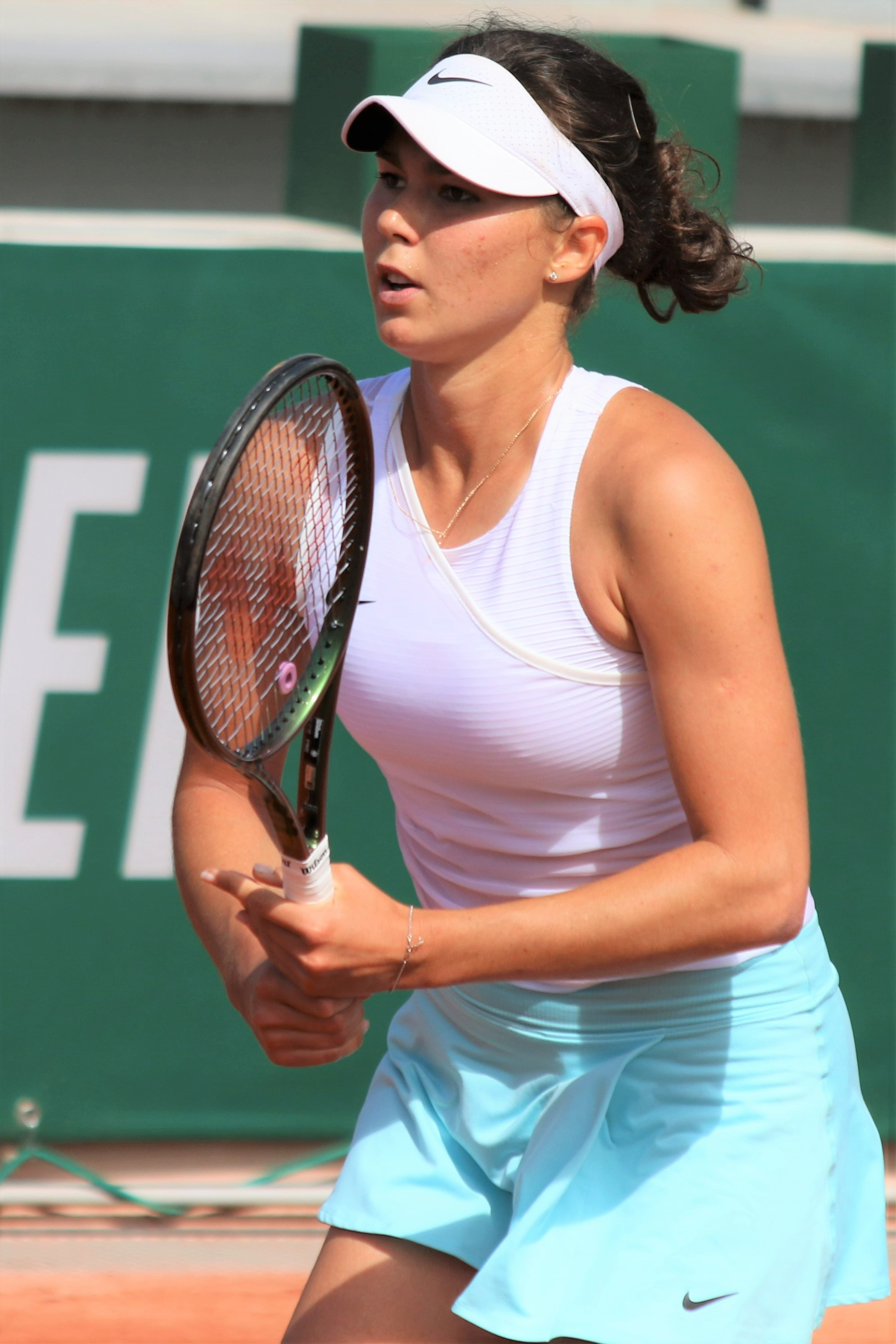
- Vikhlyantseva at the 2022 French Open
- Full name: Natalia Konstantinovna Vikhlyantseva
- Native name: Наталья Вихлянцева
- Country (sports): Russia
- Residence: Volgograd, Russia
- Born: 16 February 1997 (age 29) Volgograd
- Height: 1.85 m (6 ft 1 in)
- Retired: 2024
- Plays: Right (two handed-backhand)
- Coach: Krisjanis Stabins
- Prize money: US$ 1,426,250

Singles
- Career record: 224–176
- Career titles: 2 ITF
- Highest ranking: No. 54 (23 October 2017)

Grand Slam singles results
- Australian Open: 2R (2017, 2019)
- French Open: 1R (2017, 2018)
- Wimbledon: 1R (2017, 2018)
- US Open: 1R (2017, 2018, 2019)

Doubles
- Career record: 23–37
- Career titles: 1 WTA Challenger, 1 ITF
- Highest ranking: No. 216 (22 July 2019)

Grand Slam doubles results
- Australian Open: 1R (2018)
- French Open: 1R (2017)
- Wimbledon: 1R (2017)
- US Open: 1R (2017)

Team competitions
- Fed Cup: 6–1

Natalia Konstantinovna Vikhlyantseva (Russian: Наталья Константиновна Вихлянцева; born 16 February 1997) is a former Russian tennis player. Her favourite court surface is grass.

Vikhlyantseva has career-high rankings of 54 in singles, achieved on 23 October 2017, and 216 in doubles, reached in July 2019.

She has not played on the professional tour since August 2022. The ITIA listed her as a retired player on 23 June 2024.

== Tennis career ==
=== 2015–16 ===
Vikhlyantseva made her WTA Tour main-draw debut at the 2015 Shenzhen Open where she received a wildcard. In her first WTA match, she defeated Anna-Lena Friedsam, in three sets. She lost in the second round against Simona Halep, in straight sets.

After winning two titles in 2016 on the ITF Circuit, she reached the semifinals of the Open de Limoges where she took top-seeded top-30 player Caroline Garcia to three sets.

=== 2017: Top 100 debut and first WTA final ===
Vikhlyantseva debuted at a Grand Slam tournament at the 2017 Australian Open where she reached the second round of the main draw, losing to Anastasia Pavlyuchenkova. Her next tournament was the St. Petersburg Trophy for which she received a wildcard and beat Yaroslava Shvedova before upsetting No. 8 seed Daria Kasatkina in straight sets and receiving a walkover from top seed Simona Halep (who withdrew due to injury) in the quarterfinals. She lost in the semifinals to eventual champion Kristina Mladenovic. Despite her defeat, Vikhlyantseva ensured a top-100 debut with her campaign.

She reached her first WTA-level final at the Rosmalen Open, beating Cornelia Lister, former world No. 9 Andrea Petkovic, Arantxa Rus and fifth seed Ana Konjuh en route. She then lost to Anett Kontaveit.

After some poor results which followed, Vikhlyantseva reached the second round at the Stanford Classic and at the Linz Open before coming up with a surprise run to the semifinals of the Kremlin Cup, where she had her first ever top-20 win over compatriot Elena Vesnina in straight sets. It was Vikhlyantseva's second Premier semifinal of the year, and both of them came in Russia, her home country. However, her run was halted by Julia Görges in the semifinals, with a wrist injury hindering her from further success.

== Performance timelines ==
Key
W	F	SF	QF	#R	RR	Q#	P#	DNQ	A	Z#	PO	G	S	B	NMS	NTI	P	NH

(W) winner; (F) finalist; (SF) semifinalist; (QF) quarterfinalist; (#R) rounds 4, 3, 2, 1; (RR) round-robin stage; (Q#) qualification round; (P#) preliminary round; (DNQ) did not qualify; (A) absent; (Z#) Davis/Fed Cup Zonal Group (with number indication) or (PO) play-off; (G) gold, (S) silver or (B) bronze Olympic/Paralympic medal; (NMS) not a Masters tournament; (NTI) not a Tier I tournament; (P) postponed; (NH) not held; (SR) strike rate (events won / competed); (W–L) win–loss record.
To avoid confusion and double counting, these charts are updated at the conclusion of a tournament or when the player's participation has ended.

Only main-draw results in WTA Tour, Grand Slam tournaments, Fed Cup/Billie Jean King Cup and Olympic Games are included in win–loss records.

=== Singles ===
Current through the 2022 Prague Open.

Tournament	2015	2016	2017	2018	2019	2020	2021	2022	SR	W–L	Win %
Grand Slam tournaments
Australian Open	A	A	2R	1R	2R	Q3	Q1	A	0 / 3	2–3	40%
French Open	A	A	1R	1R	Q2	Q1	Q1	Q2	0 / 2	0–2	0%
Wimbledon	A	A	1R	1R	Q2	NH	Q1	A (Note: Suspended due to the Russian invasion of Ukraine.)	0 / 2	0–2	0%
US Open	A	Q1	1R	1R	1R	1R	Q1	A	0 / 4	0–4	0%
Win–loss	0–0	0–0	1–4	0–4	1–2	0–1	0–0	0–0	0 / 11	2–11	15%
WTA 1000
Qatar / Dubai Open (Note: The first Premier 5 event of the year has switched back and forth between the Dubai Tennis Championships and the Qatar Ladies Open since 2009. Dubai was classified as a Premier 5 event from 2009 to 2011 before being succeeded by Doha for the 2012–2014 period. In 2015, Dubai regained its Premier 5 status while Doha was demoted to Premier status. The Premier 5 tournaments were reclassified as WTA 1000 tournaments in 2021.)	A	A	Q2	A	A	Q1	Q1	A	0 / 0	0–0	–
Indian Wells Open	A	A	Q1	2R	3R	NH	Q1	A	0 / 2	3–2	60%
Miami Open	1R	A	1R	2R	1R	NH	A	A	0 / 4	1–4	20%
Madrid Open	A	A	Q1	1R	A	NH	A	A	0 / 1	0–1	0%
Italian Open	A	A	Q1	1R	A	A	A	A	0 /1	0–1	0%
Canadian Open	A	A	Q1	A	A	NH	A		0 / 0	0–0	–
Cincinnati Open	A	A	2R	Q2	A	A	A		0 / 1	1–1	50%
Wuhan Open	A	A	Q2	A	A	NH			0 / 0	0–0	–
China Open	A	A	1R	A	A	NH			0 / 1	0–1	0%
Career statistics
Tournaments	2	2	15	20	10	1	5	1	Career total: 56		
Titles	0	0	0	0	0	0	0	0	Career total: 0		
Finals	0	0	1	0	0	0	0	0	Career total: 1		
Overall win–loss	1–2	1–2	15–15	6–20	10–10	0–1	3–5	0–1	0 / 56	36–56	39%
Year-end ranking	230	161	54	134	112	145	240	303	$1,376,832		

=== Doubles ===
Tournament	2017	2018	...	2022	SR	W–L	Win %
Grand Slam tournaments
Australian Open	A	1R		A	0 / 1	0–1	0%
French Open	1R	A		A	0 / 1	0–1	0%
Wimbledon	1R	A		A	0 / 1	0–1	0%
US Open	1R	A		A	0 / 1	0–1	0%
Win–loss	0–3	0–1		0–0	0 / 4	0–4	0%
WTA 1000
Qatar / Dubai Open	1R	A		A	0 / 1	0–1	0%

== WTA Tour finals ==
=== Singles: 1 (runner-up) ===
Legend Grand Slam WTA 1000 WTA 500 WTA 250 (0–1)	Finals by surface Hard (0–0) Clay (0–0) Grass (0–1) Carpet (0–0)

Result	W–L	Date	Tournament	Tier	Surface	Opponent	Score
Loss	0–1	Jun 2017	Rosmalen Open, Netherlands	International (Note: The WTA International tournaments were reclassified as WTA 250 tournaments in 2021.)	Grass	(Estonia) Anett Kontaveit	2–6, 3–6

== WTA Challenger finals ==
=== Doubles: 1 (title) ===
Result	W–L	Date	Tournament	Surface	Partner	Opponents	Score
Win	1–0	Mar 2019	Båstad Open, Sweden	Clay	(Japan) Misaki Doi	(Chile) Alexa Guarachi (Montenegro) Danka Kovinić	7–5, 6–7^{(4–7)}, [10–7]

== ITF Circuit finals ==
=== Singles: 6 (2 titles, 4 runner-ups) ===
Legend $100,000 tournaments $80,000 tournaments $25,000 tournaments $10,000 tournaments	Finals by surface Hard (1–2) Clay (1–2)

Result	W–L	Date	Tournament	Tier	Surface	Opponent	Score
Loss	0–1	Oct 2014	ITF Hilton Head, United States	10,000	Clay	(Czech Republic) Marie Bouzková	5–7, 1–6
Loss	0–2	Aug 2015	Neva Cup St. Petersburg, Russia	25,000	Clay	(Russia) Polina Leykina	4–6, 3–6
Win	1–2	Aug 2016	ITF Plzeň, Czech Republic	25,000	Clay	(Russia) Anna Kalinskaya	6–1, 6–3
Win	2–2	Sep 2016	Neva Cup St. Petersburg, Russia	100,000	Hard (i)	(Croatia) Donna Vekić	6–1, 6–2
Loss	2–3	Dec 2016	Dubai Tennis Challenge, U.A.E.	100,000	Hard	(Chinese Taipei) Hsieh Su-wei	2–6, 2–6
Loss	2–4	Oct 2018	Internationaux de Poitiers, France	80,000	Hard (i)	(Switzerland) Viktorija Golubic	6–3, 1–6, 5–7

=== Doubles: 2 (1 title, 1 runner-up) ===
Legend $50,000 tournaments $25,000 tournaments	Finals by surface Hard (0–0) Clay (1–1)

Result	W–L	Date	Tournament	Tier	Surface	Partner	Opponents	Score
Loss	0–1	Sep 2015	Open de Saint-Malo, France	50,000	Clay	(Russia) Maria Marfutina	(Slovakia) Kristína Kučová (Latvia) Anastasija Sevastova	7–6^{(1)}, 3–6, [5–10]
Win	1–1	Jan 2016	ITF Wesley Chapel, US	25,000	Clay	(United States) Ingrid Neel	(Russia) Natela Dzalamidze (Russia) Veronika Kudermetova	4–6, 7–6^{(4)}, [10–6]

== Fed Cup/Billie Jean King Cup participation ==
This table is current through the 2019 Fed Cup

Legend
World Group / Zone Group Round Robin

=== Singles (5–1) ===
Edition	Round	Date	Location	Against	Surface	Opponent	W/L	Result
2017	WG2	Feb 2017	Moscow (RUS)	Chinese Taipei	Hard (i)	Lee Ya-hsuan	W	6–1, 6–2
2018	WG2	Feb 2018	Bratislava (SVK)	Slovakia	Hard (i)	Viktória Kužmová	W	6–4, 6–2
2018	WG2	Feb 2018	Bratislava (SVK)	Slovakia	Hard (i)	Jana Čepelová	L	4–6, 4–6
2019	Z1 RR	Feb 2019	Zielona Góra (POL)	Poland	Hard (i)	Iga Świątek	W	6–0, 6–2
2019	Z1 RR	Feb 2019	Zielona Góra (POL)	Denmark	Hard (i)	Clara Tauson	W	7–6^{(7–3)}, 6–1
2019	Z1 RR	Feb 2019	Zielona Góra (POL)	Sweden	Hard (i)	Johanna Larsson	W	7–6^{(7–1)}, 6–2
