= 2018 ITF Women's Circuit (January–March) =

International tennis tournament series

The 2018 ITF Women's Circuit is the 2018 edition of the second tier tour for women's professional tennis. It is organised by the International Tennis Federation and is a tier below the WTA Tour. The ITF Women's Circuit includes tournaments with prize money ranging from $15,000 up to $100,000.

== Key ==
Category
$100,000 tournaments
$80,000 tournaments
$60,000 tournaments
$25,000 tournaments
$15,000 tournaments

== Month ==
=== January ===
Week of	Tournament	Winner	Runners-up	Semifinalists	Quarterfinalists
January 1	City of Playford Tennis International; Playford, Australia; Hard $25,000; Singles and doubles draws	(Australia) Zoe Hives; 6–4, 5–7, 7–6^{(7–4)}	(Australia) Alexandra Bozovic	(Czech Republic) Marie Bouzková (France) Jessika Ponchet	(Russia) Vera Zvonareva (Canada) Bianca Andreescu (Germany) Anna-Lena Friedsam (Greece) Valentini Grammatikopoulou
January 1	City of Playford Tennis International; Playford, Australia; Hard $25,000; Singles and doubles draws	(Slovenia) Dalila Jakupović (Russia) Irina Khromacheva; 2–6, 7–5, [10–5]	(Japan) Junri Namigata (Japan) Erika Sema	(Czech Republic) Marie Bouzková (France) Jessika Ponchet	(Russia) Vera Zvonareva (Canada) Bianca Andreescu (Germany) Anna-Lena Friedsam (Greece) Valentini Grammatikopoulou
January 1	ITF Women's Circuit – Hong Kong; Hong Kong; Hard $15,000; Singles and doubles draws	(Chinese Taipei) Lee Ya-hsuan; 6–4, 6–4	(Japan) Hiroko Kuwata	(China) Ni Ma Zhuoma (Japan) Yuuki Tanaka	(Thailand) Luksika Kumkhum (Japan) Mai Hontama (Hong Kong) Ng Kwan-yau (Japan) Risa Ushijima
January 1	ITF Women's Circuit – Hong Kong; Hong Kong; Hard $15,000; Singles and doubles draws	(United States) Yuki Kristina Chiang (Belgium) Hélène Scholsen; 6–2, 6–3	(Chinese Taipei) Chen Pei-hsuan (Chinese Taipei) Wu Fang-hsien	(China) Ni Ma Zhuoma (Japan) Yuuki Tanaka	(Thailand) Luksika Kumkhum (Japan) Mai Hontama (Hong Kong) Ng Kwan-yau (Japan) Risa Ushijima
January 8	Daytona Beach, United States; Clay $25,000; Singles and doubles draws	(Ukraine) Anhelina Kalinina; 1–6, 7–5, 6–0	(United States) Grace Min	(Kazakhstan) Anna Danilina (Moldova) Alexandra Perper	(United States) Jessica Pegula (United States) Sophie Chang (Canada) Katherine Sebov (Japan) Mari Osaka
January 8	Daytona Beach, United States; Clay $25,000; Singles and doubles draws	(United States) Usue Maitane Arconada (Chile) Alexa Guarachi; 6–3, 6–4	(Norway) Ulrikke Eikeri (Belarus) Ilona Kremen	(Kazakhstan) Anna Danilina (Moldova) Alexandra Perper	(United States) Jessica Pegula (United States) Sophie Chang (Canada) Katherine Sebov (Japan) Mari Osaka
January 8	Fort-de-France, Martinique, France; Hard $15,000; Singles and doubles draws	(Switzerland) Leonie Küng; 6–4, 2–6, 6–4	(United Kingdom) Emily Appleton	(France) Priscilla Heise (United States) Salma Ewing	(France) Théo Gravouil (France) Irina Ramialison (United States) Lauren Marker (United States) Caty McNally
January 8	Fort-de-France, Martinique, France; Hard $15,000; Singles and doubles draws	(United States) Rasheeda McAdoo (United States) Amy Zhu; 7–5, 7–6^{(7–5)}	(United Kingdom) Emily Appleton (United States) Caty McNally	(France) Priscilla Heise (United States) Salma Ewing	(France) Théo Gravouil (France) Irina Ramialison (United States) Lauren Marker (United States) Caty McNally
January 8	Hammamet, Tunisia; Clay $15,000; Singles and doubles draws	(France) Sara Cakarevic; 6–2, 7–6^{(7–4)}	(Romania) Ioana Loredana Roșca	(Romania) Irina Fetecău (Chinese Taipei) Hsu Chieh-yu	(Italy) Camilla Rosatello (Greece) Despina Papamichail (Switzerland) Karin Kennel (France) Victoria Muntean
January 8	Hammamet, Tunisia; Clay $15,000; Singles and doubles draws	(Chinese Taipei) Hsu Chieh-yu (France) Victoria Muntean; 3–6, 7–5, [10–5]	(Russia) Maria Marfutina (Romania) Ioana Loredana Roșca	(Romania) Irina Fetecău (Chinese Taipei) Hsu Chieh-yu	(Italy) Camilla Rosatello (Greece) Despina Papamichail (Switzerland) Karin Kennel (France) Victoria Muntean
January 8	Antalya, Turkey; Clay $15,000; Singles and doubles draws	(Romania) Andreea Amalia Roșca; 7–6^{(8–6)}, 6–4	(Czech Republic) Miriam Kolodziejová	(Georgia (country)) Ekaterine Gorgodze (Georgia (country)) Sofia Shapatava	(Germany) Tayisiya Morderger (Ukraine) Anastasiya Vasylyeva (Turkey) İpek Öz (Germany) Lisa Matviyenko
January 8	Antalya, Turkey; Clay $15,000; Singles and doubles draws	(Georgia (country)) Sofia Shapatava (Ukraine) Anastasiya Vasylyeva; 5–7, 6–0, [13–11]	(Turkey) İpek Öz (Kyrgyzstan) Ksenia Palkina	(Georgia (country)) Ekaterine Gorgodze (Georgia (country)) Sofia Shapatava	(Germany) Tayisiya Morderger (Ukraine) Anastasiya Vasylyeva (Turkey) İpek Öz (Germany) Lisa Matviyenko
January 15	Orlando, United States; Clay $25,000; Singles and doubles draws	(Ukraine) Anhelina Kalinina; 6–2, 3–6, 7–5	(Austria) Julia Grabher	(United States) Jessica Pegula (Japan) Ayano Shimizu	(United States) Caitlin Whoriskey (Japan) Kyōka Okamura (United States) Chiara Scholl (United States) Grace Min
January 15	Orlando, United States; Clay $25,000; Singles and doubles draws	(China) Guo Hanyu (Chinese Taipei) Hsu Ching-wen; 6–3, 3–6, [12–10]	(Norway) Ulrikke Eikeri (Belarus) Ilona Kremen	(United States) Jessica Pegula (Japan) Ayano Shimizu	(United States) Caitlin Whoriskey (Japan) Kyōka Okamura (United States) Chiara Scholl (United States) Grace Min
January 15	Sharm El Sheikh, Egypt; Hard $15,000; Singles and doubles draws	(Belarus) Yuliya Hatouka; 6–4, 4–6, 7–5	(Russia) Anastasia Potapova	(Slovenia) Nastja Kolar (Japan) Kumi So	(Poland) Katarzyna Kawa (United Kingdom) Harriet Dart (Austria) Melanie Klaffner (Serbia) Dejana Radanović
January 15	Sharm El Sheikh, Egypt; Hard $15,000; Singles and doubles draws	(New Zealand) Jade Lewis (New Zealand) Erin Routliffe; 0–6, 7–5, [10–6]	(Russia) Anastasia Potapova (Russia) Ekaterina Yashina	(Slovenia) Nastja Kolar (Japan) Kumi So	(Poland) Katarzyna Kawa (United Kingdom) Harriet Dart (Austria) Melanie Klaffner (Serbia) Dejana Radanović
January 15	Petit-Bourg, Guadeloupe, France; Hard $15,000; Singles and doubles draws	(France) Irina Ramialison; 6–3, 7–5	(Switzerland) Leonie Küng	(France) Priscilla Heise (United Kingdom) Emily Appleton	(United States) Amy Zhu (Slovakia) Zuzana Zlochová (France) Théo Gravouil (United States) Caty McNally
January 15	Petit-Bourg, Guadeloupe, France; Hard $15,000; Singles and doubles draws	(United Kingdom) Emily Appleton (United States) Caty McNally; 6–3, 6–0	(United States) Shelby Talcott (United States) Amy Zhu	(France) Priscilla Heise (United Kingdom) Emily Appleton	(United States) Amy Zhu (Slovakia) Zuzana Zlochová (France) Théo Gravouil (United States) Caty McNally
January 15	Hammamet, Tunisia; Clay $15,000; Singles and doubles draws	(Argentina) Catalina Pella; 6–4, 6–7^{(5–7)}, 6–4	(Italy) Michele Alexandra Zmău	(Switzerland) Karin Kennel (Chinese Taipei) Hsu Chieh-yu	(Serbia) Natalija Kostić (Greece) Despina Papamichail (Italy) Lucrezia Stefanini (Russia) Maria Marfutina
January 15	Hammamet, Tunisia; Clay $15,000; Singles and doubles draws	(Switzerland) Karin Kennel (Russia) Maria Marfutina; 7–5, 6–2	(Greece) Despina Papamichail (Argentina) Catalina Pella	(Switzerland) Karin Kennel (Chinese Taipei) Hsu Chieh-yu	(Serbia) Natalija Kostić (Greece) Despina Papamichail (Italy) Lucrezia Stefanini (Russia) Maria Marfutina
January 15	Antalya, Turkey; Clay $15,000; Singles and doubles draws	(Russia) Varvara Gracheva; 7–5, 6–0	(Georgia (country)) Sofia Shapatava	(Russia) Ekaterina Vishnevskaya (Belarus) Nika Shytkouskaya	(South Korea) Kim Da-bin (Czech Republic) Miriam Kolodziejová (Romania) Andreea Amalia Roșca (Germany) Lisa Matviyenko
January 15	Antalya, Turkey; Clay $15,000; Singles and doubles draws	(Romania) Oana Gavrilă (Romania) Andreea Amalia Roșca; 6–4, 6–2	(Turkey) İpek Öz (Russia) Ekaterina Vishnevskaya	(Russia) Ekaterina Vishnevskaya (Belarus) Nika Shytkouskaya	(South Korea) Kim Da-bin (Czech Republic) Miriam Kolodziejová (Romania) Andreea Amalia Roșca (Germany) Lisa Matviyenko
January 22	Open Andrézieux-Bouthéon 42; Andrézieux-Bouthéon, France; Hard (indoor) $60,000; Singles – Doubles	(Spain) Georgina García Pérez; 6–2, 6–0	(Netherlands) Arantxa Rus	(France) Fiona Ferro (Poland) Magdalena Fręch	(Netherlands) Bibiane Schoofs (Germany) Tamara Korpatsch (Russia) Vitalia Diatchenko (France) Audrey Albié
January 22	Open Andrézieux-Bouthéon 42; Andrézieux-Bouthéon, France; Hard (indoor) $60,000; Singles – Doubles	(Belgium) Ysaline Bonaventure (Netherlands) Bibiane Schoofs; 4–6, 7–5, [10–7]	(Italy) Camilla Rosatello (Belgium) Kimberley Zimmermann	(France) Fiona Ferro (Poland) Magdalena Fręch	(Netherlands) Bibiane Schoofs (Germany) Tamara Korpatsch (Russia) Vitalia Diatchenko (France) Audrey Albié
January 22	Wesley Chapel, United States; Clay $25,000; Singles and doubles draws	(United States) Francesca Di Lorenzo; 6–2, 1–6, 6–4	(United States) Whitney Osuigwe	(Serbia) Olga Danilović (Romania) Irina Bara	(Ukraine) Anhelina Kalinina (Ukraine) Olga Ianchuk (United Kingdom) Katie Swan (United States) Maria Sanchez
January 22	Wesley Chapel, United States; Clay $25,000; Singles and doubles draws	(Norway) Ulrikke Eikeri (Belarus) Ilona Kremen; 6–2, 6–3	(Chinese Taipei) Hsu Ching-wen (China) Zheng Wushuang	(Serbia) Olga Danilović (Romania) Irina Bara	(Ukraine) Anhelina Kalinina (Ukraine) Olga Ianchuk (United Kingdom) Katie Swan (United States) Maria Sanchez
January 22	Sharm El Sheikh, Egypt; Hard $15,000; Singles and doubles draws	(Poland) Katarzyna Kawa; 6–2, 4–6, 6–2	(China) Zhang Kailin	(Japan) Mai Hontama (Serbia) Dejana Radanović	(Belgium) Greet Minnen (India) Kanika Vaidya (Belarus) Shalimar Talbi (Netherlands) Nina Kruijer
January 22	Sharm El Sheikh, Egypt; Hard $15,000; Singles and doubles draws	(New Zealand) Jade Lewis (New Zealand) Erin Routliffe; 6–1, 5–7, [12–10]	(Turkey) Berfu Cengiz (Bosnia and Herzegovina) Jasmina Tinjić	(Japan) Mai Hontama (Serbia) Dejana Radanović	(Belgium) Greet Minnen (India) Kanika Vaidya (Belarus) Shalimar Talbi (Netherlands) Nina Kruijer
January 22	Stuttgart, Germany; Hard (indoor) $15,000; Singles and doubles draws	(Czech Republic) Jesika Malečková; 6–2, 6–0	(Russia) Ekaterina Kazionova	(Germany) Stephanie Wagner (Germany) Katharina Hobgarski	(Australia) Nina Alibalić (Switzerland) Ylena In-Albon (Romania) Laura-Ioana Andrei (Switzerland) Tess Sugnaux
January 22	Stuttgart, Germany; Hard (indoor) $15,000; Singles and doubles draws	(Romania) Laura-Ioana Andrei (Romania) Raluca Georgiana Șerban; 6–0, 6–7^{(7–9)}, [10–5]	(Czech Republic) Petra Krejsová (Czech Republic) Jesika Malečková	(Germany) Stephanie Wagner (Germany) Katharina Hobgarski	(Australia) Nina Alibalić (Switzerland) Ylena In-Albon (Romania) Laura-Ioana Andrei (Switzerland) Tess Sugnaux
January 22	Hammamet, Tunisia; Clay $15,000; Singles and doubles draws	(Russia) Maria Marfutina; 6–2, 6–1	(Italy) Lucrezia Stefanini	(Italy) Michele Alexandra Zmău (Croatia) Lea Bošković	(Argentina) Catalina Pella (Greece) Despina Papamichail (Switzerland) Jessica Crivelletto (France) Victoria Muntean
January 22	Hammamet, Tunisia; Clay $15,000; Singles and doubles draws	(Switzerland) Karin Kennel (Russia) Maria Marfutina; 6–4, 6–3	(Serbia) Natalija Kostić (Bosnia and Herzegovina) Jelena Simić	(Italy) Michele Alexandra Zmău (Croatia) Lea Bošković	(Argentina) Catalina Pella (Greece) Despina Papamichail (Switzerland) Jessica Crivelletto (France) Victoria Muntean
January 22	Antalya, Turkey; Clay $15,000; Singles and doubles draws	(Luxembourg) Eléonora Molinaro; 6–3, 6–1	(Russia) Vlada Koval	(Russia) Ekaterina Vishnevskaya (Germany) Lisa Matviyenko	(Belarus) Nika Shytkouskaya (Russia) Aleksandra Pospelova (Germany) Yana Morderger (Austria) Caroline Ilowska
January 22	Antalya, Turkey; Clay $15,000; Singles and doubles draws	(Russia) Aleksandra Pospelova (Georgia (country)) Sofia Shapatava; 6–2, 6–2	(Germany) Tayisiya Morderger (Germany) Yana Morderger	(Russia) Ekaterina Vishnevskaya (Germany) Lisa Matviyenko	(Belarus) Nika Shytkouskaya (Russia) Aleksandra Pospelova (Germany) Yana Morderger (Austria) Caroline Ilowska
January 29	Dow Tennis Classic; Midland, United States; Hard (indoor) $100,000; Singles – Doubles	(United States) Madison Brengle; 6–1, 6–2	(United States) Jamie Loeb	(Romania) Mihaela Buzărnescu (United States) Jennifer Brady	(Sweden) Rebecca Peterson (Russia) Evgeniya Rodina (Canada) Carol Zhao (Canada) Bianca Andreescu
January 29	Dow Tennis Classic; Midland, United States; Hard (indoor) $100,000; Singles – Doubles	(United States) Kaitlyn Christian (United States) Sabrina Santamaria; 7–5, 4–6, [10–8]	(United States) Jessica Pegula (United States) Maria Sanchez	(Romania) Mihaela Buzărnescu (United States) Jennifer Brady	(Sweden) Rebecca Peterson (Russia) Evgeniya Rodina (Canada) Carol Zhao (Canada) Bianca Andreescu
January 29	Burnie International; Burnie, Australia; Hard $60,000; Singles – Doubles	(Ukraine) Marta Kostyuk; 6–4, 6–3	(Switzerland) Viktorija Golubic	(Australia) Olivia Rogowska (Australia) Zoe Hives	(Romania) Alexandra Dulgheru (Australia) Destanee Aiava (Romania) Jaqueline Cristian (China) Wang Xiyu
January 29	Burnie International; Burnie, Australia; Hard $60,000; Singles – Doubles	(United States) Vania King (United Kingdom) Laura Robson; 7–6^{(7–3)}, 6–1	(Japan) Momoko Kobori (Japan) Chihiro Muramatsu	(Australia) Olivia Rogowska (Australia) Zoe Hives	(Romania) Alexandra Dulgheru (Australia) Destanee Aiava (Romania) Jaqueline Cristian (China) Wang Xiyu
January 29	GB Pro-Series Glasgow; Glasgow, United Kingdom; Hard (indoor) $25,000; Singles and doubles draws	(Spain) Paula Badosa Gibert; 2–6, 6–1, 6–3	(United Kingdom) Maia Lumsden	(France) Chloé Paquet (Spain) Georgina García Pérez	(Italy) Camilla Rosatello (France) Sara Cakarevic (Czech Republic) Tereza Smitková (Belgium) Ysaline Bonaventure
January 29	GB Pro-Series Glasgow; Glasgow, United Kingdom; Hard (indoor) $25,000; Singles and doubles draws	(Belgium) Ysaline Bonaventure (Greece) Valentini Grammatikopoulou; 7–5, 6–4	(Hungary) Dalma Gálfi (Poland) Katarzyna Piter	(France) Chloé Paquet (Spain) Georgina García Pérez	(Italy) Camilla Rosatello (France) Sara Cakarevic (Czech Republic) Tereza Smitková (Belgium) Ysaline Bonaventure
January 29	Sharm El Sheikh, Egypt; Hard $15,000; Singles and doubles draws	(New Zealand) Erin Routliffe; 6–3, 7–5	(United States) Nadja Gilchrist	(China) Ma Yexin (Japan) Kumi So	(Belarus) Shalimar Talbi (Belgium) Hélène Scholsen (Turkey) Berfu Cengiz (China) Gai Ao
January 29	Sharm El Sheikh, Egypt; Hard $15,000; Singles and doubles draws	(Poland) Katarzyna Kawa (United Kingdom) Emily Webley-Smith; 6–3, 3–6, [10–5]	(Romania) Laura-Ioana Andrei (Belgium) Hélène Scholsen	(China) Ma Yexin (Japan) Kumi So	(Belarus) Shalimar Talbi (Belgium) Hélène Scholsen (Turkey) Berfu Cengiz (China) Gai Ao
January 29	Hammamet, Tunisia; Clay $15,000; Singles and doubles draws	(Egypt) Sandra Samir; 6–3, 6–3	(Bosnia and Herzegovina) Nefisa Berberović	(Switzerland) Karin Kennel (Bosnia and Herzegovina) Jelena Simić	(Venezuela) Andrea Gámiz (Serbia) Natalija Kostić (Russia) Nika Kukharchuk (Netherlands) Cindy Burger
January 29	Hammamet, Tunisia; Clay $15,000; Singles and doubles draws	(Serbia) Natalija Kostić (Bosnia and Herzegovina) Jelena Simić; Walkover	(Venezuela) Andrea Gámiz (Argentina) Guadalupe Pérez Rojas	(Switzerland) Karin Kennel (Bosnia and Herzegovina) Jelena Simić	(Venezuela) Andrea Gámiz (Serbia) Natalija Kostić (Russia) Nika Kukharchuk (Netherlands) Cindy Burger
January 29	Antalya, Turkey; Hard $15,000; Singles and doubles draws	(Canada) Rebecca Marino; 6–3, 6–3	(Romania) Cristina Ene	(Russia) Anastasia Kulikova (Greece) Despina Papamichail	(Romania) Nicoleta Dascălu (United States) Shelby Talcott (Slovakia) Natália Vajdová (Japan) Chisa Hosonuma
January 29	Antalya, Turkey; Hard $15,000; Singles and doubles draws	(Romania) Elena Bogdan (Romania) Cristina Ene; 6–4, 6–3	(Japan) Haruna Arakawa (South Korea) Kim Da-bin	(Russia) Anastasia Kulikova (Greece) Despina Papamichail	(Romania) Nicoleta Dascălu (United States) Shelby Talcott (Slovakia) Natália Vajdová (Japan) Chisa Hosonuma

=== February ===
Week of	Tournament	Winner	Runners-up	Semifinalists	Quarterfinalists
February 5	Launceston International; Launceston, Australia; Hard $25,000; Singles and doubles draws	(United Kingdom) Gabriella Taylor; 6–3, 6–4	(United States) Asia Muhammad	(Australia) Zoe Hives (Russia) Irina Khromacheva	(Japan) Shuko Aoyama (France) Myrtille Georges (Australia) Alexandra Bozovic (United Kingdom) Laura Robson
February 5	Launceston International; Launceston, Australia; Hard $25,000; Singles and doubles draws	(Australia) Jessica Moore (Australia) Ellen Perez; 7–6^{(7–5)}, 6–4	(United Kingdom) Laura Robson (Russia) Valeria Savinykh	(Australia) Zoe Hives (Russia) Irina Khromacheva	(Japan) Shuko Aoyama (France) Myrtille Georges (Australia) Alexandra Bozovic (United Kingdom) Laura Robson
February 5	Grenoble, France; Hard (indoor) $25,000; Singles and doubles draws	(France) Fiona Ferro; 6–4, 6–7^{(5–7)}, 7–6^{(7–3)}	(Luxembourg) Eléonora Molinaro	(Russia) Marina Melnikova (Romania) Elena-Gabriela Ruse	(Germany) Tamara Korpatsch (France) Audrey Albié (France) Shérazad Reix (France) Chloé Paquet
February 5	Grenoble, France; Hard (indoor) $25,000; Singles and doubles draws	(Switzerland) Amra Sadiković (Netherlands) Eva Wacanno; 4–6, 6–1, [10–6]	(France) Estelle Cascino (France) Elixane Lechemia	(Russia) Marina Melnikova (Romania) Elena-Gabriela Ruse	(Germany) Tamara Korpatsch (France) Audrey Albié (France) Shérazad Reix (France) Chloé Paquet
February 5	GB Pro-Series Loughborough; Loughborough, United Kingdom; Hard (indoor) $25,000; Singles and doubles draws	(Czech Republic) Tereza Smitková; 6–3, 6–2	(Switzerland) Conny Perrin	(Liechtenstein) Kathinka von Deichmann (Spain) Olga Sáez Larra	(United Kingdom) Eden Silva (Hungary) Panna Udvardy (Italy) Cristiana Ferrando (Czech Republic) Jesika Malečková
February 5	GB Pro-Series Loughborough; Loughborough, United Kingdom; Hard (indoor) $25,000; Singles and doubles draws	(Netherlands) Michaëlla Krajicek (Netherlands) Bibiane Schoofs; 6–7^{(5–7)}, 6–1, [10–6]	(United Kingdom) Tara Moore (Switzerland) Conny Perrin	(Liechtenstein) Kathinka von Deichmann (Spain) Olga Sáez Larra	(United Kingdom) Eden Silva (Hungary) Panna Udvardy (Italy) Cristiana Ferrando (Czech Republic) Jesika Malečková
February 5	Sharm El Sheikh, Egypt; Hard $15,000; Singles and doubles draws	(Romania) Laura-Ioana Andrei; 6–3, 6–1	(Russia) Anna Pribylova	(Russia) Anastasia Pribylova (Switzerland) Susan Bandecchi	(Russia) Anna Morgina (China) Gai Ao (Italy) Lucia Bronzetti (Italy) Alice Matteucci
February 5	Sharm El Sheikh, Egypt; Hard $15,000; Singles and doubles draws	(Russia) Anastasia Pribylova (United Kingdom) Emily Webley-Smith; 6–3, 6–3	(Romania) Laura-Ioana Andrei (Germany) Julia Kimmelmann	(Russia) Anastasia Pribylova (Switzerland) Susan Bandecchi	(Russia) Anna Morgina (China) Gai Ao (Italy) Lucia Bronzetti (Italy) Alice Matteucci
February 5	Trnava, Slovakia; Hard (indoor) $15,000; Singles and doubles draws	(Moldova) Anastasia Dețiuc; 5–7, 6–0, 6–3	(Russia) Sofya Lansere	(Czech Republic) Pernilla Mendesová (Russia) Elena Rybakina	(Slovakia) Timea Jarušková (Czech Republic) Johana Marková (Hungary) Ágnes Bukta (Germany) Vivian Heisen
February 5	Trnava, Slovakia; Hard (indoor) $15,000; Singles and doubles draws	(Poland) Paulina Czarnik (Poland) Daria Kuczer; 6–3, 7–5	(Moldova) Anastasia Dețiuc (Czech Republic) Johana Marková	(Czech Republic) Pernilla Mendesová (Russia) Elena Rybakina	(Slovakia) Timea Jarušková (Czech Republic) Johana Marková (Hungary) Ágnes Bukta (Germany) Vivian Heisen
February 5	Manacor, Spain; Clay $15,000; Singles and doubles draws	(Spain) Marina Bassols Ribera; 6–1, 6–4	(Russia) Marta Paigina	(Germany) Lisa Ponomar (Germany) Katharina Gerlach	(Japan) Naho Sato (Moldova) Alexandra Perper (Australia) Seone Mendez (Spain) Rosa Vicens Mas
February 5	Manacor, Spain; Clay $15,000; Singles and doubles draws	(Japan) Yukina Saigo (Japan) Naho Sato; 3–6, 7–5, [10–8]	(Moldova) Alexandra Perper (Germany) Lisa Ponomar	(Germany) Lisa Ponomar (Germany) Katharina Gerlach	(Japan) Naho Sato (Moldova) Alexandra Perper (Australia) Seone Mendez (Spain) Rosa Vicens Mas
February 5	Hammamet, Tunisia; Clay $15,000; Singles and doubles draws	(Germany) Natalia Siedliska; 3–6, 6–3, 6–3	(Italy) Angelica Moratelli	(Brazil) Laura Pigossi (Serbia) Natalija Kostić	(Bosnia and Herzegovina) Jelena Simić (Argentina) Guadalupe Pérez Rojas (Italy) Nastassja Burnett (Egypt) Sandra Samir
February 5	Hammamet, Tunisia; Clay $15,000; Singles and doubles draws	(Germany) Nora Niedmers (Germany) Natalia Siedliska; 7–6^{(9–7)}, 0–6, [10–6]	(Serbia) Natalija Kostić (Bosnia and Herzegovina) Jelena Simić	(Brazil) Laura Pigossi (Serbia) Natalija Kostić	(Bosnia and Herzegovina) Jelena Simić (Argentina) Guadalupe Pérez Rojas (Italy) Nastassja Burnett (Egypt) Sandra Samir
February 5	Antalya, Turkey; Hard $15,000; Singles and doubles draws	(Canada) Rebecca Marino; 6–1, 6–4	(Switzerland) Nina Stadler	(Turkey) Melis Sezer (Slovakia) Natália Vajdová	(Romania) Raluca Georgiana Șerban (Italy) Gaia Sanesi (Belgium) Eliessa Vanlangendonck (Italy) Giada Clerici
February 5	Antalya, Turkey; Hard $15,000; Singles and doubles draws	(Romania) Raluca Georgiana Șerban (Romania) Oana Georgeta Simion; 6–2, 7–6^{(7–5)}	(Japan) Mana Ayukawa (Switzerland) Nina Stadler	(Turkey) Melis Sezer (Slovakia) Natália Vajdová	(Romania) Raluca Georgiana Șerban (Italy) Gaia Sanesi (Belgium) Eliessa Vanlangendonck (Italy) Giada Clerici
February 12	Perth, Australia; Hard $25,000; Singles and doubles draws	(Russia) Irina Khromacheva; 6–2, 6–3	(United Kingdom) Katy Dunne	(United Kingdom) Laura Robson (Australia) Maddison Inglis	(France) Myrtille Georges (Japan) Mai Minokoshi (United Kingdom) Gabriella Taylor (Australia) Jaimee Fourlis
February 12	Perth, Australia; Hard $25,000; Singles and doubles draws	(Australia) Jessica Moore (Australia) Ellen Perez; 6–7^{(6–8)}, 6–1, [7–9] ret.	(Australia) Olivia Tjandramulia (Australia) Belinda Woolcock	(United Kingdom) Laura Robson (Australia) Maddison Inglis	(France) Myrtille Georges (Japan) Mai Minokoshi (United Kingdom) Gabriella Taylor (Australia) Jaimee Fourlis
February 12	Surprise, United States; Hard $25,000; Singles and doubles draws	(Belgium) Yanina Wickmayer; 3–6, 6–3, 6–4	(Mexico) Ana Sofía Sánchez	(Ukraine) Olga Ianchuk (Czech Republic) Marie Bouzková	(Russia) Evgeniya Rodina (France) Marine Partaud (United Kingdom) Katie Boulter (United States) Julia Boserup
February 12	Surprise, United States; Hard $25,000; Singles and doubles draws	(Japan) Misaki Doi (Belgium) Yanina Wickmayer; 2–6, 6–3, [10–8]	(United States) Jacqueline Cako (United States) Caitlin Whoriskey	(Ukraine) Olga Ianchuk (Czech Republic) Marie Bouzková	(Russia) Evgeniya Rodina (France) Marine Partaud (United Kingdom) Katie Boulter (United States) Julia Boserup
February 12	Sharm El Sheikh, Egypt; Hard $15,000; Singles and doubles draws	(Slovenia) Nastja Kolar; 6–2, 6–4	(Thailand) Bunyawi Thamchaiwat	(Russia) Anna Morgina (Russia) Valeriya Solovyeva	(Russia) Anastasia Pribylova (Belgium) Hélène Scholsen (Czech Republic) Karolína Beránková (Italy) Ludmilla Samsonova
February 12	Sharm El Sheikh, Egypt; Hard $15,000; Singles and doubles draws	(Russia) Anna Morgina (Russia) Valeriya Solovyeva; 6–4, 6–2	(Germany) Constanze Stepan (Poland) Iga Świątek	(Russia) Anna Morgina (Russia) Valeriya Solovyeva	(Russia) Anastasia Pribylova (Belgium) Hélène Scholsen (Czech Republic) Karolína Beránková (Italy) Ludmilla Samsonova
February 12	Bergamo, Italy; Clay (indoor) $15,000; Singles and doubles draws	(Italy) Martina Colmegna; 6–2, 6–1	(Germany) Lena Rüffer	(Italy) Francesca Bullani (Italy) Martina Di Giuseppe	(Switzerland) Lisa Sabino (France) Marie Témin (France) Lou Brouleau (Italy) Lucrezia Stefanini
February 12	Bergamo, Italy; Clay (indoor) $15,000; Singles and doubles draws	(Russia) Kseniia Bekker (Kyrgyzstan) Ksenia Palkina; 6–4, 4–6, [10–8]	(Italy) Martina Colmegna (Italy) Claudia Giovine	(Italy) Francesca Bullani (Italy) Martina Di Giuseppe	(Switzerland) Lisa Sabino (France) Marie Témin (France) Lou Brouleau (Italy) Lucrezia Stefanini
February 12	Manacor, Spain; Clay $15,000; Singles and doubles draws	(Moldova) Alexandra Perper; 6–1, 7–5	(Japan) Naho Sato	(Spain) Guiomar Maristany (Spain) Irene Burillo Escorihuela	(Spain) Marina Bassols Ribera (Bulgaria) Isabella Shinikova (Chinese Taipei) Joanna Garland (India) Snehadevi Reddy
February 12	Manacor, Spain; Clay $15,000; Singles and doubles draws	(Spain) Irene Burillo Escorihuela (Spain) Olga Parres Azcoitia; 6–4, 2–6, [10–7]	(Australia) Seone Mendez (Moldova) Alexandra Perper	(Spain) Guiomar Maristany (Spain) Irene Burillo Escorihuela	(Spain) Marina Bassols Ribera (Bulgaria) Isabella Shinikova (Chinese Taipei) Joanna Garland (India) Snehadevi Reddy
February 12	Hammamet, Tunisia; Clay $15,000; Singles and doubles draws	(Romania) Andreea Amalia Roșca; 6–2, 6–4	(Serbia) Natalija Kostić	(Chinese Taipei) Hsu Chieh-yu (Finland) Mia Eklund	(Bosnia and Herzegovina) Jelena Simić (Romania) Irina Fetecău (Sweden) Marina Yudanov (Italy) Verena Hofer
February 12	Hammamet, Tunisia; Clay $15,000; Singles and doubles draws	(Italy) Melania Delai (Italy) Angelica Moratelli; 6–2, 6–4	(Chinese Taipei) Hsu Chieh-yu (Egypt) Sandra Samir	(Chinese Taipei) Hsu Chieh-yu (Finland) Mia Eklund	(Bosnia and Herzegovina) Jelena Simić (Romania) Irina Fetecău (Sweden) Marina Yudanov (Italy) Verena Hofer
February 12	Antalya, Turkey; Hard $15,000; Singles and doubles draws	(Canada) Rebecca Marino; 6–2, 6–1	(Italy) Gaia Sanesi	(Georgia (country)) Ekaterine Gorgodze (Russia) Amina Anshba	(Switzerland) Nina Stadler (Romania) Raluca Georgiana Șerban (South Korea) Lee Eun-hye (Italy) Martina Caregaro
February 12	Antalya, Turkey; Hard $15,000; Singles and doubles draws	(Georgia (country)) Ekaterine Gorgodze (Bosnia and Herzegovina) Dea Herdželaš; 6–2, 6–4	(Italy) Martina Caregaro (Italy) Federica Di Sarra	(Georgia (country)) Ekaterine Gorgodze (Russia) Amina Anshba	(Switzerland) Nina Stadler (Romania) Raluca Georgiana Șerban (South Korea) Lee Eun-hye (Italy) Martina Caregaro
February 19	Perth, Australia; Hard $25,000; Singles and doubles draws	(United Kingdom) Gabriella Taylor; 6–2, 7–5	(France) Myrtille Georges	(Romania) Jaqueline Cristian (Australia) Jaimee Fourlis	(Croatia) Tereza Mrdeža (United Kingdom) Katy Dunne (Japan) Mayo Hibi (Russia) Irina Khromacheva
February 19	Perth, Australia; Hard $25,000; Singles and doubles draws	(Australia) Jessica Moore (Australia) Olivia Tjandramulia; 7–5, 6–7^{(8–10)}, [11–9]	(Australia) Alison Bai (China) Lu Jiajing	(Romania) Jaqueline Cristian (Australia) Jaimee Fourlis	(Croatia) Tereza Mrdeža (United Kingdom) Katy Dunne (Japan) Mayo Hibi (Russia) Irina Khromacheva
February 19	Curitiba, Brazil; Clay $25,000; Singles and doubles draws	(Slovenia) Tamara Zidanšek; 7–5, 6–4	(France) Fiona Ferro	(Colombia) Mariana Duque (Austria) Julia Grabher	(France) Audrey Albié (Argentina) Victoria Bosio (France) Sara Cakarevic (United Kingdom) Katie Swan
February 19	Curitiba, Brazil; Clay $25,000; Singles and doubles draws	(Chinese Taipei) Hsu Chieh-yu (Mexico) Marcela Zacarías; 6–0, 6–3	(France) Audrey Albié (France) Harmony Tan	(Colombia) Mariana Duque (Austria) Julia Grabher	(France) Audrey Albié (Argentina) Victoria Bosio (France) Sara Cakarevic (United Kingdom) Katie Swan
February 19	Altenkirchen, Germany; Carpet (indoor) $25,000; Singles and doubles draws	(United Kingdom) Harriet Dart; 7–6^{(7–5)}, 6–2	(Czech Republic) Karolína Muchová	(Belgium) Maryna Zanevska (France) Chloé Paquet	(Russia) Polina Monova (Italy) Camilla Rosatello (Czech Republic) Jesika Malečková (Luxembourg) Mandy Minella
February 19	Altenkirchen, Germany; Carpet (indoor) $25,000; Singles and doubles draws	(Latvia) Diāna Marcinkēviča (Poland) Katarzyna Piter; Walkover	(Greece) Valentini Grammatikopoulou (Belgium) Maryna Zanevska	(Belgium) Maryna Zanevska (France) Chloé Paquet	(Russia) Polina Monova (Italy) Camilla Rosatello (Czech Republic) Jesika Malečková (Luxembourg) Mandy Minella
February 19	Rancho Santa Fe, United States; Hard $25,000; Singles and doubles draws	(United States) Asia Muhammad; 6–4, 2–6, 7–6^{(7–3)}	(Japan) Kurumi Nara	(United States) Sachia Vickery (United States) Ann Li	(United States) Victoria Duval (Japan) Misaki Doi (Russia) Evgeniya Rodina (Bulgaria) Elitsa Kostova
February 19	Rancho Santa Fe, United States; Hard $25,000; Singles and doubles draws	(United States) Kaitlyn Christian (United States) Sabrina Santamaria; 6–7^{(6–8)}, 6–1, [10–6]	(Czech Republic) Eva Hrdinová (United States) Taylor Townsend	(United States) Sachia Vickery (United States) Ann Li	(United States) Victoria Duval (Japan) Misaki Doi (Russia) Evgeniya Rodina (Bulgaria) Elitsa Kostova
February 19	Sharm El Sheikh, Egypt; Hard $15,000; Singles and doubles draws	(Poland) Iga Świątek; 6–3, 6–1	(Belgium) Britt Geukens	(Spain) María Gutiérrez Carrasco (Russia) Valeriya Solovyeva	(Belgium) Hélène Scholsen (Russia) Anastasia Pribylova (Chinese Taipei) Lee Pei-chi (Thailand) Bunyawi Thamchaiwat
February 19	Sharm El Sheikh, Egypt; Hard $15,000; Singles and doubles draws	(Italy) Martina Colmegna (Russia) Valeriya Solovyeva; 6–2, 6–3	(Chinese Taipei) Lee Pei-chi (India) Pranjala Yadlapalli	(Spain) María Gutiérrez Carrasco (Russia) Valeriya Solovyeva	(Belgium) Hélène Scholsen (Russia) Anastasia Pribylova (Chinese Taipei) Lee Pei-chi (Thailand) Bunyawi Thamchaiwat
February 19	Solarino, Italy; Carpet $15,000; Singles and doubles draws	(Netherlands) Michaëlla Krajicek; 6–3, 6–2	(Czech Republic) Monika Kilnarová	(Italy) Stefania Rubini (Belarus) Sviatlana Pirazhenka	(France) Lou Adler (Belgium) Greet Minnen (Italy) Federica Arcidiacono (Kyrgyzstan) Ksenia Palkina
February 19	Solarino, Italy; Carpet $15,000; Singles and doubles draws	(United Kingdom) Emily Appleton (United States) Quinn Gleason; 3–6, 7–5, [10–8]	(France) Mathilde Armitano (Italy) Maria Masini	(Italy) Stefania Rubini (Belarus) Sviatlana Pirazhenka	(France) Lou Adler (Belgium) Greet Minnen (Italy) Federica Arcidiacono (Kyrgyzstan) Ksenia Palkina
February 19	Palma Nova, Spain; Clay $15,000; Singles and doubles draws	(Australia) Seone Mendez; 6–7^{(3–7)}, 6–1, 6–2	(Spain) Marina Bassols Ribera	(Algeria) Inès Ibbou (Moldova) Alexandra Perper	(Spain) Estrella Cabeza Candela (Japan) Aiko Yoshitomi (Switzerland) Ylena In-Albon (Bulgaria) Isabella Shinikova
February 19	Palma Nova, Spain; Clay $15,000; Singles and doubles draws	(Japan) Erina Hayashi (Japan) Chisa Hosonuma; 7–5, 7–5	(Japan) Yukina Saigo (Japan) Aiko Yoshitomi	(Algeria) Inès Ibbou (Moldova) Alexandra Perper	(Spain) Estrella Cabeza Candela (Japan) Aiko Yoshitomi (Switzerland) Ylena In-Albon (Bulgaria) Isabella Shinikova
February 19	Hammamet, Tunisia; Clay $15,000; Singles and doubles draws	(France) Margot Yerolymos; 4–6, 6–2, 6–0	(Romania) Andreea Amalia Roșca	(Italy) Anastasia Grymalska (France) Estelle Cascino	(United States) Anastasia Nefedova (Cambodia) Andrea Ka (France) Caroline Roméo (Romania) Andreea Ghițescu
February 19	Hammamet, Tunisia; Clay $15,000; Singles and doubles draws	(United States) Anastasia Nefedova (Romania) Andreea Amalia Roșca; 6–3, 6–1	(United States) Elizabeth Halbauer (France) Caroline Roméo	(Italy) Anastasia Grymalska (France) Estelle Cascino	(United States) Anastasia Nefedova (Cambodia) Andrea Ka (France) Caroline Roméo (Romania) Andreea Ghițescu
February 19	Antalya, Turkey; Clay $15,000; Singles and doubles draws	(Romania) Oana Georgeta Simion; 2–6, 6–2, 7–5	(Romania) Ilona Georgiana Ghioroaie	(Georgia (country)) Ekaterine Gorgodze (Slovenia) Nina Potočnik	(Italy) Federica Di Sarra (Bosnia and Herzegovina) Dea Herdželaš (Italy) Martina Caregaro (Canada) Rebecca Marino
February 19	Antalya, Turkey; Clay $15,000; Singles and doubles draws	Doubles competition cancelled due to bad weather		(Georgia (country)) Ekaterine Gorgodze (Slovenia) Nina Potočnik	(Italy) Federica Di Sarra (Bosnia and Herzegovina) Dea Herdželaš (Italy) Martina Caregaro (Canada) Rebecca Marino
February 26	São Paulo, Brazil; Clay $25,000; Singles and doubles draws	(Austria) Julia Grabher; 6–4, 3–6, 6–2	(Slovenia) Tamara Zidanšek	(Colombia) Mariana Duque (Austria) Barbara Haas	(Netherlands) Cindy Burger (Switzerland) Conny Perrin (Spain) Sílvia Soler Espinosa (Venezuela) Andrea Gámiz
February 26	São Paulo, Brazil; Clay $25,000; Singles and doubles draws	(United Kingdom) Tara Moore (Switzerland) Conny Perrin; 6–4, 3–6, [13–11]	(Chinese Taipei) Hsu Chieh-yu (Mexico) Marcela Zacarías	(Colombia) Mariana Duque (Austria) Barbara Haas	(Netherlands) Cindy Burger (Switzerland) Conny Perrin (Spain) Sílvia Soler Espinosa (Venezuela) Andrea Gámiz
February 26	Xiamen, China; Hard $15,000; Singles and doubles draws	(China) Gao Xinyu; 6–1, 6–2	(Uzbekistan) Sabina Sharipova	(Hong Kong) Zhang Ling (China) Zhang Kailin	(China) Gai Ao (Switzerland) Lulu Sun (China) Wang Meiling (China) Wang Xinyu
February 26	Xiamen, China; Hard $15,000; Singles and doubles draws	(Germany) Sarah-Rebecca Sekulic (China) Xu Shilin; 6–1, 7–5	(China) Sun Xuliu (China) Sun Ziyue	(Hong Kong) Zhang Ling (China) Zhang Kailin	(China) Gai Ao (Switzerland) Lulu Sun (China) Wang Meiling (China) Wang Xinyu
February 26	Sharm El Sheikh, Egypt; Hard $15,000; Singles and doubles draws	(Turkey) Berfu Cengiz; 6–3, 4–6, 6–3	(Belarus) Yuliya Hatouka	(Italy) Lucia Bronzetti (Poland) Iga Świątek	(Russia) Anna Morgina (Greece) Despina Papamichail (United Kingdom) Emily Webley-Smith (Russia) Valeriya Solovyeva
February 26	Sharm El Sheikh, Egypt; Hard $15,000; Singles and doubles draws	(Denmark) Emilie Francati (Belgium) Britt Geukens; 6–0, 6–3	(Belarus) Yuliya Hatouka (Belarus) Iryna Shymanovich	(Italy) Lucia Bronzetti (Poland) Iga Świątek	(Russia) Anna Morgina (Greece) Despina Papamichail (United Kingdom) Emily Webley-Smith (Russia) Valeriya Solovyeva
February 26	Mâcon, France; Hard (indoor) $15,000; Singles and doubles draws	(Switzerland) Simona Waltert; 6–4, 3–6, 6–3	(Switzerland) Tess Sugnaux	(Latvia) Daniela Vismane (Belgium) Marie Benoît	(United Kingdom) Alicia Barnett (France) Manon Arcangioli (Turkey) Pemra Özgen (Germany) Katharina Hobgarski
February 26	Mâcon, France; Hard (indoor) $15,000; Singles and doubles draws	(France) Mathilde Armitano (France) Elixane Lechemia; 6–1, 3–6, [10–8]	(France) Manon Arcangioli (Latvia) Diāna Marcinkēviča	(Latvia) Daniela Vismane (Belgium) Marie Benoît	(United Kingdom) Alicia Barnett (France) Manon Arcangioli (Turkey) Pemra Özgen (Germany) Katharina Hobgarski
February 26	Heraklion, Greece; Clay $15,000; Singles and doubles draws	(Romania) Raluca Georgiana Șerban; 6–3, 5–7, 6–2	(Czech Republic) Anastasia Dețiuc	(Switzerland) Lisa Sabino (United Kingdom) Emily Appleton	(United States) Kariann Pierre-Louis (Czech Republic) Kateřina Vaňková (The Bahamas) Kerrie Cartwright (Germany) Laura Schaeder
February 26	Heraklion, Greece; Clay $15,000; Singles and doubles draws	(Belgium) Michaela Boev (Romania) Raluca Georgiana Șerban; 6–1, 2–6, [10–7]	(Romania) Gabriela Ana Maria Davidescu (Romania) Alexandra Maria Stăiculescu	(Switzerland) Lisa Sabino (United Kingdom) Emily Appleton	(United States) Kariann Pierre-Louis (Czech Republic) Kateřina Vaňková (The Bahamas) Kerrie Cartwright (Germany) Laura Schaeder
February 26	Solarino, Italy; Carpet $15,000; Singles and doubles draws	(Italy) Stefania Rubini; 6–4, 6–2	(Belarus) Sviatlana Pirazhenka	(Belgium) Greet Minnen (Germany) Romy Kölzer	(France) Lou Adler (Germany) Tayisiya Morderger (Russia) Anastasia Kulikova (Czech Republic) Monika Kilnarová
February 26	Solarino, Italy; Carpet $15,000; Singles and doubles draws	(United States) Quinn Gleason (Belarus) Sviatlana Pirazhenka; 6–4, 6–4	(Germany) Anna Klasen (Germany) Romy Kölzer	(Belgium) Greet Minnen (Germany) Romy Kölzer	(France) Lou Adler (Germany) Tayisiya Morderger (Russia) Anastasia Kulikova (Czech Republic) Monika Kilnarová
February 26	Moscow, Russia; Hard (indoor) $15,000; Singles and doubles draws	(Russia) Olga Doroshina; 6–3, 6–3	(Russia) Daria Kruzhkova	(Russia) Daria Nazarkina (Russia) Sofya Lansere	(Russia) Kamilla Rakhimova (Russia) Anastasia Gasanova (Russia) Diana Demidova (Russia) Vlada Koval
February 26	Moscow, Russia; Hard (indoor) $15,000; Singles and doubles draws	(Russia) Anastasia Kharitonova (Russia) Daria Nazarkina; 6–7^{(5–7)}, 7–6^{(7–2)}, [21–19]	(Russia) Olga Doroshina (Russia) Daria Kruzhkova	(Russia) Daria Nazarkina (Russia) Sofya Lansere	(Russia) Kamilla Rakhimova (Russia) Anastasia Gasanova (Russia) Diana Demidova (Russia) Vlada Koval
February 26	Palma Nova, Spain; Clay $15,000; Singles and doubles draws	(Switzerland) Ylena In-Albon; 6–1, 7–5	(Bulgaria) Isabella Shinikova	(Germany) Katharina Gerlach (Spain) Yvonne Cavallé Reimers	(Spain) Irene Burillo Escorihuela (Moldova) Alexandra Perper (Germany) Lena Rüffer (Spain) Alba Carrillo Marín
February 26	Palma Nova, Spain; Clay $15,000; Singles and doubles draws	(Japan) Yukina Saigo (Japan) Aiko Yoshitomi; 6–4, 6–2	(Germany) Katharina Gerlach (Germany) Lena Rüffer	(Germany) Katharina Gerlach (Spain) Yvonne Cavallé Reimers	(Spain) Irene Burillo Escorihuela (Moldova) Alexandra Perper (Germany) Lena Rüffer (Spain) Alba Carrillo Marín
February 26	Hammamet, Tunisia; Clay $15,000; Singles and doubles draws	(Romania) Andreea Amalia Roșca; 6–2, 6–2	(Italy) Anastasia Grymalska	(Russia) Maria Marfutina (Slovenia) Veronika Erjavec	(Finland) Mia Eklund (Italy) Nastassja Burnett (Italy) Anna-Giulia Remondina (Bulgaria) Julia Stamatova
February 26	Hammamet, Tunisia; Clay $15,000; Singles and doubles draws	(Italy) Anastasia Grymalska (Italy) Michele Alexandra Zmău; 6–2, 6–3	(Argentina) Guillermina Naya (Argentina) Guadalupe Pérez Rojas	(Russia) Maria Marfutina (Slovenia) Veronika Erjavec	(Finland) Mia Eklund (Italy) Nastassja Burnett (Italy) Anna-Giulia Remondina (Bulgaria) Julia Stamatova
February 26	Antalya, Turkey; Clay $15,000; Singles and doubles draws	(Romania) Ilona Georgiana Ghioroaie; 7–6^{(7–1)}, 3–6, 6–4	(Russia) Amina Anshba	(Romania) Karola Patricia Bejenaru (Romania) Cristina Dinu	(Turkey) Başak Eraydın (Belgium) Luna Meers (Hungary) Ágnes Bukta (Ukraine) Anastasiya Vasylyeva
February 26	Antalya, Turkey; Clay $15,000; Singles and doubles draws	(Hungary) Ágnes Bukta (Bosnia and Herzegovina) Dea Herdželaš; 6–3, 6–3	(Russia) Amina Anshba (Ukraine) Anastasiya Vasylyeva	(Romania) Karola Patricia Bejenaru (Romania) Cristina Dinu	(Turkey) Başak Eraydın (Belgium) Luna Meers (Hungary) Ágnes Bukta (Ukraine) Anastasiya Vasylyeva

=== March ===
Week of	Tournament	Winner	Runners-up	Semifinalists	Quarterfinalists
March 5	Zhuhai Open; Zhuhai, China; Hard $60,000; Singles – Doubles	(Belgium) Maryna Zanevska; 6–2, 6–4	(Ukraine) Marta Kostyuk	(Slovakia) Anna Karolína Schmiedlová (Russia) Anna Kalinskaya	(Russia) Vitalia Diatchenko (Slovenia) Dalila Jakupović (Slovakia) Viktória Kužmová (Australia) Destanee Aiava
March 5	Zhuhai Open; Zhuhai, China; Hard $60,000; Singles – Doubles	(Russia) Anna Blinkova (Netherlands) Lesley Kerkhove; 7–5, 6–4	(Japan) Nao Hibino (Montenegro) Danka Kovinić	(Slovakia) Anna Karolína Schmiedlová (Russia) Anna Kalinskaya	(Russia) Vitalia Diatchenko (Slovenia) Dalila Jakupović (Slovakia) Viktória Kužmová (Australia) Destanee Aiava
March 5	Mildura, Australia; Grass $25,000; Singles and doubles draws	(United Kingdom) Gabriella Taylor; 6–0, 6–3	(France) Shérazad Reix	(United Kingdom) Katy Dunne (Australia) Masa Jovanovic	(Australia) Maddison Inglis (Ukraine) Marianna Zakarlyuk (Australia) Olivia Tjandramulia (Japan) Michika Ozeki
March 5	Mildura, Australia; Grass $25,000; Singles and doubles draws	(United Kingdom) Katy Dunne (United Kingdom) Gabriella Taylor; 5–7, 7–6^{(7–4)}, [10–5]	(Australia) Alexandra Bozovic (Australia) Olivia Tjandramulia	(United Kingdom) Katy Dunne (Australia) Masa Jovanovic	(Australia) Maddison Inglis (Ukraine) Marianna Zakarlyuk (Australia) Olivia Tjandramulia (Japan) Michika Ozeki
March 5	Keio Challenger; Yokohama, Japan; Hard $25,000; Singles and doubles draws	(Russia) Veronika Kudermetova; 6–2, 6–4	(United Kingdom) Harriet Dart	(Canada) Katherine Sebov (South Korea) Han Na-lae	(Japan) Momoko Kobori (Japan) Moyuka Uchijima (United Kingdom) Laura Robson (China) Lu Jiajing
March 5	Keio Challenger; Yokohama, Japan; Hard $25,000; Singles and doubles draws	(United Kingdom) Laura Robson (Hungary) Fanny Stollár; 5–7, 6–2, [10–4]	(Japan) Momoko Kobori (Japan) Chihiro Muramatsu	(Canada) Katherine Sebov (South Korea) Han Na-lae	(Japan) Momoko Kobori (Japan) Moyuka Uchijima (United Kingdom) Laura Robson (China) Lu Jiajing
March 5	Campinas, Brazil; Clay $15,000; Singles and doubles draws	(France) Harmony Tan; 6–2, 6–0	(France) Alice Ramé	(Brazil) Eduarda Piai (Netherlands) Cindy Burger	(Brazil) Nathaly Kurata (Brazil) Gabriela Cé (Chile) Fernanda Brito (Mexico) Marcela Zacarías
March 5	Campinas, Brazil; Clay $15,000; Singles and doubles draws	(Chile) Fernanda Brito (Paraguay) Camila Giangreco Campiz; 6–4, 4–6, [10–4]	(Paraguay) Lara Escauriza (Mexico) Marcela Zacarías	(Brazil) Eduarda Piai (Netherlands) Cindy Burger	(Brazil) Nathaly Kurata (Brazil) Gabriela Cé (Chile) Fernanda Brito (Mexico) Marcela Zacarías
March 5	Sharm El Sheikh, Egypt; Hard $15,000; Singles and doubles draws	(Bulgaria) Julia Terziyska; 6–7^{(4–7)}, 6–0, 7–6^{(7–4)}	(Italy) Ludmilla Samsonova	(Italy) Lucia Bronzetti (Belgium) An-Sophie Mestach	(United States) Nadja Gilchrist (Egypt) Sandra Samir (Switzerland) Nina Stadler (Italy) Gaia Sanesi
March 5	Sharm El Sheikh, Egypt; Hard $15,000; Singles and doubles draws	(Belarus) Yuliya Hatouka (Chinese Taipei) Lee Pei-chi; 4–6, 7–6^{(7–5)}, [10–8]	(Romania) Laura-Ioana Andrei (Bulgaria) Julia Terziyska	(Italy) Lucia Bronzetti (Belgium) An-Sophie Mestach	(United States) Nadja Gilchrist (Egypt) Sandra Samir (Switzerland) Nina Stadler (Italy) Gaia Sanesi
March 5	Amiens, France; Clay (indoor) $15,000; Singles and doubles draws	(Ukraine) Katarina Zavatska; 6–1, 6–2	(Luxembourg) Eléonora Molinaro	(France) Priscilla Heise (France) Julie Gervais	(France) Léa Tholey (France) Émeline Dartron (Italy) Angelica Moratelli (Germany) Katharina Hobgarski
March 5	Amiens, France; Clay (indoor) $15,000; Singles and doubles draws	(France) Julie Belgraver (Netherlands) Isabelle Haverlag; 7–6^{(7–4)}, 6–2	(Belgium) Lara Salden (France) Camille Sireix	(France) Priscilla Heise (France) Julie Gervais	(France) Léa Tholey (France) Émeline Dartron (Italy) Angelica Moratelli (Germany) Katharina Hobgarski
March 5	Heraklion, Greece; Clay $15,000; Singles and doubles draws	(Czech Republic) Anastasia Dețiuc; 6–3, 6–2	(Hungary) Anna Bondár	(Czech Republic) Miriam Kolodziejová (Romania) Raluca Georgiana Șerban	(Italy) Martina Spigarelli (Czech Republic) Dagmar Dudláková (United States) Anastasia Nefedova (Hungary) Réka Luca Jani
March 5	Heraklion, Greece; Clay $15,000; Singles and doubles draws	(The Bahamas) Kerrie Cartwright (United States) Kariann Pierre-Louis; 6–4, 7–5	(Belgium) Michaela Boev (Romania) Raluca Georgiana Șerban	(Czech Republic) Miriam Kolodziejová (Romania) Raluca Georgiana Șerban	(Italy) Martina Spigarelli (Czech Republic) Dagmar Dudláková (United States) Anastasia Nefedova (Hungary) Réka Luca Jani
March 5	Bhopal, India; Hard $15,000; Singles and doubles draws	(Slovakia) Tereza Mihalíková; 6–1, 5–7, 6–0	(United Kingdom) Emily Webley-Smith	(India) Kanika Vaidya (India) Dhruthi Tatachar Venugopal	(United Kingdom) Freya Christie (Thailand) Bunyawi Thamchaiwat (India) Riya Bhatia (India) Prerna Bhambri
March 5	Bhopal, India; Hard $15,000; Singles and doubles draws	(India) Kanika Vaidya (Netherlands) Rosalie van der Hoek; 1–2, ret.	(Slovakia) Tereza Mihalíková (Montenegro) Ana Veselinović	(India) Kanika Vaidya (India) Dhruthi Tatachar Venugopal	(United Kingdom) Freya Christie (Thailand) Bunyawi Thamchaiwat (India) Riya Bhatia (India) Prerna Bhambri
March 5	Solarino, Italy; Carpet $15,000; Singles and doubles draws	(Belgium) Greet Minnen; 2–6, 6–2, 6–4	(United States) Quinn Gleason	(Italy) Stefania Rubini (Germany) Tayisiya Morderger	(Poland) Katarzyna Kawa (Germany) Anna Klasen (Belarus) Shalimar Talbi (Italy) Dalila Spiteri
March 5	Solarino, Italy; Carpet $15,000; Singles and doubles draws	(Poland) Katarzyna Kawa (Belarus) Shalimar Talbi; 6–3, 6–4	(Australia) Laura Ashley (United States) Quinn Gleason	(Italy) Stefania Rubini (Germany) Tayisiya Morderger	(Poland) Katarzyna Kawa (Germany) Anna Klasen (Belarus) Shalimar Talbi (Italy) Dalila Spiteri
March 5	Hammamet, Tunisia; Clay $15,000; Singles and doubles draws	(United States) Elizabeth Halbauer; 6–3, 6–3	(Italy) Lucrezia Stefanini	(Croatia) Tereza Mrdeža (Italy) Anna-Giulia Remondina	(Italy) Michele Alexandra Zmău (Croatia) Lea Bošković (Romania) Andreea Prisăcariu (Portugal) Francisca Jorge
March 5	Hammamet, Tunisia; Clay $15,000; Singles and doubles draws	(United States) Elizabeth Halbauer (Bulgaria) Julia Stamatova; 6–4, 6–3	(Italy) Giorgia Marchetti (Italy) Alice Matteucci	(Croatia) Tereza Mrdeža (Italy) Anna-Giulia Remondina	(Italy) Michele Alexandra Zmău (Croatia) Lea Bošković (Romania) Andreea Prisăcariu (Portugal) Francisca Jorge
March 5	Antalya, Turkey; Clay $15,000; Singles and doubles draws	(Russia) Amina Anshba; 6–0, 6–0	(Turkey) Başak Eraydın	(Turkey) Melis Sezer (Romania) Nicoleta Dascălu	(Russia) Yana Sizikova (Hungary) Ágnes Bukta (Switzerland) Daniela Vukovic (Czech Republic) Gabriela Pantůčková
March 5	Antalya, Turkey; Clay $15,000; Singles and doubles draws	(United States) Catherine Harrison (United States) Sarah Lee; 6–4, 6–3	(Russia) Amina Anshba (Turkey) Melis Sezer	(Turkey) Melis Sezer (Romania) Nicoleta Dascălu	(Russia) Yana Sizikova (Hungary) Ágnes Bukta (Switzerland) Daniela Vukovic (Czech Republic) Gabriela Pantůčková
March 5	Orlando, United States; Clay $15,000; Singles and doubles draws	(United States) Sophie Chang; 6–3, 7–6^{(8–6)}	(Australia) Astra Sharma	(United States) Jessica Pegula (South Africa) Chanel Simmonds	(United States) Usue Maitane Arconada (United States) Whitney Osuigwe (United States) Katerina Stewart (Spain) Aliona Bolsova Zadoinov
March 5	Orlando, United States; Clay $15,000; Singles and doubles draws	(United States) Caty McNally (United States) Whitney Osuigwe; 6–2, 6–3	(Bulgaria) Dia Evtimova (Belarus) Ilona Kremen	(United States) Jessica Pegula (South Africa) Chanel Simmonds	(United States) Usue Maitane Arconada (United States) Whitney Osuigwe (United States) Katerina Stewart (Spain) Aliona Bolsova Zadoinov
March 12	Pingshan Open; Shenzhen, China; Hard $60,000; Singles – Doubles	(Slovakia) Viktória Kužmová; 7–5, 6–3	(Russia) Anna Kalinskaya	(Russia) Anna Blinkova (Ukraine) Marta Kostyuk	(Czech Republic) Denisa Allertová (China) Zheng Saisai (Romania) Alexandra Cadanțu (Thailand) Luksika Kumkhum
March 12	Pingshan Open; Shenzhen, China; Hard $60,000; Singles – Doubles	(Russia) Anna Kalinskaya (Slovakia) Viktória Kužmová; 6–4, 1–6, [10–7]	(Montenegro) Danka Kovinić (China) Wang Xinyu	(Russia) Anna Blinkova (Ukraine) Marta Kostyuk	(Czech Republic) Denisa Allertová (China) Zheng Saisai (Romania) Alexandra Cadanțu (Thailand) Luksika Kumkhum
March 12	Gwalior, India; Hard $25,000; Singles and doubles draws	(India) Ankita Raina; 6–2, 7–5	(France) Amandine Hesse	(Russia) Yana Sizikova (Slovakia) Tereza Mihalíková	(India) Karman Thandi (United States) Monica Robinson (Greece) Despina Papamichail (Montenegro) Ana Veselinović
March 12	Gwalior, India; Hard $25,000; Singles and doubles draws	(Russia) Yana Sizikova (Montenegro) Ana Veselinović; 6–3, 2–6, [10–5]	(United Kingdom) Freya Christie (Uzbekistan) Albina Khabibulina	(Russia) Yana Sizikova (Slovakia) Tereza Mihalíková	(India) Karman Thandi (United States) Monica Robinson (Greece) Despina Papamichail (Montenegro) Ana Veselinović
March 12	Pula, Italy; Clay $25,000; Singles and doubles draws	(Turkey) Başak Eraydın; 6–4, 6–1	(Bulgaria) Elitsa Kostova	(Slovakia) Michaela Hončová (Italy) Federica Di Sarra	(Germany) Laura Siegemund (France) Fiona Ferro (Romania) Alexandra Dulgheru (Italy) Anastasia Grymalska
March 12	Pula, Italy; Clay $25,000; Singles and doubles draws	(Georgia (country)) Ekaterine Gorgodze (Georgia (country)) Sofia Shapatava; 6–4, 7–6^{(7–5)}	(Germany) Katharina Gerlach (Germany) Lena Rüffer	(Slovakia) Michaela Hončová (Italy) Federica Di Sarra	(Germany) Laura Siegemund (France) Fiona Ferro (Romania) Alexandra Dulgheru (Italy) Anastasia Grymalska
March 12	Toyota, Japan; Hard $25,000; Singles and doubles draws	(Serbia) Dejana Radanović; 6–4, 3–6, 6–4	(Canada) Katherine Sebov	(Turkey) Ayla Aksu (Hungary) Fanny Stollár	(Japan) Eri Hozumi (Japan) Erika Sema (United Kingdom) Harriet Dart (Israel) Julia Glushko
March 12	Toyota, Japan; Hard $25,000; Singles and doubles draws	(South Korea) Choi Ji-hee (South Korea) Kim Na-ri; 6–2, 6–3	(Japan) Rika Fujiwara (Hungary) Dalma Gálfi	(Turkey) Ayla Aksu (Hungary) Fanny Stollár	(Japan) Eri Hozumi (Japan) Erika Sema (United Kingdom) Harriet Dart (Israel) Julia Glushko
March 12	Irapuato, Mexico; Hard $25,000; Singles and doubles draws	(Czech Republic) Marie Bouzková; 6–4, 6–0	(Slovakia) Kristína Kučová	(Serbia) Jovana Jakšić (Chile) Alexa Guarachi	(Netherlands) Arantxa Rus (United States) Maria Sanchez (Mexico) Renata Zarazúa (Belgium) Ysaline Bonaventure
March 12	Irapuato, Mexico; Hard $25,000; Singles and doubles draws	(Chile) Alexa Guarachi (New Zealand) Erin Routliffe; 4–6, 6–2, [10–6]	(United States) Desirae Krawczyk (Mexico) Giuliana Olmos	(Serbia) Jovana Jakšić (Chile) Alexa Guarachi	(Netherlands) Arantxa Rus (United States) Maria Sanchez (Mexico) Renata Zarazúa (Belgium) Ysaline Bonaventure
March 12	São José dos Campos, Brazil; Clay $15,000; Singles and doubles draws	(Argentina) María Lourdes Carlé; 7–5, 1–6, 6–2	(Argentina) Victoria Bosio	(Peru) Dominique Schaefer (Brazil) Gabriela Cé	(Argentina) Stephanie Mariel Petit (Brazil) Nathaly Kurata (Argentina) Carla Lucero (Brazil) Thaisa Grana Pedretti
March 12	São José dos Campos, Brazil; Clay $15,000; Singles and doubles draws	(Brazil) Carolina Alves (Brazil) Thaisa Grana Pedretti; 6–4, 6–1	(Greece) Eleni Kordolaimi (Peru) Dominique Schaefer	(Peru) Dominique Schaefer (Brazil) Gabriela Cé	(Argentina) Stephanie Mariel Petit (Brazil) Nathaly Kurata (Argentina) Carla Lucero (Brazil) Thaisa Grana Pedretti
March 12	Sharm El Sheikh, Egypt; Hard $15,000; Singles and doubles draws	(Bulgaria) Julia Terziyska; 6–0, 6–2	(Spain) Nuria Párrizas Díaz	(Russia) Angelina Gabueva (Romania) Miriam Bianca Bulgaru	(Argentina) Nadia Podoroska (Romania) Laura-Ioana Andrei (United Kingdom) Jodie Anna Burrage (Switzerland) Susan Bandecchi
March 12	Sharm El Sheikh, Egypt; Hard $15,000; Singles and doubles draws	(Thailand) Kamonwan Buayam (Russia) Angelina Gabueva; 1–6, 6–4, [10–5]	(Romania) Laura-Ioana Andrei (Bulgaria) Julia Terziyska	(Russia) Angelina Gabueva (Romania) Miriam Bianca Bulgaru	(Argentina) Nadia Podoroska (Romania) Laura-Ioana Andrei (United Kingdom) Jodie Anna Burrage (Switzerland) Susan Bandecchi
March 12	Gonesse, France; Clay (indoor) $15,000; Singles and doubles draws	(Luxembourg) Eléonora Molinaro; 6–2, 6–1	(France) Marine Partaud	(Belgium) Marie Benoît (France) Emma Léné	(France) Margot Yerolymos (Latvia) Daniela Vismane (Italy) Angelica Moratelli (Belgium) Justine Pysson
March 12	Gonesse, France; Clay (indoor) $15,000; Singles and doubles draws	(Belgium) Lara Salden (France) Camille Sirieix; 7–6^{(7–5)}, 2–6, [11–9]	(Netherlands) Suzan Lamens (Belgium) Luna Meers	(Belgium) Marie Benoît (France) Emma Léné	(France) Margot Yerolymos (Latvia) Daniela Vismane (Italy) Angelica Moratelli (Belgium) Justine Pysson
March 12	Heraklion, Greece; Clay $15,000; Singles and doubles draws	(Hungary) Réka Luca Jani; 6–4, 7–5	(Spain) Rosa Vicens Mas	(Germany) Natalia Siedliska (United States) Anastasia Nefedova	(Hungary) Anna Bondár (Czech Republic) Kateřina Vaňková (Switzerland) Lisa Sabino (United Kingdom) Francesca Jones
March 12	Heraklion, Greece; Clay $15,000; Singles and doubles draws	(Hungary) Anna Bondár (Hungary) Réka Luca Jani; 7–5, 6–2	(Finland) Emma Laine (United States) Sabrina Santamaria	(Germany) Natalia Siedliska (United States) Anastasia Nefedova	(Hungary) Anna Bondár (Czech Republic) Kateřina Vaňková (Switzerland) Lisa Sabino (United Kingdom) Francesca Jones
March 12	Ramat HaSharon, Israel; Hard $15,000; Singles and doubles draws	(Belgium) Hélène Scholsen; 6–3, 6–2	(Russia) Anastasia Pribylova	(Germany) Caroline Werner (United States) Kana Daniel	(United States) Dasha Ivanova (France) Elixane Lechemia (France) Lou Adler (Kazakhstan) Gozal Ainitdinova
March 12	Ramat HaSharon, Israel; Hard $15,000; Singles and doubles draws	(United Kingdom) Alicia Barnett (United Kingdom) Olivia Nicholls; 6–4, 7–6^{(7–4)}	(Ecuador) Charlotte Römer (Germany) Caroline Werner	(Germany) Caroline Werner (United States) Kana Daniel	(United States) Dasha Ivanova (France) Elixane Lechemia (France) Lou Adler (Kazakhstan) Gozal Ainitdinova
March 12	Kazan, Russia; Hard (indoor) $15,000; Singles and doubles draws	(Russia) Elena Rybakina; 6–4, 7–6^{(7–5)}	(Russia) Daria Nazarkina	(Russia) Daria Mishina (Russia) Ekaterina Vishnevskaya	(Russia) Anastasia Gasanova (Russia) Polina Golubovskaya (Russia) Anastasia Frolova (Russia) Valeriya Zeleva
March 12	Kazan, Russia; Hard (indoor) $15,000; Singles and doubles draws	(Russia) Alena Fomina (Russia) Elena Rybakina; 6–4, 1–6, [10–6]	(Russia) Anastasia Frolova (Russia) Ksenia Lykina	(Russia) Daria Mishina (Russia) Ekaterina Vishnevskaya	(Russia) Anastasia Gasanova (Russia) Polina Golubovskaya (Russia) Anastasia Frolova (Russia) Valeriya Zeleva
March 12	Hammamet, Tunisia; Clay $15,000; Singles and doubles draws	(Croatia) Lea Bošković; 6–7^{(7–9)}, 6–3, 6–4	(Bulgaria) Isabella Shinikova	(Italy) Alice Matteucci (Italy) Lucrezia Stefanini	(Brazil) Laura Pigossi (Italy) Miriana Tona (United States) Elizabeth Halbauer (Bulgaria) Julia Stamatova
March 12	Hammamet, Tunisia; Clay $15,000; Singles and doubles draws	(Romania) Oana Gavrilă (Brazil) Laura Pigossi; 7–5, 6–7^{(6–8)}, [11–9]	(Austria) Melanie Klaffner (Romania) Oana Georgeta Simion	(Italy) Alice Matteucci (Italy) Lucrezia Stefanini	(Brazil) Laura Pigossi (Italy) Miriana Tona (United States) Elizabeth Halbauer (Bulgaria) Julia Stamatova
March 12	Antalya, Turkey; Clay $15,000; Singles and doubles draws	(Slovakia) Rebecca Šramková; 6–1, 7–6^{(7–3)}	(Russia) Amina Anshba	(Slovenia) Nika Radišič (Moldova) Alexandra Perper	(Japan) Satsuki Takamura (Slovenia) Veronika Erjavec (United States) Catherine Harrison (Romania) Cristina Dinu
March 12	Antalya, Turkey; Clay $15,000; Singles and doubles draws	(Switzerland) Xenia Knoll (Sweden) Cornelia Lister; 6–0, 5–7, [10–8]	(Russia) Amina Anshba (Kyrgyzstan) Ksenia Palkina	(Slovenia) Nika Radišič (Moldova) Alexandra Perper	(Japan) Satsuki Takamura (Slovenia) Veronika Erjavec (United States) Catherine Harrison (Romania) Cristina Dinu
March 12	Tampa, United States; Clay $15,000; Singles and doubles draws	(United States) Katerina Stewart; 6–2, 6–3	(United States) Jessica Pegula	(United States) Amanda Rodgers (Belarus) Ilona Kremen	(Georgia (country)) Salome Devidze (United States) Caty McNally (Bulgaria) Dia Evtimova (United States) Ingrid Neel
March 12	Tampa, United States; Clay $15,000; Singles and doubles draws	(United States) Caty McNally (United States) Natasha Subhash; 3–6, 6–3, [10–6]	(United States) Rasheeda McAdoo (United States) Katerina Stewart	(United States) Amanda Rodgers (Belarus) Ilona Kremen	(Georgia (country)) Salome Devidze (United States) Caty McNally (Bulgaria) Dia Evtimova (United States) Ingrid Neel
March 19	ACT Clay Court International; Canberra, Australia; Clay $60,000; Singles – Doubles	(Slovenia) Dalila Jakupović; 6–4, 6–4	(Australia) Destanee Aiava	(United Kingdom) Gabriella Taylor (Japan) Miyu Kato	(Australia) Abbie Myers (Australia) Lizette Cabrera (France) Shérazad Reix (Australia) Ellen Perez
March 19	ACT Clay Court International; Canberra, Australia; Clay $60,000; Singles – Doubles	(Australia) Priscilla Hon (Slovenia) Dalila Jakupović; 6–4, 4–6, [10–7]	(Japan) Miyu Kato (Japan) Makoto Ninomiya	(United Kingdom) Gabriella Taylor (Japan) Miyu Kato	(Australia) Abbie Myers (Australia) Lizette Cabrera (France) Shérazad Reix (Australia) Ellen Perez
March 19	Pula, Italy; Clay $25,000; Singles and doubles draws	(Serbia) Olga Danilović; 6–4, 6–3	(Italy) Federica Di Sarra	(Slovakia) Michaela Hončová (Switzerland) Patty Schnyder	(Germany) Katharina Hobgarski (Italy) Martina Caregaro (Liechtenstein) Kathinka von Deichmann (Bulgaria) Elitsa Kostova
March 19	Pula, Italy; Clay $25,000; Singles and doubles draws	(Slovakia) Chantal Škamlová (Netherlands) Eva Wacanno; 6–1, 5–7, [10–6]	(Georgia (country)) Sofia Shapatava (Ukraine) Anastasiya Vasylyeva	(Slovakia) Michaela Hončová (Switzerland) Patty Schnyder	(Germany) Katharina Hobgarski (Italy) Martina Caregaro (Liechtenstein) Kathinka von Deichmann (Bulgaria) Elitsa Kostova
March 19	Manama, Bahrain; Hard $15,000; Singles and doubles draws	(Slovenia) Nastja Kolar; 6–4, 6–2	(Slovakia) Tereza Mihalíková	(Netherlands) Quirine Lemoine (India) Kanika Vaidya	(United Kingdom) Emily Webley-Smith (Slovakia) Viktória Morvayová (Oman) Fatma Al-Nabhani (Montenegro) Ana Veselinović
March 19	Manama, Bahrain; Hard $15,000; Singles and doubles draws	(Oman) Fatma Al-Nabhani (Philippines) Marian Capadocia; 7–5, 6–2	(Zimbabwe) Valeria Bhunu (United Kingdom) Emily Webley-Smith	(Netherlands) Quirine Lemoine (India) Kanika Vaidya	(United Kingdom) Emily Webley-Smith (Slovakia) Viktória Morvayová (Oman) Fatma Al-Nabhani (Montenegro) Ana Veselinović
March 19	Nanjing, China; Hard $15,000; Singles and doubles draws	(China) Xun Fangying; 6–1, 6–1	(China) Ye Qiuyu	(China) Zhang Kailin (China) Guo Meiqi	(China) Gai Ao (China) Zheng Wushuang (United States) Amy Zhu (China) Yang Yidi
March 19	Nanjing, China; Hard $15,000; Singles and doubles draws	(China) Han Xinyun (China) Ye Qiuyu; 3–6, 6–3, [10–5]	(China) Sun Xuliu (China) Zhao Qianqian	(China) Zhang Kailin (China) Guo Meiqi	(China) Gai Ao (China) Zheng Wushuang (United States) Amy Zhu (China) Yang Yidi
March 19	Sharm El Sheikh, Egypt; Hard $15,000; Singles and doubles draws	(United Kingdom) Jodie Anna Burrage; 6–2, 6–1	(United States) Nadja Gilchrist	(Czech Republic) Barbora Štefková (Italy) Dalila Spiteri	(Georgia (country)) Mariam Bolkvadze (United States) Julia Elbaba (Germany) Irina Cantos Siemers (Slovakia) Natália Vajdová
March 19	Sharm El Sheikh, Egypt; Hard $15,000; Singles and doubles draws	(Thailand) Kamonwan Buayam (Russia) Angelina Gabueva; 7–5, 5–7, [10–7]	(United Kingdom) Jodie Anna Burrage (Sweden) Jacqueline Cabaj Awad	(Czech Republic) Barbora Štefková (Italy) Dalila Spiteri	(Georgia (country)) Mariam Bolkvadze (United States) Julia Elbaba (Germany) Irina Cantos Siemers (Slovakia) Natália Vajdová
March 19	Le Havre, France; Clay (indoor) $15,000; Singles and doubles draws	(Italy) Angelica Moratelli; 5–7, 6–1, 6–4	(France) Marine Partaud	(Sweden) Marina Yudanov (Latvia) Diāna Marcinkēviča	(United States) Chiara Scholl (Germany) Natalie Pröse (Italy) Michele Alexandra Zmău (Spain) Ángela Fita Boluda
March 19	Le Havre, France; Clay (indoor) $15,000; Singles and doubles draws	(Belgium) Lara Salden (France) Camille Sireix; 2–6, 6–2, [10–7]	(Germany) Tayisiya Morderger (Germany) Yana Morderger	(Sweden) Marina Yudanov (Latvia) Diāna Marcinkēviča	(United States) Chiara Scholl (Germany) Natalie Pröse (Italy) Michele Alexandra Zmău (Spain) Ángela Fita Boluda
March 19	Heraklion, Greece; Clay $15,000; Singles and doubles draws	(Switzerland) Ylena In-Albon; 4–6, 7–6^{(7–3)}, 6–1	(Hungary) Anna Bondár	(Romania) Elena-Teodora Cadar (Czech Republic) Monika Kilnarová	(Venezuela) Luniuska Delgado (Bulgaria) Julia Stamatova (Germany) Romy Kölzer (United Kingdom) Francesca Jones
March 19	Heraklion, Greece; Clay $15,000; Singles and doubles draws	(Denmark) Emilie Francati (Denmark) Maria Jespersen; 7–5, 4–6, [10–8]	(United Kingdom) Emily Appleton (Finland) Mia Eklund	(Romania) Elena-Teodora Cadar (Czech Republic) Monika Kilnarová	(Venezuela) Luniuska Delgado (Bulgaria) Julia Stamatova (Germany) Romy Kölzer (United Kingdom) Francesca Jones
March 19	Tel Aviv, Israel; Hard $15,000; Singles and doubles draws	(Belgium) Hélène Scholsen; 7–5, 6–4	(Germany) Caroline Werner	(Israel) Nicole Nadel (France) Elixane Lechemia	(United States) Madeleine Kobelt (United States) Dasha Ivanova (Russia) Ekaterina Yashina (Kazakhstan) Gozal Ainitdinova
March 19	Tel Aviv, Israel; Hard $15,000; Singles and doubles draws	(United Kingdom) Alicia Barnett (United Kingdom) Olivia Nicholls; 7–6^{(7–3)}, 6–3	(France) Mathilde Armitano (France) Elixane Lechemia	(Israel) Nicole Nadel (France) Elixane Lechemia	(United States) Madeleine Kobelt (United States) Dasha Ivanova (Russia) Ekaterina Yashina (Kazakhstan) Gozal Ainitdinova
March 19	Nishitama, Japan; Hard $15,000; Singles and doubles draws	(South Korea) Lee So-ra; 6–3, 2–6, 7–5	(South Korea) Kim Na-ri	(South Korea) Kim Da-bin (Japan) Risa Ushijima	(Japan) Ayaka Okuno (Germany) Sarah-Rebecca Sekulic (Hong Kong) Zhang Ling (Italy) Giulia Gatto-Monticone
March 19	Nishitama, Japan; Hard $15,000; Singles and doubles draws	(South Korea) Kim Na-ri (South Korea) Lee So-ra; 6–4, 7–5	(Japan) Chisa Hosonuma (Japan) Kanako Morisaki	(South Korea) Kim Da-bin (Japan) Risa Ushijima	(Japan) Ayaka Okuno (Germany) Sarah-Rebecca Sekulic (Hong Kong) Zhang Ling (Italy) Giulia Gatto-Monticone
March 19	Hammamet, Tunisia; Clay $15,000; Singles and doubles draws	(Paraguay) Montserrat González; 7–6^{(7–4)}, 6–2	(Bulgaria) Isabella Shinikova	(Spain) Eva Guerrero Álvarez (Spain) Claudia Hoste Ferrer	(Switzerland) Leonie Küng (Spain) Irene Burillo Escorihuela (Romania) Oana Georgeta Simion (United States) Jessica Ho
March 19	Hammamet, Tunisia; Clay $15,000; Singles and doubles draws	(Paraguay) Montserrat González (Brazil) Laura Pigossi; 6–2, 6–0	(Italy) Camilla Scala (Bulgaria) Isabella Shinikova	(Spain) Eva Guerrero Álvarez (Spain) Claudia Hoste Ferrer	(Switzerland) Leonie Küng (Spain) Irene Burillo Escorihuela (Romania) Oana Georgeta Simion (United States) Jessica Ho
March 19	Antalya, Turkey; Clay $15,000; Singles and doubles draws	(Slovakia) Rebecca Šramková; 6–1, 7–5	(Sweden) Cornelia Lister	(Romania) Andreea Amalia Roșca (Bulgaria) Petia Arshinkova	(Switzerland) Xenia Knoll (Sweden) Fanny Östlund (Slovenia) Veronika Erjavec (Slovakia) Vivien Juhászová
March 19	Antalya, Turkey; Clay $15,000; Singles and doubles draws	(Sweden) Fanny Östlund (Romania) Andreea Amalia Roșca; 6–3, 4–6, [10–7]	(Romania) Ilona Georgiana Ghioroaie (France) Victoria Muntean	(Romania) Andreea Amalia Roșca (Bulgaria) Petia Arshinkova	(Switzerland) Xenia Knoll (Sweden) Fanny Östlund (Slovenia) Veronika Erjavec (Slovakia) Vivien Juhászová
March 26	Open de Seine-et-Marne; Croissy-Beaubourg, France; Hard (indoor) $60,000; Singles – Doubles	(Russia) Anna Blinkova; Walkover	(Czech Republic) Karolína Muchová	(Russia) Anna Kalinskaya (Poland) Magdalena Fręch	(France) Jessika Ponchet (Russia) Vera Zvonareva (Russia) Vitalia Diatchenko (Germany) Tamara Korpatsch
March 26	Open de Seine-et-Marne; Croissy-Beaubourg, France; Hard (indoor) $60,000; Singles – Doubles	(Russia) Anna Kalinskaya (Slovakia) Viktória Kužmová; 7–6^{(7–5)}, 6–1	(Czech Republic) Petra Krejsová (Czech Republic) Jesika Malečková	(Russia) Anna Kalinskaya (Poland) Magdalena Fręch	(France) Jessika Ponchet (Russia) Vera Zvonareva (Russia) Vitalia Diatchenko (Germany) Tamara Korpatsch
March 26	ACT Clay Court International; Canberra, Australia; Clay $25,000; Singles and doubles draws	(Australia) Jaimee Fourlis; 6–3, 6–2	(Australia) Ellen Perez	(Australia) Zoe Hives (Japan) Eri Hozumi	(United Kingdom) Gabriella Taylor (France) Shérazad Reix (China) Lu Jiajing (United Kingdom) Katy Dunne
March 26	ACT Clay Court International; Canberra, Australia; Clay $25,000; Singles and doubles draws	(Romania) Irina Fetecău (Australia) Kaylah McPhee; 6–1, 4–6, [10–5]	(Austria) Pia König (Japan) Michika Ozeki	(Australia) Zoe Hives (Japan) Eri Hozumi	(United Kingdom) Gabriella Taylor (France) Shérazad Reix (China) Lu Jiajing (United Kingdom) Katy Dunne
March 26	Pula, Italy; Clay $25,000; Singles and doubles draws	(Luxembourg) Mandy Minella; 6–3, 7–6^{(9–7)}	(Italy) Deborah Chiesa	(Slovenia) Tamara Zidanšek (Russia) Valentyna Ivakhnenko	(Netherlands) Richèl Hogenkamp (Russia) Veronika Kudermetova (Italy) Federica Di Sarra (Montenegro) Danka Kovinić
March 26	Pula, Italy; Clay $25,000; Singles and doubles draws	(Russia) Valentyna Ivakhnenko (Russia) Valeriya Solovyeva; 6–3, 3–6, [10–5]	(Italy) Anastasia Grymalska (Czech Republic) Anastasia Zarycká	(Slovenia) Tamara Zidanšek (Russia) Valentyna Ivakhnenko	(Netherlands) Richèl Hogenkamp (Russia) Veronika Kudermetova (Italy) Federica Di Sarra (Montenegro) Danka Kovinić
March 26	Kōfu International Open; Kōfu, Japan; Hard $25,000; Singles and doubles draws	(Thailand) Luksika Kumkhum; 6–3, 6–3	(Canada) Bianca Andreescu	(China) Zhu Lin (India) Ankita Raina	(Canada) Rebecca Marino (China) Liu Fangzhou (India) Karman Thandi (Italy) Giulia Gatto-Monticone
March 26	Kōfu International Open; Kōfu, Japan; Hard $25,000; Singles and doubles draws	(China) Gao Xinyu (Thailand) Luksika Kumkhum; 6–0, 2–6, [10–4]	(Japan) Erina Hayashi (Japan) Momoko Kobori	(China) Zhu Lin (India) Ankita Raina	(Canada) Rebecca Marino (China) Liu Fangzhou (India) Karman Thandi (Italy) Giulia Gatto-Monticone
March 26	Nanjing, China; Hard $15,000; Singles and doubles draws	(China) Xun Fangying; 6–4, 6–3	(China) Han Xinyun	(China) You Xiaodi (Chinese Taipei) Lee Pei-chi	(Indonesia) Aldila Sutjiadi (China) Zheng Qinwen (Chinese Taipei) Joanna Garland (China) Guo Shanshan
March 26	Nanjing, China; Hard $15,000; Singles and doubles draws	(China) Feng Shuo (China) Zheng Wushuang; 6–2, 6–4	(China) Sun Xuliu (China) Zhao Qianqian	(China) You Xiaodi (Chinese Taipei) Lee Pei-chi	(Indonesia) Aldila Sutjiadi (China) Zheng Qinwen (Chinese Taipei) Joanna Garland (China) Guo Shanshan
March 26	Sharm El Sheikh, Egypt; Hard $15,000; Singles and doubles draws	(Slovenia) Nastja Kolar; 2–6, 6–4, 6–0	(Russia) Angelina Gabueva	(Czech Republic) Barbora Štefková (United Kingdom) Jodie Anna Burrage	(Georgia (country)) Mariam Bolkvadze (Belarus) Yuliya Hatouka (United States) Julia Elbaba (Belgium) Greet Minnen
March 26	Sharm El Sheikh, Egypt; Hard $15,000; Singles and doubles draws	(Georgia (country)) Mariam Bolkvadze (Czech Republic) Barbora Štefková; 6–2, 7–6^{(8–6)}	(Colombia) María Paulina Pérez (Colombia) Paula Andrea Pérez	(Czech Republic) Barbora Štefková (United Kingdom) Jodie Anna Burrage	(Georgia (country)) Mariam Bolkvadze (Belarus) Yuliya Hatouka (United States) Julia Elbaba (Belgium) Greet Minnen
March 26	Heraklion, Greece; Clay $15,000; Singles and doubles draws	(Czech Republic) Monika Kilnarová; 6–3, 6–3	(Switzerland) Lisa Sabino	(Switzerland) Ylena In-Albon (Germany) Romy Kölzer	(Italy) Stefania Rubini (Finland) Mia Eklund (Russia) Victoria Kan (France) Joséphine Boualem
March 26	Heraklion, Greece; Clay $15,000; Singles and doubles draws	(Denmark) Emilie Francati (Denmark) Maria Jespersen; 6–3, 6–1	(Belgium) Michaela Boev (Romania) Ioana Gaspar	(Switzerland) Ylena In-Albon (Germany) Romy Kölzer	(Italy) Stefania Rubini (Finland) Mia Eklund (Russia) Victoria Kan (France) Joséphine Boualem
March 26	Hammamet, Tunisia; Clay $15,000; Singles and doubles draws	(Bulgaria) Isabella Shinikova; 6–3, 7–5	(Spain) Yvonne Cavallé Reimers	(Paraguay) Montserrat González (Australia) Seone Mendez	(Spain) Irene Burillo Escorihuela (Spain) Marina Bassols Ribera (Spain) Eva Guerrero Álvarez (Italy) Anna-Giulia Remondina
March 26	Hammamet, Tunisia; Clay $15,000; Singles and doubles draws	(Bosnia and Herzegovina) Nefisa Berberović (Germany) Natalia Siedliska; 7–6^{(7–5)}, 6–2	(Spain) Alba Carrillo Marín (Spain) Yvonne Cavallé Reimers	(Paraguay) Montserrat González (Australia) Seone Mendez	(Spain) Irene Burillo Escorihuela (Spain) Marina Bassols Ribera (Spain) Eva Guerrero Álvarez (Italy) Anna-Giulia Remondina
March 26	Antalya, Turkey; Clay $15,000; Singles and doubles draws	(Romania) Andreea Amalia Roșca; 6–3, 6–4	(Russia) Varvara Flink	(Romania) Ilona Georgiana Ghioroaie (Ukraine) Valeriya Strakhova	(Hungary) Ágnes Bukta (Germany) Lisa Matviyenko (Turkey) İpek Öz (Turkey) Melis Sezer
March 26	Antalya, Turkey; Clay $15,000; Singles and doubles draws	(Russia) Ulyana Ayzatulina (Russia) Vlada Koval; 6–1, 6–4	(Slovenia) Veronika Erjavec (Slovenia) Nina Potočnik	(Romania) Ilona Georgiana Ghioroaie (Ukraine) Valeriya Strakhova	(Hungary) Ágnes Bukta (Germany) Lisa Matviyenko (Turkey) İpek Öz (Turkey) Melis Sezer
