= 2017 Engie Open Andrézieux-Bouthéon 42 – Doubles =

Doubles
- 2017 Engie Open Andrézieux-Bouthéon 42

Final
- Champions: (Germany) Nicola Geuer (Germany) Anna Zaja
- Runners-up: (Romania) Ana Bogdan (Romania) Ioana Loredana Roșca
- Score: 6–3, 2–2 ret.

Events
Singles	Doubles
← 2016 ·	Engie Open Andrézieux-Bouthéon 42	· 2018 →

Elise Mertens and An-Sophie Mestach were the defending champions, but both players chose not to participate.

Nicola Geuer and Anna Zaja won the title when Ana Bogdan and Ioana Loredana Roșca retired in the final at 6–3, 2–2.

== Seeds ==
1. (Switzerland) Xenia Knoll / (Czech Republic) Lenka Kunčíková (semifinals)
2. (Russia) Anna Kalinskaya / (Belarus) Lidziya Marozava (semifinals)
3. (Belarus) Ilona Kremen / (India) Prarthana Thombare (first round)
4. (Germany) Nicola Geuer / (Germany) Anna Zaja (champions)

== Draw ==
=== Key ===
- Q = Qualifier
- WC = Wild card
- LL = Lucky loser
- Alt = Alternate
- SE = Special exempt
- PR = Protected ranking
- ITF = ITF entry
- JE = Junior exempt
- w/o = Walkover
- r = Retired
- d = Defaulted
- SR = Special ranking

First round
1	(Switzerland) X Knoll (Czech Republic) L Kunčíková	4	6	[11]
(Italy) C Rosatello (Liechtenstein) K von Deichmann	6	1	[9]
(Latvia) D Marcinkēviča (Netherlands) E Wacanno	1	5
WC	(United Kingdom) L Robson (Netherlands) B Schoofs	6	7
3	(Belarus) I Kremen (India) P Thombare	3	4
WC	(Romania) A Bogdan (Romania) IL Roșca	6	6
(France) C Paquet (Slovakia) R Šramková	7^{8}	6
WC	(France) M Armitano (Spain) C Bucșa	6^{6}	2
(Russia) A Gabueva (Georgia (country)) S Shapatava	1	2
(Netherlands) Q Lemoine (Sweden) C Lister	6	6
(Slovakia) M Hončová (France) S Reix	3	3
4	(Germany) N Geuer (Germany) A Zaja	6	6
(Uzbekistan) A Amanmuradova (Georgia (country)) E Gorgodze	6	7^{13}
(France) M Arcangioli (Switzerland) A Sadiković	3	6^{11}
(United States) E Bektas (United States) R Yurovsky	4	7	[6]
2	(Russia) A Kalinskaya (Belarus) L Marozava	6	5	[10]

Quarterfinals
1	(Switzerland) X Knoll (Czech Republic) L Kunčíková	6	6^{3}	[10]
WC	(United Kingdom) L Robson (Netherlands) B Schoofs	4	7^{7}	[4]
WC	(Romania) A Bogdan (Romania) IL Roșca	6	6^{3}	[10]
(France) C Paquet (Slovakia) R Šramková	2	7^{7}	[7]
(Netherlands) Q Lemoine (Sweden) C Lister	4	2
4	(Germany) N Geuer (Germany) A Zaja	6	6
(Uzbekistan) A Amanmuradova (Georgia (country)) E Gorgodze	3	4
2	(Russia) A Kalinskaya (Belarus) L Marozava	6	6

Semifinals
1	(Switzerland) X Knoll (Czech Republic) L Kunčíková	2	4
WC	(Romania) A Bogdan (Romania) IL Roșca	6	6
4	(Germany) N Geuer (Germany) A Zaja	6	7
2	(Russia) A Kalinskaya (Belarus) L Marozava	3	5

Final
WC	(Romania) A Bogdan (Romania) IL Roșca	3	2^{r}
4	(Germany) N Geuer (Germany) A Zaja	6	2
