= 2017 Engie Open Andrézieux-Bouthéon 42 – Singles =

Singles
- 2017 Engie Open Andrézieux-Bouthéon 42

Final
- Champion: (Estonia) Anett Kontaveit
- Runner-up: (Serbia) Ivana Jorović
- Score: 6–4, 7–6^{(7–5)}

Events
Singles	Doubles
← 2016 ·	Engie Open Andrézieux-Bouthéon 42	· 2018 →

Stefanie Vögele was the defending champion, but chose not to participate.

Anett Kontaveit won the title, defeating Ivana Jorović in the final 6–4, 7–6^{(7–5)}.

== Seeds ==
1. (Spain) Sara Sorribes Tormo (second round)
2. (Slovakia) Rebecca Šramková (second round)
3. (Estonia) Anett Kontaveit (champion)
4. (Spain) Sílvia Soler Espinosa (first round)
5. (Romania) Ana Bogdan (first round)
6. (Netherlands) Cindy Burger (first round)
7. (Serbia) Ivana Jorović (final)
8. (Germany) Tamara Korpatsch (quarterfinals)

== Main draw ==
=== Key ===
- Q = Qualifier
- WC = Wild card
- LL = Lucky loser
- Alt = Alternate
- SE = Special exempt
- PR = Protected ranking
- ITF = ITF entry
- JE = Junior exempt
- w/o = Walkover
- r = Retired
- d = Defaulted
- SR = Special ranking

=== Finals ===
Semifinals
(Switzerland) Amra Sadiković	1	2
3	(Estonia) Anett Kontaveit	6	6
(Czech Republic) Tereza Smitková	2	1
7	(Serbia) Ivana Jorović	6	6

Final
3	(Estonia) Anett Kontaveit	6	7^{7}
7	(Serbia) Ivana Jorović	4	6^{5}

=== Top half ===
First round
1	(Spain) S Sorribes Tormo	3	7	3
(Russia) M Melnikova	6	5	0^{r}
(Switzerland) A Sadiković	6	6
(France) V Razzano	2	1
(Italy) M Trevisan	4	6	4
(Netherlands) Q Lemoine	6	2	6
(United Kingdom) L Robson	6	6
6	(Netherlands) C Burger	4	4
3	(Estonia) A Kontaveit	6	7
(Georgia (country)) S Shapatava	3	5
(Liechtenstein) K von Deichmann	3	6	6
(Italy) J Paolini	6	3	2
LL	(Uzbekistan) A Amanmuradova	6	6^{4}	6
Q	(Netherlands) B Schoofs	3	7^{7}	3
(Netherlands) L Kerkhove	4	5
8	(Germany) T Korpatsch	6	7

Second round
1	(Spain) S Sorribes Tormo	5	6^{4}
(Switzerland) A Sadiković	7	7^{7}
(Netherlands) Q Lemoine	4	0
(United Kingdom) L Robson	6	6
3	(Estonia) A Kontaveit	7^{7}	4	6
(Liechtenstein) K von Deichmann	6^{4}	6	4
LL	(Uzbekistan) A Amanmuradova	1	2
8	(Germany) T Korpatsch	6	6

Quarterfinals
(Switzerland) A Sadiković	7^{7}	6
(United Kingdom) L Robson	6^{5}	3
3	(Estonia) A Kontaveit	7	6
8	(Germany) T Korpatsch	5	3

Semifinals
(Switzerland) A Sadiković	1	2
3	(Estonia) A Kontaveit	6	6

=== Bottom half ===
First round
5	(Romania) A Bogdan	3	7^{8}	4
Q	(United States) B Pera	6	6^{6}	6
WC	(France) C Paquet	4	1
WC	(France) L Brouleau	6	6
(Russia) A Kalinskaya	6	6
WC	(France) M Arcangioli	4	3
(Czech Republic) T Smitková	6	6
4	(Spain) S Soler Espinosa	1	4
7	(Serbia) I Jorović	6^{5}	6	6
(Ukraine) V Strakhova	7^{7}	0	2
(France) S Reix	1	3
Q	(Poland) M Fręch	6	6
Q	(Ukraine) D Yastremska	4	2
(Czech Republic) T Martincová	6	6
WC	(France) H Tan	6^{2}	2
2	(Slovakia) R Šramková	7^{7}	6

Second round
Q	(United States) B Pera	4	7	4
WC	(France) L Brouleau	6	5	6
(Russia) A Kalinskaya	2	4
(Czech Republic) T Smitková	6	6
7	(Serbia) I Jorović	6	6
Q	(Poland) M Fręch	4	1
(Czech Republic) T Martincová	4	6	6
2	(Slovakia) R Šramková	6	4	4

Quarterfinals
WC	(France) L Brouleau	4	3
(Czech Republic) T Smitková	6	6
7	(Serbia) I Jorović	6	2	6
(Czech Republic) T Martincová	3	6	4

Semifinals
(Czech Republic) T Smitková	2	1
7	(Serbia) I Jorović	6	6
