= 2019 Engie Open Andrézieux-Bouthéon 42 =

- Date: 21–27 January 2019
- Edition: 9th
- Category: ITF Women's World Tennis Tour (W60)
- Prize money: $60,000
- Surface: Hard / Indoor
- Location: Andrézieux-Bouthéon, France

Champions

Singles
- (Slovakia) Rebecca Šramková

Doubles
- (Sweden) Cornelia Lister / (Czech Republic) Renata Voráčová
← 2018 ·	Open Andrézieux-Bouthéon 42	· 2020 →

The 2019 Engie Open Andrézieux-Bouthéon 42 was a professional tennis tournament played on indoor hard courts. It was the ninth edition of the tournament which was part of the 2019 ITF Women's World Tennis Tour. It took place in Andrézieux-Bouthéon, France between 21 and 27 January 2019.

== Women's singles main-draw entrants ==
=== Seeds ===
Country	Player	Rank^{1}	Seed
SLO	Polona Hercog	92	1
GER	Tamara Korpatsch	120	2
RUS	Vitalia Diatchenko	130	3
BEL	Ysaline Bonaventure	159	4
NED	Bibiane Schoofs	160	5
ESP	Aliona Bolsova Zadoinov	166	6
UKR	Katarina Zavatska	181	7
ITA	Martina Di Giuseppe	192	8

- ^{1} Rankings are as of 14 January 2019.

=== Other entrants ===
The following players received wildcards into the singles main draw:

- (France) Tessah Andrianjafitrimo
- (France) Clara Burel
- (France) Julie Gervais
- (Slovenia) Polona Hercog

The following players received entry from the qualifying draw:

- (France) Audrey Albié
- (Spain) Cristina Bucșa
- (France) Gaëlle Desperrier
- (Italy) Federica Di Sarra
- (North Macedonia) Lina Gjorcheska
- (United States) Maria Sanchez

== Champions ==
=== Singles ===
- (Slovakia) Rebecca Šramková def. (France) Audrey Albié, 6–2, 6–7^{(4–7)}, 6–2

=== Doubles ===
- (Sweden) Cornelia Lister / (Czech Republic) Renata Voráčová def. (Romania) Andreea Mitu / (Romania) Elena-Gabriela Ruse, 6–1, 6–2
