= 2018 Engie Open Andrézieux-Bouthéon 42 – Doubles =

Doubles
- 2018 Engie Open Andrézieux-Bouthéon 42

Final
- Champions: (Belgium) Ysaline Bonaventure (Netherlands) Bibiane Schoofs
- Runners-up: (Italy) Camilla Rosatello (Belgium) Kimberley Zimmermann
- Score: 4–6, 7–5, [10–7]

Events
Singles	Doubles
← 2017 ·	Open Andrézieux-Bouthéon 42	· 2019 →

Nicola Geuer and Anna Zaja were the defending champions, but Zaja chose not to participate. Geuer played alongside Cornelia Lister, but lost in the semifinals to Ysaline Bonaventure and Bibiane Schoofs.

Bonaventure and Schoofs won the title after defeating Camilla Rosatello and Kimberley Zimmermann 4–6, 7–5, [10–7] in the final.

== Seeds ==
1. (Germany) Nicola Geuer / (Sweden) Cornelia Lister (semifinals)
2. (Netherlands) Arantxa Rus / (Netherlands) Eva Wacanno (first round)
3. (Belgium) Ysaline Bonaventure / (Netherlands) Bibiane Schoofs (champions)
4. (Spain) Cristina Bucșa / (Russia) Yana Sizikova (semifinals)

== Draw ==
=== Key ===
- Q = Qualifier
- WC = Wild card
- LL = Lucky loser
- Alt = Alternate
- SE = Special exempt
- PR = Protected ranking
- ITF = ITF entry
- JE = Junior exempt
- w/o = Walkover
- r = Retired
- d = Defaulted
- SR = Special ranking

=== Draw ===
First round
1	(Germany) N Geuer (Sweden) C Lister	3	6	[10]
(United States) J Elbaba (India) K Thandi	6	2	[6]
(Romania) A Cadanțu (Czech Republic) T Smitková	2	4
(United Kingdom) T Moore (Switzerland) A Sadiković	6	6
3	(Belgium) Y Bonaventure (Netherlands) B Schoofs	6	2	[10]
(France) M Arcangioli (France) S Reix	2	6	[4]
WC	(France) A Albié (France) M Armitano	4	4
(Russia) A Frolova (Russia) A Silich	6	6
(France) C Paquet (France) P Parmentier	5	2
(Italy) G Brescia (Switzerland) C Perrin	7	6
(Slovakia) J Čepelová (Slovakia) V Kužmová	3	7^{7}	[10]
4	(Spain) C Bucșa (Russia) Y Sizikova	6	6^{5}	[12]
(Russia) O Doroshina (Russia) V Solovyeva	6	3	[11]
(Russia) K Bekker (Netherlands) E Vogelsang	1	6	[9]
(Italy) C Rosatello (Belgium) K Zimmermann	6	7^{7}
2	(Netherlands) A Rus (Netherlands) E Wacanno	2	6^{3}

Quarterfinals
1	(Germany) N Geuer (Sweden) C Lister	5	6	[10]
(United Kingdom) T Moore (Switzerland) A Sadiković	7	4	[8]
3	(Belgium) Y Bonaventure (Netherlands) B Schoofs	6	6
(Russia) A Frolova (Russia) A Silich	4	2
(Italy) G Brescia (Switzerland) C Perrin	2	4
4	(Spain) C Bucșa (Russia) Y Sizikova	6	6
(Russia) O Doroshina (Russia) V Solovyeva	6^{5}	2
(Italy) C Rosatello (Belgium) K Zimmermann	7^{7}	6

Semifinals
1	(Germany) N Geuer (Sweden) C Lister	3	2
3	(Belgium) Y Bonaventure (Netherlands) B Schoofs	6	6
4	(Spain) C Bucșa (Russia) Y Sizikova	1	4
(Italy) C Rosatello (Belgium) K Zimmermann	6	6

Final
3	(Belgium) Y Bonaventure (Netherlands) B Schoofs	4	7	[10]
(Italy) C Rosatello (Belgium) K Zimmermann	6	5	[7]
