= 2019 Engie Open Andrézieux-Bouthéon 42 – Doubles =

Doubles
- 2019 Engie Open Andrézieux-Bouthéon 42

Final
- Champions: (Sweden) Cornelia Lister (Czech Republic) Renata Voráčová
- Runners-up: (Romania) Andreea Mitu (Romania) Elena-Gabriela Ruse
- Score: 6–1, 6–2

Events
Singles	Doubles
← 2018 ·	Open Andrézieux-Bouthéon 42	· 2020 →

Ysaline Bonaventure and Bibiane Schoofs were the defending champions, but Bonaventure chose not to participate. Schoofs played alongside Olga Doroshina, but lost in the first round to Audrey Albié and Margot Yerolymos.

Cornelia Lister and Renata Voráčová won the title, defeating Andreea Mitu and Elena-Gabriela Ruse in the final, 6–1, 6–2.

== Seeds ==
1. (Sweden) Cornelia Lister / (Czech Republic) Renata Voráčová (champions)
2. (Russia) Olga Doroshina / (Netherlands) Bibiane Schoofs (first round)
3. (Romania) Andreea Mitu / (Romania) Elena-Gabriela Ruse (final)
4. (Canada) Sharon Fichman / (United States) Maria Sanchez (quarterfinals)

== Draw ==
=== Key ===
- Q = Qualifier
- WC = Wild card
- LL = Lucky loser
- Alt = Alternate
- SE = Special exempt
- PR = Protected ranking
- ITF = ITF entry
- JE = Junior exempt
- w/o = Walkover
- r = Retired
- d = Defaulted
- SR = Special ranking

=== Draw ===
First round
1	(Sweden) C Lister (Czech Republic) R Voráčová	7^{7}	4	[10]
(Germany) K Hobgarski (Bulgaria) I Shinikova	6^{4}	6	[8]
(France) M Georges (France) A Hesse	1	7^{8}	[10]
(Poland) M Chwalińska (United Kingdom) M Lumsden	6	6^{6}	[6]
4	(Canada) S Fichman (United States) M Sanchez	6	6
(France) M Arcangioli (France) S Reix	3	4
(Spain) A Bolsova Zadoinov (Venezuela) A Gámiz	3	6	[8]
(France) E Cascino (France) E Lechemia	6	0	[10]
(Belarus) S Pirazhenka (Slovakia) R Šramková	6	3	[6]
(Turkey) B Cengiz (United Kingdom) K Dunne	4	6	[10]
(Germany) A Lottner (Slovakia) C Škamlová	1	2
3	(Romania) A Mitu (Romania) E-G Ruse	6	6
WC	(France) T Andrianjafitrimo (France) C Burel	6^{5}	6	[8]
(Italy) M Caregaro (Italy) F Di Sarra	7^{7}	3	[10]
(France) A Albié (France) M Yerolymos	7	7^{7}
2	(Russia) O Doroshina (Netherlands) B Schoofs	5	6^{5}

Quarterfinals
1	(Sweden) C Lister (Czech Republic) R Voráčová	6	1	[11]
(France) M Georges (France) A Hesse	2	6	[9]
4	(Canada) S Fichman (United States) M Sanchez	6^{6}	6^{3}
(France) E Cascino (France) E Lechemia	7^{8}	7^{7}
(Turkey) B Cengiz (United Kingdom) K Dunne
3	(Romania) A Mitu (Romania) E-G Ruse	w/o
(Italy) M Caregaro (Italy) F Di Sarra	5	7^{7}	[10]
(France) A Albié (France) M Yerolymos	7	6^{5}	[5]

Semifinals
1	(Sweden) C Lister (Czech Republic) R Voráčová	6	5	[10]
(France) E Cascino (France) E Lechemia	3	7	[6]
3	(Romania) A Mitu (Romania) E-G Ruse	6	6
(Italy) M Caregaro (Italy) F Di Sarra	3	3

Final
1	(Sweden) C Lister (Czech Republic) R Voráčová	6	6
3	(Romania) A Mitu (Romania) E-G Ruse	1	2
