= 2016 Engie Open Métropole 42 =

- Date: 25–31 January
- Edition: 6th
- Category: ITF Women's Circuit
- Prize money: $50,000
- Surface: Hard / Indoor
- Location: Andrézieux-Bouthéon, France

Champions

Singles
- (Switzerland) Stefanie Vögele

Doubles
- (Belgium) Elise Mertens / (Belgium) An-Sophie Mestach
← 2015 ·	Engie Open Métropole 42	· 2017 →

The 2016 Engie Open Métropole 42 was a professional tennis tournament played on indoor hard courts. It was the sixth edition of the tournament and part of the 2016 ITF Women's Circuit, offering a total of $50,000 in prize money. It took place in Andrézieux-Bouthéon, France, on 25–31 January 2016.

== Singles main draw entrants ==
=== Seeds ===
Country	Player	Rank^{1}	Seed
ROU	Andreea Mitu	96	1
SUI	Stefanie Vögele	118	2
SUI	Romina Oprandi	124	3
CZE	Tereza Smitková	131	4
TUR	Çağla Büyükakçay	134	5
UKR	Maryna Zanevska	146	6
FRA	Océane Dodin	147	7
CRO	Petra Martić	148	8

- ^{1} Rankings as of 18 January 2016.

=== Other entrants ===
The following players received wildcards into the singles main draw:

- (France) Myrtille Georges
- (France) Shérazad Reix
- (France) Caroline Roméo
- (France) Carla Touly

The following players received entry from the qualifying draw:

- (Russia) Ekaterina Alexandrova
- (Italy) Alberta Brianti
- (Slovenia) Dalila Jakupović
- (Netherlands) Arantxa Rus

The following player received entry using a junior exempt:

- (Russia) Anna Blinkova

== Champions ==
=== Singles ===
- (Switzerland) Stefanie Vögele def. (Belgium) An-Sophie Mestach, 6–1, 6–2

=== Doubles ===
- (Belgium) Elise Mertens / (Belgium) An-Sophie Mestach def. (Switzerland) Viktorija Golubic / (Switzerland) Xenia Knoll, 6–4, 3–6, [10–7]
