= 2018 Engie Open Andrézieux-Bouthéon 42 – Singles =

Singles
- 2018 Engie Open Andrézieux-Bouthéon 42

Final
- Champion: (Spain) Georgina García Pérez
- Runner-up: (Netherlands) Arantxa Rus
- Score: 6–2, 6–0

Events
Singles	Doubles
← 2017 ·	Open Andrézieux-Bouthéon 42	· 2019 →

Anett Kontaveit was the defending champion, however she chose not to participate.

Georgina García Pérez won the title after defeating Arantxa Rus 6–2, 6–0 in the final.

== Seeds ==
1. (France) Pauline Parmentier (first round)
2. (Slovakia) Jana Čepelová (first round)
3. (Slovakia) Viktória Kužmová (first round)
4. (Netherlands) Arantxa Rus (final)
5. (Czech Republic) Tereza Martincová (second round)
6. (Germany) Antonia Lottner (first round)
7. (Italy) Jasmine Paolini (first round)
8. (Poland) Magdalena Fręch (semifinals)

== Draw ==
=== Key ===
- Q = Qualifier
- WC = Wild card
- LL = Lucky loser
- Alt = Alternate
- SE = Special exempt
- PR = Protected ranking
- ITF = ITF entry
- JE = Junior exempt
- w/o = Walkover
- r = Retired
- d = Defaulted
- SR = Special ranking

=== Finals ===
Semifinals
WC	(France) Fiona Ferro	1	0
4	(Netherlands) Arantxa Rus	6	6
8	(Poland) Magdalena Fręch	4	6	3
(Spain) Georgina García Pérez	6	1	6

Final
4	(Netherlands) Arantxa Rus	2	0
(Spain) Georgina García Pérez	6	6

=== Top half ===
First round
1/WC	(France) P Parmentier	6	6^{1}	2
(Liechtenstein) K von Deichmann	3	7^{7}	6
WC	(France) F Ferro	7^{7}	6
(Belgium) Y Bonaventure	6^{0}	2
(Netherlands) B Schoofs	4	6	6
(Slovakia) M Hončová	6	1	0
Q	(Spain) C Bucșa	5	6	1
5	(Czech Republic) T Martincová	7	4	6
4	(Netherlands) A Rus	6	6
(Hungary) D Gálfi	3	0
Q	(France) M Arcangioli	2	6	7^{7}
(Romania) A Cadanțu	6	3	6^{0}
WC	(France) S Cakarevic	6	3	4
(Germany) T Korpatsch	2	6	6
(Italy) G Brescia	6	6
7	(Italy) J Paolini	3	4

Second round
(Liechtenstein) K von Deichmann	4	3
WC	(France) F Ferro	6	6
(Netherlands) B Schoofs	6	6
5	(Czech Republic) T Martincová	3	2
4	(Netherlands) A Rus	7^{7}	6
Q	(France) M Arcangioli	6^{2}	2
(Germany) T Korpatsch	6	6
(Italy) G Brescia	3	4

Quarterfinals
WC	(France) F Ferro	7	4	6
(Netherlands) B Schoofs	5	6	4
4	(Netherlands) A Rus	6	6
(Germany) T Korpatsch	2	4

Semifinals
WC	(France) F Ferro	1	0
4	(Netherlands) A Rus	6	6

=== Bottom half ===
First round
8	(Poland) M Fręch	6	5	7^{7}
(Switzerland) C Perrin	2	7	6^{5}
WC	(France) C Paquet	6	6
(Spain) O Sáez Larra	2	4
(Italy) D Chiesa	6	3	4
(France) S Reix	3	6	6
(Russia) V Diatchenko	6	3	6
3	(Slovakia) V Kužmová	2	6	3
6	(Germany) A Lottner	3	2
Q	(France) A Albié	6	6
(Switzerland) A Sadiković	6	1	3
(Czech Republic) T Smitková	3	6	6
Q	(France) H Tan	3	2
(Slovenia) T Zidanšek	6	6
(Spain) G García Pérez	6	7
2	(Slovakia) J Čepelová	3	5

Second round
8	(Poland) M Fręch	6	6
WC	(France) C Paquet	3	4
(France) S Reix	4	3
(Russia) V Diatchenko	6	6
Q	(France) A Albié	6	6
(Czech Republic) T Smitková	4	4
(Slovenia) T Zidanšek	2	3
(Spain) G García Pérez	6	6

Quarterfinals
8	(Poland) M Fręch	6	2
(Russia) V Diatchenko	3	2^{r}
Q	(France) A Albié	3	7	6^{3}
(Spain) G García Pérez	6	5	7^{7}

Semifinals
8	(Poland) M Fręch	4	6	3
(Spain) G García Pérez	6	1	6
