= 2019 Engie Open Andrézieux-Bouthéon 42 – Singles =

Singles
- 2019 Engie Open Andrézieux-Bouthéon 42

Final
- Champion: (Slovakia) Rebecca Šramková
- Runner-up: (France) Audrey Albié
- Score: 6–2, 6–7^{(4–7)}, 6–2

Events
Singles	Doubles
← 2018 ·	Open Andrézieux-Bouthéon 42	· 2020 →

Georgina García Pérez was the defending champion, but chose to participate at the 2019 Burnie International instead.

Rebecca Šramková won the title, defeating Audrey Albié in the final, 6–2, 6–7^{(4–7)}, 6–2.

== Seeds ==
1. (Slovenia) Polona Hercog (semifinals, retired)
2. (Germany) Tamara Korpatsch (second round)
3. (Russia) Vitalia Diatchenko (second round)
4. (Belgium) Ysaline Bonaventure (second round)
5. (Netherlands) Bibiane Schoofs (quarterfinals)
6. (Spain) Aliona Bolsova Zadoinov (first round)
7. (Ukraine) Katarina Zavatska (first round)
8. (Italy) Martina Di Giuseppe (first round)

== Draw ==
=== Key ===
- Q = Qualifier
- WC = Wild card
- LL = Lucky loser
- Alt = Alternate
- SE = Special exempt
- PR = Protected ranking
- ITF = ITF entry
- JE = Junior exempt
- w/o = Walkover
- r = Retired
- d = Defaulted
- SR = Special ranking

=== Finals ===
Semifinals
1/WC	(Slovenia) Polona Hercog	2	0^{r}
(Slovakia) Rebecca Šramková	6	0
Q	(France) Audrey Albié	7	3	6
(Bulgaria) Isabella Shinikova	5	6	2

Final
(Slovakia) Rebecca Šramková	6	6^{4}	6
Q	(France) Audrey Albié	2	7^{7}	2

=== Top half ===
First round
1/WC	(Slovenia) P Hercog	6	6
(Romania) E-G Ruse	4	4
WC	(France) T Andrianjafitrimo	6	3	1
Q	(United States) M Sanchez	1	6	6
WC	(France) C Burel	6	6
(United Kingdom) K Dunne	3	2
(France) M Georges	6	7
8	(Italy) M Di Giuseppe	4	5
3	(Russia) V Diatchenko	6	6
Q	(Italy) F Di Sarra	2	3
(Russia) O Doroshina	6	4	2
(Slovakia) R Šramková	3	6	6
WC	(France) J Gervais	7^{8}	2	7
Q	(France) G Desperrier	6^{6}	6	5
(Russia) M Melnikova	1	7^{9}	6
6	(Spain) A Bolsova Zadoinov	6	6^{7}	1

Second round
1/WC	(Slovenia) P Hercog	6	6
Q	(United States) M Sanchez	3	3
WC	(France) C Burel	3	1
(France) M Georges	6	6
3	(Russia) V Diatchenko	1	5
(Slovakia) R Šramková	6	7
WC	(France) J Gervais	7	6
(Russia) M Melnikova	5	3

Quarterfinals
1/WC	(Slovenia) P Hercog	6	4	6
(France) M Georges	2	6	4
(Slovakia) R Šramková	6	6
WC	(France) J Gervais	3	2

Semifinals
1/WC	(Slovenia) P Hercog	2	0^{r}
(Slovakia) R Šramková	6	0

=== Bottom half ===
First round
7	(Ukraine) K Zavatska	4	4
(Germany) A Lottner	6	6
(Germany) K Hobgarski	6	3	4
Q	(France) A Albié	2	6	6
Q	(North Macedonia) L Gjorcheska	3	3
(Italy) G Gatto-Monticone	6	6
(Italy) J Paolini	0	6^{2}
4	(Belgium) Y Bonaventure	6	7^{7}
5	(Netherlands) B Schoofs	6	6
(France) A Hesse	2	4
(Spain) O Sáez Larra	3	6	2
Q	(Spain) C Bucșa	6	4	6
(Czech Republic) A Zarycká	4	3
(Bulgaria) I Shinikova	6	6
(France) S Reix	5	2
2	(Germany) T Korpatsch	7	6

Second round
(Germany) A Lottner	3	4
Q	(France) A Albié	6	6
(Italy) G Gatto-Monticone	6	3	6
4	(Belgium) Y Bonaventure	4	6	3
5	(Netherlands) B Schoofs	6	4	6
Q	(Spain) C Bucșa	4	6	2
(Bulgaria) I Shinikova	6	7
2	(Germany) T Korpatsch	4	5

Quarterfinals
Q	(France) A Albié	3	6	6
(Italy) G Gatto-Monticone	6	2	1
5	(Netherlands) B Schoofs	4	2
(Bulgaria) I Shinikova	6	6

Semifinals
Q	(France) A Albié	7	3	6
(Bulgaria) I Shinikova	5	6	2
