= 2017 Engie Open Andrézieux-Bouthéon 42 =

- Date: 23–29 January
- Edition: 7th
- Category: ITF Women's Circuit
- Prize money: $60,000
- Surface: Hard / Indoor
- Location: Andrézieux-Bouthéon, France

Champions

Singles
- (Estonia) Anett Kontaveit

Doubles
- (Germany) Nicola Geuer / (Germany) Anna Zaja
← 2016 ·	Engie Open Andrézieux-Bouthéon 42	· 2018 →

The 2017 Engie Open Andrézieux-Bouthéon 42 was a professional tennis tournament played on indoor hard courts. It was the seventh edition of the tournament and part of the 2017 ITF Women's Circuit, offering a total of $60,000 in prize money. It took place in Andrézieux-Bouthéon, France, from 23–29 January 2017.

== Singles main draw entrants ==
=== Seeds ===
Country	Player	Rank^{1}	Seed
ESP	Sara Sorribes Tormo	106	1
SVK	Rebecca Šramková	120	2
EST	Anett Kontaveit	121	3
ESP	Sílvia Soler Espinosa	123	4
ROU	Ana Bogdan	125	5
NED	Cindy Burger	138	6
SRB	Ivana Jorović	148	7
GER	Tamara Korpatsch	156	8

- ^{1} Rankings as of 16 January 2017

=== Other entrants ===
The following players received wildcards into the singles main draw:

- (France) Manon Arcangioli
- (France) Lou Brouleau
- (France) Chloé Paquet
- (France) Harmony Tan

The following players received entry from the qualifying draw:

- (Poland) Magdalena Fręch
- (United States) Bernarda Pera
- (Netherlands) Bibiane Schoofs
- (Ukraine) Dayana Yastremska

The following player received entry as a lucky loser:

- (Uzbekistan) Akgul Amanmuradova

== Champions ==
=== Singles ===
- (Estonia) Anett Kontaveit def. (Serbia) Ivana Jorović, 6–4, 7–6^{(7–5)}

=== Doubles ===
- (Germany) Nicola Geuer / (Germany) Anna Zaja def. (Romania) Ana Bogdan / (Romania) Ioana Loredana Roșca, 6–3, 2–2 ret.
