= 2018 Engie Open Andrézieux-Bouthéon 42 =

- Date: 22–28 January
- Edition: 8th
- Category: ITF Women's Circuit
- Prize money: $60,000
- Surface: Hard / Indoor
- Location: Andrézieux-Bouthéon, France

Champions

Singles
- (Spain) Georgina García Pérez

Doubles
- (Belgium) Ysaline Bonaventure / (Netherlands) Bibiane Schoofs
← 2017 ·	Open Andrézieux-Bouthéon 42	· 2019 →

The 2018 Engie Open Andrézieux-Bouthéon 42 was a professional tennis tournament played on indoor hard courts. It was the eighth edition of the tournament and was part of the 2018 ITF Women's Circuit. It took place in Andrézieux-Bouthéon, France, on 22–28 January 2018.

== Singles main draw entrants ==
=== Seeds ===
Country	Player	Rank^{1}	Seed
FRA	Pauline Parmentier	82	1
SVK	Jana Čepelová	110	2
SVK	Viktória Kužmová	125	3
NED	Arantxa Rus	135	4
CZE	Tereza Martincová	143	5
GER	Antonia Lottner	152	6
ITA	Jasmine Paolini	156	7
POL	Magdalena Fręch	163	8

- ^{1} Rankings as of 15 January 2018.

=== Other entrants ===
The following players received a wildcard into the singles main draw:

- (France) Sara Cakarevic
- (France) Fiona Ferro
- (France) Chloé Paquet
- (France) Pauline Parmentier

The following players received entry from the qualifying draw:

- (France) Audrey Albié
- (France) Manon Arcangioli
- (Spain) Cristina Bucșa
- (France) Harmony Tan

== Champions ==
=== Singles ===
- (Spain) Georgina García Pérez def. (Netherlands) Arantxa Rus, 6–2, 6–0

=== Doubles ===
- (Belgium) Ysaline Bonaventure / (Netherlands) Bibiane Schoofs def. (Italy) Camilla Rosatello / (Belgium) Kimberley Zimmermann, 4–6, 7–5, [10–7]
