= 2016 Engie Open Métropole 42 – Doubles =

Doubles
- 2016 Engie Open Métropole 42

Final
- Champions: (Belgium) Elise Mertens (Belgium) An-Sophie Mestach
- Runners-up: (Switzerland) Viktorija Golubic (Switzerland) Xenia Knoll
- Score: 6–4, 3–6, [10–7]

Events
| Singles | Doubles |
| ← 2015 · | Engie Open Métropole 42 | · 2017 → |

Gioia Barbieri and Jeļena Ostapenko were the defending champions, but both players chose not to participate.

Belgian-duo Elise Mertens and An-Sophie Mestach won the title, defeating Swiss-duo Viktorija Golubic and Xenia Knoll in the final, 6–4, 3–6, [10–7].

== Seeds ==
1. (Belgium) Elise Mertens / (Belgium) An-Sophie Mestach (champions)
2. (France) Stéphanie Foretz / (France) Amandine Hesse (first round)
3. (Switzerland) Viktorija Golubic / (Switzerland) Xenia Knoll (final)
4. (Germany) Carolin Daniels / (Belarus) Lidziya Marozava (semifinals)

== Draw ==
=== Key ===
- Q = Qualifier
- WC = Wild card
- LL = Lucky loser
- Alt = Alternate
- SE = Special exempt
- PR = Protected ranking
- ITF = ITF entry
- JE = Junior exempt
- w/o = Walkover
- r = Retired
- d = Defaulted
- SR = Special ranking

First round
1 | (Belgium) E Mertens (Belgium) A-S Mestach | 6 | 6
(Spain) G García Pérez (Russia) P Leykina | 4 | 4
(Croatia) P Martić (Croatia) A Vrljić | 3 | 6 | [10]
(Austria) S Klemenschits (Germany) A Lottner | 6 | 4 | [3]
4 | (Germany) C Daniels (Belarus) L Marozava | 6 | 6
(Netherlands) L Kerkhove (Netherlands) A Rus | 4 | 3
(Slovenia) D Jakupović (Turkey) P Özgen | 7^{7} | 5 | [6]
(Netherlands) C Burger (Russia) E Yashina | 6^{1} | 7 | [10]
WC | (France) C Roméo (France) C Touly | 3 | 4
(Turkey) Ç Büyükakçay (Turkey) İ Soylu | 6 | 6
WC | (France) M Arcangioli (France) S Reix | 6 | 2 | [5]
3 | (Switzerland) V Golubic (Switzerland) X Knoll | 3 | 6 | [10]
WC | (France) M Georges (Bulgaria) I Shinikova | 6 | 6
(Russia) V Ivakhnenko (Georgia (country)) S Shapatava | 0 | 2
(France) A Lim (Romania) A Mitu | 6 | 6
2 | (France) S Foretz (France) A Hesse | 4 | 1

Quarterfinals
1 | (Belgium) E Mertens (Belgium) A-S Mestach | 6 | 6
(Croatia) P Martić (Croatia) A Vrljić | 2 | 2
4 | (Germany) C Daniels (Belarus) L Marozava | 6 | 3 | [10]
(Netherlands) C Burger (Russia) E Yashina | 4 | 6 | [2]
(Turkey) Ç Büyükakçay (Turkey) İ Soylu | 4 | 4
3 | (Switzerland) V Golubic (Switzerland) X Knoll | 6 | 6
WC | (France) M Georges (Bulgaria) I Shinikova | 2 | 4
(France) A Lim (Romania) A Mitu | 6 | 6

Semifinals
1 | (Belgium) E Mertens (Belgium) A-S Mestach | 6 | 6
4 | (Germany) C Daniels (Belarus) L Marozava | 2 | 1
3 | (Switzerland) V Golubic (Switzerland) X Knoll | 7^{7} | 5 | [10]
(France) A Lim (Romania) A Mitu | 6^{3} | 7 | [4]

Final
1 | (Belgium) E Mertens (Belgium) A-S Mestach | 6 | 3 | [10]
3 | (Switzerland) V Golubic (Switzerland) X Knoll | 4 | 6 | [7]
