= 2016 Engie Open Métropole 42 – Singles =

Singles
- 2016 Engie Open Métropole 42

Final
- Champion: (Switzerland) Stefanie Vögele
- Runner-up: (Belgium) An-Sophie Mestach
- Score: 6–1, 6–2

Events
Singles	Doubles
← 2015 ·	Engie Open Métropole 42	· 2017 →

Margarita Gasparyan was the defending champion, but chose not to participate.

Stefanie Vögele won the title, defeating An-Sophie Mestach in the final, 6–1, 6–2.

== Seeds ==
1. (Romania) Andreea Mitu (first round)
2. (Switzerland) Stefanie Vögele (champion)
3. (Switzerland) Romina Oprandi (first round)
4. (Czech Republic) Tereza Smitková (quarterfinals)
5. (Turkey) Çağla Büyükakçay (second round)
6. (Ukraine) Maryna Zanevska (first round)
7. (France) Océane Dodin (semifinals; retired)
8. (Croatia) Petra Martić (quarterfinals)

== Main draw ==
=== Key ===
- Q = Qualifier
- WC = Wild card
- LL = Lucky loser
- Alt = Alternate
- SE = Special exempt
- PR = Protected ranking
- ITF = ITF entry
- JE = Junior exempt
- w/o = Walkover
- r = Retired
- d = Defaulted
- SR = Special ranking

=== Finals ===
Semifinals
(Belgium) An-Sophie Mestach	3	7	7^{7}
JE	(Russia) Anna Blinkova	6	5	6^{5}
7	(France) Océane Dodin	2^{r}
2	(Switzerland) Stefanie Vögele	5

Final
(Belgium) An-Sophie Mestach	1	2
2	(Switzerland) Stefanie Vögele	6	6

=== Top half ===
First round
1	(Romania) A Mitu	2	4
(Belgium) A-S Mestach	6	6
(Russia) P Leykina	6	6
Q	(Slovenia) D Jakupović	2	2
(Spain) S Soler Espinosa	3	4
(France) A Hesse	6	6
(France) V Razzano	3	6	6
6	(Ukraine) M Zanevska	6	2	4
3	(Switzerland) R Oprandi	6	2	4
WC	(France) M Georges	4	6	6
JE	(Russia) A Blinkova	3	6	7
(Turkey) İ Soylu	6	4	5
(Czech Republic) T Martincová	6	4	4
Q	(Russia) E Alexandrova	2	6	6
(France) S Foretz	4	1
8	(Croatia) P Martić	6	6

Second round
(Belgium) A-S Mestach	6	6
(Russia) P Leykina	2	4
(France) A Hesse	6	6
(France) V Razzano	4	4
WC	(France) M Georges	6	0	2
JE	(Russia) A Blinkova	2	6	6
Q	(Russia) E Alexandrova	3	3
8	(Croatia) P Martić	6	6

Quarterfinals
(Belgium) A-S Mestach	6	6
(France) A Hesse	2	3
JE	(Russia) A Blinkova	6	6
8	(Croatia) P Martić	4	4

Semifinals
(Belgium) A-S Mestach	3	7	7^{7}
JE	(Russia) A Blinkova	6	5	6^{5}

=== Bottom half ===
First round
7	(France) O Dodin	7	7^{7}
(Spain) S Sorribes Tormo	5	6^{4}
Q	(Netherlands) A Rus	6	6
WC	(France) S Reix	0	4
WC	(France) C Roméo	6	6
WC	(France) C Touly	2	4
Q	(Italy) A Brianti	6	3	6^{9}
4	(Czech Republic) T Smitková	4	6	7^{11}
5	(Turkey) Ç Büyükakçay	6	6
(France) A Lim	2	1
(Netherlands) C Burger	3	4
(Switzerland) V Golubic	6	6
(Netherlands) L Kerkhove	6	3	1
(Switzerland) A Sadiković	1	6	6
(Belgium) E Mertens	1	4
2	(Switzerland) S Vögele	6	6

Second round
7	(France) O Dodin	6^{10}	6	7
Q	(Netherlands) A Rus	7^{12}	2	5
WC	(France) C Roméo	6^{3}	0
4	(Czech Republic) T Smitková	7^{7}	6
5	(Turkey) Ç Büyükakçay	3	3
(Switzerland) V Golubic	6	6
(Switzerland) A Sadiković	1	7^{16}	6^{3}
2	(Switzerland) S Vögele	6	6^{14}	7^{7}

Quarterfinals
7	(France) O Dodin	2	6	6
4	(Czech Republic) T Smitková	6	2	1
(Switzerland) V Golubic	2	6	4
2	(Switzerland) S Vögele	6	2	6

Semifinals
7	(France) O Dodin	2^{r}
2	(Switzerland) S Vögele	5
