= Nicola Geuer =

German tennis player

- Country (sports): Germany
- Born: 2 March 1988 (age 37); Duisburg, West Germany
- Height: 1.66 m (5 ft 5 in)
- Turned pro: 2005
- Plays: Right-handed (two-handed backhand)
- Prize money: $116,558

Singles
- Career record: 154–109
- Career titles: 4 ITF
- Highest ranking: No. 276 (10 May 2010)

Doubles
- Career record: 119–101
- Career titles: 10 ITF
- Highest ranking: No. 91 (9 October 2017)

Grand Slam doubles results
- Wimbledon: 1R (2018)

Nicola Geuer (German pronunciation: [ˈɡɔʏ̯ɐ]; born 2 March 1988) is a German former professional tennis player.

In her career, Geuer won four singles and ten doubles titles on the ITF Women's Circuit. On 10 May 2010, she reached her best singles ranking of world No. 276. On 9 October 2017, she peaked at No. 91 in the doubles rankings.

Geuer was coached by former German ATP player Karsten Braasch.

Since October 2014, she has played only in doubles competition, and since October 2019 only once, in Lyon, France.

== ITF Circuit finals ==
=== Singles: 7 (4–3) ===
Legend $100,000 tournaments $75,000 tournaments $50,000 tournaments $25,000 tournaments (1–0) $10,000 tournaments (3–3)	Finals by surface Hard (2–2) Clay (2–1) Grass (0–0) Carpet (0–0)

Result	W–L	Date	Tournament	Surface	Opponent	Score
Loss	0–1	13 October 2008	ITF Lisbon, Portugal	Hard	(France) Stéphanie Vongsouthi	3–6, 4–6
Win	1–1	27 October 2008	ITF Stockholm, Sweden	Hard (i)	(Sweden) Anna Brazhnikova	7–6^{(5)}, 1–6, 7–5
Win	2–1	2 February 2009	ITF Vale do Lobo, Portugal	Hard	(Belgium) Apollonia Melzani	4–6, 6–2, 6–3
Win	3–1	18 May 2009	ITF Telde, Spain	Clay	(Spain) Paula Fondevila Castro	5–7, 6–4, 6–3
Win	4–1	12 April 2010	ITF Tessenderlo, Belgium	Clay (i)	(Italy) Romina Oprandi	4–6, 6–2, 6–3
Loss	4–2	23 August 2010	ITF Enschede, Netherlands	Clay	(Netherlands) Bibiane Schoofs	1–6, 2–6
Loss	4–3	16 April 2012	ITF Antalya, Turkey	Hard	(Russia) Yana Buchina	3–6, 4–6

=== Doubles: 18 (10–8) ===
Legend $100,000 tournaments (0–2) $80,000 tournaments (0–0) $50/60,000 tournaments (1–1) $25,000 tournaments (6–2) $15,000 tournaments (1–1) $10,000 tournaments (2–2)	Finals by surface Hard (3–4) Clay (6–3) Grass (0–0) Carpet (1–1)

Result	W–L	Date	Tier	Tournament	Surface	Partner	Opponents	Score
Loss	0–1	11 August 2008	10,000	Reinert Open, Germany	Clay	(Germany) Laura Haberkorn	(France) Samantha Schoeffel (Netherlands) Bibiane Schoofs	6–4, 6–7^{(5)}, [5–10]
Win	1–1	25 January 2010	10,000	ITF Kaarst, Germany	Carpet (i)	(Germany) Lena-Marie Hofmann	(Germany) Kim Grajdek (Germany) Syna Kayser	6–4, 6–4
Win	2–1	16 April 2012	10,000	ITF Antalya, Turkey	Hard	(Austria) Janina Toljan	(United States) Lauren Megale (United States) Nicole Melichar	6–2, 6–2
Win	3–1	9 July 2012	25,000	ITF Zwevegem, Belgium	Clay	(Romania) Mihaela Buzărnescu	(Netherlands) Kim Kilsdonk (Netherlands) Nicolette van Uitert	7–6^{(5)}, 1–6, [10–4]
Win	4–1	11 March 2013	15,000	GB Pro-Series Bath, United Kingdom	Hard (i)	(United Kingdom) Lisa Whybourn	(Switzerland) Viktorija Golubic (Germany) Julia Kimmelmann	6–3, 6–4
Win	5–1	14 July 2014	25,000	ITF Darmstadt, Germany	Clay	(Switzerland) Viktorija Golubic	(Germany) Carolin Daniels (Germany) Laura Schaeder	5–7, 6–2, [10–3]
Loss	5–2	15 September 2014	25,000	GB Pro-Series Shrewsbury, United Kingdom	Hard (i)	(Switzerland) Viktorija Golubic	(Netherlands) Richèl Hogenkamp (Netherlands) Lesley Kerkhove	6–2, 5–7, [8–10]
Loss	5–3	19 January 2015	10,000	ITF Kaarst, Germany	Carpet (i)	(Germany) Carolin Daniels	(Poland) Natalia Siedliska (Netherlands) Mandy Wagemaker	6–3, 4–6, [4–10]
Loss	5–4	6 April 2015	15,000	ITF Dijon, France	Hard (i)	(Germany) Laura Schaeder	(Russia) Olga Doroshina (Belarus) Lidziya Marozava	6–4, 2–6, [2–10]
Win	6–4	8 June 2015	25,000	Bredeney Ladies Open, Germany	Clay	(Switzerland) Viktorija Golubic	(Germany) Carolin Daniels (Germany) Antonia Lottner	6–3, 6–3
Loss	6–5	9 May 2016	50,000+H	Open Saint-Gaudens, France	Clay	(Switzerland) Viktorija Golubic	(Netherlands) Demi Schuurs (Czech Republic) Renata Voráčová	1–6, 2–6
Win	7–5	11 July 2016	25,000	ITF Aschaffenburg, Germany	Clay	(Germany) Anna Zaja	(Slovenia) Dalila Jakupović (China) Lu Jiajing	6–4, 6–4
Loss	7–6	1 August 2016	25,000	ITF Bad Saulgau, Germany	Clay	(Germany) Anna Zaja	(Romania) Irina Bara (Ukraine) Oleksandra Korashvili	5–7, 6–4, [4–10]
Win	8–6	8 August 2016	25,000	Ladies Open Hechingen, Germany	Clay	(Germany) Anna Zaja	(Germany) Vivian Heisen (Austria) Pia König	6–3, 6–1
Win	9–6	15 August 2016	25,000	ITF Leipzig, Germany	Clay	(Germany) Anna Klasen	(Slovakia) Michaela Hončová (Ukraine) Olga Ianchuk	7–6^{(4)}, 7–5
Loss	9–7	24 October 2016	100,000	ITF Poitiers, France	Hard (i)	(Romania) Alexandra Cadanțu	(Japan) Nao Hibino (Poland) Alicja Rosolska	0–6, 0–6
Win	10–7	27 January 2017	60,000	Open Andrézieux-Bouthéon, France	Hard (i)	(Germany) Anna Zaja	(Romania) Ana Bogdan (Romania) Ioana Loredana Roșca	6–3, 2–2 ret.
Loss	10–8	28 October 2017	100,000	ITF Poitiers, France	Hard (i)	(Romania) Mihaela Buzărnescu	(Switzerland) Belinda Bencic (Belgium) Yanina Wickmayer	6–7^{(7)}, 3–6
