= Audrey Albié =

French tennis player (born 1994)

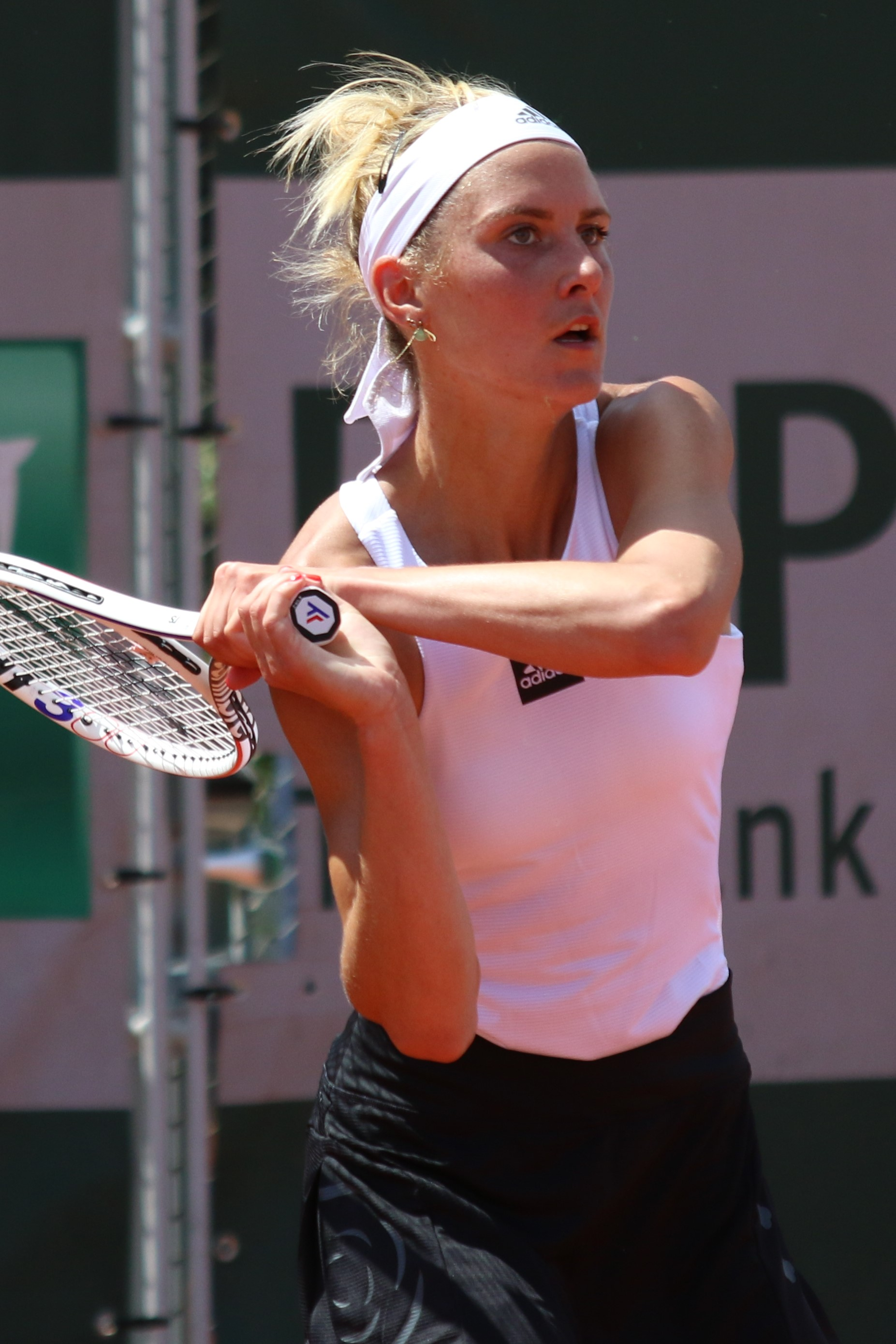
- Albié at the 2022 French Open
- Country (sports): France
- Born: 24 October 1994 (age 32)
- Plays: Right (two-handed backhand)
- Prize money: $287,893

Singles
- Career record: 296–241
- Career titles: 5 ITF
- Highest ranking: No. 221 (27 February 2023)

Grand Slam singles results
- French Open: 1R (2019)

Doubles
- Career record: 86–101
- Career titles: 4 ITF
- Highest ranking: No. 228 (28 February 2022)

Grand Slam doubles results
- French Open: 1R (2017)

Audrey Albié (born 24 October 1994) is a French inactive tennis player.

She has career-high WTA rankings of 221 in singles, achieved on 27 February 2023, and 228 in doubles, attained on 28 February 2022. During her career, Albié won five singles titles and four doubles titles at tournaments of the ITF Women's Circuit.

== Career ==
=== Professional ===
Albié made her major debut at the 2017 French Open, having received a wildcard entrance for the women's doubles draw. She and her partner Harmony Tan lost in the first round to Pauline Parmentier and Yanina Wickmayer. Albié also was given a wildcard entrance for the singles qualifying event of the same tournament, where she defeated world No. 186, Grace Min, in the first round, before losing to Virginie Razzano.

== Career statistics ==
=== ITF Circuit finals ===
==== Singles: 14 (5 titles, 9 runner-ups) ====
Legend W60 tournaments (0–2) W50 tournaments (0–1) W25/35 tournaments (2–2) W10/15 tournaments (3–4)	Finals by surface Hard (3–6) Clay (2–3)

Result	W–L	Date	Tournament	Tier	Surface	Opponent	Score
Loss	0–1	Jan 2016	ITF Hammamet, Tunisia	W10	Clay	(Italy) Anastasia Grymalska	6–7^{(3)}, 1–6
Loss	0–2	Feb 2016	ITF Hammamet, Tunisia	W10	Clay	(Italy) Angelica Moratelli	6–7^{(3)}, 4–6
Win	1–2	Mar 2017	ITF Amiens, France	W15	Clay (i)	(Italy) Camilla Rosatello	6–3, 6–4
Win	2–2	Apr 2017	ITF Dijon, France	W15	Hard (i)	(Ukraine) Anastasia Zarycká	6–4, 0–6, 7–6^{(5)}
Loss	2–3	Apr 2017	ITF Hammamet, Tunisia	W15	Clay	(Hungary) Panna Udvardy	6–1, 4–6, 3–6
Loss	2–4	Oct 2017	ITF Cherbourg-en-Cotentin, France	W25	Hard (i)	(France) Myrtille Georges	4–6, 6–3, 5–7
Loss	2–5	Jan 2019	Open Andrézieux-Bouthéon, France	W60	Hard (i)	(Slovakia) Rebecca Šramková	2–6, 7–6^{(4)}, 2–6
Loss	2–6	Apr 2019	ITF Calvi, France	W25+H	Hard	(Russia) Anastasiya Komardina	3–6, 2–6
Win	3–6	Jan 2020	ITF Fort-de-France, Martinique	W15	Hard	(France) Marine Partaud	6–3, 6–4
Win	4–6	Nov 2022	ITF Saint-Étienne, France	W25	Hard (i)	(France) Émeline Dartron	6–4, 3–0 ret.
Loss	4–7	Jan 2023	Open Andrézieux-Bouthéon, France	W60	Hard (i)	(France) Océane Dodin	6–3, 2–6, 5–7
Loss	4–8	Feb 2024	ITF Monastir, Tunisia	W15	Hard	(Czech Republic) Tereza Valentová	2–6, 1–6
Loss	4–9	Feb 2024	ITF Mâcon, France	W50	Hard (i)	(France) Harmony Tan	2–6, 0–6
Win	5–9	May 2024	ITF Platja d'Aro, Spain	W35	Clay	(Germany) Caroline Werner	2–6, 6–4, 7–5

==== Doubles: 14 (4 titles, 10 runner-ups) ====
Legend W80 tournaments (0–1) W25 tournaments (1–4) W10/15 tournaments (3–5)	Finals by surface Hard (3–4) Clay (1–6)

Result	W–L	Date	Tournament	Tier	Surface	Partner	Opponents	Score
Loss	0–1	Jan 2014	ITF Petit-Bourg, France (Guadeloupe)	W10	Hard	(France) Manon Peral	(Chinese Taipei) Hsu Ching-wen (Canada) Wendy Zhang	5–7, 0–6
Win	1–1	Feb 2014	ITF Mâcon, France	W10	Hard (i)	(France) Kinnie Laisné	(Italy) Federica di Sarra (Italy) Camilla Rosatello	6–3, 2–6, [10–8]
Loss	1–2	Apr 2014	ITF Santa Margherita di Pula, Italy	W10	Clay	(France) Manon Peral	(Romania) Stefana Andrei (Romania) Andreea Mitu	6–7^{(5)}, 2–6
Loss	1–3	Jan 2015	ITF Antalya, Turkey	W10	Clay	(France) Alice Bacquié	(Germany) Anne Schäfer (Slovakia) Lenka Wienerová	4–6, 4–6
Loss	1–4	Apr 2015	ITF El Kantaoui, Tunisia	W10	Hard	(France) Carla Touly	(France) Alice Bacquié (France) Estelle Cascino	3–6, 6–4, [5–10]
Loss	1–5	Dec 2016	ITF Hammamet, Tunisia	W10	Clay	(France) Jade Suvrijn	(Serbia) Tamara Čurović (Bosnia and Herzegovina) Jelena Simić	w/o
Win	2–5	Dec 2017	ITF Hammamet, Tunisia	W15	Clay	(France) Mathilde Armitano	(Italy) Claudia Giovine (Italy) Giorgia Marchetti	6–2, 6–4
Loss	2–6	Feb 2018	ITF Curitiba, Brazil	W25	Clay	(France) Harmony Tan	(Chinese Taipei) Hsu Chieh-yu (Mexico) Marcela Zacarías	0–6, 3–6
Win	3–6	Jan 2020	ITF Fort-de-France, Martinique	W15	Hard	(France) Marine Partaud	(United States) Alexandra Riley (United States) Jamilah Snells	6–2, 7–6^{(3)}
Win	4–6	Feb 2020	ITF Mâcon, France	W25	Hard (i)	(France) Marine Partaud	(Romania) Miriam Bulgaru (France) Estelle Cascino	3–6, 7–6^{(3)}, [12–10]
Loss	4–7	Apr 2021	ITF Calvi, France	W25	Clay	(France) Léolia Jeanjean	(North Macedonia) Lina Gjorcheska (France) Amandine Hesse	5–7, 4–6
Loss	4–8	Sep 2021	ITF Saint-Palais-sur-Mer, France	W25	Clay	(France) Léolia Jeanjean	(Kazakhstan) Anna Danilina (Ukraine) Valeriya Strakhova	7–6^{(7)}, 2–6, [4–10]
Loss	4–9	Oct 2021	Internationaux de Poitiers, France	W80	Hard (i)	(France) Léolia Jeanjean	(Georgia (country)) Mariam Bolkvadze (United Kingdom) Samantha Murray Sharan	6–7^{(5)}, 0–6
Loss	4–10	Feb 2022	Porto Indoor, Portugal	W25	Hard (i)	(France) Léolia Jeanjean	(Greece) Valentini Grammatikopoulou (Netherlands) Quirine Lemoine	2–6, 3–6
