= 2024 Burg-Wächter Ladies Open =

Tennis tournament

- Date: 12–18 February 2024
- Edition: 11th
- Category: ITF Women's World Tennis Tour
- Prize money: $60,000
- Surface: Carpet / Indoor
- Location: Altenkirchen, Germany

Champions

Singles
- Julia Avdeeva

Doubles
- (Poland) Maja Chwalińska / (Czech Republic) Jesika Malečková
← 2023 ·	AK Ladies Open	· 2025 →

The 2024 Burg-Wächter Ladies Open (branded as the Burg-Wächter Ladies Open by Rewe Petz for sponsorship reasons) is a professional tennis tournament played on indoor carpet courts. It was the eleventh edition of the tournament which was part of the 2024 ITF Women's World Tennis Tour. It took place in Altenkirchen, Germany between 12 and 18 February 2024.

== Singles main-draw entrants ==
=== Seeds ===
Country	Player	Rank^{1}	Seed
FRA	Océane Dodin	72	1
DEN	Clara Tauson	80	2
ESP	Marina Bassols Ribera	105	3
UKR	Daria Snigur	135	4
GER	Ella Seidel	157	5
	Polina Kudermetova	162	6
SUI	Céline Naef	176	7
AUT	Sinja Kraus	188	8

- ^{1} Rankings are as of 5 February 2024.

=== Other entrants ===
The following players received wildcards into the singles main draw:

- (Germany) Carolina Kuhl
- (Germany) Nastasja Schunk
- (Germany) Julia Stusek
- (Belgium) Alison Van Uytvanck

The following player received entry using a special ranking:

- (Poland) Maja Chwalińska

The following player received entry using a special exempt:

- (Belgium) Magali Kempen

The following players received entry from the qualifying draw:

- (United Kingdom) Emily Appleton
- (Germany) Kathleen Kanev
- (Poland) Martyna Kubka
- (Croatia) Iva Primorac
- (Poland) Urszula Radwańska
- (United States) Anna Rogers
- (Germany) Stephanie Wagner
- (United States) Vivian Wolff

The following player received entry as a lucky loser:

- (Switzerland) Susan Bandecchi
- (Germany) Angelina Wirges

== Champions ==
=== Singles ===
- Julia Avdeeva def. (Belgium) Alison Van Uytvanck 6–4, 6–4.

=== Doubles ===
- (Poland) Maja Chwalińska / (Czech Republic) Jesika Malečková def. (Germany) Julia Lohoff / (Switzerland) Conny Perrin 6–4, 7–5.
