= 2022 Burg-Wächter Ladies Open =

Tennis tournament

- Date: 14–20 February 2022
- Edition: 9th
- Category: ITF Women's World Tennis Tour
- Prize money: $60,000
- Surface: Carpet / Indoor
- Location: Altenkirchen, Germany

Champions

Singles
- (Belgium) Greet Minnen

Doubles
- (Georgia (country)) Mariam Bolkvadze / (United Kingdom) Samantha Murray Sharan
← 2021 ·	AK Ladies Open	· 2023 →

The 2022 Burg-Wächter Ladies Open was a professional tennis tournament played on indoor carpet courts. It was the ninth edition of the tournament which was part of the 2022 ITF Women's World Tennis Tour. It took place in Altenkirchen, Germany between 14 and 20 February 2022.

== Singles main-draw entrants ==
=== Seeds ===
Country	Player	Rank^{1}	Seed
BEL	Greet Minnen	96	1
BUL	Viktoriya Tomova	109	2
GER	Jule Niemeier	118	3
GER	Anna-Lena Friedsam	131	4
UKR	Daria Snigur	140	5
ESP	Cristina Bucșa	143	6
ESP	Aliona Bolsova	150	7
~~GBR~~	~~Katie Boulter~~	~~153~~	~~8~~

- ^{1} Rankings are as of 7 February 2022.

=== Other entrants ===
The following players received wildcards into the singles main draw:

- (Russia) Ekaterina Kuznetsova
- (Germany) Eva Lys
- (Germany) Julia Middendorf
- (Germany) Nastasja Schunk

The following players received entry from the qualifying draw:

- (Russia) Erika Andreeva
- (Germany) Mona Barthel
- (Switzerland) Jenny Dürst
- (Germany) Noma Noha Akugue
- (Switzerland) Arlinda Rushiti
- (Germany) Ella Seidel

The following player received entry as a lucky loser:

- (Germany) Angelina Wirges

== Champions ==
=== Singles ===
- (Belgium) Greet Minnen def. (Ukraine) Daria Snigur, 6–4, 6–3

=== Doubles ===
- (Georgia (country)) Mariam Bolkvadze / (United Kingdom) Samantha Murray Sharan def. (Switzerland) Susan Bandecchi / (Switzerland) Simona Waltert, 6–3, 7–5
