= 2023 Burg-Wächter Ladies Open – Singles =

Singles
- 2023 Burg-Wächter Ladies Open

Final
- Champion: (Denmark) Clara Tauson
- Runner-up: (Belgium) Greet Minnen
- Score: 7–6^{(7–5)}, 4–6, 6–2

Events
Singles	Doubles
← 2022 ·	AK Ladies Open	· 2024 →

The 2023 Burg-Wächter Ladies Open – Singles was the singles event of a professional tennis tournament played on indoor hard courts. It was the tenth edition of the tournament, which was part of the 2023 ITF Women's World Tennis Tour. It took place in Altenkirchen, Germany, between 13 and 19 February 2023.

The event was won by Clara Tauson, who defeated the defending champion Greet Minnen in the final, 6–7^{(5–7)}, 6–4, 2–6.

== Seeds ==
1. (Slovenia) Tamara Zidanšek (second round)
2. (Germany) Eva Lys (first round)
3. (Slovakia) Viktória Hrunčáková (second round)
4. (Switzerland) Ylena In-Albon (quarterfinals)
5. (Denmark) Clara Tauson (champion)
6. (Ukraine) Daria Snigur (quarterfinals)
7. Polina Kudermetova (quarterfinals)
8. (United Kingdom) Yuriko Miyazaki (first round)

== Draw ==
Key

- Q = Qualifier
- WC = Wild card
- LL = Lucky loser
- Alt = Alternate
- ITF = ITF entry
- PR = Protected ranking
- SR = Special ranking
- SE = Special exempt
- JE = Junior exempt
- JR = Junior Accelerator Programme entrant
- CO = College Accelerator Programme entrant
- NG = Next Gen Accelerator Program entrant
- w/o = Walkover
- r = Retired
- d = Defaulted

=== Finals ===
Semifinals
(Romania) Jaqueline Cristian	3	6^{3}
5	(Denmark) Clara Tauson	6	7^{7}
(Belgium) Greet Minnen	6	6
(Germany) Noma Noha Akugue	2	3

Final
5	(Denmark) Clara Tauson	7^{7}	4	6
(Belgium) Greet Minnen	6^{5}	6	2

=== Top half ===
First round
1	(Slovenia) T Zidanšek	6^{6}	6	6
Q	(Poland) U Radwańska	7^{8}	4	0
(Romania) J Cristian	0	6	6
WC	(Germany) Jo Steur	6	1	1
(Belgium) Y Wickmayer	6	6
WC	E Kuznetsova	0	0
(Germany) M Barthel	6	4	6
8	(United Kingdom) Y Miyazaki	0	6	3
4	(Switzerland) Y In-Albon	6	7^{7}
(Serbia) N Stevanović	3	6^{4}
(Austria) S Kraus	3	2
(Romania) I Bara	6	6
(Belgium) M Kempen	6	6
Q	(Germany) K Kanev	3	3
Q	(United Kingdom) E Appleton	3	4
5	(Denmark) C Tauson	6	6

Second round
1	(Slovenia) T Zidanšek	7	3	3
(Romania) J Cristian	5	6	6
(Belgium) Y Wickmayer	6	7
(Germany) M Barthel	3	5
4	(Switzerland) Y In-Albon	6	7
(Romania) I Bara	4	5
(Belgium) M Kempen	5	6	3
5	(Denmark) C Tauson	7	2	6

Quarterfinals
(Romania) J Cristian	6	3	6
(Belgium) Y Wickmayer	3	6	3
4	(Switzerland) Y In-Albon	1	0
5	(Denmark) C Tauson	6	6

Semifinals
(Romania) J Cristian	3	6^{3}
5	(Denmark) C Tauson	6	7^{7}

=== Bottom half ===
First round
7	P Kudermetova	1	6	6
Q	(Germany) C Kuhl	6	4	3
Q	(Estonia) M Nuudi	2	4
(Georgia (country)) E Gorgodze	6	6
(Belgium) G Minnen	7	6
Q	(Turkey) Z Sönmez	5	1
SR	(Switzerland) S Bandecchi	5	4
3	(Slovakia) V Hrunčáková	7	6
6	(Ukraine) D Snigur	6	6
(Czech Republic) B Palicová	3	1
WC	(Germany) M Guth	4	3
WC	(Germany) E Seidel	6	6
Q	(Germany) Y Morderger	4	4
Q	(Serbia) L Radivojević	6	6
(Germany) N Noha Akugue	6	6
2	(Germany) E Lys	1	1

Second round
7	P Kudermetova	6	6
(Georgia (country)) E Gorgodze	4	3
(Belgium) G Minnen	7^{7}	6
3	(Slovakia) V Hrunčáková	6^{3}	2
6	(Ukraine) D Snigur	6	6
WC	(Germany) E Seidel	3	2
Q	(Serbia) L Radivojević	2	3
(Germany) N Noha Akugue	6	6

Quarterfinals
7	P Kudermetova	6^{5}	4
(Belgium) G Minnen	7^{7}	6
6	(Ukraine) D Snigur	1	4
(Germany) N Noha Akugue	6	6

Semifinals
(Belgium) G Minnen	6	6
(Germany) N Noha Akugue	2	3
