= 2023 Burg-Wächter Ladies Open =

Tennis tournament

- Date: 13–19 February 2023
- Edition: 10th
- Category: ITF Women's World Tennis Tour
- Prize money: $60,000
- Surface: Hard / Indoor
- Location: Altenkirchen, Germany

Champions

Singles
- (Denmark) Clara Tauson

Doubles
- (Belgium) Greet Minnen / (Belgium) Yanina Wickmayer
← 2022 ·	AK Ladies Open	· 2024 →

The 2023 Burg-Wächter Ladies Open was a professional tennis tournament played on indoor hard courts. It was the tenth edition of the tournament, which was part of the 2023 ITF Women's World Tennis Tour. It took place in Altenkirchen, Germany, between 13 and 19 February 2023.

== Champions ==
=== Singles ===
- (Denmark) Clara Tauson def. (Belgium) Greet Minnen, 7–6^{(7–5)}, 4–6, 6–2

=== Doubles ===
- (Belgium) Greet Minnen / (Belgium) Yanina Wickmayer def. (United Kingdom) Freya Christie / (United Kingdom) Ali Collins, 6–1, 6–3

== Singles main draw entrants ==
=== Seeds ===
Country	Player	Rank	Seed
SLO	Tamara Zidanšek	117	1
GER	Eva Lys	126	2
SVK	Viktória Hrunčáková	127	3
SUI	Ylena In-Albon	134	4
DEN	Clara Tauson	141	5
UKR	Daria Snigur	144	6
	Polina Kudermetova	171	7
GBR	Yuriko Miyazaki	172	8

- Rankings are as of 6 February 2023.

=== Other entrants ===
The following players received wildcards into the singles main draw:

- (Germany) Mara Guth
- Ekaterina Kuznetsova
- (Germany) Ella Seidel
- (Germany) Joëlle Steur

The following player received entry into the singles main draw using a special ranking:

- (Switzerland) Susan Bandecchi

The following player received entry into the singles main draw as a special exempt:

- (Belgium) Greet Minnen

The following players received entry from the qualifying draw:

- (United Kingdom) Emily Appleton
- (Germany) Kathleen Kanev
- (Germany) Carolina Kuhl
- (Germany) Yana Morderger
- (Estonia) Maileen Nuudi
- (Serbia) Lola Radivojević
- (Poland) Urszula Radwańska
- (Turkey) Zeynep Sönmez
