= 2024 Burg-Wächter Ladies Open – Doubles =

Doubles
- 2024 Burg-Wächter Ladies Open

Final
- Champions: (Poland) Maja Chwalińska (Czech Republic) Jesika Malečková
- Runners-up: (Germany) Julia Lohoff (Switzerland) Conny Perrin
- Score: 6–4, 7–5

Events
Singles	Doubles
← 2023 ·	AK Ladies Open	· 2025 →

Greet Minnen and Yanina Wickmayer were the defending champions but chose not to participate.

Maja Chwalińska and Jesika Malečková won the title, defeating Julia Lohoff and Conny Perrin in the final, 6–4, 7–5.

== Seeds ==
1. (Germany) Julia Lohoff / (Switzerland) Conny Perrin (final)
2. (United Kingdom) Emily Appleton / (Poland) Martyna Kubka (semifinals)
3. (Netherlands) Isabelle Haverlag / (United States) Anna Rogers (first round)
4. (Uzbekistan) Nigina Abduraimova / Alena Fomina-Klotz (first round)

== Draw ==
Key

- Q = Qualifier
- WC = Wild card
- LL = Lucky loser
- Alt = Alternate
- ITF = ITF entry
- PR = Protected ranking
- SR = Special ranking
- SE = Special exempt
- JE = Junior exempt
- JR = Junior Accelerator Programme entrant
- CO = College Accelerator Programme entrant
- NG = Next Gen Accelerator Program entrant
- w/o = Walkover
- r = Retired
- d = Defaulted

First round
1	(Germany) J Lohoff (Switzerland) C Perrin	7	6
(Germany) C Kuhl (Germany) M Vogt	5	2
(Switzerland) S Bandecchi (Spain) M Bassols Ribera	6	2	[10]
(Austria) M Klaffner (Austria) S Kraus	0	6	[4]
3	(Netherlands) I Haverlag (United States) A Rogers	6	4	[10]
(Germany) K Kanev (France) A Robbe	1	6	[12]
(Italy) S Ambrosio (Germany) L Papadakis	7^{8}	6
(Germany) N Schunk (Germany) E Seidel	6^{6}	4
(Chinese Taipei) Y-h Lee (Bosnia and Herzegovina) A Wagner	6	6
WC	(Germany) C Bednarczyk (Germany) A Wirges	2	2
(Poland) M Chwalińska (Czech Republic) J Malečková	4	6	[10]
4	(Uzbekistan) N Abduraimova; A Fomina-Klotz	6	2	[7]
(Germany) T Morderger (Germany) Y Morderger	2	0
(Switzerland) C Naef (Netherlands) B Schoofs	6	6
J Avdeeva; F Gettwart	4	5
2	(United Kingdom) E Appleton (Poland) M Kubka	6	7

Quarterfinals
1	(Germany) J Lohoff (Switzerland) C Perrin	6	6
(Switzerland) S Bandecchi (Spain) M Bassols Ribera	3	3
(Germany) K Kanev (France) A Robbe	1	2
(Italy) S Ambrosio (Germany) L Papadakis	6	6
(Chinese Taipei) Y-h Lee (Bosnia and Herzegovina) A Wagner	4	7	[2]
(Poland) M Chwalińska (Czech Republic) J Malečková	6	5	[10]
(Switzerland) C Naef (Netherlands) B Schoofs	3	4
2	(United Kingdom) E Appleton (Poland) M Kubka	6	6

Semifinals
1	(Germany) J Lohoff (Switzerland) C Perrin	3	6	[10]
(Italy) S Ambrosio (Germany) L Papadakis	6	3	[6]
(Poland) M Chwalińska (Czech Republic) J Malečková	6	6
2	(United Kingdom) E Appleton (Poland) M Kubka	3	3

Final
1	(Germany) J Lohoff (Switzerland) C Perrin	4	5
(Poland) M Chwalińska (Czech Republic) J Malečková	6	7
