= 2024 Burg-Wächter Ladies Open – Singles =

Singles
- 2024 Burg-Wächter Ladies Open

Final
- Champion: Julia Avdeeva
- Runner-up: (Belgium) Alison Van Uytvanck
- Score: 6–4, 6–4

Events
| Singles | Doubles |
- AK Ladies Open

Clara Tauson was the defending champion, but lost in the first round to Alison Van Uytvanck.

Julia Avdeeva won the title, defeating Van Uytvanck in the final, 6–4, 6–4.

== Seeds ==
1. (France) Océane Dodin (semifinals)
2. (Denmark) Clara Tauson (first round)
3. (Spain) Marina Bassols Ribera (quarterfinals)
4. (Ukraine) Daria Snigur (second round)
5. (Germany) Ella Seidel (second round)
6. Polina Kudermetova (first round)
7. (Switzerland) Céline Naef (second round)
8. (Austria) Sinja Kraus (quarterfinals)

== Draw ==
Key

- Q = Qualifier
- WC = Wild card
- LL = Lucky loser
- Alt = Alternate
- ITF = ITF entry
- PR = Protected ranking
- SR = Special ranking
- SE = Special exempt
- JE = Junior exempt
- JR = Junior Accelerator Programme entrant
- CO = College Accelerator Programme entrant
- NG = Next Gen Accelerator Program entrant
- w/o = Walkover
- r = Retired
- d = Defaulted

=== Finals ===
Semifinals
1 | (France) Océane Dodin | 6 | 3 | 4
Julia Avdeeva | 1 | 6 | 6
WC | (Germany) Nastasja Schunk | 4 | 7 | 3
WC | (Belgium) Alison Van Uytvanck | 6 | 5 | 6

Final
Julia Avdeeva | 6 | 6
WC | (Belgium) Alison Van Uytvanck | 4 | 4

=== Top half ===
First round
1 | (France) O Dodin | 6 | 7^{7}
WC | (Germany) J Stusek | 3 | 6^{5}
Q | (Germany) K Kanev | 6 | 7^{7}
LL | (Switzerland) S Bandecchi | 1 | 6^{3}
SE | (Belgium) M Kempen | 4 | 6 | 6
(Germany) N Noha Akugue | 6 | 0 | 3
(Uzbekistan) N Abduraimova | 4 | 4
5 | (Germany) E Seidel | 6 | 6
3 | (Spain) M Bassols Ribera | 7 | 7^{7}
Q | (Croatia) I Primorac | 5 | 6^{5}
(Germany) M Barthel | 1 | 7^{7} | 6
WC | (Germany) C Kuhl | 6 | 6^{2} | 0
Q | (Germany) S Wagner | 6 | 6^{4} | 2
(Turkey) B Cengiz | 4 | 7^{7} | 6
J Avdeeva | 6 | 6
6 | P Kudermetova | 4 | 4

Second round
1 | (France) O Dodin | 6 | 6
Q | (Germany) K Kanev | 4 | 1
SE | (Belgium) M Kempen | 4 | 6 | 7
5 | (Germany) E Seidel | 6 | 3 | 5
3 | (Spain) M Bassols Ribera | 6 | 6
(Germany) M Barthel | 4 | 2
(Turkey) B Cengiz | 7^{10} | 4 | 3
J Avdeeva | 6^{8} | 6 | 6

Quarterfinals
1 | (France) O Dodin | 0 | 6 | 6
SE | (Belgium) M Kempen | 6 | 3 | 2
3 | (Spain) M Bassols Ribera | 1 | 4
J Avdeeva | 6 | 6

Semifinals
1 | (France) O Dodin | 6 | 3 | 4
J Avdeeva | 1 | 6 | 6

=== Bottom half ===
First round
8 | (Austria) S Kraus | 4 | 7 | 6
Q | (Poland) U Radwańska | 6 | 5 | 2
SR | (Poland) M Chwalińska | 6 | 6
LL | (Germany) A Wirges | 3 | 0
Q | (United Kingdom) E Appleton | 4 | 2
WC | (Germany) N Schunk | 6 | 6
(France) A Robbe | 1 | 2
4 | (Ukraine) D Snigur | 6 | 6
7 | (Switzerland) C Naef | 7^{7} | 6
Q | (United States) A Rogers | 6^{3} | 1
(Italy) S Ambrosio | 6^{3} | 0
(Liechtenstein) K von Deichmann | 7^{7} | 6
Q | (Poland) M Kubka | 4 | 6 | 4
Q | (United States) V Wolff | 6 | 4 | 6
WC | (Belgium) A Van Uytvanck | 6 | 5 | 7^{7}
2 | (Denmark) C Tauson | 1 | 7 | 6^{1}

Second round
8 | (Austria) S Kraus | 7^{7} | 4 | 6
SR | (Poland) M Chwalińska | 6^{4} | 6 | 3
WC | (Germany) N Schunk | 6 | 6
4 | (Ukraine) D Snigur | 2 | 4
7 | (Switzerland) C Naef | 3 | 6 | 4
(Liechtenstein) K von Deichmann | 6 | 4 | 6
Q | (United States) V Wolff | 6 | 4 | 0
WC | (Belgium) A Van Uytvanck | 2 | 6 | 6

Quarterfinals
8 | (Austria) S Kraus | 1 | 2
WC | (Germany) N Schunk | 6 | 6
(Liechtenstein) K von Deichmann | 1 | 5
WC | (Belgium) A Van Uytvanck | 6 | 7

Semifinals
WC | (Germany) N Schunk | 4 | 7 | 3
WC | (Belgium) A Van Uytvanck | 6 | 5 | 6
