= 2022 Burg-Wächter Ladies Open – Doubles =

Doubles
- 2022 Burg-Wächter Ladies Open

Final
- Champions: (Georgia (country)) Mariam Bolkvadze (United Kingdom) Samantha Murray Sharan
- Runners-up: (Switzerland) Susan Bandecchi (Switzerland) Simona Waltert
- Score: 6–3, 7–5

Events
Singles	Doubles
← 2021 ·	AK Ladies Open	· 2023 →

Paula Kania-Choduń and Julia Lohoff were the defending champions but chose not to participate.

Mariam Bolkvadze and Samantha Murray Sharan won the title, defeating Susan Bandecchi and Simona Waltert in the final, 6–3, 7–5.

== Seeds ==
1. (Russia) Anna Blinkova / (Spain) Aliona Bolsova (quarterfinals, withdrew)
2. (Belgium) Greet Minnen / (Romania) Andreea Mitu (first round)
3. (United Kingdom) Alicia Barnett / (United Kingdom) Olivia Nicholls (first round)
4. (Georgia (country)) Mariam Bolkvadze / (United Kingdom) Samantha Murray Sharan (champions)

== Draw ==
Key

- Q = Qualifier
- WC = Wild card
- LL = Lucky loser
- Alt = Alternate
- ITF = ITF entry
- PR = Protected ranking
- SR = Special ranking
- SE = Special exempt
- JE = Junior exempt
- JR = Junior Accelerator Programme entrant
- CO = College Accelerator Programme entrant
- NG = Next Gen Accelerator Program entrant
- w/o = Walkover
- r = Retired
- d = Defaulted

=== Draw ===
First round
1	(Russia) A Blinkova (Spain) A Bolsova	6	6
WC	(Germany) C Kuhl (Germany) E Seidel	0	2
(Germany) J Middendorf (Germany) N Schunk	6	6
WC	(Germany) S Dal (Russia) E Kuznetsova	1	1
3	(United Kingdom) A Barnett (United Kingdom) O Nicholls	4	6	[8]
(Switzerland) S Bandecchi (Switzerland) S Waltert	6	3	[10]
(Spain) G García Pérez (Switzerland) X Knoll	6	2	[6]
(Belgium) Y Bonaventure (France) E Cascino	3	6	[10]
(Netherlands) S Lamens (Japan) Y Miyazaki	6	6
(Netherlands) N Liauw a Fong (Netherlands) G Mujan	1	1
(Russia) E Andreeva (Latvia) D Vismane	0	2
4	(Georgia (country)) M Bolkvadze (United Kingdom) S Murray Sharan	6	6
WC	(Germany) N Noha Akugue (Germany) A Wirges	6	6
(Germany) T Morderger (Germany) Y Morderger	2	1
(Spain) C Bucșa (Czech Republic) A Dețiuc	6	1	[10]
2	(Belgium) G Minnen (Romania) A Mitu	4	6	[3]

Quarterfinals
1	(Russia) A Blinkova (Spain) A Bolsova
(Germany) J Middendorf (Germany) N Schunk	w/o
(Switzerland) S Bandecchi (Switzerland) S Waltert	6	3	[11]
(Belgium) Y Bonaventure (France) E Cascino	2	6	[9]
(Netherlands) S Lamens (Japan) Y Miyazaki	6^{5}	3
4	(Georgia (country)) M Bolkvadze (United Kingdom) S Murray Sharan	7^{7}	6
WC	(Germany) N Noha Akugue (Germany) A Wirges	6	4	[4]
(Spain) C Bucșa (Czech Republic) A Dețiuc	1	6	[10]

Semifinals
(Germany) J Middendorf (Germany) N Schunk	5	6	[5]
(Switzerland) S Bandecchi (Switzerland) S Waltert	7	2	[10]
4	(Georgia (country)) M Bolkvadze (United Kingdom) S Murray Sharan	6	6
(Spain) C Bucșa (Czech Republic) A Dețiuc	1	1

Final
(Switzerland) S Bandecchi (Switzerland) S Waltert	3	5
4	(Georgia (country)) M Bolkvadze (United Kingdom) S Murray Sharan	6	7
