= 2022 Burg-Wächter Ladies Open – Singles =

Singles
- 2022 Burg-Wächter Ladies Open

Final
- Champion: (Belgium) Greet Minnen
- Runner-up: (Ukraine) Daria Snigur
- Score: 6–4, 6–3

Events
Singles	Doubles
← 2021 ·	AK Ladies Open	· 2023 →

Greet Minnen won the title, defeating Daria Snigur in the final, 6–4, 6–3.

Clara Tauson was the defending champion, but chose to compete in the qualifying competition at the Dubai Tennis Championships.

== Seeds ==
1. (Belgium) Greet Minnen (champion)
2. (Bulgaria) Viktoriya Tomova (first round)
3. (Germany) Jule Niemeier (first round)
4. (Germany) Anna-Lena Friedsam (first round)
5. (Ukraine) Daria Snigur (final)
6. (Spain) Cristina Bucșa (quarterfinals)
7. (Spain) Aliona Bolsova (first round)
8. (United Kingdom) Katie Boulter (withdrew)

== Draw ==
Key

- Q = Qualifier
- WC = Wild card
- LL = Lucky loser
- Alt = Alternate
- ITF = ITF entry
- PR = Protected ranking
- SR = Special ranking
- SE = Special exempt
- JE = Junior exempt
- JR = Junior Accelerator Programme entrant
- CO = College Accelerator Programme entrant
- NG = Next Gen Accelerator Program entrant
- w/o = Walkover
- r = Retired
- d = Defaulted

=== Finals ===
Semifinals
1	(Belgium) Greet Minnen	6	4	6
(Georgia (country)) Mariam Bolkvadze	1	6	1
Q	(Russia) Erika Andreeva	2	3
5	(Ukraine) Daria Snigur	6	6

Final
1	(Belgium) Greet Minnen	6	6
5	(Ukraine) Daria Snigur	4	3

=== Top half ===
First round
1	(Belgium) G Minnen	6	6
WC	(Russia) E Kuznetsova	0	1
(Switzerland) Y In-Albon	3	3
Q	(Germany) E Seidel	6	6
WC	(Germany) E Lys	6	6
WC	(Germany) J Middendorf	4	1
(Latvia) D Vismane	4	6^{2}
6	(Spain) C Bucșa	6	7^{7}
3	(Germany) J Niemeier	2	6^{3}
(Poland) U Radwańska	6	7^{7}
Q	(Switzerland) J Dürst	3	3
WC	(Germany) N Schunk	6	6
(Spain) G García Pérez	6^{4}	7^{7}	7^{8}
(Switzerland) S Waltert	7^{7}	6^{4}	6^{6}
(Georgia (country)) M Bolkvadze	6	6
LL	(Germany) A Wirges	4	2

Second round
1	(Belgium) G Minnen	4	6	6
Q	(Germany) E Seidel	6	1	0
WC	(Germany) E Lys	6^{1}	1
6	(Spain) C Bucșa	7^{7}	6
(Poland) U Radwańska	5	5
WC	(Germany) N Schunk	7	7
(Spain) G García Pérez	2	6	3
(Georgia (country)) M Bolkvadze	6	4	6

Quarterfinals
1	(Belgium) G Minnen	6	4	6
6	(Spain) C Bucșa	2	6	1
WC	(Germany) N Schunk	6	4	4
(Georgia (country)) M Bolkvadze	3	6	6

Semifinals
1	(Belgium) G Minnen	6	4	6
(Georgia (country)) M Bolkvadze	1	6	1

=== Bottom half ===
First round
7	(Spain) A Bolsova	0	2
(Liechtenstein) K von Deichmann	6	6
(Russia) A Blinkova	6	6
(Belgium) Y Bonaventure	3	1
Q	(Germany) N Noha Akugue	4	2
(Japan) Y Miyazaki	6	6
Q	(Russia) E Andreeva	7^{8}	6
4	(Germany) A-L Friedsam	6^{6}	3
5	(Ukraine) D Snigur	6	6
Q	(Switzerland) A Rushiti	1	3
Q	(Germany) M Barthel	4	4
(Switzerland) S Bandecchi	6	6
(Germany) S Wagner	6	6
(Netherlands) S Lamens	3	0
(Switzerland) J Züger	6	4	6
2	(Bulgaria) V Tomova	3	6	4

Second round
(Liechtenstein) K von Deichmann	5	6	6
(Russia) A Blinkova	7	4	3
(Japan) Y Miyazaki	0	2
Q	(Russia) E Andreeva	6	6
5	(Ukraine) D Snigur	6	6
(Switzerland) S Bandecchi	1	2
(Germany) S Wagner	4	4
(Switzerland) J Züger	6	6

Quarterfinals
(Liechtenstein) K von Deichmann	3	6	2
Q	(Russia) E Andreeva	6	4	6
5	(Ukraine) D Snigur	6	7
(Switzerland) J Züger	4	5

Semifinals
Q	(Russia) E Andreeva	2	3
5	(Ukraine) D Snigur	6	6
