= 2022 French Open – Women's singles qualifying =

Women's singles qualifying
- 2022 French Open

Events
Singles	men	women		boys	girls
Doubles	men	women	mixed	boys	girls
WC Singles	men	women	quad
WC Doubles	men	women	quad
Legends	men	women

Qualification
Singles	men	women
← 2021 ·	French Open	· 2023 →

The 2022 French Open – Women's singles qualifying are a series of tennis matches that takes place from 16 to 20 May 2022 to determine the sixteen qualifiers into the main draw of the 2022 French Open – Women's singles, and, if necessary, the lucky losers.

== Seeds ==
1. Anastasia Potapova (second round)
2. (Germany) Jule Niemeier (qualified)
3. (China) Zhu Lin (qualified)
4. (China) Wang Xiyu (second round)
5. (Romania) Irina Bara (qualified)
6. (Croatia) Donna Vekić (qualified)
7. (Germany) Tamara Korpatsch (second round)
8. (Georgia (country)) Ekaterine Gorgodze (second round)
9. (Canada) Rebecca Marino (qualified)
10. (Bulgaria) Viktoriya Tomova (qualifying competition, lucky loser)
11. Anna Blinkova (first round)
12. Vitalia Diatchenko (first round)
13. (Serbia) Aleksandra Krunić (qualified)
14. (Ukraine) Lesia Tsurenko (qualified)
15. (Romania) Mihaela Buzărnescu (qualifying competition, lucky loser)
16. (Brazil) Laura Pigossi (first round)
17. (United States) Hailey Baptiste (qualified)
18. (Australia) Maddison Inglis (first round)
19. (Japan) Mai Hontama (first round)
20. (Hungary) Réka Luca Jani (qualifying competition, lucky loser)
21. (Spain) Cristina Bucșa (qualified)
22. (United States) CoCo Vandeweghe (first round)
23. (Spain) Rebeka Masarova (first round)
24. (Kazakhstan) Zarina Diyas (first round)
25. (Poland) Katarzyna Kawa (first round)
26. (Switzerland) Ylena In-Albon (first round)
27. (Netherlands) Lesley Pattinama Kerkhove (first round)
28. (China) Yuan Yue (first round)
29. (Ukraine) Kateryna Baindl (first round)
30. (Ukraine) Daria Snigur (first round)
31. (Sweden) Mirjam Björklund (qualified)
32. Elina Avanesyan (first round)

== Qualifiers ==
1. (Belgium) Ysaline Bonaventure
2. (Germany) Jule Niemeier
3. (China) Zhu Lin
4. (Spain) Cristina Bucșa
5. (Romania) Irina Bara
6. (Croatia) Donna Vekić
7. (Mexico) Fernanda Contreras Gómez
8. Oksana Selekhmeteva
9. (Canada) Rebecca Marino
10. (Serbia) Olga Danilović
11. (Czech Republic) Linda Nosková
12. (Greece) Valentini Grammatikopoulou
13. (Serbia) Aleksandra Krunić
14. (Ukraine) Lesia Tsurenko
15. (Sweden) Mirjam Björklund
16. (United States) Hailey Baptiste

== Lucky losers ==
1. (Bulgaria) Viktoriya Tomova
2. (Romania) Mihaela Buzărnescu
3. (Hungary) Réka Luca Jani
4. (Germany) Nastasja Schunk
5. Anastasia Gasanova
6. (Slovakia) Rebecca Šramková

== Draw ==
=== First qualifier ===
First round
1	Anastasia Potapova	6	6
(Mexico) Renata Zarazúa	2	3
(Cyprus) Raluca Șerban	5	6	2
(Finland) Anastasia Kulikova	7	3	6
(Greece) Despina Papamichail	1	6	6^{4}
(Belgium) Ysaline Bonaventure	6	3	7^{10}
(United Kingdom) Yuriko Miyazaki	6	6
26	(Switzerland) Ylena In-Albon	3	3

Second round
1	Anastasia Potapova	7	6^{5}	3
(Finland) Anastasia Kulikova	5	7^{7}	6
(Belgium) Ysaline Bonaventure	7	6
(United Kingdom) Yuriko Miyazaki	5	2

Qualifying competition
(Finland) Anastasia Kulikova	4	2
(Belgium) Ysaline Bonaventure	6	6

=== Second qualifier ===
First round
2	(Germany) Jule Niemeier	6	6
(Romania) Alexandra Cadanțu-Ignatik	1	1
(Bosnia and Herzegovina) Dea Herdželaš	3	6^{0}
(France) Jessika Ponchet	6	7^{7}
(Spain) Aliona Bolsova	4	4
(Liechtenstein) Kathinka von Deichmann	6	6
(Japan) Moyuka Uchijima	6	6
28	(China) Yuan Yue	2	3

Second round
2	(Germany) Jule Niemeier	6	6
(France) Jessika Ponchet	4	0
(Liechtenstein) Kathinka von Deichmann	6	4	2
(Japan) Moyuka Uchijima	3	6	6

Qualifying competition
2	(Germany) Jule Niemeier	6	6
(Japan) Moyuka Uchijima	0	1

=== Third qualifier ===
First round
3	(China) Zhu Lin	6	6
(Australia) Storm Sanders	4	4
Natalia Vikhlyantseva	6	7^{7}
PR	(Spain) Georgina García Pérez	3	6^{4}
(United States) Jamie Loeb	6^{5}	4
(Slovakia) Viktória Kužmová	7^{7}	6
(Czech Republic) Linda Fruhvirtová	6	6
25	(Poland) Katarzyna Kawa	0	4

Second round
3	(China) Zhu Lin	6	6
Natalia Vikhlyantseva	1	2
(Slovakia) Viktória Kužmová	7	3	7
(Czech Republic) Linda Fruhvirtová	5	6	5

Qualifying competition
3	(China) Zhu Lin	7	6
(Slovakia) Viktória Kužmová	5	3

=== Fourth qualifier ===
First round
4	(China) Wang Xiyu	7	6
(South Korea) Han Na-lae	5	0
(Germany) Laura Siegemund	6	6
Anastasia Zakharova	3	0
(Australia) Arina Rodionova	6	6
(United States) Emina Bektas	2	4
Olga Govortsova	1	3
21	(Spain) Cristina Bucșa	6	6

Second round
4	(China) Wang Xiyu	3	3
(Germany) Laura Siegemund	6	6
(Australia) Arina Rodionova	3	3
21	(Spain) Cristina Bucșa	6	6

Qualifying competition
(Germany) Laura Siegemund	6	3	1
21	(Spain) Cristina Bucșa	4	6	6

=== Fifth qualifier ===
First round
5	(Romania) Irina Bara	6	4	6
(Czech Republic) Jesika Malečková	3	6	3
WC	(France) Estelle Cascino	4	3
WC	(France) Séléna Janicijevic	6	6
(United States) Sachia Vickery	2	2
(Japan) Nao Hibino	6	6
Yuliya Hatouka	6	5	6
19	(Japan) Mai Hontama	4	7	4

Second round
5	(Romania) Irina Bara	5	6	6
WC	(France) Séléna Janicijevic	7	4	3
(Japan) Nao Hibino	7^{9}	6
Yuliya Hatouka	6^{7}	2

Qualifying competition
5	(Romania) Irina Bara	7^{7}	6
(Japan) Nao Hibino	6^{5}	4

=== Sixth qualifier ===
First round
6	(Croatia) Donna Vekić	6	6
(United States) Robin Anderson	4	4
(Croatia) Jana Fett	5	3
(United States) Louisa Chirico	7	6
(United States) Francesca Di Lorenzo	4	4
PR	(Australia) Priscilla Hon	6	6
Anastasia Gasanova	6	6
24	(Kazakhstan) Zarina Diyas	3	4

Second round
6	(Croatia) Donna Vekić	6	3	7
(United States) Louisa Chirico	0	6	5
PR	(Australia) Priscilla Hon	4	3
Anastasia Gasanova	6	6

Qualifying competition
6	(Croatia) Donna Vekić	4	6	6
Anastasia Gasanova	6	2	2

=== Seventh qualifier ===
First round
7	(Germany) Tamara Korpatsch	6	6
WC	(France) Lucie Nguyen Tan	0	0
(Switzerland) Joanne Züger	7	6
(United States) Asia Muhammad	5	3
(Mexico) Fernanda Contreras Gómez	3	6	7^{10}
(United States) Caty McNally	6	3	6^{8}
(Turkey) İpek Öz	6^{6}	6	6
30	(Ukraine) Daria Snigur	7^{8}	3	2

Second round
7	(Germany) Tamara Korpatsch	2	6	4
(Switzerland) Joanne Züger	6	4	6
(Mexico) Fernanda Contreras Gómez	5	6	6
(Turkey) İpek Öz	7	4	2

Qualifying competition
(Switzerland) Joanne Züger	1	6	3
(Mexico) Fernanda Contreras Gómez	6	3	6

=== Eighth qualifier ===
First round
8	(Georgia (country)) Ekaterine Gorgodze	6	6
WC	(France) Loïs Boisson	2	2
WC	(France) Océane Babel	3	6	6
WC	(France) Alice Ramé	6	4	4
(Italy) Elisabetta Cocciaretto	6	6
(Netherlands) Arianne Hartono	2	4
Oksana Selekhmeteva	6	3	6
29	(Ukraine) Kateryna Baindl	1	6	3

Second round
8	(Georgia (country)) Ekaterine Gorgodze	6	4	4
WC	(France) Océane Babel	1	6	6
(Italy) Elisabetta Cocciaretto	3	3
Oksana Selekhmeteva	6	6

Qualifying competition
WC	(France) Océane Babel	1	4
Oksana Selekhmeteva	6	6

=== Ninth qualifier ===
First round
9	(Canada) Rebecca Marino	6	6
(Argentina) Paula Ormaechea	4	3
(Italy) Lucrezia Stefanini	3	7	5
(Ukraine) Katarina Zavatska	6	5	7
(Georgia (country)) Mariam Bolkvadze	6	4	2
(Australia) Seone Mendez	3	6	6
(United States) Caroline Dolehide	7^{7}	4	7
32	Elina Avanesyan	6^{2}	6	5

Second round
9	(Canada) Rebecca Marino	6	6
(Ukraine) Katarina Zavatska	1	2
(Australia) Seone Mendez	7^{9}	7
(United States) Caroline Dolehide	6^{7}	5

Qualifying competition
9	(Canada) Rebecca Marino	6	6
(Australia) Seone Mendez	2	0

=== Tenth qualifier ===
First round
10	(Bulgaria) Viktoriya Tomova	6	6
(United Kingdom) Katie Swan	3	2
PR	Varvara Flink	4	4
Marina Melnikova	6	6
(Switzerland) Simona Waltert	6^{4}	6	6
(United States) Hanna Chang	7^{7}	1	4
(Serbia) Olga Danilović	3	7^{9}	6
23	(Spain) Rebeka Masarova	6	6^{7}	4

Second round
10	(Bulgaria) Viktoriya Tomova	2	7	6
Marina Melnikova	6	5	0
(Switzerland) Simona Waltert	6	6^{3}	3
(Serbia) Olga Danilović	4	7^{7}	6

Qualifying competition
10	(Bulgaria) Viktoriya Tomova	2	6	6^{3}
(Serbia) Olga Danilović	6	1	7^{10}

=== Eleventh qualifier ===
First round
11	Anna Blinkova	3	5
(Czech Republic) Linda Nosková	6	7
PR	Anastasiya Komardina	6	3	4
(Switzerland) Conny Perrin	4	6	6
(Slovakia) Rebecca Šramková	6^{9}	6	6
(United States) Alycia Parks	7^{11}	4	4
(Netherlands) Suzan Lamens	6	6
18	(Australia) Maddison Inglis	2	2

Second round
(Czech Republic) Linda Nosková	6	4	6
(Switzerland) Conny Perrin	4	6	3
(Slovakia) Rebecca Šramková	4	7	6
(Netherlands) Suzan Lamens	6	5	2

Qualifying competition
(Czech Republic) Linda Nosková	6	6
(Slovakia) Rebecca Šramková	3	2

=== Twelfth qualifier ===
First round
12	Vitalia Diatchenko	5	3
(Bulgaria) Isabella Shinikova	7	6
(Greece) Valentini Grammatikopoulou	6	6
Valeria Savinykh	4	1
(Brazil) Carolina Alves	6	7
(Andorra) Victoria Jiménez Kasintseva	3	5
(United States) Christina McHale	6	6
27	(Netherlands) Lesley Pattinama Kerkhove	3	2

Second round
(Bulgaria) Isabella Shinikova	6	0	3
(Greece) Valentini Grammatikopoulou	2	6	6
(Brazil) Carolina Alves	6^{4}	2
(United States) Christina McHale	7^{7}	6

Qualifying competition
(Greece) Valentini Grammatikopoulou	6	6
(United States) Christina McHale	3	3

=== Thirteenth qualifier ===
First round
13	(Serbia) Aleksandra Krunić	6^{4}	6	6
(Romania) Gabriela Lee	7^{7}	3	1
WC	(France) Salma Djoubri	6	1	1
(United States) Grace Min	3	6	6
(Italy) Federica Di Sarra	6^{7}	3
(Australia) Jaimee Fourlis	7^{9}	6
WC	(France) Audrey Albié	4	2
20	(Hungary) Réka Luca Jani	6	6

Second round
13	(Serbia) Aleksandra Krunić	3	7	7
(United States) Grace Min	6	5	5
(Australia) Jaimee Fourlis	7^{7}	5	3
20	(Hungary) Réka Luca Jani	6^{3}	7	6

Qualifying competition
13	(Serbia) Aleksandra Krunić	7	6
20	(Hungary) Réka Luca Jani	5	2

=== Fourteenth qualifier ===
First round
14	(Ukraine) Lesia Tsurenko	6	6
PR	(Colombia) Emiliana Arango	0	1
(South Korea) Jang Su-jeong	1	2
(Italy) Sara Errani	6	6
(Japan) Yuki Naito	6	6
(Netherlands) Richèl Hogenkamp	4	2
(Germany) Katharina Gerlach	7^{7}	6
22	(United States) CoCo Vandeweghe	6^{4}	4

Second round
14	(Ukraine) Lesia Tsurenko	6	6
(Italy) Sara Errani	1	2
(Japan) Yuki Naito	2	6	6
(Germany) Katharina Gerlach	6	3	3

Qualifying competition
14	(Ukraine) Lesia Tsurenko	2	7^{7}	6
(Japan) Yuki Naito	6	6^{0}	2

=== Fifteenth qualifier ===
First round
15	(Romania) Mihaela Buzărnescu	2	6	6
PR	(China) Han Xinyun	6	4	2
(Switzerland) Susan Bandecchi	6	6
(Australia) Ellen Perez	4	2
(Australia) Lizette Cabrera	6	6
WC	(France) Émeline Dartron	3	1
(Spain) Andrea Lázaro García	3	4
31	(Sweden) Mirjam Björklund	6	6

Second round
15	(Romania) Mihaela Buzărnescu	6	6
(Switzerland) Susan Bandecchi	3	3
(Australia) Lizette Cabrera	2	2
31	(Sweden) Mirjam Björklund	6	6

Qualifying competition
15	(Romania) Mihaela Buzărnescu	1	3
31	(Sweden) Mirjam Björklund	6	6

=== Sixteenth qualifier ===
First round
16	(Brazil) Laura Pigossi	5	6	3
(Germany) Nastasja Schunk	7	3	6
(Paraguay) Verónica Cepede Royg	7	4	7^{10}
Anastasia Tikhonova	5	6	6^{7}
(Austria) Julia Grabher	4	6	6
(Switzerland) Stefanie Vögele	6	4	0
(Australia) Olivia Gadecki	7	3	5
17	(United States) Hailey Baptiste	5	6	7

Second round
(Germany) Nastasja Schunk	6	6
(Paraguay) Verónica Cepede Royg	3	1
(Austria) Julia Grabher	6	3	2
17	(United States) Hailey Baptiste	1	6	6

Qualifying competition
(Germany) Nastasja Schunk	5	6	2
17	(United States) Hailey Baptiste	7	4	6
