= 2021 French Open – Women's singles qualifying =

Women's singles qualifying
- 2021 French Open

Events
Singles	men	women		boys	girls
Doubles	men	women	mixed	boys	girls
WC Singles	men	women	quad
WC Doubles	men	women	quad
Legends	−45	45+	women

Qualification
Singles	men	women
← 2020 ·	French Open	· 2022 →

The 2021 French Open – Women's singles qualifying was a series of tennis matches that took place from 24 May to 28 May 2021 to determine the sixteen qualifiers into the main draw of the 2021 French Open – Women's singles, and, if necessary, the lucky losers.

This qualifying round expanded to 128 players in the tournament to allow 16 players will be qualified for the main draw. Previous years had 96 players in the draw as this is the last Grand Slam to change this feature.

== Seeds ==
1. (Russia) Vera Zvonareva (qualifying competition)
2. (Spain) Aliona Bolsova (first round)
3. (Russia) Liudmila Samsonova (first round)
4. (Hungary) Tímea Babos (second round)
5. (Italy) Sara Errani (second round)
6. (United States) Caty McNally (first round, retired)
7. (Germany) Anna-Lena Friedsam (qualifying competition)
8. (Russia) Anna Kalinskaya (first round)
9. (Italy) Elisabetta Cocciaretto (qualifying competition, lucky loser)
10. (Bulgaria) Tsvetana Pironkova (second round)
11. (Colombia) Camila Osorio (qualified)
12. (China) Wang Yafan (first round)
13. (Egypt) Mayar Sherif (second round)
14. (Romania) Irina Bara (qualified)
15. (United States) Kristie Ahn (first round)
16. (Bulgaria) Viktoriya Tomova (second round)
17. (Belgium) Greet Minnen (qualified)
18. (Slovakia) Anna Karolína Schmiedlová (qualified)
19. (Belgium) Ysaline Bonaventure (first round)
20. (United States) Claire Liu (second round)
21. (Ukraine) Katarina Zavatska (qualified)
22. (Switzerland) Stefanie Vögele (qualified)
23. (Slovakia) Viktória Kužmová (second round)
24. (Poland) Katarzyna Kawa (first round)
25. (Russia) Kamilla Rakhimova (first round)
26. (China) Wang Xinyu (first round)
27. (Belarus) Olga Govortsova (qualifying competition, lucky loser)
28. (Mexico) Renata Zarazúa (first round)
29. (Ukraine) Anhelina Kalinina (qualified)
30. (Ukraine) Lesia Tsurenko (second round, withdrew)
31. (United Kingdom) Harriet Dart (qualifying competition)
32. (China) Wang Xiyu (qualified)

== Qualifiers ==
1. (Slovakia) Anna Karolína Schmiedlová
2. (United States) Hailey Baptiste
3. (Serbia) Aleksandra Krunić
4. (Croatia) Ana Konjuh
5. (Georgia (country)) Ekaterine Gorgodze
6. (Chinese Taipei) Liang En-shuo
7. (United States) Varvara Lepchenko
8. (Spain) Lara Arruabarrena
9. (China) Wang Xiyu
10. (Australia) Storm Sanders
11. (Colombia) Camila Osorio
12. (Belgium) Greet Minnen
13. (Ukraine) Anhelina Kalinina
14. (Romania) Irina Bara
15. (Ukraine) Katarina Zavatska
16. (Switzerland) Stefanie Vögele

== Lucky losers ==
1. (Italy) Elisabetta Cocciaretto
2. (Belarus) Olga Govortsova

== Draw ==
=== First qualifier ===
First round
1	(Russia) Vera Zvonareva	6	6
(United Kingdom) Francesca Jones	1	2
(Georgia (country)) Mariam Bolkvadze	6	6
(Ukraine) Kateryna Bondarenko	4	3
(Germany) Tamara Korpatsch	6	6
(Japan) Yuki Naito	4	3
(China) Xun Fangying	1	2
18	(Slovakia) Anna Karolína Schmiedlová	6	6

Second round
1	(Russia) Vera Zvonareva	6	6
(Georgia (country)) Mariam Bolkvadze	3	1
(Germany) Tamara Korpatsch	0	4
18	(Slovakia) Anna Karolína Schmiedlová	6	6

Qualifying competition
1	(Russia) Vera Zvonareva	6	5	3
18	(Slovakia) Anna Karolína Schmiedlová	2	7	6

=== Second qualifier ===
First round
2	(Spain) Aliona Bolsova	2	3
(Austria) Julia Grabher	6	6
(Belgium) Marie Benoît	6	6
WC	(France) Julie Belgraver	1	0
PR	(Czech Republic) Tereza Smitková	4	2
(United States) Hailey Baptiste	6	6
(Canada) Rebecca Marino	6	2	0
20	(United States) Claire Liu	4	6	6

Second round
(Austria) Julia Grabher	6	4	6
(Belgium) Marie Benoît	3	6	2
(United States) Hailey Baptiste	6	6
20	(United States) Claire Liu	3	3

Qualifying competition
(Austria) Julia Grabher	6	5	3
(United States) Hailey Baptiste	3	7	6

=== Third qualifier ===
First round
3	(Russia) Liudmila Samsonova	6	2	2
(Serbia) Aleksandra Krunić	3	6	6
WC	(France) Aubane Droguet	2	6	0
(Romania) Elena-Gabriela Ruse	6	0	6
(Hungary) Dalma Gálfi	3	6	4
(Croatia) Jana Fett	6	1	6
(South Korea) Han Na-lae	3	3
27	(Belarus) Olga Govortsova	6	6

Second round
(Serbia) Aleksandra Krunić	7	6
(Romania) Elena-Gabriela Ruse	5	4
(Croatia) Jana Fett	6	2	5
27	(Belarus) Olga Govortsova	4	6	7

Qualifying competition
(Serbia) Aleksandra Krunić	6	6
27	(Belarus) Olga Govortsova	2	3

=== Fourth qualifier ===
First round
4	(Hungary) Tímea Babos	6	2	7^{7}
(China) You Xiaodi	4	6	6^{2}
(Croatia) Ana Konjuh	6	6
(United States) Robin Anderson	4	4
(Italy) Martina Di Giuseppe	7	3	7^{7}
(Russia) Varvara Flink	5	6	6^{3}
(Slovakia) Rebecca Šramková	6	6
26	(China) Wang Xinyu	4	3

Second round
4	(Hungary) Tímea Babos	3	5
(Croatia) Ana Konjuh	6	7
(Italy) Martina Di Giuseppe	6^{5}	4
(Slovakia) Rebecca Šramková	7^{7}	6

Qualifying competition
(Croatia) Ana Konjuh	7^{7}	6
(Slovakia) Rebecca Šramková	6^{1}	4

=== Fifth qualifier ===
First round
5	(Italy) Sara Errani	6	7
(United States) Sachia Vickery	3	5
(Romania) Laura Ioana Paar	2	1
(Spain) Nuria Párrizas Díaz	6	6
WC	(France) Salma Djoubri	3	2
(Bulgaria) Elitsa Kostova	6	6
(Georgia (country)) Ekaterine Gorgodze	6	4	6
28	(Mexico) Renata Zarazúa	2	6	4

Second round
5	(Italy) Sara Errani	6	4	2
(Spain) Nuria Párrizas Díaz	4	6	6
(Bulgaria) Elitsa Kostova	6^{5}	3
(Georgia (country)) Ekaterine Gorgodze	7^{7}	6

Qualifying competition
(Spain) Nuria Párrizas Díaz	3	4
(Georgia (country)) Ekaterine Gorgodze	6	6

=== Sixth qualifier ===
First round
6	(United States) Caty McNally	1^{r}
PR	(Chinese Taipei) Liang En-shuo	4
(United States) Asia Muhammad	6	5	6
(United States) Whitney Osuigwe	1	7	3
(China) Yuan Yue	3	4
(Romania) Gabriela Talabă	6	6
(Austria) Barbara Haas	4	6	1
31	(United Kingdom) Harriet Dart	6	4	6

Second round
PR	(Chinese Taipei) Liang En-shuo	7^{11}	6
(United States) Asia Muhammad	6^{9}	4
(Romania) Gabriela Talabă	3	6	3
31	(United Kingdom) Harriet Dart	6	2	6

Qualifying competition
PR	(Chinese Taipei) Liang En-shuo	6	6
31	(United Kingdom) Harriet Dart	2	2

=== Seventh qualifier ===
First round
7	(Germany) Anna-Lena Friedsam	6	6
(Chile) Daniela Seguel	0	3
(Paraguay) Verónica Cepede Royg	6	2	6
(Netherlands) Indy de Vroome	0	6	4
WC	(France) Tessah Andrianjafitrimo	4	6	6^{4}
(Germany) Mona Barthel	6	3	7^{7}
(United States) Varvara Lepchenko	6	1	7
25	(Russia) Kamilla Rakhimova	4	6	5

Second round
7	(Germany) Anna-Lena Friedsam	6	7
(Paraguay) Verónica Cepede Royg	1	5
(Germany) Mona Barthel	1	5
(United States) Varvara Lepchenko	6	7

Qualifying competition
7	(Germany) Anna-Lena Friedsam	1	3
(United States) Varvara Lepchenko	6	6

=== Eighth qualifier ===
First round
8	(Russia) Anna Kalinskaya	5	4
(Germany) Antonia Lottner	7	6
(United States) Usue Maitane Arconada	6^{2}	2
(Spain) Lara Arruabarrena	7^{7}	6
WC	(Canada) Carol Zhao	2	6	6
(Russia) Valeria Savinykh	6	2	0
WC	(France) Séléna Janicijevic	4	6^{3}
23	(Slovakia) Viktória Kužmová	6	7^{7}

Second round
(Germany) Antonia Lottner	7^{7}	2	4
(Spain) Lara Arruabarrena	6^{5}	6	6
WC	(Canada) Carol Zhao	7	6
23	(Slovakia) Viktória Kužmová	5	2

Qualifying competition
(Spain) Lara Arruabarrena	6	6
WC	(Canada) Carol Zhao	4	2

=== Ninth qualifier ===
First round
9	(Italy) Elisabetta Cocciaretto	6	2	6
(Ukraine) Daria Snigur	3	6	1
(Australia) Priscilla Hon	5	3
(United States) Francesca Di Lorenzo	7	6
(Spain) Georgina García Pérez	3	4
(Japan) Mayo Hibi	6	6
(Australia) Lizette Cabrera	2	1
32	(China) Wang Xiyu	6	6

Second round
9	(Italy) Elisabetta Cocciaretto	7^{7}	6
(United States) Francesca Di Lorenzo	6^{3}	0
(Japan) Mayo Hibi	0	3
32	(China) Wang Xiyu	6	6

Qualifying competition
9	(Italy) Elisabetta Cocciaretto	3	7^{10}	3
32	(China) Wang Xiyu	6	6^{8}	6

=== Tenth qualifier ===
First round
10	(Bulgaria) Tsvetana Pironkova	6^{7}	6	6
(United States) Caroline Dolehide	7^{9}	2	4
(Switzerland) Susan Bandecchi	7^{7}	6
(Netherlands) Lesley Pattinama Kerkhove	6^{5}	3
(Turkey) Çağla Büyükakçay	6	6
(China) Lu Jiajing	4	3
(Australia) Storm Sanders	6	6
24	(Poland) Katarzyna Kawa	3	1

Second round
10	(Bulgaria) Tsvetana Pironkova	4	6	3
(Switzerland) Susan Bandecchi	6	2	6
(Turkey) Çağla Büyükakçay	2	4
(Australia) Storm Sanders	6	6

Qualifying competition
(Switzerland) Susan Bandecchi	5	5
(Australia) Storm Sanders	7	7

=== Eleventh qualifier ===
First round
11	(Colombia) Camila Osorio	6	6
(Serbia) Olga Danilović	3	2
(Netherlands) Richèl Hogenkamp	6	6
(United Kingdom) Samantha Murray Sharan	3	4
WC	(France) Carole Monnet	6	6
(Bulgaria) Isabella Shinikova	3	3
(Romania) Monica Niculescu	6	4	6
19	(Belgium) Ysaline Bonaventure	2	6	2

Second round
11	(Colombia) Camila Osorio	6	6
(Netherlands) Richèl Hogenkamp	4	0
WC	(France) Carole Monnet	2	4
(Romania) Monica Niculescu	6	6

Qualifying competition
11	(Colombia) Camila Osorio	6	4
(Romania) Monica Niculescu	3	3^{r}

=== Twelfth qualifier ===
First round
12	(China) Wang Yafan	3	1
PR	(Romania) Alexandra Dulgheru	6	6
(Russia) Vitalia Diatchenko	6^{5}	6	5
(Australia) Ellen Perez	7^{7}	3	7
(Australia) Arina Rodionova	6	1	4
(India) Ankita Raina	3	6	6
(Poland) Urszula Radwańska	7	3	1
17	(Belgium) Greet Minnen	5	6	6

Second round
PR	(Romania) Alexandra Dulgheru	0	6	6^{2}
(Australia) Ellen Perez	6	4	7^{7}
(India) Ankita Raina	2	0
17	(Belgium) Greet Minnen	6	6

Qualifying competition
(Australia) Ellen Perez	5	4
17	(Belgium) Greet Minnen	7	6

=== Thirteenth qualifier ===
First round
13	(Egypt) Mayar Sherif	4	7	6
(Poland) Maja Chwalińska	6	5	2
(Romania) Jaqueline Cristian	6	7
PR	(United States) Louisa Chirico	1	5
WC	(France) Loïs Boisson	6	4	6
(Spain) Eva Guerrero Álvarez	0	6	3
(Russia) Marina Melnikova	5	1
29	(Ukraine) Anhelina Kalinina	7	6

Second round
13	(Egypt) Mayar Sherif	5	7	6^{1}
(Romania) Jaqueline Cristian	7	5	7^{7}
WC	(France) Loïs Boisson	4	3
29	(Ukraine) Anhelina Kalinina	6	6

Qualifying competition
(Romania) Jaqueline Cristian	4	1
29	(Ukraine) Anhelina Kalinina	6	6

=== Fourteenth qualifier ===
First round
14	(Romania) Irina Bara	7	6
Alt	(United Kingdom) Jodie Burrage	5	3
(Hungary) Réka Luca Jani	2	3
(Luxembourg) Mandy Minella	6	6
(Croatia) Tereza Mrdeža	7^{7}	1	6^{3}
(Poland) Magdalena Fręch	6^{4}	6	7^{7}
(United States) Danielle Lao	1	6	6^{0}
30	(Ukraine) Lesia Tsurenko	6	4	7^{7}

Second round
14	(Romania) Irina Bara	3	6	6
(Luxembourg) Mandy Minella	6	3	2
(Poland) Magdalena Fręch	w/o
30	(Ukraine) Lesia Tsurenko

Qualifying competition
14	(Romania) Irina Bara	7	6
(Poland) Magdalena Fręch	5	2

=== Fifteenth qualifier ===
First round
15	(United States) Kristie Ahn	6	3	4
(United States) CoCo Vandeweghe	3	6	6
WC	(Australia) Olivia Gadecki	6	0	1
(Russia) Anastasia Gasanova	4	6	6
(Slovakia) Kristína Kučová	6	6
(Serbia) Natalija Kostić	3	2
(Spain) Cristina Bucșa	2	1
21	(Ukraine) Katarina Zavatska	6	6

Second round
(United States) CoCo Vandeweghe	2	7	2
(Russia) Anastasia Gasanova	6	5	6
(Slovakia) Kristína Kučová	6	3	3
21	(Ukraine) Katarina Zavatska	4	6	6

Qualifying competition
(Russia) Anastasia Gasanova	2	1
21	(Ukraine) Katarina Zavatska	6	6

=== Sixteenth qualifier ===
First round
16	(Bulgaria) Viktoriya Tomova	6	6
(Russia) Natalia Vikhlyantseva	3	4
(Japan) Kurumi Nara	6	6
(Italy) Giulia Gatto-Monticone	4	2
(United States) Grace Min	6	6
(Turkey) Pemra Özgen	3	4
(Switzerland) Leonie Küng	5	1
22	(Switzerland) Stefanie Vögele	7	6

Second round
16	(Bulgaria) Viktoriya Tomova	3	6	4
(Japan) Kurumi Nara	6	0	6
(United States) Grace Min	5	4
22	(Switzerland) Stefanie Vögele	7	6

Qualifying competition
(Japan) Kurumi Nara	3	6	2
22	(Switzerland) Stefanie Vögele	6	3	6
