= 2023 Burg-Wächter Ladies Open – Doubles =

Doubles
- 2023 Burg-Wächter Ladies Open

Final
- Champions: (Belgium) Greet Minnen (Belgium) Yanina Wickmayer
- Runners-up: (United Kingdom) Freya Christie (United Kingdom) Ali Collins
- Score: 6–1, 6–3

Events
Singles	Doubles
← 2022 ·	AK Ladies Open	· 2024 →

Mariam Bolkvadze and Samantha Murray Sharan were the defending champions but chose not to participate.

Greet Minnen and Yanina Wickmayer won the title, defeating Freya Christie and Ali Collins in the final, 6–1, 6–3.

== Seeds ==
1. (Belgium) Greet Minnen / (Belgium) Yanina Wickmayer (champions)
2. (United Kingdom) Freya Christie / (United Kingdom) Ali Collins (final)
3. Alena Fomina-Klotz / (Germany) Julia Lohoff (first round)
4. (Indonesia) Jessy Rompies / (India) Prarthana Thombare (semifinals)

== Draw ==
Key

- Q = Qualifier
- WC = Wild card
- LL = Lucky loser
- Alt = Alternate
- ITF = ITF entry
- PR = Protected ranking
- SR = Special ranking
- SE = Special exempt
- JE = Junior exempt
- JR = Junior Accelerator Programme entrant
- CO = College Accelerator Programme entrant
- NG = Next Gen Accelerator Program entrant
- w/o = Walkover
- r = Retired
- d = Defaulted

First round
1	(Belgium) G Minnen (Belgium) Y Wickmayer	6	6
(Germany) J Middendorf (Germany) Jo Steur	2	1
(Austria) M Klaffner (Austria) S Kraus	6	6
(Greece) S Sakellaridi (United States) C Scholl	4	4
4	(Indonesia) J Rompies (India) P Thombare	6	3	[10]
(Germany) M Guth (Germany) A Wirges	2	6	[6]
(Germany) T Morderger (Germany) Y Morderger	3	6^{3}
(Germany) N Noha Akugue (Germany) E Seidel	6	7^{7}
(Belgium) M Kempen (Switzerland) X Knoll	6	6
P Kudermetova (Serbia) L Radivojević	4	4
(Romania) J Cristian (Georgia (country)) E Gorgodze	7^{7}	4	[10]
3	A Fomina-Klotz (Germany) J Lohoff	6^{2}	6	[4]
(United Kingdom) E Appleton (Netherlands) I Haverlag	7	5	[10]
(Poland) M Kubka (Serbia) N Stevanović	5	7	[8]
WC	(Germany) A Kuparev; E Kuznetsova	2	3
2	(United Kingdom) F Christie (United Kingdom) A Collins	6	6

Quarterfinals
1	(Belgium) G Minnen (Belgium) Y Wickmayer	6	6
(Austria) M Klaffner (Austria) S Kraus	3	0
4	(Indonesia) J Rompies (India) P Thombare	6	6
(Germany) N Noha Akugue (Germany) E Seidel	3	4
(Belgium) M Kempen (Switzerland) X Knoll	3	4
(Romania) J Cristian (Georgia (country)) E Gorgodze	6	6
(United Kingdom) E Appleton (Netherlands) I Haverlag	7^{7}	3	[8]
2	(United Kingdom) F Christie (United Kingdom) A Collins	6^{5}	6	[10]

Semifinals
1	(Belgium) G Minnen (Belgium) Y Wickmayer	6	6
4	(Indonesia) J Rompies (India) P Thombare	0	2
(Romania) J Cristian (Georgia (country)) E Gorgodze	2	7^{7}	[8]
2	(United Kingdom) F Christie (United Kingdom) A Collins	6	6^{3}	[10]

Final
1	(Belgium) G Minnen (Belgium) Y Wickmayer	6	6
2	(United Kingdom) F Christie (United Kingdom) A Collins	1	3
