= AK Ladies Open =

- 2024 Burg-Wächter Ladies Open

ITF Women's Tour
- Event name: AK Ladies Open
- Location: Altenkirchen, Germany
- Venue: SRS Sportpark
- Category: ITF Women's World Tennis Tour
- Surface: Carpet / indoors
- Draw: 32S/24Q/16D
- Prize money: $60,000
- Website: www.ak-ladies-open.de

The AK Ladies Open is a tournament for professional female tennis players played on indoor carpet courts. The event is classified as a $60,000 ITF Women's World Tennis Tour tournament and has been held in Altenkirchen, Germany, since 2014.

== Past finals ==
=== Singles ===
Year	Champion	Runner-up	Score
2026	(Germany) Noma Noha Akugue	Julia Avdeeva	6–2, 6–1
2025	Julia Avdeeva	(Ukraine) Daria Snigur	6–3, 6–3
2024	Julia Avdeeva	(Belgium) Alison Van Uytvanck	6–4, 6–4
2023	(Denmark) Clara Tauson	(Belgium) Greet Minnen	7–6^{(7–5)}, 4–6, 6–2
2022	(Belgium) Greet Minnen	(Ukraine) Daria Snigur	6–4, 6–3
2021	(Denmark) Clara Tauson	(Switzerland) Simona Waltert	3–6, 6–1, 6–3
2020	(Germany) Eva Lys	(Netherlands) Bibiane Schoofs	6–2, 6–4
2019	(China) Ma Shuyue	(Belgium) Maryna Zanevska	6–4, 5–7, 7–5
2018	(United Kingdom) Harriet Dart	(Czech Republic) Karolína Muchová	7–6^{(7–5)}, 6–2
2017	(Netherlands) Bibiane Schoofs	(Netherlands) Quirine Lemoine	7–5, 7–5
2016	(Belgium) Ysaline Bonaventure	(Netherlands) Arantxa Rus	6–3, 6–3
2015	(Germany) Carina Witthöft	(Germany) Antonia Lottner	6–3, 6–4
2014	(Belarus) Iryna Shymanovich	(Hungary) Réka Luca Jani	6–1, 7–6^{(7–3)}

=== Doubles ===
Year	Champions	Runners-up	Score
2026	(Poland) Martyna Kubka (Lithuania) Justina Mikulskytė	(Germany) Tessa Brockmann (Germany) Nastasja Schunk	6–1, 6–2
2025	(Belgium) Marie Benoît (Slovenia) Dalila Jakupović	(United Kingdom) Emily Appleton (Netherlands) Isabelle Haverlag	7–5, 7–6^{(8–6)}
2024	(Poland) Maja Chwalińska (Czech Republic) Jesika Malečková	(Germany) Julia Lohoff (Switzerland) Conny Perrin	6–4, 7–5
2023	(Belgium) Greet Minnen (Belgium) Yanina Wickmayer	(United Kingdom) Freya Christie (United Kingdom) Ali Collins	6–1, 6–3
2022	(Georgia (country)) Mariam Bolkvadze (United Kingdom) Samantha Murray Sharan	(Switzerland) Susan Bandecchi (Switzerland) Simona Waltert	6–3, 7–5
2021	(Poland) Paula Kania-Choduń (Germany) Julia Wachaczyk	(Switzerland) Viktorija Golubic (Switzerland) Ylena In-Albon	7–6^{(7–5)}, 6–4
2020	(Romania) Andreea Mitu (Romania) Laura-Ioana Paar	(United Kingdom) Anna Popescu (United States) Chiara Scholl	7–5, 6–2
2019	(Spain) Cristina Bucșa (Netherlands) Rosalie van der Hoek	(Belgium) Marie Benoît (Poland) Katarzyna Piter	5–7, 6–3, [12–10]
2018	(Latvia) Diāna Marcinkēviča (Poland) Katarzyna Piter	(Greece) Valentini Grammatikopoulou (Belgium) Maryna Zanevska	walkover
2017	(Romania) Alexandra Cadanțu (Sweden) Cornelia Lister	(United Kingdom) Tara Moore (Switzerland) Conny Perrin	6–2, 3–6, [11–9]
2016	(Belgium) Ysaline Bonaventure (Switzerland) Xenia Knoll	(Israel) Deniz Khazaniuk (Russia) Maria Marfutina	6–1, 6–4
2015	(Germany) Antonia Lottner (Croatia) Ana Vrljić	(Austria) Sandra Klemenschits (Germany) Tatjana Maria	6–4, 3–6, [11–9]
2014	(Germany) Carolin Daniels (Germany) Laura Schaeder	(Italy) Claudia Giovine (Germany) Justine Ozga	1–6, 6–4, [10–7]
