= Julia Avdeeva =

Russian tennis player (born 2002)

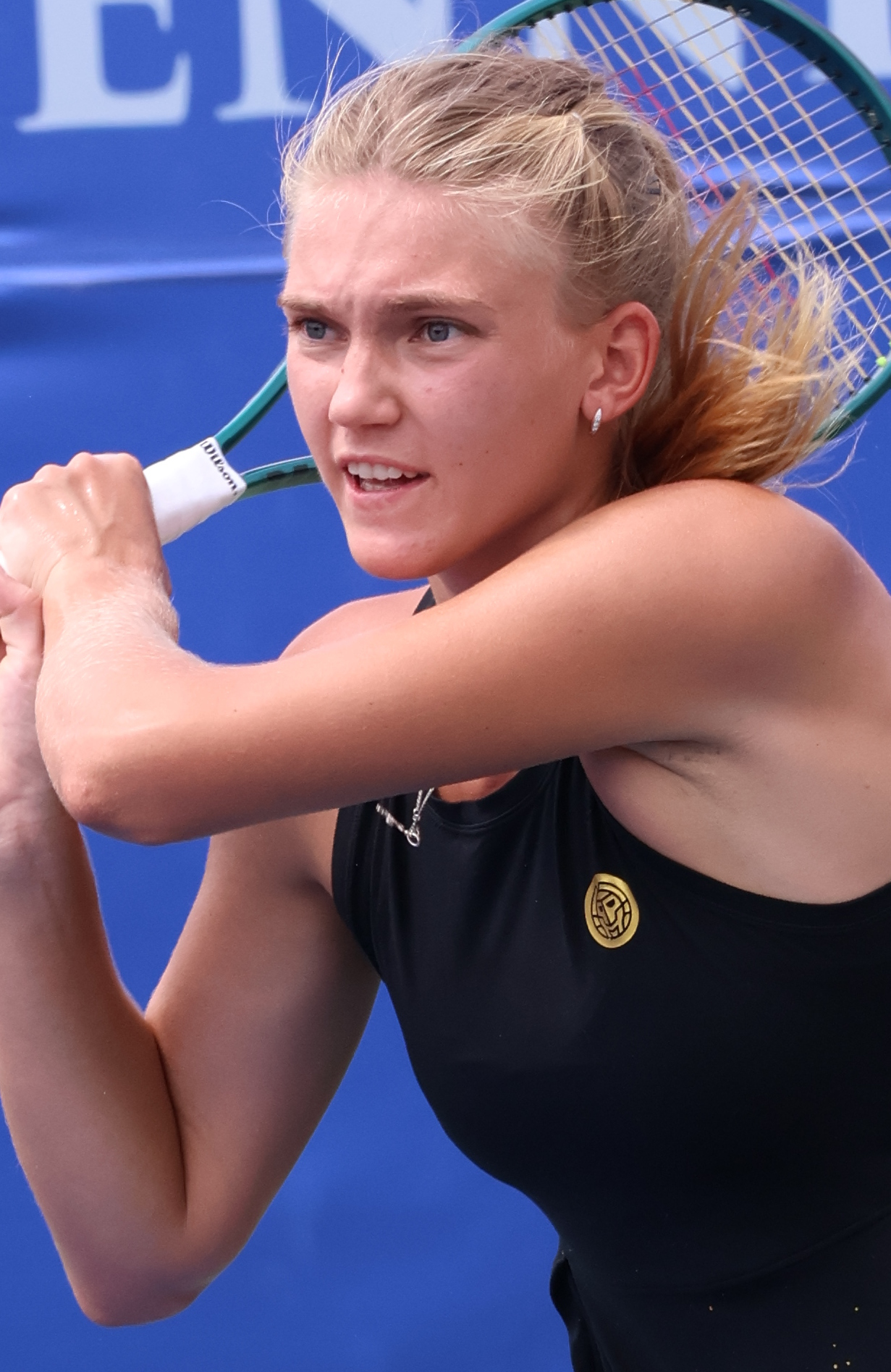
- Avdeeva at the 2024 Cary Tennis Classic
- Full name: Julia Antonovna Avdeeva
- Native name: Юлия Антоновна Авдеева
- Country (sports): Russia
- Residence: Saint Petersburg, Russia
- Born: 6 July 2002 (age 24)
- Prize money: $322,826

Singles
- Career record: 207–137
- Career titles: 7 ITF
- Highest ranking: No. 188 (20 May 2024)
- Current ranking: No. 191 (15 June 2026)

Grand Slam singles results
- French Open: 1R (2024)
- Wimbledon: Q1 (2024)
- US Open: Q2 (2026)

Doubles
- Career record: 37–36
- Career titles: 0
- Highest ranking: No. 365 (16 September 2024)
- Current ranking: No. 915 (15 June 2026)
- Last updated on: 15 June 2026.

Julia Antonovna Avdeeva (Russian: Юлия Антоновна Авдеева; born 6 July 2002) is a Russian professional tennis player.

She has a career-high singles ranking by the WTA of No. 188, achieved on 20 May 2024, and a doubles ranking of No. 365, achieved on 16 September 2024.

== Career ==
Avdeeva won her first major ITF title at the 2023 Hamburg Ladies & Gents Cup. She also reached the doubles final with partner Ekaterina Maklakova, but lost to German twins Tayisiya and Yana Morderger.

In February 2024, she won the Burg-Wächter Ladies Open, beating Polina Kudermetova, Berfu Cengiz, Marina Bassols Ribera, Océane Dodin, and Alison Van Uytvanck in the final. In April, she made her WTA 125 debut as a lucky loser at the Oeiras Ladies Open, where she reached the second round.

Ranked No. 188, she qualified for her first major tournament at the 2024 French Open by defeating Emiliana Arango, Margaux Rouvroy, and Olivia Gadecki, but lost to third seed Coco Gauff in the first round of the main draw.

== Grand Slam singles performance timeline ==
Key
W	F	SF	QF	#R	RR	Q#	P#	DNQ	A	Z#	PO	G	S	B	NMS	NTI	P	NH

(W) winner; (F) finalist; (SF) semifinalist; (QF) quarterfinalist; (#R) rounds 4, 3, 2, 1; (RR) round-robin stage; (Q#) qualification round; (P#) preliminary round; (DNQ) did not qualify; (A) absent; (Z#) Davis/Fed Cup Zonal Group (with number indication) or (PO) play-off; (G) gold, (S) silver or (B) bronze Olympic/Paralympic medal; (NMS) not a Masters tournament; (NTI) not a Tier I tournament; (P) postponed; (NH) not held; (SR) strike rate (events won / competed); (W–L) win–loss record.
To avoid confusion and double counting, these charts are updated at the conclusion of a tournament or when the player's participation has ended.

Tournament	2024	2025	2026	SR	W–L
Grand Slam tournaments
Australian Open	A	A	A	0 / 0	0–0
French Open	1R	A	Q2	0 / 1	0–1
Wimbledon	Q1	A	A	0 / 0	0–0
US Open	Q1	A	Q2	0 / 0	0–0
Win–loss	0–1	0–0	0–0	0 / 1	0–1

== ITF Circuit finals ==
=== Singles: 17 (7 titles, 10 runner-ups) ===
Legend $60/75,000 tournaments (5–2) $40,000 tournaments (0–1) $25/35,000 tournaments (2–3) $15,000 tournaments (0–4)	Finals by surface Hard (3–2) Clay (2–7) Carpet (2–1)

Result	W–L	Date	Tournament	Tier	Surface	Opponent	Score
Loss	0–1	Dec 2020	ITF Antalya, Turkey	W15	Clay	(Russia) Amina Anshba	2–6, 5–7
Finalist (Note: The final was abandoned due to poor weather with Sakellaridi leading 3–1. Both players split ranking points and prize money.)	NP	Jan 2021	ITF Antalya, Turkey	W15	Clay	(Greece) Sapfo Sakellaridi	cancelled
Loss	0–2	May 2021	ITF Antalya, Turkey	W15	Clay	(Australia) Olivia Gadecki	3–6, 2–6
Loss	0–3	May 2021	ITF Antalya, Turkey	W15	Clay	(Russia) Polina Leykina	1–6, 0–6
Loss	0–4	Jun 2021	ITF Alkmaar, Netherlands	W15	Clay	(Netherlands) Quirine Lemoine	6–7^{(6)}, 1–6
Loss	0–5	Aug 2022	ITF Brașov, Romania	W25	Clay	(Romania) Andreea Roșca	1–6, 7–6^{(5)}, 6–7^{(1)}
Win	1–5	May 2023	ITF Kuršumlijska Banja, Serbia	W25	Clay	(North Macedonia) Lina Gjorcheska	6–1, 6–4
Loss	1–6	Jun 2023	ITF Troisdorf, Germany	W25	Clay	(Germany) Carolina Kuhl	6–3, 4–6, 4–6
Loss	1–7	Oct 2023	ITF Reims, France	W25	Hard	(Belgium) Alison Van Uytvanck	4–6, 4–6
Win	2–7	Oct 2023	Hamburg Ladies & Gents Cup, Germany	W60	Hard (i)	(Germany) Ella Seidel	6–4, 7–6^{(2)}
Win	3–7	Feb 2024	AK Ladies Open, Germany	W75	Carpet (i)	(Belgium) Alison Van Uytvanck	6–4, 6–4
Win	4–7	Sep 2024	ITF Reims, France	W35	Hard (i)	(France) Margaux Rouvroy	3–6, 6–3, 6–4
Win	5–7	Feb 2025	AK Ladies Open, Germany	W75	Carpet (i)	(Ukraine) Daria Snigur	6–3, 6–3
Loss	5–8	Sep 2025	ITF Saint-Palais-sur-Mer, France	W50	Clay	(France) Alice Tubello	2–6, 6–7^{(5)}
Loss	5–9	Jan 2026	ITF Leszno, Poland	W75	Hard (i)	(Slovakia) Mia Pohánková	3–6, 2–6
Win	6–9	Feb 2026	Open Andrézieux-Bouthéon 42, France	W75	Hard (i)	(Ukraine) Veronika Podrez	6–3, 7–5
Loss	6–10	Feb 2026	AK Ladies Open, Germany	W75	Carpet (i)	(Germany) Noma Noha Akugue	2–6, 1–6
Win	7–10	Jun 2026	Macha Lake Open, Czech Republic	W75	Clay	(Netherlands) Eva Vedder	1–6, 6–3, 6–2

=== Doubles: 6 (6 runner-ups) ===
Legend $60/75,000 tournaments $25,000 tournaments $15,000 tournaments	Finals by surface Hard (0–3) Clay (0–3)

Result	W–L	Date	Tournament	Tier	Surface	Partner	Opponents	Score
Loss	0–1	Apr 2022	ITF Antalya, Turkey	W15	Clay	(Greece) Sapfo Sakellaridi	Vlada Koval; Daria Lodikova	4–6, 6–3, [4–10]
Loss	0–2	Aug 2023	ITF Leipzig, Germany	W25	Clay	(Romania) Arina Vasilescu	(France) Estelle Cascino (Australia) Seone Mendez	2–6, 7–6^{(4)}, [8–10]
Loss	0–3	Oct 2023	ITF Reims, France	W25	Hard (i)	Anna Chekanskaya	(Poland) Martyna Kubka (Sweden) Lisa Zaar	3–6, 2–6
Loss	0–4	Oct 2023	Hamburg Ladies & Gents Cup, Germany	W60	Hard (i)	Ekaterina Maklakova	(Germany) Tayisiya Morderger (Germany) Yana Morderger	1–6, 4–6
Loss	0–5	Sep 2024	ITF Féminin Le Neubourg, France	W75	Hard	Ekaterina Maklakova	(Israel) Lina Glushko; Anastasia Tikhonova	3–6, 1–6
Loss	0–6	Apr 2025	Koper Open, Slovenia	W75	Clay	Ekaterina Maklakova	(Slovenia) Kristina Novak (Czech Republic) Ivana Šebestová	5–7, 6–0, [6–10]
