= Altenkirchen =

- Town
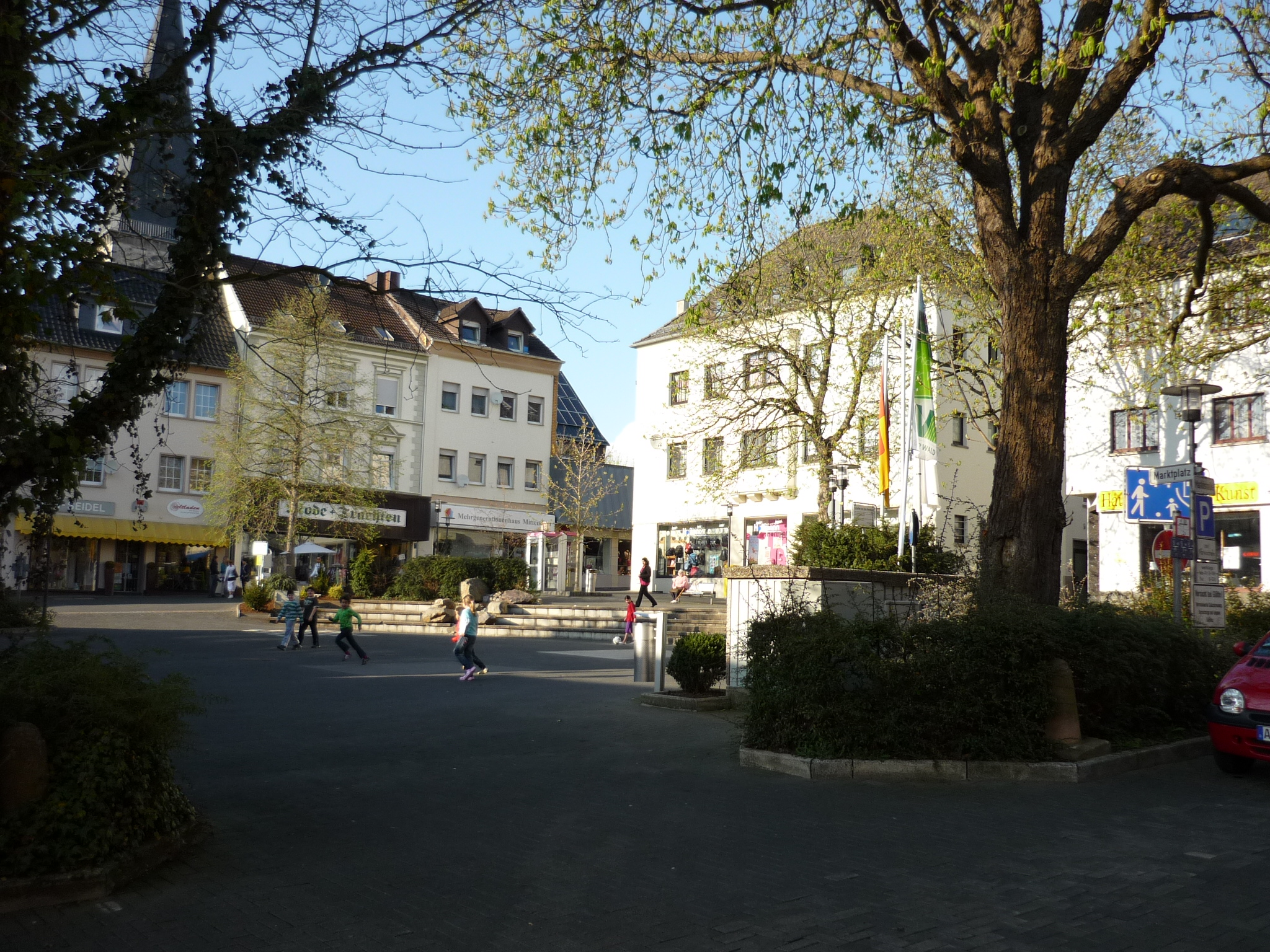
- Town square

- Coat of arms

- Location of Altenkirchen within Altenkirchen district
- Interactive map of Altenkirchen
- Location within Germany Location within Rhineland-Palatinate
- Coordinates: 50°41′14″N 07°38′44″E
- Country: Germany
- State: Rhineland-Palatinate
- District: Altenkirchen
- Municipal assoc.: Altenkirchen-Flammersfeld

Government
  - Mayor (2019–24): Matthias Gibhardt (SPD)

Area
  - Total: 10.98 km^{2} (4.24 sq mi)
- Elevation: 230 m (750 ft)

Population (2025-12-31)
  - Total: 6,797
  - Density: 619.0/km^{2} (1,603/sq mi)
- Time zone: UTC+01:00 (CET)
  - Summer (DST): UTC+02:00 (CEST)
- Postal codes: 57601–57610
- Dialling codes: 02681
- Vehicle registration: AK
- Website: www.altenkirchen.de

Altenkirchen (German pronunciation: [ˌaltn̩ˈkɪʁçn̩]) is a town in Rhineland-Palatinate, Germany, capital of the district of Altenkirchen. It is located approximately 40 km east of Bonn and 50 km north of Koblenz. Altenkirchen is the seat of the Verbandsgemeinde ("collective municipality") Altenkirchen-Flammersfeld.

== Population development ==
Year	Inhabitants
1787	112
1800	450
1830	990
1853	1,497
1861	1,700
1900	2,044
1933	3,333
1939	3,562
1950	4,189
1962	4,618
1984	4,553
1999	6,640
2014	6,162

== Geography ==
- Lahrer Herrlichkeit, a landscape region in the collective municipality of Flammersfeld

== Notable people ==
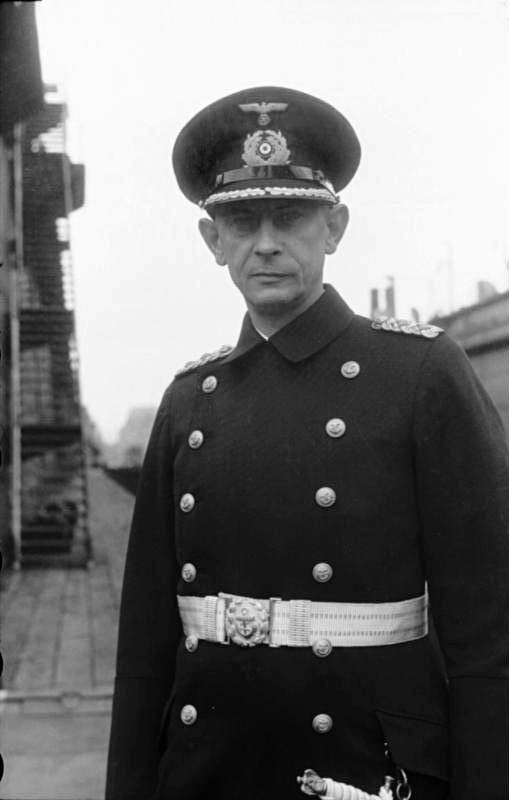
Ernst Lindemann

- Dirk Adorf (born 1969), race car driver
- Sabine Bätzing-Lichtenthäler (born 1975), politician (SPD)
- Ernst Lindemann (1894–1941), an officer of the Imperial Navy and later the Navy commander of the battleship Bismarck
- Marie Gülich (born 1994), WNBA player.

== Other personalities ==
The following figures are not native Altenkirchen people, but have worked or lived in the city:

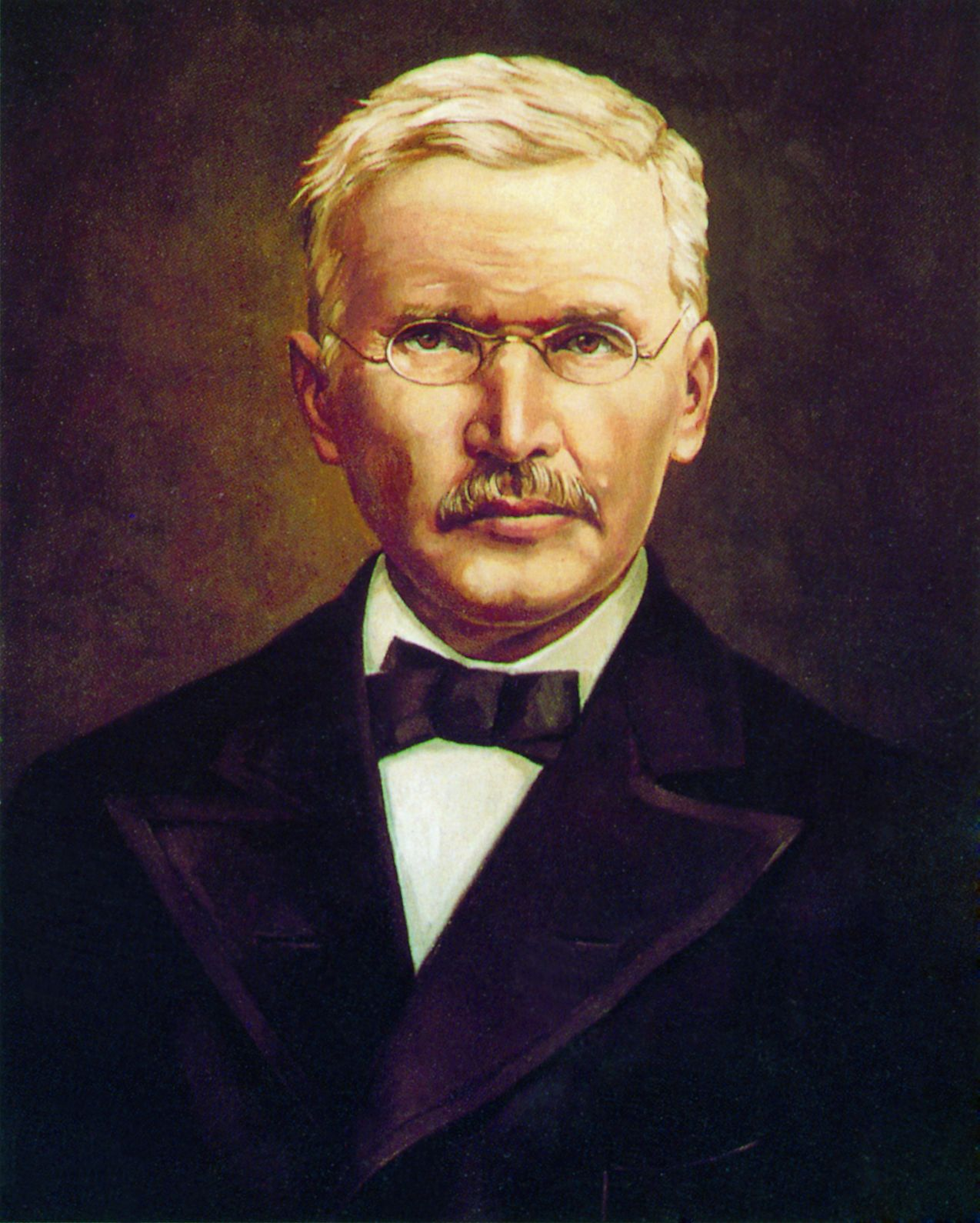
Friedrioch Wilhelm Raiffeisen

- Wilhelm Boden (1890–1961), former Prime Ministers of Rheinland-Pfalz
- Ludwig Julius Budge (1811–1888), physician
- Bernhard Grzimek (1909–1987), zoologist, cooperated in 1938 with the District Veterinary Office in Altenkirchen to combat bovine tuberculosis
- François Séverin Marceau (1769–1796), French general
- Krzysztof Meyer (born 1943), composer
- Hans Nüsslein (1910–1991), German tennis player, professional world champion in 1933, 1936, 1937
- Friedrich Wilhelm Raiffeisen (1818–1888), social reformer
- Ewald Schnug (* 1954), agricultural researcher, professor, Honorary-President of the International Scientific Center for Fertilizers

== Transport ==
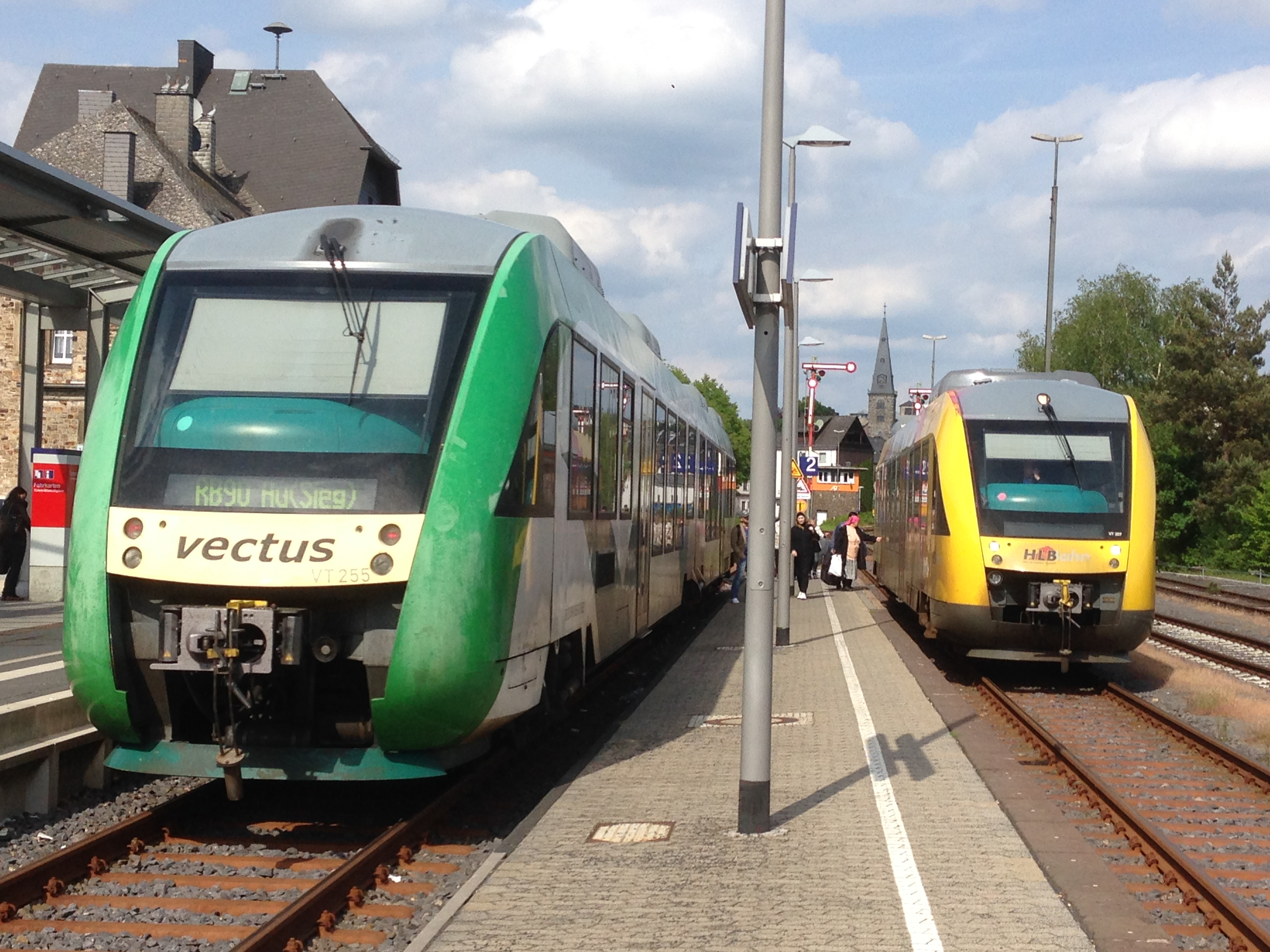
Altenkirchen station, passenger train section

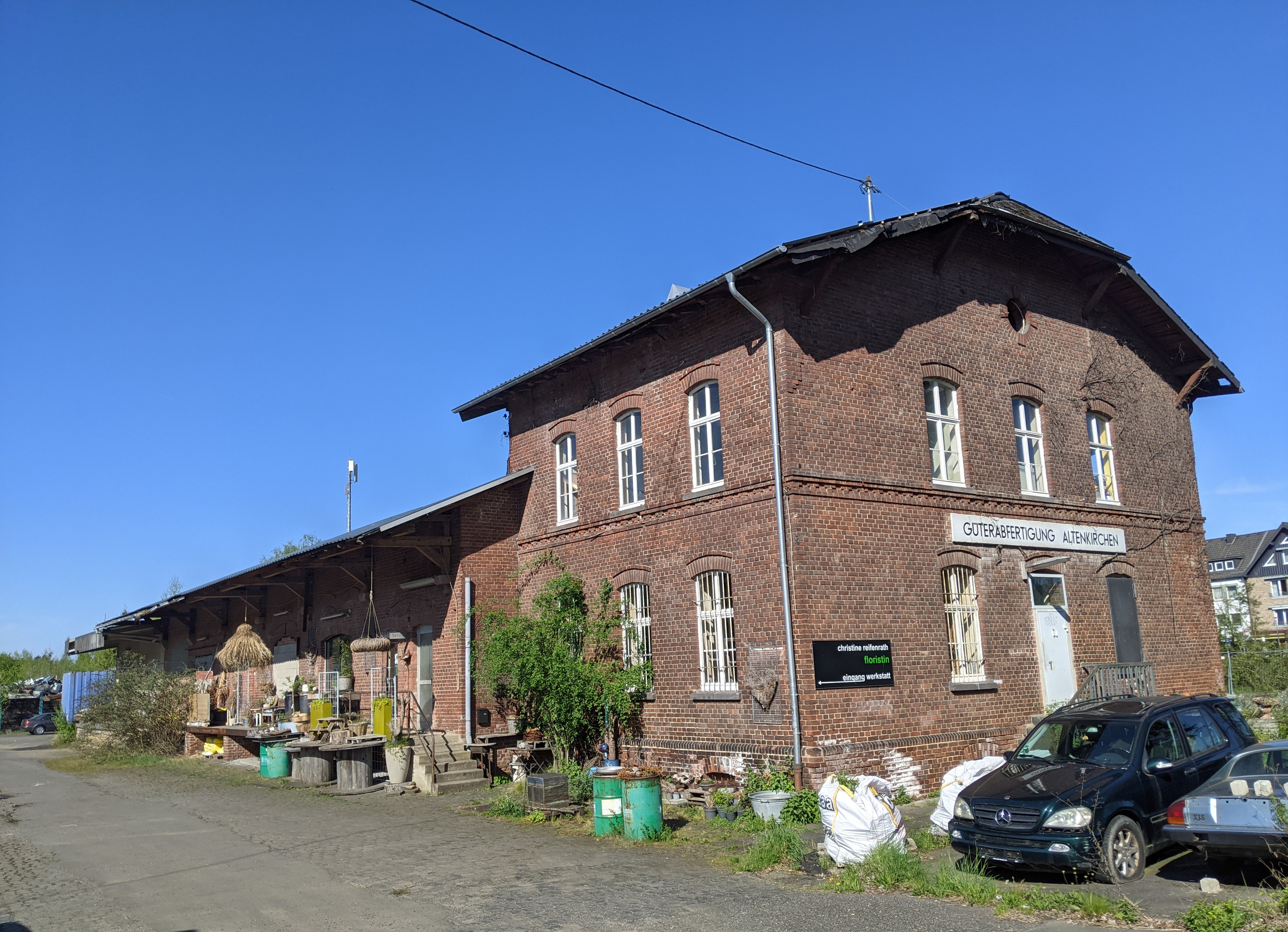
Altenkirchen station, fright section

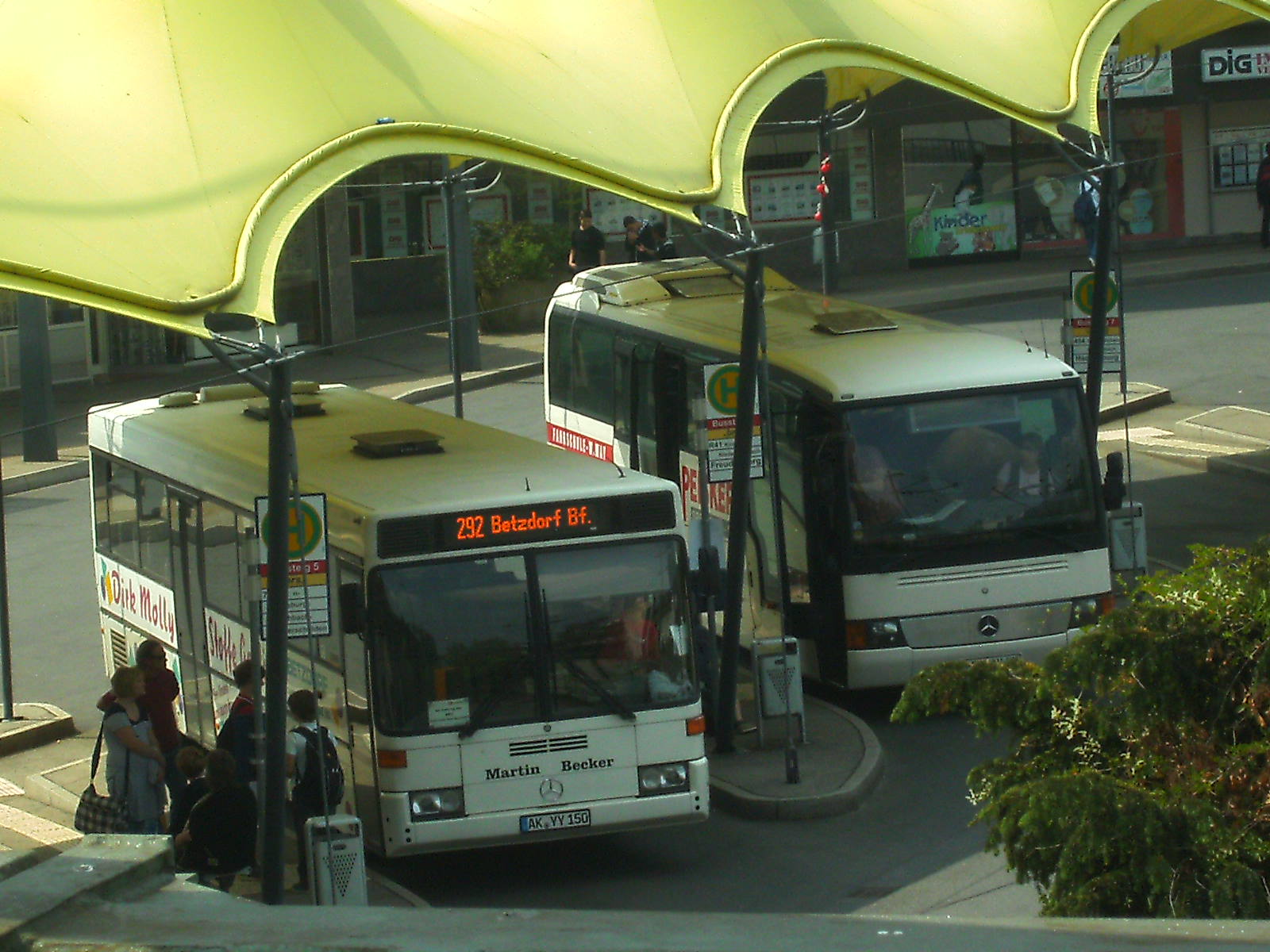
Local bus station ZOB Altenkirchen

Halbmeilenstein at federal highway 8 in Altenkirchen

Altenkirchen (Westerw) station is connected to the Limburg-Altenkirchen railway as well as the Engers-Au railway, public rail transport line is RB90 from Limburg via Diez Ost, Westerburg, Nistertal-Bad Marienberg, Hachenburg, Altenkirchen, Au (Sieg) and Betzdorf (Sieg) to Siegen, served by the Hessische Landesbahn (HLB), section Dreiländerbahn.

Altenkirchen town and Altenkirchen district are located on the area of the transport association Verkehrsverbund Rhein-Mosel (VRM), zone number 910.

Altenkirchen also is served by the local bus lines 120, 121, 122, 123, 124, 126, 127, 136, 250, 251, 255, 280, 285, 287, 289, 408, 416 and 934.

Most important bus stations in the city of Altenkirchen are the central bus station (Zentraler Omnibusbahbahnhof (ZOB) Altenkirchen, Altenkirchen Bahnhof (Altenkirchen train station), Lindenstr./Post and Weyerdamm./Schulzentrum.

Altenkirchen train station also has a Bike and ride- and a Park and ride facility.
