= Daria Snigur =

Ukrainian tennis player (born 2002)

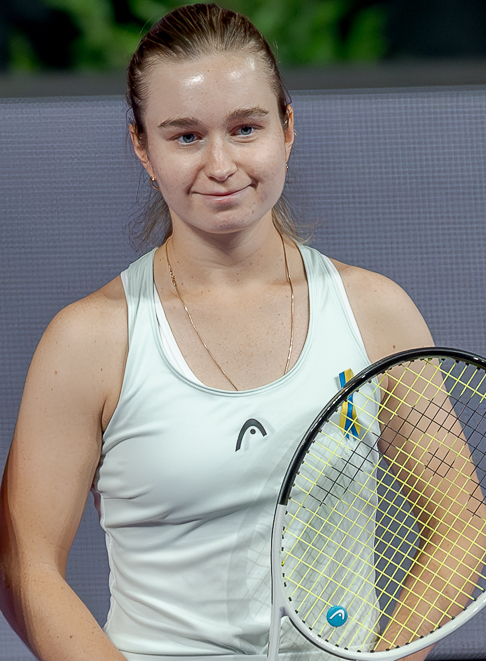
- Snigur at the 2025 Transylvania Open
- Full name: Daria Serhiyivna Snigur
- Native name: Дарія Сергіївна Снігур
- Country (sports): Ukraine
- Residence: Warsaw, Poland
- Born: 27 March 2002 (age 24) Kyiv, Ukraine
- Height: 1.73 m (5 ft 8 in)
- Plays: Right-handed (two-handed backhand)
- Coach: Dawid Celt
- Prize money: US$ 1,856,827

Singles
- Career record: 292–152
- Career titles: 1 WTA 125
- Highest ranking: No. 40 (19 October 2026)
- Current ranking: No. 40 (19 October 2026)

Grand Slam singles results
- Australian Open: 1R (2024, 2025)
- French Open: 2R (2026)
- Wimbledon: 3R (2026)
- US Open: 2R (2022)

Doubles
- Career record: 0–2
- Highest ranking: No. 1,620 (14 September 2026)

Grand Slam doubles results
- US Open: 1R (2026)
- Last updated on: 3 October 2026.

Daria Serhiyivna Snigur (Ukrainian: Дарія Сергіївна Снігур; born 27 March 2002) is a Ukrainian professional tennis player. She has a career-high ranking by the WTA of No. 40, achieved on 19 October 2026. Snigur has won 12 singles titles at tournaments of the ITF Women's Circuit.

== Career ==
=== Juniors ===
On the ITF Junior Circuit, Snigur reached a career-high ranking of No. 2, achieved on 28 October 2019, after reaching the final of the ITF Junior Finals.

On 12 July 2019, Snigur became the second Ukrainian junior champion at Wimbledon after Kateryna Volodko. She defeated Alexa Noel in straight sets.

=== 2022: Professional debut & first top 10 win ===
Snigur made her WTA Tour debut on grass courts at the Nottingham Open as a qualifier, losing to sixth seed Alison Riske in the first round. She also made her Grand Slam tournament main-draw debut as a qualifier at the US Open. In the first round, she defeated Simona Halep. It was Snigur's first top-10 and career win at a major event. In the second round, Snigur lost to Rebecca Marino in straight sets.

=== 2023: WTA Tour quarterfinal ===
At the Nottingham Open, she entered as a lucky loser and defeated Beatriz Haddad Maia in the first round, and then lost to Katie Boulter.

At the Transylvania Open, she reached the quarterfinals with wins over Greet Minnen and Anna-Lena Friedsam.

=== 2024–2026: Australian Open, Wimbledon and top 50 debuts, first WTA Tour final ===
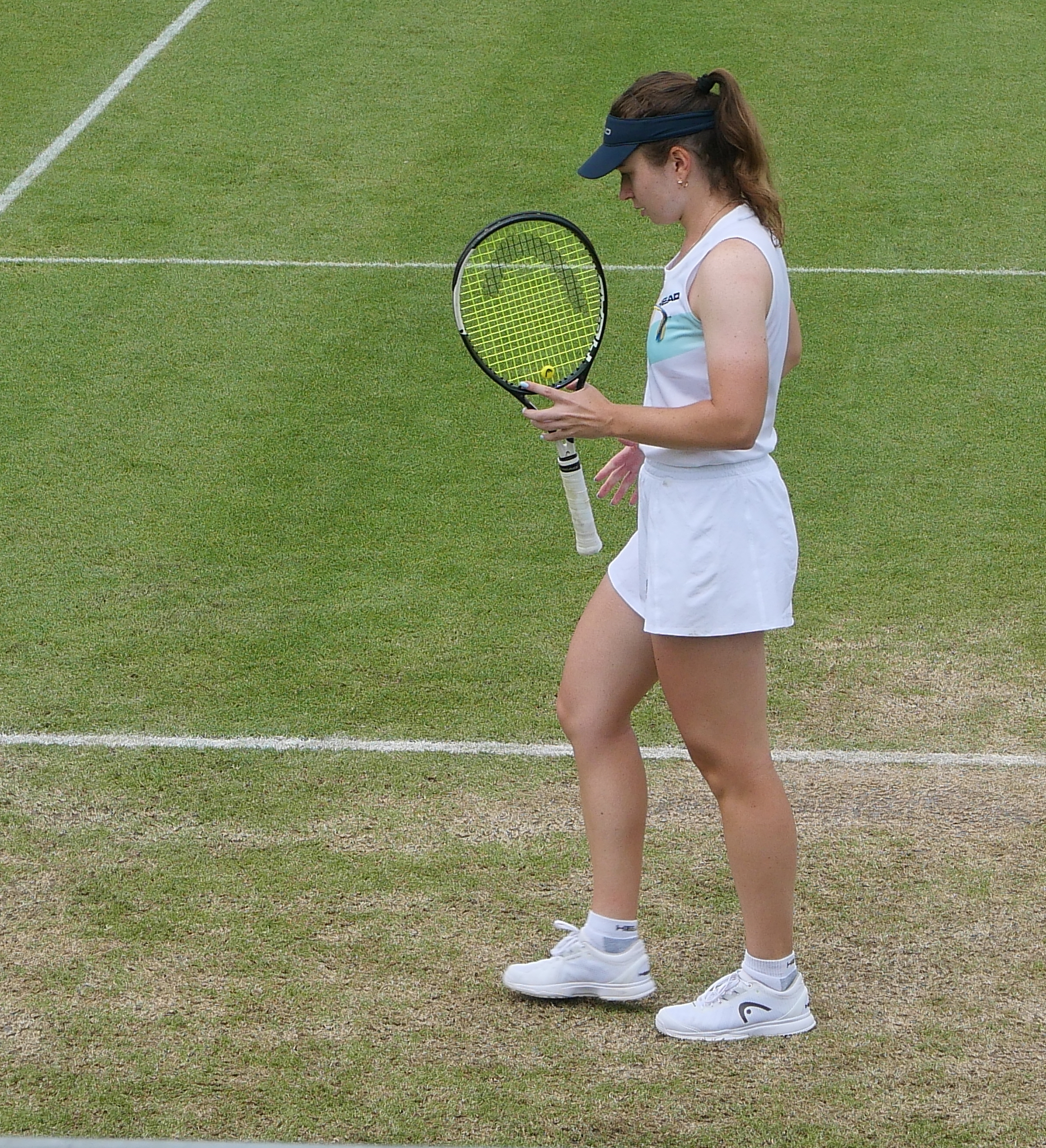
Snigur at the 2026 Rosmalen Open

Snigur made her debut at the Australian Open after qualifying and lost to Alycia Parks in the first round in three sets.

At the 2024 Nottingham Open, she recorded her first top-20 win of the season by defeating Marta Kostyuk. She lost her next match to Emma Raducanu. Snigur qualified for the 2024 Wimbledon, making her debut at this major; she defeated Océane Dodin in the first round before losing to Jelena Ostapenko in the next round.

After reaching her first WTA Tour semifinal at the 2026 Transylvania Open in Cluj-Napoca and winning her first WTA 125 title in Oeiras, she entered the top 100 in the singles rankings at world No. 93, on 30 March 2026. Snigur reached her first WTA Tour final at the Prague Open in July 2026, which she lost to Lilli Tagger in straight sets. This result lead to Snigur entering the top 50 in the singles rankings for the first time in her career.

== Performance timelines ==
Key
W	F	SF	QF	#R	RR	Q#	P#	DNQ	A	Z#	PO	G	S	B	NMS	NTI	P	NH

(W) winner; (F) finalist; (SF) semifinalist; (QF) quarterfinalist; (#R) rounds 4, 3, 2, 1; (RR) round-robin stage; (Q#) qualification round; (P#) preliminary round; (DNQ) did not qualify; (A) absent; (Z#) Davis/Fed Cup Zonal Group (with number indication) or (PO) play-off; (G) gold, (S) silver or (B) bronze Olympic/Paralympic medal; (NMS) not a Masters tournament; (NTI) not a Tier I tournament; (P) postponed; (NH) not held; (SR) strike rate (events won / competed); (W–L) win–loss record.
To avoid confusion and double counting, these charts are updated at the conclusion of a tournament or when the player's participation has ended.

Only main-draw results in WTA Tour, Grand Slam tournaments, Fed Cup/Billie Jean King Cup and Olympic Games are included in win–loss records.

=== Singles ===
Current through the 2026 Wimbledon Championships.

Tournament	2020	2021	2022	2023	2024	2025	2026	SR	W–L	Win %
Grand Slam tournaments
Australian Open	A	Q1	Q2	Q2	1R	1R	Q3	0 / 2	0–2	
French Open	Q1	Q1	Q1	Q1	Q2	Q2	2R	0 / 1	1–1	
Wimbledon	NH	Q1	Q2	Q1	2R	Q2	3R	0 / 2	3–2	
US Open	A	Q1	2R	Q1	Q2	Q1	1R	0 / 2	1–2	
Win–loss	0–0	0–0	1–1	0–0	1–2	0–1	3–3	0 / 7	5–7	
WTA 1000 tournaments
Qatar Open	A	NTI	A	NTI	A	A	A	0 / 0	0–0	
Dubai Championships	NTI	A	NTI	A	A	A	A	0 / 0	0–0	
Indian Wells Open	A	A	A	A	Q1	Q1	A	0 / 0	0–0	
Miami Open	A	A	Q1	A	A	A	A	0 / 0	0–0	
Madrid Open	A	A	A	A	A	Q1	2R	0 / 1	1–1	
Italian Open	A	A	A	A	A	A	Q2	0 / 0	0–0	
Canadian Open	A	A	A	A	A	A	A	0 / 0	0–0	
Cincinnati Open	A	A	A	A	A	A	2R	0 / 1	1–1	
China Open	Not Held			A	A	A		0 / 0	0–0	
Wuhan Open	Not Held				A	A		0 / 0	0–0	
Career statistics
	2020	2021	2022	2023	2024	2025	2026	SR	W–L	Win%
Tournaments	0	0	3	3	3	2	3	Career total: 3		
Titles	0	0	0	0	0	0	0	Career total: 0		
Finals	0	0	0	0	0	0	0	Career total: 0		
Hard win–loss	0–0	0–0	1–2	2–2	0–1	0–2	4–2	0 / 9	7–9	
Clay win–loss	0–0	0–0	0–0	0–0	0–0	0–0	1–1	0 / 1	1–1	
Grass win–loss	0–0	0–0	0–1	1–1	2–2	0–0	2–1	0 / 5	5–5	
Overall win–loss	0–0	0–0	1–3	3–3	2–3	0–2	7–4	0 / 15	13–15	
Year-end ranking	218	183	106	121	141	158		$1,856,827		

== WTA Tour finals ==
=== Singles: 1 (runner-up) ===
Legend WTA 250 (0–1)	Finals by surface Hard (0–1)	Finals by setting Outdoor (0–1)

Result	Date	Tournament	Tier	Surface	Opponent	Score
Loss	Jul 2026	Prague Open, Czech Republic	WTA 250	Hard	(Austria) Lilli Tagger	6–7^{(3–7)}, 2–6

== WTA 125 finals ==
=== Singles: 1 (title) ===
Result	Date	Tournament	Surface	Opponents	Score
Win	Feb 2026	Oeiras Indoors, Portugal	Hard (i)	(Switzerland) Viktorija Golubic	6–3, 6–3

== ITF Circuit finals ==
=== Singles: 21 (12 titles, 9 runner-ups) ===
Legend W100 tournaments (2–1) W60/75 tournaments (3–5) W40/50 tournaments (2–1) W25 tournaments (3–2) W15 tournaments (2–0)	Finals by surface Hard (12–6) Carpet (0–3)

Result	W–L	Date	Tournament	Tier	Surface	Opponent	Score
Win	1–0	Nov 2018	ITF Antalya, Turkey	15,000	Hard	(Turkey) Zeynep Sönmez	3–6, 7–6^{(3)}, 6–3
DNP	—N/a	Dec 2018	ITF Antalya, Turkey	15,000	Hard	(Finland) Oona Orpana	canc.
Win	2–0	Mar 2019	ITF Sharm El Sheikh, Egypt	W15	Hard	(Finland) Oona Orpana	3–6, 6–3, 6–4
Win	3–0	Apr 2019	ITF Kashiwa, Japan	W25	Hard	(Canada) Rebecca Marino	6–4, 6–2
Win	4–0	Aug 2019	ITF Kiryat Shmona, Israel	W25	Hard	(United Kingdom) Maia Lumsden	6–1, 6–4
Loss	4–1	Dec 2019	Dubai Tennis Challenge, UAE	W100+H	Hard	(Romania) Ana Bogdan	1–6, 2–6
Win	5–1	Feb 2021	ITF Poitiers, France	W25	Hard (i)	(France) Clara Burel	6–3, 2–6, 7–5
Loss	5–2	Sep 2021	ITF Santarém, Portugal	W25	Hard	(Cyprus) Raluca Șerban	3–6, 4–6
Win	6–2	Nov 2021	Dubai Tennis Challenge, UAE	W100+H	Hard	(Slovakia) Kristína Kučová	6–3, 6–0
Loss	6–3	Feb 2022	AK Ladies Open, Germany	W60	Carpet (i)	(Belgium) Greet Minnen	4–6, 3–6
Loss	6–4	Nov 2022	ITF Pétange, Luxembourg	W25	Hard (i)	(Germany) Mona Barthel	6–7^{(2)}, 2–6
Win	7–4	Jul 2023	Open Araba en Femenino, Spain	W100	Hard	(France) Jessika Ponchet	3–6, 6–4, 6–1
Win	8–4	Oct 2023	GB Pro-Series Glasgow, United Kingdom	W60	Hard (i)	(Germany) Mona Barthel	6–4, 6–4
Loss	8–5	Mar 2024	Říčany Open, Czech Republic	W75	Hard (i)	(Czech Republic) Tereza Valentová	7–6^{(4)}, 6–2
Win	9–5	Apr 2024	ITF Calvi, France	W50	Hard	(Switzerland) Valentina Ryser	6–3, 6–2
Win	10–5	May 2024	ITF Lopota, Georgia	W50	Hard	Kira Pavlova	6–1, 6–1
Loss	10–6	Nov 2024	Ismaning Open, Germany	W75	Carpet (i)	(Switzerland) Susan Bandecchi	7–6^{(8)}, 2–6, 5–7
Loss	10–7	Feb 2025	AK Ladies Open, Germany	W75	Carpet (i)	(Russia) Julia Avdeeva	3–6, 3–6
Loss	10–8	Apr 2025	ITF Yecla, Spain	W50	Hard	(France) Harmony Tan	6–3, 3–6, 1–6
Win	11–8	Oct 2025	GB Pro-Series Glasgow, UK	W75	Hard (i)	(Switzerland) Susan Bandecchi	6–4, 6–3
Loss	11–9	Mar 2026	Trnava Indoor, Slovakia	W75	Hard (i)	(Belgium) Hanne Vandewinkel	6–7^{(1)}, 1–6
Win	12–9	Mar 2026	ITF Murska Sobota, Slovenia	W75	Hard (i)	(Belgium) Greet Minnen	6–3, 6–2

== Junior Grand Slam tournament finals ==
=== Singles: 1 (title) ===
Result	Year	Tournament	Surface	Opponent	Score
Win	2019	Wimbledon	Grass	(United States) Alexa Noel	6–4, 6–4

== Wins against top 10 players ==
- Snigur has a 3–2 record against players who were, at the time the match was played, ranked in the top 10.

No.	Player	Rk	Event	Surface	Rd	Score	Rk	Years	Ref
1	(Romania) Simona Halep	7	US Open, United States	Hard	1R	6–2, 0–6, 6–4	124	2022	
2	(Brazil) Beatriz Haddad Maia	10	Nottingham Open, UK	Grass	1R	6–4, 6–3	157	2023	
3	(Ukraine) Elina Svitolina	8	Wimbledon, United Kingdom	Grass	1R	7–5, 6–2	77	2026	

- Key: (Rk) first use, opponent rank; (Rd) round; (Rk) 2nd use, player rank; (Ref) reference; (F) final; (SF) semifinal; (QF) quarterfinal; (#R) rounds 4, 3, 2, 1; (RR) round-robin stage; (Q#) qualifying rounds or stages (3), 2, 1.

* statistics correct as of 10 December 2019.
