= Carolina Kuhl =

German tennis player

- Country (sports): Germany
- Born: 4 April 2005 (age 21)
- Plays: Left-handed (two-handed backhand)
- Prize money: US $72,347

Singles
- Career record: 113–99
- Career titles: 3 ITF
- Highest ranking: No. 391 (11 November 2024)
- Current ranking: No. 593 (16 November 2026)

Doubles
- Career record: 43–44
- Career titles: 1 ITF
- Highest ranking: No. 599 (18 August 2025)
- Current ranking: No. 611 (16 November 2026)
- Last updated on: 17 November 2026.

Carolina Kuhl (born 4 April 2005) is a German tennis player. She has a career-high WTA singles ranking of world No. 391, achieved on 11 November 2024, and a best doubles ranking of No. 599, attained on 18 August 2025.

== Career ==
In 2017, Kuhl won the Bavarian championship title in the U14 age group at the age of twelve, and two years later she also became Bavarian champion in the U16 age group. She won six singles and three doubles titles on the ITF Junior Tour and achieved her highest junior world ranking of 31st on January 31, 2022.

Kuhl has been part of the Porsche Junior Team since 2021 and has also been playing tournaments on the ITF Women's World Tennis Tour since the same year.

In 2022, she reached the quarter-finals of the girls' singles at the Australian Open. In April, she won her first ITF doubles title together with Ilinca Amariei. In September, she and her partner Ella Seidel reached the final of the girls' doubles at the 2022 US Open, which they lost 3-6 and 2–6 to Lucie Havlíčková and Diana Schneider.

In 2023, Kuhl celebrated her first ITF singles title in May when she won the tournament in Pörtschach am Wörther See. At the beginning of June, she won her second singles tournament in Troisdorf, and in the same month she won her third tournament in a row in Gdańsk, Poland.

== ITF Circuit finals ==
=== Singles: 7 (3 titles, 4 runner-ups) ===
Legend W25/W35 tournaments (1–1) W15 tournaments (2–3)	Finals by surface Hard (0–2) Clay (3–2)

Result	W–L	Date	Tournament	Tier	Surface	Opponent	Score
Loss	0–1	Aug 2022	ITF Kottingbrunn, Austria	W15	Clay	(Hungary) Amarissa Kiara Tóth	3–6, 5–7
Win	1–1	May 2023	ITF Pörtschach, Austria	W15	Clay	(Belgium) Lara Salden	6–1, 1–6, 6–4
Win	2–1	Jun 2023	ITF Troisdorf, Germany	W25	Clay	Julia Avdeeva	3–6, 6–4, 6–4
Win	3–1	Jun 2023	ITF Gdańsk, Poland	W15	Clay	(Poland) Gina Feistel	2–6, 6–2, 7–6^{(7–5)}
Loss	3–2	Jan 2024	ITF Esch-sur-Alzette, Luxembourg	W15	Hard (i)	(Ukraine) Veronika Podrez	4–6, 3–6
Loss	3–3	Mar 2024	ITF Monastir, Tunisia	W15	Hard	(Germany) Mara Guth	2–6, 3–3 ret.
Loss	3–4	Jul 2025	ITF Mohammedia, Morocco	W35	Clay	(Morocco) Yasmine Kabbaj	3–6, 3–6

=== Doubles: 4 (1 title, 3 runner-ups) ===
Legend W50 tournaments (0–1) W15 tournaments (1–2)	Finals by surface Hard (0–1) Clay (1–2)

Result	W–L	Date	Tournament	Tier	Surface	Partner	Opponents	Score
Loss	0–1	Aug 2021	ITF Erwitte, Germany	W15	Clay	(Germany) Angelina Wirges	(Germany) Katharina Hering (Germany) Natalia Siedliska	1–6, 5–7
Win	1–1	Apr 2022	ITF Cairo, Egypt	W15	Clay	(Romania) Ilinca Amariei	(Italy) Diletta Cherubini (Germany) Emily Welker	6–2, 2–6, [10–3]
Loss	1–2	Jun 2024	ITF Madrid, Spain	W15	Clay	(Italy) Diletta Cherubini	(Colombia) María Herazo González (Italy) Francesca Pace	3–6, 5–7
Loss	1–3	Dec 2024	ITF Sëlva, Italy	W50	Hard (i)	(Serbia) Mia Ristić	(Poland) Martyna Kubka (Sweden) Lisa Zaar	3–6, 0–6

== Junior Grand Slam tournament finals ==
=== Doubles: 1 (runner-up) ===
Result	Year	Tournament	Surface	Partner	Opponents	Score
Loss	2022	US Open	Hard	(Germany) Ella Seidel	(Czech Republic) Lucie Havlíčková; Diana Shnaider	3–6, 2–6
