= Susan Bandecchi =

Swiss tennis player (born 1998)

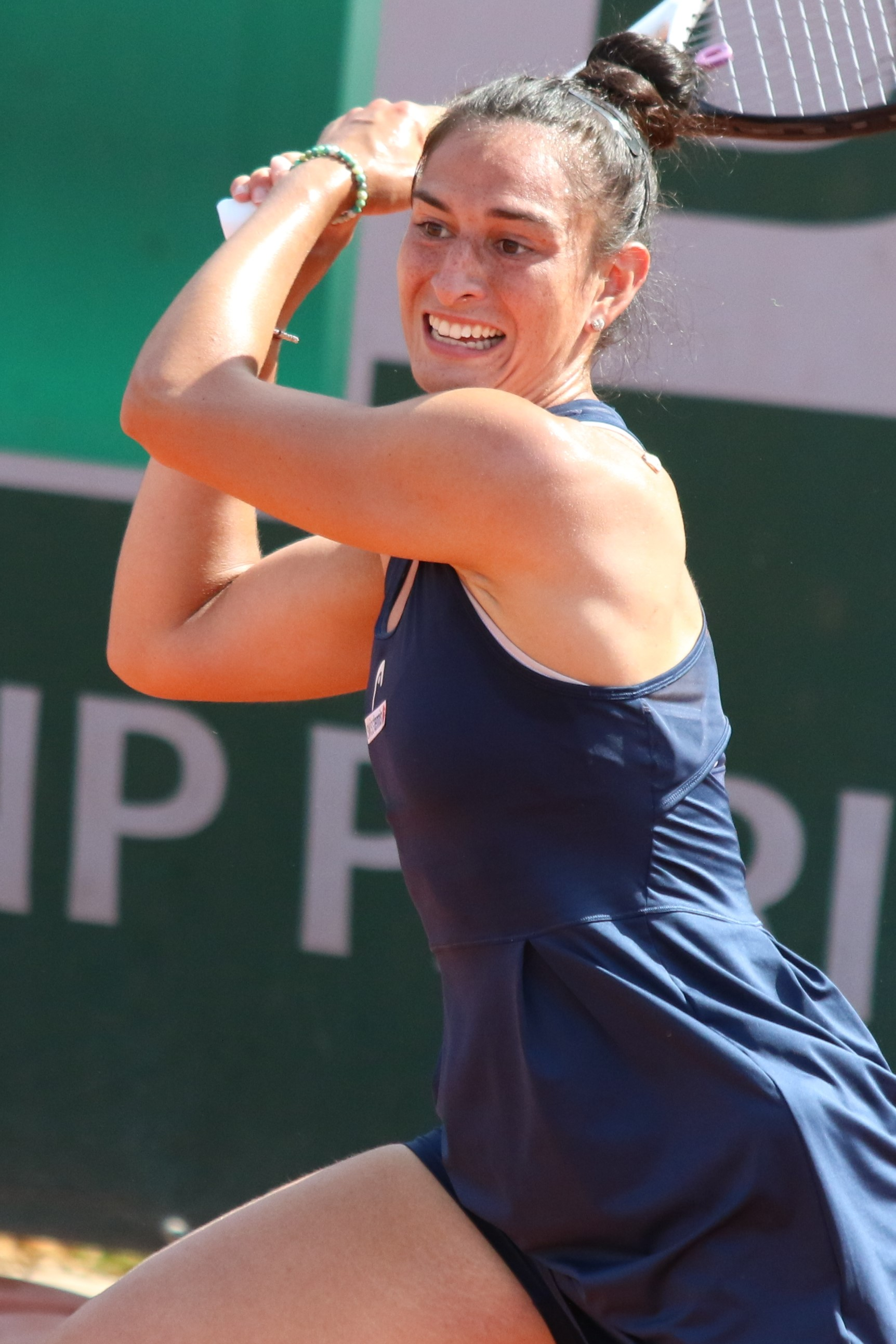
- Bandecchi at the 2022 French Open
- Country (sports): Switzerland
- Born: 1 July 1998 (age 28) Lugano, Switzerland
- Plays: Right (two-handed backhand)
- Prize money: US$ 456,177

Singles
- Career record: 320–232
- Career titles: 0; 7 ITF
- Highest ranking: No. 137 (12 October 2026)
- Current ranking: No. 137 (12 October 2026)

Grand Slam singles results
- Australian Open: Q1 (2022, 2025)
- French Open: 2R (2026)
- Wimbledon: Q1 (2021, 2022, 2023, 2025, 2026)
- US Open: Q3 (2026)

Doubles
- Career record: 50–59
- Career titles: 1
- Highest ranking: No. 141 (11 July 2022)
- Current ranking: No. 521 (20 July 2026)
- Last updated on: 20 July 2026.

Susan Bandecchi (born 1 July 1998) is a Swiss professional tennis player. She reached a career-high WTA singles ranking of No. 137 on 12 October 2026 and her best doubles ranking of No. 141 on 11 July 2022.

== Career ==
=== 2013–2017: Professional debut ===
Bandecchi, born in Lugano, started playing tennis at the age of five. Since 2013, she has played on the professional tour, mainly at ITF Circuit tournaments. In 2017, she won her first ITF doubles tournament in Caslano, Switzerland, partnering her compatriot Lisa Sabino.

=== 2019–2020: WTA Tour debut ===
In November 2019, Bandecchi made her WTA Tour debut at the Taipei tournament, where she participated in both singles and doubles.

In 2020, Bandecchi won the ITF Circuit tournament in Lousada, Portugal, in singles, beating Dutch player Arianne Hartono in the final. Together with Lara Salden from Belgium, she also won the doubles title in Lousada.

=== 2021: First WTA Tour title in doubles ===
She won her first doubles title at the Ladies Open Lausanne, partnered with Simona Waltert.

=== 2026: Grand slam debut ===
In May 2026, Bandecchi qualified for the French Open for her Grand Slam main-draw debut, following wins in the qualifying rounds against Dominika Salkova, Chloé Paquet and Viktoria Hruncakova. In the first round of the main draw, Bandecchi defeated the 31st seed Cristina Bucsa of Spain in three sets. She lost to Daria Kasatkina in the second round.

== Performance timeline ==
Key
W	F	SF	QF	#R	RR	Q#	P#	DNQ	A	Z#	PO	G	S	B	NMS	NTI	P	NH

(W) winner; (F) finalist; (SF) semifinalist; (QF) quarterfinalist; (#R) rounds 4, 3, 2, 1; (RR) round-robin stage; (Q#) qualification round; (P#) preliminary round; (DNQ) did not qualify; (A) absent; (Z#) Davis/Fed Cup Zonal Group (with number indication) or (PO) play-off; (G) gold, (S) silver or (B) bronze Olympic/Paralympic medal; (NMS) not a Masters tournament; (NTI) not a Tier I tournament; (P) postponed; (NH) not held; (SR) strike rate (events won / competed); (W–L) win–loss record.
To avoid confusion and double counting, these charts are updated at the conclusion of a tournament or when the player's participation has ended.

Only main-draw results in WTA Tour, Grand Slam tournaments, Billie Jean King Cup and Olympic Games are included in win–loss records.

=== Singles ===
Current through the 2023 Rosmalen Open.

Tournament	2021	2022	2023	2024	2025	2026	W–L
Grand Slam tournaments
Australian Open	A	Q1	A				0–0
French Open	Q3	Q2	Q1			2R	0–0
Wimbledon	Q1	Q1	Q1				0–0
US Open	Q2	A					0–0
Win–loss	0–0	0–0	0–0				0–0
WTA 1000
Italian Open	A	Q2	A				0–0
Career statistics
Tournaments	1	1	1				Career total: 3
Overall win-loss	0–1	1–1	0–1				1–3

== WTA Tour finals ==
=== Doubles: 1 (title) ===
Legend Grand Slam (–) WTA 1000 (–) WTA 500 (–) WTA 250 (1–0)	Finals by surface Hard (–) Clay (1–0) Grass (–)	Finals by setting Outdoor (1–0) Indoor (–)

Result	W–L	Date	Tournament	Tier	Surface	Partner	Opponents	Score
Win	1–0	Jul 2021	Ladies Open Lausanne, Switzerland	WTA 250	Clay	(Switzerland) Simona Waltert	(Norway) Ulrikke Eikeri (Greece) Valentini Grammatikopoulou	6–3, 6–7^{(3)}, [10–5]

== ITF Circuit finals ==
=== Singles: 16 (8 titles, 8 runner-ups) ===
Legend
W60/75 tournaments
W50 tournaments
W25/35 tournaments
W15 tournaments

Result	W–L	Date	Tournament	Tier	Surface	Opponent	Score
Win	1–0	Sep 2017	ITF Sion, Switzerland	W15	Clay	(Switzerland) Kristina Milenkovic	6–2, 6–3
Loss	1–1	Dec 2017	ITF Jablonec Nad Nisou, Czech Republic	W15	Carpet (i)	(Czech Republic) Miriam Kolodziejová	3–6, 4–6
Win	2–1	Jun 2019	ITF Akko, Israel	W25	Hard	(Israel) Julia Glushko	6–4, 6–2
Loss	2–2	Sep 2019	ITF Trieste, Italy	W25	Clay	(Italy) Elisabetta Cocciaretto	3–6, 1–6
Win	3–2	Nov 2020	ITF Lousada, Portugal	W15	Hard (i)	(Netherlands) Arianne Hartono	7–6^{(6)}, 2–6, 6–2
Loss	3–3	Nov 2020	ITF Lousada, Portugal	W15	Hard (i)	(Belgium) Lara Salden	4–6, 3–6
Loss	3–4	Apr 2021	ITF Calvi, France	W25+H	Hard	(Russia) Valeria Savinykh	1–6, 4–6
Loss	3–5	May 2021	ITF Salinas, Ecuador	W25	Hard	(Italy) Lucrezia Stefanini	1–6, 3–6
Win	4–5	Nov 2021	ITF Ortisei, Italy	W25	Hard (i)	(India) Karman Thandi	6–4, 6–4
Loss	4–6	Jun 2024	ITF Troisdorf, Germany	W50	Clay	(Turkey) Berfu Cengiz	1–6, 6–2, 3–6
Win	5–6	Sep 2024	ITF Baza, Spain	W35	Hard	(Spain) Ariana Geerlings	6–3, 6–3
Win	6–6	Oct 2024	GB Pro-Series Loughborough, United Kingdom	W35	Hard (i)	(United Kingdom) Ranah Stoiber	6–4, 3–6, 6–1
Win	7–6	Nov 2024	Ismaning Open, Germany	W75	Carpet (i)	(Ukraine) Daria Snigur	6–7^{(8)}, 6–2, 7–5
Loss	7–7	Nov 2024	ITF Lousada, Portugal	W35	Hard (i)	(Belgium) Hanne Vandewinkel	4–6, 2–6
Loss	7–8	Oct 2025	GB Pro-Series Glasgow, United Kingdom	W75	Hard (i)	(Ukraine) Daria Snigur	4–6, 3–6
Win	8–8	Aug 2026	ITF Aldershot, United Kingdom	W35	Hard	(United States) Alana Smith	7–5, 6–0

=== Doubles: 6 (2 titles, 4 runner-ups) ===
Legend
W80 tournaments
W60 tournaments
W25 tournaments
W15 tournaments

Result	W–L	Date	Tournament	Tier	Surface	Partner	Opponents	Score
Win	1–0	Aug 2017	ITF Caslano, Switzerland	W15	Clay	(Switzerland) Lisa Sabino	(Italy) Chiara Giaquinta (Italy) Maria Aurelia Scotti	6–1, 6–2
Loss	1–1	Oct 2019	ITF İstanbul, Turkey	W25	Hard (i)	(Poland) Katarzyna Piter	(Netherlands) Richèl Hogenkamp (Netherlands) Lesley Pattinama Kerkhove	2–6, 6–2, [6–10]
Win	2–1	Oct 2020	ITF Lousada, Portugal	W15	Hard (i)	(Belgium) Lara Salden	(Italy) Claudia Giovine (Italy) Angelica Moratelli	6–4, 6–3
Loss	2–2	Oct 2021	ITF Les Franqueses del Vallès, Spain	W80+H	Hard	(United Kingdom) Eden Silva	(Russia) Irina Khromacheva (Australia) Arina Rodionova	6–2, 3–6, [6–10]
Loss	2–3	Nov 2021	ITF Ortisei, Italy	W25	Hard (i)	(Switzerland) Ylena In-Albon	(Japan) Moyuka Uchijima (Hong Kong) Eudice Chong	2–6, 6–1, [5–10]
Loss	2–4	Feb 2022	AK Ladies Open, Germany	W60	Carpet (i)	(Switzerland) Simona Waltert	(Georgia (country)) Mariam Bolkvadze (United Kingdom) Samantha Murray Sharan	3–6, 5–7
