= Nastasja Schunk =

German tennis player (born 2003)

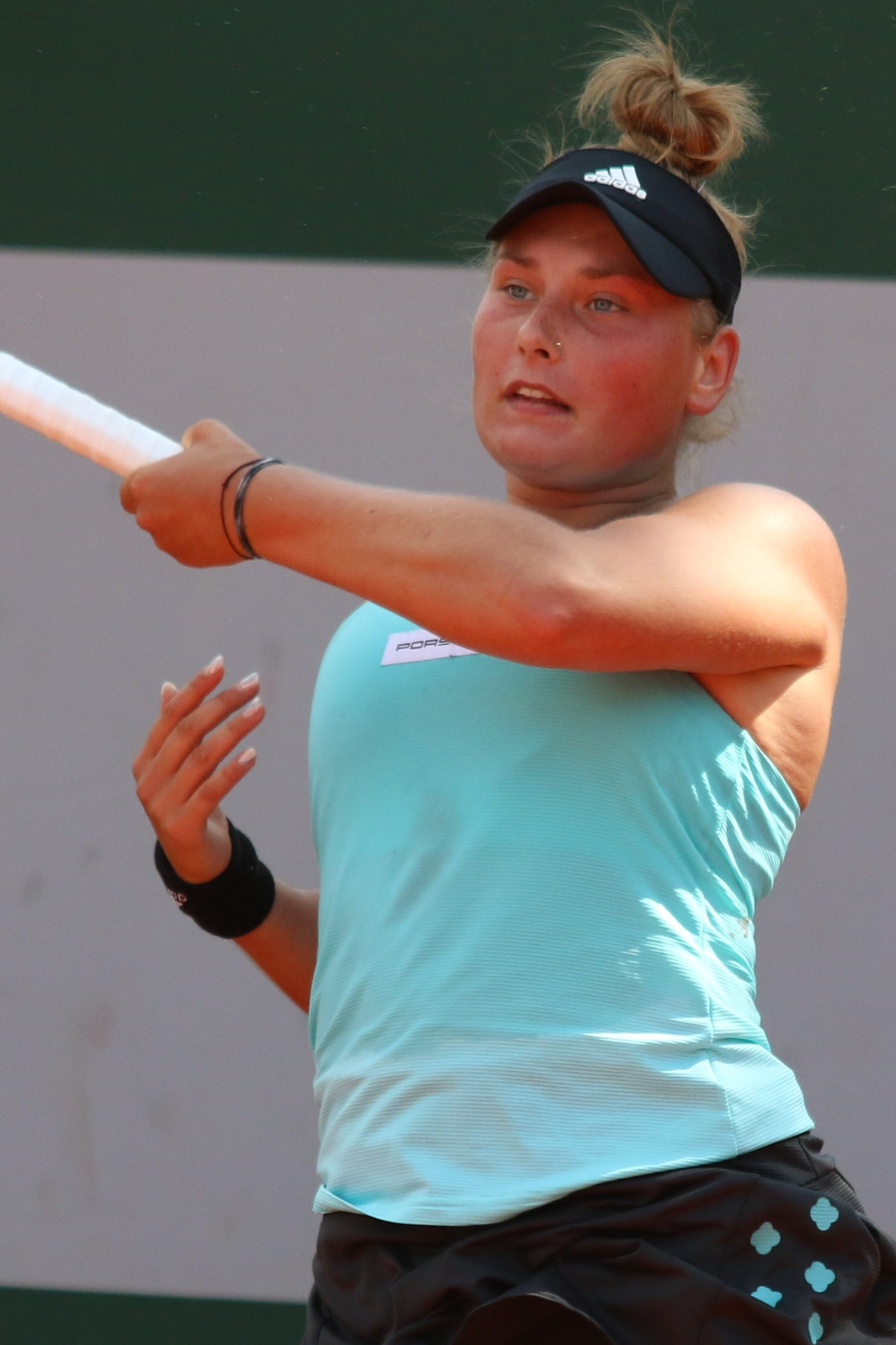
- Schunk at the 2022 French Open
- Full name: Nastasja Mariana Schunk
- Country (sports): Germany
- Born: 17 August 2003 (age 23) Mainz, Germany
- Height: 1.71 m (5 ft 7 in)
- Plays: Left-handed (two-handed backhand)
- Prize money: $434,854

Singles
- Career record: 180–118
- Career titles: 5 ITF
- Highest ranking: No. 143 (22 August 2022)
- Current ranking: No. 263 (2 November 2026)

Grand Slam singles results
- French Open: 1R (2022)
- Wimbledon: 1R (2022)
- US Open: Q2 (2022, 2024)

Doubles
- Career record: 24–25
- Career titles: 1 ITF
- Highest ranking: No. 314 (2 November 2026)
- Current ranking: No. 314 (2 November 2026)

Team competitions
- BJK Cup: RR (2021)
- Last updated on: 2 November 2026.

Nastasja Mariana Schunk (born 17 August 2003) is a German tennis player.

Schunk has a career-high WTA singles ranking of world No. 143, achieved on 8 August 2022 and a best doubles ranking of No. 314, attained on 2 November 2026.

== Juniors ==
On the ITF Junior Circuit, Schunk has a career-high combined ranking of world No. 55, achieved in January 2021. She reached her first junior Grand Slam final at the 2021 Wimbledon Championships as an unseeded player, in which she lost to Ane Mintegi del Olmo.

== Professional ==
=== 2021: WTA Tour debut ===
Schunk made her WTA Tour main-draw debut at the Stuttgart Open as a qualifier, but lost to Belinda Bencic in the first round.

=== 2022: Major debut ===
Schunk made her Grand Slam tournament debut at the French Open as a lucky loser after Ana Konjuh withdrew. She lost in the first round to 19th seed Simona Halep in three sets.

She qualified for her second major at Wimbledon, but again lost in the first round to a Romanian, this time to Mihaela Buzărnescu.

== Performance timelines ==
Key
W	F	SF	QF	#R	RR	Q#	DNQ	A	NH

(W) winner; (F) finalist; (SF) semifinalist; (QF) quarterfinalist; (#R) rounds 4, 3, 2, 1; (RR) round-robin stage; (Q#) qualification round; (DNQ) did not qualify; (A) absent; (NH) not held; (SR) strike rate (events won / competed); (W–L) win–loss record.
To avoid confusion and double counting, these charts are updated at the conclusion of a tournament or when the player's participation has ended.

Only main-draw results in WTA Tour, Grand Slam tournaments, Billie Jean King Cup (play-offs or higher) and Olympic Games are included in win–loss records.

=== Singles ===
Current through the 2026 WTA Tour.

Tournament	2021	2022	2023	2024	2025	2026	SR	W–L
Grand Slam tournaments
Australian Open	A	A	A	A	A	A	0 / 0	0–0
French Open	A	1R	A	Q1	A	A	0 / 1	0–1
Wimbledon	A	1R	A	A	A	A	0 / 1	0–1
US Open	A	Q2	A	Q2	A	A	0 / 0	0–0
Win–loss	0–0	0–2	0–0	0–0	0–0	0–0	0 / 2	0–2
WTA 1000 tournaments
Miami Open	A	1R	A	A	A	A	0 / 1	0–1
Career statistics
Tournaments	1	5	0	0	1	1	8	
Overall win–loss	0–1	0–5	0–0	0–0	1–1	0–1	1–8	
Year-end ranking	294	215	–	297	307	267		

=== Doubles ===
Current through the 2026 WTA Tour.

Tournament	2021	2022	2023	2024	2025	2026	SR	W–L
Grand Slam tournaments
Australian Open	A	A	A	A	A	A	0 / 0	0–0
French Open	A	A	A	A	A	A	0 / 0	0–0
Wimbledon	A	A	A	A	A	A	0 / 0	0–0
US Open	A	A	A	A	A	A	0 / 0	0–0
National representation
BJK Cup	RR	A	A	A	A	Z1	0 / 1	0–2
Career statistics
Tournaments	0	2	0	1	3	1	7	
Overall win–loss	0–1	1–2	0–0	1–1	0–3	1–1	3–8	
Year-end ranking	1322	500	–	462	1276	320		

== ITF Circuit finals ==
=== Singles: 12 (5 titles, 7 runner-ups) ===
Legend W100 tournaments (0–1) W75 tournaments (0–1) W50 tournaments (2–1) W25/35 tournaments (3–4)	Finals by surface Hard (1–4) Clay (4–3)

Result	W–L	Date	Tournament	Tier	Surface	Opponent	Score
Win	1–0	Aug 2021	ITF Bydgoszcz, Poland	W25	Clay	(Russia) Darya Astakhova	4–6, 6–2, 6–0
Win	2–0	Aug 2021	ITF Braunschweig, Germany	W25	Clay	(Germany) Anna Klasen	6–3, 6–1
Loss	2–1	Mar 2022	Open de Touraine, France	W25	Hard (i)	(Belgium) Magali Kempen	3–6, 4–6
Loss	2–2	May 2022	Wiesbaden Open, Germany	W100	Clay	(Montenegro) Danka Kovinić	3–6, 6–7^{(0–7)}
Loss	2–3	Aug 2024	ITF Roehampton, United Kingdom	W35	Hard	(United Kingdom) Sonay Kartal	5–7, 1–6
Loss	2–4	Jan 2025	Porto Indoor, Portugal	W75	Hard (i)	(Czech Republic) Tereza Valentová	3–6, 4–6
Loss	2–5	Apr 2025	ITF Santa Margherita di Pula, Italy	W35	Clay	(Italy) Nuria Brancaccio	7–6^{(7–2)}, 4–6, 1–6
Win	3–5	May 2025	ITF Villach, Austria	W35	Clay	(Greece) Sapfo Sakellaridi	0–6, 6–3, 2–4 ret.
Loss	3–6	May 2026	ITF Klagenfurt, Austria	W35	Clay	(Netherlands) Sarah van Emst	6–3, 5–7, 2–6
Win	4–6	Jul 2026	ITF Darmstadt, Germany	W50	Hard	(Spain) Irene Burillo	5–7, 6–0, 7–6^{(20–18)}
Win	5–6	Aug 2026	ITF Oldenzaal, Netherlands	W50	Clay	(Italy) Francesca Pace	7–5, 6–4
Loss	5–7	Nov 2026	ITF Istanbul, Turkey	W50	Hard (i)	Daria Egorova	4–6, 0–6

=== Doubles: 2 (1 title, 1 runner-up) ===
Legend W75 tournaments (0–1) W50 tournaments (1–0)	Finals by surface Hard (1–0) Carpet (0–1)

Result	W–L	Date	Tournament	Tier	Surface	Partner	Opponents	Score
Loss	0–1	Feb 2026	AK Ladies Open, Germany	W75	Carpet (i)	(Germany) Tessa Brockmann	(Poland) Martyna Kubka (Lithuania) Justina Mikulskytė	1–6, 2–6
Win	1–1	Oct 2026	ITF Cherbourg, France	W50	Hard (i)	(Germany) Valentina Steiner	(China) Feng Shuo (China) Li Zongyu	7–6^{(7–2)}, 6–4

== Junior Grand Slam tournament finals ==
=== Singles: 1 (runner-up) ===
Result	Year	Tournament	Surface	Opponent	Score
Loss	2021	Wimbledon	Grass	(Spain) Ane Mintegi del Olmo	6–2, 4–6, 1–6
