= 2021 Engie Open Andrézieux-Bouthéon 42 =

Tennis tournament

- Date: 25–31 January 2021
- Edition: 11th
- Category: ITF Women's World Tennis Tour
- Prize money: $60,000
- Surface: Hard / Indoor
- Location: Andrézieux-Bouthéon, France

Champions

Singles
- (France) Harmony Tan

Doubles
- (China) Lu Jiajing / (China) You Xiaodi
← 2020 ·	Open Andrézieux-Bouthéon 42	· 2022 →

The 2021 Engie Open Andrézieux-Bouthéon 42 was a professional women's tennis tournament played on indoor hard courts. It was the eleventh edition of the tournament which was part of the 2021 ITF Women's World Tennis Tour. It took place in Andrézieux-Bouthéon, France between 25 and 31 January 2021.

== Singles main-draw entrants ==
=== Seeds ===
Country	Player	Rank^{1}	Seed
FRA	Océane Dodin	107	1
GER	Anna-Lena Friedsam	111	2
SUI	Stefanie Vögele	116	3
UKR	Katarina Zavatska	119	4
CZE	Tereza Martincová	121	5
GER	Tamara Korpatsch	126	6
BUL	Viktoriya Tomova	139	7
DEN	Clara Tauson	152	8

- ^{1} Rankings are as of 18 January 2021.

=== Other entrants ===
The following players received wildcards into the singles main draw:

- (France) Amandine Hesse
- (France) Elsa Jacquemot
- (France) Diane Parry
- (France) Harmony Tan

The following player received entry using a junior exempt:

- (Andorra) Victoria Jiménez Kasintseva

The following player received entry using a protected ranking:

- (China) Lu Jiajing

The following players received entry from the qualifying draw:

- (Switzerland) Susan Bandecchi
- (France) Gaëlle Desperrier
- (Italy) Federica Di Sarra
- (France) Salma Djoubri
- (Latvia) Diāna Marcinkēviča
- (Slovakia) Rebecca Šramková
- (Poland) Urszula Radwańska
- (Liechtenstein) Kathinka von Deichmann

== Champions ==
=== Singles ===
- (France) Harmony Tan def. (Romania) Jaqueline Cristian, 3–6, 6–2, 6–1

=== Doubles ===
- (China) Lu Jiajing / (China) You Xiaodi def. (Poland) Paula Kania-Choduń / (Ukraine) Katarina Zavatska, 6–3, 6–4
