= 2020 Engie Open Andrézieux-Bouthéon 42 =

- Date: 27 January–2 February 2020
- Edition: 10th
- Category: ITF Women's World Tennis Tour
- Prize money: $60,000
- Surface: Hard / Indoor
- Location: Andrézieux-Bouthéon, France

Champions

Singles
- (Belgium) Ysaline Bonaventure

Doubles
- (Romania) Jaqueline Cristian / (Romania) Elena-Gabriela Ruse
← 2019 ·	Open Andrézieux-Bouthéon 42	· 2021 →

The 2020 Engie Open Andrézieux-Bouthéon 42 was a professional tennis tournament played on indoor hard courts. It was the tenth edition of the tournament which was part of the 2020 ITF Women's World Tennis Tour. It took place in Andrézieux-Bouthéon, France between 27 January and 2 February 2020.

== Singles main-draw entrants ==
=== Seeds ===
Country	Player	Rank^{1}	Seed
SRB	Nina Stojanović	85	1
NED	Arantxa Rus	93	2
RUS	Margarita Gasparyan	100	3
UKR	Katarina Zavatska	107	4
GER	Tamara Korpatsch	110	5
RUS	Natalia Vikhlyantseva	113	6
BEL	Ysaline Bonaventure	115	7
GER	Anna-Lena Friedsam	135	8

- ^{1} Rankings are as of 20 January 2020.

=== Other entrants ===
The following players received wildcards into the singles main draw:

- (France) Audrey Albié
- (France) Tessah Andrianjafitrimo
- (France) Myrtille Georges
- (France) Carole Monnet

The following players received entry into the singles main draw as special exempts:

- (Serbia) Dejana Radanović
- (France) Harmony Tan

The following players received entry from the qualifying draw:

- (France) Manon Arcangioli
- (Romania) Jaqueline Cristian
- (France) Gaëlle Desperrier
- (Luxembourg) Eléonora Molinaro
- (Switzerland) Conny Perrin
- (Cyprus) Raluca Șerban
- (Denmark) Clara Tauson
- (Germany) Anna Zaja

The following player received entry as a lucky loser:

- (Georgia (country)) Sofia Shapatava

== Champions ==
=== Singles ===
- (Belgium) Ysaline Bonaventure def. (Netherlands) Arantxa Rus, 6–4, 7–6^{(7–3)}

=== Doubles ===
- (Romania) Jaqueline Cristian / (Romania) Elena-Gabriela Ruse def. (Georgia (country)) Ekaterine Gorgodze / (Cyprus) Raluca Șerban, 7–6^{(8–6)}, 6–7^{(4–7)}, [10–8]
