= 2022 Engie Open Andrézieux-Bouthéon 42 =

Tennis tournament

- Date: 24–30 January 2022
- Edition: 12th
- Category: ITF Women's World Tennis Tour
- Prize money: $60,000
- Surface: Hard / Indoor
- Location: Andrézieux-Bouthéon, France

Champions

Singles
- (Romania) Ana Bogdan

Doubles
- (France) Estelle Cascino / (France) Jessika Ponchet
← 2021 ·	Open Andrézieux-Bouthéon 42	· 2023 →

The 2022 Engie Open Andrézieux-Bouthéon 42 was a professional tennis tournament played on indoor hard courts. It was the twelfth edition of the tournament which was part of the 2022 ITF Women's World Tennis Tour. It took place in Andrézieux-Bouthéon, France between 24 and 30 January 2022.

== Singles main-draw entrants ==
=== Seeds ===
Country	Player	Rank^{1}	Seed
FRA	Clara Burel	77	1
FRA	Océane Dodin	85	2
ROU	Ana Bogdan	116	3
GER	Anna-Lena Friedsam	138	4
SUI	Stefanie Vögele	145	5
RUS	Anna Blinkova	153	6
GBR	Katie Boulter	155	7
ESP	Rebeka Masarova	157	8

- ^{1} Rankings are as of 17 January 2022.

=== Other entrants ===
The following players received wildcards into the singles main draw:

- (France) Émeline Dartron
- (France) Salma Djoubri
- (France) Evita Ramirez
- (France) Margaux Rouvroy

The following players received entry from the qualifying draw:

- (Russia) Erika Andreeva
- (France) Manon Arcangioli
- (France) Clarisse Aussert
- (Turkey) Berfu Cengiz
- (Switzerland) Fiona Ganz
- (France) Léolia Jeanjean
- (France) Victoria Muntean
- (Cyprus) Raluca Șerban

== Champions ==
=== Singles ===
- (Romania) Ana Bogdan def. (Russia) Anna Blinkova, 7–5, 6–3

=== Doubles ===
- (France) Estelle Cascino / (France) Jessika Ponchet def. (United Kingdom) Alicia Barnett / (United Kingdom) Olivia Nicholls, 6–4, 6–1
