= 2020 Engie Open Andrézieux-Bouthéon 42 – Singles =

Singles
- 2020 Engie Open Andrézieux-Bouthéon 42

Final
- Champion: (Belgium) Ysaline Bonaventure
- Runner-up: (Netherlands) Arantxa Rus
- Score: 6–4, 7–6^{(7–3)}

Events
Singles	Doubles
← 2019 ·	Open Andrézieux-Bouthéon 42	· 2021 →

Rebecca Šramková was the defending champion but lost in the quarterfinals to Natalia Vikhlyantseva.

Ysaline Bonaventure won the title, defeating Arantxa Rus in the final, 6–4, 7–6^{(7–3)}.

== Seeds ==
1. (Serbia) Nina Stojanović (quarterfinals)
2. (Netherlands) Arantxa Rus (final)
3. (Russia) Margarita Gasparyan (second round, retired)
4. (Ukraine) Katarina Zavatska (second round)
5. (Germany) Tamara Korpatsch (first round)
6. (Russia) Natalia Vikhlyantseva (semifinals)
7. (Belgium) Ysaline Bonaventure (champion)
8. (Germany) Anna-Lena Friedsam (quarterfinals)

== Draw ==
=== Key ===
- Q = Qualifier
- WC = Wild card
- LL = Lucky loser
- Alt = Alternate
- SE = Special exempt
- PR = Protected ranking
- ITF = ITF entry
- JE = Junior exempt
- w/o = Walkover
- r = Retired
- d = Defaulted
- SR = Special ranking

=== Finals ===
Semifinals
(Belarus) Olga Govortsova	7^{9}	5	6^{4}
7	(Belgium) Ysaline Bonaventure	6^{7}	7	7^{7}
6	(Russia) Natalia Vikhlyantseva	4	5
2	(Netherlands) Arantxa Rus	6	7

Final
7	(Belgium) Ysaline Bonaventure	6	7^{7}
2	(Netherlands) Arantxa Rus	4	6^{3}

=== Top half ===
First round
1	(Serbia) N Stojanović	2	6	6
SE	(Serbia) D Radanović	6	3	4
(Netherlands) R Hogenkamp	6	6
Q	(Luxembourg) E Molinaro	4	4
(Bulgaria) I Shinikova	6^{5}	2
Q	(Romania) J Cristian	7^{7}	6
(Belarus) O Govortsova	6	6
5	(Germany) T Korpatsch	4	4
3	(Russia) M Gasparyan	6	6
(Netherlands) L Pattinama Kerkhove	4	2
LL	(Georgia (country)) S Shapatava	1	2
(Poland) M Fręch	6	6
Q	(France) G Desperrier	6	6
WC	(France) C Monnet	4	1
Q	(France) M Arcangioli	1	6	3
7	(Belgium) Y Bonaventure	6	0	6

Second round
1	(Serbia) N Stojanović	6	4	6
(Netherlands) R Hogenkamp	4	6	3
Q	(Romania) J Cristian	1	2
(Belarus) O Govortsova	6	6
3	(Russia) M Gasparyan	1^{r}
(Poland) M Fręch	3
Q	(France) G Desperrier	2	7^{8}	0
7	(Belgium) Y Bonaventure	6	6^{6}	6

Quarterfinals
1	(Serbia) N Stojanović	3	2
(Belarus) O Govortsova	6	6
(Poland) M Fręch	6	3	6^{5}
7	(Belgium) Y Bonaventure	2	6	7^{7}

Semifinals
(Belarus) O Govortsova	7^{9}	5	6^{4}
7	(Belgium) Y Bonaventure	6^{7}	7	7^{7}

=== Bottom half ===
First round
6	(Russia) N Vikhlyantseva	6	6
WC	(France) T Andrianjafitrimo	3	3
WC	(France) A Albié	6	6
Q	(Denmark) C Tauson	4	4
(Slovakia) R Šramková	6	6
(Spain) C Bucșa	3	3
WC	(France) M Georges	6^{5}	7^{7}	2
4	(Ukraine) K Zavatska	7^{7}	6^{4}	6
8	(Germany) A-L Friedsam	6	6
Q	(Switzerland) C Perrin	4	4
(France) O Dodin	2	6	6
SE	(France) H Tan	6	4	1
Q	(Cyprus) R Șerban	6	6
Q	(Germany) A Zaja	4	0
(Romania) E-G Ruse	6	1	1
2	(Netherlands) A Rus	4	6	6

Second round
6	(Russia) N Vikhlyantseva	2	6	6
WC	(France) A Albié	6	1	0
(Slovakia) R Šramková	6	6
4	(Ukraine) K Zavatska	1	4
8	(Germany) A-L Friedsam	6	6
(France) O Dodin	4	4
Q	(Cyprus) R Șerban	1	0
2	(Netherlands) A Rus	6	6

Quarterfinals
6	(Russia) N Vikhlyantseva	6	6
(Slovakia) R Šramková	4	2
8	(Germany) A-L Friedsam	3	4
2	(Netherlands) A Rus	6	6

Semifinals
6	(Russia) N Vikhlyantseva	4	5
2	(Netherlands) A Rus	6	7
