= 2022 Engie Open Andrézieux-Bouthéon 42 – Singles =

Singles
- 2022 Engie Open Andrézieux-Bouthéon 42

Final
- Champion: (Romania) Ana Bogdan
- Runner-up: (Russia) Anna Blinkova
- Score: 7–5, 6–3

Events
Singles	Doubles
← 2021 ·	Open Andrézieux-Bouthéon 42	· 2023 →

Harmony Tan was the defending champion but chose not to participate.

Ana Bogdan won the title, defeating Anna Blinkova in the final, 7–5, 6–3.

== Seeds ==
1. (France) Clara Burel (first round)
2. (France) Océane Dodin (quarterfinals)
3. (Romania) Ana Bogdan (champion)
4. (Germany) Anna-Lena Friedsam (second round)
5. (Switzerland) Stefanie Vögele (first round)
6. (Russia) Anna Blinkova (final)
7. (United Kingdom) Katie Boulter (first round)
8. (Spain) Rebeka Masarova (first round)

== Draw ==
=== Key ===
- Q = Qualifier
- WC = Wild card
- LL = Lucky loser
- Alt = Alternate
- SE = Special exempt
- PR = Protected ranking
- ITF = ITF entry
- JE = Junior exempt
- w/o = Walkover
- r = Retired
- d = Defaulted
- SR = Special ranking

=== Finals ===
Semifinals
(France) Jessika Ponchet	6	4	2
3	(Romania) Ana Bogdan	2	6	6
(Liechtenstein) Kathinka von Deichmann	4	2
6	(Russia) Anna Blinkova	6	6

Final
3	(Romania) Ana Bogdan	7	6
6	(Russia) Anna Blinkova	5	3

=== Top half ===
First round
1	(France) C Burel	6	4	2
(Switzerland) Y In-Albon	1	6	6
(Austria) J Grabher	6	6
WC	(France) É Dartron	2	0
(France) E Jacquemot	3	4
(France) J Ponchet	6	6
(Czech Republic) L Fruhvirtová	6	6
8	(Spain) R Masarova	0	1
3	(Romania) A Bogdan	6	6
Q	(France) L Jeanjean	3	3
Q	(Turkey) B Cengiz	6^{3}	3
Q	(Russia) E Andreeva	7^{7}	6
WC	(France) M Rouvroy	2	3
(Germany) T Korpatsch	6	6
WC	(France) S Djoubri	6	7
7	(United Kingdom) K Boulter	1	5

Second round
(Switzerland) Y In-Albon	7^{7}	2	6
(Austria) J Grabher	6^{2}	6	3
(France) J Ponchet	6	6
(Czech Republic) L Fruhvirtová	1	1
3	(Romania) A Bogdan	6	6
Q	(Russia) E Andreeva	2	2
(Germany) T Korpatsch	6^{1}	3
WC	(France) S Djoubri	7^{7}	6

Quarterfinals
(Switzerland) Y In-Albon	6^{5}	4
(France) J Ponchet	7^{7}	6
3	(Romania) A Bogdan	6	6
WC	(France) S Djoubri	3	3

Semifinals
(France) J Ponchet	6	4	2
3	(Romania) A Bogdan	2	6	6

=== Bottom half ===
First round
5	(Switzerland) S Vögele	4	6	5
(Liechtenstein) K von Deichmann	6	0	7
(Italy) L Stefanini	6	7
(Germany) S Wagner	1	5
WC	(France) E Ramirez	4	2
Q	(Cyprus) R Șerban	6	6
(France) A Hesse	2	3
4	(Germany) A-L Friedsam	6	6
6	(Russia) A Blinkova	6	6
Q	(France) C Aussert	2	3
(Poland) U Radwańska	3	6^{6}
(Slovakia) R Šramková	6	7^{8}
Q	(France) V Muntean	6	6
Q	(Switzerland) F Ganz	1	3
Q	(France) M Arcangioli	2	3
2	(France) O Dodin	6	6

Second round
(Liechtenstein) K von Deichmann	3	6	6
(Italy) L Stefanini	6	1	4
Q	(Cyprus) R Șerban	6^{2}	6	6
4	(Germany) A-L Friedsam	7^{7}	4	3
6	(Russia) A Blinkova	6	6
(Slovakia) R Šramková	4	4
Q	(France) V Muntean	3	3
2	(France) O Dodin	6	6

Quarterfinals
(Liechtenstein) K von Deichmann	6	7^{7}
Q	(Cyprus) R Șerban	3	6^{2}
6	(Russia) A Blinkova	6	6
2	(France) O Dodin	2	2

Semifinals
(Liechtenstein) K von Deichmann	4	2
6	(Russia) A Blinkova	6	6
