= 2021 Engie Open Andrézieux-Bouthéon 42 – Singles =

Singles
- 2021 Engie Open Andrézieux-Bouthéon 42

Final
- Champion: (France) Harmony Tan
- Runner-up: (Romania) Jaqueline Cristian
- Score: 3–6, 6–2, 6–1

Events
Singles	Doubles
← 2020 ·	Open Andrézieux-Bouthéon 42	· 2022 →

Ysaline Bonaventure was the defending champion, but chose not to participate.

Harmony Tan won the title, defeating Jaqueline Cristian in the final, 3–6, 6–2, 6–1.

== Seeds ==
1. (France) Océane Dodin (second round)
2. (Germany) Anna-Lena Friedsam (quarterfinals)
3. (Switzerland) Stefanie Vögele (second round)
4. (Ukraine) Katarina Zavatska (quarterfinals)
5. (Czech Republic) Tereza Martincová (second round)
6. (Germany) Tamara Korpatsch (first round)
7. (Bulgaria) Viktoriya Tomova (second round)
8. (Denmark) Clara Tauson (second round)

== Draw ==
=== Key ===
- Q = Qualifier
- WC = Wild card
- LL = Lucky loser
- Alt = Alternate
- SE = Special exempt
- PR = Protected ranking
- ITF = ITF entry
- JE = Junior exempt
- w/o = Walkover
- r = Retired
- d = Defaulted
- SR = Special ranking

=== Finals ===
Semifinals
Q	(Poland) Urszula Radwańska	3	1
(Romania) Jaqueline Cristian	6	6
WC	(France) Harmony Tan	6	6
Q	(Liechtenstein) Kathinka von Deichmann	1	0

Final
(Romania) Jaqueline Cristian	6	2	1
WC	(France) Harmony Tan	3	6	6

=== Top half ===
First round
1	(France) O Dodin	6	6
Q	(Switzerland) S Bandecchi	3	3
(Netherlands) L Pattinama Kerkhove	6^{3}	6	4
Q	(Poland) U Radwańska	7^{7}	2	6
Q	(France) S Djoubri	3	1
(Spain) C Bucșa	6	6
(Switzerland) L Küng	6	7
6	(Germany) T Korpatsch	2	5
3	(Switzerland) S Vögele	6	5	6
Q	(Latvia) D Marcinkēviča	4	7	2
(Romania) LI Paar	6	6
(Turkey) Ç Büyükakçay	3	4
(Romania) J Cristian	5	6	6
WC	(France) D Parry	7	4	2
WC	(France) E Jacquemot	4	6^{0}
8	(Denmark) C Tauson	6	7^{7}

Second round
1	(France) O Dodin	3	4
Q	(Poland) U Radwańska	6	6
(Spain) C Bucșa	1	4
(Switzerland) L Küng	6	6
3	(Switzerland) S Vögele	6^{6}	2
(Romania) LI Paar	7^{8}	6
(Romania) J Cristian	2	7^{7}	6
8	(Denmark) C Tauson	6	6^{4}	3

Quarterfinals
Q	(Poland) U Radwańska	6	6
(Switzerland) L Küng	4	1
(Romania) LI Paar	6	2	1
(Romania) J Cristian	1	6	6

Semifinals
Q	(Poland) U Radwańska	3	1
(Romania) J Cristian	6	6

=== Bottom half ===
First round
5	(Czech Republic) T Martincová	5	6	6
Q	(Italy) F Di Sarra	7	4	0
Q	(France) G Desperrier	3	1
WC	(France) H Tan	6	6
PR	(China) Jia Lu	6^{5}	4
JE	(Andorra) V Jiménez Kasintseva	7^{7}	6
(Italy) G Gatto-Monticone	4	1
4	(Ukraine) K Zavatska	6	6
7	(Bulgaria) V Tomova	6	6
WC	(France) A Hesse	3	2
Q	(Liechtenstein) K von Deichmann	6	6
(China) X You	4	4
(Italy) M Di Giuseppe	4	4
Q	(Slovakia) R Šramková	6	6
(Netherlands) I de Vroome	3	7	2
2	(Germany) A-L Friedsam	6	5	6

Second round
5	(Czech Republic) T Martincová	4	6^{7}
WC	(France) H Tan	6	7^{9}
JE	(Andorra) V Jiménez Kasintseva	1	6	2
4	(Ukraine) K Zavatska	6	3	6
7	(Bulgaria) V Tomova	0	4
Q	(Liechtenstein) K von Deichmann	6	6
Q	(Slovakia) R Šramková	3	1
2	(Germany) A-L Friedsam	6	6

Quarterfinals
WC	(France) H Tan	6	6
4	(Ukraine) K Zavatska	0	1
Q	(Liechtenstein) K von Deichmann	7	6
2	(Germany) A-L Friedsam	5	4

Semifinals
WC	(France) H Tan	6	6
Q	(Liechtenstein) K von Deichmann	1	0
