= 2020 Engie Open Andrézieux-Bouthéon 42 – Doubles =

Doubles
- 2020 Engie Open Andrézieux-Bouthéon 42

Final
- Champions: (Romania) Jaqueline Cristian (Romania) Elena-Gabriela Ruse
- Runners-up: (Georgia (country)) Ekaterine Gorgodze (Cyprus) Raluca Șerban
- Score: 7–6^{(8–6)}, 6–7^{(4–7)}, [10–8]

Events
Singles	Doubles
← 2019 ·	Open Andrézieux-Bouthéon 42	· 2021 →

Cornelia Lister and Renata Voráčová were the defending champions, but they chose not to participate.

Jaqueline Cristian and Elena-Gabriela Ruse won the title, defeating Ekaterine Gorgodze and Raluca Șerban in the final, 7–6^{(8–6)}, 6–7^{(4–7)}, [10–8].

== Seeds ==
1. (Russia) Yana Sizikova / (Serbia) Nina Stojanović (semifinals)
2. (Russia) Margarita Gasparyan / (Belarus) Olga Govortsova (withdrew)
3. (Georgia (country)) Sofia Shapatava / (United Kingdom) Emily Webley-Smith (first round)
4. (France) Estelle Cascino / (France) Elixane Lechemia (quarterfinals)

== Draw ==
=== Key ===
- Q = Qualifier
- WC = Wild card
- LL = Lucky loser
- Alt = Alternate
- SE = Special exempt
- PR = Protected ranking
- ITF = ITF entry
- JE = Junior exempt
- w/o = Walkover
- r = Retired
- d = Defaulted
- SR = Special ranking

=== Draw ===
First round
(France) M Georges (Belgium) K Zimmermann	6	6
(Spain) C Bucșa (France) V Muntean	0	3
3	(Georgia (country)) S Shapatava (United Kingdom) E Webley-Smith	4	2
(Romania) J Cristian (Romania) E-G Ruse	6	6
(Germany) T Morderger (Germany) Y Morderger	6	6^{5}	[6]
(United Kingdom) SB Grey (Switzerland) C Perrin	3	7^{7}	[10]
(Georgia (country)) E Gorgodze (Cyprus) R Șerban	6	6
(France) T Andrianjafitrimo (Ukraine) K Zavatska	4	1
(France) C Burel (France) D Parry
4	(France) E Cascino (France) E Lechemia	w/o
(Spain) M Bassols Ribera (Spain) N Párrizas Díaz	6	0	[10]
(France) M Arcangioli (Bulgaria) I Shinikova	4	6	[7]

Quarterfinals
1	(Russia) Y Sizikova (Serbia) N Stojanović	6	3	[10]
(France) M Georges (Belgium) K Zimmermann	4	6	[6]
(Romania) J Cristian (Romania) E-G Ruse	6	6
(United Kingdom) SB Grey (Switzerland) C Perrin	2	1
(Georgia (country)) E Gorgodze (Cyprus) R Șerban	6	6
4	(France) E Cascino (France) E Lechemia	3	0
(Spain) M Bassols Ribera (Spain) N Párrizas Díaz	w/o
2	(Russia) M Gasparyan (Belarus) O Govortsova

Semifinals
1	(Russia) Y Sizikova (Serbia) N Stojanović	1	6	[8]
(Romania) J Cristian (Romania) E-G Ruse	6	4	[10]
(Georgia (country)) E Gorgodze (Cyprus) R Șerban	6	6
(Spain) M Bassols Ribera (Spain) N Párrizas Díaz	4	0

Final
(Romania) J Cristian (Romania) E-G Ruse	7^{8}	6^{4}	[10]
(Georgia (country)) E Gorgodze (Cyprus) R Șerban	6^{6}	7^{7}	[8]
