= 2018 NEK Ladies Open – Doubles =

Doubles
- 2018 NEK Ladies Open

Final
- Champions: (Norway) Ulrikke Eikeri (Bulgaria) Elitsa Kostova
- Runners-up: (Hungary) Dalma Gálfi (Hungary) Réka Luca Jani
- Score: 2–6, 6–4, [10–8]

Events
Singles	Doubles
NEK Ladies Open	· 2019 →

This was the first edition of the tournament.

Ulrikke Eikeri and Elitsa Kostova won the title, defeating Dalma Gálfi and Réka Luca Jani in the final, 2–6, 6–4, [10–8].

== Seeds ==
1. (Slovakia) Chantal Škamlová / (Netherlands) Eva Wacanno (first round)
2. (Sweden) Cornelia Lister / (Belgium) An-Sophie Mestach (first round)
3. (Russia) Olga Doroshina / (Russia) Anastasiya Komardina (quarterfinals, retired)
4. (Czech Republic) Petra Krejsová / (Czech Republic) Jesika Malečková (semifinals)

== Draw ==
=== Key ===
- Q = Qualifier
- WC = Wild card
- LL = Lucky loser
- Alt = Alternate
- SE = Special exempt
- PR = Protected ranking
- ITF = ITF entry
- JE = Junior exempt
- w/o = Walkover
- r = Retired
- d = Defaulted
- SR = Special ranking

=== Draw ===
First round
1	(Slovakia) C Škamlová (Netherlands) E Wacanno	4	1
(Norway) U Eikeri (Bulgaria) E Kostova	6	6
(Italy) G Gatto-Monticone (Italy) A Grymalska	7^{7}	6
(Croatia) T Mrdeža (Montenegro) A Veselinović	6^{3}	2
3	(Russia) O Doroshina (Russia) A Komardina	6	7
(Netherlands) C Burger (Venezuela) A Gámiz	3	5
(Hungary) Á Bukta (Russia) E Yashina	4	6	[8]
(Bosnia and Herzegovina) D Herdželaš (Romania) OG Simion	6	1	[10]
WC	(Austria) J Trickovic (Austria) K Trickovic	1	1
(Romania) E Bogdan (Romania) A Cadanțu	6	6
(Hungary) A Bondár (Hungary) P Udvardy	2	6	[4]
4	(Czech Republic) P Krejsová (Czech Republic) J Malečková	6	3	[10]
WC	(Bulgaria) D Evtimova (Canada) P Januskova	6	7^{10}
WC	(Romania) N Dascălu (Bulgaria) A Naydenova	2	6^{8}
(Hungary) D Gálfi (Hungary) RL Jani	6	7
2	(Sweden) C Lister (Belgium) A-S Mestach	4	5

Quarterfinals
(Norway) U Eikeri (Bulgaria) E Kostova	6	7
(Italy) G Gatto-Monticone (Italy) A Grymalska	2	5
3	(Russia) O Doroshina (Russia) A Komardina	6	5^{r}
(Bosnia and Herzegovina) D Herdželaš (Romania) OG Simion	3	3
(Romania) E Bogdan (Romania) A Cadanțu	3	6^{2}
4	(Czech Republic) P Krejsová (Czech Republic) J Malečková	6	7^{7}
WC	(Bulgaria) D Evtimova (Canada) P Januskova	2	5
(Hungary) D Gálfi (Hungary) RL Jani	6	7

Semifinals
(Norway) U Eikeri (Bulgaria) E Kostova	7^{7}	1	[10]
(Bosnia and Herzegovina) D Herdželaš (Romania) OG Simion	6^{3}	6	[7]
4	(Czech Republic) P Krejsová (Czech Republic) J Malečková	7^{7}	2	[4]
(Hungary) D Gálfi (Hungary) RL Jani	6^{4}	6	[10]

Final
(Norway) U Eikeri (Bulgaria) E Kostova	2	6	[10]
(Hungary) D Gálfi (Hungary) RL Jani	6	4	[8]
