= 2018 NEK Ladies Open – Singles =

Tennis tournament

Singles
- 2018 NEK Ladies Open

Final
- Champion: (Poland) Iga Świątek
- Runner-up: (Ukraine) Katarina Zavatska
- Score: 6–2, 6–2

Events
Singles	Doubles
NEK Ladies Open	· 2019 →

This was the first edition of the tournament.

Iga Świątek won the title, defeating Katarina Zavatska in the final, 6–2, 6–2.

== Seeds ==
1. (Bulgaria) Viktoriya Tomova (quarterfinals)
2. (Bulgaria) Elitsa Kostova (first round)
3. (Germany) Tamara Korpatsch (semifinals)
4. (Spain) Sílvia Soler Espinosa (quarterfinals)
5. (Slovakia) Jana Čepelová (second round)
6. (Serbia) Ivana Jorović (quarterfinals)
7. (Ukraine) Katarina Zavatska (final)
8. (Croatia) Tereza Mrdeža (second round)

== Draw ==
=== Key ===
- Q = Qualifier
- WC = Wild card
- LL = Lucky loser
- Alt = Alternate
- SE = Special exempt
- PR = Protected ranking
- ITF = ITF entry
- JE = Junior exempt
- w/o = Walkover
- r = Retired
- d = Defaulted
- SR = Special ranking

=== Finals ===
Semifinals
7	(Ukraine) Katarina Zavatska	3	6	7^{7}
3	(Germany) Tamara Korpatsch	6	2	6^{2}
(Poland) Iga Świątek	6	6
(Austria) Barbara Haas	2	3

Final
7	(Ukraine) Katarina Zavatska	2	2
(Poland) Iga Świątek	6	6

=== Top half ===
First round
1	(Bulgaria) V Tomova	2	6	6
(Venezuela) A Gámiz	6	3	0
(Russia) M Melnikova	3	4
(Czech Republic) M Kilnarová	6	6
(Netherlands) C Burger	6^{4}	3
(Italy) G Gatto-Monticone	7^{7}	6
(Norway) U Eikeri	6	4	0
7	(Ukraine) K Zavatska	4	6	6
3	(Germany) T Korpatsch	6	3	6
(Slovakia) R Šramková	2	6	4
(Chile) D Seguel	6	7^{7}
LL	(Romania) N Dascălu	3	6^{5}
Q	(Poland) M Chwalińska	5	6	6
WC	(Hungary) D Gálfi	7	4	2
(Italy) A Grymalska	1	3
8	(Croatia) T Mrdeža	6	6

Second round
1	(Bulgaria) V Tomova	6	6
(Czech Republic) M Kilnarová	4	2
(Italy) G Gatto-Monticone	7	4	3
7	(Ukraine) K Zavatska	5	6	6
3	(Germany) T Korpatsch	6^{7}	6	6
(Chile) D Seguel	7^{9}	1	2
Q	(Poland) M Chwalińska	1	6	7
8	(Croatia) T Mrdeža	6	3	5

Quarterfinals
1	(Bulgaria) V Tomova	4	5
7	(Ukraine) K Zavatska	6	7
3	(Germany) T Korpatsch	6	2
Q	(Poland) M Chwalińska	3	0^{r}

Semifinals
7	(Ukraine) K Zavatska	3	6	7^{7}
3	(Germany) T Korpatsch	6	2	6^{2}

=== Bottom half ===
First round
5	(Slovakia) J Čepelová	6	6
(Spain) O Sáez Larra	3	4
(Poland) I Świątek	0	6	6
WC	(Hungary) RL Jani	6	2	1
(Romania) A Cadanțu	6	7
Q	(Slovenia) N Potočnik	0	5
WC	(Hungary) P Udvardy	4	1
4	(Spain) S Soler Espinosa	6	6
6	(Serbia) I Jorović	1	6	4
(Russia) O Doroshina	6	3	1^{r}
Q	(Romania) OG Simion	2	5
WC	(Hungary) A Bondár	6	7
(Croatia) T Lukas	4	0^{r}
(Austria) B Haas	6	1
Q	(Romania) RG Șerban	6	7
2	(Bulgaria) E Kostova	2	5

Second round
5	(Slovakia) J Čepelová	1	0
(Poland) I Świątek	6	6
(Romania) A Cadanțu	3	4
4	(Spain) S Soler Espinosa	6	6
6	(Serbia) I Jorović	7^{9}	6
WC	(Hungary) A Bondár	6^{7}	4
(Austria) B Haas	6	7^{7}
Q	(Romania) RG Șerban	4	6^{1}

Quarterfinals
(Poland) I Świątek	6	6
4	(Spain) S Soler Espinosa	0	4
6	(Serbia) I Jorović	4	6	4
(Austria) B Haas	6	3	6

Semifinals
(Poland) I Świątek	6	6
(Austria) B Haas	2	3
