= 2023 Engie Open Andrézieux-Bouthéon 42 =

Tennis tournament

- Date: 23–29 January 2023
- Edition: 13th
- Category: ITF Women's World Tennis Tour
- Prize money: $60,000
- Surface: Hard / Indoor
- Location: Andrézieux-Bouthéon, France

Champions

Singles
- (France) Océane Dodin

Doubles
- Sofya Lansere / Oksana Selekhmeteva
← 2022 ·	Open Andrézieux-Bouthéon 42	· 2024 →

The 2023 Engie Open Andrézieux-Bouthéon 42 was a professional tennis tournament played on indoor hard courts. It was the thirteenth edition of the tournament which was part of the 2023 ITF Women's World Tennis Tour. It took place in Andrézieux-Bouthéon, France between 23 and 29 January 2023.

== Singles main-draw entrants ==
=== Seeds ===
Country	Player	Rank^{1}	Seed
FRA	Océane Dodin	121	1
SUI	Ylena In-Albon	123	2
SUI	Simona Waltert	128	3
	Erika Andreeva	137	4
FRA	Elsa Jacquemot	145	5
UKR	Daria Snigur	147	6
FRA	Chloé Paquet	163	7
FRA	Jessika Ponchet	164	8

- ^{1} Rankings are as of 16 January 2023.

=== Other entrants ===
The following players received wildcards into the singles main draw:

- (France) Émeline Dartron
- (France) Gaëlle Desperrier
- (France) Elsa Jacquemot
- (France) Tiantsoa Sarah Rakotomanga Rajaonah

The following players received entry from the qualifying draw:

- (France) Julie Belgraver
- Maria Bondarenko
- (Czech Republic) Aneta Laboutková
- (Romania) Andreea Mitu
- (France) Amandine Monnot
- (Switzerland) Céline Naef
- (France) Chloé Noël
- (France) Alice Tubello

The following players received entry from the special ranking draw:

- (Spain) Georgina García Pérez
- Sofya Lansere

== Champions ==
=== Singles ===
- (France) Océane Dodin def. (France) Audrey Albié, 3–6, 6–2, 7–5

=== Doubles ===
- Sofya Lansere / Oksana Selekhmeteva def. (Switzerland) Conny Perrin / Iryna Shymanovich, 6–3, 6–0
