= 2024 Engie Open Andrézieux-Bouthéon 42 – Singles =

Singles
- 2024 Engie Open Andrézieux-Bouthéon 42

Final
- Champion: (United Kingdom) Lily Miyazaki
- Runner-up: (France) Jessika Ponchet
- Score: 3–6, 6–4, 6–1

Events
Singles	Doubles
← 2023 ·	Open Andrézieux-Bouthéon 42	· 2025 →

Océane Dodin was the defending champion but lost in the semifinals to Lily Miyazaki.

Miyazaki won the title, defeating Jessika Ponchet in the final, 3–6, 6–4, 6–1.

== Seeds ==
1. (France) Océane Dodin (semifinals)
2. (Sweden) Rebecca Peterson (quarterfinals)
3. (France) Jessika Ponchet (final)
4. (France) Léolia Jeanjean (first round)
5. (France) Fiona Ferro (second round)
6. (Czech Republic) Tereza Martincová (semifinals)
7. (Croatia) Petra Marčinko (first round)
8. (France) Elsa Jacquemot (quarterfinals)

== Draw ==
=== Key ===
- Q = Qualifier
- WC = Wild card
- LL = Lucky loser
- Alt = Alternate
- SE = Special exempt
- PR = Protected ranking
- ITF = ITF entry
- JE = Junior exempt
- w/o = Walkover
- r = Retired
- d = Defaulted
- SR = Special ranking

=== Finals ===
Semifinals
1	(France) Océane Dodin	6	5	4
(United Kingdom) Lily Miyazaki	3	7	6
3	(France) Jessika Ponchet	6	6
6	(Czech Republic) Tereza Martincová	3	4

Final
(United Kingdom) Lily Miyazaki	3	6	6
3	(France) Jessika Ponchet	6	4	1

=== Top half ===
First round
1	(France) O Dodin	6	6
(France) L Boisson	4	4
Q	(Romania) IG Ghioroaie	3	7^{7}	6^{2}
J Avdeeva	6	6^{4}	7^{7}
(Malta) F Curmi	7	6
(France) H Tan	5	4
WC	(France) A Monnot	3	3
8	(France) E Jacquemot	6	6
4	(France) L Jeanjean	6^{4}	7	2
WC	(France) A Albié	7^{7}	5	6
(United Kingdom) L Miyazaki	6	6
WC	(France) M Szostak	2	0
Q	(United Kingdom) E Appleton	4	7^{7}	6
(Turkey) B Cengiz	6	6^{4}	1
Q	A Charaeva	4	6^{1}
5	(France) F Ferro	6	7^{7}

Second round
1	(France) O Dodin	4	6	6
J Avdeeva	6	0	4
(Malta) F Curmi	6	6^{3}	4
8	(France) E Jacquemot	4	7^{7}	6
WC	(France) A Albié	1	4
(United Kingdom) L Miyazaki	6	6
Q	(United Kingdom) E Appleton	5	7^{7}	6
5	(France) F Ferro	7	6^{4}	2

Quarterfinals
1	(France) O Dodin	6	6
8	(France) E Jacquemot	3	2
(United Kingdom) L Miyazaki	6	6^{5}	6
Q	(United Kingdom) E Appleton	2	7^{7}	1

Semifinals
1	(France) O Dodin	6	5	4
(United Kingdom) L Miyazaki	3	7	6

=== Bottom half ===
First round
7	(Croatia) P Marčinko	6^{5}	6^{6}
(Turkey) İ Öz	7^{7}	7^{8}
WC	(France) A Tubello	2	6	7^{7}
(Cyprus) R Șerban	6	0	6^{3}
Q	(Burundi) S Nahimana	1	6^{2}
(France) M Rouvroy	6	7^{7}
(Switzerland) V Ryser	6	4	1
3	(France) J Ponchet	1	6	6
6	(Czech Republic) T Martincová	6	6
Q	(France) D Martynov	4	1
Q	(Czech Republic) B Palicová	7^{7}	3	6
(Andorra) V Jiménez Kasintseva	6^{5}	6	3
Q	(Belgium) M Kempen	7^{7}	2	7^{7}
Q	(United Kingdom) SB Grey	6^{4}	6	6^{5}
(France) A Robbe	2	3
2	(Sweden) R Peterson	6	6

Second round
(Turkey) İ Öz	6	3	1^{r}
WC	(France) A Tubello	2	6	3
(France) M Rouvroy	2	1
3	(France) J Ponchet	6	6
6	(Czech Republic) T Martincová	4	6	6
Q	(Czech Republic) B Palicová	6	3	2
Q	(Belgium) M Kempen	3	7^{7}	4
2	(Sweden) R Peterson	6	6^{4}	6

Quarterfinals
WC	(France) A Tubello	6^{4}	3
3	(France) J Ponchet	7^{7}	6
6	(Czech Republic) T Martincová	7^{7}	6
2	(Sweden) R Peterson	6^{4}	4

Semifinals
3	(France) J Ponchet	6	6
6	(Czech Republic) T Martincová	3	4
