= 2024 Engie Open Andrézieux-Bouthéon 42 =

Tennis tournament

- Date: 29 January–4 February 2024
- Edition: 14th
- Category: ITF Women's World Tennis Tour
- Prize money: $60,000
- Surface: Hard / Indoor
- Location: Andrézieux-Bouthéon, France

Champions

Singles
- (United Kingdom) Lily Miyazaki

Doubles
- Alevtina Ibragimova / Ekaterina Ovcharenko
← 2023 ·	Open Andrézieux-Bouthéon 42	· 2025 →

The 2024 Engie Open Andrézieux-Bouthéon 42 was a professional tennis tournament played on indoor hard courts. It was the fourteenth edition of the tournament which was part of the 2024 ITF Women's World Tennis Tour. It took place in Andrézieux-Bouthéon, France between 29 January and 4 February 2024.

== Champions ==
=== Singles ===
- (United Kingdom) Lily Miyazaki def. (France) Jessika Ponchet, 3–6, 6–4, 6–1

=== Doubles ===
- Alevtina Ibragimova / Ekaterina Ovcharenko def. (United Kingdom) Emily Appleton / (United Kingdom) Freya Christie, 3–6, 6–3, [10–5]

== Singles main-draw entrants ==
=== Seeds ===
Country	Player	Rank^{1}	Seed
FRA	Océane Dodin	95	1
SWE	Rebecca Peterson	128	2
FRA	Jessika Ponchet	132	3
FRA	Léolia Jeanjean	143	4
FRA	Fiona Ferro	153	5
CZE	Tereza Martincová	154	6
CRO	Petra Marčinko	175	7
FRA	Elsa Jacquemot	176	8

- ^{1} Rankings are as of 15 January 2024.

=== Other entrants ===
The following players received wildcards into the singles main draw:

- (France) Audrey Albié
- (France) Amandine Monnot
- (France) Marine Szostak
- (France) Alice Tubello

The following players received entry from the qualifying draw:

- (United Kingdom) Emily Appleton
- Alina Charaeva
- (Romania) Ilona Georgiana Ghioroaie
- (United Kingdom) Sarah Beth Grey
- (Belgium) Magali Kempen
- (France) Diana Martynov
- (Burundi) Sada Nahimana
- (Czech Republic) Barbora Palicová
