= 2022 Engie Open Andrézieux-Bouthéon 42 – Doubles =

Doubles
- 2022 Engie Open Andrézieux-Bouthéon 42

Final
- Champions: (France) Estelle Cascino (France) Jessika Ponchet
- Runners-up: (United Kingdom) Alicia Barnett (United Kingdom) Olivia Nicholls
- Score: 6–4, 6–1

Events
Singles	Doubles
← 2021 ·	Open Andrézieux-Bouthéon 42	· 2023 →

Lu Jiajing and You Xiaodi were the defending champions but chose not to participate.

Estelle Cascino and Jessika Ponchet won the title, defeating Alicia Barnett and Olivia Nicholls in the final, 6–4, 6–1.

== Seeds ==
1. (France) Estelle Cascino / (France) Jessika Ponchet (champions)
2. (United Kingdom) Alicia Barnett / (United Kingdom) Olivia Nicholls (final)
3. (Switzerland) Xenia Knoll / (Spain) Rebeka Masarova (semifinals)
4. (France) Elsa Jacquemot / (France) Léolia Jeanjean (semifinals)

== Draw ==
=== Key ===
- Q = Qualifier
- WC = Wild card
- LL = Lucky loser
- Alt = Alternate
- SE = Special exempt
- PR = Protected ranking
- ITF = ITF entry
- JE = Junior exempt
- w/o = Walkover
- r = Retired
- d = Defaulted
- SR = Special ranking

=== Draw ===
First round
WC	(France) L Collin (France) N Oliveras	3	0
(France) V Muntean (Cyprus) R Șerban	6	6
(Czech Republic) L Fruhvirtová (Slovakia) R Šramková	6	6
(France) M Szostak (France) TL Truong	2	2
(France) E Mazzoni (France) J Mazzoni	3	1
(France) A Droguet (France) M Rouvroy	6	6

Quarterfinals
1	(France) E Cascino (France) J Ponchet	6	6
(France) V Muntean (Cyprus) R Șerban	4	1
4	(France) E Jacquemot (France) L Jeanjean	6	7
(Czech Republic) L Fruhvirtová (Slovakia) R Šramková	0	5
(France) A Droguet (France) M Rouvroy	6	2	[7]
3	(Switzerland) X Knoll (Spain) R Masarova	4	6	[10]
(Russia) E Andreeva (Turkey) B Cengiz	6	5	[9]
2	(United Kingdom) A Barnett (United Kingdom) O Nicholls	3	7	[11]

Semifinals
1	(France) E Cascino (France) J Ponchet	6	7
4	(France) E Jacquemot (France) L Jeanjean	4	5
3	(Switzerland) X Knoll (Spain) R Masarova	1	6	[9]
2	(United Kingdom) A Barnett (United Kingdom) O Nicholls	6	3	[11]

Final
1	(France) E Cascino (France) J Ponchet	6	6
2	(United Kingdom) A Barnett (United Kingdom) O Nicholls	4	1
