= 2020 French Open – Women's singles =

Tennis tournament

Women's singles
- 2020 French Open

Final
- Champion: (Poland) Iga Świątek
- Runner-up: (United States) Sofia Kenin
- Score: 6–4, 6–1

Details
- Draw: 128 (12 Q / 8 WC)
- Seeds: 32

Events
Singles	men	women		boys	girls
Doubles	men	women	mixed	boys	girls
WC Singles	men	women	quad
WC Doubles	men	women	quad
Legends	−45	45+	women
- French Open

Iga Świątek defeated Sofia Kenin in the final, 6–4, 6–1 to win the women's singles tennis title at the 2020 French Open. It was her first major title and first WTA Tour-level singles title overall. Ranked as the world No. 54, she was the lowest-ranked player to win the title since the WTA rankings were introduced in 1975. Świątek was the first Pole to win a major singles title. At 19 years and 4 months of age, she was the youngest woman to win the title since Monica Seles in 1992. Świątek did not lose a set during the tournament, dropping only 28 games in total, the fewest since Steffi Graf dropped 20 games in 1988. This marked the first French Open where both the men's and women's singles champions did not lose a set during the tournament. Additionally, it is the only time in the Open Era that the men's and women's singles champions at any grand slam tournament did not lose a set during the tournament. Świątek was the first Polish woman since Jadwiga Jędrzejowska in 1939 to reach the French Open final, and she was the first to reach any major final since Agnieszka Radwańska at the 2012 Wimbledon Championships.

Ashleigh Barty was the reigning champion, but chose not to participate due to safety concerns resulting from the ongoing COVID-19 pandemic. This marked the first time since 2008 that the reigning champion did not attempt to defend their title.

Barty and Simona Halep were in contention for the world No. 1 singles ranking. Barty retained the top ranking when Halep lost to Świątek in the fourth round, ensuring a year-end No. 1 ranking for the second consecutive year. Halep's loss guaranteed a new French Open champion for the fifth consecutive year, and a first-time major finalist from the top half of the draw.

This marked the final major appearance of Olympic gold medalist Monica Puig; she lost to Sara Errani in the first round. It was also the first main-draw French Open appearance of future world No. 2 and champion Coco Gauff, who lost to Martina Trevisan in the second round.

This was the first major since the 1999 Wimbledon Championships where two qualifiers, Nadia Podoroska and Trevisan, reached the quarterfinals. Podoroska was the first qualifier to reach the semifinals of the French Open and the first to reach the semifinals at any major since Alexandra Stevenson at the 1999 Wimbledon Championships. She also became the first Argentine woman since Paola Suarez at the 2004 French Open to reach the semifinals of a singles major, and the lowest-ranked semifinalist (ranked No. 130) at any major since Justine Henin at the 2010 Australian Open.

== Seeds ==
Seeding per WTA rankings.

1. (Romania) Simona Halep (fourth round)
2. (Czech Republic) Karolína Plíšková (second round)
3. (Ukraine) Elina Svitolina (quarterfinals)
4. (United States) Sofia Kenin (final)
5. (Netherlands) Kiki Bertens (fourth round)
6. (United States) Serena Williams (second round, withdrew)
7. (Czech Republic) Petra Kvitová (semifinals)
8. (Belarus) Aryna Sabalenka (third round)
9. (United Kingdom) Johanna Konta (first round)
10. (Belarus) Victoria Azarenka (second round)
11. (Spain) Garbiñe Muguruza (third round)
12. (United States) Madison Keys (first round)
13. (Croatia) Petra Martić (third round)
14. (Kazakhstan) Elena Rybakina (second round)
15. (Czech Republic) Markéta Vondroušová (first round)
16. (Belgium) Elise Mertens (third round)

17. (Estonia) Anett Kontaveit (first round)
18. (Germany) Angelique Kerber (first round)
19. (United States) Alison Riske (first round)
20. (Greece) Maria Sakkari (third round)
21. (United States) Jennifer Brady (first round)
22. (Czech Republic) Karolína Muchová (first round)
23. (Kazakhstan) Yulia Putintseva (second round)
24. (Ukraine) Dayana Yastremska (first round)
25. (United States) Amanda Anisimova (third round)
26. (Croatia) Donna Vekić (first round)
27. (Russia) Ekaterina Alexandrova (third round)
28. (Russia) Svetlana Kuznetsova (first round)
29. (United States) Sloane Stephens (second round)
30. (Tunisia) Ons Jabeur (fourth round)
31. (Poland) Magda Linette (first round)
32. (Czech Republic) Barbora Strýcová (second round)

Click on the seed number of a player to go to their draw section.

== Draw ==
Key

- Q = Qualifier
- WC = Wild card
- LL = Lucky loser
- Alt = Alternate
- ITF = ITF entry
- PR = Protected ranking
- SR = Special ranking
- SE = Special exempt
- JE = Junior exempt
- JR = Junior Accelerator Programme entrant
- CO = College Accelerator Programme entrant
- NG = Next Gen Accelerator Program entrant
- w/o = Walkover
- r = Retired
- d = Defaulted

=== Finals ===
Quarterfinals
(Poland) Iga Świątek	6	6
Q	(Italy) Martina Trevisan	3	1
3	(Ukraine) Elina Svitolina	2	4
Q	(Argentina) Nadia Podoroska	6	6
(United States) Danielle Collins	4	6	0
4	(United States) Sofia Kenin	6	4	6
7	(Czech Republic) Petra Kvitová	6	6
(Germany) Laura Siegemund	3	3

Semifinals
(Poland) Iga Świątek	6	6
Q	(Argentina) Nadia Podoroska	2	1
4	(United States) Sofia Kenin	6	7
7	(Czech Republic) Petra Kvitová	4	5

Final
(Poland) Iga Świątek	6	6
4	(United States) Sofia Kenin	4	1

=== Top half ===
==== Section 1 ====
First round
1	(Romania) S Halep	6	6
(Spain) S Sorribes Tormo	4	0
(Romania) I-C Begu	6	4	6
(Switzerland) J Teichmann	4	6	3
PR	(United States) C Bellis	6^{3}	1
(United States) B Pera	7^{7}	6
(Germany) T Korpatsch	2	0
25	(United States) A Anisimova	6	6
24	(Ukraine) D Yastremska	4	3
PR	(Australia) D Gavrilova	6	6
(Russia) A Kalinskaya	4	4
WC	(Canada) E Bouchard	6	6
Q	(Austria) B Haas	3	6^{1}
(Chinese Taipei) S-w Hsieh	6	7^{7}
(Poland) I Świątek	6	6
15	(Czech Republic) M Vondroušová	1	2

Second round
1	(Romania) S Halep	6	6
(Romania) I-C Begu	3	4
(United States) B Pera	2	0
25	(United States) A Anisimova	6	6
PR	(Australia) D Gavrilova	7	4	3
WC	(Canada) E Bouchard	5	6	6
(Chinese Taipei) S-w Hsieh	1	4
(Poland) I Świątek	6	6

Third round
1	(Romania) S Halep	6	6
25	(United States) A Anisimova	0	1
WC	(Canada) E Bouchard	3	2
(Poland) I Świątek	6	6

Fourth round
1	(Romania) S Halep	1	2
(Poland) I Świątek	6	6

==== Section 2 ====
First round
9	(United Kingdom) J Konta	3	3
(United States) C Gauff	6	6
(Italy) C Giorgi	5	0^{r}
Q	(Italy) M Trevisan	7	3
Q	(Russia) K Rakhimova	6	6
(United States) S Rogers	2	3
(Australia) A Tomljanović	0	5
20	(Greece) M Sakkari	6	7
28	(Russia) S Kuznetsova	1	6	1
(Russia) A Pavlyuchenkova	6	2	6
(Czech Republic) K Siniaková	7^{7}	6
(United States) L Davis	6^{5}	2
(Puerto Rico) M Puig	2	1
Q	(Italy) S Errani	6	6
(Ukraine) K Zavatska	6	2	0
5	(Netherlands) K Bertens	2	6	6

Second round
(United States) C Gauff	6	2	5
Q	(Italy) M Trevisan	4	6	7
Q	(Russia) K Rakhimova	6^{0}	2
20	(Greece) M Sakkari	7^{7}	6
(Russia) A Pavlyuchenkova	3	4
(Czech Republic) K Siniaková	6	6
Q	(Italy) S Errani	6^{5}	6	7
5	(Netherlands) K Bertens	7^{7}	3	9

Third round
Q	(Italy) M Trevisan	1	7^{8}	6
20	(Greece) M Sakkari	6	6^{6}	3
(Czech Republic) K Siniaková	2	2
5	(Netherlands) K Bertens	6	6

Fourth round
Q	(Italy) M Trevisan	6	6
5	(Netherlands) K Bertens	4	4

==== Section 3 ====
First round
3	(Ukraine) E Svitolina	7^{7}	6
(Russia) V Gracheva	6^{2}	4
Q	(Mexico) R Zarazúa	6	6
WC	(France) E Jacquemot	1	2
(Russia) A Blinkova	3	6	5
LL	(Australia) A Sharma	6	2	7
(Australia) M Inglis	3	3
27	(Russia) E Alexandrova	6	6
17	(Estonia) A Kontaveit	4	6	4
(France) C Garcia	6	3	6
(Belarus) A Sasnovich	6	2	6
(Germany) A-L Friedsam	2	6	3
(Czech Republic) M Bouzková	6	4	2
(Estonia) K Kanepi	4	6	6
(Russia) M Gasparyan	2	3
16	(Belgium) E Mertens	6	6

Second round
3	(Ukraine) E Svitolina	6	0	6
Q	(Mexico) R Zarazúa	3	6	2
LL	(Australia) A Sharma	3	3
27	(Russia) E Alexandrova	6	6
(France) C Garcia	7^{7}	6
(Belarus) A Sasnovich	6^{5}	2
(Estonia) K Kanepi	4	5
16	(Belgium) E Mertens	6	7

Third round
3	(Ukraine) E Svitolina	6	7
27	(Russia) E Alexandrova	4	5
(France) C Garcia	1	6	7
16	(Belgium) E Mertens	6	4	5

Fourth round
3	(Ukraine) E Svitolina	6	6
(France) C Garcia	1	3

==== Section 4 ====
First round
10	(Belarus) V Azarenka	6	6
(Montenegro) D Kovinić	1	2
PR	(Slovakia) AK Schmiedlová	6	6
(United States) V Williams	4	4
(Belgium) G Minnen	2	1
Q	(Argentina) N Podoroska	6	6
(Belgium) K Flipkens	1	2
23	(Kazakhstan) Y Putintseva	6	6
32	(Czech Republic) B Strýcová	7	6
Q	(United States) V Lepchenko	5	2
(Serbia) N Stojanović	3	5
(Czech Republic) B Krejčíková	6	7
WC	(Bulgaria) T Pironkova	6	6
(Germany) A Petkovic	3	3
(United States) K Ahn	6^{2}	0
6	(United States) S Williams	7^{7}	6

Second round
10	(Belarus) V Azarenka	2	2
PR	(Slovakia) AK Schmiedlová	6	6
Q	(Argentina) N Podoroska	6	1	6
23	(Kazakhstan) Y Putintseva	3	6	2
32	(Czech Republic) B Strýcová	4	6	3
(Czech Republic) B Krejčíková	6	3	6
WC	(Bulgaria) T Pironkova	w/o
6	(United States) S Williams

Third round
PR	(Slovakia) AK Schmiedlová	3	2
Q	(Argentina) N Podoroska	6	6
(Czech Republic) B Krejčíková	5	6	6
WC	(Bulgaria) T Pironkova	7	4	3

Fourth round
Q	(Argentina) N Podoroska	2	6	6
(Czech Republic) B Krejčíková	6	2	3

=== Bottom half ===
==== Section 5 ====
First round
8	(Belarus) A Sabalenka	6	6
(United States) J Pegula	3	1
(Russia) D Kasatkina	6	6
WC	(France) H Tan	2	1
(Japan) N Hibino	6	6
Q	(Ukraine) M Kostyuk	4	0
(Kazakhstan) Z Diyas	6	3	1
30	(Tunisia) O Jabeur	4	6	6
21	(United States) J Brady	4	6	7
Q	(Denmark) C Tauson	6	3	9
Q	(Romania) M Niculescu	6	2	1
(United States) D Collins	2	6	6
(Slovakia) V Kužmová	1	2
(Czech Republic) Kr Plíšková	6	6
(Slovenia) T Zidanšek	5	6	6
11	(Spain) G Muguruza	7	4	8

Second round
8	(Belarus) A Sabalenka	7^{8}	6
(Russia) D Kasatkina	6^{6}	0
(Japan) N Hibino	6^{4}	4
30	(Tunisia) O Jabeur	7^{7}	6
Q	(Denmark) C Tauson	2	3
(United States) D Collins	6	6
(Czech Republic) Kr Plíšková	3	2
11	(Spain) G Muguruza	6	6

Third round
8	(Belarus) A Sabalenka	6^{7}	6	3
30	(Tunisia) O Jabeur	7^{9}	2	6
(United States) D Collins	7	2	6
11	(Spain) G Muguruza	5	6	4

Fourth round
30	(Tunisia) O Jabeur	4	6	4
(United States) D Collins	6	4	6

==== Section 6 ====
First round
14	(Kazakhstan) E Rybakina	6	6
(Romania) S Cîrstea	0	3
(France) F Ferro	7^{7}	6
(United Kingdom) H Watson	6^{4}	4
(Switzerland) S Vögele	5	5
(Romania) PM Țig	7	7
(United States) C McHale	6	6
22	(Czech Republic) K Muchová	2	4
26	(Croatia) D Vekić	3	4
Q	(Romania) I Bara	6	6
(Belgium) A Van Uytvanck	2	6	6
(Sweden) R Peterson	6	3	1
(Hungary) T Babos	4	2
(Romania) A Bogdan	6	6
(Russia) L Samsonova	4	6	3
4	(United States) S Kenin	6	3	6

Second round
14	(Kazakhstan) E Rybakina	3	6	2
(France) F Ferro	6	4	6
(Romania) PM Țig	6	6
(United States) C McHale	4	3
Q	(Romania) I Bara	6	4
(Belgium) A Van Uytvanck	1	0^{r}
(Romania) A Bogdan	6	3	2
4	(United States) S Kenin	3	6	6

Third round
(France) F Ferro	7^{9}	4	6
(Romania) PM Țig	6^{7}	6	0
Q	(Romania) I Bara	2	0
4	(United States) S Kenin	6	6

Fourth round
(France) F Ferro	6	2	1
4	(United States) S Kenin	2	6	6

==== Section 7 ====
First round
7	(Czech Republic) P Kvitová	6	7
(France) O Dodin	3	5
(Spain) A Bolsova	4	3
(Italy) J Paolini	6	6
WC	(France) D Parry	4	2
(Slovenia) P Hercog	6	6
(Canada) L Fernandez	1	6	6
31	(Poland) M Linette	6	2	3
18	(Germany) A Kerber	3	3
(Slovenia) K Juvan	6	6
(Netherlands) A Rus	7^{9}	6^{2}	3
WC	(France) C Burel	6^{7}	7^{7}	6
WC	(France) C Paquet	3	2
(France) A Cornet	6	6
(China) S Zhang	6	7^{7}
12	(United States) M Keys	3	6^{2}

Second round
7	(Czech Republic) P Kvitová	6	6
(Italy) J Paolini	3	3
(Slovenia) P Hercog	4	6	1
(Canada) L Fernandez	6	3	6
(Slovenia) K Juvan	6^{6}	2
WC	(France) C Burel	7^{8}	6
(France) A Cornet	4	6^{3}
(China) S Zhang	6	7^{7}

Third round
7	(Czech Republic) P Kvitová	7	6
(Canada) L Fernandez	5	3
WC	(France) C Burel	6^{2}	5
(China) S Zhang	7^{7}	7

Fourth round
7	(Czech Republic) P Kvitová	6	6
(China) S Zhang	2	4

==== Section 8 ====
First round
13	(Croatia) P Martić	7^{7}	7
(Japan) M Doi	6^{2}	5
WC	(France) P Parmentier	2	3
(Russia) V Kudermetova	6	6
(Germany) L Siegemund	7	6
(France) K Mladenovic	5	3
(Germany) J Görges	6	6^{4}	6
19	(United States) A Riske	3	7^{7}	1
29	(United States) S Stephens	6	6
(Russia) V Diatchenko	2	2
(Ukraine) K Kozlova	2	6	3
(Spain) P Badosa	6	4	6
(Latvia) J Ostapenko	6	6
(United States) M Brengle	2	1
Q	(Egypt) M Sherif	7^{11}	2	4
2	(Czech Republic) Ka Plíšková	6^{9}	6	6

Second round
13	(Croatia) P Martić	6^{1}	7	6
(Russia) V Kudermetova	7^{7}	5	3
(Germany) L Siegemund	1	6	6
(Germany) J Görges	6	1	3
29	(United States) S Stephens	4	6	2
(Spain) P Badosa	6	4	6
(Latvia) J Ostapenko	6	6
2	(Czech Republic) Ka Plíšková	4	2

Third round
13	(Croatia) P Martić	7^{7}	3	0
(Germany) L Siegemund	6^{5}	6	6
(Spain) P Badosa	6	6
(Latvia) J Ostapenko	4	3

Fourth round
(Germany) L Siegemund	7	6
(Spain) P Badosa	5	2

== Championship match statistics ==
Category	(Poland) Świątek	(United States) Kenin
1st serve %	28/53 (53%)	37/54 (69%)
1st serve points won	19 of 28 = 68%	17 of 37 = 46%
2nd serve points won	13 of 25 = 52%	4 of 17 = 24%
Total service points won	32 of 53 = 60.38%	21 of 54 = 38.89%
Aces	1	1
Double faults	3	3
Winners	25	10
Unforced errors	17	23
Net points won	6 of 7 = 86%	2 of 7 = 29%
Break points converted	6 of 9 = 67%	3 of 3 = 100%
Return points won	33 of 54 = 61%	21 of 53 = 40%
Total points won	65	42

== Other entry information ==
=== Wild cards ===
- (Canada) Eugenie Bouchard
- (France) Clara Burel
- (France) Elsa Jacquemot
- (France) Chloé Paquet
- (France) Pauline Parmentier
- (France) Diane Parry
- (Bulgaria) Tsvetana Pironkova
- (France) Harmony Tan

=== Protected ranking ===
- (United States) Catherine Bellis (45)
- (Australia) Daria Gavrilova (104)
- (Slovakia) Anna Karolína Schmiedlová (93)

=== Qualifiers ===
- (Romania) Irina Bara
- (Italy) Sara Errani
- (Austria) Barbara Haas
- (Ukraine) Marta Kostyuk
- (United States) Varvara Lepchenko
- (Romania) Monica Niculescu
- (Argentina) Nadia Podoroska
- (Russia) Kamilla Rakhimova
- (Egypt) Mayar Sherif
- (Denmark) Clara Tauson
- (Italy) Martina Trevisan
- (Mexico) Renata Zarazúa

=== Lucky loser ===
- (Australia) Astra Sharma

=== Withdrawals ===
Before the tournament

- (Canada) Bianca Andreescu → replaced by (Russia) Liudmila Samsonova
- (Australia) Ashleigh Barty → replaced by (Switzerland) Stefanie Vögele
- (Switzerland) Belinda Bencic → replaced by (Australia) Astra Sharma
- (Germany) Tatjana Maria → replaced by (Australia) Maddison Inglis
- (Japan) Naomi Osaka → replaced by (Germany) Tamara Korpatsch
- (China) Peng Shuai → replaced by (Slovenia) Kaja Juvan
- (Russia) Anastasia Potapova → replaced by (Russia) Anna Kalinskaya
- (Latvia) Anastasija Sevastova → replaced by (Russia) Margarita Gasparyan
- (Australia) Samantha Stosur → replaced by (Russia) Vitalia Diatchenko
- (Spain) Carla Suárez Navarro → replaced by (Belgium) Greet Minnen
- (United States) Taylor Townsend → replaced by (France) Océane Dodin
- (China) Wang Qiang → replaced by (Czech Republic) Barbora Krejčíková
- (China) Wang Yafan → replaced by (Germany) Anna-Lena Friedsam
- (China) Zheng Saisai → replaced by (Belarus) Aliaksandra Sasnovich
- (China) Zhu Lin → replaced by (Ukraine) Katarina Zavatska

During the tournament

- (United States) Serena Williams (achilles injury)
- (Belgium) Alison Van Uytvanck
- (Italy) Camila Giorgi

Preceded by 2020 US Open – Women's singles	Grand Slam women's singles	Succeeded by 2021 Australian Open – Women's singles
