= 2024 Engie Open Andrézieux-Bouthéon 42 – Doubles =

Doubles
- 2024 Engie Open Andrézieux-Bouthéon 42

Final
- Champions: Alevtina Ibragimova; Ekaterina Ovcharenko
- Runners-up: (United Kingdom) Emily Appleton (United Kingdom) Freya Christie
- Score: 3–6, 6–3, [10–5]

Events
| Singles | Doubles |
| ← 2023 · | Open Andrézieux-Bouthéon 42 | · 2025 → |

Sofya Lansere and Oksana Selekhmeteva were the defending champions but chose not to participate.

Alevtina Ibragimova and Ekaterina Ovcharenko won the title, defeating Emily Appleton and Freya Christie in the final, 3–6, 6–3, [10–5].

== Seeds ==
1. (United Kingdom) Emily Appleton / (United Kingdom) Freya Christie (final)
2. (United Kingdom) Sarah Beth Grey / (United Kingdom) Eden Silva (semifinals)
3. (France) Estelle Cascino / (Belgium) Magali Kempen (semifinals)
4. (Germany) Tayisiya Morderger / (Germany) Yana Morderger (first round)

== Draw ==
=== Key ===
- Q = Qualifier
- WC = Wild card
- LL = Lucky loser
- Alt = Alternate
- SE = Special exempt
- PR = Protected ranking
- ITF = ITF entry
- JE = Junior exempt
- w/o = Walkover
- r = Retired
- d = Defaulted
- SR = Special ranking

First round
(Ukraine) M Kostiuk (Chinese Taipei) Y-h Lee | 2 | 3
J Avdeeva; E Reyngold | 6 | 6
3 | (France) E Cascino (Belgium) M Kempen | 6 | 7
(France) A Albié (France) L Boisson | 3 | 5
(France) M Léonard (France) A Robbe | 6 | 6
WC | (France) F Brugnone (France) N Oliveras | 2 | 3
(France) M Szostak (France) A Tubello | 2 | 2
(France) E Jacquemot (Cyprus) R Șerban | 6 | 6
A Ibragimova; E Ovcharenko | 6 | 6
4 | (Germany) T Morderger (Germany) Y Morderger | 1 | 4
A Gureva (Croatia) P Marčinko | 6 | 7
(Malta) F Curmi (Greece) M Matoula | 2 | 5
(Turkey) B Cengiz (United Kingdom) L Miyazaki | 3 | 1
2 | (United Kingdom) SB Grey (United Kingdom) E Silva | 6 | 6

Quarterfinals
1 | (United Kingdom) E Appleton (United Kingdom) F Christie | w/o
J Avdeeva; E Reyngold
3 | (France) E Cascino (Belgium) M Kempen | 4 | 6 | [10]
(France) M Léonard (France) A Robbe | 6 | 1 | [4]
(France) E Jacquemot (Cyprus) R Șerban
A Ibragimova; E Ovcharenko | w/o
A Gureva (Croatia) P Marčinko
2 | (United Kingdom) SB Grey (United Kingdom) E Silva | w/o

Semifinals
1 | (United Kingdom) E Appleton (United Kingdom) F Christie | 6^{4} | 6 | [10]
3 | (France) E Cascino (Belgium) M Kempen | 7^{7} | 0 | [8]
A Ibragimova; E Ovcharenko | 3 | 7^{7} | [10]
2 | (United Kingdom) SB Grey (United Kingdom) E Silva | 6 | 6^{5} | [8]

Final
1 | (United Kingdom) E Appleton (United Kingdom) F Christie | 6 | 3 | [5]
A Ibragimova; E Ovcharenko | 3 | 6 | [10]
