= 2023 Engie Open Andrézieux-Bouthéon 42 – Singles =

Singles
- 2023 Engie Open Andrézieux-Bouthéon 42

Final
- Champion: (France) Océane Dodin
- Runner-up: (France) Audrey Albié
- Score: 3–6, 6–2, 7–5

Events
Singles	Doubles
← 2022 ·	Open Andrézieux-Bouthéon 42	· 2024 →

Ana Bogdan was the defending champion but chose not to participate.

Océane Dodin won the title, defeating Audrey Albié in the final, 3–6, 6–2, 7–5.

== Seeds ==
1. (France) Océane Dodin (champion)
2. (Switzerland) Ylena In-Albon (first round)
3. (Switzerland) Simona Waltert (quarterfinals)
4. Erika Andreeva (second round)
5. (France) Elsa Jacquemot (second round)
6. (Ukraine) Daria Snigur (semifinals)
7. (France) Chloé Paquet (first round)
8. (France) Jessika Ponchet (quarterfinals)

== Draw ==
=== Key ===
- Q = Qualifier
- WC = Wild card
- LL = Lucky loser
- Alt = Alternate
- SE = Special exempt
- PR = Protected ranking
- ITF = ITF entry
- JE = Junior exempt
- w/o = Walkover
- r = Retired
- d = Defaulted
- SR = Special ranking

=== Finals ===
Semifinals
1	(France) Océane Dodin	6	6
6	(Ukraine) Daria Snigur	3	2
Oksana Selekhmeteva	4	4
(France) Audrey Albié	6	6

Final
1	(France) Océane Dodin	3	6	7
(France) Audrey Albié	6	2	5

=== Top half ===
First round
1	(France) O Dodin	6	6
(France) L Nguyen Tan	4	2
(Romania) A Cadanțu-Ignatik	1	0
PR	S Lansere	6	6
(France) A Robbe	3	2
Q	(France) A Tubello	6	6
WC	(France) É Dartron	4	6^{1}
8	(France) J Ponchet	6	7^{7}
4	E Andreeva	6	6
Q	M Bondarenko	0	0
(Turkey) Z Sönmez	6	5	6
(Romania) I Bara	4	7	4
(Switzerland) S Bandecchi	6	6
Q	(France) C Noël	2	2
Q	(Romania) A Mitu	5	6	5
6	(Ukraine) D Snigur	7	4	7

Second round
1	(France) O Dodin	7^{7}	6
PR	S Lansere	6^{4}	2
Q	(France) A Tubello	6^{11}	5
8	(France) J Ponchet	7^{13}	7
4	E Andreeva	4	6^{4}
(Turkey) Z Sönmez	6	7^{7}
(Switzerland) S Bandecchi	3	3
6	(Ukraine) D Snigur	6	6

Quarterfinals
1	(France) O Dodin	4	6	7
8	(France) J Ponchet	6	1	5
(Turkey) Z Sönmez	3	5
6	(Ukraine) D Snigur	6	7

Semifinals
1	(France) O Dodin	6	6
6	(Ukraine) D Snigur	3	2

=== Bottom half ===
First round
7	(France) C Paquet	5	4
O Selekhmeteva	7	6
I Shymanovich	6	6
Q	(Czech Republic) A Laboutková	3	4
Q	(Switzerland) C Naef	3	6	6
(Switzerland) A Rushiti	6	3	4
WC	(France) TS Rakotomanga Rajaonah	2	4
3	(Switzerland) S Waltert	6	6
5/WC	(France) E Jacquemot	6	7
(Spain) G García Pérez	3	5
WC	(France) G Desperrier	4	3
(France) A Albié	6	6
Q	(France) A Monnot	6	5	6
Q	(France) J Belgraver	4	7	4
(Poland) U Radwańska	6	4	6
2	(Switzerland) Y In-Albon	4	6	2

Second round
O Selekhmeteva	6	6
I Shymanovich	3	1
Q	(Switzerland) C Naef	6	3	4
3	(Switzerland) S Waltert	2	6	6
5/WC	(France) E Jacquemot	6	5	3
(France) A Albié	4	7	6
Q	(France) A Monnot	6	5	6
(Poland) U Radwańska	3	7	4

Quarterfinals
O Selekhmeteva	6	6
3	(Switzerland) S Waltert	3	3
(France) A Albié	6	6
Q	(France) A Monnot	1	3

Semifinals
O Selekhmeteva	4	4
(France) A Albié	6	6
