= 2021 US Open – Women's singles qualifying =

Women's singles qualifying
- 2021 US Open

Events
Singles	men	women		boys	girls
Doubles	men	women	mixed	boys	girls
WC Singles	men	women	quad
WC Doubles	men	women	quad
Legends	men	women	mixed

Qualification
Singles	men	women
← 2019 ·	US Open	· 2022 →

The 2021 US Open – Women's Singles Qualifying was a series of tennis matches from 24 August 2021 to 27 August 2021 where 128 players competed to determine the 16 qualifiers into the main draw of the 2021 US Open women's singles tournament, and, if necessary, the lucky losers. Due to pandemic-related restrictions, the qualifying matches were not open to the public.

For the first time in Major singles history, a qualifier, Emma Raducanu, went on to win the main tournament.

== Seeds ==
1. (Croatia) Ana Konjuh (qualified)
2. (Slovakia) Anna Karolína Schmiedlová (qualified)
3. (Spain) Nuria Párrizas Díaz (qualified)
4. (Egypt) Mayar Sherif (qualifying competition, lucky loser)
5. (France) Océane Dodin (qualifying competition)
6. (Belgium) Greet Minnen (qualifying competition, lucky loser)
7. (Romania) Elena-Gabriela Ruse (qualified)
8. (Slovakia) Kristína Kučová (qualifying competition, lucky loser)
9. (Belgium) Maryna Zanevska (second round)
10. (Australia) Astra Sharma (qualified)
11. (Czech Republic) Kristýna Plíšková (qualified)
12. (Bulgaria) Viktoriya Tomova (qualifying competition, lucky loser)
13. (Romania) Irina Bara (first round)
14. (Mexico) Renata Zarazúa (first round)
15. (Poland) Magdalena Fręch (first round)
16. (Germany) Anna-Lena Friedsam (second round)
17. (Ukraine) Kateryna Kozlova (first round)
18. (Switzerland) Stefanie Vögele (qualifying competition, lucky loser)
19. (Belgium) Ysaline Bonaventure (second round)
20. (Russia) Kamilla Rakhimova (qualifying competition, lucky loser)
21. (Belarus) Olga Govortsova (first round)
22. (Russia) Anna Kalinskaya (second round)
23. (France) Harmony Tan (qualifying competition)
24. (Russia) Vitalia Diatchenko (second round)
25. (United States) Kristie Ahn (first round)
26. (Romania) Jaqueline Cristian (qualifying competition)
27. (Ukraine) Katarina Zavatska (first round)
28. (Australia) Maddison Inglis (first round)
29. (Serbia) Olga Danilović (qualified)
30. (Germany) Jule Niemeier (second round)
31. (United Kingdom) Emma Raducanu (qualified, main draw champion)
32. (United Kingdom) Harriet Dart (qualified)

== Qualifiers ==
1. (Croatia) Ana Konjuh
2. (Slovakia) Anna Karolína Schmiedlová
3. (Spain) Nuria Párrizas Díaz
4. (United Kingdom) Emma Raducanu
5. (Spain) Cristina Bucșa
6. (Canada) Rebecca Marino
7. (Romania) Elena-Gabriela Ruse
8. (United Kingdom) Katie Boulter
9. (Greece) Valentini Grammatikopoulou
10. (Australia) Astra Sharma
11. (Czech Republic) Kristýna Plíšková
12. (United Kingdom) Harriet Dart
13. (Serbia) Olga Danilović
14. (Hungary) Dalma Gálfi
15. (Spain) Rebeka Masarova
16. (United States) Jamie Loeb

== Lucky losers ==
1. (Egypt) Mayar Sherif
2. (Slovakia) Kristína Kučová
3. (Bulgaria) Viktoriya Tomova
4. (Belgium) Greet Minnen
5. (Switzerland) Stefanie Vögele
6. (Russia) Kamilla Rakhimova

== Qualifying draw ==
=== First qualifier ===
First round
1	(Croatia) Ana Konjuh	7^{7}	6
(Romania) Irina Fetecău	6^{2}	3
(Austria) Julia Grabher	6	7
(Austria) Barbara Haas	2	5
WC	(United States) Robin Montgomery	4	1
(United Kingdom) Jodie Burrage	6	6
(United States) Whitney Osuigwe	2	2
18	(Switzerland) Stefanie Vögele	6	6

Second round
1	(Croatia) Ana Konjuh	6	7^{7}
(Austria) Julia Grabher	3	6^{2}
(United Kingdom) Jodie Burrage	6	4	6^{4}
18	(Switzerland) Stefanie Vögele	3	6	7^{7}

Qualifying competition
1	(Croatia) Ana Konjuh	6	6
18	(Switzerland) Stefanie Vögele	2	2

=== Second qualifier ===
First round
2	(Slovakia) Anna Karolína Schmiedlová	6	4	6
(France) Tessah Andrianjafitrimo	3	6	3
(Australia) Ellen Perez	5	6^{2}
(Ukraine) Lesia Tsurenko	7	7^{7}
(Slovakia) Rebecca Šramková	6	6
(Australia) Arina Rodionova	4	0
WC	(United States) Reese Brantmeier	6	6
21	(Belarus) Olga Govortsova	2	3

Second round
2	(Slovakia) Anna Karolína Schmiedlová	4	6	7
(Ukraine) Lesia Tsurenko	6	3	5
(Slovakia) Rebecca Šramková	2	6	2
WC	(United States) Reese Brantmeier	6	3	6

Qualifying competition
2	(Slovakia) Anna Karolína Schmiedlová	7^{7}	6
WC	(United States) Reese Brantmeier	6^{5}	3

=== Third qualifier ===
First round
3	(Spain) Nuria Párrizas Díaz	7^{7}	6
(Croatia) Tereza Mrdeža	6^{4}	1
(United States) Francesca Di Lorenzo	6	6
(Serbia) Natalija Stevanović	3	3
(Hungary) Réka Luca Jani	6	7
(Switzerland) Leonie Küng	1	5
(Japan) Yuki Naito	6	3	6
25	(United States) Kristie Ahn	4	6	3

Second round
3	(Spain) Nuria Párrizas Díaz	6	6
(United States) Francesca Di Lorenzo	1	2
(Hungary) Réka Luca Jani	6	6
(Japan) Yuki Naito	2	2

Qualifying competition
3	(Spain) Nuria Párrizas Díaz	6	6
(Hungary) Réka Luca Jani	3	2

=== Fourth qualifier ===
First round
4	(Egypt) Mayar Sherif	6	6
WC	(United States) Clervie Ngounoue	4	3
(France) Jessika Ponchet	2	3
(Belarus) Yuliya Hatouka	6	6
(Georgia (country)) Mariam Bolkvadze	7	4	6
(Ukraine) Daria Snigur	5	6	4
PR	(Netherlands) Bibiane Schoofs	1	2
31	(United Kingdom) Emma Raducanu	6	6

Second round
4	(Egypt) Mayar Sherif	6	6
(Belarus) Yuliya Hatouka	4	4
(Georgia (country)) Mariam Bolkvadze	3	5
31	(United Kingdom) Emma Raducanu	6	7

Qualifying competition
4	(Egypt) Mayar Sherif	1	4
31	(United Kingdom) Emma Raducanu	6	6

=== Fifth qualifier ===
First round
5	(France) Océane Dodin	6	6
(Italy) Jessica Pieri	1	3
WC	(United States) Katrina Scott	7^{7}	4	3
(Hungary) Anna Bondár	6^{2}	6	6
WC	(United States) Elvina Kalieva	6	6
(Japan) Mayo Hibi	3	4
(Spain) Cristina Bucșa	6	6
17	(Ukraine) Kateryna Kozlova	4	1

Second round
5	(France) Océane Dodin	3	7^{7}	6
(Hungary) Anna Bondár	6	6^{2}	3
WC	(United States) Elvina Kalieva	3	3
(Spain) Cristina Bucșa	6	6

Qualifying competition
5	(France) Océane Dodin	4	4
(Spain) Cristina Bucșa	6	6

=== Sixth qualifier ===
First round
6	(Belgium) Greet Minnen	6	6
(Spain) Andrea Lázaro García	3	2
(Japan) Mai Hontama	6^{0}	7	6
(Germany) Mona Barthel	7^{7}	5	2
(Canada) Rebecca Marino	6	6
(Hungary) Panna Udvardy	3	2
(France) Amandine Hesse	5	7	2
19	(Belgium) Ysaline Bonaventure	7	5	6

Second round
6	(Belgium) Greet Minnen	6	7^{7}
(Japan) Mai Hontama	3	6^{3}
(Canada) Rebecca Marino	6	4	6
19	(Belgium) Ysaline Bonaventure	2	6	4

Qualifying competition
6	(Belgium) Greet Minnen	3	6	2
(Canada) Rebecca Marino	6	3	6

=== Seventh qualifier ===
First round
7	(Romania) Elena-Gabriela Ruse	6	6^{5}	6
(Paraguay) Verónica Cepede Royg	2	7^{7}	3
(Japan) Kurumi Nara	6	7^{7}
(Turkey) Çağla Büyükakçay	4	6^{4}
(Italy) Federica Di Sarra	2	7	6
(Germany) Katharina Gerlach	6	5	4
(Poland) Urszula Radwańska	6	7
27	(Ukraine) Katarina Zavatska	3	5

Second round
7	(Romania) Elena-Gabriela Ruse	7	6
(Japan) Kurumi Nara	5	1
(Italy) Federica Di Sarra	6	2	6
(Poland) Urszula Radwańska	4	6	3

Qualifying competition
7	(Romania) Elena-Gabriela Ruse	6	6
(Italy) Federica Di Sarra	3	0

=== Eighth qualifier ===
First round
8	(Slovakia) Kristína Kučová	6	6
(Chile) Daniela Seguel	3	2
(Bulgaria) Isabella Shinikova	6	6^{10}	3
Alt	(United States) Hanna Chang	2	7^{12}	6
WC	(United States) Gabriella Price	3	2
(United Kingdom) Katie Boulter	6	6
(Belgium) Marie Benoît	6	3	4
24	(Russia) Vitalia Diatchenko	4	6	6

Second round
8	(Slovakia) Kristína Kučová	7	7^{7}
Alt	(United States) Hanna Chang	5	6^{5}
(United Kingdom) Katie Boulter	6	5	6
24	(Russia) Vitalia Diatchenko	2	7	4

Qualifying competition
8	(Slovakia) Kristína Kučová	5	6	4
(United Kingdom) Katie Boulter	7	2	6

=== Ninth qualifier ===
First round
9	(Belgium) Maryna Zanevska	6	6
(United States) Asia Muhammad	4	3
(Chinese Taipei) Liang En-shuo	6	6
(Netherlands) Indy de Vroome	3	4
(Italy) Lucia Bronzetti	6	1	4
(Greece) Valentini Grammatikopoulou	3	6	6
(Russia) Natalia Vikhlyantseva	0	2
22	(Russia) Anna Kalinskaya	6	6

Second round
9	(Belgium) Maryna Zanevska	6^{5}	4
(Chinese Taipei) Liang En-shuo	7^{7}	6
(Greece) Valentini Grammatikopoulou	2	6	6
22	(Russia) Anna Kalinskaya	6	4	2

Qualifying competition
(Chinese Taipei) Liang En-shuo	2	7	5
(Greece) Valentini Grammatikopoulou	6	5	7

=== Tenth qualifier ===
First round
10	(Australia) Astra Sharma	7	7^{7}
(Slovakia) Viktória Kužmová	5	6^{5}
(Germany) Tatjana Maria	6	3	4
(Switzerland) Susan Bandecchi	3	6	6
(Luxembourg) Mandy Minella	3	6^{3}
(Russia) Marina Melnikova	6	7^{7}
(Netherlands) Lesley Pattinama Kerkhove	2	2
23	(France) Harmony Tan	6	6

Second round
10	(Australia) Astra Sharma	6	7^{7}
(Switzerland) Susan Bandecchi	4	6^{4}
(Russia) Marina Melnikova	1	1
23	(France) Harmony Tan	6	6

Qualifying competition
10	(Australia) Astra Sharma	5	6	6
23	(France) Harmony Tan	7	4	2

=== Eleventh qualifier ===
First round
11	(Czech Republic) Kristýna Plíšková	6	6
(Russia) Valeria Savinykh	2	1
(Romania) Gabriela Talabă	2	3
(United States) Robin Anderson	6	6
(United States) Usue Maitane Arconada	6	4	6
PR	(Australia) Jaimee Fourlis	4	6	3
(Australia) Lizette Cabrera	6	4	2
20	(Russia) Kamilla Rakhimova	4	6	6

Second round
11	(Czech Republic) Kristýna Plíšková	6^{5}	6	6
(United States) Robin Anderson	7^{7}	4	1
(United States) Usue Maitane Arconada	4	6	1
20	(Russia) Kamilla Rakhimova	6	3	6

Qualifying competition
11	(Czech Republic) Kristýna Plíšková	7^{7}	6
20	(Russia) Kamilla Rakhimova	6^{5}	4

=== Twelfth qualifier ===
First round
12	(Bulgaria) Viktoriya Tomova	6	6
(United States) Grace Min	0	4
(Spain) Irene Burillo Escorihuela	2	3
(Brazil) Beatriz Haddad Maia	6	6
(Georgia (country)) Ekaterine Gorgodze	3	6	0
(Italy) Lucrezia Stefanini	6	3	6
WC	(United States) Peyton Stearns	3	6	3
32	(United Kingdom) Harriet Dart	6	4	6

Second round
12	(Bulgaria) Viktoriya Tomova	4	6	6
(Brazil) Beatriz Haddad Maia	6	3	2
(Italy) Lucrezia Stefanini	6^{1}	6^{5}
32	(United Kingdom) Harriet Dart	7^{7}	7^{7}

Qualifying competition
12	(Bulgaria) Viktoriya Tomova	7^{7}	1	3
32	(United Kingdom) Harriet Dart	6^{1}	6	6

=== Thirteenth qualifier ===
First round
13	(Romania) Irina Bara	4	1
(United States) Caroline Dolehide	6	6
(Spain) Aliona Bolsova	7^{7}	2	1
WC	(United States) Victoria Duval	6^{5}	6	6
(United States) Danielle Lao	3	7^{7}	3
(United States) Sachia Vickery	6	6^{3}	6
(Argentina) Paula Ormaechea	2	5
29	(Serbia) Olga Danilović	6	7

Second round
(United States) Caroline Dolehide	5	6	6
WC	(United States) Victoria Duval	7	4	3
(United States) Sachia Vickery	3	4
29	(Serbia) Olga Danilović	6	6

Qualifying competition
(United States) Caroline Dolehide	4	6	2
29	(Serbia) Olga Danilović	6	0	6

=== Fourteenth qualifier ===
First round
14	(Mexico) Renata Zarazúa	5	6^{3}
(Greece) Despina Papamichail	7	7^{7}
(Hungary) Dalma Gálfi	3	6	6
PR	(United States) Louisa Chirico	6	1	2
(Netherlands) Richèl Hogenkamp	2	6	5
PR	(United Kingdom) Samantha Murray Sharan	6	3	7
(Romania) Monica Niculescu	6	6^{5}	6
28	(Australia) Maddison Inglis	4	7^{7}	2

Second round
(Greece) Despina Papamichail	6^{6}	1
(Hungary) Dalma Gálfi	7^{8}	6
PR	(United Kingdom) Samantha Murray Sharan	4	6	3
(Romania) Monica Niculescu	6	3	6

Qualifying competition
(Hungary) Dalma Gálfi	6	6
(Romania) Monica Niculescu	1	3

=== Fifteenth qualifier ===
First round
15	(Poland) Magdalena Fręch	6	4	3
(Spain) Lara Arruabarrena	3	6	6
(Croatia) Jana Fett	3	6	4
(Spain) Rebeka Masarova	6	2	6
WC	(United States) Elizabeth Mandlik	6	0	3
(United Kingdom) Francesca Jones	3	6	6
(France) Chloé Paquet	6^{3}	5
26	(Romania) Jaqueline Cristian	7^{7}	7

Second round
(Spain) Lara Arruabarrena	5	1
(Spain) Rebeka Masarova	7	6
(United Kingdom) Francesca Jones	4	4
26	(Romania) Jaqueline Cristian	6	6

Qualifying competition
(Spain) Rebeka Masarova	2	6	6
26	(Romania) Jaqueline Cristian	6	2	4

=== Sixteenth qualifier ===
First round
16	(Germany) Anna-Lena Friedsam	6	6
(United States) Allie Kiick	3	0
(India) Ankita Raina	3	6	4
(United States) Jamie Loeb	6	2	6
(Romania) Mihaela Buzărnescu	6	7
(Poland) Katarzyna Kawa	3	5
(Italy) Giulia Gatto-Monticone	2	2
30	(Germany) Jule Niemeier	6	6

Second round
16	(Germany) Anna-Lena Friedsam	3	4
(United States) Jamie Loeb	6	6
(Romania) Mihaela Buzărnescu	6	4	6
30	(Germany) Jule Niemeier	3	6	0

Qualifying competition
(United States) Jamie Loeb	6	7^{7}
(Romania) Mihaela Buzărnescu	4	6^{2}

== See also ==
- 2021 US Open – Men's singles qualifying
