= 2021 Engie Open Andrézieux-Bouthéon 42 – Doubles =

Doubles
- 2021 Engie Open Andrézieux-Bouthéon 42

Final
- Champions: (China) Lu Jiajing (China) You Xiaodi
- Runners-up: (Poland) Paula Kania-Choduń (Ukraine) Katarina Zavatska
- Score: 6–3, 6–4

Events
Singles	Doubles
← 2020 ·	Open Andrézieux-Bouthéon 42	· 2022 →

Jaqueline Cristian and Elena-Gabriela Ruse were the defending champions, but both players chose not to participate.

Lu Jiajing and You Xiaodi won the title, defeating Paula Kania-Choduń and Katarina Zavatska in the final, 6–3, 6–4.

== Seeds ==
1. (Romania) Laura Ioana Paar / (Germany) Julia Wachaczyk (semifinals)
2. (France) Amandine Hesse / (Belgium) Kimberley Zimmermann (first round)
3. (France) Manon Arcangioli / (France) Elixane Lechemia (first round)
4. (Romania) Nicoleta Dascălu / (Hungary) Réka Luca Jani (first round)

== Draw ==
=== Key ===
- Q = Qualifier
- WC = Wild card
- LL = Lucky loser
- Alt = Alternate
- SE = Special exempt
- PR = Protected ranking
- ITF = ITF entry
- JE = Junior exempt
- w/o = Walkover
- r = Retired
- d = Defaulted
- SR = Special ranking

=== Draw ===
First round
1	(Romania) LI Paar (Germany) J Wachaczyk	6	7
(Italy) M Di Giuseppe (Italy) G Gatto-Monticone	4	5
(France) E Mazzoni (France) J Mazzoni	1	3
(Andorra) V Jiménez Kasintseva (Spain) N Párrizas Díaz	6	6
3	(France) M Arcangioli (France) E Lechemia	0	0
(Netherlands) I de Vroome (Switzerland) L Küng	6	6
(China) Jia Lu (China) X You	6	6
WC	(France) N Oliveras (France) E Semenenko	0	0
(Belgium) M Benoît (Spain) C Bucșa	2	6	[11]
(France) D Parry (France) M Yerolymos	6	0	[9]
(Turkey) Ç Büyükakçay (Belgium) L Salden	6	6
4	(Romania) N Dascălu (Hungary) RL Jani	0	3
(Latvia) D Marcinkēviča (Chile) D Seguel	6	2	[10]
(Germany) T Morderger (Germany) Y Morderger	2	6	[5]
(Poland) P Kania-Choduń (Ukraine) K Zavatska	6	6
2	(France) A Hesse (Belgium) K Zimmermann	0	3

Quarterfinals
1	(Romania) LI Paar (Germany) J Wachaczyk	6	6
(Andorra) V Jiménez Kasintseva (Spain) N Párrizas Díaz	1	2
(Netherlands) I de Vroome (Switzerland) L Küng	2	3
(China) Jia Lu (China) X You	6	6
(Belgium) M Benoît (Spain) C Bucșa	1	3
(Turkey) Ç Büyükakçay (Belgium) L Salden	6	6
(Latvia) D Marcinkēviča (Chile) D Seguel	2	3
(Poland) P Kania-Choduń (Ukraine) K Zavatska	6	6

Semifinals
1	(Romania) LI Paar (Germany) J Wachaczyk	4	2
(China) Jia Lu (China) X You	6	6
(Turkey) Ç Büyükakçay (Belgium) L Salden	6^{6}	4
(Poland) P Kania-Choduń (Ukraine) K Zavatska	7^{8}	6

Final
(China) Jia Lu (China) X You	6	6
(Poland) P Kania-Choduń (Ukraine) K Zavatska	3	4
