= 2023 Engie Open Andrézieux-Bouthéon 42 – Doubles =

Doubles
- 2023 Engie Open Andrézieux-Bouthéon 42

Final
- Champions: Sofya Lansere; Oksana Selekhmeteva
- Runners-up: (Switzerland) Conny Perrin; Iryna Shymanovich
- Score: 6–3, 6–0

Events
Singles	Doubles
← 2022 ·	Open Andrézieux-Bouthéon 42	· 2024 →

Estelle Cascino and Jessika Ponchet were the defending champions, but Cascino chose not to participate. Ponchet partnered with Renata Voráčová, but lost to Conny Perrin and Iryna Shymanovich in the semifinals.

Sofya Lansere and Oksana Selekhmeteva won the title, defeating Perrin and Shymanovich in the final, 6–3, 6–0.

== Seeds ==
1. (France) Jessika Ponchet / (Czech Republic) Renata Voráčová (semifinals)
2. Alena Fomina-Klotz / (Brazil) Ingrid Gamarra Martins (quarterfinals)
3. (Switzerland) Conny Perrin / Iryna Shymanovich (final)
4. Sofya Lansere / Oksana Selekhmeteva (champions)

== Draw ==
=== Key ===
- Q = Qualifier
- WC = Wild card
- LL = Lucky loser
- Alt = Alternate
- ITF = ITF entry
- PR = Protected ranking
- SR = Special ranking
- SE = Special exempt
- JE = Junior exempt
- JR = Junior Accelerator Programme entrant
- CO = College Accelerator Programme entrant
- NG = Next Gen Accelerator Program entrant
- w/o = Walkover
- r = Retired
- d = Defaulted

=== Draw ===
First Round
1	(France) J Ponchet (Czech Republic) R Voráčová	6	6
(Romania) I Bara (Romania) A Cadanțu-Ignatik	2	1
(Georgia (country)) S Shapatava (United Kingdom) E Webley-Smith	6	6^{3}	[6]
(Germany) J Jebawy (France) L Wargnier	2	7^{7}	[10]
3	(Switzerland) C Perrin; I Shymanovich	7	6
(France) F Brugnone (France) É Dartron	5	2
(France) J Belgraver (France) L Boisson	6	6
(Czech Republic) A Laboutková (France) V Muntean	2	1
(France) M Szostak (France) A Tubello	3	2
(France) C Noël (France) TS Rakotomanga Rajaonah	6	6
(Croatia) M Dražić (Bosnia and Herzegovina) A Wagner	6^{2}	0
4	S Lansere; O Selekhmeteva	7^{7}	6
K Pavlova (France) A Reguer	6^{3}	4
M Bondarenko; E Kazionova	7^{7}	6
(Netherlands) I Haverlag (Romania) A Mitu	6	3	[5]
2	A Fomina-Klotz (Brazil) I Gamarra Martins	3	6	[10]

Quarterfinals
1	(France) J Ponchet (Czech Republic) R Voráčová	7^{7}	6
(Germany) J Jebawy (France) L Wargnier	6^{5}	1
3	(Switzerland) C Perrin; I Shymanovich	6	6
(France) J Belgraver (France) L Boisson	4	4
(France) C Noël (France) TS Rakotomanga Rajaonah	2	4
4	S Lansere; O Selekhmeteva	6	6
M Bondarenko; E Kazionova	3	6	[10]
2	A Fomina-Klotz (Brazil) I Gamarra Martins	6	2	[5]

Semifinals
1	(France) J Ponchet (Czech Republic) R Voráčová	6^{6}	4
3	(Switzerland) C Perrin; I Shymanovich	7^{8}	6
4	S Lansere; O Selekhmeteva	7^{7}	7
M Bondarenko; E Kazionova	6^{2}	5

Final
3	(Switzerland) C Perrin; I Shymanovich	3	0
4	S Lansere; O Selekhmeteva	6	6
