= NEK Ladies Open =

ITF Women's Tour
- Event name: NEK Ladies Open
- Location: Budapest, Hungary
- Venue: Nemzeti Edzés Központ
- Category: ITF Women's Circuit
- Surface: Clay
- Draw: 32S/32Q/16D
- Prize money: $60,000
- Website: www.hungarianprocircuit.com

The NEK Ladies Open was a tournament for professional female tennis players played on outdoor clay courts. The event was classified as a $60,000 ITF Women's Circuit tournament and was held in Budapest, Hungary, only in 2018. It ran from 27 August until 2 September.

== Singles main draw entrants ==
=== Seeds ===
Country	Player	Rank^{1}	Seed
BUL	Viktoriya Tomova	139	1
BUL	Elitsa Kostova	176	2
GER	Tamara Korpatsch	181	3
ESP	Sílvia Soler Espinosa	190	4
SVK	Jana Čepelová	194	5
SRB	Ivana Jorović	198	6
UKR	Katarina Zavatska	203	7
CRO	Tereza Mrdeža	232	8

- ^{1} Rankings as of 20 August 2018.

=== Other entrants ===
The following players received a wildcard into the singles main draw:

- (Hungary) Anna Bondár
- (Hungary) Dalma Gálfi
- (Hungary) Réka Luca Jani
- (Hungary) Panna Udvardy

The following players received entry from the qualifying draw:

- (Poland) Maja Chwalińska
- (Slovenia) Nina Potočnik
- (Romania) Raluca Georgiana Șerban
- (Romania) Oana Georgeta Simion

The following player received entry as a lucky loser:

- (Romania) Nicoleta Dascălu

== Champions ==
=== Singles ===
- (Poland) Iga Świątek def. (Ukraine) Katarina Zavatska, 6–2, 6–2

=== Doubles ===
- (Norway) Ulrikke Eikeri / (Bulgaria) Elitsa Kostova def. (Hungary) Dalma Gálfi / (Hungary) Réka Luca Jani, 2–6, 6–4, [10–8]
