= Salma Djoubri =

French tennis player

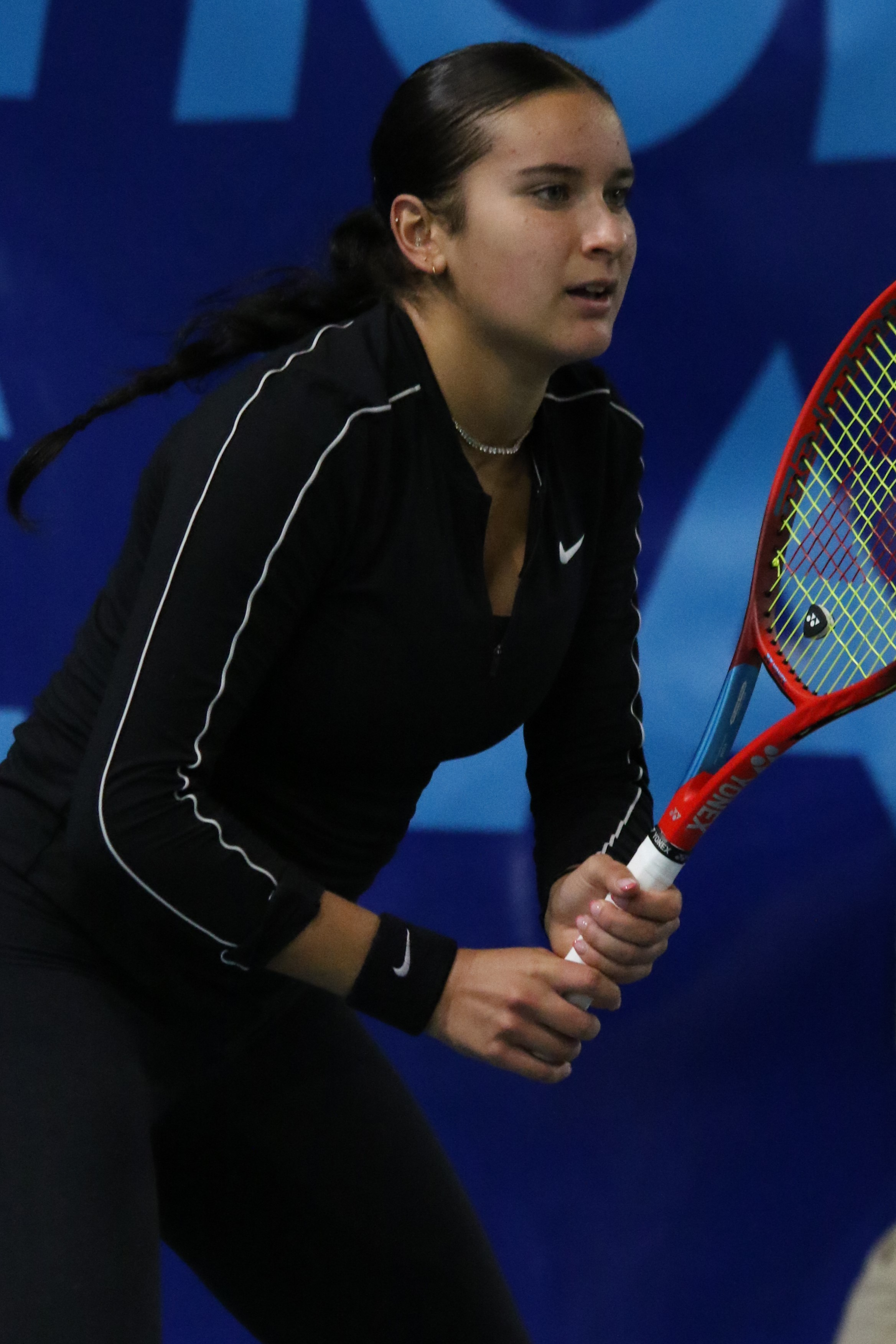
- Djoubri at the 2021 ITF Poitiers
- Country (sports): France
- Born: 20 December 2002 (age 22)
- Plays: Right-handed (two-handed backhand)
- Prize money: US$ 70,025

Singles
- Career record: 116–110
- Career titles: 3 ITF
- Highest ranking: No. 412 (21 March 2022)
- Current ranking: No. 644 (9 January 2023)

Grand Slam singles results
- French Open: Q1 (2021, 2022)

Doubles
- Career record: 5–12
- Career titles: 0
- Highest ranking: No. 885 (18 March 2019)

Grand Slam doubles results
- French Open: 1R (2021)
- Last updated on: 14 January 2023.

Salma Djoubri (born 20 December 2002) is a French tennis player. Djoubri has a career high WTA singles ranking of 412, achieved on 21 March 2022. She also has a career high WTA doubles ranking of 885, achieved on 18 March 2019. Djoubri has won three singles tournaments on the ITF circuit.

== Career ==
She made her start playing tennis as a member of the Saint-Aubin Tennis Club. Coached her father, Karim Djoubri, she was playing professional tennis at the age of 14 years-old.

She won two titles in Monastir, Tunisia in 2021. Match Djoubri made her Grand Slam main-draw debut at the 2021 French Open doubles event, after she was awarded a wildcard partnering with Océane Dodin.

Competing for Lynn University in Florida, United States, Djoubri was ranked by the Intercollegiate Tennis Association (ITA) as NCAA Division II’s No. 1 player throughout the 2023-24 athletic year. Djoubri won the 2023 ITA Cup Women’s Singles Super Bowl and National Championship after defeating Nadja Meier. She was the sole DII player to be selected for the ITA DI Fall National Championships in San Diego that year. During the spring season, Djoubri posted a 17-1 singles record and a perfect 17-0 against DII opponents, all in singles matches. She was one of the Division II Women’s tennis student-athletes who earned ITA All-American honours for the 2023-24 college tennis season.

She continued to feature for the Lynn University tennis team in the spring of 2025.

== Personal life ==
She is from Caudebec-lès-Elbeuf, Normandy, France. She began her freshman year at Lynn University in the United States in 2022.

== ITF Circuit finals ==
=== Singles: 3 (3 titles) ===
Legend $25,000 tournaments $15,000 tournaments	Finals by surface Hard (2–0) Clay (1–0)

Result	W–L	Date	Tournament	Tier	Surface	Opponent	Score
Win	1–0	Sep 2019	ITF Haren, Netherlands	15,000	Clay	(Germany) Sina Herrmann	6–1, 6–0
Win	2–0	Jan 2021	ITF Monastir, Tunisia	15,000	Hard	(India) Zeel Desai	6–4, 3–6, 6–2
Win	3–0	Apr 2021	ITF Monastir, Tunisia	15,000	Hard	(Belgium) Magali Kempen	6–3, 6–4

=== Doubles: 1 (runner–up) ===
Legend $25,000 tournaments $15,000 tournaments	Finals by surface Hard (0–1) Clay (0–0)

Result	Date	Tournament	Tier	Surface	Partner	Opponents	Score
Loss	Jan 2021	ITF Monastir, Tunisia	15,000	Hard	(France) Manon Arcangioli	(Russia) Darya Astakhova (Algeria) Inès Ibbou	3–6, 0–6
