= Harmony Tan =

French tennis player (born 1997)

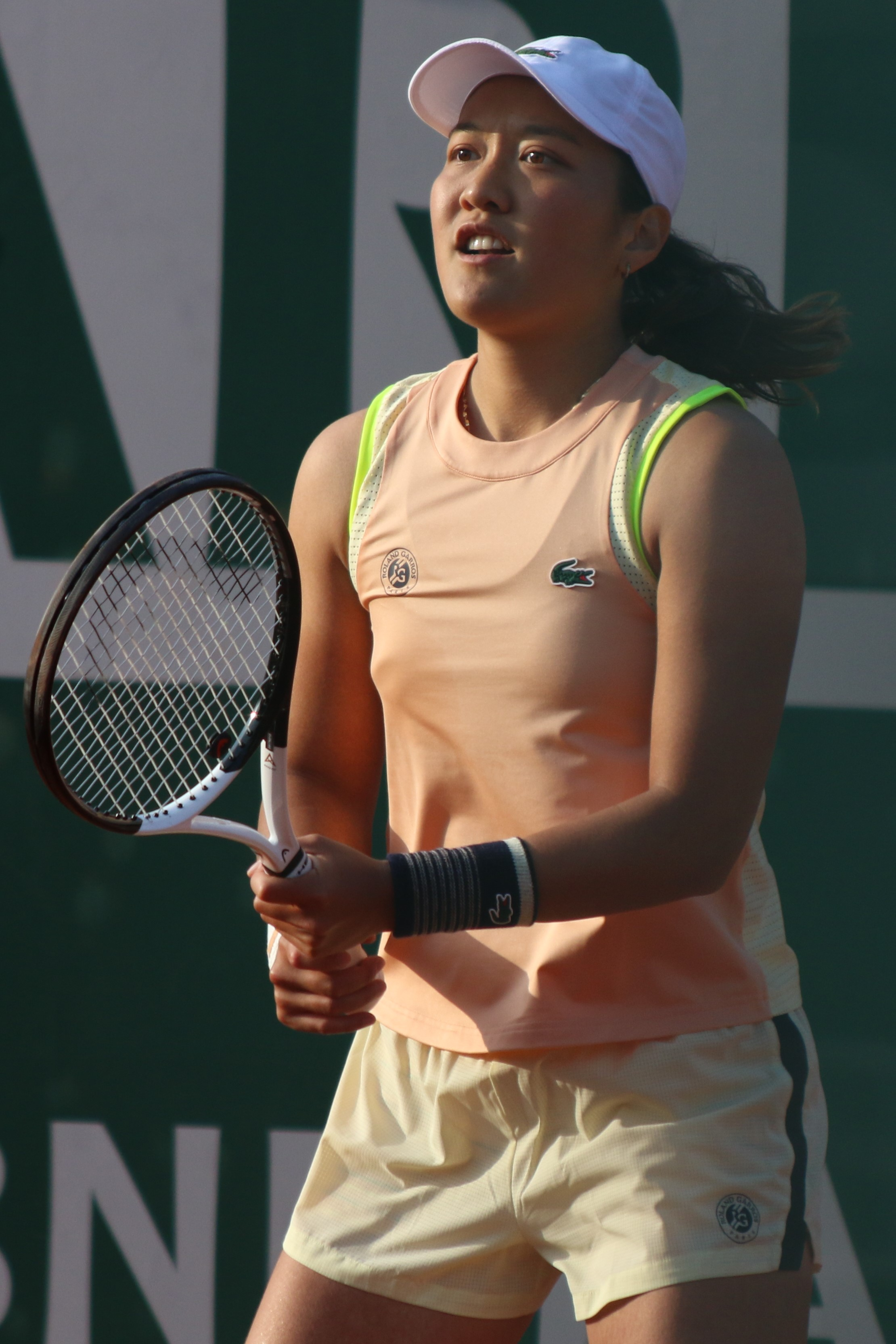
- Tan at the 2023 French Open
- Full name: Harmony Tan Vilela
- Country (sports): France
- Born: 11 September 1997 (age 29) Paris, France
- Height: 1.70 m (5 ft 7 in)
- Turned pro: 2012
- Plays: Right (two-handed backhand)
- Coach: Sam Sumyk (2021-2022), Nathalie Tauziat (-2023), Simon Goffin (2023)
- Prize money: $1,789,606

Singles
- Career record: 405–322
- Career titles: 14 ITF
- Highest ranking: No. 90 (4 April 2022)
- Current ranking: No. 198 (9 November 2026)

Grand Slam singles results
- Australian Open: 2R (2022)
- French Open: 2R (2021)
- Wimbledon: 4R (2022)
- US Open: 1R (2018, 2022)

Doubles
- Career record: 36–53
- Career titles: 1 ITF
- Highest ranking: No. 302 (14 September 2020)

Grand Slam doubles results
- French Open: 1R (2017, 2020, 2021, 2022, 2024, 2025)

Grand Slam mixed doubles results
- French Open: 1R (2022, 2026)
- Last updated on: 15 November 2026.

Harmony Tan Vilela (née Tan; born 11 September 1997) is a French professional tennis player. Tan has career-high WTA rankings of 90 in singles and 302 in doubles. She has won 14 singles titles and one doubles title on the ITF World Tour.

== Early life ==
Harmony Tan was born 1997 in Paris, France. Her father, Chai-Se Tan, is of Chinese descent and was born in Cambodia, while her mother, Lizqueen, was born in Vietnam and moved to France after the Fall of Saigon in 1975. Her father worked as a computer engineer, and her mother as a journalist. She has a brother, Maxime, who also played tennis.

Tan began playing tennis at the age of four alongside her brother. She initially trained in Neuilly-sur-Marne before being recruited by a tennis club in Nogent-sur-Marne. At the age of eight, she attended a training camp at Nick Bollettieri's tennis academy in Florida. Two years later, she also trained in Switzerland under Melanie Molitor, the mother and former coach of Martina Hingis.

Outside tennis, Tan practiced gymnastics, judo and golf, and studied classical piano at a conservatory for several years. She pursued her tennis development outside the French tennis federation's national training system, with financial support from her family, including the sale of a house to fund her training. She completed a scientific baccalaureate and qualified for the admissions process of a programme for elite athletes at Sciences Po, but did not attend classes as her professional tennis career progressed.

== Personal life ==
Tan married her longtime partner, Pauline Vilela, on 12 September 2026.

== Career ==
=== Early years ===
Tan made her major main-draw doubles debut at the 2017 French Open, after having been handed a wildcard to enter the tournament; she and her partner Audrey Albié lost their first-round match to the unseeded pair of Pauline Parmentier and Yanina Wickmayer.

Tan made her major singles debut at the 2018 US Open, where she entered the main draw on a wildcard, losing her first-round match to Eugenie Bouchard.

Tan made her singles main-draw debut on the WTA Challenger Tour in January 2019 in Newport Beach, where she won her first- and second-round matches (against Katharina Gerlach and Sachia Vickery, respectively), before losing to Taylor Townsend. In May 2019, Tan entered a WTA Tour singles main draw for the first time in her career in Strasbourg thanks to a wildcard, but lost her first-round match to No. 7 seed Zheng Saisai, 6–7, 6–7.

=== Win over Serena Williams ===
In 2022, at her first Wimbledon showing, ranked No. 115, Tan defeated Serena Williams in three sets (10–7 in third-set tiebreak) in the first round in 3 hours and 10 minutes, the longest match thus far at the tournament. She was scheduled to participate in the women's doubles competition that year but withdrew only an hour before her first scheduled match, prompting her doubles partner Tamara Korpatsch to express, in a since-deleted social media post, her anger and disappointment at not being able to participate in the event on her debut. She continued her good run by beating Sara Sorribes Tormo in the second round, and home favorite Katie Boulter in the third. Her run came to an end in the fourth round when she fell to 20th seed Amanda Anisimova, in straight sets.

In March 2024, she won the title at the W50 tournament in Mâcon and returned to the top 250 in the rankings.

== Performance timelines ==
Key
| W | F | SF | QF | #R | RR | Q# | DNQ | A | NH |

(W) winner; (F) finalist; (SF) semifinalist; (QF) quarterfinalist; (#R) rounds 4, 3, 2, 1; (RR) round-robin stage; (Q#) qualification round; (DNQ) did not qualify; (A) absent; (NH) not held; (SR) strike rate (events won / competed); (W–L) win–loss record.
To avoid confusion and double counting, these charts are updated at the conclusion of a tournament or when the player's participation has ended.

Only main-draw results in WTA Tour, Grand Slam tournaments, BJK Cup, and Olympic Games are included in win/loss records.

=== Singles ===
Current through the 2026 WTA Tour.

| Tournament | 2015 | 2016 | 2017 | 2018 | 2019 | 2020 | 2021 | 2022 | 2023 | 2024 | 2025 | 2026 | SR | W–L |
|---|---|---|---|---|---|---|---|---|---|---|---|---|---|---|
Grand Slam tournaments
| Australian Open | A | A | A | A | A | A | Q3 | 2R | Q1 | Q1 | A | Q2 | 0 / 1 | 1–1 |
| French Open | Q1 | A | Q1 | Q3 | 1R | 1R | 2R | 1R | Q1 | Q2 | A | Q3 | 0 / 4 | 1–4 |
| Wimbledon | A | A | A | A | A | NH | Q2 | 4R | A | Q2 | A | Q3 | 0 / 1 | 3–1 |
| US Open | A | A | A | 1R | Q1 | A | Q3 | 1R | Q1 | Q1 | A | Q1 | 0 / 2 | 0–2 |
| Win–Loss | 0–0 | 0–0 | 0–0 | 0–1 | 0–1 | 0–1 | 1–1 | 4–4 | 0–0 | 0–0 | 0–0 | 0–0 | 0 / 8 | 5–8 |
WTA 1000
| Indian Wells Open | A | A | A | A | A | NH | A | 1R | A | A | A | A | 0 / 1 | 0–1 |
| Miami Open | A | A | A | A | A | NH | A | 2R | A | A | A | A | 0 / 1 | 0–1 |
| Madrid Open | A | A | A | A | A | NH | A | Q2 | A | A | A | A | 0 / 0 | 0–0 |
| Italian Open | A | A | A | A | A | A | A | A | A | A | A | A | 0 / 0 | 0–0 |
| Canadian Open | A | A | A | A | A | NH | Q1 | A | A | A | A | A | 0 / 0 | 0–0 |
Career statistics
| Tournaments | 0 | 0 | 0 | 1 | 3 | 2 | 6 | 13 | 1 | 0 | 0 | 0 | Career total: 26 | |
| Overall win–loss | 0–0 | 0–0 | 0–0 | 0–1 | 0–3 | 0–2 | 5–6 | 4–14 | 0–1 | 0–0 | 0–0 | 0–0 | 0 / 26 | 9–27 |
| Year-end ranking | 559 | 400 | 366 | 314 | 247 | 233 | 108 | 147 | 234 | 259 | 238 | | $1,789,606 | |

== ITF Circuit finals ==
=== Singles: 25 (14 titles, 11 runner-ups) ===
| Legend W60 tournaments W40/50 tournaments W25/35 tournaments W10/15 tournaments | Finals by surface Hard (9–8) Clay (4–3) Carpet (1–0) |

| Result | W–L | Date | Tournament | Tier | Surface | Opponent | Score |
|---|---|---|---|---|---|---|---|
| Loss | 0–1 | Feb 2014 | ITF Mâcon, France | 10k | Hard (i) | (Netherlands) Eva Wacanno | 1–6, 6–7^{(4–7)} |
| Loss | 0–2 | Aug 2014 | ITF Caracas, Venezuela | 25k | Hard | (Argentina) María Irigoyen | 1–6, 3–6 |
| Loss | 0–3 | Sep 2014 | ITF Tlemcen, Algeria | 10k | Clay | (Russia) Margarita Lazareva | 6–7^{(3–7)}, 2–6 |
| Win | 1–3 | Sep 2015 | ITF Algiers, Algeria | 10k | Clay | (France) Amandine Cazeaux | 7–5, 7–5 |
| Loss | 1–4 | Apr 2016 | ITF Lins, Brazil | 10k | Clay | (Argentina) Paula Ormaechea | 3–6, 2–6 |
| Win | 2–4 | Aug 2016 | ITF Medellín, Colombia | 10k | Clay | (Chile) Fernanda Brito | 6–2, 7–5 |
| Loss | 2–5 | Aug 2016 | ITF Cali, Colombia | 10k | Clay | (Russia) Sofya Zhuk | 2–6, 4–6 |
| Win | 3–5 | Oct 2016 | ITF Melilla, Spain | 10k | Clay | (Spain) María José Luque Moreno | 7–6^{(7–4)}, 6–4 |
| Win | 4–5 | Mar 2017 | ITF Óbidos, Portugal | 15k | Carpet | (Spain) María José Luque Moreno | 6–3, 6–7^{(5–7)}, 6–3 |
| Win | 5–5 | Mar 2018 | ITF Campinas, Brazil | 15k | Clay | (France) Alice Ramé | 6–2, 6–0 |
| Win | 6–5 | Oct 2018 | ITF Cherbourg-en-Cotentin, France | 25k | Hard (i) | (France) Loudmilla Bencheikh | 7–6^{(7–5)}, 6–3 |
| Loss | 6–6 | Feb 2019 | Open de l'Isère, France | W25 | Hard (i) | (Russia) Vitalia Diatchenko | 1–6, 4–6 |
| Loss | 6–7 | Oct 2019 | ITF Cherbourg, France | W25 | Hard (i) | (France) Océane Dodin | 4–6, 2–6 |
| Loss | 6–8 | Jan 2020 | ITF Petit-Bourg, Guadeloupe | W25 | Hard | (Argentina) Nadia Podoroska | 5–7, 5–7 |
| Win | 7–8 | Jan 2021 | Open Andrézieux-Bouthéon, France | W60 | Hard (i) | (Romania) Jaqueline Cristian | 3–6, 6–2, 6–1 |
| Loss | 7–9 | Sep 2021 | Caldas da Rainha Open, Portugal | W60+H | Hard | (China) Zheng Saisai | 4–6, 6–3, 3–6 |
| Win | 8–9 | Oct 2021 | ITF Loulé, Portugal | W25 | Hard | (Australia) Ellen Perez | 6–4, 6–4 |
| Loss | 8–10 | Jul 2023 | ITF Palma del Río, Spain | W40 | Hard | (Russia) Valeria Savinykh | 5–7, 3–6 |
| Win | 9–10 | Oct 2023 | ITF Faro, Portugal | W25 | Hard | (France) Manon Léonard | 6–0, 6–2 |
| Win | 10–10 | Mar 2024 | ITF Mâcon, France | W50 | Hard (i) | (France) Audrey Albié | 6–2, 6–0 |
| Win | 11–10 | Apr 2025 | ITF Yecla, Spain | W50 | Hard | (Ukraine) Daria Snigur | 3–6, 6–3, 6–1 |
| Loss | 11–11 | Jul 2025 | ITF Nottingham, United Kingdom | W50 | Hard | (China) Zhang Shuai | 4–6, 2–6 |
| Win | 12–11 | Nov 2025 | ITF Liberec, Czech Republic | W35 | Hard (i) | (Japan) Mayuka Aikawa | 6–2, 6–1 |
| Win | 13–11 | Mar 2026 | Open de Seine-et-Marne, France | W50 | Hard (i) | (France) Amandine Monnot | 6–3, 6–4 |
| Win | 14–11 | Oct 2026 | ITF Cherbourg-en-Cotentin, France | W50 | Hard (i) | (Ukraine) Katarina Zavatska | 6–2, 7–6^{(3)} |

=== Doubles: 2 (1 title, 1 runner-up) ===
| Legend W80 tournaments W25 tournaments | Finals by surface Hard (1–0) Clay (0–1) |

| Result | W–L | Date | Tournament | Tier | Surface | Partner | Opponents | Score |
|---|---|---|---|---|---|---|---|---|
| Loss | 0–1 | Feb 2018 | ITF Curitiba, Brazil | W25 | Clay | (France) Audrey Albié | (Chinese Taipei) Hsu Chieh-yu (Mexico) Marcela Zacarías | 0–6, 3–6 |
| Win | 1–1 | Oct 2019 | Internationaux de Poitiers, France | W80 | Hard (i) | (France) Amandine Hesse | (Germany) Tayisiya Morderger (Germany) Yana Morderger | 6–4, 6–2 |
