= Katarina Zavatska =

Ukrainian tennis player (born 2000)

Katarina Zavatska Катаріна Завацька
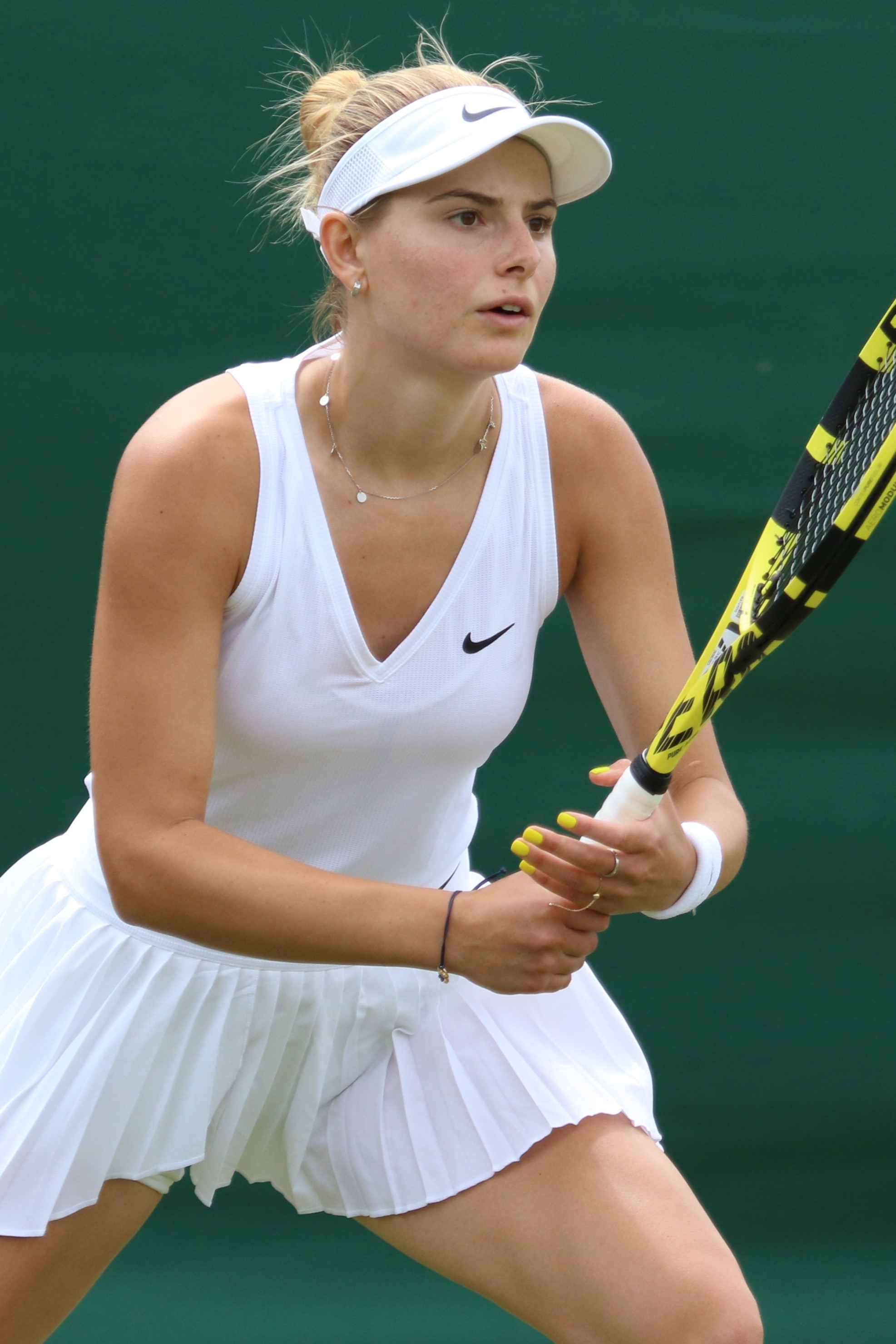
- Zavatska at the 2023 Wimbledon Championships
- Full name: Katarina Vitaliivna Zavatska
- Country (sports): Ukraine
- Born: 5 February 2000 (age 26) Lutsk, Ukraine
- Height: 1.73 m (5 ft 8 in)
- Plays: Right (two-handed backhand)
- Coach: Illya Marchenko
- Prize money: US$ 1,093,742

Singles
- Career record: 326–231
- Career titles: 11 ITF
- Highest ranking: No. 103 (3 February 2020)
- Current ranking: No. 266 (28 September 2026)

Grand Slam singles results
- Australian Open: Q2 (2020, 2021, 2023, 2024)
- French Open: 1R (2020, 2021)
- Wimbledon: Q3 (2022)
- US Open: 1R (2020)

Doubles
- Career record: 41–40
- Career titles: 2 ITF
- Highest ranking: No. 337 (14 June 2021)
- Current ranking: No. 1,073 (28 September 2026)

Grand Slam doubles results
- French Open: 1R (2020)

Team competitions
- Fed Cup: 7–5
- Last updated on: 7 October 2026.

Katarina Vitaliivna Zavatska (Ukrainian: Катаріна Віталіївна Завацька; born 5 February 2000) is a Ukrainian tennis player. Zavatska has a career-high singles ranking of world No. 103, achieved on 3 February 2020, and a best in doubles of 337, reached on 14 June 2021. She has won eleven singles titles and two doubles titles on the ITF Circuit.

== Career ==
=== Juniors ===
On the ITF Junior Circuit, Zavatska had a career-high ranking of No. 13, achieved on 18 July 2016. She reached the quarterfinals of the 2016 French Open girls' singles, losing to eventual champion Rebeka Masarova.

=== Professional ===
Zavatska made her WTA Tour main-draw debut at the 2017 Malaysian Open, where she was given a wildcard but lost in the first round to Magda Linette.

She won her first WTA Tour match at the 2018 Morocco Open, where she beat wildcard Diae El Jardi in straight sets. She went on to win her second-round match in three sets against Alexandra Dulgheru.

Zavatska made her Grand Slam tournament main-draw debut at the 2020 US Open, losing to 11th seed Elena Rybakina in straight sets.

At the 2020 French Open, which had been moved to September due to the COVID-19 pandemic, she lost in the first round to fifth seed Kiki Bertens in a match that went to a deciding set, during which she ran out of rackets due to broken strings and had to borrow one from her coach.

Zavatska qualified for the 2021 French Open, but went out in the opening round to 17th seed Maria Sakkari.

At the 2024 Swedish Open, Zavatska reached the quarterfinals with wins over Yuliia Starodubtseva and fourth seed Anna Karolína Schmiedlová, before losing to Louisa Chirico.

Partnering with Tara Würth, she was runner-up in the doubles at the 2024 WTA 125 Cali Open, losing to top seeds Veronika Erjavec and Kristina Mladenovic in the final.

In Ukraine's 2024 Billie Jean King Cup play-offs tie against Austria, Zavatska defeated Julia Grabher to square the contest at 2–2, before partnering with Nadiia Kichenok to overcome Sinja Kraus and Tamira Paszek in the deciding doubles match.

== Performance timeline ==
Key
W	F	SF	QF	#R	RR	Q#	DNQ	A	NH

(W) winner; (F) finalist; (SF) semifinalist; (QF) quarterfinalist; (#R) rounds 4, 3, 2, 1; (RR) round-robin stage; (Q#) qualification round; (DNQ) did not qualify; (A) absent; (NH) not held; (SR) strike rate (events won / competed); (W–L) win–loss record.
To avoid confusion and double counting, these charts are updated at the conclusion of a tournament or when the player's participation has ended.

Only main-draw results in WTA Tour, Grand Slam tournaments, Fed Cup/Billie Jean King Cup and Olympic Games are included in win–loss records.

=== Singles ===
Current through the 2025 WTA Tour.

Tournament	2017	2018	2019	2020	2021	2022	2023	2024	2025	2026	SR	W–L
Grand Slam tournaments
Australian Open	A	A	Q1	Q2	Q2	A	Q2	Q2	A	A	0 / 0	0–0
French Open	A	A	Q3	1R	1R	Q2	A	Q1	A	Q3	0 / 2	0–2
Wimbledon	A	A	Q1	NH	Q1	Q3	Q1	Q2	A	A	0 / 0	0–0
US Open	A	Q1	Q2	1R	Q1	Q1	Q1	Q1	A	A	0 / 1	0–1
Win–loss	0–0	0–0	0–0	0–2	0–1	0–0	0–0	0–0	0–0	0–0	0 / 3	0–3
WTA 1000
Dubai / Qatar Open (Note: The first Premier 5 event of the year has switched back and forth between the Dubai Tennis Championships and the Qatar Ladies Open since 2009. Dubai was classified as a Premier 5 event from 2009 to 2011 before being succeeded by Doha for the 2012–2014 period. In 2015, Dubai regained its Premier 5 status while Doha was demoted to Premier status. The Premier 5 tournaments were reclassified as WTA 1000 tournaments in 2021.)	A	A	A	A	1R	A	1R	A	A	A	0 / 2	0–2
Indian Wells Open					A	A	Q1	A	A	A	0 / 0	0–0
Miami Open	A	A	A	NH	A	Q1	A	A	A	A	0 / 0	0–0
Cincinnati Open	A	A	A	Q1	A	A	A	A	A	A	0 / 0	0–0
Career statistics
Tournaments	2	1	4	5	4	1	1	0	0	0	Career total: 16	
Titles	0	0	0	0	0	0	0	0	0	0	Career total: 0	
Finals	0	0	0	0	0	0	0	0	0	0	Career total: 0	
Hard win–loss	0–2	0–0	4–3	0–3	0–3	1–1	0–3	0–0	0–0	0–0	0 / 12	5–15
Clay win–loss	0–0	2–1	0–1	0–2	0–1	1–1	0–0	0–0	0–0	0–0	0 / 6	3–6
Grass win–loss	0–0	0–0	0–0	0–0	0–0	0–0	0–0	0–0	0–0	0–0	0 / 0	0–0
Overall win–loss	0–2	2–1	4–4	0–5	0–4	2–2	0–3	0–0	0–0	0–0	0 / 18	8–21
Year-end ranking (Note: 2015: WTA ranking – 636, 2016: WTA ranking – 583.)	231	193	110	118	188	339	154	229	360		$1,093,742	

== ITF Circuit finals ==
=== Singles: 21 (11 titles, 10 runner-ups) ===
Legend W100 tournaments (1–0) W60/75 tournaments (2–5) W40/50 tournaments (1–1) W25/35 tournaments (4–3) $10/15k tournaments (3–1)	Finals by surface Hard (2–2) Clay (9–8)

Result	W–L	Date	Tournament	Tier	Surface	Opponent	Score
Win	1–0	Jun 2015	Telavi Open, Georgia	10k	Clay	(France) Julie Razafindranaly	6–1, 7–5
Win	2–0	Aug 2015	ITF Sharm El Sheikh, Egypt	10k	Hard	(Egypt) Ola Abou Zekry	2–6, 6–2, 6–3
Loss	2–1	Oct 2016	ITF Pula, Italy	10k	Clay	(Hungary) Vanda Lukács	6–0, 1–6, 2–6
Win	3–1	Mar 2017	ITF Pula, Italy	25k	Clay	(France) Chloé Paquet	6–1, 6–3
Loss	3–2	Sep 2017	Ladies Open Dunakeszi, Hungary	60k	Clay	(Ukraine) Dayana Yastremska	0–6, 1–6
Win	4–2	Mar 2018	ITF Amiens, France	15k	Clay (i)	(Luxembourg) Eléonora Molinaro	6–1, 6–2
Loss	4–3	Apr 2018	Wiesbaden Open, Germany	25k	Clay	(Liechtenstein) Kathinka von Deichmann	3–6, 2–6
Loss	4–4	Sep 2018	Budapest Ladies Open, Hungary	60k	Clay	(Poland) Iga Świątek	2–6, 2–6
Loss	4–5	Sep 2018	Open de Saint-Malo, France	60k+H	Clay	(Russia) Liudmila Samsonova	0–6, 2–6
Loss	4–6	Apr 2019	Wiesbaden Open, Germany	W60	Clay	(Czech Republic) Barbora Krejčíková	4–6, 6–7^{(2)}
Win	5–6	Jul 2019	Internazionale di Biella, Italy	W25	Clay	(Egypt) Mayar Sherif	6–1, 6–3
Win	6–6	Jul 2019	Contrexéville Open, France	W100	Clay	(Norway) Ulrikke Eikeri	6–4, 6–4
Loss	6–7	Oct 2022	ITF Loulé, Portugal	W25	Hard	(Andorra) Victoria Jiménez Kasintseva	1–6, 4–6
Loss	6–8	Apr 2023	ITF Pula, Italy	W25	Clay	(France) Sara Cakarevic	2–6, 4–6
Win	7–8	Jun 2023	Internazionali di Brescia, Italy	W60	Clay	(Belarus) Yuliya Hatouka	6–4, 6–2
Win	8–8	Oct 2023	Lisboa Belém Open, Portugal	W40	Clay	(Bulgaria) Gergana Topalova	6–3, 2–6, 7–5
Win	9–8	Jun 2024	Internazionale di Brescia, Italy	W75	Clay	(United States) Varvara Lepchenko	6–2, 6–3
Loss	9–9	Apr 2025	Chiasso Open, Switzerland	W75	Clay	(Austria) Julia Grabher	1–6, 2–6
Win	10–9	Oct 2025	ITF Qiandaohu, China	W35	Hard	(Russia) Ekaterina Reyngold	7–5, 3–6, 6–2
Win	11–9	Mar 2026	ITF Sabadell, Spain	W35	Clay	(Greece) Martha Matoula	6–3, 6–0
Loss	11–10	Oct 2026	ITF Cherbourg-en-Cotentin, France	W50	Hard (i)	(France) Harmony Tan	2–6, 6–7^{(3)}

=== Doubles: 3 (2 titles, 1 runner-up) ===
Legend W60 tournaments (2–1) W35 tournaments	Finals by surface Hard (0–1) Clay (2–0)

Result	W–L	Date	Tournament	Tier	Surface	Partner	Opponents	Score
Loss	0–1	Jan 2021	Open Andrézieux-Bouthéon, France	W60	Hard (i)	(Poland) Paula Kania-Choduń	(China) Lu Jiajing (China) You Xiaodi	3–6, 4–6
Win	1–1	Apr 2022	Zagreb Ladies Open, Croatia	W60	Clay	(Czech Republic) Anastasia Dețiuc	(Russia) Irina Khromacheva (North Macedonia) Lina Gjorcheska	6–4, 6–7^{(5)}, [11–9]
Win	2–1	Oct 2022	San Sebastián Open, Spain	W60	Clay	(Spain) Aliona Bolsova	(Spain) Ángela Fita Boluda (Spain) Guiomar Maristany	1–2 ret.

== Head to head ==
=== Record against top-10 players ===
Active players are in boldface.

Player	Record	Win%	Hard	Clay	Grass	Last match
No. 1 ranked players						
**(Czech Republic) Karolína Plíšková**	0–1	0%	-	0–1	–	Lost (7–5, 5–7, 4–6) at 2022 Charleston
**(Poland) Iga Świątek**	0–2	0%	–	0–2	–	Lost (3–6, 0–6) at 2019 Lugano
No. 2 ranked players						
**(Spain) Paula Badosa**	1–1	50%	–	1–1	–	Lost (1–6, 2–6) at 2020 Istanbul
**(Russia) Vera Zvonareva**	0–1	0%	0-1	-	–	Lost (4–6, 1–6) at 2020 ITF Istanbul
**(Czech Republic) Barbora Krejčíková**	0–1	0%	–	0–1	–	Lost (4–6, 6–7^{(2)}) at 2019 Wiesbaden
No. 3 ranked players						
**(Greece) Maria Sakkari**	0–1	0%	-	0–1	–	Lost (4–6, 1–6) at 2021 French Open
No. 4 ranked players						
**(Canada) Bianca Andreescu**	1–0	100%	–	1–0	–	Won (6–4, 7–6^{(7)}) at 2017 ITF Pula
(Netherlands) Kiki Bertens	0–1	0%	–	0–1	–	Lost (6–2, 2–6, 0–6) at 2020 French Open
**(United States) Sofia Kenin**	0–1	0%	0–1	–	–	Lost (4–6, 2–6) at 2019 Guangzhou
No. 5 ranked players						
**(Italy) Sara Errani**	1–0	100%	1–0	–	–	Won (6–2, 6–2) at 2019 Guangzhou
**(Latvia) Jeļena Ostapenko**	1–0	100%	1–0	–	–	Won (6–3, 5–4 ret.) at 2019 Tashkent
No. 7 ranked players						
(Switzerland) Patty Schnyder	1–0	100%	–	1–0	–	Won (0–6, 6–4, 6–2) at 2018 Saint-Gaudens
**(United States) Jessica Pegula**	0–1	0%	0–1	–	–	Lost (2–6, 1–6) at 2022 King Cup
No. 9 ranked players						
(Switzerland) Timea Bacsinszky	0–1	0%	–	0–1	–	Lost (5–7, 6–3, 6–2) at 2018 Biarritz
**Total**	**5–11**		**2–3**	**3–8**	**0–0**	**last updated 2022**
