= Open Andrézieux-Bouthéon 42 =

Engie Open Andrézieux-Bouthéon 42
- 2026 Engie Open Andrézieux-Bouthéon 42

ITF Women's Tour
- Event name: Engie Open Andrézieux-Bouthéon 42 (2017–present); Open Engie Métropole 42 (2016); Open GDF Suez 42 (2011–2015)
- Location: Andrézieux-Bouthéon, France
- Venue: Palais des Sports d'Andrézieux-Bouthéon
- Category: ITF Women's Circuit
- Surface: Hard (indoor)
- Draw: 32S/32Q/16D
- Prize money: $60,000
- Website: Official website

The Engie Open Andrézieux-Bouthéon 42 is a tournament for professional female tennis players, played on indoor hard courts. The event is classified as a $60,000 ITF Women's Circuit tournament and has been held annually in Andrézieux-Bouthéon, France, since 2011.

== Past finals ==
=== Singles ===
Year	Champion	Runner-up	Score
2026	Julia Avdeeva	(Ukraine) Veronika Podrez	6–3, 7–5
2025	(France) Manon Léonard	(France) Elsa Jacquemot	1–6, 6–3, 6–4
2024	(United Kingdom) Lily Miyazaki	(France) Jessika Ponchet	3–6, 6–4, 6–1
2023	(France) Océane Dodin	(France) Audrey Albié	3–6, 6–2, 7–5
2022	(Romania) Ana Bogdan	(Russia) Anna Blinkova	7–5, 6–3
2021	(France) Harmony Tan	(Romania) Jaqueline Cristian	3–6, 6–2, 6–1
2020	(Belgium) Ysaline Bonaventure	(Netherlands) Arantxa Rus	6–4, 7–6^{(7–3)}
2019	(Slovakia) Rebecca Šramková	(France) Audrey Albié	6–2, 6–7^{(4–7)}, 6–2
2018	(Spain) Georgina García Pérez	(Netherlands) Arantxa Rus	6–2, 6–0
2017	(Estonia) Anett Kontaveit	(Serbia) Ivana Jorović	6–4, 7–6^{(7–5)}
2016	(Switzerland) Stefanie Vögele	(Belgium) An-Sophie Mestach	6–1, 6–2
2015	(Russia) Margarita Gasparyan	(Bulgaria) Elitsa Kostova	6–4, 6–4
2014	(Switzerland) Timea Bacsinszky	(Belgium) Ysaline Bonaventure	6–1, 6–1
2013	(Belgium) Alison Van Uytvanck	(Croatia) Ana Vrljić	6–1, 6–4
2012	(Czech Republic) Kristýna Plíšková	(Italy) Anna Remondina	6–2, 6–2
2011	(Germany) Mona Barthel	(Liechtenstein) Stephanie Vogt	6–3, 3–6, 6–4

=== Doubles ===
Year	Champions	Runners-up	Score
2026	(France) Julie Belgraver (Belgium) Lara Salden	(Chinese Taipei) Li Yu-yun (China) Li Zongyu	6–4, 3–6, [10–5]
2025	(Turkey) Ayla Aksu; Yuliya Hatouka	(Switzerland) Conny Perrin (Netherlands) Lian Tran	5–7, 6–4, [14–12]
2024	Alevtina Ibragimova; Ekaterina Ovcharenko	(United Kingdom) Emily Appleton (United Kingdom) Freya Christie	3–6, 6–3, [10–5]
2023	Sofya Lansere; Oksana Selekhmeteva	(Switzerland) Conny Perrin; Iryna Shymanovich	6–3, 6–0
2022	(France) Estelle Cascino (France) Jessika Ponchet	(United Kingdom) Alicia Barnett (United Kingdom) Olivia Nicholls	6–4, 6–1
2021	(China) Lu Jiajing (China) You Xiaodi	(Poland) Paula Kania-Choduń (Ukraine) Katarina Zavatska	6–3, 6–4
2020	(Romania) Jaqueline Cristian (Romania) Elena-Gabriela Ruse	(Georgia (country)) Ekaterine Gorgodze (Cyprus) Raluca Șerban	7–6^{(8–6)}, 6–7^{(4–7)}, [10–8]
2019	(Sweden) Cornelia Lister (Czech Republic) Renata Voráčová	(Romania) Andreea Mitu (Romania) Elena-Gabriela Ruse	6–1, 6–2
2018	(Belgium) Ysaline Bonaventure (Netherlands) Bibiane Schoofs	(Italy) Camilla Rosatello (Belgium) Kimberley Zimmermann	4–6, 7–5, [10–7]
2017	(Germany) Nicola Geuer (Germany) Anna Zaja	(Romania) Ana Bogdan (Romania) Ioana Loredana Roșca	6–3, 2–2 ret.
2016	(Belgium) Elise Mertens (Belgium) An-Sophie Mestach	(Switzerland) Viktorija Golubic (Switzerland) Xenia Knoll	6–4, 3–6, [10–7]
2015	(Italy) Gioia Barbieri (Latvia) Jeļena Ostapenko	(Netherlands) Lesley Kerkhove (Croatia) Ana Vrljić	2–6, 7–6^{(7–4)}, [10–3]
2014	(Ukraine) Yuliya Beygelzimer (Ukraine) Kateryna Kozlova	(Switzerland) Timea Bacsinszky (Germany) Kristina Barrois	6–3, 3–6, [10–8]
2013	(Switzerland) Amra Sadiković (Croatia) Ana Vrljić	(Russia) Margarita Gasparyan (Ukraine) Olga Savchuk	5–7, 7–5, [10–4]
2012	(Czech Republic) Karolína Plíšková (Czech Republic) Kristýna Plíšková	(France) Julie Coin (Czech Republic) Eva Hrdinová	6–4, 4–6, [10–5]
2011	(Croatia) Darija Jurak (Russia) Valeria Savinykh	(Netherlands) Kiki Bertens (Netherlands) Richèl Hogenkamp	6–3, 7–6^{(7–0)}
