= 2017 Al Habtoor Tennis Challenge =

- Date: 11–17 December
- Edition: 20th
- Category: ITF Women's Circuit
- Prize money: $100,000+H
- Surface: Hard
- Location: Dubai, United Arab Emirates

Champions

Singles
- (Switzerland) Belinda Bencic

Doubles
- (Romania) Mihaela Buzărnescu / (Russia) Alena Fomina
← 2016 ·	Al Habtoor Tennis Challenge	· 2018 →

The 2017 Al Habtoor Tennis Challenge was a professional tennis tournament played on outdoor hard courts. It was the twentieth edition of the tournament and was part of the 2017 ITF Women's Circuit. It took place in Dubai, United Arab Emirates, on 11–17 December 2017.

== Singles main draw entrants ==
=== Seeds ===
Country	Player	Rank^{1}	Seed
HUN	Tímea Babos	56	1
ROU	Mihaela Buzărnescu	59	2
TPE	Hsieh Su-wei	83	3
UKR	Kateryna Kozlova	87	4
SUI	Belinda Bencic	98	5
SVK	Jana Čepelová	109	6
CRO	Ajla Tomljanović	130	7
BLR	Vera Lapko	134	8

- ^{1} Rankings as of 4 December 2017.

=== Other entrants ===
The following players received a wildcard into the singles main draw:

- (Hungary) Dalma Gálfi
- (Sweden) Cornelia Lister
- (Japan) Ayumi Morita
- (Russia) Anastasia Potapova

The following players received entry from the qualifying draw:

- (France) Fiona Ferro
- (Slovenia) Dalila Jakupović
- (Netherlands) Michaëlla Krajicek
- (Hungary) Fanny Stollár

== Champions ==
=== Singles ===
- (Switzerland) Belinda Bencic def. (Croatia) Ajla Tomljanović, 6–4, 0–0 ret.

=== Doubles ===
- (Romania) Mihaela Buzărnescu / (Russia) Alena Fomina def. (Netherlands) Lesley Kerkhove / (Belarus) Lidziya Marozava, 6–4, 6–3
