= 2018 Al Habtoor Tennis Challenge =

- Date: 10–16 December
- Edition: 21st
- Category: ITF Women's Circuit
- Prize money: $100,000+H
- Surface: Hard
- Location: Dubai, United Arab Emirates

Champions

Singles
- (China) Peng Shuai

Doubles
- (Russia) Alena Fomina / (Russia) Valentina Ivakhnenko
← 2017 ·	Al Habtoor Tennis Challenge	· 2019 →

The 2018 Al Habtoor Tennis Challenge was a professional tennis tournament played on outdoor hard courts. It was the twenty-first edition of the tournament and was part of the 2018 ITF Women's Circuit. It took place in Dubai, United Arab Emirates, on 10–16 December 2018.

== Singles main draw entrants ==
=== Seeds ===
Country	Player	Rank^{1}	Seed
FRA	Kristina Mladenovic	43	1
SVK	Viktória Kužmová	54	2
GER	Tatjana Maria	74	3
RUS	Evgeniya Rodina	75	4
GER	Mona Barthel	80	5
SUI	Stefanie Vögele	83	6
ROU	Sorana Cîrstea	85	7
SLO	Tamara Zidanšek	86	8

- ^{1} Rankings as of 6 December 2018.

=== Other entrants ===
The following players received a wildcard into the singles main draw:

- (Hungary) Dalma Gálfi
- (Czech Republic) Monika Kilnarová
- (Slovakia) Tereza Mihalíková
- (Russia) Alexandra Panova

The following players received entry using protected rankings:

- (Belarus) Olga Govortsova
- (Netherlands) Quirine Lemoine

The following players received entry from the qualifying draw:

- (Belarus) Yuliya Hatouka
- (Netherlands) Michaëlla Krajicek
- (Cyprus) Raluca Șerban
- (Bulgaria) Isabella Shinikova

== Champions ==
=== Singles ===
- (China) Peng Shuai def. (Slovakia) Viktória Kužmová, 6–3, 6–0

=== Doubles ===
- (Russia) Alena Fomina / (Russia) Valentina Ivakhnenko def. (Hungary) Réka Luca Jani / (Sweden) Cornelia Lister, 7–5, 6–2
