= 2019 Al Habtoor Tennis Challenge – Doubles =

Doubles
- 2019 Al Habtoor Tennis Challenge

Final
- Champions: (Czech Republic) Lucie Hradecká (Slovenia) Andreja Klepač
- Runners-up: (Spain) Georgina García Pérez (Spain) Sara Sorribes Tormo
- Score: 7–5, 3–6, [10–8]

Events
Singles	Doubles
← 2018 ·	Al Habtoor Tennis Challenge	· 2020 →

Alena Fomina and Valentina Ivakhnenko were the defending champions, but lost in the semifinals to Georgina García Pérez and Sara Sorribes Tormo.

Lucie Hradecká and Andreja Klepač won the title, defeating García Pérez and Sorribes Tormo in the final, 7–5, 3–6, [10–8].

== Seeds ==
1. (Czech Republic) Lucie Hradecká / (Slovenia) Andreja Klepač (champions)
2. (Sweden) Cornelia Lister / (Czech Republic) Renata Voráčová (first round)
3. (Spain) Georgina García Pérez / (Spain) Sara Sorribes Tormo (final)
4. (Germany) Anna-Lena Friedsam / (Germany) Tatjana Maria (first round)

== Draw ==
=== Key ===
- Q = Qualifier
- WC = Wild card
- LL = Lucky loser
- Alt = Alternate
- SE = Special exempt
- PR = Protected ranking
- ITF = ITF entry
- JE = Junior exempt
- w/o = Walkover
- r = Retired
- d = Defaulted
- SR = Special ranking

=== Draw ===
First round
1	(Czech Republic) L Hradecká (Slovenia) A Klepač	6	7
WC	(Austria) B Haas (Hungary) RL Jani	1	5
(France) C Paquet (Russia) A Potapova	6	7
WC	(Sweden) A Munozova (United States) A Riley	3	5
4	(Germany) A-L Friedsam (Germany) T Maria	0	3
(Belgium) G Minnen (Belgium) Y Wickmayer	6	6
(Japan) M Kato (Japan) J Namigata	0	6	[7]
(Russia) N Dzalamidze (Serbia) A Krunić	6	4	[10]
(Poland) K Kawa (Brazil) L Pigossi	6	6^{1}	[10]
(United States) B Pera (Slovenia) T Zidanšek	4	7^{7}	[7]
(Romania) A Bogdan (Romania) E-G Ruse	5	6^{4}
3	(Spain) G García Pérez (Spain) S Sorribes Tormo	7	7^{7}
(Romania) E Bogdan (Romania) PM Țig	3	6^{5}
(Georgia (country)) M Bolkvadze (United Kingdom) E Webley-Smith	6	7^{7}
WC	(Russia) A Fomina (Russia) V Ivakhnenko	7	7^{7}
2	(Sweden) C Lister (Czech Republic) R Voráčová	5	6^{2}

Quarterfinals
1	(Czech Republic) L Hradecká (Slovenia) A Klepač	2	6	[10]
(France) C Paquet (Russia) A Potapova	6	1	[8]
(Belgium) G Minnen (Belgium) Y Wickmayer	6	6
(Russia) N Dzalamidze (Serbia) A Krunić	2	3
(Poland) K Kawa (Brazil) L Pigossi	3	6^{3}
3	(Spain) G García Pérez (Spain) S Sorribes Tormo	6	7^{7}
(Georgia (country)) M Bolkvadze (United Kingdom) E Webley-Smith	2	2
WC	(Russia) A Fomina (Russia) V Ivakhnenko	6	6

Semifinals
1	(Czech Republic) L Hradecká (Slovenia) A Klepač	7^{7}	6
(Belgium) G Minnen (Belgium) Y Wickmayer	6^{5}	4
3	(Spain) G García Pérez (Spain) S Sorribes Tormo	7	6
WC	(Russia) A Fomina (Russia) V Ivakhnenko	5	4

Final
1	(Czech Republic) L Hradecká (Slovenia) A Klepač	7	3	[10]
3	(Spain) G García Pérez (Spain) S Sorribes Tormo	5	6	[8]
