= 2017 Al Habtoor Tennis Challenge – Singles =

Singles
- 2017 Al Habtoor Tennis Challenge

Final
- Champion: (Switzerland) Belinda Bencic
- Runner-up: (Croatia) Ajla Tomljanović
- Score: 6–4, 0–0 ret.

Events
Singles	Doubles
← 2016 ·	Al Habtoor Tennis Challenge	· 2018 →

Hsieh Su-wei was the defending champion, but lost in the second round to Stefanie Vögele.

Belinda Bencic won the title after Ajla Tomljanović retired in the final at 6–4, 0–0.

== Seeds ==
1. (Hungary) Tímea Babos (first round)
2. (Romania) Mihaela Buzărnescu (quarterfinals)
3. (Chinese Taipei) Hsieh Su-wei (second round)
4. (Ukraine) Kateryna Kozlova (second round, retired)
5. (Switzerland) Belinda Bencic (champion)
6. (Slovakia) Jana Čepelová (first round)
7. (Croatia) Ajla Tomljanović (final, retired)
8. (Belarus) Vera Lapko (second round)

== Draw ==
=== Key ===
- Q = Qualifier
- WC = Wild card
- LL = Lucky loser
- Alt = Alternate
- SE = Special exempt
- PR = Protected ranking
- ITF = ITF entry
- JE = Junior exempt
- w/o = Walkover
- r = Retired
- d = Defaulted
- SR = Special ranking

=== Finals ===
Semifinals
7	(Croatia) Ajla Tomljanović	6	6
(Switzerland) Stefanie Vögele	2	3
(Italy) Sara Errani	1	4
5	(Switzerland) Belinda Bencic	6	6

Final
7	(Croatia) Ajla Tomljanović	4	0^{r}
5	(Switzerland) Belinda Bencic	6	0

=== Top half ===
First round
1	(Hungary) T Babos	5	2
(Russia) P Monova	7	6
(Poland) M Fręch	7^{8}	6
(Switzerland) P Schnyder	6^{6}	1
(Serbia) I Jorović	5	7^{7}	4
(Russia) V Ivakhnenko	7	6^{4}	6
Q	(France) F Ferro	0	0
7	(Croatia) A Tomljanović	6	6
3	(Chinese Taipei) S-w Hsieh	6	6
WC	(Russia) A Potapova	3	1
(Switzerland) S Vögele	6	6
(Turkey) Ç Büyükakçay	4	0
WC	(Sweden) C Lister	2	2
Q	(Slovenia) D Jakupović	6	6
Q	(Hungary) F Stollár	6	6
6	(Slovakia) J Čepelová	4	3

Second round
(Russia) P Monova	4	1
(Poland) M Fręch	6	6
(Russia) V Ivakhnenko	5	3
7	(Croatia) A Tomljanović	7	6
3	(Chinese Taipei) S-w Hsieh	1	7	0
(Switzerland) S Vögele	6	5	6
Q	(Slovenia) D Jakupović	7	5	6
Q	(Hungary) F Stollár	5	7	2

Quarterfinals
(Poland) M Fręch	5	5
7	(Croatia) A Tomljanović	7	7
(Switzerland) S Vögele	5
Q	(Slovenia) D Jakupović	1^{r}

Semifinals
7	(Croatia) A Tomljanović	6	6
(Switzerland) S Vögele	2	3

=== Bottom half ===
First round
8	(Belarus) V Lapko	7	7
(Ukraine) D Yastremska	5	5
(Romania) A Cadanțu	2	1
(Italy) S Errani	6	6
(Netherlands) L Kerkhove	6	2	4
(Bulgaria) V Tomova	3	6	6
(Uzbekistan) S Sharipova	6	5	6^{3}
4	(Ukraine) K Kozlova	2	7	7^{7}
5	(Switzerland) B Bencic	6	6
(Russia) V Diatchenko	4	4
(Czech Republic) T Martincová	6	6
(Slovenia) T Zidanšek	4	4
WC	(Hungary) D Gálfi	6	6
Q	(Netherlands) M Krajicek	0	3
WC	(Japan) A Morita	0	1
2	(Romania) M Buzărnescu	6	6

Second round
8	(Belarus) V Lapko	4	6^{4}
(Italy) S Errani	6	7^{7}
(Bulgaria) V Tomova	7^{8}	5
4	(Ukraine) K Kozlova	6^{6}	4^{r}
5	(Switzerland) B Bencic	6	6
(Czech Republic) T Martincová	2	1
WC	(Hungary) D Gálfi	0	2
2	(Romania) M Buzărnescu	6	6

Quarterfinals
(Italy) S Errani	2	7	7
(Bulgaria) V Tomova	6	5	5
5	(Switzerland) B Bencic	7^{7}	6
2	(Romania) M Buzărnescu	6^{4}	2

Semifinals
(Italy) S Errani	1	4
5	(Switzerland) B Bencic	6	6
