= 2017 Al Habtoor Tennis Challenge – Doubles =

Doubles
- 2017 Al Habtoor Tennis Challenge

Final
- Champion: (Romania) Mihaela Buzărnescu (Russia) Alena Fomina
- Runner-up: (Netherlands) Lesley Kerkhove (Belarus) Lidziya Marozava
- Score: 6–4, 6–3

Events
Singles	Doubles
← 2016 ·	Al Habtoor Tennis Challenge	· 2018 →

Mandy Minella and Nina Stojanović were the defending champions, however both players chose not to participate.

Mihaela Buzărnescu and Alena Fomina won the title, defeating Lesley Kerkhove and Lidziya Marozava in the final, 6–4, 6–3.

== Seeds ==
1. (Netherlands) Lesley Kerkhove / (Belarus) Lidziya Marozava (final)
2. (Slovenia) Dalila Jakupović / (Netherlands) Eva Wacanno (quarterfinals)
3. (Belarus) Vera Lapko / (Sweden) Cornelia Lister (quarterfinals)
4. (Italy) Sara Errani / (Poland) Alicja Rosolska (quarterfinals)

== Draw ==
=== Key ===
- Q = Qualifier
- WC = Wild card
- LL = Lucky loser
- Alt = Alternate
- SE = Special exempt
- PR = Protected ranking
- ITF = ITF entry
- JE = Junior exempt
- w/o = Walkover
- r = Retired
- d = Defaulted
- SR = Special ranking

First round
1	(Netherlands) L Kerkhove (Belarus) L Marozava	6	6
(United States) K Christian (United States) S Santamaria	1	0
(Romania) A Cadanțu (Russia) V Ivakhnenko	6	2	[5]
(Chinese Taipei) S-y Hsieh (Chinese Taipei) S-w Hsieh	4	6	[10]
3	(Belarus) V Lapko (Sweden) C Lister	6	6
(Uzbekistan) S Sharipova (India) P Thombare	3	3
(Netherlands) M Krajicek (Russia) A Kudryavtseva	6	6
PR	(Hungary) RL Jani (Hungary) F Stollár	4	4
WC	(Uzbekistan) A Amanmuradova (Germany) L Ponomar	3	7^{8}	[6]
(Romania) M Buzărnescu (Russia) A Fomina	6	6^{6}	[10]
WC	(Switzerland) A Sadiković (Switzerland) P Schnyder	3	6^{5}
4	(Italy) S Errani (Poland) A Rosolska	6	7^{7}
(Chile) A Guarachi (Russia) V Savinykh	2	0
(Russia) P Monova (Russia) Y Sizikova	6	6
WC	(Russia) N Dzalamidze (Hungary) D Gálfi	4	5
2	(Slovenia) D Jakupović (Netherlands) E Wacanno	6	7

Quarterfinals
1	(Netherlands) L Kerkhove (Belarus) L Marozava	6	6
(Chinese Taipei) S-y Hsieh (Chinese Taipei) S-w Hsieh	4	2
3	(Belarus) V Lapko (Sweden) C Lister	4	2
(Netherlands) M Krajicek (Russia) A Kudryavtseva	6	6
(Romania) M Buzărnescu (Russia) A Fomina	3	6	[10]
4	(Italy) S Errani (Poland) A Rosolska	6	4	[3]
(Russia) P Monova (Russia) Y Sizikova	4	7^{7}	[10]
2	(Slovenia) D Jakupović (Netherlands) E Wacanno	6	6^{2}	[3]

Semifinals
1	(Netherlands) L Kerkhove (Belarus) L Marozava	7	3	[10]
(Netherlands) M Krajicek (Russia) A Kudryavtseva	5	6	[7]
(Romania) M Buzărnescu (Russia) A Fomina	4	7^{7}	[11]
(Russia) P Monova (Russia) Y Sizikova	6	6^{6}	[9]

Final
1	(Netherlands) L Kerkhove (Belarus) L Marozava	4	3
(Romania) M Buzărnescu (Russia) A Fomina	6	6
