= 2014 Al Habtoor Tennis Challenge =

- Date: 10–16 November
- Edition: 16th
- Category: ITF Women's Circuit
- Prize money: $75,000
- Surface: Hard
- Location: Dubai, United Arab Emirates
- Venue: Habtoor Grand Beach Resort & Spa

Champions

Singles
- (Romania) Alexandra Dulgheru

Doubles
- (Russia) Vitalia Diatchenko / (Russia) Alexandra Panova
← 2013 ·	Al Habtoor Tennis Challenge	· 2015 →

The 2014 Al Habtoor Tennis Challenge was a professional tennis tournament played on outdoor hard courts. It was the 16th edition of the tournament which was part of the 2014 ITF Women's Circuit, offering a total of $75,000 in prize money. It took place in Dubai, United Arab Emirates, on 10–16 November 2014.

== Singles entrants ==
=== Seeds ===
Country	Player	Rank^{1}	Seed
SVK	Jana Čepelová	53	1
BEL	Alison Van Uytvanck	80	2
CZE	Tereza Smitková	83	3
GER	Anna-Lena Friedsam	87	4
GER	Carina Witthöft	104	5
ROU	Alexandra Dulgheru	105	6
RUS	Vitalia Diatchenko	108	7
MNE	Danka Kovinić	109	8

- ^{1} Rankings as of 3 November 2014

=== Other entrants ===
The following players received wildcards into the singles main draw:

- (Uzbekistan) Akgul Amanmuradova
- (Spain) Laura Pous Tió
- (United States) Alexandra Riley
- (Ukraine) Olga Savchuk

The following players received entry from the qualifying draw:

- (France) Amandine Hesse
- (Czech Republic) Kateřina Kramperová
- (France) Irina Ramialison
- (Bulgaria) Viktoriya Tomova

The following player received entry into the singles main draw as a lucky loser:

- (Romania) Nicoleta-Cătălina Dascălu

== Champions ==
=== Singles ===
- (Romania) Alexandra Dulgheru def. (Japan) Kimiko Date-Krumm 6–3, 6–4

=== Doubles ===
- (Russia) Vitalia Diatchenko / (Russia) Alexandra Panova def. (Ukraine) Lyudmyla Kichenok / (Ukraine) Olga Savchuk 3–6, 6–2, [10–4]
