= 2016 Al Habtoor Tennis Challenge – Doubles =

Doubles
- 2016 Al Habtoor Tennis Challenge

Final
- Champions: (Luxembourg) Mandy Minella (Serbia) Nina Stojanović
- Runners-up: (Chinese Taipei) Hsieh Su-wei (Russia) Valeria Savinykh
- Score: 6–3, 3–6, [10–4]

Events
| Singles | Doubles |
| ← 2015 · | Al Habtoor Tennis Challenge | · 2017 → |

Çağla Büyükakçay and Maria Sakkari were the defending champions, but Sakkari chose not to participate. Büyükakçay partnered Mona Barthel, but lost in the quarterfinals to Lesley Kerkhove and Lidziya Marozava.

Mandy Minella and Nina Stojanović won the title, defeating Hsieh Su-wei and Valeria Savinykh in the final, 6–3, 3–6, [10–4].

== Seeds ==
1. (Japan) Shuko Aoyama / (Netherlands) Demi Schuurs (quarterfinals)
2. (Russia) Natela Dzalamidze / (Russia) Veronika Kudermetova (semifinals)
3. (Serbia) Aleksandra Krunić / (Kazakhstan) Galina Voskoboeva (first round)
4. (Netherlands) Lesley Kerkhove / (Belarus) Lidziya Marozava (semifinals)

== Draw ==
=== Key ===
- Q = Qualifier
- WC = Wild card
- LL = Lucky loser
- Alt = Alternate
- SE = Special exempt
- PR = Protected ranking
- ITF = ITF entry
- JE = Junior exempt
- w/o = Walkover
- r = Retired
- d = Defaulted
- SR = Special ranking

First round
1 | (Japan) S Aoyama (Netherlands) D Schuurs | 6 | 6
WC | (Croatia) J Fett (Hungary) D Gálfi | 4 | 2
(Luxembourg) M Minella (Serbia) N Stojanović | 7^{7} | 6
(Belgium) E Boeykens (Ukraine) A Fomina | 6^{3} | 3
4 | (Netherlands) L Kerkhove (Belarus) L Marozava | 6 | 6
WC | (Poland) A Rosolska (Switzerland) P Schnyder | 2 | 4
(Hungary) Á Bukta (Slovakia) V Juhászová | 2 | 4
WC | (Germany) M Barthel (Turkey) Ç Büyükakçay | 6 | 6
(Romania) E Bogdan (Turkey) B Eraydın | 2 | 6 | [1]
(Chinese Taipei) S-w Hsieh (Russia) V Savinykh | 6 | 2 | [10]
(Netherlands) C Burger (Netherlands) Q Lemoine | 7^{7} | 4 | [10]
3 | (Serbia) A Krunić (Kazakhstan) G Voskoboeva | 6^{2} | 6 | [5]
(Uzbekistan) S Sharipova (Ukraine) A Vasylyeva | 6 | 6
(Romania) C Dinu (Slovenia) T Majerič | 2 | 1
(Sweden) C Lister (United Kingdom) T Moore | 3 | 5
2 | (Russia) N Dzalamidze (Russia) V Kudermetova | 6 | 7

Quarterfinals
1 | (Japan) S Aoyama (Netherlands) D Schuurs | 1 | 4
(Luxembourg) M Minella (Serbia) N Stojanović | 6 | 6
4 | (Netherlands) L Kerkhove (Belarus) L Marozava | 6 | 6
WC | (Germany) M Barthel (Turkey) Ç Büyükakçay | 2 | 3
(Chinese Taipei) S-w Hsieh (Russia) V Savinykh | 7 | 6
(Netherlands) C Burger (Netherlands) Q Lemoine | 5 | 1
(Uzbekistan) S Sharipova (Ukraine) A Vasylyeva | 0 | 3
2 | (Russia) N Dzalamidze (Russia) V Kudermetova | 6 | 6

Semifinals
(Luxembourg) M Minella (Serbia) N Stojanović | 4 | 6 | [10]
4 | (Netherlands) L Kerkhove (Belarus) L Marozava | 6 | 3 | [4]
(Chinese Taipei) S-w Hsieh (Russia) V Savinykh | 2 | 6 | [10]
2 | (Russia) N Dzalamidze (Russia) V Kudermetova | 6 | 3 | [5]

Final
(Luxembourg) M Minella (Serbia) N Stojanović | 6 | 3 | [10]
(Chinese Taipei) S-w Hsieh (Russia) V Savinykh | 3 | 6 | [4]
