= 2019 Al Habtoor Tennis Challenge =

- Date: 9–15 December 2019
- Edition: 21st
- Category: ITF Women's World Tennis Tour
- Prize money: $100,000+H
- Surface: Hard
- Location: Dubai, United Arab Emirates

Champions

Singles
- (Romania) Ana Bogdan

Doubles
- (Czech Republic) Lucie Hradecká / (Slovenia) Andreja Klepač
← 2018 ·	Al Habtoor Tennis Challenge	· 2020 →

The 2019 Al Habtoor Tennis Challenge was a professional tennis tournament played on outdoor hard courts. It was the twenty-first edition of the tournament which was part of the 2019 ITF Women's World Tennis Tour. It took place in Dubai, United Arab Emirates between 9 and 15 December 2019.

== Singles main-draw entrants ==
=== Seeds ===
Country	Player	Rank^{1}	Seed
FRA	Kristina Mladenovic	38	1
SVK	Viktória Kužmová	52	2
SLO	Tamara Zidanšek	63	3
USA	Bernarda Pera	65	4
ESP	Sara Sorribes Tormo	85	5
GER	Tatjana Maria	87	6
RUS	Vitalia Diatchenko	91	7
RUS	Anastasia Potapova	95	8

- ^{1} Rankings are as of 2 December 2019.

=== Other entrants ===
The following players received wildcards into the singles main draw:

- (Hungary) Dalma Gálfi
- (Poland) Urszula Radwańska
- (Romania) Elena-Gabriela Ruse
- (Egypt) Mayar Sherif

The following players received entry from the qualifying draw:

- (Uzbekistan) Akgul Amanmuradova
- (Poland) Magdalena Fręch
- (Spain) Georgina García Pérez
- (Russia) Valentina Ivakhnenko
- (Serbia) Aleksandra Krunić
- (Luxembourg) Eléonora Molinaro
- (Ukraine) Anastasiya Shoshyna
- (Ukraine) Daria Snigur

== Champions ==
=== Singles ===
- (Romania) Ana Bogdan def. (Ukraine) Daria Snigur, 6–1, 6–2

=== Doubles ===
- (Czech Republic) Lucie Hradecká / (Slovenia) Andreja Klepač def. (Spain) Georgina García Pérez / (Spain) Sara Sorribes Tormo, 7–5, 3–6, [10–8]
