= 2018 Al Habtoor Tennis Challenge – Singles =

Singles
- 2018 Al Habtoor Tennis Challenge

Final
- Champion: (China) Peng Shuai
- Runner-up: (Slovakia) Viktória Kužmová
- Score: 6–3, 6–0

Events
Singles	Doubles
← 2017 ·	Al Habtoor Tennis Challenge	· 2019 →

Belinda Bencic was the defending champion, but chose not to participate.

Peng Shuai won the title, defeating Viktória Kužmová in the final, 6–3, 6–0.

== Seeds ==
1. (France) Kristina Mladenovic (quarterfinals, retired)
2. (Slovakia) Viktória Kužmová (final)
3. (Germany) Tatjana Maria (quarterfinals)
4. (Russia) Evgeniya Rodina (semifinals)
5. (Germany) Mona Barthel (quarterfinals)
6. (Switzerland) Stefanie Vögele (semifinals)
7. (Romania) Sorana Cîrstea (second round)
8. (Slovenia) Tamara Zidanšek (quarterfinals)

== Draw ==
=== Key ===
- Q = Qualifier
- WC = Wild card
- LL = Lucky loser
- Alt = Alternate
- SE = Special exempt
- PR = Protected ranking
- ITF = ITF entry
- JE = Junior exempt
- w/o = Walkover
- r = Retired
- d = Defaulted
- SR = Special ranking

=== Finals ===
Semifinals
6	(Switzerland) Stefanie Vögele	5	2
(China) Peng Shuai	7	6
4	(Russia) Evgeniya Rodina	1	2
2	(Slovakia) Viktória Kužmová	6	6

Final
(China) Peng Shuai	6	6
2	(Slovakia) Viktória Kužmová	3	0

=== Top half ===
First round
1	(France) K Mladenovic	6	6
(Russia) N Vikhlyantseva	3	3
Q	(Netherlands) M Krajicek	5	2
Q	(Bulgaria) I Shinikova	7	6
(India) A Raina	7^{7}	6
WC	(Slovakia) T Mihalíková	6^{3}	3
(Russia) V Ivakhnenko	5	4
6	(Switzerland) S Vögele	7	6
3	(Germany) T Maria	6	6
(Slovenia) K Juvan	2	4
(Ukraine) K Zavatska	6	6
WC	(Czech Republic) M Kilnarová	4	4
(China) S Peng	2	6	7^{7}
(Switzerland) V Golubic	6	2	6^{5}
Q	(Belarus) Y Hatouka	3	3
7	(Romania) S Cîrstea	6	6

Second round
1	(France) K Mladenovic	6	6
Q	(Bulgaria) I Shinikova	3	2
(India) A Raina	2	2
6	(Switzerland) S Vögele	6	6
3	(Germany) T Maria	6	6
(Ukraine) K Zavatska	2	4
(China) S Peng	6	6
7	(Romania) S Cîrstea	1	1

Quarterfinals
1	(France) K Mladenovic	2	0^{r}
6	(Switzerland) S Vögele	6	3
3	(Germany) T Maria	3	2
(China) S Peng	6	6

Semifinals
6	(Switzerland) S Vögele	5	2
(China) S Peng	7	6

=== Bottom half ===
First round
8	(Slovenia) T Zidanšek	6^{4}	6	7^{7}
PR	(Belarus) O Govortsova	7^{7}	4	6^{5}
WC	(Hungary) D Gálfi	6	6
(Uzbekistan) S Sharipova	1	2
(Germany) C Witthöft	3	3
(Bulgaria) V Tomova	6	6
(France) A Hesse	7^{7}	1	2
4	(Russia) E Rodina	6^{2}	6	6
5	(Germany) M Barthel	6	6
WC	(Russia) A Panova	4	2
Q	(Cyprus) R Șerban	6^{5}	2
PR	(Netherlands) Q Lemoine	7^{7}	6
(Luxembourg) M Minella	6	6
(Greece) V Grammatikopoulou	1	4
(Spain) S Sorribes Tormo	7	4	4
2	(Slovakia) V Kužmová	5	6	6

Second round
8	(Slovenia) T Zidanšek	6	6
WC	(Hungary) D Gálfi	1	1
(Bulgaria) V Tomova	4	2
4	(Russia) E Rodina	6	6
5	(Germany) M Barthel	6	6
PR	(Netherlands) Q Lemoine	2	4
(Luxembourg) M Minella	1	6	3
2	(Slovakia) V Kužmová	6	2	6

Quarterfinals
8	(Slovenia) T Zidanšek	6	5	5
4	(Russia) E Rodina	4	7	7
5	(Germany) M Barthel	6	4	4
2	(Slovakia) V Kužmová	4	6	6

Semifinals
4	(Russia) E Rodina	1	2
2	(Slovakia) V Kužmová	6	6
