= 2019 Al Habtoor Tennis Challenge – Singles =

Singles
- 2019 Al Habtoor Tennis Challenge

Final
- Champion: (Romania) Ana Bogdan
- Runner-up: (Ukraine) Daria Snigur
- Score: 6–1, 6–2

Events
| Singles | Doubles |
| ← 2018 · | Al Habtoor Tennis Challenge | · 2020 → |

Peng Shuai was the defending champion, but chose not to participate.

Ana Bogdan won the title, defeating Daria Snigur in the final, 6–1, 6–2.

== Seeds ==
1. (France) Kristina Mladenovic (semifinals)
2. (Slovakia) Viktória Kužmová (second round)
3. (Slovenia) Tamara Zidanšek (first round)
4. (United States) Bernarda Pera (first round)
5. (Spain) Sara Sorribes Tormo (quarterfinals)
6. (Germany) Tatjana Maria (second round)
7. (Russia) Vitalia Diatchenko (second round)
8. (Russia) Anastasia Potapova (second round)

== Draw ==
=== Key ===
- Q = Qualifier
- WC = Wild card
- LL = Lucky loser
- Alt = Alternate
- SE = Special exempt
- PR = Protected ranking
- ITF = ITF entry
- JE = Junior exempt
- w/o = Walkover
- r = Retired
- d = Defaulted
- SR = Special ranking

=== Finals ===
Semifinals
1 | (France) Kristina Mladenovic | 3 | 6^{6}
Q | (Ukraine) Daria Snigur | 6 | 7^{8}
(Belgium) Greet Minnen | 6 | 3 | 2
(Romania) Ana Bogdan | 4 | 6 | 6

Final
Q | (Ukraine) Daria Snigur | 1 | 2
(Romania) Ana Bogdan | 6 | 6

=== Top half ===
First round
1 | (France) K Mladenovic | 6 | 6
WC | (Egypt) M Sherif | 1 | 2
(Czech Republic) B Krejčíková | 4 | 1
(Switzerland) S Vögele | 6 | 6
Q | (Spain) G García Pérez | 6 | 3 | 1
(Georgia (country)) M Bolkvadze | 3 | 6 | 6
WC | (Poland) U Radwańska | 0 | 4
5 | (Spain) S Sorribes Tormo | 6 | 6
4 | (United States) B Pera | 4 | 1
(Germany) A-L Friedsam | 6 | 6
Q | (Russia) V Ivakhnenko | 3 | 2
Q | (Poland) M Fręch | 6 | 6
Q | (Ukraine) D Snigur | 6 | 6
(Belgium) Y Wickmayer | 4 | 1
(Ukraine) A Kalinina | 6^{4} | 0^{r}
8 | (Russia) A Potapova | 7^{7} | 0

Second round
1 | (France) K Mladenovic | 6 | 6
(Switzerland) S Vögele | 3 | 4
(Georgia (country)) M Bolkvadze | 4 | 0^{r}
5 | (Spain) S Sorribes Tormo | 6 | 3
(Germany) A-L Friedsam | 6 | 3 | 0
Q | (Poland) M Fręch | 2 | 6 | 6
Q | (Ukraine) D Snigur | 6 | 6
8 | (Russia) A Potapova | 2 | 3

Quarterfinals
1 | (France) K Mladenovic | 6^{3} | 6 | 6
5 | (Spain) S Sorribes Tormo | 7^{7} | 3 | 2
Q | (Poland) M Fręch | 4 | 4
Q | (Ukraine) D Snigur | 6 | 6

Semifinals
1 | (France) K Mladenovic | 3 | 6^{6}
Q | (Ukraine) D Snigur | 6 | 7^{8}

=== Bottom half ===
First round
7 | (Russia) V Diatchenko | 6 | 6
WC | (Romania) E-G Ruse | 0 | 3
(Belgium) G Minnen | 6 | 6
Q | (Luxembourg) E Molinaro | 4 | 4
(Austria) B Haas | 6 | 7^{7}
Q | (Ukraine) A Shoshyna | 4 | 6^{5}
(Russia) V Gracheva | 6 | 7
3 | (Slovenia) T Zidanšek | 0 | 5
6 | (Germany) T Maria | 7^{7} | 2 | 7
(Romania) PM Țig | 6^{5} | 6 | 5
Q | (Uzbekistan) A Amanmuradova | 4 | 2
(Poland) K Kawa | 6 | 6
WC | (Hungary) D Gálfi | 6 | 4 | 2
(Romania) A Bogdan | 1 | 6 | 6
Q | (Serbia) A Krunić | 4 | 6^{2}
2 | (Slovakia) V Kužmová | 6 | 7^{7}

Second round
7 | (Russia) V Diatchenko | 3 | 1
(Belgium) G Minnen | 6 | 6
(Austria) B Haas | 7^{10} | 6
(Russia) V Gracheva | 6^{8} | 2
6 | (Germany) T Maria | 2 | 3
(Poland) K Kawa | 6 | 6
(Romania) A Bogdan | 6 | 6
2 | (Slovakia) V Kužmová | 1 | 4

Quarterfinals
(Belgium) G Minnen | 6 | 6
(Austria) B Haas | 1 | 3
(Poland) K Kawa | 2 | 2
(Romania) A Bogdan | 6 | 6

Semifinals
(Belgium) G Minnen | 6 | 3 | 2
(Romania) A Bogdan | 4 | 6 | 6
