= 2015 Al Habtoor Tennis Challenge – Singles =

Singles
- 2015 Al Habtoor Tennis Challenge

Final
- Champion: (Turkey) Çağla Büyükakçay
- Runner-up: (Czech Republic) Klára Koukalová
- Score: 6–7^{(4–7)}, 6–4, 6–4

Events
Singles	Doubles
← 2014 ·	Al Habtoor Tennis Challenge	· 2016 →

Alexandra Dulgheru was the defending champion, but lost in the quarterfinals to Çağla Büyükakçay.

Büyükakçay went on to win the title, defeating Klára Koukalová in the final, 6–7^{(4–7)}, 6–4, 6–4.

== Seeds ==
1. (Romania) Alexandra Dulgheru (quarterfinals)
2. (Czech Republic) Klára Koukalová (final)
3. (Russia) Alexandra Panova (semifinals)
4. (Slovakia) Kristína Kučová (quarterfinals)
5. (Belgium) Elise Mertens (quarterfinals)
6. (Turkey) Çağla Büyükakçay (champion)
7. (Turkey) İpek Soylu (semifinals)
8. (Greece) Maria Sakkari (first round)

== Main draw ==
=== Key ===
- Q = Qualifier
- WC = Wild card
- LL = Lucky loser
- Alt = Alternate
- SE = Special exempt
- PR = Protected ranking
- ITF = ITF entry
- JE = Junior exempt
- w/o = Walkover
- r = Retired
- d = Defaulted
- SR = Special ranking

=== Finals ===
Semifinals
6	(Turkey) Çağla Büyükakçay	5	6	6
7	(Turkey) İpek Soylu	7	2	1
3	(Russia) Alexandra Panova	6^{3}	3
2	(Czech Republic) Klára Koukalová	7^{7}	6

Final
6	(Turkey) Çağla Büyükakçay	6^{4}	6	6
2	(Czech Republic) Klára Koukalová	7^{7}	4	4

=== Top half ===
First round
1	(Romania) A Dulgheru	6^{8}	6	6
(Italy) M Caregaro	7^{10}	3	2
(Romania) C Dinu	5	6^{4}
(Russia) V Ivakhnenko	7	7^{7}
(Switzerland) A Sadiković	7^{7}	6
(Ukraine) O Ianchuk	6^{4}	4
(Ukraine) L Kichenok	0	4
6	(Turkey) Ç Büyükakçay	6	6
4	(Slovakia) K Kučová	6	6
(Russia) P Leykina	1	0
(Spain) L Pous Tió	7^{8}	6
Q	(Spain) C Sánchez Quintanar	6^{6}	4
(India) A Raina	6	6
(Russia) M Melnikova	3	2
WC	(Ukraine) O Fridman	6	3	6^{1}
7	(Turkey) İ Soylu	1	6	7^{7}

Second round
1	(Romania) A Dulgheru	6	6
(Russia) V Ivakhnenko	2	2
(Switzerland) A Sadiković	2	3
6	(Turkey) Ç Büyükakçay	6	6
4	(Slovakia) K Kučová	6	6
(Spain) L Pous Tió	3	2
(India) A Raina	5	2
7	(Turkey) İ Soylu	7	6

Quarterfinals
1	(Romania) A Dulgheru	6	4	3
6	(Turkey) Ç Büyükakçay	4	6	6
4	(Slovakia) K Kučová	1	6	6^{4}
7	(Turkey) İ Soylu	6	2	7^{7}

Semifinals
6	(Turkey) Ç Büyükakçay	5	6	6
7	(Turkey) İ Soylu	7	2	1

=== Bottom half ===
First round
8	(Greece) M Sakkari	3	3
(France) F Ferro	6	6
(France) I Ramialison	7^{8}	2	2
(Czech Republic) T Martincová	6^{6}	6	6
Q	(Romania) N Dascălu	6	6
Q	(Russia) M Marfutina	4	4
(Ukraine) N Kichenok	1	2
3	(Russia) A Panova	6	6
5	(Belgium) E Mertens	2	6	6
WC	(Bulgaria) I Shinikova	6	3	3
WC	(Italy) C Coppola	1	0
(Czech Republic) K Vaňková	6	6
(Russia) N Vikhlyantseva	6	6
WC	(Bosnia and Herzegovina) D Herdželaš	3	2
Q	(Egypt) S Samir	3	0
2	(Czech Republic) K Koukalová	6	6

Second round
(France) F Ferro	1	3
(Czech Republic) T Martincová	6	6
Q	(Romania) N Dascălu	1	7^{7}	5
3	(Russia) A Panova	6	6^{1}	7
5	(Belgium) E Mertens	6	6
(Czech Republic) K Vaňková	3	0
(Russia) N Vikhlyantseva	2	3
2	(Czech Republic) K Koukalová	6	6

Quarterfinals
(Czech Republic) T Martincová	3	1
3	(Russia) A Panova	6	6
5	(Belgium) E Mertens	5	1
2	(Czech Republic) K Koukalová	7	6

Semifinals
3	(Russia) A Panova	6^{3}	3
2	(Czech Republic) K Koukalová	7^{7}	6
