= 2021 Al Habtoor Tennis Challenge – Doubles =

Doubles
- 2021 Al Habtoor Tennis Challenge

Final
- Champions: (Kazakhstan) Anna Danilina (Slovakia) Viktória Kužmová
- Runners-up: (Russia) Angelina Gabueva (Russia) Anastasia Zakharova
- Score: 4–6, 6–3, [10–2]

Events
Singles	Doubles
← 2020 ·	Al Habtoor Tennis Challenge	· 2022 →

Ekaterine Gorgodze and Ankita Raina were the defending champions but Gorgodze chose not to participate. Raina partnered alongside Tereza Mihalíková but lost in the quarterfinals to Angelina Gabueva and Anastasia Zakharova.

Anna Danilina and Viktória Kužmová won the title, defeating Gabueva and Zakharova in the final, 4–6, 6–3, [10–2].

== Seeds ==
1. (Kazakhstan) Anna Danilina / (Slovakia) Viktória Kužmová (champions)
2. (Ukraine) Kateryna Bondarenko / (Belarus) Lidziya Marozava (quarterfinals)
3. (Germany) Vivian Heisen / (Romania) Andreea Mitu (first round)
4. (Slovakia) Tereza Mihalíková / (India) Ankita Raina (quarterfinals)

== Draw ==
=== Key ===
- Q = Qualifier
- WC = Wild card
- LL = Lucky loser
- Alt = Alternate
- SE = Special exempt
- PR = Protected ranking
- ITF = ITF entry
- JE = Junior exempt
- w/o = Walkover
- r = Retired
- d = Defaulted
- SR = Special ranking

=== Draw ===
First round
1	(Kazakhstan) A Danilina (Slovakia) V Kužmová	6	7
(Russia) A Gasanova (Russia) O Selekhmeteva	3	5
WC	(Turkey) B Cengiz (Poland) W Falkowska	4	4
(Slovakia) K Kučová (Czech Republic) R Voráčová	6	6
3	(Germany) V Heisen (Romania) A Mitu	5	4
(Thailand) P Plipuech (Indonesia) A Sutjiadi	7	6
(Belarus) Y Hatouka (Indonesia) J Rompies	6	6
(Austria) J Grabher (Russia) N Vikhlyantseva	3	4
(Netherlands) B Schoofs (United Kingdom) E Silva	4	5
(Russia) A Gabueva (Russia) A Zakharova	6	7
(Russia) A Fomina-Klotz (Russia) E Yashina	5	5
4	(Slovakia) T Mihalíková (India) A Raina	7	7
WC	(Egypt) S Samir (Bulgaria) I Shinikova	1	1
(Indonesia) B Gumulya (Chinese Taipei) Y-c Hsieh	6	6
WC	(Chinese Taipei) J Garland (Israel) L Glushko	5	1
2	(Ukraine) K Bondarenko (Belarus) L Marozava	7	6

Quarterfinals
1	(Kazakhstan) A Danilina (Slovakia) V Kužmová	w/o
(Slovakia) K Kučová (Czech Republic) R Voráčová
(Thailand) P Plipuech (Indonesia) A Sutjiadi	6	6
(Belarus) Y Hatouka (Indonesia) J Rompies	1	1
(Russia) A Gabueva (Russia) A Zakharova	6	6
4	(Slovakia) T Mihalíková (India) A Raina	3	3
(Indonesia) B Gumulya (Chinese Taipei) Y-c Hsieh	6	7
2	(Ukraine) K Bondarenko (Belarus) L Marozava	3	6^{5}

Semifinals
1	(Kazakhstan) A Danilina (Slovakia) V Kužmová	4	6	[10]
(Thailand) P Plipuech (Indonesia) A Sutjiadi	6	2	[4]
(Russia) A Gabueva (Russia) A Zakharova	7^{7}	4	[10]
(Indonesia) B Gumulya (Chinese Taipei) Y-c Hsieh	6^{3}	6	[5]

Final
1	(Kazakhstan) A Danilina (Slovakia) V Kužmová	4	6	[10]
(Russia) A Gabueva (Russia) A Zakharova	6	3	[2]
