= 2018 Al Habtoor Tennis Challenge – Doubles =

Doubles
- 2018 Al Habtoor Tennis Challenge

Final
- Champions: (Russia) Alena Fomina (Russia) Valentina Ivakhnenko
- Runners-up: (Hungary) Réka Luca Jani (Sweden) Cornelia Lister
- Score: 7–5, 6–2

Events
Singles	Doubles
← 2017 ·	Al Habtoor Tennis Challenge	· 2019 →

Mihaela Buzărnescu and Alena Fomina were the defending champions, but Buzărnescu chose not participate.

Fomina played alongside Valentina Ivakhnenko and successfully defended her title, defeating Réka Luca Jani and Cornelia Lister in the final, 7–5, 6–2.

== Seeds ==
1. (Switzerland) Viktorija Golubic / (Spain) Sara Sorribes Tormo (first round)
2. (Germany) Mona Barthel / (Georgia (country)) Oksana Kalashnikova (first round)
3. (Uzbekistan) Akgul Amanmuradova / (Russia) Alexandra Panova (quarterfinals)
4. (Brazil) Laura Pigossi / (Belgium) Maryna Zanevska (first round)

== Draw ==
=== Key ===
- Q = Qualifier
- WC = Wild card
- LL = Lucky loser
- Alt = Alternate
- SE = Special exempt
- PR = Protected ranking
- ITF = ITF entry
- JE = Junior exempt
- w/o = Walkover
- r = Retired
- d = Defaulted
- SR = Special ranking

=== Draw ===
First round
1	(Switzerland) V Golubic (Spain) S Sorribes Tormo	7^{9}	3	[5]
PR	(Belarus) O Govortsova (Luxembourg) M Minella	6^{7}	6	[10]
(Slovakia) V Kužmová (Slovakia) T Mihalíková	5	4
PR	(Netherlands) Q Lemoine (Netherlands) E Wacanno	7	6
3	(Uzbekistan) A Amanmuradova (Russia) A Panova	6	6
Alt	(Turkey) P Özgen (Croatia) A Vrljić	2	0
(Russia) A Fomina (Russia) V Ivakhnenko	3	6	[10]
(Hungary) D Gálfi (Greece) V Grammatikopoulou	6	3	[5]
WC	(Australia) I Bozicevic (Romania) M Bulgaru	6	6
WC	(Switzerland) L Aiche (Nigeria) B Anuna	1	1
(Czech Republic) R Voráčová (Slovenia) T Zidanšek	7^{7}	4	[10]
4	(Brazil) L Pigossi (Belgium) M Zanevska	6^{4}	6	[5]
(Romania) C Dinu (Romania) A Mitu	6	6
(Cyprus) R Șerban (Bulgaria) I Shinikova	2	4
(Hungary) RL Jani (Sweden) C Lister	6	4	[10]
2	(Germany) M Barthel (Georgia (country)) O Kalashnikova	3	6	[5]

Quarterfinals
PR	(Belarus) O Govortsova (Luxembourg) M Minella	7	7
PR	(Netherlands) Q Lemoine (Netherlands) E Wacanno	5	5
3	(Uzbekistan) A Amanmuradova (Russia) A Panova	4	5
(Russia) A Fomina (Russia) V Ivakhnenko	6	7
WC	(Australia) I Bozicevic (Romania) M Bulgaru	2	3
(Czech Republic) R Voráčová (Slovenia) T Zidanšek	6	6
(Romania) C Dinu (Romania) A Mitu	0	3
(Hungary) RL Jani (Sweden) C Lister	6	6

Semifinals
PR	(Belarus) O Govortsova (Luxembourg) M Minella	2	4
(Russia) A Fomina (Russia) V Ivakhnenko	6	6
(Czech Republic) R Voráčová (Slovenia) T Zidanšek	6^{3}	6	[7]
(Hungary) RL Jani (Sweden) C Lister	7^{7}	2	[10]

Final
(Russia) A Fomina (Russia) V Ivakhnenko	7	6
(Hungary) RL Jani (Sweden) C Lister	5	2
