= 2015 Al Habtoor Tennis Challenge – Doubles =

Doubles
- 2015 Al Habtoor Tennis Challenge

Final
- Champions: (Turkey) Çağla Büyükakçay (Greece) Maria Sakkari
- Runners-up: (Belgium) Elise Mertens (Turkey) İpek Soylu
- Score: 7–6^{(8–6)}, 6–4

Events
Singles	Doubles
← 2014 ·	Al Habtoor Tennis Challenge	· 2016 →

Vitalia Diatchenko and Alexandra Panova were the defending champions, but both players chose not to participate.

Çağla Büyükakçay and Maria Sakkari won the title, defeating Elise Mertens and İpek Soylu in the final, 7–6^{(8–6)}, 6–4.

== Seeds ==
1. (Belgium) Elise Mertens / (Turkey) İpek Soylu (final)
2. (Czech Republic) Klára Koukalová / (Czech Republic) Kateřina Vaňková (quarterfinals)
3. (Russia) Marina Melnikova / (Spain) Laura Pous Tió (semifinals)
4. (Ukraine) Olga Ianchuk / (Russia) Valentyna Ivakhnenko (first round)

== Draw ==
=== Key ===
- Q = Qualifier
- WC = Wild card
- LL = Lucky loser
- Alt = Alternate
- SE = Special exempt
- PR = Protected ranking
- ITF = ITF entry
- JE = Junior exempt
- w/o = Walkover
- r = Retired
- d = Defaulted
- SR = Special ranking

First round
1	(Belgium) E Mertens (Turkey) İ Soylu	6	6
(Russia) A Gabueva (India) A Raina	4	3
(Russia) P Leykina (Russia) N Vikhlyantseva	6	6
(Russia) E Lyukshinova (Egypt) S Samir	1	1
3	(Russia) M Melnikova (Spain) L Pous Tió	6	6
(Romania) N Dascălu (Russia) M Marfutina	2	1
WC	(Serbia) S Sabljarević (Germany) E Schwarte	0	4
WC	(Spain) C Sánchez Quintanar (Bulgaria) A Vangelova	6	6
(Turkey) Ç Büyükakçay (Greece) M Sakkari	6	6
(Oman) F Al-Nabhani (Switzerland) A Sadiković	4	3
(Slovakia) K Kučová (Czech Republic) T Martincová	6	7^{7}
4	(Ukraine) O Ianchuk (Russia) V Ivakhnenko	2	6^{4}
Alt	(Italy) C Coppola (Germany) V Heisen	3	0
(France) I Ramialison (Bulgaria) I Shinikova	6	6
WC	(Slovakia) Z Kučová (Slovakia) K Pondušová	1	1
2	(Czech Republic) K Koukalová (Czech Republic) K Vaňková	6	6

Quarterfinals
1	(Belgium) E Mertens (Turkey) İ Soylu	6	6
(Russia) P Leykina (Russia) N Vikhlyantseva	3	3
3	(Russia) M Melnikova (Spain) L Pous Tió	6	6
WC	(Spain) C Sánchez Quintanar (Bulgaria) A Vangelova	2	4
(Turkey) Ç Büyükakçay (Greece) M Sakkari	6	6
(Slovakia) K Kučová (Czech Republic) T Martincová	4	2
(France) I Ramialison (Bulgaria) I Shinikova	6	7
2	(Czech Republic) K Koukalová (Czech Republic) K Vaňková	4	5

Semifinals
1	(Belgium) E Mertens (Turkey) İ Soylu	6	6
3	(Russia) M Melnikova (Spain) L Pous Tió	2	3
(Turkey) Ç Büyükakçay (Greece) M Sakkari	6	4	[10]
(France) I Ramialison (Bulgaria) I Shinikova	3	6	[5]

Final
1	(Belgium) E Mertens (Turkey) İ Soylu	6^{6}	4
(Turkey) Ç Büyükakçay (Greece) M Sakkari	7^{8}	6
