= 2021 Al Habtoor Tennis Challenge =

Tennis tournament

- Date: 22–28 November 2021
- Edition: 24th
- Category: ITF Women's World Tennis Tour
- Prize money: $100,000+H
- Surface: Hard
- Location: Dubai, United Arab Emirates

Champions

Singles
- (Ukraine) Daria Snigur

Doubles
- (Kazakhstan) Anna Danilina / (Slovakia) Viktória Kužmová
← 2020 ·	Al Habtoor Tennis Challenge	· 2022 →

The 2021 Al Habtoor Tennis Challenge was a women's professional tennis tournament played on outdoor hard courts. It was the twenty-fourth edition of the tournament which was part of the 2021 ITF Women's World Tennis Tour. It took place in Dubai, United Arab Emirates between 22 and 28 November 2021.

== Singles main-draw entrants ==
=== Seeds ===
Country	Player	Rank^{1}	Seed
CHN	Zhang Shuai	63	1
CHN	Zheng Saisai	80	2
CHN	Wang Xinyu	99	3
SVK	Kristína Kučová	109	4
ROU	Ana Bogdan	112	5
BUL	Viktoriya Tomova	116	6
UKR	Lesia Tsurenko	119	7
SLO	Polona Hercog	135	8

- ^{1} Rankings are as of 15 November 2021.

=== Other entrants ===
The following players received wildcards into the singles main draw:

- (Kazakhstan) Anna Danilina
- (Poland) Weronika Falkowska
- (Israel) Lina Glushko
- (Egypt) Sandra Samir

The following player received entry using a protected ranking:

- (Russia) Vitalia Diatchenko

The following players received entry from the qualifying draw:

- (United Kingdom) Naiktha Bains
- (Ukraine) Kateryna Bondarenko
- (Romania) Ilona Georgiana Ghioroaie
- (Austria) Julia Grabher
- (Romania) Andreea Mitu
- (Russia) Oksana Selekhmeteva
- (Bulgaria) Isabella Shinikova
- (Indonesia) Aldila Sutjiadi

== Champions ==
=== Singles ===
- (Ukraine) Daria Snigur def. (Slovakia) Kristína Kučová, 6–3, 6–0

=== Doubles ===
- (Kazakhstan) Anna Danilina / (Slovakia) Viktória Kužmová def. (Russia) Angelina Gabueva / (Russia) Anastasia Zakharova, 4–6, 6–3, [10–2]
