= 2020 Al Habtoor Tennis Challenge =

Tennis tournament

- Date: 7–13 December 2020
- Edition: 23rd
- Category: ITF Women's World Tennis Tour
- Prize money: $100,000+H
- Surface: Hard
- Location: Dubai, United Arab Emirates

Champions

Singles
- (Romania) Sorana Cîrstea

Doubles
- (Georgia (country)) Ekaterine Gorgodze / (India) Ankita Raina
← 2019 ·	Al Habtoor Tennis Challenge	· 2021 →

The 2020 Al Habtoor Tennis Challenge was a women's professional tennis tournament played on outdoor hard courts. It was the twenty-third edition of the tournament which was part of the 2020 ITF Women's World Tennis Tour. It took place in Dubai, United Arab Emirates between 7 and 13 December 2020.

== Singles main-draw entrants ==
=== Seeds ===
Country	Player	Rank^{1}	Seed
FRA	Kristina Mladenovic	49	1
SLO	Polona Hercog	52	2
GBR	Heather Watson	59	3
RUS	Anna Blinkova	60	4
CZE	Kateřina Siniaková	64	5
CZE	Barbora Krejčíková	65	6
NED	Arantxa Rus	73	7
~~ITA~~	~~Camila Giorgi~~	~~75~~	~~8~~

- ^{1} Rankings are as of 30 November 2020.

=== Other entrants ===
The following players received wildcards into the singles main draw:

- (United Kingdom) Jodie Burrage
- (Hungary) Dalma Gálfi
- (Croatia) Ana Konjuh
- (India) Ankita Raina

The following players received entry from the qualifying draw:

- (Italy) Elisabetta Cocciaretto
- (Romania) Jaqueline Cristian
- (Israel) Mika Dagan Fruchtman
- (Poland) Magdalena Fręch
- (Georgia (country)) Ekaterine Gorgodze
- (Serbia) Aleksandra Krunić
- (Romania) Elena-Gabriela Ruse
- (Slovakia) Anna Karolína Schmiedlová

The following players received entry into the singles main draw as lucky losers:

- (Russia) Amina Anshba
- (Switzerland) Viktorija Golubic
- (Netherlands) Lesley Pattinama Kerkhove

== Champions ==
=== Singles ===
- (Romania) Sorana Cîrstea def. (Czech Republic) Kateřina Siniaková, 4–6, 6–3, 6–3

=== Doubles ===
- (Georgia (country)) Ekaterine Gorgodze / (India) Ankita Raina def. (Spain) Aliona Bolsova / (Slovenia) Kaja Juvan, 6–4, 3–6, [10–6]
