= 2021 Al Habtoor Tennis Challenge – Singles =

Singles
- 2021 Al Habtoor Tennis Challenge

Final
- Champion: (Ukraine) Daria Snigur
- Runner-up: (Slovakia) Kristína Kučová
- Score: 6–3, 6–0

Events
Singles	Doubles
← 2020 ·	Al Habtoor Tennis Challenge	· 2022 →

Sorana Cîrstea was the defending champion but chose not to participate.

Daria Snigur won the title, defeating Kristína Kučová in the final, 6–3, 6–0.

== Seeds ==
1. (China) Zhang Shuai (second round)
2. (China) Zheng Saisai (first round)
3. (China) Wang Xinyu (first round)
4. (Slovakia) Kristína Kučová (final)
5. (Romania) Ana Bogdan (first round)
6. (Bulgaria) Viktoriya Tomova (second round)
7. (Ukraine) Lesia Tsurenko (second round, retired)
8. (Slovenia) Polona Hercog (second round)

== Draw ==
=== Key ===
- Q = Qualifier
- WC = Wild card
- LL = Lucky loser
- Alt = Alternate
- SE = Special exempt
- PR = Protected ranking
- ITF = ITF entry
- JE = Junior exempt
- w/o = Walkover
- r = Retired
- d = Defaulted
- SR = Special ranking

=== Finals ===
Semifinals
(Russia) Anastasia Gasanova	6	1	3
(Ukraine) Daria Snigur	4	6	6
4	(Slovakia) Kristína Kučová	7^{10}	6
(Serbia) Aleksandra Krunić	6^{8}	0

Final
(Ukraine) Daria Snigur	6	6
4	(Slovakia) Kristína Kučová	3	0

=== Top half ===
First round
1	(China) S Zhang	6	7^{8}
(India) A Raina	1	6^{6}
(China) Q Zheng	6	7
Q	(United Kingdom) N Bains	1	5
WC	(Kazakhstan) A Danilina	1	4
(Russia) A Gasanova	6	6
WC	(Israel) L Glushko	3	5
7	(Ukraine) L Tsurenko	6	7
3	(China) Xin Wang	0	7^{7}	1
(Ukraine) D Snigur	6	6^{5}	6
Q	(Romania) A Mitu	3	0
Q	(Austria) J Grabher	6	6
(Slovakia) V Kužmová	5	6	6
(Japan) M Hontama	7	3	3
(Netherlands) L Pattinama Kerkhove	4	6	1
6	(Bulgaria) V Tomova	6	4	6

Second round
1	(China) S Zhang	7^{7}	1	4
(China) Q Zheng	6^{5}	6	6
(Russia) A Gasanova	4	6	4
7	(Ukraine) L Tsurenko	6	4	0^{r}
(Ukraine) D Snigur	6	6
Q	(Austria) J Grabher	0	1
(Slovakia) V Kužmová	6	4	7
6	(Bulgaria) V Tomova	2	6	5

Quarterfinals
(China) Q Zheng	1	3
(Russia) A Gasanova	6	6
(Ukraine) D Snigur	6	6^{4}	6
(Slovakia) V Kužmová	3	7^{7}	0

Semifinals
(Russia) A Gasanova	6	1	3
(Ukraine) D Snigur	4	6	6

=== Bottom half ===
First round
8	(Slovenia) P Hercog	1	6	6
WC	(Egypt) S Samir	6	3	1
(Russia) N Vikhlyantseva	3	6	3
PR	(Russia) V Diatchenko	6	2	6
(Belarus) Y Hatouka	6	7^{8}
Q	(Ukraine) K Bondarenko	2	6^{6}
WC	(Poland) W Falkowska	1	2
4	(Slovakia) K Kučová	6	6
5	(Romania) A Bogdan	6	6^{4}	0
(Serbia) A Krunić	4	7^{7}	6
Q	(Romania) IG Ghioroaie	2	6	6
Q	(Indonesia) A Sutjiadi	6	2	3
(Japan) M Hibi	4	6	6
Q	(Russia) O Selekhmeteva	6	4	4
Q	(Bulgaria) I Shinikova	6	7^{11}
2	(China) S Zheng	2	6^{9}

Second round
8	(Slovenia) P Hercog	3	3
PR	(Russia) V Diatchenko	6	6
(Belarus) Y Hatouka	4	1
4	(Slovakia) K Kučová	6	6
(Serbia) A Krunić	6	6
Q	(Romania) IG Ghioroaie	1	2
(Japan) M Hibi	4	3
Q	(Bulgaria) I Shinikova	6	6

Quarterfinals
PR	(Russia) V Diatchenko	6^{4}	6^{1}
4	(Slovakia) K Kučová	7^{7}	7^{7}
(Serbia) A Krunić	6	6
Q	(Bulgaria) I Shinikova	1	2

Semifinals
4	(Slovakia) K Kučová	7^{10}	6
(Serbia) A Krunić	6^{8}	0
