= 2014 Al Habtoor Tennis Challenge – Doubles =

Doubles
- 2014 Al Habtoor Tennis Challenge

Final
- Champions: (Russia) Vitalia Diatchenko (Russia) Alexandra Panova
- Runners-up: (Ukraine) Lyudmyla Kichenok (Ukraine) Olga Savchuk
- Score: 3–6, 6–2, [10–4]

Events
Singles	Doubles
← 2013 ·	Al Habtoor Tennis Challenge	· 2015 →

Vitalia Diatchenko and Olga Savchuk were the defending champions, having won the event in 2013, however they both chose to participate with different partners. Diatchenko partnered with Alexandra Panova and Savchuk partnered with Lyudmyla Kichenok and both faced each other in the final, with Diatchenko and Panova defeating Kichenok and Savchuk, 3–6, 6–2, [10–4].

== Seeds ==
1. (Ukraine) Lyudmyla Kichenok / (Ukraine) Olga Savchuk (final)
2. (Ukraine) Nadiia Kichenok / (Czech Republic) Renata Voráčová (semifinals)
3. (Russia) Vitalia Diatchenko / (Russia) Alexandra Panova (champion)
4. (Romania) Elena Bogdan / (United States) Nicole Melichar (quarterfinals)

== Draw ==
=== Key ===
- Q = Qualifier
- WC = Wild card
- LL = Lucky loser
- Alt = Alternate
- SE = Special exempt
- PR = Protected ranking
- ITF = ITF entry
- JE = Junior exempt
- w/o = Walkover
- r = Retired
- d = Defaulted
- SR = Special ranking

First round
1	(Ukraine) L Kichenok (Ukraine) O Savchuk	6	6
(France) I Ramialison (Bulgaria) V Tomova	2	3
(Austria) S Klemenschits (Germany) D Pfizenmaier	6	7
WC	(Czech Republic) J Malečková (Czech Republic) K Muchová	1	5
4	(Romania) E Bogdan (United States) N Melichar	6	6
Alt	(Nigeria) B Anuna (Ukraine) K Zueva	1	0
(Turkey) Ç Büyükakçay (Montenegro) D Kovinić	7^{7}	7^{7}
(Czech Republic) K Kramperová (Montenegro) A Veselinović	6^{1}	6^{3}
(Romania) D Buzean (Spain) L Pous Tió	6	3	[10]
WC	(Italy) C Coppola (Germany) V Heisen	3	6	[8]
(Slovakia) J Čepelová (Slovakia) C Škamlová	6	4	[3]
3	(Russia) V Diatchenko (Russia) A Panova	4	6	[10]
(Czech Republic) E Hrdinová (Czech Republic) T Smitková	3	6	[10]
(Bulgaria) J Stamatova (Russia) E Yashina	6	2	[3]
(United Kingdom) N Broady (Germany) C Witthöft	3	1
2	(Ukraine) N Kichenok (Czech Republic) R Voráčová	6	6

Quarterfinals
1	(Ukraine) L Kichenok (Ukraine) O Savchuk	6	6
(Austria) S Klemenschits (Germany) D Pfizenmaier	3	2
4	(Romania) E Bogdan (United States) N Melichar	3	6	[1]
(Turkey) Ç Büyükakçay (Montenegro) D Kovinić	6	3	[10]
(Romania) D Buzean (Spain) L Pous Tió	3	1
3	(Russia) V Diatchenko (Russia) A Panova	6	6
(Czech Republic) E Hrdinová (Czech Republic) T Smitková	4	2
2	(Ukraine) N Kichenok (Czech Republic) R Voráčová	6	6

Semifinals
1	(Ukraine) L Kichenok (Ukraine) O Savchuk	6	6
(Turkey) Ç Büyükakçay (Montenegro) D Kovinić	2	4
3	(Russia) V Diatchenko (Russia) A Panova	6	6
2	(Ukraine) N Kichenok (Czech Republic) R Voráčová	0	0

Final
1	(Ukraine) L Kichenok (Ukraine) O Savchuk	6	2	[4]
3	(Russia) V Diatchenko (Russia) A Panova	3	6	[10]
