= 2014 Al Habtoor Tennis Challenge – Singles =

Singles
- 2014 Al Habtoor Tennis Challenge

Final
- Champion: (Romania) Alexandra Dulgheru
- Runner-up: (Japan) Kimiko Date-Krumm
- Score: 6–3, 6–4

Events
Singles	Doubles
← 2013 ·	Al Habtoor Tennis Challenge	· 2015 →

Jana Čepelová was the defending champion, having won the event in 2013, however she lost in the first round to Alexandra Panova.

Alexandra Dulgheru won the title, defeating Kimiko Date-Krumm in the final, 6–3, 6–4.

== Seeds ==
1. (Slovakia) Jana Čepelová (first round)
2. (Belgium) Alison Van Uytvanck (quarterfinals)
3. (Czech Republic) Tereza Smitková (first round)
4. (Germany) Anna-Lena Friedsam (first round; retired)
5. (Germany) Carina Witthöft (second round)
6. (Romania) Alexandra Dulgheru (champion)
7. (Russia) Vitalia Diatchenko (semifinals)
8. (Montenegro) Danka Kovinić (first round)

== Main draw ==
=== Key ===
- Q = Qualifier
- WC = Wild card
- LL = Lucky loser
- Alt = Alternate
- SE = Special exempt
- PR = Protected ranking
- ITF = ITF entry
- JE = Junior exempt
- w/o = Walkover
- r = Retired
- d = Defaulted
- SR = Special ranking

=== Finals ===
Semifinals
(Ukraine) Nadiia Kichenok	1	4
(Japan) Kimiko Date-Krumm	6	6
6	(Romania) Alexandra Dulgheru	6	6
7	(Russia) Vitalia Diatchenko	3	3

Final
(Japan) Kimiko Date-Krumm	3	4
6	(Romania) Alexandra Dulgheru	6	6

=== Top half ===
First round
1	(Slovakia) J Čepelová	3	3
(Russia) A Panova	6	6
Q	(Bulgaria) V Tomova	1	7	6
(United Kingdom) N Broady	6	5	1
(Ukraine) M Zanevska	0^{r}
(Ukraine) N Kichenok	3
(Netherlands) R Hogenkamp	3	1
5	(Germany) C Witthöft	6	6
4	(Germany) A-L Friedsam	0^{r}
LL	(Romania) N-C Dascălu	1
WC	(Ukraine) O Savchuk	4	2
(Romania) A Mitu	6	6
WC	(United States) A Riley	0	0
(Japan) K Date-Krumm	6	6
(Spain) L Domínguez Lino	2	6	6
8	(Montenegro) D Kovinić	6	3	0

Second round
(Russia) A Panova	6	2	7^{7}
Q	(Bulgaria) V Tomova	2	6	6^{3}
(Ukraine) N Kichenok	7^{7}	7
5	(Germany) C Witthöft	6^{2}	5
LL	(Romania) N-C Dascălu	5	4
(Romania) A Mitu	7	6
(Japan) K Date-Krumm	6	6
(Spain) L Domínguez Lino	1	4

Quarterfinals
(Russia) A Panova	7^{7}	3	3
(Ukraine) N Kichenok	6^{5}	6	6
(Romania) A Mitu	3	6	0
(Japan) K Date-Krumm	6	1	6

Semifinals
(Ukraine) N Kichenok	1	4
(Japan) K Date-Krumm	6	6

=== Bottom half ===
First round
6	(Romania) A Dulgheru	6	6
(Turkey) Ç Büyükakçay	4	3
WC	(Spain) L Pous Tió	3	7^{7}	6
(Japan) M Doi	6	6^{5}	4
(Ukraine) L Kichenok	6	6
Q	(Czech Republic) K Kramperová	2	2
(Belgium) A-S Mestach	6	3	6
3	(Czech Republic) T Smitková	3	6	4
7	(Russia) V Diatchenko	7^{7}	6
(Slovakia) K Kučová	6^{5}	3
(Germany) D Pfizenmaier	4	6	6
WC	(Uzbekistan) A Amanmuradova	6	4	1
(Czech Republic) R Voráčová	7	7^{7}
Q	(France) A Hesse	5	6^{2}
Q	(France) I Ramialison	4	4
2	(Belgium) A Van Uytvanck	6	6

Second round
6	(Romania) A Dulgheru	6	6
WC	(Spain) L Pous Tió	0	0
(Ukraine) L Kichenok	4	4
(Belgium) A-S Mestach	6	6
7	(Russia) V Diatchenko	6	6
(Germany) D Pfizenmaier	3	0
(Czech Republic) R Voráčová	6	6^{3}	0
2	(Belgium) A Van Uytvanck	3	7^{7}	6

Quarterfinals
6	(Romania) A Dulgheru	6^{5}	6	7^{7}
(Belgium) A-S Mestach	7^{7}	2	6^{2}
7	(Russia) V Diatchenko	7	6
2	(Belgium) A Van Uytvanck	5	2

Semifinals
6	(Romania) A Dulgheru	6	6
7	(Russia) V Diatchenko	3	3
