= 2020 Al Habtoor Tennis Challenge – Doubles =

Doubles
- 2020 Al Habtoor Tennis Challenge

Final
- Champions: (Georgia (country)) Ekaterine Gorgodze (India) Ankita Raina
- Runners-up: (Spain) Aliona Bolsova (Slovenia) Kaja Juvan
- Score: 6–4, 3–6, [10–6]

Events
Singles	Doubles
← 2019 ·	Al Habtoor Tennis Challenge	· 2021 →

Lucie Hradecká and Andreja Klepač were the defending champions but Hradecká chose not to participate. Klepač partnered Kirsten Flipkens, but lost in the quarterfinals to Ekaterine Gorgodze and Ankita Raina.

Gorgodze and Raina went on to win the title, defeating Aliona Bolsova and Kaja Juvan in the final, 6–4, 3–6, [10–6].

== Seeds ==
1. (Hungary) Tímea Babos / (France) Kristina Mladenovic (quarterfinals, withdrew)
2. (Belgium) Kirsten Flipkens / (Slovenia) Andreja Klepač (quarterfinals)
3. (Netherlands) Arantxa Rus / (Netherlands) Rosalie van der Hoek (quarterfinals)
4. (Belarus) Lidziya Marozava / (Netherlands) Lesley Pattinama Kerkhove (first round)

== Draw ==
=== Key ===
- Q = Qualifier
- WC = Wild card
- LL = Lucky loser
- Alt = Alternate
- SE = Special exempt
- PR = Protected ranking
- ITF = ITF entry
- JE = Junior exempt
- w/o = Walkover
- r = Retired
- d = Defaulted
- SR = Special ranking

=== Draw ===
First round
1	(Hungary) T Babos (France) K Mladenovic	6	6
WC	(Georgia (country)) S Shapatava (United Kingdom) E Webley-Smith	2	0
(Italy) E Cocciaretto (Italy) J Paolini	2	6	[6]
(Spain) A Bolsova (Slovenia) K Juvan	6	2	[10]
4	(Belarus) L Marozava (Netherlands) L Pattinama Kerkhove	6	3	[5]
WC	(Hungary) D Gálfi (Slovakia) T Mihalíková	2	6	[10]
(Poland) M Fręch (Germany) J Wachaczyk	6	5	[7]
(Switzerland) V Golubic (Switzerland) S Vögele	1	7	[10]
(Russia) A Blinkova (United Kingdom) H Watson	6	6
(Spain) G García Pérez (China) Xiy Wang	2	4
WC	(Romania) J Cristian (Romania) E-G Ruse	3	6	[4]
3	(Netherlands) A Rus (Netherlands) R van der Hoek	6	3	[10]
(Georgia (country)) E Gorgodze (India) A Raina	7^{7}	6
(Hungary) RL Jani (Serbia) A Krunić	6^{5}	3
(Russia) M Gasparyan (Montenegro) D Kovinić	0	3
2	(Belgium) K Flipkens (Slovenia) A Klepač	6	6

Quarterfinals
1	(Hungary) T Babos (France) K Mladenovic
(Spain) A Bolsova (Slovenia) K Juvan	w/o
WC	(Hungary) D Gálfi (Slovakia) T Mihalíková	w/o
(Switzerland) V Golubic (Switzerland) S Vögele
(Russia) A Blinkova (United Kingdom) H Watson	7	6
3	(Netherlands) A Rus (Netherlands) R van der Hoek	5	4
(Georgia (country)) E Gorgodze (India) A Raina	7^{7}	6
2	(Belgium) K Flipkens (Slovenia) A Klepač	6^{3}	1

Semifinals
(Spain) A Bolsova (Slovenia) K Juvan	7^{7}	6
WC	(Hungary) D Gálfi (Slovakia) T Mihalíková	6^{2}	3
(Russia) A Blinkova (United Kingdom) H Watson	7^{7}	3	[2]
(Georgia (country)) E Gorgodze (India) A Raina	6^{1}	6	[10]

Final
(Spain) A Bolsova (Slovenia) K Juvan	4	6	[6]
(Georgia (country)) E Gorgodze (India) A Raina	6	3	[10]
