= 2016 Al Habtoor Tennis Challenge – Singles =

Singles
- 2016 Al Habtoor Tennis Challenge

Final
- Champion: (Chinese Taipei) Hsieh Su-wei
- Runner-up: (Russia) Natalia Vikhlyantseva
- Score: 6–2, 6–2

Events
Singles	Doubles
← 2015 ·	Al Habtoor Tennis Challenge	· 2017 →

Çağla Büyükakçay was the defending champion, but lost in the first round to Ksenia Pervak.

== Seeds ==
1. (Turkey) Çağla Büyükakçay (first round)
2. (Slovakia) Kristína Kučová (first round)
3. (Russia) Evgeniya Rodina (first round)
4. (Luxembourg) Mandy Minella (first round)
5. (Chinese Taipei) Hsieh Su-wei (champion)
6. (Slovakia) Rebecca Šramková (first round)
7. (Belarus) Aryna Sabalenka (first round)
8. (Netherlands) Cindy Burger (first round)

== Main draw ==
=== Key ===
- Q = Qualifier
- WC = Wild card
- LL = Lucky loser
- Alt = Alternate
- SE = Special exempt
- PR = Protected ranking
- ITF = ITF entry
- JE = Junior exempt
- w/o = Walkover
- r = Retired
- d = Defaulted
- SR = Special ranking

=== Finals ===
Semifinals
5	(Chinese Taipei) Hsieh Su-wei	3	7	6
(Germany) Mona Barthel	6	5	1
Q	(Netherlands) Lesley Kerkhove	1	6^{5}
(Russia) Natalia Vikhlyantseva	6	7^{7}

Final
5	(Chinese Taipei) Hsieh Su-wei	6	6
(Russia) Natalia Vikhlyantseva	2	2

=== Top half ===
First round
1	(Turkey) Ç Büyükakçay	0	6^{1}
PR	(Russia) K Pervak	6	7^{7}
(Serbia) A Krunić	6	6
(Sweden) S Celik	2	4
WC	(Oman) F Al-Nabhani	0	0
Q	(Netherlands) Q Lemoine	6	6
(Bulgaria) V Tomova	3	3
5	(Chinese Taipei) S-w Hsieh	6	6
3	(Russia) E Rodina	6^{3}	4
(Germany) M Barthel	7^{7}	6
(Serbia) N Stojanović	6	6
(Bulgaria) E Kostova	4	3
(Serbia) I Jorović	6	6
Q	(Ukraine) A Vasylyeva	4	1
WC	(Russia) O Pervushina	6	7^{7}
8	(Netherlands) C Burger	4	6^{3}

Second round
PR	(Russia) K Pervak	4	6^{4}
(Serbia) A Krunić	6	7^{7}
Q	(Netherlands) Q Lemoine	1	4
5	(Chinese Taipei) S-w Hsieh	6	6
(Germany) M Barthel	2	6	6
(Serbia) N Stojanović	6	1	2
(Serbia) I Jorović	6	6
WC	(Russia) O Pervushina	4	3

Quarterfinals
(Serbia) A Krunić	1	2
5	(Chinese Taipei) S-w Hsieh	6	6
(Germany) M Barthel	6	6
(Serbia) I Jorović	3	4

Semifinals
5	(Chinese Taipei) S-w Hsieh	3	7	6
(Germany) M Barthel	6	5	1

=== Bottom half ===
First round
6	(Slovakia) R Šramková	6	6^{7}	5
(Slovenia) T Majerič	0	7^{9}	7
Q	(Netherlands) L Kerkhove	7	6
(Russia) V Kamenskaya	5	2
(Uzbekistan) S Sharipova	7	6
WC	(Croatia) J Fett	5	3
(Uzbekistan) N Abduraimova	6	7
4	(Luxembourg) M Minella	1	5
7	(Belarus) A Sabalenka	7	4	4
(Hungary) D Gálfi	5	6	6
(Russia) N Vikhlyantseva	6	4	6
(United Kingdom) T Moore	1	6	1
(Austria) B Haas	3	6	7
Q	(Switzerland) P Schnyder	6	3	5
WC	(Kazakhstan) G Voskoboeva	6	6
2	(Slovakia) K Kučová	3	2

Second round
(Slovenia) T Majerič	2	2
Q	(Netherlands) L Kerkhove	6	6
(Uzbekistan) S Sharipova	6	6
(Uzbekistan) N Abduraimova	4	3
(Hungary) D Gálfi	7	2	1
(Russia) N Vikhlyantseva	5	6	6
(Austria) B Haas	3	6	4
WC	(Kazakhstan) G Voskoboeva	6	4	6

Quarterfinals
Q	(Netherlands) L Kerkhove	6	6
(Uzbekistan) S Sharipova	2	3
(Russia) N Vikhlyantseva	6	6
WC	(Kazakhstan) G Voskoboeva	3	1

Semifinals
Q	(Netherlands) L Kerkhove	1	6^{5}
(Russia) N Vikhlyantseva	6	7^{7}
