= 2015 Al Habtoor Tennis Challenge =

- Date: 9–15 November
- Edition: 18th
- Category: ITF Women's Circuit
- Prize money: $75,000
- Surface: Hard
- Location: Dubai, United Arab Emirates

Champions

Singles
- (Turkey) Çağla Büyükakçay

Doubles
- (Turkey) Çağla Büyükakçay / (Greece) Maria Sakkari
- Al Habtoor Tennis Challenge

The 2015 Al Habtoor Tennis Challenge was a professional tennis tournament played on outdoor hard courts. It was the eighteenth edition of the tournament and part of the 2015 ITF Women's Circuit, offering a total of $75,000 in prize money. It took place in Dubai, United Arab Emirates, on 9–15 November 2015.

== Singles main draw entrants ==
=== Seeds ===
Country	Player	Rank^{1}	Seed
ROU	Alexandra Dulgheru	57	1
CZE	Klára Koukalová	107	2
RUS	Alexandra Panova	135	3
SVK	Kristína Kučová	150	4
BEL	Elise Mertens	158	5
TUR	Çağla Büyükakçay	160	6
TUR	İpek Soylu	169	7
GRE	Maria Sakkari	187	8

- ^{1} Rankings as of 2 November 2015

=== Other entrants ===
The following players received wildcards into the singles main draw:

- (Italy) Claudia Coppola
- (Ukraine) Olga Fridman
- (Bosnia and Herzegovina) Dea Herdželaš
- (Bulgaria) Isabella Shinikova

The following players received entry from the qualifying draw:

- (Romania) Nicoleta Dascălu
- (Russia) Maria Marfutina
- (Egypt) Sandra Samir
- (Spain) Cristina Sánchez Quintanar

== Champions ==
=== Singles ===
- (Turkey) Çağla Büyükakçay def. (Czech Republic) Klára Koukalová, 6–7^{(4–7)}, 6–4, 6–4

=== Doubles ===
- (Turkey) Çağla Büyükakçay / (Greece) Maria Sakkari def. (Belgium) Elise Mertens / (Turkey) İpek Soylu, 7–6^{(8–6)}, 6–4
