= 2016 Al Habtoor Tennis Challenge =

- Date: 12–18 December
- Edition: 19th
- Category: ITF Women's Circuit
- Prize money: $100,000+H
- Surface: Hard
- Location: Dubai, United Arab Emirates

Champions

Singles
- (Chinese Taipei) Hsieh Su-wei

Doubles
- (Luxembourg) Mandy Minella / (Serbia) Nina Stojanović
- Al Habtoor Tennis Challenge

The 2016 Al Habtoor Tennis Challenge was a professional tennis tournament played on outdoor hard courts. It was the nineteenth edition of the tournament and part of the 2016 ITF Women's Circuit, offering a total of $100,000+H in prize money. It took place in Dubai, United Arab Emirates, on 12–18 December 2016.

== Singles main draw entrants ==
=== Seeds ===
Country	Player	Rank^{1}	Seed
TUR	Çağla Büyükakçay	77	1
SVK	Kristína Kučová	82	2
RUS	Evgeniya Rodina	86	3
LUX	Mandy Minella	104	4
TPE	Hsieh Su-wei	108	5
SVK	Rebecca Šramková	121	6
BLR	Aryna Sabalenka	135	7
NED	Cindy Burger	138	8

- ^{1} Rankings as of 5 December 2015

=== Other entrants ===
The following players received wildcards into the singles main draw:

- (Oman) Fatma Al-Nabhani
- (Croatia) Jana Fett
- (Russia) Olesya Pervushina
- (Kazakhstan) Galina Voskoboeva

The following players received entry from the qualifying draw:

- (Netherlands) Lesley Kerkhove
- (Netherlands) Quirine Lemoine
- (Switzerland) Patty Schnyder
- (Ukraine) Anastasiya Vasylyeva

The following player received entry by using protected rankings:

- (Russia) Ksenia Pervak

== Champions ==
=== Singles ===
- (Chinese Taipei) Hsieh Su-wei def. (Russia) Natalia Vikhlyantseva, 6–2, 6–2

=== Doubles ===
- (Luxembourg) Mandy Minella / (Serbia) Nina Stojanović def. (Chinese Taipei) Hsieh Su-wei / (Russia) Valeria Savinykh, 6–3, 3–6, [10–4]
