= 2020 Al Habtoor Tennis Challenge – Singles =

Singles
- 2020 Al Habtoor Tennis Challenge

Final
- Champion: (Romania) Sorana Cîrstea
- Runner-up: (Czech Republic) Kateřina Siniaková
- Score: 4–6, 6–3, 6–3

Events
Singles	Doubles
← 2019 ·	Al Habtoor Tennis Challenge	· 2021 →

Ana Bogdan was the defending champion but chose not to participate.

Sorana Cîrstea won the title, defeating Kateřina Siniaková in the final, 4–6, 6–3, 6–3.

== Seeds ==
1. (France) Kristina Mladenovic (second round, retired)
2. (Slovenia) Polona Hercog (semifinals)
3. (United Kingdom) Heather Watson (quarterfinals)
4. (Russia) Anna Blinkova (first round)
5. (Czech Republic) Kateřina Siniaková (final)
6. (Czech Republic) Barbora Krejčíková (quarterfinals)
7. (Netherlands) Arantxa Rus (quarterfinals)
8. (Italy) Camila Giorgi (withdrew)

== Draw ==
=== Key ===
- Q = Qualifier
- WC = Wild card
- LL = Lucky loser
- Alt = Alternate
- SE = Special exempt
- PR = Protected ranking
- ITF = ITF entry
- JE = Junior exempt
- w/o = Walkover
- r = Retired
- d = Defaulted
- SR = Special ranking

=== Finals ===
Semifinals
Q	(Romania) Elena-Gabriela Ruse	3	7^{7}	4
5	(Czech Republic) Kateřina Siniaková	6	6^{2}	6
(Romania) Sorana Cîrstea	7	4	7
2	(Slovenia) Polona Hercog	5	6	5

Final
5	(Czech Republic) Kateřina Siniaková	6	3	3
(Romania) Sorana Cîrstea	4	6	6

=== Top half ===
First round
1	(France) K Mladenovic	6	7
Q	(Poland) M Fręch	4	5
(Slovenia) K Juvan	2	7^{8}	1
Q	(Romania) E-G Ruse	6	6^{6}	6
WC	(United Kingdom) J Burrage	4	2
LL	(Netherlands) L Pattinama Kerkhove	6	6
(Montenegro) D Kovinić	6	6
Q	(Romania) J Cristian	1	3
3	(United Kingdom) H Watson	6	7^{7}
Q	(Serbia) A Krunić	0	6^{3}
(Belgium) K Flipkens	6	6
LL	(Russia) A Anshba	2	2
Q	(Slovakia) AK Schmiedlová	4	6	6
Q	(Georgia (country)) E Gorgodze	6	2	3
WC	(India) A Raina	6	2	2
5	(Czech Republic) K Siniaková	1	6	6

Second round
1	(France) K Mladenovic	2^{r}
Q	(Romania) E-G Ruse	2
LL	(Netherlands) L Pattinama Kerkhove	6^{5}	2
(Montenegro) D Kovinić	7^{7}	6
3	(United Kingdom) H Watson	6	6
(Belgium) K Flipkens	4	2
Q	(Slovakia) AK Schmiedlová	2	2
5	(Czech Republic) K Siniaková	6	6

Quarterfinals
Q	(Romania) E-G Ruse	6	6
(Montenegro) D Kovinić	1	4
3	(United Kingdom) H Watson	2	5
5	(Czech Republic) K Siniaková	6	7

Semifinals
Q	(Romania) E-G Ruse	3	7^{7}	4
5	(Czech Republic) K Siniaková	6	6^{2}	6

=== Bottom half ===
First round
6	(Czech Republic) B Krejčíková	6	6
LL	(Switzerland) V Golubic	1	2
WC	(Hungary) D Gálfi	6	6
Q	(Israel) M Dagan Fruchtman	3	1
Q	(Italy) E Cocciaretto	5	6	7
(Italy) J Paolini	7	2	5
(Romania) S Cîrstea	6	6
4	(Russia) A Blinkova	2	1
7	(Netherlands) A Rus	6	6
WC	(Croatia) A Konjuh	1	2
(Hungary) T Babos	3	6	1
(China) Xiy Wang	6	2	6
(Spain) A Bolsova	6	6
(France) O Dodin	2	4
(Slovakia) V Kužmová	5	3
2	(Slovenia) P Hercog	7	6

Second round
6	(Czech Republic) B Krejčíková	6	6
WC	(Hungary) D Gálfi	2	4
Q	(Italy) E Cocciaretto	0	3
(Romania) S Cîrstea	6	6
7	(Netherlands) A Rus	6	6
(China) Xiy Wang	1	3
(Spain) A Bolsova	2	6^{3}
2	(Slovenia) P Hercog	6	7^{7}

Quarterfinals
6	(Czech Republic) B Krejčíková	6^{5}	6	3
(Romania) S Cîrstea	7^{7}	1	6
7	(Netherlands) A Rus	2	4
2	(Slovenia) P Hercog	6	6

Semifinals
(Romania) S Cîrstea	7	4	7
2	(Slovenia) P Hercog	5	6	5
