= Alena Fomina-Klotz =

Russian tennis player (born 1989)

Alena Fomina-Klotz Алёна Фомина
- Full name: Alena Sergeyevna Fomina-Klotz
- Country (sports): Ukraine (2005–2017); Russia (2017–2025); Germany (2025–present)
- Born: 5 July 1989 (age 37) Sevastopol, Soviet Union
- Plays: Right-handed (two-handed backhand)
- Prize money: $155,519

Singles
- Career record: 166–196
- Career titles: 1 ITF
- Highest ranking: No. 520 (3 April 2017)

Doubles
- Career record: 323–267
- Career titles: 1 WTA Challenger, 27 ITF
- Highest ranking: No. 102 (24 July 2023)
- Current ranking: No. 829 (17 November 2025)
- Last updated on: 19 November 2025.

Alena Sergeyevna Fomina-Klotz (née Fomina; Russian: Алёна Сергеевна Фомина; born 5 July 1989) is a German tennis player. From 2005 to October 2017, she represented Ukraine. From 2017 to 2025, she represented Russia.

== Career ==
She has won one singles title and 27 doubles titles on the ITF Women's Circuit. On 3 April 2017, she reached a career-high singles ranking of world No. 520. On 24 July 2023, she peaked at No. 102 in the WTA doubles rankings.

Fomina made her WTA Tour debut at the 2014 Topshelf Open, partnering Christina Shakovets in doubles, but lost her first-round match against Maria Kirilenko and Yanina Wickmayer.

Partnering Cristina Bucșa, she won the doubles title at the WTA 125 2023 Grand Est Open 88, defeating Amina Anshba and Anastasia Dețiuc in the final.

== WTA Challenger finals ==
=== Doubles: 2 (1 title, 1 runner-up) ===
Result	W–L	Date	Tournament	Surface	Partner	Opponents	Score
Loss	0–1	Jul 2021	Belgrade Challenger, Serbia	Clay	(Russia) Ekaterina Yashina	(Belarus) Olga Govortsova (Belarus) Lidziya Marozava	2–6, 2–6
Win	1–1	Jul 2023	Contrexéville Open, France	Clay	(Spain) Cristina Bucșa	Amina Anshba (Czech Republic) Anastasia Dețiuc	4–6, 6–3, [10–7]

== ITF Circuit finals ==
=== Singles: 3 (1 title, 2 runner-ups) ===
Legend
$10/15,000 tournaments (1–2)

Result	W–L	Date	Tournament	Tier	Surface	Opponent	Score
Win	1–0	Aug 2014	ITF Telavi, Georgia	10,000	Clay	(Israel) Saray Sterenbach	6–4, 6–2
Loss	1–1	Apr 2016	ITF Manisa, Turkey	10,000	Clay	(North Macedonia) Lina Gjorcheska	1–6, 2–6
Loss	1–2	Jan 2017	ITF Antalya, Turkey	15,000	Clay	(Romania) Raluca Șerban	2–6, 3–6

=== Doubles: 49 (27 titles, 22 runner-ups) ===
Legend
$100,000 tournaments (3–0)
$80,000 tournaments (0–1)
$50/60,000 tournaments (2–3)
$40,000 tournaments (1–2)
$25,000 tournaments (3–6)
$10/15,000 tournaments (18–10)

Result	W–L	Date	Tournament	Tier	Surface	Partner	Opponents	Score
Loss	0–1	Sep 2012	Batumi Ladies Open, Georgia	15,000	Hard	(Ukraine) Anna Shkudun	(Russia) Yuliya Kalabina (Russia) Eugeniya Pashkova	6–7^{(5–7)}, 1–6
Loss	0–2	Oct 2012	ITF Antalya, Turkey	10,000	Clay	(North Macedonia) Lina Gjorcheska	(France) Anaïs Laurendon (Czech Republic) Kateřina Vaňková	2–6, 4–6
Win	1–2	Oct 2012	ITF Antalya, Turkey	10,000	Clay	(North Macedonia) Lina Gjorcheska	(Italy) Alice Matteucci (Poland) Barbara Sobaszkiewicz	6–0, 6–4
Loss	1–3	Mar 2013	ITF Antalya, Turkey	10,000	Clay	(Georgia (country)) Sofia Shapatava	(United States) Anamika Bhargava (United States) Nicole Melichar	7–6^{(9–7)}, 3–6, [7–10]
Loss	1–4	Jul 2013	ITF Istanbul, Turkey	25,000	Hard	(Slovenia) Anja Prislan	(Georgia (country)) Oksana Kalashnikova (Ukraine) Lyudmyla Kichenok	2–6, 6–4, [7–10]
Win	2–4	Aug 2013	ITF Moscow, Russia	25,000	Clay	(Ukraine) Anna Shkudun	(Uzbekistan) Albina Khabibulina (Ukraine) Anastasiya Vasylyeva	6–2, 7–5
Loss	2–5	Sep 2013	Trabzon Cup, Turkey	50,000	Hard	(Germany) Christina Shakovets	(Ukraine) Yuliya Beygelzimer (Ukraine) Maryna Zanevska	3–6, 1–6
Loss	2–6	Sep 2013	Batumi Ladies Open, Georgia	25,000	Hard	(Germany) Christina Shakovets	(Ukraine) Valentyna Ivakhnenko (Ukraine) Kateryna Kozlova	0–6, 4–6
Win	3–6	Nov 2013	ITF Sharm El Sheikh, Egypt	10,000	Hard	(Germany) Christina Shakovets	(Italy) Giulia Bruzzone (France) Pauline Payet	7–5, 6–4
Loss	3–7	May 2014	ITF Antalya, Turkey	10,000	Hard	(Chinese Taipei) Lee Pei-chi	(Mexico) Victoria Rodríguez (Mexico) Marcela Zacarías	4–6, 6–4, [5–10]
Loss	3–8	Jun 2014	ITF Adana, Turkey	10,000	Hard	(Russia) Ekaterina Tsiklauri	(Turkey) Başak Eraydın (Turkey) İpek Soylu	3–6, 1–6
Loss	3–9	Aug 2014	ITF Telavi, Georgia	10,000	Clay	(Belgium) India Maggen	(Russia) Yuliya Kalabina (Moldova) Anastasia Vdovenco	6–7^{(4–7)}, 2–6
Win	4–9	Aug 2014	ITF Telavi, Georgia	10,000	Clay	(Germany) Christina Shakovets	(Armenia) Ani Amiraghyan (Russia) Margarita Lazareva	6–4, 4–6, [10–7]
Win	5–9	Aug 2014	ITF Antalya, Turkey	10,000	Hard	(Germany) Christina Shakovets	(China) Wang Yan (China) Yang Zhaoxuan	6–3, 6–1
Win	6–9	Nov 2014	ITF Antalya, Turkey	10,000	Clay	(Georgia (country)) Ekaterine Gorgodze	(Serbia) Natalija Kostić (Slovakia) Chantal Škamlová	w/o
Win	7–9	Apr 2015	ITF Antalya, Turkey	10,000	Hard	(Slovakia) Chantal Škamlová	(Russia) Ksenia Gaydarzhi (Australia) Sara Tomic	6–2, 6–1
Loss	7–10	Jun 2015	ITF Moscow, Russia	25,000	Clay	(Ukraine) Anastasiya Vasylyeva	(Russia) Irina Khromacheva (Russia) Polina Leykina	5–7, 5–7
Loss	7–11	Jul 2015	Reinert Open Versmold, Germany	50,000	Clay	(Ukraine) Sofiya Kovalets	(Czech Republic) Eva Hrdinová (Israel) Shahar Pe'er	1–6, 3–6
Loss	7–12	Jul 2015	ITF Aschaffenburg, Germany	25,000	Clay	(Ukraine) Sofiya Kovalets	(Latvia) Diāna Marcinkēviča (Ukraine) Alyona Sotnikova	6–3, 4–6, [5–10]
Win	8–12	Aug 2015	ITF Antalya, Turkey	10,000	Hard	(Germany) Alina Wessel	(Germany) Kim Grajdek (Israel) Keren Shlomo	6–3, 6–3
Win	9–12	Sep 2015	ITF Bucha, Ukraine	10,000	Clay	(Ukraine) Oleksandra Korashvili	(Ukraine) Olga Ianchuk (Russia) Victoria Kan	6–4, 6–3
Loss	9–13	Nov 2015	ITF Antalya, Turkey	10,000	Clay	(Germany) Christina Shakovets	(North Macedonia) Lina Gjorcheska (Croatia) Iva Primorac	4–6, 6–4, [11–13]
Loss	9–14	Dec 2015	ITF Antalya, Turkey	10,000	Clay	(Georgia (country)) Sofia Kvatsabaia	(Germany) Christina Shakovets (Ukraine) Alyona Sotnikova	5–7, 4–6
Win	10–14	Dec 2015	ITF Antalya, Turkey	10,000	Clay	(Germany) Christina Shakovets	(Denmark) Julie Noe (Romania) Elena Ruse	7–6^{(7–4)}, 6–2
Win	11–14	Mar 2016	ITF Sharm El Sheikh, Egypt	10,000	Hard	(Russia) Ekaterina Yashina	(Russia) Anastasiya Komardina (Russia) Anna Morgina	6–1, 4–6, [10–8]
Win	12–14	Mar 2016	ITF Sharm El Sheikh, Egypt	10,000	Hard	(Russia) Ekaterina Yashina	(Russia) Anastasiya Komardina (Russia) Anna Morgina	7–6^{(7–2)}, 3–6, [10–8]
Win	13–14	Sep 2016	Batumi Ladies Open, Georgia	10,000	Clay	(Russia) Margarita Lazareva	(Georgia (country)) Mariam Bolkvadze (Georgia (country)) Tatia Mikadze	6–4, 6–3
Loss	13–15	Oct 2016	ITF Sharm El Sheikh, Egypt	10,000	Hard	(Russia) Anna Morgina	(Sweden) Jacqueline Cabaj Awad (Romania) Jaqueline Cristian	3–6, 5–7
Win	14–15	Oct 2016	ITF Sharm El Sheikh, Egypt	10,000	Hard	(Georgia (country)) Mariam Bolkvadze	(Argentina) Guadalupe Pérez Rojas (Switzerland) Jil Teichmann	6–2, 6–3
Win	15–15	Oct 2016	Soho Square Tournament, Egypt	100,000	Hard	(Romania) Irina Bara	(Argentina) Guadalupe Pérez Rojas (Switzerland) Jil Teichmann	6–2, 6–1
Win	16–15	Jun 2017	ITF Niš, Serbia	15,000	Clay	(Russia) Daria Kruzhkova	(India) Riya Bhatia (Australia) Angelique Svinos	6–0, 7–5
Loss	16–16	Jul 2017	ITF Prague Open, Czech Republic	80,000	Clay	(Romania) Mihaela Buzărnescu	(Russia) Anastasia Potapova (Ukraine) Dayana Yastremska	2–6, 2–6
Loss	16–17	Nov 2017	Internazionali di Ortisei, Italy	15,000	Hard (i)	(Russia) Ekaterina Kazionova	(Belgium) Hélène Scholsen (Russia) Alina Silich	3–6, 5–7
Win	17–17	Dec 2017	Dubai Tennis Challenge, United Arab Emirates	100,000	Hard	(Romania) Mihaela Buzărnescu	(Netherlands) Lesley Kerkhove (Belarus) Lidziya Marozava	6–4, 6–3
Win	18–17	Mar 2018	ITF Kazan, Russia	15,000	Hard (i)	(Russia) Elena Rybakina	(Russia) Anastasia Frolova (Russia) Ksenia Lykina	6–4, 1–6, [10–6]
Win	19–17	Aug 2018	ITF Kazan, Russia	15,000	Clay	(Russia) Daria Kruzhkova	(Russia) Anna Iakovleva (Russia) Gyulnara Nazarova	6–2, 6–1
Win	20–17	Oct 2018	ITF Antalya, Turkey	15,000	Hard	(Romania) Georgia Crăciun	(Turkey) Cemre Anıl (Turkey) Melis Sezer	7–5, 7–6^{(7–4)}
Win	21–17	Dec 2018	Dubai Tennis Challenge, United Arab Emirates (2)	100,000	Hard	(Russia) Valentyna Ivakhnenko	(Hungary) Réka Luca Jani (Sweden) Cornelia Lister	7–5, 6–2
Loss	21–18	Jan 2019	ITF Kazan, Russia	25,000	Hard (i)	(Russia) Ekaterina Yashina	(Germany) Vivian Heisen (Ukraine) Hanna Poznikhirenko	4–6, 3–6
Win	22–18	Mar 2019	ITF Pula, Italy	25,000	Clay	(Russia) Valentyna Ivakhnenko	(Hungary) Réka Luca Jani (Romania) Cristina Dinu	7–5, 3–6, [10–8]
Loss	22–19	Jun 2019	Bredeney Ladies Open, Germany	25,000	Clay	(Czech Republic) Anastasia Zarycká	(North Macedonia) Lina Gjorcheska (Russia) Anastasiya Komardina	3–6, 3–6
Win	23–19	Jul 2019	ITF Stuttgart, Germany	25,000	Clay	(Slovakia) Vivien Juhászová	(Serbia) Tamara Čurović (United States) Chiara Scholl	2–6, 6–2, [14–12]
Win	24–19	Jan 2020	ITF Stuttgart, Germany	15,000	Hard (i)	(Italy) Angelica Moratelli	(Czech Republic) Karolína Beranková (Portugal) Francisca Jorge	7–5, 6–2
Win	25–19	May 2022	Grado Tennis Cup, Italy	60,000	Clay	(Slovenia) Dalila Jakupović	(Hong Kong) Eudice Chong (Chinese Taipei) Liang En-shuo	6–1, 6–4
Win	26–19	Jan 2023	ITF Monastir, Tunisia	40,000	Hard	(Belarus) Iryna Shymanovich	(Romania) Oana Gavrila (Greece) Sapfo Sakellaridi	6–2, 6–1
Loss	26–20	Jan 2023	ITF Monastir, Tunisia	40,000	Hard	(Belarus) Iryna Shymanovich	(Burundi) Sada Nahimana (Romania) Andreea Prisăcariu	5–7, 4–6
Loss	26–21	Mar 2023	ITF Ricany, Czech Republic	40,000	Hard	(Uzbekistan) Nigina Abduraimova	(Germany) Tayisiya Morderger (Germany) Yana Morderger	1–6, 6–4, [6–10]
Loss	26–22	Jun 2023	Internazionali di Brescia, Italy	60,000	Clay	(Australia) Olivia Tjandramulia	(Japan) Mai Hontama (Japan) Moyuka Uchijima	1–6, 0–6
Win	27–22	Aug 2023	Ladies Open Hechingen, Germany	60,000	Clay	(North Macedonia) Lina Gjorcheska	(Georgia (country)) Ekaterine Gorgodze (Germany) Katharina Hobgarski	6–2, 6–4
