= Cornelia Lister =

Swedish tennis player (born 1994)

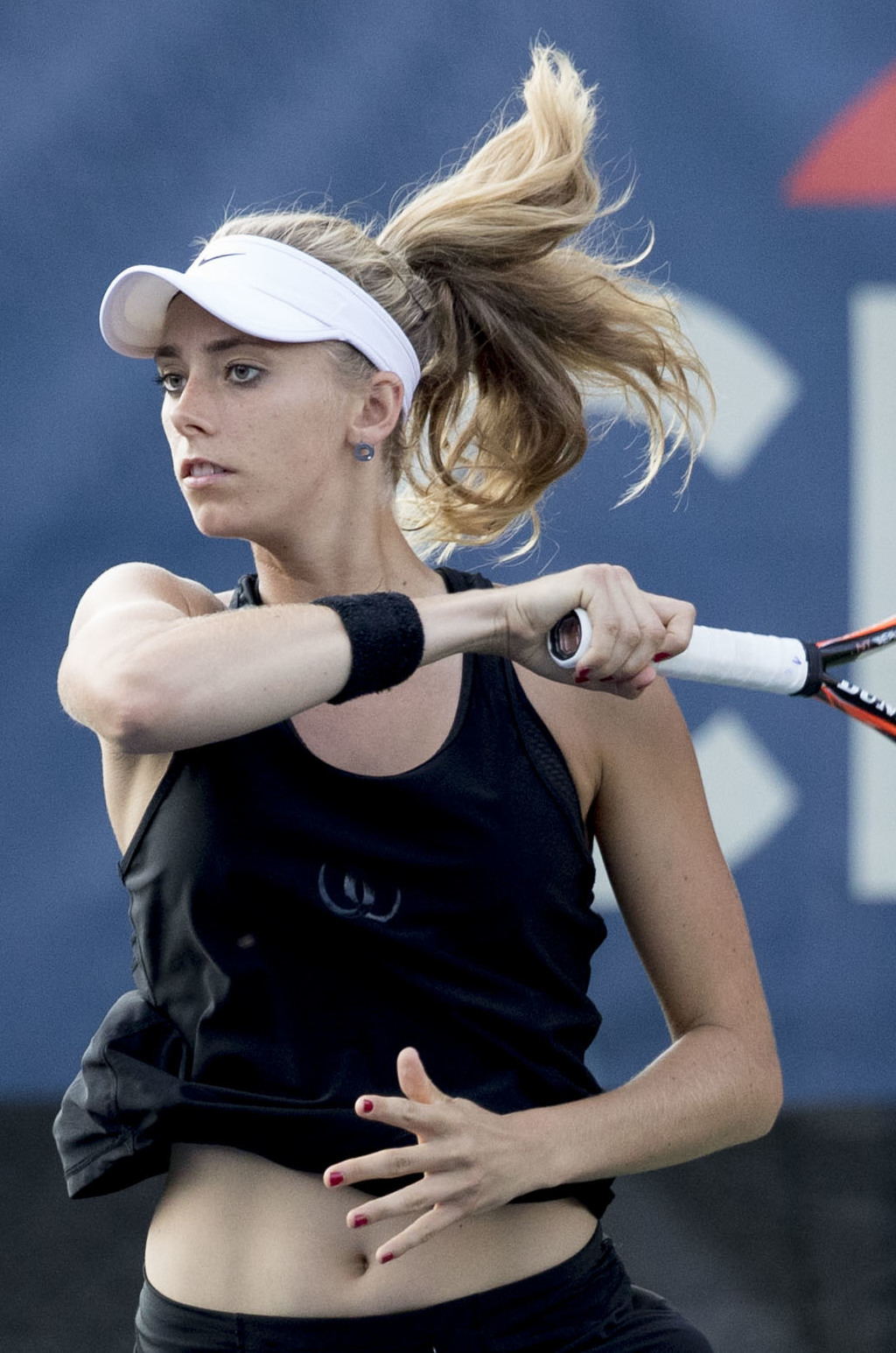
- Lister at the 2017 Citi Open
- Country (sports): Sweden
- Residence: Linköping, Sweden
- Born: 26 May 1994 (age 32) Oslo, Norway
- Height: 1.83 m (6 ft 0 in)
- Retired: 2022 (2021 last WTA match)
- Prize money: US$ 230,906

Singles
- Career record: 140–139
- Career titles: 1 ITF
- Highest ranking: No. 383 (7 May 2018)

Doubles
- Career record: 219–165
- Career titles: 1 WTA, 25 ITF
- Highest ranking: No. 72 (3 February 2020)

Grand Slam doubles results
- Australian Open: 1R (2020, 2021)
- French Open: 2R (2020)
- Wimbledon: 1R (2019, 2021)
- US Open: 1R (2019)

Team competitions
- Fed Cup: 8–8

Cornelia Lister (born 26 May 1994) is a Swedish padel player and a former tennis player. On 3 February 2020, she reached a career-high doubles ranking of world No. 72. On 7 May 2018, she peaked at No. 383 in the singles rankings.

Lister won one doubles title on the WTA Tour. She also won 26 doubles titles on the ITF Women's Circuit.

== Doubles performance timeline ==
Key
W	F	SF	QF	#R	RR	Q#	DNQ	A	NH

(W) winner; (F) finalist; (SF) semifinalist; (QF) quarterfinalist; (#R) rounds 4, 3, 2, 1; (RR) round-robin stage; (Q#) qualification round; (DNQ) did not qualify; (A) absent; (NH) not held; (SR) strike rate (events won / competed); (W–L) win–loss record.
To avoid confusion and double counting, these charts are updated at the conclusion of a tournament or when the player's participation has ended.

Tournament	2018	2019	2020	2021	SR	W–L	Win %
Grand Slam tournaments
Australian Open	A	A	1R	1R	0 / 2	0–2	0%
French Open	A	A	2R	1R	0 / 2	1–2	33%
Wimbledon	Q1	1R	NH	1R	0 / 2	0–2	0%
US Open	A	1R	A	A	0 / 1	0–1	0%
Win–loss	0–0	0–2	1–2	0–3	0 / 7	1–7	13%
WTA 1000
Dubai / Qatar Open	A	A	A	1R	0 / 1	0–1	0%

== WTA Tour finals ==
=== Doubles: 1 (title) ===
Legend Premier International (1–0)	Finals by surface Hard (0–0) Clay (1–0)

Result	Date	Tournament	Tier	Surface	Partner	Opponents	Score
Win	Jul 2019	Palermo Ladies Open, Italy	International	Clay	(Czech Republic) Renata Voráčová	(Georgia (country)) Ekaterine Gorgodze (Netherlands) Arantxa Rus	7–6^{(7–2)}, 6–2

== WTA 125 tournament finals ==
=== Doubles: 2 (2 runner-ups) ===
Result	W–L	Date	Tournament	Surface	Partner	Opponents	Score
Loss	0–1	Mar 2019	Abierto Zapopan, Mexico	Hard	(Czech Republic) Renata Voráčová	(United States) Maria Sanchez (Hungary) Fanny Stollár	5–7, 1–6
Loss	0–2	Jun 2019	Bol Open, Croatia	Hard	(Czech Republic) Renata Voráčová	(Switzerland) Timea Bacsinszky (Luxembourg) Mandy Minella	6–0, 6–7^{(3–7)}, [4–10]

== ITF finals ==
=== Singles: 4 (1 title, 3 runner-ups) ===
Legend $15,000 tournaments $10,000 tournaments	Finals by surface Hard (0–1) Clay (1–2)

Result	W–L	Date	Tournament	Tier	Surface	Opponent	Score
Loss	0–1	Nov 2014	ITF Oslo, Norway	10,000	Hard (i)	(Denmark) Karen Barbat	2–6, 2–6
Loss	0–2	May 2016	ITF Båstad, Sweden	10,000	Clay	(Denmark) Karen Barritza	4–6, 4–6
Win	1–2	Aug 2017	ITF Las Palmas, Spain	15,000	Clay	(Italy) Gaia Sanesi	6–4, 6–4
Loss	1–3	Mar 2018	ITF Antalya, Turkey	15,000	Clay	(Slovakia) Rebecca Šramková	1–6, 5–7

=== Doubles: 40 (25 titles, 15 runner-ups) ===
Legend $100,000 tournaments $75/80,000 tournaments $60,000 tournaments $25,000 tournaments $15,000 tournaments $10,000 tournaments	Finals by surface Hard (7–4) Clay (17–10) Carpet (1–1)

Result	W–L	Date	Tournament	Tier	Surface	Partner	Opponents	Score
Loss	0–1	Sep 2012	ITF Lleida, Spain	10,000	Clay	(Italy) Chiara Mendo	(Argentina) Tatiana Búa (Spain) Yvonne Cavallé Reimers	2–6, 3–6
Loss	0–2	Feb 2013	ITF Helsingborg, Sweden	10,000	Carpet (i)	(Netherlands) Lisanne van Riet	(Sweden) Ellen Allgurin (Latvia) Jeļena Ostapenko	2–6, 7–6, [7–10]
Loss	0–3	Apr 2013	ITF Les Franqueses del Vallès, Spain	10,000	Hard	(Italy) Sara Sussarello	(Netherlands) Dide Beijer (France) Estelle Cascino	4–6, 7–6, [6–10]
Win	1–3	Jul 2013	ITF Getxo, Spain	10,000	Clay	(Sweden) Jacqueline Cabaj Awad	(Australia) Ashley Keir (Ecuador) Charlotte Römer	6–2, 6–4
Win	2–3	Sep 2013	ITF Berlin, Germany	15,000	Clay	(Belgium) Ysaline Bonaventure	(Czech Republic) Lenka Kunčíková (Czech Republic) Karolína Stuchlá	6–4, 3–6, [10–5]
Win	3–3	Feb 2014	ITF Helsingborg, Sweden	10,000	Hard (i)	(Netherlands) Lisanne van Riet	(Ukraine) Olga Ianchuk (Bosnia and Herzegovina) Jasmina Tinjić	6–4, 6–3
Win	4–3	Jun 2014	ITF Kristinehamn, Sweden	25,000	Clay	(Ukraine) Kateryna Bondarenko	(Belgium) Ysaline Bonaventure (Poland) Sandra Zaniewska	w/o
Win	5–3	Jul 2014	ITF Tallinn, Estonia	10,000	Clay	(Russia) Alexandra Artamonova	(Estonia) Julia Skripnik (Estonia) Eva Paalma	6–3, 6–2
Win	6–3	Aug 2014	ITF Rotterdam, Netherlands	10,000	Clay	(Australia) Alison Bai	(France) Brandy Mina (Netherlands) Jainy Scheepens	7–5, 6–4
Loss	6–4	Feb 2015	ITF Sunderland, UK	10,000	Hard (i)	(Poland) Justyna Jegiołka	(United Kingdom) Jocelyn Rae (United Kingdom) Anna Smith	3–6, 1–6
Loss	6–5	Feb 2015	ITF Antalya, Turkey	10,000	Clay	(Ukraine) Alyona Sotnikova	(Georgia (country)) Ekaterine Gorgodze (Russia) Victoria Kan	1–6, 0–6
Win	7–5	Mar 2015	ITF Antalya, Turkey	10,000	Clay	(United Kingdom) Tara Moore	(Germany) Kim Grajdek (Australia) Alexandra Nancarrow	7–6^{(0)}, 7–5
Win	8–5	Mar 2015	ITF Antalya, Turkey	10,000	Clay	(Belarus) Sviatlana Pirazhenka	(Germany) Kim Grajdek (Slovakia) Lenka Juríková	7–6^{(6)}, 6–4
Win	9–5	May 2015	ITF Båstad, Sweden	10,000	Clay	(Colombia) Yuliana Lizarazo	(Germany) Carolin Daniels (Germany) Laura Schaeder	7–5, 5–7, [10–8]
Win	10–5	May 2015	ITF Båstad, Sweden	10,000	Clay	(Norway) Melanie Stokke	(United States) Veronica Corning (Sweden) Maja Örnberg	5–7, 6–3, [10–8]
Win	11–5	Jun 2015	ITF Ystad, Sweden	25,000	Clay	(Switzerland) Xenia Knoll	(Switzerland) Conny Perrin (South Africa) Chanel Simmonds	7–5, 7–6^{(5)}
Loss	11–6	Jun 2015	ITF Helsingborg, Sweden	25,000	Clay	(Georgia (country)) Ekaterine Gorgodze	(Turkey) Pemra Özgen (United States) Bernarda Pera	2–6, 0–6
Loss	11–7	Jul 2015	Sobota Open, Poland	75,000	Clay	(Latvia) Jeļena Ostapenko	(Netherlands) Kiki Bertens (Netherlands) Richèl Hogenkamp	6–7^{(2)}, 4–6
Win	12–7	Oct 2015	ITF Stockholm, Sweden	10,000	Hard (i)	(Sweden) Hilda Melander	(Russia) Ksenia Gaydarzhi (Sweden) Anette Munozova	6–4, 6–3
Win	13–7	May 2016	ITF Båstad, Sweden	10,000	Clay	(Denmark) Emilie Francati	(Norway) Astrid Brune Olsen (Norway) Malene Helgø	6–2, 6–2
Win	14–7	May 2016	ITF Båstad, Sweden	10,000	Clay	(Denmark) Emilie Francati	(Romania) Irina Bara (Norway) Melanie Stokke	6–2, 6–4
Win	15–7	Jun 2016	ITF Ystad, Sweden	25,000	Clay	(Serbia) Nina Stojanović	(Bulgaria) Dia Evtimova (Austria) Pia König	6–4, 6–2
Loss	15–8	Jul 2016	ITF Helsingborg, Sweden	25,000	Clay	(Russia) Anna Morgina	(China) Tian Ran (China) You Xiaodi	4–6, 3–6
Win	16–8	Aug 2016	ITF Plzeň, Czech Republic	25,000	Clay	(Poland) Katarzyna Kawa	(Bosnia and Herzegovina) Ema Burgić Bucko (Spain) Georgina García Pérez	6–1, 7–6^{(6)}
Loss	16–9	Sep 2016	Open de Biarritz, France	100,000	Clay	(Serbia) Nina Stojanović	(Russia) Irina Khromacheva (Ukraine) Maryna Zanevska	6–4, 5–7, [8–10]
Win	17–9	Oct 2016	ITF Équeurdreville, France	25,000	Hard (i)	(Russia) Polina Monova	(France) Amandine Hesse (Belgium) An-Sophie Mestach	7–5, 4–6, [10–6]
Win	18–9	Nov 2016	ITF Stockholm, Sweden	10,000	Hard (i)	(Ukraine) Anastasiya Shoshyna	(Sweden) Hilda Melander (Sweden) Paulina Milosavljevic	7–6^{(3)}, 6–2
Loss	18–10	Feb 2017	Open de Grenoble, France	25,000	Hard (i)	(Romania) Alexandra Cadanțu	(Belarus) Ilona Kremen (Czech Republic) Tereza Smitková	1–6, 5–7
Win	19–10	Feb 2017	AK Ladies Open, Germany	25,000	Carpet (i)	(Romania) Alexandra Cadanțu	(United Kingdom) Tara Moore (Switzerland) Conny Perrin	6–2, 3–6, [11–9]
Loss	19–11	May 2017	ITF Båstad, Sweden	25,000	Clay	(Belarus) Ilona Kremen	(Belgium) An-Sophie Mestach (Belgium) Kimberley Zimmermann	6–4, 2–6, [5–10]
Win	20–11	Aug 2017	ITF Braunschweig, Germany	25,000	Clay	(Spain) María Teresa Torró Flor	(Russia) Anastasiya Komardina (Latvia) Diāna Marcinkēviča	3–6, 7–6^{(5)}, [11–9]
Win	21–11	Sep 2017	ITF Clermont-Ferrand, France	25,000	Hard (i)	(Belarus) Vera Lapko	(United Kingdom) Sarah Beth Grey (United Kingdom) Olivia Nicholls	6–4, 6–3
Win	22–11	Mar 2018	ITF Antalya, Turkey	15,000	Clay	(Switzerland) Xenia Knoll	(Russia) Amina Anshba (Kyrgyzstan) Ksenia Palkina	6–0, 5–7, [10–8]
Loss	22–12	Apr 2018	Wiesbaden Open, Germany	25,000	Clay	(United States) Sabrina Santamaria	(Belgium) Hélène Scholsen (South Africa) Chanel Simmonds	3–6, 6–2, [8–10]
Win	23–12	Jul 2018	ITF Prague Open, Czech Republic	80,000	Clay	(Serbia) Nina Stojanović	(Netherlands) Bibiane Schoofs (Belgium) Kimberley Zimmermann	6–2, 2–6, [10–8]
Loss	23–13	Aug 2018	ITF Braunschweig, Germany	25,000	Clay	(Latvia) Diāna Marcinkeviča	(Belgium) Julia Wachaczyk (Czech Republic) Anastasia Zarycká	4–6, 6–3, [9–11]
Win	24–13	Oct 2018	ITF Oslo, Norway	25,000	Hard (i)	(United Kingdom) Harriet Dart	(Romania) Laura Ioana Paar (Belgium) Hélène Scholsen	7–6^{(3)}, 7–5
Loss	24–14	Dec 2018	Dubai Tennis Challenge, UAE	100,000+H	Hard	(Hungary) Réka Luca Jani	(Russia) Alena Fomina (Russia) Valentina Ivakhnenko	5–7, 2–6
Win	25–14	Jan 2019	Open Andrézieux-Bouthéon, France	60,000	Hard (i)	(Czech Republic) Renata Voráčová	(Romania) Andreea Mitu (Romania) Elena-Gabriela Ruse	6–1, 6–2
Loss	25–15	May 2019	Empire Slovak Open, Slovakia	100,000	Clay	(Czech Republic) Renata Voráčová	(Russia) Anna Blinkova (Switzerland) Xenia Knoll	5–7, 5–7
