= Al Habtoor Tennis Challenge =

- 2025 Al Habtoor Tennis Challenge

ITF Women's Tour
- Event name: Al Habtoor Tennis Challenge
- Location: Dubai, United Arab Emirates
- Venue: Al Habtoor Grand Resort, Autograph Collection
- Category: ITF Women's Circuit
- Surface: Hard
- Draw: 32S/32Q/16D
- Prize money: $100,000+H
- Website: Official website

The Al Habtoor Tennis Challenge is a tournament for professional female tennis players, played on outdoor hardcourts. The event is classified as an ITF Women's Circuit tournament and has been held annually in Dubai, United Arab Emirates since 1998.

== History ==
The tournament began in 1998 as an $25,000 event. From 1999 to 2015, it was classified as a $75,000 event, however the 2004 edition was cancelled. In 2016, it was upgraded to a $100,000+H event.

== Past finals ==
=== Singles ===
Year	Champion	Runner-up	Score
2025	(Croatia) Petra Marčinko	Vera Zvonareva	6–3, 6–3
2024	(United Kingdom) Jodie Burrage	Polina Kudermetova	6–3, 6–3
2023	Anastasia Tikhonova	(Netherlands) Arianne Hartono	6–1, 6–4
2022	(France) Elsa Jacquemot	(Poland) Magdalena Fręch	7–5, 6–2
2021	(Ukraine) Daria Snigur	(Slovakia) Kristína Kučová	6–3, 6–0
2020	(Romania) Sorana Cîrstea	(Czech Republic) Kateřina Siniaková	4–6, 6–3, 6–3
2019	(Romania) Ana Bogdan	(Ukraine) Daria Snigur	6–1, 6–2
2018	(China) Peng Shuai	(Slovakia) Viktória Kužmová	6–3, 6–0
2017	(Switzerland) Belinda Bencic	(Croatia) Ajla Tomljanović	6–4, 0–0 ret.
2016	(Chinese Taipei) Hsieh Su-wei	(Russia) Natalia Vikhlyantseva	6–2, 6–2
2015	(Turkey) Çağla Büyükakçay	(Czech Republic) Klára Koukalová	6–7^{(4–7)}, 6–4, 6–4
2014	(Romania) Alexandra Dulgheru	(Japan) Kimiko Date-Krumm	6–3, 6–4
2013	(Slovakia) Jana Čepelová	(Italy) Maria Elena Camerin	6–1, 6–2
2012	(Japan) Kimiko Date-Krumm	(Kazakhstan) Yulia Putintseva	6–1, 3–6, 6–4
2011	(Thailand) Noppawan Lertcheewakarn	(France) Kristina Mladenovic	7–5, 6–4
2010	(India) Sania Mirza	(Serbia) Bojana Jovanovski	4–6, 6–3, 6–0
2009	(Russia) Regina Kulikova	(Czech Republic) Sandra Záhlavová	7–6^{(8–6)}, 6–3
2008	(Russia) Vitalia Diatchenko	(Poland) Urszula Radwańska	7–5, 2–6, 7–5
2007	(Russia) Maria Kirilenko	(Russia) Evgeniya Rodina	7–5, 6–2
2006	(Ukraine) Kateryna Bondarenko	(Belarus) Ekaterina Dzehalevich	6–1, 6–3
2005	(France) Marion Bartoli	(Estonia) Kaia Kanepi	6–2, 6–0
2004	not held		
2003	(Serbia and Montenegro) Jelena Janković	(Slovakia) Henrieta Nagyová	6–2, 7–5
2002	(Indonesia) Angelique Widjaja	(Japan) Shinobu Asagoe	7–5, 6–2
2001	(Greece) Eleni Daniilidou	(Hungary) Anikó Kapros	6–4, 6–4
2000	(Czech Republic) Adriana Gerši	(Italy) Tathiana Garbin	6–4, 6–3
1999	(Slovenia) Katarina Srebotnik	(Luxembourg) Anne Kremer	6–1, 6–1
1998	(Hungary) Kira Nagy	(Kazakhstan) Irina Selyutina	6–4, 6–1

=== Doubles ===
Year	Champions	Runners-up	Score
2025	(China) Gao Xinyu (Thailand) Mananchaya Sawangkaew	Rada Zolotareva; Vera Zvonareva	4–6, 7–5, [10–7]
2024	(Czech Republic) Anastasia Dețiuc; Anastasia Tikhonova	(Netherlands) Isabelle Haverlag; Elena Pridankina	6–3, 6–7^{(7–9)}, [10–8]
2023	(Hungary) Tímea Babos'; Vera Zvonareva	(United Kingdom) Olivia Nicholls (United Kingdom) Heather Watson	6–1, 2–6, [10–7]
2022	(Hungary) Tímea Babos (France) Kristina Mladenovic	(Poland) Magdalena Fręch (Ukraine) Kateryna Volodko	6–1, 6–3
2021	(Kazakhstan) Anna Danilina (Slovakia) Viktória Kužmová	(Russia) Angelina Gabueva (Russia) Anastasia Zakharova	4–6, 6–3, [10–2]
2020	(Georgia (country)) Ekaterine Gorgodze (India) Ankita Raina	(Spain) Aliona Bolsova (Slovenia) Kaja Juvan	6–4, 3–6, [10–6]
2019	(Czech Republic) Lucie Hradecká (Slovenia) Andreja Klepač	(Spain) Georgina García Pérez (Spain) Sara Sorribes Tormo	7–5, 3–6, [10–8]
2018	(Russia) Alena Fomina (Russia) Valentina Ivakhnenko	(Hungary) Réka Luca Jani (Sweden) Cornelia Lister	7–5, 6–2
2017	(Romania) Mihaela Buzărnescu (Russia) Alena Fomina	(Netherlands) Lesley Kerkhove (Belarus) Lidziya Marozava	6–4, 6–3
2016	(Luxembourg) Mandy Minella (Serbia) Nina Stojanović	(Chinese Taipei) Hsieh Su-wei (Russia) Valeria Savinykh	6–3, 3–6, [10–4]
2015	(Turkey) Çağla Büyükakçay (Greece) Maria Sakkari	(Belgium) Elise Mertens (Turkey) İpek Soylu	7–6^{(8–6)}, 6–4
2014	(Russia) Vitalia Diatchenko (Russia) Alexandra Panova	(Ukraine) Lyudmyla Kichenok (Ukraine) Olga Savchuk	3–6, 6–2, [10–4]
2013	(Russia) Vitalia Diatchenko (Ukraine) Olga Savchuk	(Ukraine) Lyudmyla Kichenok (Ukraine) Nadiia Kichenok	7–5, 6–1
2012	(Italy) Maria Elena Camerin (Russia) Vera Dushevina	(Czech Republic) Eva Hrdinová (Czech Republic) Karolína Plíšková	7–5, 6–3
2011	(Russia) Nina Bratchikova (Croatia) Darija Jurak	(Uzbekistan) Akgul Amanmuradova (Romania) Alexandra Dulgheru	6–4, 3–6, [10–6]
2010	(Germany) Julia Görges (Croatia) Petra Martić	(India) Sania Mirza (Czech Republic) Vladimíra Uhlířová	6–4, 7–6^{(9–7)}
2009	(Germany) Julia Görges (Georgia (country)) Oksana Kalashnikova	(Czech Republic) Vladimíra Uhlířová (Czech Republic) Renata Voráčová	4–6, 6–2, [10–8]
2008	(France) Irena Pavlovic (Slovenia) Maša Zec Peškirič	(Russia) Elena Chalova (Russia) Valeria Savinykh	7–6^{(8–6)}, 3–6, [10–3]
2007	(New Zealand) Marina Erakovic (Romania) Monica Niculescu	(Ukraine) Yuliana Fedak (Russia) Anna Lapushchenkova	7–6^{(7–1)}, 6–4
2006	(Bosnia and Herzegovina) Mervana Jugić-Salkić (Croatia) Jelena Kostanić	(Ukraine) Kateryna Bondarenko (Ukraine) Valeria Bondarenko	6–3, 6–0
2005	(Czech Republic) Gabriela Navrátilová (Czech Republic) Hana Šromová	(Russia) Ekaterina Makarova (Russia) Olga Panova	7–5, 6–4
2004	not held		
2003	(Hungary) Zsófia Gubacsi (Hungary) Kira Nagy	(Italy) Flavia Pennetta (Italy) Adriana Serra Zanetti	2–6, 6–2, 6–2
2002	(Germany) Kirstin Freye (Netherlands) Seda Noorlander	(Morocco) Bahia Mouhtassine (Indonesia) Angelique Widjaja	6–2, 6–4
2001	(Belgium) Laurence Courtois (Netherlands) Seda Noorlander	(France) Caroline Dhenin (Hungary) Katalin Marosi-Aracama	6–3, 6–0
2000	(Italy) Tathiana Garbin (Hungary) Katalin Marosi-Aracama	(Germany) Angelika Bachmann (Slovenia) Tina Križan	7–6^{(7–5)}, 6–3
1999	(Sweden) Åsa Carlsson (Belgium) Laurence Courtois	(Italy) Laura Golarsa (Kazakhstan) Irina Selyutina	6–3, 6–7^{(5–7)}, 6–0
1998	(Indonesia) Wynne Prakusya (Thailand) Benjamas Sangaram	(Hungary) Petra Gáspár (Czech Republic) Ludmila Varmužová	7–6^{(7–1)}, 1–6, 6–3
