= Valentina Ivakhnenko =

Russian tennis player

Valentyna Ivakhnenko
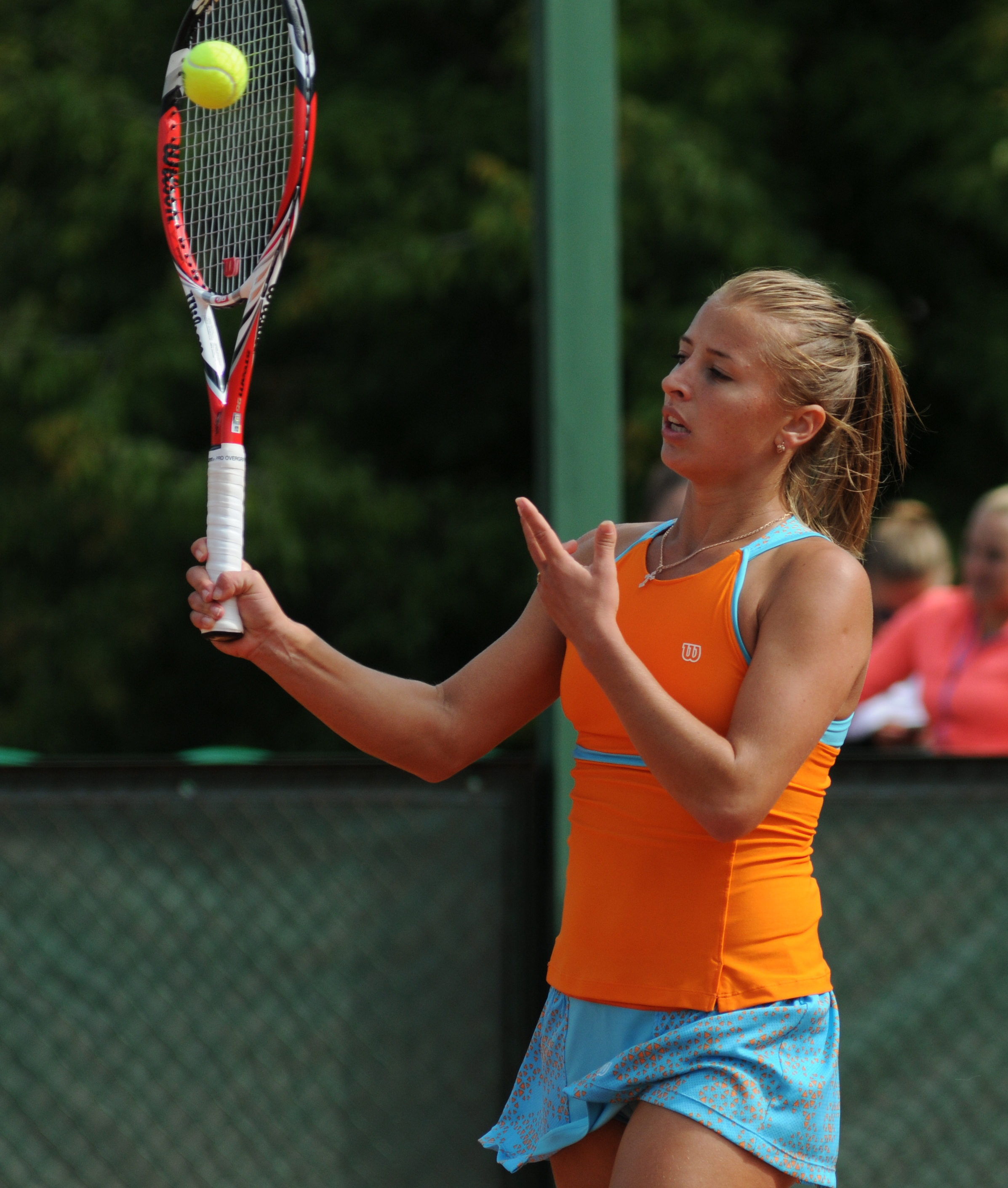
- Ivakhnenko 2014 in Moscow
- Country (sports): Ukraine (2007–2014); Russia (2014–2022)
- Residence: Donetsk, Ukraine
- Born: 27 June 1993 (age 33) Yalta, Ukraine
- Height: 1.63 m (5 ft 4 in)
- Retired: 2022
- Plays: Right (two-handed backhand)
- Prize money: US$ 351,985

Singles
- Career record: 322–229
- Career titles: 7 ITF
- Highest ranking: No. 167 (30 July 2018)

Grand Slam singles results
- Australian Open: Q1 (2018, 2019, 2021)
- French Open: Q1 (2018)
- Wimbledon: Q2 (2019)
- US Open: Q1 (2012, 2018)

Doubles
- Career record: 257–128
- Career titles: 35 ITF
- Highest ranking: No. 104 (28 November 2016)

Valentina Yuryevna Ivakhnenko (Russian: Валентина Юрьевна Ивахненко, Ukrainian: Валентина Юріївна Івахненко; born 27 June 1993) is a Russian former professional tennis player.

On 30 July 2018, she reached her highest singles ranking of world No. 167, whilst her best doubles ranking by the WTA was 104 on 28 November 2016.

In September 2014, six months after Crimea was occupied and subsequently annexed by the Russian Federation, Ukrainian-born Ivakhnenko became a naturalized citizen of Russia. She retired from ITF Circuit in 2022.

== WTA career finals ==
=== Doubles: 1 (runner-up) ===
Legend
Grand Slam tournaments
Premier M & Premier 5
Premier
International (0–1)

Result	Date	Tournament	Surface	Partner	Opponents	Score
Loss	Apr 2016	Katowice Open, Poland	Hard (i)	(Russia) Marina Melnikova	(Japan) Eri Hozumi (Japan) Miyu Kato	6–3, 5–7, [8–10]

== ITF Circuit finals ==
=== Singles: 14 (7 titles, 7 runner–ups) ===
Legend $50,000 tournaments $25,000 tournaments $15,000 tournaments $10,000 tournaments	Finals by surface Hard (0–1) Clay (7–6) Grass (0–0) Carpet (0–0)

Result	W–L	Date	Tournament	Tier	Surface	Opponent	Score
Win	1–0	Mar 2010	ITF Antalya, Turkey	10,000	Clay	(Romania) Mihaela Buzărnescu	6–3, 6–0
Win	2–0	Apr 2010	ITF Antalya, Turkey	10,000	Clay	(Netherlands) Daniëlle Harmsen	6–3, 7–6^{(5)}
Win	3–0	Oct 2010	ITF Bucha, Ukraine	25,000	Clay	(Ukraine) Oxana Lyubtsova	6–2, 2–0 ret.
Loss	3–1	Jul 2011	ITF Denain, France	25,000	Clay	(Brazil) Teliana Pereira	4–6, 3–6
Win	4–1	Aug 2011	ITF Moscow, Russia	25,000	Clay	(Russia) Valeria Solovyeva	6–1, 6–3
Loss	4–2	Aug 2013	Kazan Open, Russia	50,000	Hard	(Ukraine) Lyudmyla Kichenok	2–6, 6–2, 2–6
Loss	4–3	Dec 2015	ITF Cairo, Egypt	25,000	Clay	(Romania) Mihaela Buzărnescu	0–6, 3–6
Loss	4–4	Feb 2017	ITF Antalya, Turkey	15,000	Clay	(Bulgaria) Dia Evtimova	w/o
Win	5–4	Apr 2017	ITF Pula, Italy	25,000	Clay	(Spain) Georgina García Pérez	7–5, 6–3
Loss	5–5	Jul 2017	ITF Moscow, Russia	25,000	Clay	(Ukraine) Olga Ianchuk	6–4, 0–6, 6–7^{(5)}
Loss	5–6	Oct 2017	ITF Pula, Italy	25,000	Clay	(Slovenia) Polona Hercog	1–6, 0–6
Win	6–6	Apr 2018	Nana Trophy, Tunisia	25,000	Clay	(France) Chloé Paquet	6–2, 6–2
Win	7–6	Nov 2018	ITF Pula, Italy	25,000	Clay	(Slovenia) Pia Čuk	6–2, 6–1
Loss	7–7	Jul 2019	ITF The Hague, Netherlands	25,000	Clay	(Netherlands) Arantxa Rus	2–6, 2–6

=== Doubles: 50 (35 titles, 15 runner–ups) ===
Legend $100,000 tournaments $80,000 tournaments $50/$60,000 tournaments $25,000 tournaments $15,000 tournaments $10,000 tournaments	Finals by surface Hard (9–9) Clay (26–6) Grass (0–0) Carpet (0–0)

Result	W–L	Date	Tournament	Tier	Surface	Partnering	Opponents	Score
Win	1–0	May 2008	ITF Kharkiv, Ukraine	10,000	Clay	(Ukraine) Anastasiya Kyrylova	(Ukraine) Yuliya Lyndina (Ukraine) Oksana Pavlova	6–3, 6–2
Loss	1–1	Jul 2010	ITF Pozoblanco, Spain	50,000	Hard	(Ukraine) Kateryna Kozlova	(Japan) Akiko Yonemura (Japan) Tomoko Yonemura	4–6, 6–3, [4–10]
Loss	1–2	Jul 2010	ITF Kharkiv, Ukraine	25,000	Clay	(Ukraine) Alyona Sotnikova	(Ukraine) Kateryna Kozlova (Ukraine) Elina Svitolina	3–6, 5–7
Loss	1–3	Aug 2010	ITF St. Petersburg, Russia	10,000	Clay	(Ukraine) Mariya Malkhasyan	(Russia) Eugeniya Pashkova (Russia) Maria Zharkova	4–6, 7–5, [9–11]
Loss	1–4	Oct 2010	ITF Bucha, Ukraine	25,000	Clay	(Ukraine) Anastasiya Lytovchenko	(Russia) Yuliya Kalabina (Russia) Tatiana Kotelnikova	4–6, 5–7
Win	2–4	Jun 2011	ITF Kharkiv, Ukraine	25,000	Clay	(Ukraine) Kateryna Kozlova	(Austria) Melanie Klaffner (Lithuania) Lina Stančiūtė	6–4, 6–3
Win	3–4	Jul 2011	Open Contrexéville, France	50,000	Clay	(Ukraine) Kateryna Kozlova	(Japan) Erika Sema (Brazil) Roxane Vaisemberg	2–6, 7–5, [12–10]
Win	4–4	Aug 2011	ITF Moscow, Russia	25,000	Clay	(Ukraine) Kateryna Kozlova	(Hungary) Vaszilisza Bulgakova (Russia) Anna Rapoport	6–3, 6–0
Win	5–4	Sep 2011	Save Cup Mestre, Italy	50,000	Clay	(Russia) Marina Melnikova	(Hungary) Tímea Babos (Poland) Magda Linette	6–4, 7–5
Loss	5–5	Jan 2012	Open de l'Isère, France	25,000	Hard (i)	(Ukraine) Maryna Zanevska	(Czech Republic) Karolína Plíšková (Czech Republic) Kristýna Plíšková	1–6, 3–6
Loss	5–6	Mar 2012	ITF Moscow, Russia	25,000	Hard (i)	(Ukraine) Kateryna Kozlova	(Russia) Margarita Gasparyan (Russia) Anna Arina Marenko	6–3, 6–7^{(7)}, [6–10]
Win	6–6	May 2012	ITF Moscow, Russia	25,000	Clay	(Ukraine) Kateryna Kozlova	(Belarus) Darya Lebesheva (Russia) Julia Valetova	6–1, 6–3
Win	7–6	May 2012	ITF Astana, Kazakhstan	25,000	Hard (i)	(Ukraine) Kateryna Kozlova	(Russia) Diana Isaeva (Russia) Ksenia Kirillova	6–2, 6–0
Win	8–6	Jun 2012	ITF Qarshi, Uzbekistan	25,000	Hard	(Ukraine) Kateryna Kozlova	(Ukraine) Veronika Kapshay (Serbia) Teodora Mirčić	7–5, 6–3
Loss	8–7	Jun 2012	ITF Bukhara, Uzbekistan	25,000	Hard	(Ukraine) Kateryna Kozlova	(Ukraine) Lyudmyla Kichenok (Ukraine) Nadiia Kichenok	5–7, 5–7
Loss	8–8	Jun 2012	ITF Rome, Italy	25,000	Clay	(United States) Julia Cohen	(Canada) Marie-Ève Pelletier (France) Laura Thorpe	0–6, 6–3, [8–10]
Loss	8–9	Jul 2012	ITF Donetsk, Ukraine	50,000	Hard	(Ukraine) Kateryna Kozlova	(Ukraine) Lyudmyla Kichenok (Ukraine) Nadiia Kichenok	2–6, 5–7
Win	9–9	Aug 2012	Tatarstan Open, Russia	50,000	Clay	(Ukraine) Kateryna Kozlova	(Ukraine) Lyudmyla Kichenok (Ukraine) Nadiia Kichenok	6–4, 6–7^{(6)}, [10–4]
Win	10–9	Sep 2012	ITF Shymkent, Kazakhstan	25,000	Hard	(Ukraine) Kateryna Kozlova	(Uzbekistan) Nigina Abduraimova (Kyrgyzstan) Ksenia Palkina	6–2, 6–4
Loss	10–10	Apr 2013	ITF Namangan, Uzbekistan	25,000	Hard	(Kyrgyzstan) Ksenia Palkina	(Uzbekistan) Albina Khabibulina (Ukraine) Anastasiya Vasylyeva	3–6, 3–6
Win	11–10	Aug 2013	Tatarstan Open, Russia (2)	50,000	Clay	(Ukraine) Kateryna Kozlova	(Turkey) Başak Eraydın (Ukraine) Veronika Kapshay	6–4, 6–1
Win	12–10	Sep 2013	Batumi Ladies Open, Georgia	25,000	Clay	(Ukraine) Kateryna Kozlova	(Germany) Christina Shakovets (Ukraine) Alena Fomina	6–0, 6–4
Win	13–10	Jan 2014	ITF Sharm El Sheikh, Egypt	10,000	Hard	(Ukraine) Veronika Kapshay	(Turkey) Melis Sezer (Turkey) İpek Soylu	3–6, 6–4, [10–5]
Win	14–10	Feb 2014	ITF Sharm El Sheikh, Egypt	10,000	Hard	(Ukraine) Veronika Kapshay	(Russia) Polina Leykina (Greece) Despina Papamichail	7–6^{(5)}, 6–2
Win	15–10	Feb 2014	ITF Moscow, Russia	25,000	Hard (i)	(Ukraine) Kateryna Kozlova	(Russia) Veronika Kudermetova (Belarus) Sviatlana Pirazhenka	7–6^{(6)}, 6–4
Loss	15–11	Sep 2014	ITF Moscow, Russia	25,000	Clay	(Russia) Yuliya Kalabina	(Kazakhstan) Anna Danilina (Switzerland) Xenia Knoll	1–6, 6–4, [6–10]
Loss	15–12	Nov 2014	ITF Sharm El Sheikh, Egypt	25,000	Hard	(Russia) Polina Monova	(Belgium) Marie Benoît (Netherlands) Demi Schuurs	4–6, 5–7
Win	16–12	Apr 2015	ITF Qarshi, Uzbekistan	25,000	Hard	(Russia) Polina Monova	(Kazakhstan) Kamila Kerimbayeva (Russia) Ksenia Lykina	6–1, 6–3
Loss	16–13	Apr 2015	ITF İstanbul, Turkey	50,000	Hard	(Russia) Polina Monova	(Ukraine) Lyudmyla Kichenok (Ukraine) Nadiia Kichenok	4–6, 3–6
Win	17–13	Jun 2015	ITF Minsk, Belarus	25,000	Clay	(Russia) Polina Monova	(Ukraine) Olga Ianchuk (Russia) Darya Kasatkina	4–6, 6–0, [12–10]
Win	18–13	Jun 2015	ITF Minsk, Belarus	25,000	Clay	(Russia) Irina Khromacheva	(Turkey) Pemra Özgen (Ukraine) Anastasiya Vasylyeva	6–3, 6–0
Win	19–13	Dec 2015	ITF Cairo, Egypt	25,000	Clay	(Slovenia) Dalila Jakupović	(Italy) Martina Caregaro (Hungary) Réka Luca Jani	w/o
Win	20–13	Dec 2015	Pune Championships, India	25,000	Hard	(Ukraine) Anastasiya Vasylyeva	(Chinese Taipei) Hsu Chieh-yu (India) Prarthana Thombare	4–6, 6–2, [12–10]
Loss	20–14	Apr 2016	ITF İstanbul, Turkey	50,000	Hard	(Belarus) Lidziya Marozava	(Uzbekistan) Nigina Abduraimova (Czech Republic) Barbora Štefková	4–6, 6–1, [6–10]
Win	21–14	Aug 2016	ITF Kharkiv, Ukraine	25,000	Clay	(Russia) Anastasiya Komardina	(Turkey) Başak Eraydın (Belarus) Ilona Kremen	6–1, 6–3
Win	22–14	Sep 2016	ITF Almaty, Kazakhstan	25,000	Clay	(Russia) Anastasiya Komardina	(Russia) Polina Monova (Russia) Valeria Savinykh	7–5, 6–4
Win	23–14	Sep 2016	ITF Bucha, Ukraine	25,000	Clay	(Russia) Anastasiya Komardina	(Romania) Mihaela Buzărnescu (Moldova) Alexandra Perper	6–3, 6–1
Win	24–14	Feb 2017	ITF Antalya, Turkey	15,000	Clay	(Turkey) Başak Eraydın	(Switzerland) Karin Kennel (Slovenia) Nastja Kolar	7–6^{(6)}, 6–2
Win	25–14	Jun 2017	ITF Ystad, Sweden	25,000	Clay	(Mexico) Renata Zarazúa	(Netherlands) Quirine Lemoine (Netherlands) Eva Wacanno	6–3, 3–6, [10–5]
Win	26–14	Jul 2017	ITF Moscow, Russia	25,000	Clay	(Uzbekistan) Akgul Amanmuradova	(Belarus) Ilona Kremen (Belarus) Irina Shymanovich	6–4, 6–2
Win	27–14	July 2017	Bursa Cup, Turkey	60,000	Clay	(Ukraine) Anastasiya Vasylyeva	(Bosnia and Herzegovina) Dea Herdželaš (Russia) Aleksandra Pospelova	6–3, 5–7, [10–1]
Win	28–14	Aug 2017	ITF Leipzig, Germany	25,000	Clay	(Belarus) Lidziya Marozava	(Croatia) Tereza Mrdeža (India) Ankita Raina	6–2, 6–1
Win	29–14	Mar 2018	ITF Pula, Italy	25,000	Clay	(Russia) Valeriya Solovyeva	(Italy) Anastasia Grymalska (Czech Republic) Anastasia Zarycká	6–3, 3–6, [10–5]
Win	30–14	Sep 2018	Open de Biarritz, France	80,000	Clay	(Romania) Irina Bara	(Belgium) Ysaline Bonaventure (Belgium) Hélène Scholsen	6–4, 6–1
Win	31–14	Oct 2018	ITF Pula, Italy	25,000	Clay	(Czech Republic) Anastasia Zarycká	(Romania) Cristina Dinu (Italy) Camilla Rosatello	6–2, 6–4
Win	32–14	Dec 2018	Dubai Challenge, UAE	100,000	Hard	(Russia) Alena Fomina	(Hungary) Réka Luca Jani (Sweden) Cornelia Lister	7–5, 6–2
Win	33–14	Mar 2019	ITF Pula, Italy	25,000	Clay	(Russia) Alena Fomina	(Romania) Cristina Dinu (Hungary) Réka Luca Jani	6–3, 3–6, [10–8]
Win	34–14	May 2021	ITF La Bisbal d'Empordà, Spain	60,000	Clay	(Romania) Andreea Prisăcariu	(Germany) Mona Barthel (Luxembourg) Mandy Minella	6–3, 6–1
Win	35–14	May 2021	Liepāja Open, Latvia	25,000	Clay	(Uzbekistan) Akgul Amanmuradova	(Greece) Valentini Grammatikopoulou (Belarus) Shalimar Talbi	6–3, 3–6, [13–11]
Loss	35–15	Aug 2021	ITF Koksijde, Belgium	25,000	Clay	(Greece) Valentini Grammatikopoulou	(North Macedonia) Lina Gjorcheska (Ukraine) Valeriya Strakhova	4–6, 4–6
