= 2026 Oeiras CETO Open =

- Date: 20–26 April
- Edition: 11th
- Category: WTA 125
- Prize money: €100,000
- Surface: Clay / Outdoor
- Location: Oeiras, Portugal

Champions

Singles
- (France) Fiona Ferro

Doubles
- (Belgium) Sofia Costoulas / (Portugal) Matilde Jorge
- Oeiras CETO Open

The 2026 Oeiras CETO Open was a professional women's tennis tournament played on outdoor clay courts. It was the eleventh edition of the tournament and first as a WTA 125 tournament, which was part of the 2026 season. It took place at the Clube Escola de Ténis de Oeiras in Oeiras, Portugal between 20 and 26 April 2026.

== Singles main draw entrants ==
=== Seeds ===
Country	Player	Rank^{1}	Seed
GBR	Francesca Jones	103	1
CHN	Yuan Yue	114	2
LAT	Darja Semeņistaja	116	3
CAN	Bianca Andreescu	128	4
~~POL~~	~~Maja Chwalińska~~	~~129~~	~~5~~
BEL	Sofia Costoulas	134	6
ESP	Andrea Lázaro García	147	7
USA	Varvara Lepchenko	149	8

- ^{1} Rankings as of 13 April 2026.

=== Other entrants ===
The following players received a wildcard into the singles main draw:

- (Portugal) Milana Ivantsiv
- (Portugal) Matilde Jorge
- Miroslava Medvedeva
- (Portugal) Angelina Voloshchuk

The following player received entry using a protected ranking:

- (France) Fiona Ferro

The following players received entry from the qualifying draw:

- (Malta) Francesca Curmi
- (Czech Republic) Lucie Havlíčková
- (Uzbekistan) Polina Kudermetova
- Alisa Oktiabreva

The following player received entry as a lucky loser:

- (United States) Ayana Akli

=== Withdrawals ===
Before the tournament

- (Poland) Maja Chwalińska → replaced by (United States) Ayana Akli
- (Chinese Taipei) Joanna Garland → replaced by (Australia) Storm Hunter
- (Portugal) Francisca Jorge → replaced by (Switzerland) Céline Naef
- (France) Tiantsoa Rakotomanga Rajaonah → replaced by (Germany) Anna-Lena Friedsam

During the tournament

- (France) Carole Monnet (left leg injury)

=== Retirements ===
- (United Kingdom) Francesca Jones (right forearm injury)
- (Belgium) Greet Minnen (left wrist injury)

== Doubles entrants ==
=== Seeds ===
Country	Player	Country	Player	Rank^{1}	Seed
	Elena Pridankina	CHN	Tang Qianhui	152	1
ARG	Nicole Fossa Huergo	GEO	Ekaterine Gorgodze	188	2
GBR	Madeleine Brooks	USA	Ivana Corley	213	3
TPE	Cho I-hsuan	TPE	Cho Yi-tsen	216	4

- Rankings as of 13 April 2026.

=== Other entrants ===
The following pair received a wildcard into the doubles main draw:

- (Portugal) Milana Ivantsiv / Miroslava Medvedeva

== Champions ==
=== Singles ===
- (France) Fiona Ferro def. (Uzbekistan) Polina Kudermetova 6–3, 0–6, 6–1

=== Doubles ===
- (Belgium) Sofia Costoulas / (Portugal) Matilde Jorge def. (Belgium) Magali Kempen / (Belgium) Lara Salden 6–4, 6–2
