= 2024 Al Habtoor Tennis Challenge =

Tennis tournament

- Date: 2–8 December 2024
- Edition: 27th
- Category: ITF Women's World Tennis Tour
- Prize money: $100,000
- Surface: Hard
- Location: Dubai, United Arab Emirates
- Venue: Al Habtoor Grand Resort, Autograph Collection

Champions

Singles
- (United Kingdom) Jodie Burrage

Doubles
- (Czech Republic) Anastasia Dețiuc / Anastasia Tikhonova
← 2023 ·	Al Habtoor Tennis Challenge	· 2025 →

The 2024 Al Habtoor Tennis Challenge is a professional tennis tournament played on outdoor hard courts. It is the twenty-seventh edition of the tournament which is part of the 2024 ITF Women's World Tennis Tour. It took place in Dubai, United Arab Emirates between 2 and 8 December 2024.

== Champions ==
=== Singles ===
- (United Kingdom) Jodie Burrage def. Polina Kudermetova 6–3, 6–3

=== Doubles ===
- (Czech Republic) Anastasia Dețiuc / Anastasia Tikhonova def. (Netherlands) Isabelle Haverlag / Elena Pridankina 6–3, 6–7^{(7–9)}, [10–8]

== Singles main draw entrants ==
=== Seeds ===
Country	Player	Rank^{1}	Seed
	Polina Kudermetova	116	1
AUS	Arina Rodionova	135	2
NED	Arianne Hartono	147	3
PHI	Alexandra Eala	158	4
	Elena Pridankina	179	5
	Anastasia Tikhonova	197	6
	Aliona Falei	201	7
TUR	Berfu Cengiz	212	8

- ^{1} Rankings are as of 25 November 2024.

=== Other entrants ===
The following players received wildcards into the singles main draw:

- (India) Shrivalli Bhamidipaty
- (United Kingdom) Jodie Burrage
- ~~(Croatia) Petra Marčinko~~

The following players received entry from the qualifying draw:

- (United Kingdom) Freya Christie
- (Belgium) Sofia Costoulas
- Evialina Laskevich
- (Slovakia) Viktória Morvayová
- (Germany) Caroline Werner
- (Croatia) Tara Würth
- (Japan) Mei Yamaguchi
- Rada Zolotareva

The following players received entry as a lucky loser:

- (France) Amandine Hesse
- Ekaterina Yashina
