= Kudermetov =

Kudermetov (Russian: Кудерметов) is a Tatar masculine surname, its feminine counterpart is Kudermetova. The surname may refer to the following notable people:

- Eduard Kudermetov (born 1972), Russian ice hockey forward
- Polina Kudermetova (born 2003), Russian tennis player, daughter of Eduard
- Veronika Kudermetova (born 1997), Russian tennis player, daughter of Eduard
