= 2023 Oeiras CETO Open =

Tennis tournament

- Date: 24–30 April 2023
- Edition: 8th
- Category: ITF Women's World Tennis Tour
- Prize money: $60,000
- Surface: Clay / Outdoor
- Location: Oeiras, Portugal

Champions

Singles
- (Uzbekistan) Nigina Abduraimova

Doubles
- (Mexico) Fernanda Contreras / (Brazil) Ingrid Gamarra Martins
- Oeiras CETO Open

The 2023 Oeiras CETO Open was a professional tennis tournament played on outdoor clay courts. It was the eighth edition of the tournament, which was part of the 2023 ITF Women's World Tennis Tour. It took place in Oeiras, Portugal, between 24 and 30 April 2023.

== Champions ==
=== Singles ===
- (Uzbekistan) Nigina Abduraimova def. (Portugal) Francisca Jorge, 1–6, 6–4, 6–3

=== Doubles ===
- (Mexico) Fernanda Contreras / (Brazil) Ingrid Gamarra Martins def. (Czech Republic) Jesika Malečková / (Czech Republic) Renata Voráčová, 6–3, 6–2

== Singles main draw entrants ==
=== Seeds ===
Country	Player	Rank	Seed
AUS	Olivia Gadecki	150	1
AUT	Sinja Kraus	153	2
FRA	Elsa Jacquemot	167	3
BEL	Greet Minnen	170	4
UZB	Nigina Abduraimova	184	5
MEX	Fernanda Contreras	191	6
BEL	Magali Kempen	194	7
GER	Mona Barthel	201	8

- Rankings are as of 17 April 2023.

=== Other entrants ===
The following players received wildcards into the singles main draw:

- (Brazil) Ingrid Gamarra Martins
- (Portugal) Sara Lança
- (Portugal) Inês Murta
- (Portugal) Angelina Voloshchuk

The following player received entry into the singles main draw using a protected ranking:

- (France) Amandine Hesse

The following players received entry from the qualifying draw:

- (Spain) Lucía Cortez Llorca
- (Norway) Ulrikke Eikeri
- (Romania) Oana Gavrilă
- (Japan) Eri Hozumi
- (Czech Republic) Jesika Malečková
- (Hungary) Adrienn Nagy
- (Germany) Chantal Sauvant
- (Germany) Joëlle Steur

The following players received entry as lucky losers:

- (France) Yasmine Mansouri
- Ekaterina Yashina
