= 2026 Oeiras CETO Open – Doubles =

Doubles
- 2026 Oeiras CETO Open

Final
- Champions: (Belgium) Sofia Costoulas (Portugal) Matilde Jorge
- Runners-up: (Belgium) Magali Kempen (Belgium) Lara Salden
- Score: 6–4, 6–2

Events
Singles	Doubles
- Oeiras CETO Open

Francisca and Matilde Jorge were the reigning champions, but Francisca did not participate this year.

Matilde partnered Sofia Costoulas and won the title, defeating Magali Kempen and Lara Salden 6–4, 6–2 in the final.

== Seeds ==
1. Elena Pridankina / (China) Tang Qianhui (quarterfinals)
2. (Argentina) Nicole Fossa Huergo / (Georgia (country)) Ekaterine Gorgodze (first round)
3. (United Kingdom) Madeleine Brooks / (United States) Ivana Corley (first round)
4. (Chinese Taipei) Cho I-hsuan / Cho Yi-tsen (quarterfinals)

== Draw ==
Key

- Q = Qualifier
- WC = Wild card
- LL = Lucky loser
- Alt = Alternate
- ITF = ITF entry
- PR = Protected ranking
- SR = Special ranking
- SE = Special exempt
- JE = Junior exempt
- JR = Junior Accelerator Programme entrant
- CO = College Accelerator Programme entrant
- NG = Next Gen Accelerator Program entrant
- w/o = Walkover
- r = Retired
- d = Defaulted

=== Draw ===
First round
1	E Pridankina (China) Q Tang	6	6
(Czech Republic) L Havlíčková (Switzerland) C Naef	4	1
(Czech Republic) M Bayerlová (United States) V Lepchenko	4	4
(Belgium) M Kempen (Belgium) L Salden	6	6
3	(United Kingdom) M Brooks (United States) I Corley	6	3	[8]
(United States) A Akli (Portugal) A Voloshchuk	4	6	[10]
(Brazil) I Martins; E Ovcharenko	0	6^{8}
(Romania) I Bara (France) C Monnet	6	7^{10}
(United Kingdom) A Barnett (China) S Feng	4	4
(Switzerland) N Karamoko (Latvia) D Semeņistaja	6	6
(India) R Bhosale (India) A Raina	4	3
4	(Chinese Taipei) I-h Cho (Chinese Taipei) Y-t Cho	6	6
(Uzbekistan) P Kudermetova (United States) W Osuigwe	6	6
WC	(Portugal) M Ivantsiv; M Medvedeva	0	4
(Belgium) S Costoulas (Portugal) M Jorge	6	6
2	(Argentina) N Fossa Huergo (Georgia (country)) E Gorgodze	1	4

Quarterfinals
1	E Pridankina (China) Q Tang	6^{1}	1
(Belgium) M Kempen (Belgium) L Salden	7^{7}	6
(United States) A Akli (Portugal) A Voloshchuk	3	6	[10]
(Romania) I Bara (France) C Monnet	6	4	[8]
(Switzerland) N Karamoko (Latvia) D Semeņistaja	6	6
4	(Chinese Taipei) I-h Cho (Chinese Taipei) Y-t Cho	4	2
(Uzbekistan) P Kudermetova (United States) W Osuigwe	6^{6}	6	[8]
(Belgium) S Costoulas (Portugal) M Jorge	7^{8}	2	[10]

Semifinals
(Belgium) M Kempen (Belgium) L Salden	6^{5}	6	[10]
(United States) A Akli (Portugal) A Voloshchuk	7^{7}	1	[3]
(Switzerland) N Karamoko (Latvia) D Semeņistaja	5	1
(Belgium) S Costoulas (Portugal) M Jorge	7	6

Final
(Belgium) M Kempen (Belgium) L Salden	4	2
(Belgium) S Costoulas (Portugal) M Jorge	6	6
