= ITF Women's Oeiras =

ITF Women's Oeiras may refer to:

- Oeiras CETO Open (2016–2024)
- Oeiras Ladies Open (2021–2023)
