= 2022 Al Habtoor Tennis Challenge – Singles =

Singles
- 2022 Al Habtoor Tennis Challenge

Final
- Champion: (France) Elsa Jacquemot
- Runner-up: (Poland) Magdalena Fręch
- Score: 7–5, 6–2

Events
Singles	Doubles
← 2021 ·	Al Habtoor Tennis Challenge	· 2023 →

Daria Snigur was the defending champion, but lost in the first round to Rebecca Šramková.

Elsa Jacquemot won the title, defeating Magdalena Fręch in the final, 7–5, 6–2.

== Seeds ==
1. Diana Shnaider (quarterfinals)
2. (France) Kristina Mladenovic (quarterfinals)
3. (Poland) Magdalena Fręch (final)
4. (Ukraine) Daria Snigur (first round)
5. (Slovakia) Viktória Kužmová (semifinals, withdrew)
6. (Uzbekistan) Nigina Abduraimova (first round)
7. Anastasia Zakharova (quarterfinals)
8. (Austria) Sinja Kraus (first round)

== Draw ==
=== Key ===
- Q = Qualifier
- WC = Wild card
- LL = Lucky loser
- Alt = Alternate
- SE = Special exempt
- PR = Protected ranking
- ITF = ITF entry
- JE = Junior exempt
- w/o = Walkover
- r = Retired
- d = Defaulted
- SR = Special ranking

=== Finals ===
Semifinals
(France) Carole Monnet	5	1^{r}
(France) Elsa Jacquemot	7	4
3	(Poland) Magdalena Fręch	w/o
5	(Slovakia) Viktória Kužmová

Final
(France) Elsa Jacquemot	7	6
(Poland) Magdalena Fręch	5	2

=== Top half ===
First round
1	D Shnaider	6	6
(Hungary) N Szabanin	3	2
WC	(Hungary) T Babos	3	6	6
(Slovenia) D Jakupović	6	4	1
(Croatia) T Lukas	6	1	3
(Croatia) J Fett	4	6	6
(France) C Monnet	6	6
8	(Austria) S Kraus	1	2
4	(Ukraine) D Snigur	4	3
WC	(Slovakia) R Šramková	6	6
WC	(Israel) L Glushko	6	6
WC	(Egypt) S Samir	4	3
(France) E Jacquemot	6	6
E Reyngold	3	1
Q	M Timofeeva	6	6
6	(Uzbekistan) N Abduraimova	1	1

Second round
1	D Shnaider	6	5	6
WC	(Hungary) T Babos	1	7	4
(Croatia) J Fett	5	3
(France) C Monnet	7	6
WC	(Slovakia) R Šramková	7^{7}	6
WC	(Israel) L Glushko	6^{4}	3
(France) E Jacquemot	6	6
Q	M Timofeeva	1	4

Quarterfinals
1	D Shnaider	6	4	5
(France) C Monnet	2	6	7
WC	(Slovakia) R Šramková	1	4
(France) E Jacquemot	6	6

Semifinals
(France) C Monnet	5	1^{r}
(France) E Jacquemot	7	4

=== Bottom half ===
First round
7	A Zakharova	6	6
PR	(Austria) B Haas	4	1
Q	A Zolotareva	6	6
Q	E Yashina	0	1
Q	(Finland) A Kulikova	6	7
Q	(China) X You	3	5
PR	(Netherlands) B Schoofs	2	4
3	(Poland) M Fręch	6	6
5	(Slovakia) V Kužmová	6	7
Q	(Ukraine) K Volodko	1	5
(Cyprus) R Șerban	3	7^{7}	0
(United States) S Chang	6	6^{5}	6
Q	(Thailand) P Plipuech	2	6	6
(India) K Thandi	6	2	2
Q	(Romania) C Dinu	6^{4}	2
2	(France) K Mladenovic	7^{7}	6

Second round
7	A Zakharova	6	6
Q	A Zolotareva	0	1
Q	(Finland) A Kulikova	2	3
3	(Poland) M Fręch	6	6
5	(Slovakia) V Kužmová	6	6
(United States) S Chang	4	2
Q	(Thailand) P Plipuech	4	4
2	(France) K Mladenovic	6	6

Quarterfinals
7	A Zakharova	4	1
3	(Poland) M Fręch	6	6
5	(Slovakia) V Kužmová	6	6
2	(France) K Mladenovic	2	3

Semifinals
3	(Poland) M Fręch	w/o
5	(Slovakia) V Kužmová
