= 2024 Al Habtoor Tennis Challenge – Doubles =

Doubles
- 2024 Al Habtoor Tennis Challenge

Final
- Champions: (Czech Republic) Anastasia Dețiuc; Anastasia Tikhonova
- Runners-up: (Netherlands) Isabelle Haverlag; Elena Pridankina
- Score: 6–3, 6–7^{(7–9)}, [10–8]

Events
Singles	Doubles
← 2023 ·	Al Habtoor Tennis Challenge	· 2025 →

Anastasia Dețiuc and Anastasia Tikhonova won the title, defeating Isabelle Haverlag and Elena Pridankina in the final, 6–3, 6–7^{(7–9)}, [10–8].

Tímea Babos and Vera Zvonareva were the defending champions, but chose not to participate.

== Seeds ==
1. (Czech Republic) Anastasia Dețiuc / Anastasia Tikhonova (champions)
2. (Netherlands) Isabelle Haverlag / Elena Pridankina (final)
3. (Netherlands) Arianne Hartono / (India) Prarthana Thombare (first round)
4. (Bosnia and Herzegovina) Anita Wagner / Ekaterina Yashina (first round)

== Draw ==
=== Key ===
- Q = Qualifier
- WC = Wild card
- LL = Lucky loser
- Alt = Alternate
- ITF = ITF entry
- PR = Protected ranking
- SR = Special ranking
- SE = Special exempt
- JE = Junior exempt
- JR = Junior Accelerator Programme entrant
- CO = College Accelerator Programme entrant
- NG = Next Gen Accelerator Program entrant
- w/o = Walkover
- r = Retired
- d = Defaulted

=== Draw ===
First round
1	(Czech Republic) A Dețiuc; A Tikhonova	7	6
(Slovenia) D Jakupović; P Kudermetova	5	3
A Charaeva; E Reyngold	6	6
(Belgium) S Costoulas (India) S Yamalapalli	4	3
4	(Bosnia and Herzegovina) A Wagner; E Yashina	0	3
T Prozorova (Croatia) T Würth	6	6
WC	(India) S Bhamidipaty; E Laskevich	2	5
WC	A Zolotareva; R Zolotareva	6	7
(United Kingdom) J Burrage (United Kingdom) F Christie	6	6
(Romania) I Amariei (Romania) B Szabó	0	3
(Kazakhstan) Z Kulambayeva (India) A Raina	6	5	[10]
3	(Netherlands) A Hartono (India) P Thombare	3	7	[7]
(Philippines) A Eala (Greece) V Grammatikopoulou	6	6
WC	D Kudashova; E Shalimova	2	4
(France) A Hesse (Slovenia) N Radišić	1	6	[4]
2	(Netherlands) I Haverlag; E Pridankina	6	4	[10]

Quarterfinals
1	(Czech Republic) A Dețiuc; A Tikhonova	w/o
A Charaeva; E Reyngold
T Prozorova (Croatia) T Würth	w/o
WC	A Zolotareva; R Zolotareva
(United Kingdom) J Burrage (United Kingdom) F Christie	6	6^{2}	[10]
(Kazakhstan) Z Kulambayeva (India) A Raina	4	7^{7}	[6]
(Philippines) A Eala (Greece) V Grammatikopoulou	7	4	[3]
2	(Netherlands) I Haverlag; E Pridankina	5	6	[10]

Semifinals
1	(Czech Republic) A Dețiuc; A Tikhonova	6	6
T Prozorova (Croatia) T Würth	4	4
(United Kingdom) J Burrage (United Kingdom) F Christie	6	3	[7]
2	(Netherlands) I Haverlag; E Pridankina	2	6	[10]

Final
1	(Czech Republic) A Dețiuc; A Tikhonova	6	6^{7}	[10]
2	(Netherlands) I Haverlag; E Pridankina	3	7^{9}	[8]
