= 2024 Oeiras CETO Open =

Tennis tournament

- Date: 22–28 April 2024
- Edition: 9th
- Category: ITF Women's World Tennis Tour
- Prize money: $100,000
- Surface: Clay / Outdoor
- Location: Oeiras, Portugal

Champions

Singles
- (Croatia) Jana Fett

Doubles
- (Portugal) Francisca Jorge / (Portugal) Matilde Jorge
- Oeiras CETO Open

The 2024 Oeiras Ladies Open was a professional tennis tournament played on outdoor clay courts. It was the ninth edition of the tournament, which was part of the 2024 ITF Women's World Tennis Tour. It took place in Oeiras, Portugal, between 22 and 28 April 2024.

== Champions ==
=== Singles ===
- (Croatia) Jana Fett def. (Hungary) Panna Udvardy, 6–0, 6–2

=== Doubles ===
- (Portugal) Francisca Jorge / (Portugal) Matilde Jorge def. Yana Sizikova / (Chinese Taipei) Wu Fang-hsien, 6–2, 6–0

== Singles main draw entrants ==
=== Seeds ===
Country	Player	Rank	Seed
UKR	Yulia Starodubtseva	138	1
ITA	Lucrezia Stefanini	145	2
CRO	Jana Fett	148	3
HUN	Panna Udvardy	150	4
GER	Ella Seidel	151	5
FRA	Chloé Paquet	154	6
ROU	Irina Bara	155	7
SUI	Simona Waltert	159	8

- Rankings are as of 15 April 2024.

=== Other entrants ===
The following players received wildcards into the singles main draw:

- (Portugal) Matilde Jorge
- Miroslava Medvedeva
- (France) Kristina Mladenovic
- (Portugal) Amália Suciu

The following players received entry from the qualifying draw:

- (Sweden) Mirjam Björklund
- (Poland) Maja Chwalińska
- Aliona Falei
- (Croatia) Tena Lukas
- (Italy) Camilla Rosatello
- (Czech Republic) Anna Sisková
- (Canada) Marina Stakusic
- (France) Harmony Tan
