= 2023 Oeiras CETO Open – Singles =

Singles
- 2023 Oeiras CETO Open

Final
- Champion: (Uzbekistan) Nigina Abduraimova
- Runner-up: (Portugal) Francisca Jorge
- Score: 1–6, 6–4, 6–3

Events
Singles	Doubles
← 2022 ·	Oeiras CETO Open	· 2024 →

Diana Shnaider was the defending champion but chose not to participate.

Nigina Abduraimova won the title, defeating Francisca Jorge in the final, 1–6, 6–4, 6–3.

== Seeds ==
1. (Australia) Olivia Gadecki (first round)
2. (Austria) Sinja Kraus (second round, retired)
3. (France) Elsa Jacquemot (quarterfinals)
4. (Belgium) Greet Minnen (semifinals)
5. (Uzbekistan) Nigina Abduraimova (champion)
6. (Mexico) Fernanda Contreras (semifinals)
7. (Belgium) Magali Kempen (second round)
8. (Germany) Mona Barthel (first round)

== Draw ==
=== Key ===
- Q = Qualifier
- WC = Wild card
- LL = Lucky loser
- Alt = Alternate
- SE = Special exempt
- PR = Protected ranking
- ITF = ITF entry
- JE = Junior exempt
- w/o = Walkover
- r = Retired
- d = Defaulted
- SR = Special ranking

=== Finals ===
Semifinals
5	(Uzbekistan) Nigina Abduraimova	7^{7}	6
4	(Belgium) Greet Minnen	6^{5}	3
6	(Mexico) Fernanda Contreras	4	2
(Portugal) Francisca Jorge	6	6

Final
5	(Uzbekistan) Nigina Abduraimova	1	6	6
(Portugal) Francisca Jorge	6	4	3

=== Top half ===
First round
1	(Australia) O Gadecki	7^{12}	5	4
Y Hatouka	6^{10}	7	6
Q	(Hungary) A Nagy	6	6
WC	(Portugal) S Lança	2	1
(Finland) A Kulikova	2	6	3
(Czech Republic) M Bayerlová	6	4	6
(Chinese Taipei) J Garland	1	2
5	(Uzbekistan) N Abduraimova	6	6
4	(Belgium) G Minnen	6	6
(India) K Thandi	2	3
Q	(Spain) L Cortez Llorca	3	0
(Bosnia and Herzegovina) N Berberović	6	6
Q	(Germany) C Sauvant	2	5
(Lithuania) J Mikulskytė	6	7
(Burundi) S Nahimana	4	6	7
8	(Germany) M Barthel	6	2	5

Second round
Y Hatouka	6	6
Q	(Hungary) A Nagy	1	2
(Czech Republic) M Bayerlová	2	2
5	(Uzbekistan) N Abduraimova	6	6
4	(Belgium) G Minnen	7^{7}	6
(Bosnia and Herzegovina) N Berberović	6^{4}	3
(Lithuania) J Mikulskytė	6	6
(Burundi) S Nahimana	4	4

Quarterfinals
Y Hatouka	4	4
5	(Uzbekistan) N Abduraimova	6	6
4	(Belgium) G Minnen	6	6
(Lithuania) J Mikulskytė	0	1

Semifinals
5	(Uzbekistan) N Abduraimova	7^{7}	6
4	(Belgium) G Minnen	6^{5}	3

=== Bottom half ===
First round
6	(Mexico) F Contreras	6	6
WC	(Portugal) I Murta	3	3
Q	(Norway) U Eikeri	6	1	6
WC	(Brazil) I Gamarra Martins	2	6	3
LL	E Yashina	0	1
Q	(Czech Republic) J Malečková	6	6
Q	(Japan) E Hozumi	4	4
3	(France) E Jacquemot	6	6
7	(Belgium) M Kempen	6	6
LL	(France) Y Mansouri	1	4
Q	(Romania) O Gavrilă	7^{7}	5	1
(Portugal) F Jorge	6^{3}	7	6
WC	(Portugal) A Voloshchuk	3	1
(United States) A Muhammad	6	6
Q	(Germany) Jo Steur	6	3	3
2	(Austria) S Kraus	4	6	6

Second round
6	(Mexico) F Contreras	2	6	6
Q	(Norway) U Eikeri	6	3	4
Q	(Czech Republic) J Malečková	6	4	2
3	(France) E Jacquemot	3	6	6
7	(Belgium) M Kempen	6^{8}	3
(Portugal) F Jorge	7^{10}	6
(United States) A Muhammad	6	3
2	(Austria) S Kraus	3	0^{r}

Quarterfinals
6	(Mexico) F Contreras	6	6
3	(France) E Jacquemot	3	4
(Portugal) F Jorge	6	7^{7}
(United States) A Muhammad	2	6^{3}

Semifinals
6	(Mexico) F Contreras	4	2
(Portugal) F Jorge	6	6
