= 2026 Oeiras CETO Open – Singles =

Singles
- 2026 Oeiras CETO Open

Final
- Champion: (France) Fiona Ferro
- Runner-up: (Uzbekistan) Polina Kudermetova
- Score: 6–3, 0–6, 6–1

Events
Singles	Doubles
- Oeiras CETO Open

Yuan Yue was the defending champion, but lost in the quarterfinals to Linda Klimovičová.

Fiona Ferro won the title, defeating Polina Kudermetova 6–3, 0–6, 6–1 in the final.

== Seeds ==
1. (United Kingdom) Francesca Jones (first round, retired)
2. (China) Yuan Yue (quarterfinals)
3. (Latvia) Darja Semeņistaja (quarterfinals)
4. (Canada) Bianca Andreescu (first round)
5. (Poland) Maja Chwalińska (withdrew)
6. (Belgium) Sofia Costoulas (second round)
7. (Spain) Andrea Lázaro García (first round)
8. (United States) Varvara Lepchenko (second round)

== Draw ==
Key

- Q = Qualifier
- WC = Wild card
- LL = Lucky loser
- Alt = Alternate
- ITF = ITF entry
- PR = Protected ranking
- SR = Special ranking
- SE = Special exempt
- JE = Junior exempt
- JR = Junior Accelerator Programme entrant
- CO = College Accelerator Programme entrant
- NG = Next Gen Accelerator Program entrant
- w/o = Walkover
- r = Retired
- d = Defaulted

=== Finals ===
Semifinals
Q	(Uzbekistan) Polina Kudermetova	6	6
(United States) Whitney Osuigwe	4	4
PR	(France) Fiona Ferro	6	6
(Poland) Linda Klimovičová	3	4

Final
Q	(Uzbekistan) Polina Kudermetova	3	6	1
PR	(France) Fiona Ferro	6	0	6

=== Top half ===
First round
1	(United Kingdom) F Jones	6	6^{2}	1^{r}
(Spain) G Maristany	4	7^{7}	4
Q	(Uzbekistan) P Kudermetova	5	6	6
(Switzerland) C Naef	7	0	2
WC	(Portugal) M Jorge	5	1
(Italy) L Bronzetti	7	6
(United States) CYS Lee	3	3
8	(United States) V Lepchenko	6	6
3	(Latvia) D Semeņistaja	6	6
(Germany) A-L Friedsam	4	1
(Belgium) G Minnen	4	6	1^{r}
(France) C Monnet	6	2	3
(Switzerland) J Teichmann	1	3
(United States) W Osuigwe	6	6
WC	M Medvedeva	1	2
LL	(United States) A Akli	6	6

Second round
(Spain) G Maristany	7	4	4
Q	(Uzbekistan) P Kudermetova	5	6	6
(Italy) L Bronzetti	6	7
8	(United States) V Lepchenko	1	5
3	(Latvia) D Semeņistaja	w/o
(France) C Monnet
(United States) W Osuigwe	6	6
LL	(United States) A Akli	0	1

Quarterfinals
Q	(Uzbekistan) P Kudermetova	7^{7}	6
(Italy) L Bronzetti	6^{4}	4
3	(Latvia) D Semeņistaja	5	4
(United States) W Osuigwe	7	6

Semifinals
Q	(Uzbekistan) P Kudermetova	6	6
(United States) W Osuigwe	4	4

=== Bottom half ===
First round
6	(Belgium) S Costoulas	6	6
(Netherlands) A Koevermans	4	4
WC	(Portugal) M Ivantsiv	1	0
E Pridankina	6	6
(Australia) S Hunter	2	7	3
Q	(Czech Republic) L Havlíčková	6	5	6
PR	(France) F Ferro	6	2	6
4	(Canada) B Andreescu	0	6	4
7	(Spain) A Lázaro García	5	6	5
(Germany) M Barthel	7	3	7
(Poland) L Klimovičová	3	6	6
WC	(Portugal) A Voloshchuk	6	3	3
Q	(Malta) F Curmi	6^{7}	3
Q	A Oktiabreva	7^{9}	6
(Georgia (country)) E Gorgodze	0	1
2	(China) Y Yuan	6	6

Second round
6	(Belgium) S Costoulas	2	3
E Pridankina	6	6
Q	(Czech Republic) L Havlíčková	2	6	3
PR	(France) F Ferro	6	0	6
(Germany) M Barthel	3	3
(Poland) L Klimovičová	6	6
Q	A Oktiabreva	2	2
2	(China) Y Yuan	6	6

Quarterfinals
E Pridankina	6^{1}	1
PR	(France) F Ferro	7^{7}	6
(Poland) L Klimovičová	6	6
2	(China) Y Yuan	2	4

Semifinals
PR	(France) F Ferro	6	6
(Poland) L Klimovičová	3	4

== Qualifying ==
=== Seeds ===
1. (Uzbekistan) Polina Kudermetova (qualified)
2. Iryna Shymanovich (first round)
3. (Czech Republic) Lucie Havlíčková (qualified)
4. (Bulgaria) Elizara Yaneva (first round)
5. (United States) Claire Liu (first round)
6. (United States) Ayana Akli (qualifying round, lucky loser)
7. (Spain) Ane Mintegi del Olmo (first round)
8. (Germany) Caroline Werner (first round)

=== Qualifiers ===
1. (Uzbekistan) Polina Kudermetova
2. (Malta) Francesca Curmi
3. (Czech Republic) Lucie Havlíčková
4. Alisa Oktiabreva

=== Lucky loser ===
1. (United States) Ayana Akli

=== Qualifying draw ===
==== First qualifier ====
First round
1	(Uzbekistan) Polina Kudermetova	6	6
WC	(Portugal) Beatriz Castro	1	1
(Croatia) Lea Bošković	6	6^{1}	6
8	(Germany) Caroline Werner	3	7^{7}	2

Qualifying competition
1	(Uzbekistan) Polina Kudermetova	6	6
(Croatia) Lea Bošković	3	0

==== Second qualifier ====
First round
2	Iryna Shymanovich	6^{4}	6	6^{6}
(Romania) Elena Ruxandra Bertea	7^{7}	3	7^{8}
(Malta) Francesca Curmi	6	7
5	(United States) Claire Liu	4	5

Qualifying competition
(Romania) Elena Ruxandra Bertea	2	1
(Malta) Francesca Curmi	6	6

==== Third qualifier ====
First round
3	(Czech Republic) Lucie Havlíčková	6	6
WC	(Portugal) Kika Lima	0	1
(Serbia) Mia Ristić	6	6
7	(Spain) Ane Mintegi del Olmo	3	2

Qualifying competition
3	(Czech Republic) Lucie Havlíčková	6^{5}	7	6
(Serbia) Mia Ristić	7	5	3

==== Fourth qualifier ====
First round
4	(Bulgaria) Elizara Yaneva	4	1
Alisa Oktiabreva	6	6
(Germany) Tessa Brockmann	6	0	2
6	(United States) Ayana Akli	3	6	6

Qualifying competition
Alisa Oktiabreva	6	6
6	(United States) Ayana Akli	0	3
