= 2024 Al Habtoor Tennis Challenge – Singles =

Singles
- 2024 Al Habtoor Tennis Challenge

Final
- Champion: (United Kingdom) Jodie Burrage
- Runner-up: Polina Kudermetova
- Score: 6–3, 6–3

Events
Singles	Doubles
← 2023 ·	Al Habtoor Tennis Challenge	· 2025 →

Jodie Burrage won title, defeating Polina Kudermetova in the final, 6–3, 6–3.

Anastasia Tikhonova was the defending champion, but lost in the first round to Mei Yamaguchi.

== Seeds ==
1. Polina Kudermetova (final)
2. (Australia) Arina Rodionova (first round)
3. (Netherlands) Arianne Hartono (first round)
4. (Philippines) Alexandra Eala (semifinals)
5. Elena Pridankina (second round)
6. Anastasia Tikhonova (first round)
7. Aliona Falei (first round)
8. (Turkey) Berfu Cengiz (second round)

== Draw ==
=== Key ===
- Q = Qualifier
- WC = Wild card
- LL = Lucky loser
- Alt = Alternate
- SE = Special exempt
- PR = Protected ranking
- ITF = ITF entry
- JE = Junior exempt
- w/o = Walkover
- r = Retired
- d = Defaulted
- SR = Special ranking

=== Finals ===
Semifinals
1	Polina Kudermetova	4	6	6
4	(Philippines) Alexandra Eala	6	2	2
Q	(Belgium) Sofia Costoulas	4	3
WC	(United Kingdom) Jodie Burrage	6	6

Final
1	Polina Kudermetova	3	3
WC	(United Kingdom) Jodie Burrage	6	6

=== Top half ===
First round
1	P Kudermetova	6	6
(Switzerland) L Küng	2	2
(France) M Rouvroy	6	3	2
Q	(Germany) C Werner	4	6	6
(Canada) C Zhao	7^{7}	6
(Israel) L Glushko	6^{1}	1
Q	(Japan) M Yamaguchi	2	6	6
6	A Tikhonova	6	3	2
4	(Philippines) A Eala	6	6
Q	R Zolotareva	2	3
SR	Y Hatouka	6	7
(China) Y Ma	1	5
(Slovenia) D Jakupović	3	2
(Japan) K Okamura	6	6
Q	(Croatia) T Würth	4	2
8	(Turkey) B Cengiz	6	6

Second round
1	P Kudermetova	4	6	6
Q	(Germany) C Werner	6	4	1
(Canada) C Zhao	1	2
Q	(Japan) M Yamaguchi	6	6
4	(Philippines) A Eala	6	7
SR	Y Hatouka	3	5
(Japan) K Okamura	6	3	6
8	(Turkey) B Cengiz	4	6	0

Quarterfinals
1	P Kudermetova	0	6	6
Q	(Japan) M Yamaguchi	6	1	3
4	(Philippines) A Eala	3	6	6
(Japan) K Okamura	6	4	2

Semifinals
1	P Kudermetova	4	6	6
4	(Philippines) A Eala	6	2	2

=== Bottom half ===
First round
5	E Pridankina	6	6
Q	(Slovakia) V Morvayová	2	0
Q	(United Kingdom) F Christie	1	2
T Prozorova	6	6
Q	E Laskevich	7^{8}	6
LL	E Yashina	6^{6}	0
Q	(Belgium) S Costoulas	6	6
3	(Netherlands) A Hartono	4	2
7	A Falei	2	4
WC	(United Kingdom) J Burrage	6	6
A Charaeva	0	6	6^{2}
(Slovakia) V Hrunčáková	6	4	7^{7}
LL	(France) A Hesse	6	6
WC	(India) S Bhamidipaty	1	3
(United Kingdom) A Banks	3	7	6
2	(Australia) Ar Rodionova	6	5	3

Second round
5	E Pridankina	5	3
T Prozorova	7	6
Q	E Laskevich	3	6	3
Q	(Belgium) S Costoulas	6	1	6
WC	(United Kingdom) J Burrage	7^{7}	3	6
(Slovakia) V Hrunčáková	6^{3}	6	2
LL	(France) A Hesse	6	6
(United Kingdom) A Banks	4	3

Quarterfinals
T Prozorova	6	5	2
Q	(Belgium) S Costoulas	4	7	6
WC	(United Kingdom) J Burrage	6	6
LL	(France) A Hesse	4	4

Semifinals
Q	(Belgium) S Costoulas	4	3
WC	(United Kingdom) J Burrage	6	6
