= 2024 Oeiras CETO Open – Singles =

Singles
- 2024 Oeiras CETO Open

Final
- Champion: (Croatia) Jana Fett
- Runner-up: (Hungary) Panna Udvardy
- Score: 6–0, 6–2

Events
Singles	Doubles
- Oeiras CETO Open

Nigina Abduraimova was the defending champion but chose to compete in Lopota instead.

Jana Fett won the title after defeating Panna Udvardy in the final 6–0, 6–2.

== Seeds ==
1. (Ukraine) Yulia Starodubtseva (semifinals)
2. (Italy) Lucrezia Stefanini (second round)
3. (Croatia) Jana Fett (champion)
4. (Hungary) Panna Udvardy (final)
5. (Germany) Ella Seidel (quarterfinals)
6. (France) Chloé Paquet (first round)
7. (Romania) Irina Bara (quarterfinals)
8. (Switzerland) Simona Waltert (second round)

== Draw ==
Key

- Q = Qualifier
- WC = Wild card
- LL = Lucky loser
- Alt = Alternate
- ITF = ITF entry
- PR = Protected ranking
- SR = Special ranking
- SE = Special exempt
- JE = Junior exempt
- JR = Junior Accelerator Programme entrant
- CO = College Accelerator Programme entrant
- NG = Next Gen Accelerator Program entrant
- w/o = Walkover
- r = Retired
- d = Defaulted

=== Finals ===
Semifinals
1	(Ukraine) Yulia Starodubtseva	6	3	3
3	(Croatia) Jana Fett	2	6	6
4	(Hungary) Panna Udvardy	6	6
Polina Kudermetova	3	1

Final
3	(Croatia) Jana Fett	6	6
4	(Hungary) Panna Udvardy	0	2

=== Top half ===
First round
1	(Ukraine) Y Starodubtseva	6	6
E Makarova	3	3
(Czech Republic) G Knutson	1	2
(Portugal) F Jorge	6	6
Q	(Czech Republic) A Sisková	2	6	3
Q	A Falei	6	0	6
Q	(France) H Tan	1^{r}
5	(Germany) E Seidel	4
3	(Croatia) J Fett	6	7
Q	(Croatia) T Lukas	2	5
(Slovenia) P Hercog	6	6
Q	(Sweden) M Björklund	1	1
(Serbia) N Stevanović	6	6
(Argentina) M Capurro Taborda	3	2
(Australia) P Hon	6^{5}	6	3
7	(Romania) I Bara	7^{7}	2	6

Second round
1	(Ukraine) Y Starodubtseva	4	6	6
(Portugal) F Jorge	6	2	3
Q	A Falei	2	6	4
5	(Germany) E Seidel	6	0	6
3	(Croatia) J Fett	6	6
(Slovenia) P Hercog	0	2
(Serbia) N Stevanović	1	1
7	(Romania) I Bara	6	6

Quarterfinals
1	(Ukraine) Y Starodubtseva	6	6
5	(Germany) E Seidel	3	1
3	(Croatia) J Fett	6	6
7	(Romania) I Bara	0	3

Semifinals
1	(Ukraine) Y Starodubtseva	6	3	3
3	(Croatia) J Fett	2	6	6

=== Bottom half ===
First round
8	(Switzerland) S Waltert	6	6
WC	(Portugal) M Jorge	3	3
(Australia) O Gadecki	7^{7}	4	1
Q	(Italy) C Rosatello	6^{3}	6	6
Q	(Canada) M Stakusic	2	4
(Croatia) L Ćirić Bagarić	6	6
WC	(Portugal) A Suciu	2	1
4	(Hungary) P Udvardy	6	6
6	(France) C Paquet	4	6	1
WC	(France) K Mladenovic	6	3	6
P Kudermetova	6	6
WC	M Medvedeva	1	1
(Czech Republic) T Martincová	6^{5}	2
(France) C Monnet	7^{7}	6
Q	(Poland) M Chwalińska	1	5
2	(Italy) L Stefanini	6	7

Second round
8	(Switzerland) S Waltert	7	6^{5}	6^{2}
Q	(Italy) C Rosatello	5	7^{7}	7^{7}
(Croatia) L Ćirić Bagarić	4	3
4	(Hungary) P Udvardy	6	6
WC	(France) K Mladenovic	6^{3}	4
P Kudermetova	7^{7}	6
(France) C Monnet	7	6
2	(Italy) L Stefanini	5	3

Quarterfinals
Q	(Italy) C Rosatello	0	6	2
4	(Hungary) P Udvardy	6	3	6
P Kudermetova	7^{7}	6
(France) C Monnet	6^{5}	3

Semifinals
4	(Hungary) P Udvardy	6	6
P Kudermetova	3	1
