= 2023 Al Habtoor Tennis Challenge – Singles =

Singles
- 2023 Al Habtoor Tennis Challenge

Final
- Champion: Anastasia Tikhonova
- Runner-up: (Netherlands) Arianne Hartono
- Score: 6–1, 6–4

Events
Singles	Doubles
← 2022 ·	Al Habtoor Tennis Challenge	· 2024 →

Elsa Jacquemot was the reigning champion, but chose not to participate.

Anastasia Tikhonova won the title, defeating Arianne Hartono in the final, 6–1, 6–4.

== Seeds ==
1. (Slovakia) Viktória Hrunčáková (second round)
2. (Ukraine) Daria Snigur (second round)
3. (Slovakia) Rebecca Šramková (quarterfinals)
4. (Australia) Arina Rodionova (first round)
5. Maria Timofeeva (second round)
6. (Czech Republic) Tereza Martincová (first round)
7. (United Kingdom) Heather Watson (semifinals)
8. Ekaterina Makarova (second round)

== Draw ==
=== Key ===
- Q = Qualifier
- WC = Wild card
- LL = Lucky loser
- Alt = Alternate
- SE = Special exempt
- PR = Protected ranking
- ITF = ITF entry
- JE = Junior exempt
- w/o = Walkover
- r = Retired
- d = Defaulted
- SR = Special ranking

=== Finals ===
Semifinals
(Uzbekistan) Nigina Abduraimova	0	4
Anastasia Tikhonova	6	6
7	(United Kingdom) Heather Watson	7^{7}	3	6^{5}
(Netherlands) Arianne Hartono	6^{2}	6	7^{7}

Final
Anastasia Tikhonova	6	6
(Netherlands) Arianne Hartono	1	4

=== Top half ===
First round
1	(Slovakia) V Hrunčáková	6	6
(Slovenia) D Jakupović	4	3
Q	(Serbia) L Radivojević	1	2
Q	(Bulgaria) I Shinikova	6	6
WC	(Germany) S Lisicki	3	4
(Uzbekistan) N Abduraimova	6	6
(Bulgaria) G Topalova	0	6^{4}
8	E Makarova	6	7^{7}
4	(Australia) A Rodionova	7	3	6^{4}
A Tikhonova	5	6	7^{7}
(India) A Raina	2	2
Q	(United Kingdom) E Appleton	6	6
Q	(Switzerland) L Küng	5	5
(Croatia) T Lukas	7	7
Y Hatouka	6	7^{7}
6	(Czech Republic) T Martincová	4	6^{5}

Second round
1	(Slovakia) V Hrunčáková	6^{5}	6	3
Q	(Bulgaria) I Shinikova	7^{7}	1	6
(Uzbekistan) N Abduraimova	6	2	6
8	E Makarova	0	6	2
A Tikhonova	7^{7}	6
Q	(United Kingdom) E Appleton	6^{3}	4
(Croatia) T Lukas	4	3
Y Hatouka	6	6

Quarterfinals
Q	(Bulgaria) I Shinikova	6^{7}	2
(Uzbekistan) N Abduraimova	7^{9}	6
A Tikhonova	5	6	7
Y Hatouka	7	4	5

Semifinals
(Uzbekistan) N Abduraimova	0	4
A Tikhonova	6	6

=== Bottom half ===
First round
7	(United Kingdom) H Watson	6	7^{7}
WC	V Zvonareva	2	6^{4}
WC	(France) K Mladenovic	5	6	6
WC	(Romania) C Dinu	7	1	1
Q	E Yashina	3	2
Q	(Thailand) P Plipuech	6	6
(Serbia) N Stevanović	1	0^{r}
3	(Slovakia) R Šramková	6	2
5	M Timofeeva	5
Q	(Ukraine) K Volodko	4^{r}
(Netherlands) A Hartono	6	6
(Netherlands) L Pattinama Kerkhove	1	1
(Hungary) T Babos	4	4
Q	K Zaytseva	6	6
A Zakharova	2	4
2	(Ukraine) D Snigur	6	6

Second round
7	(United Kingdom) H Watson	6	6
WC	(France) K Mladenovic	1	2
Q	(Thailand) P Plipuech	1	3
3	(Slovakia) R Šramková	6	6
5	M Timofeeva	6^{10}	6	5
(Netherlands) A Hartono	7^{12}	1	7
Q	K Zaytseva	6	6
2	(Ukraine) D Snigur	3	2

Quarterfinals
7	(United Kingdom) H Watson	6	6
3	(Slovakia) R Šramková	1	3
(Netherlands) A Hartono	7^{7}	6
Q	K Zaytseva	6^{4}	3

Semifinals
7	(United Kingdom) H Watson	7^{7}	3	6^{5}
(Netherlands) A Hartono	6^{2}	6	7^{7}
