= 2022 Al Habtoor Tennis Challenge =

Tennis tournament

- Date: 5–11 December 2022
- Edition: 25th
- Category: ITF Women's World Tennis Tour
- Prize money: $100,000+H
- Surface: Hard
- Location: Dubai, United Arab Emirates

Champions

Singles
- (France) Elsa Jacquemot

Doubles
- (Hungary) Tímea Babos / (France) Kristina Mladenovic
- Al Habtoor Tennis Challenge

The 2022 Al Habtoor Tennis Challenge was a professional tennis tournament played on outdoor hard courts. It was the twenty-fifth edition of the tournament which was part of the 2022 ITF Women's World Tennis Tour. It took place in Dubai, United Arab Emirates between 5 and 11 December 2022.

== Champions ==
=== Singles ===
- (France) Elsa Jacquemot def. (Poland) Magdalena Fręch, 7–5, 6–2

=== Doubles ===
- (Hungary) Tímea Babos / (France) Kristina Mladenovic def. (Poland) Magdalena Fręch / (Ukraine) Kateryna Volodko, 6–1, 6–3

== Singles main draw entrants ==
=== Seeds ===
Country	Player	Rank^{1}	Seed
RUS	Diana Shnaider	109	1
FRA	Kristina Mladenovic	113	2
POL	Magdalena Fręch	115	3
UKR	Daria Snigur	146	4
SVK	Viktória Kužmová	155	5
UZB	Nigina Abduraimova	169	6
RUS	Anastasia Zakharova	183	7
AUT	Sinja Kraus	195	8

- ^{1} Rankings are as of 28 November 2022.

=== Other entrants ===
The following players received wildcards into the singles main draw:

- (Hungary) Tímea Babos
- (Israel) Lina Glushko
- (Egypt) Sandra Samir
- (Slovakia) Rebecca Šramková

The following players received entry into the singles main draw using protected rankings:

- (Austria) Barbara Haas
- (Netherlands) Bibiane Schoofs

The following players received entry from the qualifying draw:

- (Romania) Cristina Dinu
- (Finland) Anastasia Kulikova
- (Thailand) Peangtarn Plipuech
- (Russia) Maria Timofeeva
- (Ukraine) Kateryna Volodko
- (Russia) Ekaterina Yashina
- (China) You Xiaodi
- (Russia) Anastasia Zolotareva
