= 2022 Al Habtoor Tennis Challenge – Doubles =

Doubles
- 2022 Al Habtoor Tennis Challenge

Final
- Champions: (Hungary) Tímea Babos (France) Kristina Mladenovic
- Runners-up: (Poland) Magdalena Fręch (Ukraine) Kateryna Volodko
- Score: 6–1, 6–3

Events
Singles	Doubles
← 2021 ·	Al Habtoor Tennis Challenge	· 2023 →

Anna Danilina and Viktória Kužmová were the defending champions but Danilina chose not to participate. Kužmová partnered alongside Rosalie van der Hoek, but lost in the first round to Magdalena Fręch and Kateryna Volodko.

Tímea Babos and Kristina Mladenovic won the title, defeating Fręch and Volodko in the final, 6–1, 6–3.

== Seeds ==
1. (Hungary) Tímea Babos / (France) Kristina Mladenovic (champions)
2. Angelina Gabueva / Anastasia Zakharova (quarterfinals)
3. (Slovakia) Viktória Kužmová / (Netherlands) Rosalie van der Hoek (first round)
4. Alena Fomina-Klotz / (Slovenia) Dalila Jakupović (semifinals)

== Draw ==
=== Key ===
- Q = Qualifier
- WC = Wild card
- LL = Lucky loser
- Alt = Alternate
- SE = Special exempt
- PR = Protected ranking
- ITF = ITF entry
- JE = Junior exempt
- w/o = Walkover
- r = Retired
- d = Defaulted
- SR = Special ranking

=== Draw ===
First round
1	(Hungary) T Babos (France) K Mladenovic	6	1	[10]
E Reyngold; M Timofeeva	2	6	[5]
(Austria) B Haas (Austria) S Kraus	6	6
WC	(Hungary) Zs Gubacsi (Hungary) K Nagy	2	2
4	A Fomina-Klotz (Slovenia) D Jakupović	6	6
(United Kingdom) F Christie (United Kingdom) A Collins	1	4
(Chinese Taipei) Y-c Hsieh (Indonesia) J Rompies	6	6
(Uzbekistan) N Abduraimova; E Yashina	4	3
(Thailand) P Plipuech (Chinese Taipei) F-h Wu	6	6
WC	(Egypt) S Samir (Bulgaria) G Topalova	2	2
(Poland) M Fręch (Ukraine) K Volodko	1	6	[10]
3	(Slovakia) V Kužmová (Netherlands) R van der Hoek	6	3	[8]
(Netherlands) J Gimbrère (Netherlands) B Schoofs	6	6
WC	(France) E Jacquemot (Cyprus) R Șerban	2	3
(United Kingdom) E Appleton (Netherlands) I Haverlag	1	4
2	A Gabueva; A Zakharova	6	6

Quarterfinals
1	(Hungary) T Babos (France) K Mladenovic	6	6
(Austria) B Haas (Austria) S Kraus	1	0
4	A Fomina-Klotz (Slovenia) D Jakupović	7^{7}	4	[10]
(Chinese Taipei) Y-c Hsieh (Indonesia) J Rompies	6^{4}	6	[7]
(Thailand) P Plipuech (Chinese Taipei) F-h Wu	3	6^{5}
(Poland) M Fręch (Ukraine) K Volodko	6	7^{7}
(Netherlands) J Gimbrère (Netherlands) B Schoofs	6	6
2	A Gabueva; A Zakharova	3	2

Semifinals
1	(Hungary) T Babos (France) K Mladenovic	6	6
4	A Fomina-Klotz (Slovenia) D Jakupović	3	3
(Poland) M Fręch (Ukraine) K Volodko	4	7^{7}	[15]
(Netherlands) J Gimbrère (Netherlands) B Schoofs	6	6^{4}	[13]

Final
1	(Hungary) T Babos (France) K Mladenovic	6	6
(Poland) M Fręch (Ukraine) K Volodko	1	3
