= 2024 Oeiras CETO Open – Doubles =

Doubles
- 2024 Oeiras CETO Open

Final
- Champions: (Portugal) Francisca Jorge (Portugal) Matilde Jorge
- Runners-up: Yana Sizikova (Chinese Taipei) Wu Fang-hsien
- Score: 6–2, 6–0

Events
Singles	Doubles
← 2023 ·	Oeiras CETO Open	· 2025 →

Fernanda Contreras Gómez and Ingrid Martins were the defending champions but Martins chose to participate in Madrid, while Contreras Gómez chose not to participate.

Francisca and Matilde Jorge won the title, defeating Yana Sizikova and Wu Fang-hsien in the final, 6–2, 6–0.

== Seeds ==
1. (Georgia (country)) Oksana Kalashnikova / (Belgium) Kimberley Zimmermann (first round)
2. Yana Sizikova / (Chinese Taipei) Wu Fang-hsien (final)
3. (Kazakhstan) Anna Danilina / (Netherlands) Bibiane Schoofs (semifinals)
4. (Czech Republic) Miriam Kolodziejová / (Czech Republic) Anna Sisková (first round)

== Draw ==
=== Key ===
- Q = Qualifier
- WC = Wild card
- LL = Lucky loser
- Alt = Alternate
- SE = Special exempt
- PR = Protected ranking
- ITF = ITF entry
- JE = Junior exempt
- w/o = Walkover
- r = Retired
- d = Defaulted
- SR = Special ranking

First round
1	(Georgia (country)) O Kalashnikova (Belgium) K Zimmermann	2	1
(Portugal) F Jorge (Portugal) M Jorge	6	6
(United Kingdom) A Barnett (United Kingdom) F Christie	6	6
(Australia) P Hon; L Marozava	0	4
4	(Czech Republic) M Kolodziejová (Czech Republic) A Sisková	2	5
(Switzerland) C Perrin (Ukraine) Y Starodubtseva	6	7
(Italy) A Moratelli (Italy) C Rosatello	6^{2}	6	[4]
(Germany) J Lohoff (Serbia) N Stevanović	7^{7}	3	[10]
WC	(Spain) L Cortez Llorca (Portugal) AF Santos	6	7^{10}
WC	(Portugal) T Franco Dias (Portugal) A Suciu	0	6^{8}
Alt	(Romania) I Bara (Romania) A Mitu	2	2
3	(Kazakhstan) A Danilina (Netherlands) B Schoofs	6	6
A Anshba (Hungary) P Udvardy	6	6
WC	(Portugal) S Lança; M Medvedeva	3	2
(France) E Lechemia (United States) S Santamaria	1	3
2	Y Sizikova (Chinese Taipei) F-h Wu	6	6

Quarterfinals
(Portugal) F Jorge (Portugal) M Jorge	6	6^{6}	[12]
(United Kingdom) A Barnett (United Kingdom) F Christie	4	7^{8}	[10]
(Switzerland) C Perrin (Ukraine) Y Starodubtseva	6	6
(Germany) J Lohoff (Serbia) N Stevanović	1	4
WC	(Spain) L Cortez Llorca (Portugal) AF Santos	3	1
3	(Kazakhstan) A Danilina (Netherlands) B Schoofs	6	6
A Anshba (Hungary) P Udvardy	4	6	[9]
2	Y Sizikova (Chinese Taipei) F-h Wu	6	4	[11]

Semifinals
(Portugal) F Jorge (Portugal) M Jorge	6	6
(Switzerland) C Perrin (Ukraine) Y Starodubtseva	2	4
3	(Kazakhstan) A Danilina (Netherlands) B Schoofs	6	6^{5}	[8]
2	Y Sizikova (Chinese Taipei) F-h Wu	2	7^{7}	[10]

Final
(Portugal) F Jorge (Portugal) M Jorge	6	6
2	Y Sizikova (Chinese Taipei) F-h Wu	2	0
