= 2023 Al Habtoor Tennis Challenge – Doubles =

2023 ITF tennis tournament

Doubles
- 2023 Al Habtoor Tennis Challenge

Final
- Champions: (Hungary) Tímea Babos; Vera Zvonareva
- Runners-up: (United Kingdom) Olivia Nicholls (United Kingdom) Heather Watson
- Score: 6–1, 2–6, [10–7]

Events
Singles	Doubles
← 2022 ·	Al Habtoor Tennis Challenge	· 2024 →

Tímea Babos and Kristina Mladenovic were the defending champions but Mladenovic chose to participate only in the singles competition. Babos defended her title with Vera Zvonareva, defeating Olivia Nicholls and Heather Watson 6–1, 2–6, [10–7] in the final.

== Seeds ==
1. (Hungary) Tímea Babos / Vera Zvonareva (champions)
2. (Slovakia) Viktória Hrunčáková / (Slovenia) Dalila Jakupović (semifinals)
3. (United Kingdom) Olivia Nicholls / (United Kingdom) Heather Watson (final)
4. (United Kingdom) Emily Appleton / (United Kingdom) Alicia Barnett (quarterfinals)

== Draw ==
=== Key ===
- Q = Qualifier
- WC = Wild card
- LL = Lucky loser
- Alt = Alternate
- SE = Special exempt
- PR = Protected ranking
- ITF = ITF entry
- JE = Junior exempt
- w/o = Walkover
- r = Retired
- d = Defaulted
- SR = Special ranking

=== Draw ===
First round
1	(Hungary) T Babos; V Zvonareva	6	6
(United Kingdom) SB Grey (Netherlands) A Hartono	1	4
E Pridankina; K Zaytseva	^{w/o}
(Uzbekistan) N Abduraimova (Serbia) N Stevanović
4	(United Kingdom) E Appleton (United Kingdom) A Barnett	4	7^{7}	[10]
(Italy) D Cherubini (Greece) D Pavlou	6	6^{4}	[8]
(India) P Thombare; A Tikhonova	3	6	[11]
A Ibragimova; A Kovaleva	6	1	[9]
E Makarova; M Timofeeva	6^{1}	7^{7}	[9]
(Thailand) L Kumkhum (Thailand) P Plipuech	7^{7}	6^{4}	[11]
(Serbia) L Radivojević (Bulgaria) I Shinikova	4	4
3	(United Kingdom) O Nicholls (United Kingdom) H Watson	6	6
(Bulgaria) E Busaad (India) J Narsinghani	0	1
(Romania) Ș Bojică; E Yashina	6	6
(Romania) C Dinu (Slovenia) N Radišić	2	2
2	(Slovakia) V Hrunčáková (Slovenia) D Jakupović	6	6

Quarterfinals
1	(Hungary) T Babos; V Zvonareva	6	6^{6}	[11]
E Pridankina; K Zaytseva	4	7^{8}	[9]
4	(United Kingdom) E Appleton (United Kingdom) A Barnett	4	3
(India) P Thombare; A Tikhonova	6	6
(Thailand) L Kumkhum (Thailand) P Plipuech	6	3	[5]
3	(United Kingdom) O Nicholls (United Kingdom) H Watson	4	6	[10]
(Romania) Ș Bojică; E Yashina	1	0
2	(Slovakia) V Hrunčáková (Slovenia) D Jakupović	6	6

Semifinals
1	(Hungary) T Babos; V Zvonareva	6	6
(India) P Thombare; A Tikhonova	4	2
3	(United Kingdom) O Nicholls (United Kingdom) H Watson	6	6
2	(Slovakia) V Hrunčáková (Slovenia) D Jakupović	0	1

Final
1	(Hungary) T Babos; V Zvonareva	6	2	[10]
3	(United Kingdom) O Nicholls (United Kingdom) H Watson	1	6	[7]
