= 2023 Oeiras CETO Open – Doubles =

Doubles
- 2023 Oeiras CETO Open

Final
- Champions: (Mexico) Fernanda Contreras (Brazil) Ingrid Gamarra Martins
- Runners-up: (Czech Republic) Jesika Malečková (Czech Republic) Renata Voráčová
- Score: 6–3, 6–2

Events
Singles	Doubles
← 2022 ·	Oeiras CETO Open	· 2024 →

Jéssica Bouzas Maneiro and Guiomar Maristany were the defending champions but chose not to participate.

Fernanda Contreras and Ingrid Gamarra Martins won the title, defeating Jesika Malečková and Renata Voráčová in the final, 6–3, 6–2.

== Seeds ==
1. (Norway) Ulrikke Eikeri / (Japan) Eri Hozumi (semifinals)
2. (United Kingdom) Alicia Barnett / (United Kingdom) Olivia Nicholls (semifinals)
3. (Mexico) Fernanda Contreras / (Brazil) Ingrid Gamarra Martins (champions)
4. (Czech Republic) Jesika Malečková / (Czech Republic) Renata Voráčová (final)

== Draw ==
=== Key ===
- Q = Qualifier
- WC = Wild card
- LL = Lucky loser
- Alt = Alternate
- SE = Special exempt
- PR = Protected ranking
- ITF = ITF entry
- JE = Junior exempt
- w/o = Walkover
- r = Retired
- d = Defaulted
- SR = Special ranking

First round
1	(Norway) U Eikeri (Japan) E Hozumi	6	6
WC	(Portugal) E Hamaliy (Portugal) S Lança	1	2
(Czech Republic) M Bayerlová (Sweden) J Cabaj Awad	7	6
(Germany) L Böhner (India) V Shinde	5	3
3	(Mexico) F Contreras (Brazil) I Gamarra Martins	6	6
(Portugal) I Murta (Germany) C Sauvant	4	3
(Australia) O Gadecki; E Yashina	6	1	[8]
(Portugal) F Jorge (Portugal) M Jorge	4	6	[10]
(Uzbekistan) N Abduraimova (Bosnia and Herzegovina) A Wagner	6	6
WC	(United States) B Brown; M Medvedeva	1	1
(France) Y Mansouri (Hungary) A Nagy	1	3
4	(Czech Republic) J Malečková (Czech Republic) R Voráčová	6	6
(Bosnia and Herzegovina) N Berberović (Romania) O Gavrilă	7^{9}	6
(Belgium) M Kempen (Belgium) G Minnen	6^{7}	4
(Netherlands) I Haverlag (Lithuania) J Mikulskytė	6^{6}	5
2	(United Kingdom) A Barnett (United Kingdom) O Nicholls	7^{8}	7

Quarterfinals
1	(Norway) U Eikeri (Japan) E Hozumi	6	2	[12]
(Czech Republic) M Bayerlová (Sweden) J Cabaj Awad	2	6	[10]
3	(Mexico) F Contreras (Brazil) I Gamarra Martins	3	6	[10]
(Portugal) F Jorge (Portugal) M Jorge	6	3	[6]
(Uzbekistan) N Abduraimova (Bosnia and Herzegovina) A Wagner	3	3
4	(Czech Republic) J Malečková (Czech Republic) R Voráčová	6	6
(Bosnia and Herzegovina) N Berberović (Romania) O Gavrilă	1	6	[5]
2	(United Kingdom) A Barnett (United Kingdom) O Nicholls	6	3	[10]

Semifinals
1	(Norway) U Eikeri (Japan) E Hozumi	6	1	[6]
3	(Mexico) F Contreras (Brazil) I Gamarra Martins	3	6	[10]
4	(Czech Republic) J Malečková (Czech Republic) R Voráčová	6	6
2	(United Kingdom) A Barnett (United Kingdom) O Nicholls	4	4

Final
3	(Mexico) F Contreras (Brazil) I Gamarra Martins	6	6
4	(Czech Republic) J Malečková (Czech Republic) R Voráčová	3	2
