= Jana Fett =

Croatian tennis player (born 1996)

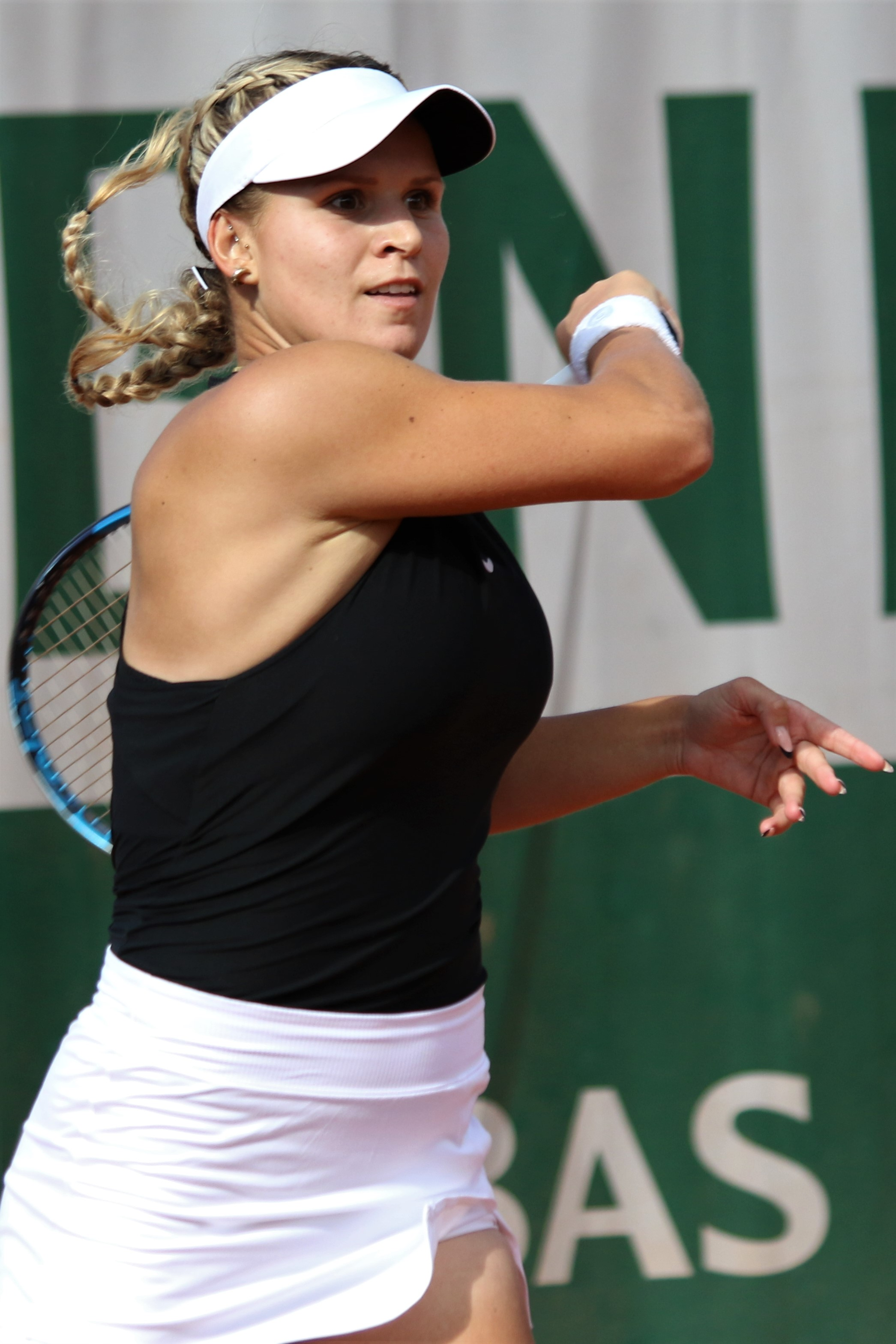
- Fett at the 2022 French Open
- Country (sports): Croatia
- Residence: Zagreb, Croatia
- Born: 2 November 1996 (age 29) Zagreb, Croatia
- Height: 1.68 m (5 ft 6 in)
- Plays: Right-handed (two-handed backhand)
- Coach: Ana Vrljić
- Prize money: $1,343,974

Singles
- Career record: 370–264
- Career titles: 9 ITF
- Highest ranking: No. 97 (30 October 2017)
- Current ranking: No. 619 (24 August 2026)

Grand Slam singles results
- Australian Open: 2R (2018)
- French Open: 2R (2024)
- Wimbledon: 1R (2018, 2022)
- US Open: Q3 (2017, 2018, 2025)

Doubles
- Career record: 59–50
- Career titles: 5 ITF
- Highest ranking: No. 348 (21 May 2018)

Team competitions
- Fed Cup: 3–7
- Last updated on: 28 August 2026.

Jana Fett (Croatian pronunciation: [jâna fêt, jǎː-]; born 2 November 1996) is a Croatian inactive tennis player. On 30 October 2017, Fett reached her best singles ranking of world No. 97, and on 21 May 2018, she set her highest doubles ranking of No. 348. Fett has won nine singles and five doubles titles on the ITF Women's Circuit.

== Career ==
=== 2014–2015 ===
On the ITF Junior Circuit, Fett had a career-high ranking of No. 12, which she achieved on 24 February 2014. She was the runner-up at the 2014 Australian Open girls' singles event, wherein she fell to Elizaveta Kulichkova in the final.

Fett's biggest title to date was at the 2015 Dunlop World Challenge, where she won the singles title defeating Luksika Kumkhum in the final.

=== 2017: WTA Tour debut, two semifinals, and top 100 ===
At the 2017 Hobart International, she qualified for her first main draw of a WTA tournament. She reached her first WTA Tour semifinal but lost to eventual champion and fellow qualifier, Elise Mertens.

Later in the year, she reached her second semifinal at the Japan Women's Open, again coming through qualifying, while also scoring her first victory over a top-20 player, the top seed Kristina Mladenovic. She lost to fellow qualifier Miyu Kato, after failing to convert a match point. As a result, she made her top 100 debut on 18 September 2017.

=== 2018: Major debut and first win ===
At the 2018 Australian Open, she appeared in the main draw of a Grand Slam tournament for the first time as a direct entry and recorded her first major win over Misa Eguchi. In the second round, she played against second seed Caroline Wozniacki and had two match points, leading 40/15 at 5–1 in the third set. However, she lost that game and the successive five games to yield the match to the eventual tournament champion.

=== 2022–2024: WTA 125 final, Roland Garros & WTA 1000 debuts ===
She qualified for the main draw of the 2022 Wimbledon Championships after three years of absence at the All England Club where she lost to world No. 1, Iga Świątek.

She reached the final at the WTA 125 2023 Midland Tennis Classic but lost to first-time WTA Challenger titlist Anna Kalinskaya.

In April 2024, Fett won the biggest title in her career at the W100 Oeiras Open. On her debut at the French Open, she entered the main draw as a lucky loser and recorded a first round win over Jéssica Bouzas Maneiro, then losing her next match to Marie Bouzková.

At the Jasmin Open, Fett reached the second round defeating Mayar Sherif before losing to Sara Sorribes Tormo in three sets. The following week at the 2024 Thailand Open 2, she reached the quarterfinals, after defeating Zheng Saisai, and eighth seed Varvara Gracheva by retirement, before going out to eventual champion Rebecca Šramková.

She entered the main draw of the WTA 1000 China Open as a lucky loser making her debut at this level, and recorded her first WTA 1000 win over wildcard entrant Wang Meiling. Fett lost in the second round to ninth seed Daria Kasatkina.

=== 2026: Anti-doping suspension ===
In January, the International Tennis Integrity Agency (ITIA) announced that Fett had been provisionally suspended since 22 December 2025, after testing positive for three prohibited substances, namely ostarine, GW501516 and LGD-4033, while representing Croatia in the BJK Cup on 16 November 2025.

== Grand Slam performance timeline ==
Key
W	F	SF	QF	#R	RR	Q#	P#	DNQ	A	Z#	PO	G	S	B	NMS	NTI	P	NH

(W) winner; (F) finalist; (SF) semifinalist; (QF) quarterfinalist; (#R) rounds 4, 3, 2, 1; (RR) round-robin stage; (Q#) qualification round; (P#) preliminary round; (DNQ) did not qualify; (A) absent; (Z#) Davis/Fed Cup Zonal Group (with number indication) or (PO) play-off; (G) gold, (S) silver or (B) bronze Olympic/Paralympic medal; (NMS) not a Masters tournament; (NTI) not a Tier I tournament; (P) postponed; (NH) not held; (SR) strike rate (events won / competed); (W–L) win–loss record.
To avoid confusion and double counting, these charts are updated at the conclusion of a tournament or when the player's participation has ended.

Tournament	2016	2017	2018	2019	2020	2021	2022	2023	2024	2025	W–L
Australian Open	Q2	A	2R	Q1	A	Q2	Q2	A	Q1	1R	1–2
French Open	A	Q2	Q1	A	Q1	Q2	Q1	A	2R	Q2	1–1
Wimbledon	A	Q3	1R	A	NH	Q2	1R	A	Q1	Q3	0–2
US Open	A	Q3	Q3	A	A	Q1	A	A	Q1	Q3	0–0
Win–loss	0–0	0–0	1–2	0–0	0–0	0–0	0–1	0–0	1–1	0–1	2–5

== WTA 125 finals ==
=== Singles: 1 runner-up ===
Result	W–L	Date	Tournament	Surface	Opponent	Score
Loss	0–1	Nov 2023	Midland Tennis Classic, United States	Hard (i)	Anna Kalinskaya	5–7, 4–6

== ITF Circuit finals ==
=== Singles: 14 (9 titles, 5 runner-ups) ===
Legend W100 tournaments (1–0) $75,000 tournaments (1–0) W60/75 tournaments (1–1) W25 tournaments (2–3) W10/15 tournaments (4–0)	Finals by surface Hard (5–3) Clay (3–1) Carpet (1–1)

Result	W–L	Date	Tournament	Tier	Surface	Opponent	Score
Win	1–0	Aug 2014	ITF Ostrava, Czech Republic	10,000	Clay	(Czech Republic) Lenka Kunčíková	6–4, 6–3
Loss	1–1	Sep 2014	ITF Bol, Croatia	10,000	Clay	(Croatia) Iva Mekovec	4–6, 1–6
Win	2–1	Dec 2014	ITF İstanbul, Turkey	10,000	Hard (i)	(Ukraine) Olga Ianchuk	6–2, 6–4
Win	3–1	Apr 2015	ITF Dijon, France	15,000	Hard (i)	(Ukraine) Marianna Zakarlyuk	6–3, 6–4
Loss	3–2	Oct 2015	ITF Istanbul, Turkey	25,000	Hard (i)	(Serbia) Ivana Jorović	3–6, 5–7
Win	4–2	Nov 2015	GB Pro-Series Loughborough, UK	15,000	Hard (i)	(Italy) Cristiana Ferrando	6–2, 6–1
Win	5–2	Nov 2015	Toyota World Challenge, Japan	75,000	Carpet (i)	(Thailand) Luksika Kumkhum	6–4, 4–6, 6–4
Loss	5–3	Nov 2019	ITF Solarino, Italy	W25	Carpet	(Italy) Giulia Gatto-Monticone	6–2, 3–6, 5–7
Loss	5–4	Apr 2022	ITF Nottingham, UK	W25	Hard	(Hong Kong) Eudice Chong	2–6, ret.
Win	6–4	Oct 2022	Trnava Indoor, Slovakia	W25	Hard (i)	(Hungary) Natália Szabanin	6–3, 6–2
Win	7–4	Aug 2023	ITF Vigo, Spain	W25	Hard	(Netherlands) Lesley Pattinama Kerkhove	6–7^{(5)}, 6–3, 6–1
Loss	7–5	Oct 2023	Toronto Challenger, Canada	W60	Hard (i)	(Canada) Marina Stakusic	6–3, 5–7, 3–6
Win	8–5	Apr 2024	Split Open, Croatia	W75	Clay	(Turkey) İpek Öz	6–0, 6–4
Win	9–5	Apr 2024	Oerias Open, Portugal	W100	Clay	(Hungary) Panna Udvardy	6–0, 6–2

=== Doubles: 10 (5 titles, 5 runner-ups) ===
Legend W75 tournaments W25 tournaments (2–3) W10 tournaments (3–2)	Finals by surface Hard (3–4) Clay (1–1) Carpet (1–0)

Result	W–L	Date	Tournament	Tier	Surface	Partner	Opponents	Score
Loss	0–1	Apr 2013	ITF Bol, Croatia	10,000	Clay	(United States) Bernarda Pera	(Czech Republic) Barbora Krejčíková (Russia) Polina Leykina	3–6, 3–6
Win	1–1	Mar 2014	ITF Sharm El Sheikh, Egypt	10,000	Hard	(Ukraine) Oleksandra Korashvili	(Egypt) Ola Abou Zekry (Egypt) Mayar Sherif	6–4, 7–5
Win	2–1	Aug 2014	ITF Vinkovci, Croatia	10,000	Clay	(Croatia) Adrijana Lekaj	(Hungary) Lilla Barzó (Hungary) Ágnes Bukta	6–3, 7–5
Win	3–1	Dec 2014	ITF İstanbul, Turkey	10,000	Hard (i)	(Croatia) Adrijana Lekaj	(Turkey) Ayla Aksu (Turkey) İpek Soylu	6–3, 6–4
Loss	3–2	Mar 2015	ITF Oslo, Norway	10,000	Hard (i)	(Croatia) Adrijana Lekaj	(Poland) Justyna Jegiołka (Netherlands) Eva Wacanno	1–6, 1–6
Loss	3–3	Oct 2015	ITF Istanbul, Turkey	25,000	Hard (i)	(Romania) Cristina Dinu	(Turkey) Başak Eraydın (Russia) Polina Leykina	5–7, 7–6^{(2)}, [5–10]
Win	4–3	Oct 2016	ITF Hamamatsu, Japan	25,000	Carpet	(Japan) Ayaka Okuno	(Chinese Taipei) Hsu Chieh-yu (Poland) Justyna Jegiołka	4–6, 7–6^{(5)}, [12–10]
Loss	4–4	Feb 2019	GB Pro-Series Glasgow, UK	25,000	Hard (i)	(United Kingdom) Freya Christie	(Netherlands) Lesley Kerkhove (Germany) Anna Zaja	4–6, 6–3, [3–10]
Win	5–4	May 2019	Torneo Conchita Martínez, Spain	25,000	Hard	(Hungary) Dalma Gálfi	(Greece) Despina Papamichail (Serbia) Nina Stojanović	7–6^{(2)}, 6–2
Loss	5–5	Oct 2020	ITF Porto, Portugal	25,000	Hard	(New Zealand) Erin Routliffe	(United States) Jamie Loeb (Mexico) Ana Sofía Sánchez	6–2, 3–6, [8–10]

== Fed Cup/Billie Jean King Cup participation ==
=== Singles (0–6) ===
Edition	Stage	Date	Location	Against	Surface	Opponent	W/L	Score
2019	Z1 R/R	7 February 2019	Bath (GBR)	(Georgia (country)) Georgia	Hard (i)	Ekaterine Gorgodze	L	6–4, 3–6, 5–7
2019	Z1 R/R	8 February 2019	Bath (GBR)	Serbia	Hard (i)	Olga Danilović	L	6–2, 2–6, 6–7^{(7–9)}
2019	Z1 P/O	9 February 2019	Bath (GBR)	Hungary	Hard (i)	Réka Luca Jani	L	6–3, 2–5 ret.
2020	Z1 R/R	5 February 2020	Tallinn (EST)	Bulgaria	Hard (i)	Viktoriya Tomova	L	2–6, 4–6
2020	Z1 R/R	7 February 2020	Tallinn (EST)	Ukraine	Hard (i)	Elina Svitolina	L	3–6, 6–3, 1–6
2020	Z1 P/O	8 February 2020	Tallinn (EST)	Italy	Hard (i)	Camila Giorgi	L	6–7^{(4–7)}, 4–6

=== Doubles (3–1) ===
Edition	Stage	Date	Location	Against	Surface	Partner	Opponents	W/L	Score
2019	Z1 R/R	6 February 2019	Bath (GBR)	Turkey	Hard (i)	Darija Jurak	Çağla Büyükakçay; Pemra Özgen	W	6–4, 6–4
2020	Z1 R/R	5 February 2020	Tallinn (EST)	Bulgaria	Hard (i)	Darija Jurak	Isabella Shinikova; Viktoriya Tomova	W	6–2, 3–6, 6–1
2025	P/O	15 November 2025	Varaždin, Croatia	Colombia	Hard (i)	Petra Marčinko	Yuliana Lizarazo; Camila Osorio	W	6–4, 6–3
2025	P/O	16 November 2025	Varaždin, Croatia	Czech Republic	Hard (i)	Petra Marčinko	Lucie Havlíčková; Linda Nosková	L	2–6, 6–3, 3–6

=== Head-to-head records ===
==== Double bagel matches (6–0, 6–0) ====
Result	W–L	Year	Tournament	Tier	Surface	Opponent	Rank	Rd
Loss	0–1	2023	Hong Kong Open	WTA 250	Hard	(Russia) Anastasia Pavlyuchenkova	No. 61	1R

== Junior finals ==
=== Grand Slam tournaments ===
==== Girls' singles: 1 (runner–up) ====
Result	Year	Tournament	Surface	Opponent	Score
Loss	2014	Australian Open	Hard	(Russia) Elizaveta Kulichkova	2–6, 1–6
