= Fiona Ferro =

French-Belgian tennis player (born 1997)

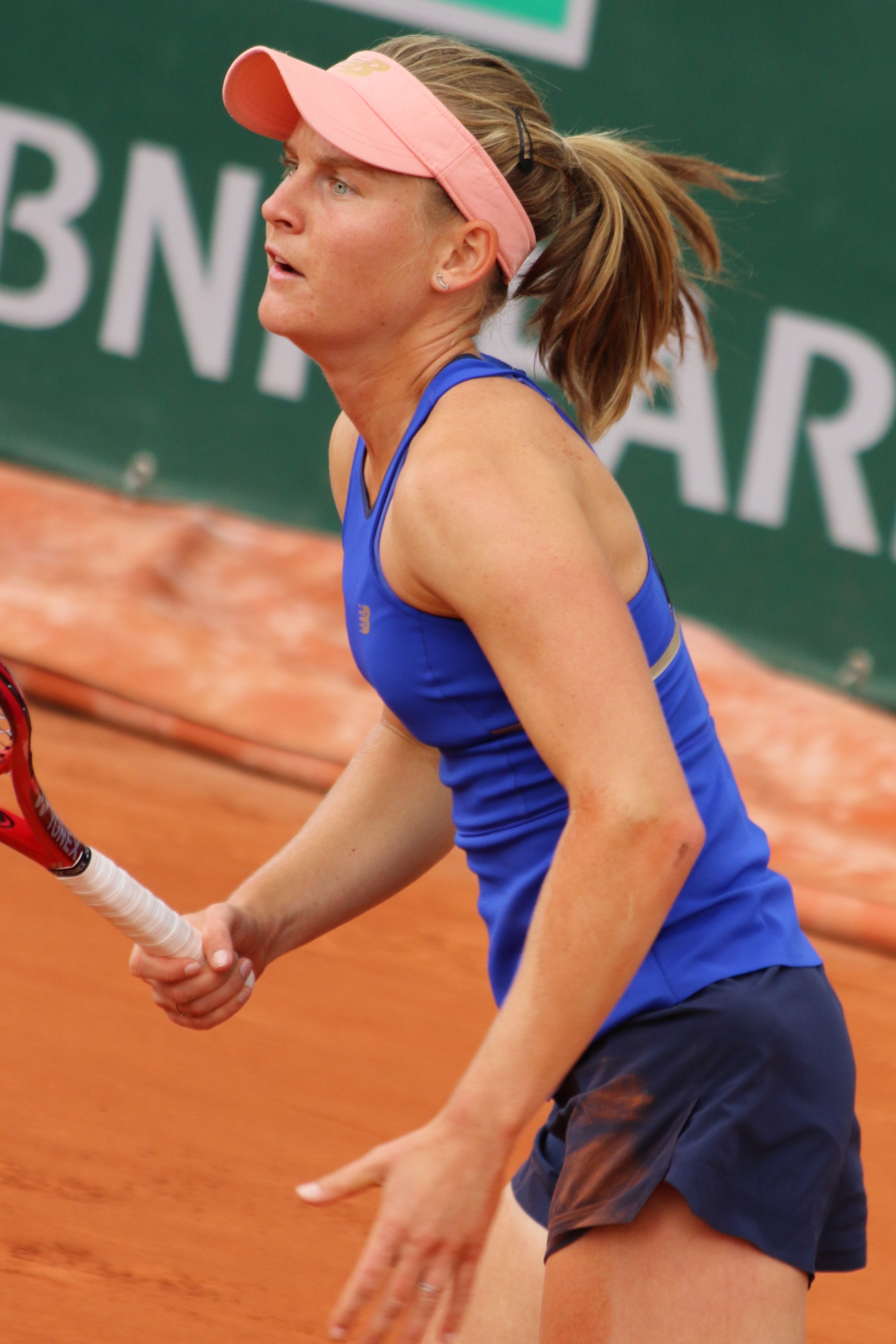
- Ferro at the 2019 French Open
- Country (sports): France
- Residence: Valbonne, France
- Born: 12 March 1997 (age 29) Libramont, Belgium
- Height: 1.70 m (5 ft 7 in)
- Turned pro: 2012
- Plays: Right-handed (two-handed backhand)
- Coach: Pierre Bouteyre (2010-Jun 2016); Georges Goven (Feb 2017-Sep 2017); Stéphane Huet (Sep 2017-Oct 2019); Emmanuel Planque (Dec 2019-Nov 2021)
- Prize money: $2,861,884

Singles
- Career record: 355–276
- Career titles: 2 WTA, 2 WTA 125
- Highest ranking: No. 39 (8 March 2021)
- Current ranking: No. 105 (12 October 2026)

Grand Slam singles results
- Australian Open: 3R (2021)
- French Open: 4R (2020)
- Wimbledon: 1R (2019, 2021)
- US Open: 3R (2019)

Other tournaments
- Olympic Games: 2R (2021)

Doubles
- Career record: 31–62
- Career titles: 1 ITF
- Highest ranking: No. 257 (17 May 2021)
- Current ranking: No. 502 (12 October 2026)

Grand Slam doubles results
- Australian Open: 1R (2020, 2021)
- French Open: 3R (2019)
- Wimbledon: 1R (2021)
- US Open: 2R (2021)

Other doubles tournaments
- Olympic Games: 2R (2021)

Grand Slam mixed doubles results
- French Open: 1R (2018, 2024)

Other mixed doubles tournaments
- Olympic Games: 1R (2021)

Team competitions
- Fed Cup: 0–2
Medal record
Tennis
Representing France
Mediterranean Games
Silver medal – second place	2018 Tarragona	Singles
- Last updated on: 15 October 2026.

Fiona Ferro (born 12 March 1997) is a French-Belgian professional tennis player. She has career-high WTA rankings of No. 39 in singles, attained on 8 March 2021, and No. 257 in doubles, reached on 17 May 2021. Ferro has won two singles titles on the WTA Tour and two at WTA 125 tournaments.

== Early life ==
Fiona Ferro was born on 12 March 1997 in Libramont-Chevigny, Belgium, to a Belgian mother, Catherine, and a French-Italian father, Fabrizio. Her parents owned a restaurant in Belgium before moving to southern France when she was one year old. She has two older brothers, Gianni and Paolo, and a younger brother, Flavio. By 2018, her parents owned two hotels in Valbonne, France, while her older brothers operated an Italian restaurant in the town.

Ferro began playing tennis in Valbonne at around the age of eight, following the example of her two older brothers. Before taking up tennis, she had tried other sports, including dancing and basketball. By the age of 12, she was pursuing her education through distance learning to accommodate her tennis training.

== Career ==
=== Juniors ===
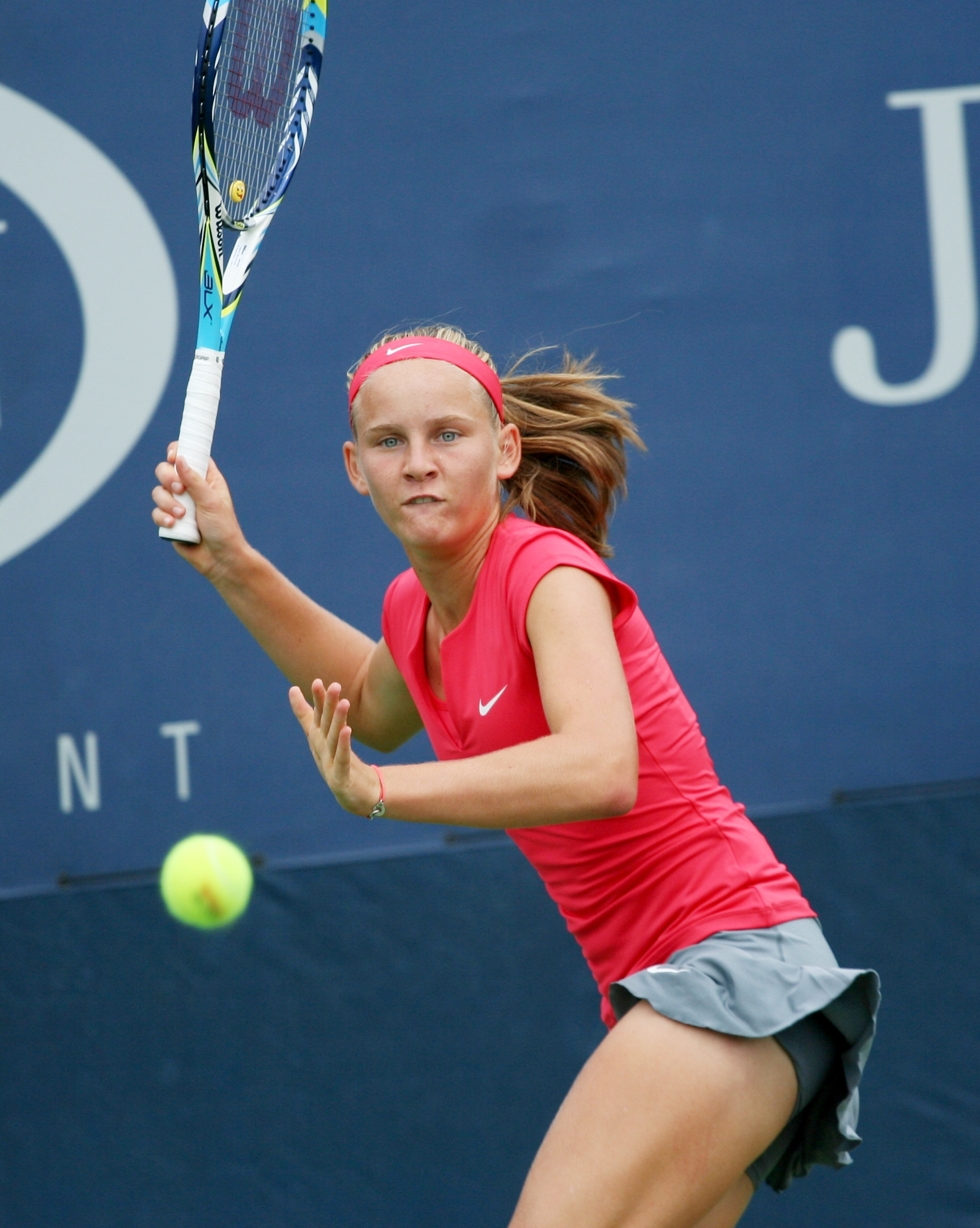
Ferro at the 2013 US Open in junior edition

Ferro was the national girls' champion of France in the 12-13 year-old, 15-16 year-old and 17-18 year-old categories. She had a career-high ITF junior combined ranking of world No. 27, attained on 3 June 2013.

=== 2012–2016: WTA Tour debut ===
Ferro made her ITF Women's Circuit debut at the $25k indoor hardcourt tournament held in late January 2012 in Grenoble, France; she only entered that tournament's singles competition, losing in the first round of qualifying. She played (only in the singles draws of) eight tournaments on the 2012 ITF Circuit.

She played (only in the singles draws of) eleven tournaments on the 2013 ITF Circuit. Her 2013 year-end WTA singles ranking was 557, compared to world No. 1062 on 11 February 2013.

Ferro made her WTA Tour singles debut at the 2014 Internationaux de Strasbourg; as a wildcard, she lost in the first qualifying round to Yuliya Beygelzimer.

She made her major singles debut at the 2014 French Open, after receiving a wildcard for the singles main draw, before losing in the first round to 16th seed Sabine Lisicki.

In June 2016, Ferro ended her player-coach collaboration with Pierre Bouteyre. He had been her coach since 2010.

Ferro then made her WTA 125 singles debut at the 2016 Open de Limoges, after receiving a wildcard for the main draw, wherein she lost in the first round to the unseeded Ivana Jorović.

=== 2017: Success in qualifying rounds ===
At the end of February, Ferro played her year-first and just her third career WTA Tour singles main-draw match at the Mexican Open, after defeating two higher-ranked players (Samantha Crawford and Tatjana Maria) in qualifying matches, losing in the first round to fifth seed Christina McHale. In April, Ferro played her second and third Tour singles main-draw matches of 2017 in Bogotá and Istanbul, respectively, after winning two qualifying matches in each tournament; she lost in the first round to seeded players (to Johanna Larsson in Bogotá and Sorana Cîrstea in Istanbul) in both tournaments.

At the end of 2017, Ferro moved to Paris to train at the Centre National d'Entraînement (CNE) to take advantage of the facilities there. Her tennis coach was Stéphane Huet, and she also had a fitness coach and a mental coach that she shared with other players training at the CNE.

=== 2018: First ITF title, top 100 ===
On 11 February, Ferro won her first ITF singles title in Grenoble. She had to win three qualifying matches to reach the singles main-draw of a WTA Tour event for the first time in 2018, at the International tournament in Rabat, losing in the first round to another qualifier, Paula Badosa Gibert. Ferro also played in Strasbourg, where she had entered the singles main draw as a wildcard, losing in the first round to the sixth seed Tímea Babos.

Ferro received a singles main-draw wildcard for the French Open, just like she did in 2014, 2015 and 2017. She won the first Grand Slam singles main-draw match of her career and also picked up her first career win over a player ranked in the top-100 at the French Open when she defeated world No. 61, Carina Witthöft, in the first round. She lost to third seed Garbiñe Muguruza in the second round.

On 22 October 2018, Ferro attained a career-high of world No. 100 in the singles rankings and became the 43rd Frenchwoman to break inside the top 100 of those rankings.

=== 2019: First WTA Tour title ===
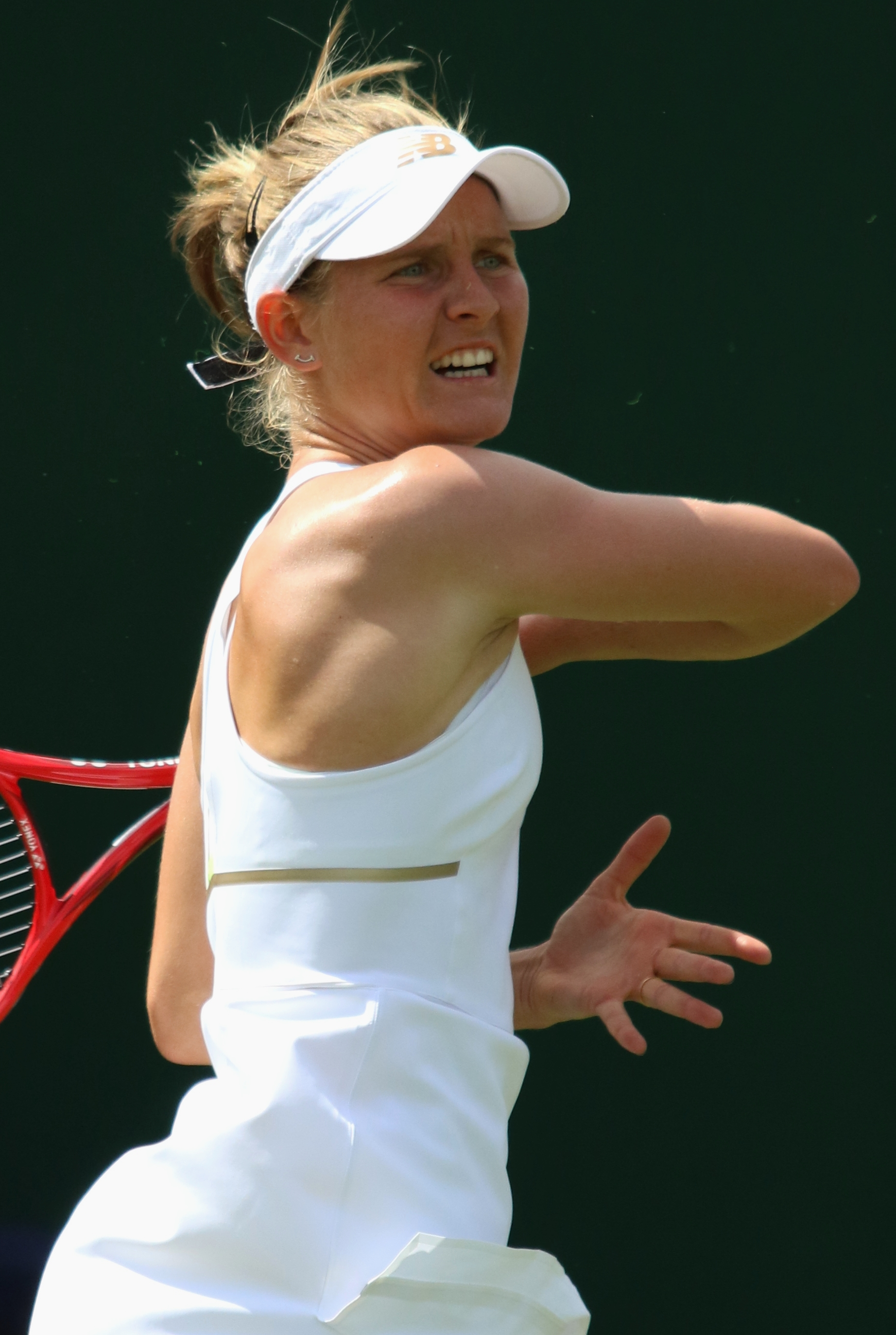
Ferro at the 2019 Wimbledon Championships

In early February, Ferro was selected for the first time in the France Fed Cup team, for the Fed Cup World Group quarterfinal against Belgium. She played only the doubles match (partnering Pauline Parmentier), which was a dead rubber, of that tie, which France won 3–1. She and Parmentier lost their match against Ysaline Bonaventure and Kirsten Flipkens in three sets.

In July, Ferro won her first Tour singles title in Lausanne, beating defending champion Alizé Cornet in the final.

On 18 December 2019, Ferro announced on her Instagram account that Emmanuel Planque would henceforth be her new coach. Her two-year player-coach collaboration with Stéphane Huet had ended at the end of October 2019.

=== 2020: French Open 4th round, top 50 ===
On 9 August, Ferro won her second WTA Tour title, defeating Anett Kontaveit in the final of the Palermo Ladies Open. This was the first tournament since the tour had shut down due to the coronavirus pandemic.

Ferro reached the fourth round of the French Open, her best showing at a Grand Slam tournament in her career thus far, where she was defeated by fourth seed and eventual runner-up, Sofia Kenin.

Ferro finished the year in the top 50, at No. 42, for the first time in her career.

=== 2021–2022: Major 3rd round, career-high ranking, Olympics ===
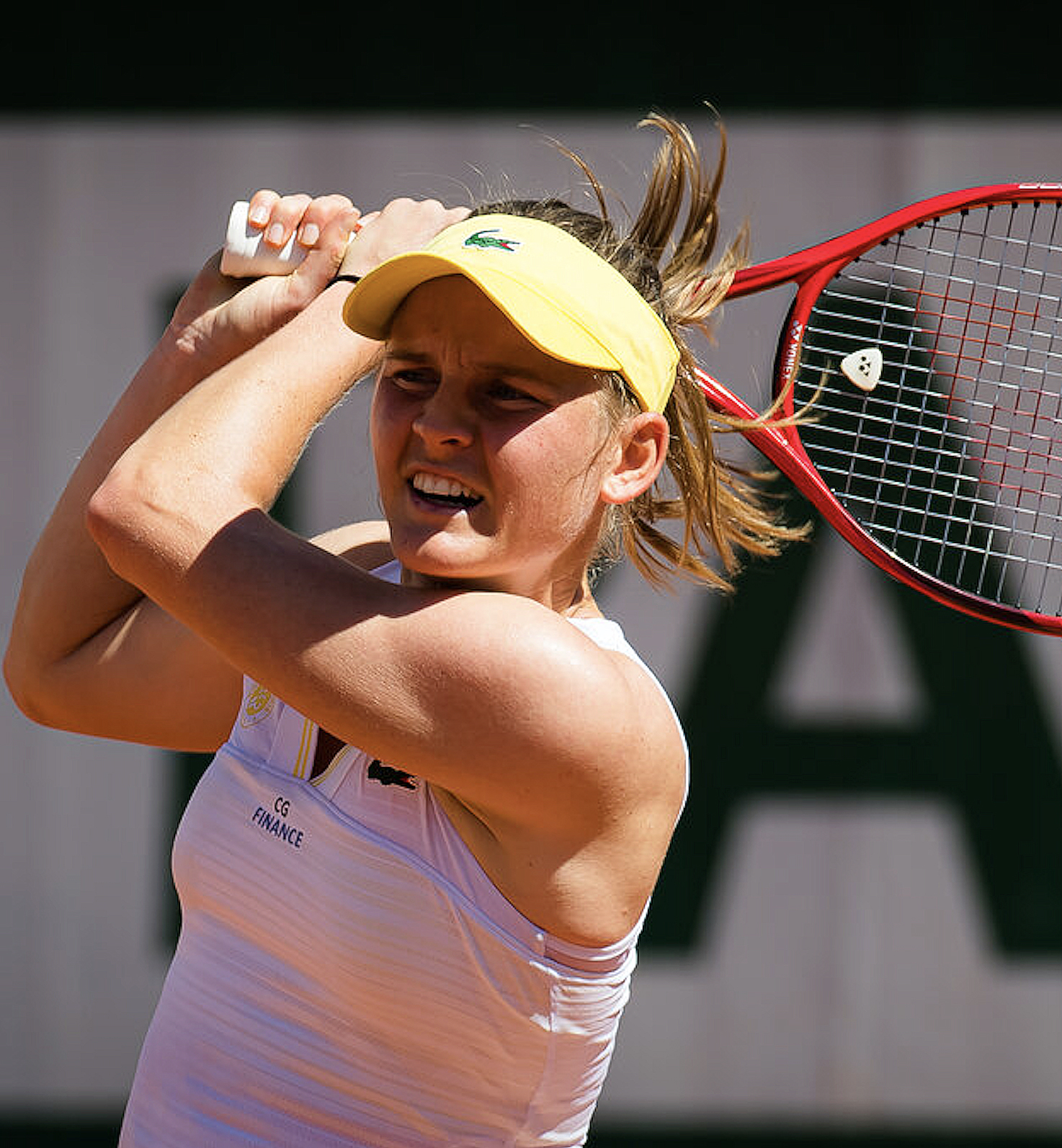
Ferro at Roland Garros, 2021

Ferro reached the third round of the 2021 Australian Open, her best showing at this Grand Slam event in her career so far, defeating 17th seed Elena Rybakina before falling to 15th seed Iga Świątek. She reached a career-high of No. 39 on 8 March 2021.

After that, her season was plagued by injuries, including one in April that forced her to retire from her quarterfinal in Istanbul, and then one injury (foot) before Roland Garros. She still managed to deliver, despite the loss, a great fight against 13th seed Jennifer Brady in the second round (losing 5–7 in the third set). After a winless grass-court season, Ferro came back on clay and reached the quarterfinals in Lausanne, beaten by compatriot Clara Burel. She was defeated in the second round of the Olympic Games in Tokyo by Sara Sorribes Tormo. Ferro came close to upsetting Iga Świątek in the second round of the 2021 US Open: she was up 6–3, 2–0, but lost 6–3, 6–7, 0–6.

Ferro then reached the semifinals of the tournament of Santa Fe in California, where she retired in the third set against Elvina Kalieva (at 6–4, 4–6, 0–3). During her last two events of the year, she lost against the Canadian Françoise Abanda in the Billie Jean King Cup finals, and then against Aliaksandra Sasnovich in the first round in Upper Austria Ladies Linz, both times in three sets.

=== 2023–2026: WTA 125 title, back to top 200 ===
Ranked No. 462, Ferro qualified for the main-draw of the 2023 French Open, having received a wildcard entry for the qualifying tournament. She lost in the first round to Rebecca Peterson.

She reached her first WTA 125 final at the 2023 Barranquilla Open, losing to top seed Tatjana Maria in straight sets.

Ferro qualified for the 2024 Australian Open, making her fifth appearance in Melbourne, but went out in the first round to McCartney Kessler.

She won her first WTA 125 title at the 2026 Oeiras Open, defeating Polina Kudermetova in the final. As a result, she returned to the top 200 in the singles rankings on 4 May 2026. In July 2026, Ferro was runner-up at the WTA 125 Palermo Ladies Open, losing to top seed and defending champion Francesca Jones in the final which was decided in a third set tiebreak.

Seeded fourth, Ferro won her second WTA 125 title at the Montreux Ladies Open in September 2026, defeating Noma Noha Akugue in the final.

== Personal life ==
In February 2022, Ferro filed a criminal complaint against her former coach, Pierre Bouteyre, alleging repeated rape and sexual assault between 2012 and 2015, when she was aged between 15 and 18. Bouteyre was formally placed under investigation in August 2022. He acknowledged having had a relationship with Ferro but denied the allegations of rape and maintained that the relationship had been consensual. In November 2025, the Aix-en-Provence Court of Appeal upheld the decision to send Bouteyre to trial before the criminal court of Var.

== Performance timelines ==
Key
W	F	SF	QF	#R	RR	Q#	P#	DNQ	A	Z#	PO	G	S	B	NMS	NTI	P	NH

(W) winner; (F) finalist; (SF) semifinalist; (QF) quarterfinalist; (#R) rounds 4, 3, 2, 1; (RR) round-robin stage; (Q#) qualification round; (P#) preliminary round; (DNQ) did not qualify; (A) absent; (Z#) Davis/Fed Cup Zonal Group (with number indication) or (PO) play-off; (G) gold, (S) silver or (B) bronze Olympic/Paralympic medal; (NMS) not a Masters tournament; (NTI) not a Tier I tournament; (P) postponed; (NH) not held; (SR) strike rate (events won / competed); (W–L) win–loss record.
To avoid confusion and double counting, these charts are updated at the conclusion of a tournament or when the player's participation has ended.

Only main-draw results in WTA Tour, Grand Slam tournaments, Billie Jean King Cup, United Cup, Hopman Cup and Olympic Games are included in win–loss records.

=== Singles ===
Current through the 2024 Wimbledon Championships.

Tournament	2014	2015	2016	2017	2018	2019	2020	2021	2022	2023	2024	SR	W–L	Win %
Grand Slam tournaments
Australian Open	A	Q1	A	A	A	1R	2R	3R	1R	A	1R	0 / 5	3–5	38%
French Open	1R	1R	Q3	1R	2R	1R	4R	2R	1R	1R	1R	0 / 10	5–10	33%
Wimbledon	A	A	A	A	A	1R	NH	1R	Q3	A	Q1	0 / 2	0–2	0%
US Open	Q1	A	A	A	Q2	3R	A	2R	Q1	1R	A	0 / 3	3–3	50%
Win–Loss	0–1	0–1	0–0	0–1	1–1	2–4	4–2	4–4	0–2	0–2	0–2	0 / 20	11–20	35%
National representation
Summer Olympics	NH		A	NH				2R	NH		A	0 / 1	1–1	50%
Billie Jean King Cup (Note: Formerly known as Fed Cup until 2020.)	A	A	A	A	A	W	RR (Note: Edition is split into the two years due to COVID-19.)		A	A	A	1 / 2	0–1	0%
WTA 1000 tournaments
Qatar Open	A	NTI	A	NTI	A	NTI	A	NTI	A	NTI	A	0 / 0	0–0	–
Dubai Championships	NTI	A	NTI	A	NTI	A	NTI	A	NTI	A	A	0 / 0	0–0	–
Indian Wells Open	A	A	A	A	A	Q1	NH	1R	A	A	A	0 / 1	0–1	0%
Miami Open	A	A	A	A	A	Q1	NH	1R	A	A	A	0 / 1	0–1	0%
Madrid Open	A	A	A	A	A	A	NH	A	Q1	A	Q1	0 / 0	0–0	–
Italian Open	A	A	A	A	A	Q1	A	A	A	A	Q1	0 / 0	0–0	–
Canadian Open	A	A	A	A	A	A	NH	2R	A	A	A	0 / 1	1–1	50%
Cincinnati Open	A	A	A	A	A	A	A	Q2	A	A	A	0 / 0	0–0	–
China Open	A	A	A	A	A	A	NH			A	A	0 / 0	0–0	–
Wuhan Open	A	A	A	A	A	Q1	NH				A	0 / 0	0–0	–
Win–Loss	0–0	0–0	0–0	0–0	0–0	0–0	0–0	1–3	0–0	0–0		0 / 3	1–3	25%
Career statistics
	2014	2015	2016	2017	2018	2019	2020	2021	2022	2023	2024	SR	W–L	Win %
Tournaments	1	1	0	4	8	18	5	19	4	4		Career total: 64		
Titles	0	0	0	0	0	1	1	0	0	0		Career total:2		
Finals	0	0	0	0	0	1	1	0	0	0		Career total: 2		
Overall win–loss	0–1	0–1	0–0	0–4	5–8	16–17	11–4	14–20	1–4	0–4		1 / 64	47–63	43%
Win %	0%	0%	–	0%	38%	48%	73%	41%	20%	0%		Career total: 43%		
Year-end ranking (Note: 2013: WTA ranking–557.)	367	261	235	325	102	63	42	103	417	161		$2,265,274		

=== Doubles ===
Tournament	2016	2017	2018	2019	2020	2021	2022	2023	SR	W–L	Win %
Australian Open	A	A	A	A	1R	1R	A	A	0 / 2	0–2	0%
French Open	1R	1R	1R	3R	A	A	A	1R	0 / 5	2–5	29%
Wimbledon	A	A	A	A	NH	A	A	A	0 / 0	0–0	–
US Open	A	A	A	1R	A	2R	A	A	0 / 2	1–2	33%
Win–Loss	0–1	0–1	0–1	2–2	0–1	1–2	0–0	0–1	0 / 9	3–9	25%

== WTA Tour finals ==
=== Singles: 2 (2 titles) ===
Legend International (2–0)	Finals by surface Clay (2–0)

Result	W–L	Date	Tournament	Tier	Surface	Opponent	Score
Win	1–0	Jul 2019	Ladies Open Lausanne, Switzerland	International	Clay	(France) Alizé Cornet	6–1, 2–6, 6–1
Win	2–0	Aug 2020	Palermo Ladies Open, Italy	International	Clay	(Estonia) Anett Kontaveit	6–2, 7–5

== WTA 125 finals ==
=== Singles: 4 (2 titles, 2 runner-ups) ===
Result	W–L	Date	Tournament	Surface	Opponent	Score
Loss	0–1	Aug 2023	Barranquilla Open, Colombia	Hard	(Germany) Tatjana Maria	1–6, 2–6
Win	1–1	Apr 2026	Oeiras CETO Open, Portugal	Clay	(Uzbekistan) Polina Kudermetova	6–3, 0–6, 6–1
Loss	1–2	Jul 2026	Palermo Ladies Open, Italy	Clay	(United Kingdom) Francesca Jones	0–6, 6–4, 6–7^{(6–8)}
Win	2–2	Sep 2026	Montreux Ladies Open, Switzerland	Clay	(Germany) Noma Noha Akugue	6–1, 6–2

== ITF Circuit finals ==
=== Singles: 15 (7 titles, 8 runner-ups) ===
Legend $80,000 tournaments (1–0) $60/75,000 tournaments (1–3) $40/50,000 tournaments (1–0) $25,000 tournaments (3–4) $15,000 tournaments (1–1)	Finals by surface Hard (2–1) Clay (5–7)

Result	W–L	Date	Tournament	Tier	Surface	Opponent	Score
Loss	0–1	Jul 2014	ITF Denain, France	25,000	Clay	(Romania) Andreea Mitu	6–4, 2–6, 1–6
Loss	0–2	Jul 2015	ITF Aschaffenburg, Germany	25,000	Clay	(Croatia) Tena Lukas	5–7, 4–6
Loss	0–3	Jul 2016	ITF Darmstadt, Germany	25,000	Clay	(Germany) Tamara Korpatsch	2–6, 2–6
Loss	0–4	Nov 2017	ITF Hammamet, Tunisia	15,000	Clay	(Russia) Varvara Gracheva	4–6, 6–7^{(1)}
Win	1–4	Feb 2018	Open de l'Isère, France	25,000	Hard (i)	(Luxembourg) Eléonora Molinaro	6–4, 6–7^{(5)}, 7–6^{(3)}
Loss	1–5	Feb 2018	ITF Curitiba, Brazil	25,000	Clay	(Slovenia) Tamara Zidanšek	5–7, 4–6
Win	2–5	Jun 2018	ITF Padua, Italy	25,000	Clay	(Russia) Liudmila Samsonova	7–5, 6–3
Win	3–5	Jun 2018	Open de Montpellier, France	25,000	Clay	(Argentina) Catalina Pella	6–4, 6–3
Win	4–5	Jul 2018	ITS Cup Olomouc, Czech Republic	W80+H	Clay	(Czech Republic) Karolína Muchová	6–4, 6–4
Win	5–5	Feb 2023	ITF Monastir, Tunisia	W15	Hard	(Italy) Cristiana Ferrando	6–4, 6–3
Loss	5–6	Apr 2023	Bellinzona Ladies Open, Switzerland	W60	Clay	Mirra Andreeva	6–2, 1–6, 4–6
Win	6–6	Jun 2023	Open de Biarritz, France	W60	Clay	(Turkey) İpek Öz	7–5, 6–3
Loss	6–7	Jan 2026	ITF Manama, Bahrain	W75	Hard	Alina Korneeva	4–6, 0–6
Loss	6–8	Jul 2026	Ladies Open Hechingen, Germany	W75	Clay	(Czech Republic) Barbora Palicová	7–5, 5–7, 4–6
Win	7–8	Aug 2026	ITF Saint-Palais-sur-Mer, France	W50	Clay	(France) Clara Burel	2–6, 6–3, 7–5

=== Doubles: 1 (title) ===
Legend W80 tournaments	Finals by surface Hard (1–0)

Result	Date	Tournament	Tier	Surface	Partner	Opponents	Score
Win	Sep 2023	ITF Le Neubourg, France	W80	Hard	Alina Korneeva	(Ukraine) Maryna Kolb (Ukraine) Nadiia Kolb	7–6^{(7)}, 7–5
