= Eduard Kudermetov =

Soviet and Russian ice hockey player

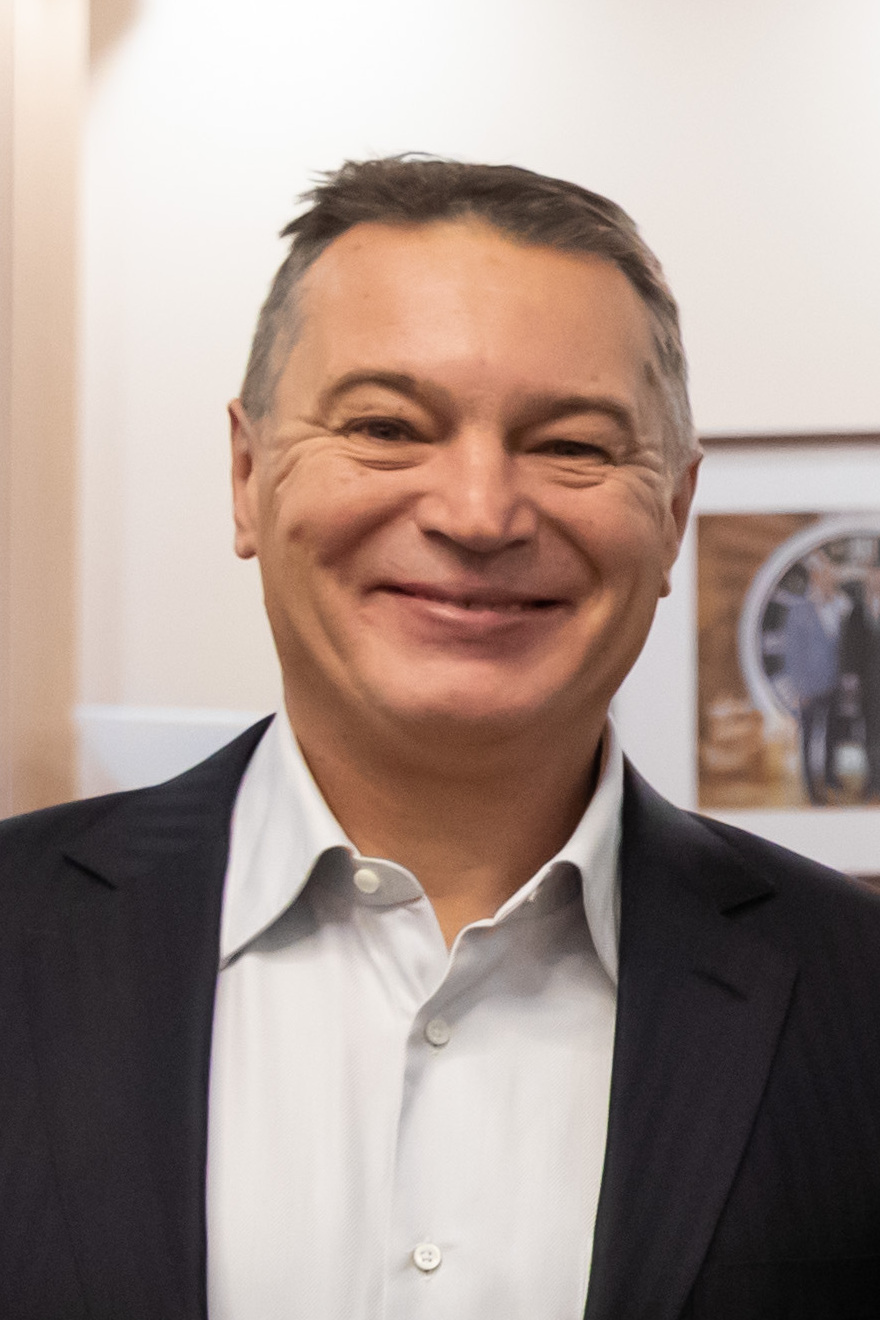
- Kudermetov in 2022
- Born: March 7, 1972 (age 53) Kazan, Russian SFSR, Soviet Union
- Height: 5 ft 10 in (178 cm)
- Weight: 181 lb (82 kg; 12 st 13 lb)
- Position: Right wing
- Shot: Left
- Played for: Sokil Kyiv; Itil Kazan; Ak Bars Kazan; Metallurg Magnitogorsk; HC CSKA Moscow; HC Spartak Moscow
- Playing career: 1990–2008

Eduard Damirovich Kudermetov (Russian: Эдуард Дамирович Кудерметов; born 3 March 1972) is a Soviet and Russian former professional ice hockey forward. He is a two-time Russian Champion.

== Awards and honors ==
Award	Year
RSL
Winner (Ak Bars Kazan)	1998
Winner (Metallurg Magnitogorsk)	2007

== Personal life ==
His daughters Veronika and Polina are professional tennis players.
