= 2023 Al Habtoor Tennis Challenge =

Tennis tournament

- Date: 4–10 December 2023
- Edition: 26th
- Category: ITF Women's World Tennis Tour
- Prize money: $100,000
- Surface: Hard
- Location: Dubai, United Arab Emirates

Champions

Singles
- Anastasia Tikhonova

Doubles
- (Hungary) Tímea Babos / Vera Zvonareva
- Al Habtoor Tennis Challenge

The 2023 Al Habtoor Tennis Challenge is a professional tennis tournament played on outdoor hard courts. It is the twenty-sixth edition of the tournament which is part of the 2023 ITF Women's World Tennis Tour. It took place in Dubai, United Arab Emirates between 4 and 10 December 2023.

== Champions ==
=== Singles ===
- Anastasia Tikhonova def. (Netherlands) Arianne Hartono, 6–1, 6–4

=== Doubles ===
- (Hungary) Tímea Babos / Vera Zvonareva def. (United Kingdom) Olivia Nicholls / (United Kingdom) Heather Watson, 6–1, 2–6, [10–7]

== Singles main draw entrants ==
=== Seeds ===
Country	Player	Rank^{1}	Seed
SVK	Viktória Hrunčáková	116	1
UKR	Daria Snigur	123	2
SVK	Rebecca Šramková	126	3
AUS	Arina Rodionova	132	4
	Maria Timofeeva	133	5
CZE	Tereza Martincová	150	6
GBR	Heather Watson	166	7
	Ekaterina Makarova	168	8

- ^{1} Rankings are as of 27 November 2023.

=== Other entrants ===
The following players received wildcards into the singles main draw:

- (Romania) Cristina Dinu
- (Germany) Sabine Lisicki
- (France) Kristina Mladenovic
- Vera Zvonareva

The following players received entry from the qualifying draw:

- (United Kingdom) Emily Appleton
- (Switzerland) Leonie Küng
- (Thailand) Peangtarn Plipuech
- (Serbia) Lola Radivojević
- (Bulgaria) Isabella Shinikova
- (Ukraine) Kateryna Volodko
- Ekaterina Yashina
- Ksenia Zaytseva
