= Oeiras CETO Open =

Oeiras Open CETO

WTA 125K series
- Event name: Oeiras Open CETO (2025–); Oeiras Open (2024), Magnesium K Active Ladies Open (2016–22)
- Location: Oeiras, Portugal
- Venue: Clube Escola de Ténis de Oeiras (CETO)
- Category: WTA 125 (2026-); ITF Women's World Tennis Tour (2016-2025)
- Surface: Clay
- Draw: 32S/16Q/16D
- Prize money: €100,000

Current champions (2026)
- Singles: (France) Fiona Ferro
- Doubles: (Belgium) Sofia Costoulas (Portugal) Matilde Jorge

The Oeiras Open CETO is a tournament for professional tennis players, held in Oeiras, Portugal and played on outdoor clay courts. Since 2026 it is a WTA 125 Challenger. It was an ITF Women's World Tennis Tour event from 2016 until 2025.

== Past finals ==
=== Singles ===
Year	Champion	Runner-up	Score
2026	(France) Fiona Ferro	(Uzbekistan) Polina Kudermetova	6–3, 0–6, 6–1
⬆️ WTA $125,000 event ⬆️
2025	(China) Yuan Yue	(Belgium) Greet Minnen	4–6, 6–4, 6–2
2024	(Croatia) Jana Fett	(Hungary) Panna Udvardy	6–0, 6–2
2023	(Uzbekistan) Nigina Abduraimova	(Portugal) Francisca Jorge	1–6, 6–4, 6–3
2022	Diana Shnaider	(Italy) Martina Di Giuseppe	6–4, 6–2
2021 (2)	(Spain) María Gutiérrez Carrasco	(Russia) Marina Melnikova	6–3, 6–2
2021 (1)	(Ukraine) Anhelina Kalinina	(South Korea) Jang Su-jeong	6–4, 4–6, 6–4
2020	(Denmark) Clara Tauson	(Spain) María Gutiérrez Carrasco	6–3, 6–2
2019	Not held		
2018	(Switzerland) Ylena In-Albon	(Belgium) Tamaryn Hendler	7–5, ret.
2017	(Hungary) Panna Udvardy	(Italy) Gaia Sanesi	6–7^{(5–7)}, 7–5, 6–4
2016	(Italy) Angelica Moratelli	(Argentina) Victoria Bosio	6–4, 6–2

=== Doubles ===
Year	Champions	Runners-up	Score
2026	(Belgium) Sofia Costoulas (Portugal) Matilde Jorge (3)	(Belgium) Magali Kempen (Belgium) Lara Salden	6–4, 6–2
⬆️ WTA $125,000 event ⬆️
2025	(Portugal) Francisca Jorge (2) (Portugal) Matilde Jorge (2)	(Serbia) Aleksandra Krunić (United States) Sabrina Santamaria	6–7^{(7–9)}, 6–1, [1–0] ret.
2024	(Portugal) Francisca Jorge (Portugal) Matilde Jorge	Yana Sizikova (Chinese Taipei) Wu Fang-hsien	6–2, 6–0
2023	(Mexico) Fernanda Contreras (Brazil) Ingrid Gamarra Martins	(Czech Republic) Jesika Malečková (Czech Republic) Renata Voráčová	6–3, 6–2
2022	(Spain) Jéssica Bouzas Maneiro (Spain) Guiomar Maristany	(Portugal) Francisca Jorge (Portugal) Matilde Jorge	3–6, 6–4, [10–8]
2021 (2)	(Hungary) Adrienn Nagy (South Korea) Park So-hyun	(India) Riya Bhatia (Brazil) Gabriela Cé	6–4, 6–0
2021 (1)	(Netherlands) Suzan Lamens (Russia) Marina Melnikova	(Russia) Natela Dzalamidze (Russia) Sofya Lansere	6–3, 6–1
2020	(Spain) Eva Guerrero Álvarez (France) Diane Parry	(Portugal) Francisca Jorge (Spain) Olga Parres Azcoitia	7–6^{(7–1)}, 6–0
2019	Not held		
2018	(Germany) Anna Klasen (Germany) Romy Kölzer	(Spain) Alba Carrillo Marín (Portugal) Cláudia Cianci	6–3, 6–3
2017	(Italy) Gaia Sanesi (Italy) Martina Spigarelli	(United Kingdom) Sarah Beth Grey (United Kingdom) Olivia Nicholls	6–0, 6–2
2016	(Cambodia) Andrea Ka (France) Laëtitia Sarrazin	(Brazil) Carolina Alves (Argentina) Victoria Bosio	4–6, 7–5, [10–3]
