= Polina Kudermetova =

Russian-Uzbek tennis player (born 2003)

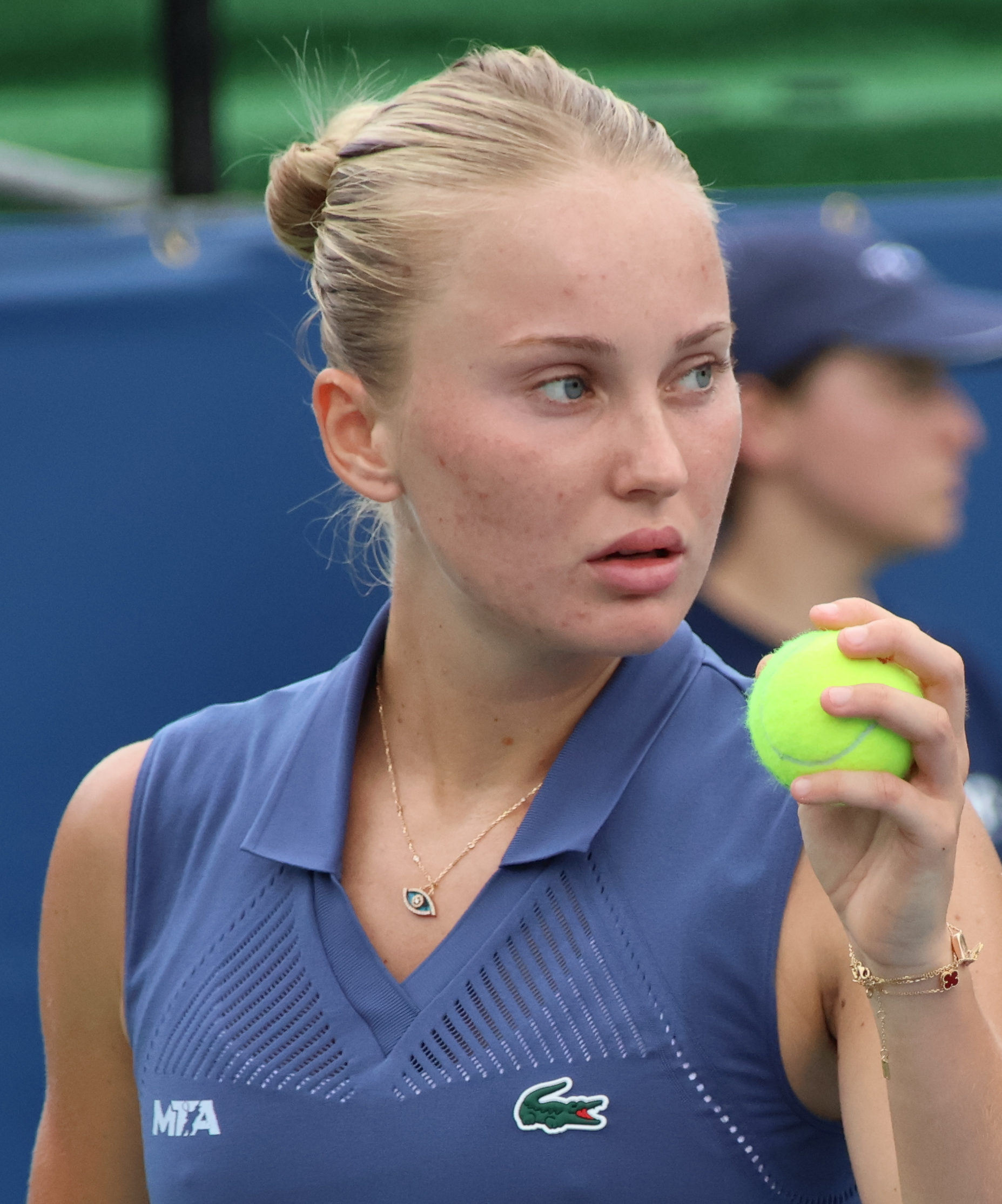
- Polina Kudermetova at the 2025 Washington Open
- Native name: Полина Кудерметова
- Country (sports): Uzbekistan (Dec 2025–); Russia (2019–2025)
- Residence: Moscow, Russia
- Born: 4 June 2003 (age 23) Moscow, Russia
- Height: 1.72 m (5 ft 8 in)
- Plays: Right-handed
- Coach: Ravshan Sultanov
- Prize money: $1,846,005

Singles
- Career record: 240–152
- Career titles: 9 ITF
- Highest ranking: No. 54 (14 April 2025)
- Current ranking: No. 93 (2 November 2026)

Grand Slam singles results
- Australian Open: 2R (2026)
- French Open: 1R (2025)
- Wimbledon: 1R (2025, 2026)
- US Open: 2R (2025)

Doubles
- Career record: 53–42
- Career titles: 1
- Highest ranking: No. 203 (15 September 2025)
- Current ranking: No. 213 (2 November 2026)

Grand Slam doubles results
- French Open: 1R (2025)
- Wimbledon: 2R (2025)
- Last updated on: 2 November 2026.

Polina Eduardovna Kudermetova (Russian: Полина Эдуардовна Кудерметова, Polina Eduardovna Kudermetova, born 4 June 2003) is a Russian-born Uzbekistani professional tennis player. She has been ranked by the WTA as high as No. 54 in singles, achieved on 14 April 2025, and No. 203 in doubles, reached on 15 September 2025. Kudermetova has won one WTA Tour title in doubles at the 2026 Guangzhou Open.

== Career ==
=== 2023: Major debut, first WTA Tour win ===
At the Australian Open, Kudermetova advanced to her first Grand Slam tournament main draw on her qualifying debut by defeating Anastasia Gasanova, Katie Boulter, and Asia Muhammad. She lost to wildcard player Olivia Gadecki in the first round.

She recorded her first main-draw win at the Rosmalen Open over Yuan Yue, but lost her next match to Liudmila Samsonova.

At the Korea Open, she reached the quarterfinals defeating sixth seed Alycia Parks and Kathinka von Deichmann, before losing to Yanina Wickmayer.

=== 2024: First WTA Tour semifinal ===
At the newly upgraded Korea Open, ranked No. 163, Kudermetova made her debut at the WTA 500-level as a lucky loser and defeated qualifier Priscilla Hon in the first round, and seventh seed Ekaterina Alexandrova to reach the quarterfinals where she lost to third seed Beatriz Haddad Maia. As a result she reached a new career-high ranking in the top 130 on 23 September 2024.

Partnering with Alina Korneeva, she ended runner-up in doubles at the WTA 125 Abierto Tampico, losing to Carmen Corley and Rebecca Marino in the final.

Kudermetova reached her first WTA Tour singles semifinal at the Mérida Open with wins over second seed Nadia Podoroska, Varvara Lepchenko and Nina Stojanović, before losing in the last four to Ann Li.

As the top seed, Kudermetova was runner-up at the W100 Dubai Tennis Challenge, losing to wildcard entrant Jodie Burrage in the final. Despite the defeat, she reached a career-high WTA singles ranking of No. 106 the day after the tournament finished on 9 December 2024.

=== 2025: First career final, top-60 debut ===
Having made it through qualifying, Kudermetova reached her first tour final at the Brisbane International, defeating Wang Xinyu, 13th seed Liudmila Samsonova, third seed Daria Kasatkina (her first win against a top-10 ranked player), Ashlyn Krueger and Anhelina Kalinina. She lost the championship match to world No. 1, Aryna Sabalenka, in three sets, and made her top-60 debut on 6 January 2025, climbing 50 positions up in the rankings to No. 57.

Kudermetova defeated Elena Micic in the final qualifying round at the Australian Open to make it into her second Grand Slam tournament main-draw. She lost to 23rd seed Magdalena Fręch in the first round.

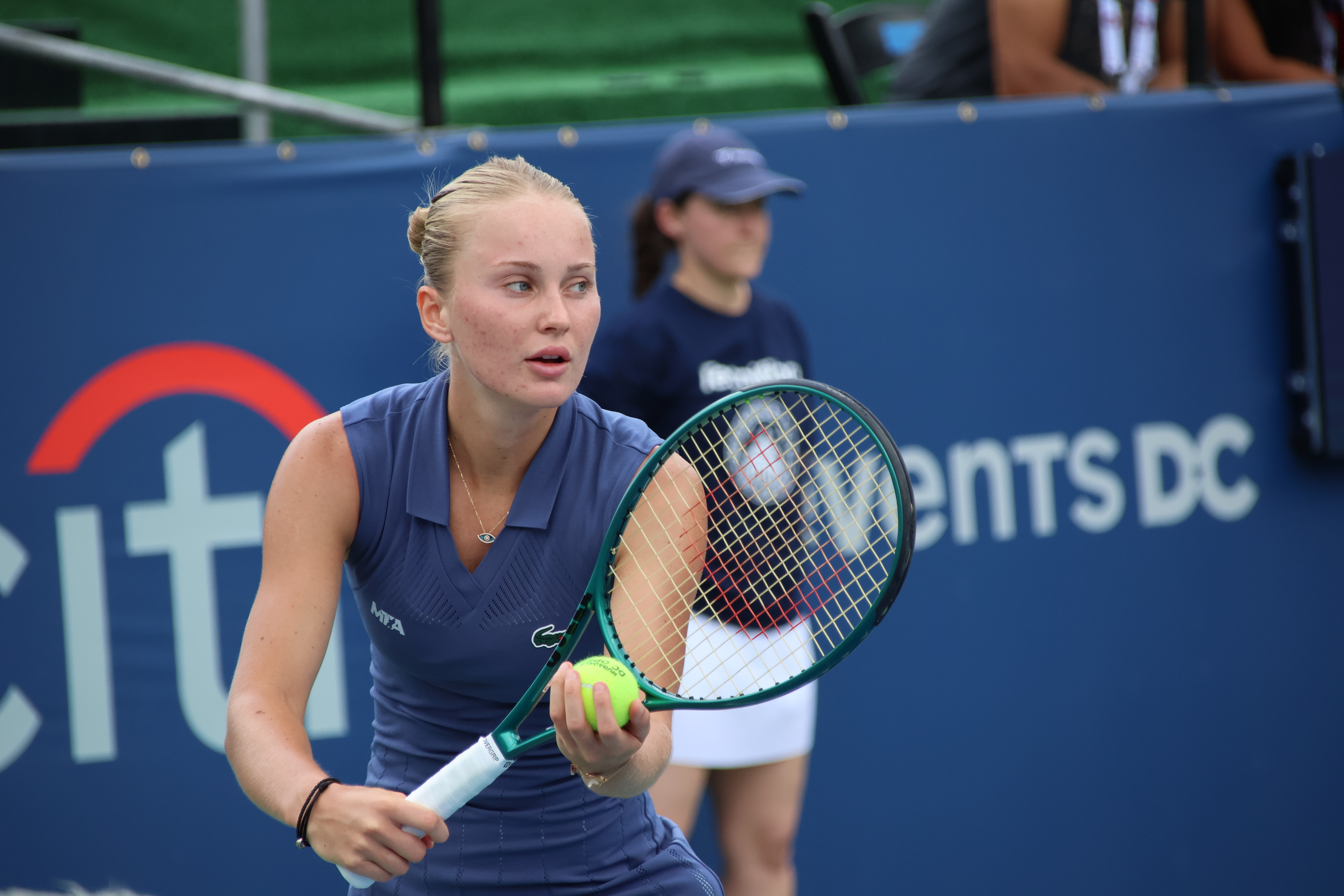
Kudermetova at the 2025 DC Open

In March at the WTA 1000 Indian Wells Open, she recorded wins over qualifier Claire Liu and 20th seed Ekaterina Alexandrova to reach the third round, at which point she was eliminated by lucky loser Sonay Kartal.

At the US Open, Kudermetova's opening opponent, Nuria Párrizas Díaz, retired with an ankle injury after just four games, handing her a place in the second round of a major for the first time, where she lost to world No. 1, Aryna Sabalenka, in straight sets.

=== 2026: Maiden career title in doubles ===
Kudermetova started her 2026 season by reaching her first WTA 125 singles final at the Canberra Tennis International, losing to Joanna Garland. At the Australian Open, she defeated Guiomar Maristany for her first win at this major, before losing to 14th seed Clara Tauson in the second round. In April, as a qualifier, Kudermetova made it through to her second WTA 125 singles final at the Oeiras CETO Open, but again had to settle for being runner-up after a three set defeat against Fiona Ferro.

At the WTA 1000 China Open in October, she defeated lucky loser Yexin Ma and 32nd seed Clara Tauson to reach the third round, where her run was ended by fourth seed Mirra Andreeva. Two weeks later, Kudermetova qualified for the Ningbo Open and overcame wildcard entrant Cristina Bucșa, before retiring due to injury in the first set of her second-round match against world No. 1, Elena Rybakina. Teaming with Maria Timofeeva, she won her maiden WTA Tour title in doubles at the Guangzhou Open, defeating Taiwanese sisters Cho I-hsuan and Cho Yi-tsen in the final. Seeded sixth at the Chennai Open the following week, Kudermetova recorded wins over lucky loser Viktória Morvayová and Oksana Selekhmeteva to reach her first WTA Tour singles quarterfinal for 22 months. In the last eight she lost to top seed and defending champion Janice Tjen in three sets.

== National representation ==
On 15 December 2025, it was announced that Kudermetova has changed her sporting nationality, following Kamilla Rakhimova and Maria Timofeeva, and will compete for Uzbekistan starting in 2026.Ranked at world No. 104, she became the Uzbekistani No. 2 WTA player behind Rakhimova.

== Personal life ==
She is the younger sister of professional tennis and former top-ten player, Veronika Kudermetova, and daughter of Russian national ice hockey champion Eduard Kudermetov. Her brother-in-law is Sergei Demekhine.

== Performance timeline ==
Key
W	F	SF	QF	#R	RR	Q#	DNQ	A	NH

(W) winner; (F) finalist; (SF) semifinalist; (QF) quarterfinalist; (#R) rounds 4, 3, 2, 1; (RR) round-robin stage; (Q#) qualification round; (DNQ) did not qualify; (A) absent; (NH) not held; (SR) strike rate (events won / competed); (W–L) win–loss record.
To avoid confusion and double counting, these charts are updated at the conclusion of a tournament or when the player's participation has ended.

Only main-draw results in WTA Tour, Grand Slam tournaments, Billie Jean King Cup (Fed Cup), United Cup, Hopman Cup and Olympic Games are included in win–loss records.

=== Singles ===
Current through the 2026 Wuhan Open.

Tournament	2023	2024	2025	2026	SR	W–L	Win %
Grand Slam tournaments
Australian Open	1R	A	1R	2R	0 / 3	1–3	
French Open	Q1	Q1	1R	Q3	0 / 1	0–1	
Wimbledon	A	Q1	1R	1R	0 / 2	0–2	
US Open	A	Q1	2R	Q1	0 / 1	1–1	
Win–loss	0–1	0–0	1–4	1–2	0 / 7	2–7	
WTA 1000 tournaments
Qatar Open	NTI	A	1R	A	0 / 1	0–1	
Dubai Championships	A	A	Q1	A	0 / 0	0–0	
Indian Wells Open	A	A	3R	A	0 / 1	2–1	
Miami Open	A	A	1R	A	0 / 1	0–1	
Madrid Open	A	A	1R	A	0 / 1	0–1	
Italian Open	Q2	A	1R	A	0 / 1	0–1	
Canadian Open	A	A	1R	1R	0 / 2	0–2	
Cincinnati Open	A	A	1R	Q2	0 / 1	0–1	
China Open	A	A	2R	3R	0 / 2	3–2	
Wuhan Open	NH	A	1R	Q1	0 / 1	0–1	
Guadalajara Open	Q1	NTI			0 / 0	0–0	
Career statistics
	2023	2024	2025	2026	SR	W–L	Win %
Tournaments	6	3	21		Career total: 30		
Titles	0	0	0	0	Career total: 0		
Finals	0	0	1	0	Career total: 1		
Hard win–loss	2–2	5–2	9–15	3–3	0 / 22	19–22	
Clay win–loss	0–2	0–1	2–4	0–0	0 / 7	2–7	
Grass win–loss	1–2	0–0	0–2	0–1	0 / 5	1–5	
Overall win–loss	3–6	5–3	11–21	3–5	0 / 35	22–35	
Year-end ranking	157	117	90				

== WTA Tour finals ==
=== Singles: 1 (runner-up) ===
Legend WTA 500 (0–1)	Finals by surface Hard (0–1)	Finals by setting Outdoor (0–1)

Result	Date	Tournament	Tier	Surface	Opponent	Score
Loss	Jan 2025	Brisbane International, Australia	WTA 500	Hard	Aryna Sabalenka	6–4, 3–6, 2–6

=== Doubles: 1 (title) ===
Legend WTA 250 (1–0)	Finals by surface Hard (1–0)	Finals by setting Outdoor (1–0)

Result	Date	Tournament	Tier	Surface	Partner	Opponents	Score
Win	Nov 2026	Guangzhou Open, China	WTA 250	Hard	(Uzbekistan) Maria Timofeeva	(Chinese Taipei) Cho I-hsuan (Chinese Taipei) Cho Yi-tsen	7–5, 7–6^{(7–1)}

== WTA 125 finals ==
=== Singles: 2 (2 runner-ups) ===
Result	W–L	Date	Tournament	Surface	Opponent	Score
Loss	0–1	Jan 2026	Canberra International, Australia	Hard	(Chinese Taipei) Joanna Garland	4–6, 2–6
Loss	0–2	Apr 2026	Oeiras CETO Open, Portugal	Clay	(France) Fiona Ferro	3–6, 6–0, 1–6

=== Doubles: 1 (runner-up) ===
Result	Date	Tournament	Surface	Partner	Opponents	Score
Loss	Oct 2024	Abierto Tampico, Mexico	Hard	Alina Korneeva	(United States) Carmen Corley (Canada) Rebecca Marino	3–6, 3–6

== ITF Circuit finals ==
=== Singles: 12 (9 titles, 3 runner-ups) ===
Legend W100 tournaments (0–1) W60 tournaments (0–1) W40/50 tournaments (2–1) W25 tournaments (3–0) W15 tournaments (4–0) (Note: The final was abandoned due to poor weather. Both players split ranking points and prize money.)	Finals by surface Hard (8–1) Clay (1–2)

Result	W–L	Date	Location	Tier	Surface	Opponents	Score
Win	1–0	Dec 2019	ITF Antalya, Turkey	W15	Hard	(Romania) Georgia Crăciun	6–4, 3–6, 6–3
Finalist	–	Dec 2020	ITF Antalya, Turkiye	W15	Clay	(Romania) Andreea Roșca	cancelled
Win	2–0	Feb 2021	ITF Antalya, Turkiye	W15	Clay	(Spain) Marta Custic	6–2, 1–6, 6–3
Win	3–0	Nov 2021	Kazan Open, Russia	W15	Hard (i)	(Uzbekistan) Nigina Abduraimova	7–5, 3–6, 6–4
Win	4–0	Jan 2022	Tatarstan Winter Cup, Russia	W15	Hard (i)	(Russia) Anastasia Kovaleva	6–0, 6–4
Win	5–0	Jun 2022	ITF Ra'anana, Israel	W25	Hard	Maria Timofeeva	4–6, 6–4, 7–5
Loss	5–1	Aug 2022	ITF San Bartolomé de Tirajana, Spain	W60	Clay	(Netherlands) Arantxa Rus	3–6, 6–3, 1–6
Win	6–1	Oct 2022	ITF Istanbul, Turkiye	W25	Hard (i)	Tatiana Prozorova	6–3, 6–1
Win	7–1	Nov 2022	ITF Jerusalem, Israel	W25	Hard	Ekaterina Reyngold	6–1, 6–1
Win	8–1	Mar 2023	ITF Astana, Kazakhstan	W40	Hard (i)	Darya Astakhova	6–2, 6–3
Win	9–1	Feb 2024	ITF Indore, India	W50	Hard	(Slovenia) Dalila Jakupović	3–6, 6–2, 6–0
Loss	9–2	Aug 2024	ITF Oldenzaal, Netherlands	W50	Clay	(Belgium) Hanne Vandewinkel	6–4, 2–6, 6–7
Loss	9–3	Dec 2024	Dubai Tennis Challenge, UAE	W100	Hard	(United Kingdom) Jodie Burrage	3–6, 3–6

=== Doubles: 5 (2 titles, 3 runner-ups) ===
Legend W60 tournaments (1–0) W50 tournaments (1–0) W25 tournaments (0–3)	Finals by surface Hard (1–3) Clay (1–0)

Result	W–L	Date	Tournament	Tier	Surface	Partnering	Opponents	Score
Loss	0–1	Apr 2022	ITF Monastir, Tunisia	W25	Hard	Sofya Lansere	(France) Estelle Cascino (France) Jessika Ponchet	0–6, 6–4, [7–10]
Loss	0–2	Jun 2022	ITF Tbilisi, Georgia	W25	Hard	Sofya Lansere	Angelina Gabueva; Anastasia Zakharova	4–6, 3–6
Loss	0–3	Nov 2022	ITF Jerusalem, Israel	W25	Hard	Ekaterina Reyngold	(Chinese Taipei) Lee Pei-chi (Georgia (country)) Sofia Shapatava	2–6, 4–6
Win	1–3	Mar 2023	Nur-Sultan Challenger, Kazakhstan	W60	Hard (i)	Anastasia Tikhonova	(South Korea) Jang Su-jeong (South Korea) Han Na-lae	2–6, 6–3, [10–7]
Win	2–3	Aug 2024	ITF Oldenzaal, Netherlands	W50	Clay	Ekaterina Makarova	(United Kingdom) Freya Christie (Colombia) Yuliana Lizarazo	6–4, 1–6, [10–7]

== Wins against top 10 players ==
- Kudermetova's match record against players who were, at the time the match was played, ranked in the top 10.

No.	Opponent	Rk	Event	Surface	Rd	Score	Rk	Years	Ref
1	Daria Kasatkina	9	Brisbane International, Australia	Hard	3R	1–6, 6–2, 7–5	107	2025	

- Key: (Rk) first use, opponent rank; (Rd) round; (Rk) 2nd use, player rank; (Ref) reference; (F) final; (SF) semifinal; (QF) quarterfinal; (#R) rounds 4, 3, 2, 1; (RR) round-robin stage; (Q#) qualifying rounds or stages (3), 2, 1.
