= 2022 Jasmin Open =

- Date: 3–9 October
- Edition: 1st
- Category: WTA 250
- Draw: 32S / 24Q / 16D
- Prize money: $251,750
- Surface: Hard (Outdoor)
- Location: Monastir, Tunisia
- Venue: Skanes Family Hotel

Champions

Singles
- (Belgium) Elise Mertens

Doubles
- (France) Kristina Mladenovic / (Czech Republic) Kateřina Siniaková
- Jasmin Open

The 2022 Jasmin Open was a WTA Tour tournament organised for female tennis players on outdoor hardcourts. The event took place at the Skanes Family Hotel in Monastir, Tunisia, from 3 through 9 October 2022.

The $251,750 subsidized tournament belonged to the WTA 250 tournament. The world No. 2, Ons Jabeur from Tunisia, became the highest seeded singles player. As the last direct participant in the singles game, the 90th ranked player Kamilla Rakhimova entered.

The Jasmin Open Monastir was added to the 40th week of the season in May 2022, however, it was one of the six tournaments that were given single-year WTA 250 licenses in September and October 2022 due to the cancellation of tournaments in China due to Peng Shuai sexual assault and disappearance controversy, who in November 2021 accused former Vice Premier Zhang Gaoli of sexual violence, and as well as the COVID-19 pandemic. As a result of Russian invasion of Ukraine at the end of February 2022, the ATP, WTA and ITF tennis governing bodies of the Grand Slam tournaments decided that Russian and Belarusian tennis players could continue to compete on the circuits, but not under the flags of Russia and Belarus until further notice.

Belgian Elise Mertens won her seventh singles title on the WTA Tour. The doubles was dominated by the Czech Kateřina Siniaková and the French Kristina Mladenovic, who fulfilled the role of favorites and turned their first joint participation in doubles competitions into a trophy.

== Champions ==
=== Singles ===
- (Belgium) Elise Mertens def. (France) Alizé Cornet, 6–2, 6–0

This is Mertens' first title of the year and seventh of her career.

=== Doubles ===
- (France) Kristina Mladenovic / (Czech Republic) Kateřina Siniaková def. (Japan) Miyu Kato / (United States) Angela Kulikov, 6–2, 6–0

== Singles main draw entrants ==
=== Seeds ===
Country	Player	Rank^{1}	Seed
TUN	Ons Jabeur	2	1
	Veronika Kudermetova	13	2
FRA	Alizé Cornet	37	3
CRO	Petra Martić	43	4
BEL	Elise Mertens	44	5
	Anastasia Potapova	48	6
CZE	Kateřina Siniaková	49	7
POL	Magda Linette	55	8

- Rankings are as of September 26, 2022.

=== Other entrants ===
The following players received wildcards into the singles main draw:

- Mirra Andreeva
- (France) Alizé Cornet
- (France) Yasmine Mansouri

The following player received entry using a protected ranking into the singles main draw:

- Evgeniya Rodina

The following players received entry from the qualifying draw:

- (Spain) Marina Bassols Ribera
- (Czech Republic) Linda Fruhvirtová
- (Croatia) Ana Konjuh
- (Greece) Despina Papamichail
- (Italy) Lucrezia Stefanini
- (Japan) Moyuka Uchijima

The following player received entry as a lucky loser:

- (France) Harmony Tan

=== Withdrawals ===
Before the tournament

- (Romania) Sorana Cîrstea → replaced by Kamilla Rakhimova
- (Slovenia) Kaja Juvan → replaced by (France) Harmony Tan
- (Italy) Jasmine Paolini → replaced by (Romania) Elena-Gabriela Ruse
- (Denmark) Clara Tauson → replaced by (United Kingdom) Harriet Dart
- (Italy) Martina Trevisan → replaced by (Brazil) Laura Pigossi
- (Belgium) Alison Van Uytvanck → replaced by (Czech Republic) Kateřina Siniaková

=== Retirements ===
- (France) Chloé Paquet (back injury)
- (Italy) Lucrezia Stefanini

== Doubles main draw entrants ==
=== Seeds ===
Country	Player	Country	Player	Rank^{†}	Seed
FRA	Kristina Mladenovic	CZE	Kateřina Siniaková	20	1
JPN	Miyu Kato	USA	Angela Kulikov	125	2
USA	Kaitlyn Christian		Lidziya Marozava	129	3
SVK	Viktória Kužmová	ROU	Elena-Gabriela Ruse	190	4

- ^{1} Rankings as of September 26, 2022.

=== Other entrants ===
The following pair received a wildcard into the doubles main draw:

- (Algeria) Inès Ibbou / (France) Yasmine Mansouri

=== Withdrawals ===
Before the tournament

- (United States) Kaitlyn Christian / (China) Han Xinyun → replaced by (United States) Kaitlyn Christian / Lidziya Marozava
- (Georgia (country)) Oksana Kalashnikova / (Poland) Katarzyna Piter → replaced by (United Kingdom) Emily Appleton / (United States) Quinn Gleason
- Lidziya Marozava / Yana Sizikova → replaced by (Netherlands) Isabelle Haverlag / (India) Prarthana Thombare

During the tournament

- (Slovakia) Viktória Kužmová / (Romania) Elena-Gabriela Ruse
- (Greece) Despina Papamichail / (Italy) Lucrezia Stefanini
- (Brazil) Laura Pigossi / (Japan) Moyuka Uchijima
