= 2024 Jasmin Open =

- Date: 9–15 September
- Edition: 3rd
- Category: WTA 250
- Draw: 32S / 16D
- Surface: Hard (Outdoor)
- Location: Monastir, Tunisia
- Venue: Magic Hotel Skanes

Champions

Singles
- (United Kingdom) Sonay Kartal

Doubles
- Anna Blinkova / (Egypt) Mayar Sherif
← 2023 ·	Jasmin Open	· 2025 →

The 2024 Jasmin Open was a women's professional tennis tournament played on outdoor hardcourts. It was the third edition of the tournament and part of the WTA 250 tournaments on the 2024 WTA Tour. The event took place at the Magic Hotel Skanes in Monastir, Tunisia, from 9 through 15 September 2024.

== Champions ==
=== Singles ===
- (United Kingdom) Sonay Kartal def. (Slovakia) Rebecca Šramková, 6–3, 7–5

=== Doubles ===
- Anna Blinkova / (Egypt) Mayar Sherif def. Alina Korneeva / Anastasia Zakharova, 2–6, 6–1, [10–8]

== Singles main draw entrants ==
=== Seeds ===
Country	Player	Rank^{1}	Seed
BEL	Elise Mertens	35	1
FRA	Clara Burel	56	2
FRA	Diane Parry	60	3
ARG	Nadia Podoroska	68	4
ROU	Jaqueline Cristian	69	5
BEL	Greet Minnen	70	6
ITA	Lucia Bronzetti	76	7
	Anna Blinkova	81	8

- Rankings are as of 26 August 2024.

=== Other entrants ===
The following players received wildcards into the singles main draw:

- (Tunisia) Chiraz Bechri
- (France) Kristina Mladenovic
- (Indonesia) Priska Madelyn Nugroho

The following players received entry from the qualifying draw:

- (France) Elsa Jacquemot
- (United Kingdom) Sonay Kartal
- (Croatia) Antonia Ružić
- (Turkey) Zeynep Sönmez
- (Ukraine) Yuliia Starodubtseva
- ~~Maria Timofeeva~~

The following player received entry as a lucky loser:

- Aliona Falei

=== Withdrawals ===
- (Ukraine) Kateryna Baindl → replaced by (Hungary) Dalma Gálfi
- (Spain) Jéssica Bouzas Maneiro → replaced by (United States) Alycia Parks
- (United Kingdom) Harriet Dart → replaced by (Spain) Marina Bassols Ribera
- (Italy) Sara Errani → replaced by Anastasia Zakharova
- (Czech Republic) Karolína Muchová → replaced by (United States) Ann Li
- Maria Timofeeva → replaced by Aliona Falei

== Doubles main draw entrants ==
=== Seeds ===
Country	Player	Country	Player	Rank^{†}	Seed
ITA	Camilla Rosatello	BEL	Kimberley Zimmermann	179	1
USA	Quinn Gleason	BRA	Ingrid Martins	188	2
USA	Sophie Chang	USA	Alycia Parks	192	3
GBR	Emily Appleton	POL	Martyna Kubka	246	4

- ^{1} Rankings as of 26 August 2024.

=== Other entrants ===
The following pair received a wildcard into the doubles main draw:

- (Algeria) Inès Ibbou / (Switzerland) Naïma Karamoko
