= 2024 Jasmin Open – Singles =

Singles
- 2024 Jasmin Open

Final
- Champion: (United Kingdom) Sonay Kartal
- Runner-up: (Slovakia) Rebecca Šramková
- Score: 6–3, 7–5

Details
- Draw: 32 (4 WC, 6Q)
- Seeds: 8

Events
Singles	Doubles
← 2023 ·	Jasmin Open	· 2025 →

Sonay Kartal defeated Rebecca Šramková in the final, 6–3, 7–5 to win the singles tennis title at the 2024 Jasmin Open. It was her first WTA Tour title, and she lost only one set en route, in the first round against Jaqueline Cristian.

Elise Mertens was the two-time defending champion, but lost in the second round to Eva Lys.

== Seeds ==
1. (Belgium) Elise Mertens (second round)
2. (France) Clara Burel (second round)
3. (France) Diane Parry (second round)
4. (Argentina) Nadia Podoroska (first round)
5. (Romania) Jaqueline Cristian (first round)
6. (Belgium) Greet Minnen (second round)
7. (Italy) Lucia Bronzetti (semifinals)
8. Anna Blinkova (first round)

== Draw ==
=== Key ===
- Q = Qualifier
- WC = Wild card
- LL = Lucky loser
- Alt = Alternate
- ITF = ITF entry
- PR = Protected ranking
- SR = Special ranking
- SE = Special exempt
- JE = Junior exempt
- JR = Junior Accelerator Programme entrant
- CO = College Accelerator Programme entrant
- NG = Next Gen Accelerator Program entrant
- w/o = Walkover
- r = Retired
- d = Defaulted

=== Finals ===
Semifinals
(Germany) Eva Lys	1^{r}
Q	(United Kingdom) Sonay Kartal	5
7	(Italy) Lucia Bronzetti	3	4
(Slovakia) Rebecca Šramková	6	6

Final
Q	(United Kingdom) Sonay Kartal	6	7
(Slovakia) Rebecca Šramková	3	5

=== Top half ===
First round
1	(Belgium) E Mertens	6	6
A Zakharova	2	0
(Ukraine) L Tsurenko	3	5
(Germany) E Lys	6	7
(Spain) R Masarova	6	6^{4}	3
Q	(Turkey) Z Sönmez	4	7^{7}	6
LL	A Falei	0	6	2
6	(Belgium) G Minnen	6	3	6
3	(France) D Parry	6	6
WC	(Tunisia) C Bechri	3	0
Q	(Ukraine) Y Starodubtseva	6	3	6
(Netherlands) S Lamens	2	6	4
WC	(Indonesia) PM Nugroho	2	1
(Japan) M Hontama	6	6
Q	(United Kingdom) S Kartal	4	6	7
5	(Romania) J Cristian	6	3	5

Second round
1	(Belgium) E Mertens	6	2	6^{4}
(Germany) E Lys	1	6	7^{7}
Q	(Turkey) Z Sönmez	6	1	6
6	(Belgium) G Minnen	4	6	3
3	(France) D Parry	4	4
Q	(Ukraine) Y Starodubtseva	6	6
(Japan) M Hontama	2	2
Q	(United Kingdom) S Kartal	6	6

Quarterfinals
(Germany) E Lys	7	6
Q	(Turkey) Z Sönmez	5	3
Q	(Ukraine) Y Starodubtseva	6^{4}	2
Q	(United Kingdom) S Kartal	7^{7}	6

Semifinals
(Germany) E Lys	1^{r}
Q	(United Kingdom) S Kartal	5

=== Bottom half ===
First round
7	(Italy) L Bronzetti	6	6
(Hungary) D Gálfi	2	1
(United States) A Li	6	6
WC	(France) K Mladenovic	2	1
(United States) A Parks	3	7	3
(United Kingdom) L Miyazaki	6	5	6
Q	(Croatia) A Ružić	1	6	6
4	(Argentina) N Podoroska	6	2	4
8	A Blinkova	4	4
(Spain) S Sorribes Tormo	6	6
(Egypt) M Sherif	6	3	4
(Croatia) J Fett	1	6	6
(Slovakia) R Šramková	2	7	6
Q	(France) E Jacquemot	6	5	3
(Spain) M Bassols Ribera	2	2
2	(France) C Burel	6	6

Second round
7	(Italy) L Bronzetti	6	7^{7}
(United States) A Li	4	6^{3}
(United Kingdom) L Miyazaki	3	1
Q	(Croatia) A Ružić	6	6
(Spain) S Sorribes Tormo	5	6	6
(Croatia) J Fett	7	3	4
(Slovakia) R Šramková	7^{7}	7
2	(France) C Burel	6^{4}	5

Quarterfinals
7	(Italy) L Bronzetti	6	6
Q	(Croatia) A Ružić	2	1
(Spain) S Sorribes Tormo	6	6^{5}	5
(Slovakia) R Šramková	1	7^{7}	7

Semifinals
7	(Italy) L Bronzetti	3	4
(Slovakia) R Šramková	6	6

== Qualifying ==
=== Seeds ===
1. (France) Elsa Jacquemot (qualified)
2. (Ukraine) Yuliia Starodubtseva (qualified)
3. (Turkey) Zeynep Sönmez (qualified)
4. Maria Timofeeva (qualified, withdrew from main draw)
5. (United Kingdom) Sonay Kartal (qualified)
6. (Croatia) Antonia Ružić (qualified)
7. Oksana Selekhmeteva (first round)
8. Elena Pridankina (qualifying competition)
9. Aliona Falei (qualifying competition, lucky loser)
10. (United Kingdom) Jodie Burrage (qualifying competition)
11. Alina Korneeva (qualifying competition)
12. (Georgia (country)) Mariam Bolkvadze (qualifying competition, retired)

=== Qualifiers ===
1. (France) Elsa Jacquemot
2. (Ukraine) Yuliia Starodubtseva
3. (Turkey) Zeynep Sönmez
4. ~~Maria Timofeeva~~
5. (United Kingdom) Sonay Kartal
6. (Croatia) Antonia Ružić

=== Lucky loser ===
1. Aliona Falei

=== Draw ===
==== First qualifier ====
First round
1	(France) Elsa Jacquemot	6	6
WC	(Tunisia) Chahd Tourkhani	2	1
(United States) Sophie Chang	3	6	6
7	Oksana Selekhmeteva	6	1	3

Qualifying competition
1	(France) Elsa Jacquemot	6	6
(United States) Sophie Chang	1	2

==== Second qualifier ====
First round
2	(Ukraine) Yuliia Starodubtseva	5	6	6
(France) Amandine Hesse	7	4	3
Marina Melnikova	2	3
9	Aliona Falei	6	6

Qualifying competition
2	(Ukraine) Yuliia Starodubtseva	6	2	6
9	Aliona Falei	4	6	3

==== Third qualifier ====
First round
3	(Turkey) Zeynep Sönmez	7^{7}	6
(Belgium) Magali Kempen	6^{2}	3
WC	(Tunisia) Nour Sahnoun	0	0
8	Elena Pridankina	6	6

Qualifying competition
3	(Turkey) Zeynep Sönmez	7^{8}	6
8	Elena Pridankina	6^{6}	2

==== Fourth qualifier ====
First round
4	Maria Timofeeva	6	6
(Italy) Camilla Rosatello	2	4
(Poland) Martyna Kubka	4	6	2
11	Alina Korneeva	6	4	6

Qualifying competition
4	Maria Timofeeva	6	7
11	Alina Korneeva	2	5

==== Fifth qualifier ====
First round
5	(United Kingdom) Sonay Kartal	6	6
WC	(Tunisia) Ranim Rassil	2	4
(Turkey) Ayla Aksu	4	5
12	(Georgia (country)) Mariam Bolkvadze	6	7

Qualifying competition
5	(United Kingdom) Sonay Kartal	6	0
12	(Georgia (country)) Mariam Bolkvadze	0	0^{r}

==== Sixth qualifier ====
First round
6	(Croatia) Antonia Ružić	6	7
(Sweden) Jacqueline Cabaj Awad	3	5
WC	(Tunisia) Lina Soussi	2	3
10	(United Kingdom) Jodie Burrage	6	6

Qualifying competition
6	(Croatia) Antonia Ružić	6	6
10	(United Kingdom) Jodie Burrage	2	3
