= 2023 Jasmin Open – Singles =

Singles
- 2023 Jasmin Open

Final
- Champion: (Belgium) Elise Mertens
- Runner-up: (Italy) Jasmine Paolini
- Score: 6–3, 6–0

Details
- Draw: 32 (3 WC, 6Q)
- Seeds: 8

Events
Singles	Doubles
← 2022 ·	Jasmin Open	· 2024 →

Defending champion Elise Mertens defeated Jasmine Paolini in the final, 6–3, 6–0 to win the singles tennis title at the 2023 Jasmin Open.

== Seeds ==
1. (Italy) Jasmine Paolini (final)
2. (Belgium) Elise Mertens (champion)
3. (Italy) Martina Trevisan (first round)
4. (Ukraine) Lesia Tsurenko (semifinals)
5. (Slovakia) Anna Karolína Schmiedlová (first round)
6. (Italy) Lucia Bronzetti (quarterfinals)
7. (Poland) Magdalena Fręch (first round)
8. (France) Clara Burel (semifinals)

== Draw ==
=== Key ===
- Q = Qualifier
- WC = Wild card
- LL = Lucky loser
- Alt = Alternate
- SE = Special exempt
- PR = Protected ranking
- ITF = ITF entry
- JE = Junior exempt
- w/o = Walkover
- r = Retired
- d = Defaulted
- SR = Special ranking

=== Finals ===
Semifinals
1	(Italy) Jasmine Paolini	6	4	6
4	(Ukraine) Lesia Tsurenko	2	6	2
8	(France) Clara Burel	2	1
2	(Belgium) Elise Mertens	6	6

Final
1	(Italy) Jasmine Paolini	3	0
2	(Belgium) Elise Mertens	6	6

=== Top half ===
First round
1	(Italy) J Paolini	6	6
(France) A Cornet	4	2
(Spain) M Bassols Ribera	6^{7}	2
WC	(Croatia) P Marčinko	7^{9}	6
(Slovenia) T Zidanšek	2	7^{8}	3
(Italy) S Errani	6	6^{6}	6
PR	(Slovakia) K Kučová	1	1
6	(Italy) L Bronzetti	6	6
4	(Ukraine) L Tsurenko	6	6
Q	(France) C Paquet	2	3
(United States) C Liu	6	7^{7}
(United States) E Bektas	2	6^{5}
Q	(Ukraine) K Zavatska	6	6
(Spain) J Bouzas Maneiro	4	4
(Spain) N Párrizas Díaz	6	0	6
7	(Poland) M Fręch	2	6	4

Second round
1	(Italy) J Paolini	6	3	6
WC	(Croatia) P Marčinko	4	6	2
(Italy) S Errani	3	4
6	(Italy) L Bronzetti	6	6
4	(Ukraine) L Tsurenko	6	7
(United States) C Liu	1	5
Q	(Ukraine) K Zavatska	6	5	2
(Spain) N Párrizas Díaz	4	7	6

Quarterfinals
1	(Italy) J Paolini	7	7^{7}
6	(Italy) L Bronzetti	5	6^{3}
4	(Ukraine) L Tsurenko	6	6
(Spain) N Párrizas Díaz	3	2

Semifinals
1	(Italy) J Paolini	6	4	6
4	(Ukraine) L Tsurenko	2	6	2

=== Bottom half ===
First round
8	(France) C Burel	6	6
(Spain) C Bucșa	2	2
(Latvia) D Semeņistaja	2	0
WC	E Andreeva	6	6
(Italy) L Stefanini	5	6	6
Q	(Italy) C Rosatello	7	3	1
WC	(Poland) K Kawa	6	3	7
3	(Italy) M Trevisan	3	6	5
5	(Slovakia) AK Schmiedlová	6	4	5
(Argentina) N Podoroska	3	6	7
(Spain) A Bolsova	6	4	0
(Japan) M Hontama	4	6	6
(Brazil) L Pigossi	3	2
I Shymanovich	6	6
Q	(Philippines) A Eala	5	0
2	(Belgium) E Mertens	7	6

Second round
8	(France) C Burel	6	5	7^{7}
WC	E Andreeva	0	7	6^{2}
(Italy) L Stefanini	6	6
WC	(Poland) K Kawa	4	1
(Argentina) N Podoroska	2	1
(Japan) M Hontama	6	6
I Shymanovich	3	2
2	(Belgium) E Mertens	6	6

Quarterfinals
8	(France) C Burel	6	6
(Italy) L Stefanini	3	1
(Japan) M Hontama	3	2
2	(Belgium) E Mertens	6	6

Semifinals
8	(France) C Burel	2	1
2	(Belgium) E Mertens	6	6

== Qualifying ==
=== Seeds ===
1. (United States) Sachia Vickery (qualifying competition, retired)
2. (Ukraine) Katarina Zavatska (qualified)
3. (France) Elsa Jacquemot (qualifying competition)
4. Iryna Shymanovich (moved to main draw)
5. (France) Carole Monnet (qualifying competition)
6. (France) Chloé Paquet (qualified)
7. (Serbia) Natalija Stevanović (qualifying competition)
8. (Philippines) Alexandra Eala (qualified)

=== Qualifiers ===
1. (France) Chloé Paquet
2. (Ukraine) Katarina Zavatska
3. (Philippines) Alexandra Eala
4. (Italy) Camilla Rosatello

=== Qualifying draw ===
==== First qualifier ====
First round
1	(United States) Sachia Vickery	6	6
(Czech Republic) Anna Sisková	3	4
(Turkey) Çağla Büyükakçay	4	4
6	(France) Chloé Paquet	6	6

Qualifying competition
1	(United States) Sachia Vickery	7^{7}	3	0^{r}
6	(France) Chloé Paquet	6^{4}	6	2

==== Second qualifier ====
First round
2	(Ukraine) Katarina Zavatska	3	6	6
(Greece) Despina Papamichail	6	2	4
WC	(Tunisia) Chiraz Bechri	0	1
7	(Serbia) Natalija Stevanović	6	6

Qualifying competition
2	(Ukraine) Katarina Zavatska	6	6
7	(Serbia) Natalija Stevanović	4	4

==== Third qualifier ====
First round
3	(France) Elsa Jacquemot	6	6
(Spain) Irene Burillo Escorihuela	3	4
WC	(Tunisia) Feryel Ben Hassen	1	0
8	(Philippines) Alexandra Eala	6	6

Qualifying competition
3	(France) Elsa Jacquemot	1	7	1
8	(Philippines) Alexandra Eala	6	5	6

==== Fourth qualifier ====
First round
Alt	(Switzerland) Conny Perrin	2	6	1
(Italy) Camilla Rosatello	6	3	6
(Poland) Weronika Falkowska	1	3
5	(France) Carole Monnet	6	6

Qualifying competition
(Italy) Camilla Rosatello	4	6	6
5	(France) Carole Monnet	6	4	1
