= 2024 Jasmin Open – Doubles =

Doubles
- 2024 Jasmin Open

Final
- Champions: Anna Blinkova (Egypt) Mayar Sherif
- Runners-up: Alina Korneeva; Anastasia Zakharova
- Score: 2–6, 6–1, [10–8]

Details
- Draw: 16
- Seeds: 4

Events
Singles	Doubles
← 2023 ·	Jasmin Open	· 2025 →

Anna Blinkova and Mayar Sherif defeated Alina Korneeva and Anastasia Zakharova in the final, 2–6, 6–1, [10–8] to win the doubles tennis title at the 2024 Jasmin Open. It was Sherif's first WTA Tour doubles title and Blinkova's second.

Sara Errani and Jasmine Paolini were the reigning champions, but did not participate this year.

== Seeds ==
1. (Italy) Camilla Rosatello / (Belgium) Kimberley Zimmermann (first round)
2. (United States) Quinn Gleason / (Brazil) Ingrid Martins (first round)
3. (United States) Sophie Chang / (United States) Alycia Parks (first round)
4. (United Kingdom) Emily Appleton / (Poland) Martyna Kubka (quarterfinals)

== Draw ==
=== Key ===
- Q = Qualifier
- WC = Wild card
- LL = Lucky loser
- Alt = Alternate
- ITF = ITF entry
- PR = Protected ranking
- SR = Special ranking
- SE = Special exempt
- JE = Junior exempt
- JR = Junior Accelerator Programme entrant
- CO = College Accelerator Programme entrant
- NG = Next Gen Accelerator Program entrant
- w/o = Walkover
- r = Retired
- d = Defaulted

=== Draw ===
First round
1	(Italy) C Rosatello (Belgium) K Zimmermann	5	1
(Italy) L Bronzetti (United Kingdom) J Burrage	7	6
(Japan) M Hontama (France) E Lechemia	6^{1}	4
A Blinkova (Egypt) M Sherif	7^{7}	6
4	(United Kingdom) E Appleton (Poland) M Kubka	6^{5}	6	[10]
(United Kingdom) F Christie (Colombia) Y Lizarazo	7^{7}	3	[7]
(Bosnia and Herzegovina) A Wagner; E Yashina	6	0	[10]
(Belgium) M Kempen (Belgium) L Salden	2	6	[8]
WC	(Algeria) I Ibbou (Switzerland) N Karamoko	6	6
(United Kingdom) A Barnett (Netherlands) I Haverlag	4	3
A Korneeva; A Zakharova	7	6
3	(United States) S Chang (United States) A Parks	5	2
A Falei; E Pridankina	6	6
(United Kingdom) M Lumsden (United Kingdom) L Miyazaki	0	3
(Georgia (country)) M Bolkvadze (Netherlands) S Lamens	4	6	[10]
2	(United States) Q Gleason (Brazil) I Martins	6	4	[2]

Quarterfinals
(Italy) L Bronzetti (United Kingdom) J Burrage	6	4	[3]
A Blinkova (Egypt) M Sherif	4	6	[10]
4	(United Kingdom) E Appleton (Poland) M Kubka	2	2
(Bosnia and Herzegovina) A Wagner; E Yashina	6	6
WC	(Algeria) I Ibbou (Switzerland) N Karamoko	4	0
A Korneeva; A Zakharova	6	6
A Falei; E Pridankina	6	7
(Georgia (country)) M Bolkvadze (Netherlands) S Lamens	4	5

Semifinals
A Blinkova (Egypt) M Sherif	6	6
(Bosnia and Herzegovina) A Wagner; E Yashina	1	2
A Korneeva; A Zakharova	6	6
A Falei; E Pridankina	3	4

Final
A Blinkova (Egypt) M Sherif	2	6	[10]
A Korneeva; A Zakharova	6	1	[8]
