= 2022 Jasmin Open – Doubles =

Doubles
- 2022 Jasmin Open

Final
- Champions: (France) Kristina Mladenovic (Czech Republic) Kateřina Siniaková
- Runners-up: (Japan) Miyu Kato (United States) Angela Kulikov
- Score: 6–2, 6–0

Details
- Draw: 16
- Seeds: 8

Events
Singles	Doubles
Jasmin Open	· 2023 →

Kristina Mladenovic and Kateřina Siniaková defeated Miyu Kato and Angela Kulikov in the final, 6–2, 6–0 to win the doubles tennis title at the 2022 Jasmin Open.

This was the first edition of the event.

== Seeds ==
1. (France) Kristina Mladenovic / (Czech Republic) Kateřina Siniaková (champions)
2. (Japan) Miyu Kato / (United States) Angela Kulikov (final)
3. (United States) Kaitlyn Christian / Lidziya Marozava (quarterfinals)
4. (Slovakia) Viktória Kužmová / (Romania) Elena-Gabriela Ruse (semifinals, withdrew)

== Draw ==
=== Key ===
- Q = Qualifier
- WC = Wild card
- LL = Lucky loser
- Alt = Alternate
- SE = Special exempt
- PR = Protected ranking
- ITF = ITF entry
- JE = Junior exempt
- w/o = Walkover
- r = Retired
- d = Defaulted
- SR = Special ranking

=== Draw ===
First round
1	(France) K Mladenovic (Czech Republic) K Siniaková	6	7
(France) E Lechemia (Germany) J Lohoff	4	5
(Netherlands) S Lamens; E Rodina	w/o
(Greece) D Papamichail (Italy) L Stefanini
3	(United States) K Christian; L Marozava	6	7^{7}
(Romania) J Cristian (France) D Parry	4	6^{4}
WC	(Algeria) I Ibbou (France) Y Mansouri	6^{3}	1
(Uzbekistan) N Abduraimova (China) L Zhu	7^{7}	6
(France) E Cascino (Australia) O Tjandramulia	2	2
(United Kingdom) E Appleton (United States) Q Gleason	6	6
(Brazil) L Pigossi (Japan) M Uchijima
4	(Slovakia) V Kužmová (Romania) E-G Ruse	w/o
A Fomina-Klotz; E Yashina	3	1
(United Kingdom) H Dart (United Kingdom) H Watson	6	6
(Netherlands) I Haverlag (India) P Thombare	1	2
2	(Japan) M Kato (United States) A Kulikov	6	6

Quarterfinals
1	(France) K Mladenovic (Czech Republic) K Siniaková	6	6
(Netherlands) S Lamens; E Rodina	0	3
3	(United States) K Christian; L Marozava	6	4	[5]
(Uzbekistan) N Abduraimova (China) L Zhu	0	6	[10]
(United Kingdom) E Appleton (United States) Q Gleason	2	2
4	(Slovakia) V Kužmová (Romania) E-G Ruse	6	6
(United Kingdom) H Dart (United Kingdom) H Watson	1	4
2	(Japan) M Kato (United States) A Kulikov	6	6

Semifinals
1	(France) K Mladenovic (Czech Republic) K Siniaková	6	6
(Uzbekistan) N Abduraimova (China) L Zhu	1	3
4	(Slovakia) V Kužmová (Romania) E-G Ruse
2	(Japan) M Kato (United States) A Kulikov	w/o

Final
1	(France) K Mladenovic (Czech Republic) K Siniaková	6	6
2	(Japan) M Kato (United States) A Kulikov	2	0
