= Portia Archer =

American sports executive

- Education: University of Chicago (AB); Columbia Business School (MBA)

Portia Archer is an American sports executive. She was previously the chief executive officer (CEO) of the Women's Tennis Association (WTA) and the chief operating officer (COO) of the NBA development competition G League.

== Career ==
Archer was raised in Chicago. She graduated from the University of Chicago in 1990 and Columbia Business School in 1998. Before going into sports management, she worked for AOL Time Warner, the BBC, HBO, and NBC Sports.

Archer became the NBA G League's first chief operating officer (COO) in February 2020. She helped lead the G League through the COVID-19 pandemic. She also became an adjunct professor in Columbia University's sports management graduate program.

On June 5, 2024, the Women's Tennis Association (WTA) announced that Archer would succeed Steve Simon as chief executive officer (CEO); she took the position on July 29, 2024. On April 22, 2026, WTA Tour chair Valerie Camillo announced that Archer had left the organization.
