= Steve Simon (tennis) =

American tennis executive

- Country (sports): United States

Grand Slam mixed doubles results
- Wimbledon: 1R (1981)

Steve Simon is an American tennis executive and former player who is the former chairman and chief executive officer (CEO) of the Women's Tennis Association (WTA).

== Career ==
He was born in California, and played college tennis for Long Beach State University. He qualified for the Mixed Doubles event at the 1981 Wimbledon Championships alongside Lea Antonoplis, where they lost in the first round.

Simon was the tournament director of the Indian Wells Open from 2004 to 2015, when he left to become the chief executive of the Women's Tennis Association.

In 2021, following the disappearance of Peng Shuai, Simon suspended all WTA tournaments in China, including the tour's long-term deal to hold the WTA Finals there. In December 2023, after the 2023 WTA Finals in Cancún where multiple players criticized the poor court conditions, the WTA announced that Simon would resign as CEO and become chairman. He was succeeded as CEO by Portia Archer.

On May 15, 2025, the WTA announced Simon's intention to retire as chairman in December 2025. On November 17, 2025, he was succeeded by Valerie Camillo.
