= 2023 Jasmin Open – Doubles =

Doubles
- 2023 Jasmin Open

Final
- Champions: (Italy) Sara Errani (Italy) Jasmine Paolini
- Runners-up: (Japan) Mai Hontama (Serbia) Natalija Stevanović
- Score: 2–6, 7–6^{(7–4)}, [10–6]

Details
- Draw: 16
- Seeds: 4

Events
Singles	Doubles
← 2022 ·	Jasmin Open	· 2024 →

Sara Errani and Jasmine Paolini defeated Mai Hontama and Natalija Stevanović in the final, 2–6, 7–6^{(7–4)}, [10–6] to win the doubles tennis title at the 2023 Jasmin Open. They saved a match point in the semifinals against Magdalena Fręch and Katarzyna Kawa.

Kristina Mladenovic and Kateřina Siniaková were the defending champions, but did not participate this year.

== Seeds ==
1. (Kazakhstan) Anna Danilina / Alexandra Panova (quarterfinals)
2. (Spain) Cristina Bucșa / (Netherlands) Bibiane Schoofs (quarterfinals)
3. (Poland) Weronika Falkowska / (Czech Republic) Anna Sisková (quarterfinals)
4. (Italy) Angelica Moratelli / (Italy) Camilla Rosatello (first round)

== Draw ==
=== Key ===
- Q = Qualifier
- WC = Wild card
- LL = Lucky loser
- Alt = Alternate
- SE = Special exempt
- PR = Protected ranking
- ITF = ITF entry
- JE = Junior exempt
- w/o = Walkover
- r = Retired
- d = Defaulted
- SR = Special ranking

=== Draw ===
First round
1	(Kazakhstan) A Danilina; A Panova	6	6
(Croatia) M Dražić (Latvia) D Semeņistaja	2	4
A Fomina-Klotz; I Shymanovich	3	7	[6]
(Italy) S Errani (Italy) J Paolini	6	5	[10]
3	(Poland) W Falkowska (Czech Republic) A Sisková	1	6	[14]
(United Kingdom) F Christie (Greece) D Papamichail	6	3	[12]
(Spain) M Bassols Ribera (Spain) J Bouzas Maneiro	4	2
(Poland) M Fręch (Poland) K Kawa	6	6
(Japan) M Hontama (Serbia) N Stevanović	6	6
WC	(Tunisia) C Bechri (Tunisia) F Ben Hassen	1	4
(Germany) J Lohoff (Switzerland) C Perrin	6	6
4	(Italy) A Moratelli (Italy) C Rosatello	2	4
WC	(Tunisia) H Heni (Tunisia) R Rassil	2	1
(Spain) A Bolsova (Georgia (country)) N Dzalamidze	6	6
(Philippines) A Eala (Romania) O Gavrilă	3	4
2	(Spain) C Bucșa (Netherlands) B Schoofs	6	6

Quarterfinals
1	(Kazakhstan) A Danilina; A Panova	1	3
(Italy) S Errani (Italy) J Paolini	6	6
3	(Poland) W Falkowska (Czech Republic) A Sisková	6	6^{4}	[5]
(Poland) M Fręch (Poland) K Kawa	2	7^{7}	[10]
(Japan) M Hontama (Serbia) N Stevanović	4	6	[10]
(Germany) J Lohoff (Switzerland) C Perrin	6	3	[6]
(Spain) A Bolsova (Georgia (country)) N Dzalamidze	7	6
2	(Spain) C Bucșa (Netherlands) B Schoofs	5	1

Semifinals
(Italy) S Errani (Italy) J Paolini	6^{4}	6	[11]
(Poland) M Fręch (Poland) K Kawa	7^{7}	3	[9]
(Japan) M Hontama (Serbia) N Stevanović	7	2	[10]
(Spain) A Bolsova (Georgia (country)) N Dzalamidze	5	6	[7]

Final
(Italy) S Errani (Italy) J Paolini	2	7^{7}	[10]
(Japan) M Hontama (Serbia) N Stevanović	6	6^{4}	[6]
