= 2023 Jasmin Open =

- Date: 16–22 October
- Edition: 2nd
- Category: WTA 250
- Draw: 32S / 16D
- Prize money: $259,303
- Surface: Hard (Outdoor)
- Location: Monastir, Tunisia
- Venue: Magic Hotel Skanes

Champions

Singles
- (Belgium) Elise Mertens

Doubles
- (Italy) Sara Errani / (Italy) Jasmine Paolini
- Jasmin Open

The 2023 Jasmin Open was a women's professional tennis tournament played on outdoor hardcourts. It was the second edition of the tournament and part of the WTA 250 tournaments on the 2023 WTA Tour. The event took place at the Magic Hotel Skanes in Monastir, Tunisia, from 16 through 22 October 2023.

== Champions ==
=== Singles ===
- (Belgium) Elise Mertens def. (Italy) Jasmine Paolini 6–3, 6–0

=== Doubles ===
- (Italy) Sara Errani / (Italy) Jasmine Paolini def. (Japan) Mai Hontama / (Serbia) Natalija Stevanović, 2–6, 7–6^{(7–4)}, [10–6]

== Singles main draw entrants ==
=== Seeds ===
Country	Player	Rank^{1}	Seed
ITA	Jasmine Paolini	31	1
BEL	Elise Mertens	41	2
ITA	Martina Trevisan	42	3
UKR	Lesia Tsurenko	43	4
SVK	Anna Karolína Schmiedlová	59	5
ITA	Lucia Bronzetti	63	6
POL	Magdalena Fręch	70	7
FRA	Clara Burel	73	8

- Rankings are as of 9 October 2023.

=== Other entrants ===
The following players received wildcards into the singles main draw:

- Erika Andreeva
- (Poland) Katarzyna Kawa
- (Croatia) Petra Marčinko

The following player received entry using a protected ranking:

- (Slovakia) Kristína Kučová

The following players received entry from the qualifying draw:

- (Philippines) Alexandra Eala
- (France) Chloé Paquet
- (Italy) Camilla Rosatello
- (Ukraine) Katarina Zavatska

=== Withdrawals ===
- (Germany) Tatjana Maria → replaced by (Spain) Jéssica Bouzas Maneiro
- (Czech Republic) Tereza Martincová → replaced by (Spain) Nuria Párrizas Díaz
- (Netherlands) Arantxa Rus → replaced by (Latvia) Darja Semeņistaja
- (United States) Peyton Stearns → replaced by (Brazil) Laura Pigossi

== Doubles main draw entrants ==
=== Seeds ===
Country	Player	Country	Player	Rank^{†}	Seed
KAZ	Anna Danilina		Alexandra Panova	93	1
ESP	Cristina Bucșa	NED	Bibiane Schoofs	151	2
POL	Weronika Falkowska	CZE	Anna Sisková	168	3
ITA	Angelica Moratelli	ITA	Camilla Rosatello	183	4

- ^{1} Rankings as of 9 October 2023.

=== Other entrants ===
The following pair received a wildcard into the doubles main draw:

- (Tunisia) Chiraz Bechri / (Tunisia) Feryel Ben Hassen
- (Tunisia) Hiba Heni / (Tunisia) Ranim Rassil
