= 2022 Jasmin Open – Singles =

Singles
- 2022 Jasmin Open

Final
- Champion: (Belgium) Elise Mertens
- Runner-up: (France) Alizé Cornet
- Score: 6–2, 6–0

Details
- Draw: 32 (3 WC, 6Q)
- Seeds: 8

Events
| Singles | Doubles |
- Jasmin Open

Elise Mertens defeated Alizé Cornet in the final, 6–2, 6–0 to win the inaugural singles tennis title at the 2022 Jasmin Open.

This marked the first WTA Tour-level appearance of future French Open champion Mirra Andreeva. She was defeated in the first round by Anastasia Potapova.

== Seeds ==
1. (Tunisia) Ons Jabeur (quarterfinals)
2. Veronika Kudermetova (semifinals)
3. (France) Alizé Cornet (final)
4. (Croatia) Petra Martić (second round)
5. (Belgium) Elise Mertens (champion)
6. Anastasia Potapova (second round)
7. (Czech Republic) Kateřina Siniaková (second round)
8. (Poland) Magda Linette (first round)

== Draw ==
Key

- Q = Qualifier
- WC = Wild card
- LL = Lucky loser
- Alt = Alternate
- ITF = ITF entry
- PR = Protected ranking
- SR = Special ranking
- SE = Special exempt
- JE = Junior exempt
- JR = Junior Accelerator Programme entrant
- CO = College Accelerator Programme entrant
- NG = Next Gen Accelerator Program entrant
- w/o = Walkover
- r = Retired
- d = Defaulted

=== Finals ===
Semifinals
(United States) Claire Liu | 4 | 0
5 | (Belgium) Elise Mertens | 6 | 6
3/WC | (France) Alizé Cornet | 6 | 6
2 | Veronika Kudermetova | 4 | 3

Final
5 | (Belgium) Elise Mertens | 6 | 6
3/WC | (France) Alizé Cornet | 2 | 0

=== Top half ===
First round
1 | (Tunisia) O Jabeur | 6 | 6
(United States) A Li | 2 | 3
PR | E Rodina | 6 | 6
(Romania) E-G Ruse | 1 | 3
Q | (Croatia) A Konjuh | 3 | 2
(United States) C Liu | 6 | 6
(France) C Paquet | 4 | 0^{r}
7 | (Czech Republic) K Siniaková | 6 | 4
4 | (Croatia) P Martić | 6 | 7
Q | (Czech Republic) L Fruhvirtová | 2 | 5
Q | (Japan) M Uchijima | 6 | 6
K Rakhimova | 3 | 3
(China) L Zhu | 6 | 6^{2} | 0
Q | (Greece) D Papamichail | 1 | 7^{7} | 6
(Romania) J Cristian | 1 | 1
5 | (Belgium) E Mertens | 6 | 6

Second round
1 | (Tunisia) O Jabeur | 6 | 6
PR | E Rodina | 1 | 3
(United States) C Liu | 7 | 6
7 | (Czech Republic) K Siniaková | 5 | 2
4 | (Croatia) P Martić | 5 | 6^{5}
Q | (Japan) M Uchijima | 7 | 7^{7}
Q | (Greece) D Papamichail | 7 | 1 | 2
5 | (Belgium) E Mertens | 5 | 6 | 6

Quarterfinals
1 | (Tunisia) O Jabeur | 3 | 6 | 4
(United States) C Liu | 6 | 4 | 6
Q | (Japan) M Uchijima | 0 | 6 | 4
5 | (Belgium) E Mertens | 6 | 3 | 6

Semifinals
(United States) C Liu | 4 | 0
5 | (Belgium) E Mertens | 6 | 6

=== Bottom half ===
First round
6 | A Potapova | 6 | 6^{4} | 6
WC | M Andreeva | 3 | 7^{7} | 3
(Slovenia) T Zidanšek | 5 | 6 | 7
Q | (Spain) M Bassols Ribera | 7 | 3 | 5
(United Kingdom) H Dart | 6 | 6
(Spain) N Párrizas Díaz | 2 | 4
(Brazil) L Pigossi | 6^{3} | 0
3/WC | (France) A Cornet | 7^{7} | 6
8 | (Poland) M Linette | 6 | 4 | 4
Q | (Italy) L Stefanini | 2 | 6 | 6
LL | (France) H Tan | 4 | 6 | 1
(France) D Parry | 6 | 2 | 6
WC | (France) Y Mansouri | 3 | 2
(Poland) M Fręch | 6 | 6
V Gracheva | 1 | 0
2 | V Kudermetova | 6 | 6

Second round
6 | A Potapova | 3 | 6 | 2
(Slovenia) T Zidanšek | 6 | 3 | 6
(United Kingdom) H Dart | 3 | 4
3/WC | (France) A Cornet | 6 | 6
Q | (Italy) L Stefanini | 3 | 0^{r}
(France) D Parry | 6 | 1
(Poland) M Fręch | 3 | 4
2 | V Kudermetova | 6 | 6

Quarterfinals
(Slovenia) T Zidanšek | 5 | 6^{7}
3/WC | (France) A Cornet | 7 | 7^{9}
(France) D Parry | 4 | 1
2 | V Kudermetova | 6 | 6

Semifinals
3/WC | (France) A Cornet | 6 | 6
2 | V Kudermetova | 4 | 3

== Qualifying ==
=== Seeds ===
1. (Czech Republic) Linda Fruhvirtová (qualified)
2. (France) Harmony Tan (qualifying competition, retired, lucky loser)
3. (Japan) Moyuka Uchijima (qualified)
4. (France) Kristina Mladenovic (qualifying competition)
5. (United Kingdom) Heather Watson (qualifying competition)
6. (Croatia) Ana Konjuh (qualified)
7. (Slovakia) Viktória Kužmová (qualifying competition)
8. (Italy) Lucrezia Stefanini (qualified)
9. (Greece) Despina Papamichail (qualified)
10. (Spain) Marina Bassols Ribera (qualified)
11. (Uzbekistan) Nigina Abduraimova (qualifying competition)
12. (Spain) Rebeka Masarova (qualifying competition)

=== Qualifiers ===
1. (Czech Republic) Linda Fruhvirtová
2. (Spain) Marina Bassols Ribera
3. (Japan) Moyuka Uchijima
4. (Greece) Despina Papamichail
5. (Italy) Lucrezia Stefanini
6. (Croatia) Ana Konjuh

=== Lucky loser ===
1. (France) Harmony Tan

=== Qualifying draw ===
==== First qualifier ====
| First round | | | | Qualifying competition |
| | | | | 1 | (Czech Republic) Linda Fruhvirtová | 5 | 6 | 7^{10} |
| | | | | 12 | (Spain) Rebeka Masarova | 7 | 1 | 6^{8} |
| | Yuliya Hatouka | 1 | 5 | 12 | (Spain) Rebeka Masarova | 7 | 1 | 6^{8} |
| 12 | (Spain) Rebeka Masarova | 6 | 7 |

==== Second qualifier ====
| First round | | | | | Qualifying competition |
| | | | | | 2 | (France) Harmony Tan | 3 | 0^{r} |
| | | | | | 10 | (Spain) Marina Bassols Ribera | 6 | 0 |
| | (Australia) Olivia Tjandramulia | 6 | 1 | 4 | 10 | (Spain) Marina Bassols Ribera | 6 | 0 |
| 10 | (Spain) Marina Bassols Ribera | 3 | 6 | 6 |

==== Third qualifier ====
| First round | | | | Qualifying competition |
| | | | | 3 | (Japan) Moyuka Uchijima | 6 | 6 |
| | | | | 11 | (Uzbekistan) Nigina Abduraimova | 2 | 2 |
| WC | (France) Elixane Lechemia | 1 | 4 | 11 | (Uzbekistan) Nigina Abduraimova | 2 | 2 |
| 11 | (Uzbekistan) Nigina Abduraimova | 6 | 6 |

==== Fourth qualifier ====
First round
4 | (France) Kristina Mladenovic | 6 | 6
WC | (Germany) Julia Lohoff | 1 | 2
(Algeria) Inès Ibbou | 3 | 2
9 | (Greece) Despina Papamichail | 6 | 6

Qualifying competition
4 | (France) Kristina Mladenovic | 6 | 2 | 4
9 | (Greece) Despina Papamichail | 2 | 6 | 6

==== Fifth qualifier ====
First round
5 | (United Kingdom) Heather Watson | 6 | 7
(Netherlands) Suzan Lamens | 3 | 5
(Bulgaria) Isabella Shinikova | 7^{11} | 0 | 4
8 | (Italy) Lucrezia Stefanini | 6^{9} | 6 | 6

Qualifying competition
5 | (United Kingdom) Heather Watson | 1 | 3
8 | (Italy) Lucrezia Stefanini | 6 | 6

==== Sixth qualifier ====
First round
6 | (Croatia) Ana Konjuh | 6 | 6
(Indonesia) Priska Nugroho | 4 | 2
WC | (Tunisia) Feryel Ben Hassen | 5 | 2
7 | (Slovakia) Viktória Kužmová | 7 | 6

Qualifying competition
6 | (Croatia) Ana Konjuh | 6 | 6
7 | (Slovakia) Viktória Kužmová | 3 | 2
