= Anastasia Zakharova =

Russian tennis player (born 2002)

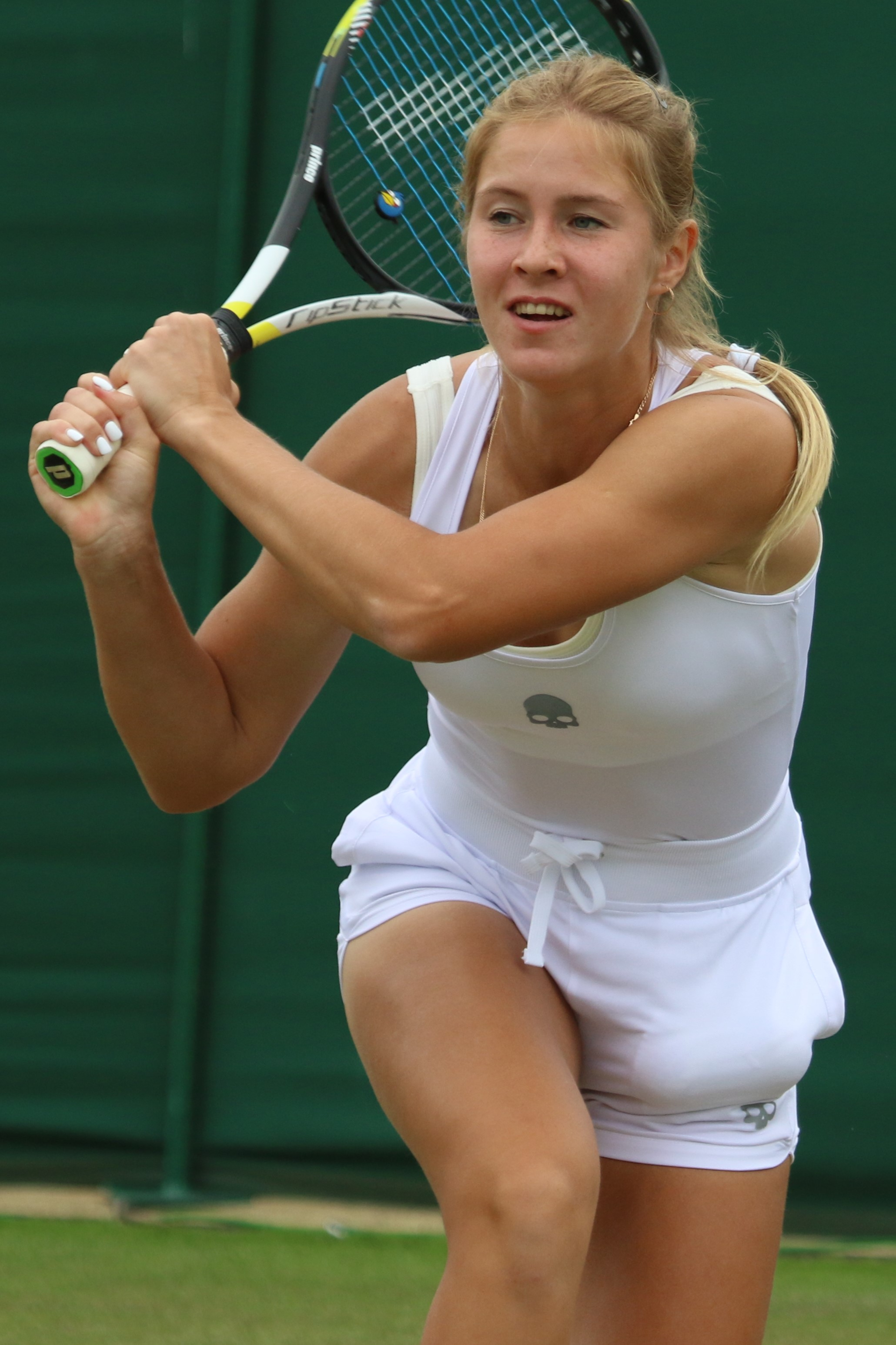
- Zakharova at the Wimbledon Championships
- Full name: Anastasia Vladimirovna Zakharova
- Country (sports): Russia
- Born: 18 January 2002 (age 24) Volgograd, Russia
- Height: 1.70 m (5 ft 7 in)
- Plays: Right-handed
- Prize money: $2,009,639

Singles
- Career record: 323–192
- Career titles: 0 WTA, 16 ITF
- Highest ranking: No. 65 (6 April 2026)
- Current ranking: No. 102 (16 November 2026)

Grand Slam singles results
- Australian Open: 3R (2024)
- French Open: 1R (2026)
- Wimbledon: 2R (2025)
- US Open: 2R (2025)

Doubles
- Career record: 98–67
- Career titles: 8 ITF
- Highest ranking: No. 93 (26 September 2022)
- Current ranking: No. 382 (16 November 2026)

Grand Slam doubles results
- French Open: 2R (2026)
- Last updated on: 22 November 2026.

Anastasia Vladimirovna Zakharova (Russian: Анастасия Владимировна Захарова; born 18 January 2002) is a Russian tennis player. She has career-high WTA rankings of No. 65 in singles, achieved on 6 April 2026, and No. 93 in doubles. Zakharova has won sixteen singles and eight doubles titles on the ITF Women's Circuit.

== Career ==
=== 2021-2023: WTA Tour debut ===
Zakharova made her WTA Tour main-draw debut at the 2021 Poland Open, where she received entry into the singles tournament as a lucky loser but lost to Ekaterine Gorgodze in the first round.

She recorded her first tour win at the 2023 Thailand Open in Hua Hin over Anna Karolína Schmiedlová, before losing her next match to top seed Bianca Andreescu.

=== 2024: Australian third round, Hong Kong quarterfinals ===
Ranked No. 190, Zakharova qualified for the Australian Open, making her Grand Slam tournament debut. She recorded wins over Yulia Putintseva and Kaja Juvan, before losing in the third round to Magdalena Fręch.

In September at the Jasmin Open in Morocco, Zakharova lost in the first round to top seed Elise Mertens. In doubles, she reached the final partnering Alina Korneeva, but they lost to Anna Blinkova and Mayar Sherif.

She reached her first quarterfinal at the Hong Kong Open in October with wins over lucky loser Jang Su-jeong and seventh seed Varvara Gracheva, before losing to second seed Katie Boulter.

=== 2025: First top-30 win, maiden tour semifinal ===
In June, Zakharova qualified for the Queen's Club Championships in London and defeated world No. 21, Donna Vekić, to record her first win against a top-30 ranked player. She lost to second seed Madison Keys in the second round. Two weeks later Zakharova qualified to make her main-draw debut at Wimbledon and overcame Victoria Azarenka to reach the second round, where she lost to Dayana Yastremska in a match that went to a final set tiebreak.

Zakharova made it into her first WTA Tour semifinal at Tennis in Cleveland defeating Kimberly Birrell and Hailey Baptiste, before being given a walkover into the last four when Eva Lys withdrew from the tournament. She lost in the last four to qualifier and eventual champion Sorana Cîrstea. The following week, Zakharova made her main-draw debut at the US Open, defeating Elina Avanesyan in straight sets to reach the second round, at which point she lost to Laura Siegemund.

=== 2026: Chennai semifinal, Miami third round ===
Zakharova qualified for the WTA 1000 Miami Open and recorded three-set wins over Anna Bondár and 22nd seed Anna Kalinskaya, before losing to 10th seed Victoria Mboko in the third round. At the Memphis Tennis Classic, she defeated Linda Fruhvirtová and fifth seed Camila Osorio to reach the quarterfinals, where she lost to Renata Zarazúa. Seeded seventh at the Chennai Open, Zakharova overcame Polina Iatcenko, wildcard entrant Vaishnavi Adkar and 10th seed Lucrezia Stefanini, who retired due to injury on match point while trailing by a set and two breaks of serve, to make it into her second WTA Tour semifinal. In the last four she lost to third seed Magda Linette in three sets.

== Performance timeline ==
Key
W	F	SF	QF	#R	RR	Q#	P#	DNQ	A	Z#	PO	G	S	B	NMS	NTI	P	NH

(W) winner; (F) finalist; (SF) semifinalist; (QF) quarterfinalist; (#R) rounds 4, 3, 2, 1; (RR) round-robin stage; (Q#) qualification round; (P#) preliminary round; (DNQ) did not qualify; (A) absent; (Z#) Davis/Fed Cup Zonal Group (with number indication) or (PO) play-off; (G) gold, (S) silver or (B) bronze Olympic/Paralympic medal; (NMS) not a Masters tournament; (NTI) not a Tier I tournament; (P) postponed; (NH) not held; (SR) strike rate (events won / competed); (W–L) win–loss record.
To avoid confusion and double counting, these charts are updated at the conclusion of a tournament or when the player's participation has ended.

=== Singles ===
Current through the 2026 Wuhan Open.

Tournament	2021	2022	2023	2024	2025	2026	W–L
Grand Slam tournaments
Australian Open	Q1	Q1	Q1	3R	Q2	1R	2–2
French Open	A	Q1	Q2	Q3	Q1	1R	0–1
Wimbledon	A	A	Q1	Q2	2R	1R	1–2
US Open	A	Q3	A	Q1	2R	1R	1–2
Win–Loss	0–0	0–0	0–0	2–1	2–2	0–4	4–7
WTA 1000 tournaments
Qatar Open	NT1	A	NT1	A	Q1	1R	0–1
Dubai Championships	A	NT1	A	A	Q2	2R	1–1
Indian Wells Open	A	A	A	A	Q1	2R	1–1
Miami Open	A	A	A	A	A	3R	2–1
Madrid Open	A	A	A	Q1	Q1	1R	0–1
Italian Open	A	A	A	A	Q1	2R	1–1
Cincinnati Open	A	A	A	A	Q2	Q1	0–0
China Open	Not held		A	A	1R	2R	1–2
Wuhan Open	Not held			A	1R	Q1	0–1
Win–Loss	0–0	0–0	0–0	0–0	0–2	5–7	6–9

== WTA Tour finals ==
=== Doubles: 3 (3 runner-ups) ===
Legend WTA 500 WTA 250 (0–3)	Finals by surface Hard (0–3) Clay (0–0)	Finals by setting Outdoor (0–2) Indoor (0–1)

Result	W–L	Date	Tournament	Tier	Surface	Partner	Opponent	Score
Loss	0–1	Oct 2021	Astana Open, Kazakhstan	WTA 250	Hard (i)	(Russia) Angelina Gabueva	(Germany) Anna-Lena Friedsam (Romania) Monica Niculescu	2–6, 6–4, [5–10]
Loss	0–2	Jul 2022	Prague Open, Czech Republic	WTA 250	Hard	Angelina Gabueva	Anastasia Potapova; Yana Sizikova	3–6, 4–6
Loss	0–3	Sep 2024	Jasmin Open, Tunisia	WTA 250	Hard	Alina Korneeva	Anna Blinkova (Egypt) Mayar Sherif	6–2, 1–6, [8–10]

== WTA 125 finals ==
=== Doubles: 1 (runner-up) ===
Result	Date	Tournament	Surface	Partner	Opponents	Score
Loss	Dec 2022	Andorrà Open, Andorra	Hard (i)	Angelina Gabueva	(Spain) Cristina Bucșa (Poland) Weronika Falkowska	6–7^{(4–7)}, 1–6

== ITF Circuit finals ==
=== Singles: 20 (16 titles, 4 runner-ups) ===
Legend W100 tournaments W50 tournaments W25 tournaments W15 tournaments	Finals by surface Hard (13–4) Clay (3–0)

Result	W–L	Date	Tournament	Tier	Surface	Opponent	Score
Loss	0–1	Feb 2019	ITF Shymkent, Kazakhstan	W15	Hard	(Russia) Daria Kruzhkova	3–6, 6–2, 1–6
Win	1–1	Apr 2019	ITF Shymkent, Kazakhstan	W15	Clay	(Kazakhstan) Gozal Ainitdinova	6–0, 6–0
Win	2–1	May 2019	ITF Tbilisi, Georgia	W15	Hard	(Russia) Taisya Pachkaleva	6–2, 6–1
Win	3–1	Jun 2019	ITF Netanya, Israel	W15	Hard	(Russia) Ekaterina Vishnevskaya	6–2, 2–0 ret.
Win	4–1	Sep 2019	ITF Shymkent, Kazakhstan	W15	Clay	(Russia) Angelina Zhuravleva	6–2, 6–2
Win	5–1	Nov 2019	ITF Minsk, Belarus	W25	Hard	(Russia) Marina Melnikova	6–4, 6–3
Win	6–1	Jan 2020	ITF Kazan, Russia	W25	Hard	(Serbia) Dejana Radanović	6–3, 6–2
Win	7–1	Mar 2022	Nur-Sultan Challenger, Kazakhstan	W25	Hard (i)	Mariia Tkacheva	6–3, 6–1
Win	8–1	Jun 2022	ITF Tbilisi, Georgia	W25	Hard	Kristina Dmitruk	6–4, 6–0
Win	9–1	Jun 2022	ITF Tbilisi, Georgia	W25	Hard	Darya Astakhova	6–2, 3–6, 6–2
Win	10–1	Mar 2023	ITF Jakarta, Indonesia	W25	Hard	(China) Bai Zhuoxuan	3–6, 6–3, 6–4
Win	11–1	Aug 2023	ITF Nakhon Si Thammarat, Thailand	W25	Hard	Aliona Falei	6–2, 6–4
Win	12–1	Aug 2023	ITF Nakhon Si Thammarat	W25	Hard	Anastasia Kovaleva	6–3, 6–3
Loss	12–2	Sep 2023	ITF Leiria, Portugal	W25	Hard	(United Kingdom) Sonay Kartal	6–7^{(5)}, 6–1, 3–6
Win	13–2	Jul 2024	Figueira da Foz Open, Portugal	W100	Hard	(France) Kristina Mladenovic	6–2, 6–1
Loss	13–3	Sep 2024	Caldas da Rainha Open, Portugal	W100	Hard	Alina Korneeva	1–6, 4–6
Win	14–3	Oct 2024	ITF Cherbourg-en-Cotentin, France	W50	Hard (i)	(Czech Republic) Barbora Palicová	3–6, 6–1, 6–4
Win	15–3	Oct 2024	Internacional Els Gorchs, Spain	W100	Hard	Alina Charaeva	6–3, 6–1
Win	16–3	Apr 2025	Zaragoza Open, Spain	W100	Clay	(Spain) Kaitlin Quevedo	6–3, 6–1
Loss	16–4	Aug 2026	Landisville Tennis Challenge, US	W100	Hard	(Belgium) Hanne Vandewinkel	6–3, 3–6, 1–6

=== Doubles: 12 (8 titles, 4 runner-ups) ===
Legend W100 tournaments W40 tournaments W25 tournaments W15 tournaments	Finals by surface Hard (7–4) Clay (1–0)

Result	W–L	Date	Tournament	Tier	Surface	Partner	Opponents	Score
Win	1–0	Feb 2019	ITF Shymkent, Kazakhstan	W15	Hard	(Russia) Ekaterina Kazionova	(Serbia) Tamara Čurović (Estonia) Elena Malõgina	7–6^{(4)}, 6–1
Win	2–0	Apr 2019	ITF Shymkent, Kazakhstan	W15	Clay	(Serbia) Tamara Čurović	(Kazakhstan) Dariya Detkovskaya (Kazakhstan) Zhibek Kulambayeva	7–5, 6–2
Win	3–0	Jun 2019	Netanya, Israel	W15	Hard	(Kazakhstan) Yekaterina Dmitrichenko	(Israel) Shelly Bereznyak (Israel) Lina Glushko	6–0, 6–4
Win	4–0	Jan 2020	ITF Kazan, Russia	W25	Hard	(Russia) Ekaterina Yashina	(Russia) Natela Dzalamidze (Russia) Yana Sizikova	6–2, 6–4
Win	5–0	Feb 2021	ITF Moscow, Russia	W25	Hard	(Greece) Valentini Grammatikopoulou	(Russia) Ekaterina Kazionova (Belarus) Shalimar Talbi	6–3, 5–7, [10–8]
Loss	5–1	Mar 2021	ITF Kazan, Russia	W25	Hard	(Greece) Valentini Grammatikopoulou	(Belarus) Shalimar Talbi (Norway) Ulrikke Eikeri	4–6, 0–6
Loss	5–2	Nov 2021	Dubai Tennis Challenge, UAE	W100	Hard	(Russia) Angelina Gabueva	(Kazakhstan) Anna Danilina (Slovakia) Viktória Kužmová	6–4, 3–6, [2–10]
Loss	5–3	Feb 2022	ITF Sharm El Sheikh, Egypt	W25	Hard	(Belarus) Yuliya Hatouka	(Greece) Sapfo Sakellaridi (Hong Kong) Cody Wong	5–7, 6–4, [6–10]
Win	6–3	Jun 2022	ITF Tbilisi, Georgia	W25	Hard	Angelina Gabueva	Anna Kubareva; Darya Astakhova	6–1, 6–2
Win	7–3	Jun 2022	ITF Tbilisi, Georgia	W25	Hard	Angelina Gabueva	Polina Kudermetova; Sofya Lansere	6–4, 6–3
Loss	7–4	May 2023	ITF Tbilisi, Georgia	W40	Hard	Anastasia Zolotareva	(Georgia (country)) Ekaterine Gorgodze (India) Ankita Raina	6–4, 2–6, [6–10]
Win	8–4	Oct 2023	ITF Istanbul, Turkey	W25	Hard	Ekaterina Yashina	(Slovenia) Dalila Jakupović (Bosnia and Herzegovina) Anita Wagner	6–3, 6–4
