= Jasmin Open =

Defunct tennis tournament
- Founded: 2022
- Abolished: 2024
- Location: Monastir; Tunisia
- Venue: Skanes Family Resort
- Category: WTA 250
- Surface: Hard
- Draw: 32S / 24Q / 16D
- Prize money: US$267,082
- Website: jasminopen.com

Current champions (2024)
- Singles: (United Kingdom) Sonay Kartal
- Doubles: Anna Blinkova (Egypt) Mayar Sherif

The Jasmin Open was a tennis event held at the Skanes Family Resort on outdoor hardcourts in Monastir, Tunisia. The first edition was played in October 2022. Jasmin Open was part of the WTA Tour and was listed as a WTA 250 tournament. The tournament was introduced in 2022 as a result of the cancellation of WTA events in China due to the Peng Shuai sexual assault and disappearance controversy. Another significant reason to introduce this tournament was the rise of Tunisian player, Ons Jabeur in the WTA rankings.

== History ==
The Jasmin Open Monastir was added to the 40th week of the season in May 2022 following cancellation of WTA events in China due to the disappearance of Peng Shuai, who in November 2021 accused former Vice Premier Zhang Gaoli of sexual violence. As a result of the Russian invasion of Ukraine at the end of February 2022, the ATP, WTA and ITF tennis governing bodies of the Grand Slams decided that Russian and Belarusian tennis players could continue to compete on the circuits, but not under the flags of Russia or Belarus until further notice. Belgian Elise Mertens won her seventh singles title on the WTA Tour circuit. The doubles was dominated by the Czech Kateřina Siniaková and the French Kristina Mladenovic, who fulfilled the role of favorites and turned their first joint participation in doubles competitions into a trophy.

== Past finals ==
=== Singles ===
Year	Champion	Runner-up	Score
2022	(Belgium) Elise Mertens	(France) Alizé Cornet	6–2, 6–0
2023	(Belgium) Elise Mertens (2)	(Italy) Jasmine Paolini	6–3, 6–0
2024	(United Kingdom) Sonay Kartal	(Slovakia) Rebecca Šramková	6–3, 7–5

=== Doubles ===
Year	Champions	Runners-up	Score
2022	(France) Kristina Mladenovic (Czech Republic) Kateřina Siniaková	(Japan) Miyu Kato (United States) Angela Kulikov	6–2, 6–0
2023	(Italy) Sara Errani (Italy) Jasmine Paolini	(Japan) Mai Hontama (Serbia) Natalija Stevanović	2–6, 7–6^{(7–4)}, [10–6]
2024	Anna Blinkova (Egypt) Mayar Sherif	Alina Korneeva; Anastasia Zakharova	2–6, 6–1, [10–8]

== See also ==
- Tunis Open
- Nana Trophy
- List of tennis tournaments
