= Yasmine Mansouri =

French tennis player (born 2001)

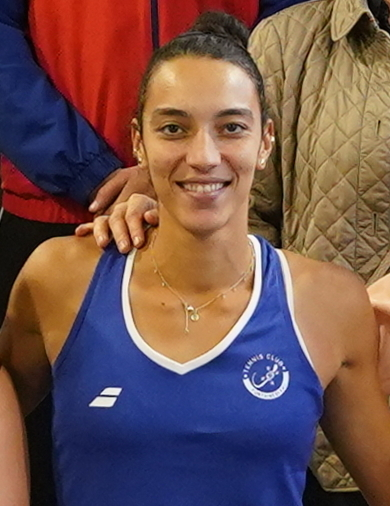
- Fontainebleau, 2025
- Country (sports): France
- Born: 15 May 2001 (age 25)
- Plays: Right (two-handed backhand)
- Prize money: $157,391

Singles
- Career record: 272–243
- Career titles: 6 ITF
- Highest ranking: No. 314 (24 February 2025)
- Current ranking: No. 419 (28 September 2026)

Doubles
- Career record: 207–123
- Career titles: 17 ITF
- Highest ranking: No. 215 (19 August 2024)
- Current ranking: No. 306 (28 September 2026)
- Last updated on: 1 October 2026.

Yasmine Mansouri (born 15 May 2001) is a French tennis player.

Mansouri has a career-high singles ranking by the WTA of 314, achieved on 24 February 2025. She also has a career-high WTA doubles ranking of 215, achieved on 19 August 2024. Mansouri has won six singles titles and 17 doubles titles on the ITF Circuit.

She made her WTA Tour main-draw debut in Tunisia at the 2022 Jasmin Open, losing in the first round to Magdalena Fręch.

== ITF Circuit finals ==
=== Singles: 13 (6 titles, 7 runner-ups) ===
Legend W50 tournaments (0–1) W35 tournaments (2–1) W10/15 tournaments (4–5)	Finals by surface Hard (6–5) Clay (0–2)

Result	W–L	Date	Tournament	Tier	Surface	Opponent	Score
Loss	0–1	Nov 2016	ITF Hammamet, Tunisia	W10	Clay	(Germany) Katharina Hobgarski	4–6, 2–6
Loss	0–2	Nov 2017	ITF Hammamet, Tunisia	W15	Clay	(Finland) Mia Eklund	6–7^{(1)}, 4–6
Loss	0–3	Jul 2022	ITF Monastir, Tunisia	W15	Hard	(France) Manon Léonard	2–6, 2–6
Win	1–3	Jul 2022	ITF Monastir, Tunisia	W15	Hard	(China) Yao Xinxin	6–2, 6–4
Loss	1–4	Sep 2022	ITF Monastir, Tunisia	W15	Hard	(Switzerland) Nadine Keller	2–6, 6–7^{(7)}
Win	2–4	Jul 2024	ITF Monastir, Tunisia	W15	Hard	(Spain) Noelia Bouzó Zanotti	6–3, 6–1
Win	3–4	Jul 2024	Open Castilla y León, Spain	W35	Hard	(Bulgaria) Lia Karatancheva	6–2, 6–7^{(5)}, 7–5
Win	4–4	Aug 2024	ITF Monastir, Tunisia	W15	Hard	(Japan) Hiromi Abe	5–7, 6–3, 6–1
Win	5–4	Aug 2024	ITF Monastir, Tunisia	W15	Hard	(Italy) Camilla Zanolini	6–3, 6–2
Loss	5–5	Oct 2024	ITF Quinta do Lago, Portugal	W50	Hard	Kristina Dmitruk	4–6, 3–6
Win	6–5	Sep 2025	ITF Monastir, Tunisia	W35	Hard	(United States) Carolyn Ansari	6–2, 7–5
Loss	6–6	Dec 2025	ITF Monastir, Tunisia	W15	Hard	(Greece) Sapfo Sakellaridi	5–7, 2–6
Loss	6–7	May 2026	ITF Monastir, Tunisia	W35	Hard	Victoria Milovanova	2–6, 6–2, 4–6

=== Doubles: 40 (17 titles, 23 runner-ups) ===
Legend W40/50 tournaments (1–2) W25/35 tournaments (5–9) W15 tournaments (11–12)	Finals by surface Hard (13–18) Clay (4–5)

Result	W–L	Date	Tournament	Tier	Surface	Partner	Opponents	Score
Win	1–0	Oct 2017	ITF Hammamet, Tunisia	W15	Clay	(Croatia) Lea Bošković	(Croatia) Mariana Dražić (Bulgaria) Isabella Shinikova	1–6, 6–4, [10–6]
Loss	1–1	Oct 2017	ITF Hammamet, Tunisia	W15	Clay	(France) Loudmilla Bencheikh	(Finland) Mia Eklund (Germany) Julyette Steur	4–6, 6–4, [7–10]
Win	2–1	Oct 2017	ITF Hammamet, Tunisia	W15	Clay	(France) Diane Parry	(Netherlands) Dominique Karregat (France) Caroline Romeo	6–1, 6–1
Win	3–1	Oct 2018	ITF Monastir, Tunisia	W15	Hard	(France) Loudmilla Bencheikh	(Germany) Natalia Siedliska (Italy) Miriana Tona	6–4, 6–1
Loss	3–2	Nov 2019	ITF Tabarka, Tunisia	W15	Hard	(Burundi) Sada Nahimana	(Ukraine) Ganna Poznikhirenko (Germany) Julyette Steur	6–7^{(9)}, 3–6
Win	4–2	Dec 2019	ITF Monastir, Tunisia	W15	Hard	(Switzerland) Marie Mettraux	(France) Carole Monnet (Russia) Mariia Tkacheva	6–4, 3–6, [10–6]
Win	5–2	Sep 2020	ITF Saint Palais sur Mer, France	W15	Clay	(France) Lucie Wargnier	(France) Anaëlle Leclercq (France) Lucie Nguyen Tan	6–0, 6–3
Loss	5–3	Feb 2021	ITF Monastir, Tunisia	W15	Hard	(Serbia) Elena Milovanović	(Poland) Weronika Falkowska (Czech Republic) Linda Fruhvirtová	3–6, 1–6
Loss	5–4	Mar 2021	ITF Monastir, Tunisia	W15	Hard	(Finland) Anastasia Kulikova	(Netherlands) Isabelle Haverlag (Russia) Anastasia Pribylova	3–6, 1–6
Loss	5–5	Sep 2021	ITF Monastir, Tunisia	W15	Hard	(Japan) Himari Sato	(China) Ma Yexin (Russia) Ekaterina Reyngold	2–6, 2–6
Win	6–5	Oct 2021	ITF Monastir, Tunisia	W15	Hard	(Russia) Ekaterina Reyngold	(Japan) Honoka Kobayashi (China) Ma Yexin	6–1, 6–3
Win	7–5	Oct 2021	ITF Monastir, Tunisia	W15	Hard	(Austria) Tamira Paszek	(Germany) Laura Böhner (Serbia) Mihaela Djaković	6–1, 6–1
Win	8–5	Nov 2021	ITF Monastir, Tunisia	W15	Hard	(Serbia) Elena Milovanović	(Croatia) Mariana Dražić (Germany) Julia Middendorf	7–6^{(4)}, 6–0
Loss	8–6	Nov 2021	ITF Monastir, Tunisia	W15	Hard	(Italy) Alessandra Simone	(Japan) Rina Saigo (Japan) Yukina Saigo	0–6, 6–4, [5–10]
Win	9–6	Apr 2022	ITF Monastir, Tunisia	W15	Hard	(France) Nina Radovanovic	(China) Wang Meiling (China) Yao Xinxin	7–5, 6–3
Loss	9–7	Jul 2022	ITF Monastir, Tunisia	W15	Hard	(Tunisia) Diana Chehoudi	(Japan) Yuka Hosoki (Japan) Eri Shimizu	3–6, 2–6
Loss	9–8	Aug 2022	ITF Monastir, Tunisia	W15	Hard	(Japan) Naho Sato	(Japan) Saki Imamura (Indonesia) Priska Madelyn Nugroho	1–6, 3–6
Win	10–8	May 2023	ITF Monastir, Tunisia	W25	Hard	(United Kingdom) Lauryn John-Baptiste	(Egypt) Lamis Alhussein Abdel Aziz (India) Sharmada Balu	6–3, 6–1
Loss	10–9	Aug 2023	ITF Ourense, Spain	W25	Hard	(Romania) Karola Patricia Bejenaru	(Spain) Lucía Cortez Llorca (Spain) Guiomar Maristany	4–6, 6–3, [6–10]
Loss	10–10	Sep 2023	ITF Varna, Bulgaria	W25	Clay	(Romania) Karola Patricia Bejenaru	(Italy) Lisa Pigato (Latvia) Daniela Vismane	6–7^{(4)}, 5–7
Loss	10–11	Sep 2023	ITF Santa Margherita di Pula, Italy	W25	Clay	(Italy) Miriana Tona	(Slovenia) Živa Falkner (Germany) Katharina Hobgarski	1–6, 2–6
Loss	10–12	Oct 2023	ITF Cherbourg-en-Cotentin, France	W25+H	Hard (i)	(Belgium) Lara Salden	(Poland) Martyna Kubka (Kazakhstan) Zhibek Kulambayeva	0–6, 3–6
Win	11–12	Oct 2023	ITF Sharm El Sheikh, Egypt	W25	Hard	(Romania) Karola Patricia Bejenaru	(Slovakia) Katarína Kužmová; Ekaterina Shalimova	6–2, 7–6^{(5)}
Loss	11–13	Nov 2023	ITF Funchal, Portugal	W40	Hard	(Portugal) Inês Murta	Anastasia Kovaleva; Elena Pridankina	2–6, 3–6
Loss	11–14	Jan 2024	ITF Monastir, Tunisia	W15	Hard	(Belgium) Tilwith Di Girolami	(Japan) Anri Nagata (Japan) Rinon Okuwaki	2–6, 6–7^{(5)}
Win	12–14	Jan 2024	ITF Monastir, Tunisia	W15	Hard	(France) Nina Radovanovic	(Slovakia) Nina Vargová (Slovakia) Radka Zelníčková	6–4, 6–2
Loss	12–15	Jan 2024	ITF Monastir, Tunisia	W35	Hard	(Romania) Oana Gavrilă	(Belgium) Ema Kovacevic (Belgium) Lara Salden	6–3, 1–6, [8–10]
Loss	12–16	Mar 2024	ITF Monastir, Tunisia	W15	Hard	(Serbia) Elena Milovanović	(Germany) Selina Dal (Poland) Gina Feistel	6–3, 4–6, [1–10]
Win	13–16	Apr 2024	ITF Hammamet, Tunisia	W35	Clay	(France) Emma Léné	(Italy) Gloria Ceschi (Italy) Giorgia Pinto	7–6^{(6)}, 7–6^{(2)}
Loss	13–17	Apr 2024	ITF Hammamet, Tunisia	W35	Clay	(Colombia) María Herazo González	(Spain) Kaitlin Quevedo (Japan) Ikumi Yamazaki	3–6, 6–7^{(5)}
Loss	13–18	Jun 2024	ITF La Marsa, Tunisia	W50	Hard	(Slovakia) Katarína Kužmová	Aglaya Fedorova; Kira Pavlova	7–6^{(3)}, 1–6, [3–10]
Win	14–18	Feb 2025	ITF Monastir, Tunisia	W15	Hard	(Serbia) Elena Milovanović	(India) Diva Bhatia (Greece) Sapfo Sakellaridi	6–2, 6–0
Loss	14–19	Mar 2025	ITF Terrassa, Spain	W35	Clay	Alina Charaeva	(Czech Republic) Aneta Kučmová (Germany) Caroline Werner	6–3, 1–6, [6–10]
Loss	14–20	Aug 2025	ITF Monastir, Tunisia	W15	Hard	(Serbia) Elena Milovanović	(Czech Republic) Alena Kovačková (Czech Republic) Jana Kovačková	6–7^{(2)}, 4–6
Win	15–20	Sep 2025	ITF Monastir, Tunisia	W35	Hard	(Serbia) Elena Milovanović	(Switzerland) Alina Granwehr (Italy) Arianna Zucchini	6–1, 6–1
Loss	15–21	Oct 2025	ITF Lagos, Portugal	W35	Hard	(Serbia) Elena Milovanović	(Italy) Vittoria Paganetti (France) Alice Tubello	5–7, 6–3, [4–10]
Loss	15–22	Jan 2026	ITF Monastir, Tunisia	W15	Hard	(Serbia) Elena Milovanović	Kristina Dmitruk; Daria Khomutsianskaya	5–7, 5–7
Win	16–22	Jan 2026	ITF Monastir, Tunisia	W50	Hard	(Serbia) Elena Milovanović	(Netherlands) Loes Ebeling Koning (Netherlands) Isis Louise van den Broek	6–2, 6–3
Win	17–22	Mar 2026	ITF Monastir, Tunisia	W35	Hard	(Slovakia) Katarína Kužmová	(Poland) Weronika Falkowska (United States) Hibah Shaikh	7–5, 7–6^{(5)}
Loss	17–23	May 2026	ITF Monastir, Tunisia	W35	Hard	(Serbia) Elena Milovanović	(Poland) Weronika Falkowska (Slovakia) Katarína Kužmová	4–6, 3–6
