= Valerie Camillo =

American sports executive

Valerie J. Camillo is an American sports executive. She is the chairperson of the Women's Tennis Association since 17 November 2025. Camillo was formerly President and CEO of Spectacor Sports & Entertainment, Comcast Spectacor's sports and entertainment division which includes the business operations of the Philadelphia Flyers and the Wells Fargo Center. Other roles she has held include Chief Revenue and Marketing officer for the Washington Nationals and Senior Vice President of the NBA's Team Marketing and Business Operations group.

== Early life and education ==
Camillo was born in northern Virginia to a father who worked in the defense industry. Prior to her maternal grandfather's death, he turned her into a fan of the New York Yankees and especially of their star catcher, Thurman Munson. She grew up in Oakton, Virginia and attended James Madison High School in Vienna, Virginia. Camillo stayed in Virginia for her post-secondary education; earning her Bachelor of Science degree in Commerce from the University of Virginia's McIntire School of Commerce and her M.B.A. from the Darden School of Business. During high school, she competed in basketball, softball, and lacrosse and continued playing in Intramural sports while earning her degrees.

== Career ==
After graduating from the University of Virginia Darden School of Business, Camillo spent a decade and a half working for consulting firms, PricewaterhouseCoopers, and Booz Allen Hamilton. In 2010, she left the firms to begin consulting the National Basketball Association as part of its Team Marketing and Business Operations Group. Four years later, Camillo was named chief revenue and marketing officer for the Washington Nationals. In this role, she was responsible for all revenue-generating departments, including ticketing, marketing, special events and corporate partnership. During her time with the Nationals, Camillo enacted various revenue-generating events including game themes, bobbleheads, fan giveaways and the Anheuser-Busch brews at the park. According to Forbes, she also helped the franchise bring in $304 million in revenue in 2017.

In 2018, Camillo was named by Comcast Spectacor as president of business operations for the Philadelphia Flyers and the Wells Fargo Center. In this role, she was expected to oversee all key business functions, including sales, marketing, analytics, technology and overall business optimization. Camillo said she was drawn to Philadelphia for the chance to oversee the arena's upgrades, including the installation of a 4K Kinetic scoreboard, new LED video and lighting systems and upgrades to the mezzanine, main concourse and suite levels. As the NHL began making an effort to combat racism and accelerate inclusion efforts, Camillo was elected to serve on their Executive Inclusion Council. In recognition of her efforts, Camillo was named a 2020 Women of Distinction. In June 2023, Camillo stepped down as CEO after one year in the role.

On 28 October 2025, the Women's Tennis Association announced that Camillo had been chosen to be its next chairperson, taking over from the retiring Steve Simon on 17 November that year.

== Personal life ==
Camillo and her husband Lawrence live in Philadelphia.
