= Aliona Falei =

Belarusian tennis player (born 2004)

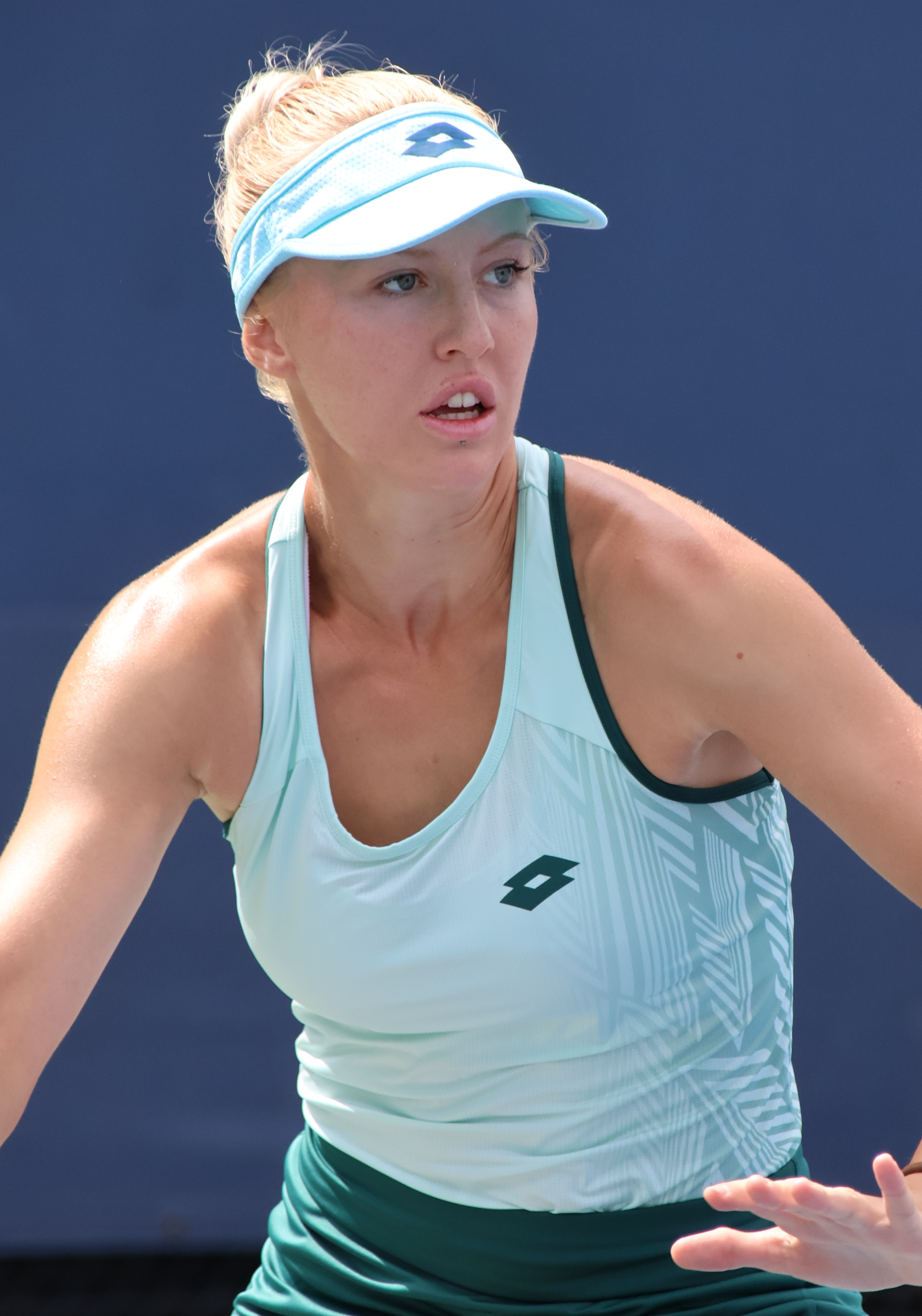
- Falei at the 2026 US Open
- Country (sports): Belarus
- Born: 29 March 2004 (age 22)
- Plays: Right (two-handed backhand)
- Prize money: $249,974

Singles
- Career record: 191–107
- Career titles: 8 ITF
- Highest ranking: No. 173 (27 May 2024)
- Current ranking: No. 222 (24 August 2026)

Grand Slam singles results
- Australian Open: Q1 (2025)
- French Open: Q1 (2024, 2026)
- US Open: Q1 (2024, 2026)

Doubles
- Career record: 59–40
- Career titles: 4 ITF
- Highest ranking: No. 349 (8 September 2025)
- Current ranking: No. 752 (24 August 2026)
- Last updated on: 29 August 2026.

Aliona Siarhiejeŭna Falei (Belarusian: Алёна Сяргееўна Фалей born 29 March 2004) is a Belarusian professional tennis player.

Falei has career-high WTA rankings of 173 in singles and 349 in doubles. She has won eight singles titles and four doubles titles on the ITF Circuit.

== Career ==
In 2022, she reached the final of the doubles tournament in Sharm El Sheikh, Egypt.

In September 2023, she won a W25 tournament in Ceuta, Spain. In December, she won the title at the W40 Keio Challenger in Japan defeating Ayano Shimizu in the final, in straight sets.

=== 2024 ===
In February, she achieved the biggest championship of her career at the W75 tournament in Grenoble, France where she defeated French Manon Léonard in the final.

In September, she advanced with her Russian partner Elena Pridankina to the semifinals of the Jasmin Open, held in Tunisia.

In October, she played in the final of the W50 tournament held in Kayseri, Turkey.

In December, she became champion in the Challenger tournament held in Yokohama, Japan and defended her title.

== ITF Circuit finals ==
=== Singles: 15 (8 titles, 7 runner-ups) ===
Legend W75 tournaments (1–0) W40/50 tournaments (2–2) W25/35 tournaments (4–3) W15 tournaments (1–2)	Finals by surface Hard (8–7)

Result	W–L	Date	Tournament	Tier	Surface	Opponent	Score
Loss	0–1	Sep 2021	ITF Monastir, Tunisia	W15	Hard	(China) Ma Yexin	4–6, 4–6
Loss	0–2	Oct 2022	ITF Sharm El Sheik, Egypt	W15	Hard	Darya Shauha	2–6, 6–7^{(3)}
Win	1–2	Nov 2022	ITF Sharm El Sheik, Egypt	W15	Hard	(Thailand) Mananchaya Sawangkaew	6–1, 7–5
Loss	1–3	Jul 2023	ITF Corroios-Seixal, Portugal	W25	Hard	(China) Gao Xinyu	2–6, 3–6
Loss	1–4	Aug 2023	ITF Astana, Kazakhstan	W25	Hard	Polina Iatcenko	3–6, 3–6
Loss	1–5	Sep 2023	ITF Nakhon Si Thammarat, Thailand	W25	Hard	Anastasia Zakharova	2–6, 4–6
Win	2–5	Sep 2023	ITF Ceuta, Spain	W25	Hard	(Serbia) Katarina Kozarov	6–1, 6–4
Win	3–5	Dec 2023	Yokohama Challenger, Japan	W40	Hard	(Japan) Ayano Shimizu	6–3, 7–5
Win	4–5	Feb 2024	Open de l'Isère, France	W75	Hard (i)	(France) Manon Léonard	6–1, 4–6, 6–4
Loss	4–6	Oct 2024	ITF Kayseri, Turkey	W50	Hard	(Kazakhstan) Zarina Diyas	6–0, 4–6, 3–6
Win	5–6	Dec 2024	Yokohama Challenger, Japan	W40	Hard	(United States) Hina Inoue	3–6, 6–1, 6–4
Win	6–6	Sep 2025	ITF Shenyang, China	W35	Hard (i)	(China) Liu Fangzhou	7–6^{(6)}, 7–5
Win	7–6	Mar 2026	ITF Monastir, Tunisia	W35	Hard	(Spain) Eva Guerrero Álvarez	4–6, 6–2, 6–4
Win	8–6	Mar 2026	ITF Monastir, Tunisia	W35	Hard	(United States) Hibah Shaikh	6–4, 6–2
Loss	8–7	Jun 2026	Guimarães Ladies Open, Portugal	W50	Hard	(United States) Savannah Broadus	6–1, 3–6, 4–6

=== Doubles: 8 (4 titles, 4 runner-ups) ===
Legend W50 tournaments (1–0) W25/35 tournaments (0–2) W15 tournaments (3–2)	Finals by surface Hard (3–4) Clay (1–0)

Result	W–L	Date	Tournament	Tier	Surface	Partner	Opponents	Score
Win	1–0	Dec 2021	ITF Cairo, Egypt	W15	Clay	Anastasia Zolotareva	(Kazakhstan) Yekaterina Dmitrichenko (Egypt) Sandra Samir	6–4, 6–2
Win	2–0	Sep 2022	ITF Sharm El Sheikh, Egypt	W15	Hard	(Georgia (country)) Nino Natsvlishvili	(Chinese Taipei) Chen Pei-hsuan (Chinese Taipei) Lin Fang-an	6–3, 6–4
Loss	2–1	Sep 2022	ITF Sharm El Sheikh	W15	Hard	(Egypt) Yasmin Ezzat	Aglaya Fedorova; Elena Pridankina	5–7, 1–6
Loss	2–2	Nov 2022	ITF Sharm El Sheikh	W15	Hard	Aglaya Fedorova	(Chinese Taipei) Cho I-hsuan (Chinese Taipei) Cho Yi-tsen	3–6, 6–3, [5–10]
Win	3–2	Apr 2023	ITF Sharm El Sheikh	W15	Hard	Polina Iatcenko	Evgeniya Burdina; Ekaterina Shalimova	6–4, 7–5
Loss	3–3	Nov 2023	ITF Monastir, Tunisia	W25	Hard	Polina Iatcenko	(China) Gao Xinyu (Kazakhstan) Zhibek Kulambayeva	0–6, 6–2, [7–10]
Loss	3–4	Apr 2025	ITF Sharm El Sheikh, Egypt	W35	Hard	Polina Iatcenko	(Slovakia) Katarína Kužmová; Mariia Tkacheva	4–6, 3–6
Win	4–4	Jun 2025	ITF Montemor-o-Novo, Portugal	W50	Hard	Polina Iatcenko	(Lithuania) Iveta Dapkutė (Poland) Weronika Ewald	6–3, 7–5
