= Disappearance of Peng Shuai =

2021 Chinese political incident

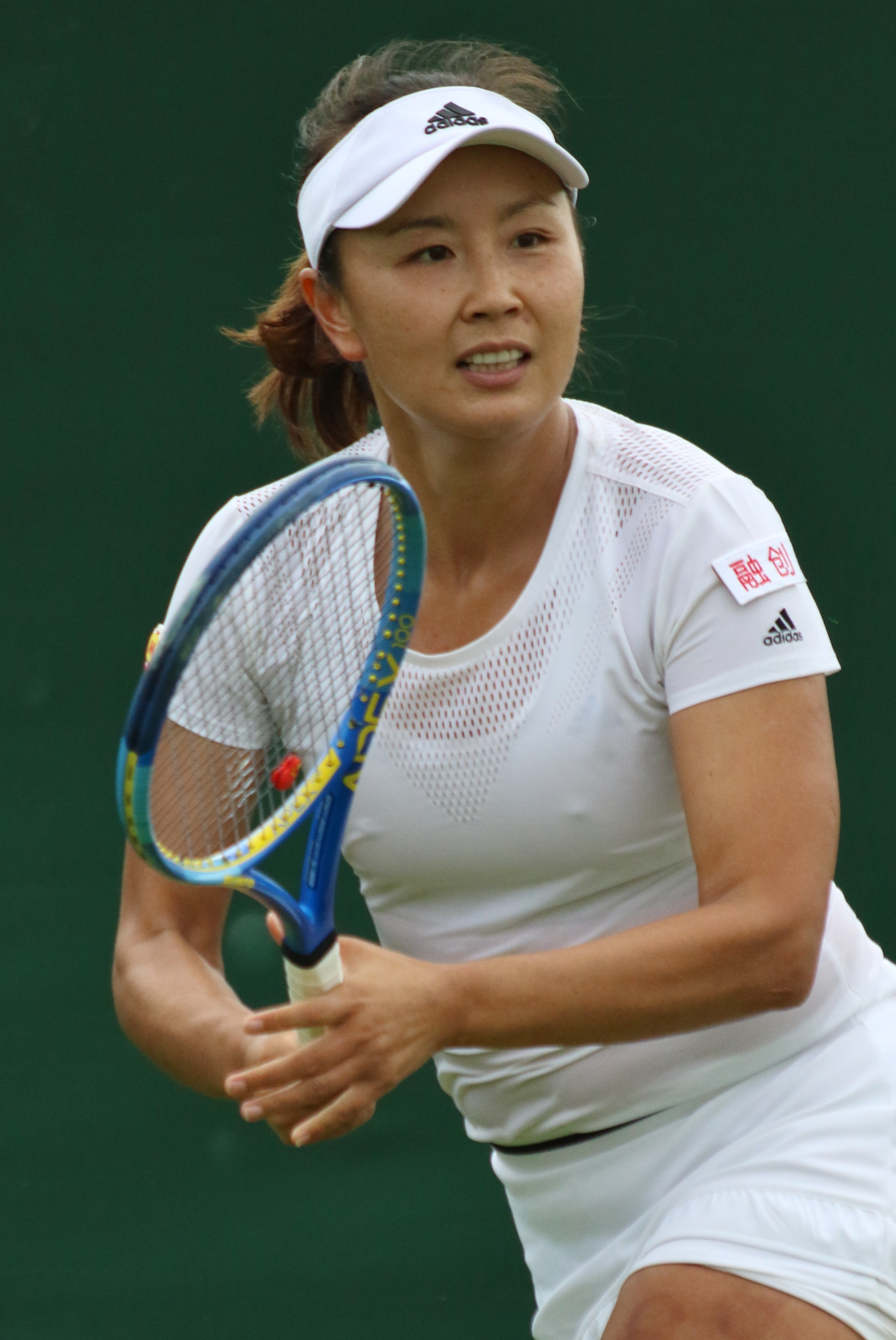
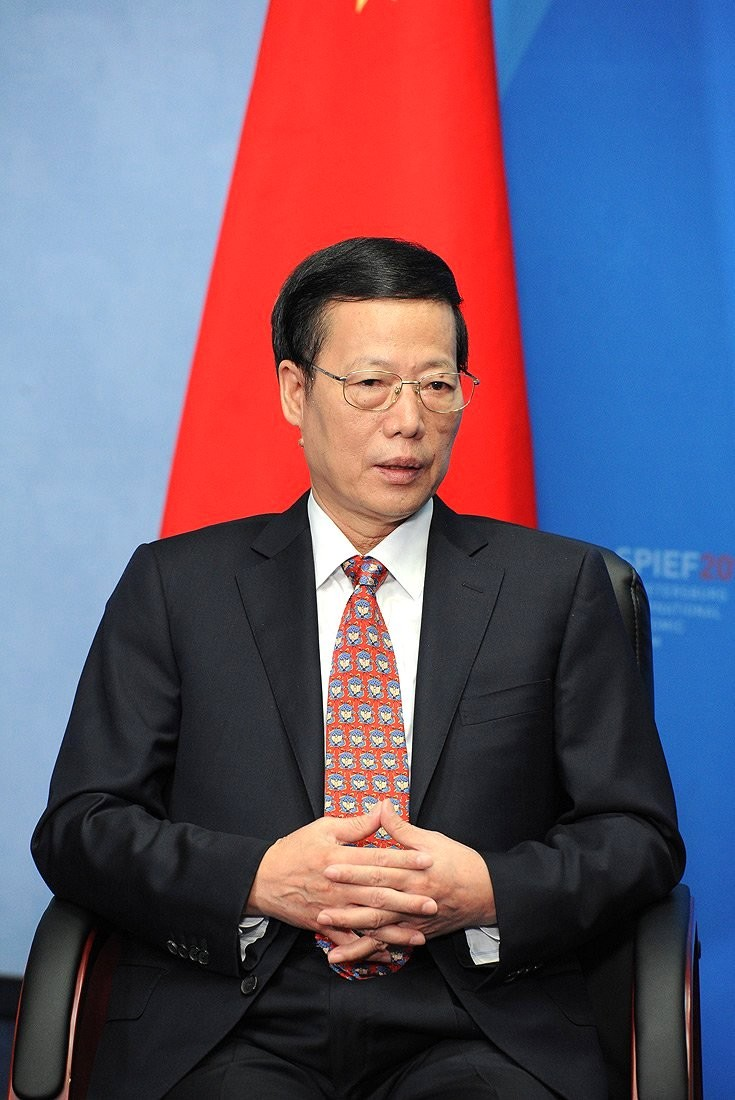
Peng Shuai in 2019 and Zhang Gaoli in 2013

On 2 November 2021, Chinese tennis player Peng Shuai posted on Weibo that she had been involved in an extramarital affair with retired Chinese Vice Premier Zhang Gaoli. She wrote that Zhang had pressed her to have sex with him three years earlier, and that their relationship had recently come to an end, but in the end agreed to have sex and renewed their relationship. Information about her story was censored by the Chinese government. Peng then disappeared until November 21, when she appeared at a tennis tournament in China on state media. She also wrote e-mails, and did interviews, in which she denied making accusations of sexual assault. The incident elicited international concern over her safety, whereabouts, and ability to communicate freely, and the Women's Tennis Association (WTA) suspended all its events in China. Peng was reportedly seen in public on a few occasions since the incident. Despite dissatisfaction with the status of the case, the WTA announced its return to the country in 2023 after it emerged from COVID-19 lockdowns.

== Background and allegation ==
On 2 November 2021, Peng posted a lengthy message on her Weibo account where, according to several media outlets, she accused Zhang Gaoli, a retired Chinese vice-premier and member of the Politburo Standing Committee (PSC) of the Chinese Communist Party (CCP), of forcing or pressuring her into sex three years previously. Deutsche Welle, SET News, and United Daily News provided screenshots of her post, where Peng mentioned another sexual encounter with him seven years or more earlier. Zhang, who was 40 years her senior, had pursued her first. Upon his appointment to the PSC, he stopped contacting her. Following his retirement which was three years before her post, Zhang and his wife brought Peng to their home after a tennis game. He wanted to be intimate with Peng, who cried and refused at first. After having supper with the couple and some further persuasion from Zhang, Peng relented and agreed to have sex because she still had feelings for him, even though she was also scared.

The incident rekindled their affair and Peng wrote that they would at times talk for hours, play chess and tennis, and "getting along so well that everything just felt right". Every time she visited Zhang, however, Peng suffered humiliation from his wife's verbal abuse. Zhang had said that while he loved Peng, divorcing his wife was politically impossible, and Peng lamented about the importance of title and status ("名分"). Following a dispute on 30 October, with Zhang seemingly about to "disappear" on her again, Peng came out with her account, despite not having made any audio or video recordings as evidence of her relationship with Zhang. According to Shannon Tiezzie of The Diplomat, unhappiness with the hidden nature of the relationship and repeated slights apparently caused Peng to post her story.

While Chinese authorities have charged officials in the past with sexual misconduct under corruption, this was the first time a member of the top echelon of the CCP has faced public allegations. Cindy Yu, writing for The Spectator, alleged that some of China's rich, successful men, including some party officials, have mistresses. She noted that since Xi Jinping’s anti-corruption campaign commenced in 2012, about 100,000 officials indicted have had an extramarital affair.

Peng's post drew attention to the #MeToo movement in China, which in 2021 saw the arrest of Kris Wu and the firing of a male Alibaba executive after widespread discussions online and criticism from state media. In contrast, all discussions about Peng came under censorship in China. Her post disappeared from Weibo within 20 minutes of being uploaded, although screenshots of it were saved. Despite this, knowledge of the news continued to circulate in some form in China, with #MeToo activist Zhou Xiaoxuan expressing sympathy for Peng.

== Disappearance and aftermath ==
Approximately 30 minutes after making the Weibo post, the post disappeared and references to Peng Shuai disappeared from China's internet. Peng stopped communicating on social media. When asked about her whereabouts on 3 November, foreign ministry spokesman Wang Wenbin said, "I have not heard of the issue you raised. This is not a diplomatic question". On 17 November, reporters put the question to another foreign ministry spokesperson, Zhao Lijian, who replied that the matter was not a diplomatic issue and suggested that the reporter contact the "relevant department". Hu Xijin, editor-in-chief of the CCP-owned tabloid Global Times tweeted, "As a person who is familiar with Chinese system, I don't believe Peng Shuai has received retaliation and repression speculated by foreign media for the thing people talked about". Commentators seized upon the vague, deflective wording in Hu's tweet, and noted that the Global Times has not covered the accusations against the former vice-premier at all.

On 14 November, WTA chief executive Steve Simon called on Chinese authorities to investigate Peng's allegations and stop censoring the subject. The state-affiliated Chinese Tennis Association responded with a statement that Peng was safe and not under any physical threat. Simon said that no one associated with the WTA, including officials and active players, had been able to reach her directly to confirm her status. ATP chairman Andrea Gaudenzi also expressed concern about the uncertainty surrounding Peng's immediate safety and whereabouts. He offered full support for WTA's investigation into Peng's allegations and said that the ATP would continue to monitor the situation closely. On 12 November, the hashtag #WhereIsPengShuai was first used, and went on to trend globally. On 15 November, tennis player Novak Djokovic expressed his shock at Peng's disappearance in comments to reporters after winning his ATP Finals opener. On 16 November, tennis player Naomi Osaka posted a message on Twitter demanding answers about Peng's whereabouts and her sexual allegation. Tennis players Serena Williams, Andy Murray, and Billie Jean King expressed their concerns as well about Peng's alleged disappearance. Djokovic said the incident was "shocking" and Osaka said "Censorship is never OK at any cost." On 21 November, Roger Federer and Rafael Nadal voiced concern for Peng. On 15 November, Jon Wertheim of Sports Illustrated wrote that the "2008 Beijing Games that were supposed to liberalize China made its regime only more brazen in rejecting liberal democracy and human rights" and called for the cancellation of all tournaments in China until the whereabouts of Peng had been ascertained. He suggested that the Tour cut ties with China to make a statement before the Winter Olympics that "Our athletes' safety and our moral principles—our belief in women's rights, human rights and democracy—matter more than our balance sheets."

=== #WhereIsPengShuai hashtag ===
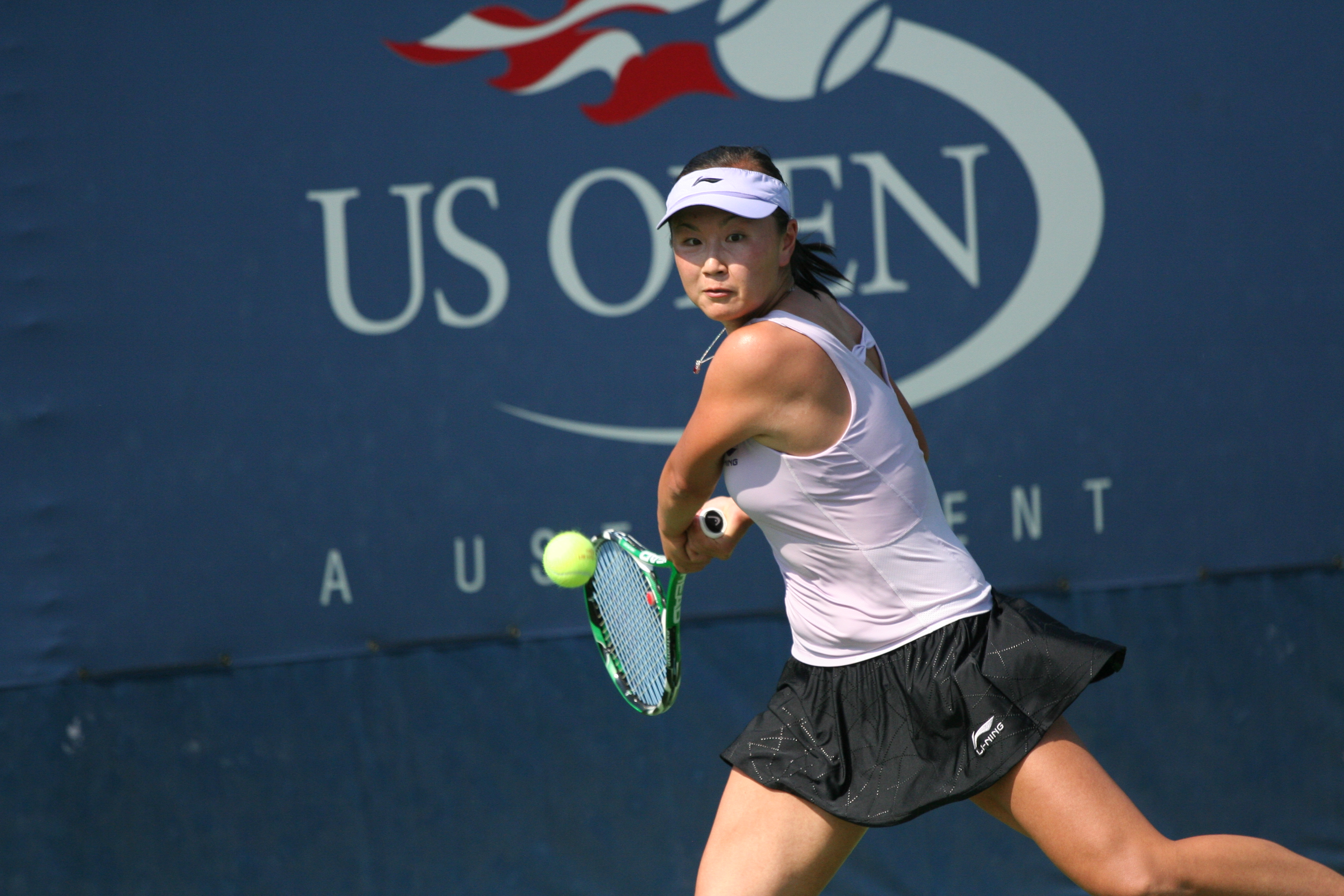
Peng Shuai at the 2010 US Open

#WhereIsPengShuai (Where is Peng Shuai?) is a hashtag, used mainly in social media, and a grassroots campaign to raise awareness about the disappearance of Peng Shuai. The hashtag first appeared on Twitter on November 12, 2021. The next day, French professional tennis player Alizé Cornet tweeted, "Let's not remain silent #WhereIsPengShuai". The hashtag was then quickly picked up and used by the tennis community and others to call attention to the disappearance of Peng Shuai. Among those who did this in the following couple of days were Chris Evert, Nicolas Mahut, Petra Kvitova, Simona Halep, Naomi Osaka, Stan Wawrinka and Serena Williams.

==== Australian Open ====
During the 2022 Australian Open, on 22 January, fans wearing t-shirts with the slogan "Where is Peng Shuai?" were asked to remove their shirts. A police officer at the scene was recorded saying, "The Australian Open does have a rule that you can't have political slogans ... it's a rule that it's a condition of entry." Tennis Australia backed up the police response. Later, Martina Navratilova stated, "I find it really, really cowardly. I think they are wrong on this. This is not a political statement, this is a human rights statement."

After an international outcry, Tennis Australia chief Craig Tiley reversed the decision and said fans are free to wear the t-shirts. However, signs on poles or "mobs" would not be allowed.

In response to the t-shirt controversy, a Chinese spokesman said, "The politicisation of sports will not succeed and will not gain support from the majority of people, including sportsmen and women, in the international community."

==== Multilingual use of the hashtag ====
The hashtag appeared as #OùEstPengShuai in French media and #DondeEstaPengShuai in Spanish media.

==== China's response to the hashtag ====
The name Peng Shuai was censored in China within 30 minutes of a social media post authored by Peng Shuai accusing former vice premier Zhang Gaoli of sexual assault. It is therefore assumed the hashtag, #WhereIsPengShuai remains unknown to Chinese citizens.

=== Emails, photos, and videos ===
On 17 November, Chinese state media outlet China Global Television Network released an email allegedly written by Peng to Simon, in which she said she was resting at home and that her allegation of sexual assault was not true. The email also criticized the WTA for releasing what she called unverified information about Peng without her consent. Many noted that a typing cursor appears to be visible on the screenshot of the email and doubted the authenticity of the email. Responding in regard to the email, Simon stated that it only raised his concerns as to her safety and whereabouts. He reiterated that Peng's sexual assault allegation must be investigated "with full transparency and without censorship". He also threatened to withdraw WTA tournaments in China until sexual assault allegations made by Peng are properly addressed. Mareike Ohlberg of the German Marshall Fund felt that the purported email was "not meant to convince people but to intimidate". The International Tennis Federation later said in a statement that it was committed to player safety and supports an investigation into the whereabouts of Peng. Meanwhile, the International Olympic Committee (IOC) said in a statement that they had "seen the latest reports and are encouraged by assurances that she is safe". In contrast to the IOC's quiet diplomacy, Tony Estanguet, the president of the 2024 Summer Olympics, has called for the "greatest transparency" regarding the health and safety of Peng. Amnesty International called on China to prove that Peng is safe and to investigate the sexual assault allegations against Zhang. On 19 November, the spokesperson of the UN High Commissioner for Human Rights Liz Throssell called on China to provide proof of her whereabouts and wellbeing, and urged for an investigation with full transparency into her sexual assault allegations.

On the same day, Chinese state media reporter Shen Shiwei shared screenshots of a WeChat thread of what he alleged to be Peng's chats with her friend, which consisted of three photos of Peng posing with her cat and stuffed animals including Winnie-the-Pooh. The cartoon character was blocked by online censors after it was used as a meme for Xi Jinping, but Pooh Bear merchandise can still be purchased in China.

On 20 November, Hu Xijin posted videos on his Twitter page showing Peng at a restaurant. He stated that she was staying in her own home freely and did not want to be disturbed in the past few days. Hu added that Peng would reappear and participate in public activities soon. He later shared videos showing her at the opening ceremony of the Fila Kids Junior Tennis Challenger Finals in Beijing. Hu tweeted, "Can any girl fake such sunny smile under pressure? Those who suspect Peng Shuai is under duress, how dark they must be inside. There must be many, many forced political performances in their countries." His newspaper also started to frame Peng's situation "as an ideological struggle between China and the west". China's foreign ministry spokesman said, "I hope certain people will cease malicious hyping, let alone politicisation". After the French embassy in Beijing posted about Peng on its Weibo account, the censors did not take down the post. However, they prioritized comments of "mind your own business" and about the French Catholic Church's sexual abuse of children. Cindy Yu wrote in The Spectator that one of these videos "even starts with a director off-screen cueing Peng's coach to start talking". Overall Chinese state media have "focused on her smiles and apparent good-spirits" and have not mentioned Peng's sexual assault allegation. According to Maria Repnikova, director of the Center for Global Information Studies at Georgia State University, they appear to be deploying the "familiar tactic of bypassing critiques or questions by underscoring western hypocrisy". The New York Times and ProPublica analyzed and identified 97 accounts promoting messages about Peng from the Global Times and other Chinese state media. They have since been removed by Twitter.

=== IOC calls and WTA suspension ===
On 21 November, the IOC said Peng had spoken to Thomas Bach, Emma Terho and Li Lingwei in a video call and said she "is safe and well, living at her home in Beijing, but would like to have her privacy respected at this time." The IOC did not publish the video. The WTA said that "It was good to see Peng Shuai in recent videos, but they don't alleviate or address the WTA's concern about her well-being and ability to communicate without censorship or coercion", requesting that she either be allowed to leave the country or speak live via teleconference with Steve Simon and no one else present. The WTA called for an investigation into Peng's sexual assault allegation, which, it said, was "the issue that gave rise to our initial concern". Nikki Dryden, a human rights lawyer and former Olympic swimmer for Canada, suggested that this was an IOC "media exercise" designed to allay growing threats of diplomatic boycotts for the 2022 Winter Olympics, saying "I'm so relieved she's alive, but the execution of this proof-of-life video is really troubling from a safeguarding perspective". Elaine Pearson, the Australia director of Human Rights Watch, said "Frankly, it is shameful to see the IOC participating in this Chinese government's charade that everything is fine and normal for Peng Shuai. Clearly it is not, otherwise why would the Chinese government be censoring Peng Shuai from the internet in China and not letting her speak freely to media or the public." Maya Wang, senior China researcher at Human Rights Watch (HRW), said "What we have here is essentially a state-controlled narrative: only the government and its affiliated media are generating and distributing the content about Peng's story. While it is possible that Peng is well, the history of the Chinese government disappearing people and then making videos of them to prove that they are unharmed when it is, in fact, the opposite, should make us worried about Peng's safety." In The Strategist published by the Australian Strategic Policy Institute, OSINT journalist Tom Jarvis writes that despite "unanswered questions about Peng's situation", events "may have been staged to ease international pressure on the China Open and the government".

On 30 November, a European Union spokesman said "the EU joins growing international demands, including by sport professionals, for assurances that she is free and not under threat. In this spirit, the EU requests that the Chinese government provide verifiable proof of Peng Shuai's safety, well-being and whereabouts". On December 1, 2021, Dick Pound, a longtime member of the International Olympic Committee, stated that the unanimous conclusion by the people who have been on a call with Peng Shuai is that she is fine.

On that same day, the Women's Tennis Association announced that they would suspend all tournaments in mainland China and Hong Kong. Michael Caster, co-founder of the human rights watchdog Safeguard Defenders, which monitors disappearances in China, said "the Women's Tennis Association has more credibility right now than Interpol in pushing back on China's gross human rights abuses, abduction of members of its organisation, and poking holes in what is just thinly-veiled coercive statements and propaganda". Erin Hale of Al Jazeera contrasted the WTA's concern over Peng with the muted response of Interpol during the disappearance of its former chief Meng Hongwei, where the organization had accepted his resignation letter and did not investigate Meng's whereabouts due to internal rules.

On 2 December, the International Olympic Committee reported that it held a second call with Peng the day before, where she reportedly reconfirmed that she is safe and well, given the difficult situation she is in. The IOC did not provide any pictures or videos of the call. IOC spokesman Mark Adams said, "We can't provide you with absolute certainty on anything. All we can do is do the best we can in the process that we believe is in the best interests of the well-being of the athlete." The WTA received an e-mail purportedly from Peng who "expressed her shock for WTA's unfair decision to suspend all tournaments in China."

On 6 December, the Global Times posted an editorial on Twitter in English, accusing the WTA of "expanding its influence in a speculative way, bringing politics into women's tennis deeply, setting a bad example for the entire sporting world" while omitting the WTA's reason for pulling out of China. It wasn't posted on Chinese-language social media. Xiao Qiang, editor-in-chief of the China Digital Times based in Berkeley, said "China's external propaganda on this matter is like a paper box that cannot hold water in front of its own people", observing that China's social media platforms have been completely silent about Peng and the WTA instead of the characteristic nationalistic attacks on parties that are deemed to have "offended China" since the sexual assault allegations would be politically damaging to the Communist Party. David Bandurski, director of the China Media Project, said "We could talk here about a two-pronged strategy, about how China has enforced complete silence at home while pushing a narrative externally about meddling journalists and the politicizing of sport. But to call it a strategy at all suggests a sophistication that is not really there. What we actually see is desperation, the editor-in-chief of one state-run newspaper rushing out on Twitter and banging his dishpan."

=== Interviews ===
On 19 December, Singaporean Chinese-language newspaper Lianhe Zaobao published a six-minute video of its interview with Peng and provided subtitles in English. In the video, which showed her and former athletes, such as Yao Ming, at an International Ski Federation cross-country skiing event in Shanghai, Peng said that she has been "staying at home" and has "always been free". She also stated in Mandarin, "I have never said or written that anyone has sexually assaulted me, I have to clearly stress this point ... with regards to Weibo, it's about my personal privacy ... There's been a lot of misunderstanding ... There [should be] no distorted interpretation", adding that the state media translation of her November email to Simon denying allegations of sexual assault was accurate. In response to the video, the WTA released a statement saying "We remain steadfast in our call for a full, fair and transparent investigation, without censorship, into her allegation of sexual assault." An anonymous China watcher said in the Asia Sentinel that the Chinese government or the CCP was behind the interview and that Zhang would face punishment after the Winter Olympics. When interviewed by The Washington Post, a number of Zaobao journalists stated that they believed that the Chinese government had chosen the paper "to promulgate the party line" while being "seen as more likely to be trusted by global audiences than a Chinese state media outlet".

Experts offered various interpretations afterward. One view was that although not stated explicitly, what Peng experienced was sexual assault from someone at a higher position. Another view was that although resonating with many readers, her original post was ambiguous, and sex happened only after she agreed to it. The question of whether her consent was valid is complicated by the pressure she might have felt as well as her love for Zhang during their affair.

On February 7, 2022, Peng participated in what The Washington Post called a "carefully managed" interview with French sports newspaper L'Équipe. An official with the Chinese Olympic Committee accompanied and interpreted for her, but the newspaper also had its own translator. Peng announced her retirement from competitive tennis and said there had been "a huge misunderstanding" surrounding her accusation of Zhang, her disappearance from the Chinese internet, and her well-being, reiterating "I never said anyone sexually assaulted me". She hoped that the meaning of her Weibo post is no longer be skewed and said that she erased it. "I was to say first of all that emotions, sport and politics are three clearly separate things. My romantic problems, my private life, should not be mixed with sport and politics." Peng added, echoing a government talking point. French newspaper Le Monde noted that Wang Kan asked to review the questions in advance, and that the interview had to be published as-is without any additional comments from the two journalists who interviewed Peng. Marc Ventouillac, one of the two interviewers, voiced his doubts about Peng Shuai's freedom and said that the interview had been part of "propaganda" efforts to downplay the issue. He also noted that Peng appeared to be healthy and that they were able to ask questions beyond those originally submitted with none of the questions being censored.

Peng was reportedly seen attending several events at the 2022 Winter Olympics. She also had a meeting with Thomas Bach and other IOC officials, where Peng said she intended to travel to Europe after the COVID-19 pandemic. In regards to questions of whether Peng is speaking freely or is under duress, IOC spokesman Mark Adams said "I don't think it's for us to be able to judge, in one way, just as it's not for you to judge either." Her appearances at the Games and references to her "accusation" remain censored inside China.

=== WTA lifts suspension ===
In April 2023, it was announced that the suspension will be lifted and WTA tournaments will continue in Shenzhen, China in September, after WTA stated that the issue was not likely to be resolved and explained their decision that if they didn't lift the suspension, it would be their "players and tournaments who ultimately will be paying an extraordinary price for their sacrifices". WTA also stated that they have maintained communication with the people close to Peng and are given assurances that "she is living safely with her family in Beijing". According to an article in NYT, the WTA ban was more symbolic rather than "substantive" considering that due to their official protocols for the COVID-19 pandemic, China itself had virtually canceled all international and domestic sporting events in both 2021 and 2022, due to the strict lockdown policy, and so even without the WTA suspension, there would have likely been no WTA tour events for 2022 anyway. The Guardian wrote that WTA had "returned at the first opportunity" when they knew China was allowing tennis tours to commence in 2023 and "the power of money has won out again".

In April 2026, Peng was spotted at a pickleball event in Beijing.

== See also ==
- Zhao Wei
