= Women's Tennis Association =

International organization for women's tennis

- Sport: Professional tennis
- Abbreviation: WTA
- Founded: June 1973; 53 years ago
- Location: Charlotte, North Carolina, U.S.
- Chairperson: (United States) Valerie Camillo
- CEO: (United States) Portia Archer

Official website
- www.wtatennis.com
- Current season: 2026 WTA Tour

The Women's Tennis Association (WTA) is the principal organizing body of women's professional tennis. The association governs the WTA Tour, which is the worldwide professional tennis tour for women. The WTA was founded to create a better future for women's tennis. The WTA's corporate headquarters is in St. Petersburg, Florida, with its European headquarters in London and its Asia-Pacific headquarters in Beijing.

The Women's Tennis Association was founded in June 1973 by Billie Jean King, Its origins trace back to the inaugural Virginia Slims tournament, which was arranged by Gladys Heldman, sponsored by Joe Cullman, CEO of Philip Morris, and held on 23 September 1970 at the Houston Racquet Club in Houston, Texas. Rosie Casals won this first event.

When the Women's Tennis Association was founded, Billie Jean King was one of nine players that comprised the WTA, also referred to as the Original 9, that included Julie Heldman, Valerie Ziegenfuss, Judy Dalton, Kristy Pigeon, Peaches Bartkowicz, Kerry Melville Reid, Nancy Richey, and Rosie Casals. Today, the WTA has more than 2,500 players from nearly 100 countries competing for $146 million in prize money.

== History ==
=== Background ===
Tennis's Open Era, in which professional players were allowed to compete alongside amateurs, began in 1968. The first Open Tournament was the British Hard Court Championships in Bournemouth. Later that year, at the first Open Wimbledon, the prize fund difference was 2.5:1 in favor of men. Billie Jean King, a high ranking tennis player in the late 1960s who won several titles, won £750 for taking the title, whilst Rod Laver won £2,000. The total prize pool of both competitions were £14,800 and £5,680 for men and women, respectively. The tournaments that did not want to provide prize money eventually faded out of the calendar, including the US Eastern Grass Court circuit with stops at Merion Cricket Club and Essex county club.

The women were being squeezed financially because we had no control in a male-dominated sport. Men owned, ran and promoted the tournaments, and because many of them were former players themselves, their sympathies lay with the male players, who argued vociferously that most of the money should be theirs.

— King and Starr on the gender pay gap within tennis, from their book "We Have Come a Long Way" (1988)

There were two professional tennis circuits in existence at the start of the Open Era: World Championship Tennis (WCT), which was for men only, and the National Tennis League (NTL). Ann Jones, Rosie Casals, Françoise Dürr, and Billie Jean King joined the NTL. King was paid $40,000 a year, Jones was paid $25,000, and Casals and Durr were paid $20,000 each. The group played established tournaments, such as the US Open and Wimbledon, and also organized their own tournaments, playing in the South of France for two months. The International Tennis Federation (ITF) then imposed several sanctions on the group. Women were not allowed to play in the Wightman Cup in 1968 and 1969 and the USLTA refused to include Casals and King in their rankings for those years. In 1969, ratios of 5:1 in terms of pay between men and women were common at smaller tournaments. By 1970, these figures had increased to up to 12:1. The International Lawn Tennis Federation (ILTF) had begun dropping several women's competitions from the tournaments it presided over, having sanctioned 15 men-only tournaments in 1970, all of which had previously been combined events.

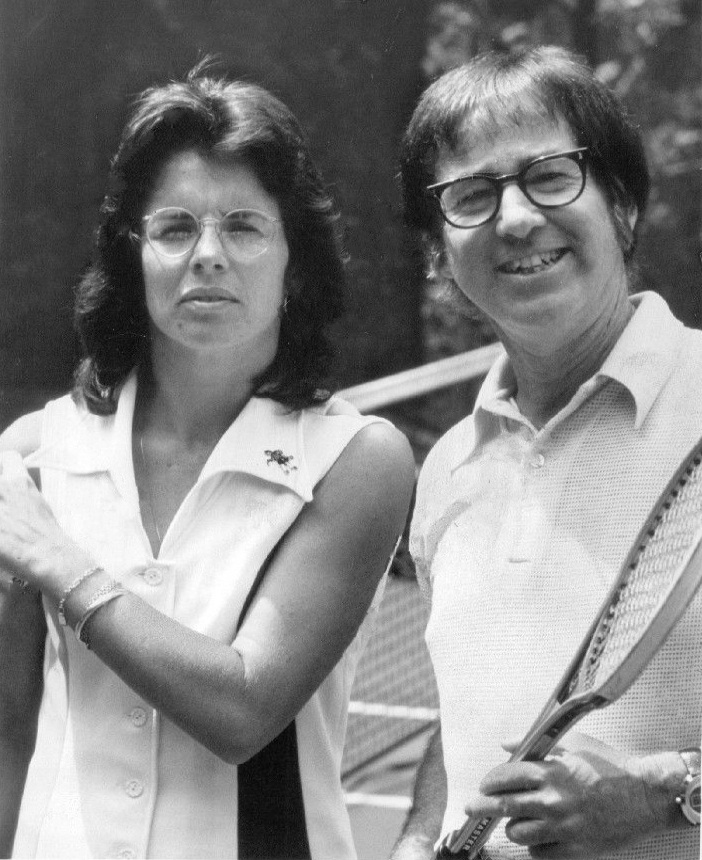
Billie Jean King and Bobby Riggs in 1973, the same year King founded WTA

The turning point for women's pay inequality came prior to the 1970 US Open. The Pacific Southwest Championships, directed by Jack Kramer, had announced a 12:1 ratio in the prize money difference between what men and women would win. This tournament provoked the top 9 female tennis players—Billie Jean King, Julie Heldman, Valerie Ziegenfuss, Judy Dalton, Kristy Pigeon, Peaches Bartkowicz, Kerry Melville Reid, Nancy Richey, and Rosie Casals, now known as the Original 9—to take a stand for equality. They did not play in the Los Angeles tournament; instead, wanted to create their own tennis tournament.

Several female players contacted Gladys Heldman, publisher of World Tennis Magazine, and stated that they wanted to boycott the event. Although Heldman advised against it, she did help them put together their own tournament in Houston which would not take place until after the US Open. The 1970 Houston Women's Invitation for nine women players was formed. Heldman was friends with Joseph Cullman, CEO and chairman of Phillip Morris, who secured the new tournament. The tournament was a success and later sponsored by Virginia Slims in 1971.

=== WTA Tour ===
The WTA was founded at a meeting organized by Billie Jean King, a week before the 1973 Wimbledon Championships, as a direct response to the formation of the Association of Tennis Professionals, a year prior. This meeting was held at Gloucester Hotel in London and featured 70 other female players, where King was named the first president of the organization. In 1975, the WTA increased its financial stature by signing a television broadcast contract with CBS, the first in the WTA's history.

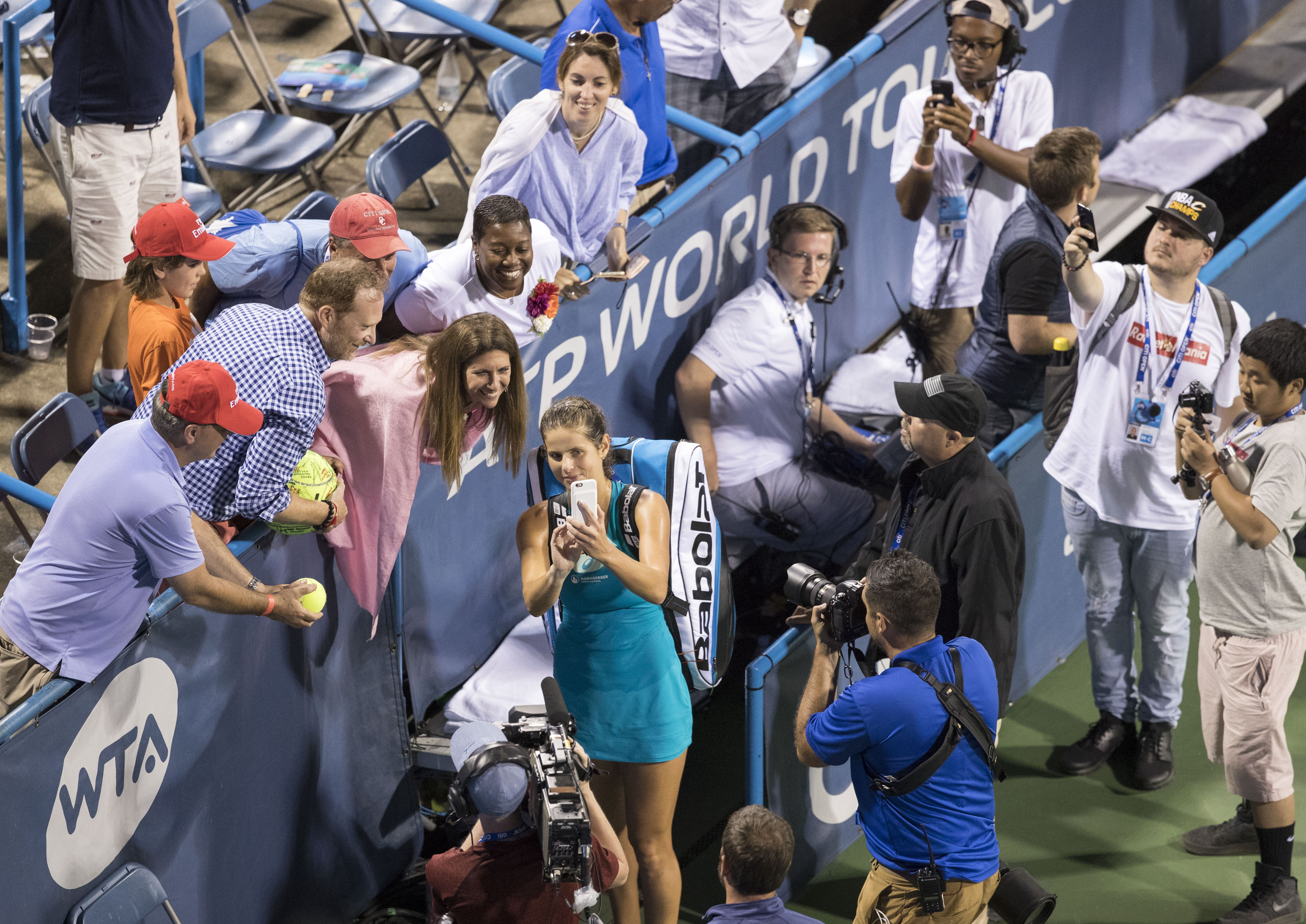
Television, streaming, and social media would help connect the sport of tennis with more people around the world.

In 1976, Colgate assumed sponsorship of the circuit from April to November, with Avon replacing Virginia Slims as the sponsor of the winter circuit the following year. The Colgate Series—renamed the Toyota Series in 1981—included tournaments in all parts of the world, whereas the Avon sponsored events took place solely in the US. The two circuits merged at the beginning of the 1983 season when Virginia Slims returned to take full sponsorship rights of the WTA Tour. Every tournament under the administration of the WTA became part of the Virginia Slims World Championship Series, before becoming the WTA World Tour in 1995 after the WTA Players Association merged with the Women's Tennis Council.

In 1977, women's tennis was the first professional sport opened to transgender women. The New York Supreme Court ruled in favour of Renée Richards, a player who underwent male-to-female sex reassignment surgery. Eligibility of transgender players is officially regulated under the current WTA official rulebook.

In July 2026, the WTA introduced a new women's eligibility policy requiring players to undergo a one-time test for the presence of the SRY gene. A negative result generally established eligibility for the women's category, while a positive result prompted further medical assessment. The WTA said that testing information would be handled confidentially and that the policy was intended to maintain equal athletic opportunities and fair competition.

==== WTA Tour tournaments ====
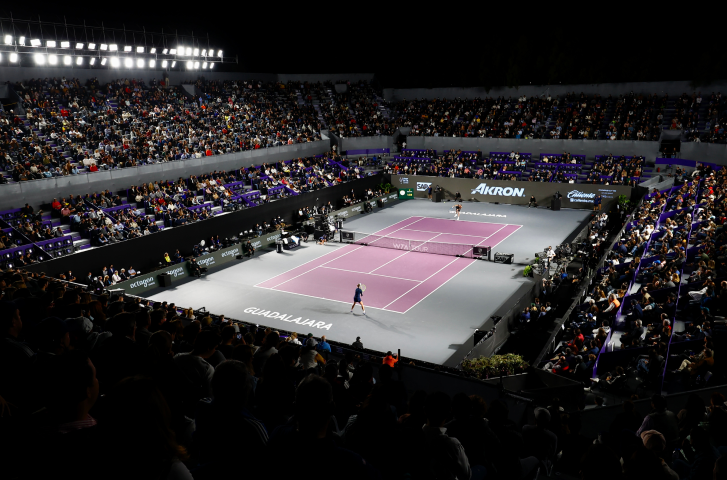
WTA 1000 in Guadalajara

In 2024, the WTA made all WTA 1000 events mandatory. The WTA Elite Trophy did not return:

- Grand Slam tournaments (4)
- Year-ending WTA Finals (1)
- WTA 1000 tournaments: Ten events with prize money ranging from US$2 million to US$10 million.
- WTA 500 tournaments: 17 events with prize money from US$700,000 to US$900,000.
- WTA 250 tournaments: 22 events, with prize money around US$250,000.
- WTA 125 tournaments 30 events with prize money around US$115,000.

Since 2012 (number of events varies each year; in 2018 there were ten tournaments: four in United States, two in China and one each in Croatia, France, India and Taiwan), with prize money for the four events in United States at US$150,000 and at the other events at around US$125,000.

Ranking points are also available at tournaments on the ITF Women's Circuit organized by the International Tennis Federation, which comprises several hundred tournaments each year with prize funds ranging from US$15,000 to US$100,000.

== Management ==
WTA's 2010–2020 logo

WTA's 2020–2025 logo

American sports entrepreneur Jerry Diamond (1928–1996) served as executive director of the women's association from 1974 to 1985. He was instrumental in negotiating business deals with Avon, Colgate-Palmolive, and Toyota, and worked out the deal that made Virginia Slims the titular sponsor of the WTA tour.

Larry Scott became chairman and CEO of the WTA on 16 April 2003. While at the WTA, Scott put together the largest sponsorship in the history of women's sports, a six-year, $88 million sponsorship deal with Sony Ericsson. On 24 March 2009, Scott announced that he was resigning as WTA chief to take up a new position as the commissioner of the Pac-10 Conference, on 1 July 2009.

Scott pointed to Korn Ferry to headhunt his replacement but "with no decision made" on 13 July 2009, WTA Tour announced the appointment of Stacey Allaster, the Tour's president since 2006, as the new chairman and CEO of the WTA. Allaster was named as one of the "Most Powerful Women in Sports" by Forbes Magazine and led the WTA through significant growth and under her leadership, she secured a media agreement that would maximise fan exposure to women's tennis globally. During her time with the WTA, she generated an estimated $1 billion in diversified contract revenues, built the brand globally, and was a strong advocate for gender equality. She announced her retirement as chief executive of the WTA on 22 September 2015 citing a personal change in priorities.

On 5 October 2015, Steve Simon, the Tournament Director of the BNP Paribas Open, was announced to succeed Stacey as the new WTA chairman and CEO.

In December 2021, following Peng Shuai's disappearance by the Chinese government, the WTA under Steve Simon suspended its operations in China and Hong Kong. The boycott was lifted in 2023 after 16 months, citing financial losses due to the suspension of operations in China as well as the COVID-19 pandemic.

In March 2022, medical technology firm Hologic reached an agreement to become title sponsor and "official health partner" of the WTA Tour, marking its first title sponsorship agreement since the expiration of the previous Sony Ericsson deal.

On 28 October 2025, it was announced that Valerie Camillo had been chosen to be the next chairperson, taking over from the retiring Steve Simon on 17 November of that year.

=== Players' Council ===
The Players' Council is a group or sub-committee under the WTA board of directors, consisting of eight selected players on the tour that advocate player interest, handles grievances, changes in the tennis schedule and other concerns.

2024–25 Players' Council

- 1–20 Ranking Category: Victoria Azarenka, Caroline Garcia, Jessica Pegula, Maria Sakkari
- 21–50 Ranking Category: Donna Vekić
- 51–100 Ranking Category: Daria Saville
- 21+ Ranking Category: Gabriela Dabrowski (Note: Members in the position for 21+ Ranking Category and 101+ Ranking Category also act as "Doubles-only" representatives on the Players' Council.)
- 101+ Ranking Category: Ellen Perez
- Notes

== Growth milestones ==
=== Prize money ===
When Avon began sponsoring the winter circuit in 1976, the largest prize fund offered for a single tournament was $100,000—for the Avon Championships. In 1984, The Australian Open joined the US Open in offering women equal prize money, but temporarily did not between 1996 and 2000. After a 30-year campaign, 2007 marked the historic achievement of equal prize money at Roland Garros and Wimbledon. This meant all four major tournaments offered parity. In 1973, the US Open tennis tournament became the first Grand Slam tournament to award the same prize money for women as men. The Australian Open would become the second Grand Slam offering equal prize money following suit in 1985 although the tournament awarded men more money from 1996 to 2000 before equal prize money returned in 2001. The French Open offered equal prize money for champions in 2006. In 2007 both Wimbledon and the French Open both offered equal prize money.

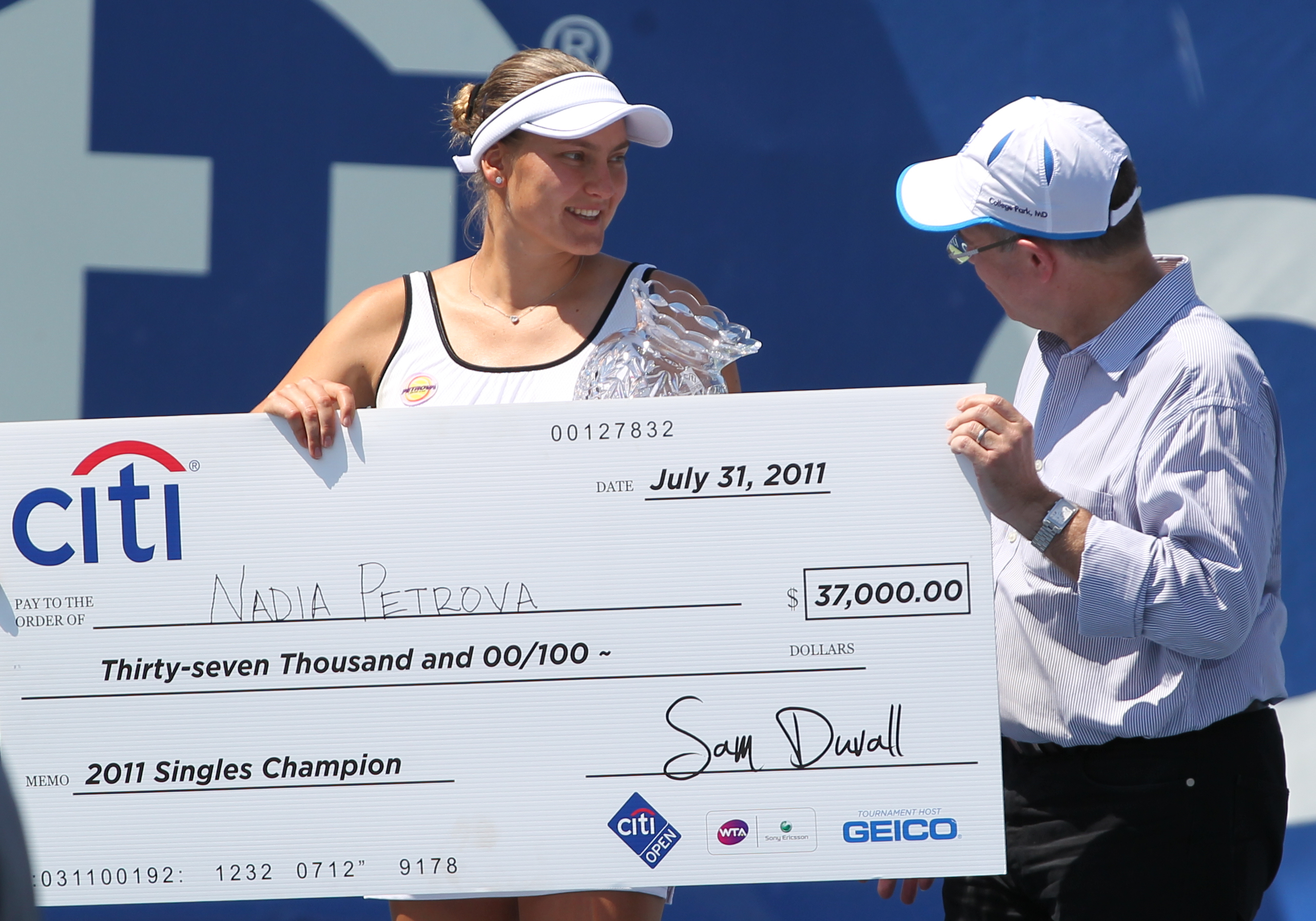
As the sport has grown over the years, more sponsorships help to keep the sport viable.

The WTA circuit continued to expand during these years. In 1971, King became the first female athlete to surpass $100,000 in earnings for a single year. Chris Evert became the first female athlete to win over $1,000,000 in career earnings in 1976. By 1980, over 250 women were playing professionally, and the circuit consisted of 47 global events, offering a total of $7.2 million in prize money. These increased financial opportunities allowed for groundbreaking developments not only in tennis, but across women's sports.

In 1982, Martina Navratilova became the first to win over $1,000,000 in a single year. Navratilova's single year earnings exceeded $2 million in 1984. In 1997, Martina Hingis became the first to earn over $3 million during a single year. In 2003, Kim Clijsters surpassed $4 million in earnings for a single year. In 2006, Venus Williams and the WTA pushed for equal prize money at both the French Open and Wimbledon. Both of these Grand Slam events relented in 2007 and awarded equal money for the first time. This enabled Justine Henin, who won the French Open in 2007, to earn over $5 million that year, becoming the first woman in sports to do this. In 2009, Serena Williams went over the six million mark by earning over $6.5 million in a single year. Then in 2012 both Serena Williams and Victoria Azarenka became the first players to exceed $7 million in prize money in a single season. In 2013 Serena Williams went over the twelve million dollar mark, winning $12,385,572 in a single year.

=== Sponsorship ===
On 10 December 2025, the WTA Tour signed the largest sponsorship deal in the organization's history with Mercedes-Benz, which became the WTA's premier partner on 1 January 2026, replacing Hologic.

== WTA rankings ==
[ · ]

WTA rankings (singles) as of 19 October 2026
No.	Player	Points	Move
1	Elena Rybakina (KAZ)	9,196	Steady
2	Aryna Sabalenka	7,550	Steady
3	Mirra Andreeva	6,306	Steady
4	Jessica Pegula (USA)	6,265	Steady
5	Coco Gauff (USA)	5,974	Steady
6	Elina Svitolina (UKR)	5,229	Steady
7	Karolína Muchová (CZE)	4,833	Steady
8	Linda Nosková (CZE)	4,678	Steady
9	Iga Świątek (POL)	4,389	Steady
10	Marta Kostyuk (UKR)	3,920	Steady
11	Maja Chwalińska (POL)	3,031	▲11
12	Iva Jovic (USA)	2,931	▼1
13	Diana Shnaider	2,663	Steady
14	Belinda Bencic (SUI)	2,662	▼2
15	Elise Mertens (BEL)	2,540	▼1
16	Victoria Mboko (CAN)	2,501	▼1
17	Sorana Cîrstea (ROU)	2,380	▼1
18	Amanda Anisimova (USA)	2,363	▼1
19	Naomi Osaka (JPN)	2,297	▼1
20	Alexandra Eala (PHI)	2,241	▼1

[ · ]

WTA rankings (doubles) as of 19 October 2026
No.	Player	Points	Move
1	Kateřina Siniaková (CZE)	11,260	Steady
2	Taylor Townsend (USA)	9,415	Steady
3	Luisa Stefani (BRA)	9,220	Steady
4	Gabriela Dabrowski (CAN)	8,420	Steady
5	Zhang Shuai (CHN)	6,575	Steady
6	Aleksandra Krunić (SRB)	6,235	Steady
7	Anna Danilina (KAZ)	6,135	Steady
8	Elise Mertens (BEL)	5,693	Steady
9	Nicole Melichar-Martinez (USA)	4,650	Steady
10	Kristina Mladenovic (FRA)	4,610	Steady
11	Hsieh Su-wei (TPE)	4,470	Steady
12	Jeļena Ostapenko (LAT)	4,405	Steady
13	Cristina Bucșa (ESP)	4,200	Steady
14	Guo Hanyu (CHN)	3,782	▲1
15	Sara Errani (ITA)	3,720	▲2
16	Vera Zvonareva	3,707	▼2
17	Aldila Sutjiadi (INA)	3,543	▼1
18	Diana Shnaider	3,423	Steady
19	Ellen Perez (AUS)	3,260	Steady
20	Storm Hunter (AUS)	3,248	▲6

== See also ==
- WTA Tour
- Association of Tennis Professionals
- List of tennis tournaments
- List of WTA number 1 ranked players
- Women's sports
- WTA Awards
- WTA Challenger Series
- WTA Tour Championships
- WTA Tour records
- Tennis Integrity Unit
- WTA rankings
