= 2019 Meitar Open =

- Date: 9–15 September 2019
- Edition: 1st
- Category: ITF Women's World Tennis Tour
- Prize money: $60,000
- Surface: Hard
- Location: Meitar, Israel

Champions

Singles
- (Denmark) Clara Tauson

Doubles
- (Russia) Sofya Lansere / (Russia) Kamilla Rakhimova
Meitar Open	· 2022 →

The 2019 Meitar Open was a professional tennis tournament played on outdoor hard courts. It was the first edition of the tournament which was part of the 2019 ITF Women's World Tennis Tour. It took place in Meitar, Israel between 9 and 15 September 2019.

== Singles main-draw entrants ==
=== Seeds ===
Country	Player	Rank^{1}	Seed
RUS	Vitalia Diatchenko	123	1
GER	Katharina Hobgarski	210	2
FRA	Harmony Tan	217	3
BUL	Isabella Shinikova	223	4
BUL	Elitsa Kostova	227	5
FRA	Myrtille Georges	239	6
CYP	Raluca Șerban	242	7
ESP	Nuria Párrizas Díaz	246	8

- ^{1} Rankings are as of 26 August 2019.

=== Other entrants ===
The following players received wildcards into the singles main draw:

- (Israel) Shelly Bereznyak
- (Romania) Ilona Georgiana Ghioroaie
- (Israel) Shavit Kimchi
- (Israel) Maya Tahan

The following players received entry from the qualifying draw:

- (United Kingdom) Alicia Barnett
- (Israel) Lina Glushko
- (Ukraine) Nadiia Kichenok
- (Belarus) Anna Kubareva
- (Slovakia) Viktória Morvayová
- (France) Victoria Muntean

== Champions ==
=== Singles ===
- (Denmark) Clara Tauson def. (Germany) Katharina Hobgarski, 4–6, 6–3, 6–1

=== Doubles ===
- (Russia) Sofya Lansere / (Russia) Kamilla Rakhimova def. (Russia) Anastasia Gasanova / (Ukraine) Valeriya Strakhova, 4–6, 6–4, [10–3]
