= 2013 Kazan Summer Cup – Doubles =

2013 Kazan Summer Cup – Doubles may refer to either of the following events at the 2013 Kazan Summer Cup:

- 2013 Kazan Summer Cup – Men's Doubles
- 2013 Kazan Summer Cup – Women's Doubles
