= 2013 Kazan Summer Cup – Singles =

2013 Kazan Summer Cup – Singles may refer to either of the following events at the 2013 Kazan Summer Cup:

- 2013 Kazan Summer Cup – Men's Singles
- 2013 Kazan Summer Cup – Women's Singles
