= 2021 Belgrade Challenger – Women's singles =

Women's singles
- 2021 Belgrade Challenger

Final
- Champion: (Slovakia) Anna Karolína Schmiedlová
- Runner-up: (Netherlands) Arantxa Rus
- Score: 6–3, 6–3

Events
| Singles | men | women |
| Doubles | men | women |
- Belgrade Challenger

This was the first edition of the tournament.

Anna Karolína Schmiedlová won the title, defeating Arantxa Rus in the final, 6–3, 6–3.

== Seeds ==
1. (Russia) Anna Blinkova (quarterfinals)
2. (Netherlands) Arantxa Rus (final)
3. (Russia) Varvara Gracheva (second round)
4. (Germany) Andrea Petkovic (semifinals)
5. (Italy) Martina Trevisan (quarterfinals)
6. (Slovenia) Kaja Juvan (first round)
7. (Romania) Irina Bara (second round)
8. (Bulgaria) Viktoriya Tomova (first round)

== Draw ==
Key

- Q = Qualifier
- WC = Wild card
- LL = Lucky loser
- Alt = Alternate
- ITF = ITF entry
- PR = Protected ranking
- SR = Special ranking
- SE = Special exempt
- JE = Junior exempt
- JR = Junior Accelerator Programme entrant
- CO = College Accelerator Programme entrant
- NG = Next Gen Accelerator Program entrant
- w/o = Walkover
- r = Retired
- d = Defaulted

=== Finals ===
Semifinals
(Slovakia) Anna Karolína Schmiedlová | 7^{7} | 6
(Slovakia) Rebecca Šramková | 6^{4} | 1
4 | (Germany) Andrea Petkovic | 5 | 2
2 | (Netherlands) Arantxa Rus | 7 | 6

Final
(Slovakia) Anna Karolína Schmiedlová | 6 | 6
2 | (Netherlands) Arantxa Rus | 3 | 3

=== Top half ===
First round
1 | (Russia) A Blinkova | 6 | 6
(Bulgaria) I Shinikova | 1 | 2
(Belarus) O Govortsova | 6^{2} | 3
(Switzerland) S Bandecchi | 7^{7} | 6
(Slovakia) AK Schmiedlová | 6 | 6
(Croatia) J Fett | 1 | 2
(Germany) J Niemeier | 6 | 7^{12}
8 | (Bulgaria) V Tomova | 3 | 6^{10}
3 | (Russia) V Gracheva | 6 | 6
WC | (Serbia) I Šepa | 1 | 1
(Czech Republic) Kr Plíšková | 6 | 6
WC | (Croatia) T Lukas | 1 | 4
(Slovakia) R Šramková | 6 | 2 | 6
(Croatia) T Mrdeža | 3 | 6 | 4
(Romania) J Cristian | 6 | 7^{7}
6 | (Slovenia) K Juvan | 3 | 6^{2}

Second round
1 | (Russia) A Blinkova | 6 | 7^{7}
(Switzerland) S Bandecchi | 4 | 6^{3}
(Slovakia) AK Schmiedlová | 6 | 5 | 7^{7}
(Germany) J Niemeier | 4 | 7 | 6^{5}
3 | (Russia) V Gracheva | 6^{5} | 4
(Czech Republic) Kr Plíšková | 7^{7} | 6
(Slovakia) R Šramková | 6 | 3 | 6
(Romania) J Cristian | 3 | 6 | 4

Quarterfinals
1 | (Russia) A Blinkova | 6 | 3 | 1
(Slovakia) AK Schmiedlová | 4 | 6 | 6
(Czech Republic) Kr Plíšková | 6 | 4 | 6^{5}
(Slovakia) R Šramková | 4 | 6 | 7^{7}

Semifinals
(Slovakia) AK Schmiedlová | 7^{7} | 6
(Slovakia) R Šramková | 6^{4} | 1

=== Bottom half ===
First round
7 | (Romania) I Bara | 6 | 6
(France) A Hesse | 4 | 1
Q | (Croatia) T Würth | 6 | 6
Q | (Russia) E Yashina | 4 | 1
Q | (France) J Ponchet | 6 | 7^{7}
WC | (Serbia) D Vuković | 1 | 6^{4}
WC | (Serbia) L Radivojević | 3 | 7^{7} | 2
4 | (Germany) A Petkovic | 6 | 6^{5} | 6
5 | (Italy) M Trevisan | 6 | 3 | 6
(Hungary) P Udvardy | 3 | 6 | 4
(Norway) U Eikeri | 6 | 1 | 6
(Ukraine) L Tsurenko | 3 | 6 | 4
(Serbia) O Danilović | 3 | 6 | 7^{7}
Q | (Italy) C Rosatello | 6 | 4 | 6^{5}
(Bulgaria) E Kostova | 1 | 0
2 | (Netherlands) A Rus | 6 | 6

Second round
7 | (Romania) I Bara | 3 | 1
Q | (Croatia) T Würth | 6 | 6
Q | (France) J Ponchet | 5 | 2
4 | (Germany) A Petkovic | 7 | 6
5 | (Italy) M Trevisan | 6 | 6
(Norway) U Eikeri | 1 | 1
(Serbia) O Danilović | 2 | 4
2 | (Netherlands) A Rus | 6 | 6

Quarterfinals
Q | (Croatia) T Würth | 4 | 4
4 | (Germany) A Petkovic | 6 | 6
5 | (Italy) M Trevisan | 1 | 4
2 | (Netherlands) A Rus | 6 | 6

Semifinals
4 | (Germany) A Petkovic | 5 | 2
2 | (Netherlands) A Rus | 7 | 6

== Qualifying ==
=== Seeds ===
1. (France) Jessika Ponchet (qualified)
2. (Belarus) Shalimar Talbi (qualifying competition)
3. (Slovakia) Zuzana Zlochová (qualifying competition)
4. (Italy) Camilla Rosatello (qualified)

=== Qualifiers ===
1. (France) Jessika Ponchet
2. (Russia) Ekaterina Yashina
3. (Croatia) Tara Würth
4. (Italy) Camilla Rosatello

=== Draw ===
==== First qualifier ====
| Qualifying competition |
| 1 | (France) Jessika Ponchet | 6 | 6 |
| WC | (Serbia) Elena Milovanović | 0 | 2 |

==== Second qualifier ====
| Qualifying competition |
| 2 | (Belarus) Shalimar Talbi | 4 | 6 | 1 |
| | (Russia) Ekaterina Yashina | 6 | 4 | 6 |

==== Third qualifier ====
| Qualifying competition |
| 3 | (Slovakia) Zuzana Zlochová | 0 | 1 |
| WC | (Croatia) Tara Würth | 6 | 6 |

==== Fourth qualifier ====
| Qualifying competition |
| 4 | (Italy) Camilla Rosatello | 6 | 7^{7} |
| | (Serbia) Tamara Čurović | 3 | 6^{5} |
