= 2019 Meitar Open – Singles =

Singles
- 2019 Meitar Open

Final
- Champion: (Denmark) Clara Tauson
- Runner-up: (Germany) Katharina Hobgarski
- Score: 4–6, 6–3, 6–1

Events
Singles	Doubles
Meitar Open	· 2022 →

This was the first edition of the tournament.

Clara Tauson won the title, defeating Katharina Hobgarski in the final, 4–6, 6–3, 6–1.

== Seeds ==
1. (Russia) Vitalia Diatchenko (quarterfinals, retired)
2. (Germany) Katharina Hobgarski (final)
3. (France) Harmony Tan (first round, retired)
4. (Bulgaria) Isabella Shinikova (quarterfinals)
5. (Bulgaria) Elitsa Kostova (semifinals)
6. (France) Myrtille Georges (second round)
7. (Cyprus) Raluca Șerban (quarterfinals)
8. (Spain) Nuria Párrizas Díaz (second round)

== Draw ==
=== Key ===
- Q = Qualifier
- WC = Wild card
- LL = Lucky loser
- Alt = Alternate
- SE = Special exempt
- PR = Protected ranking
- ITF = ITF entry
- JE = Junior exempt
- w/o = Walkover
- r = Retired
- d = Defaulted
- SR = Special ranking

=== Finals ===
Semifinals
(Russia) Kamilla Rakhimova	2	4
(Denmark) Clara Tauson	6	6
5	(Bulgaria) Elitsa Kostova	6	3	1
2	(Germany) Katharina Hobgarski	0	6	6

Final
(Denmark) Clara Tauson	4	6	6
2	(Germany) Katharina Hobgarski	6	3	1

=== Top half ===
First round
1	(Russia) V Diatchenko	6	6
WC	(Israel) S Kimchi	1	4
Q	(Belarus) A Kubareva	6	6
(France) L Brouleau	4	2
(Russia) K Rakhimova	6^{7}	6	6
(Russia) A Gasanova	7^{9}	4	0
Q	(Israel) L Glushko	4	0
8	(Spain) N Párrizas Díaz	6	6
4	(Bulgaria) I Shinikova	4	7^{8}	6
(United Kingdom) JA Burrage	6	6^{6}	1
(Israel) J Glushko	4	6	5
(Belarus) Y Hatouka	6	2	7
(Denmark) C Tauson	6	6
(Switzerland) S Bandecchi	4	1
WC	(Israel) M Tahan	0	1
6	(France) M Georges	6	6

Second round
1	(Russia) V Diatchenko	6	6
Q	(Belarus) A Kubareva	4	1
(Russia) K Rakhimova	7^{7}	6
8	(Spain) N Párrizas Díaz	6^{1}	2
4	(Bulgaria) I Shinikova	7^{7}	6
(Belarus) Y Hatouka	6^{2}	3
(Denmark) C Tauson	6	6
6	(France) M Georges	0	3

Quarterfinals
1	(Russia) V Diatchenko	6^{3}	3^{r}
(Russia) K Rakhimova	7^{7}	5
4	(Bulgaria) I Shinikova	2	1
(Denmark) C Tauson	6	6

Semifinals
(Russia) K Rakhimova	2	4
(Denmark) C Tauson	6	6

=== Bottom half ===
First round
5	(Bulgaria) E Kostova	6	6
WC	(Romania) IG Ghioroaie	3	0
(Russia) S Lansere	2	2
(South Africa) C Simmonds	6	6
(Ukraine) V Strakhova	6	4	3
(Netherlands) Q Lemoine	3	6	6
Q	(France) V Muntean	3	7	1
3	(France) H Tan	6	5	0^{r}
7	(Cyprus) R Șerban	6	0
(United Kingdom) M Lumsden	4	0^{r}
(Switzerland) L Küng	6	7
Q	(United Kingdom) A Barnett	4	5
Q	(Slovakia) V Morvayová	6	6
WC	(Israel) S Bereznyak	2	2
Q	(Ukraine) N Kichenok	5	3
2	(Germany) K Hobgarski	7	6

Second round
5	(Bulgaria) E Kostova	6	6
(South Africa) C Simmonds	2	3
(Netherlands) Q Lemoine	4	7	6
Q	(France) V Muntean	6	5	2
7	(Cyprus) R Șerban	7	3	6
(Switzerland) L Küng	5	6	3
Q	(Slovakia) V Morvayová	2	2
2	(Germany) K Hobgarski	6	6

Quarterfinals
5	(Bulgaria) E Kostova	6	7^{10}
(Netherlands) Q Lemoine	2	6^{8}
7	(Cyprus) R Șerban	3	4
2	(Germany) K Hobgarski	6	6

Semifinals
5	(Bulgaria) E Kostova	6	3	1
2	(Germany) K Hobgarski	0	6	6
