= 2009 GEMAX Open – Singles =

Singles
- 2009 GEMAX Open

Final
- Champion: (Serbia) Viktor Troicki
- Runner-up: (Slovakia) Dominik Hrbatý
- Score: 6–4, 6–2

Events
Singles	Doubles
← 2008 ·	GEMAX Open	· 2010 →

Roko Karanušić was the defending champion, but he chose to not participate this year.
Viktor Troicki won in the final 6–4, 6–2, against Dominik Hrbatý.

== Seeds ==
1. (Serbia) Viktor Troicki (champion)
2. (Serbia) Janko Tipsarević (second round)
3. (Ukraine) Sergiy Stakhovsky (second round)
4. (Belgium) Olivier Rochus (semifinals)
5. (Serbia) Ilija Bozoljac (first round)
6. (Slovakia) Karol Beck (quarterfinals)
7. (Russia) Michail Elgin (first round)
8. (Germany) Daniel Brands (quarterfinals)

== Draw ==
=== Key ===
- Q = Qualifier
- WC = Wild card
- LL = Lucky loser
- Alt = Alternate
- SE = Special exempt
- PR = Protected ranking
- ITF = ITF entry
- JE = Junior exempt
- w/o = Walkover
- r = Retired
- d = Defaulted
- SR = Special ranking

=== Final four ===
Semifinals
1	(Serbia) Viktor Troicki	6	6
4	(Belgium) Olivier Rochus	2	0
(Germany) Benedikt Dorsch	4	4
Q	(Slovakia) Dominik Hrbatý	6	6

Final
1	(Serbia) Viktor Troicki	6	6
Q	(Slovakia) Dominik Hrbatý	4	2

=== Top half ===
First round
1	(Serbia) V Troicki	6^{7}	6	7
(Russia) A Kudryavtsev	7	3	6^{5}
(United States) B Evans	6	6
WC	(Croatia) T Androić	1	1
(Romania) A Cruciat	6	4	6^{7}
WC	(Serbia) N Zimonjić	2	6	7
(France) É Roger-Vasselin	3	4
8	(Germany) D Brands	6	6
4	(Belgium) O Rochus	3	7	7
Q	(Germany) M Bachinger	6	6^{5}	6^{6}
Q	(Germany) D Kindlmann	6	6
(Czech Republic) P Šnobel	4	1
(Sweden) B Rehnquist	6^{5}	4
Q	(Israel) H Levy	7	6
(Switzerland) M Chiudinelli	5	2
6	(Slovakia) K Beck	7	6

Second round
1	(Serbia) V Troicki	6	6
(United States) B Evans	3	3
WC	(Serbia) N Zimonjić	6	6^{2}	4
8	(Germany) D Brands	4	6	6
4	(Belgium) O Rochus	6	6
Q	(Germany) D Kindlmann	2	2
Q	(Israel) H Levy	3	2
6	(Slovakia) K Beck	6	6

Quarterfinals
1	(Serbia) V Troicki	6	6
8	(Germany) D Brands	2	3
4	(Belgium) O Rochus	6^{9}	6	7
6	(Slovakia) K Beck	7	3	6^{4}

Semifinals
1	(Serbia) V Troicki	6	6
4	(Belgium) O Rochus	2	0

=== Bottom half ===
First round
5	(Serbia) I Bozoljac	6^{4}	6^{2}
(Germany) B Dorsch	7	7
(Czech Republic) L Rosol	6	6^{5}	6
WC	(Serbia) F Krajinović	3	7	1
(United Kingdom) A Bogdanovic	6^{4}	6^{4}
(France) J Ouanna	7	7
(United States) S Jenkins	3	4
3	(Ukraine) S Stakhovsky	6	6
7	(Russia) M Elgin	1	2
Q	(Slovakia) D Hrbatý	6	6
(Germany) F Mayer	6	6
(France) A Sidorenko	4	3
(Turkey) M İlhan	1	3
(United States) S Warburg	6	6
(Denmark) K Pless	6	3	2
2	(Serbia) J Tipsarević	1	6	6

Second round
(Germany) B Dorsch	6	6
(Czech Republic) L Rosol	3	4
(France) J Ouanna	6	6^{5}	7
3	(Ukraine) S Stakhovsky	4	7	6^{5}
Q	(Slovakia) D Hrbatý	6	3	6
(Germany) F Mayer	2	6	3
(United States) S Warburg	7	7
2	(Serbia) J Tipsarević	6^{4}	6^{3}

Quarterfinals
(Germany) B Dorsch	7	7
(France) J Ouanna	6^{5}	5
Q	(Slovakia) D Hrbatý	7	6
(United States) S Warburg	6^{5}	4

Semifinals
(Germany) B Dorsch	4	4
Q	(Slovakia) D Hrbatý	6	6

== Sources ==
- Main Draw
