= 2021 Belgrade Challenger – Men's singles =

Men's singles
- 2021 Belgrade Challenger

Final
- Champion: (Spain) Roberto Carballés Baena
- Runner-up: (Bosnia and Herzegovina) Damir Džumhur
- Score: 6–4, 7–5

Events
Singles	men	women
Doubles	men	women
- GEMAX Open

This was the first of the three tournaments held in Belgrade for the 2021 tennis season. Belgrade also hosted a joint ATP/WTA tournament.

Roberto Carballés Baena won the title after defeating Damir Džumhur 6–4, 7–5 in the final.

== Seeds ==
1. (Spain) Roberto Carballés Baena (champion)
2. (Argentina) Facundo Bagnis (quarterfinals)
3. (Colombia) Daniel Elahi Galán (first round)
4. (Germany) Philipp Kohlschreiber (second round)
5. (Argentina) Francisco Cerúndolo (first round)
6. (Japan) Taro Daniel (quarterfinals)
7. (Bolivia) Hugo Dellien (second round)
8. (France) Benjamin Bonzi (second round)

== Draw ==
Key

- Q = Qualifier
- WC = Wild card
- LL = Lucky loser
- Alt = Alternate
- ITF = ITF entry
- PR = Protected ranking
- SR = Special ranking
- SE = Special exempt
- JE = Junior exempt
- JR = Junior Accelerator Programme entrant
- CO = College Accelerator Programme entrant
- NG = Next Gen Accelerator Program entrant
- w/o = Walkover
- r = Retired
- d = Defaulted

=== Finals ===
Semifinals
1	(Spain) Roberto Carballés Baena	3	6	6
(United Kingdom) Liam Broady	6	2	3
(Bosnia and Herzegovina) Damir Džumhur	3	6	6
(Slovakia) Jozef Kovalík	6	3	3

Final
1	(Spain) Roberto Carballés Baena	6	7
(Bosnia and Herzegovina) Damir Džumhur	4	5

=== Top half ===
First round
1	(Spain) R Carballés Baena	6	7^{7}
(France) A Rinderknech	4	6^{4}
Q	(Argentina) M Trungelliti	6	6
(Serbia) D Petrović	3	2
SE	(Slovenia) B Rola	6	2
Q	(Italy) A Giannessi	4	0^{r}
SE	(Portugal) G Oliveira	0^{r}
8	(France) B Bonzi	4
3	(Colombia) DE Galán	5	6	4
(Austria) S Ofner	7	3	6
(United Kingdom) L Broady	6	6
(Serbia) N Milojević	3	4
(United States) B Nakashima	6^{7}	6	6
Q	(Morocco) E Benchetrit	7^{9}	1	0
(Netherlands) T Griekspoor	6^{7}	4
7	(Bolivia) H Dellien	7^{9}	6

Second round
1	(Spain) R Carballés Baena	6	6
Q	(Argentina) M Trungelliti	2	4
SE	(Slovenia) B Rola	6	6
8	(France) B Bonzi	2	2
(Austria) S Ofner	6	1	5
(United Kingdom) L Broady	4	6	7
(United States) B Nakashima	6	6
7	(Bolivia) H Dellien	2	2

Quarterfinals
1	(Spain) R Carballés Baena	7^{9}	6
SE	(Slovenia) B Rola	6^{7}	1
(United Kingdom) L Broady	6	6^{2}	6
(United States) B Nakashima	4	7^{7}	4

Semifinals
1	(Spain) R Carballés Baena	3	6	6
(United Kingdom) L Broady	6	2	3

=== Bottom half ===
First round
6	(Japan) T Daniel	6	7
WC	(Serbia) M Miladinović	1	5
Q	(Germany) M Bachinger	7	4	0^{r}
(France) A Hoang	5	6	0
(Bosnia and Herzegovina) D Džumhur	4	6	6
WC	(Serbia) P Krstin	6	2	3
(United States) M Cressy	5	6	2
4	(Germany) P Kohlschreiber	7	4	6
5	(Argentina) F Cerúndolo	6^{6}	1
(Slovakia) J Kovalík	7^{8}	6
(Russia) E Donskoy	4	3
(Italy) F Gaio	6	6
(Germany) O Otte	3	6	3
WC	(Serbia) H Međedović	6	1	6
(Austria) J Rodionov	6	1	2
2	(Argentina) F Bagnis	2	6	6

Second round
6	(Japan) T Daniel	6	6
(France) A Hoang	4	2
(Bosnia and Herzegovina) D Džumhur	6	6
4	(Germany) P Kohlschreiber	4	3
(Slovakia) J Kovalík	6	7^{7}
(Italy) F Gaio	0	6^{4}
WC	(Serbia) H Međedović	2	2
2	(Argentina) F Bagnis	6	6

Quarterfinals
6	(Japan) T Daniel	4	4
(Bosnia and Herzegovina) D Džumhur	6	6
(Slovakia) J Kovalík	2	6	6
2	(Argentina) F Bagnis	6	4	4

Semifinals
(Bosnia and Herzegovina) D Džumhur	3	6	6
(Slovakia) J Kovalík	6	3	3
