= 2022 Meitar Open – Doubles =

Doubles
- 2022 Meitar Open

Final
- Champions: (Greece) Valentini Grammatikopoulou; Ekaterina Yashina
- Runners-up: Anna Kubareva; Maria Timofeeva
- Score: 6–3, 7–5

Events
Singles	Doubles
- Meitar Open

Sofya Lansere and Kamilla Rakhimova were the defending champions but chose not to participate.

Valentini Grammatikopoulou and Ekaterina Yashina won the title, defeating Anna Kubareva and Maria Timofeeva in the final, 6–3, 7–5.

== Seeds ==
1. (United Kingdom) Emily Appleton / (Poland) Weronika Falkowska (semifinals)
2. (Greece) Valentini Grammatikopoulou / Ekaterina Yashina (champions)
3. (Netherlands) Jasmijn Gimbrère / (Chinese Taipei) Lee Pei-chi (semifinals)
4. Anna Kubareva / Maria Timofeeva (final)

== Draw ==
Key

- Q = Qualifier
- WC = Wild card
- LL = Lucky loser
- Alt = Alternate
- ITF = ITF entry
- PR = Protected ranking
- SR = Special ranking
- SE = Special exempt
- JE = Junior exempt
- JR = Junior Accelerator Programme entrant
- CO = College Accelerator Programme entrant
- NG = Next Gen Accelerator Program entrant
- w/o = Walkover
- r = Retired
- d = Defaulted

=== Draw ===
First round
1	(United Kingdom) E Appleton (Poland) W Falkowska	6	6
WC	(Israel) K Altori (Israel) L Oved	3	0
(Israel) L Glushko (Israel) S Kimchi	w/o
(Switzerland) A Rushiti (Georgia (country)) S Shapatava
4	A Kubareva; M Timofeeva	6	6
(Slovakia) M Chudejová (Poland) A Zuchańska	3	1
(Japan) Ma Mushika (Japan) Mi Mushika	6	6
WC	(Israel) S Chiche (Israel) N Major	1	3
(Israel) N Nadel (Israel) A Zack	6	6
(Israel) S Kivity; D Nekhorosheva	1	1
(Israel) M Dagan Fruchtman (Mexico) MF Navarro	4	2
3	(Netherlands) J Gimbrère (Chinese Taipei) P-c Lee	6	6
(Israel) M Buchnik (Israel) T Yaffe	2	4
(Hungary) N Szabanin (Slovakia) R Zelníčková	6	6
WC	(Israel) T Dekel (Israel) E Fesiuk	4	2
2	(Greece) V Grammatikopoulou; E Yashina	6	6

Quarterfinals
1	(United Kingdom) E Appleton (Poland) W Falkowska	6	6
(Israel) L Glushko (Israel) S Kimchi	4	4
4	A Kubareva; M Timofeeva	6	6
(Japan) Ma Mushika (Japan) Mi Mushika	4	3
(Israel) N Nadel (Israel) A Zack	1	1
3	(Netherlands) J Gimbrère (Chinese Taipei) P-c Lee	6	6
(Hungary) N Szabanin (Slovakia) R Zelníčková
2	(Greece) V Grammatikopoulou; E Yashina	w/o

Semifinals
1	(United Kingdom) E Appleton (Poland) W Falkowska	4	6^{8}
4	A Kubareva; M Timofeeva	6	7^{10}
3	(Netherlands) J Gimbrère (Chinese Taipei) P-c Lee	3	4
2	(Greece) V Grammatikopoulou; E Yashina	6	6

Final
4	A Kubareva; M Timofeeva	3	5
2	(Greece) V Grammatikopoulou; E Yashina	6	7
