= Summer Cup =

Summer Cup may refer to:

- Summer Cup (ATC), a Group 3 Australian Turf Club thoroughbred horse race
- Summer Cup (Scotland), a defunct Scottish football cup competition held in the 1940s and 1960s
- Summer Cup (South Africa), a horse race held at the Turffontein Racecourse in South Africa
- Kazan Open, originally known as the Kazan Summer Cup in 2013, an annual professional tennis tournament, held in Kazan, Russia
- Summer Cup (Uttoxeter), a horse race held at Uttoxeter Racecourse in Britain
- NWSL x Liga MX Femenil Summer Cup, a North American association football competition

== See also ==
- Fruit cup (cocktail), also known as a summer cup, an English specialty drink
