= 2021 Belgrade Challenger – Men's doubles =

Men's doubles
- 2021 Belgrade Challenger

Final
- Champions: (Argentina) Guillermo Durán (Argentina) Andrés Molteni
- Runners-up: (Bosnia and Herzegovina) Tomislav Brkić (Serbia) Nikola Ćaćić
- Score: 6–4, 6–4

Events
Singles	men	women
Doubles	men	women
← 2010 ·	GEMAX Open	· 2022 →

This was the first of the three tournaments held in Belgrade for the 2021 tennis season. Belgrade also hosted a joint ATP/WTA tournament.

Guillermo Durán and Andrés Molteni won the title after defeating Tomislav Brkić and Nikola Ćaćić 6–4, 6–4 in the final.

== Seeds ==
1. (Mexico) Santiago González / (India) Divij Sharan (first round)
2. (United Kingdom) Luke Bambridge / (United Kingdom) Dominic Inglot (first round)
3. (Bosnia and Herzegovina) Tomislav Brkić / (Serbia) Nikola Ćaćić (final)
4. (United States) Nicholas Monroe / (Australia) John-Patrick Smith (first round)

== Draw ==
=== Key ===
- Q = Qualifier
- WC = Wild card
- LL = Lucky loser
- Alt = Alternate
- SE = Special exempt
- PR = Protected ranking
- ITF = ITF entry
- JE = Junior exempt
- w/o = Walkover
- r = Retired
- d = Defaulted
- SR = Special ranking

First round
1	(Mexico) S González (India) D Sharan	3	3
(Israel) J Erlich (Belarus) A Vasilevski	6	6
(United Kingdom) L Glasspool (Finland) H Heliövaara	6	4	[5]
(New Zealand) A Sitak (Spain) D Vega Hernández	2	6	[10]
4	(United States) N Monroe (Australia) J-P Smith	7	4	[0]
(Argentina) G Durán (Argentina) A Molteni	5	6	[10]
(Germany) A Begemann (Italy) A Vavassori	7	6
(United States) N Lammons (United States) J Withrow	5	3
WC	(Serbia) H Međedović (Serbia) M Topo	5	6^{3}
(Czech Republic) R Jebavý (Slovakia) I Zelenay	7	7^{7}
WC	(Serbia) V Troicki (Serbia) M Zekić	4	2
3	(Bosnia and Herzegovina) T Brkić (Serbia) N Ćaćić	6	6
WC	(Serbia) M Miladinović (Serbia) M Tepavac	3	2
(Sweden) A Göransson (United Kingdom) J O'Mara	6	6
(Argentina) F Bagnis (Argentina) F Cerúndolo	4	7^{11}	[11]
2	(United Kingdom) L Bambridge (United Kingdom) D Inglot	6	6^{9}	[9]

Quarterfinals
(Israel) J Erlich (Belarus) A Vasilevski	6	6
(New Zealand) A Sitak (Spain) D Vega Hernández	1	1
(Argentina) G Durán (Argentina) A Molteni	6	6
(Germany) A Begemann (Italy) A Vavassori	2	4
(Czech Republic) R Jebavý (Slovakia) I Zelenay	6^{6}	3
3	(Bosnia and Herzegovina) T Brkić (Serbia) N Ćaćić	7^{8}	6
(Sweden) A Göransson (United Kingdom) J O'Mara	3	3
(Argentina) F Bagnis (Argentina) F Cerúndolo	6	6

Semifinals
(Israel) J Erlich (Belarus) A Vasilevski	6	5	[9]
(Argentina) G Durán (Argentina) A Molteni	3	7	[11]
3	(Bosnia and Herzegovina) T Brkić (Serbia) N Ćaćić	6	7^{8}
(Argentina) F Bagnis (Argentina) F Cerúndolo	0	6^{6}

Final
(Argentina) G Durán (Argentina) A Molteni	6	6
3	(Bosnia and Herzegovina) T Brkić (Serbia) N Ćaćić	4	4
