= 2019 Meitar Open – Doubles =

Doubles
- 2019 Meitar Open

Final
- Champions: (Russia) Sofya Lansere (Russia) Kamilla Rakhimova
- Runners-up: (Russia) Anastasia Gasanova (Ukraine) Valeriya Strakhova
- Score: 4–6, 6–4, [10–3]

Events
Singles	Doubles
- Meitar Open

This was the first edition of the tournament.

Sofya Lansere and Kamilla Rakhimova won the title, defeating Anastasia Gasanova and Valeriya Strakhova in the final, 4–6, 6–4, [10–3].

== Seeds ==
1. (United Kingdom) Freya Christie / (Cyprus) Raluca Șerban (quarterfinals)
2. (Switzerland) Leonie Küng / (Bulgaria) Isabella Shinikova (quarterfinals)
3. (Russia) Ksenia Laskutova / (Russia) Ekaterina Yashina (first round)
4. (Germany) Vivian Heisen / (Germany) Katharina Hobgarski (quarterfinals)

== Draw ==
Key

- Q = Qualifier
- WC = Wild card
- LL = Lucky loser
- Alt = Alternate
- ITF = ITF entry
- PR = Protected ranking
- SR = Special ranking
- SE = Special exempt
- JE = Junior exempt
- JR = Junior Accelerator Programme entrant
- CO = College Accelerator Programme entrant
- NG = Next Gen Accelerator Program entrant
- w/o = Walkover
- r = Retired
- d = Defaulted

=== Draw ===
First round
1	(United Kingdom) F Christie (Cyprus) R Șerban	7^{7}	3	[10]
(United Kingdom) A Barnett (France) V Muntean	6^{3}	6	[3]
(Russia) A Gasanova (Ukraine) V Strakhova	4	6	[10]
WC	(Israel) N Khirin (Israel) K Younes	6	3	[4]
3	(Russia) K Laskutova (Russia) E Yashina	3	7^{7}	[12]
(France) L Brouleau (France) M Georges	6	6^{3}	[14]
(Spain) N Párrizas Díaz (Germany) S-R Sekulic	6	3	[10]
(Israel) J Glushko (Israel) L Glushko	4	6	[12]
WC	(Israel) Y Keren (Israel) D Shvartsmann	1	1
(Russia) S Lansere (Russia) K Rakhimova	6	6
(Netherlands) A Hartono (Netherlands) Q Lemoine	6	0	[8]
4	(Germany) V Heisen (Germany) K Hobgarski	4	6	[10]
(France) L Adler (Bulgaria) D Evtimova	2	6	[10]
(Belarus) Y Hatouka (Belarus) A Kubareva	6	2	[12]
WC	(Israel) S Kimchi (Israel) M Tahan	4	3
2	(Switzerland) L Küng (Bulgaria) I Shinikova	6	6

Quarterfinals
1	(United Kingdom) F Christie (Cyprus) R Șerban	2	6^{11}
(Russia) A Gasanova (Ukraine) V Strakhova	6	7^{13}
(France) L Brouleau (France) M Georges	5	7	[16]
(Israel) J Glushko (Israel) L Glushko	7	5	[14]
(Russia) S Lansere (Russia) K Rakhimova	4	6	[10]
4	(Germany) V Heisen (Germany) K Hobgarski	6	4	[7]
(Belarus) Y Hatouka (Belarus) A Kubareva	7	4	[14]
2	(Switzerland) L Küng (Bulgaria) I Shinikova	5	6	[12]

Semifinals
(Russia) A Gasanova (Ukraine) V Strakhova	6	6
(France) L Brouleau (France) M Georges	3	1
(Russia) S Lansere (Russia) K Rakhimova	7	6
(Belarus) Y Hatouka (Belarus) A Kubareva	5	2

Final
(Russia) A Gasanova (Ukraine) V Strakhova	6	4	[3]
(Russia) S Lansere (Russia) K Rakhimova	4	6	[10]
