= 2022 Meitar Open – Singles =

Singles
- 2022 Meitar Open

Final
- Champion: Mirra Andreeva
- Runner-up: (Sweden) Rebecca Peterson
- Score: 6–1, 6–4

Events
Singles	Doubles
- Meitar Open

Clara Tauson was the defending champion but chose not to participate.

Mirra Andreeva won the title, defeating Rebecca Peterson in the final, 6–1, 6–4.

== Seeds ==
1. (Sweden) Rebecca Peterson (final)
2. (Greece) Valentini Grammatikopoulou (second round)
3. (Cyprus) Raluca Șerban (quarterfinals)
4. Polina Kudermetova (first round)
5. (Poland) Weronika Falkowska (first round)
6. (Germany) Noma Noha Akugue (first round)
7. (Lithuania) Justina Mikulskytė (first round)
8. (Hungary) Natália Szabanin (quarterfinals, retired)

== Draw ==
Key

- Q = Qualifier
- WC = Wild card
- LL = Lucky loser
- Alt = Alternate
- ITF = ITF entry
- PR = Protected ranking
- SR = Special ranking
- SE = Special exempt
- JE = Junior exempt
- JR = Junior Accelerator Programme entrant
- CO = College Accelerator Programme entrant
- NG = Next Gen Accelerator Program entrant
- w/o = Walkover
- r = Retired
- d = Defaulted

=== Finals ===
Semifinals
1	(Sweden) Rebecca Peterson	6	6
Ekaterina Reyngold	1	0
Maria Timofeeva	3	0
Mirra Andreeva	6	6

Final
1	(Sweden) Rebecca Peterson	1	4
Mirra Andreeva	6	6

=== Top half ===
First round
1	(Sweden) R Peterson	6	6
D Kudashova	4	1
(Israel) S Kimchi	1	2
(Israel) L Glushko	6	6
(Georgia (country)) S Shapatava	6^{4}	6^{1}
A Kubareva	7^{7}	7^{7}
Q	(Italy) C Girelli	4	0
8	(Hungary) N Szabanin	6	6
4	P Kudermetova	0	2
E Reyngold	6	6
Q	(Slovakia) R Zelníčková	6	6
WC	(Israel) M Dagan Fruchtman	4	0
Q	(United Kingdom) E Appleton	2	1
(United Kingdom) A Brogan	6	6
(South Africa) I Kruger	6	6
5	(Poland) W Falkowska	4	2

Second round
1	(Sweden) R Peterson	6	6
(Israel) L Glushko	1	3
A Kubareva	1	6	2
8	(Hungary) N Szabanin	6	3	6
E Reyngold	6	6
Q	(Slovakia) R Zelníčková	1	1
(United Kingdom) A Brogan	6	6
(South Africa) I Kruger	1	1

Quarterfinals
1	(Sweden) R Peterson	5
8	(Hungary) N Szabanin	3^{r}
E Reyngold	7	6
(United Kingdom) A Brogan	5	3

Semifinals
1	(Sweden) R Peterson	6	6
E Reyngold	1	0

=== Bottom half ===
First round
7	(Lithuania) J Mikulskytė	6	0	4
Q	(Mexico) MF Navarro	4	6	6
M Timofeeva	6	6
WC	(Israel) S Lieberman	1	0
WC	(Israel) N Nadel	4	6	6
(Switzerland) A Rushiti	6	2	4
WC	(Israel) K Altori	0	2
3	(Cyprus) R Șerban	6	6
6	(Germany) N Noha Akugue	7	4	1
Q	(Switzerland) N Keller	5	6	6
E Yashina	1	5
Q	(Chinese Taipei) P-c Lee	6	7
M Andreeva	6	6
Q	(Switzerland) S Scilipoti	2	0
Q	(Israel) M Buchnik	4	4
2	(Greece) V Grammatikopoulou	6	6

Second round
Q	(Mexico) MF Navarro	1	3
M Timofeeva	6	6
WC	(Israel) N Nadel	3	4
3	(Cyprus) R Șerban	6	6
Q	(Switzerland) N Keller	3	6	5
Q	(Chinese Taipei) P-c Lee	6	4	7
M Andreeva	6	6
2	(Greece) V Grammatikopoulou	2	2

Quarterfinals
M Timofeeva	6	6
3	(Cyprus) R Șerban	1	4
Q	(Chinese Taipei) P-c Lee	1	0
M Andreeva	6	6

Semifinals
M Timofeeva	3	0
M Andreeva	6	6
