= 2021 Belgrade Challenger – Women's doubles =

Women's doubles
- 2021 Belgrade Challenger

Final
- Champions: (Belarus) Olga Govortsova (Belarus) Lidziya Marozava
- Runners-up: (Russia) Alena Fomina (Russia) Ekaterina Yashina
- Score: 6–2, 6–2

Events
Singles	men	women
Doubles	men	women
- Belgrade Challenger

This was the first edition of the tournament.

Olga Govortsova and Lidziya Marozava won the title, defeating Alena Fomina and Ekaterina Yashina in the final, 6–2, 6–2.

== Seeds ==
1. (Russia) Natela Dzalamidze / (Georgia (country)) Oksana Kalashnikova (quarterfinals)
2. (Belarus) Olga Govortsova / (Belarus) Lidziya Marozava (champions)
3. (Norway) Ulrikke Eikeri / (Hungary) Panna Udvardy (quarterfinals)
4. (France) Estelle Cascino / (Italy) Camilla Rosatello (quarterfinals)

== Draw ==
Key

- Q = Qualifier
- WC = Wild card
- LL = Lucky loser
- Alt = Alternate
- ITF = ITF entry
- PR = Protected ranking
- SR = Special ranking
- SE = Special exempt
- JE = Junior exempt
- JR = Junior Accelerator Programme entrant
- CO = College Accelerator Programme entrant
- NG = Next Gen Accelerator Program entrant
- w/o = Walkover
- r = Retired
- d = Defaulted

=== Draw ===
First round
WC	(Serbia) E Milovanović (Serbia) L Radivojević	5	3
(Russia) A Fomina (Russia) E Yashina	7	6
(Indonesia) B Gumulya (Belarus) S Talbi	6	3	[10]
(Romania) E Bogdan (Indonesia) J Rompies	1	6	[4]
(Croatia) J Fett (Slovakia) R Šramková	5	4
(Switzerland) S Bandecchi (Bulgaria) I Shinikova	7	6

Quarterfinals
1	(Russia) N Dzalamidze (Georgia (country)) O Kalashnikova	2	1
(Russia) A Fomina (Russia) E Yashina	6	6
4	(France) E Cascino (Italy) C Rosatello	3	3
(Indonesia) B Gumulya (Belarus) S Talbi	6	6
(Croatia) T Lukas (Croatia) T Mrdeža	4	7^{7}	[10]
3	(Norway) U Eikeri (Hungary) P Udvardy	6	6^{1}	[4]
(Switzerland) S Bandecchi (Bulgaria) I Shinikova	4	3
2	(Belarus) O Govortsova (Belarus) L Marozava	6	6

Semifinals
(Russia) A Fomina (Russia) E Yashina	6	6^{2}	[10]
(Indonesia) B Gumulya (Belarus) S Talbi	2	7^{7}	[7]
(Croatia) T Lukas (Croatia) T Mrdeža	2	0
2	(Belarus) O Govortsova (Belarus) L Marozava	6	6

Final
(Russia) A Fomina (Russia) E Yashina	2	2
2	(Belarus) O Govortsova (Belarus) L Marozava	6	6
