= 2010 GEMAX Open =

- Date: February 15 – February 21
- Edition: 8th
- Location: Belgrade, Serbia

Champions

Singles
- (Slovakia) Karol Beck

Doubles
- (Serbia) Ilija Bozoljac / (United Kingdom) Jamie Delgado
← 2009 ·	GEMAX Open	· 2021 →

The 2010 GEMAX Open was a professional tennis tournament played on carpet courts. It was part of the Tretorn SERIE+ of the 2010 ATP Challenger Tour. It took place in Belgrade, Serbia between 15 and 21 February 2010.

== ATP entrants ==
=== Seeds ===
Country	Player	Rank	Seed
SRB	Janko Tipsarević	37	1
KAZ	Andrey Golubev	106	2
KAZ	Mikhail Kukushkin	122	3
AUT	Stefan Koubek	125	4
GER	Björn Phau	126	5
JAM	Dustin Brown	132	6
SVK	Karol Beck	139	7
IND	Somdev Devvarman	141	8

- Rankings are as of February 8, 2010.

=== Other entrants ===
The following players received wildcards into the singles main draw:

- (Serbia) Nikola Ćaćić
- (Serbia) Filip Krajinović
- (Serbia) Dušan Lajović
- (Serbia) Janko Tipsarević

The following players received entry from the qualifying draw:

- (Czech Republic) Jan Minář
- (Sweden) Filip Prpic
- (Austria) Martin Slanar
- (Germany) Simon Stadler

The following player received special exempt into the main draw:

- (Luxembourg) Gilles Müller

== Champions ==
=== Singles ===
(Slovakia) Karol Beck def. (Serbia) Ilija Bozoljac, 7–5, 7–6(4)

=== Doubles ===
(Serbia) Ilija Bozoljac / (United Kingdom) Jamie Delgado def. (Jamaica) Dustin Brown / (Austria) Martin Slanar, 6–3, 6–3
