= 2022 Meitar Open =

Tennis tournament

- Date: 14–20 November 2022
- Edition: 2nd
- Category: ITF Women's World Tennis Tour
- Prize money: $60,000
- Surface: Hard
- Location: Meitar, Israel

Champions

Singles
- Mirra Andreeva

Doubles
- (Greece) Valentini Grammatikopoulou / Ekaterina Yashina
- Meitar Open

The 2022 Meitar Open was a professional tennis tournament played on outdoor hard courts. It was the second edition of the tournament which was part of the 2022 ITF Women's World Tennis Tour. It took place in Meitar, Israel between 14 and 20 November 2022.

== Champions ==
=== Singles ===
- Mirra Andreeva def. (Sweden) Rebecca Peterson, 6–1, 6–4

=== Doubles ===
- (Greece) Valentini Grammatikopoulou / Ekaterina Yashina def. Anna Kubareva / Maria Timofeeva, 6–3, 7–5

== Singles main draw entrants ==
=== Seeds ===
Country	Player	Rank^{1}	Seed
SWE	Rebecca Peterson	144	1
GRE	Valentini Grammatikopoulou	200	2
CYP	Raluca Șerban	216	3
	Polina Kudermetova	218	4
POL	Weronika Falkowska	249	5
GER	Noma Noha Akugue	258	6
LTU	Justina Mikulskytė	264	7
HUN	Natália Szabanin	280	8

- ^{1} Rankings are as of 7 November 2022.

=== Other entrants ===
The following players received wildcards into the singles main draw:

- (Israel) Karin Altori
- (Israel) Mika Dagan Fruchtman
- (Israel) Shachf Lieberman
- (Israel) Nicole Nadel

The following players received entry from the qualifying draw:

- (United Kingdom) Emily Appleton
- (Israel) Mika Buchnik
- (Italy) Chiara Girelli
- (Switzerland) Nadine Keller
- (Chinese Taipei) Lee Pei-chi
- (Mexico) María Fernanda Navarro
- (Switzerland) Sebastianna Scilipoti
- (Slovakia) Radka Zelníčková
