= 2009 GEMAX Open – Doubles =

Doubles
- 2009 GEMAX Open

Final
- Champions: (Germany) Michael Kohlmann (Germany) Philipp Marx
- Runners-up: (Pakistan) Aisam-ul-Haq Qureshi (Croatia) Lovro Zovko
- Score: 3–6, 6–2, 10–8

Events
Singles	Doubles
← 2008 ·	GEMAX Open	· 2010 →

Flavio Cipolla and Konstantinos Economidis were the defending champions; however, they chose to not defend their 2008 title.
Michael Kohlmann and Philipp Marx won in the final 3–6, 6–2, 10–8, against Aisam-ul-Haq Qureshi and Lovro Zovko.

== Seeds ==
1. (Switzerland) Yves Allegro / (Romania) Horia Tecău (first round)
2. (Czech Republic) David Škoch / (Slovakia) Igor Zelenay (first round)
3. (Pakistan) Aisam-ul-Haq Qureshi / (Croatia) Lovro Zovko (final)
4. (Germany) Michael Kohlmann / (Germany) Philipp Marx (champions)

== Draw ==
=== Key ===
- Q = Qualifier
- WC = Wild card
- LL = Lucky loser
- Alt = Alternate
- SE = Special exempt
- PR = Protected ranking
- ITF = ITF entry
- JE = Junior exempt
- w/o = Walkover
- r = Retired
- d = Defaulted
- SR = Special ranking

=== Draw ===
First round
1	(Switzerland) Y Allegro (Romania) H Tecău	6^{4}	6	[7]
WC	(Serbia) D Mađarovski (Serbia) J Tisparević	7	4	[10]
(Czech Republic) D Karol (Denmark) K Pless	5	3
WC	(Serbia) N Čačić (Serbia) Aleksandar Slović	7	6
4	(Germany) M Kohlmann (Germany) P Marx	6	6
(United Kingdom) A Bogdanovic (Belgium) O Rochus	4	1
(United Kingdom) J Auckland (Germany) D Brands	6	6
(Israel) H Levy (United States) S Warburg	1	4
(Russia) M Elgin (Russia) A Kudryavtsev	6	3	[8]
WC	(Bosnia and Herzegovina) M Bašić (Serbia) Ilija Vucić	4	6	[10]
(Romania) F Mergea (Italy) A Motti	2	2
3	(Pakistan) A-u-H Qureshi (Croatia) L Zovko	6	6
(Ukraine) S Bubka (Ukraine) S Stakhovsky	3	7	[10]
(Austria) M Slanar (Czech Republic) P Šnobel	6	6^{5}	[8]
(Slovakia) K Beck (Czech Republic) J Levinský	6	7
2	(Czech Republic) D Škoch (Slovakia) I Zelenay	1	6^{3}

Quarterfinals
WC	(Serbia) D Mađarovski (Serbia) J Tisparević	5	6	[11]
WC	(Serbia) N Čačić (Serbia) A Slović	7	3	[13]
4	(Germany) M Kohlmann (Germany) P Marx	6	6
(United Kingdom) J Auckland (Germany) D Brands	4	2
WC	(Bosnia and Herzegovina) M Bašić (Serbia) I Vucić	6^{13}	3
3	(Pakistan) A-u-H Qureshi (Croatia) L Zovko	7	6
(Ukraine) S Bubka (Ukraine) S Stakhovsky	6	4	[10]
(Slovakia) K Beck (Czech Republic) J Levinský	4	6	[6]

Semifinals
WC	(Serbia) N Čačić (Serbia) A Slović	4	2
4	(Germany) M Kohlmann (Germany) P Marx	6	6
3	(Pakistan) A-u-H Qureshi (Croatia) L Zovko
(Ukraine) S Bubka (Ukraine) S Stakhovsky	w/o

Finals
4	(Germany) M Kohlmann (Germany) P Marx	3	6	[10]
3	(Pakistan) A-u-H Qureshi (Croatia) L Zovko	6	2	[8]
