= 2010 GEMAX Open – Doubles =

Doubles
- 2010 GEMAX Open

Final
- Champions: (Serbia) Ilija Bozoljac (United Kingdom) Jamie Delgado
- Runners-up: (Jamaica) Dustin Brown (Austria) Martin Slanar
- Score: 6–3, 6–3

Events
Singles	Doubles
← 2009 ·	GEMAX Open	· 2021 →

Michael Kohlmann and Philipp Marx were the defending champions; however, they chose participating in ATP World Tour tournaments (Kohlmann in Memphis and Marx in Marseille).
Ilija Bozoljac and Jamie Delgado won in the final 6–3, 6–3, against Dustin Brown and Martin Slanar.

== Seeds ==
1. (United Kingdom) Jonathan Marray / (United Kingdom) Jamie Murray (first round)
2. (Italy) Daniele Bracciali / (Italy) Alessandro Motti (first round)
3. (Poland) Tomasz Bednarek / (Poland) Mateusz Kowalczyk (first round)
4. (India) Prakash Amritraj / (United States) James Cerretani (semifinals)

== Draw ==
=== Key ===
- Q = Qualifier
- WC = Wild card
- LL = Lucky loser
- Alt = Alternate
- SE = Special exempt
- PR = Protected ranking
- ITF = ITF entry
- JE = Junior exempt
- w/o = Walkover
- r = Retired
- d = Defaulted
- SR = Special ranking

=== Draw ===
First round
1	(United Kingdom) J Marray (United Kingdom) J Murray	4	6^{4}
(Croatia) I Dodig (Germany) F Moser	6	7
(United Kingdom) A Bogdanovic (Kazakhstan) M Kukushkin	7	5	[6]
(Jamaica) D Brown (Austria) M Slanar	6^{4}	7	[10]
4	(India) P Amritraj (United States) J Cerretani	5	6	[10]
(Slovakia) K Beck (Czech Republic) J Krkoška	7	3	[7]
(Germany) J Reister (Slovenia) G Žemlja	7	6
(Serbia) N Čačić (Serbia) D Lajović	6^{3}	3
(Kazakhstan) A Golubev (France) A Sidorenko	7	6
WC	(Croatia) F Škugor (Croatia) I Zovko	5	3
(Serbia) I Bozoljac (United Kingdom) J Delgado	7	7
3	(Poland) T Bednarek (Poland) M Kowalczyk	6^{9}	6^{5}
(Serbia) A Slović (Serbia) A Zlatanović	6	3	[8]
(Croatia) M Ančić (Croatia) L Zovko	3	6	[10]
(Switzerland) Y Allegro (Poland) M Przysiężny	6	6
2	(Italy) D Bracciali (Italy) A Motti	3	2

Quarterfinals
(Croatia) I Dodig (Germany) F Moser	6^{4}	3
(Jamaica) D Brown (Austria) M Slanar	7	6
4	(India) P Amritraj (United States) J Cerretani	6	6
(Germany) J Reister (Slovenia) G Žemlja	3	4
(Kazakhstan) A Golubev (France) A Sidorenko	3	6^{4}
(Serbia) I Bozoljac (United Kingdom) J Delgado	6	7
(Croatia) M Ančić (Croatia) L Zovko	6	6
(Switzerland) Y Allegro (Poland) M Przysiężny	3	3

Semifinals
(Jamaica) D Brown (Austria) M Slanar	6	3	[10]
4	(India) P Amritraj (United States) J Cerretani	2	6	[7]
(Serbia) I Bozoljac (United Kingdom) J Delgado	6^{3}	6	[10]
(Croatia) M Ančić (Croatia) L Zovko	7	4	[3]

Finals
(Jamaica) D Brown (Austria) M Slanar	3	3
(Serbia) I Bozoljac (United Kingdom) J Delgado	6	6
