= 2010 GEMAX Open – Singles =

Singles
- 2010 GEMAX Open

Final
- Champion: (Slovakia) Karol Beck
- Runner-up: (Serbia) Ilija Bozoljac
- Score: 7–5, 7–6(4)

Events
Singles	Doubles
- GEMAX Open

Viktor Troicki was the defending champion, but he chose to not participate this year.
Karol Beck won in the final of this tournament 7–5, 7–6(4), against host Ilija Bozoljac.

== Seeds ==
1. (Serbia) Janko Tipsarević (semifinals)
2. (Kazakhstan) Andrey Golubev (quarterfinals, retired)
3. (Kazakhstan) Mikhail Kukushkin (first round)
4. (Austria) Stefan Koubek (second round)
5. (Germany) Björn Phau (first round)
6. (Jamaica) Dustin Brown (first round)
7. (Slovakia) Karol Beck (champion)
8. (India) Somdev Devvarman (first round)

== Draw ==
Key

- Q = Qualifier
- WC = Wild card
- LL = Lucky loser
- Alt = Alternate
- ITF = ITF entry
- PR = Protected ranking
- SR = Special ranking
- SE = Special exempt
- JE = Junior exempt
- JR = Junior Accelerator Programme entrant
- CO = College Accelerator Programme entrant
- NG = Next Gen Accelerator Program entrant
- w/o = Walkover
- r = Retired
- d = Defaulted

=== Finals ===
Semifinals
1/WC	(Serbia) Janko Tipsarević	3	2
7	(Slovakia) Karol Beck	6	6
(United Kingdom) Alex Bogdanovic	6^{5}	5
(Serbia) Ilija Bozoljac	7	7

Final
7	(Slovakia) Karol Beck	7	7
(Serbia) Ilija Bozoljac	5	6^{4}

=== Top half ===
First round
1/WC	(Serbia) J Tipsarević	6	6
Q	(Germany) S Stadler	3	4
Q	(Czech Republic) J Minář	6	7
WC	(Serbia) N Čačić	3	5
(United States) B Evans	2	2
(Switzerland) M Lammer	6	6
(Czech Republic) L Rosol	6^{5}	7	6
5	(Germany) B Phau	7	6^{5}	0
4	(Austria) S Koubek	6	6
WC	(Serbia) D Lajović	4	3
(Croatia) R Karanušić	6	6
(Slovenia) G Žemlja	2	4
ALT	(United States) A Kuznetsov	1	3
Q	(Sweden) F Prpic	6	6
Q	(Austria) M Slanar	3	2
7	(Slovakia) K Beck	6	6

Second round
1/WC	(Serbia) J Tipsarević	6	6
Q	(Czech Republic) J Minář	2	3
(Switzerland) M Lammer	2	5
(Czech Republic) L Rosol	6	7
4	(Austria) S Koubek	4	6^{3}
(Croatia) R Karanušić	6	7
Q	(Sweden) F Prpic	3	6	4
7	(Slovakia) K Beck	6	4	6

Quarterfinals
1/WC	(Serbia) J Tipsarević	4	7	7
(Czech Republic) L Rosol	6	6^{5}	5
(Croatia) R Karanušić	3	6^{7}
7	(Slovakia) K Beck	6	7

Semifinals
1/WC	(Serbia) J Tipsarević	3	2
7	(Slovakia) K Beck	6	6

=== Bottom half ===
First round
8	(India) S Devvarman	6	6^{6}	3
WC	(Serbia) F Krajinović	3	7	6
(Germany) J Reister	7	3	4
(United Kingdom) A Bogdanovic	6^{5}	6	6
(Netherlands) R Sluiter	4	2
(Germany) D Kindlmann	6	6
(Poland) M Przysiężny	7	6
3	(Kazakhstan) M Kukushkin	6^{5}	2
6	(Jamaica) D Brown	3	2
(Slovakia) D Hrbatý	6	6
(Serbia) I Bozoljac	7	6
(Croatia) I Dodig	6^{5}	1
SE	(Luxembourg) G Müller	7	7
(Croatia) M Ančić	6^{5}	6^{7}
(France) A Sidorenko	3	3
2	(Kazakhstan) A Golubev	6	6

Second round
WC	(Serbia) F Krajinović	3	4
(United Kingdom) A Bogdanovic	6	6
(Germany) D Kindlmann	3	5
(Poland) M Przysiężny	6	7
(Slovakia) D Hrbatý	6^{2}	4
(Serbia) I Bozoljac	7	6
SE	(Luxembourg) G Müller	6^{8}	3
2	(Kazakhstan) A Golubev	7	6

Quarterfinals
(United Kingdom) A Bogdanovic	7	6
(Poland) M Przysiężny	6^{6}	3
(Serbia) I Bozoljac	6	5
2	(Kazakhstan) A Golubev	4	3	r

Semifinals
(United Kingdom) A Bogdanovic	6^{5}	5
(Serbia) I Bozoljac	7	7
