= 2013 Kazan Summer Cup – Women's doubles =

Women's doubles
- 2013 Kazan Summer Cup

Final
- Champions: (Russia) Veronika Kudermetova (Russia) Evgeniya Rodina
- Runners-up: (Russia) Alexandra Artamonova (Czech Republic) Martina Borecká
- Score: 5–7, 6–0, [10–8]

Events
Singles	men	women
Doubles	men	women
← 2012 ·	Kazan Summer Cup	· 2014 →

This was a new event on the 2013 ITF Women's Circuit.

The wildcard pair Veronika Kudermetova and Evgeniya Rodina won the title, defeating Alexandra Artamonova and Martina Borecká in the final, 5–7, 6–0, [10–8].

== Seeds ==
1. (Ukraine) Veronika Kapshay / (Russia) Arina Rodionova (first round)
2. (Belarus) Ilona Kremen / (Belarus) Aliaksandra Sasnovich (semifinals)
3. (Russia) Margarita Gasparyan / (Ukraine) Lyudmyla Kichenok (first round)
4. (Russia) Marina Melnikova / (Belarus) Sviatlana Pirazhenka (first round)

== Draw ==
=== Key ===
- Q = Qualifier
- WC = Wild card
- LL = Lucky loser
- Alt = Alternate
- SE = Special exempt
- PR = Protected ranking
- ITF = ITF entry
- JE = Junior exempt
- w/o = Walkover
- r = Retired
- d = Defaulted
- SR = Special ranking

First round
1	(Ukraine) V Kapshay (Russia) A Rodionova	4	6	[8]
(Russia) Y Kalabina (Kyrgyzstan) K Palkina	6	0	[10]
(Russia) A Artamonova (Czech Republic) M Borecká	6	6
WC	(Russia) A Frolova (Russia) A Kalimullina	4	4
4	(Russia) M Melnikova (Belarus) S Pirazhenka	6	3	[9]
(Russia) M Lazareva (Belarus) P Pekhova	3	6	[11]
(Belarus) L Marozava (Russia) E Pashkova	6	6
(Russia) O Doroshina (Russia) P Leykina	2	3
(Uzbekistan) A Khabibulina (Ukraine) A Vasylyeva	2	2
(Ukraine) V Ivakhnenko (Ukraine) K Kozlova	6	6
WC	(Russia) V Kudermetova (Russia) E Rodina	2	6	[10]
3	(Russia) M Gasparyan (Ukraine) L Kichenok	6	1	[8]
WC	(Uzbekistan) V Ekshibarova (Russia) T Samodelok	2	4
(Ukraine) A Fomina (Russia) E Yashina	6	6
(Serbia) T Čurović (Poland) J Jegiołka	7	4	[9]
2	(Belarus) I Kremen (Belarus) A Sasnovich	5	6	[11]

Quarterfinals
(Russia) Y Kalabina (Kyrgyzstan) K Palkina	0	5
(Russia) A Artamonova (Czech Republic) M Borecká	6	7
(Russia) M Lazareva (Belarus) P Pekhova	6	4	[10]
(Belarus) L Marozava (Russia) E Pashkova	3	6	[3]
(Ukraine) V Ivakhnenko (Ukraine) K Kozlova	2	2
WC	(Russia) V Kudermetova (Russia) E Rodina	6	6
(Ukraine) A Fomina (Russia) E Yashina	3	6	[3]
2	(Belarus) I Kremen (Belarus) A Sasnovich	6	3	[10]

Semifinals
(Russia) A Artamonova (Czech Republic) M Borecká	4	7^{7}	[10]
(Russia) M Lazareva (Belarus) P Pekhova	6	6^{2}	[8]
WC	(Russia) V Kudermetova (Russia) E Rodina	1	6	[10]
2	(Belarus) I Kremen (Belarus) A Sasnovich	6	0	[8]

Final
(Russia) A Artamonova (Czech Republic) M Borecká	7	0	[8]
WC	(Russia) V Kudermetova (Russia) E Rodina	5	6	[10]
