= 2021 Belgrade Challenger =

- Date: 12–18 April (men); 26–31 July (women)
- Edition: 9th (men); 1st (women)
- Prize money: $115,000
- Surface: Clay
- Location: Belgrade, Serbia
- Venue: Novak Tennis Center

Champions

Men's singles
- (Spain) Roberto Carballés Baena

Women's singles
- (Slovakia) Anna Karolína Schmiedlová

Men's doubles
- (Argentina) Guillermo Durán / (Argentina) Andrés Molteni

Women's doubles
- (Belarus) Olga Govortsova / (Belarus) Lidziya Marozava
- Belgrade Challenger

The 2021 Belgrade Challenger was a professional tennis tournament played on clay courts. It was the ninth edition of the tournament which was part of the 2021 ATP Challenger Tour. It took place in Belgrade, Serbia between 12 and 18 April 2021.

For the first time, a women's tournament was also held between 26 and 31 July, categorized as a WTA 125 event at the same venue, which was part of 2021 WTA 125K series.

== ATP singles main-draw entrants ==
=== Seeds ===
Country	Player	Rank^{1}	Seed
ESP	Roberto Carballés Baena	98	1
ARG	Facundo Bagnis	104	2
COL	Daniel Elahi Galán	110	3
GER	Philipp Kohlschreiber	112	4
ARG	Francisco Cerúndolo	114	5
JPN	Taro Daniel	117	6
BOL	Hugo Dellien	121	7
FRA	Benjamin Bonzi	125	8

- ^{1} Rankings are as of 5 April 2021.

=== Other entrants ===
The following players received wildcards into the singles main draw:

- (Serbia) Peđa Krstin
- (Serbia) Hamad Međedović
- (Serbia) Marko Miladinović

The following players received entry into the singles main draw as special exempts:

- (Portugal) Gonçalo Oliveira
- (Slovenia) Blaž Rola

The following players received entry from the qualifying draw:

- (Germany) Matthias Bachinger
- (Morocco) Elliot Benchetrit
- (Italy) Alessandro Giannessi
- (Argentina) Marco Trungelliti

== WTA singles main-draw entrants ==
=== Seeds ===
Country	Player	Rank^{1}	Seed
RUS	Anna Blinkova	83	1
NED	Arantxa Rus	85	2
RUS	Varvara Gracheva	89	3
GER	Andrea Petkovic	97	4
ITA	Martina Trevisan	102	5
SLO	Kaja Juvan	107	6
ROU	Irina Bara	116	7
BUL	Viktoriya Tomova	117	8

- ^{1} Rankings are as of 19 July 2021.

=== Other entrants ===
The following players received wildcards into the singles main draw:

- (Croatia) Tena Lukas
- (Serbia) Lola Radivojević
- (Serbia) Iva Šepa
- (Serbia) Draginja Vuković

The following players received entry from the qualifying draw:

- (France) Jessika Ponchet
- (Italy) Camilla Rosatello
- (Croatia) Tara Würth
- (Russia) Ekaterina Yashina

=== Withdrawals ===
Before the tournament

- (Romania) Ana Bogdan → replaced by (Croatia) Tereza Mrdeža
- (Italy) Elisabetta Cocciaretto → replaced by (Ukraine) Lesia Tsurenko
- (Kazakhstan) Zarina Diyas → replaced by (Belarus) Olga Govortsova
- (France) Océane Dodin → replaced by (France) Amandine Hesse
- (Italy) Sara Errani → replaced by (Romania) Jaqueline Cristian
- (Switzerland) Viktorija Golubic → replaced by (Slovakia) Rebecca Šramková
- (Slovenia) Polona Hercog → replaced by (Germany) Jule Niemeier
- (Russia) Anna Kalinskaya → replaced by (Germany) Andrea Petkovic
- (Italy) Jasmine Paolini → replaced by (Croatia) Jana Fett
- (Romania) Elena-Gabriela Ruse → replaced by (Hungary) Panna Udvardy
- (Belarus) Aliaksandra Sasnovich → replaced by (Bulgaria) Isabella Shinikova
- (Romania) Patricia Maria Țig → replaced by (Switzerland) Susan Bandecchi
- (Switzerland) Stefanie Vögele → replaced by (Serbia) Olga Danilović

== WTA doubles main-draw entrants ==
=== Seeds ===
Country	Player	Country	Player	Rank^{1}	Seed
RUS	Natela Dzalamidze	GEO	Oksana Kalashnikova	251	1
BLR	Olga Govortsova	BLR	Lidziya Marozava	355	2
NOR	Ulrikke Eikeri	HUN	Panna Udvardy	378	3
FRA	Estelle Cascino	ITA	Camilla Rosatello	382	4

- ^{1} Rankings are as of 19 July 2021.

=== Other entrants ===
The following pair received a wildcard into the doubles main draw:

- (Serbia) Elena Milovanović / (Serbia) Lola Radivojević

== Champions ==
=== Men's singles ===
- (Spain) Roberto Carballés Baena def. (Bosnia and Herzegovina) Damir Džumhur 6–4, 7–5.

=== Women's singles ===
- (Slovakia) Anna Karolína Schmiedlová def. (Netherlands) Arantxa Rus 6–3, 6–3

=== Men's doubles ===
- (Argentina) Guillermo Durán / (Argentina) Andrés Molteni def. (Bosnia and Herzegovina) Tomislav Brkić / (Serbia) Nikola Ćaćić 6–4, 6–4.

=== Women's doubles ===
- (Belarus) Olga Govortsova / (Belarus) Lidziya Marozava def. (Russia) Alena Fomina / (Russia) Ekaterina Yashina 6–2, 6–2
