= 2009 GEMAX Open =

- Date: February 15 – February 21
- Edition: 7th
- Location: Belgrade, Serbia

Champions

Singles
- (Serbia) Viktor Troicki

Doubles
- (Germany) Michael Kohlmann / (Germany) Philipp Marx
← 2008 ·	GEMAX Open	· 2010 →

The 2009 GEMAX Open was a professional tennis tournament played on carpet courts. It was part of the Tretorn SERIE+ of the 2009 ATP Challenger Tour. It took place in Belgrade, Serbia between 16 and 22 February 2009.

== Singles main-draw entrants ==
=== Seeds ===
Country	Player	Rank	Seed
SRB	Viktor Troicki	46	1
SRB	Janko Tipsarević	49	2
UKR	Sergiy Stakhovsky	80	3
BEL	Olivier Rochus	117	4
SRB	Ilija Bozoljac	136	5
SVK	Karol Beck	137	6
RUS	Mikhail Elgin	142	7
GER	Daniel Brands	145	8

- Rankings are as of February 9, 2009.

=== Other entrants ===
The following players received wildcards into the singles main draw:

- (Croatia) Toni Androić
- (Serbia) Filip Krajinović
- (Serbia) Janko Tipsarević
- (Serbia) Nenad Zimonjić

The following players received entry from the qualifying draw:

- (Germany) Matthias Bachinger
- (Slovakia) Dominik Hrbatý
- (Germany) Dieter Kindlmann
- (Israel) Harel Levy

== Champions ==
=== Men's singles ===
(Serbia) Viktor Troicki def. (Slovakia) Dominik Hrbatý, 6–4, 6–2

=== Men's doubles ===
(Germany) Michael Kohlmann / (Germany) Philipp Marx def. (Pakistan) Aisam-ul-Haq Qureshi / (Croatia) Lovro Zovko, 3–6, 6–2, 10–8
