= Meitar Open =

- 2022 Meitar Open

ITF Women's Tour
- Event name: Meitar Open
- Location: Meitar, Israel
- Venue: Meitar Sports Center
- Category: ITF Women's Circuit
- Surface: Hard
- Draw: 32S/24Q/16D
- Prize money: $60,000

The Meitar Open was a tennis tournament for professional female players. The event was classified as a $60,000 ITF Women's Circuit tournament and was held in Meitar, Israel, 2019 on outdoor hardcourts.

== Past finals ==
=== Singles ===
Year	Champion	Runner-up	Score
2022	Mirra Andreeva	(Sweden) Rebecca Peterson	6–1, 6–4
2020–21	Tournament cancelled due to the COVID-19 pandemic		
2019	(Denmark) Clara Tauson	(Germany) Katharina Hobgarski	4–6, 6–3, 6–1

=== Doubles ===
Year	Champions	Runners-up	Score
2022	(Greece) Valentini Grammatikopoulou; Ekaterina Yashina	Anna Kubareva; Maria Timofeeva	6–3, 7–5
2020–21	Tournament cancelled due to the COVID-19 pandemic		
2019	(Russia) Sofya Lansere (Russia) Kamilla Rakhimova	(Russia) Anastasia Gasanova (Ukraine) Valeriya Strakhova	4–6, 6–4, [10–3]
