= Anastasia Frolova =

Russian tennis player

Anastasia Frolova Анастасия Фролова
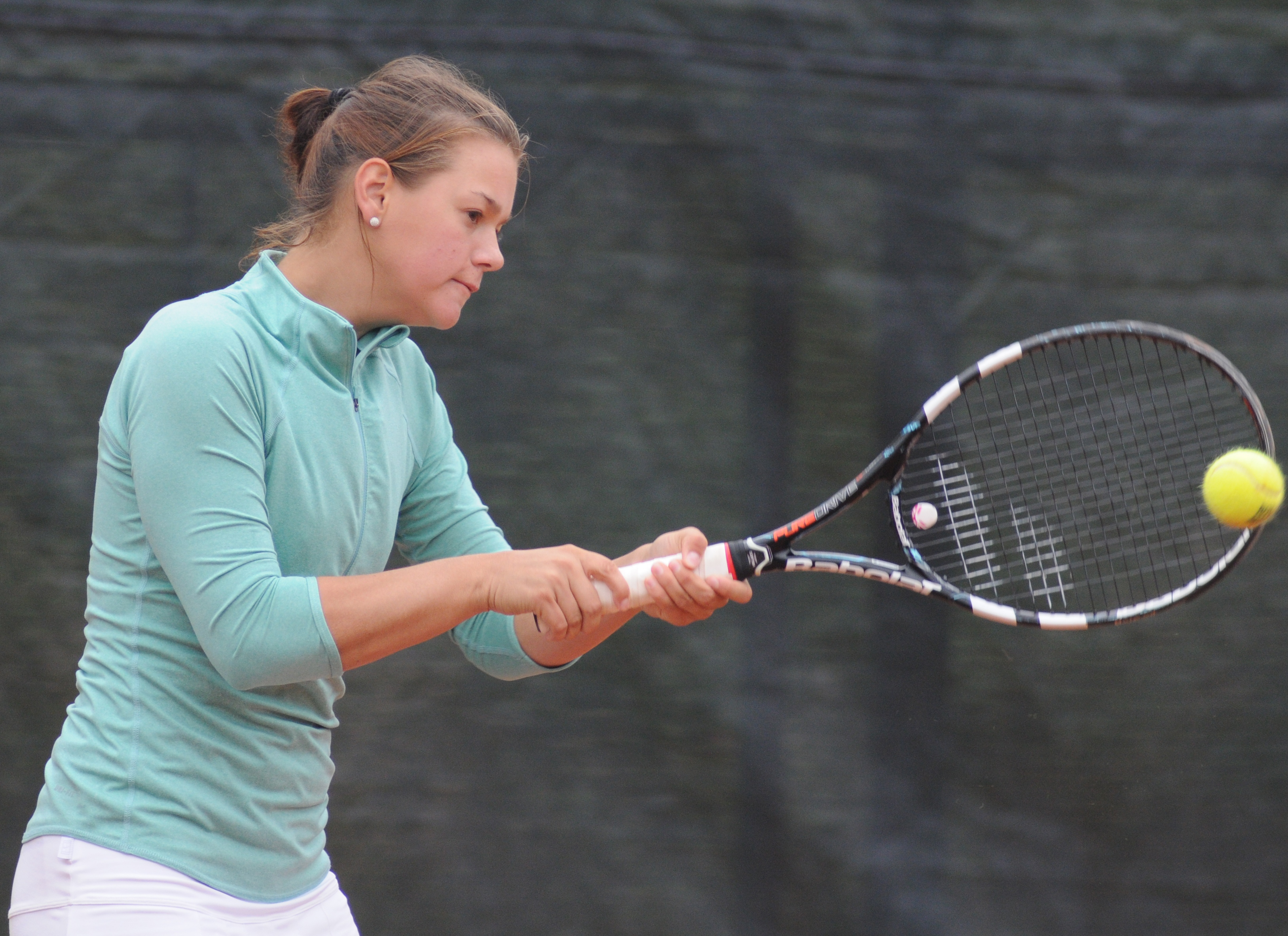
- Frolova in 2014
- Country (sports): Russia
- Born: 21 June 1994 (age 32) Moscow
- Plays: Right-handed (two-handed backhand)
- Coach: Mikhail Chesalov
- Prize money: $58,323

Singles
- Career record: 154–103
- Career titles: 1 ITF
- Highest ranking: No. 298 (6 November 2017)

Doubles
- Career record: 113–64
- Career titles: 11 ITF
- Highest ranking: No. 251 (10 September 2018)

Anastasia Alexandrovna Frolova (born 21 June 1994) is a Russian former professional tennis player.

On 6 November 2017, Frolova reached her best singles ranking of world No. 298. On 10 September 2018, she peaked at No. 251 in the doubles rankings. In her career, she won one singles title and eleven doubles titles on the ITF Women's Circuit.

Frolova was given a wildcard into the doubles main draw of the 2012 Kremlin Cup, partnering with Margarita Gasparyan.

== ITF Circuit finals ==
=== Singles: 4 (1 title, 3 runner-ups) ===
Legend $25,000 tournaments $10,000 tournaments	Finals by surface Hard (1–3)

Result	Date	Tournament	Surface	Opponent	Score
Loss	Jun 2015	Kazan Open, Russia	Hard	(Russia) Daria Mironova	7–5, 0–6, 6–7^{(5)}
Win	Nov 2016	ITF Minsk, Belarus	Hard (i)	(Russia) Anna Kalinskaya	w/o
Loss	Jun 2017	ITF Andijan, Uzbekistan	Hard	(Russia) Ksenia Lykina	4–6, 6–3, 4–6
Loss	Jun 2018	Fergana Challenger, Uzbekistan	Hard	(Uzbekistan) Nigina Abduraimova	3–6, 0–2 ret.

=== Doubles: 19 (11 titles, 8 runner-ups) ===
Legend $25,000 tournaments $15,000 tournaments $10,000 tournaments	Finals by surface Hard (5–5) Clay (6–3)

Result	W–L	Date	Tournament	Surface	Partner	Opponents	Score
Win	1–0	15 August 2011	ITF St. Petersburg, Russia	Clay	(Russia) Polina Vinogradova	(Russia) Tatiana Kotelnikova (Russia) Maria Zharkova	6–2, 6–2
Win	2–0	14 January 2012	ITF Antalya, Turkey	Clay	(Russia) Eugeniya Pashkova	(Romania) Patricia Chirea (Romania) Patricia Maria Țig	6–4, 7–6^{(2)}
Loss	2–1	25 August 2014	Tatarstan Open, Russia	Hard	(Russia) Kseniia Bekker	(Russia) Natela Dzalamidze (Russia) Alena Tarasova	1–6, 1–6
Win	3–1	7 June 2015	Kazan Open, Russia	Hard	(Russia) Yana Sizikova	(Russia) Aida Kalimullina (Russia) Ekaterina Yashina	6–2, 6–3
Loss	3–2	10 August 2015	ITF Kazan, Russia	Hard	(Uzbekistan) Polina Merenkova	(Ukraine) Oleksandra Korashvili (Russia) Polina Leykina	w/o
Loss	3–3	9 November 2015	ITF Minsk, Belarus	Hard (i)	(Russia) Ekaterina Yashina	(Turkey) Başak Eraydın (Russia) Veronika Kudermetova	3–6, 1–6
Loss	3–4	29 April 2016	ITF Shymkent, Kazakhstan	Clay	(Kazakhstan) Kamila Kerimbayeva	(Belarus) Ilona Kremen (Belarus) Sviatlana Pirazhenka	3–6, 4–6
Win	4–4	22 July 2016	ITF Astana, Kazakhstan	Hard	(Russia) Angelina Gabueva	(Belarus) Sviatlana Pirazhenka (Ukraine) Alyona Sotnikova	6–2, 6–3
Win	5–4	19 August 2016	ITF Moscow, Russia	Clay	(Russia) Margarita Lazareva	(Russia) Polina Novoselova (Russia) Aleksandra Pospelova	6–2, 6–0
Loss	5–5	3 March 2017	ITF Antalya, Turkey	Clay	(Russia) Alena Tarasova	(Romania) Georgia Crăciun (Romania) Ilona Georgiana Ghioroaie	1–6, 4–6
Win	6–5	12 March 2017	ITF Antalya, Turkey	Clay	(Russia) Alena Tarasova	(Czech Republic) Barbora Miklová (Czech Republic) Karolína Muchová	7–5, 6–1
Win	7–5	18 March 2017	ITF Antalya, Turkey	Clay	(Russia) Alena Tarasova	(Bulgaria) Dia Evtimova (Bosnia and Herzegovina) Jasmina Tinjić	7–5, 6–1
Win	8–5	24 June 2017	Fergana Challenger, Uzbekistan	Hard	(Uzbekistan) Nigina Abduraimova	(Russia) Ksenia Lykina (Uzbekistan) Sabina Sharipova	7–6^{(7)}, 7–5
Loss	8–6	16 March 2018	Kazan Open, Russia	Hard (i)	(Russia) Ksenia Lykina	(Russia) Alena Fomina (Russia) Elena Rybakina	4–6, 6–1, [6–10]
Win	9–6	27 April 2018	ITF Qarshi, Uzbekistan	Hard	(Uzbekistan) Nigina Abduraimova	(Russia) Anastasia Gasanova (Russia) Ekaterina Yashina	7–6^{(7)}, 6–1
Win	10–6	23 June 2018	Fergana Challenger, Uzbekistan	Hard	(Russia) Ekaterina Yashina	(Russia) Sofya Lansere (Russia) Kamilla Rakhimova	6–1, 7–6^{(4)}
Win	11–6	17 August 2018	ITF Moscow, Russia	Clay	(Russia) Anna Morgina	(Russia) Anastasia Kharitonova (Russia) Daria Nazarkina	6–3, 6–4
Loss	11–7	24 August 2018	ITF Moscow, Russia	Clay	(Russia) Anna Morgina	(Russia) Vlada Koval (Moldova) Vitalia Stamat	6–7^{(5)}, 7–5, [6–10]
Loss	11–8	4 May 2019	ITF Khimki, Russia	Hard (i)	(Russia) Sofya Lansere	(United Kingdom) Freya Christie (Russia) Ekaterina Yashina	3–6, 3–6
