= 2013 Kazan Summer Cup – Men's doubles =

Men's doubles
- 2013 Kazan Summer Cup

Final
- Champions: (Russia) Victor Baluda (Russia) Konstantin Kravchuk
- Runners-up: (Slovakia) Ivo Klec (Estonia) Jürgen Zopp
- Score: 6–3, 6–4

Events
Singles	men	women
Doubles	men	women
← 2012 ·	Kazan Summer Cup	· 2014 →

Sanchai Ratiwatana and Sonchat Ratiwatana were the defending champions, but they decided not to compete this year.

== Seeds ==
1. (Republic of Ireland) James Cluskey / (Austria) Maximilian Neuchrist (semifinals)
2. (Russia) Victor Baluda / (Russia) Konstantin Kravchuk (champions)
3. (Russia) Mikhail Elgin / (Russia) Alexander Kudryavtsev (semifinals)
4. (Czech Republic) Michal Konečný / (Poland) Michał Przysiężny (withdrew)

== Draw ==
=== Key ===
- Q = Qualifier
- WC = Wild card
- LL = Lucky loser
- Alt = Alternate
- SE = Special exempt
- PR = Protected ranking
- ITF = ITF entry
- JE = Junior exempt
- w/o = Walkover
- r = Retired
- d = Defaulted
- SR = Special ranking

=== Draw ===
First round
1	(Republic of Ireland) J Cluskey (Austria) M Neuchrist	7^{8}	6^{7}	[11]
(Russia) Alexander Lobkov (Belarus) D Zhyrmont	6^{6}	7^{9}	[9]
(Bosnia and Herzegovina) D Džumhur (Serbia) D Petrović	5	4
(Czech Republic) Michal Schmid (Slovakia) Adrian Sikora	7	6
4	(Czech Republic) Michal Konečný (Poland) M Przysiężny
(Slovakia) I Klec (Estonia) J Zopp	w/o
WC	(Russia) Aydin Akhmetshin (Russia) Daniyal Zagidullin	1	4
WC	(Russia) Evgeny Elistratov (Russia) Vladimir Polyakov	6	6
WC	(Russia) Timur Kiuamov (Russia) Andrey Saveliev	1	3
(Russia) D Matsukevich (Netherlands) B Westerhof	6	6
(Russia) E Karlovskiy (Croatia) L Zovko	2	2
3	(Russia) M Elgin (Russia) A Kudryavtsev	6	6
(Russia) I Nedelko (Russia) Mikhail Vaks	1	4
(Russia) A Karatsev (Russia) Alexander Rumyantsev	6	6
(Russia) Mikhail Fufygin (Russia) Vitaliy Kachanovskiy	7^{8}	3	[8]
2	(Russia) V Baluda (Russia) K Kravchuk	6^{6}	6	[10]

Quarterfinals
1	(Republic of Ireland) J Cluskey (Austria) M Neuchrist	6	6
(Czech Republic) M Schmid (Slovakia) A Sikora	2	2
(Slovakia) I Klec (Estonia) J Zopp	6	3	[10]
WC	(Russia) E Elistratov (Russia) V Polyakov	4	6	[6]
(Russia) D Matsukevich (Netherlands) B Westerhof	1	1
3	(Russia) M Elgin (Russia) A Kudryavtsev	6	6
(Russia) A Karatsev (Russia) A Rumyantsev	3	3
2	(Russia) V Baluda (Russia) K Kravchuk	6	6

Semifinals
1	(Republic of Ireland) J Cluskey (Austria) M Neuchrist	7	3	[4]
(Slovakia) I Klec (Estonia) J Zopp	5	6	[10]
3	(Russia) M Elgin (Russia) A Kudryavtsev	6	4	[5]
2	(Russia) V Baluda (Russia) K Kravchuk	2	6	[10]

Final
(Slovakia) I Klec (Estonia) J Zopp	3	4
2	(Russia) V Baluda (Russia) K Kravchuk	6	6
