= 2013 Kazan Summer Cup =

- Date: 10–18 August
- Edition: 1st
- Draw: 32S/16D
- Prize money: $50,000 (each)
- Surface: Hard
- Location: Kazan, Russia

Champions

Men's singles
- (Ukraine) Sergiy Stakhovsky

Women's singles
- (Ukraine) Lyudmyla Kichenok

Men's doubles
- (Russia) Victor Baluda / (Russia) Konstantin Kravchuk

Women's doubles
- (Russia) Veronika Kudermetova / (Russia) Evgeniya Rodina
- Kazan Summer Cup

The 2013 Kazan Summer Cup was a professional tennis tournament played on outdoor hard courts. It was the first edition of the tournament which was part of the 2013 ATP Challenger Tour and 2013 ITF Women's Circuit, offering a total of $100,000 in prize money. It took place in Kazan, Russia, on 10–18 August 2013.

== Men's singles entrants ==
=== Seeds ===
Country	Player	Rank^{1}	Seed
UKR	Sergiy Stakhovsky	95	1
POL	Michał Przysiężny	105	2
ITA	Matteo Viola	141	3
RUS	Konstantin Kravchuk	172	4
BIH	Damir Džumhur	205	5
BLR	Dzmitry Zhyrmont	208	6
EST	Jürgen Zopp	228	7
NED	Boy Westerhof	242	8

- ^{1} Rankings as of 5 August 2013

=== Other entrants ===
The following players received wildcards into the singles main draw:

- (Russia) Aydin Akhmetshin
- (Russia) Evgeny Karlovskiy
- (Russia) Timur Kiuamov
- (Russia) Vladimir Polyakov

The following players received entry from the qualifying draw:

- (Russia) Mikhail Elgin
- (Russia) Evgeny Elistratov
- (Russia) Sergey Strelkov
- (Russia) Mikhail Vaks

The following players received entry as lucky losers:

- (Russia) Mikhail Fufygin
- (Russia) Denis Matsukevich

== Women's singles entrants ==
=== Seeds ===
Country	Player	Rank^{1}	Seed
UKR	Kateryna Kozlova	177	1
RUS	Marta Sirotkina	192	2
RUS	Arina Rodionova	216	3
BLR	Ilona Kremen	218	4
NED	~~Richèl Hogenkamp~~	~~224~~	~~5~~
UKR	Tetyana Arefyeva	247	6
BLR	Aliaksandra Sasnovich	248	7
UKR	Lyudmyla Kichenok	249	8
UKR	Valentyna Ivakhnenko	259	9

- ^{1} Rankings as of 5 August 2013

=== Other entrants ===
The following players received wildcards into the singles main draw:

- (Russia) Aida Kalimullina
- (Russia) Veronika Kudermetova
- (Russia) Evgeniya Rodina
- (Russia) Ekaterina Yashina

The following players received entry from the qualifying draw:

- (Russia) Alexandra Artamonova
- (Czech Republic) Martina Borecká
- (Russia) Marina Shamayko
- (Ukraine) Anna Shkudun

The following player received entry into the singles main draw as a lucky loser:

- (Australia) Alison Bai

== Champions ==
=== Men's singles ===
- (Ukraine) Sergiy Stakhovsky def. (Russia) Valery Rudnev 6–2, 6–3

=== Women's singles ===
- (Ukraine) Lyudmyla Kichenok def. (Ukraine) Valentyna Ivakhnenko 6–2, 2–6, 6–2

=== Men's doubles ===
- (Russia) Victor Baluda / (Russia) Konstantin Kravchuk def. (Slovakia) Ivo Klec / (Estonia) Jürgen Zopp 6–3, 6–4

=== Women's doubles ===
- (Russia) Veronika Kudermetova / (Russia) Evgeniya Rodina def. (Russia) Alexandra Artamonova / (Czech Republic) Martina Borecká 5–7, 6–0, [10–8]
