= 2013 Kazan Summer Cup – Women's singles =

Women's singles
- 2013 Kazan Summer Cup

Final
- Champion: (Ukraine) Lyudmyla Kichenok
- Runner-up: (Ukraine) Valentyna Ivakhnenko
- Score: 6–2, 2–6, 6–2

Events
Singles	men	women
Doubles	men	women
← 2012 ·	Kazan Summer Cup	· 2014 →

This was a new event on the 2013 ITF Women's Circuit.

Lyudmyla Kichenok won the tournament, defeating Valentyna Ivakhnenko in the final, 6–2, 2–6, 6–2.

== Seeds ==
1. (Ukraine) Kateryna Kozlova (second round)
2. (Russia) Marta Sirotkina (second round)
3. (Russia) Arina Rodionova (first round)
4. (Belarus) Ilona Kremen (second round)
5. (Netherlands) ~~Richèl Hogenkamp~~ (withdrew)
6. (Ukraine) Tetyana Arefyeva (first round)
7. (Belarus) Aliaksandra Sasnovich (second round)
8. (Ukraine) Lyudmyla Kichenok (champion)
9. (Ukraine) Valentyna Ivakhnenko (final)

== Main draw ==
=== Key ===
- Q = Qualifier
- WC = Wild card
- LL = Lucky loser
- Alt = Alternate
- SE = Special exempt
- PR = Protected ranking
- ITF = ITF entry
- JE = Junior exempt
- w/o = Walkover
- r = Retired
- d = Defaulted
- SR = Special ranking

=== Finals ===
Semifinals
8	(Ukraine) Lyudmyla Kichenok	2	6	6
(Ukraine) Anastasiya Vasylyeva	6	1	4
WC	(Russia) Veronika Kudermetova	6^{3}	3
9	(Ukraine) Valentyna Ivakhnenko	7^{7}	6

Final
8	(Ukraine) Lyudmyla Kichenok	6	2	6
9	(Ukraine) Valentyna Ivakhnenko	2	6	2

=== Top half ===
First round
1	(Ukraine) K Kozlova	6	3	7^{7}
(Czech Republic) T Martincová	3	6	6^{4}
Q	(Russia) A Artamonova	1	2
WC	(Russia) E Rodina	6	6
(Russia) Y Kalabina	4	3
Q	(Ukraine) A Shkudun	6	6
WC	(Russia) A Kalimullina	0	2
8	(Ukraine) L Kichenok	6	6
4	(Belarus) I Kremen	6	6
LL	(Australia) A Bai	1	3
(Ukraine) A Vasylyeva	6	6
(Kyrgyzstan) K Palkina	4	2
(Ukraine) V Kapshay	6	7
(Poland) J Jegiołka	4	5
(Turkey) M Sezer	0	1
7	(Belarus) A Sasnovich	6	6

Second round
1	(Ukraine) K Kozlova	3	2
WC	(Russia) E Rodina	6	6
Q	(Ukraine) A Shkudun	1	5
8	(Ukraine) L Kichenok	6	7
4	(Belarus) I Kremen	6	3	3
(Ukraine) A Vasylyeva	1	6	6
(Ukraine) V Kapshay	6	6^{0}	6
7	(Belarus) A Sasnovich	3	7^{7}	3

Quarterfinals
WC	(Russia) E Rodina	4	3
8	(Ukraine) L Kichenok	6	6
(Ukraine) A Vasylyeva	6	7
(Ukraine) V Kapshay	4	5

Semifinals
8	(Ukraine) L Kichenok	2	6	6
(Ukraine) A Vasylyeva	6	1	4

=== Bottom half ===
First round
6	(Ukraine) T Arefyeva	2	5
(Russia) M Melnikova	6	7
(Russia) M Lazareva	6^{4}	5
(Russia) M Katsitadze	7^{7}	7
WC	(Russia) V Kudermetova	6	6
(Belarus) P Pehkova	2	0
Q	(Russia) M Shamayko	7	6
3	(Russia) A Rodionova	5	2
9	(Ukraine) V Ivakhnenko	6	6
(Turkey) B Eraydın	0	1
(Russia) M Gasparyan	2	0^{r}
Q	(Czech Republic) M Borecká	6	0
(Kazakhstan) A Danilina	6	6
WC	(Russia) E Yashina	2	3
(Russia) Y Buchina	2	3
2	(Russia) M Sirotkina	6	6

Second round
(Russia) M Melnikova	6	6
(Russia) M Katsitadze	4	3
WC	(Russia) V Kudermetova	6^{4}	6	6
Q	(Russia) M Shamayko	7^{7}	4	2
9	(Ukraine) V Ivakhnenko	6	3	6
Q	(Czech Republic) M Borecká	4	6	2
(Kazakhstan) A Danilina	1	7	7
2	(Russia) M Sirotkina	6	5	5

Quarterfinals
(Russia) M Melnikova	6	6^{1}	4
WC	(Russia) V Kudermetova	2	7^{7}	6
9	(Ukraine) V Ivakhnenko	6	7
(Kazakhstan) A Danilina	2	5

Semifinals
WC	(Russia) V Kudermetova	6^{3}	3
9	(Ukraine) V Ivakhnenko	7^{7}	6
