= 2013 Kazan Summer Cup – Men's singles =

Men's singles
- 2013 Kazan Summer Cup

Final
- Champions: (Ukraine) Sergiy Stakhovsky
- Runners-up: (Russia) Valery Rudnev
- Score: 6–2, 6–3

Events
Singles	men	women
Doubles	men	women
← 2012 ·	Kazan Summer Cup	· 2014 →

Jürgen Zopp was the defending champion.

== Seeds ==
1. (Ukraine) Sergiy Stakhovsky (champion)
2. (Poland) Michał Przysiężny (first round)
3. (Italy) Matteo Viola (quarterfinals, withdrew)
4. (Russia) Konstantin Kravchuk (semifinals)
5. (Bosnia and Herzegovina) Damir Džumhur (second round)
6. (Belarus) Dzmitry Zhyrmont (first round)
7. (Estonia) Jürgen Zopp (second round)
8. (Netherlands) Boy Westerhof (first round)

== Main draw ==
=== Key ===
- Q = Qualifier
- WC = Wild card
- LL = Lucky loser
- Alt = Alternate
- SE = Special exempt
- PR = Protected ranking
- ITF = ITF entry
- JE = Junior exempt
- w/o = Walkover
- r = Retired
- d = Defaulted
- SR = Special ranking

=== Finals ===
Semifinals
1	(Ukraine) Sergiy Stakhovsky	7^{7}	7^{7}
(Russia) Alexander Kudryavtsev	6^{3}	6^{2}
4	(Russia) Konstantin Kravchuk	6	5	5
(Russia) Valery Rudnev	3	7	7

Final
1	(Ukraine) Sergiy Stakhovsky	6	6
(Russia) Valery Rudnev	2	3

=== Top half ===
First round
1	(Ukraine) S Stakhovsky	6	6
LL	(Russia) Mikhail Fufygin	2	2
(Slovakia) I Klec	6	3	6
(South Korea) S-Y Jeong	6	6	1
(Russia) A Karatsev	6	6
(Russia) Alexander Rumyantsev	3	2
Q	(Russia) S Strelkov	1	4
5	(Bosnia and Herzegovina) D Džumhur	6	6
3	(Italy) M Viola	6	6
Q	(Russia) Evgeny Elistratov	3	2
Q	(Russia) Mikhail Vaks	6	6
WC	(Russia) Aydin Akhmetshin	3	3
(Russia) A Kudryavtsev	6	6
(Austria) M Neuchrist	2	3
Q	(Russia) M Elgin	7^{7}	6^{5}	0^{r}
7	(Estonia) J Zopp	6^{5}	7^{7}	2

Second round
1	(Ukraine) S Stakhovsky	6	6
(Slovakia) I Klec	3	2
(Russia) A Karatsev	1	6	6
5	(Bosnia and Herzegovina) D Džumhur	6	2	4
3	(Italy) M Viola	6	6
Q	(Russia) M Vaks	0	3
(Russia) A Kudryavtsev	3	6	6
7	(Estonia) J Zopp	6	4	1

Quarterfinals
1	(Ukraine) S Stakhovsky	7	6
(Russia) A Karatsev	5	3
3	(Italy) M Viola
(Russia) A Kudryavtsev	w/o

Semifinals
1	(Ukraine) S Stakhovsky	7^{7}	7^{7}
(Russia) A Kudryavtsev	6^{3}	6^{2}

=== Bottom half ===
First round
8	(Netherlands) B Westerhof	3	7	3
(Czech Republic) Michal Schmid	6	5	6
(Slovakia) Adrian Sikora	6	2	6
WC	(Russia) Vladimir Polyakov	4	6	1
(Czech Republic) Michal Konečný	6	6
(Serbia) D Petrović	3	3
(Russia) V Baluda	3	6^{1}
4	(Russia) K Kravchuk	6	7^{7}
6	(Belarus) D Zhyrmont	6^{6}	6	3
(Russia) Alexander Lobkov	7^{8}	2	6
WC	(Russia) Timur Kiuamov	3	3
(Russia) I Nedelko	6	6
WC	(Russia) E Karlovskiy	4	1
(Russia) V Rudnev	6	6
LL	(Russia) D Matsukevich	6	3
2	(Poland) M Przysiężny	2	0^{r}

Second round
(Czech Republic) M Schmid	3	1
(Slovakia) A Sikora	6	6
(Czech Republic) M Konečný	5	4
4	(Russia) K Kravchuk	7	6
(Russia) A Lobkov	7	6
(Russia) I Nedelko	5	4
(Russia) V Rudnev	7	1	7^{7}
LL	(Russia) D Matsukevich	5	6	6^{4}

Quarterfinals
(Slovakia) A Sikora	3	3
4	(Russia) K Kravchuk	6	6
(Russia) A Lobkov
(Russia) V Rudnev	w/o

Semifinals
4	(Russia) K Kravchuk	6	5	5
(Russia) V Rudnev	3	7	7
