= 2021 in tennis =

This page covers all the important events in the sport of tennis in 2021. It provides the results of notable tournaments throughout the year on both the ATP and WTA Tours, the Davis Cup, and the Fed Cup.

The Covid-19 pandemic hugely impacted on the 2021 professional tennis tour.

== ITF ==
=== Grand Slam events ===
Category	Championship	Champions	Finalists	Score in the final
Men's singles	Australian Open	(Serbia) Novak Djokovic	(Russia) Daniil Medvedev	7–5, 6–2, 6–2
Men's singles	French Open	(Serbia) Novak Djokovic	(Greece) Stefanos Tsitsipas	6–7^{(6–8)}, 2–6, 6–3, 6–2, 6–4
Men's singles	Wimbledon	(Serbia) Novak Djokovic	(Italy) Matteo Berrettini	6–7^{(4–7)}, 6–4, 6–4, 6–3
Men's singles	US Open	(Russia) Daniil Medvedev	(Serbia) Novak Djokovic	6-4, 6-4, 6-4

Category	Championship	Champions	Finalists	Score in the final
Women's singles	Australian Open	(Japan) Naomi Osaka	(United States) Jennifer Brady	6–4, 6–3
Women's singles	French Open	(Czech Republic) Barbora Krejčíková	(Russia) Anastasia Pavlyuchenkova	6–1, 2–6, 6–4
Women's singles	Wimbledon	(Australia) Ashleigh Barty	(Czech Republic) Karolína Plíšková	6–3, 6–7^{(4–7)}, 6–3
Women's singles	US Open	(United Kingdom) Emma Raducanu	(Canada) Leylah Fernandez	6–4, 6–3

Category	Championship	Champions	Finalists	Score in the final
Men's Doubles	Australian Open	(Croatia) Ivan Dodig (Slovakia) Filip Polášek	(United States) Rajeev Ram (United Kingdom) Joe Salisbury	6–3, 6–4
Men's Doubles	French Open	(France) Pierre-Hugues Herbert (France) Nicolas Mahut	(Kazakhstan) Alexander Bublik (Kazakhstan) Andrey Golubev	4–6, 7–6^{(7–1)}, 6–4
Men's Doubles	Wimbledon	(Croatia) Nikola Mektić (Croatia) Mate Pavić	(Spain) Marcel Granollers (Argentina) Horacio Zeballos	6–4, 7–6^{(7–5)}, 2–6, 7–5
Men's Doubles	US Open	(United States) Rajeev Ram (United Kingdom) Joe Salisbury	(United Kingdom) Jamie Murray (Brazil) Bruno Soares	3–6, 6–2, 6–2

Category	Championship	Champions	Finalists	Score in the final
Women's Doubles	Australian Open	(Belgium) Elise Mertens (Belarus) Aryna Sabalenka	(Czech Republic) Barbora Krejčíková (Czech Republic) Kateřina Siniaková	6–2, 6–3
Women's Doubles	French Open	(Czech Republic) Barbora Krejčíková (Czech Republic) Kateřina Siniaková	(United States) Bethanie Mattek-Sands (Poland) Iga Świątek	6–4, 6–2
Women's Doubles	Wimbledon	(Chinese Taipei) Hsieh Su-wei (Belgium) Elise Mertens	(Russia) Veronika Kudermetova (Russia) Elena Vesnina	3–6, 7–5, 9–7
Women's Doubles	US Open	(Australia) Samantha Stosur (China) Zhang Shuai	(United States) Coco Gauff (United States) Caty McNally	6–3, 3–6, 6–3

Category	Championship	Champions	Finalists	Score in the final
Mixed Doubles	Australian Open	(Czech Republic) Barbora Krejčíková (United States) Rajeev Ram	(Australia) Samantha Stosur (Australia) Matthew Ebden	6–1, 6–4
Mixed Doubles	French Open	(United States) Desirae Krawczyk (United Kingdom) Joe Salisbury	(Russia) Elena Vesnina (Russia) Aslan Karatsev	2–6, 6–4, [10–5]
Mixed Doubles	Wimbledon	(United States) Desirae Krawczyk (United Kingdom) Neal Skupski	(United Kingdom) Harriet Dart (United Kingdom) Joe Salisbury	6–2, 7–6^{(7–1)}
Mixed Doubles	US Open	(United States) Desirae Krawczyk (United Kingdom) Joe Salisbury	(Mexico) Giuliana Olmos (El Salvador) Marcelo Arévalo	7–5, 6–2

== IOC ==
=== 2020 Summer Olympics ===
- 24 July – 1 August 2021: Summer Olympics

Event	Category	Gold medalist	Silver medalist	Bronze medalist	Score in the final
2020 Summer Olympics	Men's Singles	(Germany) Alexander Zverev	(Russia) Karen Khachanov	(Spain) Pablo Carreño Busta	6–3, 6–1
2020 Summer Olympics	Women's Singles	(Switzerland) Belinda Bencic	(Czech Republic) Markéta Vondroušová	(Ukraine) Elina Svitolina	7–5, 2–6, 6–3
2020 Summer Olympics	Men's Doubles	(Croatia) Nikola Mektić (Croatia) Mate Pavić	(Croatia) Marin Čilić (Croatia) Ivan Dodig	(New Zealand) Marcus Daniell (New Zealand) Michael Venus	6–4, 3–6, [10–6]
2020 Summer Olympics	Women's Doubles	(Czech Republic) Barbora Krejčíková (Czech Republic) Kateřina Siniaková	(Switzerland) Belinda Bencic (Switzerland) Viktorija Golubic	(Brazil) Laura Pigossi (Brazil) Luisa Stefani	7–5, 6–1
2020 Summer Olympics	Mixed Doubles	(Russia) Anastasia Pavlyuchenkova (Russia) Andrey Rublev	(Russia) Elena Vesnina (Russia) Aslan Karatsev	(Australia) Ashleigh Barty (Australia) John Peers	6–3, 6–7^{(5–7)}, [13–11]
