= Shelly Bereznyak =

Israeli tennis player

- Native name: שלי ברזניאק
- Country (sports): Israel
- Born: 10 July 2000 (age 25) Bat Yam, Israel
- Plays: Right-handed (two-handed backhand)
- Prize money: $12,560

Singles
- Career record: 61–57
- Career titles: 0
- Highest ranking: No. 790 (September 16, 2019)

Doubles
- Career record: 13–28
- Career titles: 0
- Highest ranking: No. 650 (July 22, 2019)

Team competitions
- Fed Cup: 2–0
- Last updated on: 11 July 2023.

Shelly Bereznyak (Hebrew: שלי ברזניאק; born 10 July 2000) is an inactive Israeli tennis player.

Bereznyak has a career-high singles ranking by the WTA of 790, achieved on 16 September 2019. She also has a career-high WTA doubles ranking of 650, achieved on 22 July 2019.

Bereznyak represents Israel in the Fed Cup.

== ITF Circuit finals ==
Legend
$100,000 tournaments
$80,000 tournaments
$60,000 tournaments
$25,000 tournaments
$15,000 tournaments

=== Doubles: 2 (2 runner–ups) ===
Result	W–L	Date	Tournament	Tier	Surface	Partner	Opponents	Score
Loss	0–1	Jun 2019	ITF Akko, Israel	25,000	Hard	(Kazakhstan) Yekaterina Dmitrichenko	(Croatia) Silvia Njirić (Turkey) İpek Soylu	2–6, 0–6
Loss	0–2	Jun 2019	ITF Netanya, Israel	15,000	Hard	(Israel) Lina Glushko	(Kazakhstan) Yekaterina Dmitrichenko (Russia) Anastasia Zakharova	0–6, 4–6
