= Kazan Open =

Defunct tennis tournament
- Event name: Kazan
- Location: Kazan, Russia
- Venue: Kazan Tennis Academy
- Surface: Hard
- Website: Official website
ATP Tour
- Category: ATP Challenger Tour
- Draw: 32S / 32Q / 16D
- Prize money: $75,000+H
WTA Tour
- Category: ITF Women's Circuit
- Draw: 32S / 32Q / 16D
- Prize money: $15,000

The Kazan Open is a professional tennis tournament played on outdoor hard courts. The event is part of the ITF Women's Circuit, and in its inaugural year, 2013, the Association of Tennis Professionals (ATP) Challenger Tour.

== Past finals ==
=== Women's singles ===
Year	Champion	Runner-up	Score
2019–20	Not Held		
2018	(Russia) Elena Rybakina	(Russia) Daria Nazarkina	6–4, 7–6^{(7–5)}
2017	Not Held		
2016	(Russia) Amina Anshba	(Russia) Anastasia Gasanova	5–7, 6–1, 6–0
2015	(Russia) Daria Mironova	(Russia) Anastasia Frolova	5–7, 6–0, 7–6^{(7–5)}
2014	(Russia) Alena Tarasova	(Russia) Polina Monova	6–1, 7–6^{(7–3)}
2013	(Ukraine) Lyudmyla Kichenok	(Ukraine) Valentyna Ivakhnenko	6–2, 2–6, 6–2

=== Women's doubles ===
Year	Champions	Runners-up	Score
2019–20	Not Held		
2018	(Russia) Alena Fomina (Russia) Elena Rybakina	(Russia) Anastasia Frolova (Russia) Ksenia Lykina	6–4, 1–6, [10–6]
2017	Not Held		
2016	(Russia) Olga Doroshina (Russia) Yana Sizikova	(Russia) Amina Anshba (Russia) Angelina Gabueva	6–4, 6–7^{(8–10)}, [10–5]
2015	(Russia) Anastasia Frolova (Russia) Yana Sizikova	(Russia) Aida Kalimullina (Russia) Ekaterina Yashina	6–2, 6–3
2014	(Russia) Margarita Lazareva (Belarus) Lidziya Marozava	(Russia) Polina Novoselova (Russia) Sofia Smagina	6–1, 0–6, [10–6]
2013	(Russia) Veronika Kudermetova (Russia) Evgeniya Rodina	(Russia) Alexandra Artamonova (Czech Republic) Martina Borecká	5–7, 6–0, [10–8]

=== Men's singles ===
Year	Champion	Runner-up	Score
2013	(Ukraine) Sergiy Stakhovsky	(Russia) Valery Rudnev	6–2, 6–3

=== Men's doubles ===
Year	Champions	Runners-up	Score
2013	(Russia) Victor Baluda (Russia) Konstantin Kravchuk	(Slovakia) Ivo Klec (Estonia) Jürgen Zopp	6–3, 6–4
