= Nicole Nadel =

Israeli tennis player (born 2000)

- Native name: ניקול נדל
- Country (sports): Israel
- Born: 12 June 2000 (age 26) Israel
- Prize money: $25,657

Singles
- Career record: 63–61
- Career titles: 0
- Highest ranking: No. 707 (12 November 2018)

Doubles
- Career record: 21–37
- Career titles: 0
- Highest ranking: No. 593 (21 November 2022)

Team competitions
- Fed Cup: 0–1
- Last updated on: 21 April 2018.

Nicole Nadel (Hebrew: ניקול נדל; born 12 June 2000) is an Israeli former tennis player.

Nadel has a career-high WTA singles ranking of 707, achieved on 12 November 2018. She also has a career-high WTA doubles ranking of 872 achieved on 9 September 2019.

Nadel has represented Israel in Fed Cup, where she has a win-loss record of 0–1.

== ITF Finals ==
=== Singles ===
| Result | Date | Tournament | Tier | Surface | Opponent | Score |
|---|---|---|---|---|---|---|
| Loss | Jun 2018 | Tel Aviv, Israel | 15,000 | Hard | (Romania) Elena-Teodora Cadar | 6-3, 1–6, 4–6 |
| Loss | Jun 2018 | Kiryat Shmona, Israel | 15,000 | Hard | (Israel) Maya Tahan | 6-7, 5–7 |

=== Doubles ===
| Result | Date | Tournament | Tier | Surface | Partner | Opponents | Score |
|---|---|---|---|---|---|---|---|
| Loss | May 2022 | Netanya, Israel | 25,000 | Hard | (United Kingdom) Emilie Lindh | (Japan) Haruna Arakawa (Japan) Natsuho Arakawa | 2–6, 4–6 |
