= Ekaterina Yashina =

Russian tennis player (born 1993)

- Full name: Ekaterina Yuryevna Yashina
- Country (sports): Russia
- Born: 6 August 1993 (age 33) Saratov, Russia
- Height: 1.73 m (5 ft 8 in)
- Plays: Right (two-handed backhand)
- Prize money: $360,190

Singles
- Career record: 468–477
- Career titles: 5 ITF
- Highest ranking: No. 335 (7 January 2019)
- Current ranking: No. 518 (26 October 2026)

Doubles
- Career record: 500–419
- Career titles: 41 ITF
- Highest ranking: No. 129 (30 January 2023)
- Current ranking: No. 260 (26 October 2026)
- Last updated on: 29 October 2026.

Ekaterina Yuryevna Yashina (Russian: Екатерина Юрьевна Яшина, IPA: [jɪkətʲɪˈrʲinə ˈjaʂɨnə]; born 6 August 1993) is a professional Russian tennis player. On 7 January 2019, she reached her career-high singles ranking of world No. 335, whilst her best WTA doubles ranking is 129, achieved on 30 January 2023.

== Career ==
She made her WTA Tour debut at the 2011 Tashkent Open gaining entry thanks to a wildcard with partner Sabina Sharipova.

She made her WTA Tour singles main-draw debut at the 2021 Bad Homburg Open in Bad Homburg, where she received entry into the tournament as a qualifier.

In November 2022, at the W25 Kiryat Motzkin tournament in Israel along with Dutch player Jasmijn Gimbrère, she reached the final. She became the champion in doubles with her Greek partner Valentini Grammatikopoulou at the W60 Meitar Open in Israel.

=== 2024 ===
In July, she competed in the doubles final at the Open de Montpellier in France. In August, she won the fifth singles title in her career in Tbilisi, Georgia.

In September, she reached the semifinals of the 2024 Jasmin Open held in Monastir, Tunisia, with her Bosnian partner Anita Wagner. In October, they played in the semifinals of the WTA Tour 2024 Jiangxi Open with compatriot Elena Pridankina. In the semifinal, they were defeated by Polish Katarzyna Piter and Hungarian Fanny Stollár in two sets.

=== 2025–2026 ===
In February 2025, she received a wildcard with her Japanese partner Aoi Ito from the 2025 Dubai Open in the United Arab Emirates into the doubles tournament.

== WTA 125 finals ==
=== Doubles: 1 (runner-up) ===
Result	W–L	Date	Tournament	Surface	Partner	Opponents	Score
Loss	0–1	Jul 2021	Belgrade Challenger, Serbia	Clay	(Russia) Alena Fomina	(Belarus) Olga Govortsova (Belarus) Lidziya Marozava	2–6, 2–6

== ITF Circuit finals ==
Legend
W50/60/75 tournaments
W25/35 tournaments
W10/15 tournaments

=== Singles: 12 (5 titles, 7 runner-ups) ===
Result	W–L	Date	Tournament	Tier	Surface	Opponent	Score
Win	1–0	Mar 2011	ITF Astana, Kazakhstan	10k	Hard	(Russia) Maya Gaverova	6–7, 7–6, 6–4
Win	2–0	Apr 2011	ITF Qarshi, Uzbekistan	10k	Hard	(Georgia (country)) Sofia Kvatsabaia	6–2, 6–3
Loss	2–1	Mar 2012	ITF Astana, Kazakhstan	10k	Hard (i)	(Germany) Anna-Lena Friedsam	4–6, 3–6
Loss	2–2	Jun 2012	ITF Sharm El Sheikh, Egypt	10k	Hard	(Hong Kong) Venise Chan	7–6, 3–6, 4–6
Win	3–2	Feb 2013	ITF Shymkent, Kazakhstan	10k	Hard (i)	(Kyrgyzstan) Ksenia Palkina	6–3, 4–6, 6–2
Win	4–2	Nov 2014	ITF Astana, Kazakhstan	10k	Hard (i)	(Kazakhstan) Kamila Kerimbayeva	6–3, 6–4
Loss	4–3	Sep 2015	ITF Madrid, Spain	10k	Hard	(Spain) Cristina Sánchez Quintanar	2–6, 2–6
Loss	4–4	Nov 2017	ITF Stockholm, Sweden	15k	Hard (i)	(Denmark) Clara Tauson	3–6, 2–6
Loss	4–5	Feb 2021	ITF Villena, Spain	W15	Hard	(Brazil) Laura Pigossi	6–3, 0–6, 4–6
Loss	4–6	May 2021	ITF Jerusalem, Israel	W15	Hard	(Israel) Shavit Kimchi	4–6, 3–6
Win	5–6	Aug 2024	ITF Tbilisi, Georgia	W15	Hard	(Russia) Maria Sholokhova	6–2, 6–4
Loss	5–7	Apr 2026	ITF Panipat, India	W15	Hard	(Japan) Michika Ozeki	5–7, 6–4, 3–6

=== Doubles: 78 (41 titles, 37 runner-ups) ===
Result	W–L	Date	Tournament	Tier	Surface	Partnering	Opponents	Score
Loss	0–1	Nov 2010	ITF Minsk, Belarus	10k	Carpet (i)	(Ukraine) Oksana Pavlova	(Russia) Maria Zharkova (Russia) Eugeniya Pashkova	7–5, 5–7, 4–6
Win	1–1	Mar 2011	ITF Almaty, Kazakhstan	10k	Hard (i)	(Turkmenistan) Anastasiya Prenko	(Russia) Nadezda Gorbachkova (Russia) Ekaterina Pushkareva	6–4, 7–5
Loss	1–2	Apr 2011	ITF Qarshi, Uzbekistan	10k	Hard	(Ukraine) Anna Shkudun	(Uzbekistan) Albina Khabibulina (Uzbekistan) Nigina Abduraimova	1–6, 2–6
Win	2–2	Jun 2011	ITF Astana, Kazakhstan	25k	Hard	(Ukraine) Veronika Kapshay	(Serbia) Tamara Čurović (Uzbekistan) Sabina Sharipova	2–6, 6–3, [15–13]
Win	3–2	Nov 2011	ITF Monastir, Tunisia	10k	Hard	(Russia) Margarita Lazareva	(Serbia) Saska Gavrilovska (Serbia) Andjela Novcic	6–3, 6–2
Loss	3–3	Jan 2012	ITF Antalya, Turkey	10k	Clay	(Japan) Yumi Nakano	(Romania) Cristina Dinu (Romania) Andreea Mitu	w/o
Loss	3–4	Apr 2012	ITF Andijan, Uzbekistan	10k	Hard	(Uzbekistan) Sabina Sharipova	(Uzbekistan) Albina Khabibulina (Ukraine) Anastasiya Vasylyeva	0–6, 2–6
Win	4–4	May 2012	ITF Almaty, Kazakhstan	10k	Hard	(Uzbekistan) Sabina Sharipova	(Uzbekistan) Albina Khabibulina (Ukraine) Anastasiya Vasylyeva	6–4, 3–6, [10–3]
Win	5–4	May 2012	ITF Qarshi, Uzbekistan	10k	Hard	(Belarus) Darya Lebesheva	(Uzbekistan) Albina Khabibulina (Ukraine) Anastasiya Vasylyeva	7–6^{(5)}, 6–2
Loss	5–5	Jun 2012	ITF Sharm El Sheikh, Egypt	10k	Hard	(Russia) Polina Monova	(United Kingdom) Sabrina Bamburac (Serbia) Barbara Bonic	4–6, 6–7
Win	6–5	Jun 2012	ITF Sharm El Sheikh	10k	Hard	(Russia) Polina Monova	(Kazakhstan) Kamila Kerimbayeva (Kazakhstan) Zalina Khairudinova	7–5, 4–6, [10–8]
Loss	6–6	Jul 2012	ITF Astana, Kazakhstan	25k	Hard	(Ukraine) Veronika Kapshay	(Thailand) Luksika Kumkhum (Thailand) Varatchaya Wongteanchai	2–6, 4–6
Loss	6–7	Oct 2012	ITF Akko, Israel	10k	Hard	(Czech Republic) Nikola Fraňková	(Poland) Natalia Kołat (Poland) Olga Brózda	2–6, 4–6
Loss	6–8	Oct 2012	ITF Ashkelon, Israel	10k	Hard	(Czech Republic) Nikola Fraňková	(Poland) Natalia Kołat (Poland) Olga Brózda	6–7^{(11)}, 1–6
Win	7–8	Dec 2012	ITF Istanbul, Turkey	10k	Hard	(Belarus) Lidziya Marozava	(Georgia (country)) Ekaterine Gorgodze (Georgia (country)) Sofia Kvatsabaia	6–3, 6–2
Win	8–8	Jan 2013	ITF Sharm El Sheikh, Egypt	10k	Hard	(Russia) Eugeniya Pashkova	(Netherlands) Valeria Podda (Egypt) Mayar Sherif	3–6, 6–2, [10–3]
Loss	8–9	Feb 2013	ITF Sharm El Sheikh	10k	Hard	(Bulgaria) Aleksandrina Naydenova	(Poland) Katarzyna Kawa (Poland) Natalia Kołat	1–6, 4–6
Loss	8–10	Apr 2013	ITF Andijan, Uzbekistan	10k	Hard	(Russia) Polina Monova	(Ukraine) Anastasiya Vasylyeva (Uzbekistan) Albina Khabibulina	5–7, 4–6
Loss	8–11	Jun 2013	ITF Qarshi, Uzbekistan	10k	Hard	(Uzbekistan) Sabina Sharipova	(Uzbekistan) Albina Khabibulina (Ukraine) Alyona Sotnikova	3–6, 5–7
Win	9–11	Jun 2013	ITF Almaty, Kazakhstan	10k	Clay	(Russia) Margarita Lazareva	(Russia) Ivanka Karamalak (Russia) Anna Koval	7–5, 2–6, [10–3]
Loss	9–12	Apr 2014	ITF Dakar, Senegal	15k	Hard	(Switzerland) Conny Perrin	(South Africa) Chanel Simmonds (United Kingdom) Emily Webley-Smith	4–6, 5–7
Win	10–12	Aug 2014	ITF Astana, Kazakhstan	10k	Hard	(Russia) Polina Monova	(Belarus) Sviatlana Pirazhenka (Belarus) Polina Pekhova	6–3, 6–2
Win	11–12	Aug 2014	ITF Astana, Kazakhstan	10k	Hard	(Kyrgyzstan) Ksenia Palkina	(Hong Kong) Eudice Chong (Russia) Anna Grigoryan	7–5, 6–3
Loss	11–13	Oct 2014	ITF Sharm El Sheikh, Egypt	10k	Hard	(Egypt) Ola Abou Zekry	(Ukraine) Diana Bogoliy (Russia) Polina Leykina	3–6, 1–6
Loss	11–14	Nov 2014	ITF Astana, Kazakhstan	10k	Hard (i)	(Kazakhstan) Kamila Kerimbayeva	(Uzbekistan) Albina Khabibulina (Uzbekistan) Polina Merenkova	2–6, 2–6
Win	12–14	Mar 2015	ITF Sharm El Sheikh, Egypt	10k	Hard	(India) Prarthana Thombare	(Belarus) Vera Lapko (Belarus) Anhelina Kalita	6–4, 5–7, [10–6]
Loss	12–15	Apr 2015	ITF Dakar, Senegal	15k	Hard	(Switzerland) Conny Perrin	(Russia) Aminat Kushkhova (Russia) Margarita Lazareva	3–6, 2–6
Loss	12–16	Jun 2015	Kazan Open, Russia	10k	Hard	(Russia) Aida Kalimullina	(Russia) Anastasia Frolova (Russia) Yana Sizikova	2–6, 3–6
Win	13–16	Jun 2015	ITF Sakarya, Turkey	10k	Hard	(Serbia) Tamara Čurović	(Turkey) Başak Eraydın (Russia) Margarita Lazareva	4–6, 6–1, [10–6]
Win	14–16	Nov 2015	ITF Oslo, Norway	10k	Hard (i)	(Germany) Kim Grajdek	(Norway) Astrid Brune Olsen (Norway) Malene Helgø	6–2, 6–3
Loss	14–17	Nov 2015	ITF Minsk, Belarus	25k	Hard (i)	(Russia) Anastasia Frolova	(Turkey) Başak Eraydın (Russia) Veronika Kudermetova	3–6, 1–6
Loss	14–18	Nov 2015	ITF Zawada, Poland	25k	Carpet (i)	(Germany) Kim Grajdek	(Romania) Mihaela Buzărnescu (Poland) Justyna Jegiołka	2–6, 3–6
Loss	14–19	Jan 2016	ITF Aurangabad, India	25k	Clay	(Turkey) Melis Sezer	(Russia) Margarita Lazareva (Ukraine) Valeriya Strakhova	1–6, 6–7^{(2)}
Win	15–19	Mar 2016	ITF Sharm El Sheikh, Egypt	10k	Hard	(Ukraine) Alona Fomina	(Russia) Anastasiya Komardina (Russia) Anna Morgina	6–1, 4–6, [10–8]
Win	16–19	Mar 2016	ITF Sharm El Sheikh	10k	Hard	(Ukraine) Alona Fomina	(Russia) Anastasiya Komardina (Russia) Anna Morgina	7–6^{(2)}, 3–6, [10–8]
Loss	16–20	Oct 2016	Open de Touraine, France	50k	Hard (i)	(Romania) Alexandra Cadanțu	(Serbia) Ivana Jorović (Netherlands) Lesley Kerkhove	3–6, 5–7
Win	17–20	Dec 2016	ITF Ramat Gan, Israel	10k	Hard	(Israel) Vlada Ekshibarova	(Romania) Daiana Negreanu (Israel) Keren Shlomo	6–2, 7–6^{(4)}
Win	18–20	Dec 2016	ITF Ramat Gan, Israel	10k	Hard	(Israel) Vlada Ekshibarova	(Russia) Sofia Dmitrieva (Russia) Anna Pribylova	6–4, 6–3
Loss	18–21	Dec 2016	Ankara Cup, Turkey	50k	Hard (i)	(Uzbekistan) Sabina Sharipova	(Russia) Anna Blinkova (Belarus) Lidziya Marozava	6–4, 3–6, [9–11]
Loss	18–22	Feb 2017	ITF Moscow, Russia	25k	Hard (i)	(Netherlands) Bibiane Schoofs	(Belarus) Vera Lapko (Ukraine) Dayana Yastremska	5–7, 3–6
Loss	18–23	Mar 2017	ITF Gonesse, France	15k	Clay (i)	(Ukraine) Ganna Poznikhirenko	(Belarus) Ilona Kremen (Latvia) Diāna Marcinkēviča	1–6, 4–6
Win	19–23	Jul 2017	ITF Sharm El Sheikh, Egypt	15k	Hard	(India) Kanika Vaidya	(Australia) Ella Husrefovic (Republic of Ireland) Jennifer Timotin	6–4, 6–3
Loss	19–24	Oct 2017	ITF Istanbul, Turkey	25k	Hard (i)	(Turkey) İpek Öz	(Czech Republic) Petra Krejsová (Czech Republic) Jesika Malečková	4–6, 3–6
Loss	19–25	Jan 2018	ITF Sharm El Sheikh, Egypt	15k	Hard	(Russia) Anastasia Potapova	(New Zealand) Jade Lewis (New Zealand) Erin Routliffe	6–0, 5–7, [6–10]
Loss	19–26	Apr 2018	ITF Qarshi, Uzbekistan	25k	Hard	(Russia) Anastasia Gasanova	(Uzbekistan) Nigina Abduraimova (Russia) Anastasia Frolova	6–7^{(7)}, 1–6
Loss	19–27	Jun 2018	ITF Andijan, Uzbekistan	25k	Hard	(Russia) Anastasia Gasanova	(Belarus) Ilona Kremen (Belarus) Iryna Shymanovich	4–6, 4–6
Win	20–27	Jun 2018	ITF Namangan, Uzbekistan	25k	Hard	(Russia) Anastasia Gasanova	(Russia) Anna Morgina (Bulgaria) Julia Terziyska	6–3, 6–1
Win	21–27	Jun 2018	Fergana Challenger, Uzbekistan	25k	Hard	(Russia) Anastasia Frolova	(Russia) Sofya Lansere (Russia) Kamilla Rakhimova	6–1, 7–6^{(4)}
Loss	21–28	Dec 2018	ITF Solapur, India	25k	Hard	(United Kingdom) Sarah Beth Grey	(Japan) Miyabi Inoue (China) Lu Jiajing	3–6, 3–6
Win	22–28	Dec 2018	ITF Navi Mumbai, India	25k	Hard	(Uzbekistan) Albina Khabibulina	(Turkey) Berfu Cengiz (Indonesia) Jessy Rompies	6–2, 6–1
Loss	22–29	Jan 2019	ITF Kazan, Russia	W25	Hard (i)	(Russia) Alena Fomina	(Germany) Vivian Heisen (Ukraine) Ganna Poznikhirenko	4–6, 3–6
Win	23–29	May 2019	ITF Khimki, Russia	W25	Hard (i)	(United Kingdom) Freya Christie	(Russia) Anastasia Frolova (Russia) Sofya Lansere	6–3, 6–3
Win	24–29	Aug 2019	ITF Sezze, Italy	W25	Clay	(Kazakhstan) Anna Danilina	(Italy) Nuria Brancaccio (Italy) Federica Sacco	7–5, 6–4
Win	25–29	Dec 2019	ITF Pune, India	W25	Hard	(Norway) Ulrikke Eikeri	(Russia) Daria Mishina (Russia) Anna Morgina	1–6, 6–3, [10–5]
Win	26–29	Jan 2020	ITF Kazan, Russia	W25	Hard (i)	(Russia) Anastasia Zakharova	(Russia) Natela Dzalamidze (Russia) Yana Sizikova	6–2, 6–4
Loss	26–30	Feb 2021	ITF Manacor, Spain	W15	Hard	(Italy) Camilla Rosatello	(Portugal) Francisca Jorge (Netherlands) Stéphanie Visscher	7–6^{(4)}, 3–6, [2–10]
Loss	26–31	Apr 2021	ITF Shymkent, Kazakhstan	W15	Clay	(Uzbekistan) Sabina Sharipova	(Russia) Anzhelika Isaeva (Russia) Ekaterina Makarova	6–7^{(4)}, 3–6
Win	27–31	Jul 2021	ITF Astana, Kazakhstan	W25	Hard	(Georgia (country)) Mariam Bolkvadze	(Russia) Vlada Koval (Russia) Anastasia Tikhonova	7–6^{(7)}, 6–1
Win	28–31	Aug 2021	ITF Ourense, Spain	W25	Hard	(Chinese Taipei) Lee Ya-hsuan	(Spain) Alba Carrillo Marín (Lithuania) Justina Mikulskytė	6–2, 6–3
Win	29–31	Apr 2022	ITF Monastir, Tunisia	W15	Hard	(United States) Dasha Ivanova	(Nigeria) Oyinlomo Quadre (China) Yang Yidi	6–4, 6–7^{(1)}, [10–4]
Win	30–31	Sep 2022	ITF Almaty, Kazakhstan	W25	Clay	(Kazakhstan) Zhibek Kulambayeva	Amina Anshba; Sofya Lansere	7–6^{(4)}, 5–7, [10–8]
Win	31–31	Oct 2022	ITF Istanbul, Turkey	W25	Hard (i)	(Netherlands) Jasmijn Gimbrère	(Romania) Cristina Dinu (Georgia (country)) Sofia Shapatava	6–1, 3–6, [13–11]
Loss	31–32	Nov 2022	ITF Kiryat Motzkin, Israel	W25	Hard	(Netherlands) Jasmijn Gimbrère	(Poland) Weronika Falkowska; Ekaterina Reyngold	6–4, 4–6, [4–10]
Win	32–32	Nov 2022	Meitar Open, Israel	W60	Hard	(Greece) Valentini Grammatikopoulou	Anna Kubareva; Maria Timofeeva	6–3, 7–5
Loss	32–33	Nov 2022	ITF Solapur, India	W25	Hard	(Indonesia) Priska Madelyn Nugroho	(India) Ankita Raina (India) Prarthana Thombare	1–6, 2–6
Win	33–33	Dec 2022	ITF Navi Mumbai, India	W25	Hard	(Indonesia) Priska Madelyn Nugroho	(India) Ankita Raina (India) Prarthana Thombare	6–3, 6–1
Win	34–33	Jun 2023	ITF La Marsa, Tunisia	W25	Hard	Anastasia Gasanova	(Bulgaria) Isabella Shinikova (China) Wei Sijia	7–5, 6–7^{(1)}, [11–9]
Win	35–33	Oct 2023	ITF Istanbul, Turkey	W25	Hard	Anastasia Zakharova	(Slovenia) Dalila Jakupović (Bosnia and Herzegovina) Anita Wagner	6–3, 6–4
Loss	35–34	Jul 2024	Open de Montpellier, France	W75	Clay	Elena Pridankina	(Croatia) Mariana Dražić; Iryna Shymanovich	6–1, 4–6, [8–10]
Win	36–34	Jun 2025	ITF Bissy-Chambéry, France	W15	Hard	Ekaterina Ovcharenko	(France) Élise Renard (France) Louna Zoppas	6–2, 6–0
Win	37–34	Dec 2025	ITF New Delhi, India	W35	Hard	(Japan) Hiroko Kuwata	(India) Vaidehi Chaudhari (India) Zeel Desai	6–2, 6–3
Win	38–34	Mar 2026	ITF Nagpur, India	W15	Clay	(Kazakhstan) Zhibek Kulambayeva	Ksenia Laskutova; Elina Nepliy	5–7, 6–4, [10–6]
Win	39–34	Mar 2026	ITF Ch. Sambhaji Nagar, India	W15	Clay	(Kazakhstan) Zhibek Kulambayeva	(Germany) Anastasia Kuparev (Uzbekistan) Sevil Yuldasheva	6–1, 6–4
Loss	39–35	Mar 2026	ITF Panipat, India	W15	Hard	Ksenia Laskutova	(India) Akanksha Nitture (Japan) Michika Ozeki	6–0, 4–6, [5–10]
Win	40–35	Apr 2026	ITF New Delhi, India	W15	Hard	Ksenia Laskutova	Arina Arifullina (Japan) Michika Ozeki	6–4, 6–3
Loss	40–36	Jun 2026	ITF Zhengzhou, China	W35	Hard	(Kazakhstan) Sonja Zhiyenbayeva	(China) Huang Yujia (China) Zheng Wushuang	3–6, 2–6
Loss	40–37	Aug 2026	ITF Vigo, Spain	W35	Hard	(Kazakhstan) Sonja Zhiyenbayeva	(Spain) Victoria Gómez O'Hayon (Netherlands) Arantxa Rus	3–6, 4–6
Win	41–37	Oct 2026	ITF Monastir, Tunisia	W35	Hard	(Germany) Marie Vogt	(Turkey) Ada Kumru (Poland) Amelia Paszun	7–5, 2–6, [10–5]
