= Serbia Challenger Open =

MT:S Open powered by Sony Ericsson
- 2021 Belgrade Challenger

Defunct tennis tournament
- Event name: Belgrade Challenger
- Founded: 2002
- Abolished: 2021
- Location: Belgrade, Serbia
- Venue: Novak Tennis Center (formerly: SRPC Milan Gale Muškatirović)
- Surface: Clay / Outdoors
- Website: Serbia Open

Current champions (2021)
- Men's singles: (Spain) Roberto Carballés Baena
- Women's singles: (Slovakia) Anna Karolína Schmiedlová
- Men's doubles: (Argentina) Guillermo Durán (Argentina) Andrés Molteni
- Women's doubles: (Belarus) Olga Govortsova (Belarus) Lidziya Marozava
ATP Tour
- Category: Challenger 125
- Draw: 32S / 16Q / 16D
- Prize money: €132,280 (2021)
WTA Tour
- Category: WTA 125
- Draw: 32S / 8Q / 11D
- Prize money: US$115,000 (2021)

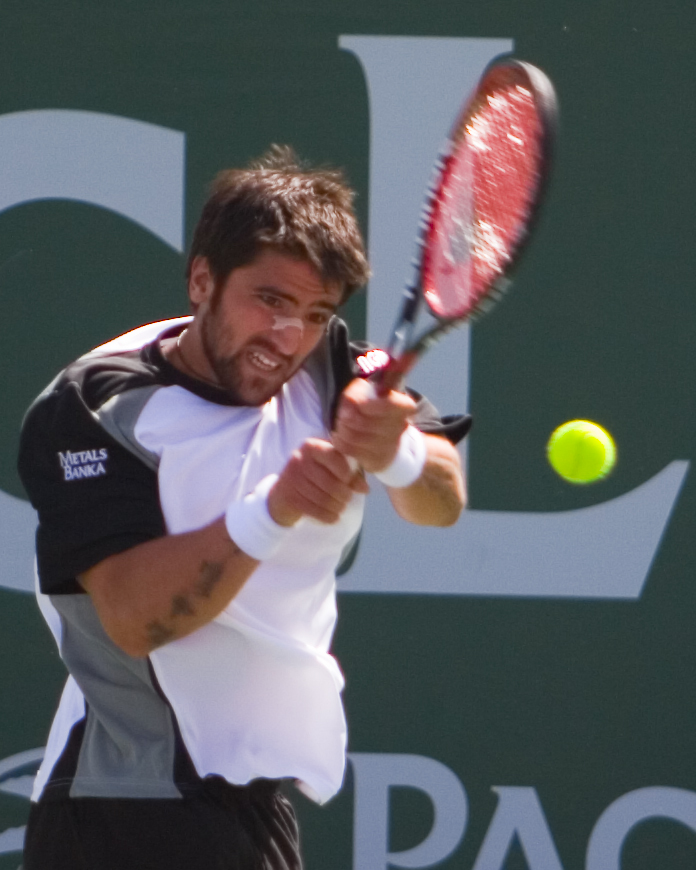
Doubles runner-up in 2003 and 2004, Janko Tipsarević won the singles in 2006

The MT:S Open powered by Sony Ericsson (previously the GEMAX Open) and also known as the Belgrade Challenger was a professional tennis tournament played on outdoor clay courts. It was part of the ATP Challenger Tour and the Challenger series of the WTA Tour. It was also part of the Tretorn SERIE+ of the Challenger Tour. It was held annually at the Tennis Club Gemax until 2010 before its relocation to the Novak Tennis Centre in 2021 in Belgrade, Serbia. The tournament was first played in 2002. A one-year women's edition was held in 2021.

== Past finals ==
=== Men's singles ===
Year	Champion	Runner-up	Score
2021	(Spain) Roberto Carballés Baena	(Bosnia and Herzegovina) Damir Džumhur	6–4, 7–5
2011–2020	Not Held		
2010	(Slovakia) Karol Beck	(Serbia) Ilija Bozoljac	7–5, 7–6(4)
2009	(Serbia) Viktor Troicki	(Slovakia) Dominik Hrbatý	6–4, 6–2
2008	(Croatia) Roko Karanušić	(Germany) Philipp Petzschner	5–7, 6–1, 7–6(5)
2007	Not Held		
2006	(Serbia and Montenegro) Janko Tipsarević	(Czech Republic) Tomáš Cakl	6–4, 4–1 retired
2005	(Belgium) Dick Norman	(Belgium) Jeroen Masson	6–2, 6–3
2004	(Serbia and Montenegro) Nenad Zimonjić	(Switzerland) Marco Chiudinelli	2–6, 7–6(3) 6–4
2003	(Netherlands) Dennis van Scheppingen	(Germany) Markus Hantschk	7–5, 6–3
2002	(Croatia) Mario Ančić	(Federal Republic of Yugoslavia) Nenad Zimonjić	6–2, 6–3

=== Women's singles ===
Year	Champion	Runner-up	Score
2021	(Slovakia) Anna Karolína Schmiedlová	(Netherlands) Arantxa Rus	6–3, 6–3

=== Men's doubles ===
Year	Champions	Runners-up	Score
2021	(Argentina) Guillermo Durán (Argentina) Andrés Molteni	(Bosnia and Herzegovina) Tomislav Brkić (Serbia) Nikola Ćaćić	6–4, 6–4
2011–2020	Not Held		
2010	(Serbia) Ilija Bozoljac (United Kingdom) Jamie Delgado	(Jamaica) Dustin Brown (Austria) Martin Slanar	6–3, 6–3
2009	(Germany) Michael Kohlmann (Germany) Philipp Marx	(Pakistan) Aisam-ul-Haq Qureshi (Croatia) Lovro Zovko	3–6, 6–2, 10–8
2008	(Italy) Flavio Cipolla (Greece) Konstantinos Economidis	(Italy) Alessandro Motti (Slovakia) Filip Polášek	4–6, 6–2, 10-8
2007	Not Held		
2006	(Germany) Michael Kohlmann (Germany) Alexander Waske	(Czech Republic) Ivo Minář (Czech Republic) Jan Minář	7–6(3), 6–3
2005	(Russia) Igor Kunitsyn (Ukraine) Orest Tereshchuk	(Czech Republic) Lukáš Dlouhý (Czech Republic) Jan Vacek	walkover
2004	(Slovakia) Branislav Sekáč (Ukraine) Orest Tereshchuk	(Serbia and Montenegro) Darko Mađarovski (Serbia and Montenegro) Janko Tipsarević	6–3, 6–4
2003	(Federal Republic of Yugoslavia) Ilija Bozoljac (Federal Republic of Yugoslavia) Nenad Zimonjić	(Federal Republic of Yugoslavia) Darko Mađarovski (Federal Republic of Yugoslavia) Janko Tipsarević	6–1, 6–4
2002	(Federal Republic of Yugoslavia) Dušan Vemić (Croatia) Lovro Zovko	(Czech Republic) Jaroslav Levinský (Czech Republic) Tomáš Zíb	walkover

=== Women's doubles ===
Year	Champions	Runners-up	Score
2021	(Belarus) Olga Govortsova (Belarus) Lidziya Marozava	(Russia) Alena Fomina (Russia) Ekaterina Yashina	6–2, 6–2
