= 2022 Elle Spirit Open =

Tennis tournament

- Date: 5–11 September 2022
- Edition: 5th
- Category: ITF Women's World Tennis Tour
- Prize money: $60,000
- Surface: Clay / Outdoor
- Location: Montreux, Switzerland

Champions

Singles
- (Germany) Tamara Korpatsch

Doubles
- (Algeria) Inès Ibbou / (Switzerland) Naïma Karamoko
← 2021 ·	Montreux Ladies Open	· 2023 →

The 2022 Elle Spirit Open was a professional tennis tournament played on outdoor clay courts. It was the fifth edition of the tournament which was part of the 2022 ITF Women's World Tennis Tour. It took place in Montreux, Switzerland between 5 and 11 September 2022.

== Champions ==
=== Singles ===
- (Germany) Tamara Korpatsch def. (United States) Emma Navarro, 6–4, 6–1

=== Doubles ===
- (Algeria) Inès Ibbou / (Switzerland) Naïma Karamoko def. (Switzerland) Jenny Dürst / (Poland) Weronika Falkowska 2–6, 6–3, [16–14]

== Singles main draw entrants ==
=== Seeds ===
Country	Player	Rank^{1}	Seed
NED	Arantxa Rus	95	1
FRA	Océane Dodin	98	2
GER	Tamara Korpatsch	139	3
USA	Emma Navarro	145	4
GER	Nastasja Schunk	166	5
FRA	Elsa Jacquemot	190	6
SUI	Stefanie Vögele	218	7
COL	Emiliana Arango	262	8

- ^{1} Rankings are as of 29 August 2022.

=== Other entrants ===
The following players received wildcards into the singles main draw:

- (Switzerland) Nadine Keller
- (Switzerland) Bojana Klincov
- (Switzerland) Leonie Küng
- (Switzerland) Valentina Ryser

The following player received entry into the singles main draw using a protected ranking:

- (Colombia) Emiliana Arango

The following players received entry from the qualifying draw:

- (Argentina) Berta Bonardi
- (Bulgaria) Dia Evtimova
- (Romania) Oana Gavrilă
- (Algeria) Inès Ibbou
- (Germany) Anna Klasen
- (Italy) Verena Meliss
- (United States) Chiara Scholl
- (Switzerland) Sebastianna Scilipoti
