= 2021 Elle Spirit Open – Doubles =

Doubles
- 2021 Elle Spirit Open

Final
- Champions: (France) Estelle Cascino (Italy) Camilla Rosatello
- Runners-up: (Switzerland) Conny Perrin (United Kingdom) Eden Silva
- Score: 7–6^{(7–4)}, 6–4

Events
Singles	Doubles
← 2019 ·	Montreux Ladies Open	· 2022 →

Xenia Knoll and Mandy Minella were the defending champions but Minella chose not to participate. Knoll partnered alongside Susan Bandecchi, but lost in the first round to Karola Bejenaru and Elizabeth Halbauer.

Estelle Cascino and Camilla Rosatello won the title, defeating Conny Perrin and Eden Silva in the final, 7–6^{(7–4)}, 6–4.

== Seeds ==
1. (Switzerland) Conny Perrin / (United Kingdom) Eden Silva (final)
2. (Switzerland) Susan Bandecchi / (Switzerland) Xenia Knoll (first round)
3. (France) Estelle Cascino / (Italy) Camilla Rosatello (champions)
4. (Russia) Angelina Gabueva / (United Kingdom) Sarah Beth Grey (semifinals)

== Draw ==
=== Key ===
- Q = Qualifier
- WC = Wild card
- LL = Lucky loser
- Alt = Alternate
- ITF = ITF entry
- PR = Protected ranking
- SR = Special ranking
- SE = Special exempt
- JE = Junior exempt
- JR = Junior Accelerator Programme entrant
- CO = College Accelerator Programme entrant
- NG = Next Gen Accelerator Program entrant
- w/o = Walkover
- r = Retired
- d = Defaulted

=== Draw ===
First round
(Serbia) D Joksović (Italy) C Traversi	3	4
(Switzerland) N Karamoko (Switzerland) T Sugnaux	6	6
4	(Russia) A Gabueva (United Kingdom) SB Grey	6	6
(Switzerland) MM Fiacan (Ukraine) E Grekul	2	1
(Japan) N Hanatani (Switzerland) J Züger	6	6
(Switzerland) K Kashaeva (Ukraine) M Kostiuk	1	0
(Switzerland) J Dürst (Switzerland) V Ryser	6	6
(Italy) E Chiesa (Italy) S Rubini	4	2
(Latvia) D Marcinkēviča (United States) C Scholl	2	2
3	(France) E Cascino (Italy) C Rosatello	6	6
(Switzerland) A Granwehr (Switzerland) N Stadler	6	4	[10]
(France) E Jacquemot (France) Y Mansouri	3	6	[6]
(Romania) K Bejenaru (United States) E Halbauer	6	6
2	(Switzerland) S Bandecchi (Switzerland) X Knoll	4	4

Quarterfinals
1	(Switzerland) C Perrin (United Kingdom) E Silva	6	6
(Switzerland) N Karamoko (Switzerland) T Sugnaux	2	1
4	(Russia) A Gabueva (United Kingdom) SB Grey	w/o
(Japan) N Hanatani (Switzerland) J Züger
(Switzerland) J Dürst (Switzerland) V Ryser	4	4
3	(France) E Cascino (Italy) C Rosatello	6	6
(Switzerland) A Granwehr (Switzerland) N Stadler	7^{7}	6
(Romania) K Bejenaru (United States) E Halbauer	6^{2}	1

Semifinals
1	(Switzerland) C Perrin (United Kingdom) E Silva	6	6
4	(Russia) A Gabueva (United Kingdom) SB Grey	2	2
3	(France) E Cascino (Italy) C Rosatello	6	7^{9}
(Switzerland) A Granwehr (Switzerland) N Stadler	1	6^{7}

Final
1	(Switzerland) C Perrin (United Kingdom) E Silva	6^{4}	4
3	(France) E Cascino (Italy) C Rosatello	7^{7}	6
