= 2019 Montreux Ladies Open =

- Date: 2–8 September 2019
- Edition: 3rd
- Category: ITF Women's World Tennis Tour
- Prize money: $60,000
- Surface: Clay
- Location: Montreux, Switzerland

Champions

Singles
- (Serbia) Olga Danilović

Doubles
- (Switzerland) Xenia Knoll / (Luxembourg) Mandy Minella
← 2018 ·	Montreux Ladies Open	· 2021 →

The 2019 Montreux Ladies Open was a professional tennis tournament played on outdoor clay courts. It was the third edition of the tournament which was part of the 2019 ITF Women's World Tennis Tour. It took place in Montreux, Switzerland between 2 and 8 September 2019.

== Singles main-draw entrants ==
=== Seeds ===
Country	Player	Rank^{1}	Seed
GER	Tamara Korpatsch	111	1
LUX	Mandy Minella	142	2
SUI	Conny Perrin	187	3
LAT	Diāna Marcinkēviča	205	4
SRB	Olga Danilović	218	5
SUI	Ylena In-Albon	235	6
BRA	Gabriela Cé	243	7
FRA	Tessah Andrianjafitrimo	265	8

- ^{1} Rankings are as of 26 August 2019.

=== Other entrants ===
The following players received wildcards into the singles main draw:

- (Switzerland) Valentina Ryser
- (Switzerland) Nina Stadler
- (Switzerland) Tess Sugnaux
- (Switzerland) Joanne Züger

The following players received entry from the qualifying draw:

- (France) Sara Cakarevic
- (Switzerland) Xenia Knoll
- (Italy) Verena Meliss
- (Switzerland) Svenja Ochsner
- (Kyrgyzstan) Ksenia Palkina
- (France) Marine Partaud

The following player received entry as a lucky loser:

- (Switzerland) Fiona Ganz

== Champions ==
=== Singles ===
- (Serbia) Olga Danilović def. (Austria) Julia Grabher, 6–2, 6–3

=== Doubles ===
- (Switzerland) Xenia Knoll / (Luxembourg) Mandy Minella def. (Switzerland) Ylena In-Albon / (Switzerland) Conny Perrin, 6–3, 6–4
