= 2022 Elle Spirit Open – Singles =

Singles
- 2022 Elle Spirit Open

Final
- Champion: (Germany) Tamara Korpatsch
- Runner-up: (United States) Emma Navarro
- Score: 6–4, 6–1

Events
Singles	Doubles
← 2021 ·	Montreux Ladies Open	· 2023 →

Tamara Korpatsch won the title, defeating Emma Navarro in the final, 6–4, 6–1.

Beatriz Haddad Maia was the defending champion but chose not to participate.

== Seeds ==
1. (Netherlands) Arantxa Rus (semifinals)
2. (France) Océane Dodin (semifinals)
3. (Germany) Tamara Korpatsch (champion)
4. (United States) Emma Navarro (final)
5. (Germany) Nastasja Schunk (first round)
6. (France) Elsa Jacquemot (quarterfinals)
7. (Switzerland) Stefanie Vögele (first round)
8. (Colombia) Emiliana Arango (first round)

== Draw ==
=== Key ===
- Q = Qualifier
- WC = Wild card
- LL = Lucky loser
- Alt = Alternate
- SE = Special exempt
- PR = Protected ranking
- ITF = ITF entry
- JE = Junior exempt
- w/o = Walkover
- r = Retired
- d = Defaulted
- SR = Special ranking

=== Finals ===
Semifinals
1	(Netherlands) Arantxa Rus	2	2
3	(Germany) Tamara Korpatsch	6	6
4	(United States) Emma Navarro	7	4	6
2	(France) Océane Dodin	5	6	4

Final
3	(Germany) Tamara Korpatsch	6	6
4	(United States) Emma Navarro	4	1

=== Top half ===
First round
1	(Netherlands) A Rus	6	6
WC	(Switzerland) N Keller	2	1
J Kolodynska	2	4
(Germany) M Barthel	6	6
Q	(Algeria) I Ibbou	6	6
(Switzerland) J Dürst	4	3
P Kudermetova	1	3
6	(France) E Jacquemot	6	6
3	(Germany) T Korpatsch	4	6	6
(Poland) W Falkowska	6	4	3
(Spain) Y Cavallé Reimers	6	7
Q	(Argentina) B Bonardi	2	5
Q	(Romania) O Gavrilă	6^{2}	6^{5}
Q	(Bulgaria) D Evtimova	7^{7}	7^{7}
(Latvia) D Marcinkēviča	6	6
7	(Switzerland) S Vögele	3	3

Second round
1	(Netherlands) A Rus	6	6
(Germany) M Barthel	2	4
Q	(Algeria) I Ibbou	2	4
6	(France) E Jacquemot	6	6
3	(Germany) T Korpatsch	7	6
(Spain) Y Cavallé Reimers	5	1
Q	(Bulgaria) D Evtimova	0	1
(Latvia) D Marcinkēviča	6	6

Quarterfinals
1	(Netherlands) A Rus	6	7
6	(France) E Jacquemot	2	5
3	(Germany) T Korpatsch	7	6
(Latvia) D Marcinkēviča	5	2

Semifinals
1	(Netherlands) A Rus	2	2
3	(Germany) T Korpatsch	6	6

=== Bottom half ===
First round
5	(Germany) N Schunk	1	7^{7}	1
Q	(United States) C Scholl	6	6^{3}	6
WC	(Switzerland) L Küng	2	3
(Switzerland) C Perrin	6	6
Q	(Italy) V Meliss	4	1
M Bondarenko	6	6
WC	(Switzerland) V Ryser	6	3	4
4	(United States) E Navarro	1	6	6
8/PR	(Colombia) E Arango	6^{1}	6	5
Q	(Switzerland) S Scilipoti	7^{7}	3	7
(Japan) C Muramatsu	6	6^{9}	6
(Switzerland) A Rushiti	4	7^{11}	0
Q	(Germany) A Klasen	6	7^{7}
WC	(Switzerland) B Klincov	3	6^{3}
(Czech Republic) M Bayerlová	1	4
2	(France) O Dodin	6	6

Second round
Q	(United States) C Scholl	7^{7}	6
(Switzerland) C Perrin	6^{5}	4
M Bondarenko	1	2
4	(United States) E Navarro	6	6
Q	(Switzerland) S Scilipoti	7^{7}	6
(Japan) C Muramatsu	6^{5}	3
WC	(Germany) A Klasen	1	1
2	(France) O Dodin	6	6

Quarterfinals
Q	(United States) C Scholl	4	4
4	(United States) E Navarro	6	6
Q	(Switzerland) S Scilipoti	5	2
2	(France) O Dodin	7	6

Semifinals
4	(United States) E Navarro	7	4	6
2	(France) O Dodin	5	6	4
