= 2021 Elle Spirit Open =

Tennis tournament

- Date: 6–12 September 2021
- Edition: 4th
- Category: ITF Women's World Tennis Tour
- Prize money: $60,000
- Surface: Clay
- Location: Montreux, Switzerland

Champions

Singles
- (Brazil) Beatriz Haddad Maia

Doubles
- (France) Estelle Cascino / (Italy) Camilla Rosatello
← 2019 ·	Montreux Ladies Open	· 2022 →

The 2021 Elle Spirit Open was a professional women's tennis tournament played on outdoor clay courts. It was the fourth edition of the tournament which was part of the 2021 ITF Women's World Tennis Tour. It took place in Montreux, Switzerland between 6 and 12 September 2021.

== Singles main-draw entrants ==
=== Seeds ===
Country	Player	Rank^{1}	Seed
GBR	Francesca Jones	170	1
RUS	Natalia Vikhlyantseva	173	2
BRA	Beatriz Haddad Maia	174	3
FRA	Chloé Paquet	195	4
TUR	Çağla Büyükakçay	202	5
SUI	Susan Bandecchi	226	6
ITA	Federica Di Sarra	238	7
SUI	Conny Perrin	255	8

- ^{1} Rankings are as of 30 August 2021.

=== Other entrants ===
The following players received wildcards into the singles main draw:

- (Switzerland) Jenny Dürst
- (Switzerland) Alina Granwehr
- (Switzerland) Valentina Ryser
- (Switzerland) Joanne Züger

The following player received entry using as a special exempt:

- (Turkey) İpek Öz

The following players received entry from the qualifying draw:

- (Romania) Karola Bejenaru
- (Italy) Melania Delai
- (Switzerland) Fiona Ganz
- (United Kingdom) Sarah Beth Grey
- (Norway) Malene Helgø
- (Italy) Verena Meliss
- (Italy) Tatiana Pieri
- (United States) Chiara Scholl

== Champions ==
=== Singles ===
- (Brazil) Beatriz Haddad Maia def. (United Kingdom) Francesca Jones, 6–4, 6–3

=== Doubles ===
- (France) Estelle Cascino / (Italy) Camilla Rosatello def. (Switzerland) Conny Perrin / (United Kingdom) Eden Silva, 7–6^{(7–4)}, 6–4
