= 2023 Elle Spirit Open – Doubles =

Doubles
- 2023 Elle Spirit Open

Final
- Champions: Amina Anshba (Netherlands) Lexie Stevens
- Runners-up: (Portugal) Francisca Jorge (Portugal) Matilde Jorge
- Score: 1–6, 7–5, [12–10]

Events
Singles	Doubles
← 2022 ·	Montreux Ladies Open	· 2024 →

Inès Ibbou and Naïma Karamoko is the defending champions, but Ibbou chose not to participate. Karamoko partnered with Deborah Chiesa, but they lost in the semifinals to Amina Anshba and Lexie Stevens.

Anshba and Stevens went on to win the title, defeating Francisca Jorge and Matilde Jorge in the final, 1–6, 7–5, [12–10].

== Seeds ==
1. (Portugal) Francisca Jorge / (Portugal) Matilde Jorge (final)
2. Amina Anshba / (Netherlands) Lexie Stevens (champions)
3. (Switzerland) Jenny Dürst / (Netherlands) Isabelle Haverlag (first round)
4. (France) Estelle Cascino / (Latvia) Diāna Marcinkēviča (first round)

== Draw ==
=== Key ===
- Q = Qualifier
- WC = Wild card
- LL = Lucky loser
- Alt = Alternate
- SE = Special exempt
- PR = Protected ranking
- ITF = ITF entry
- JE = Junior exempt
- w/o = Walkover
- r = Retired
- d = Defaulted
- SR = Special ranking

=== Draw ===
First round
(Switzerland) M Mettraux (Japan) M Mushika	5	2
(Argentina) B Bonardi (Australia) TN Smith	7	6
3	(Switzerland) J Dürst (Netherlands) I Haverlag	6	5	[5]
(Switzerland) C Perrin (Italy) D Spiteri	3	7	[10]
E Maklakova (Serbia) L Radivojević	w/o
(Germany) A Gabric (Switzerland) V Ryser
(Switzerland) K Kozakova (Switzerland) L Küng	4	2
(Czech Republic) M Bayerlová (Romania) AG Vasilescu	6	6
(Italy) D Chiesa (Switzerland) N Karamoko	7^{7}	4	[10]
4	(France) E Cascino (Latvia) D Marcinkēviča	6^{2}	6	[7]
(France) A Ramé (Switzerland) A Rushiti	7	6
(Switzerland) J Kunz (Ukraine) S Pushkar	5	1

Quarterfinals
1	(Portugal) F Jorge (Portugal) M Jorge	6	6
(Argentina) B Bonardi (Australia) TN Smith	1	2
(Switzerland) C Perrin (Italy) D Spiteri	7	6
E Maklakova (Serbia) L Radivojević	5	2
(Czech Republic) M Bayerlová (Romania) AG Vasilescu	2	7	[4]
(Italy) D Chiesa (Switzerland) N Karamoko	6	5	[10]
(France) A Ramé (Switzerland) A Rushiti	4	4
2	A Anshba (Netherlands) L Stevens	6	6

Semifinals
1	(Portugal) F Jorge (Portugal) M Jorge	6	7^{7}
(Switzerland) C Perrin (Italy) D Spiteri	1	6^{0}
(Italy) D Chiesa (Switzerland) N Karamoko	1	6^{2}
2	A Anshba (Netherlands) L Stevens	6	7^{7}

Final
1	(Portugal) F Jorge (Portugal) M Jorge	6	5	[10]
2	A Anshba (Netherlands) L Stevens	1	7	[12]
