= 2021 Elle Spirit Open – Singles =

Singles
- 2021 Elle Spirit Open

Final
- Champion: (Brazil) Beatriz Haddad Maia
- Runner-up: (United Kingdom) Francesca Jones
- Score: 6–4, 6–3

Events
Singles	Doubles
← 2019 ·	Montreux Ladies Open	· 2022 →

Olga Danilović was the defending champion, but chose not to participate.

Beatriz Haddad Maia won the title, defeating Francesca Jones in the final, 6–4, 6–3.

== Seeds ==
1. (United Kingdom) Francesca Jones (final)
2. (Russia) Natalia Vikhlyantseva (quarterfinals)
3. (Brazil) Beatriz Haddad Maia (champion)
4. (France) Chloé Paquet (semifinals)
5. (Turkey) Çağla Büyükakçay (semifinals)
6. (Switzerland) Susan Bandecchi (quarterfinals)
7. (Italy) Federica Di Sarra (quarterfinals)
8. (Switzerland) Conny Perrin (quarterfinals)

== Draw ==
=== Key ===
- Q = Qualifier
- WC = Wild card
- LL = Lucky loser
- Alt = Alternate
- ITF = ITF entry
- PR = Protected ranking
- SR = Special ranking
- SE = Special exempt
- JE = Junior exempt
- JR = Junior Accelerator Programme entrant
- CO = College Accelerator Programme entrant
- NG = Next Gen Accelerator Program entrant
- w/o = Walkover
- r = Retired
- d = Defaulted

=== Finals ===
Semifinals
1	(United Kingdom) Francesca Jones	6	6
3	(France) Chloé Paquet	1	3
3	(Brazil) Beatriz Haddad Maia	6	6
5	(Turkey) Çağla Büyükakçay	2	4

Final
1	(United Kingdom) Francesca Jones	4	3
3	(Brazil) Beatriz Haddad Maia	6	6

=== Top half ===
First round
1	(United Kingdom) F Jones	6	6
(United States) E Halbauer	2	1
(Italy) S Rubini	3	5
(Italy) J Pieri	6	7
WC	(Switzerland) J Dürst	4	5
Q	(Norway) M Helgø	6	7
WC	(Switzerland) J Züger	2	1
7	(Italy) F Di Sarra	6	6
4	(France) C Paquet	6	2	6
Q	(Switzerland) F Ganz	2	6	0
Q	(United Kingdom) SB Grey	6	3	6
(Switzerland) Y In-Albon	3	6	1
WC	(Switzerland) A Granwehr	6	1	4
Q	(United States) C Scholl	0	6	6
(Latvia) D Marcinkēviča	4	1
6	(Switzerland) S Bandecchi	6	6

Second round
1	(United Kingdom) F Jones	6	4	6
(Italy) J Pieri	2	6	1
Q	(Norway) M Helgø	4	3
7	(Italy) F Di Sarra	6	6
4	(France) C Paquet	6	6
Q	(United Kingdom) SB Grey	4	2
Q	(United States) C Scholl	2	1
6	(Switzerland) S Bandecchi	6	6

Quarterfinals
1	(United Kingdom) F Jones	6	4	6
7	(Italy) F Di Sarra	3	6	3
3	(France) C Paquet	6	7^{7}
6	(Switzerland) S Bandecchi	4	6^{4}

Semifinals
1	(United Kingdom) F Jones	6	6
3	(France) C Paquet	1	3

=== Bottom half ===
First round
8	(Switzerland) C Perrin	6	7^{7}
WC	(Switzerland) V Ryser	1	6^{1}
Q	(Italy) M Delai	4	2
SE	(Turkey) İ Öz	6	6
(France) E Jacquemot	3	6	6
Q	(Italy) V Meliss	6	3	4
Q	(Romania) K Bejenaru	2	3
3	(Brazil) B Haddad Maia	6	6
5	(Turkey) Ç Büyükakçay	7	6
(Japan) N Hanatani	5	2
(Italy) B Turati	0	2
(Italy) M Di Giuseppe	6	6
(Switzerland) S Waltert	7^{7}	6
Q	(Italy) T Pieri	6^{4}	2
(Italy) C Rosatello	2	1
2	(Russia) N Vikhlyantseva	6	6

Second round
8	(Switzerland) C Perrin	7^{13}	4	6
SE	(Turkey) İ Öz	6^{11}	6	3
(France) E Jacquemot	1	7	1
3	(Brazil) B Haddad Maia	6	5	6
5	(Turkey) Ç Büyükakçay	6	7
(Italy) M Di Giuseppe	2	5
(Switzerland) S Waltert	6^{4}	1
2	(Russia) N Vikhlyantseva	7^{7}	6

Quarterfinals
8	(Switzerland) C Perrin	0	2
3	(Brazil) B Haddad Maia	6	6
5	(Turkey) Ç Büyükakçay	6	6
2	(Russia) N Vikhlyantseva	4	1

Semifinals
3	(Brazil) B Haddad Maia	6	6
5	(Turkey) Ç Büyükakçay	2	4
