= 2019 Montreux Ladies Open – Singles =

Singles
- 2019 Montreux Ladies Open

Final
- Champion: (Serbia) Olga Danilović
- Runner-up: (Austria) Julia Grabher
- Score: 6–2, 6–3

Events
Singles	Doubles
← 2018 ·	Montreux Ladies Open	· 2021 →

Iga Świątek was the defending champion, but chose not to participate.

Olga Danilović won the title, defeating Julia Grabher in the final, 6–2, 6–3.

== Seeds ==
1. (Germany) Tamara Korpatsch (second round)
2. (Luxembourg) Mandy Minella (second round)
3. (Switzerland) Conny Perrin (quarterfinals)
4. (Latvia) Diāna Marcinkēviča (second round)
5. (Serbia) Olga Danilović (champion)
6. (Switzerland) Ylena In-Albon (first round)
7. (Brazil) Gabriela Cé (semifinals)
8. (France) Tessah Andrianjafitrimo (second round)

== Draw ==
=== Key ===
- Q = Qualifier
- WC = Wild card
- LL = Lucky loser
- Alt = Alternate
- SE = Special exempt
- PR = Protected ranking
- ITF = ITF entry
- JE = Junior exempt
- w/o = Walkover
- r = Retired
- d = Defaulted
- SR = Special ranking

=== Finals ===
Semifinals
(Austria) Julia Grabher	6	6
7	(Brazil) Gabriela Cé	1	2
5	(Serbia) Olga Danilović	6	6
(France) Alice Ramé	0	3

Final
(Austria) Julia Grabher	2	3
5	(Serbia) Olga Danilović	6	6

=== Top half ===
First round
1	(Germany) T Korpatsch	1	7	6
(France) M Yerolymos	6	5	1
WC	(Switzerland) N Stadler	4	2
(Germany) C Werner	6	6
(Liechtenstein) K von Deichmann	7	3	2
(Austria) J Grabher	5	6	6
(Belgium) M Benoît	1	1
8	(France) T Andrianjafitrimo	6	6
3	(Switzerland) C Perrin	6	6
(Belgium) K Zimmermann	3	2
(Germany) S Wagner	4	6	6
WC	(Switzerland) T Sugnaux	6	4	2
(Switzerland) L Küng	6	6
Q	(Switzerland) S Ochsner	2	1
(Turkey) İ Soylu	3	6	0^{r}
7	(Brazil) G Cé	6	2	2

Second round
1	(Germany) T Korpatsch	6^{6}	4
(Germany) C Werner	7^{8}	6
(Austria) J Grabher	6	6
8	(France) T Andrianjafitrimo	2	4
3	(Switzerland) C Perrin	6	6
(Germany) S Wagner	2	4
(Switzerland) L Küng	1	5
7	(Brazil) G Cé	6	7

Quarterfinals
(Germany) C Werner	2	3
(Austria) J Grabher	6	6
3	(Switzerland) C Perrin	5	7^{8}	3
7	(Brazil) G Cé	7	6^{6}	6

Semifinals
(Austria) J Grabher	6	6
7	(Brazil) G Cé	1	2

=== Bottom half ===
First round
5	(Serbia) O Danilović	6	6
Q	(France) S Cakarevic	1	2
WC	(Switzerland) V Ryser	0	3
(Luxembourg) E Molinaro	6	6
Q	(Switzerland) X Knoll	3	7^{8}	2
(Switzerland) S Waltert	6	6^{6}	6
Q	(Italy) V Meliss	2	6	3
4	(Latvia) D Marcinkēviča	6	2	6
6	(Switzerland) Y In-Albon	3	3
(France) A Ramé	6	6
WC	(Switzerland) J Züger	4	6	6
Q	(Kyrgyzstan) K Palkina	6	0	4
LL	(Switzerland) F Ganz	4	2
(Japan) M Osaka	6	6
Q	(France) M Partaud	3	0
2	(Luxembourg) M Minella	6	6

Second round
5	(Serbia) O Danilović	6	6
(Luxembourg) E Molinaro	1	1
(Switzerland) S Waltert	4	7^{7}	6
4	(Latvia) D Marcinkēviča	6	6^{2}	1
(France) A Ramé	6	6
WC	(Switzerland) J Züger	2	0
(Japan) M Osaka	6	3	6
2	(Luxembourg) M Minella	1	6	4

Quarterfinals
5	(Serbia) O Danilović	6	4	6
(Switzerland) S Waltert	2	6	1
(France) A Ramé	6	6
(Japan) M Osaka	0	4

Semifinals
5	(Serbia) O Danilović	6	6
(France) A Ramé	0	3
