= 2022 Elle Spirit Open – Doubles =

Doubles
- 2022 Elle Spirit Open

Final
- Champions: (Algeria) Inès Ibbou (Switzerland) Naïma Karamoko
- Runners-up: (Switzerland) Jenny Dürst (Poland) Weronika Falkowska
- Score: 2–6, 6–3, [16–14]

Events
Singles	Doubles
← 2021 ·	Montreux Ladies Open	· 2023 →

Estelle Cascino and Camilla Rosatello are the defending champions, but Rosatello chose not to participate. Cascino partnered with Conny Perrin, but they lost to Inès Ibbou and Naïma Karamoko in the quarterfinals.

Ibbou and Karamoko went on to win the title, defeating Jenny Dürst and Weronika Falkowska in the final, 2–6, 6–3, [16–14].

== Seeds ==
1. (France) Estelle Cascino / (Switzerland) Conny Perrin (quarterfinals)
2. (Switzerland) Jenny Dürst / (Poland) Weronika Falkowska (final)
3. (Romania) Oana Gavrilă / (Latvia) Diāna Marcinkēviča (first round)
4. (United Kingdom) Emily Appleton / (France) Elsa Jacquemot (semifinals)

== Draw ==
=== Key ===
- Q = Qualifier
- WC = Wild card
- LL = Lucky loser
- Alt = Alternate
- SE = Special exempt
- PR = Protected ranking
- ITF = ITF entry
- JE = Junior exempt
- w/o = Walkover
- r = Retired
- d = Defaulted
- SR = Special ranking

=== Draw ===
First round
(Switzerland) A Granwehr (Switzerland) S Scilipoti	2	4
(Algeria) I Ibbou (Switzerland) N Karamoko	6	6
4	(United Kingdom) E Appleton (France) E Jacquemot	6	3	[11]
(Argentina) B Bonardi (Italy) E Chiesa	2	6	[9]
J Avdeeva; P Bakhmutkina
(Switzerland) MM Fiacan (Ukraine) E Grekul	w/o
(Germany) A Klasen (Switzerland) V Ryser	5	5
P Kudermetova (Netherlands) A Rus	7	7
(Czech Republic) M Bayerlová (United States) C Scholl	6	6
3	(Romania) O Gavrilă (Latvia) D Marcinkēviča	2	4
(Brazil) M Galvão Borges (Romania) A-I Iacob	1	1
(Japan) M Ayukawa (Japan) E Shimizu	6	6
(Switzerland) A Rushiti (Switzerland) T Sugnaux	1	4
2	(Switzerland) J Dürst (Poland) W Falkowska	6	6

Quarterfinals
1	(France) E Cascino (Switzerland) C Perrin	7	2	[6]
(Algeria) I Ibbou (Switzerland) N Karamoko	5	6	[10]
4	(United Kingdom) E Appleton (France) E Jacquemot	6	6
(Switzerland) MM Fiacan (Ukraine) E Grekul	1	3
P Kudermetova (Netherlands) A Rus	6	5	[11]
(Czech Republic) M Bayerlová (United States) C Scholl	3	7	[9]
(Japan) M Ayukawa (Japan) E Shimizu	4	3
2	(Switzerland) J Dürst (Poland) W Falkowska	6	6

Semifinals
(Algeria) I Ibbou (Switzerland) N Karamoko	7	6
4	(United Kingdom) E Appleton (France) E Jacquemot	5	4
P Kudermetova (Netherlands) A Rus	3	1
2	(Switzerland) J Dürst (Poland) W Falkowska	6	6

Final
(Algeria) I Ibbou (Switzerland) N Karamoko	2	6	[16]
2	(Switzerland) J Dürst (Poland) W Falkowska	6	3	[14]
