= 2019 Montreux Ladies Open – Doubles =

Doubles
- 2019 Montreux Ladies Open

Final
- Champions: (Switzerland) Xenia Knoll (Luxembourg) Mandy Minella
- Runners-up: (Switzerland) Ylena In-Albon (Switzerland) Conny Perrin
- Score: 6–3, 6–4

Events
Singles	Doubles
← 2018 ·	Montreux Ladies Open	· 2021 →

Andreea Mitu and Elena-Gabriela Ruse were the defending champions, but chose not to participate.

Xenia Knoll and Mandy Minella won the title, defeating Ylena In-Albon and Conny Perrin in the final, 6–3, 6–4.

== Seeds ==
1. (Switzerland) Xenia Knoll / (Luxembourg) Mandy Minella (champions)
2. (Switzerland) Ylena In-Albon / (Switzerland) Conny Perrin (final)
3. (Belgium) Marie Benoît / (Latvia) Diāna Marcinkēviča (semifinals)
4. (Brazil) Gabriela Cé / (Switzerland) Nina Stadler (quarterfinals, withdrew)

== Draw ==
=== Key ===
- Q = Qualifier
- WC = Wild card
- LL = Lucky loser
- Alt = Alternate
- SE = Special exempt
- PR = Protected ranking
- ITF = ITF entry
- JE = Junior exempt
- w/o = Walkover
- r = Retired
- d = Defaulted
- SR = Special ranking

=== Draw ===
First round
(Germany) T Korpatsch (Switzerland) P Wuarin	w/o
(Turkey) İ Soylu (Switzerland) S Waltert
(Switzerland) J Dürst (Switzerland) F Ganz	6	6
(Switzerland) MM Fiacan (Switzerland) T Pereira	2	1
(Kyrgyzstan) K Palkina (France) M Partaud	4	4
(Liechtenstein) K von Deichmann (Belgium) K Zimmermann	6	6
(Ukraine) M Kostiuk (United Kingdom) O Sonnekus-Williams	0	0
4	(Brazil) G Cé (Switzerland) N Stadler	6	6
(Poland) E Duda (Austria) R Rakic	2	0
(Switzerland) L Küng (Switzerland) T Sugnaux	6	6

Quarterfinals
1	(Switzerland) X Knoll (Luxembourg) M Minella	6	6
(Germany) T Korpatsch (Switzerland) P Wuarin	1	2
3	(Belgium) M Benoît (Latvia) D Marcinkēviča	6	6
(Switzerland) J Dürst (Switzerland) F Ganz	4	3
(Liechtenstein) K von Deichmann (Belgium) K Zimmermann	w/o
4	(Brazil) G Cé (Switzerland) N Stadler
(Switzerland) L Küng (Switzerland) T Sugnaux	5	4
2	(Switzerland) Y In-Albon (Switzerland) C Perrin	7	6

Semifinals
1	(Switzerland) X Knoll (Luxembourg) M Minella	7^{7}	6
3	(Belgium) M Benoît (Latvia) D Marcinkēviča	6^{4}	2
(Liechtenstein) K von Deichmann (Belgium) K Zimmermann	3	4
2	(Switzerland) Y In-Albon (Switzerland) C Perrin	6	6

Final
1	(Switzerland) X Knoll (Luxembourg) M Minella	6	6
2	(Switzerland) Y In-Albon (Switzerland) C Perrin	3	4
