= 2023 Elle Spirit Open =

Tennis tournament

- Date: 4–10 September 2023
- Edition: 6th
- Category: ITF Women's World Tennis Tour
- Prize money: $60,000
- Surface: Clay / Outdoor
- Location: Montreux, Switzerland

Champions

Singles
- (Hungary) Anna Bondár

Doubles
- Amina Anshba / (Netherlands) Lexie Stevens
← 2022 ·	Montreux Ladies Open	· 2024 →

The 2023 Elle Spirit Open was a professional tennis tournament played on outdoor clay courts. It was the sixth edition of the tournament which was part of the 2023 ITF Women's World Tennis Tour. It took place in Montreux, Switzerland between 4 and 10 September 2023.

== Champions ==
=== Singles ===
- (Hungary) Anna Bondár def. (Germany) Anna Gabric, 6–4, 6–1

=== Doubles ===
- Amina Anshba / (Netherlands) Lexie Stevens def. (Portugal) Francisca Jorge / (Portugal) Matilde Jorge 1–6, 7–5, [12–10]

== Singles main draw entrants ==
=== Seeds ===
Country	Player	Rank^{1}	Seed
ITA	Lucrezia Stefanini	102	1
FRA	Océane Dodin	117	2
HUN	Anna Bondár	128	3
SUI	Lulu Sun	196	4
FRA	Chloé Paquet	209	5
TUR	İpek Öz	216	6
CZE	Lucie Havlíčková	220	7
SRB	Lola Radivojević	253	8

- ^{1} Rankings are as of 28 August 2023.

=== Other entrants ===
The following players received wildcards into the singles main draw:

- (Switzerland) Nadine Keller
- (Switzerland) Leonie Küng
- (Switzerland) Conny Perrin
- (Switzerland) Lulu Sun

The following players received entry from the qualifying draw:

- (France) Loïs Boisson
- (Italy) Deborah Chiesa
- (Germany) Anna Gabric
- (Switzerland) Fiona Ganz
- (Portugal) Matilde Jorge
- (Italy) Laura Mair
- (France) Alice Ramé
- (Australia) Tina Nadine Smith
