= 2018 Montreux Ladies Open =

- Date: 3–9 September
- Edition: 2nd
- Category: ITF Women's Circuit
- Prize money: $60,000
- Surface: Clay
- Location: Montreux, Switzerland

Champions

Singles
- (Poland) Iga Świątek

Doubles
- (Romania) Andreea Mitu / (Romania) Elena-Gabriela Ruse
← 2017 ·	Montreux Ladies Open	· 2019 →

The 2018 Montreux Ladies Open was a professional tennis tournament played on outdoor clay courts. It was the second edition of the tournament and was part of the 2018 ITF Women's Circuit. It took place in Montreux, Switzerland, on 3–9 September 2018.

== Singles main draw entrants ==
=== Seeds ===
Country	Player	Rank^{1}	Seed
COL	Mariana Duque Mariño	120	1
SUI	Conny Perrin	148	2
ITA	Martina Trevisan	175	3
GER	Tamara Korpatsch	180	4
NED	Bibiane Schoofs	181	5
ITA	Deborah Chiesa	189	6
UKR	Katarina Zavatska	203	7
TUR	Çağla Büyükakçay	206	8

- ^{1} Rankings as of 27 August 2018.

=== Other entrants ===
The following players received a wildcard into the singles main draw:

- (Switzerland) Timea Bacsinszky
- (Switzerland) Leonie Küng
- (Switzerland) Amra Sadiković
- (Switzerland) Simona Waltert

The following players received entry from the qualifying draw:

- (Italy) Cristiana Ferrando
- (Romania) Andreea Mitu
- (Switzerland) Tess Sugnaux
- (Germany) Stephanie Wagner

== Champions ==
=== Singles ===
- (Poland) Iga Świątek def. (Belgium) Kimberley Zimmermann, 6–2, 6–2

=== Doubles ===
- (Romania) Andreea Mitu / (Romania) Elena-Gabriela Ruse def. (Brazil) Laura Pigossi / (Belgium) Maryna Zanevska, 4–6, 6–3, [10–4]
