= 2018 Montreux Ladies Open – Singles =

Singles
- 2018 Montreux Ladies Open

Final
- Champion: (Poland) Iga Świątek
- Runner-up: (Belgium) Kimberley Zimmermann
- Score: 6–2, 6–2

Events
Singles	Doubles
← 2017 ·	Montreux Ladies Open	· 2019 →

María Teresa Torró Flor was the defending champion, but chose not to participate.

Iga Świątek won the title, defeating Kimberley Zimmermann in the final, 6–2, 6–2.

== Seeds ==
1. (Colombia) Mariana Duque Mariño (semifinals)
2. (Switzerland) Conny Perrin (second round)
3. (Italy) Martina Trevisan (second round)
4. (Germany) Tamara Korpatsch (second round)
5. (Netherlands) Bibiane Schoofs (second round)
6. (Italy) Deborah Chiesa (first round)
7. (Ukraine) Katarina Zavatska (first round)
8. (Turkey) Çağla Büyükakçay (first round)

== Draw ==
=== Key ===
- Q = Qualifier
- WC = Wild card
- LL = Lucky loser
- Alt = Alternate
- SE = Special exempt
- PR = Protected ranking
- ITF = ITF entry
- JE = Junior exempt
- w/o = Walkover
- r = Retired
- d = Defaulted
- SR = Special ranking

=== Finals ===
Semifinals
1	(Colombia) Mariana Duque Mariño	2	3
(Poland) Iga Świątek	6	6
(Belgium) Kimberley Zimmermann	7	6
(Switzerland) Ylena In-Albon	5	2

Final
(Poland) Iga Świątek	6	6
(Belgium) Kimberley Zimmermann	2	2

=== Top half ===
First round
1	(Colombia) M Duque Mariño	6	6
(United States) C Scholl	1	1
Q	(Germany) S Wagner	6	6
(Bulgaria) I Shinikova	4	2
WC	(Switzerland) A Sadiković	7	6
(Italy) G Gatto-Monticone	5	1
(France) C Paquet	6	3	6
7	(Ukraine) K Zavatska	3	6	1
4	(Germany) T Korpatsch	6	6
Q	(Switzerland) T Sugnaux	1	2
WC	(Switzerland) S Waltert	6	2	3
(Romania) E-G Ruse	4	6	6
(Poland) I Świątek	6	6
(France) A Hesse	4	1
(Latvia) D Marcinkēviča	6	6
6	(Italy) D Chiesa	4	2

Second round
1	(Colombia) M Duque Mariño	1	6	6
Q	(Germany) S Wagner	6	1	2
WC	(Switzerland) A Sadiković	0	6	6
(France) C Paquet	6	2	1
4	(Germany) T Korpatsch	6	1	3
(Romania) E-G Ruse	3	6	6
(Poland) I Świątek	6	6
(Latvia) D Marcinkēviča	0	1

Quarterfinals
1	(Colombia) M Duque Mariño	6^{4}	6	7
WC	(Switzerland) A Sadiković	7^{7}	2	5
(Romania) E-G Ruse	6	1	2
(Poland) I Świątek	2	6	6

Semifinals
1	(Colombia) M Duque Mariño	2	3
(Poland) I Świątek	6	6

=== Bottom half ===
First round
8	(Turkey) Ç Büyükakçay	5	6	1
(Belgium) M Zanevska	7	4	6
(Belgium) K Zimmermann	6	6
Q	(Romania) A Mitu	2	2
(Japan) M Osaka	6	6
(Czech Republic) M Kilnarová	2	1
Q	(Italy) C Ferrando	4	6	3
3	(Italy) M Trevisan	6	3	6
5	(Netherlands) B Schoofs	6	6
(Italy) J Paolini	0	4
(Switzerland) Y In-Albon	6	6
WC	(Switzerland) T Bacsinszky	1	2
WC	(Switzerland) L Küng	6	1	6^{7}
(Austria) J Grabher	2	6	7^{9}
(Paraguay) M González	1	4
2	(Switzerland) C Perrin	6	6

Second round
(Belgium) M Zanevska	2	6	1
(Belgium) K Zimmermann	6	3	6
(Japan) M Osaka	6	6
3	(Italy) M Trevisan	3	2
5	(Netherlands) B Schoofs	3	2
(Switzerland) Y In-Albon	6	6
(Austria) J Grabher	6	4	6
2	(Switzerland) C Perrin	2	6	4

Quarterfinals
(Belgium) K Zimmermann	7	6
(Japan) M Osaka	5	4
(Switzerland) Y In-Albon	6	7
(Austria) J Grabher	4	5

Semifinals
(Belgium) K Zimmermann	7	6
(Switzerland) Y In-Albon	5	2
