= 2018 Montreux Ladies Open – Doubles =

Doubles
- 2018 Montreux Ladies Open

Final
- Champions: (Romania) Andreea Mitu (Romania) Elena-Gabriela Ruse
- Runners-up: (Brazil) Laura Pigossi (Belgium) Maryna Zanevska
- Score: 4–6, 6–3, [10–4]

Events
Singles	Doubles
← 2017 ·	Montreux Ladies Open	· 2019 →

Xenia Knoll and Amra Sadiković were the defending champions, but both players chose not to participate.

Andreea Mitu and Elena-Gabriela Ruse won the title, defeating Laura Pigossi and Maryna Zanevska in the final, 4–6, 6–3, [10–4].

== Seeds ==
1. (Brazil) Laura Pigossi / (Belgium) Maryna Zanevska (final)
2. (Netherlands) Bibiane Schoofs / (Belgium) Kimberley Zimmermann (first round)
3. (United Kingdom) Tara Moore / (Switzerland) Conny Perrin (semifinals)
4. (Romania) Andreea Mitu / (Romania) Elena-Gabriela Ruse (champions)

== Draw ==
=== Key ===
- Q = Qualifier
- WC = Wild card
- LL = Lucky loser
- Alt = Alternate
- ITF = ITF entry
- PR = Protected ranking
- SR = Special ranking
- SE = Special exempt
- JE = Junior exempt
- JR = Junior Accelerator Programme entrant
- CO = College Accelerator Programme entrant
- NG = Next Gen Accelerator Program entrant
- w/o = Walkover
- r = Retired
- d = Defaulted

=== Draw ===
First round
1	(Brazil) L Pigossi (Belgium) M Zanevska	7	6
(Colombia) M Duque Mariño (France) A Hesse	5	1
(Italy) G Marchetti (Italy) C Rosatello	6	6
WC	(United Kingdom) S Anane (Czech Republic) M Kilnarová	3	2
3	(United Kingdom) T Moore (Switzerland) C Perrin	w/o
(Romania) A Ghițescu (United States) J Ho
(Spain) Y Cavallé Reimers (Belgium) H Scholsen	3	7^{7}	[10]
(Finland) M Eklund (Switzerland) T Sugnaux	6	6^{5}	[4]
WC	(Russia) V Gracheva (Ukraine) K Zavatska	3	4
(United States) E Halbauer (United States) C Scholl	6	6
WC	(Austria) J Trickovic (Austria) K Trickovic	1	0
4	(Romania) A Mitu (Romania) E-G Ruse	6	6
(Switzerland) Y In-Albon (Switzerland) L Küng	6	3	[10]
(Uzbekistan) A Amanmuradova (Bulgaria) I Shinikova	4	6	[8]
(Germany) T Korpatsch (Latvia) D Marcinkēviča	6	6
2	(Netherlands) B Schoofs (Belgium) K Zimmermann	0	1

Quarterfinals
1	(Brazil) L Pigossi (Belgium) M Zanevska	6	6
(Italy) G Marchetti (Italy) C Rosatello	3	0
3	(United Kingdom) T Moore (Switzerland) C Perrin	6	5	[10]
(Spain) Y Cavallé Reimers (Belgium) H Scholsen	3	7	[3]
(United States) E Halbauer (United States) C Scholl	5	0
4	(Romania) A Mitu (Romania) E-G Ruse	7	6
(Switzerland) Y In-Albon (Switzerland) L Küng	6	7^{7}
(Germany) T Korpatsch (Latvia) D Marcinkēviča	1	6^{4}

Semifinals
1	(Brazil) L Pigossi (Belgium) M Zanevska	6	6
3	(United Kingdom) T Moore (Switzerland) C Perrin	0	3
4	(Romania) A Mitu (Romania) E-G Ruse	6	6
(Switzerland) Y In-Albon (Switzerland) L Küng	1	2

Final
1	(Brazil) L Pigossi (Belgium) M Zanevska	6	3	[4]
4	(Romania) A Mitu (Romania) E-G Ruse	4	6	[10]
