= 2023 Elle Spirit Open – Singles =

Singles
- 2023 Elle Spirit Open

Final
- Champion: (Hungary) Anna Bondár
- Runner-up: (Germany) Anna Gabric
- Score: 6–4, 6–1

Events
| Singles | Doubles |
| ← 2022 · | Montreux Ladies Open | · 2024 → |

Tamara Korpatsch was the defending champion but chose to compete at the 2023 US Open instead.

Anna Bondár won the title, defeating Anna Gabric in the final, 6–4, 6–1.

== Seeds ==
1. (Italy) Lucrezia Stefanini (quarterfinals)
2. (France) Océane Dodin (semifinals)
3. (Hungary) Anna Bondár (champion)
4. (Switzerland) Lulu Sun (first round)
5. (France) Chloé Paquet (second round)
6. (Turkey) İpek Öz (first round)
7. (Czech Republic) Lucie Havlíčková (semifinals)
8. (Serbia) Lola Radivojević (second round)

== Draw ==
=== Key ===
- Q = Qualifier
- WC = Wild card
- LL = Lucky loser
- Alt = Alternate
- SE = Special exempt
- PR = Protected ranking
- ITF = ITF entry
- JE = Junior exempt
- w/o = Walkover
- r = Retired
- d = Defaulted
- SR = Special ranking

=== Finals ===
Semifinals
7 | (Czech Republic) Lucie Havlíčková | 2 | 4
3 | (Hungary) Anna Bondár | 6 | 6
Q | (Germany) Anna Gabric | 6 | 6
2 | (France) Océane Dodin | 2 | 0

Final
3 | (Hungary) Anna Bondár | 6 | 6
Q | (Germany) Anna Gabric | 4 | 1

=== Top half ===
First round
1 | (Italy) L Stefanini | 6 | 6
(Liechtenstein) K von Deichmann | 4 | 1
(Italy) D Spiteri | 6 | 3 | 4
(Portugal) F Jorge | 3 | 6 | 6
WC | (Switzerland) L Küng | 0 | 1
E Maklakova | 6 | 6
(Croatia) A Ružić | 3 | 3
7 | (Czech Republic) L Havlíčková | 6 | 6
3 | (Hungary) A Bondár | 6 | 6
Q | (France) A Ramé | 2 | 1
Q | (Italy) D Chiesa | 6 | 1 | 3
Q | (Portugal) M Jorge | 4 | 6 | 6
Q | (Italy) L Mair | 2 | 6^{10}
WC | (Switzerland) C Perrin | 6 | 7^{12}
(Germany) E Seidel | 6 | 6^{3} | 4
5 | (France) C Paquet | 1 | 7^{7} | 6

Second round
1 | (Italy) L Stefanini | 7 | 6
(Portugal) F Jorge | 5 | 2
E Maklakova | 1 | 6 | 5
7 | (Czech Republic) L Havlíčková | 6 | 4 | 7
3 | (Hungary) A Bondár | 6 | 6
Q | (Portugal) M Jorge | 1 | 2
WC | (Switzerland) C Perrin | 1 | 6 | 6
5 | (France) C Paquet | 6 | 3 | 3

Quarterfinals
1 | (Italy) L Stefanini | 6 | 3 | 5
7 | (Czech Republic) L Havlíčková | 4 | 6 | 7
3 | (Hungary) A Bondár | 4 | 6 | 7^{7}
WC | (Switzerland) C Perrin | 6 | 2 | 6^{5}

Semifinals
7 | (Czech Republic) L Havlíčková | 2 | 4
3 | (Hungary) A Bondár | 6 | 6

=== Bottom half ===
First round
8 | (Serbia) L Radivojević | 7^{7} | 0 | 6
WC | (Switzerland) N Keller | 6^{4} | 6 | 2
A Anshba | 6 | 6^{4} | 3
Q | (Germany) A Gabric | 1 | 7^{7} | 6
Q | (France) L Boisson | 6 | 6
(Brazil) G Cé | 4 | 1
(Burundi) S Nahimana | 2 | 7 | 6
4/WC | (Switzerland) L Sun | 6 | 5 | 4
6 | (Turkey) İ Öz | 2 | 6 | 3
(Switzerland) V Ryser | 6 | 4 | 6
Q | (Australia) TN Smith | 1 | 6 | 5
Q | (Switzerland) F Ganz | 6 | 3 | 7
M Bondarenko | 2 | 7^{7} | 2
(Slovenia) Ž Falkner | 6 | 6^{3} | 6
(Germany) J Middendorf | 3 | 5
2 | (France) O Dodin | 6 | 7

Second round
8 | (Serbia) L Radivojević | 1 | 2
Q | (Germany) A Gabric | 6 | 6
Q | (France) L Boisson | 5 | 6 | 4
(Burundi) S Nahimana | 7 | 4 | 6
(Switzerland) V Ryser | 7 | 3 | 0
Q | (Switzerland) F Ganz | 5 | 6 | 6
(Slovenia) Ž Falkner | 5 | 4
2 | (France) O Dodin | 7 | 6

Quarterfinals
Q | (Germany) A Gabric | 6 | 6
(Burundi) S Nahimana | 2 | 2
Q | (Switzerland) F Ganz | 6^{7} | 3
2 | (France) O Dodin | 7^{9} | 6

Semifinals
Q | (Germany) A Gabric | 6 | 6
2 | (France) O Dodin | 2 | 0
