= Lexie Stevens =

Dutch tennis player

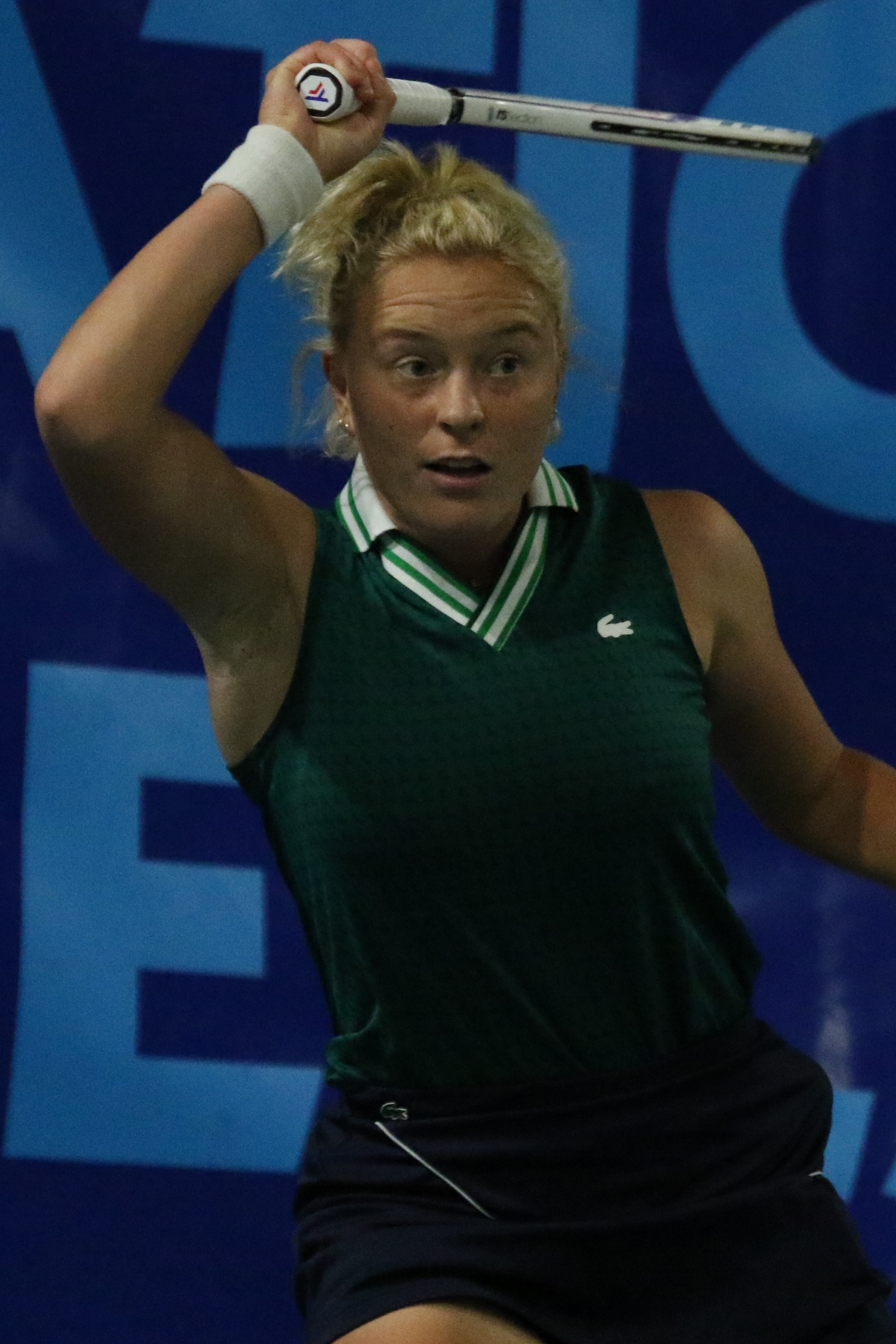
- Stevens 2021 in Poitiers
- Country (sports): Netherlands
- Born: 8 June 1999 (age 27)
- Plays: Right (two-handed backhand)
- Prize money: $62,213

Singles
- Career record: 142–113
- Career titles: 1 ITF
- Highest ranking: No. 409 (8 May 2023)

Doubles
- Career record: 122–61
- Career titles: 13 ITF
- Highest ranking: No. 191 (11 September 2023)

Lexie Stevens (born 8 June 1999) is a Dutch former tennis player.

Stevens has a career-high singles ranking by the WTA of 409, achieved on 8 May 2023. She also has a career-high WTA doubles ranking of 191, attained on 11 September 2023.

She won one singles title and thirteen doubles titles on the ITF Women's World Tennis Tour.

== Early life and background ==
Stevens started playing tennis at the age of six. She has been training with Amanda Hopmans and Mike van den Berg for 15 years.

== National representation ==
She earned her first Billie Jean King Cup nomination in April 2023 against Latvia. She played her first and up to date sole match for the Netherlands in April 2023 in Europe/Africa Zone Group I, while her win-loss record stands at 1–0.

== ITF Circuit finals ==
=== Singles: 3 (1 title, 2 runner-ups) ===
Legend W25 tournaments W15 tournaments (1–2)	Finals by surface Hard (0–1) Clay (1–1)

Result	W–L	Date	Tournament	Tier	Surface	Opponent	Score
Loss	0–1	May 2019	ITF Tacarigua, Trinidad and Tobago	W15	Hard (i)	(United Kingdom) Alice Gillan	3–6, 2–6
Loss	0–2	May 2022	ITF Oran, Algeria	W15	Clay	(Algeria) Inès Ibbou	4–6, 2–6
Win	1–2	May 2022	ITF Oran, Algeria	W15	Clay	(Algeria) Inès Ibbou	7–6^{(4)}, ret.

=== Doubles: 19 (13 titles, 6 runner-ups) ===
Legend W60 tournaments (1–0) W25 tournaments (3–1) W15 tournaments (9–5)	Finals by surface Hard (1–1) Clay (12–5)

Result	W–L	Date	Tournament	Tier	Surface	Partner	Opponents	Score
Win	1–0	Nov 2017	ITF Hammamet, Tunisia	W15	Clay	(Sweden) Mirjam Björklund	(Italy) Beatrice Lombardo (Italy) Gaia Squarcialupi	6–3, 6–0
Loss	1–1	Nov 2019	ITF Heraklion, Greece	W15	Clay	(Serbia) Draginja Vuković	(Spain) Noelia Bouzó Zanotti (Bolivia) Noelia Zeballos	4–6, 7–5, [6–10]
Win	2–1	Nov 2020	ITF Haabneeme, Estonia	W15	Hard (i)	(Lithuania) Justina Mikulskytė	(United Kingdom) Emily Appleton (Poland) Martyna Kubka	6–2, 6–1
Win	3–1	Nov 2020	ITF Cairo, Egypt	W15	Clay	(Czech Republic) Anna Sisková	(Russia) Elina Avanesyan (Belarus) Anna Kubareva	3–6, 6–4, [10–8]
Win	4–1	Jan 2021	ITF Cairo, Egypt	W15	Clay	(United States) Anastasia Nefedova	(Sweden) Fanny Östlund (Egypt) Sandra Samir	6–1, 6–4
Win	5–1	Jan 2021	ITF Cairo, Egypt	W15	Clay	(Russia) Elina Avanesyan	(Italy) Gloria Ceschi (Italy) Marion Viertler	6–1, 6–2
Win	6–1	Jan 2021	ITF Cairo, Egypt	W15	Clay	(Russia) Elina Avanesyan	(United States) Emma Davis (United States) Anastasia Nefedova	6–1, 6–2
Loss	6–2	Feb 2021	ITF Antalya, Turkey	W15	Clay	(Spain) Jéssica Bouzas Maneiro	(Croatia) Mariana Dražić (Romania) Oana Georgeta Simion	6–4, 3–6, [10–12]
Win	7–2	May 2021	ITF Heraklion, Greece	W15	Clay	(Moldova) Anastasia Dețiuc	(Russia) Darya Astakhova (Romania) Elena-Teodora Cadar	6–1, 4–6, [10–6]
Loss	7–3	Nov 2021	ITF Monastir, Tunisia	W15	Hard	(Netherlands) Anouk Koevermans	(Bulgaria) Gergana Topalova (Belgium) Eliessa Vanlangendonck	1–6, 2–6
Win	8–3	May 2022	ITF Oran, Algeria	W15	Clay	(Germany) Luisa Meyer auf der Heide	(Denmark) Elena Jamshidi (Denmark) Divine Dasam Nweke	6–0, 6–1
Loss	8–4	May 2022	ITF Oran, Algeria	W15	Clay	(Germany) Luisa Meyer auf der Heide	(Algeria) Amira Benaïssa (Algeria) Inès Ibbou	walkover
Loss	8–5	Jun 2022	ITF Alkmaar, Netherlands	W15	Clay	(United States) Chiara Scholl	(Poland) Valeriia Olianovskaia (Poland) Stefania Rogozińska Dzik	3–6, 7–5, [6–10]
Win	9–5	Oct 2022	ITF Tucumán, Argentina	W25	Clay	(Ukraine) Valeriya Strakhova	(Mexico) Marian Gómez Pezuela (Argentina) Luciana Moyano	6–3, 6–2
Win	10–5	Oct 2022	ITF Bucaramanga, Colombia	W15	Clay	(Ukraine) Valeriya Strakhova	(Peru) Romina Ccuno (Colombia) María Paulina Pérez	7–6^{(4)}, 6–3
Win	11–5	Feb 2023	ITF Tucumán, Argentina	W25	Clay	(Colombia) María Herazo González	(Australia) Seone Mendez (Latvia) Daniela Vismane	2–6, 6–3, [10–8]
Loss	11–6	May 2023	ITF Santa Margherita di Pula, Italy	W25	Clay	(Bosnia and Herzegovina) Anita Wagner	(Romania) Oana Gavrilă (Greece) Sapfo Sakellaridi	1–6, 1–6
Win	12–6	Aug 2023	ITF Malmö, Sweden	W25	Clay	(Netherlands) Suzan Lamens	(Sweden) Jacqueline Cabaj Awad (Sweden) Lisa Zaar	6–4, 6–1
Win	13–6	Sep 2023	Montreux Ladies Open, Switzerland	W60	Clay	(Russia) Amina Anshba	(Portugal) Francisca Jorge (Portugal) Matilde Jorge	1–6, 7–5, [12–10]

== Billie Jean King Cup participation ==
=== Singles (1–0) ===
Edition	Stage	Date	Location	Against	Surface	Opponent	W/L	Score
2023	Z1 R/R	10 Apr 2023	Antalya, Turkey	Latvia	Clay	Diāna Marcinkēviča	W	6–3, 7–5
