= Naïma Karamoko =

Swiss tennis player (born 1997)

- Country (sports): Switzerland
- Born: 30 September 1997 (age 29)
- Plays: Right-handed
- Prize money: $91,630

Singles
- Career record: 135–159
- Highest ranking: No. 730 (19 August 2024)

Doubles
- Career record: 180–128
- Career titles: 1
- Highest ranking: No. 81 (9 November 2026)
- Current ranking: No. 81 (9 November 2026)
- Last updated on: 9 November 2026.

Naïma Karamoko (born 30 September 1997) is a Swiss tennis player. She has a career-high doubles ranking by the WTA of 81, achieved on 9 November 2026. Karamoko has won one WTA Tour doubles title at the 2026 Chennai Open.

== Career ==
Karamoko won her first $60k title at the 2022 Montreux Ladies Open in the doubles draw, partnering Inès Ibbou. In October 2025, she won her first title on the WTA 125 circuit at the Samsun Open in Turkiye, partnering with Tiantsoa Rakotomanga Rajaonah to defeat Harriet Dart and Maia Lumsden in the final.

Teaming with fellow Swiss player Simona Waltert, Karamoko won her first WTA Tour doubles title at the 2026 Chennai Open, defeating Vaishnavi Adkar and Rutuja Bhosale in the final.

== Career statistics ==
=== WTA Tour finals ===
==== Doubles: 1 (title) ====
Legend WTA 1000 (–) WTA 500 (–) WTA 250 (1–0)	Finals by surface Hard (1–0) Clay (–) Grass (–)

Result	W–L	Date	Tournament	Tier	Surface	Partner	Opponents	Score
Win	1–0	Nov 2026	Chennai Open, India	WTA 250	Hard	(Switzerland) Simona Waltert	(India) Vaishnavi Adkar (India) Rutuja Bhosale	6–2, 6–0

=== WTA 125 finals ===
==== Doubles: 6 (2 titles, 4 runner-ups) ====
Result	W–L	Date	Tournament	Surface	Partner	Opponents	Score
Win	1–0	Oct 2025	Samsun Open, Turkiye	Hard	(France) Tiantsoa Rakotomanga Rajaonah	(United Kingdom) Harriet Dart (United Kingdom) Maia Lumsden	7–5, 1–6, [10–6]
Loss	1–1	Apr 2026	Oeiras Ladies Open, Portugal	Clay	(Latvia) Darja Semeņistaja	(Slovenia) Veronika Erjavec (France) Kristina Mladenovic	2–6, 5–7
Loss	1–2	Jun 2026	Memorial Eugenio Fontana, Italy	Clay	(Georgia (country)) Ekaterine Gorgodze	(Spain) Yvonne Cavallé Reimers (Belgium) Lara Salden	3–6, 4–6
Loss	1–3	Jun 2026	Internazionali di Brescia, Italy	Clay	(Romania) Irina Bara	(Slovenia) Dalila Jakupović (Slovenia) Nika Radišić	4–6, 5–7
Win	2–3	Sep 2026	Internacional de Valencia, Spain	Clay	(Slovenia) Dalila Jakupović	(Spain) Irene Burillo (Argentina) Nicole Fossa Huergo	6–2, 6–3
Loss	2–4	Sep 2026	Ankara Open, Turkey	Hard	(Slovenia) Dalila Jakupović	(Poland) Weronika Falkowska (United States) Alana Smith	2–6, 6–7^{(2)}

=== ITF Circuit finals ===
==== Doubles: 27 (19 titles, 8 runner-ups) ====
Legend W100 tournaments W60/75 tournaments W40/50 tournaments W25/35 tournaments W10/15 tournaments	Finals by surface Hard (9–4) Clay (10–4)

Result	W–L	Date	Tournament	Tier	Surface	Partner	Opponents	Score
Loss	0–1	Aug 2016	ITF Caslano, Switzerland	W10	Clay	(Switzerland) Sara Ottomano	(Italy) Giada Clerici (Italy) Giorgia Marchetti	5–7, 1–6
Win	1–1	Sep 2017	ITF Sion, Switzerland	W10	Clay	(Switzerland) Nina Stadler	(France) Amandine Cazeaux (Spain) Claudia Hoste Ferrer	3–6, 6–3, [10–8]
Win	2–1	Nov 2017	ITF Helsinki, Finland	W15	Hard (i)	(Switzerland) Tess Sugnaux	(Russia) Anastasia Kulikova (Estonia) Elena Malygina	7–5, 6–2
Win	3–1	Sep 2021	ITF Dijon, France	W15	Clay	(Switzerland) Xenia Knoll	(Hungary) Amarissa Tóth (France) Lucie Wargnier	6–2, 6–2
Win	4–1	Nov 2021	ITF Lousada, Portugal	W15	Hard (i)	(Netherlands) Jasmijn Gimbrère	(Portugal) Inês Murta (India) Vasanti Shinde	w/o
Win	5–1	Mar 2022	ITF Marrakech, Morocco	W15	Clay	(Portugal) Inês Murta	(Croatia) Lucija Ćirić Bagarić (United States) Clervie Ngounoue	6–2, 6–7^{(2)}, [10–5]
Win	6–1	Mar 2022	ITF Marrakech, Morocco	W15	Clay	(Portugal) Inês Murta	(Italy) Melania Delai (Slovenia) Pia Lovrič	6–2, 6–4
Win	7–1	Jul 2022	ITF Les Contamines-Montjoie, France	W15	Hard	(Switzerland) Valentina Ryser	(France) Marine Szostak (France) Lucie Wargnier	6–7^{(5)}, 6–2, [10–8]
Win	8–1	Sep 2022	Montreux Ladies Open, Switzerland	W60	Clay	(Algeria) Inès Ibbou	(Switzerland) Jenny Dürst (Poland) Weronika Falkowska	2–6, 6–3, [16–14]
Win	9–1	Nov 2022	ITF Monastir, Tunisia	W15	Hard	(Serbia) Bojana Marinković	(France) Émeline Dartron (France) Emmanuelle Girard	6–4, 6–4
Loss	9–2	Feb 2023	ITF Manacor, Spain	W15	Hard	(Portugal) Inês Murta	(Spain) Olga Parres Azcoitia (Romania) Ioana Loredana Roșca	4–6, 6–7^{(6)}
Win	10–2	Mar 2023	ITF Monastir, Tunisia	W15	Hard	(Bulgaria) Isabella Shinikova	(Chile) Fernanda Labraña (Serbia) Elena Milovanović	6–4, 3–6, [10–5]
Win	11–2	Apr 2023	ITF Monastir, Tunisia	W15	Hard	(France) Nina Radovanovic	(Spain) Yvonne Cavallé Reimers (India) Teja Tirunelveli	7–5, 6–4
Loss	11–3	May 2023	ITF Montemor-o-Novo, Portugal	W40	Hard	(Switzerland) Conny Perrin	(Hong Kong) Eudice Chong (Netherlands) Arianne Hartono	2–6, 0–6
Loss	11–4	Aug 2023	Verbier Open, Switzerland	W25	Clay	(Algeria) Inès Ibbou	(Italy) Deborah Chiesa (Italy) Dalila Spiteri	6–1, 3–6, [7–10]
Win	12–4	Feb 2024	ITF Monastir, Tunisia	W15	Hard	(Switzerland) Tess Sugnaux	(Switzerland) Alina Granwehr (Switzerland) Karolina Kozakova	5–7, 6–2, [10–7]
Loss	12–5	Apr 2024	ITF Bujumbura, Burundi	W35	Clay	(Latvia) Diāna Marcinkēviča	(Latvia) Kamilla Bartone (Burundi) Sada Nahimana	6–4, 3–6, [7–10]
Win	13–5	May 2024	ITF Bucharest, Romania	W15	Clay	(Netherlands) Stéphanie Visscher	(Romania) Iulia Ionescu (Romania) Ștefana Lazăr	6–4, 6–1
Loss	13–6	Jun 2024	ITF Monastir, Tunisia	W15	Hard	(India) Zeel Desai	(China) Xiao Zhenghua (China) Xu Jiayu	6–7^{(7)}, 5–7
Loss	13–7	Aug 2024	Verbier Open, Switzerland	W35	Clay	(Algeria) Inès Ibbou	(United States) Haley Giavara (Latvia) Diāna Marcinkēviča	6–2, 3–6, [7–10]
Win	14–7	Aug 2024	ITF Collonge-Bellerive, Switzerland	W35	Clay	(Algeria) Inès Ibbou	(Switzerland) Karolina Kozakova (Switzerland) Valentina Ryser	7–6^{(0)}, 6–0
Loss	14–8	Oct 2024	Women's TEC Cup, Spain	W100	Hard	(Algeria) Inès Ibbou	(Spain) Yvonne Cavallé Reimers (Netherlands) Eva Vedder	5–7, 6–7^{(5)}
Win	15–8	Oct 2024	ITF Cherbourg-en-Cotentin, France	W50	Hard (i)	(Algeria) Inès Ibbou	(France) Tiphanie Lemaître; Ekaterina Ovcharenko	4–6, 7–6^{(3)}, [10–7]
Win	16–8	Sep 2025	ITF Saint-Palais-sur-Mer, France	W50	Clay	(Lithuania) Justina Mikulskytė	Polina Kaibekova (Netherlands) Demi Tran	6–1, 6–2
Win	17–8	Sep 2025	Lisboa Belém Open, Portugal	W100	Clay	(Portugal) Matilde Jorge	(Slovenia) Dalila Jakupović (Slovenia) Nika Radišić	6–2, 6–3
Win	18–8	Feb 2026	Porto Indoor, Portugal	W75	Hard (i)	(Italy) Deborah Chiesa	(Italy) Angelica Moratelli (Italy) Camilla Rosatello	6–2, 6–2
Win	19–8	May 2026	Zagreb Open, Croatia	W75	Clay	(Croatia) Tara Würth	(Romania) Briana Szabó (Latvia) Beatrise Zeltiņa	3–6, 7–6^{(4)}, [10–5]
