= Inès Ibbou =

Algerian tennis player (born 1999)

Inès Ibbou إيناس إيبو
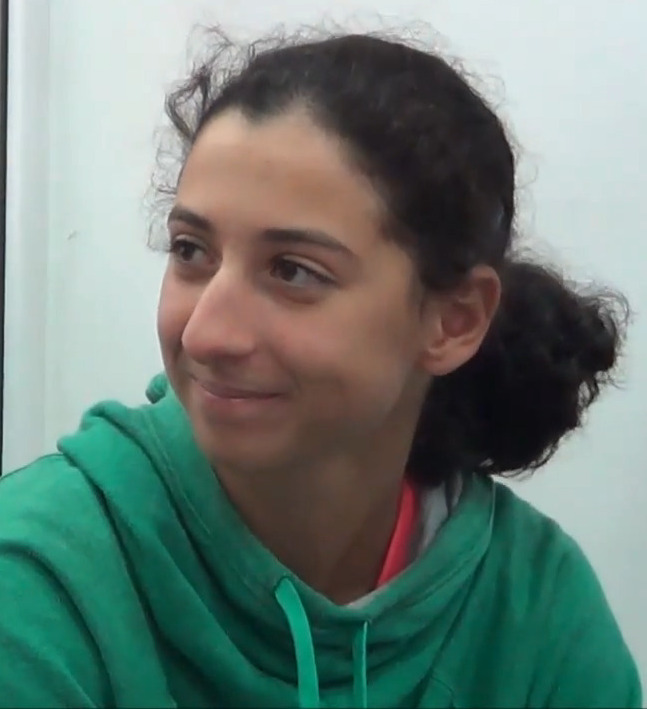
- Full name: Inès Feriel Ibbou إيناس فريال إيبو
- Country (sports): Algeria
- Residence: Staouéli, Algiers
- Born: 5 January 1999 (age 27) El Biar, Algiers
- Plays: Right (two-handed backhand)
- Prize money: $87,903

Singles
- Career record: 190–140
- Career titles: 3 ITF
- Highest ranking: No. 464 (19 December 2022)

Doubles
- Career record: 129–108
- Career titles: 9 ITF
- Highest ranking: No. 166 (19 May 2025)
- Current ranking: No. 1,224 (28 September 2026)

Team competitions
- Fed Cup: 5–5
- Last updated on: 30 September 2026.

Inès Feriel Ibbou (Arabic: إيناس فريال إيبو; born 5 January 1999) is an Algerian inactive tennis player. She is the youngest female tennis player to win a senior ITF tournament in tennis history (14 years and eight months).

She has career-high WTA rankings of 464 in singles, reached on 19 December 2022, and 202 in doubles, achieved on 11 November 2024. Ibbou has won three singles and nine doubles titles on the ITF Women's Circuit.

Playing for Algeria Fed Cup team, Ibbou has an overall win–loss record of 5–5.

== Career ==
=== Junior Grand Slam performance ===
Singles:

- Australian Open: –
- French Open: 2R (2015, 2016)
- Wimbledon: 1R (2015)
- US Open: 1R (2015)

Doubles:

- Australian Open: –
- French Open: QF (2016)
- Wimbledon: 1R (2015)
- US Open: 1R (2015)

== ITF Circuit finals ==
=== Singles: 9 (3 titles, 6 runner-ups) ===
Legend W25/35 tournaments W10/15 tournaments	Finals by surface Hard (0–1) Clay (3–5)

Result	W–L	Date	Tournament	Tier	Surface	Opponent	Score
Win	1–0	Sep 2013	ITF Tlemcen, Algeria	W10	Clay	(France) Amandine Cazeaux	6–1, 6–1
Loss	1–1	May 2016	ITF Hammamet, Tunisia	W10	Clay	(Poland) Sandra Zaniewska	1–6, 4–6
Win	2–1	Sep 2017	ITF Hammamet, Tunisia	W15	Clay	(Russia) Varvara Gracheva	3–6, 7–6^{(4)}, 6–0
Loss	2–2	Nov 2017	ITF Benicarlo, Spain	W15	Clay	(Slovakia) Vivien Juhaszová	1–6, 2–6
Loss	2–3	May 2019	ITF Antalya, Turkey	W15	Clay	(Luxembourg) Eléonora Molinaro	2–6, 4–6
Loss	2–4	Feb 2021	ITF Monastir, Tunisia	W15	Hard	(Czech Republic) Linda Fruhvirtová	2–6, 2–6
Win	3–4	May 2022	ITF Oran, Algeria	W15	Clay	(Netherlands) Lexie Stevens	6–4, 6–2
Loss	3–5	May 2022	ITF Oran, Algeria	W15	Clay	(Netherlands) Lexie Stevens	6–7^{(4)}, ret.
Loss	3–6	Jul 2024	ITF Viserba, Italy	W15	Clay	(Italy) Samira De Stefano	5–7, 3–6

=== Doubles: 20 (9 titles, 11 runner-ups) ===
Legend W100 tournaments W60/75 tournaments W50 tournaments W25/35 tournaments W10/15 tournaments	Finals by surface Hard (3–2) Clay (6–9)

Result	W–L	Date	Tournament	Tier	Surface	Partner	Opponents	Score
Win	1–0	Nov 2013	ITF Nules, Spain	W10	Clay	(Spain) Noelia Bouzó Zanotti	(Spain) María Cañero Pérez (Spain) María José Luque Moreno	7–5, 6–4
Loss	1–1	Apr 2016	ITF Hammamet, Tunisia	W10	Clay	(France) Kélia Le Bihan	(France) Alice Bacquié (Romania) Irina Bara	1–6, 0–6
Loss	1–2	Apr 2016	ITF Hammamet, Tunisia	W10	Clay	(Canada) Petra Januskova	(France) Manon Arcangioli (Italy) Angelica Moratelli	3–6, 4–6
Loss	1–3	Apr 2016	ITF Hammamet, Tunisia	W10	Clay	(Canada) Petra Januskova	(United States) Madeleine Kobelt (Germany) Nora Niedmers	6–1, 3–6, [7–10]
Win	2–3	Sep 2017	ITF Hammamet, Tunisia	W15	Clay	(Italy) Isabella Tcherkes Zade	(Argentina) Victoria Bosio (Colombia) María Fernanda Herazo	6–1, 6–4
Win	3–3	Jan 2021	ITF Monastir, Tunisia	W15	Hard	(Czech Republic) Anna Sisková	(Switzerland) Fiona Ganz (Serbia) Elena Gemović	6–3, 6–1
Win	4–3	Jan 2021	ITF Monastir, Tunisia	W15	Hard	(Russia) Darya Astakhova	(France) Manon Arcangioli (France) Salma Djoubri	6–3, 6–0
Loss	4–4	Feb 2022	ITF Monastir, Tunisia	W15	Hard	(Belarus) Kristina Dmitruk	(Japan) Miyu Kato (Japan) Kisa Yoshioka	4–6, 5–7
Win	5–4	May 2022	ITF Oran, Algeria	W15	Clay	(Algeria) Amira Benaïssa	(Germany) Luisa Meyer auf der Heide (Netherlands) Lexie Stevens	w/o
Win	6–4	Sep 2022	Montreux Ladies Open, Switzerland	W60	Clay	(Switzerland) Naïma Karamoko	(Switzerland) Jenny Dürst (Poland) Weronika Falkowska	2–6, 6–3, [16–14]
Loss	6–5	Aug 2023	Verbier Open, Switzerland	W25	Clay	(Switzerland) Naïma Karamoko	(Italy) Deborah Chiesa (Italy) Dalila Spiteri	6–1, 3–6, [7–10]
Win	7–5	May 2024	ITF Kuršumlijska Banja, Serbia	W15	Clay	(Romania) Karola Patricia Bejenaru	(Serbia) Elena Milovanović (Romania) Andreea Prisăcariu	7–6^{(8)}, 6–7^{(6)}, [10–5]
Loss	7–6	Jun 2024	ITF Kuršumlijska Banja	W35	Clay	(Serbia) Elena Milovanović	(Japan) Mana Kawamura (Japan) Yuki Naito	4–6, 4–6
Loss	7–7	Jul 2024	ITF Viserba, Italy	W15	Clay	(Italy) Francesca Pace	(Italy) Anastasia Bertacchi (Austria) Lilli Tagger	0–6, 6–2, [5–10]
Loss	7–8	Aug 2024	Verbier Open, Switzerland	W35	Clay	(Switzerland) Naïma Karamoko	(United States) Haley Giavara (Latvia) Diāna Marcinkēviča	6–2, 3–6, [7–10]
Win	8–8	Aug 2024	ITF Collonge-Bellerive, Switzerland	W35	Clay	(Switzerland) Naïma Karamoko	(Switzerland) Karolina Kozakova (Switzerland) Valentina Ryser	7–6^{(0)}, 6–0
Loss	8–9	Oct 2024	Women's TEC Cup, Spain	W100	Hard	(Switzerland) Naïma Karamoko	(Spain) Yvonne Cavallé Reimers (Netherlands) Eva Vedder	5–7, 6–7^{(5)}
Win	9–9	Oct 2024	ITF Cherbourg-en-Cotentin, France	W50	Hard (i)	(Switzerland) Naïma Karamoko	(France) Tiphanie Lemaître (Russia) Ekaterina Ovcharenko	4–6, 7–6^{(3)}, [10–7]
Loss	9–10	Apr 2025	Chiasso Open, Switzerland	W75	Clay	(Netherlands) Bibiane Schoofs	(United Kingdom) Alicia Barnett (France) Elixane Lechemia	2–6, 3–6
Loss	9–11	Sep 2025	ITF Bucharest, Romania	W75	Clay	(Greece) Despina Papamichail	(Switzerland) Jenny Dürst (Slovakia) Nina Vargová	1–6, 1–6

== ITF Junior Circuit finals ==
Legend
Category G1
Category G2
Category G3
Category G4
Category G5

=== Singles (4–0) ===
Result	W–L	Date	Tournament	Grade	Surface	Opponent	Score
Win	1–0	Feb 2013	ITF Tlemcen, Algeria	G5	Clay	(Tunisia) Farah Baklouti	6–0, 6–1
Win	2–0	Apr 2015	ITF Cairo, Egypt	G2	Clay	(Egypt) Sandra Samir	6–4, 6–3
Win	3–0	May 2015	ITF Tlemcen, Algeria	G3	Clay	(South Africa) Zani Barnard	6–1, 6–0
Win	4–0	May 2015	ITF Prato, Italy	G2	Clay	(Russia) Anastasia Potapova	6–3, 4–6, 6–3

=== Doubles (3–3) ===
Result	W–L	Date	Tournament	Grade	Surface	Partner	Opponents	Score
Win	1–0	Feb 2013	ITF Tunis, Tunisia	G5	Hard	(Morocco) Ghita Nassik	(Czech Republic) Tereza Melichárková (Spain) Ana Román Domínguez	6–1, 6–2
Win	2–0	Feb 2013	ITF Tlemcen, Algeria	G5	Clay	(Morocco) Ghita Nassik	(Italy) Federica Joe Gardella (United Kingdom) India Sanders	6–1, 3–6, [10–1]
Loss	2–1	Mar 2015	ITF Vinaròs, Spain	G2	Clay	(Italy) Lucrezia Stefanini	(Spain) Cristina Bucșa (Switzerland) Rebeka Masarova	0–1 ret.
Win	3–1	May 2015	ITF Prato, Italy	G2	Clay	(France) Lucie Wargnier	(Italy) Ingrid di Carlo (Italy) Rosanna Maffei	6–4, 6–3
Loss	3–2	May 2015	ITF Santa Croce, Italy	G1	Clay	(France) Lucie Wargnier	(Russia) Anna Blinkova (Russia) Olesya Pervushina	2–6, 3–6
Loss	3–3	Feb 2016	ITF El Menzah, Tunisia	G2	Hard	(Tunisia) Chiraz Bechri	(Morocco) Oumaima Aziz (Morocco) Diae El Jardi	w/o

== National representation ==
=== Fed Cup/Billie Jean King Cup ===
Ibbou made her Fed Cup debut for Algeria in 2015, while the team was competing in the Europe/Africa Zone Group III, when she was 16 years and 99 days old.

Group membership World Group World Group Play-off World Group II World Group II Play-off Europe/Africa Group (5–5)	Finals by surface Hard (1–1) Clay (4–4)	Matches by type Singles (2–2) Doubles (3–3)	Matches by setting Indoors (1–1) Outdoors (4–4)

==== Singles (2–2) ====
Edition	Stage	Date	Location	Against	Surface	Opponent	W/L	Score
2015	Z3 RR	Apr 2015	Ulcinj (MNE)	Norway	Clay	Melanie Stokke	W	6–3, 5–7, 6–3
2015	Z3 RR	Apr 2015	Ulcinj (MNE)	Denmark	Clay	Caroline Wozniacki	L	2–6, 1–6
2015	Z3 PO	Apr 2015	Ulcinj (MNE)	Montenegro	Clay	Kristina Samardžić	W	6–0, 6–1
2022	Z3 PO	Jun 2022	Ulcinj (MNE)	Morocco	Clay	Aya El Aouni	L	5–4 ret.

==== Doubles (3–3) ====
Edition	Stage	Date	Location	Against	Surface	Partner	Opponents	W/L	Score
2015	Z3 RR	Apr 2015	Ulcinj (MNE)	Norway	Clay	Amira Benaïssa	Caroline Rohde-Moe; Melanie Stokke	L	1–6, 4–6
2015	Z3 RR	Apr 2015	Ulcinj (MNE)	Denmark	Clay	Amira Benaïssa	Emilie Francati; Mai Grage	L	0–6, 0–6
2015	Z3 PO	Apr 2015	Ulcinj (MNE)	Montenegro	Clay	Amira Benaïssa	Nikoleta Bulatović; Kristina Samardžić	W	6–4, 6–2
2020–21	Z3 RR	Jun 2021	Vilnius (LTU)	Zimbabwe	Hard (i)	Inès Bekrar	Tadiwanashe Mauchi; Tanyaradzwa Midzi	W	6–2, 6–0
2020–21	Z3 RR	Jun 2021	Vilnius (LTU)	Malta	Hard (i)	Lynda Benkaddour	Elaine Genovese; Helene Pellicano	L	6–7^{(5–7)} ret.
2022	Z3 RR	Jun 2022	Ulcinj (MNE)	Cyprus	Clay	Amira Benaïssa	Maria Constantinou; Victoria Savvides	W	6–2, 6–2
