= Montreux Ladies Open =

- 2026 Montreux Nestlé Open

WTA 125
- Event name: Montreux Ladies Open
- Location: Montreux, Switzerland
- Venue: Montreux Tennis Club
- Category: WTA 125
- Surface: Clay
- Draw: 32S/16Q/8D
- Prize money: $115,000
- Website: www.montreuxladiesopen.ch

Current champions (2026)
- Singles: (France) Fiona Ferro
- Doubles: (Argentina) Nicole Fossa Huergo (Czech Republic) Lucie Havlíčková

The Montreux Ladies Open (French: Tournoi de tennis de Montreux) is a tournament for professional female tennis players played on outdoor clay courts. The event is classified as a WTA 125 event, after being upgraded from $60,000 ITF Women's Circuit tournament in 2024. It has been held in Montreux, Switzerland, since 2017.

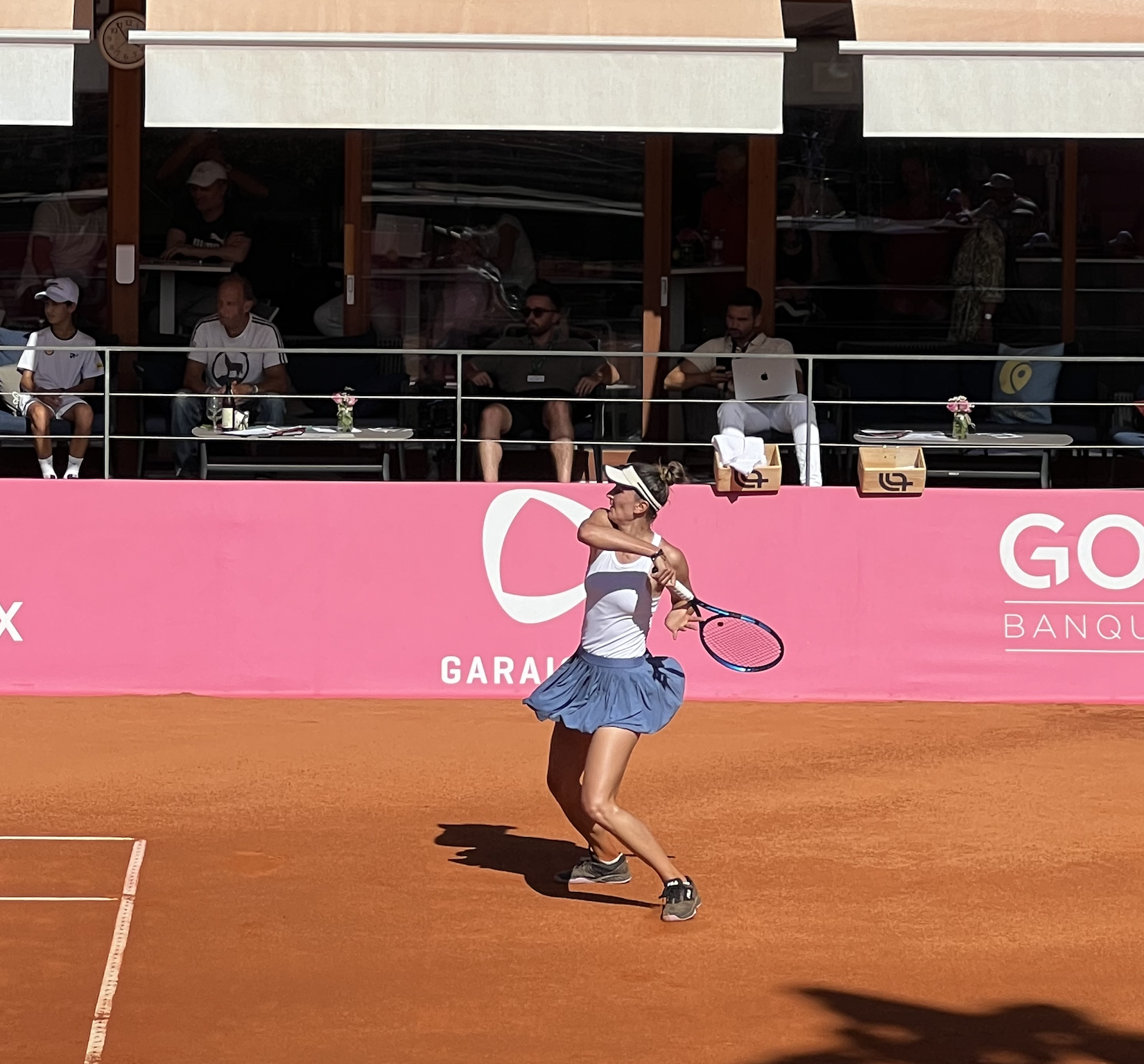
Irina-Camelia Begu, 2024 champion.

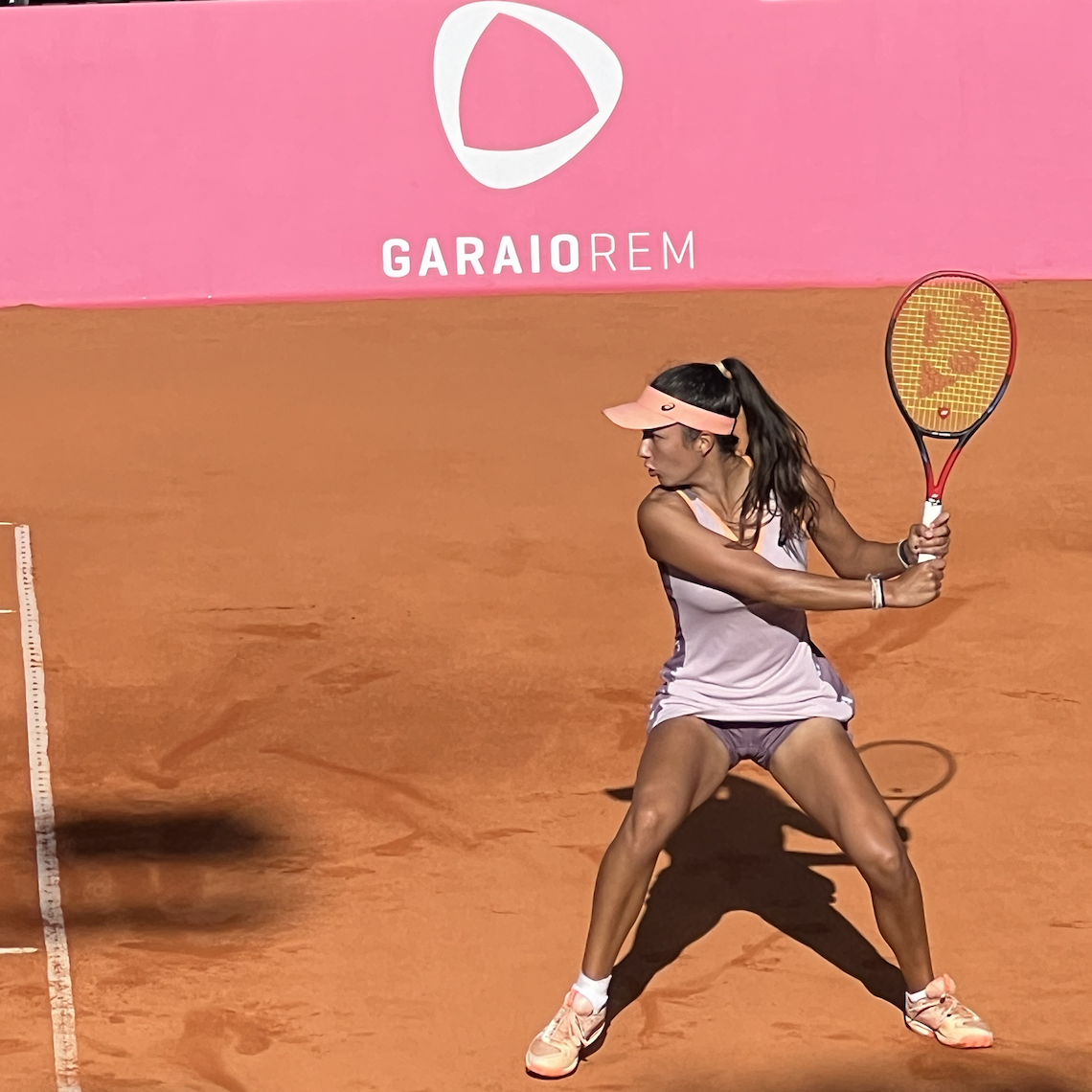
Petra Marčinko, 2024 runner-up.

== Past finals ==
=== Singles ===
| Year | Champion | Runners-up | Score |
|---|---|---|---|
| 2026 | (France) Fiona Ferro | (Germany) Noma Noha Akugue | 6–1, 6–2 |
| 2025 | (Poland) Maja Chwalińska | (Latvia) Darja Semeņistaja | 6–1, 6–2 |
| 2024 | (Romania) Irina-Camelia Begu | (Croatia) Petra Marčinko | 1–6, 6–3, 6–0 |
⬆️ WTA 125 event ⬆️
| 2023 | (Hungary) Anna Bondár | (Germany) Anna Gabric | 6–4, 6–1 |
| 2022 | (Germany) Tamara Korpatsch | (United States) Emma Navarro | 6–4, 6–1 |
| 2021 | (Brazil) Beatriz Haddad Maia | (United Kingdom) Francesca Jones | 6–4, 6–3 |
| 2020 | Tournament cancelled due to the COVID-19 pandemic | | |
| 2019 | (Serbia) Olga Danilović | (Austria) Julia Grabher | 6–2, 6–3 |
| 2018 | (Poland) Iga Świątek | (Belgium) Kimberley Zimmermann | 6–2, 6–2 |
| 2017 | (Spain) María Teresa Torró Flor | (Italy) Deborah Chiesa | 4–6, 6–1, 6–2 |

=== Doubles ===
| Year | Champions | Runners-up | Score |
|---|---|---|---|
| 2026 | (Argentina) Nicole Fossa Huergo (Czech Republic) Lucie Havlíčková | (France) Estelle Cascino (China) Feng Shuo | 6–3, 6–7^{(4–7)}, [10–8] |
| 2025 | Oksana Selekhmeteva (Switzerland) Simona Waltert | (Netherlands) Arantxa Rus (Romania) Anca Todoni | 6–4, 6–1 |
| 2024 | (United States) Quinn Gleason (Brazil) Ingrid Martins | (Argentina) María Lourdes Carlé (Switzerland) Simona Waltert | 6–3, 4–6, [10–7] |
⬆️ WTA 125 event ⬆️
| 2023 | Amina Anshba (Netherlands) Lexie Stevens | (Portugal) Francisca Jorge (Portugal) Matilde Jorge | 1–6, 7–5, [12–10] |
| 2022 | (Algeria) Inès Ibbou (Switzerland) Naïma Karamoko | (Switzerland) Jenny Dürst (Poland) Weronika Falkowska | 2–6, 6–3, [16–14] |
| 2021 | (France) Estelle Cascino (Italy) Camilla Rosatello | (Switzerland) Conny Perrin (United Kingdom) Eden Silva | 7–6^{(7–4)}, 6–4 |
| 2020 | Tournament cancelled due to the COVID-19 pandemic | | |
| 2019 | (Switzerland) Xenia Knoll (2) (Luxembourg) Mandy Minella | (Switzerland) Ylena In-Albon (Switzerland) Conny Perrin | 6–3, 6–4 |
| 2018 | (Romania) Andreea Mitu (Romania) Elena-Gabriela Ruse | (Brazil) Laura Pigossi (Belgium) Maryna Zanevska | 4–6, 6–3, [10–4] |
| 2017 | (Switzerland) Xenia Knoll (Switzerland) Amra Sadiković | (Slovakia) Michaela Hončová (Bulgaria) Isabella Shinikova | 6–2, 7–5 |
