= Nina Stadler =

Swiss tennis player

- Country (sports): Switzerland
- Born: 11 October 1995 (age 30) St. Gallen, Switzerland
- Retired: 2022
- Plays: Right-handed
- Prize money: $57,074

Singles
- Career record: 182–149
- Career titles: 1 ITF
- Highest ranking: No. 532 (24 September 2018)

Doubles
- Career record: 132–91
- Career titles: 13 ITF
- Highest ranking: No. 319 (7 March 2022)

Nina Stadler (born 11 October 1995) is a Swiss former professional tennis player.

Stadler has a career-high singles ranking by the Women's Tennis Association (WTA) of 532, which she reached on 24 September 2022. She also has a career-high WTA doubles ranking of 319, achieved on 7 March 2022. Stadler was particularly successful in doubles, she won 13 titles with various partners on the ITF Women's Circuit.

== Career ==
At the end of 2017, she entered semifinals in Stellenbosch, South Africa, losing to South African Chanel Simmonds.

In May 2021, she became champion with compatriot Jenny Dürst in Ramat HaSharon, Israel. The duo also reached the final in Jerusalem.

In September 2021, they played their third final in that season, becoming champions in Johannesburg, South Africa; they defeated the Dutch duo Eva Vedder and Stéphanie Visscher. The following week they ended runners-up in the city of Pretoria, losing to Russian Amina Anshba and American Elizabeth Mandlik in the final.

Stadler retired from professional tour in 2022. She started working as a tennis coach.
