= Jenny Dürst =

Swiss tennis player

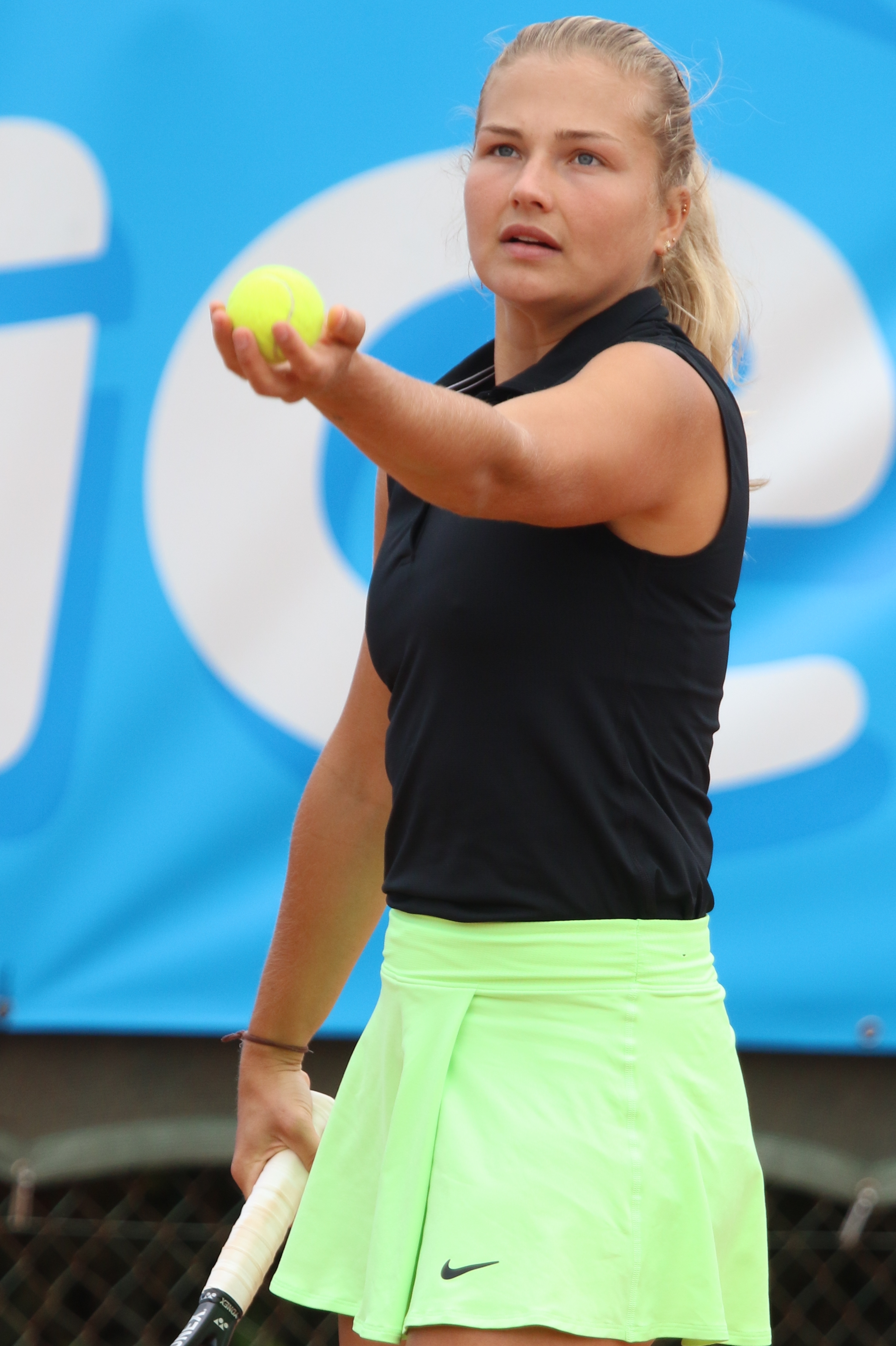
- Dürst at the 2021 ITF Biarritz
- ITF name: Jenny Duerst
- Country (sports): Switzerland
- Born: 25 March 1999 (age 27)
- Plays: Right-handed
- Prize money: $127,796

Singles
- Career record: 241–178
- Career titles: 3 ITF
- Highest ranking: No. 320 (16 June 2025)
- Current ranking: No. 736 (31 August 2026)

Doubles
- Career record: 187–103
- Career titles: 21 ITF
- Highest ranking: No. 187 (17 July 2023)
- Current ranking: No. 365 (31 August 2026)
- Last updated on: 3 September 2026.

Jenny Dürst (born 25 March 1999) is a Swiss tennis player. Dürst has a career-high singles ranking by the WTA of world No. 320, reached on 16 June 2025. She also has a career-high WTA doubles ranking of No. 187, achieved on 17 July 2023.

== Career ==
Dürst won her first $60k title at the 2022 Collonge-Bellerive Open in the doubles draw, partnering with Weronika Falkowska.

== ITF Circuit finals ==
=== Singles: 10 (3 titles, 7 runner-ups) ===
Legend W60 tournaments (0–1) W35 tournaments (1–2) W15 tournaments (2–4)	Finals by surface Hard (1–5) Clay (2–2)

Result	W–L	Date	Tournament	Tier	Surface	Opponent	Score
Loss	0–1	Mar 2021	ITF Sharm El Sheikh, Egypt	W15	Hard	(Russia) Erika Andreeva	6–1, 6–7^{(3)}, 0–6
Loss	0–2	Jul 2022	Open Araba en Femenino, Spain	W60	Hard	(France) Jessika Ponchet	4–6, 5–7
Loss	0–3	Nov 2023	ITF Sharm El Sheikh, Egypt	W15	Hard	Mariia Tkacheva	1–6, 2–6
Loss	0–4	Jun 2024	ITF Klosters, Switzerland	W35	Clay	(Poland) Gina Feistel	7–6^{(9)}, 2–6, 1–6
Win	1–4	Feb 2025	Wiphold International, South Africa	W15	Hard	(Netherlands) Stéphanie Visscher	6–1, 6–3
Loss	1–5	Feb 2025	Wiphold International, South Africa	W15	Hard	(Netherlands) Stéphanie Visscher	7–5, 1–6, 6–7^{(5)}
Win	2–5	Mar 2025	ITF Alaminos, Cyprus	W15	Clay	(Romania) Irina Fetecău	6–3, 3–6, 6–3
Loss	2–6	May 2025	ITF Platja d'Aro, Spain	W35	Clay	(Spain) Ane Mintegi del Olmo	6–3, 1–6, 3–6
Win	3–6	May 2025	ITF Orlando, United States	W35	Clay	(United States) Bella Payne	6–4, 6–4
Loss	3–7	Jun 2026	ITF Hillcrest, South Africa	W15	Hard	Polina Leykina	4–6, 4–6

=== Doubles: 37 (21 titles, 16 runner-ups) ===
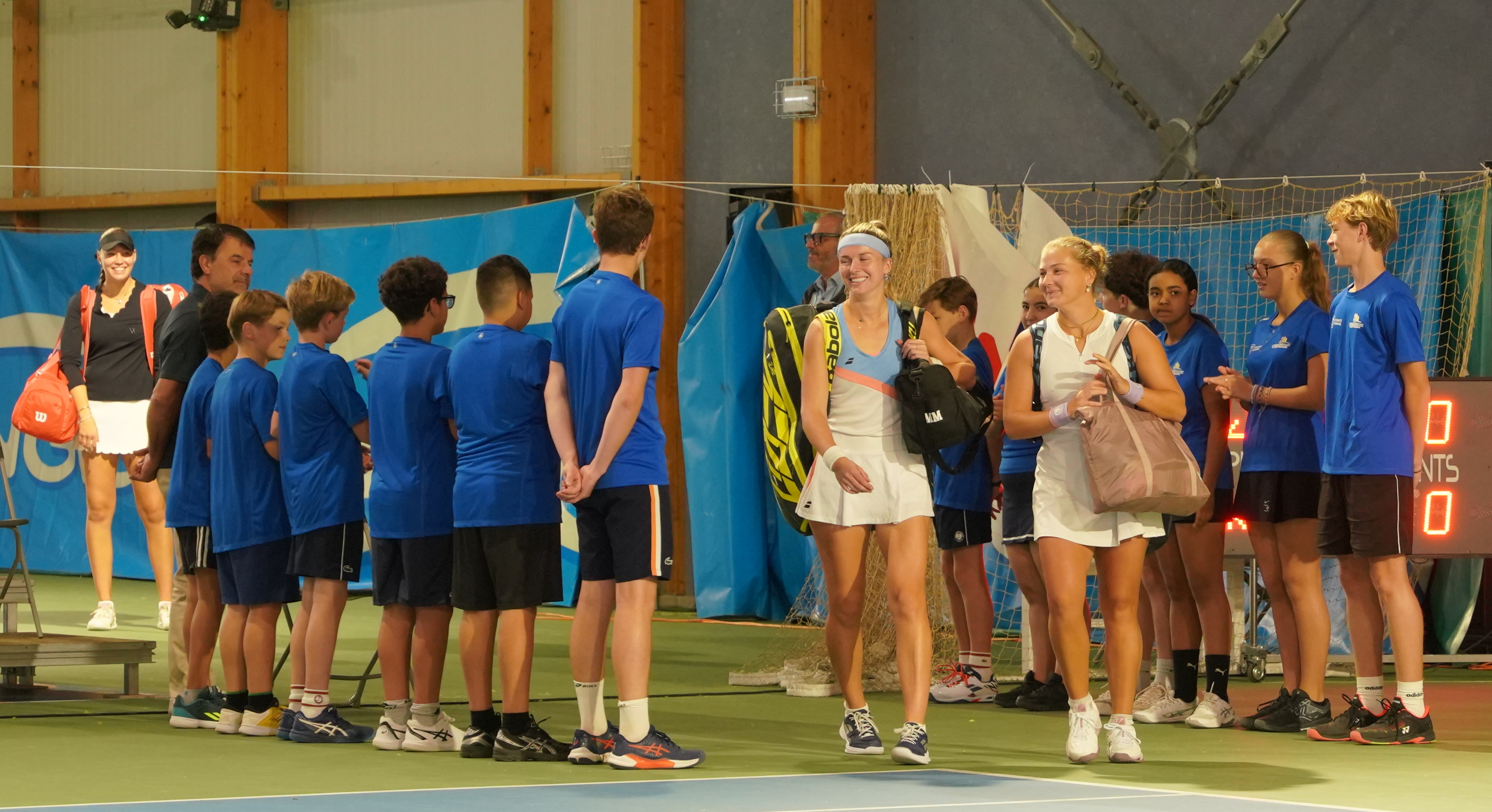
doubles with Marie Mattel

Legend W60/75 tournaments (2–3) W40/50 tournaments (0–1) W25/35 tournaments (9–8) W15 tournaments (10–4)	Finals by surface Hard (11–8) Clay (10–8)

Result	W–L	Date	Tournament	Tier	Surface	Partner	Opponents	Score
Win	1–0	Nov 2018	ITF Sharm El Sheikh, Egypt	W15	Hard	(Switzerland) Fiona Ganz	(Poland) Weronika Falkowska (Poland) Daria Kuczer	w/o
Win	2–0	Apr 2019	ITF Antalya, Turkey	W15	Clay	(Switzerland) Chiara Grimm	(Kyrgyzstan) Ksenia Palkina (China) Zhang Ying	w/o
Win	3–0	May 2019	ITF Antalya, Turkey	W15	Clay	(Switzerland) Chiara Grimm	(Russia) Ekaterina Kazionova (Russia) Aleksandra Pospelova	3–6, 6–1, [10–3]
Loss	3–1	Nov 2019	ITF Antalya, Turkey	W15	Hard	(Romania) Ioana Gașpar	(Japan) Haine Ogata (Japan) Aiko Yoshitomi	1–6, 1–6
Win	4–1	May 2021	ITF Ramat Hasharon, Israel	W15	Hard	(Switzerland) Nina Stadler	(Israel) Lina Glushko (Israel) Shavit Kimchi	1–6, 6–4, [10–6]
Loss	4–2	May 2021	ITF Jerusalem, Israel	W15	Hard	(Switzerland) Nina Stadler	(United Kingdom) Emily Appleton (United Kingdom) Alicia Barnett	4–6, 6–2, [9–11]
Win	5–2	May 2021	ITF Tbilisi, Georgia	W15	Hard	(Poland) Weronika Falkowska	(Turkey) Ayla Aksu (Russia) Valeriia Olianovskaia	6–3, 6–2
Loss	5–3	Jun 2021	ITF Klosters, Switzerland	W25	Clay	(Poland) Weronika Falkowska	(Russia) Amina Anshba (Czech Republic) Anastasia Dețiuc	6–3, 1–6, [3–10]
Win	6–3	Sep 2021	Soweto Open, South Africa	W25	Hard	(Switzerland) Nina Stadler	(Netherlands) Eva Vedder (Netherlands) Stéphanie Visscher	6–7^{(5)}, 7–5, [11–9]
Loss	6–4	Oct 2021	ITF Pretoria, South Africa	W25	Hard	(Switzerland) Nina Stadler	(Russia) Amina Anshba (United States) Elizabeth Mandlik	2–6, 2–6
Loss	6–5	Dec 2021	ITF Monastir, Tunisia	W15	Hard	(Hong Kong) Cody Wong	(Spain) Celia Cerviño Ruiz (Hong Kong) Maggie Ng	2–6, 4–6
Loss	6–6	Jun 2022	Carinthian Ladies Trophy, Austria	W60	Clay	(Poland) Weronika Falkowska	(United States) Jessie Aney (Czech Republic) Anna Sisková	3–6, 4–6
Win	7–6	Sep 2022	Collonge-Bellerive Open, Switzerland	W60	Clay	(Poland) Weronika Falkowska	(Sweden) Jacqueline Cabaj Awad (Czech Republic) Michaela Bayerlová	7–6^{(5)}, 6–1
Loss	7–7	Sep 2022	Montreux Ladies Open, Switzerland	W60	Clay	(Poland) Weronika Falkowska	(Algeria) Inès Ibbou (Switzerland) Naïma Karamoko	6–2, 3–6, [14–16]
Loss	7–8	Nov 2022	ITF Sharm El Sheikh, Egypt	W25	Hard	(South Korea) Park So-hyun	Polina Iatcenko; Alina Korneeva	1–6, 7–6^{(1)}, [5–10]
Win	8–8	Jan 2023	ITF Fort-de-France, Martinique	W15	Hard	(Sweden) Fanny Östlund	(Canada) Bianca Fernandez (United States) Anna Ulyashchenko	6–4, 3–6, [10–4]
Win	9–8	Jan 2023	ITF Petit-Bourg, Guadeloupe	W25	Hard	(Sweden) Fanny Östlund	(United States) Clervie Ngounoue (Denmark) Johanne Svendsen	6–4, 6–3
Win	10–8	May 2023	ITF Båstad, Sweden	W25	Clay	(Sweden) Fanny Östlund	(Poland) Martyna Kubka (Kazakhstan) Zhibek Kulambayeva	6–4, 6–7^{(3)}, [10–7]
Win	11–8	May 2023	ITF Warmbad Villach, Austria	W25	Clay	(Slovenia) Nika Radišić	(United States) Jessie Aney (Germany) Lena Papadakis	6–2, 7–6^{(4)}
Loss	11–9	May 2023	ITF Annenheim, Austria	W25	Clay	(Czech Republic) Michaela Bayerlová	(Hungary) Amarissa Tóth; Anna Zyryanova	4–6, 6–2, [8–10]
Loss	11–10	Jun 2023	ITF Ystad, Sweden	W40	Clay	(Sweden) Fanny Östlund	(Australia) Astra Sharma (Ukraine) Valeriya Strakhova	6–4, 6–7^{(3)}, [9–11]
Loss	11–11	Jul 2023	ITF Parnu, Estonia	W25	Clay	(Croatia) Lucija Ćirić Bagarić	(Italy) Nicole Fossa Huergo (Germany) Luisa Meyer auf der Heide	5–7, 5–7
Loss	11–12	Sep 2023	ITF Leiria, Portugal	W25	Hard	(Belgium) Sofia Costoulas	(Portugal) Francisca Jorge (Portugal) Matilde Jorge	5–7, 6–7^{(5)}
Loss	11–13	Nov 2023	ITF Sharm El Sheikh, Egypt	W15	Hard	(Switzerland) Paula Cembranos	Ekaterina Shalimova; Mariia Tkacheva	2–6, 6–3, [6–10]
Win	12–13	Jan 2024	ITF Petit-Bourg, Guadeloupe, France	W35	Hard	(Sweden) Fanny Östlund	(Germany) Sina Herrmann (Germany) Antonia Schmidt	6–2, 7–5
Win	13–13	May 2024	ITF Kuršumlijska Banja, Serbia	W15	Clay	(Poland) Daria Kuczer	(Germany) Tea Lukic (Serbia) Natalija Senić	6–3, 6–1
Win	14–13	Jun 2024	ITF Klosters, Switzerland	W35	Clay	(Slovakia) Nina Vargová	(Germany) Katharina Hobgarski (Germany) Antonia Schmidt	6–2, 4–6, [10–8]
Win	15–13	Aug 2024	ITF Cluj-Napoca, Romania	W35	Clay	(Romania) Oana Gavrilă	(Romania) Briana Szabó (Romania) Patricia Maria Țig	6–1, 6–0
Win	16–13	Sep 2024	ITF Madrid, Spain	W15	Hard	(Republic of Ireland) Celine Simunyu	(Uzbekistan) Vlada Ekshibarova (United Kingdom) Emma Wilson	6–4, 6–4
Loss	16–14	Apr 2025	Bellinzona Ladies Open, Switzerland	W75	Clay	(United States) Elizabeth Mandlik	(Czech Republic) Aneta Kučmová (Greece) Sapfo Sakellaridi	6–7^{(3)}, 6–3, [2–10]
Win	17–14	May 2025	ITF Platja d'Aro, Spain	W35	Clay	(Switzerland) Valentina Ryser	(Spain) María Martínez Vaquero (Spain) Alba Rey García	6–4, 7–5
Loss	17–15	May 2025	ITF Orlando, United States	W35	Clay	(Canada) Dasha Plekhanova	(United States) Allura Zamarripa (United States) Maribella Zamarripa	3–6, 1–6
Win	18–15	Sep 2025	ITF Bucharest, Romania	W75	Clay	(Slovakia) Nina Vargová	(Algeria) Inès Ibbou (Greece) Despina Papamichail	6–1, 6–1
Loss	18–16	Sep 2025	ITF Reims, France	W35	Hard (i)	(France) Marie Mattel	(Netherlands) Joy de Zeeuw (Netherlands) Sarah van Emst	3–6, 4–6
Win	19–16	Jun 2026	ITF Hillcrest, South Africa	W15	Hard	(France) Astrid Cirotte	(South Africa) Morgan Jordaan (South Africa) Donna Le Roux	6–7^{(4)}, 6–3, [10–8]
Win	20–16	Jul 2026	ITF Hillcrest, South Africa	W35	Hard	(France) Astrid Cirotte	Polina Leykina; Ksenia Smirnova	4–6, 6–2, [10–7]
Win	21–16	Jul 2026	ITF Hillcrest, South Africa	W15	Hard	(France) Astrid Cirotte	(South Africa) Morgan Jordaan (South Africa) Donna Le Roux	6–1, 6–2
