= Tess Sugnaux =

Swiss tennis player (born 1995)

- Country (sports): Switzerland
- Born: 3 March 1995 (age 30)
- Plays: Right (two-handed backhand)
- Prize money: US$107,494

Singles
- Career record: 379–318
- Career titles: 2 ITF
- Highest ranking: No. 413 (8 May 2017)
- Current ranking: No. 697 (18 November 2024)

Doubles
- Career record: 78–68
- Career titles: 5 ITF
- Highest ranking: No. 542 (1 August 2022)
- Current ranking: No. 866 (18 November 2024)
- Last updated on: 18 November 2024.

Tess Sugnaux (born 3 March 1995) is a Swiss tennis player.

Sugnaux has a career-high singles ranking of 413 by the Women's Tennis Association (WTA), achieved on 8 May 2017. She also has a career-high WTA doubles ranking of 542, set on 1 August 2022. She has won two singles and five doubles titles on the ITF Women's Circuit.

Sugnaux made her WTA Tour debut at the 2019 Ladies Open Lausanne, when she received a wildcard into the main draw, losing in the first round to Jasmine Paolini in straight sets. She also received a wildcard entry into the 2021 edition of the same tournament, but again lost in the first round in straight sets to an Italian, this time Lucia Bronzetti.

== ITF Circuit finals ==
=== Singles: 16 (2 titles, 14 runner–ups) ===
Legend W50 tournaments W35 tournaments W10/15 tournaments (2–14)	Finals by surface Hard (1–7) Clay (1–6) Carpet (0–1)

Result	W–L	Date	Tournament	Tier	Surface	Opponent	Score
Loss	0–1	Apr 2013	ITF Les Franqueses del Vallès, Spain	W10	Hard	(France) Océane Dodin	3–6, 3–6
Loss	0–2	Jul 2013	ITF Knokke, Belgium	W10	Clay	(Italy) Gaia Sanesi	3–6, 3–6
Loss	0–3	May 2014	ITF Santa Margherita di Pula, Italy	W10	Clay	(Colombia) Yuliana Lizarazo	2–6, 1–6
Loss	0–4	Jun 2014	ITF Rome, Italy	W10	Clay	(Italy) Liudmila Samsonova	2–6, 6–2, 4–6
Loss	0–5	Nov 2014	ITF Oslo, Norway	W10	Hard (i)	(Norway) Emma Flood	3–6, 3–6
Loss	0–6	Nov 2014	ITF Helsinki, Finland	W10	Hard (i)	(Republic of Ireland) Amy Bowtell	2–6, 3–6
Win	1–6	Jun 2016	ITF Madrid, Spain	W10	Clay	(Norway) Melanie Stokke	6–4, 7–5
Loss	1–7	Jun 2016	ITF Madrid, Spain	W10	Clay	(France) Margot Yerolymos	3–6, 6–4, 3–6
Loss	1–8	Sep 2016	ITF Santa Margherita di Pula, Italy	W10	Clay	(Italy) Alice Balducci	4–6, 1–6
Loss	1–9	Oct 2016	Ismaning Open, Germany	W10	Carpet (i)	(Ukraine) Anastasia Zarycká	2–6, 6–7^{(6)}
Loss	1–10	Nov 2016	GB Pro-Series Shrewsbury, UK	W10	Hard (i)	(Czech Republic) Petra Krejsová	1–6, 5–7
Loss	1–11	Nov 2017	ITF Helsinki, Finland	W15	Hard (i)	(United Kingdom) Eden Silva	3–6, 6–1, 5–7
Loss	1–12	Mar 2018	ITF Mâcon, France	W15	Hard (i)	(Switzerland) Simona Waltert	4–6, 6–3, 3–6
Loss	1–13	Aug 2018	ITF Caslano, Switzerland	W15	Clay	(Switzerland) Sandy Marti	2–6, 2–6
Loss	1–14	Oct 2021	ITF Monastir, Tunisia	W15	Hard	(Switzerland) Sebastianna Scilipoti	3–6, 1–6
Win	2–14	Dec 2022	ITF Lousada, Portugal	W15	Hard (i)	(Switzerland) Valentina Ryser	6–1, 6–2

=== Doubles: 10 (5 titles, 5 runner–ups) ===
Legend W25 tournaments (0–1) W10/15 tournaments (5–4)	Finals by surface Hard (4–2) Clay (1–3)

Result	W–L	Date	Tournament	Tier	Surface	Partner	Opponents	Score
Loss	0–1	Aug 2012	ITF Pörtschach, Austria	W10	Clay	(Switzerland) Lara Michel	(Italy) Angelica Moratelli (Serbia) Milana Špremo	1–6, 6–4, [10–4]
Win	1–1	Jun 2013	ITF Amarante, Portugal	W10	Hard	(Portugal) Rita Vilaça	(Argentina) Aranza Salut (Argentina) Carolina Zeballos	7–5, 7–5
Loss	1–2	Jun 2013	ITF Guimarães, Portugal	W10	Clay	(Portugal) Rita Vilaça	(Russia) Natela Dzalamidze (Spain) Arabela Fernandez Rabener	6–3, 3–6, [3–10]
Loss	1–3	Sep 2015	ITF Santa Margherita di Pula, Italy	W10	Clay	(Belgium) India Maggen	(Italy) Bianca Turati (Italy) Liudmila Samsonova	4–6, 2–6
Win	2–3	Mar 2016	ITF Weston, United States	W10	Clay	(United States) Katerina Stewart	(Argentina) Julieta Estable (Italy) Jasmine Paolini	7–6^{(2)}, 6–3
Win	3–3	Nov 2017	ITF Helsinki, Finland	W15	Hard (i)	(Switzerland) Naïma Karamoko	(Russia) Anastasia Kulikova (Estonia) Elena Malygina	7–5, 6–2
Win	4–3	Mar 2019	ITF Cancún, Mexico	W15	Hard	(France) Lou Brouleau	(United States) Paige Hourigan (United States) Rasheeda McAdoo	6–4, 6–3
Loss	4–4	May 2022	ITF Tbilisi, Georgia	W25	Hard	(Switzerland) Arlinda Rushiti	(Bosnia and Herzegovina) Nefisa Berberović (China) Lu Jiajing	2–6, 6–4, [7–10]
Loss	4–5	Nov 2022	ITF Lousada, Portugal	W15	Hard (i)	(Spain) Celia Cerviño Ruiz	(France) Océane Babel (Switzerland) Leonie Küng	6–7^{(3)}, 7–5, [2–10]
Win	5–5	Feb 2024	ITF Monastir, Tunisia	W15	Hard	(Switzerland) Naïma Karamoko	(Switzerland) Alina Granwehr (Switzerland) Karolina Kozakova	5–7, 6–2, [10–7]
