= Chiara Scholl =

American tennis player

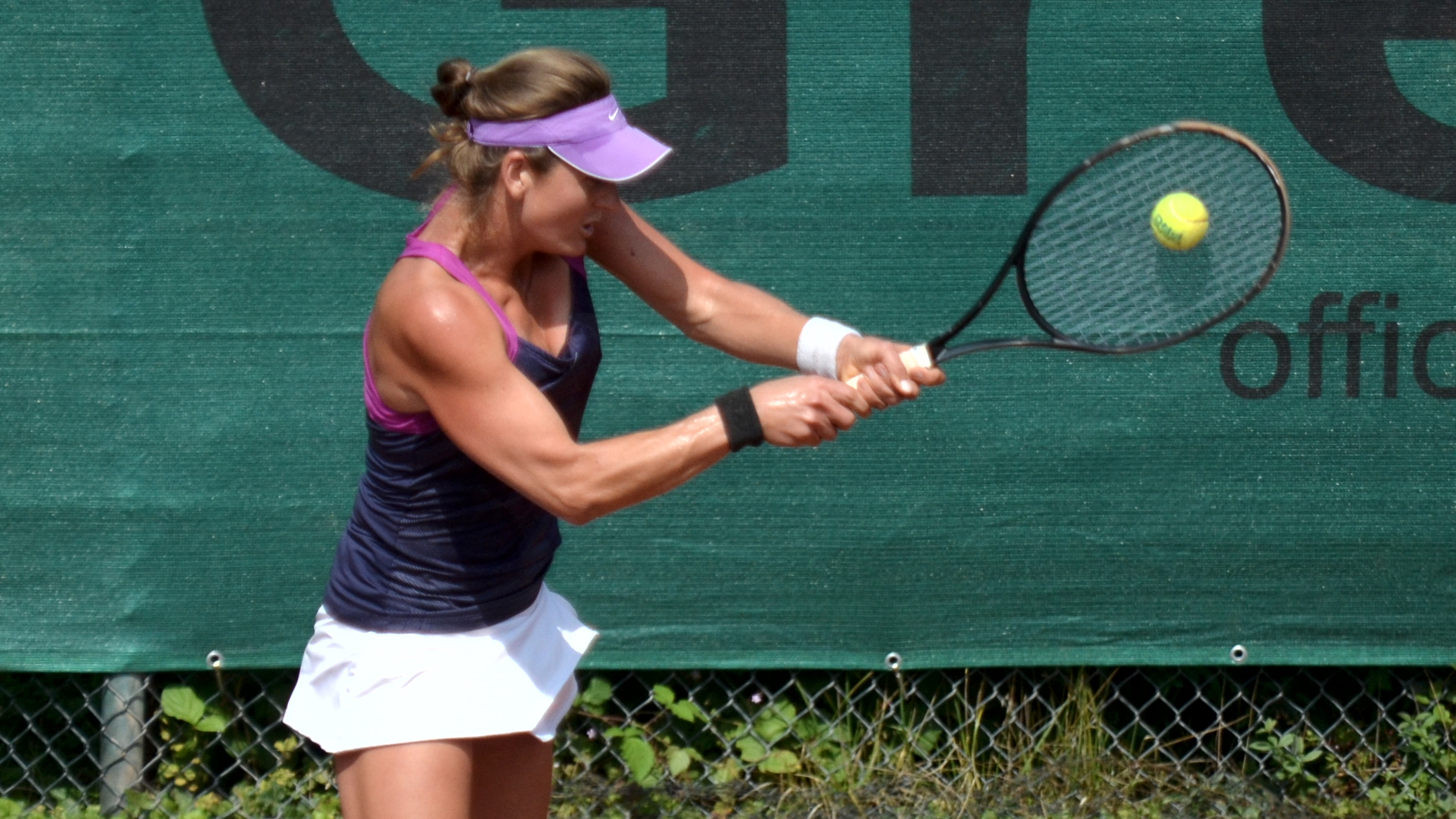
- Country (sports): United States
- Born: July 5, 1992 (age 34) United States
- Prize money: $270,205

Singles
- Career record: 444–381
- Career titles: 11 ITF
- Highest ranking: No. 164 (October 17, 2011)

Doubles
- Career record: 282–221
- Career titles: 25 ITF
- Highest ranking: No. 187 (August 13, 2018)

Chiara "Chichi" Scholl (born July 5, 1992) is an American inactive tennis player.

Scholl has won 11 singles and 25 doubles titles on the ITF Women's Circuit. On 17 October 2011, she reached her best singles ranking of world No. 164. On 13 August 2018, she peaked at No. 187 in the WTA doubles rankings.

== ITF Circuit finals ==
=== Singles: 20 (11 titles, 9 runner-ups) ===
Legend $50,000 tournaments $25,000 tournaments $10/15,000 tournaments	Finals by surface Hard (3–5) Clay (8–4)

Result	W–L	Date	Tournament	Tier	Surface	Opponent	Score
Loss	0–1	Jul 2010	ITF Evansville, United States	10k	Hard	(Venezuela) Gabriela Paz	4–6, 0–6
Win	1–1	Jun 2011	ITF El Paso, US	25k	Hard	(Slovenia) Petra Rampre	7–5, 7–5
Win	2–1	Jul 2011	Lexington Challenger, US	50k	Hard	(United States) Amanda Fink	6–1, 6–1
Loss	2–2	Jun 2012	ITF Lenzerheide, Switzerland	25k	Clay	(Serbia) Aleksandra Krunić	3–6, 3–6
Win	3–2	Jul 2016	ITF Saint-Gervais-les-Bains, France	10k	Clay	(France) Constance Sibille	6–2, 6–2
Loss	3–3	Aug 2016	ITF Oldenzaal, Netherlands	10k	Clay	(Italy) Georgia Brescia	2–6, 6–3, 4–6
Win	4–3	Aug 2016	ITF Rotterdam, Netherlands	10k	Clay	(Denmark) Karen Barritza	7–6^{(4)}, 5–7, 7–6^{(8)}
Win	5–3	Aug 2016	ITF Schoonhoven, Netherlands	10k	Clay	(France) Chloé Paquet	6–1, 6–4
Win	6–3	Sep 2016	ITF Engis, Belgium	10k	Clay	(Belgium) Déborah Kerfs	6–1, 6–0
Loss	6–4	Aug 2017	ITF Bad Saulgau, Germany	25k+H	Clay	(Romania) Elena-Gabriela Ruse	1–6, 2–6
Win	7–4	Aug 2017	ITF Oldenzaal, Netherlands	15k	Clay	(Uzbekistan) Albina Khabibulina	6–1, 6–1
Win	8–4	Oct 2017	ITF Pula, Italy	25k	Clay	(Slovakia) Michaela Hončová	6–1, 4–6, 6–1
Win	9–4	Dec 2017	ITF Santiago, Chile	25k	Clay	(Mexico) Marcela Zacarías	6–3, 6–2
Loss	9–5	Nov 2018	ITF Monastir, Tunisia	15k	Hard	(Romania) Ilona Georgiana Ghioroaie	1–6, 3–6
Loss	9–6	Dec 2018	ITF Monastir, Tunisia	15k	Hard	(Switzerland) Leonie Küng	2–6, 1–6
Loss	9–7	Dec 2018	ITF Monastir, Tunisia	15k	Hard	(Italy) Claudia Giovine	0–6, 0–6
Loss	9–8	Dec 2018	ITF Monastir, Tunisia	15k	Hard	(Italy) Claudia Giovine	1–6, 6–7^{(6)}
Win	10–8	Dec 2019	ITF Heraklion, Greece	W15	Clay	(Croatia) Oleksandra Oliynykova	6–2, 5–7, 6–1
Win	11–8	Feb 2022	ITF Monastir, Tunisia	W15	Hard	(Japan) Haruna Arakawa	6–2, 6–4
Loss	11–9	Jun 2022	ITF Alkmaar, Netherlands	W15	Clay	(Estonia) Maileen Nuudi	2–6, 7–5, 4–6

=== Doubles: 48 (25 titles, 23 runner-ups) ===
Legend W50/60 tournaments W50 tournaments W25 tournaments W10/15 tournaments	Finals by surface Hard (9–6) Clay (16–16) Carpet (0–1)

Result	W–L	Date	Tournament	Tier	Surface	Partner	Opponents	Score
Win	1–0	Jun 2011	ITF El Paso, US	25k	Hard	(Ukraine) Alyona Sotnikova	(United States) Amanda Fink (United States) Yasmin Schnack	7–5, 4–6, [10–8]
Win	2–0	Jul 2011	Lexington Challenger, US	50k	Hard	(Belgium) Tamaryn Hendler	(United States) Lindsay Lee-Waters (United States) Megan Moulton-Levy	7–6^{(9)}, 3–6, [10–7]
Loss	2–1	Oct 2012	ITF Rock Hill, US	25k	Hard	(United States) Hsu Chieh-yu	(United States) Jacqueline Cako (United States) Natalie Pluskota	2–6, 3–6
Loss	2–2	Oct 2015	ITF Florence, US	25k	Hard	(Latvia) Diāna Marcinkēviča	(Bosnia and Herzegovina) Ema Burgić Bucko (United States) Keri Wong	6–7^{(6)}, 1–6
Loss	2–3	Jul 2016	ITF Maaseik, Belgium	10k	Clay	(Belgium) Déborah Kerfs	(Australia) Sally Peers (Australia) Ellen Perez	2–6, 2–6
Loss	2–4	Aug 2016	ITF Rebecq, Belgium	10k	Clay	(Poland) Justyna Jegiołka	(United Kingdom) Emily Arbuthnott (Germany) Katharina Hobgarski	1–6, 1–6
Win	3–4	Aug 2016	ITF Oldenzaal, Netherlands	10k	Clay	(Belgium) Déborah Kerfs	(Germany) Lisa-Marie Mätschke (Australia) Alana Parnaby	6–3, 6–4
Win	4–4	Aug 2016	ITF Rotterdam, Netherlands	10k	Clay	(Denmark) Karen Barritza	(Netherlands) Rosalie van der Hoek (Belarus) Sviatlana Pirazhenka	6–2, 6–3
Win	5–4	Aug 2016	ITF Schoonhoven, Netherlands	10k	Clay	(Belgium) Déborah Kerfs	(Netherlands) Erika Vogelsang (Netherlands) Mandy Wagemaker	6–1, 6–2
Win	6–4	Sep 2016	ITF Engis, Belgium	10k	Clay	(Belgium) Déborah Kerfs	(Switzerland) Chiara Grimm (Switzerland) Nina Stadler	6–2, 6–7^{(2)}, [10–4]
Loss	6–5	Feb 2017	Rancho Santa Fe Open, US	25k	Hard	(Ukraine) Anhelina Kalinina	(United States) Kayla Day (United States) Caroline Dolehide	3–6, 6–1, [7–10]
Loss	6–6	Mar 2017	ITF Orlando, US	15k	Clay	(Mexico) Marcela Zacarías	(United States) Emina Bektas (United States) Sanaz Marand	1–6, 3–6
Win	7–6	Aug 2017	ITF Oldenzaal, Netherlands	15k	Clay	(Belgium) Déborah Kerfs	(Argentina) Paula Ormaechea (Mexico) Ana Sofía Sánchez	7–5, 6–3
Loss	7–7	Aug 2017	ITF Rotterdam, Netherlands	15k	Clay	(Belgium) Déborah Kerfs	(Uzbekistan) Albina Khabibulina (Netherlands) Stephanie Visscher	6–7^{(3)}, 5–7
Win	8–7	Sep 2017	ITF Schoonhoven, Netherlands	15k	Clay	(Belgium) Déborah Kerfs	(United States) Dasha Ivanova (Bulgaria) Ani Vangelova	5–7, 6–2, [10–3]
Win	9–7	Oct 2017	ITF Pula, Italy	25k	Clay	(Italy) Anastasia Grymalska	(Slovakia) Michaela Hončová (Japan) Akiko Omae	4–6, 6–3, [13–11]
Win	10–7	Nov 2017	ITF Norman, US	25k	Hard	(Belgium) Tamaryn Hendler	(United States) Maria Sanchez (United States) Caitlin Whoriskey	3–6, 6–3, [10–6]
Win	11–7	Dec 2017	ITF Santiago, Chile	15k	Clay	(Mexico) Marcela Zacarías	(Argentina) Eugenia Ganga (Argentina) Melany Krywoj	7–6^{(2)}, 4–6, [10–6]
Loss	11–8	Apr 2018	ITF Pula, Italy	25k	Clay	(Bosnia and Herzegovina) Jelena Simić	(Netherlands) Bibiane Schoofs (Slovakia) Chantal Škamlová	2–6, 6–3, [7–10]
Win	12–8	Apr 2018	ITF Pula, Italy	25k	Clay	(Australia) Naiktha Bains	(Belgium) Marie Benoît (China) Xu Shilin	6–4, 7–5
Loss	12–9	May 2018	ITF Bisbal d'Emporda, Italy	25k+H	Clay	(Spain) Yvonne Cavallé Reimers	(United States) Jamie Loeb (Mexico) Ana Sofia Sanchez	3–6, 2–6
Loss	12–10	Jul 2018	ITF Aschaffenburg, Germany	25k	Clay	(Finland) Emma Laine	(Russia) Polina Leykina (Bulgaria) Isabella Shinikova	6–7^{(4)}, 5–7
Loss	12–11	Aug 2018	ITF Bad Saulgau, Germany	25k+H	Clay	(Croatia) Lea Bošković	(Uzbekistan) Albina Khabibulina (Belgium) Hélène Scholsen	2–6, 4–6
Win	13–11	Nov 2018	ITF Monastir, Tunisia	15k	Hard	(Switzerland) Chiara Grimm	(France) Irys Ekani (France) Kélia Le Bihan	6–2, 6–1
Loss	13–12	Dec 2018	ITF Monastir, Tunisia	15k	Hard	(Switzerland) Nicole Gadient	(Serbia) Tamara Čurović (Croatia) Silvia Njirić	6–7^{(2)}, 6–4, [6–10]
Win	14–12	Dec 2018	ITF Monastir, Tunisia	15k	Hard	(Serbia) Tamara Čurović	(United Kingdom) Ali Collins (Italy) Claudia Giovine	7–6^{(5)}, 6–4
Win	15–12	Dec 2018	ITF Monastir, Tunisia	15k	Hard	(Australia) Alicia Smith	(Italy) Giorgia Marchetti (Italy) Angelica Raggi	6–1, 6–3
Win	16–12	Mar 2019	ITF Tabarka, Tunisia	W15	Clay	(Switzerland) Nicole Gadient	(Japan) Nagomi Higashitani (Japan) Satsuki Koike	7–5, 7–5
Win	17–12	May 2019	ITF Pula, Italy	W25	Clay	(Brazil) Gabriela Cé	(United Kingdom) Naiktha Bains (Hungary) Anna Bondár	6–0, 7–5
Loss	17–13	Jul 2019	ITF Stuttgart, Germany	W25	Clay	(Serbia) Tamara Čurović	(Russia) Alena Fomina (Slovakia) Vivien Juhaszová	6–2, 2–6, [12–14]
Win	18–13	Sep 2019	ITF Pula, Italy	W25	Clay	(Mexico) Fernanda Contreras	(Italy) Monica Cappelletti (Italy) Melania Delai	6–4, 6–1
Loss	18–14	Sep 2019	ITF Pula, Italy	W25	Clay	(Ukraine) Ganna Poznikhirenko	(France) Estelle Cascino (Italy) Giorgia Marchetti	4–6, 3–6
Win	19–14	Dec 2019	ITF Heraklion, Greece	W15	Clay	(Bulgaria) Stela Peeva	(Ukraine) Mariia Bergen (Russia) Alina Lebedeva	6–0, 6–3
Loss	19–15	Feb 2019	AK Ladies Open, Germany	W25	Carpet (i)	(United Kingdom) Anna Popescu	(Romania) Andreea Mitu (Romania) Laura Ioana Paar	5–7, 2–6
Loss	19–16	Mar 2021	ITF Monastir, Tunisia	W15	Hard	(United Kingdom) Anna Popescu	(Romania) Oana Gavrilă (Romania) Ilona Georgiana Ghioroaie	5–7, 4–6
Win	20–16	May 2021	ITF Monastir, Tunisia	W15	Hard	(United States) Dalayna Hewitt	(United States) Emma Davis (Colombia) María Paulina Pérez	6–4, 6–2
Win	21–16	Jul 2021	ITF Les Contamines-Montjoie, France	W25	Hard	(Latvia) Diāna Marcinkēviča	(Argentina) María Carlé (Switzerland) Ylena In-Albon	3–6, 6–2, [10–7]
Loss	21–17	Aug 2021	ITF Braunschweig, Germany	W25	Clay	(Austria) Tamira Paszek	(Germany) Katharina Hobgarski (Ukraine) Valeriya Strakhova	6–3, 2–6, [10–12]
Loss	21–18	Jun 2022	ITF Alkmaar, Netherlands	W15	Clay	(Netherlands) Lexie Stevens	(Russia) Valeriia Olianovskaia (Poland) Stefania Rogozińska Dzik	3–6, 7–5, [6–10]
Loss	21–19	Aug 2022	Ladies Open Hechingen, Germany	W60	Clay	(Serbia) Tamara Čurović	(Russia) Irina Khromacheva (Russia) Diana Shnaider	2–6, 3–6
Win	22–19	Aug 2022	ITF Erwitte, Germany	W15	Clay	(Japan) Lisa-Marie Rioux	(Greece) Martha Matoula (Romania) Arina Vasilescu	6–7^{(5)}, 6–1, [10–7]
Win	23–19	Dec 2022	ITF Monastir, Tunisia	W25	Hard	(Greece) Sapfo Sakellaridi	(United Kingdom) Emilie Lindh (Japan) Eri Shimizu	6–3, 6–3
Loss	23–20	Mar 2023	Open de Touraine, France	W25	Hard (i)	(Bosnia and Herzegovina) Anita Wagner	(Slovenia) Veronika Erjavec (Lithuania) Justina Mikulskytė	4–6, 0–6
Loss	23–21	Apr 2023	ITF Pula, Italy	W25	Clay	(Canada) Bianca Fernandez	(Japan) Misaki Matsuda (Japan) Ikumi Yamazaki	6–4, 2–6, [9–11]
Win	24–21	May 2023	ITF Feld am See, Austria	W25	Clay	(Czech Republic) Denisa Hindová	(Belgium) Sofia Costoulas (Canada) Kayla Cross	6–2, 6–0
Loss	24–22	Jun 2023	ITF Troisdorf, Germany	W25	Clay	(Belgium) Tilwith di Girolami	(Belgium) Sofia Costoulas (Belgium) Lara Salden	6–7^{(4)}, 4–6
Win	25–22	Jul 2023	ITF Alkmaar, Netherlands	W15	Clay	(Belgium) Tilwith di Girolami	(Netherlands) Rose Marie Nijkamp (Netherlands) Louise van den Broek	6–2, 6–1
Loss	25–23	Jun 2024	ITF Troisdorf, Germany	W50	Clay	(Germany) Yana Morderger	(Cyprus) Raluca Șerban (Romania) Anca Todoni	1–6, 3–6
