= Valentina Ryser =

Swiss tennis player (born 2001)

- Country (sports): Switzerland
- Born: 22 March 2001 (age 25)
- Plays: Right (two-handed backhand)
- Prize money: $231,029

Singles
- Career record: 212–133
- Career titles: 7 ITF
- Highest ranking: No. 213 (17 March 2025)
- Current ranking: No. 374 (4 May 2026)

Grand Slam singles results
- French Open: Q1 (2025)
- Wimbledon: Q3 (2024)

Doubles
- Career record: 93–72
- Career titles: 5 ITF
- Highest ranking: No. 312 (27 October 2025)
- Current ranking: No. 399 (4 May 2026)
- Last updated on: 1 May 2026.

Valentina Ryser (born 22 March 2001) is a Swiss tennis player. She has a career-high WTA singles ranking of world No. 213, achieved on 17 March 2025. She also has a career-high doubles ranking of No. 312, achieved on 27 October 2025.

== Career ==
Partnering Urszula Radwanska, Ryser won her first $50k tournament in April 2024 in Calvi, France.

== ITF Circuit finals ==
=== Singles: 18 (8 titles, 10 runner-ups) ===
Legend W100 tournaments W75 tournaments W50 tournaments W25/35 tournaments W15 tournaments	Finals by surface Hard (6–8) Clay (0–1) Carpet (2–1)

Result	W–L	Date	Tournament	Tier	Surface	Opponent	Score
Loss	0–1	Oct 2019	ITF Sharm El Sheikh, Egypt	W15	Hard	(Lithuania) Justina Mikulskytė	6–3, 4–6, 3–6
Loss	0–2	Feb 2020	ITF Manacor, Spain	W15	Hard	(Germany) Mina Hodzic	0–6, 3–6
Loss	0–3	Feb 2020	ITF Monastir, Tunisia	W15	Hard	(France) Carole Monnet	6–4, 1–6, 2–6
Win	1–3	May 2021	ITF Ramat HaSharon, Israel	W15	Hard	(Israel) Lina Glushko	7–5, 6–1
Loss	1–4	Sep 2021	ITF Dijon, France	W15	Clay	(Switzerland) Alina Granwehr	6–4, 2–6, 2–6
Loss	1–5	Feb 2022	ITF Monastir, Tunisia	W15	Hard	(Belarus) Kristina Dmitruk	2–6, 1–6
Win	2–5	Jul 2022	ITF Don Benito, Spain	W15	Carpet	(Romania) Karola Patricia Bejenaru	4–6, 6–2, 6–1
Loss	2–6	Dec 2022	ITF Lousada, Portugal	W15	Hard (i)	(Switzerland) Tess Sugnaux	1–6, 2–6
Win	3–6	Feb 2023	ITF Manacor, Spain	W15	Hard	(Portugal) Inês Murta	6–3, 6–3
Loss	3–7	Jun 2023	ITF Yecla, Spain	W25	Hard	(Philippines) Alex Eala	3–6, 5–7
Loss	3–8	Jul 2023	ITF Don Benito, Spain	W25	Carpet	(Austria) Tamira Paszek	6–7^{(7)}, 7–6^{(5)}, 6–7^{(3)}
Win	4–8	Oct 2023	ITF Sunderland, United Kingdom	W25	Hard (i)	(Estonia) Elena Malõgina	6–4, 7–5
Win	5–8	Jan 2024	ITF Sunderland, United Kingdom	W35	Hard (i)	(Czech Republic) Nikola Bartůňková	6–3, 7–6^{(6)}
Loss	5–9	Apr 2024	ITF Calvi, France	W50	Hard	(Ukraine) Daria Snigur	3–6, 2–6
Win	6–9	Jan 2025	ITF Glasgow, United Kingdom	W35	Hard (i)	(Czech Republic) Nikola Bartůňková	7–5, 7–6^{(4)}
Win	7–9	Mar 2025	Trnava Indoor, Slovakia	W75	Hard (i)	(Czech Republic) Tereza Valentová	6–4, 3–6, 7–6^{(4)}
Loss	7–10	May 2026	Takasaki Open, Japan	W100	Hard	(Japan) Yuki Naito	4–6, 3–6
Win	8–10	Jul 2026	ITF Don Benito, Spain	W35	Carpet	(Slovakia) Viktória Hrunčáková	6–4, 6–4

=== Doubles: 13 (6 titles, 7 runner-ups) ===
Legend W40/50 tournaments (1–0) W25/35 tournaments (2–2) W15 tournaments (3–5)	Finals by surface Hard (3–5) Clay (2–2) Carpet (1–0)

Result	W–L	Date	Tournament	Tier	Surface	Partner	Opponents	Score
Loss	0–1	Apr 2022	ITF Shymkent, Kazakhstan	W15	Clay	(Netherlands) Michaëlla Krajicek	(South Korea) Jeong Yeong-won (South Korea) Lee Eun-hye	walkover
Loss	0–2	Nov 2020	ITF Sharm El Sheikh, Egypt	W15	Hard	(Switzerland) Lulu Sun	(Russia) Ksenia Laskutova (Russia) Daria Mishina	6–7^{(3)}, 7–6^{(2)}, [10–12]
Loss	0–3	Nov 2020	ITF Sharm El Sheikh, Egypt	W15	Hard	(Switzerland) Lulu Sun	(Russia) Elina Avanesyan (Belarus) Iryna Shymanovich	4–6, 1–6
Loss	0–4	Jan 2021	ITF Manacor, Spain	W15	Hard	(Switzerland) Ylena In-Albon	(Spain) Ángela Fita Boluda (Russia) Oksana Selekhmeteva	1–6, 6–4, [5–10]
Loss	0–5	Jul 2021	ITF Monastir, Tunisia	W15	Hard	(United Kingdom) Emilie Lindh	(United States) Alana Smith (Switzerland) Dalayna Hewitt	4–6, 3–6
Win	1–5	Aug 2021	ITF Savitaipale, Finland	W15	Clay	(Switzerland) Marie Mettraux	(Germany) Emily Seibold (Russia) Anna Ureke	6–4, 7–5
Win	2–5	Jul 2022	ITF Don Benito, Spain	W15	Carpet	(United Kingdom) Emilie Lindh	(Austria) Tamara Kostic (Argentina) Lucia Peyre	7–6^{(5)}, 7–5
Win	3–5	Jul 2022	ITF Les Contamines-Montjoie, France	W15	Hard	(Switzerland) Naïma Karamoko	(France) Marine Szostak (France) Lucie Wargnier	6–7^{(5)}, 6–2, [10–8]
Win	4–5	Apr 2024	ITF Calvi, France	W50	Hard	(Poland) Urszula Radwańska	(United Kingdom) Sarah Beth Grey (France) Amandine Hesse	6–3, 6–2
Win	5–5	Apr 2024	ITF Nottingham, United Kingdom	W35	Hard	(Austria) Tamira Paszek	(Japan) Akiko Omae (Japan) Hikaru Sato	6–2, 5–7, [10–5]
Loss	5–6	May 2024	ITF Monzon, Spain	W35	Hard	(Austria) Tamira Paszek	(Brazil) Ana Candiotto (France) Tiphanie Lemaître	6–2, 0–6, [5–10]
Loss	5–7	Aug 2024	ITF Collonge-Bellerive, Switzerland	W35	Clay	(Switzerland) Karolina Kozakova	(Algeria) Inès Ibbou (Switzerland) Naïma Karamoko	6–7^{(0)}, 0–6
Win	6–7	May 2025	ITF Platja d'Aro, Spain	W35	Clay	(Switzerland) Jenny Dürst	(Spain) María Martínez Vaquero (Spain) Alba Rey García	6–4, 7–5
