= 2022 Empire Women's Indoor 2 =

Tennis tournament

- Date: 10–16 October 2022
- Edition: 10th
- Category: ITF Women's World Tennis Tour
- Prize money: $60,000
- Surface: Hard / Indoor
- Location: Trnava, Slovakia

Champions

Singles
- (Germany) Eva Lys

Doubles
- Sofya Lansere / (Slovakia) Rebecca Šramková
← 2020 ·	Empire Women's Indoor	· 2023 →

The 2022 Empire Women's Indoor 2 was a professional tennis tournament played on indoor hard courts. It was the tenth edition of the tournament which was part of the 2022 ITF Women's World Tennis Tour. It took place in Trnava, Slovakia between 10 and 16 October 2022.

== Champions ==
=== Singles ===
- (Germany) Eva Lys def. (Slovakia) Anna Karolína Schmiedlová, 6–2, 4–6, 6–2

=== Doubles ===
- Sofya Lansere / (Slovakia) Rebecca Šramková def. (Chinese Taipei) Lee Pei-chi / (Chinese Taipei) Wu Fang-hsien, 4–6, 6–2, [11–9]

== Singles main draw entrants ==
=== Seeds ===
Country	Player	Rank^{1}	Seed
CZE	Linda Nosková	97	1
SVK	Anna Karolína Schmiedlová	107	2
UKR	Daria Snigur	115	3
	Vitalia Diatchenko	116	4
~~GBR~~	~~Katie Swan~~	~~129~~	~~5~~
FRA	Léolia Jeanjean	133	6
USA	Caty McNally	151	7
GER	Eva Lys	168	8

- ^{1} Rankings are as of 3 October 2022.

=== Other entrants ===
The following players received wildcards into the singles main draw:

- (Slovakia) Nikola Daubnerová
- (Czech Republic) Lucie Havlíčková
- (Slovakia) Ela Pláteníková

The following player received entry into the singles main draw using a junior exempt:

- (Croatia) Petra Marčinko

The following players received entry from the qualifying draw:

- (Slovakia) Timea Jarušková
- (Czech Republic) Linda Klimovičová
- (Czech Republic) Aneta Laboutková
- (Chinese Taipei) Lee Pei-chi
- (Serbia) Lola Radivojević
- (Switzerland) Arlinda Rushiti
- (Slovakia) Rebecca Šramková
- (Germany) Stephanie Wagner

The following players received entry as Lucky Losers:

- (Germany) Mara Guth
- (Germany) Tayisiya Morderger
- (Germany) Yana Morderger
