= 2023 Empire Women's Indoor 2 =

Tennis tournament

- Date: 6–12 March 2023
- Edition: 14th
- Category: ITF Women's World Tennis Tour
- Prize money: $60,000
- Surface: Hard / Indoor
- Location: Trnava, Slovakia

Champions

Singles
- (Czech Republic) Lucie Havlíčková

Doubles
- (United Kingdom) Alicia Barnett / (United Kingdom) Olivia Nicholls
← 2022 ·	Empire Women's Indoor	· 2024 →

The 2023 Empire Women's Indoor 2 was a professional tennis tournament played on indoor hard courts. It was the fourteenth edition of the tournament, which was part of the 2023 ITF Women's World Tennis Tour. It took place in Trnava, Slovakia, between 6 and 12 March 2023.

== Champions ==
=== Singles ===
- (Czech Republic) Lucie Havlíčková def. (France) Océane Dodin, 3–6, 7–6^{(7–4)}, 7–5

=== Doubles ===
- (United Kingdom) Alicia Barnett / (United Kingdom) Olivia Nicholls def. Amina Anshba / (Czech Republic) Anastasia Dețiuc, 6–3, 6–3

== Singles main draw entrants ==
=== Seeds ===
Country	Player	Rank	Seed
BUL	Viktoriya Tomova	87	1
AUT	Julia Grabher	91	2
FRA	Océane Dodin	101	3
UKR	Daria Snigur	157	4
FRA	Elsa Jacquemot	158	5
ESP	Leyre Romero Gormaz	169	6
ESP	Jéssica Bouzas Maneiro	181	7
BEL	Greet Minnen	192	8

- Rankings are as of 27 February 2023.

=== Other entrants ===
The following players received wildcards into the singles main draw:

- (Slovakia) Renáta Jamrichová
- (Slovakia) Natália Kročková
- (Slovakia) Ela Pláteníková
- (Czech Republic) Amélie Šmejkalová

The following players received entry from the qualifying draw:

- (Croatia) Lea Bošković
- (Czech Republic) Lucie Havlíčková
- (Estonia) Elena Malõgina
- (Serbia) Lola Radivojević
- (Czech Republic) Dominika Šalková
- (Czech Republic) Tereza Smitková
- (Liechtenstein) Kathinka von Deichmann
- (Slovakia) Radka Zelníčková
