= 2023 Empire Women's Indoor 1 =

Tennis tournament

- Date: 27 February–5 March 2023
- Edition: 13th
- Category: ITF Women's World Tennis Tour
- Prize money: $60,000
- Surface: Hard / Indoor
- Location: Trnava, Slovakia

Champions

Singles
- (Romania) Jaqueline Cristian

Doubles
- (Belgium) Greet Minnen / (Belgium) Yanina Wickmayer
| ← 2022 · | Empire Women's Indoor | · 2024 → |

The 2023 Empire Women's Indoor 1 was a professional tennis tournament played on indoor hard courts. It was the thirteenth edition of the tournament, which was part of the 2023 ITF Women's World Tennis Tour. It took place in Trnava, Slovakia, between 27 February and 5 March 2023.

== Champions ==
=== Singles ===
- (Romania) Jaqueline Cristian def. (France) Océane Dodin, 7–6^{(9–7)}, 7–6^{(7–4)}

=== Doubles ===
- (Belgium) Greet Minnen / (Belgium) Yanina Wickmayer def. (Greece) Sapfo Sakellaridi / (Slovakia) Radka Zelníčková, 6–4, 6–4

== Singles main draw entrants ==
=== Seeds ===
| Country | Player | Rank | Seed |
|---|---|---|---|
| GER | Tamara Korpatsch | 82 | 1 |
| AUT | Julia Grabher | 94 | 2 |
| FRA | Océane Dodin | 101 | 3 |
| DEN | Clara Tauson | 113 | 4 |
| HUN | Réka Luca Jani | 118 | 5 |
| SLO | Tamara Zidanšek | 119 | 6 |
| BEL | Greet Minnen | 171 | 7 |
| ESP | Leyre Romero Gormaz | 172 | 8 |

- Rankings are as of 20 February 2023.

=== Other entrants ===
The following players received wildcards into the singles main draw:

- (Slovakia) Natália Kročková
- (Slovakia) Kristína Kučová
- (Slovakia) Ela Pláteníková
- (Slovakia) Rebecca Šramková

The following player received entry into the singles main draw using a junior exempt:

- (Switzerland) Céline Naef

The following players received entry from the qualifying draw:

- (Romania) Ilona Georgiana Ghioroaie
- (Czech Republic) Lucie Havlíčková
- (Estonia) Elena Malõgina
- (Czech Republic) Dominika Šalková
- (Czech Republic) Anna Sisková
- (Czech Republic) Tereza Smitková
- (Hungary) Amarissa Kiara Tóth
- (Slovakia) Radka Zelníčková
