= 2023 Empire Women's Indoor 3 – Singles =

Singles
- 2023 Empire Women's Indoor 3

Final
- Champion: (Australia) Arina Rodionova
- Runner-up: (France) Kristina Mladenovic
- Score: 7–6^{(7–1)}, 5–7, 6–1

Events
Singles	Doubles
← 2023 ·	Empire Women's Indoor	· 2024 →

Vera Lapko was the reigning champion but chose not to participate.

Arina Rodionova won the title, defeating Kristina Mladenovic in the final, 7–6^{(7–1)}, 5–7, 6–1.

== Seeds ==
1. (Ukraine) Daria Snigur (first round)
2. (Australia) Arina Rodionova (champion)
3. (Croatia) Tena Lukas (second round)
4. Yuliya Hatouka (semifinals)
5. (Bulgaria) Gergana Topalova (first round)
6. (Uzbekistan) Nigina Abduraimova (quarterfinals)
7. (France) Kristina Mladenovic (final)
8. (Germany) Mona Barthel (semifinals)

== Draw ==
=== Key ===
- Q = Qualifier
- WC = Wild card
- LL = Lucky loser
- Alt = Alternate
- ITF = ITF entry
- PR = Protected ranking
- SR = Special ranking
- SE = Special exempt
- JE = Junior exempt
- JR = Junior Accelerator Programme entrant
- CO = College Accelerator Programme entrant
- NG = Next Gen Accelerator Program entrant
- w/o = Walkover
- r = Retired
- d = Defaulted

=== Finals ===
Semifinals
8	(Germany) Mona Barthel	4	4
7	(France) Kristina Mladenovic	6	6
4	Yuliya Hatouka	6	0	6^{10}
2	(Australia) Arina Rodionova	3	6	7^{12}

Final
7	(France) Kristina Mladenovic	6^{1}	7	1
2	(Australia) Arina Rodionova	7^{7}	5	6

=== Top half ===
First round
1	(Ukraine) D Snigur	4	0
(Ukraine) K Volodko	6	6
(Romania) A Cadanțu-Ignatik	6	6
WC	(Slovakia) S Šarinová	2	3
Q	(United Kingdom) SB Grey	6	6
(Lithuania) J Mikulskytė	3	4
WC	(Slovakia) N Kročková	1	4
8	(Germany) M Barthel	6	6
3	(Croatia) T Lukas	6	6
Q	(Czech Republic) T Smitková	3	3
(Malta) F Curmi	5	6	6
Q	K Pavlova	7	4	4
LL	(Germany) T Morderger	6	2	4
(Switzerland) N Keller	4	6	6
(Ukraine) A Soboleva	4	6	3
7	(France) K Mladenovic	6	2	6

Second round
(Ukraine) K Volodko	6	6
(Romania) A Cadanțu-Ignatik	0	3
Q	(United Kingdom) SB Grey	2	6	2
8	(Germany) M Barthel	6	4	6
3	(Croatia) T Lukas	2	4
(Malta) F Curmi	6	6
(Switzerland) N Keller	0	6^{4}
7	(France) K Mladenovic	6	7^{7}

Quarterfinals
(Ukraine) K Volodko
8	(Germany) M Barthel	w/o
(Malta) F Curmi	6^{4}	4
7	(France) K Mladenovic	7^{7}	6

Semifinals
8	(Germany) M Barthel	4	4
7	(France) K Mladenovic	6	6

=== Bottom half ===
First round
5	(Bulgaria) G Topalova	5	1
Q	(Serbia) E Milovanović	7	6
(Romania) A Mitu	6	4	6
WC	(Slovakia) R Jamrichová	3	6	4
Q	(Germany) S Wagner	6	6
WC	(Czech Republic) V Valdmannová	1	0
(France) A Hesse	5	3
4	Y Hatouka	7	6
6	(Uzbekistan) N Abduraimova	6^{6}	6	2
Q	(Czech Republic) J Malečková	7^{8}	2	1^{r}
(Romania) IG Ghioroaie	6^{7}	5
(Czech Republic) A Kučmová	7^{9}	7
(Croatia) A Ružić	4	0
SR	(Georgia (country)) M Bolkvadze	6	6
Q	A Ibragimova	3	6	4
2	(Australia) A Rodionova	6	4	6

Second round
Q	(Serbia) E Milovanović	6	6
(Romania) A Mitu	2	3
Q	(Germany) S Wagner	3	3
4	Y Hatouka	6	6
6	(Uzbekistan) N Abduraimova	6	3	7
(Czech Republic) A Kučmová	0	6	5
SR	(Georgia (country)) M Bolkvadze	2	6	2
2	(Australia) A Rodionova	6	3	6

Quarterfinals
Q	(Serbia) E Milovanović	4	3
4	Y Hatouka	6	6
6	(Uzbekistan) N Abduraimova	7	4	4
2	(Australia) A Rodionova	5	6	6

Semifinals
4	Y Hatouka	6	0	6^{10}
2	(Australia) A Rodionova	3	6	7^{12}
