= 2022 Empire Women's Indoor 1 =

Tennis tournament

- Date: 3–9 October 2022
- Edition: 9th
- Category: ITF Women's World Tennis Tour
- Prize money: $60,000
- Surface: Hard / Indoor
- Location: Trnava, Slovakia

Champions

Singles
- (United Kingdom) Katie Swan

Doubles
- (Georgia (country)) Mariam Bolkvadze / (United Kingdom) Maia Lumsden
| ← 2020 · | Empire Women's Indoor | · 2023 → |

The 2022 Empire Women's Indoor 1 was a professional tennis tournament played on indoor hard courts. It was the ninth edition of the tournament which was part of the 2022 ITF Women's World Tennis Tour. It took place in Trnava, Slovakia between 3 and 9 October 2022.

== Champions ==
=== Singles ===
- (United Kingdom) Katie Swan def. (China) Wang Xinyu, 6–1, 3–6, 6–4

=== Doubles ===
- (Georgia (country)) Mariam Bolkvadze / (United Kingdom) Maia Lumsden def. (Latvia) Diāna Marcinkēviča / (Switzerland) Conny Perrin, 6–2, 6–3

== Singles main draw entrants ==
=== Seeds ===
| Country | Player | Rank^{1} | Seed |
|---|---|---|---|
| CHN | Wang Xinyu | 87 | 1 |
| | Vitalia Diatchenko | 115 | 2 |
| GBR | Katie Swan | 131 | 3 |
| GEO | Ekaterine Gorgodze | 162 | 4 |
| GER | Eva Lys | 172 | 5 |
| AUT | Sinja Kraus | 199 | 6 |
| GRE | Valentini Grammatikopoulou | 200 | 7 |
| GBR | Sonay Kartal | 210 | 8 |

- ^{1} Rankings are as of 26 September 2022.

=== Other entrants ===
The following players received wildcards into the singles main draw:

- Alisa Oktiabreva
- (Slovakia) Ela Pláteníková
- (Slovakia) Rebecca Šramková
- (Slovakia) Radka Zelníčková

The following player received entry into the singles main draw using a protected ranking:

- (United Kingdom) Maia Lumsden

The following player received entry into the singles main draw using a junior exempt:

- (Croatia) Petra Marčinko

The following players received entry from the qualifying draw:

- (Germany) Mona Barthel
- (United Kingdom) Freya Christie
- (Slovakia) Renáta Jamrichová
- (Germany) Kathleen Kanev
- Vera Lapko
- (Slovakia) Sofia Milatová
- (Serbia) Lola Radivojević
- (Switzerland) Arlinda Rushiti
