= 2023 Empire Women's Indoor 1 – Doubles =

Doubles
- 2023 Empire Women's Indoor 1

Final
- Champions: (Belgium) Greet Minnen (Belgium) Yanina Wickmayer
- Runners-up: (Greece) Sapfo Sakellaridi (Slovakia) Radka Zelníčková
- Score: 6–4, 6–4

Events
| Singles | Doubles |
| ← 2022 · | Empire Women's Indoor | · 2024 → |

Mariam Bolkvadze and Maia Lumsden were the defending champions but chose not to participate.

Greet Minnen and Yanina Wickmayer won the title, defeating Sapfo Sakellaridi and Radka Zelníčková in the final, 6–4, 6–4.

== Seeds ==
1. (Belgium) Greet Minnen / (Belgium) Yanina Wickmayer (champions)
2. (Germany) Vivian Heisen / (Germany) Julia Lohoff (first round)
3. Amina Anshba / (Czech Republic) Anna Sisková (first round)
4. (Spain) Jéssica Bouzas Maneiro / (Spain) Leyre Romero Gormaz (quarterfinals)

== Draw ==
=== Key ===
- Q = Qualifier
- WC = Wild card
- LL = Lucky loser
- Alt = Alternate
- SE = Special exempt
- PR = Protected ranking
- ITF = ITF entry
- JE = Junior exempt
- w/o = Walkover
- r = Retired
- d = Defaulted
- SR = Special ranking

First round
1 | (Belgium) G Minnen (Belgium) Y Wickmayer | 6 | 2 | [10]
(Romania) IG Ghioroaie (Hungary) AK Tóth | 1 | 6 | [4]
WC | (Slovakia) E Pláteníková (Slovakia) N Vargová | 7 | 6
WC | (United States) B Olson (Ukraine) A Tkachenko | 5 | 3
3 | A Anshba (Czech Republic) A Sisková | 3 | 3
(Estonia) E Malõgina (United Kingdom) E Webley-Smith | 6 | 6
(Czech Republic) D Šalková (Hungary) N Szabanin | 6 | 1 | [10]
(Poland) W Falkowska (Czech Republic) B Palicová | 2 | 6 | [4]
(Romania) C Dinu (Slovenia) N Radišić | 7 | 6
(Slovakia) N Daubnerová (Czech Republic) L Havlíčková | 5 | 4
(Netherlands) L Pattinama Kerkhove (Liechtenstein) K von Deichmann | 2 | 6 | [5]
4 | (Spain) J Bouzas Maneiro (Spain) L Romero Gormaz | 6 | 3 | [10]
WC | (Slovakia) N Kročková (Slovakia) K Kučová | 4 | 3
(Greece) S Sakellaridi (Slovakia) R Zelníčková | 6 | 6
(Germany) T Morderger (Germany) Y Morderger | 6 | 2 | [10]
2 | (Germany) V Heisen (Germany) J Lohoff | 3 | 6 | [7]

Quarterfinals
1 | (Belgium) G Minnen (Belgium) Y Wickmayer | 6 | 6
WC | (Slovakia) E Pláteníková (Slovakia) N Vargová | 0 | 1
(Estonia) E Malõgina (United Kingdom) E Webley-Smith | 5 | 4
(Czech Republic) D Šalková (Hungary) N Szabanin | 7 | 6
(Romania) C Dinu (Slovenia) N Radišić | 7 | 6
4 | (Spain) J Bouzas Maneiro (Spain) L Romero Gormaz | 5 | 4
(Greece) S Sakellaridi (Slovakia) R Zelníčková | 6 | 6
(Germany) T Morderger (Germany) Y Morderger | 2 | 4

Semifinals
1 | (Belgium) G Minnen (Belgium) Y Wickmayer | 7 | 6
(Czech Republic) D Šalková (Hungary) N Szabanin | 5 | 3
(Romania) C Dinu (Slovenia) N Radišić | 2 | 6^{3}
(Greece) S Sakellaridi (Slovakia) R Zelníčková | 6 | 7^{7}

Final
1 | (Belgium) G Minnen (Belgium) Y Wickmayer | 6 | 6
(Greece) S Sakellaridi (Slovakia) R Zelníčková | 4 | 4
