= 2024 Empire Women's Indoor 2 =

Tennis tournament

- Date: 4–10 March 2024
- Edition: 17th
- Category: ITF Women's World Tennis Tour
- Prize money: $60,000
- Surface: Hard / Indoor
- Location: Trnava, Slovakia

Champions

Singles
- (Netherlands) Suzan Lamens

Doubles
- (Netherlands) Isabelle Haverlag / (United States) Anna Rogers
← 2023 ·	Empire Women's Indoor	· 2025 →

The 2024 Empire Women's Indoor 2 was a professional tennis tournament played on indoor hard courts. It was the seventeenth edition of the tournament, which was part of the 2024 ITF Women's World Tennis Tour. It took place in Trnava, Slovakia, between 4 and 10 March 2024.

== Champions ==
=== Singles ===
- (Netherlands) Suzan Lamens def. (Switzerland) Céline Naef, 6–2, 6–2

=== Doubles ===
- (Netherlands) Isabelle Haverlag / (United States) Anna Rogers def. (Chinese Taipei) Liang En-shuo / (China) Tang Qianhui, 6–3, 4–6, [12–10]

== Singles main draw entrants ==
=== Seeds ===
Country	Player	Rank	Seed
HUN	Anna Bondár	111	1
SLO	Tamara Zidanšek	114	2
FRA	Léolia Jeanjean	140	3
FRA	Fiona Ferro	141	4
~~GER~~	~~Eva Lys~~	~~144~~	~~5~~
JPN	Moyuka Uchijima	149	6
CZE	Tereza Martincová	155	7
ROU	Elena-Gabriela Ruse	156	8

- Rankings are as of 26 February 2024.

=== Other entrants ===
The following players received wildcards into the singles main draw:

- (Slovakia) Renáta Jamrichová
- (France) Kristina Mladenovic
- (Slovakia) Sára Šarinová
- (Czech Republic) Amélie Šmejkalová

The following players received entry from the qualifying draw:

- (Philippines) Alex Eala
- (Slovenia) Veronika Erjavec
- (Czech Republic) Lucie Havlíčková
- (Portugal) Francisca Jorge
- (Netherlands) Suzan Lamens
- Tatiana Prozorova
- (Croatia) Antonia Ružić
- Anastasia Tikhonova

The following player received entry as a lucky loser:

- (Switzerland) Valentina Ryser
