= 2023 Empire Women's Indoor 1 – Singles =

Singles
- 2023 Empire Women's Indoor 1

Final
- Champion: (Romania) Jaqueline Cristian
- Runner-up: (France) Océane Dodin
- Score: 7–6^{(9–7)}, 7–6^{(7–4)}

Events
Singles	Doubles
← 2022 ·	Empire Women's Indoor	· 2024 →

Katie Swan was the defending champion but chose not to participate.

Jaqueline Cristian won the title, defeating Océane Dodin in the final, 7–6^{(9–7)}, 7–6^{(7–4)}.

== Seeds ==
1. (Germany) Tamara Korpatsch (first round)
2. (Austria) Julia Grabher (first round)
3. (France) Océane Dodin (final)
4. (Denmark) Clara Tauson (second round)
5. (Hungary) Réka Luca Jani (first round)
6. (Slovenia) Tamara Zidanšek (quarterfinals)
7. (Belgium) Greet Minnen (semifinals)
8. (Spain) Leyre Romero Gormaz (second round)

== Draw ==
=== Key ===
- Q = Qualifier
- WC = Wild card
- LL = Lucky loser
- Alt = Alternate
- SE = Special exempt
- PR = Protected ranking
- ITF = ITF entry
- JE = Junior exempt
- w/o = Walkover
- r = Retired
- d = Defaulted
- SR = Special ranking

=== Finals ===
Semifinals
7	(Belgium) Greet Minnen	5	3
3	(France) Océane Dodin	7	6
(Romania) Jaqueline Cristian	6	6
WC	(Slovakia) Kristína Kučová	3	4

Final
3	(France) Océane Dodin	6^{7}	6^{4}
(Romania) Jaqueline Cristian	7^{9}	7^{7}

=== Top half ===
First round
1	(Germany) T Korpatsch	3	3
(Poland) W Falkowska	6	6
(Hungary) N Szabanin	2	3
(Czech Republic) B Palicová	6	6
Q	(Czech Republic) D Šalková	7^{7}	4	6
(Germany) M Barthel	6^{4}	6	3
Q	(Czech Republic) A Sisková	4	1
7	(Belgium) G Minnen	6	6
3	(France) O Dodin	7^{7}	6
Q	(Slovakia) R Zelníčková	6^{4}	1
JE	(Switzerland) C Naef	6	6
(Slovenia) N Potočnik	3	3
Q	(Romania) IG Ghioroaie	4	7^{7}	2
WC	(Slovakia) R Šramková	6	6^{3}	6
(Belgium) Y Wickmayer	6	6
5	(Hungary) RL Jani	2	1

Second round
(Poland) W Falkowska	3	2
(Czech Republic) B Palicová	6	6
Q	(Czech Republic) D Šalková	2	1
7	(Belgium) G Minnen	6	6
3	(France) O Dodin	6	4	6
JE	(Switzerland) C Naef	1	6	3
WC	(Slovakia) R Šramková	2	4
(Belgium) Y Wickmayer	6	6

Quarterfinals
(Czech Republic) B Palicová	3	3
7	(Belgium) G Minnen	6	6
3	(France) O Dodin	4	6	7^{7}
(Belgium) Y Wickmayer	6	1	6^{3}

Semifinals
7	(Belgium) G Minnen	5	3
3	(France) O Dodin	7	6

=== Bottom half ===
First round
6	(Slovenia) T Zidanšek	6	6
Q	(Hungary) AK Tóth	4	3
(Liechtenstein) K von Deichmann	6	6
WC	(Slovakia) E Pláteníková	1	1
Q	(Estonia) E Malõgina	3	4
(Romania) J Cristian	6	6
(Netherlands) L Pattinama Kerkhove	0	2
4	(Denmark) C Tauson	6	6
8	(Spain) L Romero Gormaz	6	6
WC	(Slovakia) N Kročková	3	3
Q	(Czech Republic) T Smitková	6	6
(Poland) K Kawa	0	1
(Spain) J Bouzas Maneiro	4	4
Q	(Czech Republic) L Havlíčková	6	6
WC	(Slovakia) K Kučová	6	2	6
2	(Austria) J Grabher	1	6	3

Second round
6	(Slovenia) T Zidanšek	6	6
(Liechtenstein) K von Deichmann	3	4
(Romania) J Cristian	6^{9}	7	6
4	(Denmark) C Tauson	7^{11}	5	0
8	(Spain) L Romero Gormaz	6^{2}	4
Q	(Czech Republic) T Smitková	7^{7}	6
Q	(Czech Republic) L Havlíčková	4	6^{4}
WC	(Slovakia) K Kučová	6	7^{7}

Quarterfinals
6	(Slovenia) T Zidanšek	5	6	2
(Romania) J Cristian	7	1	6
Q	(Czech Republic) T Smitková	4	6	4
WC	(Slovakia) K Kučová	6	4	6

Semifinals
(Romania) J Cristian	6	6
WC	(Slovakia) K Kučová	3	4
