= 2023 Empire Women's Indoor 2 – Singles =

Singles
- 2023 Empire Women's Indoor 2

Final
- Champion: (Czech Republic) Lucie Havlíčková
- Runner-up: (France) Océane Dodin
- Score: 3–6, 7–6^{(7–4)}, 7–5

Events
Singles	Doubles
← 2022 ·	Empire Women's Indoor	· 2024 →

Eva Lys was the defending champion but chose not to participate.

Lucie Havlíčková won the title, defeating Océane Dodin in the final, 3–6, 7–6^{(7–4)}, 7–5.

== Seeds ==
1. (Bulgaria) Viktoriya Tomova (quarterfinals)
2. (Austria) Julia Grabher (second round)
3. (France) Océane Dodin (final)
4. (Ukraine) Daria Snigur (semifinals)
5. (France) Elsa Jacquemot (first round)
6. (Spain) Leyre Romero Gormaz (first round)
7. (Spain) Jéssica Bouzas Maneiro (second round, retired)
8. (Belgium) Greet Minnen (semifinals)

== Draw ==
=== Key ===
- Q = Qualifier
- WC = Wild card
- LL = Lucky loser
- Alt = Alternate
- SE = Special exempt
- PR = Protected ranking
- ITF = ITF entry
- JE = Junior exempt
- w/o = Walkover
- r = Retired
- d = Defaulted
- SR = Special ranking

=== Finals ===
Semifinals
8	(Belgium) Greet Minnen	2	3
3	(France) Océane Dodin	6	6
4	(Ukraine) Daria Snigur	6^{7}	1
Q	(Czech Republic) Lucie Havlíčková	7^{9}	6

Final
3	(France) Océane Dodin	6	6^{4}	5
Q	(Czech Republic) Lucie Havlíčková	3	7^{7}	7

=== Top half ===
First round
1	(Bulgaria) V Tomova	6	6
(Poland) K Kawa	0	2
Q	(Croatia) L Bošković	4	6	6
(Poland) W Falkowska	6	3	2
(Croatia) J Fett	6^{8}	0
Q	(Czech Republic) D Šalková	7^{10}	6
K Dmitruk	6^{5}	1
8	(Belgium) G Minnen	7^{7}	6
3	(France) O Dodin	6	6
(Poland) M Chwalińska	2	1
(Slovenia) N Potočnik	2	2
(Germany) M Barthel	6	6
(Netherlands) L Pattinama Kerkhove	1	2
(Czech Republic) B Palicová	6	6
WC	(Slovakia) E Pláteníková	0	2
7	(Spain) J Bouzas Maneiro	6	6

Second round
1	(Bulgaria) V Tomova	7^{7}	4	6
Q	(Croatia) L Bošković	6^{5}	6	3
Q	(Czech Republic) D Šalková	2	1
8	(Belgium) G Minnen	6	6
3	(France) O Dodin	5	6	6
(Germany) M Barthel	7	3	2
(Czech Republic) B Palicová	7	0
7	(Spain) J Bouzas Maneiro	5	0^{r}

Quarterfinals
1	(Bulgaria) V Tomova	5	1
8	(Belgium) G Minnen	7	6
3	(France) O Dodin	7^{7}	6
(Czech Republic) B Palicová	6^{1}	0

Semifinals
8	(Belgium) G Minnen	2	3
3	(France) O Dodin	6	6

=== Bottom half ===
First round
6	(Spain) L Romero Gormaz	1	0
(Philippines) A Eala	6	6
WC	(Slovakia) N Kročková	4	3
(United Kingdom) S Kartal	6	6
Q	(Estonia) E Malõgina	5	1
Q	(Serbia) L Radivojević	7	6
WC	(Slovakia) R Jamrichová	5	3
4	(Ukraine) D Snigur	7	6
5	(France) E Jacquemot	3	2
Q	(Czech Republic) T Smitková	6	6
Q	(Liechtenstein) K von Deichmann	4	2
Q	(Czech Republic) L Havlíčková	6	6
(Latvia) D Semeņistaja	6^{6}	6	5
Q	(Slovakia) R Zelníčková	7^{8}	4	7
WC	(Czech Republic) A Šmejkalová	0	3
2	(Austria) J Grabher	6	6

Second round
(Philippines) A Eala	2	2
(United Kingdom) S Kartal	6	6
Q	(Serbia) L Radivojević	2	1
4	(Ukraine) D Snigur	6	6
Q	(Czech Republic) T Smitková	3	4
Q	(Czech Republic) L Havlíčková	6	6
Q	(Slovakia) R Zelníčková	6	6
2	(Austria) J Grabher	4	0

Quarterfinals
(United Kingdom) S Kartal	6^{4}	3
4	(Ukraine) D Snigur	7^{7}	6
Q	(Czech Republic) L Havlíčková	6	5	6
Q	(Slovakia) R Zelníčková	3	7	3

Semifinals
4	(Ukraine) D Snigur	6^{7}	1
Q	(Czech Republic) L Havlíčková	7^{9}	6
