= 2024 Empire Women's Indoor 2 – Singles =

Singles
- 2024 Empire Women's Indoor 2

Final
- Champion: (Netherlands) Suzan Lamens
- Runner-up: (Switzerland) Céline Naef
- Score: 6–2, 6–2

Events
Singles	Doubles
← 2023 ·	Empire Women's Indoor	· 2025 →

Lucie Havlíčková was the defending champion but lost in the second round to Suzan Lamens.

Lamens went on to win the title, defeating Céline Naef in the final, 6–2, 6–2.

== Seeds ==
1. (Hungary) Anna Bondár (second round)
2. (Slovenia) Tamara Zidanšek (first round)
3. (France) Léolia Jeanjean (first round)
4. (France) Fiona Ferro (first round)
5. (Germany) Eva Lys (withdrew)
6. (Japan) Moyuka Uchijima (first round)
7. (Czech Republic) Tereza Martincová (second round)
8. (Romania) Elena-Gabriela Ruse (quarterfinals)

== Draw ==
Key

- Q = Qualifier
- WC = Wild card
- LL = Lucky loser
- Alt = Alternate
- ITF = ITF entry
- PR = Protected ranking
- SR = Special ranking
- SE = Special exempt
- JE = Junior exempt
- JR = Junior Accelerator Programme entrant
- CO = College Accelerator Programme entrant
- NG = Next Gen Accelerator Program entrant
- w/o = Walkover
- r = Retired
- d = Defaulted

=== Finals ===
Semifinals
Q	Anastasia Tikhonova	4	7^{7}	4
Q	(Netherlands) Suzan Lamens	6	6^{4}	6
(Switzerland) Céline Naef	6	4	6
(Croatia) Jana Fett	2	6	2

Final
Q	(Netherlands) Suzan Lamens	6	6
(Switzerland) Céline Naef	2	2

=== Top half ===
First round
1	(Hungary) A Bondár	6	7
(Australia) K Birrell	2	5
(Austria) S Kraus	2	1
Q	A Tikhonova	6	6
(United Kingdom) L Miyazaki	6	6
Q	(Slovenia) V Erjavec	3	3
Q	(Croatia) A Ružić	6	6
LL	(Switzerland) V Ryser	2	4
4	(France) F Ferro	5	3
P Kudermetova	7	6
(Turkey) Z Sönmez	6	6
(Italy) L Stefanini	4	2
Q	(Czech Republic) L Havlíčková	6	6
Q	(Portugal) F Jorge	2	3
Q	(Netherlands) S Lamens	6	6
6	(Japan) M Uchijima	4	3

Second round
1	(Hungary) A Bondár	3	1
Q	A Tikhonova	6	6
(United Kingdom) L Miyazaki	7^{7}	6
Q	(Croatia) A Ružić	6^{4}	4
P Kudermetova	4	2
(Turkey) Z Sönmez	6	6
Q	(Czech Republic) L Havlíčková	7^{7}	5	2
Q	(Netherlands) S Lamens	6^{2}	7	6

Quarterfinals
Q	A Tikhonova	6	6
(United Kingdom) L Miyazaki	1	1
(Turkey) Z Sönmez	3	6	4
Q	(Netherlands) S Lamens	6	3	6

Semifinals
Q	A Tikhonova	4	7^{7}	4
Q	(Netherlands) S Lamens	6	6^{4}	6

=== Bottom half ===
First round
7	(Czech Republic) T Martincová	3	6	7^{7}
Q	(Philippines) A Eala	6	4	6^{3}
(Switzerland) C Naef	6	6
Q	T Prozorova	4	1
WC	(Czech Republic) A Šmejkalová	2	1
(Hungary) P Udvardy	6	6
(Japan) H Sakatsume	6^{3}	6	6
3	(France) L Jeanjean	7^{7}	1	2
8	(Romania) E-G Ruse	6	7^{7}
V Savinykh	1	6^{4}
(Ukraine) K Zavatska	6	2	1
WC	(Slovakia) R Jamrichová	4	6	6
(Croatia) J Fett	6	6
WC	(Slovakia) S Šarinová	1	0
WC	(France) K Mladenovic	7^{7}	7^{7}
2	(Slovenia) T Zidanšek	6^{2}	6^{2}

Second round
7	(Czech Republic) T Martincová	3	3
(Switzerland) C Naef	6	6
(Hungary) P Udvardy	3	3
(Japan) H Sakatsume	6	6
8	(Romania) E-G Ruse	7	6
WC	(Slovakia) R Jamrichová	5	4
(Croatia) J Fett	6	6
WC	(France) K Mladenovic	3	3

Quarterfinals
(Switzerland) C Naef	6	6
(Japan) H Sakatsume	1	2
8	(Romania) E-G Ruse	2	6^{11}
(Croatia) J Fett	6	7^{13}

Semifinals
(Switzerland) C Naef	6	4	6
(Croatia) J Fett	2	6	2
