= 2022 Empire Women's Indoor 2 – Singles =

Singles
- 2022 Empire Women's Indoor 2

Final
- Champion: (Germany) Eva Lys
- Runner-up: (Slovakia) Anna Karolína Schmiedlová
- Score: 6–2, 4–6, 6–2

Events
| Singles | Doubles |
| ← 2021 · | Empire Women's Indoor | · 2023 → |

Jaqueline Cristian was the defending champion but chose not to participate.

Eva Lys won the title, defeating Anna Karolína Schmiedlová in the final, 6–2, 4–6, 6–2.

== Seeds ==
1. (Czech Republic) Linda Nosková (quarterfinals)
2. (Slovakia) Anna Karolína Schmiedlová (final)
3. (Ukraine) Daria Snigur (first round)
4. Vitalia Diatchenko (quarterfinals)
5. (United Kingdom) Katie Swan (withdrew)
6. (France) Léolia Jeanjean (second round)
7. (United States) Caty McNally (semifinals)
8. (Germany) Eva Lys (champion)

== Draw ==
=== Key ===
- Q = Qualifier
- WC = Wild card
- LL = Lucky loser
- Alt = Alternate
- SE = Special exempt
- PR = Protected ranking
- ITF = ITF entry
- JE = Junior exempt
- w/o = Walkover
- r = Retired
- d = Defaulted
- SR = Special ranking

=== Finals ===
Semifinals
7 | (United States) Caty McNally | 1 | 4
8 | (Germany) Eva Lys | 6 | 6
WC | (Czech Republic) Lucie Havlíčková | 3 | 3
2 | (Slovakia) Anna Karolína Schmiedlová | 6 | 6

Final
8 | (Germany) Eva Lys | 6 | 4 | 6
2 | (Slovakia) Anna Karolína Schmiedlová | 2 | 6 | 2

=== Top half ===
First round
1 | (Czech Republic) L Nosková | 6 | 6
WC | (Slovakia) E Pláteníková | 2 | 1
LL | (Germany) T Morderger | 4 | 4
(Czech Republic) J Malečková | 6 | 6
JE | (Croatia) P Marčinko | 6 | 3
(Georgia (country)) M Bolkvadze | 3 | 0^{r}
Q | (Chinese Taipei) P-c Lee | 0 | 0
7 | (United States) C McNally | 6 | 6
3 | (Ukraine) D Snigur | 4 | 2
(United Kingdom) S Kartal | 6 | 6
A Tikhonova | 6 | 7^{7}
Q | (Serbia) L Radivojević | 1 | 6^{5}
LL | (Germany) M Guth | 3 | 1
(Chinese Taipei) J Garland | 6 | 6
Q | (Switzerland) A Rushiti | 0 | 6^{3}
8 | (Germany) E Lys | 6 | 7^{7}

Second round
1 | (Czech Republic) L Nosková | 6 | 6
(Czech Republic) J Malečková | 3 | 4
JE | (Croatia) P Marčinko | 6^{7} | 1
7 | (United States) C McNally | 7^{9} | 6
(United Kingdom) S Kartal | 0^{r}
A Tikhonova | 4
(Chinese Taipei) J Garland | 4 | 6^{2}
8 | (Germany) E Lys | 6 | 7^{7}

Quarterfinals
1 | (Czech Republic) L Nosková | 6 | 1 | 4
7 | (United States) C McNally | 3 | 6 | 6
A Tikhonova | 6^{4} | 3
8 | (Germany) E Lys | 7^{7} | 6

Semifinals
7 | (United States) C McNally | 1 | 4
8 | (Germany) E Lys | 6 | 6

=== Bottom half ===
First round
LL | (Germany) Y Morderger | 0 | 3
WC | (Czech Republic) L Havlíčková | 6 | 6
Q | (Germany) S Wagner | 6 | 2 | 4
A Kubareva | 3 | 6 | 6
(Greece) V Grammatikopoulou | 6 | 7^{7}
(Germany) M Barthel | 4 | 6^{1}
Q | (Czech Republic) L Klimovičová | 1 | 3
4 | V Diatchenko | 6 | 6
6 | (France) L Jeanjean | 6 | 6^{7} | 7
WC | (Slovakia) N Daubnerová | 2 | 7^{9} | 5
Q | (Czech Republic) A Laboutková | 2 | 3
Q | (Slovakia) R Šramková | 6 | 6
(Denmark) S Samavati | 4 | 1
S Lansere | 6 | 6
Q | (Slovakia) T Jarušková | 2 | 1
2 | (Slovakia) AK Schmiedlová | 6 | 6

Second round
WC | (Czech Republic) L Havlíčková | 6 | 6
A Kubareva | 3 | 2
(Greece) V Grammatikopoulou | 4 | 4
4 | V Diatchenko | 6 | 6
6 | (France) L Jeanjean | 6^{5} | 2
Q | (Slovakia) R Šramková | 7^{7} | 6
S Lansere | 3 | 2
2 | (Slovakia) AK Schmiedlová | 6 | 6

Quarterfinals
WC | (Czech Republic) L Havlíčková | 7^{7} | 6
4 | V Diatchenko | 6^{4} | 3
Q | (Slovakia) R Šramková | 4 | 7^{8} | 3
2 | (Slovakia) AK Schmiedlová | 6 | 6^{6} | 6

Semifinals
WC | (Czech Republic) L Havlíčková | 3 | 3
2 | (Slovakia) AK Schmiedlová | 6 | 6
