= 2022 Empire Women's Indoor 2 – Doubles =

Doubles
- 2022 Empire Women's Indoor 2

Final
- Champions: Sofya Lansere (Slovakia) Rebecca Šramková
- Runners-up: (Chinese Taipei) Lee Pei-chi (Chinese Taipei) Wu Fang-hsien
- Score: 4–6, 6–2, [11–9]

Events
Singles	Doubles
← 2021 ·	Empire Women's Indoor	· 2023 →

Anna Bondár and Tereza Mihalíková were the defending champions, but both players chose not to participate.

Sofya Lansere and Rebecca Šramková won the title, defeating Lee Pei-chi and Wu Fang-hsien in the final, 4–6, 6–2, [11–9].

== Seeds ==
1. (Czech Republic) Miriam Kolodziejová / (Czech Republic) Jesika Malečková (semifinals)
2. (Greece) Valentini Grammatikopoulou / Anastasia Tikhonova (quarterfinals)
3. (United Kingdom) Freya Christie / (Indonesia) Beatrice Gumulya (semifinals)
4. (Hungary) Amarissa Kiara Tóth / (Bosnia and Herzegovina) Anita Wagner (first round)

== Draw ==
=== Key ===
- Q = Qualifier
- WC = Wild card
- LL = Lucky loser
- Alt = Alternate
- SE = Special exempt
- PR = Protected ranking
- ITF = ITF entry
- JE = Junior exempt
- w/o = Walkover
- r = Retired
- d = Defaulted
- SR = Special ranking

=== Draw ===
First round
1	(Czech Republic) M Kolodziejová (Czech Republic) J Malečková	6	6
(Ukraine) Mari Kostyuk (Slovakia) L Svatíková	2	2
(Germany) T Morderger (Germany) Y Morderger	6	3	[10]
(Czech Republic) A Laboutková (Czech Republic) J Marková	4	6	[8]
4	(Hungary) AK Tóth (Bosnia and Herzegovina) A Wagner	0	2
S Lansere (Slovakia) R Šramková	6	6
(Bulgaria) A Karatancheva (Bulgaria) L Karatancheva	0	0
(Slovakia) N Daubernová (Czech Republic) L Havlíčková	6	6
(United States) B Olson (Slovakia) S Šarinová	5	3
(Slovakia) T Jarušková; M Zhabrailova	7	6
(Slovakia) A Polakovičová (Slovakia) K Žabková	1	1
3	(United Kingdom) F Christie (Indonesia) B Gumulya	6	6
(Germany) M Guth (Slovakia) E Pláteníková	4	2
(Chinese Taipei) P-c Lee (Chinese Taipei) F-h Wu	6	6
(Slovakia) L Juríková (Slovakia) N Kročková	4	4
2	(Greece) V Grammatikopoulou; A Tikhonova	6	6

Quarterfinals
1	(Czech Republic) M Kolodziejová (Czech Republic) J Malečková	6	6
(Germany) T Morderger (Germany) Y Morderger	4	1
S Lansere (Slovakia) R Šramková	6	6^{5}	[14]
(Slovakia) N Daubernová (Czech Republic) L Havlíčková	3	7^{7}	[12]
(Slovakia) T Jarušková; M Zhabrailova	3	3
3	(United Kingdom) F Christie (Indonesia) B Gumulya	6	6
(Chinese Taipei) P-c Lee (Chinese Taipei) F-h Wu	6	2	[10]
2	(Greece) V Grammatikopoulou; A Tikhonova	3	6	[7]

Semifinals
1	(Czech Republic) M Kolodziejová (Czech Republic) J Malečková	4	3
S Lansere (Slovakia) R Šramková	6	6
3	(United Kingdom) F Christie (Indonesia) B Gumulya	6	6^{6}	[5]
(Chinese Taipei) P-c Lee (Chinese Taipei) F-h Wu	1	7^{8}	[10]

Final
S Lansere (Slovakia) R Šramková	4	6	[11]
(Chinese Taipei) P-c Lee (Chinese Taipei) F-h Wu	6	2	[9]
