= 2022 Empire Women's Indoor 1 – Doubles =

Doubles
- 2022 Empire Women's Indoor 1

Final
- Champions: (Georgia (country)) Mariam Bolkvadze (United Kingdom) Maia Lumsden
- Runners-up: (Latvia) Diāna Marcinkēviča (Switzerland) Conny Perrin
- Score: 6–2, 6–3

Events
| Singles | Doubles |
| ← 2020 · | Empire Women's Indoor | · 2023 → |

Miriam Kolodziejová and Laura Ioana Paar were the defending champions, but Paar chose not to participate. Kolodziejová partnered Jesika Malečková but lost in the first round to Sonay Kartal and Katie Swan.

Mariam Bolkvadze and Maia Lumsden won the title, defeating Diāna Marcinkēviča and Conny Perrin in the final, 6–2, 6–3.

== Seeds ==
1. (Czech Republic) Miriam Kolodziejová / (Czech Republic) Jesika Malečková (first round)
2. (Greece) Valentini Grammatikopoulou / Sofya Lansere (first round)
3. (Latvia) Diāna Marcinkēviča / (Switzerland) Conny Perrin (final)
4. (Georgia (country)) Mariam Bolkvadze / (United Kingdom) Maia Lumsden (champions)

== Draw ==
=== Key ===
- Q = Qualifier
- WC = Wild card
- LL = Lucky loser
- Alt = Alternate
- SE = Special exempt
- PR = Protected ranking
- ITF = ITF entry
- JE = Junior exempt
- w/o = Walkover
- r = Retired
- d = Defaulted
- SR = Special ranking

=== Draw ===
First round
1 | (Czech Republic) M Kolodziejová (Czech Republic) J Malečková | 6 | 5 | [4]
(United Kingdom) S Kartal (United Kingdom) K Swan | 3 | 7 | [10]
(Chinese Taipei) P-c Lee (Chinese Taipei) F-h Wu | 6 | 7
WC | (Slovakia) T Jarušková; A Oktiabreva | 2 | 5
3 | (Latvia) D Marcinkēviča (Switzerland) C Perrin | 6 | 6
WC | (United States) B Olson (Slovakia) I Vojčináková | 2 | 2
WC | (Slovakia) L Juríková (Slovakia) E Pláteníková | 3 | 3
(Croatia) P Marčinko (Serbia) L Radivojević | 6 | 6
(Georgia (country)) E Gorgodze; E Koklina | 3 | 6^{4}
(Germany) T Morderger (Germany) Y Morderger | 6 | 7^{7}
(Czech Republic) D Hindová (Czech Republic) K Kubáňová | 3 | 2
4 | (Georgia (country)) M Bolkvadze (United Kingdom) M Lumsden | 6 | 6
D Astakhova (Chinese Taipei) J Garland | 6 | 6
(United Kingdom) F Christie (Slovakia) K Strešnáková | 4 | 2
E Kazionova; A Kubareva | 6 | 6
2 | (Greece) V Grammatikopoulou; S Lansere | 0 | 4

Quarterfinals
(United Kingdom) S Kartal (United Kingdom) K Swan | 6 | 7^{7}
(Chinese Taipei) P-c Lee (Chinese Taipei) F-h Wu | 3 | 6^{2}
3 | (Latvia) D Marcinkēviča (Switzerland) C Perrin | 6 | 7^{7}
(Croatia) P Marčinko (Serbia) L Radivojević | 4 | 6^{4}
(Germany) T Morderger (Germany) Y Morderger | 4 | 3
4 | (Georgia (country)) M Bolkvadze (United Kingdom) M Lumsden | 6 | 6
D Astakhova (Chinese Taipei) J Garland | 5 | 5
E Kazionova; A Kubareva | 7 | 7

Semifinals
(United Kingdom) S Kartal (United Kingdom) K Swan | 4 | 6^{3}
3 | (Latvia) D Marcinkēviča (Switzerland) C Perrin | 6 | 7^{7}
4 | (Georgia (country)) M Bolkvadze (United Kingdom) M Lumsden | 6 | 7
E Kazionova; A Kubareva | 1 | 5

Final
3 | (Latvia) D Marcinkēviča (Switzerland) C Perrin | 2 | 3
4 | (Georgia (country)) M Bolkvadze (United Kingdom) M Lumsden | 6 | 6
