= 2023 Empire Women's Indoor 3 =

Tennis tournament

- Date: 27 November – 3 December 2023
- Edition: 15th
- Category: ITF Women's World Tennis Tour
- Prize money: $60,000
- Surface: Hard / Indoor
- Location: Trnava, Slovakia

Champions

Singles
- (Australia) Arina Rodionova

Doubles
- (Slovakia) Natália Kročková / (Slovakia) Tereza Mihalíková
← 2022 ·	Empire Women's Indoor	· 2024 →

The 2023 Empire Women's Indoor 3 will a professional tennis tournament play on indoor hard courts. It was the fifteenth edition of the tournament which was part of the 2023 ITF Women's World Tennis Tour. It took place in Trnava, Slovakia between 27 November and 3 December 2023.

== Champions ==
=== Singles ===
- (Australia) Arina Rodionova def. (France) Kristina Mladenovic, 7–6^{(7–1)}, 5–7, 6–1

=== Doubles ===
- (Slovakia) Natália Kročková / (Slovakia) Tereza Mihalíková def. (France) Estelle Cascino / (Czech Republic) Jesika Malečková, 7–6^{(9–7)}, 7–5

== Singles main draw entrants ==
=== Seeds ===
Country	Player	Rank^{1}	Seed
UKR	Daria Snigur	124	1
AUS	Arina Rodionova	133	2
CRO	Tena Lukas	226	3
	Yuliya Hatouka	238	4
BUL	Gergana Topalova	239	5
UZB	Nigina Abduraimova	244	6
FRA	Kristina Mladenovic	249	7
GER	Mona Barthel	250	8

- ^{1} Rankings are as of 20 November 2023.

=== Other entrants ===
The following players received wildcards into the singles main draw:

- (Slovakia) Renáta Jamrichová
- (Slovakia) Natália Kročková
- (Slovakia) Sára Šarinová
- (Czech Republic) Vendula Valdmannová

The following player received entry into the singles main draw using a special ranking:

- (Georgia (country)) Mariam Bolkvadze

The following players received entry from the qualifying draw:

- (United Kingdom) Sarah Beth Grey
- Alevtina Ibragimova
- ~~(Slovakia) Katarína Kužmová~~
- (Czech Republic) Jesika Malečková
- (Serbia) Elena Milovanović
- Kira Pavlova
- (Czech Republic) Tereza Smitková
- (Germany) Stephanie Wagner

The following player received entry as a lucky loser:

- (Germany) Tayisiya Morderger
