= 2026 Montreux Nestlé Open =

- Date: 7–13 September 2026
- Edition: 9th
- Category: WTA 125
- Prize money: $115,000
- Surface: Clay / Outdoor
- Location: Montreux, Switzerland
- Venue: Montreux Tennis Club

Champions

Singles
- (France) Fiona Ferro

Doubles
- (Argentina) Nicole Fossa Huergo / (Czech Republic) Lucie Havlíčková
- Montreux Ladies Open

The 2026 Montreux Nestlé Open was a professional women's tennis tournament played on outdoor clay courts. It was the ninth edition of the tournament and part of the 2026 WTA 125 tournaments. It took place in Montreux, Switzerland between 7 and 13 September 2026.

== Singles main draw entrants ==
=== Seeds ===
| Country | Player | Rank^{1} | Seed |
|---|---|---|---|
| SUI | Simona Waltert | 89 | 1 |
| ESP | Marina Bassols Ribera | 133 | 2 |
| GER | Noma Noha Akugue | 137 | 3 |
| FRA | Fiona Ferro | 141 | 4 |
| ESP | Andrea Lázaro García | 142 | 5 |
| SLO | Tamara Zidanšek | 146 | 6 |
| SRB | Lola Radivojević | 150 | 7 |
| HUN | Dalma Gálfi | 157 | 8 |

- ^{1} Rankings are as of 31 August 2026.

=== Other entrants ===
The following players received wildcards into the singles main draw:

- (Switzerland) Alina Granwehr
- (United States) Gabriella Price
- (Switzerland) Simona Waltert
- (Czech Republic) Denisa Žoldáková

The following player received entry into the singles main draw through protected ranking:

- (France) Clara Burel

The following players received entry from the qualifying draw:

- (Croatia) Lucija Ćirić Bagarić
- (France) Lucie Nguyen Tan
- (Italy) Martina Trevisan
- (Switzerland) Katerina Tsygourova

=== Withdrawals ===
Before the tournament

- (United States) Ayana Akli → replaced by (Germany) Tessa Brockmann
- (Austria) Julia Grabher → replaced by (Switzerland) Valentina Ryser
- (Czech Republic) Gabriela Knutson → replaced by Anastasia Zolotareva
- (France) Alice Ramé → replaced by (Czech Republic) Barbora Palicová
- (Spain) Oksana Selekhmeteva → replaced by (Germany) Mina Hodzic

During the tournament

- (Croatia) Lucija Ćirić Bagarić

== Doubles main draw entrants ==
=== Seeds ===
| Country | Player | Country | Player | Rank^{1} | Seed |
|---|---|---|---|---|---|
| ARG | Nicole Fossa Huergo | CZE | Lucie Havlíčková | 190 | 1 |
| FRA | Estelle Cascino | CHN | Feng Shuo | 204 | 2 |

¹ Rankings are as of 31 August 2026.

=== Other entrants ===
The following pair received a wildcard into the doubles main draw:

- (Italy) Deborah Chiesa / (Switzerland) Naïma Karamoko

== Champions ==
=== Singles ===
- (France) Fiona Ferro def. (Germany) Noma Noha Akugue 6–1, 6–2

=== Doubles ===
- (Argentina) Nicole Fossa Huergo / (Czech Republic) Lucie Havlíčková def. (France) Estelle Cascino / (China) Feng Shuo, 6–3, 6–7^{(4–7)}, [10–8]
