= 2022 Empire Women's Indoor 1 – Singles =

Singles
- 2022 Empire Women's Indoor 1

Final
- Champion: (United Kingdom) Katie Swan
- Runner-up: (China) Wang Xinyu
- Score: 6–1, 3–6, 6–4

Events
Singles	Doubles
← 2020 ·	Empire Women's Indoor	· 2023 →

Sofya Lansere was the defending champion but lost in the first round to Eva Lys.

Katie Swan won the title, defeating Wang Xinyu in the final, 6–1, 3–6, 6–4.

== Seeds ==
1. (China) Wang Xinyu (final)
2. Vitalia Diatchenko (semifinals)
3. (United Kingdom) Katie Swan (champion)
4. (Georgia (country)) Ekaterine Gorgodze (first round)
5. (Germany) Eva Lys (semifinals)
6. (Austria) Sinja Kraus (first round)
7. (Greece) Valentini Grammatikopoulou (second round)
8. (United Kingdom) Sonay Kartal (quarterfinals)

== Draw ==
=== Key ===
- Q = Qualifier
- WC = Wild card
- LL = Lucky loser
- Alt = Alternate
- SE = Special exempt
- PR = Protected ranking
- ITF = ITF entry
- JE = Junior exempt
- w/o = Walkover
- r = Retired
- d = Defaulted
- SR = Special ranking

=== Finals ===
Semifinals
1	(China) Wang Xinyu	6	6
5	(Germany) Eva Lys	4	3
3	(United Kingdom) Katie Swan	6	6
2	Vitalia Diatchenko	4	1

Final
1	(China) Wang Xinyu	1	6	4
3	(United Kingdom) Katie Swan	6	3	6

=== Top half ===
First round
1	(China) Xin Wang	6	6
WC	A Oktiabreva	1	3
(Switzerland) C Perrin	4	1
A Kubareva	6	6
WC	(Slovakia) R Zelníčková	2	2
Q	(Slovakia) R Jamrichová	6	6
WC	(Slovakia) R Šramková	6	6
6	(Austria) S Kraus	2	2
4	(Georgia (country)) E Gorgodze	6	2	3
(Georgia (country)) M Bolkvadze	4	6	6
E Kazionova	5	4
Q	V Lapko	7	6
(Czech Republic) J Malečková	6^{1}	6^{4}
(Latvia) D Marcinkēviča	7^{7}	7^{7}
S Lansere	4	4
5	(Germany) E Lys	6	6

Second round
1	(China) Xin Wang	6	6
A Kubareva	0	4
Q	(Slovakia) R Jamrichová	3	7^{7}	6
WC	(Slovakia) R Šramková	6	6^{5}	4
(Georgia (country)) M Bolkvadze	6^{5}	4
Q	V Lapko	7^{7}	6
(Latvia) D Marcinkēviča	4	7	0
5	(Germany) E Lys	6	5	6

Quarterfinals
1	(China) Xin Wang	6	6
Q	(Slovakia) R Jamrichová	4	3
Q	V Lapko	3	6	2
5	(Germany) E Lys	6	3	6

Semifinals
1	(China) Xin Wang	6	6
5	(Germany) E Lys	4	3

=== Bottom half ===
First round
7	(Greece) V Grammatikopoulou	6	6
Q	(Germany) K Kanev	3	0
PR	(United Kingdom) M Lumsden	6	6
WC	(Slovakia) E Pláteníková	2	2
Q	(Serbia) L Radivojević	6	6^{6}	7^{7}
D Astakhova	4	7^{8}	6^{2}
Q	(United Kingdom) F Christie	3	3
3	(United Kingdom) K Swan	6	6
8	(United Kingdom) S Kartal	7^{7}	6
(Croatia) J Fett	6^{5}	1
JE	(Croatia) P Marčinko	6	6
Q	(Switzerland) A Rushiti	3	2
(Chinese Taipei) J Garland	3	4
Q	(Germany) M Barthel	6	6
Q	(Slovakia) S Milatová	1	7	3
2	V Diatchenko	6	5	6

Second round
7	(Greece) V Grammatikopoulou	6	4	3
PR	(United Kingdom) M Lumsden	4	6	6
Q	(Serbia) L Radivojević	2	2
3	(United Kingdom) K Swan	6	6
8	(United Kingdom) S Kartal	6	2	6
JE	(Croatia) P Marčinko	3	6	4
Q	(Germany) M Barthel	6^{6}	6^{2}
2	V Diatchenko	7^{8}	7^{7}

Quarterfinals
PR	(United Kingdom) M Lumsden	2	1
3	(United Kingdom) K Swan	6	6
8	(United Kingdom) S Kartal	2	6	4
2	V Diatchenko	6	1	6

Semifinals
3	(United Kingdom) K Swan	6	6
2	V Diatchenko	4	1
