= 2023 Empire Women's Indoor 2 – Doubles =

Doubles
- 2023 Empire Women's Indoor 2

Final
- Champions: (United Kingdom) Alicia Barnett (United Kingdom) Olivia Nicholls
- Runners-up: Amina Anshba (Czech Republic) Anastasia Dețiuc
- Score: 6–3, 6–3

Events
Singles	Doubles
← 2022 ·	Empire Women's Indoor	· 2024 →

Sofya Lansere and Rebecca Šramková were the defending champions but chose not to participate.

Alicia Barnett and Olivia Nicholls won the title, defeating Amina Anshba and Anastasia Dețiuc in the final, 6–3, 6–3.

== Seeds ==
1. (United Kingdom) Alicia Barnett / (United Kingdom) Olivia Nicholls (champions)
2. (Poland) Weronika Falkowska / (Poland) Katarzyna Kawa (semifinals)
3. Amina Anshba / (Czech Republic) Anastasia Dețiuc (final)
4. (Germany) Vivian Heisen / (Germany) Julia Lohoff (quarterfinals)

== Draw ==
=== Key ===
- Q = Qualifier
- WC = Wild card
- LL = Lucky loser
- Alt = Alternate
- SE = Special exempt
- PR = Protected ranking
- ITF = ITF entry
- JE = Junior exempt
- w/o = Walkover
- r = Retired
- d = Defaulted
- SR = Special ranking

First round
1	(United Kingdom) A Barnett (United Kingdom) O Nicholls	6	6
(Estonia) E Malõgina (Bosnia and Herzegovina) A Wagner	4	0
WC	(Czech Republic) A Šmejkalová (Ukraine) A Tkachenko	4	2
(Slovenia) V Erjavec (United Kingdom) E Webley-Smith	6	6
4	(Germany) V Heisen (Germany) J Lohoff	6	7
M Bondarenko (Romania) IG Ghioroaie	4	5
(Philippines) A Eala (Lithuania) J Mikulskytė	6	6
WC	(Slovakia) E Pláteníková (Slovakia) N Vargová	1	0
(Croatia) M Dražić (Greece) S Sakellaridi	6	3	[10]
(Germany) T Morderger (Germany) Y Morderger	1	6	[7]
WC	(Slovakia) N Kročková (Czech Republic) T Smitková	1	6	[6]
3	A Anshba (Czech Republic) A Dețiuc	6	4	[10]
(Latvia) D Semeņistaja (Czech Republic) A Sisková	4	3
(France) E Jacquemot (Czech Republic) B Palicová	6	6
(Poland) M Chwalińska (Czech Republic) J Malečková	4	4
2	(Poland) W Falkowska (Poland) K Kawa	6	6

Quarterfinals
1	(United Kingdom) A Barnett (United Kingdom) O Nicholls	6	7
(Slovenia) V Erjavec (United Kingdom) E Webley-Smith	2	5
4	(Germany) V Heisen (Germany) J Lohoff	5	4
(Philippines) A Eala (Lithuania) J Mikulskytė	7	6
(Croatia) M Dražić (Greece) S Sakellaridi	4	1
3	A Anshba (Czech Republic) A Dețiuc	6	6
(France) E Jacquemot (Czech Republic) B Palicová	3	7	[5]
2	(Poland) W Falkowska (Poland) K Kawa	6	5	[10]

Semifinals
1	(United Kingdom) A Barnett (United Kingdom) O Nicholls	6	6
(Philippines) A Eala (Lithuania) J Mikulskytė	4	1
3	A Anshba (Czech Republic) A Dețiuc	2	7	[10]
2	(Poland) W Falkowska (Poland) K Kawa	6	5	[7]

Final
1	(United Kingdom) A Barnett (United Kingdom) O Nicholls	6	6
3	A Anshba (Czech Republic) A Dețiuc	3	3
