= 2026 Montreux Nestlé Open – Singles =

Singles
- 2026 Montreux Nestlé Open

Final
- Champion: (France) Fiona Ferro
- Runner-up: (Germany) Noma Noha Akugue
- Score: 6–1, 6–2

Events
| Singles | Doubles |
- Montreux Ladies Open

Fiona Ferro won the title, defeating Noma Noha Akugue 6–1, 6–2 in the final.

Maja Chwalińska was the reigning champion but chose not to participate.

== Seeds ==
1. (Switzerland) Simona Waltert (quarterfinals)
2. (Spain) Marina Bassols Ribera (first round)
3. (Germany) Noma Noha Akugue (final)
4. (France) Fiona Ferro (champion)
5. (Spain) Andrea Lázaro García (second round)
6. (Slovenia) Tamara Zidanšek (first round)
7. (Serbia) Lola Radivojević (first round)
8. (Hungary) Dalma Gálfi (semifinals)

== Draw ==
Key

- Q = Qualifier
- WC = Wild card
- LL = Lucky loser
- Alt = Alternate
- ITF = ITF entry
- PR = Protected ranking
- SR = Special ranking
- SE = Special exempt
- JE = Junior exempt
- JR = Junior Accelerator Programme entrant
- CO = College Accelerator Programme entrant
- NG = Next Gen Accelerator Program entrant
- w/o = Walkover
- r = Retired
- d = Defaulted

=== Finals ===
Semifinals
8 | (Hungary) Dalma Gálfi | 1 | 6 | 0
4 | (France) Fiona Ferro | 6 | 2 | 6
3 | (Germany) Noma Noha Akugue | 7^{7} | 6
(Spain) Guiomar Maristany | 6^{2} | 3

Final
4 | (France) Fiona Ferro | 6 | 6
3 | (Germany) Noma Noha Akugue | 1 | 2

=== Top half ===
First round
1/WC | (Switzerland) S Waltert | 7^{7} | 3 | 6
(Switzerland) R Masarova | 6^{4} | 6 | 2
A Zolotareva | 7^{7} | 3 | 4
(Greece) D Papamichail | 6^{3} | 6 | 6
(Italy) N Brancaccio | 6 | 7
(Malta) F Curmi | 4 | 5
(Switzerland) V Ryser | 4 | 3
8 | (Hungary) D Gálfi | 6 | 6
4 | (France) F Ferro | 6 | 6
(Germany) M Barthel | 3 | 4
(France) A Tubello | 6 | 4 | 1
(Czech Republic) B Palicová | 3 | 6 | 6
Q | (Croatia) L Ćirić Bagarić | 7^{7} | 6
WC | (United States) G Price | 6^{5} | 3
(Czech Republic) L Havlíčková | 7^{7} | 6
7 | (Serbia) L Radivojević | 6^{4} | 1

Second round
1/WC | (Switzerland) S Waltert | 2 | 6 | 6
(Greece) D Papamichail | 6 | 1 | 3
(Italy) N Brancaccio | 6 | 1 | 6^{6}
8 | (Hungary) D Gálfi | 4 | 6 | 7^{8}
4 | (France) F Ferro | 6 | 6
(Czech Republic) B Palicová | 4 | 4
Q | (Croatia) L Ćirić Bagarić
(Czech Republic) L Havlíčková | w/o

Quarterfinals
1/WC | (Switzerland) S Waltert | 2 | 2
8 | (Hungary) D Gálfi | 6 | 6
4 | (France) F Ferro | 6 | 6
(Czech Republic) L Havlíčková | 4 | 0

Semifinals
8 | (Hungary) D Gálfi | 1 | 6 | 0
4 | (France) F Ferro | 6 | 2 | 6

=== Bottom half ===
First round
5 | (Spain) A Lázaro García | 6 | 6
(Spain) Á Fita Boluda | 3 | 1
(Germany) M Hodzic | 2 | 6 | 5
(Ukraine) A Sobolieva | 6 | 4 | 7
Q | (France) L Nguyen Tan | 3 | 7 | 4
WC | (Switzerland) A Granwehr | 6 | 5 | 6
WC | (Czech Republic) D Žoldáková | 7 | 2 | 4
3 | (Germany) N Noha Akugue | 5 | 6 | 6
6 | (Slovenia) T Zidanšek | 6 | 6^{4} | 3
(Germany) T Brockmann | 4 | 7^{7} | 6
Q | (Switzerland) K Tsygourova | 1 | 4
PR | (France) C Burel | 6 | 6
Q | (Italy) M Trevisan | 7 | 0 | 6
(Italy) J Ruggeri | 5 | 6 | 4
(Spain) G Maristany | 6 | 6
2 | (Spain) M Bassols Ribera | 2 | 1

Second round
5 | (Spain) A Lázaro García | 0 | 3
(Ukraine) A Sobolieva | 6 | 6
WC | (Switzerland) A Granwehr | 5 | 3
3 | (Germany) N Noha Akugue | 7 | 6
(Germany) T Brockmann | 4 | 1
PR | (France) C Burel | 6 | 6
Q | (Italy) M Trevisan | 2 | 6 | 6^{4}
(Spain) G Maristany | 6 | 4 | 7^{7}

Quarterfinals
(Ukraine) A Sobolieva | 1 | 6^{7}
3 | (Germany) N Noha Akugue | 6 | 7^{9}
PR | (France) C Burel | 3 | 6 | 1
(Spain) G Maristany | 6 | 1 | 6

Semifinals
3 | (Germany) N Noha Akugue | 7^{7} | 6
(Spain) G Maristany | 6^{2} | 3

== Qualifying ==
=== Seeds ===
1. (Sweden) Lisa Zaar (first round)
2. (France) Amandine Monnot (first round)
3. (Italy) Martina Trevisan (qualified)
4. (Italy) Deborah Chiesa (qualifying competition)
5. (United States) Madison Sieg (qualifying competition)
6. (Ukraine) Yelyzaveta Kotliar (first round, retired)
7. (Italy) Dalila Spiteri (qualifying competition)
8. (Croatia) Lucija Ćirić Bagarić (qualified)

=== Qualifiers ===
1. (Switzerland) Katerina Tsygourova
2. (France) Lucie Nguyen Tan
3. (Italy) Martina Trevisan
4. (Croatia) Lucija Ćirić Bagarić

=== Draw ===
==== First qualifier ====
First round
1 | (Sweden) Lisa Zaar | 5 | 6 | 6^{5}
(Switzerland) Katerina Tsygourova | 7 | 3 | 7^{5}
WC | (Switzerland) Noelia Manta | 6 | 4 | 3
5 | (United States) Madison Sieg | 3 | 6 | 6

Qualifying competition
(Switzerland) Katerina Tsygourova | 6 | 6
5 | (United States) Madison Sieg | 2 | 3

==== Second qualifier ====
First round
2 | (France) Amandine Monnot | 6 | 3 | 6^{4}
(France) Lucie Nguyen Tan | 1 | 6 | 7^{7}
(Italy) Tatiana Pieri | 2 | 0^{r}
7 | (Italy) Dalila Spiteri | 6 | 0

Qualifying competition
(France) Lucie Nguyen Tan | 4 | 6 | 6
7 | (Italy) Dalila Spiteri | 6 | 4 | 2

==== Third qualifier ====
First round
3 | (Italy) Martina Trevisan | 6 | 6
(Germany) Julia Stusek | 1 | 0
WC | (Italy) Elsa Bonelli | 5
6 | (Ukraine) Yelyzaveta Kotliar | 2^{r}

Qualifying competition
3 | (Italy) Martina Trevisan | 6 | 6
WC | (Italy) Elsa Bonelli | 0 | 1

==== Fourth qualifier ====
First round
4 | (Italy) Deborah Chiesa | 6 | 6
(France) Diana Martynov | 3 | 3
(Germany) Jule Niemeier | 6^{8} | 3
8 | (Croatia) Lucija Ćirić Bagarić | 7^{10} | 6

Qualifying competition
4 | (Italy) Deborah Chiesa | 6 | 2 | 2
8 | (Croatia) Lucija Ćirić Bagarić | 3 | 6 | 6
