= 2024 Empire Women's Indoor 2 – Doubles =

Doubles
- 2024 Empire Women's Indoor 2

Final
- Champions: (Netherlands) Isabelle Haverlag (United States) Anna Rogers
- Runners-up: (Chinese Taipei) Liang En-shuo (China) Tang Qianhui
- Score: 6–3, 4–6, [12–10]

Events
Singles	Doubles
← 2023 ·	Empire Women's Indoor	· 2025 →

Alicia Barnett and Olivia Nicholls were the defending champions but Nicholls chose not to participate. Barnett partnered alongside Freya Christie but lost in the first round to Liang En-shuo and Tang Qianhui.

Isabelle Haverlag and Anna Rogers won the title, defeating Liang and Tang in the final, 6–3, 4–6, [12–10].

== Seeds ==
1. Amina Anshba / (Czech Republic) Anastasia Dețiuc (quarterfinals)
2. (Germany) Julia Lohoff / (Switzerland) Conny Perrin (quarterfinals)
3. (United Kingdom) Alicia Barnett / (United Kingdom) Freya Christie (first round)
4. (Poland) Weronika Falkowska / (Hungary) Fanny Stollár (quarterfinals)

== Draw ==
Key

- Q = Qualifier
- WC = Wild card
- LL = Lucky loser
- Alt = Alternate
- ITF = ITF entry
- PR = Protected ranking
- SR = Special ranking
- SE = Special exempt
- JE = Junior exempt
- JR = Junior Accelerator Programme entrant
- CO = College Accelerator Programme entrant
- NG = Next Gen Accelerator Program entrant
- w/o = Walkover
- r = Retired
- d = Defaulted

First round
1	A Anshba (Czech Republic) A Dețiuc	6	3	[12]
(Slovenia) V Erjavec (Slovenia) T Zidanšek	4	6	[10]
WC	A Falei; E Pridankina	3	6^{5}
WC	(Switzerland) L Sun (Ukraine) K Zavatska	6	7^{7}
3	(United Kingdom) A Barnett (United Kingdom) F Christie	6	6^{5}	[2]
(Chinese Taipei) E-s Liang (China) Q Tang	2	7^{7}	[10]
(Australia) K Birrell (Japan) M Uchijima	4	6	[13]
(France) E Cascino (Czech Republic) J Malečková	6	4	[15]
(Hungary) A Bondár (Switzerland) C Naef	6	3	[11]
P Kudermetova; A Tikhonova	1	6	[9]
(Romania) M Bulgaru (Romania) E-G Ruse	5	6	[4]
4	(Poland) W Falkowska (Hungary) F Stollár	7	3	[10]
(Netherlands) I Haverlag (United States) A Rogers	6	7^{7}
(Georgia (country)) N Dzalamidze (Hungary) P Udvardy	2	6^{4}
WC	(Slovakia) A Polakovičová (Slovakia) S Šarinová	2	1
2	(Germany) J Lohoff (Switzerland) C Perrin	6	6

Quarterfinals
1	A Anshba (Czech Republic) A Dețiuc	7^{7}	4	[7]
WC	(Switzerland) L Sun (Ukraine) K Zavatska	6^{6}	6	[10]
(Chinese Taipei) E-s Liang (China) Q Tang	6	7^{9}
(France) E Cascino (Czech Republic) J Malečková	4	6^{7}
(Hungary) A Bondár (Switzerland) C Naef	7	6
4	(Poland) W Falkowska (Hungary) F Stollár	5	3
(Netherlands) I Haverlag (United States) A Rogers	7^{10}	6
2	(Germany) J Lohoff (Switzerland) C Perrin	6^{8}	4

Semifinals
WC	(Switzerland) L Sun (Ukraine) K Zavatska	3	6	[7]
(Chinese Taipei) E-s Liang (China) Q Tang	6	4	[10]
(Hungary) A Bondár (Switzerland) C Naef	6^{4}	6	[11]
(Netherlands) I Haverlag (United States) A Rogers	7^{7}	4	[13]

Final
(Chinese Taipei) E-s Liang (China) Q Tang	3	6	[10]
(Netherlands) I Haverlag (United States) A Rogers	6	4	[12]
