= 2023 Empire Women's Indoor 3 – Doubles =

Doubles
- 2023 Empire Women's Indoor 3

Final
- Champions: (Slovakia) Natália Kročková (Slovakia) Tereza Mihalíková
- Runners-up: (France) Estelle Cascino (Czech Republic) Jesika Malečková
- Score: 7–6^{(9–7)}, 7–5

Events
Singles	Doubles
← 2022 ·	Empire Women's Indoor	· 2024 →

Lea Bošković and Weronika Falkowska are the defending champions, but Bošković chose play the ITF W25 category Lousada Indoor Open and Falkowska chose not to participate.

Natália Kročková and Tereza Mihalíková won the title, defeating Estelle Cascino and Jesika Malečková in the final, 7–6^{(9–7)}, 7–5.

== Seeds ==
1. (Georgia (country)) Natela Dzalamidze / (Italy) Angelica Moratelli (quarterfinals)
2. (France) Estelle Cascino / (Czech Republic) Jesika Malečková (final)
3. (Uzbekistan) Nigina Abduraimova / (United Kingdom) Sarah Beth Grey (quarterfinals, withdrew)
4. (Ukraine) Maryna Kolb / (Ukraine) Nadiya Kolb (first round)

== Draw ==
=== Key ===
- Q = Qualifier
- WC = Wild card
- LL = Lucky loser
- Alt = Alternate
- ITF = ITF entry
- PR = Protected ranking
- SR = Special ranking
- SE = Special exempt
- JE = Junior exempt
- JR = Junior Accelerator Programme entrant
- CO = College Accelerator Programme entrant
- NG = Next Gen Accelerator Program entrant
- w/o = Walkover
- r = Retired
- d = Defaulted

=== Draw ===
First round
1	(Georgia (country)) N Dzalamidze (Italy) A Moratelli	6	6
(Czech Republic) A Laboutková (Ukraine) A Soboleva	3	4
(Georgia (country)) M Bolkvadze (Netherlands) I Haverlag	6	6
(Germany) T Morderger (Germany) Y Morderger	3	3
3	(Uzbekistan) N Abduraimova (United Kingdom) SB Grey	6	6
WC	(Slovakia) G Naňová (Slovakia) A Polakovičová	2	1
WC	(Slovakia) N Kročková (Slovakia) T Mihalíková	1
(Netherlands) M Hoedt (Croatia) I Primorac	2^{r}
Alt	(Slovakia) A Jašková (Slovakia) K Šupová	4	1
WC	(Slovakia) S Šarinová (India) V Shinde	6	6
(Switzerland) N Keller; K Pavlova	5	7^{7}	[10]
4	(Ukraine) M Kolb (Ukraine) N Kolb	7	6^{2}	[6]
Alt	(Slovakia) V Lacková (Slovakia) E Mravcová	3	3
A Ibragimova (Czech Republic) A Kučmová	6	6
(Romania) Ș Bojică (Slovakia) S Drugdová	4	5
2	(France) E Cascino (Czech Republic) J Malečková	6	7

Quarterfinals
1	(Georgia (country)) N Dzalamidze (Italy) A Moratelli	6	3	[9]
(Georgia (country)) M Bolkvadze (Netherlands) I Haverlag	4	6	[11]
3	(Uzbekistan) N Abduraimova (United Kingdom) SB Grey
WC	(Slovakia) N Kročková (Slovakia) T Mihalíková	w/o
WC	(Slovakia) S Šarinová (India) V Shinde	2	0
(Switzerland) N Keller; K Pavlova	6	6
A Ibragimova (Czech Republic) A Kučmová	4	5
2	(France) E Cascino (Czech Republic) J Malečková	6	7

Semifinals
(Georgia (country)) M Bolkvadze (Netherlands) I Haverlag	3	6	[5]
WC	(Slovakia) N Kročková (Slovakia) T Mihalíková	6	2	[10]
(Switzerland) N Keller; K Pavlova	1	1
2	(France) E Cascino (Czech Republic) J Malečková	6	6

Final
WC	(Slovakia) N Kročková (Slovakia) T Mihalíková	7^{9}	7
2	(France) E Cascino (Czech Republic) J Malečková	6^{7}	5
