= 2026 Montreux Nestlé Open – Doubles =

Doubles
- 2026 Montreux Nestlé Open

Final
- Champions: (Argentina) Nicole Fossa Huergo (Czech Republic) Lucie Havlíčková
- Runners-up: (France) Estelle Cascino (China) Feng Shuo
- Score: 6–3, 6–7^{(4–7)}, [10–8]

Events
Singles	Doubles
- Montreux Ladies Open

Nicole Fossa Huergo and Lucie Havlíčková won the title, defeating Estelle Cascino and Feng Shuo 6–3, 6–7^{(4–7)}, [10–8] in the final.

Oksana Selekhmeteva and Simona Waltert were the reigning champions. but did not participate this year.

== Seeds ==
1. (Argentina) Nicole Fossa Huergo / (Czech Republic) Lucie Havlíčková (champions)
2. (France) Estelle Cascino / (China) Feng Shuo (final)

== Draw ==
Key

- Q = Qualifier
- WC = Wild card
- LL = Lucky loser
- Alt = Alternate
- ITF = ITF entry
- PR = Protected ranking
- SR = Special ranking
- SE = Special exempt
- JE = Junior exempt
- JR = Junior Accelerator Programme entrant
- CO = College Accelerator Programme entrant
- NG = Next Gen Accelerator Program entrant
- w/o = Walkover
- r = Retired
- d = Defaulted

=== Draw ===
Quarterfinals
1	(Argentina) N Fossa Huergo (Czech Republic) L Havlíčková	7^{7}	7^{7}
(United Kingdom) F Christie (United Kingdom) E Silva	6^{5}	6^{4}
(Germany) N Noha Akugue (Ukraine) A Sobolieva	6	5	[6]
WC	(Italy) D Chiesa (Switzerland) N Karamoko	4	7	[10]
(Serbia) L Radivojević; A Zolotareva	3	0
(Italy) N Brancaccio (Greece) D Papamichail	6	6
(Croatia) L Ćirić Bagarić (Italy) A Moratelli	4	6	[10]
2	(France) E Cascino (China) S Feng	6	4	[12]

Semifinals
1	(Argentina) N Fossa Huergo (Czech Republic) L Havlíčková	6	6
WC	(Italy) D Chiesa (Switzerland) N Karamoko	4	2
(Italy) N Brancaccio (Greece) D Papamichail	3	2
2	(France) E Cascino (China) S Feng	6	6

Final
1	(Argentina) N Fossa Huergo (Czech Republic) L Havlíčková	6	6^{4}	[10]
2	(France) E Cascino (China) S Feng	3	7^{7}	[8]
