= Lee Pei-chi =

Taiwanese tennis player

Lee Pei-chi 李珮琪
- Country (sports): Chinese Taipei
- Born: 16 October 1994 (age 31)
- Plays: Right (two-handed both sides)
- Prize money: $142,949

Singles
- Career record: 362–268
- Career titles: 11 ITF
- Highest ranking: No. 389 (31 March 2014)

Doubles
- Career record: 320–224
- Career titles: 21 ITF
- Highest ranking: No. 216 (22 May 2023)

Team competitions
- Fed Cup: 1–3

Lee Pei-chi
Medal record

Women's Tennis

Representing Chinese Taipei

Summer Universiade
Silver medal – second place	2019 Naples	Women's doubles

Lee Pei-chi
- Traditional Chinese: 李珮琪
- Simplified Chinese: 李珮琪
Transcriptions
Standard Mandarin
- Hanyu Pinyin: Lǐ Pèiqí

Lee Pei-chi (Chinese: 李珮琪; born 16 October 1994) is a Taiwanese inactive tennis player.

Lee has won 11 singles and 21 doubles titles on the ITF Women's Circuit. On 31 March 2014, she reached her best singles ranking of world No. 389. On 22 May 2023, she peaked at No. 216 in the doubles rankings.

Lee made her WTA Tour main-draw debut at the 2016 Taiwan Open in the singles and doubles competitions.

== ITF Circuit finals ==
=== Singles: 20 (11 titles, 9 runner-ups) ===
Legend $50,000 tournaments $25,000 tournaments (0–1) $10/15,000 tournaments (11–8)	Finals by surface Hard (11–7) Clay (0–1) Carpet (0–1)

Result	W–L	Date	Tournament	Tier	Surface	Opponent	Score
Win	1–0	May 2012	ITF New Delhi, India	10,000	Hard	(India) Natasha Palha	6–4, 6–2
Loss	1–1	Apr 2013	ITF Heraklion, Greece	10,000	Carpet	(Greece) Valentini; Grammatikopoulou	6–7^{(4)}, 6–3, 2–6
Win	2–1	May 2013	ITF Athens, Greece	10,000	Hard	(Serbia) Marina Kachar	6–1, 7–5
Win	3–1	May 2013	ITF Athens, Greece	10,000	Hard	(Greece) Despoina Vogasari	6–2, 6–3
Loss	3–2	Sep 2013	ITF Yeongwol, South Korea	10,000	Hard	(China) Wang Yafan	6–2, 1–6, 2–6
Loss	3–3	Sep 2013	ITF Athens, Greece	10,000	Hard	(Russia) Polina Leykina	7–5, 4–6, 3–6
Loss	3–4	Jun 2014	ITF Bangkok, Thailand	10,000	Hard	(Belgium) Elise Mertens	3–6, 2–6
Win	4–4	May 2015	ITF Tarakan, Indonesia	10,000	Hard (i)	(Indonesia) Rifanty Kahfiani	6–0, 6–1
Loss	4–5	Sep 2015	ITF Solo, Indonesia	10,000	Hard	(Netherlands) Chayenne Ewijk	4–6, 7–5, 2–6
Win	5–5	Jun 2017	ITF Taipei, Taiwan	15,000	Hard	(Japan) Haruka Kaji	3–6, 7–5, 6–2
Win	6–5	Sep 2017	ITF Sharm El Sheikh, Egypt	15,000	Hard	(Belgium) Magali Kempen	7–6^{(3)}, 6–3
Loss	6–6	Oct 2017	ITF Sharm El Sheikh	15,000	Hard	(Belgium) Magali Kempen	7–6^{(4)}, 6–7^{(5)}, 4–6
Win	7–6	Oct 2017	ITF Sharm El Sheikh	15,000	Hard	(Switzerland) Arlinda Rushiti	6–0, 6–3
Loss	7–7	Jul 2018	ITF Taipei, Taiwan	15,000	Hard	(Hong Kong) Wu Ho-ching	6–3, 4–5 ret.
Win	8–7	Nov 2019	ITF Sharm El Sheikh	15,000	Hard	(Austria) Melanie Klaffner	6–2, 2–6, 6–2
Win	9–7	Nov 2019	ITF Sharm El Sheikh	15,000	Hard	(Czech Republic) Martina Přádová	6–4, 7–6^{(3)}
Win	10–7	Nov 2019	ITF Sharm El Sheikh	15,000	Hard	(Russia) Anna Morgina	6–2, 6–4
Loss	10–8	Dec 2019	ITF Nonthaburi, Thailand	15,000	Hard	(Uzbekistan) Nigina Abduraimova	1–6, 6–1, 3–6
Win	11–8	Apr 2022	ITF Sharm El Sheikh	W15	Hard	(Chinese Taipei) Lee Ya-hsuan	6–4, 6–7^{(6)}, 6–3
Loss	11–9	Jun 2023	ITF Tainan, Taiwan	W25	Clay	(Chinese Taipei) Yang Ya-yi	2–6, 1–6

=== Doubles: 47 (21 titles, 26 runner-ups) ===
Legend $60,000 tournaments (0–1) $40,000 tournaments (0–1) $25,000 tournaments (7–8) $10/15,000 tournaments (14–16)	Finals by surface Hard (19–23) Clay (2–3)

Result	W–L	Date	Tournament	Tier	Surface	Partner	Opponents	Score
Loss	0–1	Sep 2011	ITF Yeongwol, South Korea	10,000	Hard	(Chinese Taipei) Lee Hua-chen	(South Korea) Kim Jin-hee (South Korea) Kim Ji-young	1–6, 1–6
Loss	0–2	Feb 2012	ITF Antalya, Turkey	10,000	Clay	(Chinese Taipei) Lee Hua-chen	(Belarus) Ksenia Milevskaya (Ukraine) Yuliya Beygelzimer	3–6, 6–7^{(4)}
Loss	0–3	Sep 2012	ITF Gulbarga, India	10,000	Hard	(Chinese Taipei) Yang Chia-hsien	(South Korea) Kim Hae-sung (South Korea) Kim Ju-eun	1–6, 1–6
Loss	0–4	Jul 2013	ITF Bangkok, Thailand	10,000	Hard	(Thailand) Varunya Wongteanchai	(China) Lu Jiajing (China) Lu Jiaxiang	4–6, 4–6
Loss	0–5	Sep 2013	ITF Athens, Greece	10,000	Hard	(Greece) Maria Sakkari	(Israel) Keren Shlomo (Israel) Saray Sterenbach	6–3, 1–6, [8–10]
Loss	0–6	Nov 2013	ITF São Paulo, Brazil	10,000	Clay	(Brazil) Gabriela Cé	(Brazil) Nathaly Kurata (Brazil) Eduarda Piai	1–6, 6–1, [8–10]
Loss	0–7	Apr 2014	ITF Antalya, Turkey	10,000	Hard	(Ukraine) Alona Fomina	(Mexico) Victoria Rodríguez (Mexico) Marcela Zacarías	4–6, 6–4, [5–10]
Win	1–7	Jun 2014	ITF Taipei, Taiwan	10,000	Hard	(Chinese Taipei) Kao Shao-yuan	(Japan) Mai Minokoshi (Japan) Akiko Omae	6–1, 6–4
Loss	1–8	Jun 2014	ITF Bangkok, Thailand	10,000	Hard	(Thailand) Nungnadda Wannasuk	(Japan) Yumi Miyazaki (Japan) Kotomi Takahata	3–6, 1–6
Loss	1–9	Nov 2014	ITF Phuket, Thailand	15,000	Hard (i)	(Thailand) Kamonwan Buayam	(Thailand) Peangtarn Plipuech (Thailand) Nicha Lertpitaksinchai	5–7, 3–6
Loss	1–10	Feb 2015	ITF New Delhi, India	25,000	Hard	(Chinese Taipei) Hsu Ching-wen	(China) Tang Haochen (China) Yang Zhaoxuan	5–7, 1–6
Loss	1–11	Feb 2015	ITF Aurangabad, India	25,000	Clay	(Chinese Taipei) Hsu Ching-wen	(Chinese Taipei) Lee Ya-hsuan (Thailand) Varatchaya Wongteanchai	1–6, 6–7^{(4)}
Loss	1–12	Mar 2015	ITF Jiangmen, China	10,000	Hard	(China) Li Yihong	(South Korea) Choi Ji-hee (South Korea) Kim Na-ri	6–4, 2–6, [9–11]
Win	2–12	Apr 2015	ITF Heraklion, Greece	10,000	Hard	(India) Sharmada Balu	(Serbia) Tamara Čurović (Belarus) Aryna Sabalenka	4–6, 6–3, [10–2]
Win	3–12	May 2015	ITF Tarakan, Indonesia	10,000	Hard (i)	(Japan) Hirono Watanabe	(India) Ashmitha Easwaramurthi (China) Yu Yuanyi	5–7, 6–1, [10–6]
Win	4–12	Jun 2015	ITF Kaohsiung, Taiwan	10,000	Hard	(Japan) Hirono Watanabe	(Chinese Taipei) Lee Ya-hsuan (Chinese Taipei) Pai Ya-yun	6–3, 7–5
Loss	4–13	Sep 2015	ITF Kyoto, Japan	10,000	Hard (i)	(Chinese Taipei) Hsu Ching-wen	(Japan) Akari Inoue (Japan) Miki Miyamura	3–6, 0–6
Win	5–13	Mar 2016	ITF Nanjing, China	10,000	Hard	(China) Zhang Ying	(China) Xun Fangying (China) Zhao Di	6–2, 7–5
Loss	5–14	May 2016	ITF Incheon, South Korea	25,000	Hard	(Thailand) Kamonwan Buayam	(South Korea) Han Sung-hee (Japan) Makoto Ninomiya	3–6, 1–6
Win	6–14	Jun 2016	ITF Kaohsiung, South Korea	10,000	Hard	(Chinese Taipei) Chien Pei-ju	(Chinese Taipei) Cho I-hsuan (Chinese Taipei) Lee Hua-chen	7–5, 6–2
Loss	6–15	Sep 2016	ITF Hua Hin, Thailand	25,000	Hard	(Thailand) Kamonwan Buayam	(Poland) Katarzyna Kawa (Brazil) Laura Pigossi	5–7, 7–6^{(4)}, [6–10]
Loss	6–16	Oct 2016	ITF Hua Hin	10,000	Hard	(Thailand) Kamonwan Buayam	(Chinese Taipei) Cho I-hsuan (China) Zhang Yukun	6–2, 3–6, [7–10]
Win	7–16	Dec 2016	ITF Cairo, Egypt	10,000	Clay	(Portugal) Inês Murta	(Germany) Lisa-Marie Mätschke (Austria) Kerstin Peckl	6–1, 6–0
Win	8–16	Sep 2017	ITF Yeongwol, South Korea	15,000	Hard	(South Korea) Kim Na-ri	(South Korea) Choi Ji-hee (South Korea) Kang Seo-kyung	6–2, 6–2
Win	9–16	Sep 2017	ITF Yeongwol	15,000	Hard	(South Korea) Kim Na-ri	(South Korea) Kim Da-bin (South Korea) Lee So-ra	6–1, 7–5
Loss	9–17	Sep 2017	ITF Sharm El Sheikh, Egypt	15,000	Hard	(Chinese Taipei) Hsieh Yu-ting	(Chinese Taipei) Chen Pei-hsuan (Chinese Taipei) Wu Fang-hsien	6–7^{(6)}, 6–3, [9–11]
Loss	9–18	Oct 2017	ITF Sharm El Sheikh	15,000	Hard	(India) Kanika Vaidya	(Chinese Taipei) Chen Pei-hsuan (Chinese Taipei) Wu Fang-hsien	0–6, 6–1, [7–10]
Loss	9–19	Nov 2017	Pune Championships, India	25,000	Hard	(Russia) Yana Sizikova	(Romania) Jaqueline Cristian (Slovakia) Tereza Mihalíková	6–4, 3–6, [7–10]
Loss	9–20	Feb 2018	ITF Sharm El Sheikh	15,000	Hard	(India) Pranjala Yadlapalli	(Italy) Martina Colmegna (Russia) Valeriya Solovyeva	2–6, 3–6
Win	10–20	Mar 2018	ITF Sharm El Sheikh	15,000	Hard	(Belarus) Yuliya Hatouka	(Romania) Laura Ioana Andrei (Bulgaria) Julia Terziyska	4–6, 7–6^{(5)}, [10–8]
Win	11–20	Jun 2018	ITF Hong Kong	25,000	Hard	(Indonesia) Jessy Rompies	(France) Victoria Muntean (India) Pranjala Yadlapalli	6–3, 6–4
Win	12–20	Jul 2018	ITF Nonthaburi, Thailand	25,000	Hard	(Japan) Robu Kajitani	(China) Guo Hanyu (Thailand) Peangtarn Plipuech	6–4, 6–2
Win	13–20	Jan 2019	ITF Plantation, United States	25,000	Clay	(Chinese Taipei) Hsieh Yu-chieh	(Belarus) Olga Govortsova (United States) Jada Robinson	6–1, 6–4
Win	14–20	Jun 2019	ITF Daegu, South Korea	25,000	Hard	(Chinese Taipei) Hsieh Yu-chieh	(South Korea) Choi Ji-hee (South Korea) Han Na-lae	6–3, 7–6^{(5)}
Win	15–20	Nov 2019	ITF Sharm El Sheikh, Egypt	15,000	Hard	(Romania) Ana Bianca Mihăilă	(United Kingdom) Aleksandra Pitak (United Kingdom) Katarzyna Pitak	6–2, 6–4
Win	16–20	Dec 2019	ITF Navi Mumbai, India	25,000	Hard	(Chinese Taipei) Wu Fang-hsien	(Russia) Olga Doroshina (Russia) Shalimar Talbi	6–2, 6–2
Win	17–20	Feb 2022	ITF Sharm El Sheikh	W15	Hard	(Chinese Taipei) Lee Ya-hsin	(Finland) Laura Hietaranta (Greece) Michaela Laki	6–2, 3–6, [10–7]
Win	18–20	Feb 2022	ITF Sharm El Sheikh	W15	Hard	(Japan) Hiromi Abe	(Romania) Elena-Teodora Cadar (Hong Kong) Cody Wong	5–7, 7–5, [10–2]
Win	19–20	Mar 2022	ITF Sharm El Sheikh	W15	Hard	(Chinese Taipei) Lee Ya-hsin	(Russia) Polina Iatcenko (Russia) Darya Shauha	6–3, 6–0
Loss	19–21	Jul 2022	ITF Figueira da Foz, Portugal	W25+H	Hard	(Chinese Taipei) Wu Fang-hsien	(Australia) Alexandra Bozovic (Portugal) Francisca Jorge	2–6, 6–3, [10–12]
Win	20–21	Jul 2022	ITF Nottingham, United Kingdom	W25	Hard	(Chinese Taipei) Wu Fang-hsien	(Netherlands) Jasmijn Gimbrère (Netherlands) Isabelle Haverlag	6–3, 6–2
Loss	20–22	Oct 2022	Trnava Indoor, Slovakia	W60	Hard (i)	(Chinese Taipei) Wu Fang-hsien	(Russia) Sofya Lansere (Slovakia) Rebecca Šramková	6–4, 2–6, [9–11]
Loss	20–23	Oct 2022	ITF Loulé, Portugal	W25	Hard	(Chinese Taipei) Wu Fang-hsien	(Portugal) Francisca Jorge (Portugal) Matilde Jorge	3–6, 5–7
Win	21–23	Nov 2022	ITF Jerusalem, Israel	W25	Hard	(Georgia (country)) Sofia Shapatava	(Russia) Ekaterina Reyngold (Russia) Polina Kudermetova	6–2, 6–4
Loss	21–24	Dec 2022	ITF Lousada, Portugal	W15	Hard (i)	(Italy) Maria Vittoria Viviani	(Lithuania) Iveta Dapkutė (Sweden) Julita Saner	3–6, 6–4, [7–10]
Loss	21–25	Jan 2023	ITF Nonthaburi, Thailand	W40	Hard	(Indonesia) Jessy Rompies	(Chinese Taipei) Liang En-shuo (China) Ma Yexin	3–6, 6–2, [6–10]
Loss	21–26	Apr 2023	ITF Osaka, Japan	W25	Hard	(Chinese Taipei) Lee Ya-hsuan	(Australia) Alexandra Bozovic (Australia) Petra Hule	2–6, 3–6
