= Empire Women's Indoor =

- 2024 Empire Women's Indoor 2

ITF Women's Tour
- Event name: Empire Women's Indoor
- Location: Trnava, Slovakia
- Venue: TC Empire
- Category: ITF Women's World Tennis Tour
- Surface: Hard / Indoor
- Draw: 32S/32Q/16D
- Prize money: $60,000 / $40,000
- Website: www.tcempire.sk

The Empire Women's Indoor are a series of tournaments for professional female tennis players played on indoor hardcourts. The events are classified as $60,000 and $40,000 ITF Women's World Tennis Tour tournaments and have been held in Trnava, Slovakia, since 2015 (then $10,000).

== Past finals ==
=== Singles ===
Year	Champion	Runner-up	Score
2026 (2)	(Belgium) Hanne Vandewinkel	(Ukraine) Daria Snigur	7–6^{(7–1)}, 6–1
2026 (1)	(Czech Republic) Laura Samson	(Czech Republic) Lucie Havlíčková	6–4, 6–2
2025 (2)	(Switzerland) Valentina Ryser	(Czech Republic) Tereza Valentová	6–4, 3–6, 7–6^{(7–4)}
2025 (1)	(Croatia) Antonia Ružić	Elena Pridankina	6–2, 4–6, 6–3
2024 (4)	(Germany) Tatjana Maria	(United Kingdom) Jodie Burrage	6–4, 6–1
2024 (3)	(Croatia) Antonia Ružić	(Czech Republic) Tereza Valentová	6–3, 6–2
2024 (2)	(Netherlands) Suzan Lamens	(Switzerland) Céline Naef	6–2, 6–2
2024 (1)	Anastasiia Gureva	Elena Pridankina	3–6, 6–3, 6–4
2023 (3)	(Australia) Arina Rodionova	(France) Kristina Mladenovic	7–6^{(7–1)}, 5–7, 6–1
2023 (2)	(Czech Republic) Lucie Havlíčková	(France) Océane Dodin	3–6, 7–6^{(7–4)}, 7–5
2023 (1)	(Romania) Jaqueline Cristian	(France) Océane Dodin	7–6^{(9–7)}, 7–6^{(7–4)}
2022 (4)	(Croatia) Jana Fett	(Hungary) Natália Szabanin	6–3, 6–2
2022 (3)	(Belarus) Vera Lapko	(Czech Republic) Lucie Havlíčková	4–6, 7–6^{(7–1)}, 6–2
2022 (2)	(Germany) Eva Lys	(Slovakia) Anna Karolína Schmiedlová	6–2, 4–6, 6–2
2022 (1)	(United Kingdom) Katie Swan	(China) Wang Xinyu	6–1, 3–6, 6–4
2021	Tournament cancelled due to the COVID-19 pandemic		
2020 (2)	(Romania) Jaqueline Cristian	(Russia) Sofya Lansere	6–1, 4–2 ret.
2020 (1)	(Russia) Sofya Lansere	(North Macedonia) Lina Gjorcheska	6–2, 6–3
2019 (2)	(Bulgaria) Isabella Shinikova	(Czech Republic) Denisa Allertová	6–1, 6–3
2019 (1)	(Czech Republic) Lucie Hradecká	(Slovakia) Kristína Kučová	6–4, 3–6, 7–6^{(7–0)}
2018	(Moldova) Anastasia Dețiuc	(Russia) Sofya Lansere	5–7, 6–0, 6–3
2017	(Czech Republic) Pernilla Mendesová	(Slovakia) Michaela Hončová	6–2, 6–7^{(2–7)}, 7–6^{(7–4)}
2016	(Russia) Ekaterina Alexandrova	(Czech Republic) Karolína Muchová	6–1, 6–3
2015	(Latvia) Anastasija Sevastova	(Hungary) Réka Luca Jani	6–1, 7–6^{(7–3)}

=== Doubles ===
Year	Champions	Runners-up	Score
2026 (2)	(Czech Republic) Anna Sisková; Anastasia Tikhonova	(Spain) Aliona Bolsova (Spain) Yvonne Cavallé Reimers	6–1, 6–2
2026 (1)	(Australia) Olivia Gadecki; Anastasia Tikhonova	(Czech Republic) Aneta Kučmová (Czech Republic) Aneta Laboutková	6–3, 6–3
2025 (2)	(Netherlands) Isabelle Haverlag; Elena Pridankina	(Belgium) Magali Kempen (France) Jessika Ponchet	6–2, 6–3
2025 (1)	(Czech Republic) Jesika Malečková (Czech Republic) Miriam Škoch	(Switzerland) Céline Naef; Elena Pridankina	5–7, 6–3, [10–2]
2024 (4)	(United Kingdom) Madeleine Brooks (Netherlands) Isabelle Haverlag	(Czech Republic) Anastasia Dețiuc (Czech Republic) Aneta Kučmová	7–6^{(7–5)}, 6–1
2024 (3)	(Czech Republic) Dominika Šalková (Czech Republic) Julie Štruplová	(Turkey) İpek Öz (Croatia) Tara Würth	6–4, 6–4
2024 (2)	(Netherlands) Isabelle Haverlag (United States) Anna Rogers	(Chinese Taipei) Liang En-shuo (China) Tang Qianhui	6–3, 4–6, [12–10]
2024 (1)	(Switzerland) Lulu Sun (Japan) Moyuka Uchijima	(Poland) Weronika Falkowska (Hungary) Fanny Stollár	6–4, 7–6^{(7–3)}
2023 (3)	(Slovakia) Natália Kročková (Slovakia) Tereza Mihalíková	(France) Estelle Cascino (Czech Republic) Jesika Malečková	7–6^{(9–7)}, 7–5
2023 (2)	(United Kingdom) Alicia Barnett (United Kingdom) Olivia Nicholls	Amina Anshba (Czech Republic) Anastasia Dețiuc	6–3, 6–3
2023 (1)	(Belgium) Greet Minnen (Belgium) Yanina Wickmayer	(Greece) Sapfo Sakellaridi (Slovakia) Radka Zelníčková	6–4, 6–4
2022 (4)	(Russia) Ekaterina Makarova (France) Alice Robbe	(Slovakia) Katarína Kužmová (Czech Republic) Anna Sisková	6–3, 7–5
2022 (3)	(Croatia) Lea Bošković (Poland) Weronika Falkowska	(China) Lu Jiajing (Romania) Oana Georgeta Simion	7–6^{(9–7)}, 2–6, [10–6]
2022 (2)	(Russia) Sofya Lansere (Slovakia) Rebecca Šramková	(Chinese Taipei) Lee Pei-chi (Chinese Taipei) Wu Fang-hsien	4–6, 6–2, [11–9]
2022 (1)	(Georgia (country)) Mariam Bolkvadze (United Kingdom) Maia Lumsden	(Latvia) Diāna Marcinkēviča (Switzerland) Conny Perrin	6–2, 6–3
2021	Tournament cancelled due to the COVID-19 pandemic		
2020 (2)	(Hungary) Anna Bondár (Slovakia) Tereza Mihalíková	(Russia) Amina Anshba (Czech Republic) Anastasia Dețiuc	6–4, 6–4
2020 (1)	(Czech Republic) Miriam Kolodziejová (Romania) Laura Ioana Paar	(Russia) Victoria Kan (Ukraine) Ganna Poznikhirenko	6–1, 6–1
2019 (2)	(Romania) Laura Ioana Paar (Czech Republic) Anastasia Zarycká	(Poland) Maja Chwalińska (Czech Republic) Miriam Kolodziejová	6–4, 6–3
2019 (1)	(Romania) Elena Bogdan (Bulgaria) Elitsa Kostova	(Slovakia) Michaela Hončová (Ukraine) Ganna Poznikhirenko	7–5, 7–6^{(7–5)}
2018	(Poland) Paulina Czarnik (Poland) Daria Kuczer	(Moldova) Anastasia Dețiuc (Czech Republic) Johana Marková	6–3, 7–5
2017	(Germany) Vivian Heisen (Russia) Margarita Lazareva	(Slovakia) Sandra Jamrichová (Slovakia) Vivien Juhászová	4–6, 6–4, [10–7]
2016	(Hungary) Réka Luca Jani (Slovakia) Chantal Škamlová	(Slovakia) Lenka Juríková (Czech Republic) Tereza Malíková	6–3, 2–6, [10–7]
2015	(Austria) Anna Maria Heil (Latvia) Anastasija Sevastova	(Slovakia) Michaela Hončová (Slovakia) Lenka Juríková	6–4, 6–3
