= Eva Lys =

Professional german tennis player and social media influencer

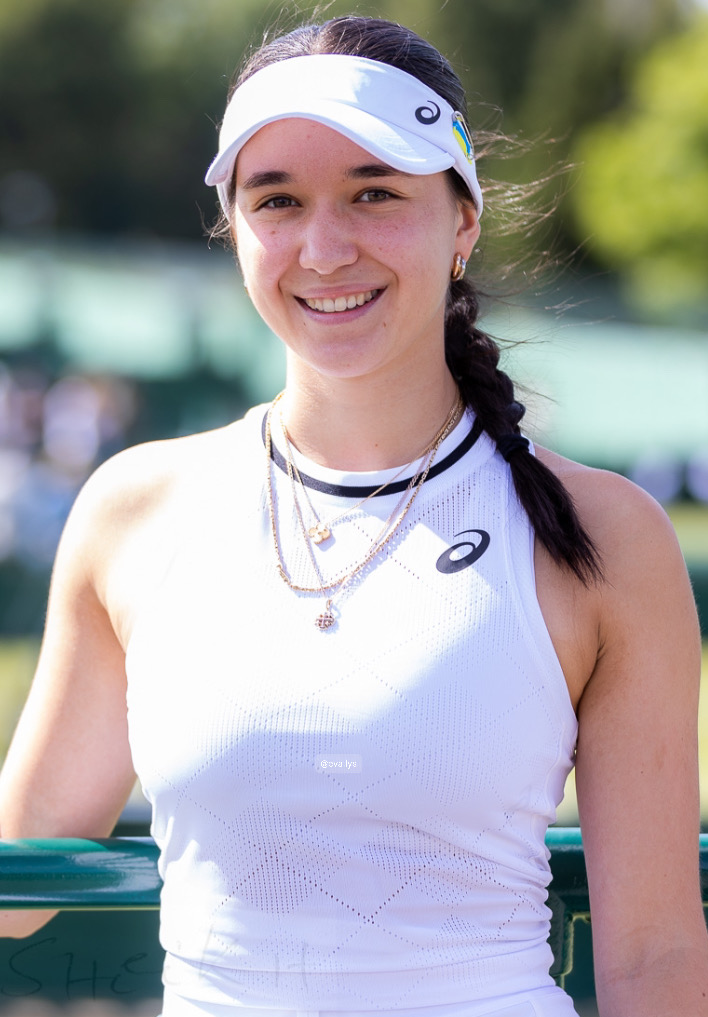
- Lys at the 2024 Wimbledon qualifying
- Country (sports): Germany
- Born: 12 January 2002 (age 24) Kyiv, Ukraine
- Height: 1.65 m (5 ft 5 in)
- Plays: Right-handed (two-handed backhand)
- Prize money: US $2,330,752

Singles
- Career record: 181–125
- Career titles: 3 ITF
- Highest ranking: No. 39 (5 January 2026)
- Current ranking: No. 102 (28 September 2026)

Grand Slam singles results
- Australian Open: 4R (2025)
- French Open: 2R (2025, 2026)
- Wimbledon: 2R (2025)
- US Open: 2R (2023, 2025, 2026)

Doubles
- Career record: 4–13
- Career titles: 0
- Highest ranking: No. 768 (28 November 2022)
- Current ranking: No. 1100 (25 May 2026)

Grand Slam doubles results
- Australian Open: 1R (2026)
- French Open: 1R (2025, 2026)
- Wimbledon: 1R (2025)

Team competitions
- BJK Cup: RR (2023), 1R (2024)
- Last updated on: 27 May 2026.

Eva Lys (German pronunciation: [ˈeːfa ˈlyːs]; born 12 January 2002) is a German professional tennis player and social media influencer. Lys reached a career-high singles ranking of world No. 39 on 5 January 2026. She is the current No. 3 German singles player.

== Personal life ==
She was born in Kyiv, Ukraine, and moved to Germany at the age of 2. Her father Vladimir is a former tennis player who was a member of the Ukraine Davis Cup team, and currently is a coach in Hamburg. Lys' older sister Lisa Matviyenko is also a tennis player. She went to school at the Sportgymnasium Alter Teichweg in Hamburg, from where Marvin Möller and Carina Witthöft also graduated. She still has family in Ukraine, and after the Russian invasion of Ukraine she criticized some Russian players' "disrespectful" behaviour. She lives with a rheumatic autoimmune disease (spondylarthritis) and manages her schedule to accommodate its effects.

== Career ==
=== 2021–2022: WTA Tour debut ===
Lys made her WTA Tour main-draw debut at the Hamburg European Open when she received a wildcard into the doubles draw, partnering Noma Noha Akugue. They lost to Mona Barthel and Mandy Minella in the first round.

Lys made her WTA Tour singles debut at the 2022 Porsche Tennis Grand Prix in Stuttgart, coming through the qualifying. She beat Viktorija Golubic in the first round, before losing to world No. 1, Iga Świątek, in the second.

=== 2023–24: Major debut, three WTA semifinals, top 105 ===
Lys made her major debut at the Australian Open, losing in the first round to Cristina Bucșa in three sets.

Having qualified for the main draw, she recorded her first win in a major at the 2023 US Open on her debut there over wildcard Robin Montgomery. She lost in the second round to Lucia Bronzetti.

Lys reached her first WTA Tour semifinal at the 2023 Transylvania Open in Cluj-Napoca, Romania, but lost to eventual champion, fellow German Tamara Korpatsch.

In July, she qualified for the Wimbledon Championships making her debut at this major although she went out in the opening round to Clara Burel. In mid-July, Lys reached her second WTA Tour semifinal at the 2024 Budapest Grand Prix with wins over sixth seed Nadia Podoroska, Bernarda Pera and finally Rebecca Šramková in the quarterfinals before losing to top seed Diana Shnaider. As a result she reached a new career-high WTA singles ranking of world No. 108 on 22 July 2024.

Ranked No. 113, she also qualified for the main draw of the US Open for a second consecutive year, and lost in the first round in a close three-setter to Marie Bouzková. At the 2024 Jasmin Open, Lys reached her fourth career quarterfinal, defeating Lesia Tsurenko and upsetting top seed and two-time defending champion Elise Mertens, her fourth career top 50 win, following a comeback from 1–6, 0–2 and 15–40 to win in three sets. Next she defeated Zeynep Sönmez to reach her third WTA Tour semifinal, which she lost to Sonay Kartal when she retired due to illness, while trailing in the first set. As a result, she reached No. 105 in the singles rankings on 23 September 2024.

=== 2025–26: Major fourth round, top 10 win, top 50, Spondyloarthritis ===
Having lost in qualifying, Lys gained entry into the Australian Open main draw as a lucky loser, after 13th seed Anna Kalinskaya withdrew just minutes before her match with qualifier Kimberly Birrell was due to start. Lys took advantage of her second-chance opportunity by defeating Birrell in straight sets. Lys then overcame Varvara Gracheva to reach the third round. Next, Lys defeated Jaqueline Cristian in three sets to make a major fourth round for the first time and in the process becoming the first lucky loser to reach the women's singles fourth round and only the sixth to make the last 16 of any major in the Open Era. She was then eliminated by second seed Iga Świątek in straight sets winning only one game.

At the WTA 1000 Dubai Championships, she qualified for the main draw and defeated Irina-Camelia Begu for her first WTA 1000 win. Lys lost to defending champion and fourth seed Jasmine Paolini in the second round. Despite this she moved into the top 80 at world No. 77 in the singles rankings on 24 February 2025, becoming the German No. 1 player. In Indian Wells where she was making her debut, she entered the main draw again as a lucky loser directly into the second round, after the late withdrawal of 11th seed Paula Badosa, who had a first round bye. Lys lost to wildcard entrant Caroline Dolehide.

She defeated 28th seed Peyton Stearns at the French Open, before losing to qualifier Victoria Mboko in the second round. It was a similar story at Wimbledon where she overcame Yue Yuan only to lose to 30th seed Linda Nosková in round two.

Moving onto the North American hardcourt swing of the season, Lys reached the third round at the WTA 1000 Canadian Open, recording wins over qualifier Leolia Jeanjean and 27th seed Anastasia Pavlyuchenkova. Her run was ended by second seed Iga Świątek. At the Cincinnati Open she overcame wildcard entrant Bernarda Pera to make it into the second round, at which point she lost to sixth seed Madison Keys in three sets. Lys defeated third seed Maya Joint and Polina Kudermetova to reach her first WTA quarterfinal at Tennis in the Land. She withdrew from the tournament before her last eight match against Anastasia Zakharova saying she needed to rest to be ready for the following week's US Open.

At the 2025 US Open, Lys defeated qualifier Francesca Jones, before retiring while trailing by a set and two breaks of serve in her second round match with 21st seed Linda Nosková. At the 2025 China Open (tennis) Lys reached for the first time a WTA 1000 fourth round by recording also a first top-10 win over Elena Rybakina, achieving multiple firsts at the same time. Next she defeated McCartney Kessler to reach her first WTA 1000 quarterfinal and made the top 50 in the rankings on 6 October 2025.

In 2025, Eva Lys revealed she has had spondyloarthritis (a rheumatic autoimmune condition affecting her spine and joints) which she manages daily while continuing her professional career.

== Performance timeline ==
Key
| W | F | SF | QF | #R | RR | Q# | DNQ | A | NH |

(W) winner; (F) finalist; (SF) semifinalist; (QF) quarterfinalist; (#R) rounds 4, 3, 2, 1; (RR) round-robin stage; (Q#) qualification round; (DNQ) did not qualify; (A) absent; (NH) not held; (SR) strike rate (events won / competed); (W–L) win–loss record.
To avoid confusion and double counting, these charts are updated at the conclusion of a tournament or when the player's participation has ended.

=== Singles ===
Only WTA Tour (incl. Grand Slams) main-draw and Billie Jean King Cup results are considered in the career statistics.

Current through the 2026 WTA Tour.

| Tournament | 2022 | 2023 | 2024 | 2025 | 2026 | SR | W–L | Win% |
|---|---|---|---|---|---|---|---|---|
Grand Slam tournaments
| Australian Open | A | 1R | Q3 | 4R | 1R | 0 / 3 | 3–3 | 50% |
| French Open | A | Q1 | 1R | 2R | 2R | 0 / 3 | 2–3 | 40% |
| Wimbledon | Q1 | Q2 | 1R | 2R | 1R | 0 / 3 | 1–3 | 25% |
| US Open | Q3 | 2R | 1R | 2R | 2R | 0 / 4 | 3–4 | 43% |
| Win–loss | 0–0 | 1–2 | 0–3 | 6–4 | 2–4 | 0 / 13 | 9–13 | 41% |
National representation
| BJK Cup | PO | RR | 1R | PO | A | 0 / 2 | 1–2 | 33% |
WTA 1000 tournaments
| Dubai Open | NTI | A | Q2 | 2R | A | 0 / 1 | 1–1 | 50% |
| Indian Wells Open | A | Q2 | A | 2R | A | 0 / 1 | 0–1 | 0% |
| Miami Open | A | Q2 | A | Q2 | 1R | 0 / 1 | 0–1 | 0% |
| Madrid Open | A | Q1 | A | 2R | 1R | 0 / 2 | 1–2 | 33% |
| Italian Open | A | A | A | 2R | 2R | 0 / 2 | 2–2 | 50% |
| Canadian Open | A | A | A | 3R | 1R | 0 / 2 | 2–2 | 50% |
| Cincinnati Open | A | A | A | 2R | 1R | 0 / 2 | 1–2 | 33% |
| China Open | NH | 1R | A | QF | 1R | 0 / 3 | 4–3 | 57% |
| Win–loss | 0–0 | 0–1 | 0–0 | 10–7 | 1–6 | 0 / 14 | 11–14 | 44% |
Career statistics
| Tournaments | 3 | 7 | 7 | 19 | 16 | Career total: 52 | | |
| Hard win–loss | 1–0 | 6–7 | 5–3 | 17–12 | 3–9 | 0 / 29 | 32–31 | 51% |
| Clay win–loss | 2–3 | 2–1 | 4–3 | 3–5 | 3–5 | 0 / 17 | 14–17 | 45% |
| Grass win–loss | 0–0 | 0–0 | 0–1 | 1–2 | 1–3 | 0 / 6 | 2–6 | 25% |
| Overall win–loss | 3–3 | 8–8 | 9–7 | 21–19 | 7–17 | 0 / 52 | 48–54 | 47% |
| Win % | 50% | 50% | 56% | 53% | 29% | Career total: 47% | | |
| Year-end ranking | 123 | 130 | 130 | 40 | 177 | | | |

== ITF Circuit finals ==
=== Singles: 4 (3 titles, 1 runner-up) ===
| Legend W100 tournaments (0–1) W60 tournaments (1–0) W25 tournaments (2–0) | Finals by surface Hard (2–1) Clay (0–0) Carpet (1–0) |

| Result | W–L | Date | Tournament | Tier | Surface | Opponent | Score |
|---|---|---|---|---|---|---|---|
| Win | 1–0 | Mar 2020 | ITF Altenkirchen, Germany | W25 | Carpet (i) | (Netherlands) Bibiane Schoofs | 6–2, 6–4 |
| Win | 2–0 | Oct 2021 | ITF Istanbul, Turkey | W25 | Hard (i) | (Netherlands) Indy de Vroome | 6–3, 7–6^{(7–4)} |
| Win | 3–0 | Oct 2022 | ITF Trnava, Slovakia | W60 | Hard (i) | (Slovakia) Anna Karolína Schmiedlová | 6–2, 4–6, 6–2 |
| Loss | 3–1 | Nov 2022 | ITF Shrewsbury, United Kingdom | W100 | Hard (i) | (Czech Republic) Markéta Vondroušová | 5–7, 2–6 |

== Wins over top-10 players ==
Lys has a 1–11 win-loss record against players who were, at the time the match was played, ranked in the top 10.

| Season | 2025 | 2026 | Total |
|---|---|---|---|
| Wins | 1 | 0 | 1 |

| # | Player | Rk | Event | Surface | Rd | Score | Rk |
|---|---|---|---|---|---|---|---|
2025
| 1. | (Kazakhstan) Elena Rybakina | 10 | China Open, China | Hard | 3R | 6–3, 1–6, 6–4 | 66 |

== National participation ==
=== Billie Jean King Cup (1–2) ===
| Group membership Finals (0–1) Qualifying round (0–0) Play-offs (1–1) | Matches by type Singles (1–2) Doubles (0–0) |

| Date | Venue | Surface | Rd | Opponent nation | Score | Match type | Opponent player | W/L | Match score |
|---|---|---|---|---|---|---|---|---|---|
2022
| Nov 2022 | Rijeka | Hard (i) | PO | Croatia | 3–1 | Singles | Petra Martić | Win | 6–1, 6–4 |
2023
| Nov 2023 | Seville | Hard (i) | RR | Italy | 0–3 | Singles | Martina Trevisan | Loss | 6–7^{(6–8)}, 1–6 |
2025
| Nov 2025 | Ismaning | Hard (i) | PO | Turkey | 1–2 | Singles | Zeynep Sönmez | Loss | 2–6, 6–4, 0–6 |

=== United Cup (1–1) ===
| Venue | Surface | Rd | Opponent nation | Score | Match type | Opponent player(s) | W/L | Match score |
|---|---|---|---|---|---|---|---|---|
2026
| Sydney | Hard | RR | Netherlands | 3–0 | Singles | Suzan Lamens | Win | 6–2, 6–2 |
| Sydney | Hard | RR | Poland | 0–3 | Singles | Iga Świątek | Loss | 6–3, 3–6, 4–6 |
