= Natália Kročková =

Slovak tennis player

- Country (sports): Slovakia
- Born: 15 July 2008 (age 17)
- Plays: Left (two-handed backhand)
- Prize money: $14,177

Singles
- Career record: 20–30
- Highest ranking: No. 1053 (21 October 2024)
- Current ranking: No. 1151 (8 June 2026)

Doubles
- Career record: 19–19
- Career titles: 3 ITF
- Highest ranking: No. 554 (25 November 2024)
- Current ranking: No. 783 (8 June 2026)
- Last updated on: 8 June 2026.

Natália Kročková (born 15 July 2008) is a Slovak tennis player.

Kročková won her first bigger ITF title in the W60 doubles tournament at the 2023 Trnava Indoor in Slovakia.

== ITF Circuit finals ==
=== Doubles: 4 (3 titles, 1 runner-up) ===
Legend W60 tournaments (1–0) W15 tournaments (2–1)	Finals by surface Hard (1–0) Clay (2–1)

Result	W–L	Date	Tournament	Tier	Surface	Partner	Opponents	Score
Win	1–0	Nov 2023	Trnava Indoor, Slovakia	W60	Hard (i)	(Slovakia) Tereza Mihalíková	(France) Estelle Cascino (Czech Republic) Jesika Malečková	7–6^{(7)}, 7–5
Win	2–0	Jun 2024	ITF Kuršumlijska Banja, Serbia	W15	Clay	(Slovakia) Laura Cíleková	Victoria Borodulina; Ekaterina Kazionova	6–4, 5–7, [10–3]
Win	3–0	Jun 2025	ITF Mogyoród, Hungary	W15	Clay	(Czech Republic) Karolína Vlčková	(Slovakia) Nikola Daubnerová (Czech Republic) Linda Ševčíková	7–5, 6–3
Loss	3–1	Jul 2025	ITF Rogaška Slatina, Slovenia	W15	Clay	(Slovakia) Laura Cíleková	(Slovakia) Salma Drugdová (Poland) Daria Kuczer	2–6, 1–3 ret.
