= Lucie Havlíčková =

Czech tennis player (born 2005)

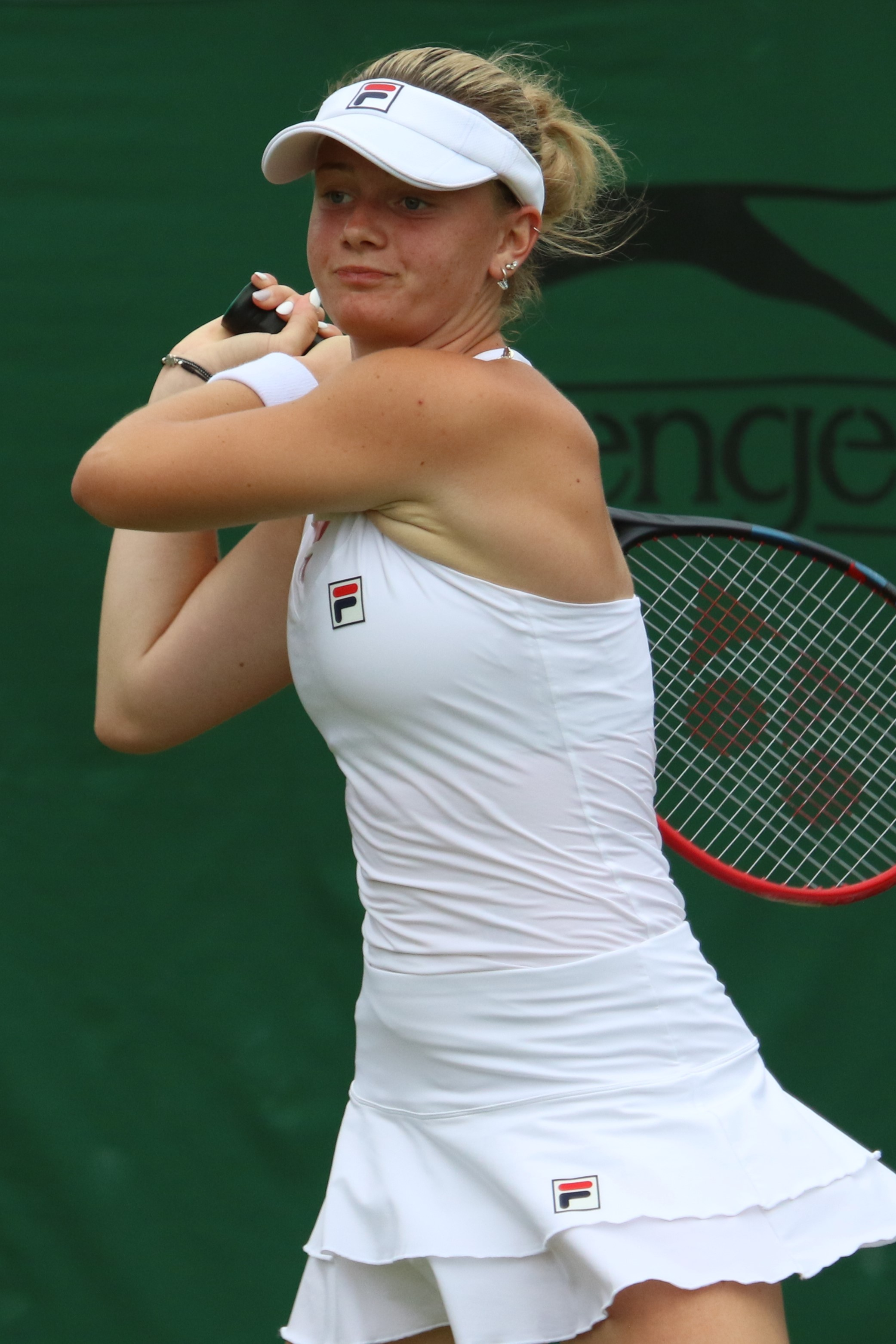
- Havlíčková at the 2023 Wimbledon Championships
- Country (sports): Czech Republic
- Born: 13 March 2005 (age 21) Prague, Czech Republic
- Height: 1.78 m (5 ft 10 in)
- Plays: Right (two-handed backhand)
- Prize money: US$ 406,744

Singles
- Career record: 143–88
- Career titles: 3 ITF
- Highest ranking: No. 181 (19 October 2026)
- Current ranking: No. 181 (19 October 2026)

Grand Slam singles results
- French Open: Q1 (2026)
- Wimbledon: Q1 (2023, 2026)
- US Open: 1R (2026)

Doubles
- Career record: 62–42
- Career titles: 1 WTA 125, 4 ITF
- Highest ranking: No. 101 (14 September 2026)
- Current ranking: No. 113 (19 October 2026)
- Last updated on: 24 October 2026.

Lucie Havlíčková (born 13 March 2005) is a Czech tennis player. She has career-high rankings by the WTA of No. 181 in singles, reached on 19 October 2026, and No. 101 in doubles, achieved on 14 September 2026.

Havlíčková made her WTA Tour main-draw debut at the 2021 Prague Open, where she received wildcards into the singles and doubles tournaments.

Havlíčková won both the 2022 French Open girls' singles and doubles titles.

== Career ==
=== Juniors ===
==== Grand Slam performance ====
Singles:

- Australian Open: 1R (2022)
- French Open: W (2022)
- Wimbledon: –
- US Open: F (2022)

Doubles:

- Australian Open: 2R (2022)
- French Open: W (2022)
- Wimbledon: –
- US Open: W (2022)

=== Professional ===
Havlíčková won her first professional title in March 2023 at the $60k Trnava Indoor tournament, defeating Océane Dodin in the final.

== National representation ==
Havlíčková was nominated for the Czech Republic Billie Jean King Cup team in 2025 with a 2–0 win-loss record in doubles.

== Performance timelines ==
Key
W	F	SF	QF	#R	RR	Q#	DNQ	A	NH

(W) winner; (F) finalist; (SF) semifinalist; (QF) quarterfinalist; (#R) rounds 4, 3, 2, 1; (RR) round-robin stage; (Q#) qualification round; (DNQ) did not qualify; (A) absent; (NH) not held; (SR) strike rate (events won / competed); (W–L) win–loss record.
To avoid confusion and double counting, these charts are updated at the conclusion of a tournament or when the player's participation has ended.

Only main-draw results in WTA Tour, Grand Slam tournaments, Billie Jean King Cup, United Cup, Hopman Cup and Olympic Games are included in win–loss records.

=== Singles ===
Current through the 2026 US Open.

Tournament	2021	2022	2023	2024	2025	2026	SR	W–L	W–L
Grand Slam tournaments
Australian Open	A	A	A	A	A	A	0 / 0	0–0	–
French Open	A	A	A	A	A	Q1	0 / 0	0–0	–
Wimbledon	A	A	Q1	A	A	Q1	0 / 0	0–0	–
US Open	A	A	Q1	A	A	1R	0 / 1	0–1	0%
Win–Loss	0–0	0–0	0–0	0–0	0–0	0–1	0 / 1	0–1	0%
Career statistics
Tournaments	1	1	1	0	1	3	Career total: 7		
Overall Win–Loss	0–1	1–1	0–1	0–0	1–1	1–3	0 / 7	3–7	30%
Year-end ranking (Note: 2020: WTA ranking 783)	1167	383	243	584			$258,294		

=== Doubles ===
Current through the 2026 US Open.

Tournament	2021	2022	...	2025	2026	SR	W–L	W–L
Grand Slam tournaments
Australian Open	A	A		A	A	0 / 0	0–0	–
French Open	A	A		A	A	0 / 0	0–0	–
Wimbledon	A	A		A	A	0 / 0	0–0	–
US Open	A	A		A	A	0 / 0	0–0	–
Win–Loss	0–0	0–0		0–0	0–0	0 / 0	0–0	–
Career statistics
Tournaments	1	1		1	2	Career total: 5		
Titles	0	0		0	0	Career total: 0		
Finals	0	0		1	2	Career total: 3		
Overall Win–Loss	0–1	1–1		4–1	5–2	0 / 5	10–5	67%
Year-end ranking	842	370						

== WTA Tour finals ==
=== Doubles: 3 (3 runner-ups) ===
Legend WTA 250 (0–3)	Finals by surface Hard (0–3)	Finals by setting Outdoor (0–2) Indoor (0–1)

Result	W–L	Date	Tournament	Tier	Surface	Partner	Opponents	Score
Loss	0–1	Jul 2025	Prague Open, Czech Republic	WTA 250	Hard	(Czech Republic) Laura Samson	(Japan) Makoto Ninomiya (Ukraine) Nadiya Kichenok	6–1, 4–6, [7–10]
Loss	0–2	Feb 2026	Ostrava Open, Czech Republic	WTA 250	Hard (i)	(Czech Republic) Dominika Šalková	(Czech Republic) Anastasia Dețiuc (United States) Sabrina Santamaria	4–6, 6–7^{(4–7)}
Loss	0–3	Jul 2026	Prague Open, Czech Republic	WTA 250	Hard	(Czech Republic) Laura Samson	(United Kingdom) Harriet Dart (United Kingdom) Maia Lumsden	4–6, 4–6

== WTA 125 finals ==
=== Doubles: 1 title ===
Result	Date	Tournament	Surface	Partner	Opponents	Score
Win	Sep 2026	Montreux Open, Switzerland	Clay	(Argentina) Nicole Fossa Huergo	(France) Estelle Cascino (China) Feng Shuo	6–3, 6–7^{(4–7)}, [10–8]

== ITF Circuit finals ==
=== Singles: 10 (3 titles, 7 runner-ups) ===
Legend W60/75 tournaments (1–4) W50 tournaments (1–0) W25/35 tournaments (0–3) W15 tournaments (1–0)	Finals by surface Hard (2–4) Clay (1–3)

Result	W–L	Date	Tournament	Tier	Surface	Opponent	Score
Loss	0–1	Oct 2022	Trnava Indoor, Slovakia	W25	Hard (i)	Vera Lapko	6–4, 6–7^{(1–7)}, 2–6
Win	1–1	Mar 2023	Trnava Indoor 2, Slovakia	W60	Hard (i)	(France) Océane Dodin	3–6, 7–6^{(7–4)}, 7–5
Loss	1–2	May 2023	Grado Tennis Cup, Italy	W60	Clay	Yuliya Hatouka	6–2, 3–6, 1–6
Loss	1–3	Apr 2024	ITF Santa Margherita di Pula, Italy	W35	Clay	(Ukraine) Anastasiya Soboleva	5–7, 3–6
Loss	1–4	Apr 2024	ITF Santa Margherita di Pula, Italy	W35	Clay	(Turkey) Ayla Aksu	w/o
Win	2–4	Jun 2025	ITF Mogyoród, Hungary	W15	Clay	(Switzerland) Katerina Tsygourova	6–2, 7–5
Loss	2–5	Sep 2025	Bratislava Open, Slovakia	W75	Hard (i)	Alina Korneeva	6–7^{(7–9)}, 5–7
Win	3–5	Nov 2025	Trnava Indoor 3, Slovakia	W50	Hard (i)	(Bulgaria) Elizara Yaneva	6–4, 3–6, 7–6^{(7–3)}
Loss	3–6	Nov 2025	Trnava Indoor 4, Slovakia	W75	Hard (i)	(Romania) Elena-Gabriela Ruse	7–5, 4–6, 0–6
Loss	3–7	Feb 2026	Trnava Indoor, Slovakia	W75	Hard (i)	(Czech Republic) Laura Samson	4–6, 2–6

=== Doubles: 8 (4 titles, 4 runner-ups) ===
Legend W100 tournaments (0–1) W60/75 tournaments (2–0) W40 tournaments (1–0) W25/35 tournaments (1–2) W15 tournaments (0–1)	Finals by surface Hard (4–0) Clay (0–3) Carpet (0–1)

Result	W–L	Date	Tournament	Tier	Surface	Partner	Opponents	Score
Loss	0–1	Apr 2021	ITF Antalya, Turkey	W15	Clay	(Czech Republic) Miriam Kolodziejová	(South Korea) Lee So-ra (Japan) Misaki Matsuda	2–6, 3–6
Loss	0–2	Dec 2021	ITF Jablonec nad Nisou, Czech Republic	W25	Carpet (i)	(Czech Republic) Linda Klimovičová	(Poland) Maja Chwalińska (Canada) Katherine Sebov	5–7, 4–6
Win	1–2	Jan 2023	ITF Tallinn, Estonia	W40	Hard (i)	(Czech Republic) Dominika Šalková	(Italy) Deborah Chiesa (Italy) Lisa Pigato	7–5, 4–6, [13–11]
Loss	1–3	Mar 2024	ITF Santa Margherita di Pula, Italy	W35	Clay	(Serbia) Lola Radivojević	(Greece) Sapfo Sakellaridi (Italy) Aurora Zantedeschi	4–6, 2–6
Win	2–3	Sep 2025	Slovak Open, Slovakia	W75	Hard (i)	(United Kingdom) Lily Miyazaki	(Poland) Martyna Kubka (Czech Republic) Aneta Laboutková	3–6, 6–3, [11–9]
Win	3–3	Nov 2025	ITF Liberec, Czech Republic	W35	Hard (i)	(Croatia) Lucija Ćirić Bagarić	(Czech Republic) Denisa Hindová (Czech Republic) Alena Kovačková	6–1, 6–1
Win	4–3	Mar 2026	ITF Murska Sobota, Slovenia	W75	Hard (i)	(Czech Republic) Laura Samson	(United States) Rasheeda McAdoo (United States) Alana Smith	w/o
Loss	4–4	Apr 2026	Wiesbaden Open, Germany	W100	Clay	(Czech Republic) Anna Sisková	(Croatia) Lucija Ćirić Bagarić (Slovenia) Nika Radišić	7–6, 6–7^{(3–7)}, [5–10]

== ITF Junior Circuit ==
=== Grand Slam tournaments ===
==== Singles: 2 (1 title, 1 runner-up) ====
Result	Year	Tournament	Surface	Opponent	Score
Win	2022	French Open	Clay	(Argentina) Solana Sierra	6–3, 6–3
Loss	2022	US Open	Hard	(Philippines) Alexandra Eala	2–6, 4–6

==== Doubles: 2 (2 titles) ====
Result	Year	Tournament	Surface	Partner	Opponents	Score
Win	2022	French Open	Clay	(Czech Republic) Sára Bejlek	(Czech Republic) Nikola Bartůňková (Switzerland) Céline Naef	6–3, 6–3
Win	2022	US Open	Hard	Diana Shnaider	(Germany) Carolina Kuhl (Germany) Ella Seidel	6–3, 6–2

=== ITF Junior Circuit finals ===
==== Singles: 13 (8 titles, 5 runner-ups) ====
Legend
Grade A (2–2)
Grade 1 / B1 (0–1)
Grade 2 (1–0)
Grade 3 (2–1)
Grade 4 (2–1)
Grade 5 (1–0)

Result	W–L	Date	Tournament	Tier	Surface	Opponent	Score
Win	1–0	Aug 2019	ITF Slovenská Ľupča, Slovakia	Grade 5	Clay	(United Kingdom) Ranah Stoiber	6–3, 6–1
Win	2–0	Feb 2020	ITF Oberhaching, Germany	Grade 3	Hard	(Russia) Elizaveta Shebekina	6–4, 6–3
Loss	2–1	Feb 2020	ITF Esch, Luxembourg	Grade 4	Hard	(Germany) Nicole Rivkin	4–6, 4–6
Win	3–1	Sep 2020	ITF Prague, Czech Republic	Grade 4	Clay	(Czech Republic) Dominika Šalková	3–6, 6–3, 6–1
Loss	3–2	Nov 2020	ITF Istanbul, Turkey	Grade 3	Hard	(Russia) Anastasiia Gureva	6–2, 3–6, 4–6
Win	4–2	Nov 2020	ITF Sobota, Poland	Grade 3	Hard	(Belgium) Hanne Vandewinkel	6–2, 7–5
Win	5–2	May 2021	ITF Oradea, Romania	Grade 2	Clay	(Czech Republic) Sára Bejlek	6–3, 6–3
Win	6–2	Nov 2021	ITF Pszczyna, Poland	Grade 4	Hard	(Poland) Zuzanna Bednarz	5–7, 6–3, 6–0
Win	7–2	Feb 2022	ITF Criciúma, Brazil	Grade A	Clay	(Canada) Annabelle Xu	6–2, 6–2
Loss	7–3	Apr 2022	ITF Vrsar, Croatia	Grade 1	Clay	(Belgium) Sofia Costoulas	2–6, 2–6
Loss	7–4	May 2022	ITF Offenbach, Germany	Grade A	Clay	(Belgium) Sofia Costoulas	4–6, 2–6
Win	8–4	Jun 2022	French Open, France	Grade A	Clay	(Argentina) Solana Sierra	6–3, 6–3
Loss	8–5	Sep 2022	US Open, United States	Grade A	Hard	(Philippines) Alexandra Eala	2–6, 4–6

==== Doubles: 13 (9 titles, 4 runner-ups) ====
Legend
Grade A (3–0)
Grade 1 / B1 (0–1)
Grade 2 (3–1)
Grade 3 (0–0)
Grade 4 (3–2)

Result	W–L	Date	Tournament	Tier	Surface	Partner	Opponents	Score
Loss	0–1	Aug 2019	|ITF Žilina, Slovakia	Grade 4	Clay	(Czech Republic) Tereza Dejnozková	(Slovakia) Nikola Daubnerová (Czech Republic) Amelie Smejkalová	1–6, 6–7^{(4–7)}
Win	1–1	Sep 2019	ITF Prague, Czech Republic	Grade 2	Clay	(Czech Republic) Sára Bejlek	(Russia) Julia Avdeeva (Russia) Alina Shcherbinina	6–2, 6–2
Win	2–1	Feb 2020	ITF Warsaw, Poland	Grade 4	Hard	(Czech Republic) Patricie Kubikova	(Slovakia) Anika Jaskova (United States) Michelle Tikhonko	6–3, 6–1
Win	3–1	Feb 2020	ITF Esch, Luxembourg	Grade 4	Hard	(Czech Republic) Kristyna Tomajkova	(Germany) Deborah Muratovic (Germany) Mila Stanojevic	2–6, 6–4, [10–8]
Loss	3–2	Sep 2020	ITF Prague, Czech Republic	Grade 4	Clay	(Czech Republic) Sára Bejlek	(Czech Republic) Nelly Knezkova (Czech Republic) Dominika Šalková	6–0, 1–6, [10–12]
Loss	3–3	Mar 2021	ITF Santo Domingo, Dominican Republic	Grade 2	Hard	(Sweden) Klara Milicevic	(Czech Republic) Brenda Fruhvirtová (Czech Republic) Linda Fruhvirtová	4–6, 3–6
Win	4–3	May 2021	ITF Oradea, Romania	Grade 2	Clay	(Czech Republic) Sára Bejlek	(Romania) Fatima Ingrid Amartha Keita (Slovakia) Sara Suchankova	6–4, 6–2
Win	5–3	May 2021	ITF Winkel, Germany	Grade 2	Clay	(Czech Republic) Linda Klimovičová	(Belgium) Tilwith Di Girolami (Belgium) Amelie Van Impe	6–4, 2–6, [18–16]
Loss	5–4	Oct 2021	ITF Vrsar, Croatia	Grade 1	Clay	(Croatia) Lucija Ćirić Bagarić	(Czech Republic) Brenda Fruhvirtová (Czech Republic) Barbora Palicová	6–3, 3–6, [7–10]
Win	6–4	Nov 2021	ITF Pszczyna, Poland	Grade 4	Hard	(Czech Republic) Katrin Pavkova	(Poland) Laura Koralnik (Poland) Sonia Pieczynska	7–6^{(7–4)}, 6–2
Win	7–4	May 2022	ITF Offenbach, Germany	Grade A	Clay	(Belgium) Sofia Costoulas	(Chinese Taipei) Li Yu-yun (Japan) Sara Saito	6–4, 6–4
Win	8–4	Jun 2022	French Open, France	Grade A	Clay	(Czech Republic) Sára Bejlek	(Czech Republic) Nikola Bartůňková (Switzerland) Céline Naef	6–3, 6–3
Win	9–4	Sep 2022	US Open, United States	Grade A	Hard	Diana Shnaider	(Germany) Carolina Kuhl (Germany) Ella Seidel	6–3, 6–2
