= 2024 Pirulo Cup Pazardzhik =

Tennis tournament

- Date: 16–22 September 2024
- Edition: 3rd
- Category: ITF Women's World Tennis Tour
- Prize money: $60,000
- Surface: Clay / Outdoor
- Location: Pazardzhik, Bulgaria

Champions

Singles
- (Germany) Ella Seidel

Doubles
- (Slovenia) Veronika Erjavec / (Bosnia and Herzegovina) Anita Wagner
← 2023 ·	Pazardzhik Cup	· 2025 →

The 2024 Pirulo Cup Pazardzhik was a professional tennis tournament played on outdoor clay courts. It was the third edition of the tournament, which was part of the 2024 ITF Women's World Tennis Tour. It took place in Pazardzhik, Bulgaria, between 16 and 22 September 2024.

== Champions ==
=== Singles ===
- (Germany) Ella Seidel def. (Germany) Caroline Werner, 6–1, 6–4

=== Doubles ===
- (Slovenia) Veronika Erjavec / (Bosnia and Herzegovina) Anita Wagner def. (Bulgaria) Lia Karatancheva / (Greece) Sapfo Sakellaridi, 7–5, 3–6, [10–5]

== Singles main draw entrants ==
=== Seeds ===
Country	Player	Rank	Seed
LAT	Darja Semeņistaja	125	1
AUS	Astra Sharma	139	2
GER	Ella Seidel	141	3
	Ekaterina Makarova	162	4
UKR	Katarina Zavatska	170	5
ESP	Leyre Romero Gormaz	171	6
AND	Victoria Jiménez Kasintseva	181	7
SLO	Veronika Erjavec	194	8

- Rankings are as of 9 September 2024.

=== Other entrants ===
The following players received wildcards into the singles main draw:

- (Bulgaria) Rositsa Dencheva
- (Bulgaria) Lia Karatancheva
- (Ukraine) Yelyzaveta Kotliar
- (Germany) Mia Mack

The following players received entry from the qualifying draw:

- Amina Anshba
- (Czech Republic) Michaela Bayerlová
- (Bulgaria) Lidia Encheva
- (Bulgaria) Denislava Glushkova
- (Romania) Gabriela Lee
- (Romania) Andreea Prisăcariu
- (Serbia) Mia Ristić
- (Germany) Caroline Werner

The following player received entry as a lucky loser:

- (Bulgaria) Dia Evtimova
