= 2025 Hamburg Open =

- Date: 18–24 May (men); 14–20 July (women)
- Edition: 119th (men); 23rd (women)
- Category: ATP 500 (men); WTA 250 (women)
- Draw: 32S / 16D
- Prize money: €2,158,560 (men) €275,094 (women)
- Surface: Clay
- Location: Hamburg, Germany
- Venue: Am Rothenbaum

Champions

Men's singles
- (Italy) Flavio Cobolli

Women's singles
- (France) Loïs Boisson

Men's doubles
- (Italy) Simone Bolelli / (Italy) Andrea Vavassori

Women's doubles
- (Ukraine) Nadiia Kichenok / (Japan) Makoto Ninomiya
← 2024 ·	Hamburg Open	· 2026 →

The 2025 Hamburg Open was a combined men's and women's tennis tournament played on outdoor clay courts. It was the 119th edition of the event for the men and the 23rd edition for the women. The event is classified as an ATP Tour 500 tournament on the 2025 ATP Tour and as a WTA 250 tournament on the 2025 WTA Tour (a WTA 125 tournament the previous year). It took place at Am Rothenbaum in Hamburg, Germany between 18 and 24 May 2025 for the men, and between 14 and 20 July 2025 for the women.

== Champions ==
=== Men's singles ===
- (Italy) Flavio Cobolli def. Andrey Rublev, 6–2, 6–4

=== Women's singles ===
- (France) Loïs Boisson def. (Hungary) Anna Bondár, 7–5, 6–3

=== Men's doubles ===
- (Italy) Simone Bolelli / (Italy) Andrea Vavassori def. (Argentina) Andrés Molteni / (Brazil) Fernando Romboli, 6–4, 6–0

=== Women's doubles ===
- (Ukraine) Nadiia Kichenok / (Japan) Makoto Ninomiya def. (Hungary) Anna Bondár / (Netherlands) Arantxa Rus 6–4, 3–6, [11–9]

== ATP singles main draw entrants ==
=== Seeds ===
Country	Player	Rank	Seed
GER	Alexander Zverev	2	1
USA	Frances Tiafoe	16	2
	Andrey Rublev	17	3
ARG	Francisco Cerúndolo	18	4
ESP	Alejandro Davidovich Fokina	26	5
CAN	Félix Auger-Aliassime	27	6
USA	Brandon Nakashima	29	7
ARG	Sebastián Báez	33	8

- Rankings are as of 5 May 2025.

=== Other entrants ===
The following players received wildcards into the main draw:

- (Germany) Diego Dedura
- (Germany) Justin Engel
- (Germany) Jan-Lennard Struff
- (Germany) Alexander Zverev

The following players received entry from the qualifying draw:

- (Belgium) Raphaël Collignon
- (Croatia) Borna Gojo
- (United States) Aleksandar Kovacevic
- (Sweden) Elias Ymer

The following player received entry as a lucky loser:

- (Ukraine) Vitaliy Sachko

=== Withdrawals ===
- (France) Ugo Humbert → replaced by (Argentina) Tomás Martín Etcheverry
- (United States) Sebastian Korda → replaced by (Argentina) Camilo Ugo Carabelli
- (Czech Republic) Jakub Menšík → replaced by (Ukraine) Vitaliy Sachko
- (Italy) Lorenzo Musetti → replaced by (Argentina) Francisco Comesaña
- (United States) Tommy Paul → replaced by (China) Bu Yunchaokete
- (Denmark) Holger Rune → replaced by (Germany) Daniel Altmaier
- (Italy) Jannik Sinner → replaced by (Bosnia and Herzegovina) Damir Džumhur
- (Greece) Stefanos Tsitsipas → replaced by (Spain) Roberto Bautista Agut

== ATP doubles main draw entrants ==
=== Seeds ===
Country	Player	Country	Player	Rank	Seed
FIN	Harri Heliövaara	GBR	Henry Patten	7	1
GER	Kevin Krawietz	GER	Tim Pütz	11	2
ITA	Simone Bolelli	ITA	Andrea Vavassori	19	3
CRO	Nikola Mektić	NZL	Michael Venus	29	3

- Rankings are as of 5 May 2025.

=== Other entrants ===
The following pairs received wildcards into the doubles main draw:

- (Germany) Justin Engel / (Germany) Max Hans Rehberg
- (Germany) Andreas Mies / (Germany) Patrick Zahraj

The following pair received entry from the qualifying draw:

- (Netherlands) Sander Arends / (United Kingdom) Luke Johnson

=== Withdrawals ===
- (Argentina) Máximo González / (Argentina) Andrés Molteni → replaced by (Argentina) Andrés Molteni / (Brazil) Fernando Romboli
- (Spain) Marcel Granollers / (Argentina) Horacio Zeballos → replaced by (Belgium) Sander Gillé / (Poland) Jan Zieliński

== WTA singles main draw entrants ==
=== Seeds ===
Country	Player	Rank	Seed
	Ekaterina Alexandrova	17	1
UKR	Dayana Yastremska	42	2
GER	Tatjana Maria	45	3
~~GER~~	~~Eva Lys~~	~~61~~	~~4~~
FRA	Loïs Boisson	66	5
JPN	Moyuka Uchijima	72	6
HUN	Anna Bondár	75	7
EGY	Mayar Sherif	86	8

- Rankings are as of 30 June 2025.

=== Other entrants ===
The following players received wildcards into the main draw:

- Ekaterina Alexandrova
- (France) Loïs Boisson
- (Germany) Noma Noha Akugue
- (Germany) Nastasja Schunk

The following players received entry using a protected ranking:

- (Turkey) Berfu Cengiz
- (Slovenia) Kaja Juvan

The following players received entry from the qualifying draw:

- (Spain) Ariana Geerlings
- (Serbia) Aleksandra Krunić
- (Germany) Valentina Steiner
- Maria Timofeeva
- (Netherlands) Eva Vedder
- (Germany) Caroline Werner

The following players received entry as lucky losers:

- (Italy) Nicole Fossa Huergo
- (Burundi) Sada Nahimana

=== Withdrawals ===
- (Spain) Jéssica Bouzas Maneiro → replaced by (Australia) Astra Sharma
- (Spain) Cristina Bucșa → replaced by (Turkey) Berfu Cengiz
- (France) Elsa Jacquemot → replaced by (Burundi) Sada Nahimana
- (Germany) Eva Lys → replaced by (Italy) Nicole Fossa Huergo
- Polina Kudermetova → replaced by (Austria) Julia Grabher
- (Switzerland) Rebeka Masarova → replaced by (Germany) Jule Niemeier
- (Kazakhstan) Yulia Putintseva → replaced by (Croatia) Tara Würth
- (Croatia) Antonia Ružić → replaced by (Austria) Sinja Kraus
- (Germany) Ella Seidel → replaced by (United States) Louisa Chirico
- (Germany) Laura Siegemund → replaced by (Germany) Tamara Korpatsch
- (China) Wang Xinyu → replaced by (Cyprus) Raluca Șerban

== WTA doubles main draw entrants ==
=== Seeds ===
Country	Player	Country	Player	Rank	Seed
UKR	Nadiia Kichenok	JPN	Makoto Ninomiya	111	1
CZE	Jesika Malečková	CZE	Miriam Škoch	185	2
JPN	Moyuka Uchijima	CHN	Zheng Saisai	191	3
KAZ	Zhibek Kulambayeva	GBR	Maia Lumsden	195	4

- Rankings are as of 30 June 2025.

=== Other entrants ===
The following pairs received wildcards into the doubles main draw:

- (Germany) Tessa Johanna Brockmann / (Germany) Sonja Zhenikhova
- (Germany) Noma Noha Akugue / (Germany) Nastasja Schunk
