= 2024 Hamburg Open – Women's doubles =

Women's doubles
- 2024 Hamburg Open

Final
- Champions: (Hungary) Anna Bondár (Belgium) Kimberley Zimmermann
- Runners-up: (Netherlands) Arantxa Rus (Serbia) Nina Stojanović
- Score: 5–7, 6–3, [11–9]

Events
Singles	men	women
Doubles	men	women
← 2023 ·	Hamburg Open	· 2025 →

Anna Bondár and Kimberley Zimmermann won the women's doubles title at the 2024 Hamburg Open, defeating Arantxa Rus and Nina Stojanović in the final, 5–7, 6–3, [11–9]. Bondár also defeated Rus in the singles final.

Anna Danilina and Alexandra Panova were the reigning champions, but Panova chose not to participate this year and Danilina chose to compete in Toronto instead.

== Seeds ==
1. (United Kingdom) Maia Lumsden / (Czech Republic) Anna Sisková (quarterfinals)
2. (Italy) Angelica Moratelli / (United States) Sabrina Santamaria (quarterfinals)

== Draw ==
Key

- Q = Qualifier
- WC = Wild card
- LL = Lucky loser
- Alt = Alternate
- ITF = ITF entry
- PR = Protected ranking
- SR = Special ranking
- SE = Special exempt
- JE = Junior exempt
- JR = Junior Accelerator Programme entrant
- CO = College Accelerator Programme entrant
- NG = Next Gen Accelerator Program entrant
- w/o = Walkover
- r = Retired
- d = Defaulted

=== Draw ===
Quarterfinals
1	(United Kingdom) M Lumsden (Czech Republic) A Sisková	6^{1}	0
(Hungary) A Bondár (Belgium) K Zimmermann	7^{7}	6
(Germany) V Heisen (Germany) T Korpatsch	1	4
(Czech Republic) A Dețiuc (Czech Republic) M Kolodziejová	6	6
(Netherlands) A Rus (Serbia) N Stojanović	6	6
(France) E Lechemia (United Kingdom) S Murray Sharan	4	3
WC	(Germany) N Noha Akugue (Germany) E Seidel	4	7^{7}	[10]
2	(Italy) A Moratelli (United States) S Santamaria	6	6^{4}	[2]

Semifinals
(Hungary) A Bondár (Belgium) K Zimmermann	2	6	[10]
(Czech Republic) A Dețiuc (Czech Republic) M Kolodziejová	6	1	[4]
(Netherlands) A Rus (Serbia) N Stojanović	6	6
WC	(Germany) N Noha Akugue (Germany) E Seidel	4	3

Final
(Hungary) A Bondár (Belgium) K Zimmermann	5	6	[11]
(Netherlands) A Rus (Serbia) N Stojanović	7	3	[9]
