= 2024 Hamburg Open =

- Date: 15–21 July (men); 4–10 August (women)
- Edition: 118th (men); 21st (women)
- Category: ATP 500 (men); WTA 125 (women)
- Draw: 32S / 16D
- Prize money: €1,891,995 (men) $115,000 (women)
- Surface: Clay
- Location: Hamburg, Germany
- Venue: Am Rothenbaum

Champions

Men's singles
- (France) Arthur Fils

Women's singles
- (Hungary) Anna Bondár

Men's doubles
- (Germany) Kevin Krawietz / (Germany) Tim Pütz

Women's doubles
- (Hungary) Anna Bondár / (Belgium) Kimberley Zimmermann
← 2023 ·	Hamburg Open	· 2025 →

The 2024 Hamburg Open was a combined men's and women's tennis tournament to be played on outdoor clay courts. It was the 118th edition of the event for the men and the 22nd edition for the women. The tournament was classified as an ATP Tour 500 series on the 2024 ATP Tour and as a 2024 WTA 125 tournament for a one-time only due to the ongoing 2024 Summer Olympics. The tournament took place at Am Rothenbaum in Hamburg, Germany between 15 and 21 July 2024 for the men, and between 4 and 10 August 2024 for the women.

== Champions ==
=== Men's singles ===
- (France) Arthur Fils def. (Germany) Alexander Zverev, 6–3, 3–6, 7–6^{(7–1)}

=== Women's singles ===
- (Hungary) Anna Bondár def. (Netherlands) Arantxa Rus, 6–4, 6–2

=== Men's doubles ===
- (Germany) Kevin Krawietz / (Germany) Tim Pütz def. (France) Fabien Reboul / (France) Édouard Roger-Vasselin, 7–6^{(10–8)}, 6–2

=== Women's doubles ===
- (Hungary) Anna Bondár / (Belgium) Kimberley Zimmermann def. (Netherlands) Arantxa Rus / (Serbia) Nina Stojanović, 5–7, 6–3, [11–9]

== ATP singles main draw entrants ==
=== Seeds ===
Country	Player	Rank	Seed
GER	Alexander Zverev	4	1
DEN	Holger Rune	15	2
ARG	Sebastián Báez	18	3
ARG	Francisco Cerúndolo	30	4
FRA	Arthur Fils	34	5
ITA	Matteo Arnaldi	35	6
ITA	Luciano Darderi	37	7
CHN	Zhang Zhizhen	38	8

- Rankings are as of 1 July 2024.

=== Other entrants ===
The following players received wildcards into the main draw:

- (Germany) Maximilian Marterer
- (Germany) Rudolf Molleker
- ~~(Germany) Henri Squire~~

The following player received entry using a protected ranking:

- (South Korea) Kwon Soon-woo

The following players received entry from the qualifying draw:

- (France) Ugo Blanchet
- (Netherlands) Jesper de Jong
- (Brazil) Felipe Meligeni Alves
- (Argentina) Marco Trungelliti

The following players received entry as lucky losers:

- (Argentina) Francisco Comesaña
- (Dominican Republic) Nick Hardt

=== Withdrawals ===
- (Spain) Alejandro Davidovich Fokina → replaced by (Argentina) Facundo Díaz Acosta
- (United Kingdom) Dan Evans → replaced by (South Korea) Kwon Soon-woo
- (France) Gaël Monfils → replaced by (Belgium) Zizou Bergs
- (France) Corentin Moutet → replaced by (France) Hugo Gaston
- (Italy) Lorenzo Musetti → replaced by (Germany) Dominik Koepfer
- (Italy) Lorenzo Sonego → replaced by (Dominican Republic) Nick Hardt
- (Germany) Henri Squire → replaced by (Argentina) Francisco Comesaña

== ATP doubles main draw entrants ==
=== Seeds ===
Country	Player	Country	Player	Rank	Seed
USA	Austin Krajicek	USA	Rajeev Ram	25	1
GER	Kevin Krawietz	GER	Tim Pütz	30	2
FRA	Fabien Reboul	FRA	Édouard Roger-Vasselin	46	3
AUS	Matthew Ebden	AUS	John Peers	52	4
BEL	Sander Gillé	BEL	Joran Vliegen	58	5
IND	Sriram Balaji	IND	Rohan Bopanna	68	6
GBR	Lloyd Glasspool	NED	Jean-Julien Rojer	71	7
AUT	Alexander Erler	AUT	Lucas Miedler	87	8

- Rankings are as of 1 July 2024.

=== Other entrants ===
The following pairs received wildcards into the doubles main draw:

- (Jamaica) Dustin Brown / (Germany) Daniel Masur
- (Germany) Dominik Koepfer / (Germany) Andreas Mies

The following pair received entry from the qualifying draw:

- (India) Jeevan Nedunchezhiyan (India) Vijay Sundar Prashanth

=== Withdrawals ===
- (Italy) Simone Bolelli / (Italy) Andrea Vavassori → replaced by (Austria) Alexander Erler / (Austria) Lucas Miedler
- (Argentina) Máximo González / (Argentina) Andrés Molteni → replaced by (Germany) Jakob Schnaitter / (Germany) Mark Wallner
- (Netherlands) Wesley Koolhof / (Croatia) Nikola Mektić → replaced by (Germany) Constantin Frantzen / (Germany) Hendrik Jebens
- (Brazil) Rafael Matos / (Brazil) Marcelo Melo → replaced by (Brazil) Thiago Seyboth Wild / (Kazakhstan) Alexander Shevchenko

== WTA singles main draw entrants ==
=== Seeds ===
Country	Player	Rank	Seed
EGY	Mayar Sherif	82	1
GER	Tamara Korpatsch	94	2
NED	Arantxa Rus	103	3
HUN	Anna Bondár	106	4
BRA	Laura Pigossi	110	5
SVK	Rebecca Šramková	111	6
GER	Eva Lys	112	7
CRO	Jana Fett	113	8

- Rankings are as of 29 July 2024.

=== Other entrants ===
The following players received wildcards into the main draw:

- (Germany) Tessa Brockmann
- (Germany) Carolina Kuhl
- (Germany) Julia Middendorf
- (Germany) Johanna Silva

The following players received entry from the qualifying draw:

- (Belgium) Marie Benoît
- (Germany) Anna Petkovic
- (Serbia) Dejana Radanović
- (Ukraine) Anastasiia Sobolieva

=== Withdrawals ===
- (Czech Republic) Sára Bejlek → replaced by (Ukraine) Kateryna Baindl
- (France) Fiona Ferro → replaced by (Croatia) Lea Bošković
- (Slovakia) Anna Karolína Schmiedlová → replaced by (Germany) Mona Barthel
- (Hungary) Panna Udvardy → replaced by (Greece) Despina Papamichail

== WTA doubles main draw entrants ==
=== Seeds ===
Country	Player	Country	Player	Rank	Seed
GBR	Maia Lumsden	CZE	Anna Sisková	139	1
ITA	Angelica Moratelli	USA	Sabrina Santamaria	165	2

- Rankings are as of 29 July 2024.

=== Other entrants ===
The following pair received a wildcard into the doubles main draw:

- (Germany) Noma Noha Akugue / (Germany) Ella Seidel
