= 2024 Pirulo Cup Pazardzhik – Doubles =

Doubles
- 2024 Pirulo Cup Pazardzhik

Final
- Champions: (Slovenia) Veronika Erjavec (Bosnia and Herzegovina) Anita Wagner
- Runners-up: (Bulgaria) Lia Karatancheva (Greece) Sapfo Sakellaridi
- Score: 7–5, 3–6, [10–5]

Events
Singles	Doubles
← 2023 ·	Pazardzhik Cup	· 2025 →

Cristina Dinu and Radka Zelníčková were the defending champions but chose not to participate.

Veronika Erjavec and Anita Wagner won the title, defeating Lia Karatancheva and Sapfo Sakellaridi in the final, 7–5, 3–6, [10–5].

== Seeds ==
1. Amina Anshba / Alevtina Ibragimova (semifinals)
2. (Germany) Ella Seidel / (Latvia) Darja Semeņistaja (semifinals)
3. (Slovenia) Veronika Erjavec / (Bosnia and Herzegovina) Anita Wagner (champions)
4. (Bulgaria) Lia Karatancheva / (Greece) Sapfo Sakellaridi (final)

== Draw ==
=== Key ===
- Q = Qualifier
- WC = Wild card
- LL = Lucky loser
- Alt = Alternate
- SE = Special exempt
- PR = Protected ranking
- ITF = ITF entry
- JE = Junior exempt
- w/o = Walkover
- r = Retired
- d = Defaulted
- SR = Special ranking

First round
1	A Anshba; A Ibragimova	1	7^{7}	[10]
(Belgium) M Benoît (United States) M Mateas	6	6^{4}	[8]
(Bulgaria) J Terziyska (Bulgaria) A Vangelova	6	1	[5]
(Czech Republic) M Bayerlová (Turkey) İ Yörük	1	6	[10]
3	(Slovenia) V Erjavec (Bosnia and Herzegovina) A Wagner	6	6
(Bulgaria) B Pawlowa-Dimitrova (Germany) C Werner	2	2
(United States) C Rosca (Australia) A Sharma	7^{7}	2	[10]
(Greece) D Papamichail (Cyprus) R Șerban	6^{4}	6	[6]
(Romania) A Prisăcariu (Switzerland) K Tsygourova	6	7
(Germany) M Mack (Germany) N Noha Akugue	4	5
(Bulgaria) D Glushkova (Germany) M Vogt	2	3
4	(Bulgaria) L Karatancheva (Greece) S Sakellaridi	6	6
(Bulgaria) B Spasova (Bulgaria) Z Vaneva	6	6
(Turkey) H Esen (Turkey) L Esen	3	2
(Bulgaria) D Evtimova (Romania) G Lee	2	5
2	(Germany) E Seidel (Latvia) D Semeņistaja	6	7

Quarterfinals
1	A Anshba; A Ibragimova	7	6
(Czech Republic) M Bayerlová (Turkey) İ Yörük	5	4
3	(Slovenia) V Erjavec (Bosnia and Herzegovina) A Wagner	2	6	[10]
(United States) C Rosca (Australia) A Sharma	6	2	[2]
(Romania) A Prisăcariu (Switzerland) K Tsygourova	1	3
4	(Bulgaria) L Karatancheva (Greece) S Sakellaridi	6	6
(Bulgaria) B Spasova (Bulgaria) Z Vaneva	1	0
2	(Germany) E Seidel (Latvia) D Semeņistaja	6	6

Semifinals
1	A Anshba; A Ibragimova	5	6	[5]
3	(Slovenia) V Erjavec (Bosnia and Herzegovina) A Wagner	7	3	[10]
4	(Bulgaria) L Karatancheva (Greece) S Sakellaridi	6	1	[10]
2	(Germany) E Seidel (Latvia) D Semeņistaja	3	6	[6]

Final
3	(Slovenia) V Erjavec (Bosnia and Herzegovina) A Wagner	7	3	[10]
4	(Bulgaria) L Karatancheva (Greece) S Sakellaridi	5	6	[5]
