= 2023 Hamburg European Open – Women's singles =

Women's singles
- 2023 Hamburg European Open

Final
- Champion: (Netherlands) Arantxa Rus
- Runner-up: (Germany) Noma Noha Akugue
- Score: 6–0, 7–6^{(7–3)}

Details
- Draw: 32
- Seeds: 8

Events
Singles	men	women
Doubles	men	women
← 2022 ·	Hamburg European Open	· 2024 →

Arantxa Rus defeated Noma Noha Akugue in the final, 6–0, 7–6^{(7–3)} to win the women's singles title at the 2023 Hamburg European Open. It was her first WTA Tour title. Rus, at 32 years of age, became the oldest first-time WTA champion in the last 40 years. She was playing in her 126th tour-level main-draw. It was Noha Akugue's first WTA Tour main draw singles appearance. The final was the first between two left-handed players since the 2018 Prague Open.

Bernarda Pera was the defending champion, but lost to Diana Shnaider in the quarterfinals.

== Seeds ==
1. (Croatia) Donna Vekić (first round)
2. (Egypt) Mayar Sherif (first round)
3. (United States) Bernarda Pera (quarterfinals)
4. (Italy) Jasmine Paolini (first round)
5. (Austria) Julia Grabher (second round)
6. (Kazakhstan) Yulia Putintseva (second round)
7. (Netherlands) Arantxa Rus (champion)
8. (Colombia) Camila Osorio (second round)

== Draw ==
Key

- Q = Qualifier
- WC = Wild card
- LL = Lucky loser
- Alt = Alternate
- ITF = ITF entry
- PR = Protected ranking
- SR = Special ranking
- SE = Special exempt
- JE = Junior exempt
- JR = Junior Accelerator Programme entrant
- CO = College Accelerator Programme entrant
- NG = Next Gen Accelerator Program entrant
- w/o = Walkover
- r = Retired
- d = Defaulted

=== Finals ===
Semifinals
WC	(Germany) Noma Noha Akugue	6	6
Diana Shnaider	3	3
Q	(Australia) Daria Saville	6	3	1
7	(Netherlands) Arantxa Rus	2	6	6

Final
WC	(Germany) Noma Noha Akugue	0	6^{3}
7	(Netherlands) Arantxa Rus	6	7^{7}

=== Top half ===
First round
1	(Croatia) D Vekić	6	3	3
(Australia) S Hunter	3	6	6
WC	(Germany) N Noha Akugue	7	6
(Brazil) L Pigossi	5	4
(Italy) M Trevisan	6	6
(United States) E Kalieva	1	0
K Rakhimova	4	3
8	(Colombia) C Osorio	6	6
3	(United States) B Pera	6	1	6
Q	(Turkey) Z Sönmez	2	6	4
Q	(Slovenia) K Juvan	1	4
(Estonia) K Kanepi	6	6
D Shnaider	6	4	6
Q	P Kudermetova	0	6	1
Q	(Romania) M Bulgaru	4	4
5	(Austria) J Grabher	6	6

Second round
(Australia) S Hunter	6	6^{2}	4
WC	(Germany) N Noha Akugue	0	7^{7}	6
(Italy) M Trevisan	6	6
8	(Colombia) C Osorio	1	3
3	(United States) B Pera	7^{8}	6
(Estonia) K Kanepi	6^{6}	1
D Shnaider	6	6
5	(Austria) J Grabher	4	2

Quarterfinals
WC	(Germany) N Noha Akugue	5	6	7
(Italy) M Trevisan	7	4	5
3	(United States) B Pera	1	6	4
D Shnaider	6	2	6

Semifinals
WC	(Germany) N Noha Akugue	6	6
D Shnaider	3	3

=== Bottom half ===
First round
6	(Kazakhstan) Y Putintseva	6	6
Q	(France) E Jacquemot	2	4
WC	(Germany) E Seidel	6^{5}	6	3
WC	(Germany) J Niemeier	7^{7}	1	6
(Argentina) ML Carlé	6	2	1
(Germany) T Korpatsch	3	6	6
Q	(Australia) D Saville	6	7^{7}
4	(Italy) J Paolini	0	6^{3}
7	(Netherlands) A Rus	6	4	6
SE	M Timofeeva	2	6	1
(Bulgaria) V Tomova	1	5
(Argentina) N Podoroska	6	7
(Slovakia) AK Schmiedlová	6	3	1
(Hungary) P Udvardy	3	6	6
(Germany) E Lys	6	6
2	(Egypt) M Sherif	1	1

Second round
6	(Kazakhstan) Y Putintseva	7	3	1
WC	(Germany) J Niemeier	5	6	6
(Germany) T Korpatsch	6^{6}	2
Q	(Australia) D Saville	7^{8}	6
7	(Netherlands) A Rus	6	3	7
(Argentina) N Podoroska	3	6	5
(Hungary) P Udvardy	4	1
(Germany) E Lys	6	6

Quarterfinals
WC	(Germany) J Niemeier	3	2
Q	(Australia) D Saville	6	6
7	(Netherlands) A Rus	6	6
(Germany) E Lys	2	2

Semifinals
Q	(Australia) D Saville	6	3	1
7	(Netherlands) A Rus	2	6	6

== Qualifying ==
=== Seeds ===
1. Polina Kudermetova (qualified)
2. (Slovenia) Kaja Juvan (qualified)
3. (Colombia) Emiliana Arango (qualifying competition)
4. (Italy) Nuria Brancaccio (qualifying competition)
5. (France) Elsa Jacquemot (qualified)
6. (Austria) Sinja Kraus (qualifying competition)
7. (Greece) Despina Papamichail (qualifying competition)
8. (Turkey) Zeynep Sönmez (qualified)
9. Ekaterina Makarova (qualifying competition)
10. (Czech Republic) Barbora Palicová (first round)
11. (Germany) Mona Barthel (first round)
12. (Romania) Miriam Bulgaru (qualified)

=== Qualifiers ===
1. Polina Kudermetova
2. (Slovenia) Kaja Juvan
3. (Romania) Miriam Bulgaru
4. (Turkey) Zeynep Sönmez
5. (France) Elsa Jacquemot
6. (Australia) Daria Saville

=== Qualifying draw ===
==== First qualifier ====
First round
1	Polina Kudermetova	6	6
(Belgium) Magali Kempen	3	3
WC	(Austria) Melanie Klaffner	3	1
9	Ekaterina Makarova	6	6

Qualifying competition
1	Polina Kudermetova	7	7
9	Ekaterina Makarova	5	5

==== Second qualifier ====
First round
2	(Slovenia) Kaja Juvan	6	7
(Turkey) Berfu Cengiz	1	5
(Germany) Katharina Hobgarski	4	3
7	(Greece) Despina Papamichail	6	6

Qualifying competition
2	(Slovenia) Kaja Juvan	6	6
7	(Greece) Despina Papamichail	1	2

==== Third qualifier ====
First round
3	(Colombia) Emiliana Arango	6	6
(Turkey) İpek Öz	4	2
WC	(Germany) Lena Papadakis	3	1
12	(Romania) Miriam Bulgaru	6	6

Qualifying competition
3	(Colombia) Emiliana Arango	6^{5}	5
12	(Romania) Miriam Bulgaru	7^{7}	7

==== Fourth qualifier ====
First round
4	(Italy) Nuria Brancaccio	7^{7}	7
(Liechtenstein) Kathinka von Deichmann	6^{5}	5
(Australia) Astra Sharma	6	3	4
8	(Turkey) Zeynep Sönmez	1	6	6

Qualifying competition
4	(Italy) Nuria Brancaccio	4	5
8	(Turkey) Zeynep Sönmez	6	7

==== Fifth qualifier ====
First round
5	(France) Elsa Jacquemot	6	6
Tatiana Prozorova	3	1
WC	(Germany) Kathleen Kanev	6	4	6
11	(Germany) Mona Barthel	3	6	4

Qualifying competition
5	(France) Elsa Jacquemot	7	6
WC	(Germany) Kathleen Kanev	5	0

==== Sixth qualifier ====
First round
6	(Austria) Sinja Kraus	6	6
WC	(Germany) Julia Middendorf	2	3
(Australia) Daria Saville	6	6
10	(Czech Republic) Barbora Palicová	4	3

Qualifying competition
6	(Austria) Sinja Kraus	6	4	3
(Australia) Daria Saville	4	6	6
