= 2024 Hamburg Open – Men's singles =

Men's singles
- 2024 Hamburg Open

Final
- Champion: (France) Arthur Fils
- Runner-up: (Germany) Alexander Zverev
- Score: 6–3, 3–6, 7–6^{(7–1)}

Details
- Draw: 32 (4Q / 3WC)
- Seeds: 8

Events
Singles	men	women
Doubles	men	women
← 2023 ·	Hamburg Open	· 2025 →

Arthur Fils defeated defending champion and top seed Alexander Zverev in the final, 6–3, 3–6, 7–6^{(7–1)} to win the men's singles tennis title at the 2024 Hamburg Open. Fils defeated the top-3 seeds in succession en route to the title. It was his second ATP Tour title and first ATP 500 title.

== Seeds ==
1. (Germany) Alexander Zverev (final)
2. (Denmark) Holger Rune (quarterfinals, retired)
3. (Argentina) Sebastián Báez (semifinals)
4. (Argentina) Francisco Cerúndolo (quarterfinals)
5. (France) Arthur Fils (champion)
6. (Italy) Matteo Arnaldi (first round)
7. (Italy) Luciano Darderi (quarterfinals)
8. (China) Zhang Zhizhen (quarterfinals)

== Draw ==
=== Key ===
- Q = Qualifier
- WC = Wild card
- LL = Lucky loser
- Alt = Alternate
- ITF = ITF entry
- PR = Protected ranking
- SR = Special ranking
- SE = Special exempt
- JE = Junior exempt
- JR = Junior Accelerator Programme entrant
- CO = College Accelerator Programme entrant
- NG = Next Gen Accelerator Program entrant
- w/o = Walkover
- r = Retired
- d = Defaulted

=== Finals ===
Semifinals
1	(Germany) Alexander Zverev	6	6
(Spain) Pedro Martínez	2	4
3	(Argentina) Sebastián Báez	2	2
5	(France) Arthur Fils	6	6

Final
1	(Germany) Alexander Zverev	3	6	6^{1}
5	(France) Arthur Fils	6	3	7^{7}

=== Top half ===
First round
1	(Germany) A Zverev	6	6
Q	(Netherlands) J de Jong	2	2
(Argentina) F Díaz Acosta	6^{4}	6	4
(France) H Gaston	7^{7}	1	6
(Italy) F Cobolli	6	6^{6}	6
(Germany) D Altmaier	4	7^{8}	3
(Brazil) T Seyboth Wild	6^{6}	0
8	(China) Z Zhang	7^{8}	6
4	(Argentina) F Cerúndolo	7	6
LL	(Argentina) F Comesaña	5	4
PR	(South Korea) S-w Kwon	4	7^{8}	5
WC	(Germany) M Marterer	6	6^{6}	7
Q	(France) U Blanchet	4	7^{8}	6
(Australia) A Popyrin	6	6^{6}	2
(Spain) P Martínez	7^{7}	6
6	(Italy) M Arnaldi	6^{4}	1

Second round
1	(Germany) A Zverev	4	6	7
(France) H Gaston	6	2	5
(Italy) F Cobolli	1	6^{5}
8	(China) Z Zhang	6	7^{7}
4	(Argentina) F Cerúndolo	6	6
WC	(Germany) M Marterer	0	2
Q	(France) U Blanchet	4	6	5
(Spain) P Martínez	6	0	7

Quarterfinals
1	(Germany) A Zverev	6	6
8	(China) Z Zhang	4	3
4	(Argentina) F Cerúndolo	6	1	4
(Spain) P Martínez	1	6	6

Semifinals
1	(Germany) A Zverev	6	6
(Spain) P Martínez	2	4

=== Bottom half ===
First round
7	(Italy) L Darderi	6	2	6
LL	(Dominican Republic) N Hardt	1	6	0
WC	(Germany) R Molleker	4	6	4
(Kazakhstan) A Shevchenko	6	4	6
Q	(Brazil) F Meligeni Alves	2	7^{7}	3
(Serbia) D Lajović	6	6^{5}	6
(Germany) D Koepfer	2	3
3	(Argentina) S Báez	6	6
5	(France) A Fils	5	6	6
(Spain) J Munar	7	3	1
(Serbia) L Djere	6	7^{7}
(Belgium) Z Bergs	3	6^{4}
Q	(Argentina) M Trungelliti	6	4
(Austria) S Ofner	1	3^{r}
(Hungary) F Marozsán	4	4
2	(Denmark) H Rune	6	6

Second round
7	(Italy) L Darderi	6	2	6
(Kazakhstan) A Shevchenko	3	6	3
(Serbia) D Lajović	6	5	2
3	(Argentina) S Báez	4	7	6
5	(France) A Fils	7^{7}	6
(Serbia) L Djere	6^{3}	2
Q	(Argentina) M Trungelliti	4	3
2	(Denmark) H Rune	6	6

Quarterfinals
7	(Italy) L Darderi	6	4	4
3	(Argentina) S Báez	2	6	6
5	(France) A Fils	6	4
2	(Denmark) H Rune	4	1^{r}

Semifinals
3	(Argentina) S Báez	2	2
5	(France) A Fils	6	6

== Qualifying ==
=== Seeds ===
1. (Netherlands) Jesper de Jong (qualified)
2. (Argentina) Francisco Comesaña (qualifying competition, lucky loser)
3. (Kazakhstan) Mikhail Kukushkin (first round)
4. (Brazil) Felipe Meligeni Alves (qualified)
5. (Argentina) Marco Trungelliti (qualified)
6. (Chinese Taipei) Tseng Chun-hsin (first round)
7. (France) Ugo Blanchet (qualified)
8. (Dominican Republic) Nick Hardt (qualifying competition, lucky loser)

=== Qualifiers ===
1. (Netherlands) Jesper de Jong
2. (France) Ugo Blanchet
3. (Argentina) Marco Trungelliti
4. (Brazil) Felipe Meligeni Alves

=== Lucky losers ===
1. (Argentina) Francisco Comesaña
2. (Dominican Republic) Nick Hardt

=== Qualifying draw ===
==== First qualifier ====
First round
1	(Netherlands) Jesper de Jong	7^{7}	6
WC	(Germany) Max Hans Rehberg	6^{5}	1
WC	(Germany) Marvin Möller	2	4
8	(Dominican Republic) Nick Hardt	6	6

Qualifying competition
1	(Netherlands) Jesper de Jong	6	6
8	(Dominican Republic) Nick Hardt	3	4

==== Second qualifier ====
First round
2	(Argentina) Francisco Comesaña	6	7
(Jordan) Abdullah Shelbayh	4	5
(Czech Republic) Dalibor Svrčina	5	6^{5}
7	(France) Ugo Blanchet	7	7^{7}

Qualifying competition
2	(Argentina) Francisco Comesaña	3	4
7	(France) Ugo Blanchet	6	6

==== Third qualifier ====
First round
3	(Kazakhstan) Mikhail Kukushkin	5	3
(Tunisia) Aziz Dougaz	7	6
WC	(Germany) Marko Topo	7	3	0
5	(Argentina) Marco Trungelliti	5	6	6

Qualifying competition
(Tunisia) Aziz Dougaz	3	2
5	(Argentina) Marco Trungelliti	6	6

==== Fourth qualifier ====
First round
4	(Brazil) Felipe Meligeni Alves	3	6	7^{7}
(Ukraine) Vitaliy Sachko	6	2	6^{4}
PR	(Serbia) Filip Krajinović	6	2	6
6	(Chinese Taipei) Tseng Chun-hsin	4	6	1

Qualifying competition
4	(Brazil) Felipe Meligeni Alves	6	6
PR	(Serbia) Filip Krajinović	3	4
