= 2025 Hamburg Open – Men's singles =

Men's singles
- 2025 Hamburg Open

Final
- Champion: (Italy) Flavio Cobolli
- Runner-up: Andrey Rublev
- Score: 6–2, 6–4

Details
- Draw: 32 (4Q / 3WC)
- Seeds: 8

Events
Singles	men	women
Doubles	men	women
← 2024 ·	Hamburg Open	· 2026 →

Flavio Cobolli defeated Andrey Rublev in the final, 6–2, 6–4 to win the men's singles tennis title at the 2025 Hamburg Open. It was his second ATP Tour title and first ATP 500 title.

Arthur Fils was the reigning champion, but did not participate this year.

== Seeds ==
1. (Germany) Alexander Zverev (second round)
2. (United States) Frances Tiafoe (second round)
3. Andrey Rublev (final)
4. (Argentina) Francisco Cerúndolo (second round)
5. (Spain) Alejandro Davidovich Fokina (second round)
6. (Canada) Félix Auger-Aliassime (semifinals)
7. (United States) Brandon Nakashima (second round)
8. (Argentina) Sebastián Báez (first round)

== Draw ==
Key

- Q = Qualifier
- WC = Wild card
- LL = Lucky loser
- Alt = Alternate
- ITF = ITF entry
- PR = Protected ranking
- SR = Special ranking
- SE = Special exempt
- JE = Junior exempt
- JR = Junior Accelerator Programme entrant
- CO = College Accelerator Programme entrant
- NG = Next Gen Accelerator Program entrant
- w/o = Walkover
- r = Retired
- d = Defaulted

=== Finals ===
Semifinals
6	(Canada) Félix Auger-Aliassime	1	4
3	Andrey Rublev	6	6
(Argentina) Tomás Martín Etcheverry	6	5	4
(Italy) Flavio Cobolli	2	7	6

Final
3	Andrey Rublev	2	4
(Italy) Flavio Cobolli	6	6

=== Top half ===
First round
1/WC	(Germany) A Zverev	6	7^{7}
Q	(United States) A Kovacevic	1	6^{5}
Q	(Sweden) E Ymer	3	5
(France) A Müller	6	7
(France) G Mpetshi Perricard	7^{8}	6
(Kazakhstan) A Bublik	6^{6}	4
(Germany) D Altmaier	3	3
6	(Canada) F Auger-Aliassime	6	6
3	A Rublev	6	6
(Bosnia and Herzegovina) D Džumhur	4	3
WC	(Germany) J-L Struff	6^{4}	6^{4}
WC	(Germany) J Engel	7^{7}	7^{7}
WC	(Germany) D Dedura	1	4
(Italy) L Darderi	6	6
Q	(Belgium) R Collignon	5^{r}
7	(United States) B Nakashima	6

Second round
1/WC	(Germany) A Zverev	3	6	6^{5}
(France) A Müller	6	4	7^{7}
(France) G Mpetshi Perricard	2	4
6	(Canada) F Auger-Aliassime	6	6
3	A Rublev	6	7
WC	(Germany) J Engel	3	5
(Italy) L Darderi	7	6^{7}	6
7	(United States) B Nakashima	5	7^{9}	2

Quarterfinals
(France) A Müller	6^{4}	7^{8}	3
6	(Canada) F Auger-Aliassime	7^{7}	6^{6}	6
3	A Rublev	6	3	6
(Italy) L Darderi	1	6	3

Semifinals
6	(Canada) F Auger-Aliassime	1	4
3	A Rublev	6	6

=== Bottom half ===
First round
8	(Argentina) S Báez	3	6	4
(Argentina) C Ugo Carabelli	6	2	6
(Argentina) TM Etcheverry	7^{7}	6
(Argentina) F Comesaña	6^{4}	3
Q	(Croatia) B Gojo	4	6	2
(Czech Republic) J Lehečka	6	3	6
(Spain) P Martínez	2	3
4	(Argentina) F Cerúndolo	6	6
5	(Spain) A Davidovich Fokina	6	6
(France) G Monfils	3	3
LL	(Ukraine) V Sachko	7	2	2
(Italy) F Cobolli	5	6	6
(United States) M Giron	6^{5}	0
(Spain) R Bautista Agut	7^{7}	6
(China) Y Bu	5	2
2	(United States) F Tiafoe	7	6

Second round
(Argentina) C Ugo Carabelli	4	4
(Argentina) TM Etcheverry	6	6
(Czech Republic) J Lehečka	7	6
4	(Argentina) F Cerúndolo	5	2
5	(Spain) A Davidovich Fokina	4	5
(Italy) F Cobolli	6	7
(Spain) R Bautista Agut	6	6
2	(United States) F Tiafoe	2	3

Quarterfinals
(Argentina) TM Etcheverry	7	6
(Czech Republic) J Lehečka	5	3
(Italy) F Cobolli	7^{7}	6
(Spain) R Bautista Agut	6^{4}	0

Semifinals
(Argentina) TM Etcheverry	6	5	4
(Italy) F Cobolli	2	7	6

== Qualifying ==
=== Seeds ===
1. (Australia) Aleksandar Vukic (first round)
2. (United States) Aleksandar Kovacevic (qualified)
3. (Australia) Christopher O'Connell (first round)
4. (Belgium) Raphaël Collignon (qualified)
5. (United States) Emilio Nava (first round)
6. (Germany) Max Hans Rehberg (first round)
7. (Croatia) Borna Gojo (qualified)
8. (Ukraine) Vitaliy Sachko (qualifying competition, lucky loser)

=== Qualifiers ===
1. (Croatia) Borna Gojo
2. (United States) Aleksandar Kovacevic
3. (Sweden) Elias Ymer
4. (Belgium) Raphaël Collignon

=== Lucky loser ===
1. (Ukraine) Vitaliy Sachko

=== Qualifying draw ===
==== First qualifier ====
First round
1	(Australia) Aleksandar Vukic	4	2
(Bulgaria) Dimitar Kuzmanov	6	6
WC	(Germany) Mika Petkovic	3	2
7/Alt	(Croatia) Borna Gojo	6	6

Qualifying competition
(Bulgaria) Dimitar Kuzmanov	5	4
7/Alt	(Croatia) Borna Gojo	7	6

==== Second qualifier ====
First round
2	(United States) Aleksandar Kovacevic	7^{7}	6
WC	(Germany) Max Wiskandt	6^{4}	4
(Kazakhstan) Denis Yevseyev	2	1
8	(Ukraine) Vitaliy Sachko	6	6

Qualifying competition
2	(United States) Aleksandar Kovacevic	6	6
8	(Ukraine) Vitaliy Sachko	1	3

==== Third qualifier ====
First round
3	(Australia) Christopher O'Connell	2	6	4
(Sweden) Elias Ymer	6	3	6
WC	(Germany) Marko Topo	6	3	6
5	(United States) Emilio Nava	3	6	2

Qualifying competition
(Sweden) Elias Ymer	6^{5}	6	6
WC	(Germany) Marko Topo	7^{7}	4	4

==== Fourth qualifier ====
First round
4	(Belgium) Raphaël Collignon	6	7^{7}
(Germany) Patrick Zahraj	3	6^{3}
(Brazil) Daniel Dutra da Silva	6	6
6	(Germany) Max Hans Rehberg	4	4

Qualifying competition
4	(Belgium) Raphaël Collignon	6	6
(Brazil) Daniel Dutra da Silva	2	3
