= 2024 Pirulo Cup Pazardzhik – Singles =

Singles
- 2024 Pirulo Cup Pazardzhik

Final
- Champion: (Germany) Ella Seidel
- Runner-up: (Germany) Caroline Werner
- Score: 6–1, 6–4

Events
Singles	Doubles
← 2023 ·	Pazardzhik Cup	· 2025 →

María Lourdes Carlé was the defending champion but chose not to participate.

Ella Seidel won the title, defeating Caroline Werner in the final, 6–1, 6–4.

== Seeds ==
1. (Latvia) Darja Semeņistaja (second round)
2. (Australia) Astra Sharma (first round)
3. (Germany) Ella Seidel (champion)
4. Ekaterina Makarova (second round)
5. (Ukraine) Katarina Zavatska (quarterfinals, retired)
6. (Spain) Leyre Romero Gormaz (semifinals)
7. (Andorra) Victoria Jiménez Kasintseva (quarterfinals)
8. (Slovenia) Veronika Erjavec (second round)

== Draw ==
=== Key ===
- Q = Qualifier
- WC = Wild card
- LL = Lucky loser
- Alt = Alternate
- SE = Special exempt
- PR = Protected ranking
- ITF = ITF entry
- JE = Junior exempt
- w/o = Walkover
- r = Retired
- d = Defaulted
- SR = Special ranking

=== Finals ===
Semifinals
Alevtina Ibragimova	6^{6}	6	4
Q	(Germany) Caroline Werner	7^{8}	3	6
3	(Germany) Ella Seidel	6	6
6	(Spain) Leyre Romero Gormaz	3	3

Final
Q	(Germany) Caroline Werner	1	4
3	(Germany) Ella Seidel	6	6

=== Top half ===
First round
1	(Latvia) D Semeņistaja	6	1
(Turkey) İ Öz	1	0^{r}
A Ibragimova	6	6
Q	(Czech Republic) M Bayerlová	1	4
(Spain) G Maristany	7^{7}	6
Q	A Anshba	6^{3}	2
(Romania) I Bara	3	1
5	(Ukraine) K Zavatska	6	6
4	E Makarova	6	6
WC	(Germany) M Mack	2	1
WC	(Bulgaria) L Karatancheva	7	6
(Bulgaria) G Topalova	5	1
(Cyprus) R Șerban	2	2
Q	(Germany) C Werner	6	6
Q	(Serbia) M Ristić	6	1	4
8	(Slovenia) V Erjavec	3	6	6

Second round
1	(Latvia) D Semeņistaja	5	0
A Ibragimova	7	6
(Spain) G Maristany	5	4
5	(Ukraine) K Zavatska	7	6
4	E Makarova	3	6	2
WC	(Bulgaria) L Karatancheva	6	4	6
Q	(Germany) C Werner	7^{7}	6
8	(Slovenia) V Erjavec	6^{5}	4

Quarterfinals
A Ibragimova	7	4
5	(Ukraine) K Zavatska	5	2^{r}
WC	(Bulgaria) L Karatancheva	6^{3}	2
Q	(Germany) C Werner	7^{7}	6

Semifinals
A Ibragimova	6^{6}	6	4
Q	(Germany) C Werner	7^{8}	3	6

=== Bottom half ===
First round
7	(Andorra) V Jiménez Kasintseva	6	6
(Greece) D Papamichail	4	0
(Germany) N Noha Akugue	6	7^{8}
LL	(Bulgaria) D Evtimova	2	6^{6}
WC	(Bulgaria) R Dencheva	6	7
Q	(Bulgaria) L Encheva	3	5
WC	(Ukraine) Y Kotliar	1	3
3	(Germany) E Seidel	6	6
6	(Spain) L Romero Gormaz	6	6
Q	(Romania) G Lee	3	2
(United States) M Mateas	3	2
(Belgium) M Benoît	6	6
Q	(Bulgaria) D Glushkova	5	1
Q	(Romania) A Prisăcariu	7	6
(Greece) S Sakellaridi	6	6
2	(Australia) A Sharma	3	2

Second round
7	(Andorra) V Jiménez Kasintseva	6	7
(Germany) N Noha Akugue	3	5
WC	(Bulgaria) R Dencheva	3	2
3	(Germany) E Seidel	6	6
6	(Spain) L Romero Gormaz	6	6
(Belgium) M Benoît	2	4
Q	(Romania) A Prisăcariu	6	6
(Greece) S Sakellaridi	4	4

Quarterfinals
7	(Andorra) V Jiménez Kasintseva	4	6	6^{5}
3	(Germany) E Seidel	6	1	7^{7}
6	(Spain) L Romero Gormaz	6	1	6
Q	(Romania) A Prisăcariu	3	6	2

Semifinals
3	(Germany) E Seidel	6	6
6	(Spain) L Romero Gormaz	3	3
