= 2023 Hamburg European Open – Men's doubles =

Men's doubles
- 2023 Hamburg European Open

Final
- Champions: (Germany) Kevin Krawietz (Germany) Tim Pütz
- Runners-up: (Belgium) Sander Gillé (Belgium) Joran Vliegen
- Score: 7–6^{(7–4)}, 6–3

Details
- Draw: 16
- Seeds: 4

Events
| Singles | men | women |
| Doubles | men | women |
| ← 2022 · | Hamburg European Open | · 2024 → |

Kevin Krawietz and Tim Pütz defeated Sander Gillé and Joran Vliegen in the final, 7–6^{(7–4)}, 6–3 to win the men's doubles tennis title at the 2023 Hamburg European Open.

Lloyd Glasspool and Harri Heliövaara were the defending champions, but lost in the first round to Hugo Dellien and Guido Pella.

== Seeds ==
1. (United Kingdom) Lloyd Glasspool / (Finland) Harri Heliövaara (first round)
2. (Croatia) Ivan Dodig / (Croatia) Mate Pavić (quarterfinals)
3. (Germany) Kevin Krawietz / (Germany) Tim Pütz (champions)
4. (Belgium) Sander Gillé / (Belgium) Joran Vliegen (final)

== Draw ==
=== Key ===
- Q = Qualifier
- WC = Wild card
- LL = Lucky loser
- Alt = Alternate
- ITF = ITF entry
- PR = Protected ranking
- SR = Special ranking
- SE = Special exempt
- JE = Junior exempt
- JR = Junior Accelerator Programme entrant
- CO = College Accelerator Programme entrant
- NG = Next Gen Accelerator Program entrant
- w/o = Walkover
- r = Retired
- d = Defaulted

=== Draw ===
First round
1 | (United Kingdom) L Glasspool (Finland) H Heliövaara | 3 | 3
PR | (Bolivia) H Dellien (Argentina) G Pella | 6 | 6
LL | (Bolivia) B Arias (Bolivia) F Zeballos | 6^{5} | 3
(Serbia) N Ćaćić (Romania) VV Cornea | 7^{7} | 6
3 | (Germany) K Krawietz (Germany) T Pütz | 7^{7} | 6
Q | (Germany) M Möller (Germany) M Topo | 6^{4} | 3
WC | (Germany) R Molleker (Germany) MH Rehberg | 3 | 2
(Colombia) JS Cabal (Netherlands) M Middelkoop | 6 | 6
(Argentina) S Báez (Spain) B Zapata Miralles | 4 | 4
(Netherlands) R Haase (Croatia) N Mektić | 6 | 6
WC | (Germany) C Frantzen (Germany) H Jebens | 2 | 4
4 | (Belgium) S Gillé (Belgium) J Vliegen | 6 | 6
(Austria) A Erler (Austria) L Miedler | 4 | 6 | [13]
(France) F Martin (Germany) A Mies | 6 | 2 | [11]
(Argentina) F Cerúndolo (Argentina) TM Etcheverry
2 | (Croatia) I Dodig (Croatia) M Pavić | w/o

Quarterfinals
PR | (Bolivia) H Dellien (Argentina) G Pella | 3 | 4
(Serbia) N Ćaćić (Romania) VV Cornea | 6 | 6
3 | (Germany) K Krawietz (Germany) T Pütz | 7 | 6
(Colombia) JS Cabal (Netherlands) M Middelkoop | 5 | 4
(Netherlands) R Haase (Croatia) N Mektić | 7^{7} | 5 | [9]
4 | (Belgium) S Gillé (Belgium) J Vliegen | 6^{2} | 7 | [11]
(Austria) A Erler (Austria) L Miedler | 7^{7} | 6
2 | (Croatia) I Dodig (Croatia) M Pavić | 6^{5} | 4

Semifinals
(Serbia) N Ćaćić (Romania) VV Cornea | 1 | 4
3 | (Germany) K Krawietz (Germany) T Pütz | 6 | 6
4 | (Belgium) S Gillé (Belgium) J Vliegen | 6 | 6
(Austria) A Erler (Austria) L Miedler | 3 | 4

Final
3 | (Germany) K Krawietz (Germany) T Pütz | 7^{7} | 6
4 | (Belgium) S Gillé (Belgium) J Vliegen | 6^{4} | 3

== Qualifying ==
=== Seeds ===
1. (Ecuador) Diego Hidalgo / (Colombia) Cristian Rodríguez (first round)
2. (Bolivia) Boris Arias / (Bolivia) Federico Zeballos (qualifying competition, lucky losers)

=== Qualifiers ===
1. (Germany) Marvin Möller / (Germany) Marko Topo

=== Lucky losers ===
1. (Bolivia) Boris Arias / (Bolivia) Federico Zeballos

=== Qualifying draw ===
First round
1 | (Ecuador) Diego Hidalgo (Colombia) Cristian Rodríguez | 4 | 4
WC | (Germany) Marvin Möller (Germany) Marko Topo | 6 | 6
(Serbia) Ivan Sabanov (Serbia) Matej Sabanov | 6^{4} | 6 | [7]
2 | (Bolivia) Boris Arias (Bolivia) Federico Zeballos | 7^{7} | 4 | [10]

Qualifying competition
WC | (Germany) Marvin Möller (Germany) Marko Topo | 6 | 6^{1} | [10]
2 | (Bolivia) Boris Arias (Bolivia) Federico Zeballos | 4 | 7^{7} | [6]
