= 2023 Hamburg European Open – Women's doubles =

Women's doubles
- 2023 Hamburg European Open

Final
- Champions: (Kazakhstan) Anna Danilina; Alexandra Panova
- Runners-up: (Czech Republic) Miriam Kolodziejová (United States) Angela Kulikov
- Score: 6–4, 6–2

Details
- Draw: 16
- Seeds: 4

Events
Singles	men	women
Doubles	men	women
- Hamburg European Open

The first-seeded team of Anna Danilina and Alexandra Panova defeated Miriam Kolodziejová and Angela Kulikov in the final, 6–4, 6–2 to win the women's doubles tennis title at the 2023 Hamburg European Open.

Sophie Chang and Kulikov were the reigning champions, but Chang chose not to participate this year.

== Seeds ==
1. (Kazakhstan) Anna Danilina / Alexandra Panova (champions)
2. (Czech Republic) Miriam Kolodziejová / (United States) Angela Kulikov (final)
3. (Germany) Vivian Heisen / (Estonia) Ingrid Neel (semifinals)
4. (Netherlands) Arantxa Rus / (Hungary) Panna Udvardy (first round)

== Draw ==
Key

- Q = Qualifier
- WC = Wild card
- LL = Lucky loser
- Alt = Alternate
- ITF = ITF entry
- PR = Protected ranking
- SR = Special ranking
- SE = Special exempt
- JE = Junior exempt
- JR = Junior Accelerator Programme entrant
- CO = College Accelerator Programme entrant
- NG = Next Gen Accelerator Program entrant
- w/o = Walkover
- r = Retired
- d = Defaulted

=== Draw ===
First round
1	(Kazakhstan) A Danilina; A Panova	6	6
(Italy) N Brancaccio (Greece) D Papamichail	0	2
WC	(Austria) M Klaffner (Austria) S Kraus	6	6
(Czech Republic) M Bayerlová (Slovenia) N Radišić	4	1
4	(Netherlands) A Rus (Hungary) P Udvardy	6	5	[10]
WC	(Germany) N Noha Akugue (Germany) E Seidel	4	7	[12]
(Italy) A Moratelli (Italy) C Rosatello	6	6
(United Kingdom) E Appleton (Germany) J Lohoff	2	3
(Czech Republic) A Sisková (Czech Republic) R Voráčová	6	3	[10]
(Germany) T Korpatsch (Germany) L Papadakis	4	6	[6]
(Belgium) M Kempen (Netherlands) R van der Hoek	3	1^{r}
3	(Germany) V Heisen (Estonia) I Neel	6	4
(Colombia) Y Lizarazo (Colombia) MP Pérez García	1	4
A Fomina-Klotz; S Lansere	6	6
(United States) J Aney (Australia) A Sharma	3	4
2	(Czech Republic) M Kolodziejová (United States) A Kulikov	6	6

Quarterfinals
1	(Kazakhstan) A Danilina; A Panova	6	6
WC	(Austria) M Klaffner (Austria) S Kraus	1	3
WC	(Germany) N Noha Akugue (Germany) E Seidel	6	6^{3}	[7]
(Italy) A Moratelli (Italy) C Rosatello	2	7^{7}	[10]
(Czech Republic) A Sisková (Czech Republic) R Voráčová	4	2
3	(Germany) V Heisen (Estonia) I Neel	6	6
A Fomina-Klotz; S Lansere	6	4	[6]
2	(Czech Republic) M Kolodziejová (United States) A Kulikov	3	6	[10]

Semifinals
1	(Kazakhstan) A Danilina; A Panova	3	7^{7}	[10]
(Italy) A Moratelli (Italy) C Rosatello	6	6^{5}	[3]
3	(Germany) V Heisen (Estonia) I Neel	3	6	[12]
2	(Czech Republic) M Kolodziejová (United States) A Kulikov	6	3	[14]

Final
1	(Kazakhstan) A Danilina; A Panova	6	6
2	(Czech Republic) M Kolodziejová (United States) A Kulikov	4	2
