= 2023 Hamburg European Open =

- Date: 23–30 July
- Edition: 117th (men); 21st (women)
- Category: ATP 500 (men); WTA 250 (women)
- Draw: 32S / 16D (men); 32S / 16D (women)
- Prize money: €1,831,515 (men) $259,303 (women)
- Surface: Clay
- Location: Hamburg, Germany
- Venue: Am Rothenbaum

Champions

Men's singles
- (Germany) Alexander Zverev

Women's singles
- (Netherlands) Arantxa Rus

Men's doubles
- (Germany) Kevin Krawietz / (Germany) Tim Pütz

Women's doubles
- (Kazakhstan) Anna Danilina / Alexandra Panova
- Hamburg European Open

The 2023 Hamburg European Open was a combined men's and women's tennis tournament played on outdoor clay courts. It was the 117th edition of the event for the men and the 21st edition for the women. The tournament was classified as an ATP Tour 500 series on the 2023 ATP Tour (called the Hamburg Open) and as a WTA 250 tournament on the 2023 WTA Tour. The tournament took place at Am Rothenbaum in Hamburg, Germany between 23 and 30 July 2023.

== Finals ==
=== Men's singles ===
- (Germany) Alexander Zverev defeated (Serbia) Laslo Djere, 7–5, 6–3

=== Women's singles ===
- (Netherlands) Arantxa Rus defeated (Germany) Noma Noha Akugue 6–0, 7–6^{(7–3)}

=== Men's doubles ===
- (Germany) Kevin Krawietz / (Germany) Tim Pütz defeated (Belgium) Sander Gillé / (Belgium) Joran Vliegen, 7–6^{(7–4)}, 6–3

=== Women's doubles ===
- (Kazakhstan) Anna Danilina / Alexandra Panova defeated (Czech Republic) Miriam Kolodziejová / (United States) Angela Kulikov 6–4, 6–2

== Points distribution ==
Event	W	F	SF	QF	Round of 16	Round of 32	Q	Q2	Q1
Men's singles	500	300	180	90	45	0	20	10	0
Men's doubles	500	300	180	90	0	—N/a	45	25	—N/a
Women's singles	280	180	110	60	30	1	18	12	1
Women's doubles	280	180	110	60	1	—N/a	—N/a	—N/a	—N/a

== ATP singles main draw entrants ==
=== Seeds ===
Country	Player	Rank	Seed
NOR	Casper Ruud	4	1
	Andrey Rublev	7	2
ITA	Lorenzo Musetti	16	3
GER	Alexander Zverev	19	4
ARG	Francisco Cerúndolo	20	5
ARG	Tomás Martín Etcheverry	34	6
ESP	Alejandro Davidovich Fokina	35	7
SRB	Miomir Kecmanović	44	8

- Rankings are as of 17 July 2023.

=== Other entrants ===
The following players received wildcards into the main draw:

- (Germany) Maximilian Marterer
- (Germany) Rudolf Molleker
- Andrey Rublev

The following players received entry using a protected ranking:

- (Bolivia) Hugo Dellien
- (Argentina) Guido Pella

The following players received entry from the qualifying draw:

- (United Kingdom) Jan Choinski
- (Chile) Cristian Garín
- (Brazil) Thiago Seyboth Wild
- (Sweden) Elias Ymer

The following players received entry as lucky losers:

- (Colombia) Daniel Elahi Galán
- (Slovakia) Jozef Kovalík
- (Brazil) Thiago Monteiro

=== Withdrawals ===
- Aslan Karatsev → replaced by (France) Luca Van Assche
- (Finland) Emil Ruusuvuori → replaced by (Colombia) Daniel Elahi Galán
- (Germany) Jan-Lennard Struff → replaced by (Argentina) Guido Pella
- (Netherlands) Botic van de Zandschulp → replaced by (Brazil) Thiago Monteiro
- (Peru) Juan Pablo Varillas → replaced by (Slovakia) Jozef Kovalík
- (Sweden) Mikael Ymer → replaced by (Bolivia) Hugo Dellien

== ATP doubles main draw entrants ==
=== Seeds ===
Country	Player	Country	Player	Rank	Seed
GBR	Lloyd Glasspool	FIN	Harri Heliövaara	24	1
CRO	Ivan Dodig	CRO	Mate Pavić	25	2
GER	Kevin Krawietz	GER	Tim Pütz	38	3
BEL	Sander Gillé	BEL	Joran Vliegen	50	4

- Rankings are as of 17 July 2023.

=== Other entrants ===
The following pairs received wildcards into the doubles main draw:

- (Germany) Constantin Frantzen / (Germany) Hendrik Jebens
- (Germany) Rudolf Molleker / (Germany) Max Hans Rehberg

The following pair received entry from the qualifying draw:

- (Germany) Marvin Möller / (Germany) Marko Topo

The following pair received entry as lucky losers:

- (Bolivia) Boris Arias / (Bolivia) Federico Zeballos

=== Withdrawals ===
- (Argentina) Máximo González / (Argentina) Andrés Molteni → replaced by (Bolivia) Hugo Dellien / (Argentina) Guido Pella
- (Spain) Marcel Granollers / (Argentina) Horacio Zeballos → replaced by (Bolivia) Boris Arias / (Bolivia) Federico Zeballos
- (Netherlands) Wesley Koolhof / (United Kingdom) Neal Skupski → replaced by (Argentina) Sebastián Báez / (Spain) Bernabé Zapata Miralles
- (Monaco) Hugo Nys / (Poland) Jan Zieliński → replaced by (Serbia) Nikola Ćaćić / (Romania) Victor Vlad Cornea

== WTA singles main draw entrants ==
=== Seeds ===
Country	Player	Rank	Seed
CRO	Donna Vekić	22	1
EGY	Mayar Sherif	38	2
USA	Bernarda Pera	39	3
ITA	Jasmine Paolini	52	4
AUT	Julia Grabher	58	5
KAZ	Yulia Putintseva	60	6
NED	Arantxa Rus	62	7
COL	Camila Osorio	74	8

- Rankings are as of 17 July 2023.

=== Other entrants ===
The following players received wildcards into the main draw:

- (Germany) Jule Niemeier
- (Germany) Noma Noha Akugue
- (Germany) Ella Seidel

The following player received entry as a special exempt:

- Maria Timofeeva

The following players received entry from the qualifying draw:

- (Romania) Miriam Bulgaru
- (France) Elsa Jacquemot
- (Slovenia) Kaja Juvan
- Polina Kudermetova
- (Australia) Daria Saville
- (Turkey) Zeynep Sönmez

=== Withdrawals ===
- (Romania) Sorana Cirstea → replaced by (Germany) Tamara Korpatsch
- (Germany) Anna-Lena Friedsam → replaced by (Brazil) Laura Pigossi
- Anna Kalinskaya → replaced by (Argentina) María Lourdes Carlé
- Daria Kasatkina → replaced by (Australia) Storm Hunter
- (United States) Elizabeth Mandlik → replaced by (Bulgaria) Viktoriya Tomova
- (United States) Alycia Parks → replaced by (Estonia) Kaia Kanepi
- Anastasia Potapova → replaced by (Germany) Eva Lys

== WTA doubles main draw entrants ==
=== Seeds ===
Country	Player	Country	Player	Rank	Seed
KAZ	Anna Danilina		Alexandra Panova	103	1
CZE	Miriam Kolodziejová	USA	Angela Kulikov	123	2
GER	Vivian Heisen	EST	Ingrid Neel	187	3
NED	Arantxa Rus	HUN	Panna Udvardy	196	4

- Rankings are as of 17 July 2023.

=== Other entrants ===
The following pairs received wildcards into the doubles main draw:

- (Austria) Melanie Klaffner / (Austria) Sinja Kraus
- (Germany) Noma Noha Akugue / (Germany) Ella Seidel
