= 2024 Hamburg Open – Women's singles =

Women's singles
- 2024 Hamburg Open

Final
- Champion: (Hungary) Anna Bondár
- Runner-up: (Netherlands) Arantxa Rus
- Score: 6–4, 6–2

Details
- Draw: 32
- Seeds: 8

Events
Singles	men	women
Doubles	men	women
- Hamburg Open

Anna Bondár won the women's singles title at the 2024 Hamburg Open, defeating defending champion Arantxa Rus in the final, 6–4, 6–2.

== Seeds ==
1. (Egypt) Mayar Sherif (quarterfinals)
2. (Germany) Tamara Korpatsch (quarterfinals)
3. (Netherlands) Arantxa Rus (final)
4. (Hungary) Anna Bondár (champion)
5. (Brazil) Laura Pigossi (first round)
6. (Slovakia) Rebecca Šramková (first round)
7. (Germany) Eva Lys (quarterfinals, retired)
8. (Croatia) Jana Fett (second round)

== Draw ==
Key

- Q = Qualifier
- WC = Wild card
- LL = Lucky loser
- Alt = Alternate
- ITF = ITF entry
- PR = Protected ranking
- SR = Special ranking
- SE = Special exempt
- JE = Junior exempt
- JR = Junior Accelerator Programme entrant
- CO = College Accelerator Programme entrant
- NG = Next Gen Accelerator Program entrant
- w/o = Walkover
- r = Retired
- d = Defaulted

=== Finals ===
Semifinals
(Serbia) Olga Danilović	1	6	4
4	(Hungary) Anna Bondár	6	3	6
3	(Netherlands) Arantxa Rus	6	6
(Romania) Elena-Gabriela Ruse	4	3

Final
4	(Hungary) Anna Bondár	6	6
3	(Netherlands) Arantxa Rus	4	2

=== Top half ===
First round
1	(Egypt) M Sherif	6	6
Q	(Belgium) M Benoît	2	1
Q	(Ukraine) A Sobolieva	3	7	7^{10}
(Turkey) Z Sönmez	6	5	6^{8}
PR	(Serbia) N Stojanović	6^{4}	1
(Germany) N Noha Akugue	7^{7}	6
(Serbia) O Danilović	6	6
6	(Slovakia) R Šramková	3	1
4	(Hungary) A Bondár	6	6
Q	(Germany) A Petkovic	1	3
(Ukraine) K Baindl	6	6
WC	(Germany) C Kuhl	3	2
E Makarova	1	1
(Germany) E Seidel	6	6
WC	(Germany) J Middendorf	3	1
7	(Germany) E Lys	6	6

Second round
1	(Egypt) M Sherif	6	6
Q	(Ukraine) A Sobolieva	1	3
(Germany) N Noha Akugue	6	2	6^{6}
(Serbia) O Danilović	3	6	7^{8}
4	(Hungary) A Bondár	7^{7}	6
(Ukraine) K Baindl	6^{5}	3
(Germany) E Seidel	2	6	2
7	(Germany) E Lys	6	3	6

Quarterfinals
1	(Egypt) M Sherif	6	2	1
(Serbia) O Danilović	3	6	6
4	(Hungary) A Bondár	6	0
7	(Germany) E Lys	0	0^{r}

Semifinals
(Serbia) O Danilović	1	6	4
4	(Hungary) A Bondár	6	3	6

=== Bottom half ===
First round
8	(Croatia) J Fett	6	6
(Slovenia) D Jakupović	4	1
P Kudermetova	6	6
WC	(Germany) J Silva	2	3
(Germany) M Barthel	7	4	3
(Croatia) L Bošković	5	6	6
(Netherlands) S Lamens	1	4
3	(Netherlands) A Rus	6	6
5	(Brazil) L Pigossi	3	4
(Romania) E-G Ruse	6	6
WC	(Germany) TJ Brockmann	3	0
Q	(Serbia) D Radanović	6	6
(Romania) I-C Begu	6	6
(Latvia) D Semeņistaja	3	2
(Greece) D Papamichail	0	6	4
2	(Germany) T Korpatsch	6	2	6

Second round
8	(Croatia) J Fett	3	3
P Kudermetova	6	6
(Croatia) L Bošković	1	1
3	(Netherlands) A Rus	6	6
(Romania) E-G Ruse	7	7
Q	(Serbia) D Radanović	5	5
(Romania) I-C Begu	4	1^{r}
2	(Germany) T Korpatsch	6	3

Quarterfinals
P Kudermetova	2	4
3	(Netherlands) A Rus	6	6
(Romania) E-G Ruse	6	4	6
2	(Germany) T Korpatsch	1	6	3

Semifinals
3	(Netherlands) A Rus	6	6
(Romania) E-G Ruse	4	3

== Qualifying ==
=== Seeds ===
1. (France) Elsa Jacquemot (qualifying competition)
2. (Switzerland) Jil Teichmann (qualifying competition, retired)
3. (Ukraine) Anastasiia Sobolieva (qualified)
4. (Belgium) Marie Benoît (qualified)

=== Qualifiers ===
1. (Serbia) Dejana Radanović
2. (Germany) Anna Petkovic
3. (Ukraine) Anastasiia Sobolieva
4. (Belgium) Marie Benoît

=== Qualifying draw ===
==== First qualifier ====
Qualifying competition
1	(France) Elsa Jacquemot	5	0
	(Serbia) Dejana Radanović	7	6

==== Second qualifier ====
Qualifying competition
2	(Switzerland) Jil Teichmann	5	0^{r}
WC	(Germany) Anna Petkovic	7	0

==== Third qualifier ====
Qualifying competition
3	(Ukraine) Anastasiia Sobolieva	6	6
	(Turkey) İpek Öz	3	1

==== Fourth qualifier ====
Qualifying competition
4	(Belgium) Marie Benoît	3	6	7^{9}
WC	(Germany) Mara Guth	6	2	6^{7}
