= Pazardzhik Cup =

- 2024 Pirulo Cup Pazardzhik

Women's World Tennis Tour
- Event name: Pazardzhik Cup (2020); Favorit Open (2023); Pirulo Cup Pazardzhik (2024–)
- Location: Pazardzhik, Bulgaria
- Venue: Tennis Club Favorit
- Category: ITF Women's World Tennis Tour
- Surface: Clay
- Draw: 32S/32Q/16D
- Prize money: $60,000
- Website: Official website

The Pazardzhik Cup is a tournament for professional female tennis players played on outdoor clay courts. The event is classified as a $60,000 ITF Women's World Tennis Tour tournament and has been held in Pazardzhik, Bulgaria, since 2020.

== Past finals ==
=== Singles ===
Year	Champion	Runner-up	Score
2026	(Bulgaria) Elizara Yaneva	(Netherlands) Loes Ebeling Koning	6–3, 6–7^{(1–7)}, 7–6^{(7–5)}
2025 (2)	(Czech Republic) Laura Samson	(Spain) Andrea Lázaro García	6–2, 6–3
2025 (1)	(Bulgaria) Elizara Yaneva	(France) Séléna Janicijevic	7–5, 6–3
2024	(Germany) Ella Seidel	(Germany) Caroline Werner	6–1, 6–4
2023	(Argentina) María Lourdes Carlé	(Turkey) Çağla Büyükakçay	6–1, 6–2
2021–22	Not held		
2020	(Russia) Erika Andreeva	(Slovakia) Sofia Milatová	1–6, 6–0, 6–2

=== Doubles ===
Year	Champions	Runners-up	Score
2026	(Romania) Oana Gavrilă (Greece) Sapfo Sakellaridi	(United States) Julia Adams (Netherlands) Merel Hoedt	6–4, 6–4
2025 (2)	(Bulgaria) Lia Karatancheva (Greece) Sapfo Sakellaridi	(Romania) Elena Ruxandra Bertea; Daria Lodikova	6–7^{(5–7)}, 6–4, [10–5]
2025 (1)	(Bulgaria) Lia Karatancheva (Greece) Sapfo Sakellaridi	(France) Yara Bartashevich; Alevtina Ibragimova	6–2, 7–5
2024	(Slovenia) Veronika Erjavec (Bosnia and Herzegovina) Anita Wagner	(Bulgaria) Lia Karatancheva (Greece) Sapfo Sakellaridi	7–5, 3–6, [10–5]
2023	(Romania) Cristina Dinu (Slovakia) Radka Zelníčková	(Bulgaria) Gergana Topalova (Latvia) Daniela Vismane	1–6, 7–5, [10–6]
2021–22	Not held		
2020	(Romania) Oana Gavrilă (Romania) Oana Georgeta Simion	(Bulgaria) Katerina Dimitrova (United States) Isabelle Kouzmanov	6–7^{(1–7)}, 6–4, [10–4]
