= 2024 Hamburg Open – Men's doubles =

Men's doubles
- 2024 Hamburg Open

Final
- Champions: (Germany) Kevin Krawietz (Germany) Tim Pütz
- Runners-up: (France) Fabien Reboul (France) Édouard Roger-Vasselin
- Score: 7–6^{(10–8)}, 6–2

Details
- Draw: 16
- Seeds: 4

Events
Singles	men	women
Doubles	men	women
← 2023 ·	Hamburg Open	· 2025 →

Defending champions Kevin Krawietz and Tim Pütz defeated Fabien Reboul and Édouard Roger-Vasselin in the final, 7–6^{(10–8)}, 6–2 to win the men's doubles tennis title at the 2024 Hamburg Open.

Matthew Ebden and Rohan Bopanna were separately in contention to regain the ATP No. 1 doubles ranking, but they both lost in the first round.

== Seeds ==
1. (United States) Austin Krajicek / (United States) Rajeev Ram (semifinals)
2. (Germany) Kevin Krawietz / (Germany) Tim Pütz (champions)
3. (France) Fabien Reboul / (France) Édouard Roger-Vasselin (final)
4. (Australia) Matthew Ebden / (Australia) John Peers (first round)
5. (Belgium) Sander Gillé / (Belgium) Joran Vliegen (quarterfinals)
6. (India) Sriram Balaji / (India) Rohan Bopanna(first round)
7. (United Kingdom) Lloyd Glasspool / (Netherlands) Jean-Julien Rojer (quarterfinals)
8. (Austria) Alexander Erler / (Austria) Lucas Miedler (first round)

== Draw ==
=== Key ===
- Q = Qualifier
- WC = Wild card
- LL = Lucky loser
- Alt = Alternate
- ITF = ITF entry
- PR = Protected ranking
- SR = Special ranking
- SE = Special exempt
- JE = Junior exempt
- JR = Junior Accelerator Programme entrant
- CO = College Accelerator Programme entrant
- NG = Next Gen Accelerator Program entrant
- w/o = Walkover
- r = Retired
- d = Defaulted

=== Draw ===
First round
1	(United States) A Krajicek (United States) R Ram	6	7^{8}
(Brazil) T Seyboth Wild (Kazakhstan) A Shevchenko	1	6^{6}
(Italy) F Cobolli (Italy) L Darderi	7^{8}	2	[10]
8	(Austria) A Erler (Austria) L Miedler	6^{6}	6	[6]
3	(France) F Reboul (France) É Roger-Vasselin	6	6
WC	(Jamaica) D Brown (Germany) D Masur	4	3
(Argentina) F Cerúndolo (Spain) P Martínez	4	6^{5}
7	(United Kingdom) L Glasspool (Netherlands) J-J Rojer	6	7^{7}
6	(India) S Balaji (India) R Bopanna	1	4
(Germany) J Schnaitter (Germany) M Wallner	6	6
(Germany) C Frantzen (Germany) H Jebens	4	7^{7}	[10]
4	(Australia) M Ebden (Australia) J Peers	6	6^{5}	[6]
5	(Belgium) S Gillé (Belgium) J Vliegen	6	6
WC	(Germany) D Koepfer (Germany) A Mies	1	2
Q	(India) J Nedunchezhiyan (India) VS Prashanth	1	4
2	(Germany) K Krawietz (Germany) T Pütz	6	6

Quarterfinals
1	(United States) A Krajicek (United States) R Ram	6	6
(Italy) F Cobolli (Italy) L Darderi	4	4
3	(France) F Reboul (France) É Roger-Vasselin	6	3	[10]
7	(United Kingdom) L Glasspool (Netherlands) J-J Rojer	4	6	[6]
(Germany) J Schnaitter (Germany) M Wallner	1	6	[7]
(Germany) C Frantzen (Germany) H Jebens	6	4	[10]
5	(Belgium) S Gillé (Belgium) J Vliegen	5	2
2	(Germany) K Krawietz (Germany) T Pütz	7	6

Semifinals
1	(United States) A Krajicek (United States) R Ram	6^{2}	3
3	(France) F Reboul (France) É Roger-Vasselin	7^{7}	6
(Germany) C Frantzen (Germany) H Jebens	5	3
2	(Germany) K Krawietz (Germany) T Pütz	7	6

Final
3	(France) F Reboul (France) É Roger-Vasselin	6^{8}	2
2	(Germany) K Krawietz (Germany) T Pütz	7^{10}	6

== Qualifying ==
=== Seeds ===
1. (Czech Republic) Petr Nouza / (Czech Republic) Patrik Rikl (first round)
2. (India) Jeevan Nedunchezhiyan / (India) Vijay Sundar Prashanth (qualified)

=== Qualifiers ===
1. (India) Jeevan Nedunchezhiyan / (India) Vijay Sundar Prashanth

=== Qualifying draw ===
First round
1	(Czech Republic) Petr Nouza (Czech Republic) Patrik Rikl	4	4
(Spain) Sergio Martos Gornés (Spain) Jaume Munar	6	6
WC	(Germany) Marvin Möller (Germany) Marko Topo
2	(India) Jeevan Nedunchezhiyan (India) Vijay Sundar Prashanth	w/o

Qualifying competition
(Spain) Sergio Martos Gornés (Spain) Jaume Munar	6	2	[8]
2	(India) Jeevan Nedunchezhiyan (India) Vijay Sundar Prashanth	4	6	[10]
