= 2025 Hamburg Open – Women's singles =

Women's singles
- 2025 Hamburg Open

Final
- Champion: (France) Loïs Boisson
- Runner-up: (Hungary) Anna Bondár
- Score: 7–5, 6–3

Details
- Draw: 32
- Seeds: 8

Events
Singles	men	women
Doubles	men	women
- Hamburg Open

Loïs Boisson defeated defending champion Anna Bondár (from when the event was a WTA 125 tournament) in the final, 7–5, 6–3 to win the women's singles tennis title at the 2025 Hamburg Open. It was her first WTA Tour title.

== Seeds ==
1. Ekaterina Alexandrova (quarterfinals)
2. (Ukraine) Dayana Yastremska (semifinals)
3. (Germany) Tatjana Maria (first round)
4. (Germany) Eva Lys (withdrew)
5. (France) Loïs Boisson (champion)
6. (Japan) Moyuka Uchijima (first round)
7. (Hungary) Anna Bondár (final)
8. (Egypt) Mayar Sherif (first round, retired)

== Draw ==
Key

- Q = Qualifier
- WC = Wild card
- LL = Lucky loser
- Alt = Alternate
- ITF = ITF entry
- PR = Protected ranking
- SR = Special ranking
- SE = Special exempt
- JE = Junior exempt
- JR = Junior Accelerator Programme entrant
- CO = College Accelerator Programme entrant
- NG = Next Gen Accelerator Program entrant
- w/o = Walkover
- r = Retired
- d = Defaulted

=== Finals ===
Semifinals
7	(Hungary) Anna Bondár	5	6	6
PR	(Slovenia) Kaja Juvan	7	3	4
5/WC	(France) Loïs Boisson	6	7^{7}
2	(Ukraine) Dayana Yastremska	1	6^{5}

Final
7	(Hungary) Anna Bondár	5	3
5/WC	(France) Loïs Boisson	7	6

=== Top half ===
First round
1/WC	E Alexandrova	6	6
Q	(Netherlands) E Vedder	0	3
Q	(Germany) C Werner	7^{7}	6
Q	(Germany) V Steiner	6^{4}	2
PR	(Turkey) B Cengiz	6	5	4
(Austria) S Kraus	4	7	6
WC	(Germany) N Noha Akugue	4	6	6^{3}
7	(Hungary) A Bondár	6	3	7^{7}
LL	(Italy) N Fossa Huergo	1	1
(Spain) L Romero Gormaz	6	6
LL	(Burundi) S Nahimana	2	1
(Netherlands) A Rus	6	6
Q	M Timofeeva	6^{4}	1
PR	(Slovenia) K Juvan	7^{7}	6
(United States) L Chirico	4	7	3
8	(Egypt) M Sherif	6	5	0^{r}

Second round
1/WC	E Alexandrova	6	6
Q	(Germany) C Werner	2	2
(Austria) S Kraus	3	2
7	(Hungary) A Bondár	6	6
(Spain) L Romero Gormaz	6	6
(Netherlands) A Rus	2	2
PR	(Slovenia) K Juvan	4	6	6
(United States) L Chirico	6	4	1

Quarterfinals
1/WC	E Alexandrova	7^{7}	3	6^{4}
7	(Hungary) A Bondár	6^{1}	6	7^{7}
(Spain) L Romero Gormaz	4	7^{7}	4
PR	(Slovenia) K Juvan	6	6^{5}	6

Semifinals
7	(Hungary) A Bondár	5	6	6
PR	(Slovenia) K Juvan	7	3	4

=== Bottom half ===
First round
5/WC	(France) L Boisson	6	6
(Austria) J Grabher	1	3
(Cyprus) R Șerban	4	3
(Germany) T Korpatsch	6	6
(Australia) A Sharma	7^{7}	3	6
Q	(Spain) A Geerlings	6^{4}	6	2
(Bulgaria) V Tomova	6	7^{7}
3	(Germany) T Maria	3	6^{5}
6	(Japan) M Uchijima	5	3
WC	(Germany) N Schunk	7	6
Q	(Serbia) A Krunić	4	1
(Hungary) D Gálfi	6	6
(Croatia) T Würth	6^{9}	6	5
(France) D Parry	7^{11}	3	7
(Germany) J Niemeier	4	3
2	(Ukraine) D Yastremska	6	6

Second round
5/WC	(France) L Boisson	6	6^{3}	6
(Germany) T Korpatsch	4	7^{7}	4
(Australia) A Sharma	1	1
(Bulgaria) V Tomova	6	6
WC	(Germany) N Schunk	6	3	2
(Hungary) D Gálfi	1	6	6
(France) D Parry	1	4
2	(Ukraine) D Yastremska	6	6

Quarterfinals
5/WC	(France) L Boisson	6	6
(Bulgaria) V Tomova	3	3
(Hungary) D Gálfi	6^{1}	6	2
2	(Ukraine) D Yastremska	7^{7}	3	6

Semifinals
5/WC	(France) L Boisson	6	7^{7}
2	(Ukraine) D Yastremska	1	6^{5}

== Qualifying ==
=== Seeds ===
1. (Spain) Carlota Martínez Círez (first round)
2. (Burundi) Sada Nahimana (qualifying competition, lucky loser)
3. (Ukraine) Valeriya Strakhova (withdrew)
4. (Romania) Irina Bara (first round)
5. (Netherlands) Eva Vedder (qualified)
6. Maria Timofeeva (qualified)
7. (Italy) Nicole Fossa Huergo (qualifying competition, lucky loser)
8. (Germany) Caroline Werner (qualified)
9. (Croatia) Tena Lukas (first round)
10. (Kazakhstan) Zhibek Kulambayeva (qualifying competition)
11. (Slovakia) Renáta Jamrichová (first round)
12. (Spain) Ariana Geerlings (qualified)

=== Qualifiers ===
1. (Serbia) Aleksandra Krunić
2. (Germany) Valentina Steiner
3. (Spain) Ariana Geerlings
4. (Germany) Caroline Werner
5. (Netherlands) Eva Vedder
6. Maria Timofeeva

=== Lucky losers ===
1. (Burundi) Sada Nahimana
2. (Italy) Nicole Fossa Huergo

=== Qualifying draw ===
==== First qualifier ====
First round
1	(Spain) Carlota Martínez Círez	4	3
WC	(Germany) Anna Petkovic	6	6
(Serbia) Aleksandra Krunić	6	6
9	(Croatia) Tena Lukas	4	2

Qualifying competition
WC	(Germany) Anna Petkovic	6	2	6^{5}
(Serbia) Aleksandra Krunić	4	6	7^{7}

==== Second qualifier ====
First round
2	(Burundi) Sada Nahimana	6	6
Alt	(Czech Republic) Michaela Bayerlová	3	4
WC	(Germany) Valentina Steiner	6	6
11	(Slovakia) Renáta Jamrichová	2	4

Qualifying competition
2	(Burundi) Sada Nahimana	3	2
WC	(Germany) Valentina Steiner	6	6

==== Third qualifier ====
First round
Alt	(Ukraine) Nadiya Kolb	2	2
(Estonia) Elena Malõgina	6	6
(Georgia (country)) Sofia Shapatava	7^{7}	2	3
12	(Spain) Ariana Geerlings	6^{5}	6	6

Qualifying competition
(Estonia) Elena Malõgina	3	2
12	(Spain) Ariana Geerlings	6	6

==== Fourth qualifier ====
First round
4	(Romania) Irina Bara	6	1	3
WC	(Germany) Tessa Johanna Brockmann	4	6	6
(Bulgaria) Gergana Topalova	3	2
8	(Germany) Caroline Werner	6	6

Qualifying competition
WC	(Germany) Tessa Johanna Brockmann	5	5
8	(Germany) Caroline Werner	7	7

==== Fifth qualifier ====
First round
5	(Netherlands) Eva Vedder	6	6^{2}	6
WC	(Germany) Sonja Zhenikhova	4	7^{7}	4
(Italy) Diletta Cherubini	6^{4}	7^{7}	4
7	(Italy) Nicole Fossa Huergo	7^{7}	6^{0}	6

Qualifying competition
5	(Netherlands) Eva Vedder	6	6
7	(Italy) Nicole Fossa Huergo	3	3

==== Sixth qualifier ====
First round
6	Maria Timofeeva	6	6
Ekaterina Yashina	0	2
(Germany) Mina Hodzic	4	5
10	(Kazakhstan) Zhibek Kulambayeva	6	7

Qualifying competition
6	Maria Timofeeva	6	6
10	(Kazakhstan) Zhibek Kulambayeva	1	2
