= 2025 Hamburg Open – Men's doubles =

Men's doubles
- 2025 Hamburg Open

Final
- Champions: (Italy) Simone Bolelli (Italy) Andrea Vavassori
- Runners-up: (Argentina) Andrés Molteni (Brazil) Fernando Romboli
- Score: 6–4, 6–0

Details
- Draw: 16
- Seeds: 4

Events
Singles	men	women
Doubles	men	women
← 2024 ·	Hamburg Open	· 2026 →

Simone Bolelli and Andrea Vavassori defeated Andrés Molteni and Fernando Romboli in the final, 6–4, 6–0 to win the men's doubles tennis title at the 2025 Hamburg Open.

Kevin Krawietz and Tim Pütz were the two-time defending champions, but they withdrew from their quarterfinal match.

== Seeds ==
1. (Finland) Harri Heliövaara / (United Kingdom) Henry Patten (semifinals)
2. (Germany) Kevin Krawietz / (Germany) Tim Pütz (quarterfinals, withdrew)
3. (Italy) Simone Bolelli / (Italy) Andrea Vavassori (champions)
4. (Croatia) Nikola Mektić / (New Zealand) Michael Venus (first round)

== Draw ==
Key

- Q = Qualifier
- WC = Wild card
- LL = Lucky loser
- Alt = Alternate
- ITF = ITF entry
- PR = Protected ranking
- SR = Special ranking
- SE = Special exempt
- JE = Junior exempt
- JR = Junior Accelerator Programme entrant
- CO = College Accelerator Programme entrant
- NG = Next Gen Accelerator Program entrant
- w/o = Walkover
- r = Retired
- d = Defaulted

=== Draw ===
First round
1	(Finland) H Heliövaara (United Kingdom) H Patten	7^{11}	5	[10]
(Belgium) S Gillé (Poland) J Zieliński	6^{9}	7	[8]
WC	(Germany) J Engel (Germany) MH Rehberg	6^{4}	6	[10]
(United States) N Lammons (United States) J Withrow	7^{7}	4	[5]
4	(Croatia) N Mektić (New Zealand) M Venus	3	3
Q	(Netherlands) S Arends (United Kingdom) L Johnson	6	6
(Sweden) A Göransson (Netherlands) S Verbeek	6^{4}	4
(Argentina) A Molteni (Brazil) F Romboli	7^{7}	6
(United Kingdom) J Murray (United States) R Ram	4	6	[10]
WC	(Germany) A Mies (Germany) P Zahraj	6	3	[7]
(United Kingdom) J Cash (United Kingdom) L Glasspool	5	2
3	(Italy) S Bolelli (Italy) A Vavassori	7	6
(France) M Guinard (Monaco) H Nys	3	4
(United Kingdom) J Salisbury (United Kingdom) N Skupski	6	6
(United States) C Harrison (United States) E King	5	7^{8}	[8]
2	(Germany) K Krawietz (Germany) T Pütz	7	6^{6}	[10]

Quarterfinals
1	(Finland) H Heliövaara (United Kingdom) H Patten	6	6
WC	(Germany) J Engel (Germany) MH Rehberg	1	2
Q	(Netherlands) S Arends (United Kingdom) L Johnson	2	2
(Argentina) A Molteni (Brazil) F Romboli	6	6
(United Kingdom) J Murray (United States) R Ram	2	6	[5]
3	(Italy) S Bolelli (Italy) A Vavassori	6	3	[10]
(United Kingdom) J Salisbury (United Kingdom) N Skupski	w/o
2	(Germany) K Krawietz (Germany) T Pütz

Semifinals
1	(Finland) H Heliövaara (United Kingdom) H Patten	6	1	[10]
(Argentina) A Molteni (Brazil) F Romboli	1	6	[12]
3	(Italy) S Bolelli (Italy) A Vavassori	6	6
(United Kingdom) J Salisbury (United Kingdom) N Skupski	3	1

Final
(Argentina) A Molteni (Brazil) F Romboli	4	0
3	(Italy) S Bolelli (Italy) A Vavassori	6	6

== Qualifying ==
=== Seeds ===
1. (Netherlands) Sander Arends / (United Kingdom) Luke Johnson (qualified)
2. (Netherlands) Robin Haase / (Germany) Hendrik Jebens (withdrew, still playing in Turin)

=== Qualifiers ===
1. (Netherlands) Sander Arends / (United Kingdom) Luke Johnson

=== Qualifying draw ===
First round
1	(Netherlands) Sander Arends (United Kingdom) Luke Johnson	5	7^{10}	[10]
Alt	(France) Grégoire Jacq (Australia) Matthew Romios	7	6^{8}	[8]
WC	(Germany) Aaron Funk (Germany) Vincent Marysko	3	5
Alt	(Czech Republic) Petr Nouza (Czech Republic) Patrik Rikl	6	7

Qualifying competition
1	(Netherlands) Sander Arends (United Kingdom) Luke Johnson	7^{7}	6
Alt	(Czech Republic) Petr Nouza (Czech Republic) Patrik Rikl	6^{4}	4
