= 2025 Hamburg Open – Women's doubles =

Women's doubles
- 2025 Hamburg Open

Final
- Champions: (Ukraine) Nadiia Kichenok (Japan) Makoto Ninomiya
- Runners-up: (Hungary) Anna Bondár (Netherlands) Arantxa Rus
- Score: 6–4, 3–6, [11–9]

Details
- Draw: 16
- Seeds: 4

Events
Singles	men	women
Doubles	men	women
- Hamburg Open

Nadiia Kichenok and Makoto Ninomiya defeated defending champion Anna Bondár and her partner Arantxa Rus in the final, 6–4, 3–6, [11–9]. to win the women's doubles tennis title at the 2025 Hamburg Open. It was Kichenok's tenth WTA Tour title, and Ninomiya's eighth.

Bondár and Kimberley Zimmermann were the reigning champions (where the tournament was a WTA 125 tournament the previous year), but Zimmermann chose to compete in Iași instead.

== Seeds ==
1. (Ukraine) Nadiia Kichenok / (Japan) Makoto Ninomiya (champion)
2. (Czech Republic) Jesika Malečková / (Czech Republic) Miriam Škoch (first round)
3. (Japan) Moyuka Uchijima / (China) Zheng Saisai (semifinals)
4. (Kazakhstan) Zhibek Kulambayeva / (United Kingdom) Maia Lumsden (first round)

== Draw ==
Key

- Q = Qualifier
- WC = Wild card
- LL = Lucky loser
- Alt = Alternate
- ITF = ITF entry
- PR = Protected ranking
- SR = Special ranking
- SE = Special exempt
- JE = Junior exempt
- JR = Junior Accelerator Programme entrant
- CO = College Accelerator Programme entrant
- NG = Next Gen Accelerator Program entrant
- w/o = Walkover
- r = Retired
- d = Defaulted

=== Draw ===
First round
1	(Ukraine) N Kichenok (Japan) M Ninomiya	6	6
WC	(Germany) N Noha Akugue (Germany) N Schunk	3	2
(Romania) I Bara (Cyprus) R Șerban	7^{7}	6
(Turkey) B Cengiz; E Yashina	6^{5}	4
3	(Japan) M Uchijima (China) S Zheng	3	6	[10]
(Italy) N Fossa Huergo (Belgium) M Kempen	6	3	[5]
(Czech Republic) M Bayerlová (Croatia) T Würth	6^{4}	3
WC	(Germany) TJ Brockmann (Germany) S Zhenikhova	7^{7}	6
(Venezuela) A Gámiz (Netherlands) E Vedder	6	6
(Ukraine) M Kolb (Ukraine) N Kolb	2	3
(Austria) J Grabher (Austria) S Kraus	6	6
4	(Kazakhstan) Z Kulambayeva (United Kingdom) M Lumsden	3	3
(United States) S Santamaria (Bulgaria) V Tomova	6	6
(Italy) A Moratelli (Spain) L Romero Gormaz	4	2
(Hungary) A Bondár (Netherlands) A Rus	7	2	[10]
2	(Czech Republic) J Malečková (Czech Republic) M Škoch	5	6	[4]

Quarterfinals
1	(Ukraine) N Kichenok (Japan) M Ninomiya	6	7
(Romania) I Bara (Cyprus) R Șerban	4	5
3	(Japan) M Uchijima (China) S Zheng	7^{7}	6
WC	(Germany) TJ Brockmann (Germany) S Zhenikhova	6^{4}	3
(Venezuela) A Gámiz (Netherlands) E Vedder	5	1
(Austria) J Grabher (Austria) S Kraus	7	6
(United States) S Santamaria (Bulgaria) V Tomova	4	6^{3}
(Hungary) A Bondár (Netherlands) A Rus	6	7^{7}

Semifinals
1	(Ukraine) N Kichenok (Japan) M Ninomiya	6	5	[10]
3	(Japan) M Uchijima (China) S Zheng	3	7	[8]
(Austria) J Grabher (Austria) S Kraus	6	6^{3}	[5]
(Hungary) A Bondár (Netherlands) A Rus	4	7^{7}	[10]

Final
1	(Ukraine) N Kichenok (Japan) M Ninomiya	6	3	[11]
(Hungary) A Bondár (Netherlands) A Rus	4	6	[9]
