= 2023 Hamburg European Open – Men's singles =

Men's singles
- 2023 Hamburg European Open

Final
- Champion: (Germany) Alexander Zverev
- Runner-up: (Serbia) Laslo Djere
- Score: 7–5, 6–3

Details
- Draw: 32 (4Q / 3WC)
- Seeds: 8

Events
Singles	men	women
Doubles	men	women
- Hamburg European Open

Alexander Zverev defeated Laslo Djere in the final, 7–5, 6–3 to win the men's singles tennis title at the 2023 Hamburg European Open in his hometown of Hamburg.

Lorenzo Musetti was the defending champion, but lost to Djere in the quarterfinals.

== Seeds ==
1. (Norway) Casper Ruud (quarterfinals)
2. Andrey Rublev (second round)
3. (Italy) Lorenzo Musetti (quarterfinals)
4. (Germany) Alexander Zverev (champion)
5. (Argentina) Francisco Cerúndolo (first round, retired)
6. (Argentina) Tomás Martín Etcheverry (first round)
7. (Spain) Alejandro Davidovich Fokina (second round)
8. (Serbia) Miomir Kecmanović (first round)

== Draw ==
Key

- Q = Qualifier
- WC = Wild card
- LL = Lucky loser
- Alt = Alternate
- ITF = ITF entry
- PR = Protected ranking
- SR = Special ranking
- SE = Special exempt
- JE = Junior exempt
- JR = Junior Accelerator Programme entrant
- CO = College Accelerator Programme entrant
- NG = Next Gen Accelerator Program entrant
- w/o = Walkover
- r = Retired
- d = Defaulted

=== Finals ===
Semifinals
(France) Arthur Fils	2	4
4	(Germany) Alexander Zverev	6	6
(Serbia) Laslo Djere	6	6
(China) Zhang Zhizhen	3	2

Final
4	(Germany) Alexander Zverev	7	6
(Serbia) Laslo Djere	5	3

=== Top half ===
First round
1	(Norway) C Ruud	6	1	6
(Argentina) S Báez	3	6	3
PR	(Bolivia) H Dellien	7^{7}	1	3
Q	(Chile) C Garín	6^{3}	6	6
(France) A Fils	7	7
LL	(Colombia) DE Galán	5	5
(Serbia) D Lajović	3	6	6
8	(Serbia) M Kecmanović	6	4	3
4	(Germany) A Zverev	6	6
(Slovakia) A Molčan	0	3
WC	(Germany) M Marterer	7^{7}	6
WC	(Germany) R Molleker	6^{2}	2
(France) L Van Assche	7^{7}	6
(France) A Müller	6^{3}	4
(Argentina) P Cachin	6	5	2
7	(Spain) A Davidovich Fokina	2	7	6

Second round
1	(Norway) C Ruud	1	6	6
Q	(Chile) C Garín	6	2	2
(France) A Fils	7	7
(Serbia) D Lajović	5	5
4	(Germany) A Zverev	6	7
WC	(Germany) M Marterer	3	5
(France) L Van Assche	3	7^{7}	6
7	(Spain) A Davidovich Fokina	6	6^{5}	4

Quarterfinals
1	(Norway) C Ruud	0	4
(France) A Fils	6	6
4	(Germany) A Zverev	6	6
(France) L Van Assche	3	4

Semifinals
(France) A Fils	2	4
4	(Germany) A Zverev	6	6

=== Bottom half ===
First round
6	(Argentina) TM Etcheverry	6^{2}	3
(Serbia) L Djere	7^{7}	6
LL	(Brazil) T Monteiro	3	6	4
PR	(Argentina) G Pella	6	4	6
Q	(Brazil) T Seyboth Wild	6^{6}	4
LL	(Slovakia) J Kovalík	7^{8}	6
Q	(Sweden) E Ymer	4	1
3	(Italy) L Musetti	6	6
5	(Argentina) F Cerúndolo	6	2	2^{r}
(Germany) Y Hanfmann	4	6	4
Q	(United Kingdom) J Choinski	4	5
(China) Z Zhang	6	7
(Germany) D Altmaier	7	6
(France) R Gasquet	5	4
(Spain) B Zapata Miralles	7	1	6^{7}
2/WC	A Rublev	5	6	7^{9}

Second round
(Serbia) L Djere	6	3	6
PR	(Argentina) G Pella	2	6	3
LL	(Slovakia) J Kovalík	6	2	4
3	(Italy) L Musetti	3	6	6
(Germany) Y Hanfmann	6	1	4
(China) Z Zhang	4	6	6
(Germany) D Altmaier	6	6
2/WC	A Rublev	2	2

Quarterfinals
(Serbia) L Djere	7	6
3	(Italy) L Musetti	5	3
(China) Z Zhang	6	6
(Germany) D Altmaier	4	4

Semifinals
(Serbia) L Djere	6	6
(China) Z Zhang	3	2

== Qualifying ==
=== Seeds ===
1. (Colombia) Daniel Elahi Galán (qualifying competition, lucky loser)
2. Pavel Kotov (first round)
3. (Chile) Cristian Garín (qualified)
4. (Brazil) Thiago Seyboth Wild (qualified)
5. (Brazil) Thiago Monteiro (qualifying competition, lucky loser)
6. (Argentina) Thiago Agustín Tirante (first round)
7. (United Kingdom) Jan Choinski (qualified)
8. Ivan Gakhov (first round)

=== Qualifiers ===
1. (United Kingdom) Jan Choinski
2. (Sweden) Elias Ymer
3. (Chile) Cristian Garín
4. (Brazil) Thiago Seyboth Wild

=== Lucky losers ===
1. (Colombia) Daniel Elahi Galán
2. (Brazil) Thiago Monteiro
3. (Slovakia) Jozef Kovalík

=== Qualifying draw ===
==== First qualifier ====
First round
1	(Colombia) Daniel Elahi Galán	4	7^{7}	6
WC	(Germany) Max Hans Rehberg	6	6^{5}	3
WC	(Germany) Marvin Möller	3	4
7	(United Kingdom) Jan Choinski	6	6

Qualifying competition
1	(Colombia) Daniel Elahi Galán	1	6	4
7	(United Kingdom) Jan Choinski	6	4	6

==== Second qualifier ====
First round
2	Pavel Kotov	3	7	4
(Slovakia) Jozef Kovalík	6	5	6
(Sweden) Elias Ymer	6	6
8	Ivan Gakhov	3	2

Qualifying competition
(Slovakia) Jozef Kovalík	3	3
(Sweden) Elias Ymer	6	6

==== Third qualifier ====
First round
3	(Chile) Cristian Garín	6	6
WC	(Germany) Marko Topo	3	4
(Belgium) Kimmer Coppejans	6	7^{7}
6	(Argentina) Thiago Agustín Tirante	1	6^{4}

Qualifying competition
3	(Chile) Cristian Garín	2	6	7^{7}
(Belgium) Kimmer Coppejans	6	3	6^{5}

==== Fourth qualifier ====
First round
4	(Brazil) Thiago Seyboth Wild	6	6
(Argentina) Andrea Collarini	4	4
Alt	(Argentina) Renzo Olivo	6^{2}	0^{r}
5	(Brazil) Thiago Monteiro	7^{7}	0

Qualifying competition
4	(Brazil) Thiago Seyboth Wild	6	6
5	(Brazil) Thiago Monteiro	4	3
