= Anita Wagner =

Bosnian tennis player (born 1994)

- Country (sports): Bosnia and Herzegovina
- Born: 27 June 1994 (age 32) Tuzla, Bosnia and Herzegovina
- Prize money: $90,976

Singles
- Career record: 132–161
- Career titles: 0
- Highest ranking: No. 633 (16 December 2013)

Doubles
- Career record: 276–262
- Career titles: 18 ITF
- Highest ranking: No. 158 (31 March 2025)
- Current ranking: No. 328 (27 July 2026)

Team competitions
- Fed Cup: 17–37
- Last updated on: 4 August 2026.

Anita Wagner (née Husarić; Bosnian pronunciation: [ǎnita xǔsaritɕ, ǎniː-]; born 27 June 1994) is a Bosnian tennis player.

She has won 18 doubles titles on the ITF Women's Circuit. On 31 March 2025, she peaked at No. 158 in the WTA doubles rankings.

Playing for Bosnia and Herzegovina Fed Cup team, Husarić has a win–loss record of 17–37, as of August 2026.

She has been married to Sebastian Wagner since October 2021, and in January 2022 changed her name to Anita Wagner.

== ITF Circuit finals ==
=== Doubles: 46 (18 titles, 28 runner-ups) ===
Legend W100 tournaments W60/75 tournaments W50 tournaments W25/35 tournaments W10/15 tournaments	Finals by surface Hard (5–8) Clay (13–20)

Result	W–L	Date	Tournament	Tier	Surface	Partner	Opponents	Score
Win	1–0	Nov 2011	ITF Monastir, Tunisia	W10	Hard	(Bulgaria) Viktoriya Tomova	(Ukraine) Anastasia Kharchenko (United States) Nicole Melichar	6–3, 5–7, [10–5]
Loss	1–1	Jul 2013	ITF Iași, Romania	W10	Clay	(Ukraine) Kateryna Sliusar	(Romania) Irina Bara (Romania) Diana Buzean	2–6, 1–6
Loss	1–2	Sep 2013	ITF Sarajevo, BiH	W15	Clay	(Austria) Lisa-Maria Moser	(Slovakia) Vivien Juhászová (Czech Republic) Tereza Malíková	4–6, 1–6
Loss	1–3	Nov 2013	ITF Antalya, Turkey	W10	Clay	(Belgium) Kimberley Zimmermann	(Serbia) Natalija Kostić (Slovakia) Karin Morgošová	6–7^{(2)}, 4–6
Win	2–3	Feb 2014	ITF Antalya, Turkey	W10	Clay	(Ukraine) Alyona Sotnikova	(Romania) Laura Ioana Andrei (Belarus) Sviatlana Pirazhenka	5–7, 6–4, [10–6]
Win	3–3	May 2014	ITF Antalya, Turkey	W10	Hard	(Italy) Francesca Palmigiano	(Mexico) Ximena Hermoso (Romania) Daiana Negreanu	w/o
Win	4–3	May 2014	ITF Tarsus, Turkey	W10	Clay	(Belgium) Kimberley Zimmermann	(Russia) Anastasia Pivovarova (Turkey) Melis Sezer	6–4, 6–2
Loss	4–4	Jun 2014	ITF Banja Luka, BiH	W10	Clay	(Romania) Daiana Negreanu	(Czech Republic) Gabriela Pantůčková (Czech Republic) Barbora Štefková	w/o
Win	5–4	Aug 2014	ITF Brčko, BiH	W10	Clay	(Bosnia and Herzegovina) Ema Burgić	(Germany) Ina Kaufinger (Czech Republic) Natálie Novotná	6–1, 6–4
Loss	5–5	Oct 2014	ITF Heraklion, Greece	W10	Hard	(France) Laëtitia Sarrazin	(Japan) Yumi Nakano (Bulgaria) Julia Stamatova	1–6, 2–6
Loss	5–6	Nov 2014	ITF Heraklion, Greece	W10	Hard	(France) Marine Partaud	(Poland) Natalia Siedliska (Germany) Julia Wachaczyk	2–6, 7–6^{(2)}, [6–10]
Win	6–6	Jan 2015	ITF Antalya, Turkey	W10	Clay	(United States) Danielle Mills	(Germany) Anne Schäfer (Slovakia) Lenka Wienerová	6–4, 4–6, [12–10]
Win	7–6	Feb 2015	ITF Antalya, Turkey	W10	Clay	(Belgium) Kimberley Zimmermann	(Turkey) Başak Eraydın (Italy) Verena Meliss	6–0, 6–3
Win	8–6	May 2015	ITF Antalya, Turkey	W10	Hard	(Ukraine) Alyona Sotnikova	(Romania) Nicoleta Dascălu (Italy) Camilla Rosatello	6–1, 6–2
Win	9–6	Jun 2015	ITF Banja Luka, BiH	W10	Clay	(France) Laëtitia Sarrazin	(Serbia) Nikolina Jović (Bosnia and Herzegovina) Jasmina Tinjić	6–2, 6–0
Win	10–6	Aug 2015	ITF Innsbruck, Austria	W10	Clay	(Russia) Daria Lodikova	(Austria) Natasha Bredl (Austria) Nikola Hofmanova	6–4, 4–6, [10–7]
Loss	10–7	Sep 2015	ITF Brčko, BiH	W10	Clay	(Austria) Janina Toljan	(Hungary) Ágnes Bukta (Slovakia) Vivien Juhászová	7–5, 4–6, [8–10]
Loss	10–8	Sep 2015	ITF Antalya, Turkey	W10	Hard	(Turkey) Ayla Aksu	(Slovakia) Vivien Juhászová (Belarus) Aryna Sabalenka	1–6, 3–6
Win	11–8	May 2016	ITF Antalya, Turkey	W10	Hard	(Colombia) Yuliana Lizarazo	(United Kingdom) Francesca Stephenson (Netherlands) Erika Vogelsang	4–6, 6–4, [10–3]
Loss	11–9	Jun 2016	ITF Braunschweig, Germany	W25	Clay	(Serbia) Nina Stojanović	(Germany) Katharina Gerlach (Germany) Katharina Hobgarski	4–6, 3–6
Loss	11–10	Jul 2016	ITF Darmstadt, Germany	W25	Clay	(Slovenia) Dalila Jakupović	(Greece) Valentini Grammatikopoulou (Russia) Anna Kalinskaya	4–6, 1–6
Loss	11–11	Jul 2016	ITF Horb, Germany	W25	Clay	(Ukraine) Oleksandra Korashvili	(Netherlands) Richèl Hogenkamp (Netherlands) Lesley Kerkhove	1–6, 6–7^{(2)}
Loss	11–12	Aug 2016	ITF Nuremberg, Germany	W10	Clay	(Germany) Katharina Hobgarski	(United States) Dasha Ivanova (Czech Republic) Petra Krejsová	7–5, 1–6, [8–10]
Win	12–12	Sep 2016	Royal Cup, Montenegro	W25	Clay	(Netherlands) Quirine Lemoine	(Serbia) Ivana Jorović (Switzerland) Xenia Knoll	3–6, 6–4, [10–4]
Loss	12–13	Jan 2017	ITF Stuttgart, Germany	W15	Hard (i)	(Belgium) Kimberley Zimmermann	(Czech Republic) Miriam Kolodziejová (Czech Republic) Markéta Vondroušová	6–7^{(3)}, 5–7
Loss	12–14	Jun 2017	Bredeney Ladies Open, Germany	W25	Clay	(Belgium) Kimberley Zimmermann	(Germany) Carolin Daniels (Belarus) Lidziya Marozava	1–6, 4–6
Loss	12–15	Oct 2017	ITF Santa Margherita di Pula, Italy	W25	Clay	(Romania) Elena Bogdan	(Romania) Cristina Dinu (Italy) Camilla Rosatello	2–6, 1–6
Loss	12–16	Jul 2018	ITF Stuttgart, Germany	W25	Clay	(Australia) Tammi Patterson	(Romania) Irina Fetecău (Venezuela) Aymet Uzcátegui	2–6, 6–3, [4–10]
Loss	12–17	Dec 2020	ITF Monastir, Tunisia	W15	Hard	(Bosnia and Herzegovina) Nefisa Berberović	(Spain) Yvonne Cavallé Reimers (Serbia) Bojana Marinković	1–6, 4–6
Win	13–17	Dec 2020	ITF Monastir, Tunisia	W15	Hard	(Bosnia and Herzegovina) Nefisa Berberović	(Spain) Celia Cerviño Ruiz (Denmark) Olivia Gram	6–4, 6–4
Loss	13–18	Jan 2021	ITF Cairo, Egypt	W15	Clay	(Bosnia and Herzegovina) Dea Herdželaš	(Netherlands) Quirine Lemoine (Netherlands) Gabriella Mujan	6–4, 3–6, [6–10]
Loss	13–19	Aug 2021	ITF Warmbad-Villach, Austria	W15	Clay	(Russia) Aleksandra Pospelova	(Italy) Melania Delai (Slovenia) Pia Lovrič	6–0, 2–6, [3–10]
Loss	13–20	Jun 2022	ITF Denain, France	W25	Clay	(Latvia) Kamilla Bartone	(Germany) Katharina Hobgarski (Ukraine) Valeriya Strakhova	0–6, 4–6
Loss	13–21	Sep 2022	ITF Santa Margherita di Pula, Italy	W25	Clay	(China) Lu Jiajing	(Kazakhstan) Zhibek Kulambayeva (Latvia) Darja Semenistaja	2–6, 2–6
Loss	13–22	Mar 2023	Open de Touraine, France	W25	Hard (i)	(United States) Chiara Scholl	(Slovenia) Veronika Erjavec (Lithuania) Justina Mikulskytė	4–6, 0–6
Loss	13–23	May 2023	ITF Santa Margherita di Pula, Italy	W25	Clay	(Netherlands) Lexie Stevens	(Romania) Oana Gavrilă (Greece) Sapfo Sakellaridi	1–6, 1–6
Loss	13–24	Jul 2023	ITF Tarvisio, Italy	W25	Clay	(Slovenia) Nika Radišić	(Slovenia) Veronika Erjavec (Czech Republic) Dominika Šalková	0–6, 3–6
Win	14–24	Aug 2023	ITF Erwitte, Germany	W25	Clay	(Slovenia) Nika Radišić	Ekaterina Ovcharenko (Hungary) Amarissa Tóth	7–5, 7–6^{(4)}
Win	15–24	Aug 2023	ITF Trieste, Italy	W25	Clay	(Slovenia) Nika Radišić	(Croatia) Mariana Dražić; Anastasia Gasanova	6–1, 6–1
Loss	15–25	Oct 2023	ITF Santa Margherita di Pula, Italy	W25	Clay	(Slovenia) Nika Radišić	(Italy) Martina Colmegna (Italy) Lisa Pigato	4–6, 5–7
Loss	15–26	Oct 2023	ITF Istanbul, Turkey	W25	Hard (i)	(Slovenia) Dalila Jakupović	Ekaterina Yashina; Anastasia Zakharova	3–6, 4–6
Win	16–26	Mar 2024	ITF Terrassa, Spain	W35	Clay	(Slovenia) Nika Radišić	(Spain) Yvonne Cavallé Reimers (India) Vasanti Shinde	7–5, 7–6^{(7)}
Loss	16–27	May 2024	Wiesbaden Open, Germany	W100	Clay	(Japan) Himeno Sakatsume	(Brazil) Laura Pigossi (United Kingdom) Samantha Murray Sharan	5–7, 2–6
Win	17–27	Aug 2024	ITF Trieste, Italy	W35	Clay	(Italy) Anastasia Abbagnato	(Slovenia) Živa Falkner (Hungary) Amarissa Tóth	6–3, 4–6, [11–9]
Win	18–27	Sep 2024	Pazardzhik Cup, Bulgaria	W75	Clay	(Slovenia) Veronika Erjavec	(Bulgaria) Lia Karatancheva (Greece) Sapfo Sakellaridi	7–5, 3–6, [10–5]
Loss	18–28	Feb 2026	Porto Indoor, Portugal	W50	Hard (i)	(Germany) Noma Noha Akugue	(Spain) Ángela Fita Boluda (Switzerland) Ylena In-Albon	4–6, 6–7^{(5)}
