= Valentina Steiner =

German tennis player (born 2006)

- Country (sports): Germany
- Born: 19 July 2006 (age 20) Remseck, Germany
- Plays: Right-handed (two-handed backhand)
- Prize money: $58,119

Singles
- Career record: 96–58
- Career titles: 3 ITF
- Highest ranking: No. 359 (19 October 2026)
- Current ranking: No. 364 (26 October 2026)

Doubles
- Career record: 15–11
- Career titles: 2 ITF
- Highest ranking: No. 546 (26 October 2026)
- Current ranking: No. 546 (26 October 2026)
- Last updated on: 26 October 2026.

Valentina Steiner (born 19 July 2006) is a German tennis player.

Steiner has a career-high WTA singles ranking of world No. 359, achieved on 19 October 2026 and a best doubles ranking of No. 546, attained on 26 October 2026.

== Career ==
Ranked No. 692, Steiner made her WTA Tour main-draw debut at the 2025 Hamburg Open as a qualifier. She lost to fellow German Caroline Werner in the first round. Both Werner and Steiner were making their WTA Tour main-draw debuts in the match.

== ITF Circuit finals ==
=== Singles: 5 (3 titles, 2 runner-ups) ===
| Legend W35 tournaments (1–0) W15 tournaments (2–2) | Finals by surface Hard (0–0) Clay (3–2) |

| Result | W–L | Date | Tournament | Tier | Surface | Opponent | Score |
|---|---|---|---|---|---|---|---|
| Loss | 0–1 | May 2025 | ITF Shymkent, Kazakhstan | W15 | Clay | Valeriya Yushchenko | 6–2, 0–6, 4–6 |
| Loss | 0–2 | Jun 2025 | ITF Merzig, Germany | W15 | Clay | (Germany) Tessa Johanna Brockmann | 4–6, 0–6 |
| Win | 1–2 | May 2026 | ITF Reichstett, France | W15 | Clay | (Croatia) Iva Primorac Pavičić | 6–3, 4–6, 6–0 |
| Win | 2–2 | Jun 2026 | ITF Merzig, Germany | W15 | Clay | (Belgium) Tamila Gadamauri | 6–1, 6–0 |
| Win | 3–2 | Aug 2026 | ITF Erwitte, Germany | W35 | Clay | (Germany) Josy Daems | 3–6, 6–1, 6–3 |

=== Doubles: 3 (2 titles, 1 runner-up) ===
| Legend W50 tournaments (1–0) W15 tournaments (1–1) | Finals by surface Hard (1–0) Clay (1–1) |

| Result | W–L | Date | Tournament | Tier | Surface | Partner | Opponents | Score |
|---|---|---|---|---|---|---|---|---|
| Loss | 0–1 | May 2026 | ITF Szentendre, Hungary | W15 | Clay | (Germany) Sonja Zhenikhova | (Argentina) Ana Gobbi Monllau (Colombia) Mariana Higuita | 6–0, 4–6, [7–10] |
| Win | 1–1 | Jun 2026 | ITF Merzig, Germany | W15 | Clay | (United States) Mia Slama | (Ukraine) Anastasiia Firman (Ukraine) Daria Yesypchuk | 6–3, 6–4 |
| Win | 2–1 | Oct 2026 | ITF Cherbourg, France | W50 | Hard (i) | (Germany) Nastasja Schunk | (China) Feng Shuo (China) Li Zongyu | 7–6^{(7–2)}, 6–4 |
