= Caroline Werner =

German tennis player (born 1996)

Carolina Werner
- Werner at the 2026 Wimbledon Championships
- Country (sports): Germany
- Born: 8 April 1996 (age 30) Karlsruhe, Germany
- Plays: Right-handed (two-handed backhand)
- Prize money: $132,900

Singles
- Career record: 292–219
- Career titles: 1 ITF
- Highest ranking: No. 221 (25 May 2026)
- Current ranking: No. 239 (15 June 2026)

Grand Slam singles results
- Wimbledon: Q2 (2026)

Doubles
- Career record: 65–63
- Career titles: 1 ITF
- Highest ranking: No. 452 (6 May 2019)
- Current ranking: No. 1749 (15 June 2026)
- Last updated on: 18 June 2026.

Caroline Werner (born 8 April 1996) is a German tennis player.

Werner has a career-high WTA singles ranking of world No. 221, achieved on 25 May 2026.

== Career ==
Ranked No. 303, Werner made her WTA Tour main-draw debut at the 2025 Hamburg Open as a qualifier and recorded her first WTA Tour win over fellow qualifier and also WTA debutante, German Valentina Steiner. She lost in the second round to top seed Ekaterina Alexandrova.

== ITF Circuit finals ==
=== Singles: 8 (1 title, 7 runner-ups) ===
| Legend W75 tournaments (0–2) W25/W35 tournaments (1–1) W10/W15 tournaments (0–4) | Finals by surface Hard (0–3) Clay (1–4) |

| Result | W–L | Date | Tournament | Tier | Surface | Opponent | Score |
|---|---|---|---|---|---|---|---|
| Loss | 0–1 | Nov 2015 | ITF Helsinki, Finland | W10 | Hard (i) | (Russia) Alena Tarasova | 3–6, 3–6 |
| Loss | 0–2 | Mar 2018 | ITF Tel Aviv, Israel | W15 | Hard | (Belgium) Hélène Scholsen | 5–7, 4–6 |
| Loss | 0–3 | May 2018 | ITF Akko, Israel | W15 | Hard | (Israel) Lina Glushko | 3–6, 3–6 |
| Win | 1–3 | Sep 2018 | ITF Dobrich, Bulgaria | W25 | Clay | (Italy) Giulia Gatto-Monticone | 6–4, 3–6, 7–5 |
| Loss | 1–4 | Apr 2024 | ITF Telde, Spain | W15 | Clay | (Spain) Ariana Geerlings | 6–2, 5–7, 5–7 |
| Loss | 1–5 | May 2024 | ITF Platja d'Aro, Spain | W35 | Clay | (France) Audrey Albié | 6–2, 4–6, 5–7 |
| Loss | 1–6 | Sep 2024 | Pazardzhik Cup, Bulgaria | W75 | Clay | (Germany) Ella Seidel | 1–6, 4–6 |
| Loss | 1–7 | May 2026 | Slovak Open, Slovakia | W75 | Clay | (Italy) Tyra Caterina Grant | 3–6, 3–6 |

=== Doubles: 10 (1 title, 9 runner-ups) ===
| Legend W100 tournaments (0–1) W25/W35 tournaments (1–2) W10/W15 tournaments (0–6) | Finals by surface Hard (0–3) Clay (1–3) Carpet (0–3) |

| Result | W–L | Date | Tournament | Tier | Surface | Partner | Opponents | Score |
|---|---|---|---|---|---|---|---|---|
| Loss | 0–1 | Nov 2014 | ITF Stockholm, Sweden | W10 | Hard (i) | (Germany) Nora Niedmers | (Serbia) Elena Pridankina (Russia) Margarita Lazareva | 3–6, 6–7^{(3–7)} |
| Loss | 0–2 | Jun 2016 | ITF Alkmaar, Netherlands | W10 | Clay | (Ecuador) Charlotte Römer | (Germany) Luisa Marie Huber (Belgium) Hélène Scholsen | walkover |
| Loss | 0–3 | Oct 2016 | ITF Ismaning, Germany | W10 | Carpet (i) | (Turkey) Tamara Arnold | (Germany) Julia Kimmelmann (Germany) Franziska Kommer | 6–3, 3–6, [8–10] |
| Loss | 0–4 | Dec 2016 | ITF Cordenons, Italy | W10 | Carpet (i) | (Switzerland) Nina Stadler | (Romania) Laura Ioana Paar (Ukraine) Anastasia Zarycká | 0–6, 6–7^{(3–7)} |
| Loss | 0–5 | Mar 2018 | ITF Ramat HaSharon, Israel | W15 | Hard | (Ecuador) Charlotte Römer | (United Kingdom) Alicia Barnett (United Kingdom) Olivia Nicholls | 4–6, 6–7^{(4–7)} |
| Loss | 0–6 | Jun 2018 | ITF Óbidos, Portugal | W25 | Carpet | (Spain) Nuria Párrizas Díaz | (Italy) Giulia Gatto-Monticone (Italy) Giorgia Marchetti | 1–6, 1–6 |
| Loss | 0–7 | Apr 2024 | ITF Telde, Spain | W15 | Clay | (Poland) Marcelina Podlińska | (Sweden) Ida Johansson (Sweden) Jacquline Nylander Altelius | 3–6, 2–6 |
| Loss | 0–8 | Sep 2024 | ITF Reus, Spain | W35 | Clay | (Austria) Julia Grabher | (Switzerland) Ylena In-Albon (Mexico) María Portillo Ramírez | 4–6, 3–6 |
| Loss | 0–9 | Oct 2024 | Torneig Els Gorchs, Spain | W100 | Hard | (Germany) Mina Hodzic | Alina Charaeva; Ekaterina Reyngold | 2–6, 6–7^{(2–7)} |
| Win | 1–9 | Mar 2025 | ITF Terrassa, Spain | W35 | Clay | (Czech Republic) Aneta Kučmová | Alina Charaeva (France) Yasmine Mansouri | 3–6, 6–1, [10–6] |
