= Ella Seidel =

German tennis player (born 2005)

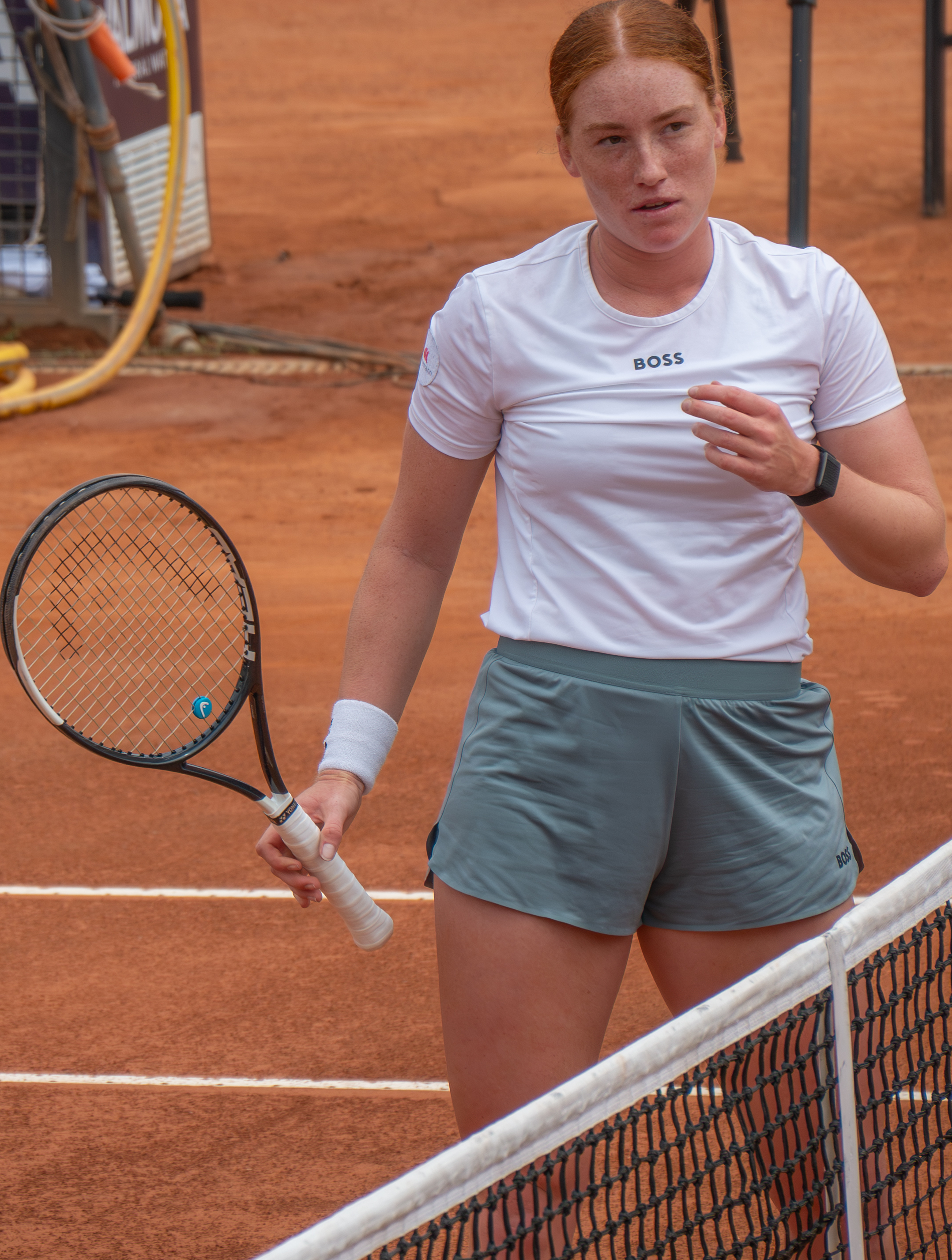
- Seidel at the 2026 Italian Open
- Full name: Ella Luise Seidel
- Country (sports): Germany
- Born: 14 February 2005 (age 21) Hamburg, Germany
- Height: 1.76 m (5 ft 9 in)
- Plays: Right-handed
- Prize money: $1,124,577

Singles
- Career record: 166–126
- Career titles: 5 ITF
- Highest ranking: No. 78 (12 January 2026)
- Current ranking: No. 124 (24 August 2026)

Grand Slam singles results
- Australian Open: 1R (2024, 2026)
- French Open: 1R (2026)
- Wimbledon: 1R (2025, 2026)
- US Open: 1R (2026)

Doubles
- Career record: 35–34
- Career titles: 1 ITF
- Highest ranking: No. 190 (23 September 2024)
- Current ranking: No. 1808 (24 August 2026)
- Last updated on: 28 August 2026.

Ella Luise Seidel (born 14 February 2005) is a German professional tennis player. She has a career-high singles ranking by the WTA of No. 78, achieved on 12 January 2026, and a best doubles ranking of No. 190, attained on 23 September 2024.

== Juniors ==
Seidel was born in Hamburg, Germany and attended the Sportgymnasium Alter Teichweg school there, where she was able to graduate high school two years early at the age of 17, allowing her to focus on her tennis career. She also spent time training in Kühlungsborn, a Baltic Sea resort town where her parents owned a holiday home.

== Professional ==
=== 2022–23: WTA Tour debut ===
Seidel made her WTA main-draw debut at the WTA 250 2022 Hamburg European Open in the doubles draw partnering with Nastasja Schunk, winning her first round match against Elixane Lechemia and Sabrina Santamaria. She made her singles main-draw debut as a wildcard at the 2023 edition of the tournament, losing to fellow German Jule Niemeier in the first round.

=== 2024: Major debut, WTA Tour quarterfinal ===
Ranked No. 172, Seidel qualified to make her major debut at the Australian Open on her first attempt of qualifying at any major, where she lost to world No. 2 and eventual champion Aryna Sabalenka in the first round.

After gaining entry into the main draw as a lucky loser at the Budapest Grand Prix in July, she defeated seventh seed Moyuka Uchijima by retirement and Anna Bondár to reach her first WTA Tour quarterfinal, at which point she lost to top seed and eventual champion Diana Shnaider. The following week at the Prague Open, Seidel made it back-to-back quarterfinal appearances by overcoming seventh seed Nadia Podoroska and lucky loser Ena Shibahara, before losing in the last eight to Linda Nosková.

Ranked No. 124 at the WTA 500 Ningbo Open, she entered the main draw as lucky loser and defeated fellow lucky loser Kathinka von Deichmann, before losing to Yulia Putintseva. She also got into the main-draw of the Guangzhou Open as a lucky loser but lost for a second time to fellow qualifier Mananchaya Sawangkaew, having also previously lost to her in the last round of qualifying.

=== 2025: WTA 1000 fourth round and 500 quarterfinal, top 100 ===
Seidel reached the quarterfinals at the Transylvania Open in February with wins over eighth seed Jaqueline Cristian and Anna Blinkova, before her run was ended by top seed and eventual champion Anastasia Potapova.

She qualified for her maiden appearance in the main-draw at Wimbledon, but was forced to retire injured in her first round match against Jessica Bouzas Maneiro, after slipping into an unmarked ditch at the back of the court.

Having made it through qualifying at the Cincinnati Open in August, Seidel recorded her first win at a WTA 1000 on her debut at this level, defeating Polina Kudermetova in three sets. She then defeated eighth seed Emma Navarro, for her first win against a top-20 ranked opponent, and 29th seed McCartney Kessler to reach a WTA 1000 fourth round for the first time, at which point she lost to fellow qualifier Varvara Gracheva in three sets. As a result she reached the top 105 in the singles rankings on 18 August 2025. At the WTA 500, the 2025 Korea Open, Seidel also qualified and this time reached the quarterfinals, defeating defending champion and sixth seed Beatriz Haddad Maia in a close to three and a half hour match (third longest match of 2025), coming from 5-2 down in the third set. Seidel made her debut in the top 100 reaching a new career-high singles ranking of world No. 95 on 22 September 2025.

== Performance timelines ==
Key
W	F	SF	QF	#R	RR	Q#	P#	DNQ	A	Z#	PO	G	S	B	NMS	NTI	P	NH

(W) winner; (F) finalist; (SF) semifinalist; (QF) quarterfinalist; (#R) rounds 4, 3, 2, 1; (RR) round-robin stage; (Q#) qualification round; (P#) preliminary round; (DNQ) did not qualify; (A) absent; (Z#) Davis/Fed Cup Zonal Group (with number indication) or (PO) play-off; (G) gold, (S) silver or (B) bronze Olympic/Paralympic medal; (NMS) not a Masters tournament; (NTI) not a Tier I tournament; (P) postponed; (NH) not held; (SR) strike rate (events won / competed); (W–L) win–loss record.
To avoid confusion and double counting, these charts are updated at the conclusion of a tournament or when the player's participation has ended.

Only WTA Tour (incl. Grand Slams) main-draw and Billie Jean King Cup (play-offs or higher) results are considered in the career statistics.

=== Singles ===
Current through the 2026 WTA Tour.

Tournament	2023	2024	2025	2026	SR	W–L
Grand Slam tournaments
Australian Open	A	1R	Q2	1R	0 / 2	0–2
French Open	A	Q1	Q3	1R	0 / 1	0–1
Wimbledon	A	Q1	1R	1R	0 / 2	0–2
US Open	A	Q2	Q3	1R	0 / 1	0–1
Win–loss	0–0	0–1	0–1	0–4	0 / 6	0–6
National representation
BJK Cup	A	A	PO	Z1	0 / 0	3–3
WTA 1000 tournaments
Qatar Open	NTI	A	A	Q2	0 / 0	0–0
Dubai Open	A	A	A	2R	0 / 1	1–1
Indian Wells Open	A	A	A	1R	0 / 1	0–1
Miami Open	A	A	A	1R	0 / 1	0–1
Italian Open	A	A	Q2	Q1	0 / 0	0–0
Cincinnati Open	A	A	4R	Q1	0 / 1	3–1
China Open	A	A	2R	A	0 / 1	1–1
Win–loss	0–0	0–0	4–2	1–3	0 / 5	5–5
Career statistics
Tournaments	1	6	8	14	29	
Hard win–loss	0–1	1–4	12–7	2–9	0 / 20	15–21
Clay win–loss	0–0	4–2	1–1	0–4	0 / 7	5–7
Grass win–loss	0–0	0–0	0–1	0–1	0 / 2	0–2
Overall win–loss	0–1	5–6	13–9	2–14	0 / 29	20–30
Year-end ranking	195	138	85	237	40%	

=== Doubles ===
Current through the 2026 WTA Tour.

Tournament	2022	2023	2024	2025	2026	SR	W–L
Grand Slam tournaments
Australian Open	A	A	A	A	A	0 / 0	0–0
French Open	A	A	A	A	A	0 / 0	0–0
Wimbledon	A	A	A	A	A	0 / 0	0–0
US Open	A	A	A	A	A	0 / 0	0–0
Career statistics
Tournaments	1	1	3	2	2	9	
Overall win–loss	1–1	1–1	1–3	0–2	0–2	3–9	
Year-end ranking	382	360	228	1123	583		

== ITF Circuit finals ==
=== Singles: 8 (5 titles, 3 runner-ups) ===
Legend W60/W75 tournaments (2–3) W25/W35 tournaments (3–0)	Finals by surface Hard (1–1) Clay (4–2)

Result	W–L	Date	Tournament	Tier	Surface	Opponent	Score
Loss	0–1	May 2023	Zagreb Ladies Open, Croatia	W60	Clay	(Romania) Jaqueline Cristian	1–6, 6–3, 6–7^{(0–7)}
Win	1–1	Jul 2023	ITF Stuttgart-Vaihingen, Germany	W25	Clay	(Germany) Julia Middendorf	6–3, 6–1
Win	2–1	Aug 2023	ITF Braunschweig, Germany	W25	Clay	(Germany) Julia Middendorf	7–6^{(7–4)}, 6–3
Loss	2–2	Oct 2023	Hamburg Ladies Cup, Germany	W60	Hard (i)	Julia Avdeeva	4–6, 6–7^{(2–7)}
Win	3–2	Nov 2023	Bratislava Open, Slovakia	W60	Hard (i)	Sofya Lansere	6–4, 7–6^{(7–4)}
Win	4–2	Jul 2024	ITF Stuttgart-Vaihingen, Germany	W35	Clay	(Romania) Cristina Dinu	6–4, 6–3
Win	5–2	Sep 2024	Pazardzhik Cup, Bulgaria	W75	Clay	(Germany) Caroline Werner	6–1, 6–4
Loss	5–3	May 2026	Zagreb Ladies Open, Croatia	W75	Clay	Erika Andreeva	3–6, 6–3, 3–6

=== Doubles: 3 (2 titles, 1 runner-up) ===
Legend W75 tournaments (1–1) W25 tournaments (1–0)	Finals by surface Hard (1–0) Clay (1–1)

Result	W–L	Date	Tournament	Tier	Surface	Partner	Opponents	Score
Win	1–0	Aug 2022	ITF Leipzig, Germany	W25	Clay	(Germany) Noma Noha Akugue	(Germany) Tea Lukic (Germany) Joëlle Steur	6–0, 7–5
Loss	1–1	May 2024	ITF Prague Open, Czech Republic	W75	Clay	(Germany) Noma Noha Akugue	(Australia) Jaimee Fourlis (Czech Republic) Dominika Šalková	7–5, 5–7, [4–10]
Win	2–1	Nov 2026	Kyotec Open, Luxembourg	W75	Hard (i)	(Germany) Tessa Brockmann	(United States) Clervie Ngounoue (United States) Malkia Ngounoue	6–4, 6–3

== Junior Grand Slam tournament finals ==
=== Doubles: 1 (runner-up) ===
Result	Year	Tournament	Surface	Partner	Opponents	Score
Loss	2022	US Open	Hard	(Germany) Carolina Kuhl	(Czech Republic) Lucie Havlíčková; Diana Shnaider	3–6, 2–6
