= 2025 Montreux Nestlé Open – Singles =

Singles
- 2025 Montreux Nestlé Open

Final
- Champion: (Poland) Maja Chwalińska
- Runner-up: (Latvia) Darja Semeņistaja
- Score: 6–1, 6–2

Events
Singles	Doubles
← 2024 ·	Montreux Ladies Open	· 2026 →

Maja Chwalińska won the singles title at the 2025 Montreux Nestlé Open, defeating Darja Semeņistaja in the final, 6–1, 6–2.

Irina-Camelia Begu was the reigning champion, but withdrew before the tournament began.

== Seeds ==
1. (Switzerland) Jil Teichmann (first round)
2. (Egypt) Mayar Sherif (first round)
3. (Czech Republic) Sára Bejlek (first round)
4. (Romania) Anca Todoni (quarterfinals)
5. (Latvia) Darja Semeņistaja (final)
6. (Austria) Julia Grabher (quarterfinals)
7. (Switzerland) Simona Waltert (quarterfinals)
8. (Netherlands) Arantxa Rus (quarterfinals)

== Draw ==
=== Key ===
- Q = Qualifier
- WC = Wild card
- LL = Lucky loser
- Alt = Alternate
- ITF = ITF entry
- PR = Protected ranking
- SR = Special ranking
- SE = Special exempt
- JE = Junior exempt
- JR = Junior Accelerator Programme entrant
- CO = College Accelerator Programme entrant
- NG = Next Gen Accelerator Program entrant
- w/o = Walkover
- r = Retired
- d = Defaulted

=== Finals ===
Semifinals
(Poland) Maja Chwalińska	6	6
(Spain) Andrea Lázaro García	3	4
5	(Latvia) Darja Semeņistaja	7^{7}	6^{3}	6
(Ukraine) Oleksandra Oliynykova	6^{5}	7^{7}	4

Final
(Poland) Maja Chwalińska	6	6
5	(Latvia) Darja Semeņistaja	1	2

=== Top half ===
First round
1/WC	(Switzerland) J Teichmann	6	4	1
(Poland) M Chwalińska	0	6	6
O Selekhmeteva	4	6	6
Q	(Germany) C Werner	6	1	1
WC	(Switzerland) S Bandecchi	2	3
(Germany) T Korpatsch	6	6
LL	(Italy) D Spiteri	3	2
8	(Netherlands) A Rus	6	6
3	(Czech Republic) S Bejlek	3	7^{7}	6^{4}
(Czech Republic) D Šalková	6	6^{5}	7^{7}
(Spain) A Lázaro García	6	6
Q	(Spain) A Bolsova	3	3
(Serbia) L Radivojević	6^{2}	4
(Croatia) T Würth	7^{7}	6
(Belgium) H Vandewinkel	2	5
6	(Austria) J Grabher	6	7

Second round
(Poland) M Chwalińska	6	6
O Selekhmeteva	2	0
(Germany) T Korpatsch	2	5
8	(Netherlands) A Rus	6	7
(Czech Republic) D Šalková	2	6^{6}
(Spain) A Lázaro García	6	7^{8}
(Croatia) T Würth	5	6	1
6	(Austria) J Grabher	7	1	6

Quarterfinals
(Poland) M Chwalińska	6	6
8	(Netherlands) A Rus	4	0
(Spain) A Lázaro García	7	6
6	(Austria) J Grabher	5	3

Semifinals
(Poland) M Chwalińska	6	6
(Spain) A Lázaro García	3	4

=== Bottom half ===
First round
5	(Latvia) D Semeņistaja	3	6	7
(Germany) M Barthel	6	3	5
(Slovenia) K Juvan	6	6
(Liechtenstein) K von Deichmann	2	3
(Italy) N Brancaccio	2	6	5
WC	D Astakhova	6	3	7
Q	(Burundi) S Nahimana	0	3
4	(Romania) A Todoni	6	6
7	(Switzerland) S Waltert	5	6	6
WC	(Switzerland) V Ryser	7	0	4
(Netherlands) A Koevermans	2	5
(Canada) C Branstine	6	7
(Spain) G Maristany	6^{1}	3
Q	(Serbia) T Kostović	7^{7}	6
(Ukraine) O Oliynykova	6	6
2	(Egypt) M Sherif	3	4

Second round
5	(Latvia) D Semeņistaja	7	6
(Slovenia) K Juvan	5	2
WC	D Astakhova	6	1	5
4	(Romania) A Todoni	3	6	7
7	(Switzerland) S Waltert	6	6
(Canada) C Branstine	4	2
Q	(Serbia) T Kostović	2	3
(Ukraine) O Oliynykova	6	6

Quarterfinals
5	(Latvia) D Semeņistaja	6	2	6
4	(Romania) A Todoni	4	6	0
7	(Switzerland) S Waltert	2	6	3
(Ukraine) O Oliynykova	6	3	6

Semifinals
5	(Latvia) D Semeņistaja	7^{7}	6^{3}	6
(Ukraine) O Oliynykova	6^{5}	7^{7}	4

== Qualifying ==
=== Seeds ===
The top five seeds received a bye into the qualifying competition.

1. (Burundi) Sada Nahimana (qualified)
2. (Germany) Caroline Werner (qualified)
3. (Spain) Aliona Bolsova (qualified)
4. (Serbia) Teodora Kostović (qualified)
5. (Slovakia) Renáta Jamrichová (qualifying competition)
6. (Italy) Dalila Spiteri (qualifying competition, lucky loser)
7. (Netherlands) Anouck Vrancken Peeters (qualifying competition)
8. (Estonia) Elena Malõgina (first round)

=== Qualifiers ===
1. (Burundi) Sada Nahimana
2. (Germany) Caroline Werner
3. (Spain) Aliona Bolsova
4. (Serbia) Teodora Kostović

=== Lucky loser ===
1. (Italy) Dalila Spiteri

=== Qualifying draw ===
==== First qualifier ====
First round				Qualifying competition
				1	(Burundi) Sada Nahimana	6	7^{7}
				7	(Netherlands) Anouck Vrancken Peeters	3	6^{3}
WC	(Switzerland) Marie Mettraux	1	2	7	(Netherlands) Anouck Vrancken Peeters	3	6^{3}
7	(Netherlands) Anouck Vrancken Peeters	6	6

==== Second qualifier ====
Qualifying competition
2	(Germany) Caroline Werner	7	4	7^{7}
5	(Slovakia) Renáta Jamrichová	5	6	6^{2}

==== Third qualifier ====
First round				Qualifying competition
				3	(Spain) Aliona Bolsova	6	7^{7}
				6	(Italy) Dalila Spiteri	2	6^{1}
	(Italy) Jessica Bertoldo	4	4	6	(Italy) Dalila Spiteri	2	6^{1}
6	(Italy) Dalila Spiteri	6	6

==== Fourth qualifier ====
First round					Qualifying competition
					4	(Serbia) Teodora Kostović	7^{9}	6
					WC	(Switzerland) Alina Granwehr	6^{7}	1
WC	(Switzerland) Alina Granwehr	6^{3}	6	6	WC	(Switzerland) Alina Granwehr	6^{7}	1
8	(Estonia) Elena Malõgina	7^{7}	1	2
