= 2013 Caesar & Imperial Cup =

- Date: 28 October–3 November
- Edition: 2nd
- Category: ITF Women's Circuit
- Prize money: $50,000
- Surface: Hard
- Location: Taipei, Taiwan

Champions

Singles
- (Poland) Paula Kania

Doubles
- (Netherlands) Lesley Kerkhove / (Netherlands) Arantxa Rus
← 2012 ·	Caesar & Imperial Cup	· 2014 →

The 2013 Caesar & Imperial Cup is a professional tennis tournament played on outdoor hard courts. It is the second edition of the tournament which is part of the 2013 ITF Women's Circuit, offering a total of $50,000 in prize money. It takes place in Taipei, Taiwan, on 28 October–3 November 2013.

== WTA entrants ==
=== Seeds ===
Country	Player	Rank^{1}	Seed
JPN	Kurumi Nara	71	1
GER	Dinah Pfizenmaier	99	2
THA	Luksika Kumkhum	109	3
BEL	Alison Van Uytvanck	122	4
BEL	An-Sophie Mestach	132	5
NED	Arantxa Rus	163	6
RUS	Ekaterina Bychkova	176	7
KAZ	Zarina Diyas	178	8

- ^{1} Rankings as of 21 October 2013

=== Other entrants ===
The following players received wildcards into the singles main draw:

- (Chinese Taipei) Chan Hao-ching
- (Chinese Taipei) Hsu Ching-wen
- (Chinese Taipei) Juan Ting-fei
- (Chinese Taipei) Lee Hua-chen

The following players received entry from the qualifying draw:

- (Hong Kong) Katherine Ip
- (Japan) Kotomi Takahata
- (Hong Kong) Wu Ho-ching
- (Japan) Aki Yamasoto

== Champions ==
=== Singles ===
- (Poland) Paula Kania def. (Kazakhstan) Zarina Diyas 6–1, 6–3

=== Doubles ===
- (Netherlands) Lesley Kerkhove / (Netherlands) Arantxa Rus def. (Chinese Taipei) Chen Yi / (Thailand) Luksika Kumkhum 6–4, 2–6, [14–12]
