= 2025 Montreux Nestlé Open – Doubles =

Doubles
- 2025 Montreux Nestlé Open

Final
- Champions: Oksana Selekhmeteva (Switzerland) Simona Waltert
- Runners-up: (Netherlands) Arantxa Rus (Romania) Anca Todoni
- Score: 6–4, 6–1

Events
Singles	Doubles
← 2024 ·	Montreux Ladies Open	· 2026 →

Oksana Selekhmeteva and Simona Waltert won the title, defeating Arantxa Rus and Anca Todoni 6–4, 6–1 in the final.

Quinn Gleason and Ingrid Martins were the reigning champions, but they did not participate this year.

== Seeds ==
1. (United Kingdom) Emily Appleton / (Netherlands) Isabelle Haverlag (quarterfinals)
2. (Spain) Aliona Bolsova / (Latvia) Darja Semeņistaja (semifinals)

== Draw ==
=== Key ===
- Q = Qualifier
- WC = Wild card
- LL = Lucky loser
- Alt = Alternate
- ITF = ITF entry
- PR = Protected ranking
- SR = Special ranking
- SE = Special exempt
- JE = Junior exempt
- JR = Junior Accelerator Programme entrant
- CO = College Accelerator Programme entrant
- NG = Next Gen Accelerator Program entrant
- w/o = Walkover
- r = Retired
- d = Defaulted

=== Draw ===
Quarterfinals
1	(United Kingdom) E Appleton (Netherlands) I Haverlag	2	6	[11]
WC	(Netherlands) A Koevermans (Switzerland) V Ryser	6	3	[13]
(Czech Republic) D Šalková (Liechtenstein) K von Deichmann	6	1	[11]
(Netherlands) A Rus (Romania) A Todoni	4	6	[13]
(Germany) T Korpatsch (Italy) A Moratelli	2	1
O Selekhmeteva (Switzerland) S Waltert	6	6
(United Kingdom) A Barnett (France) E Lechemia	4	2
2	(Spain) A Bolsova (Latvia) D Semeņistaja	6	6

Semifinals
WC	(Netherlands) A Koevermans (Switzerland) V Ryser	3	4
(Netherlands) A Rus (Romania) A Todoni	6	6
O Selekhmeteva (Switzerland) S Waltert	7^{7}	6
2	(Spain) A Bolsova (Latvia) D Semeņistaja	6^{3}	2

Final
(Netherlands) A Rus (Romania) A Todoni	4	1
O Selekhmeteva (Switzerland) S Waltert	6	6
