= 2013 Caesar & Imperial Cup – Doubles =

Doubles
- 2013 Caesar & Imperial Cup

Final
- Champions: (Netherlands) Lesley Kerkhove (Netherlands) Arantxa Rus
- Runners-up: (Chinese Taipei) Chen Yi (Thailand) Luksika Kumkhum
- Score: 6–4, 2–6, [14–12]

Events
Singles	Doubles
← 2012 ·	Caesar & Imperial Cup	· 2014 →

Chan Chin-wei and Caroline Garcia were the defending champions, having won the event in 2012, but Garcia decided not to participate. Chan partnered up with Hsu Wen-hsin but lost in the semifinals.

Lesley Kerkhove and Arantxa Rus won the title, defeating Chen Yi and Luksika Kumkhum in the final, 6–4, 2–6, [14–12].

== Seeds ==
1. (Poland) Paula Kania / (Russia) Valeria Solovyeva (semifinals)
2. (Chinese Taipei) Chan Chin-wei / (Chinese Taipei) Hsu Wen-hsin (semifinals)
3. (Japan) Misa Eguchi / (Japan) Mari Tanaka (quarterfinals)
4. (Netherlands) Lesley Kerkhove / (Netherlands) Arantxa Rus (champions)

== Draw ==
=== Key ===
- Q = Qualifier
- WC = Wild card
- LL = Lucky loser
- Alt = Alternate
- SE = Special exempt
- PR = Protected ranking
- ITF = ITF entry
- JE = Junior exempt
- w/o = Walkover
- r = Retired
- d = Defaulted
- SR = Special ranking

First round
1	(Poland) P Kania (Russia) V Solovyeva	6	6
(Russia) E Bychkova (Kazakhstan) Z Diyas	3	2
WC	(Chinese Taipei) Y-l Chen (Chinese Taipei) P-y Sieh	1	6	[10]
WC	(Chinese Taipei) C-h Chu (Chinese Taipei) C-h Yang	6	3	[7]
3	(Japan) M Eguchi (Japan) M Tanaka	6	6
WC	(Chinese Taipei) H-z Ruan (Chinese Taipei) H-l Sun	2	0
(Chinese Taipei) Y Chen (Thailand) L Kumkhum	6	7
(Chinese Taipei) P-c Lee (China) Y Zhao	4	5
(Chinese Taipei) C-w Hsu (Chinese Taipei) Y-h Lee	6	3	[11]
(Chinese Taipei) S-y Hsieh (Japan) E Takao	4	6	[9]
(Japan) S Ohta (Hong Kong) H-c Wu	2	1
4	(Netherlands) L Kerkhove (Netherlands) A Rus	6	6
(Italy) G Barbieri (India) A Raina	6^{3}	2
(Chinese Taipei) S-y Kao (Chinese Taipei) H-c Lee	7^{7}	6
(China) Z Yang (Hong Kong) L Zhang	4	4
2	(Chinese Taipei) C-w Chan (Chinese Taipei) W-h Hsu	6	6

Quarterfinals
1	(Poland) P Kania (Russia) V Solovyeva	6	6
WC	(Chinese Taipei) Y-l Chen (Chinese Taipei) P-y Sieh	2	2
3	(Japan) M Eguchi (Japan) M Tanaka	6	1	[6]
(Chinese Taipei) Y Chen (Thailand) L Kumkhum	2	6	[10]
(Chinese Taipei) C-w Hsu (Chinese Taipei) Y-h Lee	2	2
4	(Netherlands) L Kerkhove (Netherlands) A Rus	6	6
(Chinese Taipei) S-y Kao (Chinese Taipei) H-c Lee	4	4
2	(Chinese Taipei) C-w Chan (Chinese Taipei) W-h Hsu	6	6

Semifinals
1	(Poland) P Kania (Russia) V Solovyeva	3	6	[7]
(Chinese Taipei) Y Chen (Thailand) L Kumkhum	6	4	[10]
4	(Netherlands) L Kerkhove (Netherlands) A Rus	7^{9}	6
2	(Chinese Taipei) C-w Chan (Chinese Taipei) W-h Hsu	6^{7}	3

Final
(Chinese Taipei) Y Chen (Thailand) L Kumkhum	4	6	[12]
4	(Netherlands) L Kerkhove (Netherlands) A Rus	6	2	[14]
