= 2024 Montreux Nestlé Open =

Tennis tournament

- Date: 2–8 September 2024
- Edition: 7th
- Category: WTA 125 tournaments
- Surface: Clay / Outdoor
- Location: Montreux, Switzerland
- Venue: Montreux Tennis Club

Champions

Singles
- (Romania) Irina-Camelia Begu

Doubles
- (United States) Quinn Gleason / (Brazil) Ingrid Martins
| ← 2023 · | Montreux Ladies Open | · 2025 → |

The 2024 Montreux Nestlé Open was a professional tennis tournament played on outdoor clay courts. It was the seventh edition of the tournament and part of the 2024 WTA 125 tournaments (upgraded from the ITF World Tennis Tour). It took place in Montreux, Switzerland between 2 and 8 September 2024.

== Champions ==
=== Singles ===
- (Romania) Irina-Camelia Begu def. (Croatia) Petra Marčinko, 1–6, 6–3, 6–0

=== Doubles ===
- (United States) Quinn Gleason / (Brazil) Ingrid Martins def. (Argentina) María Lourdes Carlé / (Switzerland) Simona Waltert, 6–3, 4–6, [10–7]

== Singles main draw entrants ==
=== Seeds ===
| Country | Player | Rank^{1} | Seed |
|---|---|---|---|
| ARG | María Lourdes Carlé | 83 | 1 |
| ~~FRA~~ | ~~Océane Dodin~~ | ~~86~~ | ~~2~~ |
| FRA | Chloé Paquet | 97 | 3 |
| ESP | Nuria Párrizas Díaz | 100 | 4 |
| ~~SRB~~ | ~~Olga Danilović~~ | ~~110~~ | ~~5~~ |
| GER | Tamara Korpatsch | 111 | 6 |
| ROU | Irina-Camelia Begu | 130 | 7 |
| GER | Ella Seidel | 133 | 8 |

- ^{1} Rankings are as of 26 August 2024.

=== Other entrants ===
The following players received wildcards into the singles main draw:

- Kristina Dmitruk
- (Croatia) Petra Marčinko
- (Switzerland) Valentina Ryser
- (Switzerland) Simona Waltert

The following player received entry as an alternate:

- (United States) Louisa Chirico

The following players received entry from the qualifying draw:

- Amina Anshba
- (Switzerland) Jenny Dürst
- (Netherlands) Anouk Koevermans
- (Italy) Camilla Rosatello

The following players received entry as lucky losers:

- (France) Carole Monnet
- (Liechtenstein) Kathinka von Deichmann

=== Withdrawals ===
- (Serbia) Olga Danilović → replaced by (Liechtenstein) Kathinka von Deichmann
- (France) Océane Dodin → replaced by (France) Carole Monnet
- (United States) Varvara Lepchenko → replaced by (United States) Louisa Chirico

== Doubles main draw entrants ==
=== Seeds ===
| Country | Player | Country | Player | Rank^{1} | Seed |
|---|---|---|---|---|---|
| ITA | Camilla Rosatello | BEL | Kimberley Zimmermann | 179 | 1 |
| USA | Quinn Gleason | BRA | Ingrid Martins | 188 | 2 |

¹ Rankings are as of 26 August 2024.

=== Other entrants ===
The following pair received a wildcard into the doubles main draw:

- (Switzerland) Céline Naef / (Switzerland) Jil Teichmann
