= 2013 Caesar & Imperial Cup – Singles =

Singles
- 2013 Caesar & Imperial Cup

Final
- Champion: (Poland) Paula Kania
- Runner-up: (Kazakhstan) Zarina Diyas
- Score: 6–1, 6–3

Events
Singles	Doubles
← 2012 ·	Caesar & Imperial Cup	· 2014 →

Zheng Saisai was the defending champion, having won the event in 2012, but decided to participate at the 2013 Nanjing Ladies Open instead.

Paula Kania won the title, defeating Zarina Diyas in the final, 6–1, 6–3.

== Seeds ==
1. (Japan) Kurumi Nara (second round; withdrew)
2. (Germany) Dinah Pfizenmaier (second round)
3. (Thailand) Luksika Kumkhum (first round)
4. (Belgium) Alison Van Uytvanck (semifinals)
5. (Belgium) An-Sophie Mestach (first round)
6. (Netherlands) Arantxa Rus (quarterfinals)
7. (Russia) Ekaterina Bychkova (quarterfinals)
8. (Kazakhstan) Zarina Diyas (final)

== Main draw ==
=== Key ===
- Q = Qualifier
- WC = Wild card
- LL = Lucky loser
- Alt = Alternate
- SE = Special exempt
- PR = Protected ranking
- ITF = ITF entry
- JE = Junior exempt
- w/o = Walkover
- r = Retired
- d = Defaulted
- SR = Special ranking

=== Finals ===
Semifinals
8	(Kazakhstan) Zarina Diyas	7^{7}	6
4	(Belgium) Alison Van Uytvanck	6^{5}	0
(Italy) Gioia Barbieri	4	3
(Poland) Paula Kania	6	6

Final
8	(Kazakhstan) Zarina Diyas	1	3
(Poland) Paula Kania	6	6

=== Top half ===
First round
1	(Japan) K Nara	6	6
(China) Y Zhao	4	0
(Japan) M Tanaka	5
(Russia) V Solovyeva	3^{r}
WC	(Chinese Taipei) H-c Chan	3	1
(Netherlands) L Kerkhove	6	6
Q	(Hong Kong) H-c Wu	1	1
8	(Kazakhstan) Z Diyas	6	6
4	(Belgium) A Van Uytvanck	6	6
Q	(Japan) K Takahata	2	3
(Japan) E Takao	4	2
(Hong Kong) L Zhang	6	6
(Chinese Taipei) P-c Lee	3	4
WC	(Chinese Taipei) H-c Lee	6	6
Q	(Japan) A Yamasoto	4	4
7	(Russia) E Bychkova	6	6

Second round
1	(Japan) K Nara
(Japan) M Tanaka	w/o
(Netherlands) L Kerkhove	4	1
8	(Kazakhstan) Z Diyas	6	6
4	(Belgium) A Van Uytvanck	6	6
(Hong Kong) L Zhang	3	3
WC	(Chinese Taipei) H-c Lee	2	3
7	(Russia) E Bychkova	6	6

Quarterfinals
(Japan) M Tanaka	6	0	1
8	(Kazakhstan) Z Diyas	1	6	6
4	(Belgium) A Van Uytvanck	7	6
7	(Russia) E Bychkova	5	2

Semifinals
8	(Kazakhstan) Z Diyas	7^{7}	6
4	(Belgium) A Van Uytvanck	6^{5}	0

=== Bottom half ===
First round
5	(Belgium) A-S Mestach	5	4
(Japan) M Eguchi	7	6
WC	(Chinese Taipei) C-w Hsu	2	0
(Chinese Taipei) Y-j Chan	6	6
(China) Z Yang	5	2
(Chinese Taipei) Y-h Lee	7	6
(Italy) G Barbieri	6	6
3	(Thailand) L Kumkhum	4	4
6	(Netherlands) A Rus	6	6
Q	(Hong Kong) K Ip	4	1
(India) A Raina	3	3
(Chinese Taipei) W-h Hsu	6	6
(Poland) P Kania	6	3
WC	(Chinese Taipei) T-f Juan	1	0^{r}
(Chinese Taipei) C-w Chan	5	5
2	(Germany) D Pfizenmaier	7	7

Second round
(Japan) M Eguchi	1	2
(Chinese Taipei) Y-j Chan	6	6
(Chinese Taipei) Y-h Lee	2	1
(Italy) G Barbieri	6	6
6	(Netherlands) A Rus	4	6	7^{8}
(Chinese Taipei) W-h Hsu	6	2	6^{6}
(Poland) P Kania	6	6
2	(Germany) D Pfizenmaier	3	2

Quarterfinals
(Chinese Taipei) Y-j Chan	6	4	0^{r}
(Italy) G Barbieri	3	6	4
6	(Netherlands) A Rus	5	4
(Poland) P Kania	7	6

Semifinals
(Italy) G Barbieri	4	3
(Poland) P Kania	6	6
