= 2024 Montreux Nestlé Open – Doubles =

Doubles
- 2024 Montreux Nestlé Open

Final
- Champions: (United States) Quinn Gleason (Brazil) Ingrid Martins
- Runners-up: (Argentina) María Lourdes Carlé (Switzerland) Simona Waltert
- Score: 6–3, 4–6, [10–7]

Events
Singles	Doubles
← 2023 ·	Montreux Ladies Open	· 2025 →

Quinn Gleason and Ingrid Martins won the doubles title at the 2024 Montreux Nestlé Open, defeating María Lourdes Carlé and Simona Waltert in the final, 6–3, 4–6, [10–7].

Amina Anshba and Lexie Stevens were the reigning champions, but Stevens did not participate this year. Anshba partnered Conny Perrin but lost in the quarterfinals to Carlé and Waltert.

== Seeds ==
1. (Italy) Camilla Rosatello / (Belgium) Kimberley Zimmermann (quarterfinals)
2. (United States) Quinn Gleason / (Brazil) Ingrid Martins (champions)

== Draw ==
=== Key ===
- Q = Qualifier
- WC = Wild card
- LL = Lucky loser
- Alt = Alternate
- SE = Special exempt
- PR = Protected ranking
- ITF = ITF entry
- JE = Junior exempt
- w/o = Walkover
- r = Retired
- d = Defaulted
- SR = Special ranking

=== Draw ===
Quarterfinals
1	(Italy) C Rosatello (Belgium) K Zimmermann	3	2
(France) E Lechemia (France) C Monnet	6	6
(Argentina) ML Carlé (Switzerland) S Waltert	6	6
A Anshba (Switzerland) C Perrin	3	1
WC	(Switzerland) C Naef (Switzerland) J Teichmann	3	4
(Germany) E Seidel (Croatia) T Würth	6	6
(Czech Republic) J Malečková (Czech Republic) M Škoch	6^{1}	7^{11}	[6]
2	(United States) Q Gleason (Brazil) I Martins	7^{7}	6^{9}	[10]

Semifinals
(France) E Lechemia (France) C Monnet	1	5
(Argentina) ML Carlé (Switzerland) S Waltert	6	7
(Germany) E Seidel (Croatia) T Würth	5	2
2	(United States) Q Gleason (Brazil) I Martins	7	6

Final
(Argentina) María Lourdes Carlé (Switzerland) Simona Waltert	3	6	[7]
2	(United States) Quinn Gleason (Brazil) Ingrid Martins	6	4	[10]
