= Caesar & Imperial Cup =

- 2013 Caesar & Imperial Cup

ITF Women's Tour
- Event name: Taipei
- Location: Taipei, Taiwan
- Venue: Tien-Mu Tennis Courts
- Category: ITF Women's Circuit
- Surface: Hard
- Draw: 32S/32Q/16D
- Prize money: $50,000

The Caesar & Imperial Cup was a tournament for professional female tennis players played on outdoor hardcourts. The event was classified as a $50,000 ITF Women's Circuit tournament and was held in Taipei, Taiwan, 2012 and 2013.

== Finals ==
=== Singles ===
Year	Champion	Runner-up	Score
2013	(Poland) Paula Kania	(Kazakhstan) Zarina Diyas	6–1, 6–3
2012	(China) Zheng Saisai	(Kazakhstan) Zarina Diyas	6–4, 6–1

=== Doubles ===
Year	Champions	Runners-up	Score
2013	(Netherlands) Lesley Kerkhove (Netherlands) Arantxa Rus	(Chinese Taipei) Chen Yi (Thailand) Luksika Kumkhum	6–4, 2–6, [14–12]
2012	(Chinese Taipei) Chan Chin-wei (France) Caroline Garcia	(Chinese Taipei) Kao Shao-yuan (Chinese Taipei) Lee Hua-chen	4–6, 6–4, [10–6]
