= 2024 Montreux Nestlé Open – Singles =

Singles
- 2024 Montreux Nestlé Open

Final
- Champion: (Romania) Irina-Camelia Begu
- Runner-up: (Croatia) Petra Marčinko
- Score: 1–6, 6–3, 6–0

Details
- Draw: 32
- Seeds: 8

Events
Singles	Doubles
- Montreux Ladies Open

Irina-Camelia Begu won the singles title at the 2024 Montreux Nestlé Open, defeating Petra Marčinko in the final; 1–6, 6–3, 6–0.

Anna Bondár was the defending champion, but she withdrew before the tournament began.

== Seeds ==
1. (Argentina) María Lourdes Carlé (first round)
2. (France) Océane Dodin (withdrew)
3. (France) Chloé Paquet (first round)
4. (Spain) Nuria Párrizas Díaz (semifinals)
5. (Serbia) Olga Danilović (withdrew)
6. (Germany) Tamara Korpatsch (first round)
7. (Romania) Irina-Camelia Begu (champion)
8. (Germany) Ella Seidel (first round)

== Draw ==
Key

- Q = Qualifier
- WC = Wild card
- LL = Lucky loser
- Alt = Alternate
- ITF = ITF entry
- PR = Protected ranking
- SR = Special ranking
- SE = Special exempt
- JE = Junior exempt
- JR = Junior Accelerator Programme entrant
- CO = College Accelerator Programme entrant
- NG = Next Gen Accelerator Program entrant
- w/o = Walkover
- r = Retired
- d = Defaulted

=== Finals ===
Semifinals
(Latvia) Darja Semeņistaja	1	2
7	(Romania) Irina-Camelia Begu	6	6
4	(Spain) Nuria Párrizas Díaz	2	6^{4}
WC	(Croatia) Petra Marčinko	6	7^{7}

Final
7	(Romania) Irina-Camelia Begu	1	6	6
WC	(Croatia) Petra Marčinko	6	3	0

=== Top half ===
First round
1	(Argentina) ML Carlé	4	6^{4}
(Andorra) V Jiménez Kasintseva	6	7^{7}
(Poland) M Chwalińska	2	4
(Romania) A Todoni	6	6
(Ukraine) K Zavatska	4	6	4
(Latvia) D Semeņistaja	6	2	6
(Germany) M Barthel	6	6
6	(Germany) T Korpatsch	0	2
3	(France) C Paquet	6	2	6^{4}
P Kudermetova	4	6	7^{7}
(Romania) M Bulgaru	6	6
Q	(Italy) C Rosatello	3	3
(Brazil) L Pigossi	6	7^{7}
WC	(Switzerland) S Waltert	2	6^{2}
(Switzerland) C Naef	0	3
7	(Romania) I-C Begu	6	6

Second round
(Andorra) V Jiménez Kasintseva	3	1
(Romania) A Todoni	6	6
(Latvia) D Semeņistaja	0	6	6
(Germany) M Barthel	6	3	4
P Kudermetova	3	7	6
(Romania) M Bulgaru	6	5	3
(Brazil) L Pigossi	3	0
7	(Romania) I-C Begu	6	6

Quarterfinals
(Romania) A Todoni	4	6	4
(Latvia) D Semeņistaja	6	4	6
P Kudermetova	3	3
7	(Romania) I-C Begu	6	6

Semifinals
(Latvia) D Semeņistaja	1	2
7	(Romania) I-C Begu	6	6

=== Bottom half ===
First round
LL	(Liechtenstein) K von Deichmann	2	7^{7}	6
WC	(Switzerland) V Ryser	6	6^{5}	4
(France) E Jacquemot	0	6	2
(Switzerland) J Teichmann	6	4	6
WC	K Dmitruk	6	3	3
LL	(France) C Monnet	2	6	6
(France) S Janicijevic	0	1
4	(Spain) N Párrizas Díaz	6	6
8	(Germany) E Seidel	1	3
(Slovenia) V Erjavec	6	6
Alt	(United States) L Chirico	1	4
WC	(Croatia) P Marčinko	6	6
Q	(Netherlands) A Koevermans	2	7^{10}	6
Q	A Anshba	6	6^{8}	3
(Croatia) T Würth	1	6	7
Q	(Switzerland) J Dürst	6	2	5

Second round
LL	(Liechtenstein) K von Deichmann	4	1
(Switzerland) J Teichmann	6	6
LL	(France) C Monnet	7^{7}	3	2
4	(Spain) N Párrizas Díaz	6^{4}	6	6
(Slovenia) V Erjavec	0	1
WC	(Croatia) P Marčinko	6	6
Q	(Netherlands) A Koevermans	6	4	3
(Croatia) T Würth	2	6	6

Quarterfinals
(Switzerland) J Teichmann	6	3	5
4	(Spain) N Párrizas Díaz	1	6	7
WC	(Croatia) P Marčinko	3	6	6
(Croatia) T Würth	6	4	4

Semifinals
4	(Spain) N Párrizas Díaz	2	6^{4}
WC	(Croatia) P Marčinko	6	7^{7}

== Qualifying ==
=== Seeds ===
1. (United States) Louisa Chirico (moved to main draw)
2. (Liechtenstein) Kathinka von Deichmann (qualifying competition, lucky loser)
3. (France) Carole Monnet (qualifying competition, lucky loser)
4. (Netherlands) Anouk Koevermans (qualified)
5. (Switzerland) Leonie Küng (first round)
6. (Switzerland) Susan Bandecchi (first round)
7. (Belgium) Sofia Costoulas (qualifying competition)
8. (France) Audrey Albié (first round)

=== Qualifiers ===
1. (Switzerland) Jenny Dürst
2. (Italy) Camilla Rosatello
3. Amina Anshba
4. (Netherlands) Anouk Koevermans

=== Lucky losers ===
1. (France) Carole Monnet
2. (Liechtenstein) Kathinka von Deichmann

=== Qualifying draw ===
==== First qualifier ====
First round
Alt	(Germany) Caroline Werner	4	1
(United States) Elvina Kalieva	6	6
(Switzerland) Jenny Dürst	4	6	6
6	(Switzerland) Susan Bandecchi	6	1	1

Qualifying competition
(United States) Elvina Kalieva	6	1	3
(Switzerland) Jenny Dürst	4	6	6

==== Second qualifier ====
First round
2	(Liechtenstein) Kathinka von Deichmann	6	6
(Switzerland) Ylena In-Albon	0	2
(Italy) Camilla Rosatello	3	6	6
8	(France) Audrey Albié	6	0	2

Qualifying competition
2	(Liechtenstein) Kathinka von Deichmann	7^{7}	2	2
(Italy) Camilla Rosatello	6^{4}	6	6

==== Third qualifier ====
First round
3	(France) Carole Monnet	6	6
WC	(Switzerland) Sebastianna Scilipoti	3	1
Amina Anshba	6	6
5	(Switzerland) Leonie Küng	3	4

Qualifying competition
3	(France) Carole Monnet	5	0
Amina Anshba	7	6

==== Fourth qualifier ====
First round
4	(Netherlands) Anouk Koevermans	6	6
WC	(Switzerland) Marie Mettraux	3	1
(Poland) Weronika Falkowska	3	6	1
7	(Belgium) Sofia Costoulas	6	0	6

Qualifying competition
4	(Netherlands) Anouk Koevermans	6	6
7	(Belgium) Sofia Costoulas	1	3
