= 2025 Montreux Nestlé Open =

Tennis tournament

- Date: 1–7 September 2025
- Edition: 8th
- Category: WTA 125
- Prize money: $115,000
- Surface: Clay / Outdoor
- Location: Montreux, Switzerland
- Venue: Montreux Tennis Club

Champions

Singles
- (Poland) Maja Chwalińska

Doubles
- Oksana Selekhmeteva / (Switzerland) Simona Waltert
- Montreux Ladies Open

The 2025 Montreux Nestlé Open was a professional tennis tournament played on outdoor clay courts. It was the eighth edition of the tournament and part of the 2025 WTA 125 tournaments. It took place in Montreux, Switzerland between 1 and 7 September 2025.

== Singles main draw entrants ==
=== Seeds ===
Country	Player	Rank^{1}	Seed
SUI	Jil Teichmann	87	1
EGY	Mayar Sherif	102	2
CZE	Sára Bejlek	111	3
ROU	Anca Todoni	112	4
LAT	Darja Semeņistaja	115	5
AUT	Julia Grabher	116	6
SUI	Simona Waltert	124	7
NED	Arantxa Rus	131	8

- ^{1} Rankings are as of 25 August 2025.

=== Other entrants ===
The following players received wildcards into the singles main draw:

- Darya Astakhova
- (Switzerland) Susan Bandecchi
- (Switzerland) Valentina Ryser
- (Switzerland) Jil Teichmann

The following players received entry from the qualifying draw:

- (Spain) Aliona Bolsova
- (Serbia) Teodora Kostović
- (Burundi) Sada Nahimana
- (Germany) Caroline Werner

The following player received entry as a lucky loser:

- (Italy) Dalila Spiteri

=== Withdrawals ===
- (Romania) Irina-Camelia Begu → replaced by (Canada) Carson Branstine
- (Hungary) Anna Bondár → replaced by (Spain) Guiomar Maristany
- (Croatia) Jana Fett → replaced by (Spain) Andrea Lázaro García
- (Hungary) Dalma Gálfi → replaced by (Croatia) Tara Würth
- (Slovenia) Polona Hercog → replaced by (Italy) Nuria Brancaccio
- (Switzerland) Céline Naef → replaced by (Italy) Dalila Spiteri (LL)
- (Germany) Ella Seidel → replaced by (Germany) Mona Barthel
- (Slovenia) Tamara Zidanšek → replaced by (Czech Republic) Dominika Šalková

== Doubles main draw entrants ==
=== Seeds ===
Country	Player	Country	Player	Rank^{1}	Seed
GBR	Emily Appleton	NED	Isabelle Haverlag	161	1
ESP	Aliona Bolsova	LAT	Darja Semeņistaja	244	2

¹ Rankings are as of 25 August 2025.

=== Other entrants ===
The following pair received a wildcard into the doubles main draw:

- (Netherlands) Anouk Koevermans / (Switzerland) Valentina Ryser

== Champions ==
=== Singles ===
- (Poland) Maja Chwalińska def. (Latvia) Darja Semeņistaja, 6–1, 6–2

=== Doubles ===
- Oksana Selekhmeteva / (Switzerland) Simona Waltert def. (Netherlands) Arantxa Rus / (Romania) Anca Todoni, 6–4, 6–1
