= Paula Kania-Choduń =

Polish tennis player (born 1992)

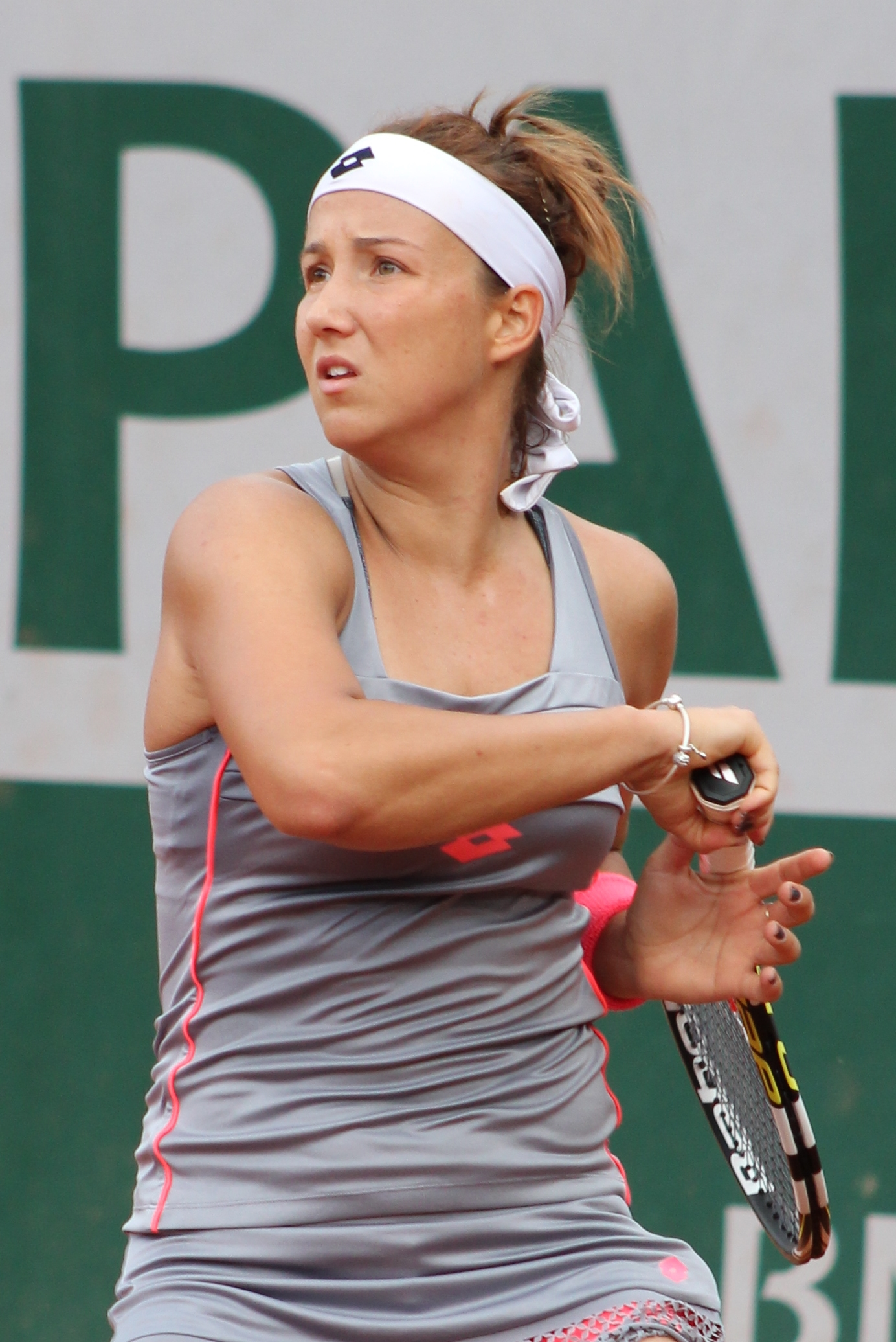
- Kania at the 2015 French Open
- Full name: Paula Maria Kania-Choduń
- Country (sports): Poland
- Residence: Sosnowiec, Poland
- Born: 6 November 1992 (age 33) Sosnowiec
- Height: 1.68 m (5 ft 6 in)
- Turned pro: 2008
- Plays: Right-handed (two-handed backhand)
- Prize money: US$ 683,546

Singles
- Career record: 243–212
- Career titles: 5 ITF
- Highest ranking: No. 128 (15 June 2015)

Grand Slam singles results
- Australian Open: Q2 (2014, 2016)
- French Open: 2R (2015)
- Wimbledon: 1R (2014, 2016)
- US Open: 1R (2014)

Doubles
- Career record: 244–187
- Career titles: 1 WTA, 14 ITF
- Highest ranking: No. 58 (2 May 2016)

Grand Slam doubles results
- Australian Open: 1R (2016)
- French Open: 3R (2015)
- Wimbledon: 1R (2015, 2016, 2017)
- US Open: 2R (2014, 2016)

Team competitions
- Fed Cup: 2–6

Paula Maria Kania-Choduń (Polish pronunciation: [ˈpau̯la ˈkaɲa]; born 6 November 1992) is a former professional Polish tennis player.

Kania-Choduń won one title in doubles on the WTA Tour, as well as five titles in singles and fourteen in doubles on the ITF Women's Circuit. On 15 June 2015, she reached a career-high singles ranking of world No. 128, and on 2 May 2016, she peaked at No. 58 in the WTA doubles rankings.

== Personal life ==
Paula was born to Paweł and Zdzisława Kania. She has one sister, Zuzanna.

In June 2020, she married Paweł Choduń and changed her name to Kania-Choduń. The ceremony took place in Krapkowice.

== Career ==
Paula Kania began playing tennis at the age of seven, her favourite surface is hardcourt. She became a professional player in 2008. She was coached by husband and physiotherapist Pawel Chodun and her tennis idol growing up were Martina Hingis and Serena Williams.

=== 2012 ===
Kania and Polina Pekhova won the Tashkent Open title defeating Anna Chakvetadze and Vesna Dolonc in the final when their opponents retired, after losing the first set 2–6. This was Kania's first WTA Tour title of any kind.

=== 2014 ===
Having qualified for her first Grand Slam main draw at Wimbledon, Kania lost in the first round to world No. 2, Li Na, in straight sets. The match was also her first singles main draw of any event, after participating in qualifying at 20 tournaments. Kania continued her momentum by qualifying for another main draw a month later, at the Stanford Classic.

== Grand Slam performance timeline ==
Key
W	F	SF	QF	#R	RR	Q#	DNQ	A	NH

(W) winner; (F) finalist; (SF) semifinalist; (QF) quarterfinalist; (#R) rounds 4, 3, 2, 1; (RR) round-robin stage; (Q#) qualification round; (DNQ) did not qualify; (A) absent; (NH) not held; (SR) strike rate (events won / competed); (W–L) win–loss record.
To avoid confusion and double counting, these charts are updated at the conclusion of a tournament or when the player's participation has ended.

=== Singles ===
Tournament	2013	2014	2015	2016	...	2022	W–L
Australian Open	A	Q2	Q1	Q2		A	0–0
French Open	Q3	Q2	2R	Q1		A	1–1
Wimbledon	Q1	1R	Q1	1R		A	0–2
US Open	Q2	1R	Q2	Q2		A	0–1
Win–loss	0–0	0–2	1–1	0–1		0–0	1–4

=== Doubles ===
Tournament	2014	2015	2016	2017	...	2022	W–L
Australian Open	A	A	1R	A		A	0–1
French Open	A	3R	2R	A		A	3–2
Wimbledon	A	1R	1R	1R		A	0–3
US Open	2R	A	2R	A		A	2–2
Win–loss	1–1	2–2	2–4	0–1		0–0	5–8

== WTA Tour finals ==
=== Doubles: 6 (1 title, 5 runner-ups) ===
Legend Premier (0–1) International (1–4)	Finals by surface Hard (1–3) Clay (0–2)

Result	W–L	Date	Tournament	Tier	Surface	Partner	Opponents	Score
Win	1–0	Sep 2012	Tashkent Open, Uzbekistan	International	Hard	(Belarus) Polina Pekhova	(Russia) Anna Chakvetadze (Serbia) Vesna Dolonc	6–2, ret.
Loss	1–1	Jul 2014	Istanbul Cup, Turkey	International	Hard	(Georgia (country)) Oksana Kalashnikova	(Japan) Misaki Doi (Ukraine) Elina Svitolina	4–6, 0–6
Loss	1–2	Aug 2014	Stanford Classic, United States	Premier	Hard	(Czech Republic) Kateřina Siniaková	(Spain) Garbiñe Muguruza (Spain) Carla Suárez Navarro	2–6, 6–4, [5–10]
Loss	1–3	Jul 2015	Brasil Tennis Cup, Florianópolis	International	Clay	(Argentina) María Irigoyen	(Germany) Annika Beck (Germany) Laura Siegemund	3–6, 6–7^{(1)}
Loss	1–4	Sep 2015	Tournoi de Québec, Canada	International	Hard (i)	(Argentina) María Irigoyen	(Czech Republic) Barbora Krejčíková (Belgium) An-Sophie Mestach	6–4, 3–6, [10–12]
Loss	1–5	Apr 2016	Prague Open, Czech Republic	International	Clay	(Argentina) María Irigoyen	(Russia) Margarita Gasparyan (Czech Republic) Andrea Hlaváčková	4–6, 2–6

== ITF Circuit finals ==
Legend
$100,000 tournaments
$80,000 tournaments
$50,000 tournaments
$25,000 tournaments
$10,000 tournaments

=== Singles: 8 (5 titles, 3 runner-ups) ===
Result	W–L	Date	Tournament	Tier	Surface	Opponent	Score
Win	1–0	Aug 2010	ITF Gliwice, Poland	10,000	Clay	(Poland) Anna Korzeniak	7–6^{(2)}, 3–6, 7–5
Loss	1–1	Mar 2011	ITF Amiens, France	10,000	Clay	(Italy) Nastassja Burnett	6–2, 1–6, 4–6
Win	2–1	Jul 2011	ITF Horb, Germany	10,000	Clay	(Germany) Carina Witthöft	4–6, 6–4, 7–5
Loss	2–2	Nov 2011	ITF Opole, Poland	25,000	Carpet (i)	(Croatia) Ana Vrljić	3–6, 6–2, 6–7^{(4)}
Loss	2–3	Jul 2012	Bella Cup, Poland	25,000	Clay	(Montenegro) Danka Kovinić	3–6, 6–4, 3–6
Win	3–3	Jul 2013	Bella Cup, Poland	25,000	Clay	(Poland) Katarzyna Piter	6–4, 6–4
Win	4–3	Nov 2013	Taipei Cup, Taiwan	50,000	Clay	(Kazakhstan) Zarina Diyas	6–1, 6–3
Win	5–3	Aug 2014	ITF Landisville, United States	25,000	Hard	(Tunisia) Ons Jabeur	5–7, 6–3, 6–4

=== Doubles: 32 (14 titles, 18 runner-ups) ===
Result	W–L	Date	Tournament	Tier	Surface	Partner	Opponents	Score
Win	1–0	Jul 2010	ITF Piešťany, Slovakia	10k	Clay	(Poland) Weronika Domagała	(Czech Republic) Gabriela Horáčková (Czech Republic) Petra Krejsová	6–1, 6–1
Loss	1–1	Sep 2010	ITF Tbilisi, Georgia	25k	Clay	(Hungary) Zsófia Susányi	(Georgia (country)) Tatia Mikadze (Georgia (country)) Sofia Shapatava	3–6, 2–6
Loss	1–2	Nov 2010	ITF Minsk, Belarus	25k	Hard	(Poland) Katarzyna Piter	(Russia) Elena Bovina (Russia) Ekaterina Bychkova	4–6, 0–6
Loss	1–3	Nov 2010	ITF Opole, Poland	25k	Carpet (i)	(Poland) Magda Linette	(Georgia (country)) Oksana Kalashnikova (Belarus) Polina Pekhova	3–6, 4–6
Loss	1–4	Jan 2011	ITF Kaarst, Germany	10k	Carpet (i)	(Russia) Marina Melnikova	(Czech Republic) Nikola Fraňková (Czech Republic) Tereza Hladíková	6–3, 6–7^{(1)}, [8–10]
Win	2–4	Mar 2011	ITF Amiens, France	10k	Clay	(Poland) Barbara Sobaszkiewicz	(Czech Republic) Iveta Gerlová (Czech Republic) Lucie Kriegsmannová	3–6, 6–4, [10–6]
Win	3–4	Jul 2011	ITF Horb, Germany	10k	Clay	(Poland) Katarzyna Kawa	(Hungary) Vaszilisza Bulgakova (Germany) Christina Shakovets	1–6, 6–3, [10–2]
Loss	3–5	Aug 2011	ITF Piešťany, Slovakia	10k	Clay	(Czech Republic) Martina Kubičíková	(Czech Republic) Simona Dobrá (Czech Republic) Lucie Kriegsmannová	4–6, 2–6
Loss	3–6	Nov 2011	ITF Opole, Poland	25k	Carpet (i)	(Poland) Magda Linette	(United Kingdom) Naomi Broady (France) Kristina Mladenovic	6–7^{(5)}, 4–6
Win	4–6	Jan 2012	ITF Stuttgart, Germany	10k	Hard	(Russia) Ksenia Lykina	(Ukraine) Lyudmyla Kichenok (Ukraine) Nadiya Kichenok	6–4, 6–3
Win	5–6	Mar 2012	ITF Fort Walton Beach, US	25k	Hard	(United States) Madison Brengle	(Russia) Elena Bovina (France) Alizé Lim	6–3, 6–4
Loss	5–7	Apr 2012	ITF Namangan, Uzbekistan	25k	Hard	(United Kingdom) Naomi Broady	(Georgia (country)) Oksana Kalashnikova (Russia) Marta Sirotkina	6–2, 7–5
Win	6–7	Apr 2012	ITF Moscow, Russia	25k	Hard	(Belarus) Polina Pekhova	(Russia) Tatiana Kotelnikova (Belarus) Lidziya Marozava	6–4, 3–6, [10–7]
Loss	6–8	Jun 2012	ITF Craiova, Romania	50k	Clay	(Russia) Irina Khromacheva	(Czech Republic) Renata Voráčová (Slovakia) Lenka Wienerová	2–6, 6–3, [10–6]
Win	7–8	Oct 2012	ITF Seville, Spain	25k	Clay	(Poland) Katarzyna Piter	(Bulgaria) Aleksandrina Naydenova (Brazil) Teliana Pereira	5–7, 6–4, [10–6]
Loss	7–9	Apr 2013	ITF Civitavecchia, Italy	25k	Clay	(Poland) Magda Linette	(Liechtenstein) Stephanie Vogt (Czech Republic) Renata Voráčová	3–6, 4–6
Win	8–9	May 2013	Maribor Open, Slovenia	25k	Clay	(Poland) Magda Linette	(Argentina) Mailen Auroux (Argentina) María Irigoyen	6–3, 6–0
Win	9–9	Jun 2013	ITF Padua, Italy	25k	Clay	(Russia) Irina Khromacheva	(Romania) Cristina Dinu (Slovenia) Maša Zec Peškirič	6–3, 6–1
Loss	9–10	Jun 2013	ITF Zlín, Czech Republic	25k	Clay	(Poland) Katarzyna Piter	(Czech Republic) Martina Borecká (Czech Republic) Tereza Smitková	1–6, 7–5, [8–10]
Win	10–10	Jul 2013	Bella Cup, Poland	25k	Clay	(Poland) Magda Linette	(Ukraine) Yuliya Beygelzimer (Romania) Elena Bogdan	6–2, 4–6, [10–5]
Win	11–10	Oct 2013	ITF Casablanca, Morocco	25k	Clay	(Russia) Valeria Solovyeva	(Chile) Cecilia Costa Melgar (Italy) Anastasia Grymalska	7–6^{(3)}, 6–4
Win	12–10	May 2015	Nana Trophy, Tunisia	50k	Clay	(Argentina) Maria Irigoyen	(France) Julie Coin (France) Stéphanie Foretz	6–1, 6–3
Loss	12–11	Dec 2015	Ankara Cup, Turkey	50k	Hard (i)	(Netherlands) Lesley Kerkhove	(Russia) Marina Melnikova (Spain) María José Martínez Sánchez	4–6, 7–5, [8–10]
Loss	12–12	Jan 2017	ITF Daytona Beach, US	25k	Clay	(Poland) Katarzyna Piter	(United States) Robin Anderson (Ukraine) Anhelina Kalinina	4–6, 1–6
Loss	12–13	Jan 2017	ITF Orlando, United States	25k	Clay	(Poland) Katarzyna Piter	(United States) Sophie Chang (United States) Madeleine Kobelt	3–6, 6–3, [6–10]
Loss	12–14	Jun 2017	Ilkley Trophy, UK	100k	Grass	(Belgium) Maryna Zanevska	(Russia) Anna Blinkova (Russia) Alla Kudryavtseva	1–6, 4–6
Loss	12–15	Feb 2020	Cairo Open, Egypt	W60	Hard	(Ukraine) Anastasiya Shoshyna	(Ukraine) Marta Kostyuk (Russia) Kamilla Rakhimova	3–6, 6–2, [6–10]
Win	13–15	Sep 2020	Open de Saint-Malo, France	W60	Clay	(Poland) Katarzyna Piter	(Poland) Magdalena Fręch (Switzerland) Viktorija Golubic	6–2, 6–4
Loss	13–16	Sep 2020	Open de Cagnes-sur-Mer, France	W80	Clay	(Poland) Katarzyna Piter	(United Kingdom) Samantha Murray Sharan (Germany) Julia Wachaczyk	5–7, 2–6
Loss	13–17	Nov 2020	Tyler Pro Classic, US	W80	Hard	(Poland) Katarzyna Piter	(United States) Allura Zamarripa (United States) Maribella Zamarripa	3–6, 7–5, [9–11]
Loss	13–18	Jan 2021	Open Andrézieux-Bouthéon, France	W60	Hard (i)	(Ukraine) Katarina Zavatska	(China) Lu Jiajing (China) You Xiaodi	3–6, 4–6
Win	14–18	Feb 2021	AK Ladies Open, Germany	W25	Carpet (i)	(Germany) Julia Wachaczyk	(Switzerland) Viktorija Golubic (Switzerland) Ylena In-Albon	7–6^{(5)}, 6–4
