= Arantxa Rus =

Dutch tennis player (born 1990)

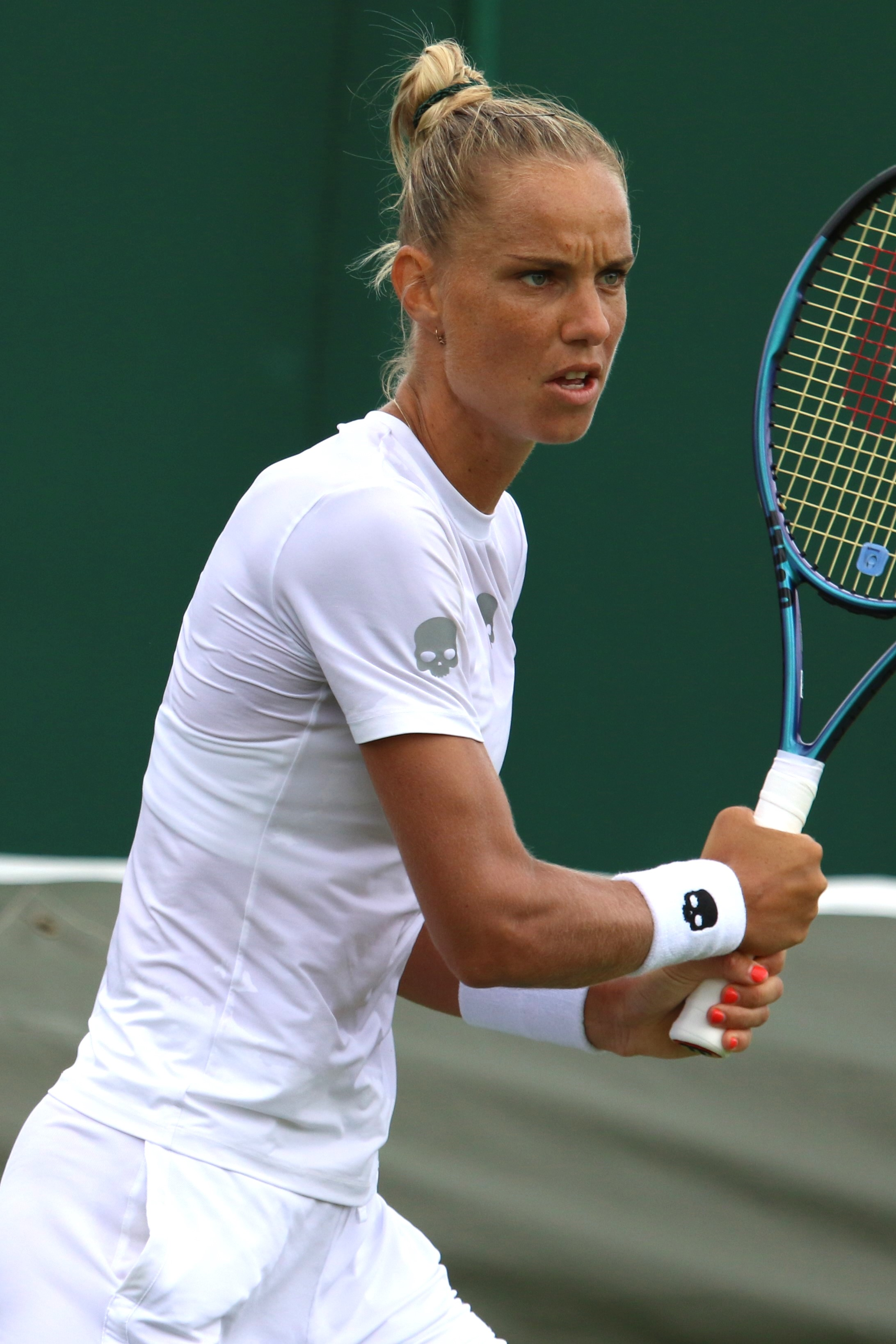
- Rus at the 2023 Wimbledon Championships
- Country (sports): Netherlands
- Residence: Barcelona, Spain; Monster, Netherlands
- Born: 13 December 1990 (age 35) Delft, Netherlands
- Height: 1.80 m (5 ft 11 in)
- Turned pro: 2008
- Plays: Left (two-handed backhand)
- Coach: Julián Alonso
- Prize money: US$ 4,853,175

Singles
- Career record: 761–493
- Career titles: 1
- Highest ranking: No. 41 (14 August 2023)
- Current ranking: No. 280 (9 November 2026)

Grand Slam singles results
- Australian Open: 2R (2011, 2020, 2024)
- French Open: 4R (2012)
- Wimbledon: 3R (2012)
- US Open: 2R (2011, 2024)

Other tournaments
- Olympic Games: 2R (2024)

Doubles
- Career record: 296–240
- Career titles: 4
- Highest ranking: No. 56 (8 November 2021)
- Current ranking: No. 354 (9 November 2026)

Grand Slam doubles results
- Australian Open: 2R (2021)
- French Open: 2R (2020, 2021, 2024)
- Wimbledon: 3R (2021)
- US Open: 3R (2023)

Other doubles tournaments
- Olympic Games: 1R (2024)

Team competitions
- Fed Cup: 19–23 (singles 18–18)
- Last updated on: 11 November 2026.

Arantxa Rus (Dutch pronunciation: [aːˈrɑɲtɕaː ˈrʏs]; born 13 December 1990) is a Dutch professional tennis player. She won one WTA Tour singles title at the 2023 Hamburg Open and four in doubles.

Her biggest singles successes to date include a second-round upset over world No. 2, Kim Clijsters, at the 2011 French Open, reaching the fourth round at the 2012 French Open, and defeating world No. 5, Samantha Stosur, in the 2012 Wimbledon Championships to reach the third round.

== Early life ==
Arantxa Rus was born on 13 December 1990 in Delft, Netherlands, and grew up in Monster. She is the daughter of Lous and Judith Rus and has an older sister, Kim, who also played tennis. Her mother, who is of German descent, practiced water skiing.

Rus began playing tennis at the age of five, after her older sister introduced her to the sport. She started at the local tennis club MLTV'90 in Monster. Despite sharing her first name with Spanish tennis player Arantxa Sánchez Vicario, Rus was not named after her.

== Career ==
=== 2005–07 ===
At age 14, Rus played her first ITF Women's Circuit tournament at Alkmaar where she lost in the second round to Julie Coin. In 2006, she played two more ITF events at Heerhugowaard and Vlaardingen, reaching the semifinals at the latter. In 2007, Rus continued playing on the ITF Circuit, winning her first title at Vlaardingen and second at Alphen aan de Rijn. In San Luis Potosí, she reached the final but lost in three sets. In 's-Hertogenbosch, she was granted a wildcard to play her first WTA Tour main draw. She lost to Alona Bondarenko, in the first round. Her end-of-season 2007 ranking was No. 465.

=== 2008: Juniors Grand Slam champion and turning pro ===
In 2008, Rus won the girls' singles title at the Australian Open, defeating Jessica Moore in the final and reached the semifinals at Roland Garros and quarterfinals at Wimbledon. Later that year, she became the world No. 1 junior player.

In April 2008, she won an ITF title in Bari beating four seeded players en route, including Lucie Hradecká and Alberta Brianti. Rus was given another wildcard to play at 's-Hertogenbosch, where she was defeated in the first round by Mariya Koryttseva.

In September, she played qualifying in Guangzhou winning both matches. In the first round of the main draw, she beat Yanina Wickmayer, in three sets. This was her first main-draw win on the WTA Tour. Rus reached the quarterfinals by beating Gisela Dulko, before losing to Camille Pin, in straight sets. She made it through the qualifying and reached the second round in Tashkent losing to top seed Peng Shuai, in two sets. In Opole, she won another ITF tournament, her second in 2008, and fourth overall.

She ended the year ranked No. 188.

=== 2009 ===
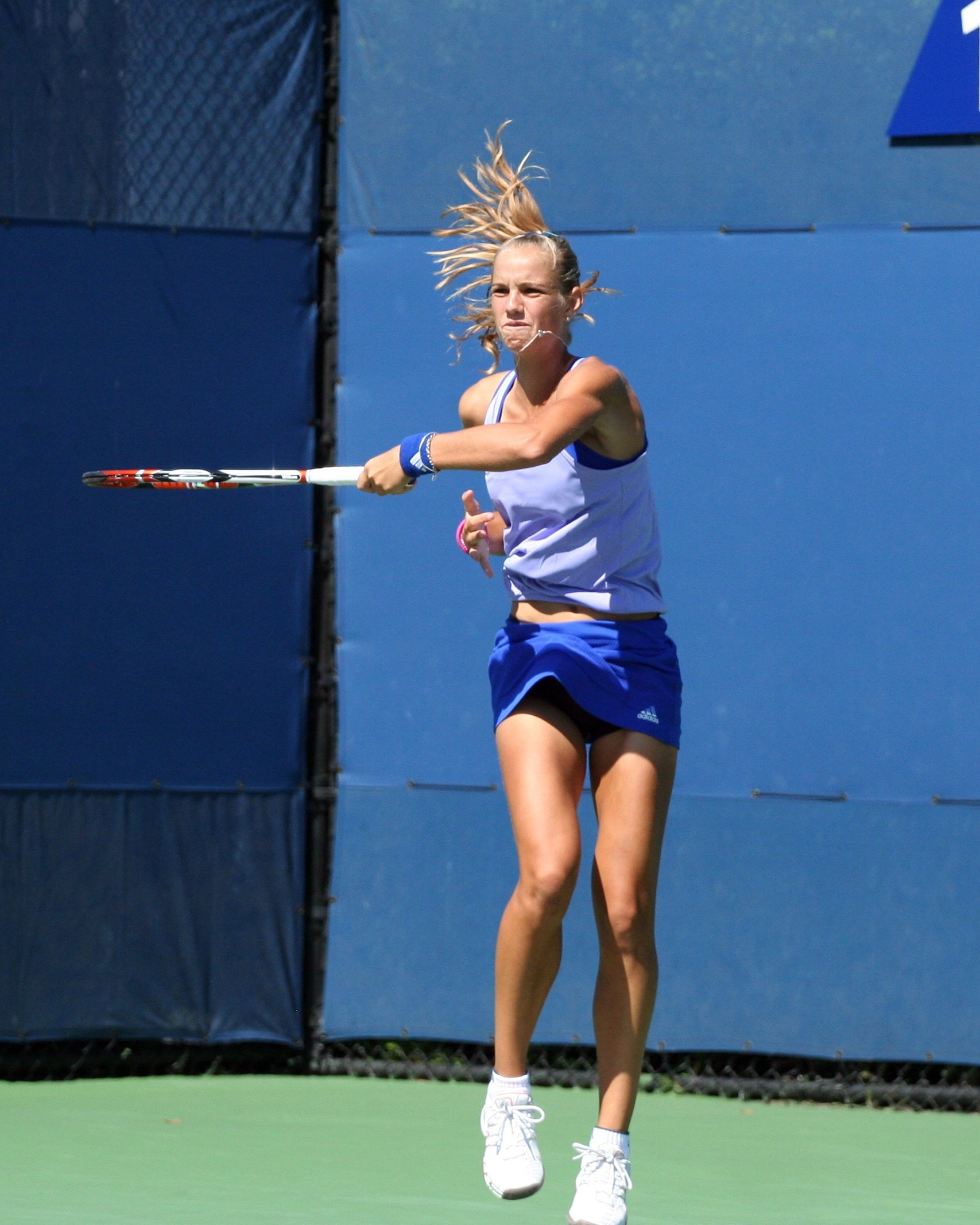
Rus playing in the 2009 US Open

Rus failed in the qualifyings at Hobart, and the Australian Open. At Roland Garros, where she started as world No. 142, she passed through the qualifying rounds, won her first-round match against Olivia Sanchez 6–1, 6–1 but then lost to Yaroslava Shvedova 0–6, 2–6.

She played a few more tournaments without much success. In the end of the season, she won ten of eleven matches. First, at the ITF Poitiers, she passed through the qualifying rounds, won matches against third seed Alexandra Dulgheru and Séverine Beltrame before losing in the quarterfinals to Pauline Parmentier. Then, she played at an ITF event in Nantes where she won the title without dropping a set through the tournament, with a two-set victory against Renata Voráčová in the final.

She ended the year with a win–loss record of 37–24.

=== 2010 ===
Rus failed at the qualifying rounds of the Hobart International and the Australian Open. In Estoril, she passed three qualifying rounds and won two matches in main draw, but lost to Sorana Cîrstea. She lost at the US Open in the second qualifying round to Wimbledon junior champion Kristýna Plíšková, in three sets. At the Koddaert Ladies Open, she overcame eighth seed Tathiana Garbin in the first round, and in the second was better than Michaëlla Krajicek, before losing in the quarterfinals to second seed Timea Bacsinszky, in straight sets. In the qualifying for the Luxembourg Open, she lost in the first round to No. 5 seed Sorana Cîrstea, in three sets. Later, she competed in the Tennis Masters Rotterdam final against Michaëlla Krajicek, but lost in straight sets. She ended the year with a win–loss record of 33–26.

=== 2011 ===
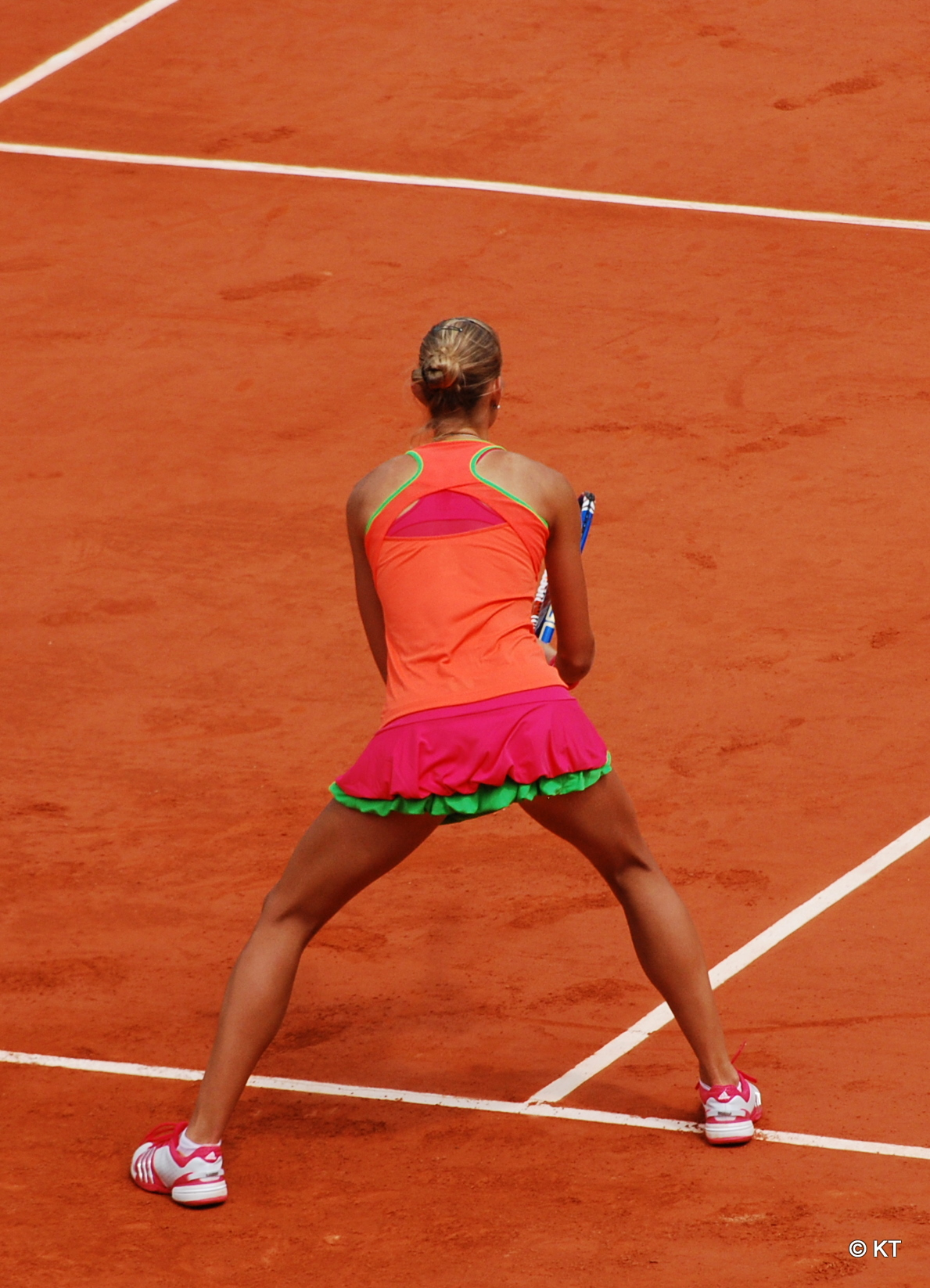
Roland Garros 2011

Her first tournament was the Brisbane International, where she played through the qualifying rounds. In the first round, she defeated Isabella Holland. In the second round, she defeated Olivia Rogowska but then lost to Anna Tatishvili in two sets. Rus next went through the qualifying rounds at the Sydney International. In the first round, she beat 1999 Wimbledon semifinalist Mirjana Lučić but in the second round, she lost against Bojana Jovanovski in a narrow three-setter.

In the first major event of the season, the Australian Open, Rus went through the qualifying rounds, as the No. 18 seed. In the first round, she defeated Julia Cohen. In the second, she again defeated Isabella Holland, and in the third qualifying round, Rus beat Kurumi Nara, also in straight sets. In her first Australian Open main-draw appearance, she defeated Bethanie Mattek-Sands, but then lost to No. 23 seed, Svetlana Kuznetsova in the second round. Then, she played for the Netherlands Fed Cup Team at Group I of the European/African Zone. She won all of her singles matches against Hungary, Romania, and Latvia, helping the Netherlands with three victories. But they lost in the Promotional Play-off against Switzerland 2–1.

She played at Stockholm, where she won the doubles title with Anastasiya Yakimova, and lost the singles final to Kristina Mladenovic. She withdrew from the WTA event in Monterrey due to illness. At Indian Wells, she played in the qualifying draw, but lost to Jamie Hampton, in three sets. At the Bahamas Open, she beat Jill Craybas and Kristina Barrois in the first two rounds. In the quarterfinals, she met her doubles partner, Anastasiya Yakimova, and lost in two sets. Then, she played qualifying matches for the Miami Open. In the first round, she defeated Misaki Doi and Michelle Larcher de Brito in the second qualifying round. In the main draw, she lost in the first round against Lourdes Domínguez Lino, in three sets. Next was the Andalucia Tennis Experience, where she faced Dinara Safina in the first round, losing in three sets. She also lost in the first round at Fes in three sets to Aravane Rezaï. Then she played qualifying matches for the Portugal Open, beating Anne Kremer in the first round, but losing against Sesil Karatancheva in three sets. At the Madrid Open, she lost her first-round match against Maria Sharapova.

She continued on the ITF Circuit, first at Saint-Gaudens. In the first round, Rus beat Claire de Gubernatis, and then Séverine Beltrame in the second round. In the quarterfinal, she beat former junior No. 1, Elina Svitolina, in three sets, and in the semifinal defeated Valeria Savinykh in straight sets. She lost to Anastasia Pivovarova in the final in three sets. Then, she went on to the French Open and defeated Marina Erakovic in the first round. In the second round, she defeated the No. 2 seed Kim Clijsters in three sets, after saving two match points. She then lost to Maria Kirilenko in the next round. Than she played at UNICEF Open where she defeated Indy de Vroome and CoCo Vandeweghe before she lost again to Svetlana Kuznetsova.

In Wimbledon qualifying first round, she was better than Olivia Sanchez before she lost to Lindsay Lee-Waters, in the second. Then, she played at the ITF Cuneo where she defeated Camilla Rosatello, Laura Pous Tió, Petra Martić, and Mirjana Lučić but lost to Anna Tatishvili in the final. She was playing at the Contrexéville Open where, as the top seed, she defeated Anna-Lena Grönefeld in the first round, Roxane Vaisemberg in the second, both in straight sets, but lost to Iryna Brémond in the quarterfinals. Then, she played ITF Astana where she defeated Zarina Diyas in the first round; but in the second round against Ekaterina Bychkova, she retired in the third set with Bychkova leading 2–0. Later in the year at the US Open, she defeated Elena Vesnina but lost to Caroline Wozniacki in the second round. After that, she played at the ITF event in Nigbo and lost to Xu Yifan in the second round, followed by three first-round losses at Seoul (lost to Dulgheru), Pan Pacific open (to Pavlyuchenkova) and at the qualifying first round in Linz (lost to Broady). Her next tournament was in Dubai where she won matches against Erika Sema, Conny Perrin, and Akgul Amanmuradova, before losing to Kristina Mladenovic in the semifinals.

=== 2012: Best season, French Open 4th round, career-high ranking ===
At the Brisbane, she lost her qualifying first-round match to Arantxa Parra Santonja and then lost to Vania King in the same round at Sydney. In her second Australian Open main-draw appearance, she lost to Lesia Tsurenko, in two sets.

She missed Fed Cup matches due to a tooth infection, and then lost in the Qatar Ladies Open qualifying first round against Caroline Garcia. She went on in Dubai and defeated Barbora Záhlavová-Strýcová in the qualifying first round, and Ons Jabeur in the second before she lost to Simona Halep in final qualifying round. She went over to the Indian Wells Open but lost to Elena Baltacha in the first round. After that, she played an ITF tournament in Clearwater. She defeated Tetiana Luzhanska and Sachia Vickery before losing to Garbiñe Muguruza. She then headed over to the Miami Open, where she beat Caroline Garcia before she lost to Misaki Doi.

Then, in her first clay tournament of the year, The Oaks Club Challenger, she won the first title since Nantes in 2009. She defeated Misaki Doi, Irina Falconi, Florencia Molinero, Edina Gallovits-Hall, and in the final, Sesil Karatantcheva. She played in Charleston and lost in the first round against Anna Tatishvili in three sets. In Brussels, she reached the second round by beating Zheng Jie, but had to retire because of a lower back injury in her second-round match against Sofia Arvidsson.

Rus entered Roland Garros main draw based on her ranking and reached the second round, after Jamie Hampton retired with Rus leading. She then beat Virginie Razzano, who had a shock win over Serena Williams in the first round, in two sets. Subsequently, for the first time in her career, she reached the last 16 of a major tournament with a victory in three sets over 25th seed Julia Görges. She lost in the fourth round to 23rd seed Kaia Kanepi in three sets. Rus was the first Dutchwoman in 19 years to reach the fourth round in Paris (the last being Brenda Schultz-McCarthy in 1993).

She entered Wimbledon Championships and beat Misaki Doi in the first round. She then shocked fifth seeded Samantha Stosur in three sets in the second round. Rus lost in the third round to Peng Shuai in straight sets. It was the best Wimbledon result in her career. Afterwards, she reached semifinals at the 100k Biarritz tournament played on clay. Her last win at WTA Tour-level was in Dallas, as she went on to lose in the first round at the US Open, Seoul, Linz and Luxembourg tournaments.

Rus finished the year ranked No. 68 in the world, her best year-end ranking.

=== 2013 ===
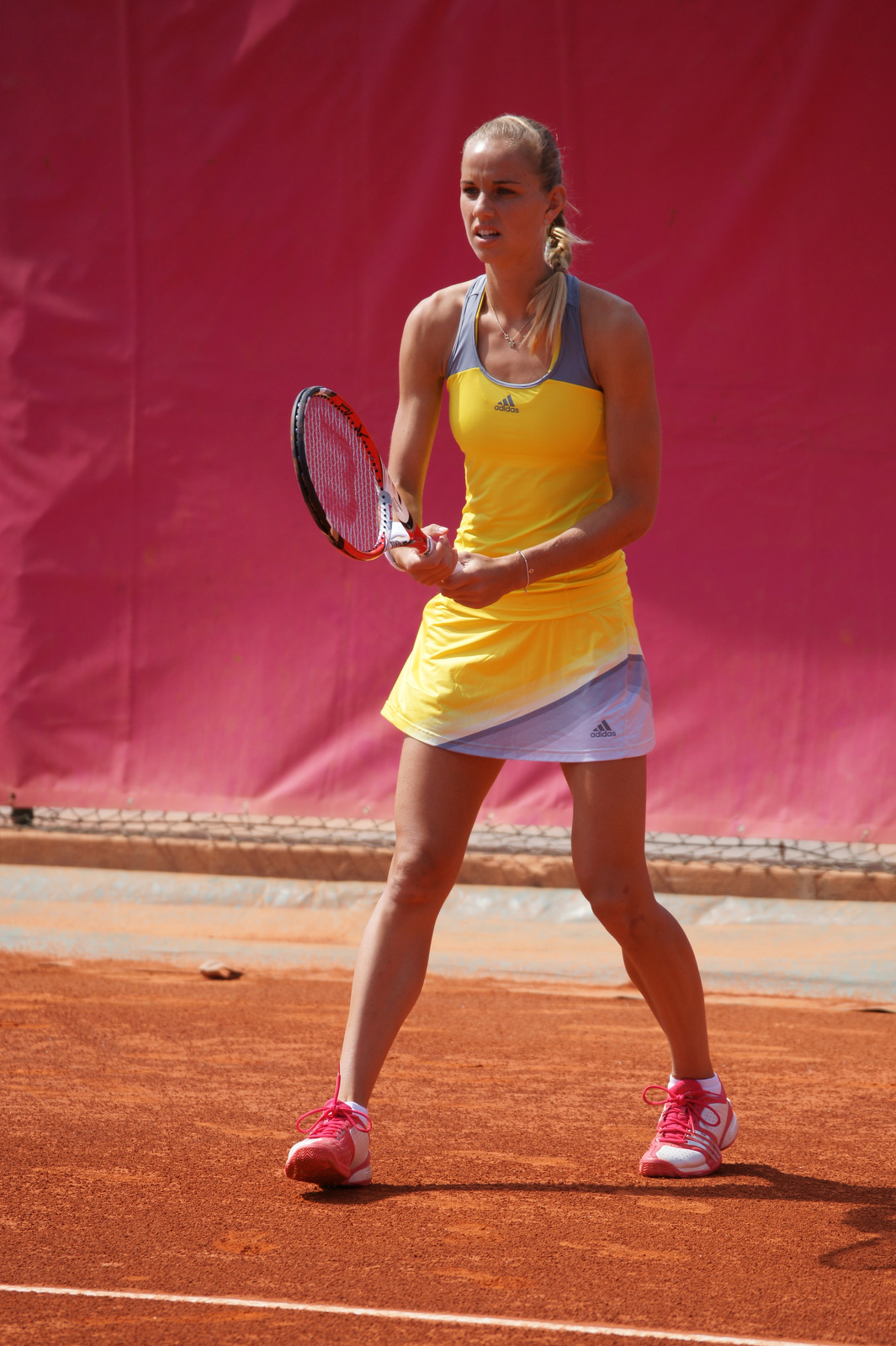
Arantxa Rus at the 2013 Open de Cagnes-sur-Mer

Losing to Olga Puchkova in the first round of Wimbledon was her 17th loss at the WTA Tour-level in a row, tying the longest losing streak in Tour history. She ended this streak in Bad Gastein, where she defeated María Teresa Torró Flor and Estrella Cabeza Candela in the first two rounds. In the quarterfinals, she lost to Yvonne Meusburger who then went on to win the tournament in her homeland.

Rus proceeded to have success on the ITF Circuit, winning four $25k singles titles on clay: at Fleurus, Alphen a/d Rijn, Vallduxo and Sant Cugat. She also won two doubles titles at Cagnes-sur-Mer and Taipei.

Her singles main-draw win/loss ratio was 2–13 for WTA Tour and major-level and 30–9 for ITF Circuit level. Her end of the season ranking was No. 160.

=== 2014 ===
Her success in the previous year allowed her to play the qualifying rounds of the major tournaments, failing to win a match at the Australian Open, Wimbledon Championships and US Open. At the French Open, Rus beat Lyudmyla Kichenok in the first qualifying round, but lost to Timea Bacsinszky in the second round. She failed to qualify for several WTA tournaments, including Brisbane, Florianópolis, Katowice Open, Ricoh Open and Båstad.

At the Fed Cup World Group II playoffs, Rus played two singles matches for the Netherlands, beating world No. 100, Kurumi Nara, and losing to Misaki Doi, in three sets, ultimately the Netherlands beat Japan with a score of 3–2.

Rus didn't reach a singles final at the ITF Circuit level that year, but she had success on clay again, reaching the semifinals of four 25k tournaments played in Chiasso, Wiesbaden, Brescia and Dobrich. She won a doubles title alongside Demi Schuurs, at Fleurus.

With an overall 21–16 win/loss ratio at ITF Circuit level, Rus finished the year ranked No. 230 in singles.

=== 2015 ===
In February, playing on indoor clay, the Netherlands faced Slovakia at the Fed Cup World Group II tie. There, Rus scored wins against two top-100 players Magdaléna Rybáriková and Anna Karolína Schmiedlová. The Netherlands went on to win the tie 4-1 and moved on to the World Group playoffs. Playing the World Group playoffs against Australia and on indoor clay again, Rus, ranked 217th in the world, lost her first match against Casey Dellacqua, but beat 48th-ranked Jarmila Gajdošová in a three-set match, ultimately helping the Netherlands get the win and a pass to the Fed Cup World Group for the first time since 1998. As a result of her performance, she was nominated for a Heart Award by the Fed Cup, ultimately losing to Romania's Irina-Camelia Begu.

Rus had little success on the Circuit. In January, she reached the semifinals of a $25k tournament in Daytona Beach losing to Elise Mertens In June, she reached a $15k final in Zeeland, Netherlands, losing to Quirine Lemoine. In August, she lost to Kiki Bertens in the semifinals of a $25k tournament in Koksijde, Belgium. Rus reached three doubles finals, two alongside Lesley Kerkhove and one with Elise Mertens. She had a 23-24 singles win/loss ratio this year at the ITF Circuit, not counting qualifying matches. She finished season as No. 289 in singles, her lowest year-end ranking since 2007.

=== 2016 ===
Rus's low ranking meant she had to qualify for several ITF tournaments, successfully doing so seven times. In February, she played on indoor carpet at Altenkirchen, Germany, winning two qualifying rounds to enter the main draw, and winning another four matches to reach the final where she lost to Ysaline Bonaventure. In July, she reached the semifinals of a 50k clay-court tournament in Rome where she lost to Laura Pous Tió. Rus reached the semifinals of another two 25k tournaments, both played on outdoor clay, in Aschaffenburg (where she had to win three qualifying rounds) and Leipzig, losing both times at that stage. In October, she won back to back 25k titles in Thailand and France. Rus reached the singles quarterfinals or better at eleven ITF tournaments this year. She also won three doubles titles.

Rus won 39 singles matches on the ITF Circuit, and with a 39–21 win/loss ratio she finished the year in the top 200 for the first time since 2013, as the 174th singles player in the rankings, moving 115 spots up from the previous year.

=== 2017: First WTA 250 doubles title and WTA 125 singles final ===
For the first time since 2014, Rus played the qualifying rounds of a major, at the Australian Open, losing in the first round to Romanian Ana Bogdan in three sets. In March, she reached the quarterfinals of the $60k hardcourt event in Zhuhai, China.

She started for the Netherlands in Fed Cup, pairing with Cindy Burger. Both times they played, it was a dead rubber. The Netherlands lost their first round in the World Group to Belarus, but beat Slovakia in the playoffs, for staying in the World Group in 2018.

Rus went on a three-match losing streak, which included a qualifying round at the Morocco Open. She broke this streak at the singles qualifying at the French Open, where she won her first two matches against Viktoriya Tomova and Antonia Lottner. She lost the last qualification match against compatriot Quirine Lemoine in three sets, despite having a match point.

Rus received a wildcard for the Rosmalen Open, her WTA Tour home tournament. It was her first grass-court tournament since 2014. In round one, she upset 36th-ranked Tímea Babos in a three-setter, and won her second-round match against Andrea Hlaváčková, in straight sets. In the quarterfinals, she lost to eventual runner-up, Natalia Vikhlyantseva, in straight sets. This performance marked Rus's first wins at tour-level since the 2013 Gastein Ladies where she also had reached the quarterfinals. This also marked the first time Rus winning a main-draw grass-court match since the 2012 Wimbledon Championships. As a result, she moved up 25 spots in the WTA rankings from 183 to No. 158, her highest rank in almost three years.

She won her first WTA Tour title in the Swedish Open at Båstad, partnering with Quirine Lemoine. In the on-court television interview after the win, Lemoine explained that it was even more special because the two had been friends since they were ten years old.

=== 2018–19: Return to French Open, record ITF titles in a calendar year ===
She returned to the 2018 French Open after four years of absence at Roland Garros. After winning the $25k event in Orlando, Florida in November, Arantxa Rus created history in 2019 by claiming her tenth ITF singles title of the year, the most in any one calendar year for men or women.

=== 2020–23: First WTA Tour singles title & top 50 ===
Following the 2023 French Open, she returned to the top 100 in singles on 12 June 2023.

She won her maiden singles title at the 2023 Hamburg European Open defeating Noma Noha Akugue in the final. At 32 years of age, she became the oldest first-time finalist at a WTA tournament in 17 years, and the eighth first-time champion in the season. She was also the oldest first-time WTA Tour champion in the last 40 years.

=== 2024: Olympic debut and WTA 125 finals ===
Rus reached the quarterfinals of three WTA Tour tournaments during the first four months of the season: the Hobart International in January, the Transylvania Open in February and the Rouen Open in April.

In July, Rus made her Olympic debut in Paris, representing the Netherlands in both singles and doubles. In the singles event, she defeated Olivia Gadecki in the first round, before losing to eventual gold medalist Zheng Qinwen in the second. In the doubles event, she partnered with Demi Schuurs, losing in the opening round to French pair Caroline Garcia and Diane Parry.

In August, Rus reached both the singles and doubles finals at the Hamburg Open, which was held as a WTA 125 event that year. In singles, she lost to Anna Bondár, who also defeated Rus and her partner Nina Stojanović in the doubles final alongside Kimberley Zimmermann. Later that month, Rus reached the quarterfinals at the 2024 Cleveland Open, defeating Lucia Bronzetti and seventh seed Viktoriya Tomova before losing to eventual champion McCartney Kessler.

In October, she reached another quarterfinal at the Jiangxi Open, where she defeated Yuliia Starodubtseva and Linda Fruhvirtová, before losing to Viktorija Golubic. She finished the season ranked world No. 81 in singles.

=== 2025: WTA Tour and WTA 125 doubles finals ===
At the 2025 French Open, Rus reached the second round after defeating Camila Osorio, before losing to 22nd seed Clara Tauson.

In July, Rus reached the doubles final at the Hamburg Open, partnering with Anna Bondár. They lost to top seeds Nadiia Kichenok and Makoto Ninomiya in a deciding match tiebreak. It was Rus's third career WTA Tour doubles final.

In August, she reached the singles final of the W100 tournament in Maspalomas, Gran Canaria, losing to Kaitlin Quevedo in three sets. The following month, she reached the doubles final at the Montreux Ladies Open, a WTA 125 event, alongside Romanian Anca Todoni. They were defeated by Oksana Selekhmeteva and Simona Waltert in straight sets.

Rus ended the season ranked world No. 139 in singles.

=== 2026: Ranking decline and US Open appearance ===
Rus struggled to regain her previous form during the 2026 season. She qualified for the singles main draw of the US Open, where she lost in the first round to French wildcard entrant Léolia Jeanjean, in straight sets. By the end of September, her singles ranking had dropped to world No. 258.

== Performance timelines ==
Key
W	F	SF	QF	#R	RR	Q#	P#	DNQ	A	Z#	PO	G	S	B	NMS	NTI	P	NH

(W) winner; (F) finalist; (SF) semifinalist; (QF) quarterfinalist; (#R) rounds 4, 3, 2, 1; (RR) round-robin stage; (Q#) qualification round; (P#) preliminary round; (DNQ) did not qualify; (A) absent; (Z#) Davis/Fed Cup Zonal Group (with number indication) or (PO) play-off; (G) gold, (S) silver or (B) bronze Olympic/Paralympic medal; (NMS) not a Masters tournament; (NTI) not a Tier I tournament; (P) postponed; (NH) not held; (SR) strike rate (events won / competed); (W–L) win–loss record.
To avoid confusion and double counting, these charts are updated at the conclusion of a tournament or when the player's participation has ended.

Only main-draw results in WTA Tour, Grand Slam tournaments, Billie Jean King Cup, United Cup, Hopman Cup and Olympic Games are included in win–loss records.

=== Singles ===
Current through the 2025 US Open.

Tournament	2007	2008	2009	2010	2011	2012	2013	2014	2015	2016	2017	2018	2019	2020	2021	2022	2023	2024	2025	SR	W–L	Win %
Grand Slam tournaments
Australian Open	A	A	Q2	Q1	2R	1R	1R	Q1	A	A	Q1	Q1	Q1	2R	1R	1R	Q1	2R	1R	0 / 8	3–8	27%
French Open	A	A	2R	Q2	3R	4R	1R	Q2	A	A	Q3	1R	Q1	1R	1R	1R	1R	2R	2R	0 / 11	8–11	42%
Wimbledon	A	A	Q1	1R	Q2	3R	1R	Q1	A	A	Q1	1R	Q3	NH	1R	1R	Q2	2R	1R	0 / 8	3–8	27%
US Open	A	A	1R	Q2	2R	1R	A	Q1	A	A	Q1	1R	Q1	1R	1R	1R	1R	2R	Q3	0 / 9	2–9	18%
Win–Loss	0–0	0–0	1–2	0–1	4–3	5–4	0–3	0–0	0–0	0–0	0–0	0–3	0–0	1–3	0–4	0–4	0–2	4–4	1–3	0 / 36	16–36	31%
National representation
Summer Olympics	NH	A	NH			A	NH			A	NH				A	NH		2R	NH	0 / 1	1–1	50%
Billie Jean King Cup (Note: Formerly known as Fed Cup until 2020.)	A	POZ1	Z1	Z1	POZ1	Z1	Z1	PO2	PO	SF	1R	1R	WG2	QR (Note: Edition is split into the two years due to COVID-19.)		QR	PO	PO	A	0 / 3	18–16	53%
WTA 1000
Qatar Open (Note: The first Premier 5 event of the year has switched back and forth between the Dubai Tennis Championships and the Qatar Ladies Open since 2009. Dubai was classified as a Premier 5 event from 2009 to 2011 before being succeeded by Doha for the 2012–2014 period. In 2015, Dubai regained its Premier 5 status while Doha was demoted to Premier status. The Premier 5 tournaments were reclassified as WTA 1000 tournaments in 2021.)	NMS					Q1	A	A	NMS	A	NMS	A	NMS	A	NMS	2R	NMS	1R	A	0 / 2	1–2	33%
Dubai	NMS		A	A	A	NMS			A	NMS	A	NMS	A	NMS	A	NMS	A	1R	Q1	0 / 1	0–1	0%
Indian Wells Open	A	A	A	Q2	Q1	1R	1R	A	A	A	A	Q1	Q1	NH	2R	1R	1R	1R	A	0 / 6	1–6	14%
Miami Open	A	A	1R	1R	1R	Q2	1R	A	Q1	A	A	A	Q2	NH	2R	1R	A	2R	A	0 / 7	2–7	22%
Madrid Open	NH		A	A	1R	A	A	A	A	A	A	A	A	NH	Q1	A	2R	2R	Q1	0 / 3	2–3	40%
Italian Open	A	A	A	A	A	A	A	A	A	A	A	A	A	2R	A	A	1R	1R	1R	0 / 4	1–4	25%
Canadian Open	A	A	A	Q2	A	1R	A	A	A	A	A	A	A	NH	A	A	A	A	A	0 / 1	0–1	0%
Cincinnati Open	A	A	A	A	A	Q1	A	A	A	A	A	A	A	2R	A	A	A	A	A	0 / 1	1–1	50%
Guadalajara Open	NH															A	1R	NMS		0 / 1	0–1	0%
China Open	NMS		A	A	A	A	A	A	A	A	A	A	A	NH			1R	A	A	0 / 1	0–1	0%
Pan Pacific / Wuhan Open (Note: In 2014, the Pan Pacific Open was downgraded to a Premier event and replaced by the Wuhan Open. The Premier 5 tournaments were reclassified as WTA 1000 tournaments in 2021.)	A	A	A	A	1R	A	A	A	A	A	A	A	A	NH				A	A	0 / 1	0–1	0%
Win–Loss	0–0	0–0	0–1	0–1	0–3	0–2	0–2	0–0	0–0	0–0	0–0	0–0	0–0	2–2	2–2	1–3	1–5	2–6	0–1	0 / 28	8–28	22%
Career statistics
	2007	2008	2009	2010	2011	2012	2013	2014	2015	2016	2017	2018	2019	2020	2021	2022	2023	2024	2025	SR	W–L	Win %
Tournaments	1	4	8	9	10	15	13	0 (Note: During the season, she did not play in the main draw of any tour-level tournaments. However, she played at the Billie Jean King Cup (not counted as a played tournament but matches count).)	1	1	4	9	6	10	15	13	11	24	10	Career total: 164		
Titles	0	0	0	0	0	0	0	0	0	0	0	0	0	0	0	0	1	0	0	Career total: 1		
Finals	0	0	0	0	0	0	0	0	0	0	0	0	0	0	0	0	1	0	0	Career total: 1		
Overall win–loss	0–1	5–5	4–9	7–10	7–10	10–15	4–14	1–1	3–2	0–2	4–4	6–10	4–8	8–12	9–16	6–15	8–11	20–26	3–10	1 / 164	109–181	38%
Year-end ranking	465	188	107	138	84	68	160	230	289	174	160	109	103	73	62	117	51	81	139	$4,853,175		

=== Doubles ===
Tournament	2011	2012	2013	...	2020	2021	2022	2023	2024	2025	SR	W–L	Win%
Grand Slam tournaments
Australian Open	A	1R	1R		A	2R	1R	A	1R	1R	0 / 6	1–6	14%
French Open	A	A	1R		2R	2R	A	A	2R	A	0 / 4	3–4	43%
Wimbledon	A	1R	A		NH	3R	2R	A	1R	1R	0 / 5	3–5	38%
US Open	1R	1R	A		A	1R	1R	3R	1R	A	0 / 6	2–6	25%
Win–Loss	0–1	0–3	0–2		1–1	4–4	1–3	2–1	1–4	0–2	0 / 21	9–21	30%
WTA 1000
Dubai / Qatar Open	A	A	A		A	A	1R	A	2R	A	0 / 2	1–2	33%
Indian Wells Open	A	A	A		NH	1R	A	A	A	A	0 / 1	0–1	0%
Miami Open	A	A	A		NH	1R	A	A	A	A	0 / 1	0–1	0%
Madrid Open	A	A	A		NH	A	A	A	A	A	0 / 0	0–0	–
Italian Open	A	A	A		1R	A	A	A	2R	A	0 / 2	1–2	33%
Canadian Open	A	A	A		NH	A	A	A	A	A	0 / 0	0–0	–
Cincinnati Open	A	A	A		A	A	A	A	A	A	0 / 0	0–0	–
Pan Pacific / Wuhan Open (Note: In 2014, the Pan Pacific Open was downgraded to a Premier event and replaced by the Wuhan Open. The Premier 5 tournaments were reclassified as WTA 1000 tournaments in 2021.)	A	A	A		NH				A	A	0 / 0	0–0	–
China Open	A	A	A		NH			A	A	A	0 / 0	0–0	–

== WTA Tour finals ==
=== Singles: 1 (title) ===
Legend WTA 250 (1–0)	Finals by surface Clay (1–0)	Finals by setting Outdoor (1–0)

Result	W–L	Date	Tournament	Tier	Surface	Opponent	Score
Win	1–0	Jul 2023	Hamburg Open, Germany	WTA 250	Clay	(Germany) Noma Noha Akugue	6–0, 7–6^{(7–3)}

=== Doubles: 7 (4 titles, 3 runner-ups) ===
Legend WTA 500 (0–0) WTA 250 (Note: The WTA International tournaments were reclassified as WTA 250 tournaments in 2021.) (4–3)	Finals by surface Hard (2–0) Clay (2–3)	Finals by setting Outdoor (2–3) Indoor (2–0)

Result	W–L	Date	Tournament	Tier	Surface	Partner	Opponents	Score
Win	1–0	Jul 2017	Bastad Open, Sweden	International	Clay	(Netherlands) Quirine Lemoine	(Argentina) María Irigoyen (Czech Republic) Barbora Krejčíková	3–6, 6–3, [10–8]
Loss	1–1	Jul 2019	Palermo Ladies Open, Italy	International	Clay	(Georgia (country)) Ekaterine Gorgodze	(Sweden) Cornelia Lister (Czech Republic) Renata Voráčová	6–7^{(2–7)}, 2–6
Win	2–1	Aug 2020	Palermo Ladies Open, Italy	International	Clay	(Slovenia) Tamara Zidanšek	(Italy) Elisabetta Cocciaretto (Italy) Martina Trevisan	7–5, 7–5
Win	3–1	Nov 2020	Ladies Linz, Austria	International	Hard (i)	(Slovenia) Tamara Zidanšek	(Czech Republic) Lucie Hradecká (Czech Republic) Kateřina Siniaková	6–3, 6–4
Win	4–1	Mar 2021	Lyon Open, France	WTA 250	Hard (i)	(Slovakia) Viktória Kužmová	(Canada) Eugenie Bouchard (Serbia) Olga Danilović	3–6, 7–5, [10–7]
Loss	4–2	Oct 2022	Parma Open, Italy	WTA 250	Clay	(Slovenia) Tamara Zidanšek	(Czech Republic) Anastasia Dețiuc (Czech Republic) Miriam Kolodziejová	6–1, 3–6, [8–10]
Loss	4–3	Jul 2025	Hamburg Open, Germany	WTA 250	Clay	(Hungary) Anna Bondár	(Ukraine) Nadiia Kichenok (Japan) Makoto Ninomiya	4–6, 6–3, [9–11]

== WTA 125 finals ==
=== Singles: 6 (2 titles, 4 runner-ups) ===
Result	W–L	Date	Tournament	Surface	Opponent	Score
Loss	0–1	Nov 2017	Taipei Open, Taiwan	Carpet (i)	(Switzerland) Belinda Bencic	6–7^{(3–7)}, 1–6
Loss	0–2	Jun 2021	Bol Ladies Open, Croatia	Clay	(Italy) Jasmine Paolini	2–6, 6–7^{(4–7)}
Loss	0–3	Jul 2021	Belgrade Challenger, Serbia	Clay	(Slovakia) Anna Karolína Schmiedlová	3–6, 3–6
Win	1–3	Jun 2023	Internacional de La Bisbal, Spain	Clay	(Hungary) Panna Udvardy	7–6^{(7–2)}, 6–3
Win	2–3	Jul 2023	Contrexéville Open, France	Clay	(Russia) Anastasia Pavlyuchenkova	6–3, 6–3
Loss	2–4	Aug 2024	Hamburg Open, Germany	Clay	(Hungary) Anna Bondár	4–6, 2–6

=== Doubles: 3 (3 runner-ups) ===
Result	W–L	Date	Tournament	Surface	Partner	Opponents	Score
Loss	0–1	Jun 2022	Internacional de Valencia, Spain	Clay	(Russia) Alexandra Panova	(Spain) Aliona Bolsova (Spain) Rebeka Masarova	0–6, 3–6
Loss	0–2	Aug 2024	Hamburg Open, Germany	Clay	(Serbia) Nina Stojanović	(Hungary) Anna Bondár (Belgium) Kimberley Zimmermann	7–5, 3–6, [9–11]
Loss	0–3	Sep 2025	Montreux Ladies Open, Switzerland	Clay	(Romania) Anca Todoni	Oksana Selekhmeteva (Switzerland) Simona Waltert	4–6, 1–6

== ITF Circuit finals ==
=== Singles: 49 (33 titles, 16 runner-ups) ===
Legend $100,000 tournaments (0–3) $80,000 tournaments (1–0) $50/60,000 tournaments (6–5) $40,000 tournaments (2–0) $25,000 tournaments (22–7) $10,000 tournaments (2–1)	Finals by surface Hard (7–10) Clay (25–5) Carpet (1–1)

Result	W–L	Date	Tournament	Tier	Surface	Opponent	Score
Win	1–0	Aug 2007	ITF Vlaardingen, Netherlands	10,000	Clay	(Germany) Anne Schäfer	6–7^{(5)}, 6–2, 6–2
Win	2–0	Sep 2007	ITF Alphen a/d Rijn, Netherlands	10,000	Clay	(Netherlands) Renée Reinhard	4–6, 7–5, 7–6^{(2)}
Loss	2–1	Oct 2007	ITF San Luis Potosí, Mexico	25,000	Hard	(Colombia) Mariana Duque Mariño	6–3, 4–6, 3–6
Win	3–1	Apr 2008	ITF Bari, Italy	25,000	Clay	(Italy) Alberta Brianti	2–6, 7–5, 6–3
Loss	3–2	Jul 2008	ITF Zwevegem, Belgium	25,000	Clay	(Belarus) Ksenia Milevskaya	4–6, 6–3, 6–7^{(5)}
Win	4–2	Nov 2008	ITF Opole, Poland	25,000	Carpet (i)	(Croatia) Ana Vrljić	4–6, 7–5, 6–3
Win	5–2	Nov 2009	Open Nantes Atlantique, France	50,000	Hard (i)	(Czech Republic) Renata Voráčová	6–3, 6–2
Loss	5–3	Feb 2011	ITF Stockholm, Sweden	25,000	Hard (i)	(France) Kristina Mladenovic	3–6, 4–6
Loss	5–4	May 2011	Open Saint-Gaudens, France	50,000	Clay	(Russia) Anastasia Pivovarova	6–7^{(4)}, 7–6^{(3)}, 2–6
Loss	5–5	Jul 2011	International Country Cuneo, Italy	100,000	Clay	(Georgia (country)) Anna Tatishvili	4–6, 3–6
Win	6–5	Apr 2012	Osprey Challenger, United States	50,000	Clay	(Kazakhstan) Sesil Karatantcheva	6–4, 6–1
Win	7–5	Sep 2013	ITF Fleurus, Belgium	25,000	Clay	(Latvia) Diāna Marcinkēviča	6–3, 6–2
Win	8–5	Sep 2013	ITF Alphen a/d Rijn, Netherlands	25,000	Clay	(Germany) Carina Witthöft	4–6, 6–2, 6–2
Win	9–5	Oct 2013	ITF Vallduxo, Spain	25,000	Clay	(France) Alizé Lim	6–1, 6–1
Win	10–5	Oct 2013	ITF Sant Cugat, Spain	25,000	Clay	(Italy) Alberta Brianti	6–4, 2–6, 6–2
Loss	10–6	Jun 2015	ITF Zeeland, Netherlands	10,000	Hard	(Netherlands) Quirine Lemoine	1–6, 2–6
Loss	10–7	Feb 2016	AK Ladies Open, Germany	25,000	Carpet (i)	(Belgium) Ysaline Bonaventure	3–6, 3–6
Win	11–7	Oct 2016	ITF Hua Hin, Thailand	25,000	Hard	(Thailand) Nicha Lertpitaksinchai	3–6, 7–6^{(4)}, 7–6^{(3)}
Win	12–7	Oct 2016	ITF Équeurdreville, France	25,000	Hard (i)	(Belgium) Maryna Zanevska	6–2, 6–1
Win	13–7	Jul 2017	ITF Middelburg, Netherlands	25,000	Clay	(Greece) Valentini Grammatikopoulou	3–6, 6–2, 6–3
Win	14–7	Sep 2017	ITF Hua Hin, Thailand	25,000	Hard	(United States) Jacqueline Cako	6–1, 6–3
Loss	14–8	Jan 2018	Open Andrézieux-Bouthéon, France	60,000	Hard (i)	(Spain) Georgina García Pérez	2–6, 0–6
Loss	14–9	Nov 2018	ITF Wirral, United Kingdom	25,000	Hard (i)	(Latvia) Diāna Marcinkēviča	6–7^{(2)}, 6–0, 6–7^{(4)}
Loss	14–10	Jan 2019	ITF Singapore	W25	Hard	(India) Ankita Raina	3–6, 2–6
Win	15–10	Apr 2019	ITF Pula, Italy	W25	Clay	(Ukraine) Daria Lopatetska	6–7^{(2)}, 6–3, 6–1
Win	16–10	Apr 2019	ITF Pula, Italy	W25	Clay	(United States) Elizabeth Halbauer	6–2, 6–7^{(6)}, 6–1
Win	17–10	Jul 2019	ITF The Hague, Netherlands	W25	Clay	(Russia) Valentina Ivakhnenko	6–2, 6–2
Win	18–10	Aug 2019	ITF Espinar, Spain	W25	Hard	(Bulgaria) Julia Terziyska	6–4, 6–1
Win	19–10	Aug 2019	ITF Cordenons, Spain	W25	Clay	(Slovenia) Nika Radišič	4–6, 6–4, 6–1
Win	20–10	Sep 2019	ITF Marbella, Spain	W25	Clay	(Spain) Marina Bassols Ribera	6–2, 6–2
Win	21–10	Sep 2019	ITF Pula, Italy	W25	Clay	(Italy) Elisabetta Cocciaretto	6–3, 6–7^{(5)}, 6–4
Win	22–10	Oct 2019	ITF Seville, Spain	W25	Clay	(Romania) Patricia Maria Țig	6–4, 6–4
Win	23–10	Nov 2019	ITF Pétange, Luxemburg	W25	Hard (i)	(Romania) Laura Ioana Paar	6–3, 3–6, 6–3
Win	24–10	Nov 2019	ITF Orlando, United States	W25	Clay	(Romania) Irina Fetecău	6–3, 6–2
Loss	24–11	Jan 2020	Open Andrézieux-Bouthéon, France	W60	Hard (i)	(Belgium) Ysaline Bonaventure	4–6, 6–7^{(3)}
Loss	24–12	May 2021	Solgironès Open, Spain	W60+H	Clay	(Russia) Irina Khromacheva	4–6, 6–1, 6–7^{(8)}
Win	25–12	Aug 2021	ITF San Bartolomé, Spain	W60	Clay	(Egypt) Mayar Sherif	6–4, 6–2
Win	26–12	Aug 2021	ITF San Bartolomé, Spain	W60	Clay	(Andorra) Victoria Jiménez Kasintseva	6–0, 6–1
Win	27–12	Sep 2021	Open de Valencia, Spain	W80	Clay	(Romania) Mihaela Buzărnescu	6–4, 7–6^{(3)}
Win	28–12	May 2022	ITF Santa Margherita die Pula, Italy	W25	Clay	(Belgium) Marie Benoît	6–4, 6–4
Win	29–12	Aug 2022	ITF Gran Canaria Tour, Spain	W60	Clay	(Russia) Polina Kudermetova	6–3, 3–6, 6–1
Loss	29–13	Nov 2022	ITF Haabneeme, Estonia	W25	Hard	(Norway) Malene Helgo	4–6, 2–6
Win	30–13	Nov 2022	ITF Sharm El Sheikh, Egypt	W25	Hard	(Belarus) Yuliya Hatouka	6–2, 6–1
Loss	30–14	Mar 2023	Arcadia Pro Open, United States	W60	Hard	(Italy) Sara Errani	w/o
Win	31–14	Mar 2023	ITF Anapoima, Colombia	W40	Clay	(Austria) Sinja Kraus	6–3, 6–7^{(3)}, 6–2
Win	32–14	Jul 2023	ITF The Hague, Netherlands	W40	Clay	(Czech Republic) Sára Bejlek	7–6^{(3)}, 6–4
Win	33–14	Jul 2024	ITF The Hague, Netherlands	W75	Clay	(Poland) Gina Feistel	6–1, 4–6, 6–2
Loss	33–15	Oct 2024	Women's TEC Cup, Spain	W100	Hard	(Serbia) Olga Danilović	2–6, 0–6
Loss	33–16	Jul 2025	ITF Gran Canaria Tour, Spain	W100	Clay	(Spain) Kaitlin Quevedo	6–4, 2–6, 4–6

=== Doubles: 36 (16 titles, 20 runner-ups) ===
Legend W100 tournaments (1–3) W80 tournaments (1–1) W50/60/75 tournaments (4–4) W40 tournaments (1–0) W25/35 tournaments (9–12)	Finals by surface Hard (7–8) Clay (9–11) Carpet (0–1)

Result	W–L	Date	Tournament	Tier	Surface	Partner	Opponents	Score
Win	1–0	Oct 2007	ITF Mexico City, Mexico	25,000	Hard	(Netherlands) Nicole Thyssen	(Croatia) Ivana Abramović (Croatia) Maria Abramović	6–0, 6–1
Loss	1–1	Nov 2008	ITF Opole, Poland	25,000	Carpet (i)	(Poland) Katarzyna Piter	(Poland) Karolina Kosińska (Poland) Aleksandra Rosolska	6–2, 6–7^{(6)}, [7–10]
Loss	1–2	May 2010	ATV di Roma, Italy	50,000	Clay	(France) Iryna Brémond	(United States) Christina McHale (Australia) Olivia Rogowska	4–6, 1–6
Win	2–2	Feb 2011	ITF Stockholm, Sweden	25,000	Hard (i)	(Belarus) Anastasiya Yakimova	(France) Claire Feuerstein (Russia) Ksenia Lykina	6–3, 2–6, [10–8]
Win	3–2	May 2013	Open de Cagnes-sur-Mer, France	100,000	Clay	(United States) Vania King	(Colombia) Catalina Castaño (Brazil) Teliana Pereira	4–6, 7–5, [10–8]
Loss	3–3	Oct 2013	ITF Vallduxo, Spain	25,000	Clay	(Netherlands) Cindy Burger	(Argentina) Florencia Molinero (France) Laura Thorpe	1–6, 4–6
Win	4–3	Oct 2013	Taipei Cup, Taiwan	50,000	Hard	(Netherlands) Lesley Kerkhove	(Chinese Taipei) Chen Yi (Thailand) Luksika Kumkhum	6–4, 2–6, [14–12]
Loss	4–4	Jun 2014	ITF Stuttgart, Germany	25,000	Clay	(Netherlands) Lesley Kerkhove	(Switzerland) Viktorija Golubic (Germany) Laura Siegemund	3–6, 3–6
Win	5–4	Aug 2014	ITF Fleurus, Belgium	25,000	Clay	(Netherlands) Demi Schuurs	(Sweden) Hilda Melander (Russia) Marina Melnikova	6–4, 6–1
Loss	5–5	Sep 2014	Royal Cup, Montenegro	25,000	Clay	(Switzerland) Xenia Knoll	(Romania) Alexandra Cadanțu (Liechtenstein) Stephanie Vogt	1–6, 6–3, [2–10]
Loss	5–6	Oct 2014	Internacional de Monterrey, México	50,000	Hard	(Belgium) Elise Mertens	(Spain) Lourdes Domínguez Lino (Colombia) Mariana Duque Mariño	3–6, 6–7
Loss	5–7	Jan 2015	ITF Daytona Beach, United States	25,000	Clay	(Belgium) Elise Mertens	(United States) Sanaz Marand (United States) Jan Abaza	4–6, 6–3, [6–10]
Loss	5–8	Sep 2015	ITF Alphen a/d Rijn, Netherlands	25,000	Clay	(Netherlands) Lesley Kerkhove	(Netherlands) Quirine Lemoine (Netherlands) Eva Wacanno	6–3, 4–6, [7–10]
Loss	5–9	Oct 2015	Kirkland Tennis Challenger, US	50,000	Hard	(Netherlands) Lesley Kerkhove	(France) Stéphanie Foretz (Luxembourg) Mandy Minella	4–6, 6–4, [4–10]
Win	6–9	Feb 2016	ITF Beinasco, Italy	25,000	Clay	(Turkey) İpek Soylu	(North Macedonia) Lina Gjorcheska (Bosnia and Herzegovina) Dea Herdzelas	6–4, 6–2
Win	7–9	Apr 2016	Wiesbaden Open, Germany	25,000	Clay	(Belgium) Marie Benoît	(Belgium) Steffi Distelmans (Netherlands) Demi Schuurs	6–2, 6–2
Win	8–9	Sep 2016	Hungarian Pro Open	50,000	Clay	(Netherlands) Cindy Burger	(Hungary) Ágnes Bukta (Czech Republic) Jesika Malečková	6–1, 6–4
Loss	8–10	Aug 2018	Vancouver Open, Canada	100,000	Hard	(Ukraine) Kateryna Kozlova	(United States) Desirae Krawczyk (Mexico) Giuliana Olmos	2–6, 5–7
Loss	8–11	Oct 2018	Internationaux de Poitiers, France	80,000	Hard	(Switzerland) Viktorija Golubic	(Russia) Anna Blinkova (Russia) Alexandra Panova	1–6, 1–6
Win	9–11	Jan 2019	ITF Singapore	W25	Hard	(Netherlands) Quirine Lemoine	(Chinese Taipei) Chen Pei-hsuan (Chinese Taipei) Wu Fang-hsien	6–2, 6–4
Loss	9–12	Sep 2019	ITF Marbella, Spain	W25	Hard	(United Kingdom) Gabriella Taylor	(Spain) Irene Burillo (Spain) Andrea Lázaro García	7–5, 4–6, [4–10]
Loss	9–13	Oct 2019	ITF Seville, Spain	W25	Clay	(Spain) Eva Guerrero Álvarez	(Belgium) Marie Benoît (Germany) Julia Wachaczyk	0–6, 7–6^{(3)}, [4–10]
Loss	9–14	Nov 2019	ITF Pétange, Luxemburg	W25	Hard (i)	(Poland) Katarzyna Piter	(Romania) Laura Ioana Paar (Germany) Julia Wachaczyk	6–7^{(11)}, 6–1, [9–11]
Loss	9–15	Feb 2020	Cairo Open, Egypt	W100	Hard	(Egypt) Mayar Sherif	(Serbia) Aleksandra Krunić (Poland) Katarzyna Piter	4–6, 2–6
Loss	9–16	May 2022	ITF Santa Margherita di Pula, Italy	W25	Clay	(Spain) Leyre Romero Gormaz	(Lithuania) Justina Mikulskytė (Slovenia) Nika Radišić	6–4, 5–7, [7–10]
Win	10–16	Aug 2022	ITF Gran Canaria Tour, Spain	W60	Clay	(Spain) Ángela Fita Boluda	Elina Avanesyan; Diana Shnaider	6–4, 6–4
Win	11–16	Aug 2022	ITF Ourense, Spain	W25	Hard	(United States) Maria Mateas	(Spain) Yvonne Cavallé Reimers (Spain) Lucía Cortez Llorca	6–4, 5–7, [10–7]
Loss	11–17	Nov 2022	ITF Haabneeme, Estonia	W25	Hard	(Slovenia) Dalila Jakupović	(Norway) Malene Helgø (Netherlands) Suzan Lamens	2–6, 1–6
Win	12–17	Nov 2022	ITF Sharm El Sheikh, Egypt	W25	Hard	(Serbia) Nina Stojanović	(Belgium) Magali Kempen (China) Lu Jiajing	7–6^{(1)}, 6–2
Loss	12–18	Apr 2023	ITF Santa Margherita di Pula, Italy	W25	Clay	(Italy) Angelica Moratelli	(Poland) Weronika Falkowska (Greece) Valentini Grammatikopoulou	1–6, 1–6
Win	13–18	Apr 2023	Zaragoza Open, Spain	W80	Clay	(France) Diane Parry	(United States) Asia Muhammad (United Kingdom) Eden Silva	6–1, 4–6, [10–5]
Win	14–18	Jul 2023	ITF The Hague, Netherlands	W40	Clay	(France) Kristina Mladenovic	(Netherlands) Jasmijn Gimbrère (Netherlands) Isabelle Haverlag	6–4, 6–0
Loss	14–19	Aug 2023	ITF Gran Canaria Tour, Spain	W100	Clay	(Spain) Leyre Romero Gormaz	(Hungary) Timea Babos (Hungary) Anna Bondár	4–6, 6–3, [4–10]
Win	15–19	Jul 2025	ITF The Hague, Netherlands	W75	Clay	(Netherlands) Joy de Zeeuw	(Russia) Polina Bakhmutkina (Russia) Kristina Kroitor	6–2, 6–2
Loss	15–20	Sep 2025	ITF Bucharest, Romania	W75	Clay	(Romania) Mara Gae	(Romania) Oana Gavrilă (Greece) Sapfo Sakellaridi	4–6, 2–6
Win	16–20	Aug 2026	ITF Vigo, Spain	W35	Hard	(Spain) Victoria Gómez O'Hayon	Ekaterina Yashina (Kazakhstan) Sonja Zhiyenbayeva	6–3, 6–4

=== Junior Grand Slam tournament finals ===
==== Singles: 1 (title) ====
Result	Year	Tournament	Surface	Opponent	Score
Win	2008	Australian Open	Hard	(Australia) Jessica Moore	6–3, 6–4

== Wins over top 10 players ==
- Match record against players who were, at the time the match was played, ranked in the top 10.

Season	2011	2012	Total
Wins	1	1	2

#	Opponent	Rank	Event	Surface	Rd	Score	ARR
2011
1.	(Belgium) Kim Clijsters	2	French Open, France	Clay	2R	3–6, 7–5, 6–1	114
2012
2.	(Australia) Samantha Stosur	5	Wimbledon, UK	Grass	2R	6–2, 0–6, 6–4	73
