= 2024 ITF Women's World Tennis Tour (January–March) =

The 2024 ITF Women's World Tennis Tour was the 2024 edition of the second-tier tour for women's professional tennis. It was organised by the International Tennis Federation and was a tier below the WTA Tour. The ITF Women's World Tennis Tour included tournaments in five categories with prize money ranging from $15,000 up to $100,000.

== Key ==
Category
W100 tournaments ($100,000)
W75 tournaments ($60,000)
W50 tournaments ($40,000)
W35 tournaments ($25,000)
W15 tournaments ($15,000)

== Month ==
=== January ===
Week of	Tournament	Winner	Runners-up	Semifinalists	Quarterfinalists
January 1	Nonthaburi, Thailand; Hard; W50; Singles and doubles draws	(Croatia) Antonia Ružić; 6–1, 6–3	(Japan) Sara Saito	(Thailand) Patcharin Cheapchandej (Japan) Ena Shibahara	(Thailand) Punnin Kovapitukted (Japan) Sayaka Ishii (United States) Catherine Harrison (Finland) Anastasia Kulikova
January 1	Nonthaburi, Thailand; Hard; W50; Singles and doubles draws	(Kazakhstan) Zhibek Kulambayeva (Greece) Sapfo Sakellaridi; Walkover	(Thailand) Lanlana Tararudee (Chinese Taipei) Tsao Chia-yi	(Thailand) Patcharin Cheapchandej (Japan) Ena Shibahara	(Thailand) Punnin Kovapitukted (Japan) Sayaka Ishii (United States) Catherine Harrison (Finland) Anastasia Kulikova
January 1	Arcadia Women's Pro Open; Arcadia, United States; Hard; W35; Singles and doubles draws	(United States) Fiona Crawley; 4–6, 6–2, 7–5	(United States) Ashley Lahey	(China) Tian Fangran (Poland) Olivia Lincer	(United States) Hanna Chang (United States) Sophie Chang (United States) Victoria Hu (United States) Liv Hovde
January 1	Arcadia Women's Pro Open; Arcadia, United States; Hard; W35; Singles and doubles draws	(United States) Angela Kulikov (United States) Ashley Lahey; 6–3, 6–2	(United States) Haley Giavara (United States) Brandy Walker	(China) Tian Fangran (Poland) Olivia Lincer	(United States) Hanna Chang (United States) Sophie Chang (United States) Victoria Hu (United States) Liv Hovde
January 1	Monastir, Tunisia; Hard; W15; Singles and doubles draws	(Czech Republic) Amélie Šmejkalová; 6–2, 6–3	(Germany) Tessa Brockmann	(Morocco) Malak El Allami (Poland) Malwina Rowińska	(France) Yasmine Mansouri; Milana Zhabrailova (Romania) Ștefania Bojică (France) Alyssa Réguer
January 1	Monastir, Tunisia; Hard; W15; Singles and doubles draws	(Japan) Anri Nagata (Japan) Rinon Okuwaki; 6–2, 7–6^{(7–5)}	(Belgium) Tilwith Di Girolami (France) Yasmine Mansouri	(Morocco) Malak El Allami (Poland) Malwina Rowińska	(France) Yasmine Mansouri; Milana Zhabrailova (Romania) Ștefania Bojică (France) Alyssa Réguer
January 8	Nonthaburi, Thailand; Hard; W50; Singles and doubles draws	(Thailand) Mananchaya Sawangkaew; 6–1, 2–6, 6–2	(Croatia) Antonia Ružić	(Japan) Sayaka Ishii (Japan) Sara Saito	(Slovenia) Dalila Jakupović (Japan) Misaki Matsuda (United Kingdom) Katie Swan (United States) Catherine Harrison
January 8	Nonthaburi, Thailand; Hard; W50; Singles and doubles draws	(Czech Republic) Anna Sisková; Ksenia Zaytseva; 7–5, 7–6^{(7–3)}	(Poland) Maja Chwalińska (Japan) Yuki Naito	(Japan) Sayaka Ishii (Japan) Sara Saito	(Slovenia) Dalila Jakupović (Japan) Misaki Matsuda (United Kingdom) Katie Swan (United States) Catherine Harrison
January 8	Antalya, Turkey; Clay; W35; Singles and doubles draws	(Romania) Cristina Dinu; 6–3, 1–0 ret.	(Ukraine) Anastasiya Soboleva	(Romania) Maria Sara Popa (Romania) Ilinca Amariei	(Hungary) Amarissa Kiara Tóth (Turkey) Ayla Aksu (Bulgaria) Isabella Shinikova (Switzerland) Ylena In-Albon
January 8	Antalya, Turkey; Clay; W35; Singles and doubles draws	(Romania) Cristina Dinu (Slovenia) Nika Radišić; 6–2, 3–6, [13–11]	Amina Anshba (Ukraine) Valeriya Strakhova	(Romania) Maria Sara Popa (Romania) Ilinca Amariei	(Hungary) Amarissa Kiara Tóth (Turkey) Ayla Aksu (Bulgaria) Isabella Shinikova (Switzerland) Ylena In-Albon
January 8	GB Pro-Series Loughborough; Loughborough, United Kingdom; Hard (i); W35; Singles and doubles draws	(United Kingdom) Sonay Kartal; 6–4, 6–1	(France) Manon Léonard	(United Kingdom) Ranah Stoiber (Germany) Nastasja Schunk	(Czech Republic) Barbora Palicová (Switzerland) Valentina Ryser (Finland) Laura Hietaranta (United States) Liv Hovde
January 8	GB Pro-Series Loughborough; Loughborough, United Kingdom; Hard (i); W35; Singles and doubles draws	(United States) Liv Hovde (United Kingdom) Ella McDonald; 4–6, 6–2, [10–7]	(United Kingdom) Alicia Barnett (United Kingdom) Sarah Beth Grey	(United Kingdom) Ranah Stoiber (Germany) Nastasja Schunk	(Czech Republic) Barbora Palicová (Switzerland) Valentina Ryser (Finland) Laura Hietaranta (United States) Liv Hovde
January 8	Naples Women's World Tennis Tour; Naples, United States; Clay; W35; Singles and doubles draws	(United States) Clervie Ngounoue; 6–1, 6–1	(United States) Allie Kiick	(United States) Louisa Chirico (Kenya) Angella Okutoyi	(Georgia (country)) Ekaterine Gorgodze (United States) Varvara Lepchenko (Canada) Layne Sleeth (Belgium) Marie Benoît
January 8	Naples Women's World Tennis Tour; Naples, United States; Clay; W35; Singles and doubles draws	(Belgium) Marie Benoît (Switzerland) Leonie Küng; 6–7^{(6–8)}, 6–2, [10–8]	(Japan) Mayuka Aikawa (Chinese Taipei) Hsu Chieh-yu	(United States) Louisa Chirico (Kenya) Angella Okutoyi	(Georgia (country)) Ekaterine Gorgodze (United States) Varvara Lepchenko (Canada) Layne Sleeth (Belgium) Marie Benoît
January 8	Fort-de-France, Martinique, France; Hard; W15; Singles and doubles draws	(France) Jenny Lim; 4–6, 6–2, 6–2	(Germany) Antonia Schmidt	(Morocco) Yasmine Kabbaj (France) Astrid Lew Yan Foon	(United States) Jaeda Daniel (France) Pauline Payet (Belgium) Vicky Van de Peer (Romania) Briana Szabó
January 8	Fort-de-France, Martinique, France; Hard; W15; Singles and doubles draws	(Germany) Laura Böhner (Germany) Angelina Wirges; 3–6, 6–0, [10–8]	(United States) Ashton Bowers (Romania) Briana Szabó	(Morocco) Yasmine Kabbaj (France) Astrid Lew Yan Foon	(United States) Jaeda Daniel (France) Pauline Payet (Belgium) Vicky Van de Peer (Romania) Briana Szabó
January 8	Esch-sur-Alzette, Luxembourg; Hard (i); W15; Singles and doubles draws	(Ukraine) Veronika Podrez; 6–4, 6–3	(Germany) Carolina Kuhl	(Belgium) Tilwith Di Girolami (Austria) Tamara Kostic	(Slovenia) Nina Potočnik (Belgium) Amelia Waligora (Netherlands) Merel Hoedt (Czech Republic) Aneta Kučmová
January 8	Esch-sur-Alzette, Luxembourg; Hard (i); W15; Singles and doubles draws	(Germany) Tayisiya Morderger (Germany) Yana Morderger; 6–2, 6–3	(Germany) Josy Daems (Ukraine) Anastasiia Firman	(Belgium) Tilwith Di Girolami (Austria) Tamara Kostic	(Slovenia) Nina Potočnik (Belgium) Amelia Waligora (Netherlands) Merel Hoedt (Czech Republic) Aneta Kučmová
January 8	Monastir, Tunisia; Hard; W15; Singles and doubles draws	(Slovakia) Nina Vargová; 6–1, 6–1	Milana Zhabrailova	(Germany) Tessa Brockmann (Japan) Nana Kawagishi	(France) Yasmine Mansouri (China) Yuan Chengyiyi (Japan) Nagi Hanatani (Italy) Angelica Raggi
January 8	Monastir, Tunisia; Hard; W15; Singles and doubles draws	(France) Yasmine Mansouri (France) Nina Radovanovic; 6–4, 6–2	(Slovakia) Nina Vargová (Slovakia) Radka Zelníčková	(Germany) Tessa Brockmann (Japan) Nana Kawagishi	(France) Yasmine Mansouri (China) Yuan Chengyiyi (Japan) Nagi Hanatani (Italy) Angelica Raggi
January 15	Bangalore, India; Hard; W50; Singles and doubles draws	(Latvia) Darja Semeņistaja; 6–1, 3–0 ret.	(France) Carole Monnet	(Japan) Naho Sato (India) Rutuja Bhosale	Polina Kudermetova (Japan) Mei Yamaguchi (Japan) Moyuka Uchijima (France) Chloé Paquet
January 15	Bangalore, India; Hard; W50; Singles and doubles draws	(Italy) Camilla Rosatello (Latvia) Darja Semeņistaja; 3–6, 6–2, [10–8]	(Chinese Taipei) Li Yu-yun (Japan) Eri Shimizu	(Japan) Naho Sato (India) Rutuja Bhosale	Polina Kudermetova (Japan) Mei Yamaguchi (Japan) Moyuka Uchijima (France) Chloé Paquet
January 15	Antalya, Turkey; Clay; W50; Singles and doubles draws	(Spain) Guiomar Maristany; 6–4, 6–1	(Slovenia) Polona Hercog	(Romania) Ilinca Amariei (Slovenia) Ela Nala Milić	(Ukraine) Valeriya Strakhova (Spain) Ángela Fita Boluda (Spain) Andrea Lázaro García (Japan) Shiho Akita
January 15	Antalya, Turkey; Clay; W50; Singles and doubles draws	Anastasiia Gureva; Alexandra Shubladze; 6–3, 6–2	(Spain) Ángela Fita Boluda (Latvia) Daniela Vismane	(Romania) Ilinca Amariei (Slovenia) Ela Nala Milić	(Ukraine) Valeriya Strakhova (Spain) Ángela Fita Boluda (Spain) Andrea Lázaro García (Japan) Shiho Akita
January 15	Buenos Aires, Argentina; Clay; W35; Singles and doubles draws	(Romania) Maria Sara Popa; 6–2, 6–0	(Switzerland) Ylena In-Albon	(France) Sara Cakarevic (Italy) Nicole Fossa Huergo	(Chile) Daniela Seguel (Mexico) Ana Sofía Sánchez (Argentina) Julieta Lara Estable; Daria Lodikova
January 15	Buenos Aires, Argentina; Clay; W35; Singles and doubles draws	(Italy) Nicole Fossa Huergo (Italy) Miriana Tona; 7–5, 6–3	(Argentina) Melany Krywoj (Bolivia) Noelia Zeballos	(France) Sara Cakarevic (Italy) Nicole Fossa Huergo	(Chile) Daniela Seguel (Mexico) Ana Sofía Sánchez (Argentina) Julieta Lara Estable; Daria Lodikova
January 15	Petit-Bourg, Guadeloupe, France; Hard; W35; Singles and doubles draws	(Sweden) Fanny Östlund; 4–6, 6–4, 6–3	(United States) Maria Mateas	(France) Emma Léné (United States) Ashton Bowers	(France) Astrid Lew Yan Foon (Canada) Isabelle Boulais (Sweden) Jacqueline Cabaj Awad (France) Sarah Iliev
January 15	Petit-Bourg, Guadeloupe, France; Hard; W35; Singles and doubles draws	(Switzerland) Jenny Dürst (Sweden) Fanny Östlund; 6–2, 7–5	(Germany) Sina Herrmann (Germany) Antonia Schmidt	(France) Emma Léné (United States) Ashton Bowers	(France) Astrid Lew Yan Foon (Canada) Isabelle Boulais (Sweden) Jacqueline Cabaj Awad (France) Sarah Iliev
January 15	Monastir, Tunisia; Hard; W35; Singles and doubles draws	(Croatia) Lucija Ćirić Bagarić; 7–5, 6–2	Polina Iatcenko	(Belgium) Lara Salden; Milana Zhabrailova	(Spain) Carlota Martínez Círez (Italy) Dalila Spiteri (Slovakia) Radka Zelníčková (Spain) Irene Burillo Escorihuela
January 15	Monastir, Tunisia; Hard; W35; Singles and doubles draws	(Belgium) Ema Kovacevic (Belgium) Lara Salden; 3–6, 6–1, [10–8]	(Romania) Oana Gavrilă (France) Yasmine Mansouri	(Belgium) Lara Salden; Milana Zhabrailova	(Spain) Carlota Martínez Círez (Italy) Dalila Spiteri (Slovakia) Radka Zelníčková (Spain) Irene Burillo Escorihuela
January 15	GB Pro-Series Sunderland; Sunderland, United Kingdom; Hard (i); W35; Singles and doubles draws	(Switzerland) Valentina Ryser; 6–3, 7–6^{(8–6)}	(Czech Republic) Nikola Bartůňková	(Georgia (country)) Mariam Bolkvadze (France) Loïs Boisson	(Liechtenstein) Kathinka von Deichmann (United Kingdom) Sarah Beth Grey (United States) Liv Hovde (Poland) Urszula Radwańska
January 15	GB Pro-Series Sunderland; Sunderland, United Kingdom; Hard (i); W35; Singles and doubles draws	(Finland) Laura Hietaranta (United Kingdom) Ella McDonald; 6–4, 6–1	(France) Julie Belgraver (Slovakia) Katarína Strešnáková	(Georgia (country)) Mariam Bolkvadze (France) Loïs Boisson	(Liechtenstein) Kathinka von Deichmann (United Kingdom) Sarah Beth Grey (United States) Liv Hovde (Poland) Urszula Radwańska
January 15	Naples Women's World Tennis Tour; Naples, United States; Clay; W35; Singles and doubles draws	(Belgium) Marie Benoît; 6–4, 1–6, 6–4	(Switzerland) Leonie Küng	(United States) Robin Montgomery (Italy) Jessica Pieri	(United States) Louisa Chirico (United States) Vivian Wolff (United States) Madison Sieg (Romania) Gabriela Lee
January 15	Naples Women's World Tennis Tour; Naples, United States; Clay; W35; Singles and doubles draws	(United States) Elvina Kalieva; Maria Kozyreva; 6–0, 6–0	(Netherlands) Isabelle Haverlag (Bulgaria) Lia Karatancheva	(United States) Robin Montgomery (Italy) Jessica Pieri	(United States) Louisa Chirico (United States) Vivian Wolff (United States) Madison Sieg (Romania) Gabriela Lee
January 22	Porto Women's Indoor ITF; Porto, Portugal; Hard (i); W75+H; Singles – Doubles	(Spain) Jéssica Bouzas Maneiro; 3–6, 6–0, 6–4	(Poland) Maja Chwalińska	(France) Elsa Jacquemot (Austria) Sinja Kraus	(Spain) Marina Bassols Ribera (Liechtenstein) Kathinka von Deichmann (United States) Robin Anderson (Slovenia) Veronika Erjavec
January 22	Porto Women's Indoor ITF; Porto, Portugal; Hard (i); W75+H; Singles – Doubles	(United Kingdom) Sarah Beth Grey (United Kingdom) Olivia Nicholls; 4–6, 6–3, [10–6]	(Portugal) Francisca Jorge (Portugal) Matilde Jorge	(France) Elsa Jacquemot (Austria) Sinja Kraus	(Spain) Marina Bassols Ribera (Liechtenstein) Kathinka von Deichmann (United States) Robin Anderson (Slovenia) Veronika Erjavec
January 22	Vero Beach International Tennis Open; Vero Beach, United States; Clay; W75+H; Singles – Doubles	(Argentina) María Lourdes Carlé; 6–4, 7–6^{(7–4)}	(Romania) Gabriela Lee	(United States) Hailey Baptiste; Maria Kozyreva	(Mexico) Renata Zarazúa (Ukraine) Yulia Starodubtseva (Italy) Tatiana Pieri (United States) Clervie Ngounoue
January 22	Vero Beach International Tennis Open; Vero Beach, United States; Clay; W75+H; Singles – Doubles	(United States) Allura Zamarripa (United States) Maribella Zamarripa; 6–3, 3–6, [10–4]	(United States) Hailey Baptiste (United States) Whitney Osuigwe	(United States) Hailey Baptiste; Maria Kozyreva	(Mexico) Renata Zarazúa (Ukraine) Yulia Starodubtseva (Italy) Tatiana Pieri (United States) Clervie Ngounoue
January 22	Pune, India; Hard; W50; Singles and doubles draws	(Japan) Moyuka Uchijima; 6–4, 6–0	(Australia) Tina Nadine Smith	(Latvia) Darja Semeņistaja (Slovenia) Dalila Jakupović	(Philippines) Alex Eala (Netherlands) Anouk Koevermans (Romania) Anca Todoni; Anastasia Tikhonova
January 22	Pune, India; Hard; W50; Singles and doubles draws	(Philippines) Alex Eala (Latvia) Darja Semeņistaja; 7–6^{(10–8)}, 6–3	(United Kingdom) Naiktha Bains (Hungary) Fanny Stollár	(Latvia) Darja Semeņistaja (Slovenia) Dalila Jakupović	(Philippines) Alex Eala (Netherlands) Anouk Koevermans (Romania) Anca Todoni; Anastasia Tikhonova
January 22	Buenos Aires, Argentina; Clay; W35; Singles and doubles draws	(Argentina) Solana Sierra; 6–1, 6–4	(France) Alice Ramé	(Mexico) Ana Sofía Sánchez (Switzerland) Ylena In-Albon	(Chile) Daniela Seguel (Argentina) Jazmín Ortenzi (Brazil) Carolina Alves (Brazil) Gabriela Cé
January 22	Buenos Aires, Argentina; Clay; W35; Singles and doubles draws	(United States) Jamie Loeb (Mexico) Ana Sofía Sánchez; 7–5, 7–6^{(7–2)}	(Peru) Romina Ccuno; Daria Lodikova	(Mexico) Ana Sofía Sánchez (Switzerland) Ylena In-Albon	(Chile) Daniela Seguel (Argentina) Jazmín Ortenzi (Brazil) Carolina Alves (Brazil) Gabriela Cé
January 22	Le Gosier, Guadeloupe, France; Hard; W35; Singles and doubles draws	(Austria) Tamira Paszek; 6–4, 7–5	(Belgium) Clara Vlasselaer	(United States) Maria Mateas (Serbia) Katarina Kozarov	(Canada) Cadence Brace (Chinese Taipei) Lee Ya-hsuan (France) Emma Léné (Germany) Sina Herrmann
January 22	Le Gosier, Guadeloupe, France; Hard; W35; Singles and doubles draws	(United States) Jaeda Daniel (United States) Haley Giavara; 6–2, 7–6^{(7–0)}	(France) Émeline Dartron (France) Emma Léné	(United States) Maria Mateas (Serbia) Katarina Kozarov	(Canada) Cadence Brace (Chinese Taipei) Lee Ya-hsuan (France) Emma Léné (Germany) Sina Herrmann
January 22	Monastir, Tunisia; Hard; W35; Singles and doubles draws	(Canada) Carson Branstine; 6–2, 6–2	(Andorra) Victoria Jiménez Kasintseva	(Croatia) Lucija Ćirić Bagarić (Spain) Leyre Romero Gormaz	(Italy) Nuria Brancaccio (Spain) Irene Burillo Escorihuela; Anastasia Gasanova (Denmark) Rebecca Munk Mortensen
January 22	Monastir, Tunisia; Hard; W35; Singles and doubles draws	(Slovakia) Katarína Kužmová (Slovakia) Nina Vargová; 6–4, 6–3	(United Kingdom) Madeleine Brooks (United Kingdom) Katy Dunne	(Croatia) Lucija Ćirić Bagarić (Spain) Leyre Romero Gormaz	(Italy) Nuria Brancaccio (Spain) Irene Burillo Escorihuela; Anastasia Gasanova (Denmark) Rebecca Munk Mortensen
January 22	Antalya, Turkey; Clay; W15; Singles and doubles draws	(Spain) Andrea Lázaro García; 4–6, 6–3, 6–1	(Romania) Andreea Prisăcariu	(Slovenia) Pia Lovrič (Switzerland) Sebastianna Scilipoti	(Slovenia) Ela Nala Milić (Bulgaria) Denislava Glushkova (Lithuania) Klaudija Bubelytė (Mexico) María Portillo Ramírez
January 22	Antalya, Turkey; Clay; W15; Singles and doubles draws	(Switzerland) Sebastianna Scilipoti (Republic of Ireland) Celine Simunyu; 6–3, 6–2	(Czech Republic) Linda Ševčíková (Turkey) Doğa Türkmen	(Slovenia) Pia Lovrič (Switzerland) Sebastianna Scilipoti	(Slovenia) Ela Nala Milić (Bulgaria) Denislava Glushkova (Lithuania) Klaudija Bubelytė (Mexico) María Portillo Ramírez
January 29	Burnie International; Burnie, Australia; Hard; W75; Singles – Doubles	(Australia) Priscilla Hon; 6–3, 6–0	(Japan) Sara Saito	(Japan) Aoi Ito (Japan) Ena Shibahara	(Japan) Sakura Hosogi (Japan) Yuki Naito (Australia) Maya Joint (Thailand) Mananchaya Sawangkaew
January 29	Burnie International; Burnie, Australia; Hard; W75; Singles – Doubles	(New Zealand) Paige Hourigan (New Zealand) Erin Routliffe; 7–6^{(7–5)}, 6–4	(Japan) Kyōka Okamura (Japan) Ayano Shimizu	(Japan) Aoi Ito (Japan) Ena Shibahara	(Japan) Sakura Hosogi (Japan) Yuki Naito (Australia) Maya Joint (Thailand) Mananchaya Sawangkaew
January 29	Open Andrézieux-Bouthéon 42; Andrézieux-Bouthéon, France; Hard (i); W75; Singles – Doubles	(United Kingdom) Lily Miyazaki; 3–6, 6–4, 6–1	(France) Jessika Ponchet	(France) Océane Dodin (Czech Republic) Tereza Martincová	(France) Elsa Jacquemot (United Kingdom) Emily Appleton (France) Alice Tubello (Sweden) Rebecca Peterson
January 29	Open Andrézieux-Bouthéon 42; Andrézieux-Bouthéon, France; Hard (i); W75; Singles – Doubles	Alevtina Ibragimova; Ekaterina Ovcharenko; 3–6, 6–3, [10–5]	(United Kingdom) Emily Appleton (United Kingdom) Freya Christie	(France) Océane Dodin (Czech Republic) Tereza Martincová	(France) Elsa Jacquemot (United Kingdom) Emily Appleton (France) Alice Tubello (Sweden) Rebecca Peterson
January 29	Georgia's Rome Tennis Open; Rome, United States; Hard (i); W75; Singles – Doubles	(United States) McCartney Kessler; 6–4, 6–1	(United States) Liv Hovde	(United States) Robin Anderson (United States) Hailey Baptiste	(Argentina) María Lourdes Carlé (Canada) Stacey Fung (United States) Robin Montgomery (United States) Victoria Hu
January 29	Georgia's Rome Tennis Open; Rome, United States; Hard (i); W75; Singles – Doubles	(United States) Angela Kulikov (United States) Jamie Loeb; Walkover	(United States) Hailey Baptiste (United States) Whitney Osuigwe	(United States) Robin Anderson (United States) Hailey Baptiste	(Argentina) María Lourdes Carlé (Canada) Stacey Fung (United States) Robin Montgomery (United States) Victoria Hu
January 29	Indore, India; Hard; W50; Singles and doubles draws	Polina Kudermetova; 3–6, 6–2, 6–0	(Slovenia) Dalila Jakupović	(France) Carole Monnet (Philippines) Alex Eala	(Japan) Saki Imamura (Serbia) Dejana Radanović (Romania) Anca Todoni (Japan) Eri Shimizu
January 29	Indore, India; Hard; W50; Singles and doubles draws	(United States) Jessie Aney (Germany) Lena Papadakis; 2–6, 6–0, [10–7]	(Japan) Saki Imamura (Japan) Mana Kawamura	(France) Carole Monnet (Philippines) Alex Eala	(Japan) Saki Imamura (Serbia) Dejana Radanović (Romania) Anca Todoni (Japan) Eri Shimizu
January 29	Porto Women's Indoor ITF; Porto, Portugal; Hard (i); W50; Singles and doubles draws	(Slovakia) Rebecca Šramková; 6–7^{(4–7)}, 7–5, 6–1	(Spain) Jéssica Bouzas Maneiro	Aliona Falei (Portugal) Francisca Jorge	(Italy) Anastasia Abbagnato (Croatia) Jana Fett (Czech Republic) Dominika Šalková (Slovenia) Polona Hercog
January 29	Porto Women's Indoor ITF; Porto, Portugal; Hard (i); W50; Singles and doubles draws	(Slovenia) Veronika Erjavec (Czech Republic) Dominika Šalková; 4–6, 7–5, [10–8]	(Portugal) Francisca Jorge (Portugal) Matilde Jorge	Aliona Falei (Portugal) Francisca Jorge	(Italy) Anastasia Abbagnato (Croatia) Jana Fett (Czech Republic) Dominika Šalková (Slovenia) Polona Hercog
January 29	Sharm El Sheikh, Egypt; Hard; W35; Singles and doubles draws	(Georgia (country)) Mariam Bolkvadze; 6–0, 6–3	Elena Pridankina	Kira Pavlova (Hong Kong) Cody Wong	Anastasia Gasanova (Spain) Guiomar Maristany (Spain) Leyre Romero Gormaz (Serbia) Lola Radivojević
January 29	Sharm El Sheikh, Egypt; Hard; W35; Singles and doubles draws	Daria Khomutsianskaya; Evialina Laskevich; 6–4, 6–2	(Czech Republic) Linda Klimovičová (Bulgaria) Isabella Shinikova	Kira Pavlova (Hong Kong) Cody Wong	Anastasia Gasanova (Spain) Guiomar Maristany (Spain) Leyre Romero Gormaz (Serbia) Lola Radivojević
January 29	Monastir, Tunisia; Hard; W15; Singles and doubles draws	(Italy) Arianna Zucchini; 7–5, 6–3	(South Korea) Lee Eun-hye	(Denmark) Rebecca Munk Mortensen (Czech Republic) Laura Samson	(Romania) Alexandra Iordache (Italy) Lara Pfeifer (Japan) Hiroko Kuwata (United States) Hina Inoue
January 29	Monastir, Tunisia; Hard; W15; Singles and doubles draws	(Germany) Laura Böhner (United Kingdom) Holly Hutchinson; 6–4, 7–6^{(7–4)}	(Netherlands) Rikke de Koning (Netherlands) Marente Sijbesma	(Denmark) Rebecca Munk Mortensen (Czech Republic) Laura Samson	(Romania) Alexandra Iordache (Italy) Lara Pfeifer (Japan) Hiroko Kuwata (United States) Hina Inoue
January 29	Antalya, Turkey; Clay; W15; Singles and doubles draws	(Hungary) Amarissa Kiara Tóth; 4–6, 6–2, 6–2	(Romania) Andreea Prisăcariu	Anastasia Zolotareva (Bulgaria) Rositsa Dencheva	(Czech Republic) Denisa Hindová (Italy) Anna Turati (Mexico) María Portillo Ramírez (Japan) Mayuka Aikawa
January 29	Antalya, Turkey; Clay; W15; Singles and doubles draws	(Japan) Mayuka Aikawa (Japan) Funa Kozaki; 7–5, 6–2	(Slovakia) Nikola Daubnerová (Slovakia) Anika Jašková	Anastasia Zolotareva (Bulgaria) Rositsa Dencheva	(Czech Republic) Denisa Hindová (Italy) Anna Turati (Mexico) María Portillo Ramírez (Japan) Mayuka Aikawa

=== February ===
Week of	Tournament	Winner	Runners-up	Semifinalists	Quarterfinalists
February 5	Guanajuato Open; Irapuato, Mexico; Hard; W100; Singles – Doubles	(Canada) Rebecca Marino; 6–1, 6–2	(Germany) Jule Niemeier	(United States) Whitney Osuigwe (United States) Sachia Vickery	(Argentina) María Lourdes Carlé (Canada) Carol Zhao; Marina Melnikova; Iryna Shymanovich
February 5	Guanajuato Open; Irapuato, Mexico; Hard; W100; Singles – Doubles	(United States) Hailey Baptiste (United States) Whitney Osuigwe; 7–5, 6–4	(United States) Ann Li (Canada) Rebecca Marino	(United States) Whitney Osuigwe (United States) Sachia Vickery	(Argentina) María Lourdes Carlé (Canada) Carol Zhao; Marina Melnikova; Iryna Shymanovich
February 5	Burnie International; Burnie, Australia; Hard; W75; Singles – Doubles	(Australia) Maya Joint; 1–6, 6–1, 7–5	(Japan) Aoi Ito	(Japan) Sara Saito (China) Wei Sijia	(Australia) Petra Hule (United Kingdom) Katie Swan (Australia) Kaylah McPhee (Japan) Haruka Kaji
February 5	Burnie International; Burnie, Australia; Hard; W75; Singles – Doubles	(China) Tang Qianhui (China) You Xiaodi; 6–4, 7–5	(China) Ma Yexin (Australia) Alana Parnaby	(Japan) Sara Saito (China) Wei Sijia	(Australia) Petra Hule (United Kingdom) Katie Swan (Australia) Kaylah McPhee (Japan) Haruka Kaji
February 5	Open de l'Isère; Grenoble, France; Hard (i); W75; Singles – Doubles	Aliona Falei; 6–1, 4–6, 6–4	(France) Manon Léonard	(France) Elsa Jacquemot; Ekaterina Maklakova	(France) Loïs Boisson (France) Harmony Tan (Poland) Maja Chwalińska (France) Margaux Rouvroy
February 5	Open de l'Isère; Grenoble, France; Hard (i); W75; Singles – Doubles	(United Kingdom) Emily Appleton (United Kingdom) Freya Christie; 3–6, 6–1, [11–9]	(United Kingdom) Sarah Beth Grey (United Kingdom) Eden Silva	(France) Elsa Jacquemot; Ekaterina Maklakova	(France) Loïs Boisson (France) Harmony Tan (Poland) Maja Chwalińska (France) Margaux Rouvroy
February 5	Edgbaston, United Kingdom; Hard (i); W50; Singles and doubles draws	(Belgium) Magali Kempen; 6–3, 7–6^{(8–6)}	(Czech Republic) Barbora Palicová	(United Kingdom) Katy Dunne (Georgia (country)) Mariam Bolkvadze	(Switzerland) Valentina Ryser (Croatia) Lea Bošković (Spain) Leyre Romero Gormaz (Croatia) Antonia Ružić
February 5	Edgbaston, United Kingdom; Hard (i); W50; Singles and doubles draws	(Belgium) Magali Kempen (Belgium) Lara Salden; 7–6^{(8–6)}, 6–2	(United Kingdom) Ali Collins (United Kingdom) Lily Miyazaki	(United Kingdom) Katy Dunne (Georgia (country)) Mariam Bolkvadze	(Switzerland) Valentina Ryser (Croatia) Lea Bošković (Spain) Leyre Romero Gormaz (Croatia) Antonia Ružić
February 5	Antalya, Turkey; Clay; W35; Singles and doubles draws	(Croatia) Tena Lukas; 2–6, 6–3, 6–1	(Slovenia) Polona Hercog	(Croatia) Tara Würth (Switzerland) Ylena In-Albon	(Bulgaria) Rositsa Dencheva (North Macedonia) Lina Gjorcheska (Bulgaria) Gergana Topalova (Bulgaria) Isabella Shinikova
February 5	Antalya, Turkey; Clay; W35; Singles and doubles draws	(Spain) Ángela Fita Boluda (Latvia) Daniela Vismane; 6–4, 6–0	(Romania) Cristina Dinu (Ukraine) Oleksandra Oliynykova	(Croatia) Tara Würth (Switzerland) Ylena In-Albon	(Bulgaria) Rositsa Dencheva (North Macedonia) Lina Gjorcheska (Bulgaria) Gergana Topalova (Bulgaria) Isabella Shinikova
February 5	Wesley Chapel, United States; Clay; W35; Singles and doubles draws	(Switzerland) Leonie Küng; 6–4, 3–6, 6–3	(United States) Sophie Chang	(United States) Madison Sieg (Bulgaria) Lia Karatancheva	(United States) Lea Ma (Serbia) Katarina Kozarov (Hungary) Panna Bartha (United States) Akasha Urhobo
February 5	Wesley Chapel, United States; Clay; W35; Singles and doubles draws	Maria Kononova; Maria Kozyreva; 7–5, 6–1	(Poland) Weronika Falkowska (Switzerland) Leonie Küng	(United States) Madison Sieg (Bulgaria) Lia Karatancheva	(United States) Lea Ma (Serbia) Katarina Kozarov (Hungary) Panna Bartha (United States) Akasha Urhobo
February 5	Sharm El Sheikh, Egypt; Hard; W15; Singles and doubles draws	(Romania) Elena-Teodora Cadar; 6–3, 6–4	(Slovakia) Katarína Kužmová	(Romania) Karola Bejenaru; Daria Khomutsianskaya	(Egypt) Yasmin Ezzat (Egypt) Sandra Samir (Finland) Laura Hietaranta (Hong Kong) Adithya Karunaratne
February 5	Sharm El Sheikh, Egypt; Hard; W15; Singles and doubles draws	(Romania) Karola Bejenaru; Ekaterina Shalimova; 6–4, 6–2	Daria Khomutsianskaya; Evialina Laskevich	(Romania) Karola Bejenaru; Daria Khomutsianskaya	(Egypt) Yasmin Ezzat (Egypt) Sandra Samir (Finland) Laura Hietaranta (Hong Kong) Adithya Karunaratne
February 5	Monastir, Tunisia; Hard; W15; Singles and doubles draws	(Czech Republic) Laura Samson; 6–1, 6–3	(Germany) Selina Dal	(United States) Hina Inoue (Japan) Hiroko Kuwata	(Slovakia) Salma Drugdová (Austria) Tamara Kostic (Italy) Arianna Zucchini (Germany) Caroline Werner
February 5	Monastir, Tunisia; Hard; W15; Singles and doubles draws	(Japan) Rina Saigo (Japan) Yukina Saigo; 6–3, 7–5	(Germany) Selina Dal (Netherlands) Stéphanie Judith Visscher	(United States) Hina Inoue (Japan) Hiroko Kuwata	(Slovakia) Salma Drugdová (Austria) Tamara Kostic (Italy) Arianna Zucchini (Germany) Caroline Werner
February 12	Burg-Wächter Ladies Open; Altenkirchen, Germany; Carpet (i); W75; Singles – Doubles	Julia Avdeeva; 6–4, 6–4	(Belgium) Alison Van Uytvanck	(France) Océane Dodin (Germany) Nastasja Schunk	(Belgium) Magali Kempen (Spain) Marina Bassols Ribera (Austria) Sinja Kraus (Liechtenstein) Kathinka von Deichmann
February 12	Burg-Wächter Ladies Open; Altenkirchen, Germany; Carpet (i); W75; Singles – Doubles	(Poland) Maja Chwalińska (Czech Republic) Jesika Malečková; 6–4, 7–5	(Germany) Julia Lohoff (Switzerland) Conny Perrin	(France) Océane Dodin (Germany) Nastasja Schunk	(Belgium) Magali Kempen (Spain) Marina Bassols Ribera (Austria) Sinja Kraus (Liechtenstein) Kathinka von Deichmann
February 12	Roehampton, United Kingdom; Hard (i); W50; Singles and doubles draws	(Switzerland) Lulu Sun; 7–5, 7–5	(United Kingdom) Heather Watson	(Czech Republic) Nikola Bartůňková (Croatia) Antonia Ružić	(United Kingdom) Mika Stojsavljevic (Croatia) Lea Bošković (Switzerland) Simona Waltert (Slovakia) Viktória Hrunčáková
February 12	Roehampton, United Kingdom; Hard (i); W50; Singles and doubles draws	(United Kingdom) Freya Christie (United Kingdom) Samantha Murray Sharan; 7–6^{(7–5)}, 6–3	(United Kingdom) Ali Collins (Estonia) Elena Malõgina	(Czech Republic) Nikola Bartůňková (Croatia) Antonia Ružić	(United Kingdom) Mika Stojsavljevic (Croatia) Lea Bošković (Switzerland) Simona Waltert (Slovakia) Viktória Hrunčáková
February 12	Morelia, Mexico; Hard; W50; Singles and doubles draws	(Spain) Jéssica Bouzas Maneiro; 6–7^{(11–13)}, 6–1, 7–6^{(7–1)}	(United States) Hailey Baptiste	(Canada) Rebecca Marino (Germany) Jule Niemeier	(Serbia) Natalija Stevanović (Argentina) Solana Sierra (Mexico) Fernanda Contreras (Spain) Irene Burillo Escorihuela
February 12	Morelia, Mexico; Hard; W50; Singles and doubles draws	Marina Melnikova (Netherlands) Lesley Pattinama Kerkhove; 6–4, 4–6, [11–9]	(Spain) Irene Burillo Escorihuela (United States) Rasheeda McAdoo	(Canada) Rebecca Marino (Germany) Jule Niemeier	(Serbia) Natalija Stevanović (Argentina) Solana Sierra (Mexico) Fernanda Contreras (Spain) Irene Burillo Escorihuela
February 12	Nakhon Si Thammarat, Thailand; Hard; W35; Singles and doubles draws	(Thailand) Peangtarn Plipuech; 2–6, 6–3, 6–2	(Romania) Irina Fetecău	(Germany) Antonia Schmidt (China) Liu Fangzhou	(Japan) Naho Sato (Japan) Eri Shimizu (China) Yang Yidi (China) Yao Xinxin
February 12	Nakhon Si Thammarat, Thailand; Hard; W35; Singles and doubles draws	(Thailand) Peangtarn Plipuech (Japan) Naho Sato; 6–1, 4–6, [10–7]	(China) Feng Shuo (China) Zheng Wushuang	(Germany) Antonia Schmidt (China) Liu Fangzhou	(Japan) Naho Sato (Japan) Eri Shimizu (China) Yang Yidi (China) Yao Xinxin
February 12	Hammamet, Tunisia; Clay; W35; Singles and doubles draws	(Croatia) Lucija Ćirić Bagarić; 6–2, 7–5	(Belgium) Marie Benoît	(Italy) Dalila Spiteri (United Kingdom) Francesca Jones	(Spain) Andrea Lázaro García (France) Emma Léné (France) Alice Tubello (Romania) Ilinca Amariei
February 12	Hammamet, Tunisia; Clay; W35; Singles and doubles draws	(Romania) Oana Gavrilă (Greece) Sapfo Sakellaridi; 6–7^{(5–7)}, 7–5, [10–4]	Amina Anshba (Germany) Katharina Hobgarski	(Italy) Dalila Spiteri (United Kingdom) Francesca Jones	(Spain) Andrea Lázaro García (France) Emma Léné (France) Alice Tubello (Romania) Ilinca Amariei
February 12	Antalya, Turkey; Clay; W35; Singles and doubles draws	(Romania) Cristina Dinu; 6–3, 3–0 ret.	(Canada) Carson Branstine	(France) Séléna Janicijevic (Italy) Nuria Brancaccio	(Spain) Ángela Fita Boluda (Australia) Seone Mendez; Alexandra Shubladze (Slovenia) Polona Hercog
February 12	Antalya, Turkey; Clay; W35; Singles and doubles draws	(Italy) Martina Colmegna (France) Alice Ramé; 3–6, 6–1, [13–11]	(Spain) Ángela Fita Boluda (Latvia) Daniela Vismane	(France) Séléna Janicijevic (Italy) Nuria Brancaccio	(Spain) Ángela Fita Boluda (Australia) Seone Mendez; Alexandra Shubladze (Slovenia) Polona Hercog
February 12	Sharm El Sheikh, Egypt; Hard; W15; Singles and doubles draws	(Slovakia) Katarína Kužmová; 6–3, 6–1	(Hong Kong) Adithya Karunaratne	(South Korea) Jeong Bo-young (Egypt) Sandra Samir	Ksenia Laskutova (Netherlands) Michaëlla Krajicek; Daria Khomutsianskaya (France) Margot Phanthala
February 12	Sharm El Sheikh, Egypt; Hard; W15; Singles and doubles draws	(South Korea) Jeong Bo-young (Netherlands) Sarah van Emst; 6–2, 6–1	Evgeniya Burdina (Egypt) Yasmin Ezzat	(South Korea) Jeong Bo-young (Egypt) Sandra Samir	Ksenia Laskutova (Netherlands) Michaëlla Krajicek; Daria Khomutsianskaya (France) Margot Phanthala
February 12	Manacor, Spain; Hard; W15; Singles and doubles draws	(Denmark) Rebecca Munk Mortensen; 6–4, 4–6, 7–6^{(7–5)}	(Hungary) Natália Szabanin	(France) Julie Belgraver (Sweden) Caijsa Hennemann	(Switzerland) Jenny Dürst (Spain) Lorena Solar Donoso (Sweden) Isabel Skoog (Czech Republic) Denisa Hindová
February 12	Manacor, Spain; Hard; W15; Singles and doubles draws	(Canada) Louise Kwong (United States) Anna Ulyashchenko; 6–1, 6–4	(Lithuania) Patricija Paukštytė (France) Laïa Petretic	(France) Julie Belgraver (Sweden) Caijsa Hennemann	(Switzerland) Jenny Dürst (Spain) Lorena Solar Donoso (Sweden) Isabel Skoog (Czech Republic) Denisa Hindová
February 12	Monastir, Tunisia; Hard; W15; Singles and doubles draws	(Czech Republic) Tereza Valentová; 6–3, 6–2	(China) Ren Yufei	(Japan) Rina Saigo (Slovakia) Radka Zelníčková	(United States) Brandy Walker (Germany) Selina Dal (Netherlands) Stéphanie Judith Visscher (United States) Hina Inoue
February 12	Monastir, Tunisia; Hard; W15; Singles and doubles draws	(Czech Republic) Tereza Valentová (Slovakia) Radka Zelníčková; 6–4, 6–2	(Italy) Angelica Raggi (Bulgaria) Ani Vangelova	(Japan) Rina Saigo (Slovakia) Radka Zelníčková	(United States) Brandy Walker (Germany) Selina Dal (Netherlands) Stéphanie Judith Visscher (United States) Hina Inoue
February 19	Porto Women's Indoor ITF; Porto, Portugal; Hard (i); W75; Singles – Doubles	(Hungary) Anna Bondár; 7–6^{(7–4)}, 6–2	(Germany) Noma Noha Akugue	(Netherlands) Suzan Lamens (Switzerland) Céline Naef	(Spain) Marina Bassols Ribera (Spain) Leyre Romero Gormaz (Germany) Anna-Lena Friedsam (Philippines) Alex Eala
February 19	Porto Women's Indoor ITF; Porto, Portugal; Hard (i); W75; Singles – Doubles	(Hungary) Anna Bondár (Switzerland) Céline Naef; 6–4, 3–6, [11–9]	(Portugal) Francisca Jorge (Portugal) Matilde Jorge	(Netherlands) Suzan Lamens (Switzerland) Céline Naef	(Spain) Marina Bassols Ribera (Spain) Leyre Romero Gormaz (Germany) Anna-Lena Friedsam (Philippines) Alex Eala
February 19	Mexico City, Mexico; Hard; W50; Singles and doubles draws	(United States) Jamie Loeb; 6–2, 6–2	(United States) Dalayna Hewitt	(Mexico) Victoria Rodríguez (United States) Victoria Hu	(Canada) Stacey Fung (Czech Republic) Michaela Bayerlová (Spain) Irene Burillo Escorihuela (United States) Whitney Osuigwe
February 19	Mexico City, Mexico; Hard; W50; Singles and doubles draws	(United States) Jessie Aney (United States) Jessica Failla; 3–6, 6–4, [10–8]	(Brazil) Thaísa Pedretti (Mexico) María Portillo Ramírez	(Mexico) Victoria Rodríguez (United States) Victoria Hu	(Canada) Stacey Fung (Czech Republic) Michaela Bayerlová (Spain) Irene Burillo Escorihuela (United States) Whitney Osuigwe
February 19	Wiphold International; Pretoria, South Africa; Hard; W50; Singles and doubles draws	(Israel) Lina Glushko; 6–3, 7–5	(France) Manon Léonard	(Brazil) Laura Pigossi (Spain) Guiomar Maristany	(South Africa) Isabella Kruger (Australia) Kaylah McPhee (Bulgaria) Isabella Shinikova (Czech Republic) Gabriela Knutson
February 19	Wiphold International; Pretoria, South Africa; Hard; W50; Singles and doubles draws	(Israel) Lina Glushko (Czech Republic) Gabriela Knutson; 7–6^{(7–5)}, 7–6^{(7–4)}	(Belgium) Sofia Costoulas (Belgium) Hanne Vandewinkel	(Brazil) Laura Pigossi (Spain) Guiomar Maristany	(South Africa) Isabella Kruger (Australia) Kaylah McPhee (Bulgaria) Isabella Shinikova (Czech Republic) Gabriela Knutson
February 19	Traralgon International; Traralgon, Australia; Hard; W35; Singles and doubles draws	(United Kingdom) Amarni Banks; 6–3, 6–3	(Japan) Naho Sato	(Australia) Priscilla Hon (Thailand) Lanlana Tararudee	(China) Lu Jiajing (Japan) Sayaka Ishii (China) Ma Yexin (Australia) Destanee Aiava
February 19	Traralgon International; Traralgon, Australia; Hard; W35; Singles and doubles draws	(Japan) Mana Kawamura (China) Liu Fangzhou; 6–7^{(4–7)}, 6–3, [13–11]	(Japan) Sayaka Ishii (Thailand) Lanlana Tararudee	(Australia) Priscilla Hon (Thailand) Lanlana Tararudee	(China) Lu Jiajing (Japan) Sayaka Ishii (China) Ma Yexin (Australia) Destanee Aiava
February 19	Hammamet, Tunisia; Clay; W35; Singles and doubles draws	(Croatia) Lucija Ćirić Bagarić; 2–1 ret.	(United Kingdom) Francesca Jones	(Belgium) Marie Benoît (France) Alice Tubello	(Spain) Carlota Martínez Círez (Spain) Andrea Lázaro García (Romania) Ilinca Amariei (Italy) Camilla Gennaro
February 19	Hammamet, Tunisia; Clay; W35; Singles and doubles draws	(Romania) Oana Gavrilă (Greece) Sapfo Sakellaridi; 6–1, 6–3	(France) Emma Léné (France) Astrid Lew Yan Foon	(Belgium) Marie Benoît (France) Alice Tubello	(Spain) Carlota Martínez Círez (Spain) Andrea Lázaro García (Romania) Ilinca Amariei (Italy) Camilla Gennaro
February 19	Antalya, Turkey; Clay; W35; Singles and doubles draws	(Spain) Ángela Fita Boluda; 6–0, 6–2	(Italy) Martina Colmegna	(Latvia) Daniela Vismane (France) Alice Ramé	(Slovakia) Nina Vargová (Australia) Seone Mendez (Hungary) Amarissa Kiara Tóth; Alexandra Shubladze
February 19	Antalya, Turkey; Clay; W35; Singles and doubles draws	(Spain) Ángela Fita Boluda (Latvia) Daniela Vismane; 6–1, 6–3	(Greece) Martha Matoula (Greece) Dimitra Pavlou	(Latvia) Daniela Vismane (France) Alice Ramé	(Slovakia) Nina Vargová (Australia) Seone Mendez (Hungary) Amarissa Kiara Tóth; Alexandra Shubladze
February 19	Sharm El Sheikh, Egypt; Hard; W15; Singles and doubles draws	(Slovakia) Katarína Kužmová; 4–6, 7–5, 6–4	(Egypt) Sandra Samir	(France) Flavie Brugnone (Netherlands) Sarah van Emst	(Italy) Carola Cavelli; Alisa Kummel (Netherlands) Annelin Bakker (Slovakia) Irina Balus
February 19	Sharm El Sheikh, Egypt; Hard; W15; Singles and doubles draws	(Netherlands) Annelin Bakker (Netherlands) Sarah van Emst; 6–1, 6–0	(Romania) Elena-Teodora Cadar (Austria) Melanie Klaffner	(France) Flavie Brugnone (Netherlands) Sarah van Emst	(Italy) Carola Cavelli; Alisa Kummel (Netherlands) Annelin Bakker (Slovakia) Irina Balus
February 19	Manacor, Spain; Hard; W15; Singles and doubles draws	(Sweden) Caijsa Hennemann; 7–5, 6–2	(Luxembourg) Marie Weckerle	(Denmark) Rebecca Munk Mortensen (France) Julie Belgraver	(France) Yaroslava Bartashevich (Czech Republic) Ivana Šebestová (Poland) Anna Hertel (Switzerland) Fiona Ganz
February 19	Manacor, Spain; Hard; W15; Singles and doubles draws	(Spain) Martina Genis Salas (Spain) Ruth Roura Llaverias; 6–3, 2–6, [10–6]	(Netherlands) Rikke de Koning (Netherlands) Marente Sijbesma	(Denmark) Rebecca Munk Mortensen (France) Julie Belgraver	(France) Yaroslava Bartashevich (Czech Republic) Ivana Šebestová (Poland) Anna Hertel (Switzerland) Fiona Ganz
February 19	Nakhon Si Thammarat, Thailand; Hard; W15; Singles and doubles draws	(Japan) Saki Imamura; 7–6^{(9–7)}, 7–5	(China) Yao Xinxin	(Hong Kong) Cody Wong (Belgium) Clara Vlasselaer	(Germany) Antonia Schmidt (Thailand) Patcharin Cheapchandej (Kazakhstan) Zhibek Kulambayeva (China) Zheng Wushuang
February 19	Nakhon Si Thammarat, Thailand; Hard; W15; Singles and doubles draws	(China) Guo Meiqi (China) Xiao Zhenghua; 6–3, 6–4	(China) Yao Xinxin (China) Zheng Wushuang	(Hong Kong) Cody Wong (Belgium) Clara Vlasselaer	(Germany) Antonia Schmidt (Thailand) Patcharin Cheapchandej (Kazakhstan) Zhibek Kulambayeva (China) Zheng Wushuang
February 19	Monastir, Tunisia; Hard; W15; Singles and doubles draws	(Czech Republic) Tereza Valentová; 6–2, 6–1	(France) Audrey Albié	(France) Manon Arcangioli (Switzerland) Tess Sugnaux	(United Kingdom) Talia Neilson Gatenby (China) Shi Han (Slovakia) Radka Zelníčková (Switzerland) Alina Granwehr
February 19	Monastir, Tunisia; Hard; W15; Singles and doubles draws	(Switzerland) Naïma Karamoko (Switzerland) Tess Sugnaux; 5–7, 6–2, [10–7]	(Switzerland) Alina Granwehr (Switzerland) Karolina Kozakova	(France) Manon Arcangioli (Switzerland) Tess Sugnaux	(United Kingdom) Talia Neilson Gatenby (China) Shi Han (Slovakia) Radka Zelníčková (Switzerland) Alina Granwehr
February 26	Open Mâcon; Mâcon, France; Hard (i); W50; Singles and doubles draws	(France) Harmony Tan; 6–2, 6–0	(France) Audrey Albié	(Cyprus) Raluca Șerban; Anastasia Tikhonova	Alevtina Ibragimova (France) Margaux Rouvroy (France) Loïs Boisson (France) Amandine Monnot
February 26	Open Mâcon; Mâcon, France; Hard (i); W50; Singles and doubles draws	(Italy) Silvia Ambrosio (Germany) Lena Papadakis; 5–7, 7–5, [10–7]	(United Kingdom) Madeleine Brooks (Netherlands) Isabelle Haverlag	(Cyprus) Raluca Șerban; Anastasia Tikhonova	Alevtina Ibragimova (France) Margaux Rouvroy (France) Loïs Boisson (France) Amandine Monnot
February 26	Empire Women's Indoor; Trnava, Slovakia; Hard (i); W50; Singles and doubles draws	Anastasiia Gureva; 3–6, 6–3, 6–4	Elena Pridankina	(Chinese Taipei) Liang En-shuo (Czech Republic) Nikola Bartůňková	(Hungary) Panna Udvardy (Japan) Moyuka Uchijima (Turkey) Zeynep Sönmez (Philippines) Alex Eala
February 26	Empire Women's Indoor; Trnava, Slovakia; Hard (i); W50; Singles and doubles draws	(Switzerland) Lulu Sun (Japan) Moyuka Uchijima; 6–4, 7–6^{(7–3)}	(Poland) Weronika Falkowska (Hungary) Fanny Stollár	(Chinese Taipei) Liang En-shuo (Czech Republic) Nikola Bartůňková	(Hungary) Panna Udvardy (Japan) Moyuka Uchijima (Turkey) Zeynep Sönmez (Philippines) Alex Eala
February 26	Wiphold International; Pretoria, South Africa; Hard; W50; Singles and doubles draws	(Brazil) Laura Pigossi; 6–2, 4–6, 7–5	(Belgium) Hanne Vandewinkel	(France) Manon Léonard (Czech Republic) Gabriela Knutson	(United States) Jaeda Daniel; Alina Charaeva (United States) Clervie Ngounoue; Polina Iatcenko
February 26	Wiphold International; Pretoria, South Africa; Hard; W50; Singles and doubles draws	Alina Charaeva; Ekaterina Reyngold; 6–0, 5–7, [10–3]	(South Africa) Isabella Kruger (South Africa) Zoë Kruger	(France) Manon Léonard (Czech Republic) Gabriela Knutson	(United States) Jaeda Daniel; Alina Charaeva (United States) Clervie Ngounoue; Polina Iatcenko
February 26	Traralgon International; Traralgon, Australia; Hard; W35; Singles and doubles draws	(Thailand) Lanlana Tararudee; 6–4, 7–5	(China) Ma Yexin	(Australia) Priscilla Hon (Australia) Petra Hule	(United Kingdom) Amarni Banks (Australia) Lizette Cabrera (Japan) Miho Kuramochi (Australia) Destanee Aiava
February 26	Traralgon International; Traralgon, Australia; Hard; W35; Singles and doubles draws	(Japan) Yuki Naito (Japan) Naho Sato; 6–1, 6–3	(Australia) Destanee Aiava (Australia) Tenika McGiffin	(Australia) Priscilla Hon (Australia) Petra Hule	(United Kingdom) Amarni Banks (Australia) Lizette Cabrera (Japan) Miho Kuramochi (Australia) Destanee Aiava
February 26	Helsinki, Finland; Hard (i); W35; Singles and doubles draws	(Norway) Malene Helgø; 6–3, 6–2	(Serbia) Dejana Radanović	(Sweden) Caijsa Hennemann (Croatia) Lea Bošković	(Czech Republic) Linda Klimovičová (Australia) Talia Gibson (France) Kristina Mladenovic (United States) Robin Anderson
February 26	Helsinki, Finland; Hard (i); W35; Singles and doubles draws	(Finland) Laura Hietaranta (Czech Republic) Linda Klimovičová; 6–3, 6–1	(Greece) Valentini Grammatikopoulou (Poland) Martyna Kubka	(Sweden) Caijsa Hennemann (Croatia) Lea Bošković	(Czech Republic) Linda Klimovičová (Australia) Talia Gibson (France) Kristina Mladenovic (United States) Robin Anderson
February 26	Gurgaon, India; Hard; W35; Singles and doubles draws	(Lithuania) Justina Mikulskytė; 6–0, 6–1	(South Korea) Ku Yeon-woo	(Slovenia) Dalila Jakupović (India) Ankita Raina	(India) Sahaja Yamalapalli; Ekaterina Kazionova (Kazakhstan) Zhibek Kulambayeva (Sweden) Jacqueline Cabaj Awad
February 26	Gurgaon, India; Hard; W35; Singles and doubles draws	(Kazakhstan) Zhibek Kulambayeva (India) Ankita Raina; 6–4, 6–2	(Sweden) Jacqueline Cabaj Awad (Lithuania) Justina Mikulskytė	(Slovenia) Dalila Jakupović (India) Ankita Raina	(India) Sahaja Yamalapalli; Ekaterina Kazionova (Kazakhstan) Zhibek Kulambayeva (Sweden) Jacqueline Cabaj Awad
February 26	Spring, United States; Hard; W35; Singles and doubles draws	(Japan) Ena Shibahara; 6–2, 4–6, 6–3	(United States) Iva Jovic	(United States) Maria Mateas (United States) Varvara Lepchenko	(United States) Whitney Osuigwe; Maria Kononova (United States) Malkia Ngounoue (United States) Allura Zamarripa
February 26	Spring, United States; Hard; W35; Singles and doubles draws	(United States) Whitney Osuigwe (United States) Alana Smith; 6–4, 6–4	(United States) Malkia Ngounoue (Brazil) Thaísa Pedretti	(United States) Maria Mateas (United States) Varvara Lepchenko	(United States) Whitney Osuigwe; Maria Kononova (United States) Malkia Ngounoue (United States) Allura Zamarripa
February 26	San Miguel de Tucumán, Argentina; Clay; W15; Singles and doubles draws	(Paraguay) Ana Paula Neffa de los Ríos vs (Italy) Verena Meliss; Final was not played due to poor weather		(Brazil) Letícia Garcia Vidal; Alexandra Vasilyeva	(Argentina) Josefina Estévez (Chile) Fernanda Labraña (Italy) Camilla Zanolini (Brazil) Júlia Konishi Camargo Silva
February 26	San Miguel de Tucumán, Argentina; Clay; W15; Singles and doubles draws	(Argentina) Justina González Daniele (Ecuador) Camila Romero; 4–6, 7–6^{(8–6)}, [10–8]	(Brazil) Ana Candiotto (Bolivia) Noelia Zeballos	(Brazil) Letícia Garcia Vidal; Alexandra Vasilyeva	(Argentina) Josefina Estévez (Chile) Fernanda Labraña (Italy) Camilla Zanolini (Brazil) Júlia Konishi Camargo Silva
February 26	Sharm El Sheikh, Egypt; Hard; W15; Singles and doubles draws	(Egypt) Sandra Samir; 6–0, 6–4	(Czech Republic) Laura Samson	(Switzerland) Arlinda Rushiti (Egypt) Merna Refaat	(Slovakia) Irina Balus; Alisa Kummel; Evgeniya Burdina (Egypt) Lamis Alhussein Abdel Aziz
February 26	Sharm El Sheikh, Egypt; Hard; W15; Singles and doubles draws	(Romania) Karola Bejenaru (Lithuania) Andrė Lukošiūtė; 6–4, 6–3	(Japan) Mana Ayukawa (Romania) Briana Szabó	(Switzerland) Arlinda Rushiti (Egypt) Merna Refaat	(Slovakia) Irina Balus; Alisa Kummel; Evgeniya Burdina (Egypt) Lamis Alhussein Abdel Aziz
February 26	Ipoh, Malaysia; Hard; W15; Singles and doubles draws	(Hong Kong) Wu Ho-ching; 6–2, 6–3	(Japan) Lisa-Marie Rioux	(Japan) Nana Kawagishi (Japan) Hayu Kinoshita	(Japan) Yui Chikaraishi (China) Zhao Xichen (Japan) Riko Kikawada (China) Guo Meiqi
February 26	Ipoh, Malaysia; Hard; W15; Singles and doubles draws	(Chinese Taipei) Cho I-hsuan (Chinese Taipei) Cho Yi-tsen; 6–4, 6–2	(China) Guo Meiqi (China) Zhenghua Xiao	(Japan) Nana Kawagishi (Japan) Hayu Kinoshita	(Japan) Yui Chikaraishi (China) Zhao Xichen (Japan) Riko Kikawada (China) Guo Meiqi
February 26	Manacor, Spain; Hard; W15; Singles and doubles draws	(Spain) Kaitlin Quevedo; 6–2, 3–1 ret.	(Hungary) Natália Szabanin	(Spain) Noelia Bouzó Zanotti (Switzerland) Fiona Ganz	(Switzerland) Jenny Dürst (Luxembourg) Marie Weckerle (Serbia) Mihaela Đaković (Portugal) Angelina Voloshchuk
February 26	Manacor, Spain; Hard; W15; Singles and doubles draws	(Germany) Alicia Melosch (United States) Julia Ronney; 6–3, 6–4	(Montenegro) Tea Nikčević (Spain) Kaitlin Quevedo	(Spain) Noelia Bouzó Zanotti (Switzerland) Fiona Ganz	(Switzerland) Jenny Dürst (Luxembourg) Marie Weckerle (Serbia) Mihaela Đaković (Portugal) Angelina Voloshchuk
February 26	Nakhon Si Thammarat, Thailand; Hard; W15; Singles and doubles draws	(Japan) Saki Imamura; 6–2, 6–7^{(4–7)}, 6–2	(China) Yuan Chengyiyi	(China) Zheng Wushuang (China) Xun Fangying	(Chinese Taipei) Lin Fang-an (Thailand) Watsachol Sawatdee (Thailand) Patcharin Cheapchandej (Japan) Nagi Hanatani
February 26	Nakhon Si Thammarat, Thailand; Hard; W15; Singles and doubles draws	(Chinese Taipei) Lee Ya-hsin (Hong Kong) Cody Wong; 6–3, 7–5	(China) Yao Xinxin (China) Zheng Wushuang	(China) Zheng Wushuang (China) Xun Fangying	(Chinese Taipei) Lin Fang-an (Thailand) Watsachol Sawatdee (Thailand) Patcharin Cheapchandej (Japan) Nagi Hanatani
February 26	Monastir, Tunisia; Hard; W15; Singles and doubles draws	(Switzerland) Karolina Kozakova; 6–4, 6–1	(Belgium) Eliessa Vanlangendonck	(Greece) Sapfo Sakellaridi (Italy) Virginia Ferrara	(France) Pauline Payet (Italy) Arianna Zucchini (Germany) Johanna Silva (China) Shi Han
February 26	Monastir, Tunisia; Hard; W15; Singles and doubles draws	(Germany) Mara Guth (Greece) Sapfo Sakellaridi; 7–5, 6–1	(Germany) Luisa Hrda (Germany) Yasmine Wagner	(Greece) Sapfo Sakellaridi (Italy) Virginia Ferrara	(France) Pauline Payet (Italy) Arianna Zucchini (Germany) Johanna Silva (China) Shi Han
February 26	Antalya, Turkey; Clay; W15; Singles and doubles draws	(Latvia) Daniela Vismane; 0–1 ret.	(Hungary) Amarissa Kiara Tóth	Alexandra Shubladze (France) Alice Ramé	(Ukraine) Oleksandra Oliynykova (Germany) Joëlle Steur (Serbia) Anja Stanković; Oksana Selekhmeteva
February 26	Antalya, Turkey; Clay; W15; Singles and doubles draws	(Serbia) Anja Stanković (Turkey) İlay Yörük; 6–3, 3–6, [10–4]	(Italy) Alessandra Mazzola (Serbia) Natalija Senić	Alexandra Shubladze (France) Alice Ramé	(Ukraine) Oleksandra Oliynykova (Germany) Joëlle Steur (Serbia) Anja Stanković; Oksana Selekhmeteva

=== March ===
Week of	Tournament	Winner	Runners-up	Semifinalists	Quarterfinalists
March 4	Empire Women's Indoor; Trnava, Slovakia; Hard (i); W75; Singles – Doubles	(Netherlands) Suzan Lamens; 6–2, 6–2	(Switzerland) Céline Naef	Anastasia Tikhonova (Croatia) Jana Fett	(United Kingdom) Lily Miyazaki (Turkey) Zeynep Sönmez (Japan) Himeno Sakatsume (Romania) Elena-Gabriela Ruse
March 4	Empire Women's Indoor; Trnava, Slovakia; Hard (i); W75; Singles – Doubles	(Netherlands) Isabelle Haverlag (United States) Anna Rogers; 6–3, 4–6, [12–10]	(Chinese Taipei) Liang En-shuo (China) Tang Qianhui	Anastasia Tikhonova (Croatia) Jana Fett	(United Kingdom) Lily Miyazaki (Turkey) Zeynep Sönmez (Japan) Himeno Sakatsume (Romania) Elena-Gabriela Ruse
March 4	Santo Domingo, Dominican Republic; Hard; W35; Singles and doubles draws	(China) Gao Xinyu; 6–3, 6–2	(Mexico) Victoria Rodríguez	(United States) Elvina Kalieva (Spain) Leyre Romero Gormaz	(Andorra) Victoria Jiménez Kasintseva (Belgium) Sofia Costoulas (United States) Lea Ma (Australia) Maya Joint
March 4	Santo Domingo, Dominican Republic; Hard; W35; Singles and doubles draws	(United States) Carmen Corley (United States) Ivana Corley; 6–2, 6–7^{(3–7)}, [10–5]	(Spain) Leyre Romero Gormaz (Italy) Camilla Rosatello	(United States) Elvina Kalieva (Spain) Leyre Romero Gormaz	(Andorra) Victoria Jiménez Kasintseva (Belgium) Sofia Costoulas (United States) Lea Ma (Australia) Maya Joint
March 4	Nagpur, India; Clay; W35; Singles and doubles draws	(Slovenia) Dalila Jakupović; 6–1, 6–2	(South Korea) Ku Yeon-woo	Daria Kudashova (South Korea) Back Da-yeon	Ekaterina Yashina (Japan) Rinon Okuwaki (India) Sahaja Yamalapalli (Italy) Miriana Tona
March 4	Nagpur, India; Clay; W35; Singles and doubles draws	(Romania) Irina Bara (Slovenia) Dalila Jakupović; 6–7^{(8–10)}, 7–6^{(7–5)}, [10–7]	(South Korea) Ku Yeon-woo (Lithuania) Justina Mikulskytė	Daria Kudashova (South Korea) Back Da-yeon	Ekaterina Yashina (Japan) Rinon Okuwaki (India) Sahaja Yamalapalli (Italy) Miriana Tona
March 4	Solarino, Italy; Carpet; W35; Singles and doubles draws	(Czech Republic) Linda Klimovičová; 6–3, 6–0	(Italy) Jessica Pieri	(France) Aravane Rezaï (Czech Republic) Barbora Palicová	(Belgium) Magali Kempen (Japan) Haruka Kaji (Italy) Giorgia Pedone (Netherlands) Lesley Pattinama Kerkhove
March 4	Solarino, Italy; Carpet; W35; Singles and doubles draws	(Poland) Martyna Kubka (Chinese Taipei) Tsao Chia-yi; 6–4, 6–2	(Serbia) Katarina Kozarov; Veronika Miroshnichenko	(France) Aravane Rezaï (Czech Republic) Barbora Palicová	(Belgium) Magali Kempen (Japan) Haruka Kaji (Italy) Giorgia Pedone (Netherlands) Lesley Pattinama Kerkhove
March 4	Córdoba, Argentina; Clay; W15; Singles and doubles draws	(Argentina) Jazmín Ortenzi; 6–2, 6–0	(Argentina) Julieta Lara Estable	(Bolivia) Noelia Zeballos (Italy) Nicole Fossa Huergo	(Argentina) Luisina Giovannini (Italy) Camilla Zanolini (Spain) Alicia Herrero Liñana (Argentina) Melany Krywoj
March 4	Córdoba, Argentina; Clay; W15; Singles and doubles draws	(Spain) Alicia Herrero Liñana (Argentina) Melany Krywoj; 6–2, 5–7, [10–5]	(Ecuador) Camila Romero (Argentina) Candela Vázquez	(Bolivia) Noelia Zeballos (Italy) Nicole Fossa Huergo	(Argentina) Luisina Giovannini (Italy) Camilla Zanolini (Spain) Alicia Herrero Liñana (Argentina) Melany Krywoj
March 4	Brossard, Canada; Hard (i); W15; Singles and doubles draws	(United States) Catherine Harrison; 4–6, 6–1, 6–3	(United States) Jessie Aney	(United States) Anna Frey (Canada) Clémence Mercier	(France) Alice Robbe (United Kingdom) Bronte Murgett (Canada) Jada Bui (United States) Carolyn Campana
March 4	Brossard, Canada; Hard (i); W15; Singles and doubles draws	(United States) Ashton Bowers (Poland) Zuzanna Pawlikowska; 6–3, 6–3	(United States) Jessica Bernales (United States) Mia Yamakita	(United States) Anna Frey (Canada) Clémence Mercier	(France) Alice Robbe (United Kingdom) Bronte Murgett (Canada) Jada Bui (United States) Carolyn Campana
March 4	Sharm El Sheikh, Egypt; Hard; W15; Singles and doubles draws	(Czech Republic) Anna Sisková; 6–4, 4–6, 6–2	(Slovakia) Katarína Kužmová	(Luxembourg) Marie Weckerle (Egypt) Sandra Samir	(Cyprus) Daria Frayman (Switzerland) Jenny Dürst (Netherlands) Anouck Vrancken Peeters (Egypt) Lamis Alhussein Abdel Aziz
March 4	Sharm El Sheikh, Egypt; Hard; W15; Singles and doubles draws	(South Korea) Jeong Bo-young (Lithuania) Andrė Lukošiūtė; 6–2, 6–0	(Poland) Daria Kuczer (Estonia) Liisa Varul	(Luxembourg) Marie Weckerle (Egypt) Sandra Samir	(Cyprus) Daria Frayman (Switzerland) Jenny Dürst (Netherlands) Anouck Vrancken Peeters (Egypt) Lamis Alhussein Abdel Aziz
March 4	Heraklion, Greece; Clay; W15; Singles and doubles draws	Ksenia Zaytseva; 6–2, 7–5	(Lithuania) Klaudija Bubelytė	(Bulgaria) Rositsa Dencheva (France) Lucie Nguyen Tan	(Greece) Sapfo Sakellaridi (United Kingdom) Sarah Tatu (Germany) Marie Vogt (Poland) Marcelina Podlińska
March 4	Heraklion, Greece; Clay; W15; Singles and doubles draws	(Greece) Eleni Christofi (Greece) Sapfo Sakellaridi; 6–3, 6–3	(France) Lucie Nguyen Tan; Ksenia Zaytseva	(Bulgaria) Rositsa Dencheva (France) Lucie Nguyen Tan	(Greece) Sapfo Sakellaridi (United Kingdom) Sarah Tatu (Germany) Marie Vogt (Poland) Marcelina Podlińska
March 4	Karaganda, Kazakhstan; Hard (i); W15; Singles and doubles draws	(France) Yaroslava Bartashevich; 6–4, 6–3	Ksenia Laskutova	(Estonia) Elena Malõgina (South Korea) Lee Eun-hye	(Ukraine) Anastasiia Poplavska; Arina Arifullina; Daria Zelinskaya (Kazakhstan) Zhibek Kulambayeva
March 4	Karaganda, Kazakhstan; Hard (i); W15; Singles and doubles draws	Victoria Mikhaylova (Ukraine) Anastasiia Poplavska; 6–2, 3–6, [10–5]	(Kyrgyzstan) Vladislava Andreevskaya; Ksenia Laskutova	(Estonia) Elena Malõgina (South Korea) Lee Eun-hye	(Ukraine) Anastasiia Poplavska; Arina Arifullina; Daria Zelinskaya (Kazakhstan) Zhibek Kulambayeva
March 4	Kuala Lumpur, Malaysia; Hard; W15; Singles and doubles draws	(Japan) Naho Sato; 6–4, 6–3	(China) Yuan Chengyiyi	(China) Xun Fangying (Chinese Taipei) Cho I-hsuan	(South Korea) Jang Ga-eul (Japan) Kanako Morisaki (Hong Kong) Wu Ho-ching (Hong Kong) Cody Wong
March 4	Kuala Lumpur, Malaysia; Hard; W15; Singles and doubles draws	(Chinese Taipei) Cho I-hsuan (Chinese Taipei) Cho Yi-tsen; 6–3, 7–5	(Chinese Taipei) Lin Fang-an (China) Yuan Chengyiyi	(China) Xun Fangying (Chinese Taipei) Cho I-hsuan	(South Korea) Jang Ga-eul (Japan) Kanako Morisaki (Hong Kong) Wu Ho-ching (Hong Kong) Cody Wong
March 4	Monastir, Tunisia; Hard; W15; Singles and doubles draws	(Germany) Mara Guth; 6–2, 3–3, ret.	(Germany) Carolina Kuhl	(France) Diana Martynov (France) Alice Tubello	(Burundi) Sada Nahimana (Fiji) Saoirse Breen (Algeria) Inès Ibbou (China) Shi Han
March 4	Monastir, Tunisia; Hard; W15; Singles and doubles draws	(Argentina) Mayra Jovic (Italy) Valentina Losciale; 6–2, 6–3	(Netherlands) Warda Ait el Bachir (Morocco) Aya El Aouni	(France) Diana Martynov (France) Alice Tubello	(Burundi) Sada Nahimana (Fiji) Saoirse Breen (Algeria) Inès Ibbou (China) Shi Han
March 4	Antalya, Turkey; Clay; W15; Singles and doubles draws	(United States) Tyra Caterina Grant; 6–0, 6–4	(Serbia) Anja Stanković	Rada Zolotareva (Turkey) Başak Eraydın	(Italy) Anna Turati (Italy) Diletta Cherubini (Italy) Alessandra Mazzola (Italy) Aurora Zantedeschi
March 4	Antalya, Turkey; Clay; W15; Singles and doubles draws	(United States) Tyra Caterina Grant (Italy) Aurora Zantedeschi; 6–2, 6–2	(Ukraine) Yelyzaveta Kotliar (Ukraine) Antonina Sushkova	Rada Zolotareva (Turkey) Başak Eraydın	(Italy) Anna Turati (Italy) Diletta Cherubini (Italy) Alessandra Mazzola (Italy) Aurora Zantedeschi
March 11	Říčany Open; Říčany, Czech Republic; Hard (i); W75; Singles – Doubles	(Czech Republic) Tereza Valentová; 7–6^{(7–4)}, 6–2	(Ukraine) Daria Snigur	(Croatia) Antonia Ružić (Turkey) İpek Öz	Anastasia Tikhonova (Czech Republic) Dominika Šalková (Japan) Himeno Sakatsume (Germany) Mona Barthel
March 11	Říčany Open; Říčany, Czech Republic; Hard (i); W75; Singles – Doubles	(Czech Republic) Gabriela Knutson (Czech Republic) Tereza Valentová; 6–4, 3–6, [10–4]	(Hungary) Fanny Stollár (Switzerland) Lulu Sun	(Croatia) Antonia Ružić (Turkey) İpek Öz	Anastasia Tikhonova (Czech Republic) Dominika Šalková (Japan) Himeno Sakatsume (Germany) Mona Barthel
March 11	Mildura, Australia; Grass; W35; Singles and doubles draws	(Australia) Maddison Inglis; 6–4, 6–1	(Australia) Tina Nadine Smith	(Japan) Sakura Hosogi (Australia) Gabriella Da Silva-Fick	(New Zealand) Monique Barry (Japan) Yuki Naito (Australia) Lizette Cabrera (Japan) Misaki Matsuda
March 11	Mildura, Australia; Grass; W35; Singles and doubles draws	(Australia) Tahlia Kokkinis (Australia) Alicia Smith; 5–7, 6–2, [10–7]	(Thailand) Punnin Kovapitukted (China) Lu Jiajing	(Japan) Sakura Hosogi (Australia) Gabriella Da Silva-Fick	(New Zealand) Monique Barry (Japan) Yuki Naito (Australia) Lizette Cabrera (Japan) Misaki Matsuda
March 11	Alaminos, Cyprus; Clay; W35; Singles and doubles draws	(Croatia) Lucija Ćirić Bagarić; 6–2, 6–3	(North Macedonia) Lina Gjorcheska	(Italy) Nuria Brancaccio (Spain) Andrea Lázaro García	Ksenia Zaytseva (Romania) Cristina Dinu (Romania) Miriam Bulgaru (Spain) Irene Burillo Escorihuela
March 11	Alaminos, Cyprus; Clay; W35; Singles and doubles draws	(Croatia) Tena Lukas (France) Kristina Mladenovic; 6–4, 7–5	(Malta) Francesca Curmi (Romania) Cristina Dinu	(Italy) Nuria Brancaccio (Spain) Andrea Lázaro García	Ksenia Zaytseva (Romania) Cristina Dinu (Romania) Miriam Bulgaru (Spain) Irene Burillo Escorihuela
March 11	Santo Domingo, Dominican Republic; Hard; W35; Singles and doubles draws	(Australia) Maya Joint; 6–4, 2–6, 6–1	(China) Gao Xinyu	(Romania) Maria Sara Popa (Mexico) María Portillo Ramírez	(United States) Rasheeda McAdoo (Spain) Carlota Martínez Círez (Serbia) Katarina Jokić (Argentina) Solana Sierra
March 11	Santo Domingo, Dominican Republic; Hard; W35; Singles and doubles draws	(United States) Carmen Corley (United States) Ivana Corley; 6–1, 6–7^{(5–7)}, [12–10]	(Bulgaria) Lia Karatancheva (United States) Rasheeda McAdoo	(Romania) Maria Sara Popa (Mexico) María Portillo Ramírez	(United States) Rasheeda McAdoo (Spain) Carlota Martínez Círez (Serbia) Katarina Jokić (Argentina) Solana Sierra
March 11	Indore, India; Hard; W35; Singles and doubles draws	(Slovenia) Dalila Jakupović; 6–3, 6–2	(India) Shrivalli Bhamidipaty	Polina Iatcenko (Thailand) Mananchaya Sawangkaew	(Lithuania) Justina Mikulskytė (India) Ankita Raina (Sweden) Jacqueline Cabaj Awad (Thailand) Thasaporn Naklo
March 11	Indore, India; Hard; W35; Singles and doubles draws	(India) Shrivalli Bhamidipaty (India) Vaidehi Chaudhari; 6–3, 7–5	(Chinese Taipei) Lee Ya-hsuan (South Korea) Park So-hyun	Polina Iatcenko (Thailand) Mananchaya Sawangkaew	(Lithuania) Justina Mikulskytė (India) Ankita Raina (Sweden) Jacqueline Cabaj Awad (Thailand) Thasaporn Naklo
March 11	Solarino, Italy; Carpet; W35; Singles and doubles draws	(Slovakia) Viktória Hrunčáková; 6–2, 6–3	(United States) Robin Anderson	(Czech Republic) Linda Klimovičová (United States) Katrina Scott	(Poland) Urszula Radwańska (Poland) Martyna Kubka (Belgium) Magali Kempen (Czech Republic) Barbora Palicová
March 11	Solarino, Italy; Carpet; W35; Singles and doubles draws	(Poland) Weronika Falkowska (Poland) Martyna Kubka; 5–7, 6–1, [11–9]	(China) Feng Shuo (Netherlands) Stéphanie Visscher	(Czech Republic) Linda Klimovičová (United States) Katrina Scott	(Poland) Urszula Radwańska (Poland) Martyna Kubka (Belgium) Magali Kempen (Czech Republic) Barbora Palicová
March 11	São João da Boa Vista, Brazil; Clay; W15; Singles and doubles draws	(Brazil) Carolina Alves; 4–6, 6–1, 6–3	(Argentina) Julieta Lara Estable	(Argentina) Victoria Bosio (Germany) Emily Seibold	(Brazil) Ana Candiotto (Romania) Oana Gavrilă (Argentina) Melany Krywoj (Spain) Alicia Herrero Liñana
March 11	São João da Boa Vista, Brazil; Clay; W15; Singles and doubles draws	(Argentina) Victoria Bosio (Portugal) Ana Filipa Santos; 6–2, 6–4	(Italy) Verena Meliss (Italy) Camilla Zanolini	(Argentina) Victoria Bosio (Germany) Emily Seibold	(Brazil) Ana Candiotto (Romania) Oana Gavrilă (Argentina) Melany Krywoj (Spain) Alicia Herrero Liñana
March 11	Montreal, Canada; Hard (i); W15; Singles and doubles draws	(United States) Jessica Failla; 6–4, 6–3	(United States) Jessie Aney	(United Kingdom) Bronte Murgett (United States) Dasha Ivanova	(Canada) Emma Dong (Canada) Rhea Verma (Canada) Ana Grubor (United States) Paris Corley
March 11	Montreal, Canada; Hard (i); W15; Singles and doubles draws	(United States) Jessie Aney (France) Alice Robbe; 5–7, 6–3, [10–3]	(United States) Ashton Bowers (Poland) Zuzanna Pawlikowska	(United Kingdom) Bronte Murgett (United States) Dasha Ivanova	(Canada) Emma Dong (Canada) Rhea Verma (Canada) Ana Grubor (United States) Paris Corley
March 11	Sharm El Sheikh, Egypt; Hard; W15; Singles and doubles draws	(Norway) Malene Helgø; 6–3, 6–2	(Luxembourg) Marie Weckerle	(Cyprus) Daria Frayman (Egypt) Jana Hossam Salah	(Slovakia) Katarína Kužmová (China) Mi Tianmi (South Korea) Jeong Bo-young; Kseniya Yersh
March 11	Sharm El Sheikh, Egypt; Hard; W15; Singles and doubles draws	(Cyprus) Daria Frayman (Italy) Gaia Parravicini; 0–6, 6–3, [10–8]	(Slovakia) Laura Cíleková (Poland) Zuzanna Kolonus	(Cyprus) Daria Frayman (Egypt) Jana Hossam Salah	(Slovakia) Katarína Kužmová (China) Mi Tianmi (South Korea) Jeong Bo-young; Kseniya Yersh
March 11	Gonesse, France; Clay (i); W15; Singles and doubles draws	(France) Tiantsoa Sarah Rakotomanga Rajaonah; 6–4, 6–3	(France) Émeline Dartron	(Switzerland) Fiona Ganz (Spain) Cristina Díaz Adrover	(Sweden) Kajsa Rinaldo Persson (Ukraine) Veronika Podrez (Serbia) Jana Bojović (Spain) Carmen López Martínez
March 11	Gonesse, France; Clay (i); W15; Singles and doubles draws	(France) Émeline Dartron (France) Astrid Lew Yan Foon; 3–6, 6–0, [13–11]	(Belgium) Tilwith Di Girolami (France) Laïa Petretic	(Switzerland) Fiona Ganz (Spain) Cristina Díaz Adrover	(Sweden) Kajsa Rinaldo Persson (Ukraine) Veronika Podrez (Serbia) Jana Bojović (Spain) Carmen López Martínez
March 11	Heraklion, Greece; Clay; W15; Singles and doubles draws	(Slovakia) Nina Vargová; 6–3, 6–3	(Slovakia) Sofia Milatová	(Poland) Marcelina Podlińska (Serbia) Mila Mašić	(Greece) Sapfo Sakellaridi (Italy) Viola Turini (France) Lucie Nguyen Tan (Germany) Katharina Hobgarski
March 11	Heraklion, Greece; Clay; W15; Singles and doubles draws	(France) Lucie Nguyen Tan (Slovakia) Nina Vargová; 4–6, 6–4, [11–9]	(Italy) Laura Mair (Greece) Sapfo Sakellaridi	(Poland) Marcelina Podlińska (Serbia) Mila Mašić	(Greece) Sapfo Sakellaridi (Italy) Viola Turini (France) Lucie Nguyen Tan (Germany) Katharina Hobgarski
March 11	Karaganda, Kazakhstan; Hard (i); W15; Singles and doubles draws	Ksenia Laskutova; 6–4, 3–6, 6–3	(South Korea) Lee Eun-hye	(Estonia) Elena Malõgina (Kazakhstan) Zhibek Kulambayeva	Ekaterina Kazionova (Kazakhstan) Gozal Ainitdinova (France) Yaroslava Bartashevich (Romania) Alexandra Iordache
March 11	Karaganda, Kazakhstan; Hard (i); W15; Singles and doubles draws	Victoria Mikhaylova (Ukraine) Anastasiia Poplavska; 7–6^{(7–5)}, 6–3	(Kazakhstan) Asylzhan Arystanbekova; Ekaterina Kazionova	(Estonia) Elena Malõgina (Kazakhstan) Zhibek Kulambayeva	Ekaterina Kazionova (Kazakhstan) Gozal Ainitdinova (France) Yaroslava Bartashevich (Romania) Alexandra Iordache
March 11	Monastir, Tunisia; Hard; W15; Singles and doubles draws	(Slovakia) Radka Zelníčková; 6–2, 4–2, ret.	(Serbia) Elena Milovanović	(Austria) Tamira Paszek (Germany) Helena Buchwald	(Germany) Lara Schmidt (United Kingdom) Mingge Xu (Spain) María Martínez Vaquero (Poland) Gina Feistel
March 11	Monastir, Tunisia; Hard; W15; Singles and doubles draws	(United Kingdom) Mingge Xu (Slovakia) Radka Zelníčková; 2–6, 6–2, [10–6]	(Serbia) Elena Milovanović (Austria) Tamira Paszek	(Austria) Tamira Paszek (Germany) Helena Buchwald	(Germany) Lara Schmidt (United Kingdom) Mingge Xu (Spain) María Martínez Vaquero (Poland) Gina Feistel
March 11	Antalya, Turkey; Clay; W15; Singles and doubles draws	(Bulgaria) Denislava Glushkova; 6–4, 7–6^{(7–4)}	(Czech Republic) Denisa Hindová	(Hungary) Adrienn Nagy (United Kingdom) Jizel Matos Sequeira Fernandes	(Slovakia) Anika Jašková (Turkey) Başak Eraydın (Australia) Nina Alibalić; Diana Demidova
March 11	Antalya, Turkey; Clay; W15; Singles and doubles draws	(Czech Republic) Denisa Hindová (Italy) Vittoria Modesti; 7–5, 6–3	(Bulgaria) Dia Evtimova (Turkey) İlay Yörük	(Hungary) Adrienn Nagy (United Kingdom) Jizel Matos Sequeira Fernandes	(Slovakia) Anika Jašková (Turkey) Başak Eraydın (Australia) Nina Alibalić; Diana Demidova
March 18	Branik Maribor Open; Maribor, Slovenia; Hard (i); W75; Singles – Doubles	(Czech Republic) Dominika Šalková; 6–2, 6–4	(Australia) Talia Gibson	Elena Pridankina (Hungary) Tímea Babos	Ekaterina Maklakova (Georgia (country)) Mariam Bolkvadze (United Kingdom) Lily Miyazaki (France) Jessika Ponchet
March 18	Branik Maribor Open; Maribor, Slovenia; Hard (i); W75; Singles – Doubles	(United Kingdom) Eden Silva; Anastasia Tikhonova; 7–5, 6–3	(Thailand) Luksika Kumkhum (Thailand) Peangtarn Plipuech	Elena Pridankina (Hungary) Tímea Babos	Ekaterina Maklakova (Georgia (country)) Mariam Bolkvadze (United Kingdom) Lily Miyazaki (France) Jessika Ponchet
March 18	Swan Hill, Australia; Grass; W35; Singles and doubles draws	(Australia) Gabriella Da Silva-Fick; 3–6, 6–3, 6–1	(Australia) Emerson Jones	(Australia) Alana Parnaby (Australia) Tina Nadine Smith	(Australia) Maddison Inglis (Japan) Yuki Naito (New Zealand) Monique Barry (Japan) Misaki Matsuda
March 18	Swan Hill, Australia; Grass; W35; Singles and doubles draws	(Japan) Sakura Hosogi (Japan) Misaki Matsuda; 6–2, 6–2	(New Zealand) Monique Barry (Australia) Alana Parnaby	(Australia) Alana Parnaby (Australia) Tina Nadine Smith	(Australia) Maddison Inglis (Japan) Yuki Naito (New Zealand) Monique Barry (Japan) Misaki Matsuda
March 18	Alaminos, Cyprus; Clay; W35; Singles and doubles draws	(France) Loïs Boisson; 6–2, 6–0	(Greece) Despina Papamichail	(France) Carole Monnet (Italy) Deborah Chiesa	(Romania) Cristina Dinu (Poland) Maja Chwalińska (Romania) Andreea Mitu (Germany) Noma Noha Akugue
March 18	Alaminos, Cyprus; Clay; W35; Singles and doubles draws	(Malta) Francesca Curmi (Greece) Despina Papamichail; 6–3, 6–2	(Switzerland) Leonie Küng (United Kingdom) Eliz Maloney	(France) Carole Monnet (Italy) Deborah Chiesa	(Romania) Cristina Dinu (Poland) Maja Chwalińska (Romania) Andreea Mitu (Germany) Noma Noha Akugue
March 18	Campinas, Brazil; Clay; W15; Singles and doubles draws	(Romania) Oana Gavrilă; 6–2, 3–6, 6–1	Ekaterina Makarova	(Argentina) Julieta Lara Estable (Brazil) Carolina Alves	(Argentina) Victoria Bosio (Czech Republic) Michaela Bayerlová (Brazil) Gabriela Cé (Romania) Irina Fetecău
March 18	Campinas, Brazil; Clay; W15; Singles and doubles draws	(United States) Jaeda Daniel; Maria Kononova; 6–0, 6–7^{(3–7)}, [10–4]	(Brazil) Júlia Konishi Camargo Silva (Japan) Wakana Sonobe	(Argentina) Julieta Lara Estable (Brazil) Carolina Alves	(Argentina) Victoria Bosio (Czech Republic) Michaela Bayerlová (Brazil) Gabriela Cé (Romania) Irina Fetecău
March 18	Sharm El Sheikh, Egypt; Hard; W15; Singles and doubles draws	(Norway) Malene Helgø; 6–1, 6–0	(France) Julie Belgraver	(Poland) Daria Kuczer (Romania) Karola Bejenaru	(North Macedonia) Magdalena Stoilkovska (Romania) Elena-Teodora Cadar (Czech Republic) Alena Kovačková (United Kingdom) Talia Neilson-Gatenby
March 18	Sharm El Sheikh, Egypt; Hard; W15; Singles and doubles draws	(France) Julie Belgraver (United Kingdom) Holly Hutchinson; 7–6^{(7–4)}, 3–6, [10–7]	(Romania) Karola Bejenaru (South Korea) Jeong Bo-young	(Poland) Daria Kuczer (Romania) Karola Bejenaru	(North Macedonia) Magdalena Stoilkovska (Romania) Elena-Teodora Cadar (Czech Republic) Alena Kovačková (United Kingdom) Talia Neilson-Gatenby
March 18	Le Havre, France; Clay (i); W15; Singles and doubles draws	(France) Alice Tubello; 6–3, 1–6, 6–3	(France) Tiantsoa Sarah Rakotomanga Rajaonah	(Italy) Enola Chiesa (Italy) Camilla Gennaro	(Sweden) Kajsa Rinaldo Persson (Netherlands) Merel Hoedt (France) Maneva Rakotomalala (Switzerland) Fiona Ganz
March 18	Le Havre, France; Clay (i); W15; Singles and doubles draws	(Romania) Elena Ruxandra Bertea (France) Tiantsoa Sarah Rakotomanga Rajaonah; 7–5, 6–1	(Serbia) Bojana Marinković (Germany) Antonia Schmidt	(Italy) Enola Chiesa (Italy) Camilla Gennaro	(Sweden) Kajsa Rinaldo Persson (Netherlands) Merel Hoedt (France) Maneva Rakotomalala (Switzerland) Fiona Ganz
March 18	Heraklion, Greece; Clay; W15; Singles and doubles draws	(Greece) Sapfo Sakellaridi; 6–3, 6–3	(Slovakia) Sofia Milatová	Polina Leykina (Slovakia) Nina Vargová	(Czech Republic) Nikola Břečková (Romania) Carmen Andreea Herea (Germany) Marie Vogt (Israel) Mika Buchnik
March 18	Heraklion, Greece; Clay; W15; Singles and doubles draws	(Germany) Katharina Hobgarski; Polina Leykina; 4–6, 6–1, [10–3]	(Italy) Irene Lavino (Greece) Sapfo Sakellaridi	Polina Leykina (Slovakia) Nina Vargová	(Czech Republic) Nikola Břečková (Romania) Carmen Andreea Herea (Germany) Marie Vogt (Israel) Mika Buchnik
March 18	Hinode, Japan; Hard; W15; Singles and doubles draws	(United States) Maegan Manasse; 6–3, 6–2	(Japan) Aoi Ito	(Belgium) Sofia Costoulas (Japan) Kayo Nishimura	(South Korea) Kim Da-bin (Japan) Momoko Kobori (Slovakia) Viktória Morvayová (Japan) Rina Saigo
March 18	Hinode, Japan; Hard; W15; Singles and doubles draws	(Japan) Shiori Tominaga (Japan) Hikaru Yoshikawa; 6–3, 0–6, [10–7]	(Japan) Erina Hayashi (Japan) Kanako Morisaki	(Belgium) Sofia Costoulas (Japan) Kayo Nishimura	(South Korea) Kim Da-bin (Japan) Momoko Kobori (Slovakia) Viktória Morvayová (Japan) Rina Saigo
March 18	Sabadell, Spain; Clay; W15; Singles and doubles draws	(Spain) Kaitlin Quevedo; 6–0, 6–4	(Sweden) Caijsa Hennemann	(Croatia) Iva Primorac (Germany) Joëlle Steur	(Latvia) Daniela Vismane (Peru) Anastasia Iamachkine (Spain) Martina Genís Salas (Spain) Lucía Cortez Llorca
March 18	Sabadell, Spain; Clay; W15; Singles and doubles draws	(Romania) Oana Georgeta Simion (Germany) Joëlle Steur; 2–6, 7–6^{(7–5)}, [10–7]	(Spain) Yvonne Cavallé Reimers (Sweden) Caijsa Hennemann	(Croatia) Iva Primorac (Germany) Joëlle Steur	(Latvia) Daniela Vismane (Peru) Anastasia Iamachkine (Spain) Martina Genís Salas (Spain) Lucía Cortez Llorca
March 18	Monastir, Tunisia; Hard; W15; Singles and doubles draws	(Slovakia) Radka Zelníčková; 5–7, 6–3, 6–2	Evialina Laskevich	(United Kingdom) Mingge Xu (Germany) Johanna Silva	(Switzerland) Arlinda Rushiti (Italy) Lara Pfeifer (Belgium) Amelia Waligora (France) Alice Soulié
March 18	Monastir, Tunisia; Hard; W15; Singles and doubles draws	Evialina Laskevich (Slovakia) Radka Zelníčková; 6–0, 6–1	(Serbia) Elena Milovanović (Bulgaria) Isabella Shinikova	(United Kingdom) Mingge Xu (Germany) Johanna Silva	(Switzerland) Arlinda Rushiti (Italy) Lara Pfeifer (Belgium) Amelia Waligora (France) Alice Soulié
March 18	Antalya, Turkey; Clay; W15; Singles and doubles draws	(Bulgaria) Denislava Glushkova; 6–4, 6–4	(Serbia) Luna Vujović	Anastasia Zolotareva (Czech Republic) Anna Sisková	Julia Avdeeva (Czech Republic) Denisa Hindová (Austria) Ekaterina Perelygina (Czech Republic) Linda Ševčíková
March 18	Antalya, Turkey; Clay; W15; Singles and doubles draws	Ekaterina Agureeva; Ekaterina Ovcharenko; 6–0, 7–5	(Bulgaria) Denislava Glushkova; Anastasiia Grechkina	Anastasia Zolotareva (Czech Republic) Anna Sisková	Julia Avdeeva (Czech Republic) Denisa Hindová (Austria) Ekaterina Perelygina (Czech Republic) Linda Ševčíková
March 25	Open de Seine-et-Marne; Croissy-Beaubourg, France; Hard (i); W75; Singles – Doubles	(United Kingdom) Lily Miyazaki; 6–4, 7–5	(Germany) Mona Barthel	(France) Margaux Rouvroy (United Kingdom) Amarni Banks	(France) Manon Léonard (Switzerland) Céline Naef (Australia) Arina Rodionova (France) Audrey Albié
March 25	Open de Seine-et-Marne; Croissy-Beaubourg, France; Hard (i); W75; Singles – Doubles	(France) Estelle Cascino (Philippines) Alex Eala; 7–5, 7–6^{(7–4)}	(United Kingdom) Maia Lumsden (France) Jessika Ponchet	(France) Margaux Rouvroy (United Kingdom) Amarni Banks	(France) Manon Léonard (Switzerland) Céline Naef (Australia) Arina Rodionova (France) Audrey Albié
March 25	São Paulo, Brazil; Clay; W50; Singles and doubles draws	Maria Kozyreva; 5–7, 6–0, 6–3	(Italy) Miriana Tona	(Brazil) Carolina Alves; Daria Lodikova	(Chile) Fernanda Labraña (France) Séléna Janicijevic (Argentina) Julieta Lara Estable; Ekaterina Makarova
March 25	São Paulo, Brazil; Clay; W50; Singles and doubles draws	Doubles competition abandoned due to ongoing poor weather		(Brazil) Carolina Alves; Daria Lodikova	(Chile) Fernanda Labraña (France) Séléna Janicijevic (Argentina) Julieta Lara Estable; Ekaterina Makarova
March 25	Kōfu International Open; Kōfu, Japan; Hard; W50; Singles and doubles draws	(United States) Catherine Harrison; 6–7^{(8–10)}, 6–1, 6–1	(Chinese Taipei) Lee Ya-hsuan	(Thailand) Mananchaya Sawangkaew (Thailand) Lanlana Tararudee	(United States) Maegan Manasse (Japan) Sara Saito (Australia) Destanee Aiava (Japan) Haruka Kaji
March 25	Kōfu International Open; Kōfu, Japan; Hard; W50; Singles and doubles draws	(Japan) Erina Hayashi (Japan) Saki Imamura; 6–3, 7–5	(India) Rutuja Bhosale (India) Ankita Raina	(Thailand) Mananchaya Sawangkaew (Thailand) Lanlana Tararudee	(United States) Maegan Manasse (Japan) Sara Saito (Australia) Destanee Aiava (Japan) Haruka Kaji
March 25	Murska Sobota, Slovenia; Hard (i); W50; Singles and doubles draws	(Slovakia) Viktória Hrunčáková; 6–0, 6–3	Valeria Savinykh	(Uzbekistan) Nigina Abduraimova (Czech Republic) Dominika Šalková	(Czech Republic) Nikola Bartůňková (Germany) Lara Schmidt (Czech Republic) Barbora Palicová (United Kingdom) Katy Dunne
March 25	Murska Sobota, Slovenia; Hard (i); W50; Singles and doubles draws	(Portugal) Francisca Jorge (United States) Anna Rogers; 6–4, 5–7, [10–8]	(Uzbekistan) Nigina Abduraimova (Czech Republic) Jesika Malečková	(Uzbekistan) Nigina Abduraimova (Czech Republic) Dominika Šalková	(Czech Republic) Nikola Bartůňková (Germany) Lara Schmidt (Czech Republic) Barbora Palicová (United Kingdom) Katy Dunne
March 25	Santa Margherita di Pula, Italy; Clay; W35; Singles and doubles draws	(Switzerland) Leonie Küng; 6–4, 6–4	(Greece) Sapfo Sakellaridi	(Italy) Martina Colmegna (Germany) Anne Schäfer	(Italy) Angelica Raggi (Belgium) Clara Vlasselaer (Italy) Anastasia Abbagnato (France) Alice Ramé
March 25	Santa Margherita di Pula, Italy; Clay; W35; Singles and doubles draws	(Greece) Sapfo Sakellaridi (Italy) Aurora Zantedeschi; 6–4, 6–2	(Czech Republic) Lucie Havlíčková (Serbia) Lola Radivojević	(Italy) Martina Colmegna (Germany) Anne Schäfer	(Italy) Angelica Raggi (Belgium) Clara Vlasselaer (Italy) Anastasia Abbagnato (France) Alice Ramé
March 25	Terrassa, Spain; Clay; W35; Singles and doubles draws	(France) Loïs Boisson; 6–0, 7–6^{(8–6)}	(Belgium) Hanne Vandewinkel	(France) Nahia Berecoechea (Greece) Despina Papamichail	(Latvia) Daniela Vismane (Spain) Irene Burillo Escorihuela (Sweden) Caijsa Hennemann (Czech Republic) Julie Štruplová
March 25	Terrassa, Spain; Clay; W35; Singles and doubles draws	(Slovenia) Nika Radišić (Bosnia and Herzegovina) Anita Wagner; 7–5, 7–6^{(9–7)}	(Spain) Yvonne Cavallé Reimers (India) Vasanti Shinde	(France) Nahia Berecoechea (Greece) Despina Papamichail	(Latvia) Daniela Vismane (Spain) Irene Burillo Escorihuela (Sweden) Caijsa Hennemann (Czech Republic) Julie Štruplová
March 25	Sharm El Sheikh, Egypt; Hard; W15; Singles and doubles draws	(Slovakia) Renáta Jamrichová; 2–6, 6–3, 6–3	(Romania) Elena-Teodora Cadar	(Romania) Ioana Zvonaru (Czech Republic) Alena Kovačková	(Romania) Karola Bejenaru (Poland) Weronika Ewald (Slovakia) Salma Drugdová (France) Julie Belgraver
March 25	Sharm El Sheikh, Egypt; Hard; W15; Singles and doubles draws	(Slovakia) Salma Drugdová (Poland) Daria Kuczer; 6–4, 6–3	(Poland) Weronika Ewald (Hong Kong) Adithya Karunaratne	(Romania) Ioana Zvonaru (Czech Republic) Alena Kovačková	(Romania) Karola Bejenaru (Poland) Weronika Ewald (Slovakia) Salma Drugdová (France) Julie Belgraver
March 25	Monastir, Tunisia; Hard; W15; Singles and doubles draws	Evialina Laskevich; 6–1, 6–1	(Serbia) Elena Milovanović	(Spain) Noelia Bouzó Zanotti (Kosovo) Arlinda Rushiti	(Germany) Johanna Silva (Poland) Gina Feistel (Germany) Selina Dal (Austria) Arabella Koller
March 25	Monastir, Tunisia; Hard; W15; Singles and doubles draws	(Germany) Selina Dal (Poland) Gina Feistel; 3–6, 6–4, [10–1]	(France) Yasmine Mansouri (Serbia) Elena Milovanović	(Spain) Noelia Bouzó Zanotti (Kosovo) Arlinda Rushiti	(Germany) Johanna Silva (Poland) Gina Feistel (Germany) Selina Dal (Austria) Arabella Koller
March 25	Antalya, Turkey; Clay; W15; Singles and doubles draws	(Italy) Beatrice Ricci; 6–4, 6–3	Ksenia Laskutova	(Germany) Helena Buchwald (Latvia) Kamilla Bartone	Daria Egorova (Germany) Chantal Sauvant (Germany) Carolin Raschdorf (Hungary) Luca Udvardy
March 25	Antalya, Turkey; Clay; W15; Singles and doubles draws	Anastasiia Grechkina; Ksenia Laskutova; 6–3, 6–1	Ekaterina Ovcharenko (Switzerland) Katerina Tsygourova	(Germany) Helena Buchwald (Latvia) Kamilla Bartone	Daria Egorova (Germany) Chantal Sauvant (Germany) Carolin Raschdorf (Hungary) Luca Udvardy
