= Říčany Open =

- 2024 Říčany Open

ITF Women's Tour
- Event name: Říčany Open (2024–); Smartwings Open (2023)
- Location: Říčany, Czech Republic
- Venue: Pliskova Tennis Academy - Říčany
- Category: ITF Women's World Tennis Tour
- Surface: Hard / Indoor
- Draw: 32S/32Q/16D
- Prize money: $60,000

The Říčany Open is a tournament for professional female tennis players played on indoor hard courts. The event is classified as a $60,000 ITF Women's World Tennis Tour tournament and has been held in Říčany, Czech Republic, since 2023.

== Past finals ==
=== Singles ===
| Year | Champion | Runner-up | Score |
|---|---|---|---|
| 2024 | (Czech Republic) Tereza Valentová | (Ukraine) Daria Snigur | 7–6^{(7–4)}, 6–2 |
| 2023 | (Croatia) Antonia Ružić | (Netherlands) Lesley Pattinama Kerkhove | 6–4, 6–1 |

=== Doubles ===
| Year | Champions | Runners-up | Score |
|---|---|---|---|
| 2024 | (Czech Republic) Gabriela Knutson (Czech Republic) Tereza Valentová | (Hungary) Fanny Stollár (Switzerland) Lulu Sun | 6–4, 3–6, [10–4] |
| 2023 | (Germany) Tayisiya Morderger (Germany) Yana Morderger | (Uzbekistan) Nigina Abduraimova; Alena Fomina-Klotz | 6–1, 4–6, [10–6] |
