= 2024 Říčany Open =

Tennis tournament

- Date: 11–17 March 2024
- Edition: 2nd
- Category: ITF Women's World Tennis Tour
- Prize money: $60,000
- Surface: Hard / Indoor
- Location: Říčany, Czech Republic

Champions

Singles
- (Czech Republic) Tereza Valentová

Doubles
- (Czech Republic) Gabriela Knutson / (Czech Republic) Tereza Valentová
- Říčany Open

The 2024 Říčany Open was a professional tennis tournament played on indoor hard courts. It was the second edition of the tournament, which was part of the 2024 ITF Women's World Tennis Tour. It took place in Říčany, Czech Republic, between 11 and 17 March 2024.

== Champions ==
=== Singles ===
- (Czech Republic) Tereza Valentová def. (Ukraine) Daria Snigur, 7–6^{(7–4)}, 6–2

=== Doubles ===
- (Czech Republic) Gabriela Knutson / (Czech Republic) Tereza Valentová def. (Hungary) Fanny Stollár / (Switzerland) Lulu Sun, 6–4, 3–6, [10–4]

== Singles main draw entrants ==
=== Seeds ===
Country	Player	Rank	Seed
UKR	Daria Snigur	135	1
FRA	Fiona Ferro	144	2
GER	Eva Lys	146	3
JPN	Moyuka Uchijima	148	4
CZE	Tereza Martincová	150	5
SUI	Lulu Sun	151	6
AUS	Kimberly Birrell	160	7
AUT	Sinja Kraus	164	8

- Rankings are as of 4 March 2024.

=== Other entrants ===
The following players received wildcards into the singles main draw:

- (Czech Republic) Kateřina Hajná
- (Czech Republic) Lucie Havlíčková
- (Czech Republic) Laura Samson
- (Czech Republic) Tereza Valentová

The following player received entry into the singles main draw as a special exempt:

- (Netherlands) Suzan Lamens

The following players received entry from the qualifying draw:

- (Italy) Silvia Ambrosio
- (Germany) Mona Barthel
- (Czech Republic) Nikola Bartůňková
- (United Kingdom) Katy Dunne
- (Australia) Talia Gibson
- (France) Amandine Hesse
- (Czech Republic) Aneta Laboutková
- (Turkey) İpek Öz
