= Tereza Valentová =

Czech tennis player (born 2007)

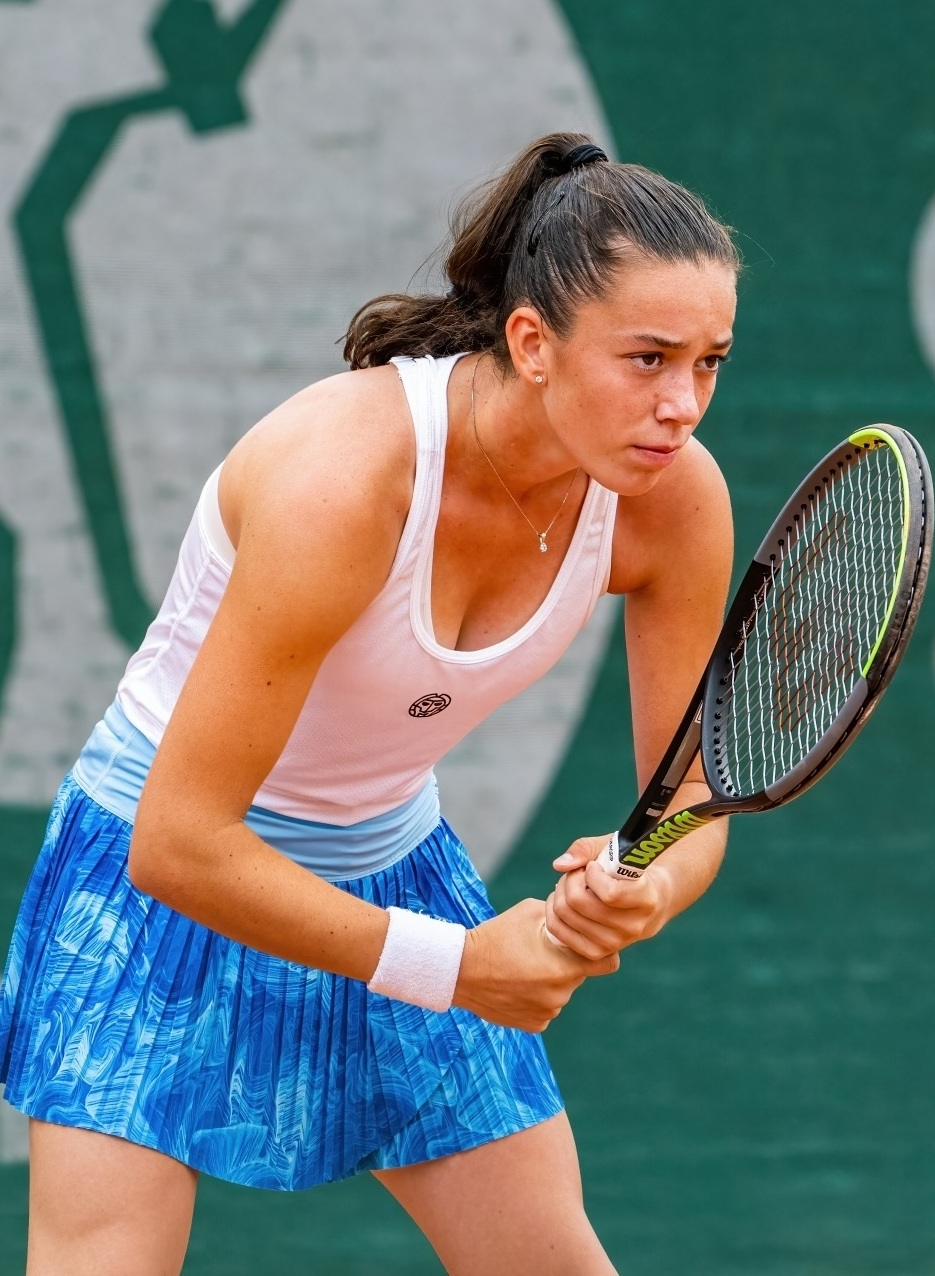
- Valentová in 2022
- Country (sports): Czech Republic
- Residence: Prague, Czech Republic
- Born: 20 February 2007 (age 19) Prague
- Height: 174 cm (5 ft 9 in)
- Plays: Right (two-handed backhand)
- Prize money: US$ 1,250,144

Singles
- Career record: 123–45
- Career titles: 2 WTA 125
- Highest ranking: No. 42 (25 May 2026)
- Current ranking: No. 88 (19 October 2026)

Grand Slam singles results
- Australian Open: 3R (2026)
- French Open: 2R (2025)
- Wimbledon: 1R (2026)
- US Open: 2R (2025)

Doubles
- Career record: 29–17
- Career titles: 4 ITF
- Highest ranking: No. 225 (27 July 2026)
- Current ranking: No. 228 (31 August 2026)

Grand Slam doubles results
- French Open: 1R (2026)
- Wimbledon: 1R (2026)
- Last updated on: 8 September 2026.

Tereza Valentová (born 20 February 2007) is a Czech professional tennis player. She has career-high WTA rankings of No. 42 in singles and No. 225 in doubles. Valentová reached a best junior combined ranking of No. 4 on 10 June 2024 and won both the 2024 French Open singles and doubles titles.

== Early life and background ==
Valentová was born to Marcel Valenta and Jitka Janáčková. Her mother is a former sprint canoeist who represented Czechoslovakia and the Czech Republic at the 1992 and 1996 Summer Olympics, respectively. She began playing tennis at the age of three after watching her father play. She currently trains at TK Sparta Prague.

== Juniors ==
Valentová reached the final of the 2023 US Open in girls' singles, but lost to Katherine Hui. She won the 2024 French Open girls' singles title, defeating compatriot Laura Samson in the final. She also won the 2024 French Open girls' doubles title, partnering Renáta Jamrichová.

=== Grand Slam performance ===
Singles:

- Australian Open: QF (2023)
- French Open: W (2024)
- Wimbledon: 2R (2023)
- US Open: F (2023)

Doubles:

- Australian Open: 1R (2022)
- French Open: W (2024)
- Wimbledon: 2R (2023)
- US Open: 2R (2023)

== Professional ==
=== 2021–23: WTA Tour debut, ITF Circuit doubles title ===
In July 2021, Valentová received a wildcard into the qualifying draw of the Prague Open, but lost to Naiktha Bains. Later that year, she made her ITF main draw debut at the $25k event in Jablonec nad Nisou, but lost in the first round to Johana Marková. In October 2022, she received a wildcard into the qualifying draw of the Ostrava Open, but lost in the first round to Anna Karolína Schmiedlová.

In May 2023, she recorded her first senior win in the first round of the Advantage Cars Prague Open. The following month, she reached the semifinal of the Říčany Open, upsetting top seed Laura Pigossi in the process. At the ITS Cup, she reached the quarterfinals in singles and won her first ITF doubles title, partnering Magdaléna Smékalová. She made her WTA Tour doubles debut with a wildcard into the main draw of the Prague Open, where she and partner Nikola Bartůňková reached the semifinals. She also received a wildcard into the singles qualifying draw, but lost in the first round to Dayana Yastremska.

=== 2024: First ITF singles titles ===
In February, Valentová won back-to-back ITF singles titles at $15k events in Monastir. She followed this up with back-to-back titles at the Říčany Open, where she also won in doubles, and the $35k event in Sharm El Sheikh. At the $50k Lopota Tennis Open, she reached the singles quarterfinal and won the doubles title with partner Viktória Hrunčáková. In May, she reached the singles final of the $35k event in Annenheim, but lost to Marie Benoît.

=== 2025: First WTA Tour final, WTA 125 title ===
Valentová made her major main-draw debut at the French Open, after a final qualifying round win over Simona Waltert. She then defeated wildcard entrant Chloé Paquet to record her first major win, before losing to second seed Coco Gauff in the second round.

In June, Valentová won her first WTA 125 title at the Città di Grado Tennis Cup, defeating Barbora Palicová in the final. She then made it to the final of Wimbledon qualifying but lost to Anastasia Zakharova in three sets.

In July, Valentová won her second WTA 125 title at the Porto Open, defeating Lanlana Tararudee in the final. As a result she moved to a new career-high ranking at world No. 106. The following week at the Prague Open, she overcame Aoi Ito, second seed Rebecca Šramková and lucky loser Jessika Ponchet to reach her first WTA Tour semifinal, which she lost to fifth seed and eventual champion, Marie Bouzková. As a result of her performance in Prague, Valentová broke into the top 100 in the WTA rankings for the first time at world No. 92 on 28 July 2025, making her only the fifth teenager to hit that milestone, alongside Mirra Andreeva, Maya Joint, Iva Jovic, and Victoria Mboko.

At the US Open, she qualified for the main draw and defeated fellow qualifier Lucia Bronzetti for her second major win, before losing to world No. 10, Elena Rybakina, in the second round.

In October at the Japan Women's Open, Valentová made it into her first tour final with a run which included wins over third seed Elise Mertens, sixth seed Olga Danilović, and Jaqueline Cristian. She lost the championship match to fourth seed Leylah Fernandez, in three sets.

=== 2026: Australian Open third round, second Prague semifinal ===
At the Australian Open, Valentová qualified for the main draw and recorded wins over 30th seed Maya Joint and fellow Czech player Linda Fruhvirtová to reach the third round, at which point she lost to fifth seed and eventual champion Elena Rybakina.

She made the second round at the WTA 1000 events in Doha, where she lost to 14th seed and eventual champion Karolína Muchová, and Miami, where she was eliminated by 20th seed Diana Shnaider.

In May as top seed, Valentová made it through to her third WTA 125 final at the Open de Saint-Malo, losing to seventh seed Moyuka Uchijima in three sets. The following week at the Italian Open, she defeated Yulia Putintseva, before losing to third seed Coco Gauff.

At the Eastbourne Open, Valentová recorded wins over wildcard entrant Hannah Klugman and qualifier Ajla Tomljanović to reach her first WTA grass-court quarterfinal, at which point she lost to Tatjana Maria. On her Wimbledon main-draw debut, she lost to wildcard entrant Karolína Plíšková in the first round.

Seeded seventh at the Athens Open, Valentová defeated Sofia Costoulas and Aliaksandra Sasnovich, before losing to Alina Korneeva in the quarterfinals. As fifth seed at the Prague Open, she overcame lucky loser Priscilla Hon, Maya Joint and top seeded, defending champion, Marie Bouzková to make it through to the semifinals for the second successive year. Valentová lost in the last four to eighth seed Daria Snigur.

In August, she reached the final at the WTA 125 Philly Open, losing to Katie Volynets. During the match Valentová required a medical timeout for treatment on a hip injury which subsequently caused her to withdraw from the following week's US Open.

== Performance timelines ==
Key
W	F	SF	QF	#R	RR	Q#	P#	DNQ	A	Z#	PO	G	S	B	NMS	NTI	P	NH

(W) winner; (F) finalist; (SF) semifinalist; (QF) quarterfinalist; (#R) rounds 4, 3, 2, 1; (RR) round-robin stage; (Q#) qualification round; (P#) preliminary round; (DNQ) did not qualify; (A) absent; (Z#) Davis/Fed Cup Zonal Group (with number indication) or (PO) play-off; (G) gold, (S) silver or (B) bronze Olympic/Paralympic medal; (NMS) not a Masters tournament; (NTI) not a Tier I tournament; (P) postponed; (NH) not held; (SR) strike rate (events won / competed); (W–L) win–loss record.
To avoid confusion and double counting, these charts are updated at the conclusion of a tournament or when the player's participation has ended.

Only main-draw results in WTA Tour, Grand Slam tournaments, Billie Jean King Cup, United Cup, Hopman Cup and Olympic Games are included in win–loss records.

=== Singles ===
Current through the 2026 Pan Pacific Open.

Tournament	2025	2026	SR	W–L	Win %
Grand Slam tournaments
Australian Open	A	3R	0 / 1	2–1	67%
French Open	2R	1R	0 / 2	1–2	33%
Wimbledon	Q3	1R	0 / 1	0–1	0%
US Open	2R	A	0 / 1	1–1	50%
Win–Loss	2–2	2–3	0 / 5	4–5	44%
WTA 1000 tournaments
Qatar Open	A	2R	0 / 0	1–1	50%
Dubai Championships	A	Q1	0 / 0	0–0	–
Indian Wells Open	A	1R	0 / 1	0–1	0%
Miami Open	A	2R	0 / 1	1–1	50%
Madrid Open	A	1R	0 / 1	0–1	0%
Italian Open	A	2R	0 / 1	1–1	50%
Canadian Open	A	1R	0 / 1	0–1	0%
Cincinnati Open	A	2R	0 / 1	1–1	50%
China Open	A	A	0 / 0	0–0	–
Wuhan Open	Q1	A	0 / 0	0–0	–
Win–Loss	0–0	4–7	0 / 7	4–7	36%
Career statistics
	2025	2026	SR	W–L	Win %
Tournaments	4	18	Career total: 22		
Titles	0	0	Career total: 0		
Finals	1	0	Career total: 1		
Hard win–loss	8–3	12–12	0 / 15	20–15	57%
Clay win–loss	1–1	1–3	0 / 4	2–4	33%
Grass win–loss	0–0	2–3	0 / 3	2–3	40%
Overall win–loss	9–4	15–18	0 / 22	24–22	52%
Win %	69%	45%	Career total: 52%		
Year-end ranking	56		$876,266		

=== Doubles ===
Current through the 2026 Wuhan Open.

Tournament	2023	2024	2025	2026	SR	W–L	Win %
Grand Slam tournaments
Australian Open	A	A	A	A	0 / 1	0–1	0%
French Open	A	A	A	1R	0 / 0	0–0	–
Wimbledon	A	A	A	1R	0 / 1	0–1	0%
US Open	A	A	A	A	0 / 0	0–0	–
Win–Loss	0–0	0–0	0–0	0–2	0 / 2	0–2	0%
WTA 1000 tournaments
Qatar Open	NTI	A	A	1R	0 / 0	0–1	0%
Dubai Championships	A	A	A	A	0 / 0	0–0	–
Indian Wells Open	A	A	A	A	0 / 0	0–0	–
Miami Open	A	A	A	2R	0 / 1	1–1	50%
Madrid Open	A	A	A	A	0 / 0	0–0	–
Italian Open	A	A	A	QF	0 / 1	1–1	50%
Canadian Open	A	A	A	A	0 / 0	0–0	–
Cincinnati Open	A	A	A	A	0 / 0	0–0	–
China Open	A	A	A	A	0 / 0	0–0	–
Wuhan Open	NH	A	A	A	0 / 0	0–0	–
Win–Loss	0–0	0–0	0–0	2–3	0 / 3	2–3	40%
Career statistics
	2023	2024	2025	2026	SR	W–L	Win %
Tournaments	1	0	1	7	Career total: 9		
Titles	0	0	0	0	Career total: 0		
Finals	0	0	0	0	Career total: 0		
Hard win–loss	1–1	0–0	1–2	1–4	0 / 5	3–7	30%
Clay win–loss	0–0	0–0	0–0	1–2	0 / 2	1–2	33%
Grass win–loss	0–0	0–0	0–0	0–2	0 / 2	0–2	0%
Overall win–loss	1–1	0–0	1–2	2–8	0 / 9	4–11	27%
Win %	50%	–	33%	20%	Career total: 27%		
Year-end ranking	383	415	635				

== WTA Tour finals ==
=== Singles: 1 (runner-up) ===
Legend WTA 250 (0–1)	Finals by surface Hard (0–1)	Finals by setting Outdoor (0–1)

Result	Date	Tournament	Tier	Surface	Opponent	Score
Loss	Oct 2025	Japan Women's Open, Japan	WTA 250	Hard	(Canada) Leylah Fernandez	0–6, 7–5, 3–6

== WTA 125 finals ==
=== Singles: 4 (2 titles, 2 runner-ups) ===
Result	W–L	Date	Tournament	Surface	Opponent	Score
Win	1–0	Jun 2025	Grado Tennis Cup, Italy	Clay	(Czech Republic) Barbora Palicová	6–2, 4–6, 6–1
Win	2–0	Jul 2025	Porto Open, Portugal	Hard	(Thailand) Lanlana Tararudee	6–4, 6–2
Loss	2–1	May 2026	Open de Saint-Malo, France	Clay	(Japan) Moyuka Uchijima	7–6^{(7–2)}, 3–6, 1–6
Loss	2–2	Aug 2026	Philly Open, United States	Hard	(United States) Katie Volynets	3–6, 5–7

== ITF Circuit finals ==
=== Singles: 10 (7 titles, 3 runner-ups) ===
Legend W75 tournaments (4–1) W50 tournaments (0–1) W35 tournaments (1–1) W15 tournaments (2–0)	Finals by surface Hard (6–2) Clay (1–1)

Result	W–L	Date	Tournament	Tier	Surface	Opponent	Score
Win	1–0	Feb 2024	ITF Monastir, Tunisia	W15	Hard	(China) Ren Yufei	6–3, 6–2
Win	2–0	Feb 2024	ITF Monastir, Tunisia	W15	Hard	(France) Audrey Albié	6–2, 6–1
Win	3–0	Mar 2024	Říčany Open, Czech Republic	W75	Hard (i)	(Ukraine) Daria Snigur	7–6^{(7–4)}, 6–2
Win	4–0	Apr 2024	ITF Sharm El Sheikh, Egypt	W35	Hard	(Czech Republic) Linda Klimovičová	7–5, 6–2
Loss	4–1	May 2024	ITF Annenheim, Austria	W35	Clay	(Belgium) Marie Benoît	5–7, 6–3, 5–7
Win	5–1	Jun 2024	Macha Lake Open, Czech Republic	W75	Clay	(Czech Republic) Aneta Kučmová	6–3, 7–5
Loss	5–2	Nov 2024	Trnava Indoor, Slovakia	W50	Hard (i)	(Croatia) Antonia Ružić	3–6, 2–6
Win	6–2	Jan 2025	Porto Indoor, Portugal	W75	Hard (i)	(Germany) Nastasja Schunk	6–3, 6–4
Loss	6–3	Mar 2025	Trnava Indoor, Slovakia	W75	Hard (i)	(Switzerland) Valentina Ryser	4–6, 6–3, 6–7^{(4–7)}
Win	7–3	Mar 2025	ITF Murska Sobota, Slovenia	W75	Hard (i)	(Georgia (country)) Mariam Bolkvadze	1–6, 6–3, 6–2

=== Doubles: 5 (4 titles, 1 runner-up) ===
Legend W60/75 tournaments (2–1) W50 tournaments (1–0) W15 tournaments (1–0)	Finals by surface Hard (3–1) Clay (1–0)

Result	W–L	Date	Tournament	Tier	Surface	Partner	Opponents	Score
Win	1–0	Jul 2023	ITS Cup Olomouc, Czech Republic	W60	Clay	(Czech Republic) Magdaléna Smékalová	(Kazakhstan) Zhibek Kulambayeva (Latvia) Darja Semeņistaja	6–2, 6–2
Win	2–0	Feb 2024	ITF Monastir, Tunisia	W15	Hard	(Slovakia) Radka Zelníčková	(Italy) Angelica Raggi (Bulgaria) Ani Vangelova	6–4, 6–2
Win	3–0	Mar 2024	Říčany Open, Czech Republic	W75	Hard (i)	(Czech Republic) Gabriela Knutson	(Hungary) Fanny Stollár (Switzerland) Lulu Sun	6–4, 3–6, [10–4]
Win	4–0	Apr 2024	ITF Lopota, Georgia	W50	Hard	(Slovakia) Viktória Hrunčáková	(Japan) Nagi Hanatani (Poland) Urszula Radwańska	6–2, 6–1
Loss	4–1	Jan 2025	Porto Indoor, Portugal	W75	Hard (i)	(Germany) Noma Noha Akugue	(Hong Kong) Eudice Chong (Slovenia) Nika Radišić	6–7^{(5–7)}, 1–6

== Junior Grand Slam tournament finals ==
=== Singles: 2 (1 title, 1 runner-up) ===
Result	Year	Tournament	Surface	Opponent	Score
Loss	2023	US Open	Hard	(United States) Katherine Hui	4–6, 4–6
Win	2024	French Open	Clay	(Czech Republic) Laura Samson	6–3, 7–6^{(7–0)}

=== Doubles: 1 (title) ===
Result	Year	Tournament	Surface	Partner	Opponents	Score
Win	2024	French Open	Clay	(Slovakia) Renáta Jamrichová	(United States) Tyra Caterina Grant (United States) Iva Jovic	6–4, 6–4

== Gallery ==
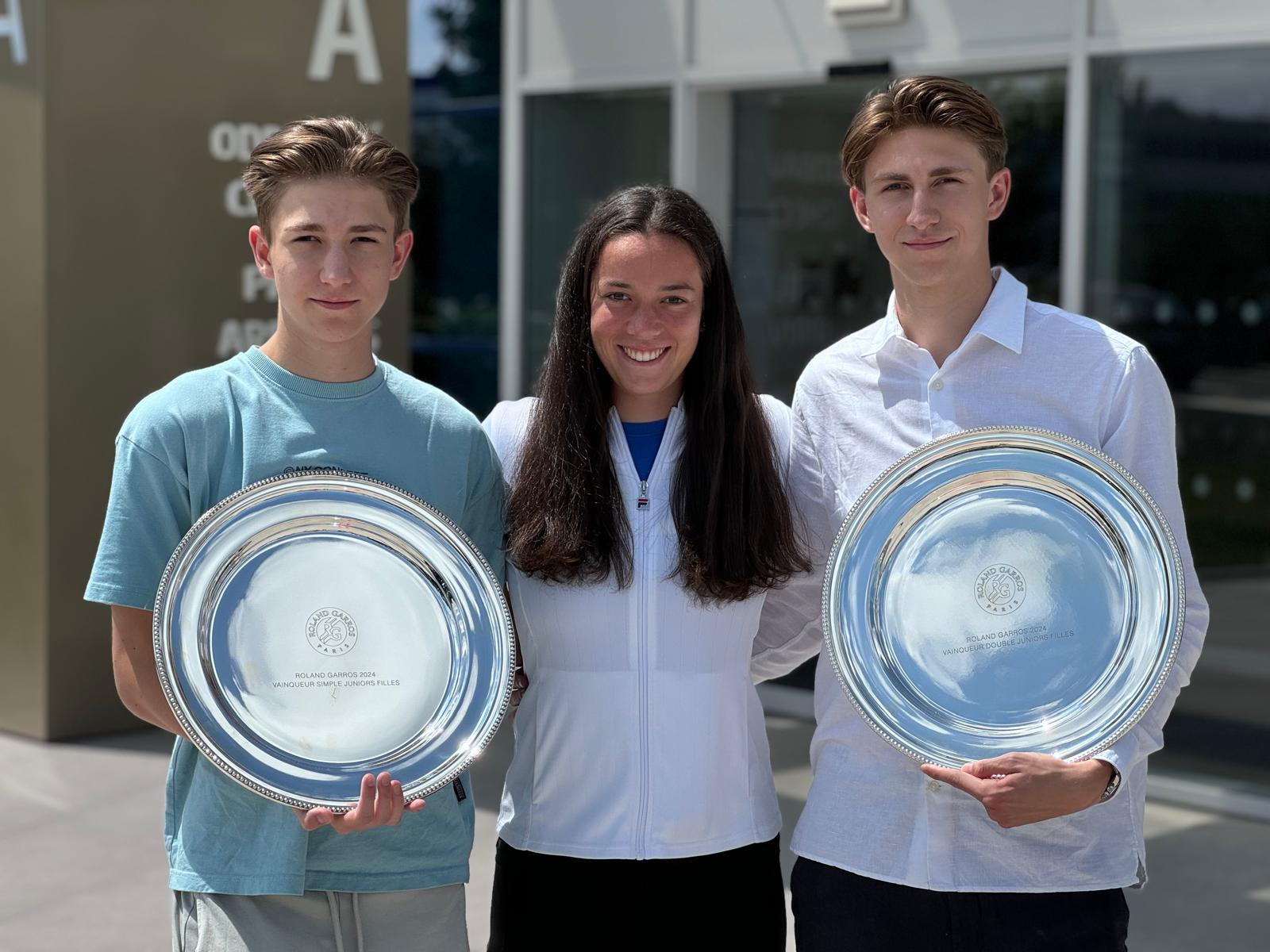
Tereza Valentová with her cousins Jan Valenta (on the left) and Michal Valenta (on the right) holding the 2024 French Open trophies for girls' singles and doubles titles.
