= 2024 Říčany Open – Singles =

Singles
- 2024 Říčany Open

Final
- Champion: (Czech Republic) Tereza Valentová
- Runner-up: (Ukraine) Daria Snigur
- Score: 7–6^{(7–4)}, 6–2

Events
| Singles | Doubles |
| ← 2023 · | Říčany Open | · 2025 → |

Antonia Ružić was the defending champion. but lost to Daria Snigur in the semifinals.

Tereza Valentová won the title, defeating Daria Snigur in the final, 7–6^{(7–4)}, 6–2.

== Seeds ==
1. (Ukraine) Daria Snigur (final)
2. (France) Fiona Ferro (second round)
3. (Germany) Eva Lys (second round, withdrew)
4. (Japan) Moyuka Uchijima (first round)
5. (Czech Republic) Tereza Martincová (second round, withdrew)
6. (Switzerland) Lulu Sun (second round)
7. (Australia) Kimberly Birrell (first round)
8. (Austria) Sinja Kraus (first round)

== Draw ==
=== Key ===
- Q = Qualifier
- WC = Wild card
- LL = Lucky loser
- Alt = Alternate
- SE = Special exempt
- PR = Protected ranking
- ITF = ITF entry
- JE = Junior exempt
- w/o = Walkover
- r = Retired
- d = Defaulted
- SR = Special ranking

=== Finals ===
Semifinals
1 | (Ukraine) Daria Snigur | 7 | 7^{7}
(Croatia) Antonia Ružić | 5 | 6^{4}
WC | (Czech Republic) Tereza Valentová | 6 | 7
Q | (Turkey) İpek Öz | 3 | 5

Final
1 | (Ukraine) Daria Snigur | 6^{4} | 2
WC | (Czech Republic) Tereza Valentová | 7^{7} | 6

=== Top half ===
First round
1 | (Ukraine) D Snigur | 6 | 6
(Turkey) Z Sönmez | 4 | 2
P Kudermetova | 7 | 6
Q | (Czech Republic) N Bartůňková | 5 | 3
A Tikhonova | 6 | 6
Q | (France) A Hesse | 1 | 0
Q | (Australia) T Gibson | 4 | 5
6 | (Switzerland) L Sun | 6 | 7
3 | (Germany) E Lys | 6 | 6
V Savinykh | 4 | 3
(Croatia) A Ružić | 6 | 6
WC | (Czech Republic) L Havlíčková | 1 | 4
Q | (Italy) S Ambrosio | 3 | 6 | 1
(Czech Republic) G Knutson | 6 | 4 | 6
(Czech Republic) D Šalková | 6 | 6
8 | (Austria) S Kraus | 3 | 1

Second round
1 | (Ukraine) D Snigur | 6 | 6
P Kudermetova | 2 | 4
A Tikhonova | 6 | 4 | 6
6 | (Switzerland) L Sun | 2 | 6 | 4
3 | (Germany) E Lys
(Croatia) A Ružić | w/o
(Czech Republic) G Knutson | 4 | 3
(Czech Republic) D Šalková | 6 | 6

Quarterfinals
1 | (Ukraine) D Snigur | 6 | 6
A Tikhonova | 2 | 3
(Croatia) A Ružić | 6 | 6
(Czech Republic) D Šalková | 1 | 4

Semifinals
1 | (Ukraine) D Snigur | 7 | 7^{7}
(Croatia) A Ružić | 5 | 6^{4}

=== Bottom half ===
First round
5 | (Czech Republic) T Martincová | 6 | 6
Q | (Czech Republic) A Laboutková | 3 | 3
WC | (Czech Republic) T Valentová | 3 | 7^{7} | 6
SE | (Netherlands) S Lamens | 6 | 6^{5} | 3
(Japan) H Sakatsume | 6 | 6
WC | (Czech Republic) K Hajná | 0 | 0
(United Kingdom) L Miyazaki | 6 | 6
4 | (Japan) M Uchijima | 4 | 3
7 | (Australia) K Birrell | 6 | 3 | 5
Q | (United Kingdom) K Dunne | 3 | 6 | 7
A Falei | 6 | 2 | 1^{r}
Q | (Turkey) İ Öz | 3 | 6 | 4
Q | (Germany) M Barthel | 7 | 6
WC | (Czech Republic) L Samson | 5 | 3
(Hungary) P Udvardy | 4 | 1
2 | (France) F Ferro | 6 | 6

Second round
5 | (Czech Republic) T Martincová
WC | (Czech Republic) T Valentová | w/o
(Japan) H Sakatsume | 6 | 4 | 6
(United Kingdom) L Miyazaki | 0 | 6 | 4
Q | (United Kingdom) K Dunne | 2 | 4
Q | (Turkey) İ Öz | 6 | 6
Q | (Germany) M Barthel | 4 | 6 | 6
2 | (France) F Ferro | 6 | 1 | 1

Quarterfinals
WC | (Czech Republic) T Valentová | 6 | 6
(Japan) H Sakatsume | 1 | 1
Q | (Turkey) İ Öz | 6 | 6
Q | (Germany) M Barthel | 2 | 1

Semifinals
WC | (Czech Republic) T Valentová | 6 | 7
Q | (Turkey) İ Öz | 3 | 5
