= 2024 Říčany Open – Doubles =

Doubles
- 2024 Říčany Open

Final
- Champions: (Czech Republic) Gabriela Knutson (Czech Republic) Tereza Valentová
- Runners-up: (Hungary) Fanny Stollár (Switzerland) Lulu Sun
- Score: 6–4, 3–6, [10–4]

Events
Singles	Doubles
← 2023 ·	Říčany Open	· 2025 →

Tayisiya Morderger and Yana Morderger were the defending champions but chose not to participate.

Gabriela Knutson and Tereza Valentová won the title, defeating Fanny Stollár and Lulu Sun in the final, 6–4, 3–6, [10–4].

== Seeds ==
1. Amina Anshba / (Czech Republic) Anastasia Dețiuc (first round)
2. (Georgia (country)) Natela Dzalamidze / Anastasia Tikhonova (quarterfinals)
3. (United Kingdom) Alicia Barnett / (United Kingdom) Freya Christie (quarterfinals)
4. (Venezuela) Andrea Gámiz / (Colombia) Yuliana Lizarazo (first round)

== Draw ==
Key

- Q = Qualifier
- WC = Wild card
- LL = Lucky loser
- Alt = Alternate
- ITF = ITF entry
- PR = Protected ranking
- SR = Special ranking
- SE = Special exempt
- JE = Junior exempt
- JR = Junior Accelerator Programme entrant
- CO = College Accelerator Programme entrant
- NG = Next Gen Accelerator Program entrant
- w/o = Walkover
- r = Retired
- d = Defaulted

First round
1	A Anshba (Czech Republic) A Dețiuc	2	6	[5]
A Falei; V Savinykh	6	4	[10]
WC	(Czech Republic) G Knutson (Czech Republic) T Valentová	6	7^{7}
WC	(Czech Republic) L Havlíčková (Czech Republic) D Šalková	4	6^{4}
3	(United Kingdom) A Barnett (United Kingdom) F Christie	3	6	[10]
(United Kingdom) A Collins (United States) J Loeb	6	0	[4]
WC	(Czech Republic) N Bartůňková (Czech Republic) A Kučmová	5	3
(Chinese Taipei) E-s Liang (China) Q Tang	7	6
(United Kingdom) E Appleton (Hong Kong) E Chong	3	2
(Hungary) F Stollár (Switzerland) L Sun	6	6
(Netherlands) I Haverlag (United Kingdom) L Miyazaki	6	6
4	(Venezuela) A Gámiz (Colombia) Y Lizarazo	2	2
(Australia) K Birrell (Japan) M Uchijima	6	4	[10]
P Kudermetova (Chinese Taipei) Y-y Yang	4	6	[7]
(United Kingdom) SB Grey (United Kingdom) E Silva	7^{7}	3	[5]
2	(Georgia (country)) N Dzalamidze; A Tikhonova	6^{2}	6	[10]

Quarterfinals
A Falei; V Savinykh
WC	(Czech Republic) G Knutson (Czech Republic) T Valentová	w/o
3	(United Kingdom) A Barnett (United Kingdom) F Christie	4	4
(Chinese Taipei) E-s Liang (China) Q Tang	6	6
(Hungary) F Stollár (Switzerland) L Sun	4	6	[10]
(Netherlands) I Haverlag (United Kingdom) L Miyazaki	6	4	[1]
(Australia) K Birrell (Japan) M Uchijima	7^{7}	7^{7}
2	(Georgia (country)) N Dzalamidze; A Tikhonova	6^{5}	6^{2}

Semifinals
WC	(Czech Republic) G Knutson (Czech Republic) T Valentová	6	6
(Chinese Taipei) E-s Liang (China) Q Tang	2	2
(Hungary) F Stollár (Switzerland) L Sun	4	6	[10]
(Australia) K Birrell (Japan) M Uchijima	6	4	[7]

Final
WC	(Czech Republic) G Knutson (Czech Republic) T Valentová	6	3	[10]
(Hungary) F Stollár (Switzerland) L Sun	4	6	[4]
