= Gabriela Knutson =

Czech tennis player

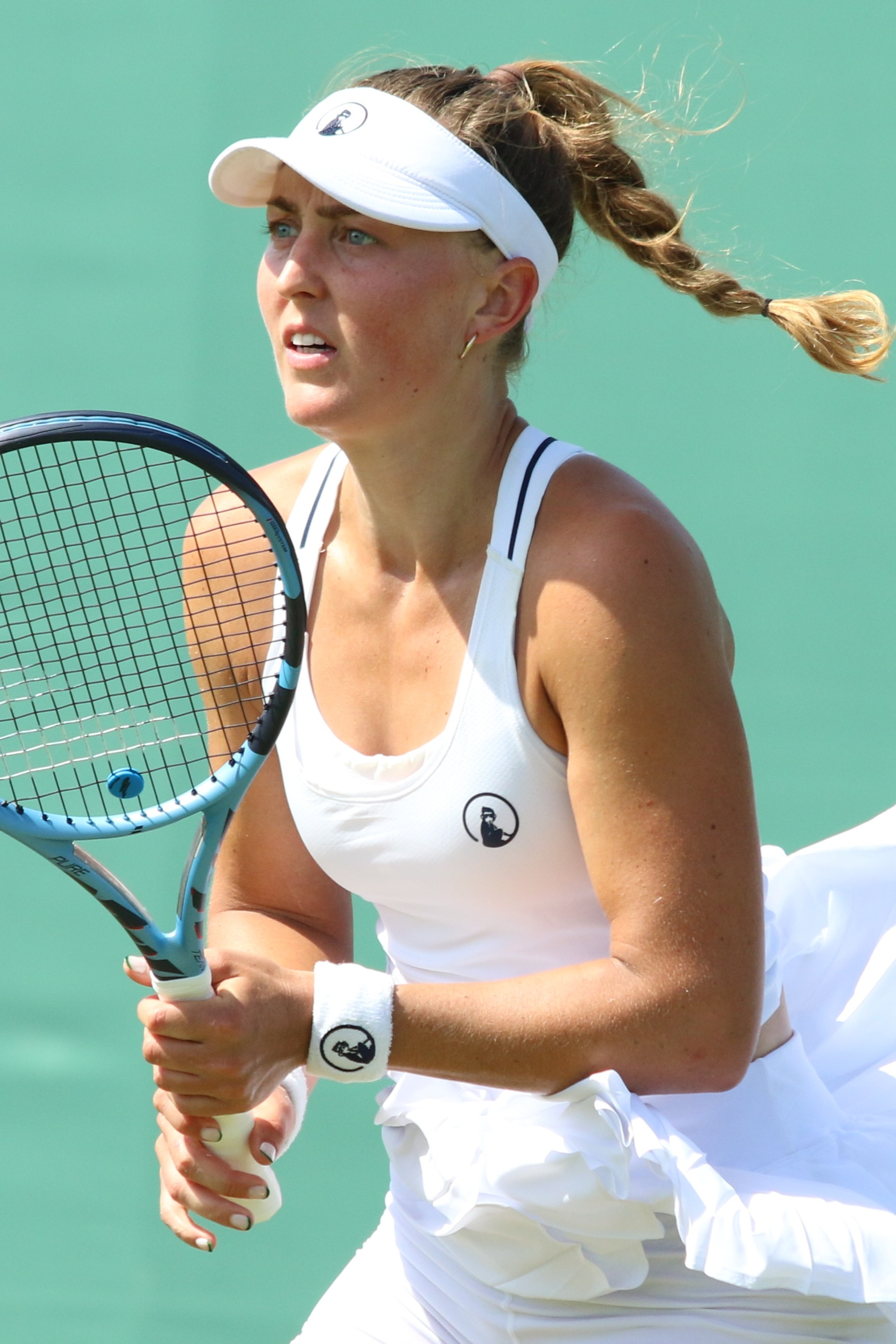
- Knutson at 2026 Wimbledon Qualifying
- Country (sports): Czech Republic
- Born: 21 April 1997 (age 29) Fair Oaks, California, U.S.
- Turned pro: 2022
- Plays: Right-handed
- College: Syracuse; Durham University
- Prize money: $486,133

Singles
- Career record: 186–126
- Career titles: 6 ITF
- Highest ranking: No. 155 (6 November 2023)
- Current ranking: No. 187 (10 August 2026)

Grand Slam singles results
- Australian Open: Q3 (2024)
- French Open: Q1 (2024, 2025, 2026)
- Wimbledon: Q2 (2024, 2025)
- US Open: 1R (2026)

Doubles
- Career record: 61–44
- Career titles: 1 WTA 125, 6 ITF
- Highest ranking: No. 197 (20 April 2026)
- Current ranking: No. 304 (10 August 2026)
- Last updated on: 17 August 2026.

Gabriela Andrea Knutson (Czech: Gabriela Andrea Knutsonová; born 21 April 1997) is a Czech tennis player.

Knutson has a career-high singles by the WTA of 155, achieved on 6 November 2023, and a best doubles ranking of world No. 197, reached on 20 April 2026.

== Early life ==
Knutson is the daughter of an American father and Czech mother. At the age of 12, she moved from California to the Czech Republic. She later accepted an offer from a tennis academy in Prostějov and moved there.

Knutson left mainstream schooling after the fifth grade and completed the rest of her education online. Her childhood tennis idol was Caroline Wozniacki.

== Career ==
=== Junior ===
As a junior, Knutson reached her highest ranking of 272 on 5 May 2014. Her sole singles title on the ITF Junior Circuit was the 2014 Safina Cup, a Grade 4 event.

=== College ===
Knutson played college tennis at Syracuse University, where she majored in broadcast journalism at the Newhouse School of Public Communications. A blue chip recruit, she ranked as high as No. 4 in the college rankings and participated in the singles draw of the NCAA Division I Championships in both 2018 and 2019. In 2018, Knutson was named a singles All-American, the first Syracuse player to do so since 1995. She finished her college career with 179 combined wins, the second most in program history behind fellow Czech Jana Strnadová.

From 2019, Knutson attended Durham University on a postgraduate scholarship, where she studied for a MSc in Marketing as a member of Hatfield College and represented the university in BUCS tennis. She stayed on at Durham following the outbreak of the COVID-19 pandemic to undertake a second postgraduate degree, migrating from Hatfield to Ustinov College. In 2022, she was named the Team Durham Sportswoman of the Year.

=== Professional ===
Knutson made her WTA Tour main-draw debut at the 2023 Prague Open, after defeating Greet Minnen and Naiktha Bains in qualifying, before losing in the first round to Tereza Martincová, in three sets.

She was offered a wildcard for the main draw of the 2023 US Open but declined, as it was conditional on switching her sporting nationality to the United States.

Knutson played her second WTA Tour main draw at the 2026 ASB Classic in Auckland, after defeating Leyre Romero Gormaz and Maja Chwalinska in qualifying, before losing in the first round to third seed Iva Jovic, in three sets.

== Performance timeline ==
Key
W	F	SF	QF	#R	RR	Q#	P#	DNQ	A	Z#	PO	G	S	B	NMS	NTI	P	NH

(W) winner; (F) finalist; (SF) semifinalist; (QF) quarterfinalist; (#R) rounds 4, 3, 2, 1; (RR) round-robin stage; (Q#) qualification round; (P#) preliminary round; (DNQ) did not qualify; (A) absent; (Z#) Davis/Fed Cup Zonal Group (with number indication) or (PO) play-off; (G) gold, (S) silver or (B) bronze Olympic/Paralympic medal; (NMS) not a Masters tournament; (NTI) not a Tier I tournament; (P) postponed; (NH) not held; (SR) strike rate (events won / competed); (W–L) win–loss record.
To avoid confusion and double counting, these charts are updated at the conclusion of a tournament or when the player's participation has ended.

Only main-draw results in WTA Tour and Grand Slam tournaments, Billie Jean King Cup, United Cup, Hopman Cup and Olympic Games are included in win–loss records.

=== Singles ===
Current through 2026 US Open.

Tournament	2023	2024	2025	2026	SR	W–L
Grand Slam tournaments
Australian Open	A	Q3	A	Q1	0 / 0	0–0
French Open	A	Q1	Q1	Q1	0 / 0	0–0
Wimbledon	A	Q2	Q2	Q1	0 / 0	0–0
US Open	A	Q1	A	1R	0 / 1	0–1
Win–Loss	0–0	0–0	0–0	0–1	0 / 1	0–1
Career statistics
Tournaments	1	0	0	1	Career total: 2	
Overall Win–Loss	0–1	0–0	0–0	0–1	0 / 2	0–2

== WTA 125 finals ==
=== Singles: 3 (runner-ups) ===
Result	W–L	Date	Tournament	Surface	Opponent	Score
Loss	0–1	Sep 2025	Caldas da Rainha Open, Portugal	Hard	Polina Iatcenko	2–6, 7–5, 2–6
Loss	0–2	Aug 2026	Polish Open, Poland	Hard	(United States) Carol Young Suh Lee	4–6, 5–7
Loss	0–3	Sep 2026	Caldas da Rainha Open, Portugal	Hard	(Italy) Lisa Pigato	4–6, 2–6

=== Doubles: 1 (title) ===
Result	W–L	Date	Tournament	Surface	Partner	Opponents	Score
Win	1–0	Feb 2026	Oeiras Indoors, Portugal	Hard (i)	(Slovakia) Viktória Hrunčáková	(United States) Carmen Corley (United States) Ivana Corley	7–6^{(9–7)}, 6–3

== ITF Circuit finals ==
=== Singles: 10 (6 titles, 4 runner-ups) ===
Legend W60/75 tournaments (1–2) W50 tournaments (2–1) W25 tournaments (3–1)	Finals by surface Hard (6–4)

Result	W–L	Date	Tournament	Tier	Surface	Opponent	Score
Loss	0–1	Feb 2023	Georgia's Rome Open, US	W60	Hard (i)	(United States) Peyton Stearns	6–3, 0–6, 2–6
Win	1–1	Mar 2023	ITF Fredericton, Canada	W25	Hard	(Japan) Himeno Sakatsume	6–4, 6–4
Win	2–1	May 2023	ITF Monzón, Spain	W25	Hard	(Australia) Maddison Inglis	6–2, 6–2
Loss	2–2	May 2023	ITF Monastir, Tunisia	W25	Hard	(Australia) Taylah Preston	6–3, 6–7^{(5)}, 3–6
Win	3–2	Jun 2023	ITF Guimarães, Portugal	W25	Hard	(United States) Madison Sieg	6–3, 6–4
Win	4–2	Oct 2023	ITF Quinta do Lago, Portugal	W40	Hard	(United Kingdom) Harriet Dart	6–4, 6–1
Loss	4–3	Nov 2023	Open Nantes Atlantique, France	W60	Hard (i)	(France) Océane Dodin	7–6^{(2)}, 3–6, 2–6
Loss	4–4	Jun 2024	ITF Montemor-o-Novo, Portugal	W50	Hard	(Hong Kong) Eudice Chong	6–3, 2–6, 1–6
Win	5–4	Jul 2024	ITF Corroios, Portugal	W50	Hard	(Georgia (country)) Mariam Bolkvadze	6–1, 6–3
Win	6–4	Feb 2025	ITF Prague, Czech Republic	W75	Hard (i)	(Australia) Destanee Aiava	6–4, 3–6, 7–5

=== Doubles: 10 (6 titles, 4 runner-ups) ===
Legend W60/75 tournaments (3–3) W50 tournaments (1–0) W25 tournaments (2–1)	Finals by surface Hard (5–3) Clay (1–1)

Result	W–L	Date	Tournament	Tier	Surface	Partner	Opponents	Score
Win	1–0	Apr 2022	ITF Nottingham, UK	W25	Hard	(Slovakia) Katarína Strešnaková	(United Kingdom) Lauryn John-Baptiste (France) Alice Robbe	7–6^{(5)}, 6–3
Loss	1–1	Jun 2022	ITF Santo Domingo, DR	W25	Hard	(Slovakia) Katarína Strešnaková	(Spain) Alicia Herrero Liñana (Argentina) Melany Krywoj	2–6, 4–6
Win	2–1	Oct 2022	GB Pro-Series Loughborough, UK	W25	Hard (i)	(Chinese Taipei) Joanna Garland	(Poland) Martyna Kubka (Estonia) Elena Malõgina	6–3, 6–3
Loss	2–2	Feb 2023	Georgia's Rome Open, US	W60	Hard (i)	(Japan) Mana Ayukawa	(Hungary) Fanny Stollár (Switzerland) Lulu Sun	4–6, 5–7
Win	3–2	Feb 2024	ITF Pretoria, South Africa	W50	Hard	(Israel) Lina Glushko	(Belgium) Sofia Costoulas (Belgium) Hanne Vandewinkel	7–6^{(5)}, 7–6^{(4)}
Win	4–2	Mar 2024	Říčany Open, Czech Republic	W75	Hard (i)	(Czech Republic) Tereza Valentová	(Hungary) Fanny Stollár (Switzerland) Lulu Sun	6–4, 3–6, [10–4]
Win	5–2	Apr 2025	Open Saint-Gaudens, France	W75	Clay	(Czech Republic) Anna Sisková	(France) Émeline Dartron (France) Tiantsoa; Rakotomanga Rajaonah	6–2, 6–2
Loss	5–3	May 2025	Internazionali di Brescia, Italy	W75	Clay	(Latvia) Darja Semeņistaja	(Poland) Maja Chwalińska (Austria) Sinja Kraus	0–6, 3–6
Loss	5–4	Sep 2025	ITF Évora, Portugal	W50	Hard	(United States) Malaika Rapolu	(United States) Catherine Harrison (United States) Ashley Lahey	1–6, 6–1, [8–10]
Win	6–4	Mar 2026	Branik Maribor Open, Slovenia	W75	Hard (i)	(Germany) Anna-Lena Friedsam	(France) Jessika Ponchet (Czech Republic) Anna Sisková	4–6, 6–4, [10–6]
