= 2026 Curitiba Open =

- Date: 26 October–1 November
- Edition: 1st
- Category: WTA 125
- Draw: 32S / 8D
- Prize money: $115,000
- Surface: Clay
- Location: Curitiba, Brazil
- Venue: Graciosa Country Club

Champions

Singles
- (France) Alice Tubello

Doubles
- (Slovenia) Dalila Jakupović / (Slovenia) Nika Radišić
- Curitiba Open

The 2026 Curitiba Open was a professional women's tennis tournament played on outdoor clay courts. It was the 1st edition of this WTA 125 tournament, which was part of the 2026 WTA 125 Circuit. It took place at the Graciosa Country Club in Curitiba, Brazil, from 26 October through 1 November 2026.

== Singles main draw entrants ==
=== Seeds ===
Country	Player	Rank^{†}	Seed
GBR	Francesca Jones	99	1
AUT	Julia Grabher	102	2
ARG	Solana Sierra	104	3
CZE	Laura Samson	116	4
ESP	Leyre Romero Gormaz	129	5
ITA	Lucia Bronzetti	135	6
ARG	Julia Riera	141	7
ARG	Jazmín Ortenzi	150	8

^{†} Ranking are as of 19 October 2026.

=== Other entrants ===
The following players received wildcards into the singles main draw :

- (Brazil) Eduarda Gomes
- (Brazil) Júlia Konishi Camargo Silva
- (Brazil) Rebeca Pereira
- (Brazil) Marjorie Souza

The following players received entry from the qualifying draw :

- (Argentina) Lourdes Ayala
- (Argentina) Berta Bonardi
- (Argentina) Luna María Cinalli
- (Chile) Fernanda Labraña

=== Withdrawals ===
Before the tournament

- (Italy) Nuria Brancaccio → replaced by (Brazil) Gabriela Cé
- (Slovenia) Veronika Erjavec → replaced by (Brazil) Nauhany Vitória Leme da Silva
- (Poland) Gina Feistel → replaced by (Brazil) Ana Candiotto
- (Italy) Giorgia Pedone → replaced by (Brazil) Luiza Fullana
- (Latvia) Darja Semeņistaja → replaced by (Argentina) Justina María González Daniele
- (Italy) Aurora Zantedeschi → replaced by (Argentina) María Florencia Urrutia

=== Retirement ===
- (United Kingdom) Francesca Jones (left hip injury)

== Doubles main draw entrants ==
=== Seeds ===
Country	Player	Country	Player	Rank^{1}	Seed
SLO	Dalila Jakupović	SLO	Nika Radišić	149	1
BRA	Ana Candiotto	GRE	Despina Papamichail	439	2

- ^{1} Rankings as of 19 October 2026.

=== Other entrants ===
The following pair received a wildcard into the doubles main draw:

- (Brazil) Júlia Konishi Camargo Silva / (Brazil) Marjorie Souza

== Finals ==
=== Singles ===
- (France) Alice Tubello def. (Austria) Julia Grabher 3–6, 7–6^{(7–5)}, 7–6^{(7–2)}

=== Doubles ===
- (Slovenia) Dalila Jakupović / (Slovenia) Nika Radišić def. (Brazil) Nauhany Vitória Leme da Silva / (Brazil) Laura Pigossi 6–4, 6–2
