= 2024 Porto Women's Indoor ITF 1 =

Tennis tournament

- Date: 22–28 January 2024
- Edition: 5th
- Category: ITF Women's World Tennis Tour
- Prize money: $60,000
- Surface: Hard / Indoor
- Location: Porto, Portugal

Champions

Singles
- (Spain) Jéssica Bouzas Maneiro

Doubles
- (United Kingdom) Sarah Beth Grey / (United Kingdom) Olivia Nicholls
← 2023 ·	Porto Women's Indoor ITF	· 2024 →

The 2024 Porto Women's Indoor ITF 1 was a professional tennis tournament played on indoor hard courts. It was the fifth edition of the tournament, which was part of the 2024 ITF Women's World Tennis Tour. It took place in Porto, Portugal, between 22 and 28 January 2024.

== Champions ==
=== Singles ===
- (Spain) Jéssica Bouzas Maneiro def. (Poland) Maja Chwalińska, 3–6, 6–0, 6–4

=== Doubles ===
- (United Kingdom) Sarah Beth Grey / (United Kingdom) Olivia Nicholls def. (Portugal) Francisca Jorge / (Portugal) Matilde Jorge, 4–6, 6–3, [10–6]

== Singles main draw entrants ==
=== Seeds ===
Country	Player	Rank	Seed
ESP	Marina Bassols Ribera	111	1
GBR	Harriet Dart	112	2
ESP	Nuria Párrizas Díaz	114	3
COL	Emiliana Arango	119	4
ITA	Lucrezia Stefanini	126	5
SWE	Rebecca Peterson	128	6
SVK	Rebecca Šramková	129	7
FRA	Léolia Jeanjean	143	8

- Rankings are as of 15 January 2024.

=== Other entrants ===
The following players received wildcards into the singles main draw:

- (Portugal) Lena Couto
- (Portugal) Maria Garcia
- (Portugal) Francisca Jorge
- (Portugal) Ana Filipa Santos

The following players received entry into the singles main draw using special rankings:

- (Poland) Maja Chwalińska
- Oksana Selekhmeteva

The following players received entry from the qualifying draw:

- (Italy) Silvia Ambrosio
- (United States) Robin Anderson
- (Bosnia and Herzegovina) Nefisa Berberović
- Alina Charaeva
- (United Kingdom) Sonay Kartal
- (Austria) Sinja Kraus
- (Germany) Nastasja Schunk
- (Liechtenstein) Kathinka von Deichmann

The following player received entry as a lucky loser:

- (France) Audrey Albié
