= 2026 Curitiba Open – Singles =

Singles
- 2026 Curitiba Open

Final
- Champion: (France) Alice Tubello
- Runner-up: (Austria) Julia Grabher
- Score: 3–6, 7–6^{(7–5)}, 7–6^{(7–2)}

Details
- Draw: 32 (4Q / 4WC)
- Seeds: 8

Events
Singles	Doubles
- Curitiba Open

Alice Tubello won the title, after defeating Julia Grabher 3–6, 7–6^{(7–5)}, 7–6^{(7–2)} in the final.

This was the first edition of the tournament.

== Seeds ==
1. (United Kingdom) Francesca Jones (quarterfinals, retired)
2. (Austria) Julia Grabher (final)
3. (Argentina) Solana Sierra (quarterfinals)
4. (Czech Republic) Laura Samson (first round)
5. (Spain) Leyre Romero Gormaz (quarterfinals)
6. (Italy) Lucia Bronzetti (first round)
7. (Argentina) Julia Riera (semifinals)
8. (Argentina) Jazmín Ortenzi (quarterfinals)

== Draw ==
Key

- Q = Qualifier
- WC = Wild card
- LL = Lucky loser
- Alt = Alternate
- ITF = ITF entry
- PR = Protected ranking
- SR = Special ranking
- SE = Special exempt
- JE = Junior exempt
- JR = Junior Accelerator Programme entrant
- CO = College Accelerator Programme entrant
- NG = Next Gen Accelerator Program entrant
- w/o = Walkover
- r = Retired
- d = Defaulted

=== Finals ===
Semifinals
(Brazil) Nauhany Vitória Leme da Silva	0	1
(France) Alice Tubello	6	6
7	(Argentina) Julia Riera	3	3
2	(Austria) Julia Grabher	6	6

Final
(France) Alice Tubello	3	7^{7}	7^{7}
2	(Austria) Julia Grabher	6	6^{5}	6^{2}

=== Top half ===
First round
1	(United Kingdom) F Jones	7	6
(Argentina) MF Urrutia	5	1
Q	(Argentina) B Bonardi	1	5
WC	(Brazil) M Souza	6	7
(Brazil) NV Leme da Silva	7	1	6
(Greece) D Papamichail	5	6	3
(Argentina) L Giovannini	7^{8}	1	6
6	(Italy) L Bronzetti	6^{6}	6	2
4	(Czech Republic) L Samson	0	4
(France) A Tubello	6	6
(Brazil) A Candiotto	2	3
Q	(Argentina) LM Cinalli	6	6
(Brazil) L Fullana	4	6^{6}
Q	(Argentina) L Ayala	6	7^{8}
(Argentina) V Bosio	5	2
8	(Argentina) J Ortenzi	7	6

Second round
1	(United Kingdom) F Jones	6	6
WC	(Brazil) M Souza	4	3
(Brazil) NV Leme da Silva	6	6
(Argentina) L Giovannini	4	4
(France) A Tubello	6	6
Q	(Argentina) LM Cinalli	4	3
Q	(Argentina) L Ayala	0	2
8	(Argentina) J Ortenzi	6	6

Quarterfinals
1	(United Kingdom) F Jones	5	0^{r}
(Brazil) NV Leme da Silva	7	0
(France) A Tubello	2	6	6
8	(Argentina) J Ortenzi	6	2	3

Semifinals
(Brazil) NV Leme da Silva	0	1
(France) A Tubello	6	6

=== Bottom half ===
First round
7	(Argentina) J Riera	1	6	6
(Switzerland) R Masarova	6	4	1
WC	(Brazil) R Pereira	1	2
(Morocco) Y Kabbaj	6	6
Q	(Chile) F Labraña	4	0
(Brazil) G Cé	6	6
(Argentina) JM González Daniele	3	1
3	(Argentina) S Sierra	6	6
5	(Spain) L Romero Gormaz	6	6
WC	(Brazil) J Konishi Camargo Silva	2	1
(Chile) A Vergara Rivera	6	6
WC	(Brazil) E Gomes	3	4
(Argentina) ML Carlé	7	6
(Brazil) L Pigossi	5	0
(Brazil) C Alves	5	6^{1}
2	(Austria) J Grabher	7	7^{7}

Second round
7	(Argentina) J Riera	6	6
(Morocco) Y Kabbaj	2	4
(Brazil) G Cé	6^{2}	6	4
3	(Argentina) S Sierra	7^{7}	3	6
5	(Spain) L Romero Gormaz	7	6
(Chile) A Vergara Rivera	5	2
(Argentina) ML Carlé	5	5
2	(Austria) J Grabher	7	7

Quarterfinals
7	(Argentina) J Riera	1	6	7
3	(Argentina) S Sierra	6	4	5
5	(Spain) L Romero Gormaz	6	4	5
2	(Austria) J Grabher	1	6	7

Semifinals
7	(Argentina) J Riera	3	3
2	(Austria) J Grabher	6	6

== Qualifying ==
=== Seeds ===
1. (Chile) Fernanda Labraña (qualified)
2. (Argentina) Berta Bonardi (qualified)
3. (Argentina) Luna María Cinalli (qualified)
4. (Argentina) Lourdes Ayala (qualified)

=== Qualifiers ===
1. (Chile) Fernanda Labraña
2. (Argentina) Berta Bonardi
3. (Argentina) Luna María Cinalli
4. (Argentina) Lourdes Ayala

=== Draw ===
==== First qualifier ====
Qualifying competition
1	(Chile) Fernanda Labraña	6	6
WC	(Brazil) Bianca Mendonça Bernardes	0	0

==== Second qualifier ====
Qualifying competition
2	(Argentina) Berta Bonardi	6	6
	(Brazil) Catarina Mellei Ibiaraba Melleiro	0	3

==== Third qualifier ====
Qualifying competition
3	(Argentina) Luna María Cinalli	6	6
	(Brazil) Jennifer Dourado	1	1

==== Fourth qualifier ====
Qualifying competition
4	(Argentina) Lourdes Ayala	7^{8}	6
WC	(Brazil) Geórgia Gulin	6^{6}	3
