= 2026 Wimbledon Championships =

- Date: 29 June – 12 July 2026
- Edition: 139th
- Category: Grand Slam (ITF)
- Draw: 128S / 64D / 32XD
- Prize money: £64,200,000
- Surface: Grass
- Location: Church Road; SW19, Wimbledon, London, United Kingdom
- Venue: All England Lawn Tennis and Croquet Club

Champions

Men's singles
- (Italy) Jannik Sinner

Women's singles
- (Czech Republic) Linda Nosková

Men's doubles
- (Finland) Harri Heliövaara / (United Kingdom) Henry Patten

Women's doubles
- (China) Guo Hanyu / (France) Kristina Mladenovic

Mixed doubles
- (El Salvador) Marcelo Arévalo / (Latvia) Jeļena Ostapenko

Wheelchair men's singles
- (Japan) Tokito Oda

Wheelchair women's singles
- (Japan) Yui Kamiji

Wheelchair quad singles
- (Netherlands) Niels Vink

Wheelchair men's doubles
- (United Kingdom) Alfie Hewett / (United Kingdom) Gordon Reid

Wheelchair women's doubles
- (Japan) Yui Kamiji / (China) Zhu Zhenzhen

Wheelchair quad doubles
- (Israel) Guy Sasson / (Netherlands) Niels Vink

Boys' singles
- (United States) Jordan Lee

Girls' singles
- Anna Pushkareva

Boys' doubles
- (Brazil) Luís Guto Miguel / (Slovenia) Žiga Šeško

Girls' doubles
- (Czech Republic) Jana Kovačková / (Czech Republic) Kateřina Zajíčková

Boys' 14&U singles
- (Switzerland) Jonas Wälti

Girls' 14&U singles
- (United States) Isha Manchala

Gentlemen's invitation doubles
- (United States) Bob Bryan / (United States) Mike Bryan

Ladies' invitation doubles
- (Slovakia) Magdaléna Rybáriková / (Czech Republic) Lucie Šafářová

Mixed invitation doubles
- (Germany) Tommy Haas / (Switzerland) Martina Hingis
- Wimbledon Championships

The 2026 Wimbledon Championships was the 139th edition of the Wimbledon Championships, a major tennis tournament, which took place at the All England Lawn Tennis and Croquet Club in Wimbledon, London, England, from 29 June to 12 July 2026, with the qualifying rounds taking place between 22 and 25 June 2026.

For the first time in Wimbledon championships history, matches had video reviews. Initially, players would only be allowed to challenge certain calls made by the chair umpires on matches at the Centre Court and No. 1 Court and on the other four show courts when they were hosting singles matches (No. 2 Court, No. 3 Court, No. 12 Court and No. 18 Court).

== Singles players ==
Key

- (#) = The number inside a parentheses indicates a player's seed
- Q = Qualifier
- WC = Wild card
- LL = Lucky loser
- PR = Protected ranking

Gentlemen's singles

Gentlemen's singles players
Champion		Runner-up	
(Italy) Jannik Sinner [1]		(Germany) Alexander Zverev [2]	
Semi-finals out
(Serbia) Novak Djokovic [7]		(United Kingdom) Arthur Fery (WC)	
Quarter-finals out
(Germany) Jan-Lennard Struff	(Canada) Félix Auger-Aliassime [3]	(Italy) Flavio Cobolli [9]	(United States) Taylor Fritz [6]
4th round out
(Japan) Shintaro Mochizuki (Q)	(Poland) Hubert Hurkacz	(Spain) Alejandro Davidovich Fokina [22]	Roman Safiullin (Q)
(Australia) Alex de Minaur [5]	(Bulgaria) Grigor Dimitrov (WC)	(Kazakhstan) Alexander Bublik [10]	(Czech Republic) Jiří Lehečka [13]
3rd round out
(United States) Jenson Brooksby	(Spain) Rafael Jódar [23]	(United States) Tommy Paul [21]	Daniil Medvedev [8]
(United States) Michael Zheng (Q)	(Hungary) Márton Fucsovics	(Brazil) João Fonseca [24]	(France) Arthur Rinderknech [25]
(United States) Zachary Svajda	Karen Khachanov [19]	(Italy) Matteo Berrettini	(Belgium) Zizou Bergs
(Italy) Lorenzo Sonego	(United States) Frances Tiafoe [17]	(Spain) Jaume Munar	(United States) Marcos Giron
2nd round out
(Portugal) Nuno Borges	(Peru) Ignacio Buse [31]	(Spain) Pablo Carreño Busta	(United States) Ethan Quinn
(Austria) Sebastian Ofner	(South Korea) Kwon Soon-woo (Q)	(United States) Brandon Nakashima [28]	(Spain) Daniel Mérida
(Croatia) Dino Prižmić	(Colombia) Nicolás Mejía (Q)	(Hungary) Fábián Marozsán	(United States) Learner Tien [16]
(Netherlands) Botic van de Zandschulp	(Netherlands) Jesper de Jong	(United States) Martin Damm	(Greece) Stefanos Tsitsipas
(France) Adrian Mannarino	(Poland) Kamil Majchrzak	(Germany) Yannick Hanfmann	(Australia) James Duckworth
(Czech Republic) Jakub Menšík [15]	(France) Arthur Fils [20]	(Portugal) Jaime Faria (Q)	(Finland) Otto Virtanen (Q)
(United States) Patrick Kypson	(Canada) Gabriel Diallo	(United Kingdom) Jan Choinski	(France) Kyrian Jacquet (Q)
(Slovakia) Alex Molčan	(United Kingdom) Jacob Fearnley (WC)	(France) Quentin Halys	(France) Valentin Royer
1st round out
(Serbia) Miomir Kecmanović	(United States) Tristan Boyer (Q)	(Australia) Aleksandar Vukic	(United States) Emilio Nava
(United Kingdom) Felix Gill (WC)	(Canada) Denis Shapovalov	(United Kingdom) Max Basing (Q)	(Italy) Luciano Darderi [14]
(Norway) Casper Ruud [11]	(Serbia) Hamad Medjedovic	(Spain) Martín Landaluce	(France) Alexandre Müller
(United Kingdom) Jack Pinnington Jones (WC)	(Argentina) Sebastián Báez	(Argentina) Camilo Ugo Carabelli	(Croatia) Marin Čilić
(Kazakhstan) Alexander Shevchenko	(Australia) Adam Walton	(Paraguay) Adolfo Daniel Vallejo	(United Kingdom) Cameron Norrie [26]
(Argentina) Juan Manuel Cerúndolo	(Argentina) Thiago Agustín Tirante	(France) Luca Van Assche	(Czech Republic) Dalibor Svrčina
Andrey Rublev [12]	(United States) Aleksandar Kovacevic	(Australia) Rinky Hijikata	(Spain) Roberto Bautista Agut
(United Kingdom) Oliver Tarvet (Q)	(Argentina) Marco Trungelliti	(France) Hugo Gaston (Q)	(China) Wu Yibing
(Argentina) Román Andrés Burruchaga	(France) Titouan Droguet	(Spain) Pablo Llamas Ruiz (LL)	(Chile) Alejandro Tabilo [30]
(United Kingdom) Billy Harris (Q)	(France) Giovanni Mpetshi Perricard	(Netherlands) Tallon Griekspoor	(Argentina) Mariano Navone
(United Kingdom) Toby Samuel (WC)	(Australia) Dane Sweeny (Q)	(Switzerland) Stan Wawrinka (WC)	(Belgium) Raphaël Collignon
(France) Ugo Humbert [27]	(Japan) Sho Shimabukuro	(Bosnia and Herzegovina) Damir Džumhur	(United States) Ben Shelton [4]
(Serbia) Dušan Lajović (LL)	(United States) Mackenzie McDonald (Q)	(France) Benjamin Bonzi	(Argentina) Tomás Martín Etcheverry [29]
(France) Térence Atmane	(Czech Republic) Vít Kopřiva	(Lithuania) Vilius Gaubas (Q)	(Australia) Thanasi Kokkinakis (PR)
(Australia) Alexei Popyrin	(Germany) Daniel Altmaier	(United States) Alex Michelsen	(Argentina) Francisco Cerúndolo [18]
(Italy) Matteo Arnaldi [32]	(France) Corentin Moutet	(United Kingdom) Harry Wendelken (WC)	(Belgium) Alexander Blockx

Ladies' singles

Ladies' singles players
Champion		Runner-up	
(Czech Republic) Linda Nosková [9]		(Czech Republic) Karolína Muchová [10]	
Semi-finals out
(United States) Coco Gauff [7]		(Ukraine) Marta Kostyuk [12]	
Quarter-finals out
(Japan) Naomi Osaka [14]	(United States) Jessica Pegula [4]	(Italy) Jasmine Paolini [13]	(Belgium) Elise Mertens [25]
4th round out
Aryna Sabalenka [1]	(Czech Republic) Barbora Krejčíková	(United States) Iva Jovic [16]	(Switzerland) Belinda Bencic [11]
(United States) Ashlyn Krueger (Q)	(Philippines) Alexandra Eala [29]	(United States) Madison Keys [26]	(Czech Republic) Marie Bouzková [21]
3rd round out
(Latvia) Jeļena Ostapenko	(Australia) Daria Kasatkina	(Thailand) Mananchaya Sawangkaew (Q)	(Czech Republic) Nikola Bartůňková
(Spain) Jéssica Bouzas Maneiro	Ekaterina Alexandrova [18]	Anna Kalinskaya [19]	(United States) Claire Liu (Q)
(Ukraine) Daria Snigur	(United States) Emma Navarro [23]	(Greece) Maria Sakkari	(Poland) Iga Świątek [3]
(United States) Amanda Anisimova [6]	(Romania) Sorana Cîrstea [17]	Liudmila Samsonova	(Kazakhstan) Elena Rybakina [2]
2nd round out
(United States) McCartney Kessler	(Croatia) Antonia Ružić	(Indonesia) Janice Tjen	Anastasia Gasanova (Q)
(China) Zhang Shuai	(United States) Alycia Parks	(Czech Republic) Kateřina Siniaková [32]	Mirra Andreeva [5]
(Spain) Sara Sorribes Tormo (PR)	(Ukraine) Dayana Yastremska	(Thailand) Lanlana Tararudee	(Germany) Tatjana Maria
(China) Wang Xinyu	(France) Diane Parry	(Turkey) Zeynep Sönmez	(Argentina) Solana Sierra
(France) Léolia Jeanjean (Q)	(Georgia (country)) Mariam Bolkvadze (Q)	(Spain) Oksana Selekhmeteva	Anna Blinkova
(Switzerland) Viktorija Golubic	(Uzbekistan) Kamilla Rakhimova	(Australia) Maya Joint	(Czech Republic) Karolína Plíšková (PR)
(United States) Sofia Kenin	(United Kingdom) Katie Swan (WC)	(Australia) Kimberly Birrell	(Colombia) Camila Osorio
Diana Shnaider [15]	(Italy) Tyra Caterina Grant (Q)	(Uzbekistan) Maria Timofeeva (Q)	(United States) Caty McNally
1st round out
(Serbia) Teodora Kostović (Q)	(Ukraine) Oleksandra Oliynykova	(United Kingdom) Harriet Dart (WC)	(Latvia) Darja Semeņistaja (LL)
(Canada) Leylah Fernandez [22]	(United Kingdom) Mimi Xu (WC)	(Colombia) Emiliana Arango	(France) Elsa Jacquemot
Anastasia Zakharova	(Canada) Bianca Andreescu (Q)	(United Kingdom) Alicia Dudeney (WC)	(Poland) Maja Chwalińska [20]/(WC)
(China) Zheng Qinwen	(United States) Peyton Stearns	(United Kingdom) Hannah Klugman (WC)	(Poland) Magda Linette
(Czech Republic) Darja Vidmanova	(Andorra) Victoria Jiménez Kasintseva	(Japan) Aoi Ito (PR)	(Austria) Anastasia Potapova [27]
(Hungary) Panna Udvardy	(Austria) Lilli Tagger	(Kazakhstan) Yulia Putintseva	(Romania) Jaqueline Cristian
(United Kingdom) Mika Stojsavljevic (WC)	(Italy) Elisabetta Cocciaretto	(United Kingdom) Francesca Jones	(Poland) Magdalena Fręch
(United States) Ann Li [28]	(Belgium) Hanne Vandewinkel	(Hungary) Anna Bondár	(Germany) Tamara Korpatsch
(Ukraine) Elina Svitolina [8]	(Slovenia) Veronika Erjavec	(Australia) Ajla Tomljanović	(Croatia) Donna Vekić [31]
(Spain) Paula Badosa	(Austria) Sinja Kraus	(Ukraine) Yuliia Starodubtseva	(Argentina) Nadia Podoroska (PR)
(United States) Robin Montgomery (Q)	Iryna Shymanovich (Q)	(Ukraine) Anhelina Kalinina	(Denmark) Clara Tauson [24]
(Mexico) Renata Zarazúa	(United States) Serena Williams (WC)	(Czech Republic) Tereza Valentová	(United States) Taylor Townsend
(North Macedonia) Lina Gjorcheska (Q)	(Croatia) Petra Marčinko	(Romania) Irina-Camelia Begu (PR)	(United States) Kayla Day (Q)
(Czech Republic) Sára Bejlek	Alina Korneeva (Q)	(Switzerland) Simona Waltert	(Germany) Ella Seidel
(Germany) Eva Lys	(Uzbekistan) Polina Kudermetova (Q)	(United Kingdom) Katie Boulter	(Australia) Talia Gibson
(Germany) Laura Siegemund	(Brazil) Beatriz Haddad Maia	(Romania) Elena-Gabriela Ruse	(France) Loïs Boisson

== Events ==
=== Gentlemen's singles ===
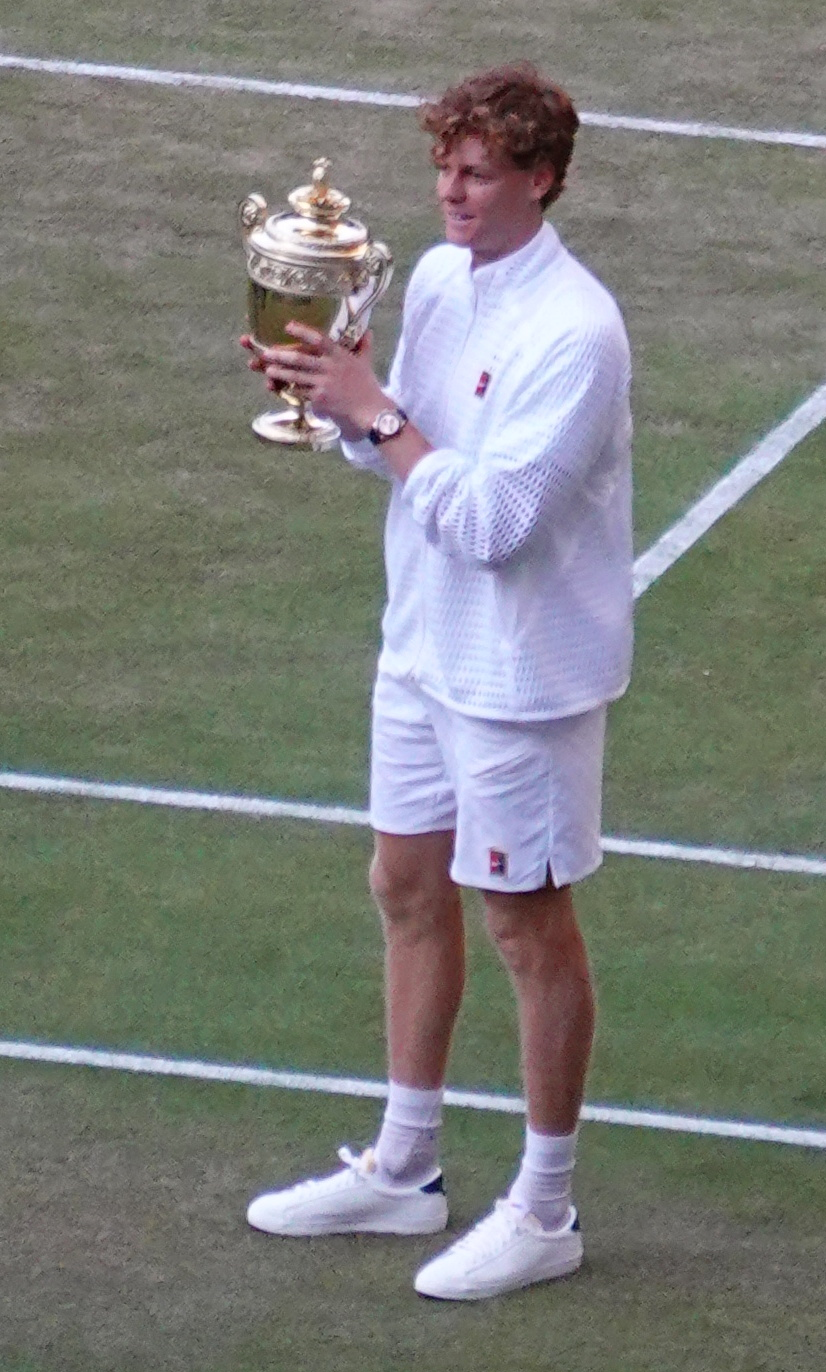
Jannik Sinner carrying the gentlemen's singles trophy after defeating Alexander Zverev in four sets in the event final

- (Italy) Jannik Sinner defeated (Germany) Alexander Zverev 6–7^{(7–9)}, 7–6^{(7–2)}, 6–3, 6–4

The Gentlemen's singles event began on 29 June with the first of seven total rounds. Thirty-two players were seeded. Of those seeded players, ten were defeated in the first round, notably No. 4 Ben Shelton, No. 11 Casper Ruud, and No. 12 Andrey Rublev. With his first-round victory, Novak Djokovic continued a 21-year-long streak of having never lost in the opening round of Wimbledon, and became the first player in the Open Era to win more than 80 opening-round matches at the majors. Jakub Menšík, Learner Tien, and Arthur Fils were the highest of the five seeded players to exit in the second round, and a further seven seeded players were defeated in the third round, notably No. 8 Daniil Medvedev, No. 17 Frances Tiafoe, and No. 19 Karen Khachanov. Alex de Minaur, Alexander Bublik, Jiří Lehečka were the highest of the four seeded players who were defeated in the Round of 16. Aged 36 years, 71 days, Jan-Lennard Struff became the oldest first-time quarterfinalist at a major in the Open Era. After his win in the fourth round, Djokovic surpassed Roger Federer's record of Wimbledon men's singles match wins, reaching 106.

In the quarterfinals, defending champion Jannik Sinner defeated Struff in straight sets. No. 7 Djokovic won his match against No. 3 Félix Auger-Aliassime in five sets, the longest quarterfinal in tournament history, at 5 hours and 15 minutes long. At 39 years, 49 days old, Djokovic was the second-oldest Wimbledon semi-finalist in the Open Era, only behind Ken Rosewall in 1974 (aged 39 years, 243 days). Arthur Fery, a wildcard, defeated No. 9 Flavio Cobolli in straight sets, becoming the second wildcard to reach the Wimbledon semi-finals in the Open Era, after Goran Ivanišević in 2001, and the first British male wildcard to do so at any major in the Open Era. No. 2 Alexander Zverev advanced to the semi-finals after winning against No. 6 Taylor Fritz. The first semi-final was played between second seed Zverev and wildcard Fery. Zverev won the match in four sets and reached his first Wimbledon final. Zverev was the first man born in the 1990s to reach the final of all four majors, and the first German man to contest the final since Boris Becker in 1995. In the second semi-final, Sinner defeated Djokovic in straight sets.

In the final match, Zverev won the first set in a tie-breaker, but Sinner would win the following three sets to win his second consecutive Wimbledon title and fifth major title overall.

=== Ladies' singles ===
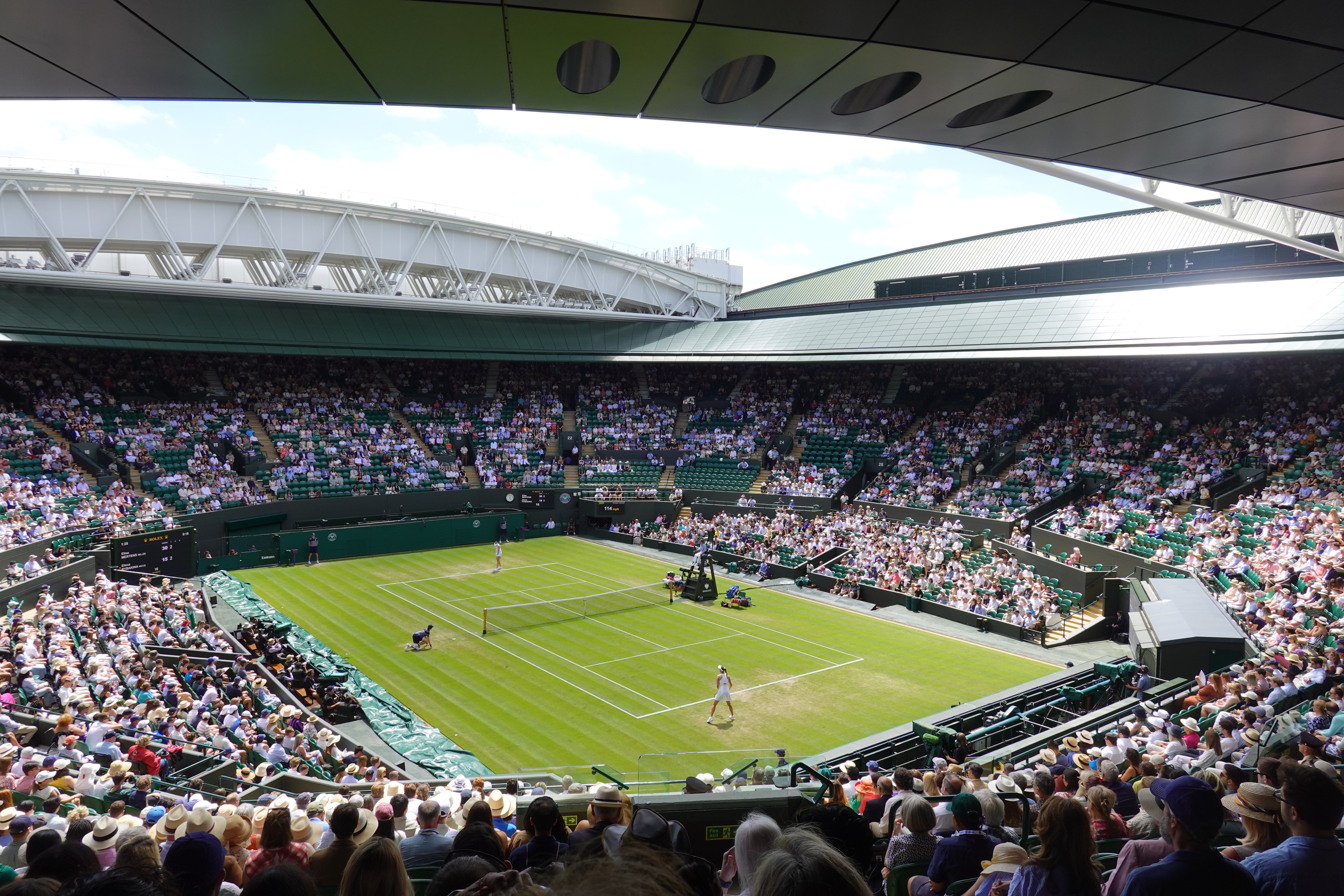
Elena Rybakina and Elise Mertens at the 2026 Wimbledon Championships

- (Czech Republic) Linda Nosková defeated (Czech Republic) Karolína Muchová 6–2, 5–7, 6–3

The Ladies' singles event began on 29 June with the first of seven total rounds. Thirty-two players were seeded. This tournament marked the singles return of former world No. 1 and 23-time major champion Serena Williams, who last played at the 2022 US Open. She lost in the first round to Maya Joint. Maja Chwalińska was the third player in the Open Era to be seeded at a major while also being entered as a wildcard, following Martina Hingis at the 2002 US Open and Patty Schnyder at the 2004 Wimbledon Championships. Lina Gjorcheska became the first player from North Macedonia to compete in a major main draw. Seven seeded players lost in the first round, most notably the No. 8 seed Elina Svitolina. Three more seeded players fell in the second round, including No. 5 Mirra Andreeva and No. 15 Diana Shnaider. Seven seeded players lost in the third round, most notable of them being defending champion Iga Świątek, No. 2 Elena Rybakina, and No. 6 Amanda Anisimova. Świątek lost to Alexandra Eala, who became the first Filipina player in the Open Era to reach the third and fourth rounds of a major. Six other seeded players lost their fourth round matches, including the singles' world No. 1, Aryna Sabalenka. Sabalenka's fourth-round defeat to Naomi Osaka marked the first time she failed to reach the quarterfinals of a major since the 2022 French Open, and her first straight-sets defeat at a major since the 2020 US Open.

In the quarterfinals, No. 10 Karolína Muchová defeated No. 14 Osaka in straight sets. No. 12 Marta Kostyuk won in straight sets against No. 13 Jasmine Paolini. No. 9 Linda Nosková was victorious in straight sets against No. 25 Elise Mertens. No. 7 Coco Gauff pulled an upset against No. 4 Jessica Pegula after fighting back and winning the match in three sets. In the first semi-final, Muchová met Gauff. Muchová won the tie-breaker 12–10 in the third set to reach her first Wimbledon final. In the second semi-final match, Nosková defeated Kostyuk in the straight sets to reach her first Wimbledon final.

In the final match, Nosková defeated Muchová after saving a match point (in the third round against Sorana Cîrstea) en route to her first major title and third career WTA Tour title overall. Aged 21 years and 236 days old, Nosková was the youngest Wimbledon champion since Petra Kvitová in 2011. The Czech Republic became the sixth country in the Open Era to have two countrywomen contest a major singles final.

=== Gentlemen's doubles ===
- (Finland) Harri Heliövaara / (United Kingdom) Henry Patten defeated (El Salvador) Marcelo Arévalo / (Croatia) Mate Pavić 7–6^{(7–4)}, 7–6^{(7–3)}

The Gentlemen's doubles event began on 1 July with the first of six total rounds. Sixteen teams were seeded. In the first round, two seeded pairs lost; the highest seeded of them was No. 15 Sander Arends and David Pel. Four seeded teams lost in the second round, including No. 2 Marcel Granollers and Horacio Zeballos. In third round, three seeded teams lost, the highest of them being No. 4 Simone Bolelli and Andrea Vavassori.

In the quarterfinals, the top-seeded pair of Harri Heliövaara and Henry Patten defeated 8th seeds Guido Andreozzi and Manuel Guinard in three sets. Unseeded pair of Thanasi Kokkinakis and Aleksandar Kovacevic defeated No. 14 pair of Austin Krajicek and Nikola Mektić. No. 6 pair of Marcelo Arévalo and Mate Pavić won against defending champions Julian Cash and Lloyd Glasspool. No. 7 pair of Kevin Krawietz and Tim Pütz defeated 13th seeds Sadio Doumbia and Fabien Reboul. In the semi-finals, Arévalo and Pavić defeated Krawietz and Pütz, while Heliövaara and Patten won against Kokkinakis and Kovacevic. Heliövaara and Patten defeated Arévalo and Pavić in the final. Patten became the first British player to win the title twice in the Open Era.

=== Ladies' doubles ===
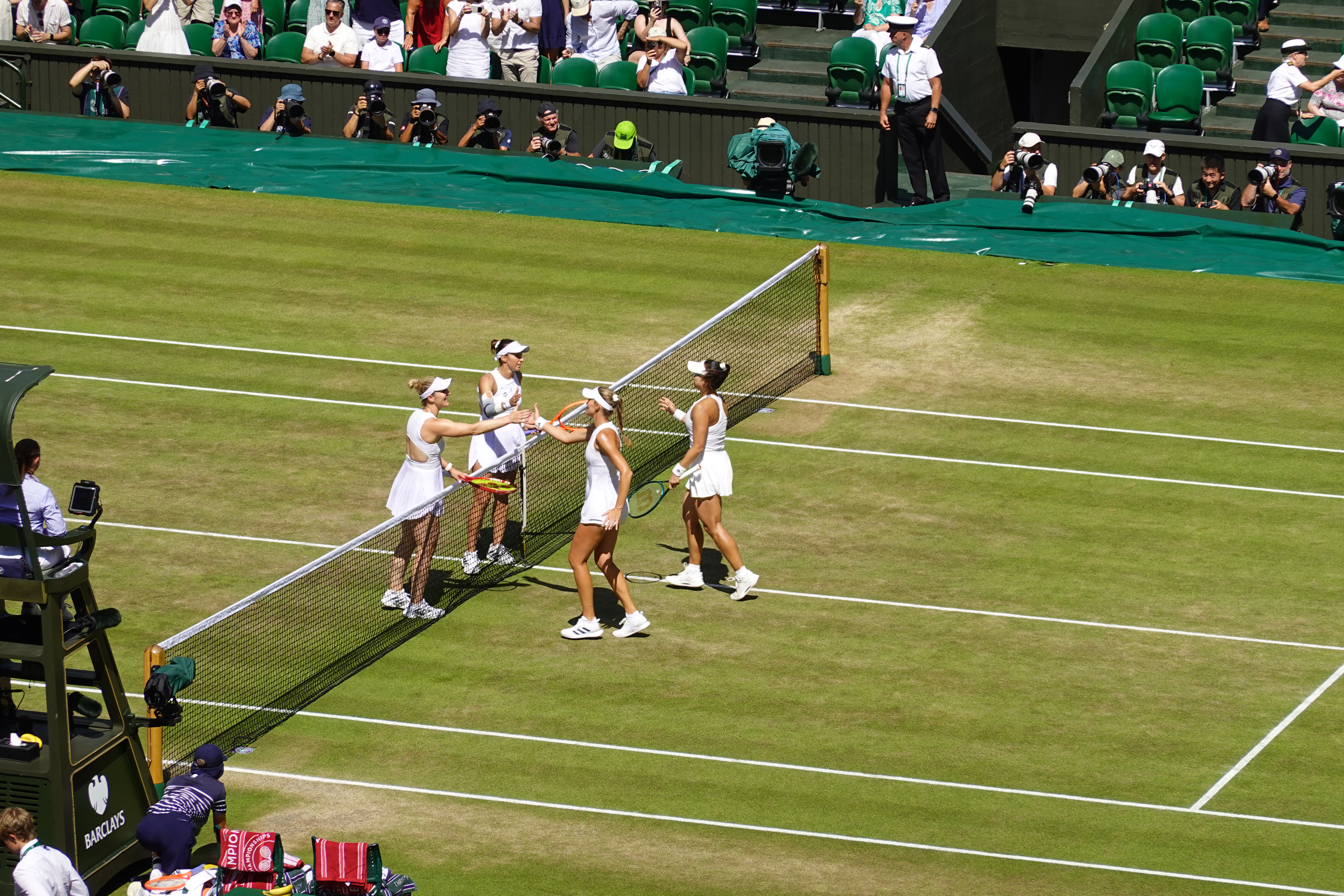
Guo Hanyu and Kristina Mladenovic (right) defeated Gabriela Dabrowski and Luisa Stefani (left) in the ladies' doubles final.

- (China) Guo Hanyu / (France) Kristina Mladenovic defeated (Canada) Gabriela Dabrowski / (Brazil) Luisa Stefani 6–3, 7–5

The Ladies' doubles event began on 2 July with the first of six total rounds. Sixteen teams were seeded. Only two seeded teams were eliminated in the first round: No.5 Nicole Melichar-Martinez and Erin Routliffe and No. 12 Tereza Mihalíková and Olivia Nicholls. The second round saw the loss of four seeded pairs, including fourth seeds Elise Mertens and Zhang Shuai, who was the defending champion. A further four pairs fell in the third round; the highest of them being No. 3 Anna Danilina and Aleksandra Krunić.

In the quarterfinals, second seeds Gabriela Dabrowski and Luisa Stefani defeated unseeded pair of Katarzyna Piter and Anna Sisková. No. 13 Shuko Aoyama and Liang En-shuo won against Ellen Perez and Demi Schuurs. Tenth seeds Guo Hanyu and Kristina Mladenovic eliminated first seeds Kateřina Siniaková and Taylor Townsend. The unseeded pair of Jiang Xinyu and Xu Yifan advanced to the semi-finals after defeating unseeded pair of Ingrid Neel and Giuliana Olmos. In the first semi-final, No. 2 Dabrowski and Stefani defeated No. 13 Aoyama and En-shuo, while in the second semi-final, No. 10 Guo and Mladenovic won against unseeded pair of Xinyu and Yifan. tenth seeds Guo and Mladenovic defeated second seeds Dabrowski and Stefani in the final. It was Guo's first major title and Mladenovic's tenth.

=== Mixed doubles ===
- (El Salvador) Marcelo Arévalo / (Latvia) Jeļena Ostapenko defeated (Australia) Marc Polmans / (Australia) Storm Hunter 4–6, 7–5, 6–2

The Mixed doubles event began on 3 July with the first of five total rounds. Eight teams were seeded. Two seeded teams lost in the first round, including four seeds Henry Patten and Olivia Nicholls. In the second round, two seeded teams were eliminated, including the top seeded team Andrea Vavassori and Sara Errani. Neal Skupski and Desirae Krawczyk were the only seeded pair to lose their quarterfinals match. In the semi-finals, No. 2 Marcelo Arévalo and Jeļena Ostapenko defeated No. 3 Christian Harrison and Zhang Shuai, while Marc Polmans and Storm Hunter defeated Mate Pavić and Fanny Stollár. Arévalo and Ostapenko defeated Polmans and Storm Hunter in the final to win the title. Arévalo became the first Salvadoran player to win a Wimbledon title. Ostapenko was the seventh female player in the past 60 years to win major titles in singles, doubles, and mixed doubles.

=== Wheelchair gentlemen's singles ===
- (Japan) Tokito Oda defeated (United Kingdom) Alfie Hewett 6–1, 6–1

The Wheelchair gentlemen's singles event began on 7 July with the Round of 16. The field was composed of 16 players with 4 seeded players. All four seeded players won their first round and quarterfinals matches. In the semi-finals, defending champion Tokito Oda defeated No. 3 Martín de la Puente, while No. 2 Alfie Hewett defeated No. 3 Gustavo Fernández. Oda defeated Hewett in a rematch of the previous year's final to win the title. It was his third Wimbledon singles title and tenth major singles title overall.

=== Wheelchair ladies' singles ===
- (Japan) Yui Kamiji defeated (Netherlands) Diede de Groot 6–0, 6–0

The Wheelchair ladies' singles event began on 7 July with the Round of 16. The field was composed of 16 players with 4 seeded players. All seeded players won their first round and quarterfinals matches. Defending champion Wang Ziying lost in the semi-finals to No. 1 Yui Kamiji, a rematch of the previous year's final. Meanwhile, No. 2 Diede de Groot defeated No. 3 Li Xiaohui. In the final, Kamiji defeated de Groot with a double bagel. It was her first Wimbledon singles title and twelfth major singles title overall, completing the career Golden Slam.

=== Wheelchair quad singles ===
- (Netherlands) Niels Vink defeated (Netherlands) Sam Schröder 6–1, 6–3

The wheelchair quad singles tournament began on 8 July with the quarterfinal round. The field was composed of eight players; defending champion Niels Vink and Sam Schröder received the top two seeds and the other six players were unseeded. In the opening round, all the winners won their matches in straight sets. In the semi-finals, unseeded Andy Lapthorne lost to Schröder in straight sets, while Vink also won his match against Guy Sasson in straight sets. Vink successfully defended his title by winning the final match against Schröder. It was his fifth consecutive major singles title and tenth overall. It was Schröder's fourth consecutive runner-up finish at the majors.

=== Wheelchair gentlemen's doubles ===
- (United Kingdom) Alfie Hewett / (United Kingdom) Gordon Reid defeated (Argentina) Gustavo Fernández / (Japan) Tokito Oda 2–6, 6–1, 6–2

The wheelchair gentlemen's doubles competition featured the same 16 players that contested the singles event. Two of the eight pairs were seeded: Alfie Hewett and Gordon Reid received the top seed, and defending champions Martín de la Puente and Ruben Spaargaren received the second seed. Both seeded teams won in the quarterfinals, but defending champions de la Puente and Spaargaren were the only seeded team to lose in the semi-finals, losing to Gustavo Fernández and Tokito Oda in straight sets. In the final, No. 1 Hewett and Reid defeated the unseeded pair of Fernández and Oda in three sets.

=== Wheelchair ladies' doubles ===
- (Japan) Yui Kamiji / (China) Zhu Zhenzhen defeated (China) Li Xiaohui / (China) Wang Ziying 6–4, 7–5

As with the gentlemen's competition, the wheelchair ladies' doubles event featured the same 16 players as in the singles event. Two of the eight pairs were seeded: Yui Kamiji and Zhu Zhenzhen received the top seed, and the second seed went to the defending champions Li Xiaohui and Wang Ziying. Both seeded teams won their quarterfinal and semi-final matches. Kamiji and Zhenzhen won the title by defeating the defending champions in the final.

=== Wheelchair quad doubles ===
- (Israel) Guy Sasson / (Netherlands) Niels Vink defeated (Netherlands) Sam Schröder / (Australia) Jin Woodman 6–2, 6–1

The wheelchair quad doubles tournament began on 9 July with the semi-final round. The field was composed of four pairs, consisting of eight players that played the singles event. Both seeded pairs, No. 1 defending champions Guy Sasson and Niels Vink and No. 2 Sam Schröder and Jin Woodman, won their semi-final matches. Sasson and Vink successfully defended the title by defeating Schröder and Woodman in the final.

=== Boys' singles ===
- (United States) Jordan Lee defeated (Australia) Cruz Hewitt 4–6, 6–4, 7–5

By qualifying for the main draw, Oluwaseun Peter Ogunsakin became the first Nigerian junior player to qualify for the main event of a junior Grand Slam tournament. He was eliminated in the first round after losing to wildcard Oliver Page. Of the sixteen seeded players, only two made it through the first four rounds and into the semi-finals: No. 9 Dimitar Kisimov and No. 11 Thijs Boogaard. In the quarterfinals, No. 9 Kisimov was eliminated after losing to Page in straight sets. In the semi-finals, qualifier Jordan Lee defeated unseeded Vincent Reisach in straight sets, while unseeded Cruz Hewitt defeated No. 11 Boogaard. Lee defeated Hewitt in the final, becoming the first qualifier to win the boys' singles title since Noah Rubin in 2014. He was also the first person born in the 2010s to win the boys' title.

=== Girls' singles ===
- Anna Pushkareva defeated (China) Sun Xinran 5–7, 6–3, 6–4

Of the sixteen seeded players, only four made it through the first three rounds and into the quarterfinals. No. 7 Mariia Makarova was the only seeded player to lose in the quarterfinals after losing to No. 15 Polina Skliar. In the semi-finals, No. 1 Sun Xinran defeated unseeded Janae Preston, while No. 14 Anna Pushkareva defeated Skliar. Pushkareva defeated Sun in three sets in the final.

=== Boys' doubles ===
- (Brazil) Luís Guto Miguel / (Slovenia) Žiga Šeško defeated (United States) Michael Antonius / (United States) Andrew Johnson 6–1, 6–4

Of the eight seeded pairs, only two made it into the semi-finals; both advanced to the final. Luís Guto Miguel and Žiga Šeško defeated Michael Antonius and Andrew Johnson in straight sets to win the title.

=== Girls' doubles ===
- (Czech Republic) Jana Kovačková / (Czech Republic) Kateřina Zajíčková defeated (Brazil) Victoria Luiza Barros / (Brazil) Nauhany Vitória Leme da Silva 7–6^{(9–7)}, 6–7^{(5–7)}, [10–6]

Of the eight seeded pairs, three qualified for the semi-final round. In the semi-finals, No. 1 Victoria Luiza Barros and Nauhany Vitória Leme da Silva defeated the unseeded pair of Polina Berezina and Anastasija Cvetković, while No. 5 Jana Kovačková and Kateřina Zajíčková defeated No. 8 Ida Wobker and Denisa Žoldáková. Kovačková and Zajíčková defeated Barros and Leme da Silva in the final to win the title. With this title, Kovačková completed the non-calendar year Grand Slam in girls' doubles, having previously won the 2025 US Open and the 2026 Australian and French Opens.

=== Boys' 14&U singles ===
- (Switzerland) Jonas Wälti defeated (Japan) Lyoma Hotelier 3–6, 6–1, [10–6]

The Boys 14&Under events were played in a round-robin format, under which 16 players were divided into four groups with group leaders advancing into the semi-finals. Jonas Wälti and Lyoma Hotelier reached the final by defeating Novak Palombo and Noah Honsberger in the semi-finals, respectively. Wälti claimed the title by defeating Hotelier in the final.

=== Girls' 14&U singles ===
- (United States) Isha Manchala defeated (Ukraine) Mariia Kocherzhenko 7–5, 2–6, [10–8]

The Girls 14&Under events were played in a round-robin format, under which 16 players were divided into four groups with group leaders advancing into the semi-finals. In the semi-finals, Isha Manchala and Mariia Kocherzhenko reached the final by defeating Lyubov Pronenko and Eduarda Gomes in the semi-finals, respectively. Manchala won the championship by defeating Kocherzhenko in the final.

=== Gentlemen's invitation doubles ===
- (United States) Bob Bryan / (United States) Mike Bryan defeated (United Kingdom) Jamie Murray / (Brazil) Bruno Soares 6–4, 7–6^{(7–1)}

Sixteen former professional tennis players competed in a round-robin stage in pairs of two distributed over two groups. The winners of each group faced each other in the final. At the conclusion of the group stage, Jamie Murray and Bruno Soares from Group A and defending champions Bob Bryan and Mike Bryan from Group B, advanced into the final, respectively. The defending champions successfully defended their title.

=== Ladies' invitation doubles ===
- (Slovakia) Magdaléna Rybáriková / (Czech Republic) Lucie Šafářová defeated (Slovakia) Dominika Cibulková / (Czech Republic) Barbora Strýcová 6–2, 6–3

Sixteen former professional tennis players competed in a round-robin stage in pairs of two distributed over two groups. The winners of each group faced each other in the final. At the conclusion of the group stage, Dominika Cibulková and Barbora Strýcová from Group A and Magdaléna Rybáriková and Lucie Šafářová from Group B, advanced into the final, respectively. Rybáriková and Šafářová defeated Cibulková and Strýcová in the final to win the title.

=== Mixed invitation doubles ===
- (Germany) Tommy Haas / (Switzerland) Martina Hingis defeated (Australia) Mark Philippoussis / (Zimbabwe) Cara Black 6–3, 6–4

Sixteen former professional tennis players competed in a round-robin stage in pairs of two distributed over two groups. The winners of each group faced each other in the final. At the conclusion of the group stage, Tommy Haas and Martina Hingis from Group A, Mark Philippoussis and Cara Black from group B, advanced into the final, respectively. Haas and Hingis claimed the title by winning the final.

== Point and prize money distribution ==
=== Point distribution ===
Below are the tables with the point distribution for each phase of the tournament.

==== Senior points ====
Points distribution for senior events
Event	W	F	SF	QF	Round of 16	Round of 32	Round of 64	Round of 128	Q	Q3	Q2	Q1
Men's singles	2000	1300	800	400	200	100	50	10	30	16	8	0
Men's doubles	2000	1200	720	360	180	90	0	—N/a				
Women's singles	2000	1300	780	430	240	130	70	10	40	30	20	2
Women's doubles	2000	1300	780	430	240	130	10	—N/a				

==== Wheelchair points ====
Point distribution for wheelchair events
Event	W	F	SF	QF	Round of 16
Singles	1,200	780	480	240	120
Doubles	1,200	780	480	120	—N/a
Quad singles	1,200	780	480	120	—N/a

==== Junior points ====
Points distribution for junior events
Event	W	F	SF	QF	Round of 16	Round of 32
Boys' singles	1000	700	490	300	180	90
Girls' singles	1000	700	490	300	180	90
Boys' doubles	750	525	367	225	135	—N/a
Girls' doubles	750	525	367	225	135	—N/a

=== Prize money ===
The Wimbledon Championships total prize money for 2026 was £64,200,000, an increase of 20.0% from the previous year's edition and the largest year-on-year increase in the tournament's history.

The men's and women's singles champions each received £3,600,000, a 20.0% increase from the £3,000,000 awarded the previous year, while runners-up received £1,800,000, an increase of 18.4%. First-round losers received £80,000, a 21.2% increase compared to the previous year.

List of monetary prizes
Edition 2026	W	F	SF	QF	Round of 16	Round of 32	Round of 64	Round of 128	Q3	Q2	Q1
Singles	£3,600,000	£1,800,000	£900,000	£480,000	£300,000	£185,000	£126,000	£80,000	£50,000	£32,000	£20,000
Doubles *	£760,000	£380,000	£190,000	£95,000	£48,000	£29,000	£18,000	—N/a			
Mixed Doubles *	£148,000	£74,000	£37,000	£19,000	£10,000	£5,200	—N/a				
Wheelchair Singles	£82,000	£43,000	£29,000	£20,000	£12,800	—N/a					
Wheelchair Doubles *	£36,000	£18,000	£11,000	£6,500	—N/a						
Quad Singles	£82,000	£43,000	£29,000	£20,000	—N/a						
Quad Doubles *	£36,000	£18,000	£11,000	—N/a							
Edition 2026	W	F	Group stage								
Invitation Doubles *	£35,000	£28,000	£24,000								

* per team

== The Wimbledon Court in Central Park ==
In June 2026, the All England Lawn Tennis and Croquet Club organised "The Wimbledon Court in Central Park", a four-day promotional event which was held at the Wollman Rink in Central Park, New York City, from 26 to 29 June. The event formed part of Wimbledon's annual outreach activities in the United States, following the "The Hill in New York" event, which has been staged annually since 2022.

For the first time, the venue was transformed into a temporary grass court constructed and maintained by Wimbledon's groundstaff. The centrepiece of the event was "The Wimbledon Court Invitational", an exhibition doubles match featuring former professional players and tennis personalities, which was held on 26 June.

On 27 and 28 June, members of the public were given the opportunity to play on the grass court through a ballot system. The event also featured tennis clinics, interactive activities, and Wimbledon-themed hospitality, including traditional strawberries and cream, Pimm's, and Champagne.

As part of Wimbledon's community engagement initiatives, a tennis session was held on 29 June for participants of the Barclays Net Work programme, a youth employment and skills initiative operating in the Bronx in partnership with Good Shepherd Services. The programme supports young people aged 15–24 who are unemployed, disconnected from education, or have experience with the justice system.

The event was concluded with a public screening of the opening day's play from the 2026 Wimbledon Championships, broadcast live on giant screens in Central Park. According to the All England Club, the initiative is intended to provide American tennis fans with an opportunity to experience elements of Wimbledon's traditions and atmosphere outside the United Kingdom.

Preceded by 2025 Wimbledon Championships	Wimbledon Championships	Succeeded by 2027 Wimbledon Championships
Preceded by 2026 French Open	Grand Slam events	Succeeded by 2026 US Open
