= 2024 Porto Women's Indoor ITF 3 =

Tennis tournament

- Date: 19–25 February 2024
- Edition: 7th
- Category: ITF Women's World Tennis Tour
- Prize money: $60,000
- Surface: Hard / Indoor
- Location: Porto, Portugal

Champions

Singles
- (Hungary) Anna Bondár

Doubles
- (Hungary) Anna Bondár / (Switzerland) Céline Naef
← 2024 ·	Porto Women's Indoor ITF	· 2025 →

The 2024 Porto Women's Indoor ITF 3 was a professional tennis tournament played on indoor hard courts. It was the seventh edition of the tournament, which was part of the 2024 ITF Women's World Tennis Tour. It took place in Porto, Portugal, between 19 and 25 February 2024.

== Champions ==
=== Singles ===
- (Hungary) Anna Bondár def. (Germany) Noma Noha Akugue, 7–6^{(7–4)}, 6–2

=== Doubles ===
- (Hungary) Anna Bondár / (Switzerland) Céline Naef def. (Portugal) Francisca Jorge / (Portugal) Matilde Jorge, 6–4, 3–6, [11–9]

== Singles main draw entrants ==
=== Seeds ===
Country	Player	Rank	Seed
ESP	Marina Bassols Ribera	110	1
HUN	Anna Bondár	121	2
UKR	Daria Snigur	136	3
GER	Anna-Lena Friedsam	151	4
ROU	Elena-Gabriela Ruse	153	5
GER	Ella Seidel	158	6
HUN	Panna Udvardy	161	7
UKR	Katarina Zavatska	171	8

- Rankings are as of 12 February 2024.

=== Other entrants ===
The following players received wildcards into the singles main draw:

- (Spain) Celia Cerviño Ruiz
- (Portugal) Lena Couto
- (Portugal) Elizabet Hamaliy
- (Portugal) Matilde Jorge

The following players received entry from the qualifying draw:

- (Switzerland) Susan Bandecchi
- (France) Loïs Boisson
- (Australia) Talia Gibson
- (Netherlands) Anouk Koevermans
- (Serbia) Mia Ristić
- (United States) Anna Rogers
- (Spain) Leyre Romero Gormaz
- (Liechtenstein) Kathinka von Deichmann

The following player received entry as a lucky loser:

- (France) Amandine Hesse
