= Banana Bowl =

Annual junior tennis tournament in Brazil

Tournament information
- Founded: 1969
- Location: Various (1969–2024), Gaspar – 18s (2025–present), São José do Rio Preto – U16 & U14 (2026); Brazil
- Venue: Various, Bela Vista Country Club – 18s (2025–present), Monte Líbano Club – U16 & U14 (2026)
- Category: ITF Junior Grade A
- Surface: Clay court - outdoors
- Draw: 64S / 64Q / 32D
- Website: bananabowl.com.br

Current champions (2026)
- Singles: (Argentina) Dante Pagani - Boys 18s (Brazil) Nauhany L. da Silva - Girls 18s
- Doubles: (Slovakia) Marko Bekeni (Slovakia) Leon Sloboda - Boys 18s (Romania) Maia Ilinca Burcescu (Jamaica) Alyssa James - Girls 18s

The Banana Bowl is a junior tennis tournament that is part of the ITF Junior Circuit and the South American Tennis Confederation (COSAT) series, established in 1969 in the city of São Paulo.

The tournament was previously classified as a Grade A event—the highest level in junior tennis—until 2007, and is currently held as a J500 (formerly Grade 1) event, the second-highest classification within the ITF. It features multiple age categories, including under-18, under-16, and under-14 divisions. Established in São Paulo, the tournament does not have a fixed venue and has been hosted in various Brazilian cities, including Ribeirão Preto, Santos, São José dos Campos, and São José do Rio Preto in the São Paulo state, as well as Blumenau, Florianópolis, Gaspar, and Itajaí in the Santa Catarina state.

Since its inaugural edition in 1969, the event has only been canceled once, in 1993, due to financial difficulties faced by the Brazilian Tennis Confederation.

== History ==
The Banana Bowl was inaugurated in 1968, during the South American Championship congress in Caracas, Venezuela. The name "Banana" was suggested by Alcides Procópio, then president of the São Paulo Tennis Federation, who wanted to create a tropical version of the Orange Bowl. "Since we copy everything from the United States and they have the Orange Bowl, we will have the Banana Bowl," said Procópio in 1998, reminiscing about the creation of the event. The name was initially considered unusual, but the tournament gradually gained acceptance.

The first edition was held at the Esporte Clube Pinheiros in São Paulo, with players from Brazil and South America, with the first champions being Argentine Roberto Graetz and Brazilian Marlene Flues in the main category (under 18). Until 1973, only the Juvenile (under 18) and Infanto-Juvenile (under 15) categories were contested and only South Americans participated, but by 1976, the first Mexicans and Americans showed up. As the competition gained strength, several players who would later achieve success began to participate, such as John McEnroe, Ivan Lendl, Gabriela Sabatini, and Gustavo Kuerten.

The tournament has a list of champions who became major names in world tennis, such as John McEnroe, Thomas Muster, and Andy Roddick in the men's category, and Helena Sukova, Svetlana Kuznetsova, and Eugenie Bouchard in the women's category. But it also featured many players who didn’t make a significant impact at the time but later became stars, like Yannick Noah, Juan Martín del Potro, Jo-Wilfried Tsonga, Kei Nishikori, Fabio Fognini, Marcelo Melo, David Goffin, Amélie Mauresmo, Marion Bartoli, Ana Ivanovic, Dominika Cibulkova, Beatriz Haddad Maia and others.

== Editions ==
In 2015, at the 45th edition, Orlando Luz became the first player to win back-to-back titles in the boys' singles category, defeating Igor Marcondes in the final. It was the second consecutive year that two Brazilian players contested the boys' final. In the girls' singles, American player Usue Maitane Arconada won the title, defeating her compatriot Francesca Di Lorenzo.

In the 16 & Under category, the champions were Juan Martin Jalif (Argentina) in the boys' division and Fernanda Labraña (Chile) in the girls' division. In the 14 & Under category, Mateus Alves (Brazil) won the boys' title, while Anfisa Danilchenko (Russia) claimed the girls' crown.

The 46th edition in 2016 took place once again in São José dos Campos, repeating the 2015 host city, but expanding to two venues: Associação Esportiva São José and Daher Tennis Lounge. The tournament ran from March 5 to 13, with the qualifying rounds held on March 5 and 6.

In 2018, Sebastián Báez from Argentina won the boys' singles title and Colombian Camila Osorio Serrano won the girls' title. Báez also won the doubles title, playing alongside French Clément Tabur. Canada's Leylah Fernandez earned the 16 & Under girls' singles trophy, defeating Clara Tauson from Denmark, 6–3, 7–6^{(7–4)}. Georgia's Mariam Dalakishvili and Poland's Anna Hertel were runners-up in the 16 & Under girls' doubles – losing to Dane Clara Tauson and Russian Anastasia Tikhonova – but were crowned champions in the 18s doubles event.

The 2023 U‑18 event was held in Criciúma as a J500-level tournament, with Yaroslav Demin (Russia) winning the boys’ singles title after defeating Brazilian João Fonseca in the final. In the girls' singles, Mayu Crossley (Japan) were the champion with a victory over Italian Alessandra Teodosescu. Italian Federico Cinà and Japanese Rei Sakamoto secured the boys' doubles title.

In 2024, the U‑18 event was held in Blumenau again as a J500-level tournament, with the 16 year old Oliver Bonding (Great Britain) winning the boys’ singles title and becoming the first Brit to do so since 2010.

== Past champions ==
=== Boys' singles, 18 and under ===
Year	Champion	Runner-up	Score
2017	(Serbia) Marko Miladinović	(Brazil) Thiago Seyboth Wild	6–3, 6–4
2018	(Argentina) Sebastián Báez	(United States) Tristan Boyer	6–4, 6–3
2019	(Argentina) Thiago Agustín Tirante	(United States) Martin Damm Jr.	5–7, 6–2, 6–2
2020	(China) Li Hanwen	(Brazil) Natan Rodrigues	6–4, ret.
2021	(China) Shang Juncheng	(Portugal) Miguel Gomes	6–2, 7–6^{(7–4)}
2022	(United States) Nishesh Basavareddy	(Slovenia) Bor Artnak	6–1, 6–4
2023	Yaroslav Demin	(Brazil) João Fonseca	6–2, 6–2
2024	(United Kingdom) Oliver Bonding	(Japan) Naoya Honda	7–5, 6–4
2025	(Spain) Andrés Santamarta Roig	(Brazil) João Pedro Didoni Bonini	6–4, 6–0
2026	(Argentina) Dante Pagani	(Puerto Rico) Yannik Álvarez	3–6, 6–4, 6–3

=== Boys' doubles, 18 and under ===
Year	Champions	Runners-up	Score
2017	(United States) Gianni Ross (United States) Danny Thomas	(United States) Alexandre Rotsaert (United States) Sangeet Sridhar	4–6, 6–3, [10–6]
2018	(Argentina) Sebastián Báez (France) Clément Tabur	(United States) Drew Baird (Colombia) Nicolás Mejía	6–4, 6–7^{(3–7)}, [10–7]
2019	(Japan) Shunsuke Mitsui (Japan) Keisuke Saitoh	(United States) Martin Damm Jr. (United States) Toby Kodat	6–4, 6–1
2020	(Italy) Luciano Darderi (Brazil) Gustavo Heide	(United States) Dali Blanch (Italy) Lorenzo Claverie	6–2, 6–3
2021	(United States) Alexander Bernard (United States) Dali Blanch	(United States) Jack Anthrop (United States) Aidan Kim	6–2, 6–4
2022	(United States) Aidan Kim (United States) Cooper Williams	(Paraguay) Daniel Vallejo (Paraguay) Martín A. Vergara Del Puerto	6–3, 6–0
2023	(Italy) Federico Cinà (Japan) Rei Sakamoto	Yaroslav Demin; Daniil Sarksian	6–2, 6–4
2024	(Colombia) Miguel Tobón (Argentina) Maximo Zeitune	Timofei Derepasko (Germany) Justin Engel	walkover
2025	(United States) Ronit Karki (United States) Jack Satterfield	(Romania) Yannick Theodor Alexandrescou (Japan) Ryo Tabata	6–4, 0–6, [10–4]
2026	(Slovakia) Marko Bekeni (Slovakia) Leon Sloboda	(Ecuador) Emilio Camacho (United States) Jack Secord	6–0, 6–7^{(5–7)}, [10–8]

=== Girls' singles, 18 and under ===
Year	Champion	Runner-up	Score
2017	(United States) Whitney Osuigwe	(United Kingdom) Emily Appleton	7–5, 6–4
2018	(Colombia) Camila Osorio	(United States) Alexa Noel	6–3, 6–4
2019	(Spain) Ane Mintegi del Olmo	(Japan) Natsumi Kawaguchi	6–2, 4–6, 6–2
2020	(United States) Elvina Kalieva	(Spain) Leyre Romero Gormaz	6–1, 1–6, 6–3
2021	(France) Océane Babel	(Slovakia) Bianca Behúlová	7–6^{(7–3)}, 6–4
2022	(Czech Republic) Lucie Havlíčková	(Canada) Annabelle Xu	6–2, 6–2
2023	(Japan) Mayu Crossley	(Italy) Alessandra Teodosescu	6–2, 7–6^{(7–4)}
2024	(United States) Kaitlyn Rolls	(Japan) Mayu Crossley	7–6^{(7–3)}, 6–2
2025	(United States) Thea Frodin	(Argentina) Sol Ailin Larraya Guidi	6–3, 6–1
2026	(Brazil) Nauhany Leme da Silva	(Brazil) Victoria Luiza Barros	6–3, 4–6, 6–3

=== Girls' doubles, 18 and under ===
Year	Champions	Runners-up	Score
2017	(United States) Elysia Bolton (United States) Vanessa Ong	(United States) Hailey Baptiste (United States) Whitney Osuigwe	4–6, 6–4, [10–5]
2018	(Georgia (country)) Mariam Dalakishvili (Poland) Anna Hertel	(United States) Elizabeth Mandlik (United States) Alexa Noel	6–3, 5–7, [10–7]
2019	(Japan) Natsumi Kawaguchi (Israel) Shavit Kimchi	(Japan) Saki Imamura (South Korea) Jeong Bo-young	6–1, 4–6, [11–9]
2020	(Argentina) Ana Geller (Uruguay) Guillermina Grant	(Ecuador) Mell Reasco González (Argentina) Solana Sierra	6–4, 6–4
2021	(Russia) Kira Pavlova (Russia) Diana Shnaider	(France) Océane Babel (Argentina) Solana Sierra	7–6^{(7–5)}, 6–2
2022	(Slovakia) Irina Balus (Slovakia) Nikola Daubnerová	(Poland) Weronika Ewald (New Zealand) Vivian Yang	6–1, 6–3
2023	(Italy) Francesca Gandolfi (Italy) Greta Greco Lucchina	(Argentina) Lourdes Ayala (Argentina) Luna Cinalli	6–4, 5–7, [10–6]
2024	(Brazil) Olivia Carneiro (Belgium) Jeline Vandromme	(United States) Kaitlyn Rolls (Norway) Emily Sartz-Lunde	7–6^{(7–3)}, 6–7^{(4–7)}, [10–8]
2025	(Brazil) Victoria Luiza Barros (Bulgaria) Yoana Konstantinova	(United States) Maya Iyengar (United States) Annika Penickova	6–3, 7–5
2026	(Romania) Maia Ilinca Burcescu (Jamaica) Alyssa James	(Argentina) Sol Ailin Larraya Guidi (Brazil) Nauhany Leme da Silva	6–4, 6–0
