= 2024 Porto Women's Indoor ITF 3 – Singles =

Singles
- 2024 Porto Women's Indoor ITF 3

Final
- Champion: (Hungary) Anna Bondár
- Runner-up: (Germany) Noma Noha Akugue
- Score: 7–6^{(7–4)}, 6–2

Events
Singles	Doubles
← 2024 ·	Porto Women's Indoor ITF	· 2025 →

Rebecca Šramková was the defending champion but chose not to participate.

Anna Bondár won the title, defeating Noma Noha Akugue in the final, 7–6^{(7–4)}, 6–2.

== Seeds ==
1. (Spain) Marina Bassols Ribera (quarterfinals)
2. (Hungary) Anna Bondár (champion)
3. (Ukraine) Daria Snigur (second round)
4. (Germany) Anna-Lena Friedsam (quarterfinals)
5. (Romania) Elena-Gabriela Ruse (first round)
6. (Germany) Ella Seidel (second round)
7. (Hungary) Panna Udvardy (first round)
8. (Ukraine) Katarina Zavatska (second round)

== Draw ==
=== Key ===
- Q = Qualifier
- WC = Wild card
- LL = Lucky loser
- Alt = Alternate
- SE = Special exempt
- PR = Protected ranking
- ITF = ITF entry
- JE = Junior exempt
- w/o = Walkover
- r = Retired
- d = Defaulted
- SR = Special ranking

=== Finals ===
Semifinals
(Netherlands) Suzan Lamens	4	5
(Germany) Noma Noha Akugue	6	7
(Switzerland) Céline Naef	6	6^{5}	3
2	(Hungary) Anna Bondár	2	7^{7}	6

Final
(Germany) Noma Noha Akugue	6^{4}	2
2	(Hungary) Anna Bondár	7^{7}	6

=== Top half ===
First round
1	(Spain) M Bassols Ribera	6	6
WC	(Portugal) L Couto	0	1
Q	(Netherlands) A Koevermans	1	7	6
WC	(Spain) C Cerviño Ruiz	6	5	2
(Netherlands) S Lamens	6	6
(Romania) I Bara	2	4
LL	(France) A Hesse	1	7^{9}	7
7	(Hungary) P Udvardy	6	6^{7}	5
3	(Ukraine) D Snigur	6	6
(Czech Republic) D Šalková	3	3
Q	(Spain) L Romero Gormaz	6	4	6
WC	(Portugal) M Jorge	4	6	3
(Portugal) F Jorge	7	6
Q	(France) L Boisson	5	0
(Germany) N Noha Akugue	6	6
5	(Romania) E-G Ruse	2	1

Second round
1	(Spain) M Bassols Ribera	6	7
Q	(Netherlands) A Koevermans	2	5
(Netherlands) S Lamens	6	6^{7}	6
LL	(France) A Hesse	1	7^{9}	2
3	(Ukraine) D Snigur	4	6^{9}
Q	(Spain) L Romero Gormaz	6	7^{11}
(Portugal) F Jorge	4	6	2
(Germany) N Noha Akugue	6	3	6

Quarterfinals
1	(Spain) M Bassols Ribera	7	6^{5}	4
(Netherlands) S Lamens	5	7^{7}	6
Q	(Spain) L Romero Gormaz	4	6	4
(Germany) N Noha Akugue	6	3	6

Semifinals
(Netherlands) S Lamens	4	5
(Germany) N Noha Akugue	6	7

=== Bottom half ===
First round
6	(Germany) E Seidel	6	6
Q	(Liechtenstein) K von Deichmann	0	3
(Switzerland) C Naef	6	6
Q	(Switzerland) S Bandecchi	1	2
Q	(Serbia) M Ristić	1	6	3
Q	(Australia) T Gibson	6	4	6
(Slovenia) V Erjavec	7	4	4
4	(Germany) A-L Friedsam	5	6	6
8	(Ukraine) K Zavatska	7	4	6
Q	(United States) A Rogers	5	6	3
(Cyprus) R Șerban	4	2
(Philippines) A Eala	6	6
(Austria) S Kraus	6	6
WC	(Portugal) E Hamaliy	2	1
V Savinykh	0	1
2	(Hungary) A Bondár	6	6

Second round
6	(Germany) E Seidel	3	1
(Switzerland) C Naef	6	6
Q	(Australia) T Gibson	6	6^{4}	1
4	(Germany) A-L Friedsam	3	7^{7}	6
8	(Ukraine) K Zavatska	0	3
(Philippines) A Eala	6	6
(Austria) S Kraus	7^{7}	1	0^{r}
2	(Hungary) A Bondár	6^{2}	6	2

Quarterfinals
(Switzerland) C Naef	6	7^{7}
4	(Germany) A-L Friedsam	2	6^{2}
(Philippines) A Eala	4	7^{7}	1
2	(Hungary) A Bondár	6	6^{3}	6

Semifinals
(Switzerland) C Naef	6	6^{5}	3
2	(Hungary) A Bondár	2	7^{7}	6
