= 2024 Porto Women's Indoor ITF 1 – Doubles =

Doubles
- 2024 Porto Women's Indoor ITF 1

Final
- Champions: (United Kingdom) Sarah Beth Grey (United Kingdom) Olivia Nicholls
- Runners-up: (Portugal) Francisca Jorge (Portugal) Matilde Jorge
- Score: 4–6, 6–3, [10–6]

Events
| Singles | Doubles |
| ← 2023 · | Porto Women's Indoor ITF | · 2024 → |

Ekaterine Gorgodze and Leyre Romero Gormaz were the defending champions.

Sarah Beth Grey and Olivia Nicholls won the title, defeating Francisca Jorge and Matilde Jorge in the final, 4–6, 6–3, [10–6].

== Seeds ==
1. (United Kingdom) Alicia Barnett / (Czech Republic) Anastasia Dețiuc (semifinals)
2. (United Kingdom) Emily Appleton / (United Kingdom) Freya Christie (quarterfinals)
3. (Portugal) Francisca Jorge / (Portugal) Matilde Jorge (final)
4. (United Kingdom) Sarah Beth Grey / (United Kingdom) Olivia Nicholls (champions)

== Draw ==
=== Key ===
- Q = Qualifier
- WC = Wild card
- LL = Lucky loser
- Alt = Alternate
- SE = Special exempt
- PR = Protected ranking
- ITF = ITF entry
- JE = Junior exempt
- w/o = Walkover
- r = Retired
- d = Defaulted
- SR = Special ranking

First round
1 | (United Kingdom) A Barnett (Czech Republic) A Dețiuc | 6 | 6
WC | (Portugal) L Couto (Portugal) S Lança | 1 | 0
(United States) R Anderson (United States) D Hewitt | 7 | 1 | [10]
(France) L Jeanjean (Serbia) N Stevanović | 5 | 6 | [4]
3 | (Portugal) F Jorge (Portugal) M Jorge | 4 | 6 | [10]
(Colombia) E Arango (Spain) J Bouzas Maneiro | 6 | 2 | [4]
(Germany) N Schunk (Liechtenstein) K von Deichmann | 6 | 6
WC | (Portugal) M Garcia (Portugal) E Hamaliy | 2 | 3
(Romania) M Bulgaru (Slovakia) R Šramková | 6 | 5 | [9]
(Slovenia) V Erjavec (Germany) N Noha Akugue | 3 | 7 | [11]
(Georgia (country)) N Dzalamidze (Netherlands) L Pattinama Kerkhove | 5 | 6 | [7]
4 | (United Kingdom) SB Grey (United Kingdom) O Nicholls | 7 | 4 | [10]
(Ukraine) M Kolb (Ukraine) N Kolb | 3 | 2
(Poland) M Chwalińska (Czech Republic) J Malečková | 6 | 6
WC | (Portugal) A Freitas (Portugal) AF Santos | 6^{3} | 1
2 | (United Kingdom) E Appleton (United Kingdom) F Christie | 7^{7} | 6

Quarterfinals
1 | (United Kingdom) A Barnett (Czech Republic) A Dețiuc | 6 | 4 | [12]
(United States) R Anderson (United States) D Hewitt | 2 | 6 | [10]
3 | (Portugal) F Jorge (Portugal) M Jorge
(Germany) N Schunk (Liechtenstein) K von Deichmann | w/o
(Slovenia) V Erjavec (Germany) N Noha Akugue | 6^{6} | 7^{7} | [4]
4 | (United Kingdom) SB Grey (United Kingdom) O Nicholls | 7^{8} | 6^{4} | [10]
(Poland) M Chwalińska (Czech Republic) J Malečková | 6 | 6
2 | (United Kingdom) E Appleton (United Kingdom) F Christie | 4 | 1

Semifinals
1 | (United Kingdom) A Barnett (Czech Republic) A Dețiuc | 2 | 4
3 | (Portugal) F Jorge (Portugal) M Jorge | 6 | 6
4 | (United Kingdom) SB Grey (United Kingdom) O Nicholls | 6^{5} | 6 | [10]
(Poland) M Chwalińska (Czech Republic) J Malečková | 7^{7} | 4 | [5]

Final
3 | (Portugal) F Jorge (Portugal) M Jorge | 6 | 3 | [6]
4 | (United Kingdom) SB Grey (United Kingdom) O Nicholls | 4 | 6 | [10]
