= 2026 Curitiba Open – Doubles =

Doubles
- 2026 Curitiba Open

Final
- Champions: (Slovenia) Dalila Jakupović (Slovenia) Nika Radišić
- Runners-up: (Brazil) Nauhany Vitória Leme da Silva (Brazil) Laura Pigossi
- Score: 6–4, 6–2

Details
- Draw: 8
- Seeds: 2

Events
Singles	Doubles
- Curitiba Open

This was the first edition of the tournament.

Dalila Jakupović and Nika Radišić won the title, after defeating Nauhany Vitória Leme da Silva and Laura Pigossi 6–4, 6–2 in the final.

== Seeds ==
1. (Slovenia) Dalila Jakupović / (Slovenia) Nika Radišić (champions)
2. (Brazil) Ana Candiotto / (Greece) Despina Papamichail (semifinals)

== Draw ==
Key

- Q = Qualifier
- WC = Wild card
- LL = Lucky loser
- Alt = Alternate
- ITF = ITF entry
- PR = Protected ranking
- SR = Special ranking
- SE = Special exempt
- JE = Junior exempt
- JR = Junior Accelerator Programme entrant
- CO = College Accelerator Programme entrant
- NG = Next Gen Accelerator Program entrant
- w/o = Walkover
- r = Retired
- d = Defaulted

=== Draw ===
Quarterfinals
1	(Slovenia) D Jakupović (Slovenia) N Radišić	6	6
(Brazil) L Fullana (Brazil) R Pereira	2	1
(Argentina) ML Carlé (Argentina) J Riera	2	6	[10]
(Italy) L Bronzetti (Austria) J Grabher	6	4	[5]
WC	(Brazil) J Konishi Camargo Silva (Brazil) M Souza	2	5
(Brazil) NV Leme da Silva (Brazil) L Pigossi	6	7
(Argentina) J González Daniele (Chile) A Vergara Rivera	0	4
2	(Brazil) A Candiotto (Greece) D Papamichail	6	6

Semifinals
1	(Slovenia) D Jakupović (Slovenia) N Radišić	7^{7}	1	[10]
(Argentina) ML Carlé (Argentina) J Riera	6^{4}	6	[8]
(Brazil) NV Leme da Silva (Brazil) L Pigossi	4	6	[11]
2	(Brazil) A Candiotto (Greece) D Papamichail	6	4	[9]

Final
1	(Slovenia) D Jakupović (Slovenia) N Radišić	6	6
(Brazil) NV Leme da Silva (Brazil) L Pigossi	4	2
