= 2024 Porto Women's Indoor ITF 3 – Doubles =

Doubles
- 2024 Porto Women's Indoor ITF 3

Final
- Champions: (Hungary) Anna Bondár (Switzerland) Céline Naef
- Runners-up: (Portugal) Francisca Jorge (Portugal) Matilde Jorge
- Score: 6–4, 3–6, [11–9]

Events
| Singles | Doubles |
| ← 2024 · | Porto Women's Indoor ITF | · 2025 → |

Veronika Erjavec and Dominika Šalková were the defending champions but Šalková chose not to participate. Erjavec partnered alongside Irina Bara, but lost in the first round to Isabelle Haverlag and Anna Rogers.

Anna Bondár and Céline Naef won the title, defeating Francisca Jorge and Matilde Jorge in the final, 6–4, 3–6, [11–9].

== Seeds ==
1. (Germany) Julia Lohoff / (Switzerland) Conny Perrin (first round)
2. (United Kingdom) Alicia Barnett / (Germany) Anna-Lena Friedsam (semifinals)
3. (Venezuela) Andrea Gámiz / (Colombia) Yuliana Lizarazo (first round)
4. (Portugal) Francisca Jorge / (Portugal) Matilde Jorge (final)

== Draw ==
=== Key ===
- Q = Qualifier
- WC = Wild card
- LL = Lucky loser
- Alt = Alternate
- SE = Special exempt
- PR = Protected ranking
- ITF = ITF entry
- JE = Junior exempt
- w/o = Walkover
- r = Retired
- d = Defaulted
- SR = Special ranking

First round
1 | (Germany) J Lohoff (Switzerland) C Perrin | 7^{7} | 0 | [8]
(Netherlands) S Lamens (Cyprus) R Șerban | 6^{2} | 6 | [10]
(Hungary) A Bondár (Switzerland) C Naef | 6 | 6
(Portugal) T Franco Dias (Portugal) E Hamaliy | 0 | 1
3 | (Venezuela) A Gámiz (Colombia) Y Lizarazo | 7 | 3 | [4]
(Germany) E Seidel (Liechtenstein) K von Deichmann | 5 | 6 | [10]
(Germany) L Papadakis (Bosnia and Herzegovina) A Wagner | 3 | 3
(United Kingdom) M Brooks (Hong Kong) E Chong | 6 | 6
(Netherlands) I Haverlag (United States) A Rogers | 6 | 6
(Romania) I Bara (Slovenia) V Erjavec | 4 | 1
(Portugal) L Couto (Ukraine) M Kostiuk | 3 | 0
4 | (Portugal) F Jorge (Portugal) M Jorge | 6 | 6
(India) V Shinde (Romania) A Todoni | 6^{3} | 6 | [9]
(United Kingdom) A Collins (Philippines) A Eala | 7^{7} | 4 | [11]
(Spain) M Bassols Ribera (Austria) S Kraus | 4 | 4
2 | (United Kingdom) A Barnett (Germany) A-L Friedsam | 6 | 6

Quarterfinals
(Netherlands) S Lamens (Cyprus) R Șerban | 3 | 5
(Hungary) A Bondár (Switzerland) C Naef | 6 | 7
(Germany) E Seidel (Liechtenstein) K von Deichmann | 2 | 2
(United Kingdom) M Brooks (Hong Kong) E Chong | 6 | 6
(Netherlands) I Haverlag (United States) A Rogers | 5 | 6^{5}
4 | (Portugal) F Jorge (Portugal) M Jorge | 7 | 7^{7}
(United Kingdom) A Collins (Philippines) A Eala | 3 | 4
2 | (United Kingdom) A Barnett (Germany) A-L Friedsam | 6 | 6

Semifinals
(Hungary) A Bondár (Switzerland) C Naef | 6 | 5 | [10]
(United Kingdom) M Brooks (Hong Kong) E Chong | 4 | 7 | [4]
4 | (Portugal) F Jorge (Portugal) M Jorge | 6 | 6
2 | (United Kingdom) A Barnett (Germany) A-L Friedsam | 2 | 3

Final
(Hungary) A Bondár (Switzerland) C Naef | 6 | 3 | [11]
4 | (Portugal) F Jorge (Portugal) M Jorge | 4 | 6 | [9]
