= 2024 Porto Women's Indoor ITF 1 – Singles =

Singles
- 2024 Porto Women's Indoor ITF 1

Final
- Champion: (Spain) Jéssica Bouzas Maneiro
- Runner-up: (Poland) Maja Chwalińska
- Score: 3–6, 6–0, 6–4

Events
Singles	Doubles
← 2023 ·	Porto Women's Indoor ITF	· 2024 →

Greet Minnen was the defending champion but chose not to participate.

Jéssica Bouzas Maneiro won the title, defeating Maja Chwalińska in the final, 3–6, 6–0, 6–4.

== Seeds ==
1. (Spain) Marina Bassols Ribera (quarterfinals)
2. (United Kingdom) Harriet Dart (first round)
3. (Spain) Nuria Párrizas Díaz (second round)
4. (Colombia) Emiliana Arango (first round)
5. (Italy) Lucrezia Stefanini (second round)
6. (Sweden) Rebecca Peterson (second round)
7. (Slovakia) Rebecca Šramková (second round)
8. (France) Léolia Jeanjean (second round)

== Draw ==
=== Key ===
- Q = Qualifier
- WC = Wild card
- LL = Lucky loser
- Alt = Alternate
- SE = Special exempt
- PR = Protected ranking
- ITF = ITF entry
- JE = Junior exempt
- w/o = Walkover
- r = Retired
- d = Defaulted
- SR = Special ranking

=== Finals ===
Semifinals
(Spain) Jéssica Bouzas Maneiro	6	5	6
(France) Elsa Jacquemot	1	7	1
Q	(Austria) Sinja Kraus	7^{8}	4	3
SR	(Poland) Maja Chwalińska	6^{6}	6	6

Final
(Spain) Jéssica Bouzas Maneiro	3	6	6
SR	(Poland) Maja Chwalińska	6	0	4

=== Top half ===
First round
1	(Spain) M Bassols Ribera	6	6
(Serbia) N Stevanović	4	1
Q	A Charaeva	6	6
WC	(Portugal) L Couto	2	2
WC	(Portugal) F Jorge	2	2
(Spain) J Bouzas Maneiro	6	6
(Switzerland) J Teichmann	2	3
6	(Sweden) R Peterson	6	6
4	(Colombia) E Arango	1	0
Q	(Germany) N Schunk	6	6
Q	(Liechtenstein) K von Deichmann	1	6	6
(Ukraine) K Zavatska	6	2	1
(Czech Republic) T Martincová	6	4	1
(France) E Jacquemot	4	6	6
Q	(Italy) S Ambrosio	5	2
7	(Slovakia) R Šramková	7	6

Second round
1	(Spain) M Bassols Ribera	4	7^{7}	6
Q	A Charaeva	6	6^{3}	3
(Spain) J Bouzas Maneiro	6	6
6	(Sweden) R Peterson	4	1
Q	(Germany) N Schunk	6	4	3
Q	(Liechtenstein) K von Deichmann	3	6	6
(France) E Jacquemot	7	7
7	(Slovakia) R Šramková	5	5

Quarterfinals
1	(Spain) M Bassols Ribera	4	3
(Spain) J Bouzas Maneiro	6	6
Q	(Liechtenstein) K von Deichmann
(France) E Jacquemot	w/o

Semifinals
(Spain) J Bouzas Maneiro	6	5	6
(France) E Jacquemot	1	7	1

=== Bottom half ===
First round
8	(France) L Jeanjean	6	6
SR	O Selekhmeteva	0	1
WC	(Portugal) M Garcia	0	3
Q	(Austria) S Kraus	6	6
(Germany) N Noha Akugue	1	5
Q	(United States) R Anderson	6	7
Q	(United Kingdom) S Kartal	1	6	1
3	(Spain) N Párrizas Díaz	6	3	6
5	(Italy) L Stefanini	6	6
Q	(Bosnia and Herzegovina) N Berberović	1	3
SR	(Poland) M Chwalińska	6	6
LL	(France) A Albié	2	0
(Romania) M Bulgaru	6	6
WC	(Portugal) AF Santos	0	0
(Slovenia) V Erjavec	7^{7}	2	6
2	(United Kingdom) H Dart	6^{3}	6	1

Second round
8	(France) L Jeanjean	7^{7}	1	2
Q	(Austria) S Kraus	6^{3}	6	6
Q	(United States) R Anderson	7	6^{4}	6
3	(Spain) N Párrizas Díaz	5	7^{7}	2
5	(Italy) L Stefanini	5	1
SR	(Poland) M Chwalińska	7	6
(Romania) M Bulgaru	5	3
(Slovenia) V Erjavec	7	6

Quarterfinals
Q	(Austria) S Kraus	6	6
Q	(United States) R Anderson	1	1
SR	(Poland) M Chwalińska	6	6
(Slovenia) V Erjavec	1	1

Semifinals
Q	(Austria) S Kraus	7^{8}	4	3
SR	(Poland) M Chwalińska	6^{6}	6	6
