= Curitiba Open =

Tournament information
- Event name: Curitiba Open
- Location: Curitiba, Brazil
- Venue: Graciosa Country Club
- Category: WTA 125
- Surface: Clay
- Draw: 32S/8Q/8D
- Prize money: $115,000
- Website: Official Website

Current champions (2026)
- Singles: (France) Alice Tubello
- Doubles: (Slovenia) Dalila Jakupović (Slovenia) Nika Radišić

The Curitiba Open is a tournament for professional female tennis players played on outdoor clay courts. The event is classified as a WTA 125 tournament and is held at the Graciosa Country Club in Curitiba, Brazil. The city of Curitiba already hosts an ATP Challenger 75 Copa Internacional de Tenis at the same venue.

== Past finals ==
=== Singles ===
Year	Champion	Runners-up	Score
2026	(France) Alice Tubello	(Austria) Julia Grabher	3–6, 7–6^{(7–5)}, 7–6^{(7–2)}

=== Doubles ===
Year	Champions	Runners-up	Score
2026	(Slovenia) Dalila Jakupović (Slovenia) Nika Radišić	(Brazil) Nauhany Vitória Leme da Silva (Brazil) Laura Pigossi	6–4, 6–2
