= Gaspar, Santa Catarina =

Coordinates: 26°56′S 48°58′W

Gaspar
- Municipality
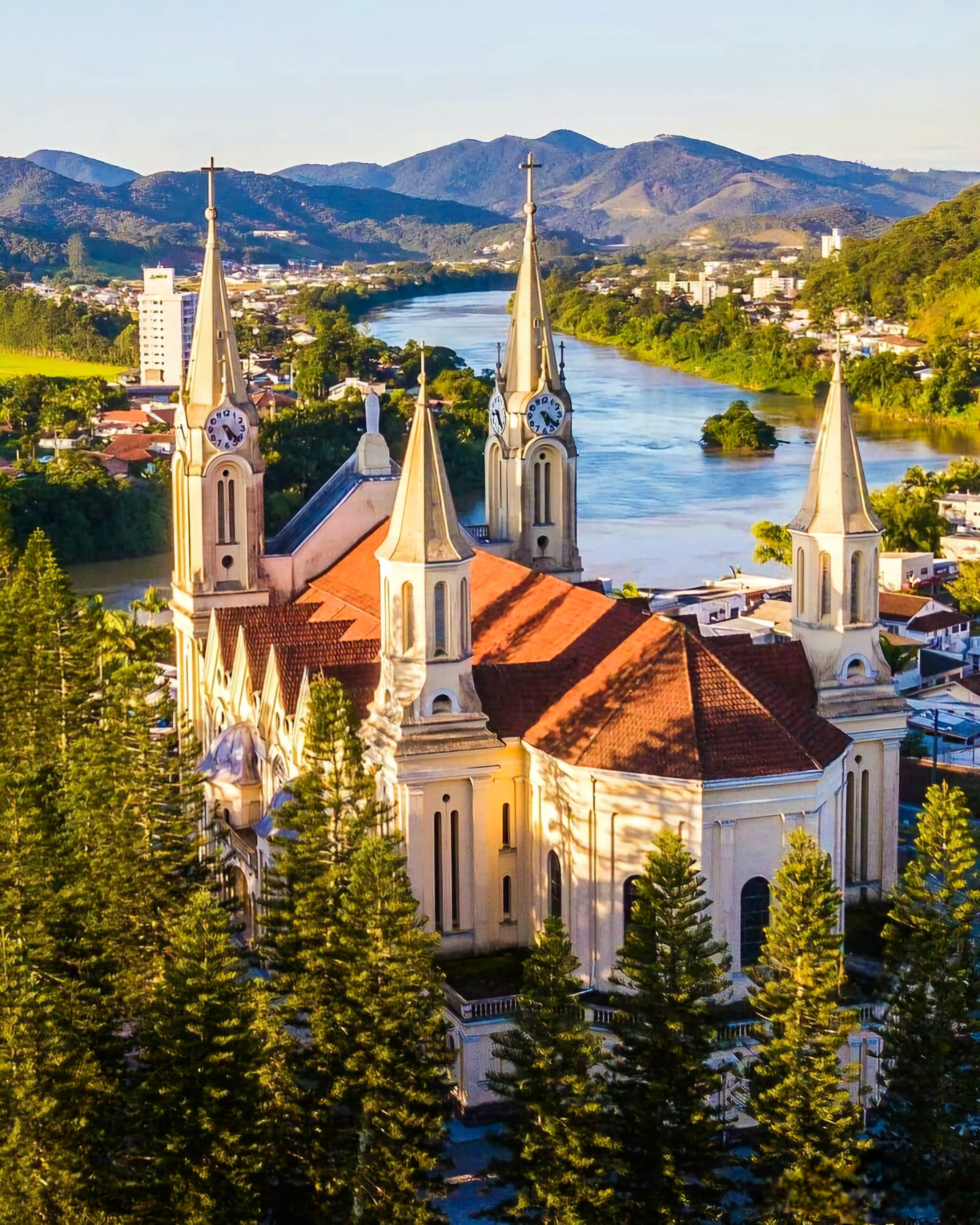

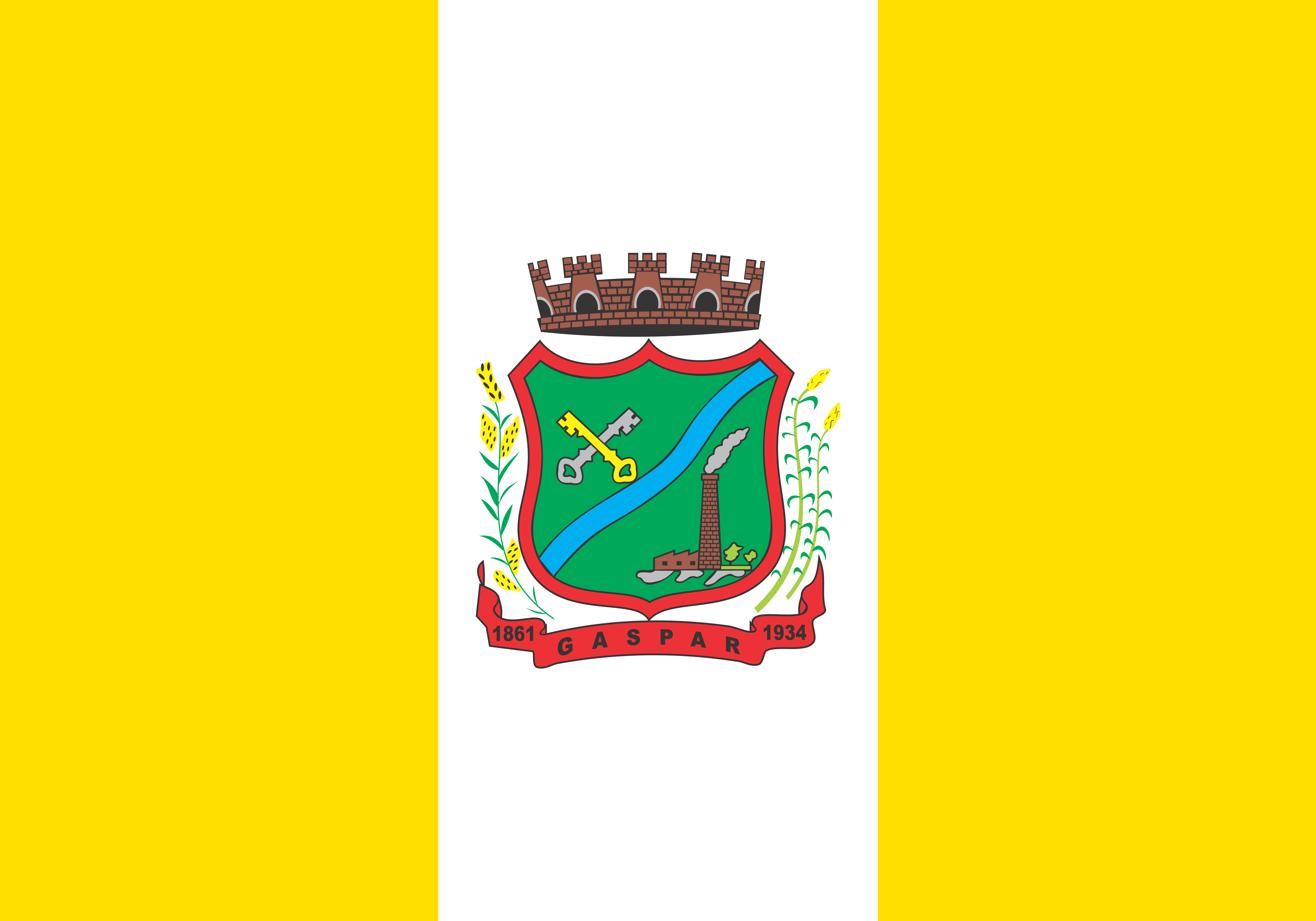
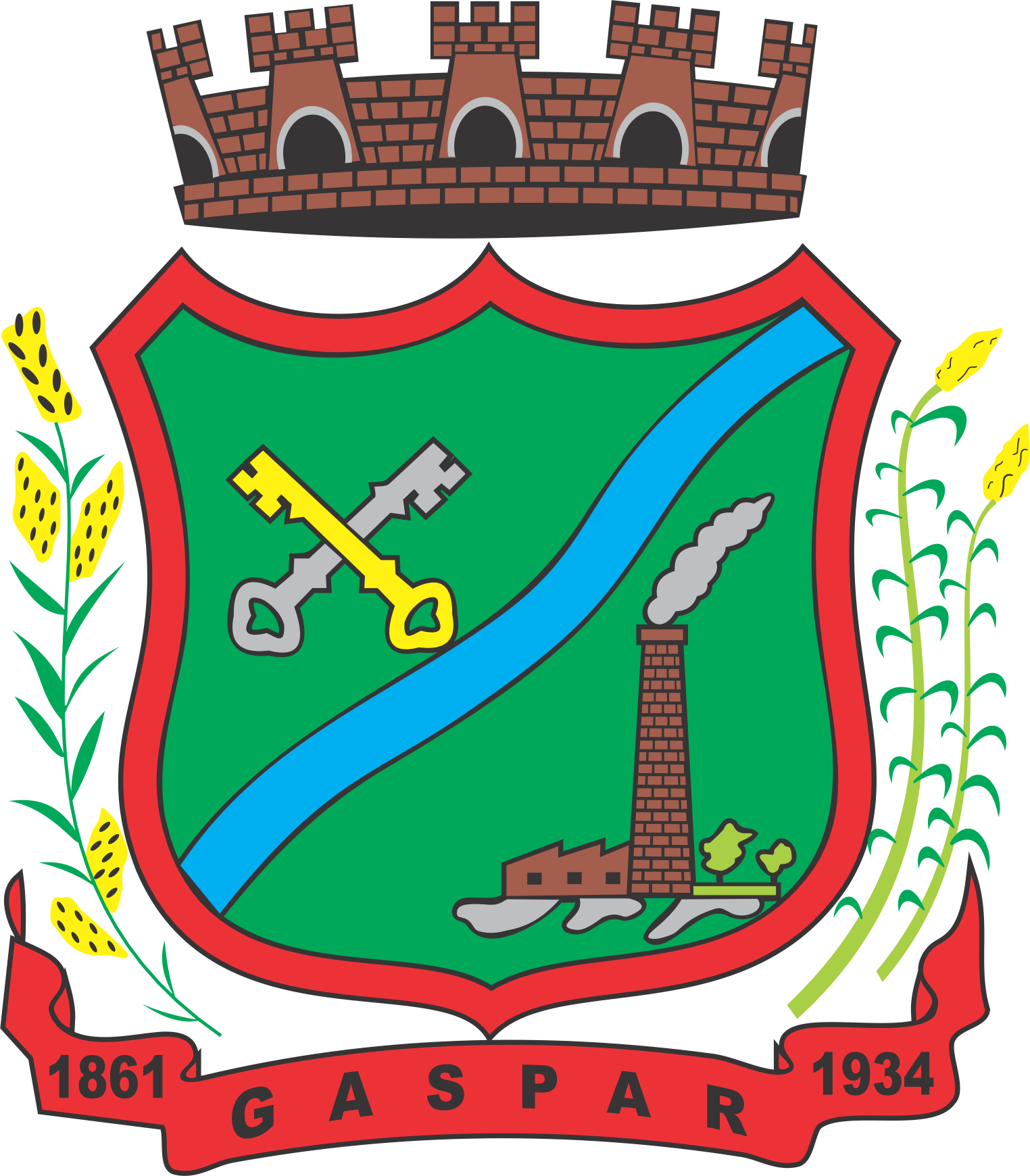
- Flag Coat of arms

- Country: Brazil
- Region: South
- State: Santa Catarina
- Mesoregion: Vale do Itajai

Government
  - Mayor: Paulo Koerich (2024-2028)

Population (2022 Brazilian census)
  - Total: 73,053
- Time zone: UTC -3
- Website: www.gaspar.sc.gov.br

Gaspar, Santa Catarina is a municipality in the state of Santa Catarina in the South region of Brazil.

== See also ==
- List of municipalities in Santa Catarina
