= Nika Radišić =

Slovenian tennis player (born 2000)

- Country (sports): Slovenia
- Born: 19 March 2000 (age 26) Koper, Slovenia
- Plays: Right (two-handed backhand)
- Prize money: $197,052

Singles
- Career record: 198–179
- Career titles: 1 ITF
- Highest ranking: No. 330 (12 August 2024)
- Current ranking: No. 897 (21 September 2026)

Doubles
- Career record: 249–128
- Career titles: 1 WTA, 2 WTA 125
- Highest ranking: No. 71 (31 August 2026)
- Current ranking: No. 73 (21 September 2026)

Grand Slam doubles results
- US Open: 1R (2026)

Team competitions
- Fed Cup: 2–2
- Last updated on: 22 September 2026.

Nika Radišić (born 19 March 2000) is a Slovenian professional tennis player. She has career-high rankings of world No. 330 in singles and No. 71 in doubles. She has won one WTA Tour and two WTA 125 titles in doubles, along with one singles title and 30 doubles titles on the ITF Circuit.

Radišić made her debut for the Slovenia Fed Cup team in 2018.

She made her WTA Tour main-draw debut as a wildcard entrant at the 2021 Portorož Open, losing to Kristina Mladenovic in the first round.

Partnering with Dalila Jakupović, Radišić won her first WTA Tour doubles title at the 2026 Hamburg Open, defeating top seeds Magali Kempen and Alexandra Panova in the final.

== WTA Tour finals ==
=== Doubles: 1 (title) ===
Legend WTA 500 WTA 250 (1–0)	Finals by surface Hard (0–0) Clay (1–0)

Result	W–L	Date	Tournament	Tier	Surface	Partner	Opponents	Score
Win	1–0	Jul 2026	Hamburg Open, Germany	WTA 250	Clay	(Slovenia) Dalila Jakupović	(Belgium) Magali Kempen; Alexandra Panova	5-7, 6–3, [10–5]

== WTA 125 finals ==
=== Doubles: 7 (4 titles, 3 runner-ups) ===
Result	W–L	Date	Tournament	Surface	Partner	Opponents	Score
Loss	0–1	Sep 2025	Ljubljana Open, Slovenia	Clay	(Slovenia) Dalila Jakupović	(Czech Republic) Miriam Škoch (Switzerland) Simona Waltert	2–6, 2–6
Loss	0–2	Jun 2026	Foggia Open, Italy	Clay	(France) Estelle Cascino	(Chinese Taipei) Cho I-hsuan (Chinese Taipei) Cho Yi-tsen	6–4, 3–6, [4–10]
Win	1–2	Jun 2026	Internazionali di Brescia, Italy	Clay	(Slovenia) Dalila Jakupović	(Romania) Irina Bara (Switzerland) Naïma Karamoko	6–4, 7–5
Loss	1–3	Jul 2026	ATV Tennis Open, Italy	Clay	(Croatia) Lucija Ćirić Bagarić	(France) Estelle Cascino (China) Feng Shuo	4–6, 4–6
Win	2–3	Aug 2026	Philly Open, United States	Hard	(Netherlands) Isabelle Haverlag	(Czech Republic) Jesika Malečková (Czech Republic) Miriam Škoch	6–2, 1–6, [10–7]
Win	3–3	Oct 2026	Lisboa Belém Open, Portugal	Clay	(Slovenia) Dalila Jakupović	(Poland) Gina Feistel (Cyprus) Raluca Șerban	6–3, 6–1
Win	4–3	Oct 2026	Curitiba Open, Brazil	Clay	(Slovenia) Dalila Jakupović	(Brazil) Nauhany Vitória Leme da Silva (Brazil) Laura Pigossi	6–4, 6–2

== ITF Circuit finals ==
=== Singles: 5 (1 title, 4 runner-ups) ===
Legend W25/35 tournaments (0–4) W15 tournaments (1–0)	Finals by surface Clay (1–4)

Result	W–L	Date	Tournament	Tier	Surface	Opponent	Score
Win	1–0	Apr 2019	ITF Antalya, Turkey	W15	Clay	(Japan) Yuki Naito	6–3, 4–6, 7–6^{(5)}
Loss	1–1	Aug 2019	Internazionali di Cordenons, Italy	W25	Clay	(Netherlands) Arantxa Rus	6–4, 4–6, 1–6
Loss	1–2	Aug 2023	ITF Bydgoszcz, Poland	W25	Clay	(Slovenia) Dalila Jakupović	2–6, 1–6
Loss	1–3	Jul 2024	ITF Aschaffenburg, Germany	W35	Clay	(United States) Madison Sieg	4–6, 4–6
Loss	1–4	Jun 2025	ITF Tarvisio, Italy	W35	Clay	(Italy) Vittoria Paganetti	0–6, 4–6

=== Doubles: 43 (30 titles, 13 runner-ups) ===
Legend W100 tournaments (2–2) W60/75 tournaments (3–3) W40 tournaments (0–1) W25/35 tournaments (18–4) W15 tournaments (7–3)	Finals by surface Hard (5–0) Clay (25–13)

Result	W–L	Date	Tournament	Tier	Surface	Partner	Opponents	Score
Win	1–0	Oct 2017	ITF Antalya, Turkey	W15	Clay	(Slovakia) Viktória Morvayová	(Romania) Cristina Adamescu (Romania) Ilona Georgiana Ghioroaie	6–4, 6–4
Win	2–0	Dec 2018	ITF Cairo, Egypt	W15	Clay	(Switzerland) Joanne Züger	(Romania) Cristina Ene (Italy) Michele Alexandra Zmău	6–3, 6–3
Win	3–0	Dec 2018	ITF Cairo, Egypt	W15	Clay	(Romania) Selma Ștefania Cadar	(Romania) Oana Gavrilă (Romania) Gabriela Tătăruș	6–3, 0–6, [14–12]
Win	4–0	Mar 2019	ITF Antalya, Turkey	W15	Clay	(Czech Republic) Johana Marková	(Estonia) Elena Malõgina (South Korea) Park So-hyun	6–0, 6–0
Win	5–0	Aug 2019	Internazionali di Cordenons, Italy	W25	Clay	(Slovenia) Veronika Erjavec	(Italy) Martina Caregaro (Switzerland) Lisa Sabino	6–3, 7–5
Loss	5–1	Oct 2019	Kiskút Open, Hungary	W100	Clay (i)	(Slovenia) Nina Potočnik	(Spain) Georgina García Pérez (Hungary) Fanny Stollár	1–6, 6–7^{(4)}
Win	6–1	Nov 2019	ITF Antalya, Turkey	W15	Hard	(Czech Republic) Johana Marková	(Spain) Paula Arias Manjón (Malta) Francesca Curmi	6–2, 4–6, [11–9]
Win	7–1	Nov 2019	ITF Antalya, Turkey	W15	Hard	(Czech Republic) Johana Marková	(Turkey) İpek Öz (Ukraine) Viktoriya Petrenko	6–4, 7–5
Loss	7–2	Aug 2020	Internazionali di Cordenons, Italy	W15	Clay	(Italy) Angelica Moratelli	(Italy) Martina Colmegna (Italy) Federica di Sarra	2–6, 6–7^{(7)}
Loss	7–3	Nov 2020	ITF Heraklion, Greece	W15	Clay	(Czech Republic) Johana Marková	(Slovakia) Alica Rusová (Switzerland) Nina Stadler	0–6, 4–6
Loss	7–4	Mar 2021	ITF Antalya, Turkey	W15	Clay	(Russia) Darya Astakhova	(Czech Republic) Miriam Kolodziejová (Czech Republic) Aneta Laboutková	3–6, 6–4, [6–10]
Loss	7–5	May 2021	Zagreb Ladies Open, Croatia	W60	Clay	(Romania) Andreea Prisăcariu	(Austria) Barbara Haas (Poland) Katarzyna Kawa	6–7^{(1)}, 7–5, [6–10]
Win	8–5	Jul 2021	ITF Tarvisio, Italy	W25	Clay	(Sweden) Caijsa Hennemann	(Chile) Bárbara Gatica (Brazil) Rebeca Pereira	6–4, 6–1
Win	9–5	Sep 2021	ITF Trieste, Italy	W25	Clay	(Romania) Andreea Prisăcariu	(Lithuania) Justina Mikulskytė (Australia) Olivia Tjandramulia	7–5, 6–2
Win	10–5	May 2022	ITF Santa Margherita di Pula, Italy	W25	Clay	(Lithuania) Justina Mikulskytė	(Spain) Leyre Romero Gormaz (Netherlands) Arantxa Rus	4–6, 7–5, [10–7]
Win	11–5	Sep 2022	ITF Trieste, Italy	W25	Clay	(China) Lu Jiajing	(Croatia) Lucija Ćirić Bagarić (Latvia) Diāna Marcinkēviča	7–5, 3–6, [15–13]
Loss	11–6	Sep 2022	Vrnjačka Banja Open, Serbia	W60	Clay	(Romania) Cristina Dinu	Darya Astakhova; Ekaterina Reyngold	6–3, 2–6, [8–10]
Win	12–6	Oct 2022	ITF Seville, Spain	W25	Clay	(Turkey) İpek Öz	(Ukraine) Maryna Kolb (Ukraine) Nadiia Kolb	7–5, 7–6^{(3)}
Win	13–6	Jan 2023	ITF Antalya, Turkiye	W25	Clay	(Romania) Cristina Dinu	(Egypt) Sandra Samir (Hong Kong) Cody Wong	7–5, 6–2
Win	14–6	Mar 2023	ITF Antalya, Turkiye	W15	Clay	(Czech Republic) Denisa Hindová	(Turkey) Başak Eraydın (Japan) Yukina Saigo	7–6^{(6)}, 6–3
Loss	14–7	Apr 2023	ITF Split, Croatia	W40	Clay	(Croatia) Tara Würth	(Slovenia) Veronika Erjavec (North Macedonia) Lina Gjorcheska	1–6, 4–6
Win	15–7	May 2023	ITF Warmbad Villach, Austria	W25	Clay	(Switzerland) Jenny Dürst	(United States) Jessie Aney (Germany) Lena Papadakis	6–2, 7–6^{(4)}
Loss	15–8	Jun 2023	ITF Tarvisio, Italy	W25	Clay	(Bosnia and Herzegovina) Anita Wagner	(Slovenia) Veronika Erjavec (Czech Republic) Dominika Šalková	0–6, 3–6
Win	16–8	Aug 2023	ITF Erwitte, Germany	W25	Clay	(Bosnia and Herzegovina) Anita Wagner	(Russia) Ekaterina Ovcharenko (Hungary) Amarissa Tóth	7–5, 7–6^{(4)}
Win	17–8	Aug 2023	ITF Bydgoszcz, Poland	W25	Clay	(Slovenia) Dalila Jakupović	(Poland) Zuzanna Pawlikowska (Poland) Malwina Rowińska	6–4, 6–4
Win	18–8	Sep 2023	ITF Trieste, Italy	W25	Clay	(Bosnia and Herzegovina) Anita Wagner	(Croatia) Mariana Dražić; Anastasia Gasanova	6–1, 6–1
Loss	18–9	Oct 2023	ITF Santa Margherita di Pula, Italy	W25	Clay	(Bosnia and Herzegovina) Anita Wagner	(Italy) Martina Colmegna (Italy) Lisa Pigato	4–6, 5–7
Win	19–9	Jan 2024	ITF Antalya, Turkiye	W35	Clay	(Romania) Cristina Dinu	Amina Anshba (Ukraine) Valeriya Strakhova	6–2, 3–6, [13–11]
Win	20–9	Mar 2024	ITF Terrassa, Spain	W35	Clay	(Bosnia and Herzegovina) Anita Wagner	(Spain) Yvonne Cavallé Reimers (India) Vasanti Shinde	7–5, 7–6^{(7)}
Win	21–9	May 2024	ITF Villach, Austria	W35	Clay	(Czech Republic) Aneta Kučmová	(Czech Republic) Karolína Kubáňová (Czech Republic) Renata Voráčová	6–1, 6–4
Loss	21–10	May 2024	ITF Annenheim, Austria	W35	Clay	(Latvia) Daniela Vismane	(Finland) Laura Hietaranta (Estonia) Elena Malõgina	6–3, 3–6, [6–10]
Win	22–10	May 2024	ITF Klagenfurt, Austria	W35	Clay	(Czech Republic) Aneta Kučmová	(Australia) Kaylah McPhee (Slovakia) Nina Vargová	6–3, 7–5
Win	23–10	Jul 2024	ITF Stuttgart-Vaihingen, Germany	W35	Clay	(Romania) Cristina Dinu	(Netherlands) Jasmijn Gimbrère (Netherlands) Stéphanie Visscher	3–6, 6–4, [10–4]
Win	24–10	Jul 2024	ITF Horb am Neckar, Germany	W35	Clay	(Czech Republic) Aneta Kučmová	Alina Charaeva (Japan) Yuki Naito	6–4, 6–7^{(3)}, [10–2]
Win	25–10	Jan 2025	Porto Indoor, Portugal	W75	Hard (i)	(Hong Kong) Eudice Chong	(Germany) Noma Noha Akugue (Czech Republic) Tereza Valentová	7–6^{(5)}, 6–1
Win	26–10	May 2025	ITF Warmbad Villach, Austria	W35	Clay	(Slovenia) Dalila Jakupović	(Netherlands) Jasmijn Gimbrère (United States) Rasheeda McAdoo	6–4, 6–4
Loss	26–11	Jun 2025	ITF Tarvisio, Italy	W35	Clay	(Slovenia) Dalila Jakupović	(Czech Republic) Aneta Kučmová (Poland) Daria Kuczer	6–2, 1–6, [11–13]
Win	27–11	Jul 2025	ITS Cup, Czech Republic	W75	Clay	(Slovenia) Dalila Jakupović	(India) Rutuja Bhosale (China) Zheng Wushuang	6–4, 6–1
Loss	27–12	Aug 2025	Ladies Open Amstetten, Austria	W75	Clay	(Slovenia) Dalila Jakupović	(China) Feng Shuo (Chinese Taipei) Liang En-shuo	6–4, 4–6, [0–10]
Loss	27–13	Sep 2025	Lisboa Belém Open, Portugal	W100	Clay	(Slovenia) Dalila Jakupović	(Portugal) Matilde Jorge (Switzerland) Naïma Karamoko	2–6, 3–6
Win	28–13	Oct 2025	Les Franqueses del Vallès, Spain	W100	Hard	(Slovenia) Dalila Jakupović	(Switzerland) Susan Bandecchi (United Kingdom) Freya Christie	6–4, 2–6, [10–6
Win	29–13	Nov 2025	Trnava Indoor, Slovakia	W75	Hard	(Czech Republic) Aneta Kučmová	(Slovakia) Katarína Kužmová (Slovakia) Nina Vargová	6–4, 6–3
Win	30–13	Apr 2026	Wiesbaden Open, Germany	W100	Clay	(Croatia) Lucija Ćirić Bagarić	(Czech Republic) Lucie Havlíčková (Czech Republic) Anna Sisková	5–7, 7–6^{(3)}, [10–5]

== Junior Circuit finals ==
Legend
Category G1
Category G2
Category G3
Category G4
Category G5

=== Singles (4–2) ===
Result	W–L	Date	Tournament	Grade	Surface	Opponent	Score
Win	1–0	Jul 2016	Véska, Czech Republic	G4	Clay	(Italy) Rosanna Maffei	6–4, 7–6^{(7–5)}
Win	2–0	Sep 2016	Mostar, Bosnia & Herzegovina	G4	Clay	(Bosnia and Herzegovina) Milica Bojić	6–2, 6–4
Loss	2–1	Jul 2017	Plzeň, Czech Republic	G2	Clay	(Poland) Anna Hertel	6–2, 4–6, 4–6
Loss	2–2	Jul 2017	Wels, Austria	G1	Clay	(Italy) Elisabetta Cocciaretto	2–6, 3–6
Win	3–2	Sep 2017	Pančevo, Serbia	G2	Clay	(Italy) Melania Delai	6–2, 4–6, 6–3
Win	4–2	Sep 2017	Novi Sad, Serbia	G2	Clay	(United Kingdom) Anna Loughlan	6–2, 6–2

=== Doubles (5–6) ===
Result	W–L	Date	Tournament	Grade	Surface	Partner	Opponents	Score
Loss	0–1	Jan 2015	Otočec, Slovenia	G4	Carpet (i)	(Slovenia) Tina Cvetkovič	(Slovenia) Veronika Erjavec (Slovenia) Nika Zupančič	7–5, 5–7, [7–10]
Loss	0–2	Aug 2015	Domžale, Slovenia	G4	Clay	(Slovenia) Tina Cvetkovič	(Serbia) Olga Danilović (Croatia) Iva Zelić	3–6, 6–3, [6–10]
Win	1–2	Sep 2015	Veli Lošinj, Croatia	G4	Clay	(Slovenia) Kaja Juvan	(Slovenia) Anja Gal (Slovenia) Nika Zupančič	6–1, 6–0
Loss	1–3	Oct 2015	Mostar, Bosnia & Herzegovina	G4	Clay	(Romania) Mihaela Mărculescu	(Slovenia) Nika Kožar (Slovenia) Kristina Novak	6–3, 2–6, [2–10]
Win	2–3	Dec 2015	Zagreb, Croatia	G4	Hard (i)	(Slovenia) Veronika Erjavec	(Russia) Sofiya Gaisina (United Kingdom) Lauryn John-Baptiste	6–4, 6–2
Win	3–3	May 2016	Villach, Austria	G2	Clay	(Slovenia) Veronika Erjavec	(United Kingdom) Francesca Jones (Poland) Katarzyna Kubicz	6–3, 6–1
Loss	3–4	Jun 2016	Bytom, Poland	G2	Clay	(Czech Republic) Karolína Beránková	(Russia) Natalia Boltinskaya (Ukraine) Marta Kostyuk	2–6, 4–6
Win	4–4	Nov 2016	Otočec, Slovenia	G4	Carpet (i)	(Croatia) Iva Zelić	(Croatia) Ana Biškić (Slovenia) Veronika Erjavec	6–4, 5–7, [10–4]
Win	5–4	May 2017	Hódmezővásárhely, Hungary	G2	Clay	(Slovenia) Veronika Erjavec	(Republic of Ireland) Georgia Drummy (United States) Katya Townsend	6–1, 6–2
Loss	5–5	Sep 2017	Pančevo, Serbia	G2	Clay	(Turkey) Selin Övünç	(Romania) Selma Cadar (Russia) Sofya Treshcheva	4–6, 6–1, [2–10]
Loss	5–6	Mar 2018	Vrsar, Croatia	G1	Clay	(Italy) Elisabetta Cocciaretto	(Romania) Andreea Prisăcariu (Italy) Isabella Tcherkes Zade	6–1, 3–6, [4–10]

== National representation ==
=== Fed Cup ===
Radišić made her debut for Slovenia Fed Cup team in 2018, while the team was competing in the Europe/Africa Zone Group I.

Group membership World Group World Group Play-off World Group II World Group II Play-off Europe/Africa Group (2–2)	Matches by surface Hard (2–2) Clay (0–0)	Matches by type Singles (0–1) Doubles (2–1)	Matches by setting Indoors (2–2)

==== Singles (0–1) ====
Edition	Stage	Date	Location	Against	Surface	Opponent	W/L	Score
2020 Fed Cup; Europe/Africa Zone Group I	Pool B	6 February 2020	Esch-sur-Alzette, Luxembourg	Poland	Hard (i)	Iga Świątek	L	2–6, 1–6

==== Doubles (2–1) ====
Edition	Stage	Date	Location	Against	Surface	Partner	Opponents	W/L	Score
2018 Fed Cup; Europe/Africa Zone Group I	Pool C	9 February 2018	Tallinn, Estonia	Sweden	Hard (i)	Kaja Juvan	Mirjam Björklund; Jacqueline Cabaj Awad	W	6–3, 6–7^{(5–7)}, 6–2
2019 Fed Cup; Europe/Africa Zone Group I	Pool A	7 February 2019	Bath, Great Britain	Hungary	Hard (i)	Nina Potočnik	Réka Luca Jani; Adrienn Nagy	L	6–7^{(3–7)}, 6–4, 2–6
2019 Fed Cup; Europe/Africa Zone Group I	Pool A	8 February 2019	Bath, Great Britain	Greece	Hard (i)	Nina Potočnik	Valentini Grammatikopoulou; Maria Sakkari	W	w/o
