= Alice Tubello =

French tennis player (born 2001)

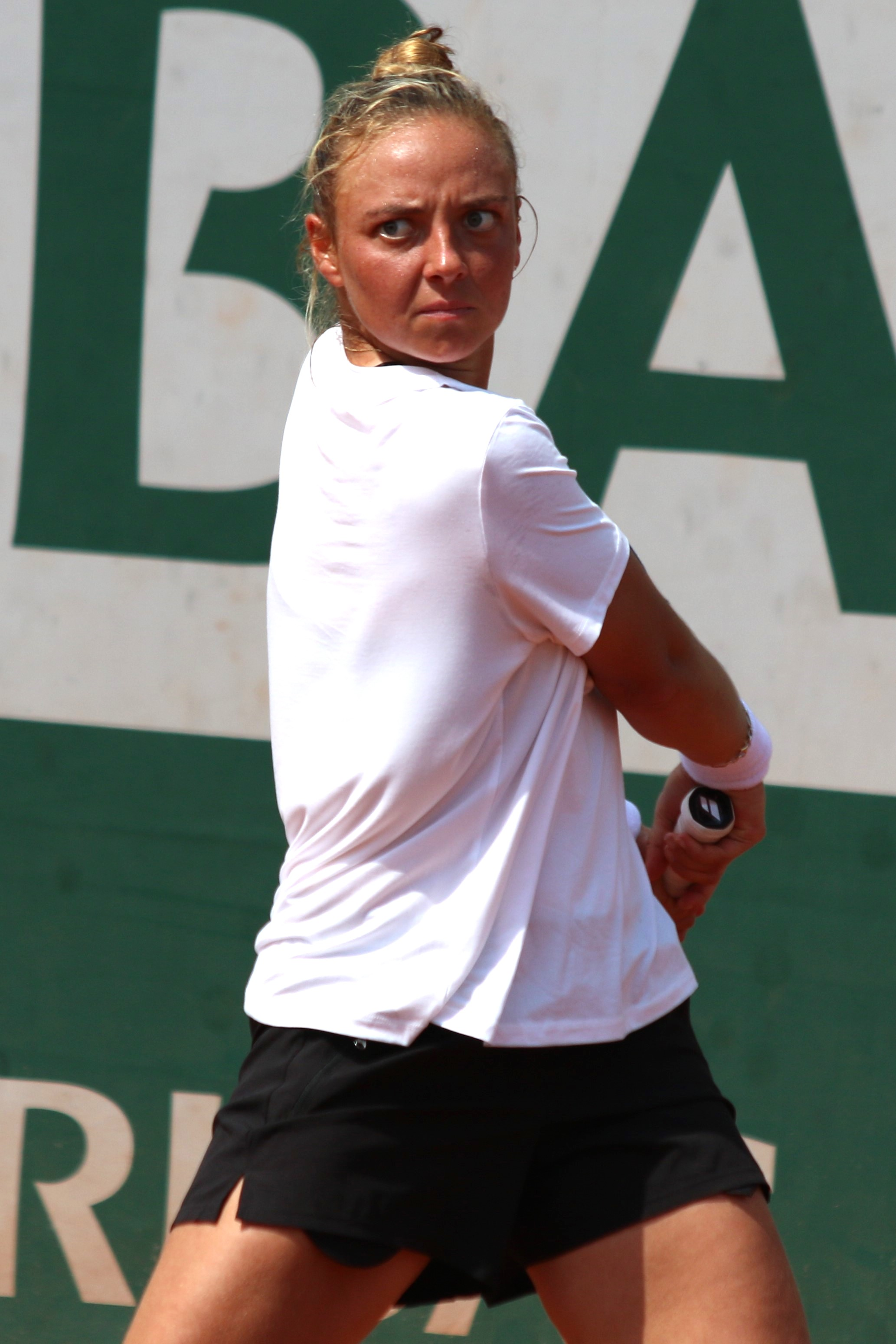
- Tubello at the 2023 French Open
- Country (sports): France
- Residence: Saint-Genès-Champanelle, France
- Born: 30 January 2001 (age 25) Clermont-Ferrand, France
- Prize money: $423,153

Singles
- Career record: 264–131
- Career titles: 1 WTA 125, 10 ITF
- Highest ranking: No. 139ª (16 November 2026)
- Current ranking: No. 139ª (16 November 2026)

Grand Slam singles results
- Australian Open: Q1 (2025, 2026)
- French Open: 1R (2026)
- Wimbledon: Q1 (2026)
- US Open: Q1 (2026)

Doubles
- Career record: 41–48
- Career titles: 3 ITF
- Highest ranking: No. 460 (12 June 2023)
- Current ranking: No. 566 (16 November 2026)

Grand Slam doubles results
- French Open: 1R (2023)
- Last updated on: 02 November 2026.

Alice Tubello (born 30 January 2001) is a French professional tennis player. She has a career-high singles ranking of world No. 139 by the Women's Tennis Association (WTA), achieved on 16 November 2026, and a career-high doubles ranking of No. 460, achieved on 12 June 2023. She made her Grand Slam singles main-draw debut at the 2026 French Open, receiving a wildcard.

== Early life ==
Alice Tubello was born on 30 January 2001 in Clermont-Ferrand, France, and grew up in nearby Saint-Genès-Champanelle, in the Puy-de-Dôme department. Both of her parents practiced judo, and she has an older brother who also played tennis. She began playing tennis at around the age of four at a local club in Saint-Genès-Champanelle, following the example of her brother. The tennis courts were located near their primary school.

At the age of six, Tubello joined the Stade Clermontois tennis club, where she trained for six years. She subsequently followed her coach to the CUC for one year before taking private lessons and joining the tennis section of AS Montferrand in 2016. As a teenager, she followed an adapted educational programme with private tutors to accommodate her tennis training. Alongside tennis, she practiced several other sports, including judo, boxing and triathlon. She later pursued a degree in sports sciences at Clermont Auvergne University, combining university studies with her professional tennis career.

== Career ==
=== 2024: ITF consistency ===
After slow start in her senior career, in 2024, Tubello had a breakthrough year, marking her best season to date. Competing primarily on the ITF Circuit, she showcased improvement and consistency by capturing multiple titles and rarely being eliminated before quarterfinals. During the March–April period, she has made 14 consecutive wins that give her two titles in Le Havre (a W15 tournament) and Bujumbura (a W35 tournament), respectively. Her winning streak then was stopped with the loss at another W35 tournament in Bujumbura. A month later, she has won another W35 title, this time in Sopó. In late June, she reached final at the W35 Périgueux tournament.

As a wildcard player, she attempted the French Open qualifying and reached second round of qualifying. The first round match win was her first at any Grand Slam.

=== 2026: Grand Slam tournament debut ===
Tubello was given a wildcard entry to make her major main-draw debut at the French Open, losing to Donna Vekić in the first round.

== WTA 125 finals ==
=== Singles: 1 (title) ===
Result	W–L	Date	Tournament	Surface	Opponent	Score
Win	1–0	Oct 2026	Curitiba Open, Brazil	Clay	(Austria) Julia Grabher	3–6, 7–6^{(7–5)}, 7–6^{(7–2)}

== ITF Circuit finals ==
=== Singles: 17 (10 titles, 7 runner-ups) ===
Legend
W50 tournaments
W35 tournaments
W15 tournaments

Result	W–L	Date	Tournament	Tier	Surface	Opponent	Score
Loss	0–1	Jan 2019	ITF Fort-de-France, Martinique	W15	Hard	(Montenegro) Vladica Babić	4–6, 2–6
Win	1–1	Jun 2022	ITF Monastir, Tunisia	W15	Hard	(Japan) Honoka Kobayashi	6–3, 7–6^{(4)}
Win	2–1	Jun 2022	ITF Norges-la-Ville, France	W15	Hard	(France) Ines Nicault	4–6, 6–0, 6–3
Win	3–1	Mar 2024	ITF Le Havre, France	W15	Clay (i)	(France) Tiantsoa Rakotomanga Rajaonah	6–3, 1–6, 6–3
Win	4–1	Apr 2024	ITF Bujumbura, Burundi	W35	Clay	(Russia) Ksenia Laskutova	6–2, 6–7^{(5)}, 6–3
Loss	4–2	Apr 2024	ITF Bujumbura, Burundi	W35	Clay	(Poland) Weronika Falkowska	4–6, 1–6
Win	5–2	May 2024	ITF Sopó, Colombia	W35	Clay	(Argentina) Jazmín Ortenzi	6–4, 6–2
Loss	5–3	Jun 2024	ITF Périgueux, France	W35	Clay	(France) Emma Léné	6–3, 4–6, 4–6
Loss	5–4	Aug 2024	ITF Chacabuco, Argentina	W35	Clay	(Peru) Lucciana Pérez Alarcón	2–6, 4–6
Win	6–4	Aug 2024	ITF Arequipa, Peru	W35	Clay	(Argentina) Julieta Lara Estable	6–3, 6–1
Loss	6–5	Aug 2025	ITF Erwitte, Germany	W35	Clay	(Germany) Tessa Brockmann	3–6, 3–6
Win	7–5	Aug 2025	ITF Wanfercée-Baulet, Belgium	W15	Clay	(Belgium) Amélie Van Impe	6–7^{(4)}, 6–3, 6–2
Win	8–5	Sep 2025	ITF Saint-Palais-sur-Mer, France	W50	Clay	(Russia) Julia Avdeeva	7–6^{(5)}, 6–2
Loss	8–6	Mar 2026	ITF San Gregorio, Italy	W35	Clay	(Italy) Lisa Pigato	2–6, 4–6
Win	9–6	Mar 2026	ITF San Gregorio, Italy	W35	Clay	(Spain) Ángela Fita Boluda	6–2, 6–3
Win	10–6	Apr 2026	ITF Bujumbura, Burundi	W50	Clay	(Burundi) Sada Nahimana	6–1, 6–3
Loss	10–7	Jun 2026	ITF Stuttgart-Vaihingen, Germany	W50	Clay	(Ukraine) Anastasiia Sobolieva	6–3, 6–7^{(5)}, 2–6

=== Doubles: 3 (3 titles) ===
Legend
W60 tournaments
W35 tournaments
W15 tournaments

Result	W–L	Date	Tournament	Tier	Surface	Partner	Opponents	Score
Win	1–0	Jan 2019	ITF Fort-de-France, Martinique	W15	Hard	(Greece) Eleni Kordolaimi	(United Kingdom) Emily Appleton (United States) Dalayna Hewitt	6–3, 5–7, [10–4]
Win	2–0	Mar 2023	ITF Pretoria, South Africa	W60	Hard	(Japan) Mai Hontama	(Belgium) Sofia Costoulas (Italy) Dalila Spiteri	6–3, 6–3
Win	3–0	Oct 2025	ITF Lagos, Portugal	W35	Hard	(Italy) Vittoria Paganetti	(France) Yasmine Mansouri (Serbia) Elena Milovanović	7–5, 3–6, [10–4]
