= Porto Women's Indoor ITF =

ITF Women's Tour
- Event name: Porto Women's Indoor ITF
- Location: Porto, Portugal
- Venue: Complexo Desportivo do Monte Aventino
- Category: ITF Women's World Tennis Tour
- Surface: Hard / Indoor
- Draw: 32S/32Q/16D
- Prize money: $60,000 / $40,000

The Porto Women's Indoor ITF are tournaments for professional female tennis players played on indoor hard courts. The events are classified as $60,000 and $40,000 ITF Women's World Tennis Tour tournaments and have been held in Porto, Portugal, since 2022.

== Past finals ==
=== Singles ===
Year	Champion	Runner-up	Score
2026 (3)	(Netherlands) Anouk Koevermans	(United Kingdom) Harriet Dart	6–2, 1–0 ret.
2026 (2)	(United States) Fiona Crawley	(Bulgaria) Elizara Yaneva	6–7^{(4–7)}, 6–3, 6–4
2026 (1)	(Turkey) Ayla Aksu	(Bulgaria) Elizara Yaneva	7–5, 6–4
2025 (3)	(Canada) Victoria Mboko	(United Kingdom) Harriet Dart	6–1, 6–1
2025 (2)	(Lithuania) Justina Mikulskytė	(United States) Tyra Caterina Grant	6–7^{(2–7)}, 6–3, 6–2
2025 (1)	(Czech Republic) Tereza Valentová	(Germany) Nastasja Schunk	6–3, 6–4
2024 (3)	(Hungary) Anna Bondár	(Germany) Noma Noha Akugue	7–6^{(7–4)}, 6–2
2024 (2)	(Slovakia) Rebecca Šramková	(Spain) Jéssica Bouzas Maneiro	6–7^{(4–7)}, 7–5, 6–1
2024 (1)	(Spain) Jéssica Bouzas Maneiro	(Poland) Maja Chwalińska	3–6, 6–0, 6–4
2023 (2)	(Belgium) Greet Minnen	(Croatia) Tara Würth	6–2, 6–2
2023 (1)	(Switzerland) Céline Naef	(Italy) Lucrezia Stefanini	6–2, 6–4
2022 (2)	(Japan) Moyuka Uchijima	(France) Léolia Jeanjean	6–3, 6–1
2022 (1)	(Austria) Julia Grabher	(Poland) Maja Chwalińska	6–3, 6–7^{(2–7)}, 7–5

=== Doubles ===
Year	Champions	Runners-up	Score
2026 (3)	(Italy) Deborah Chiesa (Switzerland) Naïma Karamoko	(Italy) Angelica Moratelli (Italy) Camilla Rosatello	6–2, 6–2
2026 (2)	(Spain) Ángela Fita Boluda (Switzerland) Ylena In-Albon	(Germany) Noma Noha Akugue (Bosnia and Herzegovina) Anita Wagner	6–4, 7–6^{(7–5)}
2026 (1)	(Portugal) Francisca Jorge (Portugal) Matilde Jorge	(Ukraine) Nadiia Kolb (Slovenia) Kristina Novak	6–2, 6–4
2025 (3)	(Portugal) Francisca Jorge (Portugal) Matilde Jorge	(Chinese Taipei) Cho Yi-tsen (Chinese Taipei) Cho I-hsuan	0–6, 7–6^{(7–4)}, [10–8]
2025 (2)	(Portugal) Francisca Jorge (Portugal) Matilde Jorge	(Croatia) Lucija Ćirić Bagarić (Slovenia) Kristina Novak	6–3, 6–1
2025 (1)	(Hong Kong) Eudice Chong (Slovenia) Nika Radišić	(Germany) Noma Noha Akugue (Czech Republic) Tereza Valentová	7–6^{(7–5)}, 6–1
2024 (3)	(Hungary) Anna Bondár (Switzerland) Céline Naef	(Portugal) Francisca Jorge (Portugal) Matilde Jorge	6–4, 3–6, [11–9]
2024 (2)	(Slovenia) Veronika Erjavec (Czech Republic) Dominika Šalková	(Portugal) Francisca Jorge (Portugal) Matilde Jorge	4–6, 7–5, [10–8]
2024 (1)	(United Kingdom) Sarah Beth Grey (United Kingdom) Olivia Nicholls	(Portugal) Francisca Jorge (Portugal) Matilde Jorge	4–6, 6–3, [10–6]
2023 (2)	(Georgia (country)) Ekaterine Gorgodze (Spain) Leyre Romero Gormaz	(Portugal) Matilde Jorge (Croatia) Tara Würth	6–4, 2–6, [11–9]
2023 (1)	(Switzerland) Céline Naef (Belgium) Yanina Wickmayer	(France) Alice Robbe (Croatia) Tara Würth	6–1, 6–4
2022 (2)	(Greece) Valentini Grammatikopoulou (Netherlands) Quirine Lemoine	(Hungary) Adrienn Nagy (India) Prarthana Thombare	6–2, 6–0
2022 (1)	(Greece) Valentini Grammatikopoulou (Netherlands) Quirine Lemoine	(France) Audrey Albié (France) Léolia Jeanjean	6–2, 6–3
