= Nauhany Vitória Leme da Silva =

Brazilian tennis player

- Full name: Nauhany Vitória Leme da Silva
- Country (sports): Brazil
- Residence: São Paulo, Brazil
- Born: March 13, 2010 (age 16) São Paulo, Brazil
- Plays: Right (two-handed backhand)
- Prize money: $24,420

Singles
- Career record: 30–15
- Career titles: 1 ITF
- Highest ranking: No. 594 (24 August 2026)
- Current ranking: No. 660 (14 September 2026)

Grand Slam singles results
- Australian Open Junior: 1R (2025)
- French Open Junior: 3R (2026)
- Wimbledon Junior: 3R (2025)
- US Open Junior: QF (2026)

Doubles
- Career record: 16–8
- Career titles: 2 ITF
- Highest ranking: No. 434 (14 September 2026)
- Current ranking: No. 434 (14 September 2026)

Grand Slam doubles results
- Australian Open Junior: 1R (2025)
- French Open Junior: 2R (2026)
- Wimbledon Junior: F (2026)
- US Open Junior: 2R (2026)
- Last updated on: 16 September 2026.

Nauhany Vitória Leme da Silva (born 13 March 2010), also known as just Naná, is a Brazilian tennis player. She has a career-high WTA singles ranking of No. 594, achieved on 24 August 2026 and a best in doubles of No. 434, reached on 14 September 2026. She represents Brazil in the Billie Jean King Cup since 2025.

On the professional level, Silva has won three ITF World Tour titles, one in singles and another two in doubles. She became the first player born in 2010 to win a match on the WTA Tour, doing so at the 2025 SP Open.

On the ITF Junior Circuit, she reached a combined ranking of world No. 7, on 8 June 2026.

== Career ==
=== 2024: Junior Circuit and first professional matches ===
In April 2024, Silva won a Roland Garros junior event, winning entry into the girls' tournament at the 2024 Roland Garros. She also won a junior tournament in Santa Cruz, Bolivia.

In August 2024, Silva became the youngest Brazilian tennis player to compete and win a match in a professional main draw, at 14 years old.

In October 2024, she won an Australian Open Junior Series tournament, winning a place in the main draw of the 2025 Australian Open girls' event. The next month, she played for Brazil in the junior Billie Jean King Cup.

In 2024, Silva became the youngest tennis player in the WTA rankings. She entered the world rankings for the first time at 14 years, 6 months, and 10 days, ranking 1291st.

=== 2025: WTA Tour debut and first pro titles in doubles and singles; BJK Cup debut ===
Silva participated in all four junior Grand Slam tournaments in 2025, making it to the third round at the girls' singles event at Wimbledon. She also won a junior event held in Asunción, Paraguay.

In September 2025, Silva made her WTA Tour debut in both singles and doubles after receiving a wildcard into the main draw of the first edition of her home tournament, the SP Open at the WTA 250 level in São Paulo. She won her opening singles match against compatriot Carolina Alves, becoming the first player born in 2010 to win a main-draw match on the WTA Tour. She then lost in the second round to the second seed Solana Sierra.

In doubles, alongside fellow Brazilian Victoria Luiza Barros, she lost her opening match against Anna Rogers and Janice Tjen.

In October 2025, Silva won the doubles title of the W35 tournament at the Paineiras do Morumby club in São Paulo, Brazil. She played alongside fellow Brazilian Ana Candiotto and defeated the duo of Argentine Jazmín Ortenzi and Colombian María Paulina Pérez in the final. This was the first professional title of her career.

The following week, at a W15 tournament in the city of São João da Boa Vista, Silva reached her first singles final, in which she won against Chilean player Antonia Vergara Rivera in two sets: her first professional singles title.

In November 2025, Silva made her Billie Jean King Cup debut for Brazil in Hobart, Australia. She opened Brazil's Group E play-off tie against Portugal with a straight set victory over world No. 255 Matilde Jorge, earning the first point of the encounter.

In the next day, Silva faced world No. 95 Kimberly Birrell in Brazil's decisive tie against hosts Australia. She won the second set but was defeated 6–4, 3–6, 6–1, as Australia secured a 2–0 victory to qualify for the 2026 Billie Jean King Cup Qualifiers and Brazil was knocked back to the zonal group.

Also in November, she reached her second W15 singles final in Ribeirão Preto, but was defeated by compatriot Luiza Fullana, in straight sets.

=== 2026: Milestones and titles at the Junior Circuit; Billie Jean King Cup victories, first WTA 1000; Wimbledon final ===
In February 2026, Silva was the singles champion of the ITF J300 Santa Cruz, a South American tournament for the 18-year-old category, played on clay courts in Bolivia. In the final, she defeated the tournament's top seed, Argentine Sol Larraya, 18 years old and ranked 20th.

In doubles, Silva and Larraya won the title defeating another Brazilian, Pietra Rivoli from Rio Grande do Sul, and Argentine Sofia Meabe in two sets. This was the fourth junior doubles title in Silva's career.

In March 2026, Silva played at the Brazil Juniors Cup, a traditional junior tournament held in Porto Alegre, Brazil. Silva was the singles champion, breaking a 35-year drought for Brazilian women, since Eugênia Maia won the singles title at this tournament in 1991. In the final, Silva defeated American Welles Newman in two sets.

Silva was also doubles champion at this tournament. Playing with Sol Larraya, they defeated British Ophelia Davies and Czech Pavla Sviglerova in two sets in the final.

In the following week, Silva participated at both singles and doubles draws of the traditional Banana Bowl junior tournament. In singles, she became the champion defeating compatriot Victoria Luiza Barros in the final in three sets, becoming the first Brazilian woman to win a singles title at this tournament since Roberta Burzagli in 1991. This was also the first time since 1986 that a singles final of the Banana Bowl was contested between two Brazilian women, when Gisele Miró won the title by beating Gisele Faria. In the doubles draw, Silva played once again alongside Sol Larraya and finished runner-up. The title went to the duo of Romanian Maia Burcescu and Jamaican Alyssa James.

In April 2026, Silva represented Brazil at the Billie Jean King Cup in Ibagué, Colombia for the Americas Zone Group I stage of the tournament. Her first match on the opening tie against Chile was played against Fernanda Labraña, whom she beat in straight sets, helping Brazil secure a 3 X 0 victory in the tie.

On the next day, Brazil faced Argentina with Silva playing at both singles and doubles. In the singles match, she faced Luisina Giovannini and won in straight sets. In doubles, Silva played alongside Victória Barros and they won in three sets, facing Julia Riera and Nicole Fossa Huergo. Those victories helped Brasil win the tie by 2 X 1.

On the third day of competition Brazil faced Peru. Silva played against Yleymi Muelle and won in two sets in less than an hour, helping Brazil to win the tie by 3 X 0. With that result, Brazil secured the first place in the group and would face Mexico on the decisive tie.

On the last day, Silva played against Mexico and beat Jessica Gomez in two sets. With an additional win by Gabriela Cé, the team secured the victory over Mexico and advanced to the play-offs of the competition.

Later that month, Silva played in a WTA 1000 event for the first time in her career, when she received a wildcard for the qualifying rounds of the 2026 Madrid Open singles draw.

Silva was defeated in the first qualifying round by Ukraine’s Daria Snigur, ranked world No. 101, 7–5, 6–1.

In June, Silva participated in the exhibition tournament Giorgio Armani Tennis Classic and reached the final, where she was defeated by French Ksenia Efremova in straight sets.

In July, competing alongside Victoria Luiza Barros as the top seeds, Silva ended runner-up in the 2026 Wimbledon Championships girls' doubles competition, after losing in three sets to Jana Kovačková and Kateřina Zajíčková in the final.

In the same month, Silva played in the Vacaria Open, a W75 tournament in Brazil. In the singles draw, she reached the quarterfinals but lost in two sets against Argentine Julia Riera. In doubles, partnering fellow São Paulo native Laura Pigossi, Silva reached her first final on a W75 tournament and won the title by defeating Carolina Martins and Isabella Barrera Aguirre, in three sets. This was her second professional doubles title and biggest title to date.

== Personal life ==
Silva has cited Beatriz Haddad Maia, Aryna Sabalenka, Elena Rybakina and João Fonseca to be her main sporting influences on tennis. Outside tennis, she has cited that Rebeca Andrade is one of her main sporting influences.

== WTA 125 finals ==
=== Doubles: 1 (runner-up) ===
Result	W–L	Date	Tournament	Surface	Partner	Opponents	Score
Loss	0–1	Oct 2026	Curitiba Open, Brazil	Clay	(Brazil) Laura Pigossi	(Slovenia) Dalila Jakupović (Slovenia) Nika Radišić	4–6, 2–6

== ITF Circuit finals ==
=== Singles: 2 (1 title, 1 runner-up) ===
Legend W15 tournaments (1–1)	Finals by surface Clay (1–1)

Result	W–L	Date	Tournament	Tier	Surface	Opponent	Score
Win	1–0	Oct 2025	ITF São João da Boa Vista, Brazil	W15	Clay	(Chile) Antonia Vergara Rivera	6–4, 6–3
Loss	1–1	Nov 2025	ITF Ribeirão Preto, Brazil	W15	Clay	(Brazil) Luiza Fullana	1–6, 4–6

=== Doubles: 2 (2 titles) ===
Legend
W35 tournaments (1–0)
W75 tournaments (1–0)

Result	W–L	Date	Tournament	Tier	Surface	Partner	Opponents	Score
Win	1–0	Sep 2025	São Paulo Internacional, Brazil	W35	Clay	(Brazil) Ana Candiotto	(Argentina) Jazmín Ortenzi (Colombia) María Paulina Pérez	6–4, 6–2
Win	2–0	Jul 2026	Vacaria Open, Brazil	W75	Clay (i)	(Brazil) Laura Pigossi	(Brazil) Carolina Martins (United States) Isabella Barrera	4–6, 6–2, [10–6]

== Junior Grand Slam tournament finals ==
=== Doubles: 1 (runner-up) ===
Result	Year	Tournament	Surface	Partner	Opponents	Score
Loss	2026	Wimbledon	Grass	(Brazil) Victoria Luiza Barros	(Czech Republic) Jana Kovačková (Czech Republic) Kateřina Zajíčková	6–7^{(7–9)}, 7–6^{(7–5)}, [6–10]

== Exhibition matches ==
=== Singles ===
Result	Date	Tournament	Surface	Opponent	Score
Loss	Jun 2026	Giorgio Armani Tennis Classic, London, UK	Grass	(France) Ksenia Efremova	3–6, 4–6
