= 2025 SP Open =

Women's tennis championship in São Paulo, Brazil

- Date: 8–14 September 2025
- Edition: 1st
- Category: WTA 250
- Draw: 32S / 16Q / 16D
- Surface: Hard
- Location: São Paulo, Brazil
- Venue: Parque Villa-Lobos

Champions

Singles
- (France) Tiantsoa Rakotomanga Rajaonah

Doubles
- (Hungary) Tímea Babos / (Brazil) Luisa Stefani
- SP Open

The 2025 SP Open was the first edition of the professional women's tennis tournament that debuted as part of the WTA 250 series. It was held in São Paulo, Brazil, at the Parque Villa-Lobos on hardcourts, from 8 to 14 September 2025. The event featured a 32-player singles main draw, a 16-player qualifying draw, and a 16-team doubles draw.

== Champions ==
=== Singles ===
- (France) Tiantsoa Rakotomanga Rajaonah def. (Indonesia) Janice Tjen, 6–3, 6–4

=== Doubles ===
- (Hungary) Tímea Babos / (Brazil) Luisa Stefani def. (Brazil) Ingrid Martins / (Brazil) Laura Pigossi, 4–6, 6–3, [10–4]

== Singles main-draw entrants ==
=== Seeds ===
Country	Player	Rank^{†}	Seed
BRA	Beatriz Haddad Maia	22	1
ARG	Solana Sierra	74	2
PHI	Alexandra Eala	75	3
AUS	Ajla Tomljanović	79	4
MEX	Renata Zarazúa	82	5
GBR	Francesca Jones	89	6
FRA	Léolia Jeanjean	93	7
HUN	Panna Udvardy	134	8

- Rankings are as of 25 August 2025.

=== Other entrants ===
The following players received wildcards into the main draw:

- (Brazil) Victoria Luiza Barros
- (Brazil) Ana Candiotto
- (Brazil) Luiza Fullana
- (Brazil) Nauhany Vitória Leme da Silva

The following players received entry using a protected ranking:

- (Turkey) Berfu Cengiz
- Vitalia Diatchenko

The following players received entry from the qualifying draw:

- (France) Yasmine Mansouri
- (Slovakia) Martina Okáľová
- (Mexico) Victoria Rodríguez
- (Italy) Miriana Tona

=== Withdrawals ===
- (United States) Hailey Baptiste → replaced by (Argentina) Jazmín Ortenzi
- (United Kingdom) Jodie Burrage → replaced by (Brazil) Carolina Alves
- (United States) Louisa Chirico → replaced by (United States) Anna Rogers
- (Poland) Linda Klimovičová → replaced by (Ukraine) Valeriya Strakhova

== Doubles main-draw entrants ==
=== Seeds ===
Country	Player	Country	Player	Rank^{1}	Seed
HUN	Tímea Babos	BRA	Luisa Stefani	49	1
GBR	Emily Appleton	NED	Isabelle Haverlag	161	2
BRA	Ingrid Martins	BRA	Laura Pigossi	176	3
ESP	Yvonne Cavallé Reimers	ESP	Alicia Herrero Liñana	240	4

- ^{1} Rankings as of 25 August 2025.

=== Other entrants ===
The following pairs received wildcards into the doubles main draw:

- (Brazil) Ana Candiotto / (Brazil) Beatriz Haddad Maia
- (Brazil) Victoria Luiza Barros / (Brazil) Nauhany Vitória Leme da Silva

The following pair received entry as alternates:

- (France) Tiantsoa Rakotomanga Rajaonah / (Netherlands) Lian Tran

=== Withdrawals ===
- (Argentina) Julia Riera / (Mexico) Ana Sofía Sánchez → replaced by (France) Tiantsoa Rakotomanga Rajaonah / (Netherlands) Lian Tran
