= 2025 SP Open – Doubles =

Doubles
- 2025 SP Open

Final
- Champions: (Hungary) Tímea Babos (Brazil) Luisa Stefani
- Runners-up: (Brazil) Ingrid Martins (Brazil) Laura Pigossi
- Score: 4–6, 6–3, [10–4]

Details
- Draw: 16 (2 WC)
- Seeds: 4

Events
| Singles | Doubles |
- SP Open

Tímea Babos and Luisa Stefani defeated Ingrid Martins and Laura Pigossi in the final, 4–6, 6–3, [10–4] to win the doubles tennis title at the 2025 SP Open.

This was the first edition of the tournament.

== Seeds ==
1. (Hungary) Tímea Babos / (Brazil) Luisa Stefani (champions)
2. (United Kingdom) Emily Appleton / (Netherlands) Isabelle Haverlag (semifinals)
3. (Brazil) Ingrid Martins / (Brazil) Laura Pigossi (final)
4. (Spain) Yvonne Cavallé Reimers / (Spain) Alicia Herrero Liñana (quarterfinals)

== Draw ==
Key

- Q = Qualifier
- WC = Wild card
- LL = Lucky loser
- Alt = Alternate
- ITF = ITF entry
- PR = Protected ranking
- SR = Special ranking
- SE = Special exempt
- JE = Junior exempt
- JR = Junior Accelerator Programme entrant
- CO = College Accelerator Programme entrant
- NG = Next Gen Accelerator Program entrant
- w/o = Walkover
- r = Retired
- d = Defaulted

=== Draw ===
First round
1 | (Hungary) T Babos (Brazil) L Stefani | 6 | 6
(United Kingdom) A Barnett (France) E Lechemia | 4 | 4
(Argentina) S Sierra (Mexico) R Zarazúa | 7^{8} | 1 | [10]
(Ukraine) M Kolb (Ukraine) N Kolb | 6^{6} | 6 | [8]
4 | (Spain) Y Cavallé Reimers (Spain) A Herrero Liñana | 6 | 5 | [10]
(Netherlands) A Hartono (India) P Thombare | 1 | 7 | [8]
WC | (Brazil) VL Barros (Brazil) NV Leme da Silva | 4 | 5
(United States) A Rogers (Indonesia) J Tjen | 6 | 7
(Argentina) J Riera (Mexico) AS Sánchez | 2 | 0^{r}
(France) L Jeanjean (Mexico) V Rodríguez | 6 | 4
WC | (Brazil) A Candiotto (Brazil) B Haddad Maia | 3 | 6^{5}
3 | (Brazil) I Martins (Brazil) L Pigossi | 6 | 7^{7}
(United States) H Giavara (United States) R McAdoo | 2 | 5
Alt | (France) T Rakotomanga Rajaonah (Netherlands) L Tran | 6 | 7
(United Kingdom) M Brooks (United States) J Failla | 3 | 1
2 | (United Kingdom) E Appleton (Netherlands) I Haverlag | 6 | 6

Quarterfinals
1 | (Hungary) T Babos (Brazil) L Stefani | 6 | 6
(Argentina) S Sierra (Mexico) R Zarazúa | 2 | 2
4 | (Spain) Y Cavallé Reimers (Spain) A Herrero Liñana | 1 | 0
(United States) A Rogers (Indonesia) J Tjen | 6 | 6
(France) L Jeanjean (Mexico) V Rodríguez
3 | (Brazil) I Martins (Brazil) L Pigossi | w/o
Alt | (France) T Rakotomanga Rajaonah (Netherlands) L Tran | 0 | 1
2 | (United Kingdom) E Appleton (Netherlands) I Haverlag | 6 | 6

Semifinals
1 | (Hungary) T Babos (Brazil) L Stefani | 6 | 6
(United States) A Rogers (Indonesia) J Tjen | 3 | 2
3 | (Brazil) I Martins (Brazil) L Pigossi | 6 | 4 | [10]
2 | (United Kingdom) E Appleton (Netherlands) I Haverlag | 1 | 6 | [6]

Final
1 | (Hungary) T Babos (Brazil) L Stefani | 4 | 6 | [10]
3 | (Brazil) I Martins (Brazil) L Pigossi | 6 | 3 | [4]
