= 2026 SP Open – Doubles =

Doubles
- 2026 SP Open

Final
- Champions: (Canada) Gabriela Dabrowski (Brazil) Luisa Stefani
- Runners-up: (United States) Anna Rogers (United States) Allura Zamarripa
- Score: 6–3, 3–6, [10–7]
- Date: 21 September 2026

Details
- Draw: 16 (2 WC)
- Seeds: 4

Events
| Singles | Doubles |
- SP Open

Gabriela Dabrowski and Luisa Stefani defeated Anna Rogers and Allura Zamarripa in the final, 6–3, 3–6, [10–7] to win the doubles tennis title at the 2026 SP Open.

Tímea Babos and Stefani were the reigning champions, but Babos took an extended break from tennis after the 2026 Australian Open.

== Seeds ==
1. (Canada) Gabriela Dabrowski / (Brazil) Luisa Stefani (champions)
2. (Ukraine) Valeriya Strakhova / Anastasia Tikhonova (semifinals)
3. Ekaterina Ovcharenko / (Brazil) Laura Pigossi (first round)
4. (United States) Anna Rogers / (United States) Allura Zamarripa (final)

== Draw ==
Key

- Q = Qualifier
- WC = Wild card
- LL = Lucky loser
- Alt = Alternate
- ITF = ITF entry
- PR = Protected ranking
- SR = Special ranking
- SE = Special exempt
- JE = Junior exempt
- JR = Junior Accelerator Programme entrant
- CO = College Accelerator Programme entrant
- NG = Next Gen Accelerator Program entrant
- w/o = Walkover
- r = Retired
- d = Defaulted

=== Draw ===
First round
1 | (Canada) G Dabrowski (Brazil) L Stefani | 6 | 6
WC | (Brazil) R Pereira (Brazil) M Souza | 0 | 1
(Spain) K Quevedo (Czech Republic) D Šalková | 6 | 6^{6} | [10]
(Argentina) J Riera (Argentina) S Sierra | 3 | 7^{8} | [6]
3 | E Ovcharenko (Brazil) L Pigossi | 3 | 1
(United States) M Stoiana (Czech Republic) V Valdmannová | 6 | 6
(Brazil) A Candiotto (Brazil) L Fullana | 5 | 4
(China) Y Dang (China) X You | 7 | 6
(Brazil) I Martins (Argentina) J Ortenzi | 6 | 6
(Mexico) MF Navarro Oliva (Mexico) V Rodríguez | 0 | 3
PR | (Czech Republic) M Bayerlová (Belgium) K Zimmermann | 5 | 3
4 | (United States) A Rogers (United States) A Zamarripa | 7 | 6
(United States) R McAdoo (Australia) A Osborne | 6 | 6^{2} | [6]
WC | (Brazil) VL Barros (Brazil) NV Leme da Silva | 3 | 7^{7} | [10]
(Lithuania) J Mikulskytė (United States) A Smith | 6^{2} | 6^{5}
2 | (Ukraine) V Strakhova; A Tikhonova | 7^{7} | 7^{7}

Quarterfinals
1 | (Canada) G Dabrowski (Brazil) L Stefani | w/o
(Spain) K Quevedo (Czech Republic) D Šalková
(United States) M Stoiana (Czech Republic) V Valdmannová | 6 | 3 | [7]
(China) Y Dang (China) X You | 4 | 6 | [10]
(Brazil) I Martins (Argentina) J Ortenzi | 3 | 1
4 | (United States) A Rogers (United States) A Zamarripa | 6 | 6
WC | (Brazil) VL Barros (Brazil) NV Leme da Silva | 2 | 5
2 | (Ukraine) V Strakhova; A Tikhonova | 6 | 7

Semifinals
1 | (Canada) G Dabrowski (Brazil) L Stefani | 3 | 6 | [11]
(China) Y Dang (China) X You | 6 | 3 | [9]
4 | (United States) A Rogers (United States) A Zamarripa | 6 | 6
2 | (Ukraine) V Strakhova; A Tikhonova | 3 | 0

Final
1 | (Canada) G Dabrowski (Brazil) L Stefani | 6 | 3 | [10]
4 | (United States) A Rogers (United States) A Zamarripa | 3 | 6 | [7]
