= 2026 SP Open =

Women's tennis championship in São Paulo, Brazil

- Date: 14–21 September 2026 (Note: Due to rain, the finals could not be played on Sunday and were played on Monday instead)
- Edition: 2nd
- Category: WTA 250
- Draw: 32S / 16Q / 16D
- Prize money: $283,347
- Surface: Hard
- Location: São Paulo, Brazil
- Venue: Parque Villa-Lobos

Champions

Singles
- (Spain) Kaitlin Quevedo

Doubles
- (Canada) Gabriela Dabrowski / (Brazil) Luisa Stefani
- SP Open

The 2026 SP Open was a professional women's tennis tournament. It was the second edition of the event and a WTA tournament on the 2026 WTA Tour. It was held in São Paulo, Brazil, at the Parque Villa-Lobos on hardcourts, from 14 to 21 September 2026 (it was originally scheduled to end on 20 September but was postponed to one day due to bad weather).

== Champions ==
=== Singles ===
- (Spain) Kaitlin Quevedo def. (Argentina) Nadia Podoroska, 4–6, 6–4, 6–2

=== Doubles ===
- (Canada) Gabriela Dabrowski / (Brazil) Luisa Stefani def. (United States) Anna Rogers / (United States) Allura Zamarripa, 6–3, 3–6, [10–7]

== Singles main-draw entrants ==
=== Seeds ===
Country	Player	Rank^{†}	Seed
~~CAN~~	~~Leylah Fernandez~~	~~33~~	~~1~~
ESP	Paula Badosa	87	2
ARG	Solana Sierra	91	3
FRA	Anna Blinkova	95	4
GER	Eva Lys	98	5
ESP	Jéssica Bouzas Maneiro	105	6
ESP	Kaitlin Quevedo	107	7
ARM	Alina Charaeva	108	8
LAT	Darja Semeņistaja	109	9

- Rankings are as of 31 August 2026.

=== Other entrants ===
The following players received wildcards into the main draw:

- (Brazil) Carolina Alves
- (Brazil) Victoria Luiza Barros
- (Brazil) Gabriela Cé
- (Brazil) Nauhany Vitória Leme da Silva

The following players received entry using a protected ranking:

- (Argentina) Nadia Podoroska
- (Australia) Astra Sharma

The following players received entry from the qualifying draw:

- (Canada) Cadence Brace
- ~~(United States) Whitney Osuigwe~~
- (France) Chloé Paquet
- (China) You Xiaodi

The following players received entry as lucky losers:

- (Japan) Hayu Kinoshita
- (Lithuania) Justina Mikulskytė
- Anastasia Tikhonova

=== Withdrawals ===
- (Canada) Leylah Fernandez → replaced by (Lithuania) Justina Mikulskytė (LL)
- (France) Léolia Jeanjean → replaced by (Japan) Hayu Kinoshita (LL)
- (United States) Whitney Osuigwe → replaced by Anastasia Tikhonova (LL)
- (Kazakhstan) Yulia Putintseva → replaced by (Netherlands) Suzan Lamens
- (Switzerland) Jil Teichmann → replaced by (Australia) Astra Sharma
- (Czech Republic) Tereza Valentová → replaced by (Czech Republic) Vendula Valdmannová
- (China) Yuan Yue → replaced by (Armenia) Elina Avanesyan

== Doubles main-draw entrants ==
=== Seeds ===
Country	Player	Country	Player	Rank^{1}	Seed
CAN	Gabriela Dabrowski	BRA	Luisa Stefani	7	1
UKR	Valeriya Strakhova		Anastasia Tikhonova	167	2
	Ekaterina Ovcharenko	BRA	Laura Pigossi	206	3
USA	Anna Rogers	USA	Allura Zamarripa	229	4

- ^{1} Rankings as of 31 August 2026.

=== Other entrants ===
The following pairs received wildcards into the doubles main draw:

- (Brazil) Victoria Luiza Barros / (Brazil) Nauhany Vitória Leme da Silva
- (Brazil) Rebeca Pereira / (Brazil) Marjorie Souza
