= 2026 SP Open – Singles =

Singles
- 2026 SP Open

Final
- Champion: (Spain) Kaitlin Quevedo
- Runner-up: (Argentina) Nadia Podoroska
- Score: 4–6, 6–4, 6–2
- Date: 21 September 2026

Details
- Draw: 32 (4 Q / 4 WC)
- Seeds: 8

Events
Singles	Doubles
- SP Open

Kaitlin Quevedo defeated Nadia Podoroska in the final, 4–6, 6–4, 6–2 to win the singles tennis title at the 2026 SP Open. It was her first WTA Tour title. Podoroska was the first Argentinian woman to reach a WTA Tour final since Paula Ormaechea in 2013.

Tiantsoa Rakotomanga Rajaonah was the reigning champion, but did not participate this year.

The second-round match between Alina Charaeva and Elina Avanesyan was the first WTA Tour main-draw match between two players representing Armenia in the Open Era.

== Seeds ==
1. (Canada) Leylah Fernandez (withdrew)
2. (Spain) Paula Badosa (semifinals)
3. (Argentina) Solana Sierra (second round)
4. (France) Anna Blinkova (semifinals)
5. (Germany) Eva Lys (second round)
6. (Spain) Jéssica Bouzas Maneiro (first round)
7. (Spain) Kaitlin Quevedo (champion)
8. (Armenia) Alina Charaeva (quarterfinals)
9. (Latvia) Darja Semeņistaja (second round)

== Draw ==
Key

- Q = Qualifier
- WC = Wild card
- LL = Lucky loser
- Alt = Alternate
- ITF = ITF entry
- PR = Protected ranking
- SR = Special ranking
- SE = Special exempt
- JE = Junior exempt
- JR = Junior Accelerator Programme entrant
- CO = College Accelerator Programme entrant
- NG = Next Gen Accelerator Program entrant
- w/o = Walkover
- r = Retired
- d = Defaulted

=== Finals ===
Semifinals
7	(Spain) Kaitlin Quevedo	6	2	6
4	(France) Anna Blinkova	4	6	4
PR	(Argentina) Nadia Podoroska	6	6
2	(Spain) Paula Badosa	3	4

Final
7	(Spain) Kaitlin Quevedo	4	6	6
PR	(Argentina) Nadia Podoroska	6	4	2

=== Top half ===
First round
9	(Latvia) D Semeņistaja	7	6
LL	(Japan) H Kinoshita	5	4
(Serbia) T Kostović	6	6
WC	(Brazil) VL Barros	2	4
WC	(Brazil) NV Leme da Silva	5	6	7
PR	(Australia) A Sharma	7	4	5
LL	A Tikhonova	0	2
7	(Spain) K Quevedo	6	6
4	(France) A Blinkova	6	6
(United States) CYS Lee	1	3
(Czech Republic) V Valdmannová	2	6	6
(Brazil) L Pigossi	6	1	1
(Argentina) J Riera	2	4
(Armenia) E Avanesyan	6	6
Q	(China) X You	6	6^{5}	3
8	(Armenia) A Charaeva	3	7^{7}	6

Second round
9	(Latvia) D Semeņistaja	4	1
(Serbia) T Kostović	6	6
WC	(Brazil) NV Leme da Silva	2	1
7	(Spain) K Quevedo	6	6
4	(France) A Blinkova	6	6
(Czech Republic) V Valdmannová	3	0
(Armenia) E Avanesyan	2	3
8	(Armenia) A Charaeva	6	6

Quarterfinals
(Serbia) T Kostović	3	4
7	(Spain) K Quevedo	6	6
4	(France) A Blinkova	6	7
8	(Armenia) A Charaeva	4	5

Semifinals
7	(Spain) K Quevedo	6	2	6
4	(France) A Blinkova	4	6	4

=== Bottom half ===
First round
5	(Germany) E Lys	6	5	7
WC	(Brazil) G Cé	1	7	5
(Italy) L Stefanini	3	4
PR	(Argentina) N Podoroska	6	6
(Netherlands) S Lamens	3	7^{7}	6
WC	(Brazil) C Alves	6	6^{2}	2
Q	(Canada) C Brace	4	6	1
3	(Argentina) S Sierra	6	3	6
6	(Spain) J Bouzas Maneiro	5	1
(Czech Republic) D Šalková	7	6
(United States) M Stoiana	6	7
(United States) C Liu	3	5
(Argentina) J Ortenzi	6	6
Q	(France) C Paquet	3	2
LL	(Lithuania) J Mikulskytė	3	2
2	(Spain) P Badosa	6	6

Second round
5	(Germany) E Lys	5	2
PR	(Argentina) N Podoroska	7	6
(Netherlands) S Lamens	6	6
3	(Argentina) S Sierra	3	2
(Czech Republic) D Šalková	6^{5}	1
(United States) M Stoiana	7^{7}	6
(Argentina) J Ortenzi	6	2	2
2	(Spain) P Badosa	4	6	6

Quarterfinals
PR	(Argentina) N Podoroska	7^{7}	3	6
(Netherlands) S Lamens	6^{5}	6	3
(United States) M Stoiana	4	2
2	(Spain) P Badosa	6	6

Semifinals
PR	(Argentina) N Podoroska	6	6
2	(Spain) P Badosa	3	4

== Qualifying ==
=== Seeds ===
1. (China) You Xiaodi (qualified)
2. (Japan) Hayu Kinoshita (qualifying competition, lucky loser)
3. (Lithuania) Justina Mikulskytė (qualifying competition, lucky loser)
4. (United States) Whitney Osuigwe (qualified, withdrew)
5. (Argentina) Martina Capurro Taborda (first round)
6. (Canada) Cadence Brace (qualified)
7. Anastasia Tikhonova (qualifying competition, lucky loser)
8. (Australia) Lizette Cabrera (first round)

=== Qualifiers ===
1. (China) You Xiaodi
2. (Canada) Cadence Brace
3. (France) Chloé Paquet
4. ~~(United States) Whitney Osuigwe~~

=== Lucky losers ===
1. (Japan) Hayu Kinoshita
2. (Lithuania) Justina Mikulskytė
3. Anastasia Tikhonova

=== Qualifying draw ===
==== First qualifier ====
First round
1	(China) You Xiaodi	6	6
WC	(Brazil) Luiza Fullana	2	1
(Argentina) Victoria Bosio	7	6^{4}	6
8	(Australia) Lizette Cabrera	5	7^{7}	3

Qualifying competition
1	(China) You Xiaodi	6	7
(Argentina) Victoria Bosio	3	5

==== Second qualifier ====
First round
2	(Japan) Hayu Kinoshita	6	1	6
(Mexico) Victoria Rodríguez	4	6	2
WC	(Brazil) Ana Candiotto	3	4
6	(Canada) Cadence Brace	6	6

Qualifying competition
2	(Japan) Hayu Kinoshita	5	6^{9}
6	(Canada) Cadence Brace	7	7^{11}

==== Third qualifier ====
First round
3	(Lithuania) Justina Mikulskytė	6	6
(Chile) Antonia Vergara Rivera	2	3
(France) Chloé Paquet	7	1	6
5	(Argentina) Martina Capurro Taborda	5	6	2

Qualifying competition
3	(Lithuania) Justina Mikulskytė	3	4
(France) Chloé Paquet	6	6

==== Fourth qualifier ====
First round
4	(United States) Whitney Osuigwe	6	6
(Chile) Fernanda Labraña	3	0
Alt	(Argentina) María Florencia Urrutia	2	1
7	Anastasia Tikhonova	6	6

Qualifying competition
4	(United States) Whitney Osuigwe	6	6
7	Anastasia Tikhonova	2	2
