= 2026 French Open – Women's singles =

Tennis championship

Women's singles
- 2026 French Open

Final
- Champion: Mirra Andreeva
- Runner-up: (Poland) Maja Chwalińska
- Score: 6–3, 6–2
- Date: 6 June 2026

Details
- Draw: 128 (16Q / 8WC)
- Seeds: 32

Events
Singles	men	women		boys	girls
Doubles	men	women	mixed	boys	girls
WC Singles	men	women	quad	boys	girls
WC Doubles	men	women	quad	boys	girls

Qualification
Singles	men	women
- French Open

Mirra Andreeva defeated Maja Chwalińska in the final, 6–3, 6–2 to win the women's singles tennis title at the 2026 French Open. It was her first major title. Andreeva was the youngest woman, at 19 years, 39 days old, to win the tournament since Monica Seles in 1992.

Coco Gauff was the defending champion, but lost in the third round to Anastasia Potapova. This marked her first defeat at the event since 2021 to an opponent other than Iga Świątek.

Chwalińska was the second qualifier in the Open Era to reach a major final, after Emma Raducanu at the 2021 US Open. She was the third woman to reach the French Open final on her tournament debut, after Evonne Goolagong in 1971 and Chris Evert in 1973. She was also the third Polish major finalist in the Open Era, following Agnieszka Radwańska and Świątek. Ranked No. 114, Chwalińska became the lowest-ranked finalist in French Open history.

Marta Kostyuk became the first Ukrainian woman to reach the semifinals at the French Open, defeating compatriot Elina Svitolina in the first all-Ukrainian major quarterfinal in the Open Era. She was the third Ukrainian major semifinalist in the Open Era, after Svitolina and Dayana Yastremska. With her third-round win, Sorana Cîrstea became the oldest woman, at 36 years, 52 days old, in the Open Era to score a double bagel in a singles major main-draw match, overtaking Victoria Azarenka from the previous year. By reaching the quarterfinals for the first time since 2009, Cîrstea set the longest gap between a player's first two quarterfinals at a women's singles major in the Open Era.

Aryna Sabalenka retained the world No. 1 singles ranking after Elena Rybakina lost in the second round. Her loss to Diana Shnaider in the quarterfinals guaranteed a first-time major champion. This was the first major since the 1977 French Open to have no former major champions reach the semifinals of either the women's or the men's singles events.

== Seeds ==
1. Aryna Sabalenka (quarterfinals)
2. (Kazakhstan) Elena Rybakina (second round)
3. (Poland) Iga Świątek (fourth round)
4. (United States) Coco Gauff (third round)
5. (United States) Jessica Pegula (first round)
6. (United States) Amanda Anisimova (third round)
7. (Ukraine) Elina Svitolina (quarterfinals)
8. Mirra Andreeva (champion)
9. (Canada) Victoria Mboko (third round)
10. (Czech Republic) Karolína Muchová (third round)
11. (Switzerland) Belinda Bencic (fourth round)
12. (Czech Republic) Linda Nosková (first round)
13. (Italy) Jasmine Paolini (second round)
14. Ekaterina Alexandrova (first round)
15. (Ukraine) Marta Kostyuk (semifinals)
16. (Japan) Naomi Osaka (fourth round)
17. (United States) Iva Jovic (third round)
18. (Romania) Sorana Cîrstea (quarterfinals)
19. (United States) Madison Keys (fourth round)
20. Liudmila Samsonova (first round)
21. (Denmark) Clara Tauson (first round)
22. Anna Kalinskaya (quarterfinals)
23. (Belgium) Elise Mertens (second round)
24. (Canada) Leylah Fernandez (first round)
25. Diana Shnaider (semifinals)
26. (United States) Hailey Baptiste (second round, retired)
27. (Czech Republic) Marie Bouzková (third round)
28. (Austria) Anastasia Potapova (fourth round)
29. (Latvia) Jeļena Ostapenko (second round)
30. (United States) Ann Li (second round)
31. (Spain) Cristina Bucșa (first round)
32. (China) Wang Xinyu (second round)

== Draw ==
Key

- Q = Qualifier
- WC = Wild card
- LL = Lucky loser
- Alt = Alternate
- ITF = ITF entry
- PR = Protected ranking
- SR = Special ranking
- SE = Special exempt
- JE = Junior exempt
- JR = Junior Accelerator Programme entrant
- CO = College Accelerator Programme entrant
- NG = Next Gen Accelerator Program entrant
- w/o = Walkover
- r = Retired
- d = Defaulted

=== Finals ===
Quarterfinals
1	Aryna Sabalenka	6	5	0
25	Diana Shnaider	3	7	6
22	Anna Kalinskaya	6^{3}	3
Q	(Poland) Maja Chwalińska	7^{7}	6
7	(Ukraine) Elina Svitolina	3	6	2
15	(Ukraine) Marta Kostyuk	6	2	6
8	Mirra Andreeva	6	6
18	(Romania) Sorana Cîrstea	0	3

Semifinals
25	Diana Shnaider	6^{4}	4
Q	(Poland) Maja Chwalińska	7^{7}	6
15	(Ukraine) Marta Kostyuk	1	3
8	Mirra Andreeva	6	6

Final
Q	(Poland) Maja Chwalińska	3	2
8	Mirra Andreeva	6	6

=== Top half ===
==== Section 1 ====
First round
1	A Sabalenka	6	6
(Spain) J Bouzas Maneiro	4	2
Q	(Czech Republic) L Fruhvirtová	4	3
(France) E Jacquemot	6	6
(Australia) D Kasatkina	6	6
(Turkey) Z Sönmez	4	4
Q	(Switzerland) S Bandecchi	6	2	6
31	(Spain) C Bucșa	4	6	4
17	(United States) I Jovic	6	6
(Philippines) A Eala	4	2
(United States) E Navarro	6	6
(Indonesia) J Tjen	4	3
(Croatia) D Vekić	6	6
WC	(France) A Tubello	3	2
(Germany) L Siegemund	3	6^{3}
16	(Japan) N Osaka	6	7^{7}

Second round
1	A Sabalenka	7	6
(France) E Jacquemot	5	2
(Australia) D Kasatkina	7	7^{13}
Q	(Switzerland) S Bandecchi	5	6^{11}
17	(United States) I Jovic	6	6
(United States) E Navarro	0	3
(Croatia) D Vekić	6^{1}	4
16	(Japan) N Osaka	7^{7}	6

Third round
1	A Sabalenka	6	7
(Australia) D Kasatkina	0	5
17	(United States) I Jovic	6^{5}	7^{7}	4
16	(Japan) N Osaka	7^{7}	6^{3}	6

Fourth round
1	A Sabalenka	7	6
16	(Japan) N Osaka	5	3

==== Section 2 ====
First round
9	(Canada) V Mboko	6	6
(Czech Republic) N Bartůňková	1	2
(Switzerland) S Waltert	4	6^{4}
(Czech Republic) K Siniaková	6	7^{7}
(Croatia) A Ružić	3	6	6
Q	(United States) A Krueger	6	2	2
(Belgium) H Vandewinkel	3	0
19	(United States) M Keys	6	6
25	D Shnaider	6	6
(Mexico) R Zarazúa	4	1
Q	(China) H Guo	6	6^{1}	5
(United States) M Kessler	4	7^{7}	7
Q	E Pridankina	1	2
(Ukraine) O Oliynykova	6	6
(Australia) K Birrell	1	6	6
5	(United States) J Pegula	6	3	3

Second round
9	(Canada) V Mboko	5	6	6
(Czech Republic) K Siniaková	7	4	2
(Croatia) A Ružić	4	4
19	(United States) M Keys	6	6
25	D Shnaider	7^{7}	6
(United States) M Kessler	6^{3}	1
(Ukraine) O Oliynykova	6	0	7^{10}
(Australia) K Birrell	3	6	6^{5}

Third round
9	(Canada) V Mboko	3	7	5
19	(United States) M Keys	6	5	7
25	D Shnaider	7	6
(Ukraine) O Oliynykova	5	1

Fourth round
19	(United States) M Keys	3	6	0
25	D Shnaider	6	3	6

==== Section 3 ====
First round
4	(United States) C Gauff	6	6
(United States) T Townsend	4	0
(Hungary) D Gálfi	5	4
Q	(Egypt) M Sherif	7	6
WC	(United States) A Urhobo	4	6	4
(United Kingdom) K Boulter	6	4	6
(Australia) M Joint	1	2
28	(Austria) A Potapova	6	6
22	A Kalinskaya	6	6
(France) L Boisson	2	2
Q	A Korneeva	6	6
(Italy) E Cocciaretto	3	3
(Australia) T Gibson	6	4	1
(Kazakhstan) Y Putintseva	4	6	6
(Colombia) C Osorio	6	6
14	E Alexandrova	2	4

Second round
4	(United States) C Gauff	6	6
Q	(Egypt) M Sherif	3	2
(United Kingdom) K Boulter	7	4	2
28	(Austria) A Potapova	5	6	6
22	A Kalinskaya	7^{7}	6
Q	A Korneeva	6^{2}	4
(Kazakhstan) Y Putintseva	5	7^{8}	5
(Colombia) C Osorio	7	6^{6}	7

Third round
4	(United States) C Gauff	6	6^{1}	4
28	(Austria) A Potapova	4	7^{7}	6
22	A Kalinskaya	6	0	6
(Colombia) C Osorio	3	6	2

Fourth round
28	(Austria) A Potapova	4	6	6^{7}
22	A Kalinskaya	6	2	7^{10}

==== Section 4 ====
First round
12	(Czech Republic) L Nosková	5	6^{3}
(Greece) M Sakkari	7	7^{7}
Q	(United States) C Liu	3	6	4
(Japan) M Uchijima	6	0	1^{r}
Q	(Poland) M Chwalińska	6	6
(China) Q Zheng	4	0
(Germany) T Maria	5	0
23	(Belgium) E Mertens	7	6
30	(United States) A Li	6	6
(China) S Zhang	4	2
PR	(Ukraine) A Kalinina	6	2	4
(France) D Parry	0	6	6
(Austria) J Grabher	6	6
Q	(Slovakia) R Šramková	2	2
WC	(France) T Rakotomanga Rajaonah	3	1
6	(United States) A Anisimova	6	6

Second round
(Greece) M Sakkari	6^{7}	6	6
Q	(United States) C Liu	7^{9}	3	3
Q	(Poland) M Chwalińska	6	6
23	(Belgium) E Mertens	4	0
30	(United States) A Li	3	4
(France) D Parry	6	6
(Austria) J Grabher	0	0^{r}
6	(United States) A Anisimova	6	0

Third round
(Greece) M Sakkari	6	3	2
Q	(Poland) M Chwalińska	1	6	6
(France) D Parry	6	4	7^{10}
6	(United States) A Anisimova	3	6	6^{3}

Fourth round
Q	(Poland) M Chwalińska	6	6
(France) D Parry	3	2

=== Bottom half ===
==== Section 5 ====
First round
7	(Ukraine) E Svitolina	3	6	7^{10}
(Hungary) A Bondár	6	1	6^{3}
Q	(Spain) K Quevedo	7^{7}	7^{7}
WC	(France) L Jeanjean	6^{5}	6^{2}
PR	(Spain) S Sorribes Tormo	4	2
(Germany) T Korpatsch	6	6
(Austria) L Tagger	3	6	4
32	(China) Xin Wang	6	3	6
21	(Denmark) C Tauson	6	5	2
(Ukraine) D Snigur	3	7	6
(United States) S Kenin	3	3
(United States) P Stearns	6	6
(Australia) A Tomljanović	6	6^{5}	3
(United States) C McNally	3	7^{7}	6
Q	(Austria) S Kraus	2	3
11	(Switzerland) B Bencic	6	6

Second round
7	(Ukraine) E Svitolina	6	6
Q	(Spain) K Quevedo	0	4
(Germany) T Korpatsch	6	2	6
32	(China) Xin Wang	2	6	3
(Ukraine) D Snigur	4	0
(United States) P Stearns	6	6
(United States) C McNally	4	0
11	(Switzerland) B Bencic	6	6

Third round
7	(Ukraine) E Svitolina	6	6
(Germany) T Korpatsch	2	3
(United States) P Stearns	3	3
11	(Switzerland) B Bencic	6	6

Fourth round
7	(Ukraine) E Svitolina	4	6	6
11	(Switzerland) B Bencic	6	4	0

==== Section 6 ====
First round
15	(Ukraine) M Kostyuk	6	6
(Spain) O Selekhmeteva	2	3
(United States) K Volynets	6	6
WC	(France) C Burel	3	1
(Hungary) P Udvardy	0	2
(Switzerland) V Golubic	6	6
(United States) A Parks	6	6
24	(Canada) L Fernandez	4	4
29	(Latvia) J Ostapenko	6	6
(Germany) E Seidel	4	4
(Czech Republic) T Valentová	7	4	6^{9}
(Poland) M Linette	5	6	7^{11}
(Czech Republic) S Bejlek	6	6
Q	(United States) S Stephens	3	2
WC	(Australia) E Jones	1	2
3	(Poland) I Świątek	6	6

Second round
15	(Ukraine) M Kostyuk	6^{4}	6	6
(United States) K Volynets	7^{7}	3	3
(Switzerland) V Golubic	6	6
(United States) A Parks	2	2
29	(Latvia) J Ostapenko	2	6	2
(Poland) M Linette	6	2	6
(Czech Republic) S Bejlek	2	3
3	(Poland) I Świątek	6	6

Third round
15	(Ukraine) M Kostyuk	6	6
(Switzerland) V Golubic	4	3
(Poland) M Linette	4	4
3	(Poland) I Świątek	6	6

Fourth round
15	(Ukraine) M Kostyuk	7	6
3	(Poland) I Świątek	5	1

==== Section 7 ====
First round
8	M Andreeva	6	6
WC	(France) F Ferro	3	3
Q	(Spain) M Bassols Ribera	6	6
(Colombia) E Arango	3	4
(United Kingdom) F Jones	1	7^{7}	6
(Brazil) B Haddad Maia	6	6^{4}	2
Q	(Italy) L Bronzetti	3	1
27	(Czech Republic) M Bouzková	6	6
20	L Samsonova	4	4
PR	(Switzerland) J Teichmann	6	6
(Poland) M Fręch	7^{7}	2
(Romania) E-G Ruse	6^{5}	1^{r}
(Uzbekistan) K Rakhimova	6	4	6
(Romania) J Cristian	3	6	4
A Zakharova	5	2
10	(Czech Republic) K Muchová	7	6

Second round
8	M Andreeva	3	6	6
Q	(Spain) M Bassols Ribera	6	1	1
(United Kingdom) F Jones	0	6^{3}
27	(Czech Republic) M Bouzková	6	7^{7}
PR	(Switzerland) J Teichmann	7	6
(Poland) M Fręch	5	4
(Uzbekistan) K Rakhimova	2	2
10	(Czech Republic) K Muchová	6	6

Third round
8	M Andreeva	6	6
27	(Czech Republic) M Bouzková	4	2
PR	(Switzerland) J Teichmann	6	7
10	(Czech Republic) K Muchová	1	5

Fourth round
8	M Andreeva	6	6
PR	(Switzerland) J Teichmann	3	2

==== Section 8 ====
First round
13	(Italy) J Paolini	7	6
(Ukraine) D Yastremska	5	3
(United Kingdom) E Raducanu	0	6^{4}
(Argentina) S Sierra	6	7^{7}
(Croatia) P Marčinko	3	0
(Germany) E Lys	6	6
WC	(France) K Efremova	3	1
18	(Romania) S Cîrstea	6	6
26	(United States) H Baptiste	6^{7}	7^{8}	6
(Czech Republic) B Krejčíková	7^{9}	6^{6}	2
PR	(Montenegro) D Kovinić	3	1
Q	(China) Xiy Wang	6	6
A Blinkova	3	1
(Ukraine) Y Starodubtseva	6	6
(Slovenia) V Erjavec	2	2
2	(Kazakhstan) E Rybakina	6	6

Second round
13	(Italy) J Paolini	6	4	3
(Argentina) S Sierra	3	6	6
(Germany) E Lys	3	0
18	(Romania) S Cîrstea	6	6
26	(United States) H Baptiste	4^{r}
Q	(China) Xiy Wang	5
(Ukraine) Y Starodubtseva	3	6	7^{10}
2	(Kazakhstan) E Rybakina	6	1	6^{4}

Third round
(Argentina) S Sierra	0	0
18	(Romania) S Cîrstea	6	6
Q	(China) Xiy Wang	6	7
(Ukraine) Y Starodubtseva	3	5

Fourth round
18	(Romania) S Cîrstea	6	7^{7}
Q	(China) Xiy Wang	3	6^{4}

== Championship match statistics ==
Category	Andreeva	(Poland) Chwalińska
1st serve %	38/49 (78%)	37/54 (69%)
1st serve points won	22 of 38 = 58%	17 of 37 = 46%
2nd serve points won	6 of 11 = 55%	3 of 17 = 18%
Total service points won	28 of 49 = 57.14%	20 of 54 = 37.04%
Aces	1	0
Double faults	2	2
Winners	25	10
Unforced errors	26	29
Net points won	10 of 17 = 59%	4 of 7 = 57%
Break points converted	7 of 12 = 58%	3 of 8 = 38%
Return points won	34 of 54 = 63%	21 of 49 = 43%
Total points won	62	41

== Seeded players ==
The following are the seeded players. Seedings are based on WTA rankings as of 18 May 2026. Rankings and points before are as of 25 May 2026.

^{‡}	Champion
^{†}	Runner-up

Seed	Rank	Player	Points before	Points defending	Points won	Points after	Status
1	1	Aryna Sabalenka	9,960	1,300	430	9,090	Quarterfinals lost to Diana Shnaider [25]
2	2	(Kazakhstan) Elena Rybakina	8,313	240	70	8,143	Second round lost to (Ukraine) Yuliia Starodubtseva
3	3	(Poland) Iga Świątek	7,273	780	240	6,733	Fourth round lost to (Ukraine) Marta Kostyuk [15]
4	4	(United States) Coco Gauff	6,749	2,000	130	4,879	Third round lost to (Austria) Anastasia Potapova [28]
5	5	(United States) Jessica Pegula	6,286	240	10	6,056	First round lost to (Australia) Kimberly Birrell
6	6	(United States) Amanda Anisimova	5,958	240	130	5,848	Third round lost to (France) Diane Parry
7	7	(Ukraine) Elina Svitolina	4,315	430	430	4,315	Quarterfinals lost to (Ukraine) Marta Kostyuk [15]
8	8	Mirra Andreeva^{‡}	4,181	430	2,000	5,751	Champion, defeated (Poland) Maja Chwalińska [Q]
9	9	(Canada) Victoria Mboko	3,710	170	130	3,670	Third round lost to (United States) Madison Keys [19]
10	10	(Czech Republic) Karolína Muchová	3,318	10	130	3,438	Third round lost to (Switzerland) Jil Teichmann [PR]
11	11	(Switzerland) Belinda Bencic	3,145	0	240	3,385	Fourth round lost to (Ukraine) Elina Svitolina [7]
12	12	(Czech Republic) Linda Nosková	3,054	10	10	3,054	First round lost to (Greece) Maria Sakkari
13	13	(Italy) Jasmine Paolini	2,787	240	70	2,617	Second round lost to (Argentina) Solana Sierra
14	14	Ekaterina Alexandrova	2,679	240	10	2,449	First round lost to (Colombia) Camila Osorio
15	15	(Ukraine) Marta Kostyuk	2,387	10	780	3,157	Semifinals lost to Mirra Andreeva [8]
16	16	(Japan) Naomi Osaka	2,341	10	240	2,571	Fourth round lost to Aryna Sabalenka [1]
17	17	(United States) Iva Jovic	2,306	70	130	2,366	Third round lost to (Japan) Naomi Osaka [16]
18	18	(Romania) Sorana Cîrstea	1,985	0	430	2,415	Quarterfinals lost to Mirra Andreeva [8]
19	19	(United States) Madison Keys	1,962	430	240	1,772	Fourth round lost to Diana Shnaider [25]
20	27	Liudmila Samsonova	1,635	240	10	1,405	First round lost to (Switzerland) Jil Teichmann [PR]
21	20	(Denmark) Clara Tauson	1,920	130	10	1,800	First round lost to (Ukraine) Daria Snigur
22	24	Anna Kalinskaya	1,792	10	430	2,212	Quarterfinals lost to (Poland) Maja Chwalińska [Q]
23	21	(Belgium) Elise Mertens	1,858	10	70	1,918	Second round lost to (Poland) Maja Chwalińska [Q]
24	22	(Canada) Leylah Fernandez	1,844	10	10	1,844	First round lost to (United States) Alycia Parks
25	23	Diana Shnaider	1,796	70	780	2,506	Semifinals lost to (Poland) Maja Chwalińska [Q]
26	26	(United States) Hailey Baptiste	1,683	240	70	1,513	Second round retired against (China) Wang Xiyu [Q]
27	28	(Czech Republic) Marie Bouzková	1,631	130	130	1,631	Third round lost to Mirra Andreeva [8]
28	30	(Austria) Anastasia Potapova	1,470	70	240	1,640	Fourth round lost to Anna Kalinskaya [22]
29	31	(Latvia) Jeļena Ostapenko	1,464	130	70	1,404	Second round lost to (Poland) Magda Linette
30	29	(United States) Ann Li	1,601	70	70	1,601	Second round lost to (France) Diane Parry
31	33	(Spain) Cristina Bucșa	1,406	10	10	1,406	First round lost to (Switzerland) Susan Bandecchi [Q]
32	34	(China) Wang Xinyu	1,371	10	70	1,431	Second round lost to (Germany) Tamara Korpatsch

== Other entry information ==
=== Wildcards ===
- (France) Clara Burel
- (France) Ksenia Efremova
- (France) Fiona Ferro
- (France) Léolia Jeanjean
- (Australia) Emerson Jones
- (France) Tiantsoa Rakotomanga Rajaonah
- (France) Alice Tubello
- (United States) Akasha Urhobo

=== Protected ranking ===
- (Spain) Sara Sorribes Tormo (85)
- (Switzerland) Jil Teichmann (89)
- (Montenegro) Danka Kovinić (95)
- (Ukraine) Anhelina Kalinina (96)

=== Qualifiers ===
- (Switzerland) Susan Bandecchi
- (Spain) Marina Bassols Ribera
- (Italy) Lucia Bronzetti
- (Poland) Maja Chwalińska
- (Czech Republic) Linda Fruhvirtová
- (China) Guo Hanyu
- Alina Korneeva
- (Austria) Sinja Kraus
- (United States) Ashlyn Krueger
- (United States) Claire Liu
- Elena Pridankina
- (Spain) Kaitlin Quevedo
- (Egypt) Mayar Sherif
- (Slovakia) Rebecca Šramková
- (United States) Sloane Stephens
- (China) Wang Xiyu

=== Withdrawals ===
- † (France) Varvara Gracheva (59) → replaced by (Ukraine) Daria Snigur (101)
- ‡ (United Kingdom) Sonay Kartal (55) → replaced by (Germany) Tamara Korpatsch (102)
- ‡ Veronika Kudermetova (62) → replaced by (United Kingdom) Francesca Jones (103)
- ‡ (Czech Republic) Markéta Vondroušová (46) → replaced by (Slovenia) Veronika Erjavec (104)

† – not on the entry list
‡ – withdrew from entry list
§ – withdrew from main draw

== Notes ==
Preceded by 2026 Australian Open – Women's singles	Grand Slam women's singles	Succeeded by 2026 Wimbledon Championships – Women's singles
