= 2025 SP Open – Singles =

Singles
- 2025 SP Open

Final
- Champion: (France) Tiantsoa Rakotomanga Rajaonah
- Runner-up: (Indonesia) Janice Tjen
- Score: 6–3, 6–4

Details
- Draw: 32 (4 Q / 4 WC)
- Seeds: 8

Events
Singles	Doubles
- SP Open

Tiantsoa Rakotomanga Rajaonah defeated Janice Tjen in the final, 6–3, 6–4 to win the singles tennis title at the 2025 SP Open. She saved three match points en route to her first WTA Tour title, in her first-round match against Ana Sofía Sánchez, after being down 0–5 in the final set. Rakotomanga Rajaonah was the youngest Frenchwoman to win a WTA Tour title since Océane Dodin in 2016. Tjen was the first Indonesian to reach a WTA Tour singles final since Angelique Widjaja in 2002.

With her first-round match win, Nauhany Vitória Leme da Silva became the first player born in the 2010s to win a WTA Tour main draw match.

This was the first edition of the tournament.

== Seeds ==
1. (Brazil) Beatriz Haddad Maia (quarterfinals)
2. (Argentina) Solana Sierra (quarterfinals)
3. (Philippines) Alexandra Eala (quarterfinals)
4. (Australia) Ajla Tomljanović (first round, retired)
5. (Mexico) Renata Zarazúa (semifinals)
6. (United Kingdom) Francesca Jones (semifinals)
7. (France) Léolia Jeanjean (first round)
8. (Hungary) Panna Udvardy (quarterfinals)

== Draw ==
Key

- Q = Qualifier
- WC = Wild card
- LL = Lucky loser
- Alt = Alternate
- ITF = ITF entry
- PR = Protected ranking
- SR = Special ranking
- SE = Special exempt
- JE = Junior exempt
- JR = Junior Accelerator Programme entrant
- CO = College Accelerator Programme entrant
- NG = Next Gen Accelerator Program entrant
- w/o = Walkover
- r = Retired
- d = Defaulted

=== Finals ===
Semifinals
5	(Mexico) Renata Zarazúa	3	2
(France) Tiantsoa Rakotomanga Rajaonah	6	6
(Indonesia) Janice Tjen	7^{7}	6
6	(United Kingdom) Francesca Jones	6^{0}	3

Final
(France) Tiantsoa Rakotomanga Rajaonah	6	6
(Indonesia) Janice Tjen	3	4

=== Top half ===
First round
1	(Brazil) B Haddad Maia	6	6
Q	(Italy) M Tona	1	1
(United States) E Mandlik	6	3	4
(Brazil) L Pigossi	2	6	6
(Argentina) J Ortenzi	1	2
PR	(Turkey) B Cengiz	6	6
WC	(Brazil) L Fullana	2	1
5	(Mexico) R Zarazúa	6	6
4	(Australia) A Tomljanović	4	2^{r}
Q	(Mexico) V Rodríguez	6	4
(Mexico) AS Sánchez	4	6	6^{7}
(France) T Rakotomanga Rajaonah	6	4	7^{9}
(Ukraine) V Strakhova	3	7	0
WC	(Brazil) A Candiotto	6	5	6
(United States) A Rogers	2	3
8	(Hungary) P Udvardy	6	6

Second round
1	(Brazil) B Haddad Maia	6	6
(Brazil) L Pigossi	1	4
PR	(Turkey) B Cengiz	4	4
5	(Mexico) R Zarazúa	6	6
Q	(Mexico) V Rodríguez	5	1
(France) T Rakotomanga Rajaonah	7	6
WC	(Brazil) A Candiotto	3	3
8	(Hungary) P Udvardy	6	6

Quarterfinals
1	(Brazil) B Haddad Maia	6^{5}	3
5	(Mexico) R Zarazúa	7^{7}	6
(France) T Rakotomanga Rajaonah	6	6
8	(Hungary) P Udvardy	2	4

Semifinals
5	(Mexico) R Zarazúa	3	2
(France) T Rakotomanga Rajaonah	6	6

=== Bottom half ===
First round
7	(France) L Jeanjean	2	3
(Indonesia) J Tjen	6	6
(Australia) Ar Rodionova	5	4
Q	(Slovakia) M Okáľová	7	6
(Argentina) J Riera	6	7^{7}
PR	V Diatchenko	3	6^{1}
Q	(France) Y Mansouri	0	2
3	(Philippines) A Eala	6	6
6	(United Kingdom) F Jones	4	6	6
(Israel) L Glushko	6	2	3
WC	(Brazil) VL Barros	3	4
(United States) W Osuigwe	6	6
(Brazil) C Alves	7^{7}	2	0
WC	(Brazil) NV Leme da Silva	6^{0}	6	6
(Netherlands) A Hartono	6^{4}	3
2	(Argentina) S Sierra	7^{7}	6

Second round
(Indonesia) J Tjen	6	6
Q	(Slovakia) M Okáľová	1	0
(Argentina) J Riera	1	4
3	(Philippines) A Eala	6	6
6	(United Kingdom) F Jones	6	7^{8}
(United States) W Osuigwe	4	6^{6}
WC	(Brazil) NV Leme da Silva	0	4
2	(Argentina) S Sierra	6	6

Quarterfinals
(Indonesia) J Tjen	6	6
3	(Philippines) A Eala	4	1
6	(United Kingdom) F Jones	6	6
2	(Argentina) S Sierra	3	4

Semifinals
(Indonesia) J Tjen	7^{7}	6
6	(United Kingdom) F Jones	6^{0}	3

== Qualifying ==
=== Seeds ===
1. (Netherlands) Lian Tran (qualifying competition)
2. (Spain) Alicia Herrero Liñana (qualifying competition)
3. (United Kingdom) Emily Appleton (first round)
4. (France) Yasmine Mansouri (qualified)
5. (United States) Haley Giavara (first round)
6. (Argentina) Victoria Bosio (first round)
7. (Greece) Martha Matoula (first round)
8. (Italy) Miriana Tona (qualified)

=== Qualifiers ===
1. (Italy) Miriana Tona
2. (Slovakia) Martina Okáľová
3. (Mexico) Victoria Rodríguez
4. (France) Yasmine Mansouri

=== Qualifying draw ===
==== First qualifier ====
First round
1	(Netherlands) Lian Tran	3	6	6
(Bolivia) Noelia Zeballos	6	4	1
WC	(Brazil) Pietra Rivoli	5	6	3
8	(Italy) Miriana Tona	7	2	6

Qualifying competition
1	(Netherlands) Lian Tran	6^{4}	6	4
8	(Italy) Miriana Tona	7^{7}	4	6

==== Second qualifier ====
First round
2	(Spain) Alicia Herrero Liñana	6	4	6
(Greece) Valentini Grammatikopoulou	3	6	3
(Slovakia) Martina Okáľová	6	6
7	(Greece) Martha Matoula	4	2

Qualifying competition
2	(Spain) Alicia Herrero Liñana	5	6	4
(Slovakia) Martina Okáľová	7	2	6

==== Third qualifier ====
First round
3	(United Kingdom) Emily Appleton	5	4
(United States) Victoria Hu	7	6
(Mexico) Victoria Rodríguez	6	6
5	(United States) Haley Giavara	0	1

Qualifying competition
(United States) Victoria Hu	6	1	6^{3}
(Mexico) Victoria Rodríguez	1	6	7^{7}

==== Fourth qualifier ====
First round
4	(France) Yasmine Mansouri	6	6
WC	(Brazil) Ana Cruz	3	2
(Brazil) Thaisa Grana Pedretti	6	7
6	(Argentina) Victoria Bosio	3	5

Qualifying competition
4	(France) Yasmine Mansouri	6	6
(Brazil) Thaisa Grana Pedretti	2	4
