= Nadia Podoroska =

Argentine tennis player (born 1997)

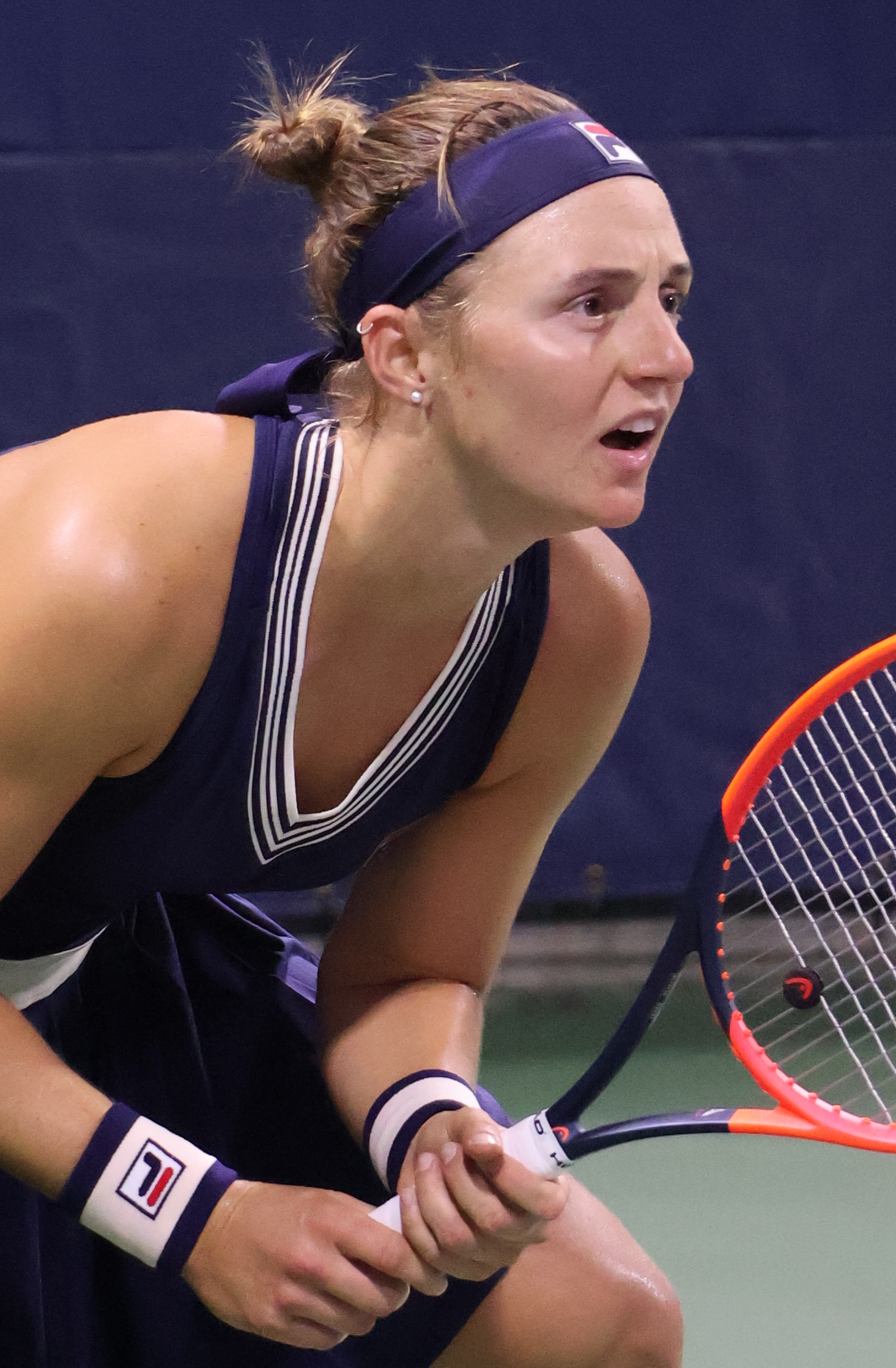
- Podoroska at the 2023 US Open
- Country (sports): Argentina
- Residence: Alicante, Spain
- Born: 10 February 1997 (age 29) Rosario, Argentina
- Height: 1.70 m (5 ft 7 in)
- Plays: Right (two-handed backhand)
- Coach: Emiliano Redondi
- Prize money: $3,341,344

Singles
- Career record: 412–252
- Career titles: 3 WTA 125
- Highest ranking: No. 36 (12 July 2021)
- Current ranking: No. 200 (21 September 2026)

Grand Slam singles results
- Australian Open: 2R (2021, 2023, 2024)
- French Open: SF (2020)
- Wimbledon: 2R (2021, 2023)
- US Open: 2R (2026)

Other tournaments
- Olympic Games: 3R (2021)

Doubles
- Career record: 120–103
- Career titles: 1
- Highest ranking: No. 62 (18 October 2021)
- Current ranking: No. 846 (21 September 2026)

Grand Slam doubles results
- Australian Open: 1R (2021, 2023)
- French Open: SF (2021)
- Wimbledon: 1R (2021, 2023, 2024)
- US Open: 2R (2022)

Other doubles tournaments
- Olympic Games: 2R (2024)

Mixed doubles
- Career record: 1–1

Grand Slam mixed doubles results
- US Open: 2R (2021)

Other mixed doubles tournaments
- Olympic Games: 1R (2024)

Team competitions
- Fed Cup: 12–11
Medal record
Representing Argentina
Pan American Games
Gold medal – first place	2019 Lima	Women's singles
- Last updated on: 21 September 2026.

Nadia Natacha Podoroska (Spanish pronunciation: [ˌnaðja poðoˈɾoska]; born 10 February 1997) is an Argentine professional tennis player. She has a career-high WTA singles ranking of No. 36, achieved on 12 July 2021 and a best in doubles of No. 62, reached on 18 October 2021.

Podoroska has won one WTA Tour title in doubles at 2017 Copa Colsanitas, with Beatriz Haddad Maia. She also earned three WTA Challenger Tour singles trophies and multiple titles on the ITF Circuit.

Podoroska competed for Argentina at the 2020 and 2024 Summer Olympics editions.

== Early life ==
Podoroska was born on 10 February 1997, in Rosario, Santa Fe Province, and grew up in a middle-class family in Fisherton, a neighborhood founded in the late 1880s by railroad workers. She is one of three children born to father Marcelo and mother Irene; she is of Ukrainian descent as her grandparents were Ukrainian, but she does not speak the language at all. Her father was a watchmaker by profession who over the years became a pharmacist, and her mother is also a pharmacist. Nadia was the first in her family to play tennis, a sport that she began practicing at the Fisherton Athletic Club at age five. As a child, she followed the performances of the Argentine male tennis players, especially Guillermo Cañas, although not so much of the national female representatives because they were broadcast infrequently on television. Among the female tennis players, she admired the Williams sisters.

Her first years on the circuit were complicated due to financial difficulties competing internationally. In late 2017, she suffered several injuries that jeopardized her career. Upon her return, she decided to live in Alicante, Spain to settle in Europe and have greater chances of competing weekly. In addition, she began to be trained by Juan Pablo Guzmán and Emiliano Redondi. She added Pedro Merani to her team, with whom she performs mental training based on bompu zen and neuroscience, an aspect that she considered important to change her attitude towards tennis and its matches.

== Career ==
=== 2020: French Open singles semifinal, top 50 & Newcomer of the Year ===
In October, Podoroska became the first qualifier to reach the semifinals of the French Open when she beat third seed Elina Svitolina in the quarterfinals at Roland Garros. Podoroska was named the WTA Newcomer of the Year for her rankings achievement and her solid performance throughout the season.

=== 2021–22: Major doubles semifinal, top 40 & Olympics debuts, hiatus ===
She continued her good form when she reached the quarterfinals of the Yarra Valley Classic by defeating fourth-seeded Petra Kvitová.

In May, at the Italian Open, she defeated 23 times Grand Slam champion and eighth-seeded Serena Williams in the second round. This was her third top-ten win in the last eight months. Williams was playing her 1000th match of her career.

At the French Open, Podoroska lost in the first round to tenth seed Belinda Bencic but reached the semifinals in doubles, partnering with Irina-Camelia Begu for the first time. As a result, she reached the top 40 in singles and No. 69 in doubles for the first time in her career on 14 June 2021.

At the end of the year, following the US Open, Podoroska announced she was withdrawing from the 2022 Australian Open due to struggles with pain that hit her through the whole season, opting to rest and recover until March 2022.

Podoroska returned to competition in June 2022 after ten months of inactivity to participate in the Wimbledon qualifying, and reached the second round. In August, she entered the US Open using protected ranking.

=== 2023–25: Back to top 100, two WTA 1000 third rounds, hiatus ===
Podoroska reached the second round in three of the four Grand Slams except for the 2023 US Open where she lost to Zheng Qinwen in the first round.

In September 2023, she reached her next WTA Tour semifinal after July in Budapest, in the first edition of the Ningbo Open.

She reached the third round of a WTA 1000 for the second time in the season at the 2024 China Open, defeating wildcard Ren Yufei and 25th seed Dayana Yastremska.

=== 2026: Return to Tour, WTA singles final, back to top 200 ===
Podoroska returned to the tour using protected ranking. Ranked No. 317 she reached her first semifinal in three years at the 2026 SP Open with wins over Eva Lys and Suzan Lamens. Next she upset second seed Paula Badosa to reach her first WTA Tour singles final. Podoroska became the first Argentinian to make a WTA final since Paula Ormaechea in 2013. She lost to Kaitlin Quevedo in the final but rose 117 places in the WTA singles rankings to world No. 200 on 21 September 2026.

== National representation ==
Playing for the Argentina Fed Cup team, Podoroska has a win–loss record of 12–11 (as of July 2024).

Podoroska qualified to represent Argentina at the postponed 2020 Tokyo Olympics and won against Yulia Putintseva, who played for Kazakhstan, by retirement to reach the second round, and Russian Ekaterina Alexandrova to reach the third round. Podoroska became the first Argentine woman to reach the round of 16 in Olympic tennis in the 21st century in singles. Only two Argentine female players reached it 25 years ago, Gabriella Sabatini and Inés Gorrochategui in 1996 at Atlanta.

== Personal life ==
Podoroska lives and trains in Alicante, Spain.

In 2022, Podoroska came out as a lesbian, posting her pictures on Instagram with her girlfriend, fellow Argentine tennis player, Guillermina Naya. She confirmed their relationship in an interview with ClayTenis.com.

== Performance timelines ==
Key
W	F	SF	QF	#R	RR	Q#	P#	DNQ	A	Z#	PO	G	S	B	NMS	NTI	P	NH

(W) winner; (F) finalist; (SF) semifinalist; (QF) quarterfinalist; (#R) rounds 4, 3, 2, 1; (RR) round-robin stage; (Q#) qualification round; (P#) preliminary round; (DNQ) did not qualify; (A) absent; (Z#) Davis/Fed Cup Zonal Group (with number indication) or (PO) play-off; (G) gold, (S) silver or (B) bronze Olympic/Paralympic medal; (NMS) not a Masters tournament; (NTI) not a Tier I tournament; (P) postponed; (NH) not held; (SR) strike rate (events won / competed); (W–L) win–loss record.
To avoid confusion and double counting, these charts are updated at the conclusion of a tournament or when the player's participation has ended.

Only main-draw results in WTA Tour, Grand Slam tournaments, Billie Jean King Cup, United Cup, Hopman Cup and Olympic Games are included in win–loss records.

=== Singles ===
Current through the 2026 SP Open.

Tournament	2014	2015	2016	2017	2018	2019	2020	2021	2022	2023	2024	2025	2026	SR	W–L	Win%
Grand Slam tournaments
Australian Open	A	A	A	Q1	A	Q2	A	2R	A	2R	2R	1R	A	0 / 4	3–4	43%
French Open	A	A	A	Q1	A	A	SF	1R	A	2R	1R	A	A	0 / 4	6–4	60%
Wimbledon	A	A	A	Q1	A	A	NH	2R	Q2	2R	1R	A	1R	0 / 4	2–4	33%
US Open	A	A	1R	A	A	A	A	1R	1R	1R	1R	A	2R	0 / 6	1–6	14%
Win–loss	0–0	0–0	0–1	0–0	0–0	0–0	5–1	2–4	0–1	3–4	1–4	0–1	1–2	0 / 18	12–18	40%
National representation
Summer Olympics	NH		A	NH				3R	NH		1R	NH		0 / 2	2–2	50%
Billie Jean King Cup (Note: Formerly known as Fed Cup until 2020.)	WG2	WG2	PO	Z1	A	A	PO (Note: Edition is split into the two years due to COVID-19.)		PO	PO				0 / 0	11–6	65%
WTA 1000 tournaments
Qatar Open	A	NTI	A	NTI	A	NTI	A	NTI	A	NTI	A		A	0 / 0	0–0	–
Dubai Championships	NTI	A	NTI	A	NTI	A	NTI	A	NTI	A	A		A	0 / 0	0–0	–
Indian Wells Open	A	A	A	A	A	A	NH	A	A	A	3R		A	0 / 1	2–1	67%
Miami Open	A	A	A	A	A	A	NH	2R	A	A	2R		A	0 / 2	2–2	50%
Madrid Open	A	A	A	A	A	A	NH	A	A	1R	2R		A	0 / 2	1–2	33%
Italian Open	A	A	A	A	A	A	A	3R	A	1R	1R		A	0 / 3	2–3	40%
Canadian Open	A	A	A	A	A	A	NH	2R	A	A	1R		A	0 / 2	1–2	33%
Cincinnati Open	A	A	A	A	A	A	A	1R	A	A	A		Q2	0 / 1	0–1	0%
China Open	A	A	A	A	A	A	NH			A	A			0 / 0	0–0	–
Wuhan Open	A	A	A	A	A	A	NH				A			0 / 0	0–0	–
Win–loss	0–0	0–0	0–0	0–0	0–0	0–0	0–0	4–4	0–0	0–2	4–5			0 / 11	8–11	42%
Career statistics
	2014	2015	2016	2017	2018	2019	2020	2021	2022	2023	2024	2025	2026	SR	W–L	Win%
Tournaments	0	0	3	4	1	0	4	17	4	18	25	1	5	Career total: 82		
Titles	0	0	0	0	0	0	0	0	0	0			0	Career total: 0		
Finals	0	0	0	0	0	0	0	0	0	0			1	Career total: 1		
Hard win–loss	0–0	0–0	0–3	5–1	0–0	0–0	2–2	10–12	3–3	6–11		0–1	5–2	0 / 32	31–35	47%
Clay win–loss	0–0	0–0	4–1	1–3	1–1	0–0	8–2	4–5	1–2	5–6			0–2	0 / 19	24–22	52%
Grass win–loss	0–0	0–0	0–0	0–0	0–0	0–0	0–0	3–2	0–0	2–3			0–1	0 / 6	5–6	45%
Overall win–loss	0–0	0–0	4–4	6–4	1–1	0–0	10–4	17–19	4–5	13–20	10–25	0–1	5–5	0 / 82	70–88	44%
Win %	–	–	50%	60%	50%	–	71%	47%	44%	39%	29%	0%	50%	Career total: 44%		
Year-end ranking (Note: 2012: WTA ranking-658, 2013: WTA ranking-732.)	371	336	191	314	320	255	47	83	204	78	80	780		$3,319,219		

=== Doubles ===
Current through the 2023 WTA Tour.

Tournament	2014	2015	2016	2017	2018	2019	2020	2021	2022	2023	2024	SR	W–L	Win%
Grand Slam tournaments
Australian Open	A	A	A	A	A	A	A	1R	A	1R		0 / 2	0–2	0%
French Open	A	A	A	A	A	A	A	SF	A	A		0 / 1	4–1	80%
Wimbledon	A	A	A	A	A	A	NH	1R	A	1R		0 / 2	0–2	0%
US Open	A	A	A	A	A	A	A	1R	2R	1R		0 / 3	1–3	25%
Win–loss	0–0	0–0	0–0	0–0	0–0	0–0	0–0	4–4	1–1	0–3		0 / 8	5–8	38%
National representation
Summer Olympics											2R		1–1	50%
Billie Jean King Cup	WG2	WG2	PO	Z1	A	A	PO		PO	A			1–5	17%
WTA 1000 tournaments
Qatar Open	A	NTI	A	NTI	A	NTI	A	NTI	A	NTI		0 / 0	0–0	–
Dubai Championships	NTI	A	NTI	A	NTI	A	NTI	A	NTI	A		0 / 0	0–0	–
Indian Wells Open	A	A	A	A	A	A	NH	A	A	A		0 / 0	0–0	–
Miami Open	A	A	A	A	A	A	NH	QF	A	A		0 / 1	2–1	67%
Madrid Open	A	A	A	A	A	A	NH	A	A	A		0 / 0	0–0	–
Italian Open	A	A	A	A	A	A	A	1R	A	A		0 / 1	0–1	0%
Canadian Open	A	A	A	A	A	A	NH	A	A	A		0 / 0	0–0	–
Cincinnati Open	A	A	A	A	A	A	A	A	A	A		0 / 0	0–0	–
China Open	A	A	A	A	A	A	NH			A		0 / 0	0–0	–
Wuhan Open	A	A	A	A	A	A	NH					0 / 0	0–0	–
Win–loss	0–0	0–0	0–0	0–0	0–0	0–0	0–0	2–2	0–0	0–0		0 / 2	2–2	50%
Career statistics
	2014	2015	2016	2017	2018	2019	2020	2021	2022	2023		SR	W–L	Win%
Tournaments	0 (Note: During the season, she did not play in the main draw of any tour-level tournaments. However, she played at the Billie Jean King Cup, which is not counted as a played tournament but matches counted.)	0	2	3	3	0	1	11	2	4		Career total: 26		
Titles	0	0	0	1	0	0	0	0	0	0		Career total: 1		
Finals	0	0	0	1	1	0	0	0	0	0		Career total: 2		
Overall win-loss	0–1	0–1	0–2	7–3	3–3	0–0	2–1	12–11	1–2	0–6		1 / 25	25–30	45%
Year-end ranking	637	584	312	117	202	488	287	68	461	253				

== WTA Tour finals ==
=== Singles: 1 (runner-up) ===
Legend WTA 250 (0–1)	Finals by surface Hard (0–1)	Finals by setting Outdoor (0–1)

Result	W–L	Date	Tournament	Tier	Surface	Opponent	Score
Loss	0–1	Sep 2026	SP Open, Brazil	WTA 250	Hard	(Spain) Kaitlin Quevedo	6–4, 4–6, 2–6

=== Doubles: 2 (1 title, 1 runner-up) ===
Legend International (1–1)	Finals by surface Clay (1–1)	Finals by setting Outdoor (1–1)

Result	W–L	Date	Tournament	Tier	Surface	Partner	Opponents	Score
Win	1–0	Apr 2017	Copa Colsanitas, Colombia	International	Clay	(Brazil) Beatriz Haddad Maia	(Paraguay) Verónica Cepede Royg (Poland) Magda Linette	6–3, 7–6^{(7–4)}
Loss	1–1	Apr 2018	Copa Colsanitas, Colombia	International	Clay	(Colombia) Mariana Duque Mariño	(Slovenia) Dalila Jakupović (Russia) Irina Khromacheva	3–6, 4–6

== WTA 125 finals ==
=== Singles: 3 (3 titles) ===
Result	W–L	Date	Tournament	Surface	Opponent	Score
Win	1–0	Feb 2023	Copa Bionaire, Colombia	Clay	(Argentina) Paula Ormaechea	6–4, 6–2
Win	2–0	Mar 2024	San Luis Open, Mexico	Clay	(United Kingdom) Francesca Jones	6–1, 6–2
Win	3–0	Aug 2024	Barranquilla Open, Colombia	Hard	(Germany) Tatjana Maria	6–2, 1–6, 6–3

=== Doubles: 2 (runner-ups) ===
Result	W–L	Date	Tournament	Surface	Partner	Opponents	Score
Loss	0–1	Sep 2020	Sparta Prague Open, Czech Republic	Clay	(Italy) Giulia Gatto-Monticone	(Belarus) Lidziya Marozava (Romania) Andreea Mitu	4–6, 4–6
Loss	0–2	Oct 2026	Querétaro Open, Mexico	Clay	(Mexico) Marian Gómez Pezuela Cano	(Ukraine) Valeriya Strakhova (Belgium) Sofia Costoulas	1–6, 1–6

== ITF Circuit finals ==
=== Singles: 19 (16 titles, 3 runner-ups) ===
Legend $60,000 tournaments (1–1) $25,000 tournaments (7–0) $10/15,000 tournaments (8–2)	Finals by surface Hard (3–0) Clay (13–3)

Result	W–L	Date	Tournament	Tier	Surface	Opponent	Score
Win	1–0	Nov 2013	ITF Santiago, Chile	10,000	Clay	(Chile) Cecilia Costa Melgar	6–2, 5–7, 3–5 ret.
Win	2–0	Mar 2014	ITF Lima, Peru	10,000	Clay	(Argentina) Carla Lucero	6–3, 6–4
Win	3–0	Mar 2014	ITF Lima, Peru	10,000	Clay	(Hungary) Csilla Argyelán	6–2, 6–4
Win	4–0	May 2014	ITF Bol, Croatia	10,000	Clay	(Peru) Bianca Botto	6–1, 6–7^{(6)}, 6–1
Win	5–0	Jun 2014	ITF Bol, Croatia	10,000	Clay	(Ukraine) Olga Ianchuk	6–3, 2–6, 6–2
Win	6–0	Mar 2015	ITF São José dos Campos, Brazil	10,000	Clay	(Argentina) Victoria Bosio	6–7^{(6)}, 7–6^{(2)}, 6–3
Loss	6–1	Mar 2015	ITF São José do Rio Preto, Brazil	10,000	Clay	(Poland) Katarzyna Kawa	5–7, 6–3, 4–6
Loss	6–2	Apr 2015	ITF Santiago, Chile	15,000	Clay	(Chile) Fernanda Brito	1–6, 0–6
Win	7–2	Apr 2016	ITF São José dos Campos, Brazil	10,000	Clay	(Brazil) Gabriela Cé	7–6^{(2)}, 6–1
Win	8–2	Jul 2016	ITF Denain, France	25,000	Clay	(France) Irina Ramialison	6–3, 5–7, 6–4
Win	9–2	Jun 2018	ITF Périgueux, France	25,000	Clay	(France) Myrtille Georges	6–2, 6–0
Win	10–2	May 2019	ITF Monzón, Spain	W25	Hard	(Spain) Cristina Bucșa	6–2, 4–6, 6–2
Win	11–2	Oct 2019	ITF Pula, Italy	W25	Clay	(Italy) Martina Trevisan	7–6^{(5)}, 6–1
Win	12–2	Jan 2020	ITF Malibu, United States	W25	Hard	(United States) Claire Liu	4–6, 6–3, 6–3
Win	13–2	Jan 2020	ITF Petit-Bourg, Guadeloupe	W25	Hard	(France) Harmony Tan	7–5, 7–5
Win	14–2	Sep 2020	Open de Saint-Malo, France	W60+H	Clay	(Spain) Cristina Bucșa	4–6, 7–5, 6–2
Loss	14–3	Aug 2022	ITF Tour Gran Canaria, Spain	W60	Clay	(Austria) Julia Grabher	4–6, 3–6
Win	15–3	Apr 2026	ITF Madrid, Spain	W15	Clay	(Spain) María García Cid	4–1 ret.
Win	16–3	Jun 2026	ITF San Gregorio, Italy	W35	Clay	(Peru) Lucciana Pérez Alarcón	4–6, 6–4, 7–6^{(5)}

=== Doubles: 12 (7 titles, 5 runner-ups) ===
Legend $60,000 tournaments (2–1) $25,000 tournaments (3–1) $10/15,000 tournaments (2–3)	Finals by surface Hard (2–0) Clay (5–5)

Result	W–L	Date	Tournament	Tier	Surface	Partner	Opponents	Score
Win	1–0	Dec 2013	ITF São José dos Campos, Brazil	10k	Clay	(Brazil) Eduarda Piai	(Chile) Fernanda Brito (Argentina) Stephanie Petit	7–6^{(4)}, 7–5
Loss	1–1	Mar 2014	ITF Santiago, Chile	10k	Clay	(Argentina) Sofía Blanco	(Chile) Fernanda Brito (Chile) Camila Silva	6–1, 6–7^{(5)}, [7–10]
Loss	1–2	Mar 2015	ITF São José do Rio Preto, Brazil	10k	Clay	(Argentina) Guadalupe Pérez Rojas	(Argentina) Ana Victoria Gobbi Monllau (Argentina) Constanza Vega	3–6, 6–3, [9–11]
Win	2–2	Apr 2015	ITF Santiago, Chile	15k	Clay	(Argentina) Guadalupe Pérez Rojas	(Chile) Fernanda Brito (Brazil) Eduarda Piai	6–4, 6–4
Loss	2–3	Mar 2016	ITF Campinas, Brazil	25k	Clay	(Argentina) Guadalupe Pérez Rojas	(Brazil) Gabriela Cé (Argentina) Florencia Molinero	6–1, 4–6, [4–10]
Loss	2–4	Apr 2016	ITF São José dos Campos, Brazil	10k	Clay	(Argentina) Guadalupe Pérez Rojas	(Paraguay) Camila Giangreco Campiz (Argentina) Constanza Vega	7–6^{(5)}, 6–7^{(5)}, [8–10]
Win	3–4	Jun 2016	Hódmezővásárhely Ladies Open, Hungary	25k	Clay	(Brazil) Laura Pigossi	(Romania) Irina Bara (North Macedonia) Lina Gjorcheska	6–3, 6–0
Win	4–4	Feb 2017	ITF Surprise, United States	25k	Hard	(Colombia) Mariana Duque Mariño	(United States) Usue Maitane Arconada (United States) Sofia Kenin	4–6, 6–0, [10–5]
Win	5–4	Jul 2017	Internazionale ATV Roma, Italy	60k	Clay	(Russia) Anastasiya Komardina	(Netherlands) Quirine Lemoine (Netherlands) Eva Wacanno	7–6^{(3)}, 6–3
Win	6–4	Jun 2018	Hódmezővásárhely Ladies Open (2)	60k	Clay	(Hungary) Réka Luca Jani	(Montenegro) Danka Kovinić (Serbia) Nina Stojanović	6–4, 6–4
Win	7–4	Sep 2018	ITF Lubbock, United States	25k	Hard	(United Kingdom) Naomi Broady	(Montenegro) Vladica Babić (United States) Hayley Carter	3–6, 6–2, [10–8]
Loss	7–5	Apr 2023	Chiasso Open, Switzerland	W60	Clay	(Romania) Andreea Mitu	(United Kingdom) Emily Appleton (Germany) Julia Lohoff	1–6, 2–6

== Grand Slam results details ==
=== Singles ===
	Australian Open			
2021 Australian Open
Round	Opponent	Rank	Score	NPR
1R	(United States) Christina McHale	No. 84	6–4, 6–4	No. 45
2R	(Croatia) Donna Vekić (28)	No. 33	2–6, 2–6	No. 45
2023 Australian Open (Protected ranking)
Round	Opponent	Rank	Score	NPR
1R	(France) Léolia Jeanjean (LL)	No. 109	6–0, 6–3	No. 191
2R	Victoria Azarenka (24)	No. 24	1–6, 0–6	No. 191
2024 Australian Open
Round	Opponent	Rank	Score	NPR
1R	(Slovenia) Tamara Zidanšek	No. 98	6–1, 6–0	No. 65
2R	(United States) Amanda Anisimova (PR)	No. 442	2–6, 3–6	No. 65

	French Open			
2020 French Open (Qualifier)
Round	Opponent	Rank	Score	NPR
Q1	(Poland) Magdalena Fręch	No. 158	6–2, 6–2	No. 131
Q2	(Romania) Jaqueline Cristian	No. 167	6–0, 6–4	No. 131
Q3	(China) Wang Xinyu (20)	No. 146	6–2, 6–4	No. 131
1R	(Belgium) Greet Minnen	No. 110	6–2, 6–1	No. 131
2R	(Kazakhstan) Yulia Putintseva (23)	No. 27	6–3, 1–6, 6–2	No. 131
3R	(Slovakia) Anna Karolína Schmiedlová (PR)	No. 161	6–3, 6–2	No. 131
4R	(Czech Republic) Barbora Krejčíková	No. 114	2–6, 6–2, 6–3	No. 131
QF	(Ukraine) Elina Svitolina (3)	No. 5	6–2, 6–4	No. 131
SF	(Poland) Iga Świątek	No. 54	2–6, 1–6	No. 131

	Wimbledon Championships			
2021 Wimbledon
Round	Opponent	Rank	Score	NPR
1R	(United States) Ann Li	No. 72	6–4, 7–6^{(7–1)}	No. 39
2R	(Czech Republic) Tereza Martincová	No. 87	3–6, 6–7^{(5)}	No. 39
2023 Wimbledon
Round	Opponent	Rank	Score	NPR
1R	(Czech Republic) Tereza Martincová	No. 115	3–6, 7–6^{(7–5)}, 6–4	No. 80
2R	Victoria Azarenka (19)	No. 20	3–6, 0–6	No. 80

	US Open			
2016 US Open (Qualifier)
Round	Opponent	Rank	Score	NPR
Q1	(France) Océane Dodin (20)	No. 127	6–3, 6–3	No. 232
Q2	(Serbia) Jovana Jakšić	No. 182	2–6, 7–6^{(10–8)}, 7–5	No. 232
Q3	(Croatia) Donna Vekić (4)	No. 106	6–4, 6–3	No. 232
1R	(Germany) Annika Beck	No. 41	6–7^{(6–8)}, 3–6	No. 230
2021 US Open
Round	Opponent	Rank	Score	NPR
1R	(Belgium) Greet Minnen (LL)	No. 104	4–6, 6–1, 3–6	No. 37
2022 US Open (Protected ranking)
Round	Opponent	Rank	Score	NPR
1R	(Slovakia) Anna Karolína Schmiedlová	No. 115	3–6, 2–6	No. 212
2023 US Open
Round	Opponent	Rank	Score	NPR
1R	(China) Zheng Qinwen (23)	No. 23	1–6, 0–6	No. 70
2024 US Open
Round	Opponent	Rank	Score	NPR
1R	Diana Shnaider (18)	No. 18	0–6, 1–6	No. 68

== Wins over Top 10 players ==
- Podoroska has a 3–2 (60%) record against players who were, at the time the match was played, ranked in the top 10.

#	Player	Rank	Event	Surface	Rd	Score	Rk
2020
1.	(Ukraine) Elina Svitolina	5	French Open, France	Clay	QF	6–2, 6–4	131
2021
2.	(Czech Republic) Petra Kvitová	9	Yarra Valley Classic, Australia	Hard	3R	5–7, 6–1, 7–6^{(9–7)}	47
3.	(United States) Serena Williams	8	Italian Open, Italy	Clay	2R	7–6^{(8–6)}, 7–5	44
