= SP Open =

- 2026 SP Open

WTA Tour
- Founded: 2025
- Editions: 2
- Location: São Paulo; Brazil
- Venue: Parque Villa-Lobos
- Category: WTA 250
- Surface: Hard
- Draw: 32S / 16Q / 16D
- Prize money: $283,347 (2026)

Current champions (2026)
- Singles: (Spain) Kaitlin Quevedo
- Doubles: (Canada) Gabriela Dabrowski (Brazil) Luisa Stefani

The SP Open is a professional WTA 250 women's tennis tournament on the WTA Tour, played on outdoor hardcourts at Parque Villa-Lobos in São Paulo, Brazil since 2025. The event marked the return of the WTA Tour to São Paulo for the first time since 2000, when the WTA Brasil Open was played there. It replaced the Monastir Open on the WTA calendar.

== Past finals ==
=== Singles ===
| Year | Champion | Runner-up | Score |
|---|---|---|---|
| 2025 | (France) Tiantsoa Rakotomanga Rajaonah | (Indonesia) Janice Tjen | 6–3, 6–4 |
| 2026 | (Spain) Kaitlin Quevedo | (Argentina) Nadia Podoroska | 4–6, 6–4, 6–2 |

=== Doubles ===
| Year | Champions | Runners-up | Score |
|---|---|---|---|
| 2025 | (Hungary) Tímea Babos (Brazil) Luisa Stefani | (Brazil) Ingrid Martins (Brazil) Laura Pigossi | 4–6, 6–3, [10–4] |
| 2026 | (Canada) Gabriela Dabrowski (Brazil) Luisa Stefani (2) | (United States) Anna Rogers (United States) Allura Zamarripa | 6–3, 3–6, [10–7] |

== See also ==
- WTA Brasil Open – women's tournament held in various locations in Brazil, including São Paulo (1977–2002)
- Brasil Tennis Cup – women's tournament held in Florianópolis (2013–2016)
- Brasil Open – men's tournament held in Costa do Sauípe (2001–2011) and São Paulo (2012–2019)
