= Kaitlin Quevedo =

Spanish tennis player (born 2006)

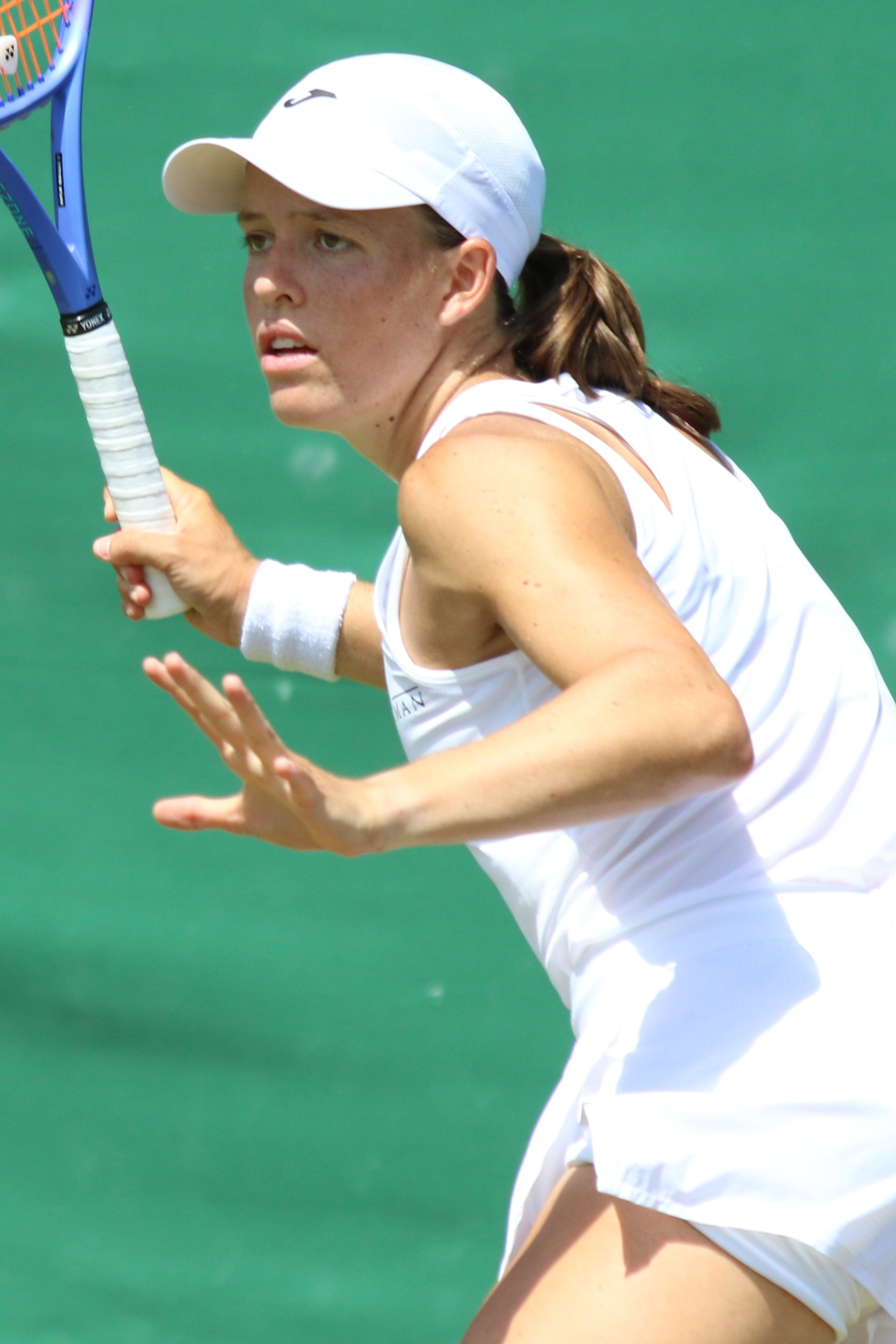
- Quevedo at the 2026 Wimbledon Championships
- Country (sports): Spain (2024–)
- Residence: Barcelona, Spain
- Born: 13 February 2006 (age 20) Naples, Florida, United States
- Height: 1.67 m (5 ft 6 in)
- Turned pro: 2022
- Plays: Right (two-handed backhand)
- Coach: Guillem Burniol
- Prize money: $615,508

Singles
- Career record: 164–77
- Career titles: 1
- Highest ranking: No. 71 (2 November 2026)
- Current ranking: No. 71 (2 November 2026)

Grand Slam singles results
- Australian Open: Q1 (2026)
- French Open: 2R (2026)
- Wimbledon: Q2 (2026)
- US Open: 1R (2026)

Doubles
- Career record: 17–14
- Career titles: 1 ITF
- Highest ranking: No. 435 (26 October 2026)
- Current ranking: No. 442 (2 November 2026)

Team competitions
- Fed Cup: 2–0
- Last updated on: 2 November 2026.

Kaitlin Quevedo (born 13 February 2006) is an American-born Spanish professional tennis player. She has a career-high singles ranking by the WTA of No. 71, achieved on 2 November 2026 and a best in doubles of No. 435, achieved on 26 October 2026.

Quevedo has won one WTA Tour singles title at the 2026 SP Open.

== Early life and background ==
Quevedo was raised in Naples, Florida. Her father is from Gran Canaria. She attended high school at the Community School of Naples and trained at the Gomez Tennis Academy. She began to compete under the Spanish flag in 2024, training in Barcelona.

== Career ==
=== 2021–23: Girls’ 16 USTA clay champion, top 5 ===
In 2021, Quevedo won the United States Tennis Association (USTA) Girls’ 16 National Clay Court Championships singles title.

In June 2023, she reached the top five of the junior world rankings. In 2023, she won the Trofeo Bonfiglio in Milan, and competed in the ITF Junior Masters at the end of the year in Chengdu.

=== 2024–25: Nationality change, W100 title ===
In January, Quevedo competed in the Burnie International in Tasmania. In March 2024, she won her first title under the Spanish flag in Manacor, with a win in the final against Natália Szabanin of Hungary.

In April 2025, she reached the final of the W100 Zaragoza Open defeating higher ranked Olivia Gadecki, in straight sets. In the final, she lost to Anastasia Zakharova. That month, she reached the final round of qualifying at the Madrid Open by defeating compatriot Nuria Párrizas, before losing to Anna Blinkova.

On 3 August 2025, she played the final of the ITF World Tennis Tour Gran Canaria against Arantxa Rus of the Netherlands, winning in three sets.

=== 2026: Major, WTA Tour & top 100 debuts, first career title ===
Quevedo made her WTA Tour main-draw debut as a qualifier at the 2026 Auckland Open and defeated eighth seed Peyton Stearns, before losing to fellow qualifier Sofia Costoulas in the second round. She was given a wildcard entry into the Madrid Open and defeated Venus Williams in straight sets, before losing to Hailey Baptiste in her next match. In May, she qualified for the French Open for her major main-draw debut, and defeated wildcard Léolia Jeanjean recording her first match win at a major. However, Quevedo lost to seventh seed Elina Svitolina, in the second round. She made her top 100 debut on 13 July 2026.

Quevedo reached her first WTA Tour final at the 2026 SP Open defeating home favorite Naná Silva, Teodora Kostović and Anna Blinkova. Quevedo won her first career title defeating Nadia Podoroska, and rose to a new career-high ranking of world No. 73 on 21 September 2026.

== Performance timeline ==
Key
W	F	SF	QF	#R	RR	Q#	P#	DNQ	A	Z#	PO	G	S	B	NMS	NTI	P	NH

(W) winner; (F) finalist; (SF) semifinalist; (QF) quarterfinalist; (#R) rounds 4, 3, 2, 1; (RR) round-robin stage; (Q#) qualification round; (P#) preliminary round; (DNQ) did not qualify; (A) absent; (Z#) Davis/Fed Cup Zonal Group (with number indication) or (PO) play-off; (G) gold, (S) silver or (B) bronze Olympic/Paralympic medal; (NMS) not a Masters tournament; (NTI) not a Tier I tournament; (P) postponed; (NH) not held; (SR) strike rate (events won / competed); (W–L) win–loss record.
To avoid confusion and double counting, these charts are updated at the conclusion of a tournament or when the player's participation has ended.

Only main-draw results in WTA Tour, Grand Slam tournaments, Billie Jean King Cup, United Cup, Hopman Cup and Olympic Games are included in win–loss records.

=== Singles ===
Current through the 2026 Japan Women's Open.

Tournament	2025	2026	SR	W–L	Win %
Grand Slam tournaments
Australian Open	A	Q1	0 / 0	0–0	–
French Open	A	2R	0 / 1	1–1	50%
Wimbledon	A	Q2	0 / 0	0–0	–
US Open	A	1R	0 / 1	0–1	0%
Win–Loss	0–0	1–2	0 / 2	1–2	33%
National representation
Billie Jean King Cup	A	SF	0 / 1	2–0	50%
WTA 1000 tournaments
Madrid Open	Q2	2R	0 / 1	1–1	50%
Win–Loss	0–0	1–1	0 / 1	1–1	50%
Career statistics
Tournaments	0	9	Career total: 9		
Titles	0	1	Career total: 1		
Finals	0	1	Career total: 1		
Overall win–loss	0–0	11–8			

== WTA Tour finals ==
=== Singles: 1 (title) ===
Legend WTA 250 (1–0)	Finals by surface Hard (1–0)	Finals by setting Outdoor (1–0)

Result	W–L	Date	Tournament	Tier	Surface	Opponent	Score
Win	1–0	Sep 2026	SP Open, Brazil	WTA 250	Hard	(Argentina) Nadia Podoroska	4–6, 6–4, 6–2

== WTA 125 finals ==
=== Singles: 1 (runner-up) ===
Result	Date	Tournament	Surface	Opponent	Score
Loss	Aug 2026	Târgu Mureș Open, Romania	Clay	(Czech Republic) Laura Samson	6–2, 3–6, 1–6

== ITF Circuit finals ==
=== Singles: 14 (10 titles, 4 runner-ups) ===
Legend W100 tournaments (1–1) W75 tournaments (1–1) W50 tournaments (0–2) W35 tournaments (2–0) W15 tournaments (6–0)	Finals by surface Hard (4–2) Clay (6–2)

Result	W–L	Date	Tournament	Tier	Surface	Opponent	Score
Win	1–0	Sep 2022	ITF Cancun, Mexico	W15	Hard	(Brazil) Thaisa Grana Pedretti	6–3, 6–4
Win	2–0	Sep 2022	ITF Cancún, Mexico	W15	Hard	(Israel) Mika Dagan Fruchtman	6–2, 6–3
Win	3–0	Oct 2022	ITF Bucaramanga, Colombia	W15	Clay	(United States) Sofia Sewing	6–3, 6–7^{(6)}, 7–5
Win	4–0	Mar 2024	ITF Manacor, Spain	W15	Hard	(Hungary) Natalia Szabanin	6–2, 3–1 ret.
Win	5–0	Mar 2024	ITF Sabadell, Spain	W15	Clay	(Sweden) Caijsa Hennemann	6–0, 6–4
Win	6–0	Jun 2024	ITF Madrid, Spain	W15	Hard	(Spain) Noelia Bouzo Zanotti	6–3, 2–0 ret.
Win	7–0	Jul 2024	ITF Buzau, Romania	W35	Clay	(Romania) Patricia Maria Tig	3–6, 7–6^{(7)}, 7–6^{(6)}
Loss	7–1	Sep 2024	ITF Saint-Palais-sur-Mer, France	W50	Clay	(Lithuania) Justina Mikulskytė	5–7, 6–7^{(2)}
Loss	7–2	Apr 2025	Zaragoza Open, Spain	W100	Clay	Anastasia Zakharova	3–6, 1–6
Win	8–2	Jun 2025	ITF Klagenfurt, Austria	W35	Clay	(Serbia) Mia Ristić	6–4, 6–4
Win	9–2	Aug 2025	ITF Gran Canaria, Spain	W100	Clay	(Netherlands) Arantxa Rus	4–6, 6–2, 6–4
Loss	9–3	Sep 2025	ITF Évora, Portugal	W50	Hard	Alina Korneeva	3–6, 1–6
Loss	9–4	Oct 2025	Hamburg Ladies Cup, Germany	W75	Hard (i)	Erika Andreeva	4–6, 2–6
Win	10–4	May 2026	Open Saint-Gaudens, France	W75	Clay	(Spain) Andrea Lázaro García	6–3, 6–2

=== Doubles: 3 (1 title, 2 runner-ups) ===
Legend W35 tournaments (1–0) W15 tournaments (0–2)	Finals by surface Hard (0–2) Clay (1–0)

Result	W–L	Date	Tournament	Tier	Surface	Partner	Opponents	Score
Loss	0–1	Oct 2022	ITF Cancún, Mexico	W15	Hard	(Mexico) Jessica Hinojosa Gómez	(Canada) Louise Kwong (United States) Anna Ulyashchenko	4–6, 4–6
Loss	0–2	Mar 2024	ITF Manacor, Spain	W15	Hard	(Montenegro) Tea Nikčević	(Germany) Alicia Melosch (United States) Julia Ronney	3–6, 4–6
Win	1–2	May 2024	ITF Hammamet, Tunisia	W35	Clay	(Japan) Ikumi Yamazaki	(Colombia) María Herazo González (France) Yasmine Mansouri	6–3, 7–6^{(5)}
