= Lian Tran =

Dutch tennis player (born 2002)

- with Kaat Coppez, 2026
- Country (sports): Netherlands
- Born: 19 July 2002 (age 24) Rotterdam, Netherlands
- Plays: Right-handed
- Prize money: $100,983

Singles
- Career record: 175–158
- Career titles: 1 ITF
- Highest ranking: No. 329 (14 July 2025)
- Current ranking: No. 715 (8 June 2026)

Doubles
- Career record: 140–126
- Career titles: 1 WTA Challenger, 6 ITF
- Highest ranking: No. 174 (13 October 2025)
- Current ranking: No. 232 (8 June 2026)
- Last updated on: 9 June 2026.

Lian Tran (born 19 July 2002) is a Dutch tennis player.

Tran has a career-high singles ranking by the WTA of 329, achieved on 14 July 2025, and a best doubles ranking of world No. 174, achieved on 13 October 2025.

Tran has a career-high ITF juniors ranking of No. 303, achieved on 31 December 2018.

Her family is originally from Vietnam. Her older sister Demi Tran is also a tennis player. They moved to the Netherlands with their family at a young age. She started playing tennis at the age of four with the guidance of her family.

== Career ==
Tran won her first W75 title at the 2024 Kyotec Open in the doubles draw, partnering with Alevtina Ibragimova. In the singles draw, she came from the qualifiers and advanced to the semifinals where she was defeated by Swiss Céline Naef, in two sets.

In 2025, Tran reached the last round of qualification for a WTA 250 at the SP Open, losing there to Miriana Tona.

== WTA 125 finals ==
=== Doubles: 1 (title) ===
Result	W–L	Date	Tournament	Surface	Partner	Opponents	Score
Win	1–0	Nov 2025	Tucumán Open, Mexico	Clay	(Russia) Anastasia Zolotareva	(Spain) Alicia Herrero Liñana (Ukraine) Valeriya Strakhova	2–6, 6–1, [10–6]

== ITF Circuit finals ==
=== Singles: 3 (2 titles, 1 runner-up) ===
Legend W35 tournaments (0–1) W15 tournaments (2–0)	Finals by surface Hard (2–0) Clay (0–1)

Result	W–L	Date	Tournament	Tier	Surface	Opponent	Score
Win	1–0	Nov 2023	ITF Alcalá de Henares, Spain	W15	Hard	(Spain) Cristina Díaz Adrover	7–5, 6–0
Loss	1–1	Dec 2024	ITF Nairobi, Kenya	W35	Clay	(Chinese Taipei) Joanna Garland	1–6, 1–6
Win	2–1	Oct 2026	ITF Essen, Germany	W15	Hard (i)	(Germany) Josy Daems	6–2, 6–3

=== Doubles: 19 (6 titles, 13 runner-ups) ===
Legend W75 tournaments (1–2) W50 tournaments (0–4) W35 tournaments (1–3) W15 tournaments (4–4)	Finals by surface Hard (4–5) Clay (1–7) Carpet (1–1)

Result	W–L	Date	Location	Tier	Surface	Partner	Opponents	Score
Win	1–0	Jan 2020	ITF Cancún, Mexico	W15	Hard	(Lithuania) Justina Mikulskytė	(Mexico) Victoria Rodríguez (United States) Sofia Sewing	6–2, 4–6, [10–7]
Win	2–0	Sep 2021	ITF Cairo, Egypt	W15	Clay	(Netherlands) Jasmijn Gimbrère	(Thailand) Punnin Kovapitukted (Netherlands) Demi Tran	6–3, 3–6, [10–5]
Loss	2–1	Nov 2021	ITF Heraklion, Greece	W15	Clay	(Germany) Julia Kimmelmann	(Israel) Nicole Khirin (Slovakia) Radka Zelníčková	2–6, 4–6
Loss	2–2	Aug 2022	ITF Eindhoven, Netherlands	W15	Clay	(Netherlands) Demi Tran	(Lithuania) Patricija Paukštytė (France) Laïa Petretic	6–4, 5–7, [9–11]
Win	3–2	Oct 2022	ITF Solarino, Italy	W15	Carpet (i)	(Switzerland) Leonie Küng	(Italy) Giulia Crescenzi (Italy) Miriana Tona	6–2, 6–2
Loss	3–3	Nov 2022	ITF Solarino, Italy	W15	Carpet (i)	(Uzbekistan) Sevil Yuldasheva	(Italy) Virginia Ferrara (Italy) Giorgia Pedone	3–6, 2–6
Loss	3–4	Apr 2023	ITF Monastir, Tunisia	W15	Hard	(Netherlands) Demi Tran	(Australia) Lily Fairclough (Australia) Lisa Mays	7–5, 2–6, [4–10]
Win	4–4	Nov 2023	ITF Alcalá de Henares, Spain	W15	Hard	(Belgium) Tilwith Di Girolami	(Italy) Ester Ivaldo (Norway) Carina Syrtveit	6–4, 6–2
Loss	4–5	Aug 2024	ITF Duffel, Belgium	W35	Clay	(Belgium) Tilwith Di Girolami	(Belgium) Magali Kempen (Belgium) Ema Kovacevic	1–6, 4–6
Loss	4–6	Aug 2024	ITF Arequipa, Peru	W50	Clay	(France) Tiantsoa Rakotomanga Rajaonah	(Argentina) Jazmín Ortenzi (Peru) Lucciana Pérez Alarcón	7–5, 3–6, [1–10]
Win	5–6	Oct 2024	ITF Loulé, Portugal	W35	Hard	(Japan) Michika Ozeki	(Slovakia) Salma Drugdová (Luxembourg) Marie Weckerle	6–4, 6–2
Loss	5–7	Oct 2024	ITF Hamburg, Germany	W75	Hard (i)	(India) Riya Bhatia	(United Kingdom) Madeleine Brooks (Netherlands) Isabelle Haverlag	3–6, 2–6
Win	6–7	Nov 2024	Pétange Open, Luxembourg	W75	Hard (i)	Alevtina Ibragimova	(Czech Republic) Jesika Malečková (Czech Republic) Miriam Škoch	1–6, 6–2, [11–9]
Loss	6–8	Jan 2025	ITF Nairobi, Kenya	W35	Clay	(Netherlands) Demi Tran	(Burundi) Sada Nahimana (Kenya) Angella Okutoyi	3–6, 3–6
Loss	6–9	Jan 2025	Open Andrézieux-Bouthéon, France	W75	Hard (i)	(Switzerland) Conny Perrin	(Turkey) Ayla Aksu; Yuliya Hatouka	7–5, 4–6, [12–14]
Loss	6–10	Mar 2025	ITF Bujumbura, Burundi	W50	Clay	(Netherlands) Demi Tran	(Switzerland) Chelsea Fontenel; Ksenia Zaytseva	6–4, 1–6, [9–11]
Loss	6–11	Feb 2026	Open de l'Isère, France	W50	Hard (i)	(Netherlands) Demi Tran	(France) Tiphanie Lemaître (Ukraine) Veronika Podrez	3–6, 2–6
Loss	6–12	Aug 2026	ITF Oldenzaal, Netherlands	W50	Clay	(Bulgaria) Isabella Shinikova	(Germany) Tayisiya Morderger (Germany) Yana Morderger	3–6, 3–6
Loss	6–13	Sep 2026	ITF Reims, France	W35	Hard (i)	(Belgium) Kaat Coppez	(South Korea) Im Hee-rae (South Korea) Kim Eun-chae	4–6, 4–6
