= Jazmín Ortenzi =

Argentine tennis player

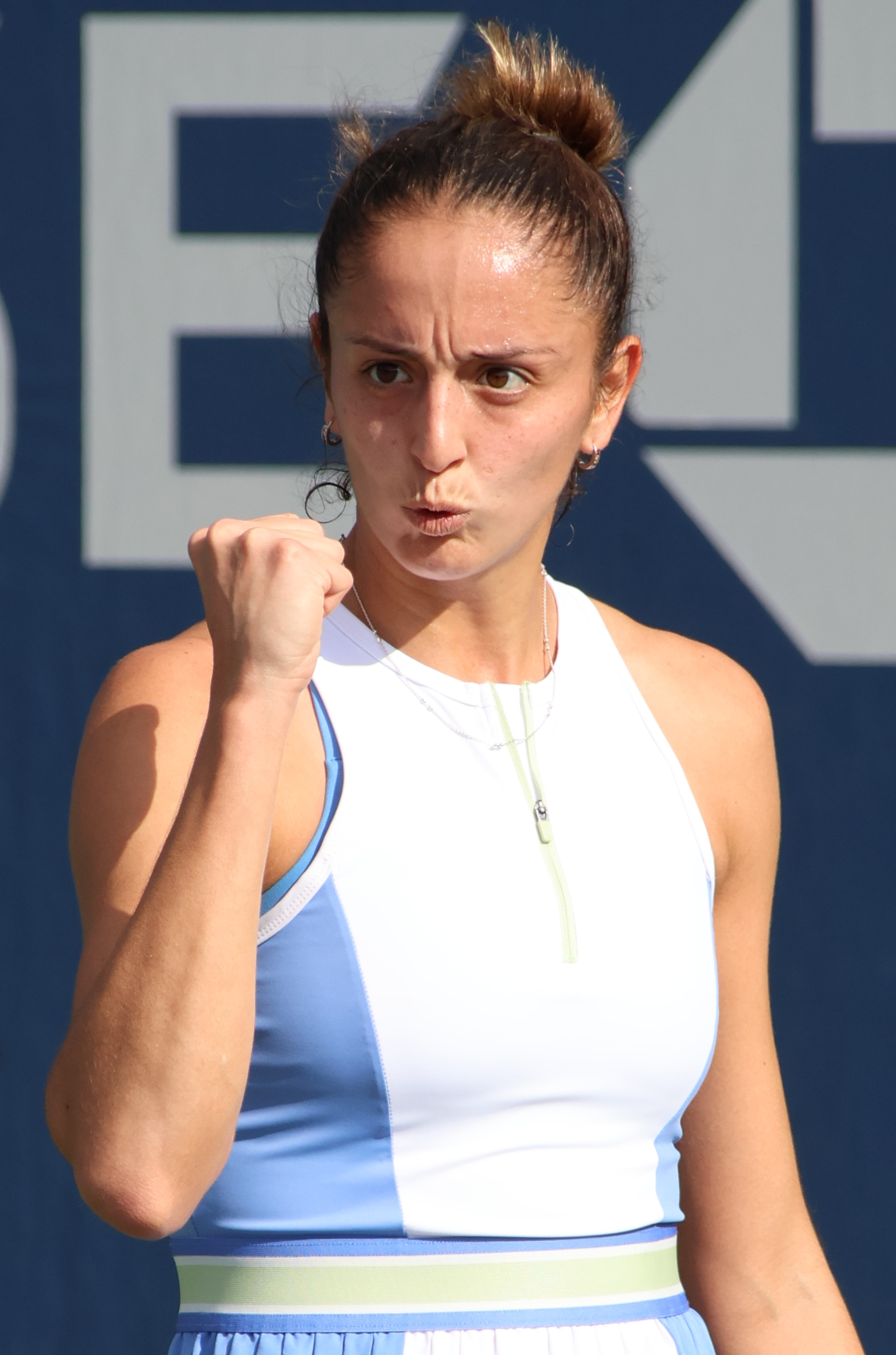
- Ortenzi at the 2026 US Open
- Country (sports): Argentina
- Born: 20 November 2001 (age 24)
- Plays: Right (two-handed backhand)
- Prize money: $228,421

Singles
- Career record: 248–130
- Career titles: 12 ITF
- Highest ranking: No. 151 (21 September 2026)
- Current ranking: No. 151 (21 September 2026)

Grand Slam singles results
- Australian Open: Q2 (2026)
- French Open: Q2 (2026)
- Wimbledon: Q1 (2025, 2026)
- US Open: Q1 (2026)

Doubles
- Career record: 122–65
- Career titles: 13 ITF
- Highest ranking: No. 279 (6 April 2026)
- Current ranking: No. 350 (25 May 2026)

Team competitions
- Fed Cup: 3–3
- Last updated on: 20 September 2026.

Jazmín Ortenzi (born 20 November 2001) is an Argentine tennis player. She has a career-high WTA singles ranking of world No. 151, achieved on 21 September 2026, and a best WTA doubles ranking of No. 279, attained on 6 April 2026. She is currently the No. 3 Argentine singles player.

Ortenzi made her Fed Cup debut for Argentina in 2019.

== Career ==
Ortenzi made her WTA Tour main-draw debut at the 2025 SP Open, losing to Berfu Cengiz in the first round.

Ranked No. 206, at the 2026 Copa Colsanitas, Ortenzi qualified for the main draw and recorded her maiden tour-level win, defeating Irene Burillo in the first round. Next, she overcame third seed and two-time defending champion, Camila Osorio, and wildcard and compatriot Julia Riera to reach her first WTA Tour semifinal, which she lost to top seed Marie Bouzková in straight sets. As a result, she reached the top 175, on 6 April 2026, rising more than 40 positions up in the WTA singles rankings.

Ortenzi also made her third main draw at the 2026 SP Open, this time as a direct entry, and defeated qualifier Chloé Paquet in the first round but lost to second seed Paula Badosa.

== ITF Circuit finals ==
=== Singles: 21 (12 titles, 9 runner-ups) ===
| Legend W50 tournaments (1–1) W35 tournaments (1–6) W15 tournaments (10–2) | Finals by surface Clay (12–9) |

| Result | W–L | Date | Tournament | Tier | Surface | Opponent | Score |
|---|---|---|---|---|---|---|---|
| Loss | 0–1 | Aug 2018 | ITF Lambare, Paraguay | W15 | Clay | (Chile) Fernanda Brito | 3–6, 6–1, 4–6 |
| Win | 1–1 | Aug 2019 | ITF Santa Cruz de la Sierra, Bolivia | W15 | Clay | (Argentina) Victoria Bosio | 6–3, 6–2 |
| Win | 2–1 | Aug 2019 | ITF La Paz, Bolivia | W15 | Clay | (Peru) Romina Ccuno | 6–3, 6–3 |
| Loss | 2–2 | Oct 2019 | ITF Buenos Aires, Argentina | W15 | Clay | (Argentina) Guillermina Naya | 3–6, 5–7 |
| Win | 3–2 | Nov 2021 | ITF Antalya, Turkey | W15 | Clay | (Russia) Diana Demidova | 6–0, 7–5 |
| Win | 4–2 | Nov 2021 | ITF Antalya, Turkey | W15 | Clay | (Russia) Daria Lodikova | 6–0, 6–0 |
| Win | 5–2 | Dec 2021 | ITF Antalya, Turkey | W15 | Clay | (Romania) Arina Vasilescu | 6–2, 7–6^{(7)} |
| Win | 6–2 | May 2023 | ITF Curitiba, Brazil | W15 | Clay | (Brazil) Ana Candiotto | 6–3, 6–3 |
| Win | 7–2 | May 2023 | ITF Recife, Brazil | W15 | Clay | (United States) Sabastiani León | 6–4, 7–5 |
| Win | 8–2 | Mar 2024 | ITF Córdoba, Argentina | W15 | Clay | (Argentina) Julieta Lara Estable | 6–2, 6–0 |
| Loss | 8–3 | Apr 2024 | ITF Mosquera, Colombia | W35 | Clay | (Colombia) Yuliana Lizarazo | 1–6, 1–6 |
| Loss | 8–4 | May 2024 | ITF Sopo, Colombia | W35 | Clay | (France) Alice Tubello | 4–6, 2–6 |
| Win | 9–4 | May 2024 | ITF Rio Claro, Brazil | W15 | Clay | (United States) Amy Zhu | 6–1, 6–2 |
| Win | 10–4 | Jun 2024 | ITF Maringá, Brazil | W15 | Clay | (Peru) Lucciana Pérez | 6–4, 6–3 |
| Loss | 10–5 | Aug 2024 | ITF Arequipa, Peru | W50 | Clay | (France) Tiantsoa Rakotomanga Rajaonah | 4–6, 4–6 |
| Loss | 10–6 | Sep 2024 | ITF Piracicaba, Brazil | W35 | Clay | (Italy) Giorgia Pedone | 4–6, 2–6 |
| Loss | 10–7 | Jan 2025 | ITF Buenos Aires, Argentina | W35 | Clay | (Brazil) Carolina Alves | 2–6, 4–6 |
| Loss | 10–8 | Jan 2025 | ITF Buenos Aires, Argentina | W35 | Clay | (Argentina) Luisina Giovannini | 4–6, 4–6 |
| Win | 11–8 | May 2025 | ITF Båstad, Sweden | W35 | Clay | (Spain) Irene Burillo | 6–4, 6–2 |
| Loss | 11–9 | Sep 2025 | ITF Cuiabá, Brazil | W35 | Clay | (United States) Hibah Shaikh | 6–2, 1–6, 2–6 |
| Win | 12–9 | Oct 2025 | ITF Ibagué, Colombia | W50 | Clay | (Greece) Despina Papamichail | 7–5, 2–6, 6–3 |

=== Doubles: 24 (13 titles, 11 runner-ups) ===
| Legend W75 tournaments (0–1) W50 tournaments (2–1) W35 tournaments (2–4) W15 tournaments (9–5) | Finals by surface Hard (2–1) Clay (11–10) |

| Result | W–L | Date | Tournament | Tier | Surface | Partner | Opponents | Score |
|---|---|---|---|---|---|---|---|---|
| Win | 1–0 | Aug 2019 | ITF Santa Cruz, Bolivia | W15 | Clay | (Bolivia) Noelia Zeballos | (Russia) Elizaveta Koklina (Russia) Anna Morgina | 6–1, 4–6, [11–9] |
| Win | 2–0 | Aug 2019 | ITF La Paz, Bolivia | W15 | Clay | (Bolivia) Noelia Zeballos | (Peru) Romina Ccuno (Colombia) Antonia Samudio | 6–2, 1–6, [10–4] |
| Loss | 2–1 | Nov 2020 | ITF Cairo, Egypt | W15 | Clay | (United States) Anastasia Nefedova | (Russia) Elina Avanesyan (Belarus) Anna Kubareva | 3–6, 5–7 |
| Win | 3–1 | Aug 2021 | ITF Monastir, Tunisia | W15 | Hard | (Russia) Ekaterina Reyngold | (Italy) Asya Colombo (Italy) Beatrice Stagno | 6–1, 6–1 |
| Win | 4–1 | Aug 2021 | ITF Monastir, Tunisia | W15 | Hard | (Brazil) Ingrid Martins | (Japan) Sakura Hondo (Japan) Yuka Hosoki | 6–2, 6–0 |
| Loss | 4–2 | Sep 2021 | ITF Monastir, Tunisia | W15 | Hard | (Brazil) Ingrid Martins | (China) Ma Yexin (Japan) Moyuka Uchijima | 2–6, 6–2, [6–10] |
| Win | 5–2 | Nov 2021 | ITF Antalya, Turkey | W15 | Clay | (Spain) Claudia Hoste Ferrer | (Slovakia) Romana Čisovská (Russia) Daria Lodikova | 6–2, 6–4 |
| Loss | 5–3 | Dec 2021 | ITF Antalya, Turkey | W15 | Clay | (Croatia) Mariana Dražić | (Russia) Ksenia Laskutova (Hungary) Amarissa Tóth | 4–6, 2–6 |
| Loss | 5–4 | May 2023 | ITF Curitiba, Brazil | W15 | Clay | (United States) Sabastiani León | (Brazil) Ana Candiotto (Brazil) Rebeca Pereira | 5–7, 6–3, [3–10] |
| Win | 6–4 | May 2023 | ITF Recife, Brazil | W15 | Clay | (United States) Sabastiani León | (Argentina) Luciana Blatter (Argentina) Martina Roldán | 6–1, 6–3 |
| Loss | 6–5 | Jun 2023 | ITF Kuršumlijska Banja, Serbia | W25 | Clay | (Russia) Ekaterina Reyngold | (Greece) Valentini Grammatikopoulou (Russia) Sofya Lansere | 3–6, 2–6 |
| Win | 7–5 | Apr 2024 | ITF Mosquera, Colombia | W35 | Clay | (Mexico) María Portillo Ramírez | (Italy) Nicole Fossa Huergo (Argentina) Miriana Tona | 6–3, 6–2 |
| Win | 8–5 | Apr 2024 | ITF Anapoima, Colombia | W35 | Clay | (Mexico) María Portillo Ramírez | (Italy) Nicole Fossa Huergo (Argentina) Miriana Tona | 6–4, 6–3 |
| Loss | 8–6 | May 2024 | ITF Rio Claro, Brazil | W15 | Clay | (Peru) Lucciana Pérez | (Brazil) Rebeca Pereira (Ecuador) Camila Romero | 3–6, 1–6 |
| Win | 9–6 | Jun 2024 | ITF Maringá, Brazil | W15 | Clay | (Peru) Lucciana Pérez | (Brazil) Camilla Bossi (Brazil) Letícia Garcia Vidal | 6–2, 6–1 |
| Win | 10–6 | Jul 2024 | ITF Luján, Argentina | W15 | Clay | (Peru) Lucciana Pérez | (Peru) Romina Ccuno (Argentina) María Florencia Urrutia | 6–4, 7–5 |
| Loss | 10–7 | Aug 2024 | ITF Chacabuco, Argentina | W35 | Clay | (Peru) Lucciana Pérez | (Argentina) Luisina Giovannini (Mexico) Marian Gómez Pezuela | w/o |
| Win | 11–7 | Aug 2024 | ITF Arequipa, Peru | W50 | Clay | (Peru) Lucciana Pérez | (France) Tiantsoa Rakotomanga Rajaonah (Netherlands) Lian Tran | 5–7, 6–3, [10–1] |
| Loss | 11–8 | May 2025 | ITF Portorož, Slovenia | W50 | Clay | (Italy) Aurora Zantedeschi | (United States) Rasheeda McAdoo (Greece) Sapfo Sakellaridi | 4–6, 3–6 |
| Loss | 11–9 | Jul 2025 | ITF Horb, Germany | W35 | Clay | (Brazil) Rebeca Pereira | (Germany) Tessa Brockmann (Germany) Josy Daems | 7–5, 2–6, [2–10] |
| Loss | 11–10 | Sep 2025 | ITF São Paulo, Brazil | W35 | Clay | (Colombia) María Paulina Pérez | (Brazil) Ana Candiotto (Brazil) Nauhany Vitória Leme da Silva | 4–6, 2–6 |
| Win | 12–10 | Oct 2025 | ITF São João da Boa Vista, Brazil | W15 | Clay | (Colombia) María Paulina Pérez | (Brazil) Júlia Konishi Camargo Silva (Brazil) Rebeca Pereira | 6–3, 6–7^{(3)}, [10–7] |
| Loss | 12–11 | Jan 2026 | Vero Beach Open, United States | W75 | Clay | (United States) Anna Rogers | (United States) Allura Zamarripa (United States) Maribella Zamarripa | w/o |
| Win | 13–11 | Mar 2026 | ITF Chihuahua, Mexico | W50 | Clay | (Venezuela) Sofía Cabezas | (Mexico) Victoria Rodríguez (Mexico) Ana Sofía Sánchez | 7–5, 6–0 |

=== ITF Junior Circuit finals ===
Legend
Category G3
Category G4
Category G5

==== Singles: 6–0 ====
| Result | Year | Date | Tournament | Grade | Surface | Opponent | Score |
|---|---|---|---|---|---|---|---|
| Win | 1–0 | Aug 2016 | Villa María, Argentina | G5 | Clay | (Argentina) Azul Agustina Pedemonti | 7–6^{(5)}, 6–2 |
| Win | 2–0 | Oct 2016 | Buenos Aires, Argentina | G5 | Clay | (Russia) Anfisa Danilchenko | 6–2, 4–1 ret. |
| Win | 3–0 | May 2019 | La Paz, Bolivia | G4 | Clay | (Chile) Valentina Vásquez | 6–0, 6–2 |
| Win | 4–0 | Jul 2019 | Medellín, Colombia | G5 | Clay | (Colombia) María Parra | 7–5, 6–0 |
| Win | 5–0 | Jul 2019 | Bogotá, Colombia | G3 | Clay | (Peru) Romina Ccuno | 6–1, 6–0 |
| Win | 6–0 | Aug 2019 | Cali, Colombia | G3 | Clay | (Peru) Romina Ccuno | 6–4, 6–3 |

==== Doubles: 4–2 ====
| Result | Year | Date | Tournament | Grade | Surface | Partner | Opponents | Score |
|---|---|---|---|---|---|---|---|---|
| Win | 1–0 | Aug 2016 | Villa María, Argentina | G5 | Clay | (Italy) Andrea Di Palma | (Argentina) Camila Mariel Moreno (Argentina) Azul Agustina Pedemonti | 6–3, 4–6, [10–5] |
| Win | 2–0 | Jun 2017 | Odense, Denmark | G4 | Clay | (Colombia) Jessica Plazas | (Finland) Ella Haavisto (Estonia) Katriin Saar | 4–6, 6–4, [10–8] |
| Loss | 2–1 | Mar 2018 | Mendoza, Argentina | G3 | Clay | (Colombia) Jessica Plazas | (United Kingdom) Holly Fischer (Japan) Natsumi Kawaguchi | 1–6, 2–6 |
| Win | 3–1 | Jul 2019 | Medellín, Colombia | G5 | Clay | (Colombia) María Torres Murcia | (Colombia) Isabella Bolivar Garces (Colombia) Jessica Plazas | 6–4, 6–3 |
| Win | 4–1 | Jul 2019 | Bogotá, Colombia | G3 | Clay | (Peru) Romina Ccuno | (Bolivia) Maria Castedo (Chile) Josefa Fernández | 6–2, 6–4 |
| Loss | 4–2 | Aug 2019 | Cali, Colombia | G3 | Clay | (Peru) Romina Ccuno | (Brazil) Ana Luiza Cruz (Brazil) Isabel Oliveira | 5–7, 6–2, [5–10] |

== National representation ==
Ortenzi made her Fed Cup debut for Argentina in 2019, while the team was competing in the Americas Zone Group I, when she was 17 years and 79 days old.

=== Fed Cup ===
Group membership
World Group
World Group Play-off
World Group II
World Group II Play-off
Americas Group (3–3)

| class="col-break " style=" padding-left: 0.75em;" |

Matches by surface
Hard (3–1)
Clay (0–2)

Matches by type
Singles (1–0)
Doubles (2–3)

Matches by setting
Indoors (0–0)
Outdoors (3–3)

==== Singles (1–0) ====
| Edition | Stage | Date | Location | Against | Surface | Opponent | W/L | Score |
|---|---|---|---|---|---|---|---|---|
| 2022 BJK Cup; Americas Zone Group I | Pool A | 15 April 2022 | Salinas, Ecuador | Guatemala | Hard | Kirsten-Andrea Weedon | W | 3–6, 6–3, 6–3 |

==== Doubles (2–3) ====
| Edition | Stage | Date | Location | Against | Surface | Partner | Opponents | W/L | Score |
|---|---|---|---|---|---|---|---|---|---|
| 2019 Fed Cup; Americas Zone Group I | Pool B | 7 February 2019 | Medellín, Colombia | Chile | Clay | Carla Lucero | Bárbara Gatica; Alexa Guarachi | L | 1–6, 1–6 |
| 2019 Fed Cup; Americas Zone Group I | Pool B | 8 February 2019 | Medellín, Colombia | Brazil | Clay | Catalina Pella | Beatriz Haddad Maia; Luisa Stefani | L | 5–7, 3–6 |
| 2022 BJK Cup; Americas Zone Group I | Pool A | 13 April 2022 | Salinas, Ecuador | Colombia | Hard | Julia Riera | Yuliana Lizarazo; María Paulina Pérez | W | 6–4, 6–3 |
| 2022 BJK Cup; Americas Zone Group I | Pool A | 14 April 2022 | Salinas, Ecuador | Brazil | Hard | Julia Riera | Carolina Alves; Beatriz Haddad Maia | L | 3–6, 6–3, 1–6 |
| 2022 BJK Cup; Americas Zone Group I | Pool A | 15 April 2022 | Salinas, Ecuador | Guatemala | Hard | Julia Riera | Gabriela Rivera; Kirsten-Andrea Weedon | W | 7–5, 6–3 |
