= Villa-Lobos State Park =

Park in São Paulo, Brazil

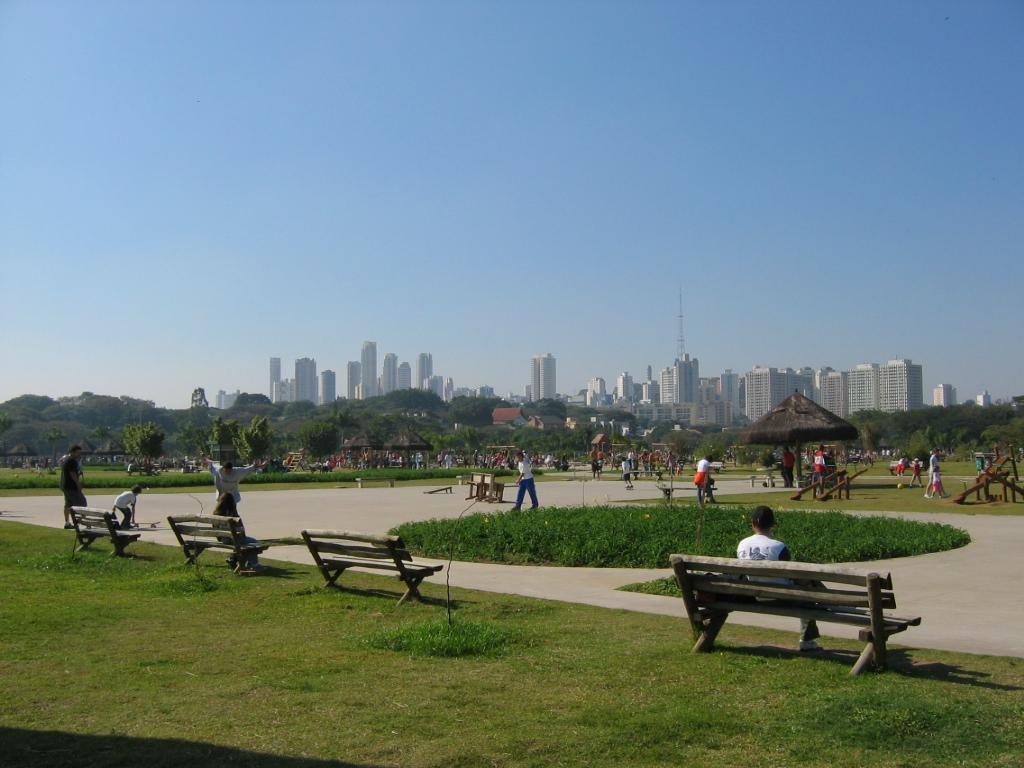
- View towards Marginal Pinheiros

- Location within São Paulo Location within Brazil
- Nearest city: São Paulo
- Coordinates: 23.54667°S 46.72111°W
- Area: 732,000 square metres (7,880,000 sq ft)
- Created: 1989
- Website: www.ambiente.sp.gov.br/parquevillalobos/

Villa-Lobos State Park (Portuguese: Parque Estadual Villa-Lobos) is a park in São Paulo, Brazil. It is named after composer Heitor Villa-Lobos, and is located next to Pinheiros River. It was created in 1989 on a site that was previously used as a rubbish tip. The park now has around 37,000 trees. It hosted the annual Aberto de São Paulo from 2001 until 2014 and in 2025 started to host the SP Open.

== Location ==
The park is located the Alto de Pinheiros district to the west of the centre of São Paulo.

== History ==
In the late 1980s the area where the park is now located was used as a rubbish tip. The western area was used by the Companhia de Entrepostos e Armazéns Gerais do Estado de São Paulo (Company of Warehouses and General Warehouses of the State of São Paulo, CEAGESP) for their garbage disposal, and around 80 families were scavenging for food and packaging there. The central part was used as a waste dump for civil construction, and the eastern part was used to hold dredged material from the Pinheiros river.

The first studies to turn the area into a park were carried out in 1987 as part of the centenary of Heitor Villa-Lobos's birth. State decrees allocated 732,000 square metres (7,880,000 sq ft) to create the park, dedicated to leisure, culture and sport. The Departamento de Águas e Energia Elétrica (Department of Water and Electric Power, DAEE) started to clear the site in 1989, removing the families that were living there, and 500,000 cubic metres (18,000,000 ft^{3}) of debris that was larger than 1 metre (3.3 ft) diameter. The site was landscaped by moving 2,000,000 cubic metres (71,000,000 ft^{3}) of earth. The Boaçava creek, which runs through the site, was channelized.

The new park was designed by Décio Tozzi, with a "music city" theme.

The administration of the park was changed in January 2004 to the Secretaria do Meio Ambiente (State Department of Environment, SMA) of São Paulo state, with emergency maintenance carried out at the park in the same year, and the possibility of extending the park was started to be investigated. In 2011 plans were announced to expand the park by 20% by incorporating a 123,000 square metres (1,320,000 sq ft) area currently used for the construction of Line 4 of the São Paulo Metro.

Around 5,000 people visit the park each day during the week, around 20,000 people during weekends, and around 30,000 people during holidays.

== Features ==
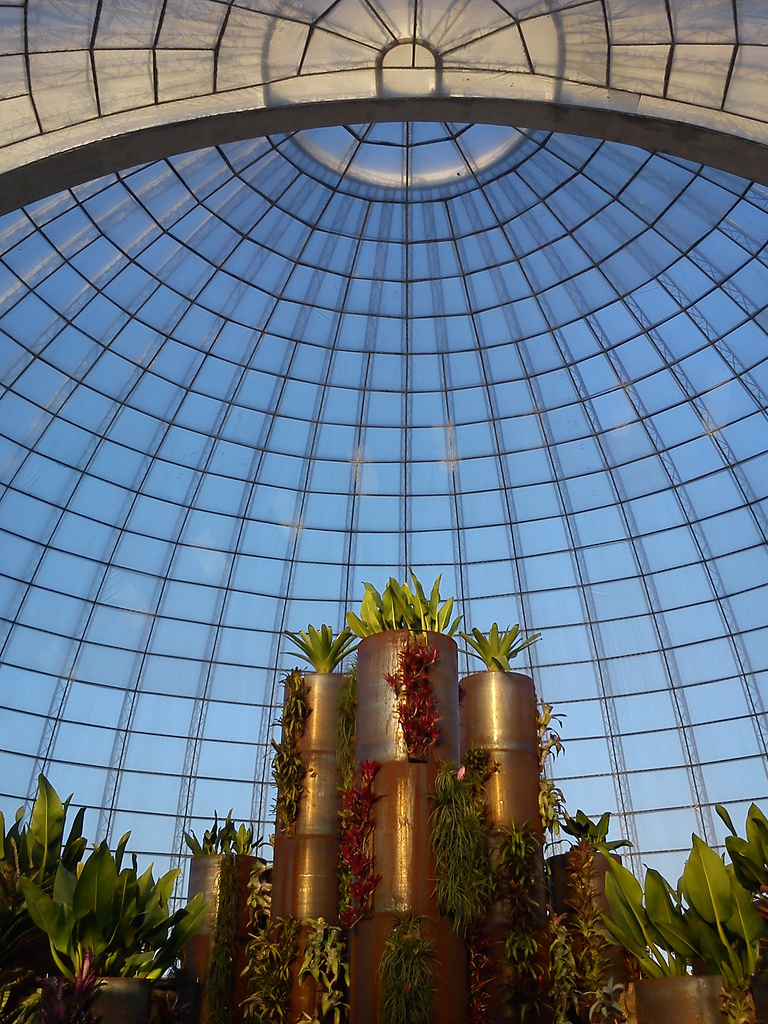
Inside Orquidário Ruth Cardoso

=== Environment ===
The park has a bird nursery, musical island, playgrounds, and around 37,000 trees native to the Atlantic Forest. Parts of the park have audio playback of sounds by Heitor Villa-Lobos. It was one of the first accessible parks in the city. The "Circuito das Árvores" is a 120 metres (390 ft)-long elevated walkway through trees at heights up to 3.5 metres (11 ft).

=== Buildings ===
There are a number of buildings in the park including:

- Exhibition building for Ballet and Music Schools, including instrument manufacture and repair workshops
- Villa Ambiental, an environmental education space
- Open amphitheatre with 750 seats
- Auditoriums
- Shops
- Center of Musical Coexistence
- Park administration headquarters
- 1st Company of the 23rd Military Police Battalion headquarters, which was in a temporary building until 1999 when a new headquarters was constructed.
- Orquidário Ruth Cardoso, holding orchids.
- Villa-Lobos Park Library, covering 4,000 square metres (43,000 sq ft), with a lending library, study areas, and a cultural program.

=== Sports facilities ===
The park has a bike path, a jogging track, hiking trails, football fields, street basketball courts, tennis courts, and gym equipment.
