= Tiantsoa Rakotomanga Rajaonah =

Malagasy born French tennis player (born 2005)

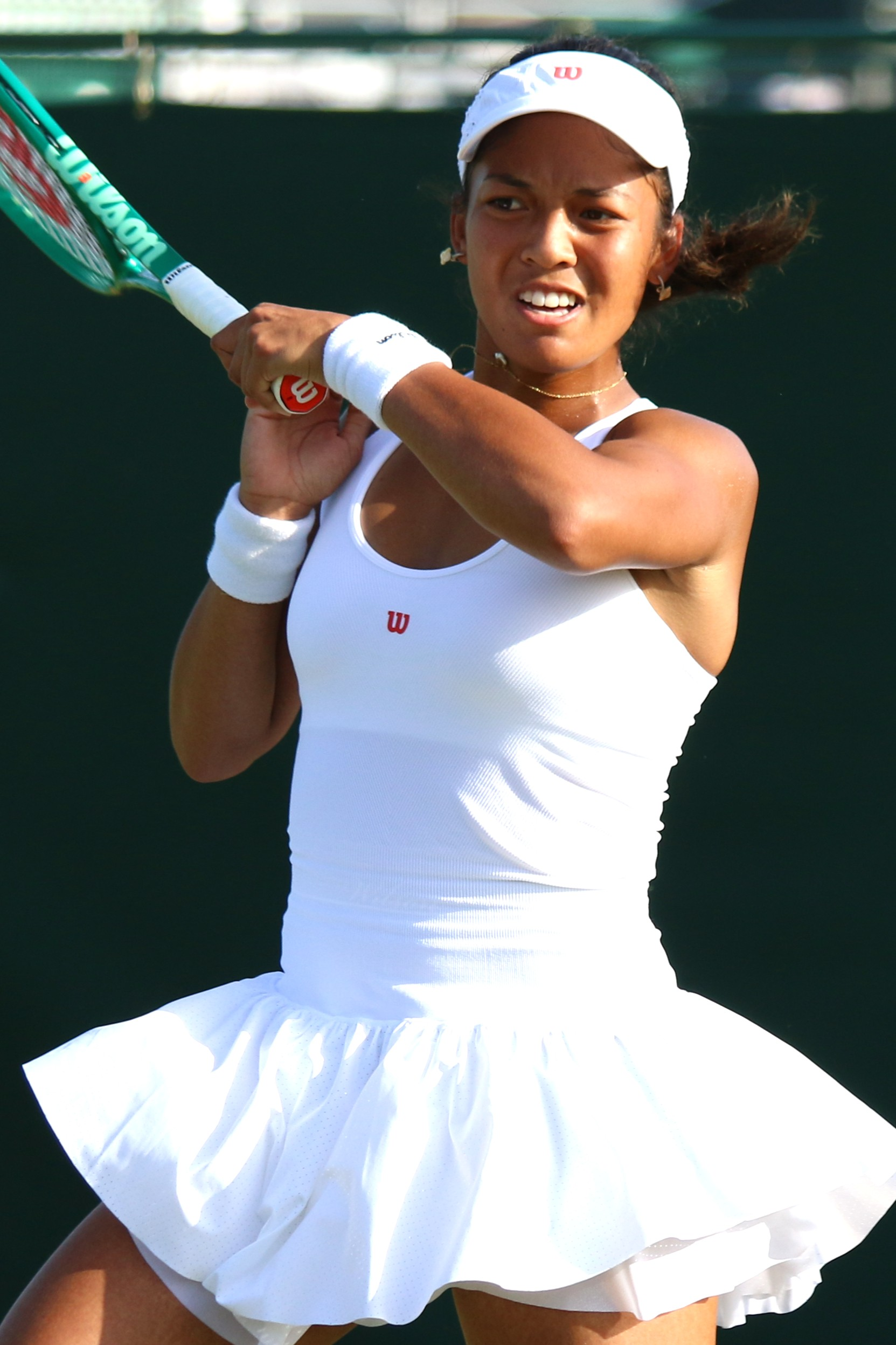
- Rakotomanga Rajaonah at the 2026 Wimbledon Championships
- Country (sports): France
- Born: 15 December 2005 (age 20) Antsirabe, Madagascar
- Plays: Left (two-handed backhand)
- Prize money: $583,314

Singles
- Career record: 128–92
- Career titles: 1
- Highest ranking: No. 116 (2 February 2026)
- Current ranking: No. 354 (21 September 2026)

Grand Slam singles results
- Australian Open: 1R (2026)
- French Open: 1R (2025, 2026)
- Wimbledon: Q2 (2026)
- US Open: Q1 (2025)

Doubles
- Career record: 71–64
- Career titles: 1 WTA Challenger
- Highest ranking: No. 149 (20 April 2026)
- Current ranking: No. 205 (21 September 2026)

Grand Slam doubles results
- French Open: 1R (2024, 2025, 2026)

Grand Slam mixed doubles results
- French Open: 1R (2026)
- Last updated on: 21 September 2026.

Tiantsoa Sarah "Titi" Rakotomanga Rajaonah (born 15 December 2005) is a French professional tennis player. She has a career-high WTA singles ranking of No. 116, achieved on 2 February 2026, and a best in doubles of No. 149, reached on 20 April 2026.

Rakotomanga Rajaonah has won one WTA Tour singles title at the 2025 SP Open, as well as one doubles title on the WTA Challenger Tour.

== Personal life ==
Rakotomanga Rajaonah is of Malagasy origin, born in Antsirabe, Madagascar, but now trains in Toulouse and Plaisir, France.

She began playing tennis at the age of six and has cited her idols growing up as Rafael Nadal and Serena Williams.

== Career ==
Rakotomanga Rajaonah has found significant success in singles, claiming titles at various ITF events. Her first title was at a W15 tournament in Valencia, Spain, in December 2022. Following that, she secured another victory at the W15 event in Melilla, Spain, in December 2023. In March 2024, she added to her accolades with a win at the W15 tournament in Gonesse, France, and in August 2024, she triumphed at the W50 event in Arequipa, Peru.

Her first doubles title came with a win at Valencia, alongside Martina Genis Salas in December 2023. She then teamed up with Elena Ruxandra Bertea to win a W15 tournament in Le Havre, France, in March 2024. Additionally, she triumphed with Émeline Dartron at the W75 Saint-Gaudens Open, in both May 2024 and again in May 2025.

Rakotomanga Rajaonah made her WTA Tour debut as a qualifier at the 2025 Rouen Open, defeating Lucia Bronzetti and Jaqueline Cristian to reach her first WTA Tour quarterfinal. As a result, she reached the top 250 in the rankings, on 21 April 2025.

On 14 September 2025, she claimed her first WTA Tour title at the SP Open by defeating Janice Tjen in the final. After winning the title, Rakotomanga Rajaonah achieved a career-high ranking of world No. 131, before she peaked at No. 122 on 3 November 2025.

== Grand Slam singles performance timeline ==
Key
W	F	SF	QF	#R	RR	Q#	DNQ	A	NH

(W) winner; (F) finalist; (SF) semifinalist; (QF) quarterfinalist; (#R) rounds 4, 3, 2, 1; (RR) round-robin stage; (Q#) qualification round; (DNQ) did not qualify; (A) absent; (NH) not held; (SR) strike rate (events won / competed); (W–L) win–loss record.
To avoid confusion and double counting, these charts are updated at the conclusion of a tournament or when the player's participation has ended.

Tournament	2024	2025	2026	W–L
Australian Open	A	A	1R	0–1
French Open	Q1	1R	1R	0–3
Wimbledon	A	A	Q2	1–1
US Open	A	Q1	A	0–1
Win–loss	0–1	0–2	1–3	1–6

== WTA Tour finals ==
=== Singles: 1 (title) ===
Legend WTA 250 (1–0)	Finals by surface Hard (1–0)	Finals by setting Outdoor (1–0)

Result	Date	Tournament	Tier	Surface	Opponent	Score
Win	Sep 2025	SP Open, Brazil	WTA 250	Hard	(Indonesia) Janice Tjen	6–3, 6–4

== WTA 125 finals ==
=== Doubles: 1 (title) ===
Result	Date	Tournament	Surface	Partner	Opponents	Score
Win	Oct 2025	Samsun Open, Turkiye	Hard	(Switzerland) Naïma Karamoko	(United Kingdom) Harriet Dart (United Kingdom) Maia Lumsden	7–5, 1–6, [10–6]

== ITF Circuit finals ==
=== Singles: 11 (4 titles, 7 runner-ups) ===
Legend W100 tournaments (0–1) W50 tournaments (1–2) W35 tournaments (0–1) W15 tournaments (3–3)	Finals by surface Hard (0–2) Clay (4–5)

Result	W–L	Date	Tournament	Tier	Surface	Opponent	Score
Win	1–0	Dec 2022	ITF Valencia, Spain	W15	Clay	(Spain) Alba Rey García	6–3, 4–6, 6–3
Loss	1–1	Dec 2023	ITF Valencia, Spain	W15	Clay	(Germany) Chantal Sauvant	4–6, 7–6^{(12–10)}, 3–6
Loss	1–2	Dec 2023	ITF Valencia, Spain	W15	Clay	(Spain) Ruth Roura Llaverias	5–7, 2–6
Win	2–2	Dec 2023	ITF Melilla, Spain	W15	Clay	(Portugal) Inês Murta	6–2, ret.
Win	3–2	Mar 2024	ITF Gonesse, France	W15	Clay	(France) Émeline Dartron	6–4, 6–3
Loss	3–3	Mar 2024	ITF Le Havre, France	W15	Clay	(France) Alice Tubello	3–6, 6–1, 3–6
Win	4–3	Aug 2024	ITF Arequipa, Peru	W50	Clay	(Argentina) Jazmín Ortenzi	6–4, 6–4
Loss	4–4	Nov 2024	ITF Villeneuve-d'Ascq, France	W35	Hard (i)	(France) Émeline Dartron	2–6, 7–5, 3–6
Loss	4–5	Feb 2025	ITF Mâcon, France	W50	Hard (i)	(Austria) Sinja Kraus	0–6, 5–7
Loss	4–6	Mar 2025	ITF Bujumbura, Burundi	W50	Clay	(Burundi) Sada Nahimana	3–6, 2–6
Loss	4–7	Jun 2025	Open de Biarritz, France	W100	Clay	(Egypt) Mayar Sherif	5–7, 4–6

=== Doubles: 7 (4 titles, 3 runner-ups) ===
Legend W75 tournaments (1–1) W50 tournaments (0–2) W35 tournaments (1–0) W15 tournaments (2–0)	Finals by surface Clay (4–3)

Result	W–L	Date	Tournament	Tier	Surface	Partner	Opponents	Score
Win	1–0	Dec 2023	ITF Valencia, Spain	W15	Clay	(Spain) Martina Genis Salas	(Italy) Enola Chiesa (Italy) Alessandra Mazzola	2–6, 6–2, [10–8]
Win	2–0	Mar 2024	ITF Le Havre, France	W15	Clay	(Romania) Elena Ruxandra Bertea	(Serbia) Bojana Marinković (Germany) Antonia Schmidt	7–5, 6–1
Win	3–0	May 2024	Open Saint-Gaudens, France	W75	Clay	(France) Émeline Dartron	(France) Estelle Cascino (France) Carole Monnet	6–3, 1–6, [12–10]
Win	4–0	Aug 2024	ITF Arequipa, Peru	W35	Clay	(Peru) Dana Guzmán	(Spain) Alicia Herrero Liñana (United States) Gabriella Price	3–6, 6–4, [10–6]
Loss	4–1	Aug 2024	ITF Arequipa, Peru	W50	Clay	(Netherlands) Lian Tran	(Peru) Lucciana Pérez (Argentina) Jazmín Ortenzi	7–5, 3–6, [1–10]
Loss	4–2	Mar 2025	ITF Bujumbura, Burundi	W50	Clay	(France) Émeline Dartron	(United States) Julia Adams; Anna Ureke	1–6, 2–6
Loss	4–3	May 2025	Open Saint-Gaudens, France	W75	Clay	(France) Émeline Dartron	(Czech Republic) Gabriela Knutson (Czech Republic) Anna Sisková	2–6, 2–6
