= 2022 Oeiras Ladies Open =

Tennis tournament

- Date: 4–10 April 2022
- Edition: 2nd
- Category: ITF Women's World Tennis Tour
- Prize money: $80,000
- Surface: Clay / Outdoor
- Location: Oeiras, Portugal

Champions

Singles
- (Italy) Elisabetta Cocciaretto

Doubles
- (Poland) Katarzyna Piter / (Belgium) Kimberley Zimmermann
← 2021 ·	Oeiras Ladies Open	· 2023 →

The 2022 Oeiras Ladies Open was a professional tennis tournament played on outdoor clay courts. It was the second edition of the tournament which was part of the 2022 ITF Women's World Tennis Tour. It took place in Oeiras, Portugal between 4 and 10 April 2022.

== Singles main draw entrants ==
=== Seeds ===
Country	Player	Rank^{1}	Seed
	Varvara Gracheva	71	1
~~FRA~~	~~Clara Burel~~	~~82~~	~~2~~
~~FRA~~	~~Océane Dodin~~	~~97~~	~~3~~
FRA	Diane Parry	98	4
FRA	Kristina Mladenovic	100	5
	Vitalia Diatchenko	105	6
FRA	Chloé Paquet	106	7
HUN	Dalma Gálfi	107	8

- ^{1} Rankings are as of 21 March 2022.

=== Other entrants ===
The following players received wildcards into the singles main draw:

- (Portugal) Matilde Jorge
- (Portugal) Francisca Jorge
- (Portugal) Ana Filipa Santos
- (Serbia) Natalija Stevanović

The following player received entry using a junior exempt:

- (Croatia) Petra Marčinko

The following player received entry as a special exempt:

- (France) Léolia Jeanjean

The following players received entry from the qualifying draw:

- (Italy) Elisabetta Cocciaretto
- (Brazil) Ingrid Gamarra Martins
- (Germany) Katharina Gerlach
- (Lithuania) Justina Mikulskytė
- (Romania) Andreea Mitu
- (United States) Ashley Lahey
- (Italy) Stefania Rubini
- (Germany) Nastasja Schunk

The following players received entry as lucky losers:

- (United Kingdom) Alicia Barnett
- (Spain) Jéssica Bouzas Maneiro
- Natalia Vikhlyantseva

== Champions ==
=== Singles ===
- (Italy) Elisabetta Cocciaretto def. (Bulgaria) Viktoriya Tomova, 7–6^{(7–5)}, 2–6, 7–5

=== Doubles ===
- (Poland) Katarzyna Piter / (Belgium) Kimberley Zimmermann def. (Germany) Katharina Gerlach / (Serbia) Natalija Stevanović 6–1, 6–1
