= 2021 Oeiras Ladies Open – Singles =

Singles
- 2021 Oeiras Ladies Open

Final
- Champion: (Slovenia) Polona Hercog
- Runner-up: (France) Clara Burel
- Score: Walkover

Events
Singles	Doubles
Oeiras Ladies Open	· 2022 →

This was the first edition of the tournament.

Polona Hercog won the title after Clara Burel withdrew before the final.

== Seeds ==
All seeds receive a bye into the second round.

1. (Slovenia) Polona Hercog (champion)
2. (Belgium) Greet Minnen (third round)
3. (Ukraine) Anhelina Kalinina (semifinals)
4. (Turkey) Çağla Büyükakçay (withdrew)
5. (France) Clara Burel (final, withdrew)
6. (Luxembourg) Mandy Minella (second round)
7. (France) Chloé Paquet (second round)
8. (Spain) Georgina García Pérez (semifinals)
9. (Georgia (country)) Mariam Bolkvadze (second round)
10. (Slovakia) Rebecca Šramková (third round)
11. (Ukraine) Daria Snigur (third round)
12. (Serbia) Natalija Kostić (third round)
13. (United Kingdom) Francesca Jones (quarterfinals)
14. (Italy) Martina Di Giuseppe (second round)
15. (Russia) Marina Melnikova (second round)
16. (China) Lu Jiajing (second round)

== Draw ==
=== Key ===
- Q = Qualifier
- WC = Wild card
- LL = Lucky loser
- Alt = Alternate
- SE = Special exempt
- PR = Protected ranking
- ITF = ITF entry
- JE = Junior exempt
- w/o = Walkover
- r = Retired
- d = Defaulted
- SR = Special ranking

=== Finals ===
Quarterfinals
1	(Slovenia) Polona Hercog	6	6
SE	(Italy) Lucia Bronzetti	3	2
3	(Ukraine) Anhelina Kalinina	6	6
(Spain) Eva Guerrero Álvarez	1	2
5	(France) Clara Burel	5	6	6
13	(United Kingdom) Francesca Jones	7	4	2
8	(Spain) Georgina García Pérez	6	6
(Greece) Despina Papamichail	4	1

Semifinals
1	(Slovenia) Polona Hercog	6	3	6
3	(Ukraine) Anhelina Kalinina	3	6	3
5	(France) Clara Burel	4	6	6
8	(Spain) Georgina García Pérez	6	4	1

Final
1	(Slovenia) Polona Hercog	w/o
5	(France) Clara Burel

=== Top half ===
==== Section 1 ====
First round
(South Korea) N-l Han	2	3
(Georgia (country)) E Gorgodze	6	6
PR	(Romania) A Dulgheru	7^{7}	1	6
(Turkey) P Özgen	6^{3}	6	2
(Netherlands) R Hogenkamp	1	6	2
WC	(Portugal) F Jorge	6	3	6
SE	(Italy) L Bronzetti	7	7
Q	(South Korea) S-j Jang	5	5

Second round
1	(Slovenia) P Hercog	w/o
(Georgia (country)) E Gorgodze
PR	(Romania) A Dulgheru	6	2	6
15	(Russia) M Melnikova	3	6	3
11	(Ukraine) D Snigur	5	6	6
WC	(Portugal) F Jorge	7	4	1
SE	(Italy) L Bronzetti	6	6
6	(Luxembourg) M Minella	3	4

Third round
1	(Slovenia) P Hercog	6	1	6
PR	(Romania) A Dulgheru	4	6	4
11	(Ukraine) D Snigur	2	2
SE	(Italy) L Bronzetti	6	6

Quarterfinals
1	(Slovenia) P Hercog	6	6
SE	(Italy) L Bronzetti	3	2

==== Section 2 ====
First round
Q	(France) D Parry	5	1
Q	(Spain) O Sáez Larra	7	6
Q	(Netherlands) S Lamens	2	6	6
WC	(Brazil) B Haddad Maia	6	4	3
(Spain) I Burillo Escorihuela	6	6
Q	(Germany) S Wagner	4	1
(Spain) E Guerrero Álvarez	1	7	6
(Croatia) T Mrdeža	6	5	4

Second round
3	(Ukraine) A Kalinina	6	6
Q	(Spain) O Sáez Larra	3	1
Q	(Netherlands) S Lamens	2	6	6
16	(China) Jia Lu	6	3	4
12	(Serbia) N Kostić	6	1	7^{14}
(Spain) I Burillo Escorihuela	1	6	6^{12}
(Spain) E Guerrero Álvarez	5	6	6
7	(France) C Paquet	7	1	4

Third round
3	(Ukraine) A Kalinina	6	4	6
Q	(Netherlands) S Lamens	2	6	4
12	(Serbia) N Kostić	4	1
(Spain) E Guerrero Álvarez	6	6

Quarterfinals
3	(Ukraine) A Kalinina	6	6
(Spain) E Guerrero Álvarez	1	2

=== Bottom half ===
==== Section 3 ====
First round
(Switzerland) C Perrin	6	6
(Croatia) T Lukas	0	4
(Russia) V Kan	4	2
(Germany) J Niemeier	6	6
Q	(Italy) F Di Sarra	1	2
(Greece) V Grammatikopoulou	6	6
(Bulgaria) I Shinikova	6^{4}	2
Q	(United States) K Volynets	7^{7}	6

Second round
5	(France) C Burel	6	6
(Switzerland) C Perrin	1	0
(Germany) J Niemeier	6	4	6
9	(Georgia (country)) M Bolkvadze	0	6	4
13	(United Kingdom) F Jones	6	4	6
(Greece) V Grammatikopoulou	3	6	3
Q	(United States) K Volynets	3	6^{4}
LL	(Spain) M Bassols Ribera	6	7^{7}

Third round
5	(France) C Burel	7	7^{7}
(Germany) J Niemeier	5	6^{3}
13	(United Kingdom) F Jones	6	6
LL	(Spain) M Bassols Ribera	3	3

Quarterfinals
5	(France) C Burel	5	6	6
13	(United Kingdom) F Jones	7	4	2

==== Section 4 ====
First round
(Belgium) M Zanevska	6	6
WC	(Portugal) I Murta	0	0
WC	(Portugal) AF Santos	6^{1}	3
WC	(Ukraine) E Hamaliy	7^{7}	6
Q	(Germany) S Herrmann	2	6	6^{6}
(Greece) D Papamichail	6	1	7^{8}
JE	(Andorra) V Jiménez Kasintseva	6	2	0
(Hungary) RL Jani	4	6	6

Second round
8	(Spain) G García Pérez	7^{8}	1	6
(Belgium) M Zanevska	6^{6}	6	4
WC	(Ukraine) E Hamaliy	1	0
10	(Slovakia) R Šramková	6	6
14	(Italy) M Di Giuseppe	1	4
(Greece) D Papamichail	6	6
(Hungary) RL Jani	4	5
2	(Belgium) G Minnen	6	7

Third round
8	(Spain) G García Pérez	6	6
10	(Slovakia) R Šramková	2	4
(Greece) D Papamichail	6	6
2	(Belgium) G Minnen	4	0

Quarterfinals
8	(Spain) G García Pérez	6	6
(Greece) D Papamichail	4	1
