= 2023 Oeiras Ladies Open =

Tennis tournament

- Date: 17–23 April 2023
- Edition: 3rd
- Category: ITF Women's World Tennis Tour
- Prize money: $100,000
- Surface: Clay / Outdoor
- Location: Oeiras, Portugal

Champions

Singles
- (Montenegro) Danka Kovinić

Doubles
- (Norway) Ulrikke Eikeri / (Japan) Eri Hozumi
← 2022 ·	Oeiras Ladies Open	· 2024 →

The 2023 Oeiras Ladies Open was a professional tennis tournament played on outdoor clay courts. It was the third edition of the tournament, which was part of the 2023 ITF Women's World Tennis Tour. It took place in Oeiras, Portugal, between 17 and 23 April 2023.

== Champions ==
=== Singles ===
- (Montenegro) Danka Kovinić def. (Spain) Rebeka Masarova, 6–2, 6–2

=== Doubles ===
- (Norway) Ulrikke Eikeri / (Japan) Eri Hozumi def. (Portugal) Francisca Jorge / (Portugal) Matilde Jorge, 4–6, 6–4, [10–5]

== Singles main draw entrants ==
=== Seeds ===
Country	Player	Rank	Seed
CZE	Marie Bouzková	34	1
CZE	Linda Nosková	53	2
EGY	Mayar Sherif	61	3
	Anna Blinkova	63	4
MNE	Danka Kovinić	73	5
ESP	Nuria Párrizas Díaz	80	6
ITA	Sara Errani	85	7
HUN	Anna Bondár	87	8

- Rankings are as of 10 April 2023.

=== Other entrants ===
The following players received wildcards into the singles main draw:

- (Canada) Eugenie Bouchard
- (Portugal) Matilde Jorge
- (Ukraine) Elina Svitolina

The following player received entry into the singles main draw using a protected ranking:

- (France) Amandine Hesse

The following players received entry from the qualifying draw:

- (Bosnia and Herzegovina) Nefisa Berberović
- (Malta) Francesca Curmi
- (South Africa) Isabella Kruger
- (Czech Republic) Jesika Malečková
- (Germany) Luisa Meyer auf der Heide
- (Lithuania) Justina Mikulskytė
- (Spain) Nuria Párrizas Díaz
- (France) Margaux Rouvroy

The following player received entry as a lucky loser:

- (Spain) Lucía Cortez Llorca
