= 2025 Oeiras Ladies Open – Doubles =

Doubles
- 2025 Oeiras Ladies Open

Final
- Champions: (Portugal) Francisca Jorge (Portugal) Matilde Jorge
- Runners-up: (Czech Republic) Anastasia Dețiuc (Romania) Patricia Maria Țig
- Score: 6–1, 6–2

Events
Singles	Doubles
← 2024 ·	Oeiras Ladies Open	· 2026 →

Defending champions Francisca and Matilde Jorge won the title, defeating Anastasia Dețiuc and Patricia Maria Țig in the final, 6–1, 6–2.

== Seeds ==
1. Amina Anshba / Elena Pridankina (quarterfinals)
2. (Portugal) Francisca Jorge / (Portugal) Matilde Jorge (champions)
3. (Czech Republic) Jesika Malečková / (Czech Republic) Miriam Škoch (quarterfinals)
4. (United States) Carmen Corley / (United States) Christina Rosca (semifinals)

== Draw ==
=== Key ===
- Q = Qualifier
- WC = Wild card
- LL = Lucky loser
- Alt = Alternate
- SE = Special exempt
- PR = Protected ranking
- ITF = ITF entry
- JE = Junior exempt
- w/o = Walkover
- r = Retired
- d = Defaulted
- SR = Special ranking

=== Draw ===
First round
1	A Anshba; E Pridankina	6	5	[12]
WC	(Portugal) I Murta (Portugal) A Voloshchuk	1	7	[10]
(Czech Republic) A Dețiuc (Romania) PM Țig	6	0	[10]
(United Kingdom) A Barnett (France) E Lechemia	4	6	[6]
3	(Czech Republic) J Malečková (Czech Republic) M Škoch	7^{7}	6
(Hungary) L Udvardy (Hungary) P Udvardy	6^{4}	3
(Czech Republic) M Bayerlová (Colombia) MP Pérez	2	3
(Poland) M Chwalińska (Austria) S Kraus	6	6
A Ibragimova (Netherlands) L Tran	1	6	[10]
(India) R Bhosale (New Zealand) PM Hourigan	6	2	[7]
(Philippines) A Eala (United States) K Volynets	3	4
4	(United States) C Corley (United States) C Rosca	6	6
(Brazil) I Martins (Slovenia) T Zidanšek	7^{10}	4	[10]
(France) E Cascino (Germany) N Noha Akugue	6^{8}	6	[5]
(Croatia) L Ćirić Bagarić (Serbia) L Radivojević	7	6^{5}	[7]
2	(Portugal) F Jorge (Portugal) M Jorge	5	7^{7}	[10]

Quarterfinals
1	A Anshba; E Pridankina	2	5
(Czech Republic) A Dețiuc (Romania) PM Țig	6	7
3	(Czech Republic) J Malečková (Czech Republic) M Škoch	5	4
(Poland) M Chwalińska (Austria) S Kraus	7	6
A Ibragimova (Netherlands) L Tran	3	4
4	(United States) C Corley (United States) C Rosca	6	6
(Brazil) I Martins (Slovenia) T Zidanšek	3	5
2	(Portugal) F Jorge (Portugal) M Jorge	6	7

Semifinals
(Czech Republic) A Dețiuc (Romania) PM Țig	6	6
(Poland) M Chwalińska (Austria) S Kraus	2	2
4	(United States) C Corley (United States) C Rosca	3	4
2	(Portugal) F Jorge (Portugal) M Jorge	6	6

Final
(Czech Republic) A Dețiuc (Romania) PM Țig	1	2
2	(Portugal) F Jorge (Portugal) M Jorge	6	6
