= 2021 Oeiras Ladies Open =

Tennis tournament

- Date: 12–18 April 2021
- Edition: 1st
- Category: ITF Women's World Tennis Tour
- Prize money: $60,000
- Surface: Clay
- Location: Oeiras, Portugal

Champions

Singles
- (Slovenia) Polona Hercog

Doubles
- (Belarus) Lidziya Marozava / (Romania) Andreea Mitu
- Oeiras Ladies Open

The 2021 Oeiras Ladies Open was a professional women's tennis tournament played on outdoor clay courts. It was the first edition of the tournament which was part of the 2021 ITF Women's World Tennis Tour. It took place in Oeiras, Portugal between 12 and 18 April 2021.

== Singles main-draw entrants ==
=== Seeds ===
Country	Player	Rank^{1}	Seed
SLO	Polona Hercog	60	1
BEL	Greet Minnen	117	2
UKR	Anhelina Kalinina	161	3
~~TUR~~	~~Çağla Büyükakçay~~	~~173~~	~~4~~
FRA	Clara Burel	175	5
LUX	Mandy Minella	184	6
FRA	Chloé Paquet	186	7
ESP	Georgina García Pérez	194	8
GEO	Mariam Bolkvadze	195	9
SVK	Rebecca Šramková	196	10
UKR	Daria Snigur	197	11
SRB	Natalija Kostić	199	12
GBR	Francesca Jones	200	13
ITA	Martina Di Giuseppe	201	14
RUS	Marina Melnikova	203	15
CHN	Lu Jiajing	210	16

- ^{1} Rankings are as of 5 April 2021.

=== Other entrants ===
The following players received wildcards into the singles main draw:

- (Brazil) Beatriz Haddad Maia
- (Ukraine) Elizabet Hamaliy
- (Portugal) Francisca Jorge
- (Portugal) Inês Murta
- (Portugal) Ana Filipa Santos

The following player received entry using a protected ranking:

- (Romania) Alexandra Dulgheru

The following player received entry using a junior exempt:

- (Andorra) Victoria Jiménez Kasintseva

The following player received entry using as a special exempt:

- (Italy) Lucia Bronzetti

The following players received entry from the qualifying draw:

- (Italy) Federica Di Sarra
- (Germany) Sina Herrmann
- (South Korea) Jang Su-jeong
- (Netherlands) Suzan Lamens
- (France) Diane Parry
- (Spain) Olga Sáez Larra
- (United States) Katie Volynets
- (Germany) Stephanie Wagner

The following player received entry as a lucky loser:

- (Spain) Marina Bassols Ribera

== Champions ==
=== Singles ===
- (Slovenia) Polona Hercog def. (France) Clara Burel, walkover

=== Doubles ===
- (Belarus) Lidziya Marozava / (Romania) Andreea Mitu def. (Russia) Marina Melnikova / (Switzerland) Conny Perrin, 3–6, 6–4, [10–3]
