= 2018 ITF Women's Circuit – Baotou =

- Date: 21–27 May
- Edition: 1st
- Category: ITF Women's Circuit
- Prize money: $60,000
- Surface: Clay / Indoor
- Location: Baotou, China

Champions

Singles
- (Serbia) Nina Stojanović

Doubles
- (Australia) Alison Bai / (Bulgaria) Aleksandrina Naydenova
ITF Women's Circuit – Baotou	· 2019 →

The 2018 ITF Women's Circuit – Baotou was a professional tennis tournament played on indoor clay courts. It was the first edition of the tournament and was part of the 2018 ITF Women's Circuit. It took place in Baotou, China, on 21–27 May 2018.

== Singles main draw entrants ==
=== Seeds ===
Country	Player	Rank^{1}	Seed
CHN	Zhu Lin	120	1
THA	Peangtarn Plipuech	226	2
CHN	Xun Fangying	265	3
JPN	Mari Osaka	293	4
JPN	Erika Sema	296	5
JPN	Mai Minokoshi	306	6
SRB	Nina Stojanović	309	7
CHN	Zhang Yuxuan	317	8

- ^{1} Rankings as of 14 May 2018.

=== Other entrants ===
The following players received a wildcard into the singles main draw:

- (China) Ma Shuyue
- (China) Ma Yexin
- (China) Qi Jiatian
- (China) Zhang Ying

The following players received entry from the qualifying draw:

- (China) Feng Shuo
- (China) Guo Meiqi
- (China) Jiang Xinyu
- (China) Wu Meixu

== Champions ==
=== Singles ===
- (Serbia) Nina Stojanović def. (China) Xu Shilin, 6–0, 6–4

=== Doubles ===
- (Australia) Alison Bai / (Bulgaria) Aleksandrina Naydenova def. (Serbia) Natalija Kostić / (Russia) Nika Kukharchuk, 6–4, 0–6, [10–6]
