= 2018 ITF Women's Circuit – Baotou – Singles =

Baotou – Singles
- 2018 ITF Women's Circuit – Baotou

Final
- Champion: (Serbia) Nina Stojanović
- Runner-up: (China) Xu Shilin
- Score: 6–0, 6–4

Events
Singles	Doubles
ITF Women's Circuit – Baotou	· 2019 →

This was the first edition of the tournament.

Nina Stojanović won the title, defeating Xu Shilin in the final, 6–0, 6–4.

== Seeds ==
1. (China) Zhu Lin (first round)
2. (Thailand) Peangtarn Plipuech (second round)
3. (China) Xun Fangying (first round)
4. (Japan) Mari Osaka (second round)
5. (Japan) Erika Sema (first round)
6. (Japan) Mai Minokoshi (quarterfinals)
7. (Serbia) Nina Stojanović (champion)
8. (China) Zhang Yuxuan (first round)

== Draw ==
=== Key ===
- Q = Qualifier
- WC = Wild card
- LL = Lucky loser
- Alt = Alternate
- SE = Special exempt
- PR = Protected ranking
- ITF = ITF entry
- JE = Junior exempt
- w/o = Walkover
- r = Retired
- d = Defaulted
- SR = Special ranking

=== Finals ===
Semifinals
(China) Zhang Kailin	6^{10}	3
(China) Xu Shilin	7^{12}	6
WC	(China) Ma Shuyue	2	4
7	(Serbia) Nina Stojanović	6	6

Final
(China) Xu Shilin	0	4
7	(Serbia) Nina Stojanović	6	6

=== Top half ===
First round
1	(China) L Zhu	3	1
(China) K Zhang	6	6
Q	(China) M Wu	6	6
WC	(China) J Qi	0	3
WC	(China) Y Ma	6	6^{4}	4
(China) W Zheng	2	7^{7}	6
(China) X You	6	4	7^{7}
5	(Japan) E Sema	2	6	6^{1}
4	(Japan) M Osaka	6	6
Q	(China) X Jiang	0	2
(Russia) N Kukharchuk	6	6
(China) X Sun	0	1
(Australia) O Tjandramulia	4	2
(China) S Xu	6	6
(China) Q Ye	4	6	7
8	(China) Yu Zhang	6	1	5

Second round
(China) K Zhang	1	6	6
Q	(China) M Wu	6	3	3
(China) W Zheng	6	6
(China) X You	4	4
4	(Japan) M Osaka	5	0
(Russia) N Kukharchuk	7	6
(China) S Xu	6	6
(China) Q Ye	3	1

Quarterfinals
(China) K Zhang	6	6
(China) W Zheng	1	3
(Russia) N Kukharchuk	4	1
(China) S Xu	6	6

Semifinals
(China) K Zhang	6^{10}	3
(China) S Xu	7^{12}	6

=== Bottom half ===
First round
6	(Japan) M Minokoshi	4	6	6
(China) M Wang	6	3	3
Q	(China) M Guo	6	6
(Japan) H Kuwata	3	4
(Australia) A Bai	3	4
WC	(China) S Ma	6	6
(Serbia) N Kostić	5	6	6
3	(China) F Xun	7	4	3
7	(Serbia) N Stojanović	6	6
Q	(China) S Feng	1	2
(Bulgaria) A Naydenova	7	6
(India) R Bhosale	5	3
(China) J Kang	1	6^{7}
(Romania) AA Roșca	6	7^{9}
WC	(China) Yi Zhang	6	1	3
2	(Thailand) P Plipuech	1	6	6

Second round
6	(Japan) M Minokoshi	6	6
Q	(China) M Guo	4	2
WC	(China) S Ma	6	3	6
(Serbia) N Kostić	4	6	4
7	(Serbia) N Stojanović	6	6
(Bulgaria) A Naydenova	3	3
(Romania) AA Roșca	6	6
2	(Thailand) P Plipuech	2	1

Quarterfinals
6	(Japan) M Minokoshi	3	6	4
WC	(China) S Ma	6	2	6
7	(Serbia) N Stojanović	6	6
(Romania) AA Roșca	0	4

Semifinals
WC	(China) S Ma	2	4
7	(Serbia) N Stojanović	6	6
