= 2024 Oeiras Ladies Open =

- Date: 15–21 April
- Edition: 4th
- Category: WTA 125
- Prize money: $164,000
- Surface: Clay / Outdoor
- Location: Oeiras, Portugal

Champions

Singles
- (Netherlands) Suzan Lamens

Doubles
- (Portugal) Francisca Jorge / (Portugal) Matilde Jorge
- Oeiras Ladies Open

The 2024 Oeiras Ladies Open was a professional women's tennis tournament played on outdoor clay courts. It was the fourth edition of the tournament and first ever as a WTA 125 event, which was part of the 2024 WTA 125 tournaments. It took place at the Centro Desportivo Nacional do Jamor in Oeiras, Portugal, between 15 and 21 April 2024.

== Singles entrants ==
=== Seeds ===
| Country | Player | Rank | Seed |
|---|---|---|---|
| USA | Bernarda Pera | 82 | 1 |
| ESP | Rebeka Masarova | 83 | 2 |
| ~~ARG~~ | ~~María Lourdes Carlé~~ | ~~84~~ | ~~3~~ |
| DEN | Clara Tauson | 87 | 4 |
| GBR | Harriet Dart | 88 | 5 |
| CHN | Bai Zhuoxuan | 92 | 6 |
| MEX | Renata Zarazúa | 100 | 7 |
| SVK | Rebecca Šramková | 117 | 8 |
| COL | Emiliana Arango | 122 | 9 |

- Rankings are as of 8 April 2024.

=== Other entrants ===
The following players received wildcards into the singles main draw:

- (Portugal) Maria Garcia
- (Portugal) Matilde Jorge
- (France) Kristina Mladenovic
- (Portugal) Ana Filipa Santos

The following players received entry from the qualifying draw:

- (Netherlands) Anouk Koevermans
- ~~(Romania) Gabriela Lee~~
- (Croatia) Tena Lukas
- (United States) Maria Mateas

The following players received entry into the main draw as lucky losers:

- Julia Avdeeva
- (United States) Varvara Lepchenko
- (Canada) Katherine Sebov

=== Withdrawals ===
- (Spain) Jéssica Bouzas Maneiro → replaced by (Portugal) Francisca Jorge
- (Argentina) María Lourdes Carlé → replaced by (Canada) Katherine Sebov
- (Czech Republic) Brenda Fruhvirtová → replaced by (Philippines) Alexandra Eala
- (Czech Republic) Linda Fruhvirtová → replaced by (Italy) Lucrezia Stefanini
- (Switzerland) Viktorija Golubic → replaced by (United Kingdom) Francesca Jones
- (Romania) Gabriela Lee → replaced by Julia Avdeeva
- (United States) Claire Liu → replaced by (Czech Republic) Gabriela Knutson
- (Colombia) Camila Osorio → replaced by Aliona Falei
- (Brazil) Laura Pigossi → replaced by (Austria) Sinja Kraus
- (United States) Katie Volynets → replaced by (France) Léolia Jeanjean → replaced by (United States) Varvara Lepchenko
- (Belgium) Yanina Wickmayer → replaced by (France) Carole Monnet
- (Slovenia) Tamara Zidanšek → replaced by (Netherlands) Suzan Lamens

== Doubles entrants ==
=== Seeds ===
| Country | Player | Country | Player | Rank^{1} | Seed |
|---|---|---|---|---|---|
| CZE | Miriam Kolodziejová | CZE | Anna Sisková | 149 | 1 |
| GBR | Harriet Dart | FRA | Kristina Mladenovic | 186 | 2 |
| THA | Luksika Kumkhum | THA | Peangtarn Plipuech | 244 | 3 |
| GBR | Alicia Barnett | GBR | Freya Christie | 247 | 4 |

- ^{1} Rankings as of 8 April 2024.

=== Other entrants ===
The following team received a wildcard into the doubles main draw:

- (Portugal) Maria Garcia / (Portugal) Ana Filipa Santos

The following team received entry as alternates:

- Aliona Falei / (United States) Varvara Lepchenko

=== Withdrawals ===
- (France) Léolia Jeanjean / (Spain) Nuria Párrizas Díaz → replaced by Aliona Falei / (United States) Varvara Lepchenko

== Champions ==
=== Singles ===
- (Netherlands) Suzan Lamens def. (Denmark) Clara Tauson 6–4, 5–7, 6–4

=== Doubles ===
- (Portugal) Francisca Jorge / (Portugal) Matilde Jorge def. (United Kingdom) Harriet Dart / (France) Kristina Mladenovic, 6–0, 6–4
