= 2025 Oeiras Ladies Open – Singles =

Singles
- 2025 Oeiras Ladies Open

Final
- Champion: (Hungary) Dalma Gálfi
- Runner-up: (United States) Katie Volynets
- Score: 4–6, 6–1, 6–2

Events
Singles	Doubles
← 2024 ·	Oeiras Ladies Open	· 2026 →

Dalma Gálfi won the singles title at the 2025 Oeiras Ladies Open, defeating Katie Volynets in the final, 4–6, 6–1, 6–2.

Suzan Lamens was the reigning champion, but chose to compete in Rouen instead.

== Seeds ==
1. (Philippines) Alexandra Eala (second round)
2. (United States) Katie Volynets (final)
3. (Italy) Elisabetta Cocciaretto (second round)
4. (Hungary) Anna Bondár (second round)
5. (China) Yuan Yue (first round)
6. (Romania) Sorana Cîrstea (withdrew)
7. (Argentina) Solana Sierra (withdrew)
8. (Poland) Maja Chwalińska (first round)

== Draw ==
=== Key ===
- Q = Qualifier
- WC = Wild card
- LL = Lucky loser
- Alt = Alternate
- SE = Special exempt
- PR = Protected ranking
- ITF = ITF entry
- JE = Junior exempt
- w/o = Walkover
- r = Retired
- d = Defaulted
- SR = Special ranking

=== Finals ===
Semifinals
(Hungary) Dalma Gálfi	6	6
(United States) Varvara Lepchenko	4	3
(Switzerland) Simona Waltert	1	4
2	(United States) Katie Volynets	6	6

Final
(Hungary) Dalma Gálfi	4	6	6
2	(United States) Katie Volynets	6	1	2

=== Top half ===
First round
1	(Philippines) A Eala	6	6
(Netherlands) A Koevermans	3	4
(Hungary) P Udvardy	6	6
Q	(Netherlands) L Tran	1	3
Q	(Czech Republic) J Malečková	6	6^{4}	2
(Japan) S Saito	1	7^{7}	6
(Hungary) D Gálfi	6	7
8	(Poland) M Chwalińska	4	5
4	(Hungary) A Bondár	6	7
WC	(Portugal) F Jorge	4	5
E Pridankina	6	6
LL	(Canada) C Branstine	4	2
(Austria) S Kraus	6	6
(Czech Republic) D Šalková	3	2
Q	A Ibragimova	5	3
(United States) V Lepchenko	7	6

Second round
1	(Philippines) A Eala	6^{4}	4
(Hungary) P Udvardy	7^{7}	6
(Japan) S Saito	1	2
(Hungary) D Gálfi	6	6
4	(Hungary) A Bondár	2	6	0
E Pridankina	6	2	6
(Austria) S Kraus	5	2
(United States) V Lepchenko	7	6

Quarterfinals
(Hungary) P Udvardy	6^{8}	1
(Hungary) D Gálfi	7^{10}	6
E Pridankina	3	6	2
(United States) V Lepchenko	6	4	6

Semifinals
(Hungary) D Gálfi	6	6
(United States) V Lepchenko	4	3

=== Bottom half ===
First round
Q	(Germany) N Noha Akugue	7^{7}	1	4
(United Kingdom) F Jones	6^{5}	6	6
(Serbia) N Stojanović	7	6
WC	(Portugal) A Voloshchuk	5	2
(Switzerland) S Waltert	6	4	6
WC	(Portugal) M Jorge	4	6	4
WC	(Portugal) I Murta	3	0
3	(Italy) E Cocciaretto	6	6
5	(China) Y Yuan	6	3	6^{4}
(Andorra) V Jiménez Kasintseva	4	6	7^{7}
(Serbia) L Radivojević	6	6
LL	(Romania) PM Țig	4	1
(Germany) M Barthel	6^{5}	6^{2}
(Slovenia) T Zidanšek	7^{7}	7^{7}
(Italy) G Pedone	2	1
2	(United States) K Volynets	6	6

Second round
(United Kingdom) F Jones	6	3	5
(Serbia) N Stojanović	2	6	7
(Switzerland) S Waltert	6	3	6
3	(Italy) E Cocciaretto	3	6	3
(Andorra) V Jiménez Kasintseva	7^{7}	4	6
(Serbia) L Radivojević	6^{2}	6	3
(Slovenia) T Zidanšek	4	3
2	(United States) K Volynets	6	6

Quarterfinals
(Serbia) N Stojanović	4	6^{5}
(Switzerland) S Waltert	6	7^{7}
(Andorra) V Jiménez Kasintseva	2	1
2	(United States) K Volynets	6	6

Semifinals
(Switzerland) S Waltert	1	4
2	(United States) K Volynets	6	6

== Qualifying ==
=== Seeds ===
1. (Canada) Carson Branstine (qualifying competition, lucky loser)
2. (Romania) Patricia Maria Țig (qualifying competition, lucky loser)
3. Kristina Dmitruk (qualifying competition)
4. (Germany) Noma Noha Akugue (qualified)
5. (Croatia) Lucija Ćirić Bagarić (qualifying competition)
6. Alevtina Ibragimova (qualified)
7. (Netherlands) Lian Tran (qualified)
8. (Czech Republic) Jesika Malečková (qualified)

=== Qualifiers ===
1. (Netherlands) Lian Tran
2. (Czech Republic) Jesika Malečková
3. Alevtina Ibragimova
4. (Germany) Noma Noha Akugue

=== Lucky losers ===
1. (Canada) Carson Branstine
2. (Romania) Patricia Maria Țig

=== Qualifying draw ===
==== First qualifier ====
First round
1	(Canada) Carson Branstine	6	6
(Portugal) Ana Filipa Santos	1	1
WC	(Portugal) Teresa Poppe	1	0
7	(Netherlands) Lian Tran	6	6

Qualifying competition
1	(Canada) Carson Branstine	2	6	3
7	(Netherlands) Lian Tran	6	3	6

==== Second qualifier ====
First round
2	(Romania) Patricia Maria Țig	6	6
Amina Anshba	2	3
WC	(Portugal) Amália Suciu	2	1
8	(Czech Republic) Jesika Malečková	6	6

Qualifying competition
2	(Romania) Patricia Maria Țig	2	1
8	(Czech Republic) Jesika Malečková	6	6

==== Third qualifier ====
First round
3	Kristina Dmitruk	6	6
(India) Rutuja Bhosale	3	4
(Spain) Celia Cerviño Ruiz	3	1
6	Alevtina Ibragimova	6	6

Qualifying competition
3	Kristina Dmitruk	6	5	2
6	Alevtina Ibragimova	3	7	6

==== Fourth qualifier ====
First round
4	(Germany) Noma Noha Akugue	6	4	6
(Hungary) Luca Udvardy	2	6	3
(Portugal) Analu Freitas	1	1
5	(Croatia) Lucija Ćirić Bagarić	6	6

Qualifying competition
4	(Germany) Noma Noha Akugue	6	7
5	(Croatia) Lucija Ćirić Bagarić	1	5
