= 2021 Oeiras Ladies Open – Doubles =

Doubles
- 2021 Oeiras Ladies Open

Final
- Champions: (Belarus) Lidziya Marozava (Romania) Andreea Mitu
- Runners-up: (Russia) Marina Melnikova (Switzerland) Conny Perrin
- Score: 3–6, 6–4, [10–3]

Events
Singles	Doubles
Oeiras Ladies Open	· 2022 →

This was the first edition of the tournament.

Lidziya Marozava and Andreea Mitu won the title, defeating Marina Melnikova and Conny Perrin in the final, 3–6, 6–4, [10–3].

== Seeds ==
1. (Belarus) Lidziya Marozava / (Romania) Andreea Mitu (champions)
2. (Spain) Georgina García Pérez / (Luxembourg) Mandy Minella (quarterfinals)
3. (Hungary) Réka Luca Jani / (Czech Republic) Renata Voráčová (first round)
4. (Georgia (country)) Sofia Shapatava / (United Kingdom) Emily Webley-Smith (quarterfinals)

== Draw ==
=== Key ===
- Q = Qualifier
- WC = Wild card
- LL = Lucky loser
- Alt = Alternate
- SE = Special exempt
- PR = Protected ranking
- ITF = ITF entry
- JE = Junior exempt
- w/o = Walkover
- r = Retired
- d = Defaulted
- SR = Special ranking

=== Draw ===
First round
1	(Belarus) L Marozava (Romania) A Mitu	6	7
Alt	(France) C Paquet (France) D Parry	2	5
(United Kingdom) E Silva (Belgium) K Zimmermann	6	6
(Russia) S Lansere (Bulgaria) I Shinikova	3	2
3	(Hungary) RL Jani (Czech Republic) R Voráčová	7	1	[7]
(Russia) N Dzalamidze (Greece) V Grammatikopoulou	5	6	[10]
(Ukraine) A Kalinina (Slovakia) R Šramková
WC	(Ukraine) E Hamaliy (Portugal) AF Santos	w/o
WC	(Portugal) F Jorge (Portugal) I Murta	3	6	[9]
(Russia) M Melnikova (Switzerland) C Perrin	6	3	[11]
WC	(Portugal) M Jorge (Portugal) M Santos	2	2
4	(Georgia (country)) S Shapatava (United Kingdom) E Webley-Smith	6	6
(Serbia) N Kostić (Cyprus) R Șerban	2	5
(South Korea) J-h Choi (South Korea) N-l Han	6	7
(Spain) E Guerrero Álvarez (China) Jia Lu
2	(Spain) G García Pérez (Luxembourg) M Minella	w/o

Quarterfinals
1	(Belarus) L Marozava (Romania) A Mitu	6	7^{7}
(United Kingdom) E Silva (Belgium) K Zimmermann	4	6^{5}
(Russia) N Dzalamidze (Greece) V Grammatikopoulou	6	6
WC	(Ukraine) E Hamaliy (Portugal) AF Santos	2	1
(Russia) M Melnikova (Switzerland) C Perrin	7^{7}	6
4	(Georgia (country)) S Shapatava (United Kingdom) E Webley-Smith	6^{5}	1
(South Korea) J-h Choi (South Korea) N-l Han	7^{7}	6
2	(Spain) G García Pérez (Luxembourg) M Minella	6^{5}	4

Semifinals
1	(Belarus) L Marozava (Romania) A Mitu	7	6
(Russia) N Dzalamidze (Greece) V Grammatikopoulou	5	3
(Russia) M Melnikova (Switzerland) C Perrin	6	6
(South Korea) J-h Choi (South Korea) N-l Han	2	2

Final
1	(Belarus) L Marozava (Romania) A Mitu	3	6	[10]
(Russia) M Melnikova (Switzerland) C Perrin	6	4	[3]
