= 2026 Philly Open =

- Date: 24–29 August 2026
- Edition: 1st
- Category: WTA 125
- Prize money: $115,000
- Surface: Hard
- Location: Philadelphia, United States

Champions

Singles
- (United States) Katie Volynets

Doubles
- (Netherlands) Isabelle Haverlag / (Slovenia) Nika Radišić
- Philly Open

The 2026 Philly Open, also known as Ennoble Care Philly Open, for sponsorship reasons, was a professional women's tennis tournament to be played on outdoor hardcourts. It was the first edition of the tournament, as part of the 2026 WTA 125 tournaments, replacing Tennis in the Land in the main 250 tour-level WTA tournament. It took place at the Hamlin Tennis Center (University of Pennsylvania) in Philadelphia, United States between 24 and 29 August 2026.

== Singles main-draw entrants ==
=== Seeds ===
Country	Player	Rank^{1}	Seed
	~~Liudmila Samsonova~~	~~43~~	~~1~~
USA	Ashlyn Krueger	56	2
CZE	Tereza Valentová	64	3
AUS	Talia Gibson	65	4
SUI	Simona Waltert	87	5
USA	Katie Volynets	89	6
ESP	Jéssica Bouzas Maneiro	90	7
	Anastasia Zakharova	91	8
ESP	Oksana Selekhmeteva	99	9

- ^{1} Rankings are as of 10 August 2026.

=== Other entrants ===
The following players received wildcards into the singles main draw:

- (United States) Anna Frey
- (Austria) Julia Grabher
- (Peru) Lucciana Pérez Alarcón
- (United States) Sloane Stephens

The following players received entry from the qualifying draw:

- (Canada) Ariana Arseneault
- (United States) Jaeda Daniel
- Ekaterina Ovcharenko
- (Germany) Ella Seidel

The following player received entry as a lucky loser:

- (United States) Capucine Jauffret

=== Withdrawals ===
Before the tournament

- (United States) Kayla Day → replaced by (Japan) Ena Koike
- Alina Korneeva → replaced by (France) Loïs Boisson
- (United States) Claire Liu → replaced by (United States) Kylie Collins
- (Germany) Eva Lys → replaced by (Slovakia) Mia Pohánková
- Liudmila Samsonova → replaced by (United States) Capucine Jauffret
- Alexandra Shubladze → replaced by (China) Tian Fangran
- (Argentina) Solana Sierra → replaced by (Ecuador) Mell Reasco González
- (United States) Mary Stoiana → replaced by (United States) Fiona Crawley
- (Belgium) Hanne Vandewinkel → replaced by (Hong Kong) Cody Wong

== Doubles entrants ==
=== Seeds ===
Country	Player	Country	Player	Rank	Seed
CZE	Anastasia Dețiuc		Irina Khromacheva	103	1
CZE	Jesika Malečková	CZE	Miriam Škoch	107	2
HKG	Eudice Chong	CHN	Yang Zhaoxuan	121	3
NED	Isabelle Haverlag	SLO	Nika Radišić	141	4

- Rankings as of 17 August 2026.

=== Other entrants ===
The following pair received a wildcard into the doubles main draw:

- (Serbia) Lara Stojanovski / (United States) Esha Velaga

== Champions ==
=== Singles ===
- (United States) Katie Volynets def. (Czech Republic) Tereza Valentová 6–3, 7–5.

=== Doubles ===
- (Netherlands) Isabelle Haverlag / (Slovenia) Nika Radišić def. (Czech Republic) Jesika Malečková / (Czech Republic) Miriam Škoch 6–2, 1–6, [10–7].
