= 2022 Oeiras Ladies Open – Singles =

Singles
- 2022 Oeiras Ladies Open

Final
- Champion: (Italy) Elisabetta Cocciaretto
- Runner-up: (Bulgaria) Viktoriya Tomova
- Score: 7–6^{(7–5)}, 2–6, 7–5

Events
Singles	Doubles
← 2021 ·	Oeiras Ladies Open	· 2023 →

Polona Hercog was the defending champion but chose not to participate.

Elisabetta Cocciaretto won the title, defeating Viktoriya Tomova in the final, 7–6^{(7–5)}, 2–6, 7–5.

== Seeds ==
1. Varvara Gracheva (second round)
2. (France) Clara Burel (withdrew)
3. (France) Océane Dodin (withdrew)
4. (France) Diane Parry (second round)
5. (France) Kristina Mladenovic (first round, retired)
6. Vitalia Diatchenko (first round)
7. (France) Chloé Paquet (first round)
8. (Hungary) Dalma Gálfi (semifinals)

== Draw ==
=== Key ===
- Q = Qualifier
- WC = Wild card
- LL = Lucky loser
- Alt = Alternate
- SE = Special exempt
- PR = Protected ranking
- ITF = ITF entry
- JE = Junior exempt
- w/o = Walkover
- r = Retired
- d = Defaulted
- SR = Special ranking

=== Finals ===
Semifinals
Yuliya Hatouka	7	1	1
(Bulgaria) Viktoriya Tomova	5	6	6
Q	(Italy) Elisabetta Cocciaretto	6	6
8	(Hungary) Dalma Gálfi	3	3

Final
(Bulgaria) Viktoriya Tomova	6^{5}	6	5
Q	(Italy) Elisabetta Cocciaretto	7^{7}	2	7

=== Top half ===
First round
1	V Gracheva	6	3	6
(Spain) C Bucșa	1	6	3
Y Hatouka	6	6
(Poland) K Kawa	2	1
Q	(Italy) S Rubini	4	4
SE	(France) L Jeanjean	6	6
Q	(Romania) A Mitu	1	7^{7}	6
7	(France) C Paquet	6	6^{4}	3
LL	N Vikhlyantseva	6	6
Q	(Germany) N Schunk	2	3
WC	(Portugal) AF Santos	1	1
(France) F Ferro	6	6
(Austria) J Grabher	6	6^{5}	3
(Bulgaria) V Tomova	3	7^{7}	6
Q	(Germany) K Gerlach	6	7
6	V Diatchenko	0	5

Second round
1	V Gracheva	7	2	3
Y Hatouka	5	6	6
SE	(France) L Jeanjean	3	6	6^{8}
Q	(Romania) A Mitu	6	4	7^{10}
LL	N Vikhlyantseva	4	6	5
(France) F Ferro	6	4	7
(Bulgaria) V Tomova	6	7^{7}
Q	(Germany) K Gerlach	1	6^{3}

Quarterfinals
Y Hatouka	6	6
Q	(Romania) A Mitu	3	3
(France) F Ferro	2	1
(Bulgaria) V Tomova	6	6

Semifinals
Y Hatouka	7	1	1
(Bulgaria) V Tomova	5	6	6

=== Bottom half ===
First round
5	(France) K Mladenovic	4	0^{r}
(Germany) A-L Friedsam	6	0
Q	(Italy) E Cocciaretto	5	6	6
Q	(Brazil) I Gamarra Martins	7	4	2
Q	(United States) A Lahey	2	4
WC	(Serbia) N Stevanović	6	6
WC	(Portugal) M Jorge	6	1	5
4	(France) D Parry	3	6	7
8	(Hungary) D Gálfi	7^{11}	6
Q	(Lithuania) J Mikulskytė	6^{9}	0
JE	(Croatia) P Marčinko	6	6
(China) L Zhu	3	3
LL	(Spain) J Bouzas Maneiro	4	6	3
A Blinkova	6	3	6
WC	(Portugal) F Jorge	6	7^{7}
LL	(United Kingdom) A Barnett	1	6^{5}

Second round
(Germany) A-L Friedsam	1	6	5
Q	(Italy) E Cocciaretto	6	2	7
WC	(Serbia) N Stevanović	6	6
4	(France) D Parry	3	4
8	(Hungary) D Gálfi	6	4	6
JE	(Croatia) P Marčinko	0	6	4
A Blinkova	6	6
WC	(Portugal) F Jorge	2	2

Quarterfinals
Q	(Italy) E Cocciaretto	6	6
WC	(Serbia) N Stevanović	3	3
8	(Hungary) D Gálfi	7^{9}	6
A Blinkova	6^{7}	4

Semifinals
Q	(Italy) E Cocciaretto	6	6
8	(Hungary) D Gálfi	3	3
