= 2018 ITF Women's Circuit – Baotou – Doubles =

Baotou – Doubles
- 2018 ITF Women's Circuit – Baotou

Final
- Champions: (Australia) Alison Bai (Bulgaria) Aleksandrina Naydenova
- Runners-up: (Serbia) Natalija Kostić (Russia) Nika Kukharchuk
- Score: 6–4, 0–6, [10–6]

Events
Singles	Doubles
ITF Women's Circuit – Baotou	· 2019 →

This was the first edition of the tournament.

Alison Bai and Aleksandrina Naydenova won the title, defeating Natalija Kostić and Nika Kukharchuk in the final, 6–4, 0–6, [10–6].

== Seeds ==
1. (China) Jiang Xinyu / (China) Xun Fangying (first round)
2. (Australia) Alison Bai / (Bulgaria) Aleksandrina Naydenova (champions)
3. (Japan) Hiroko Kuwata / (Australia) Olivia Tjandramulia (quarterfinals)
4. (China) Ye Qiuyu / (China) Zheng Wushuang (semifinals)

== Draw ==
=== Key ===
- Q = Qualifier
- WC = Wild card
- LL = Lucky loser
- Alt = Alternate
- SE = Special exempt
- PR = Protected ranking
- ITF = ITF entry
- JE = Junior exempt
- w/o = Walkover
- r = Retired
- d = Defaulted
- SR = Special ranking

=== Draw ===
First round
1	(China) X Jiang (China) F Xun	6	2	[7]
(China) X Sun (China) Q Zhao	3	6	[10]
(China) S Feng (China) J Kang	6	4	[4]
(Serbia) N Kostić (Russia) N Kukharchuk	3	6	[10]
4	(China) Q Ye (China) W Zheng	6	6
WC	(China) S Cao (China) S Ma	4	2
(India) R Bhosale (China) X You	6	3	[10]
(Japan) M Minokoshi (Japan) E Sema	2	6	[4]
(China) Yu Zhang (China) L Zhu	1	6	[7]
(Romania) AA Roșca (China) S Xu	6	2	[10]
WC	(China) J He (China) D Wang	3	4
3	(Japan) H Kuwata (Australia) O Tjandramulia	6	6
(China) J Chen (China) Yi Zhang	3	6	[12]
(Hong Kong) K-y Ng (United Kingdom) E Webley-Smith	6	0	[10]
WC	(China) S Guo (China) Z Sun	4	6^{5}
2	(Australia) A Bai (Bulgaria) A Naydenova	6	7^{7}

Quarterfinals
(China) X Sun (China) Q Zhao	0	3
(Serbia) N Kostić (Russia) N Kukharchuk	6	6
4	(China) Q Ye (China) W Zheng	1	6	[10]
(India) R Bhosale (China) X You	6	0	[7]
(Romania) AA Roșca (China) S Xu	6	6
3	(Japan) H Kuwata (Australia) O Tjandramulia	1	1
(China) J Chen (China) Yi Zhang	4	6^{6}
2	(Australia) A Bai (Bulgaria) A Naydenova	6	7^{8}

Semifinals
(Serbia) N Kostić (Russia) N Kukharchuk	6	7^{7}
4	(China) Q Ye (China) W Zheng	3	6^{2}
(Romania) AA Roșca (China) S Xu	5	2
2	(Australia) A Bai (Bulgaria) A Naydenova	7	6

Final
(Serbia) N Kostić (Russia) N Kukharchuk	4	6	[6]
2	(Australia) A Bai (Bulgaria) A Naydenova	6	0	[10]
