= 2025 Oeiras Ladies Open =

- Date: 14–20 April
- Edition: 5th
- Category: WTA 125
- Prize money: €173,913
- Surface: Clay / Outdoor
- Location: Oeiras, Portugal

Champions

Singles
- (Hungary) Dalma Gálfi

Doubles
- (Portugal) Francisca Jorge / (Portugal) Matilde Jorge
- Oeiras Ladies Open

The 2025 Oeiras Ladies Open was a professional women's tennis tournament played on outdoor clay courts. It was the fifth edition of the tournament and part of the 2025 WTA 125 tournaments. It took place at the Centro Desportivo Nacional do Jamor in Oeiras, Portugal, between 14 and 20 April 2025.

== Singles entrants ==
=== Seeds ===
Country	Player	Rank	Seed
PHI	Alexandra Eala	73	1
USA	Katie Volynets	80	2
ITA	Elisabetta Cocciaretto	89	3
HUN	Anna Bondár	91	4
CHN	Yuan Yue	101	5
~~ROU~~	~~Sorana Cîrstea~~	~~117~~	~~6~~
~~ARG~~	~~Solana Sierra~~	~~119~~	~~7~~
POL	Maja Chwalińska	121	8

- Rankings are as of 7 April 2025.

=== Other entrants ===
The following players received wildcards into the singles main draw:

- (Portugal) Francisca Jorge
- (Portugal) Matilde Jorge
- (Portugal) Inês Murta
- (Portugal) Angelina Voloshchuk

The following players received entry from the qualifying draw:

- Alevtina Ibragimova
- (Czech Republic) Jesika Malečková
- (Germany) Noma Noha Akugue
- (Netherlands) Lian Tran

The following players received entry as lucky losers:

- (Canada) Carson Branstine
- (Romania) Patricia Maria Țig

=== Withdrawals ===
- (Romania) Sorana Cîrstea → replaced by (Romania) Patricia Maria Țig
- (Argentina) Solana Sierra → replaced by (Canada) Carson Branstine

== Doubles entrants ==
=== Seeds ===
Country	Player	Country	Player	Rank^{1}	Seed
	Amina Anshba		Elena Pridankina	176	1
POR	Francisca Jorge	POR	Matilde Jorge	205	2
CZE	Jesika Malečková	CZE	Miriam Škoch	208	3
USA	Carmen Corley	USA	Christina Rosca	292	4

- ^{1} Rankings as of 7 April 2025.

=== Other entrants ===
The following team received a wildcard into the doubles main draw:

- (Portugal) Inês Murta / (Portugal) Angelina Voloshchuk

== Champions ==
=== Singles ===
- (Hungary) Dalma Gálfi def. (United States) Katie Volynets, 4–6, 6–1, 6–2

=== Doubles ===
- (Portugal) Francisca Jorge / (Portugal) Matilde Jorge def. (Czech Republic) Anastasia Dețiuc / (Romania) Patricia Maria Țig, 6–1, 6–2
