= 2026 Philly Open – Singles =

Singles
- 2026 Philly Open

Final
- Champion: (United States) Katie Volynets
- Runner-up: (Czech Republic) Tereza Valentová
- Score: 6–3, 7–5

Details
- Draw: 32 (4Q / 4WC)
- Seeds: 8

Events
Singles	Doubles
- Philly Open

This was the first edition of the tournament.

Katie Volynets won the title, defeating Tereza Valentová 6–3, 7–5 in the final.

== Seeds ==
1. Liudmila Samsonova (withdrew)
2. (United States) Ashlyn Krueger (second round)
3. (Czech Republic) Tereza Valentová (final)
4. (Australia) Talia Gibson (first round)
5. (Switzerland) Simona Waltert (first round)
6. (United States) Katie Volynets (champion)
7. (Spain) Jéssica Bouzas Maneiro (second round)
8. Anastasia Zakharova (second round)
9. (Spain) Oksana Selekhmeteva (semifinals)

== Draw ==
Key

- Q = Qualifier
- WC = Wild card
- LL = Lucky loser
- Alt = Alternate
- ITF = ITF entry
- PR = Protected ranking
- SR = Special ranking
- SE = Special exempt
- JE = Junior exempt
- JR = Junior Accelerator Programme entrant
- CO = College Accelerator Programme entrant
- NG = Next Gen Accelerator Program entrant
- w/o = Walkover
- r = Retired
- d = Defaulted

=== Finals ===
Semifinals
9	(Spain) Oksana Selekhmeteva	3	6^{6}
6	(United States) Katie Volynets	6	7^{8}
3	(Czech Republic) Tereza Valentová	6	6
WC	(Austria) Julia Grabher	3	1

Final
6	(United States) Katie Volynets	6	7
3	(Czech Republic) Tereza Valentová	3	5

=== Top half ===
First round
9	(Spain) O Selekhmeteva	3	6	6
(Australia) T Preston	6	3	1
(France) L Boisson	1	0^{r}
LL	(United States) C Jauffret	6	0
(China) Xiy Wang	6	6
(Japan) E Koike	2	2
Q	(Germany) E Seidel	4	2
7	(Spain) J Bouzas Maneiro	6	6
4	(Australia) T Gibson	5	7^{7}	4
(Australia) L Cabrera	7	6^{5}	6
(Thailand) M Sawangkaew	4	6	6
WC	(United States) S Stephens	6	2	2
(Slovakia) M Pohánková	6	6
(Ecuador) M Reasco González	3	3
(Hong Kong) C Wong	2	1
6	(United States) K Volynets	6	6

Second round
9	(Spain) O Selekhmeteva	4	7^{7}	6
LL	(United States) C Jauffret	6	6^{4}	3
(China) Xiy Wang	4	6	6
7	(Spain) J Bouzas Maneiro	6	4	2
(Australia) L Cabrera	2	6^{6}
(Thailand) M Sawangkaew	6	7^{8}
(Slovakia) M Pohánková	1	1
6	(United States) K Volynets	6	6

Quarterfinals
9	(Spain) O Selekhmeteva	w/o
(China) Xiy Wang
(Thailand) M Sawangkaew	2	3
6	(United States) K Volynets	6	6

Semifinals
9	(Spain) O Selekhmeteva	3	6^{6}
6	(United States) K Volynets	6	7^{8}

=== Bottom half ===
First round
8	A Zakharova	7^{8}	6
A Blinkova	6^{6}	0
Q	(United States) J Daniel	0	2
(United States) K Collins	6	6
(China) F Tian	5	6	6
WC	(Peru) L Pérez Alarcón	7	3	1
Q	(Canada) A Arseneault	6^{6}	1
3	(Czech Republic) T Valentová	7^{8}	6
5	(Switzerland) S Waltert	5	3
(United States) F Crawley	7	6
Q	E Ovcharenko	6	0	7^{7}
(Spain) K Quevedo	1	6	6^{5}
(Slovenia) V Erjavec	6^{5}	6	6^{3}
WC	(Austria) J Grabher	7^{7}	3	7^{7}
WC	(United States) A Frey	1	4
2	(United States) A Krueger	6	6

Second round
8	A Zakharova	4	3
(United States) K Collins	6	6
(China) F Tian	3	1
3	(Czech Republic) T Valentová	6	6
(United States) F Crawley	6	6
Q	E Ovcharenko	4	3
WC	(Austria) J Grabher	6	6
2	(United States) A Krueger	4	4

Quarterfinals
(United States) K Collins	1	2
3	(Czech Republic) T Valentová	6	6
(United States) F Crawley	4	3
WC	(Austria) J Grabher	6	6

Semifinals
3	(Czech Republic) T Valentová	6	6
WC	(Austria) J Grabher	3	1

== Qualifying ==
=== Seeds ===
1. (Germany) Ella Seidel (qualified)
2. (Canada) Ariana Arseneault (qualified)
3. Ekaterina Ovcharenko (qualified)
4. (United States) Jaeda Daniel (qualified)

=== Qualifiers ===
1. (Germany) Ella Seidel
2. (Canada) Ariana Arseneault
3. Ekaterina Ovcharenko
4. (United States) Jaeda Daniel

=== Lucky loser ===
1. (United States) Capucine Jauffret

=== Qualifying draw ===
==== First qualifier ====
Qualifying competition
1	(Germany) Ella Seidel	7	6
WC	(United States) Capucine Jauffret	5	3

==== Second qualifier ====
Qualifying competition
2	(Canada) Ariana Arseneault	7	6
	(Australia) Alexandra Osborne	5	3

==== Third qualifier ====
Qualifying competition
3	Ekaterina Ovcharenko	6	6
WC	(United States) Esha Velaga	2	4

==== Fourth qualifier ====
Qualifying competition
4	(United States) Jaeda Daniel	6	6
	(China) Dang Yiming	4	1
