= 2024 Oeiras Ladies Open – Doubles =

Doubles
- 2024 Oeiras Ladies Open

Final
- Champions: (Portugal) Francisca Jorge (Portugal) Matilde Jorge
- Runners-up: (United Kingdom) Harriet Dart (France) Kristina Mladenovic
- Score: 6–0, 6–4

Events
Singles	Doubles
← 2023 ·	Oeiras Ladies Open	· 2025 →

Ulrikke Eikeri and Eri Hozumi were the defending champions but Eikeri chose to compete in Stuttgart, whilst Hozumi chose not to participate.

Francisca and Matilde Jorge won the title, defeating Harriet Dart and Kristina Mladenovic in the final, 6–0, 6–4.

== Seeds ==
1. (Czech Republic) Miriam Kolodziejová / (Czech Republic) Anna Sisková (semifinals)
2. (United Kingdom) Harriet Dart / (France) Kristina Mladenovic (final)
3. (Thailand) Luksika Kumkhum / (Thailand) Peangtarn Plipuech (semifinals)
4. (United Kingdom) Alicia Barnett / (United Kingdom) Freya Christie (first round)

== Draw ==
=== Key ===
- Q = Qualifier
- WC = Wild card
- LL = Lucky loser
- Alt = Alternate
- SE = Special exempt
- PR = Protected ranking
- ITF = ITF entry
- JE = Junior exempt
- w/o = Walkover
- r = Retired
- d = Defaulted
- SR = Special ranking

First round
1	(Czech Republic) M Kolodziejová (Czech Republic) A Sisková	6	6
(Ukraine) M Kolb (Ukraine) N Kolb	1	2
WC	(Portugal) M Garcia (Portugal) AF Santos	2	2
(Georgia (country)) N Dzalamidze (Mexico) R Zarazúa	6	6
4	(United Kingdom) A Barnett (United Kingdom) F Christie	3	0
(Portugal) F Jorge (Portugal) M Jorge	6	6
(Czech Republic) M Bayerlová (Italy) N Fossa Huergo	7	2	[3]
(Netherlands) I Haverlag (Netherlands) S Lamens	5	6	[10]
(United States) C Corley (United States) I Corley	6	6
(France) E Cascino (Kazakhstan) Z Kulambayeva	4	1
(Czech Republic) G Knutson (Canada) K Sebov	6^{3}	2
3	(Thailand) L Kumkhum (Thailand) P Plipuech	7^{7}	6
Alt	A Falei (United States) V Lepchenko	6	6
(Philippines) A Eala (Australia) T Preston	4	4
(Switzerland) C Perrin (United Kingdom) E Silva	4	3
2	(United Kingdom) H Dart (France) K Mladenovic	6	6

Quarterfinals
1	(Czech Republic) M Kolodziejová (Czech Republic) A Sisková	6	6
(Georgia (country)) N Dzalamidze (Mexico) R Zarazúa	4	1
(Portugal) F Jorge (Portugal) M Jorge	6	6
(Netherlands) I Haverlag (Netherlands) S Lamens	3	4
(United States) C Corley (United States) I Corley	3	3
3	(Thailand) L Kumkhum (Thailand) P Plipuech	6	6
Alt	A Falei (United States) V Lepchenko	1	4
2	(United Kingdom) H Dart (France) K Mladenovic	6	6

Semifinals
1	(Czech Republic) M Kolodziejová (Czech Republic) A Sisková	3	3
(Portugal) F Jorge (Portugal) M Jorge	6	6
3	(Thailand) L Kumkhum (Thailand) P Plipuech	6^{3}	5
2	(United Kingdom) H Dart (France) K Mladenovic	7^{7}	7

Final
(Portugal) F Jorge (Portugal) M Jorge	6	6
2	(United Kingdom) H Dart (France) K Mladenovic	0	4
