= 2023 Oeiras Ladies Open – Doubles =

Doubles
- 2023 Oeiras Ladies Open

Final
- Champions: (Norway) Ulrikke Eikeri (Japan) Eri Hozumi
- Runners-up: (Portugal) Francisca Jorge (Portugal) Matilde Jorge
- Score: 4–6, 6–4, [10–5]

Events
Singles	Doubles
← 2022 ·	Oeiras Ladies Open	· 2024 →

Katarzyna Piter and Kimberley Zimmermann were the defending champions but Zimmermann chose not to participate. Piter partnered alongside Bibiane Schoofs but lost to Francisca and Matilde Jorge in the quarterfinals.

Ulrikke Eikeri and Eri Hozumi won the title, defeating Francisca and Matilde Jorge in the final, 4–6, 6–4, [10–5].

== Seeds ==
1. (Norway) Ulrikke Eikeri / (Japan) Eri Hozumi (champions)
2. (Georgia (country)) Natela Dzalamidze / Lidziya Marozava (first round)
3. (United Kingdom) Alicia Barnett / (United Kingdom) Olivia Nicholls (semifinals)
4. (Mexico) Fernanda Contreras / (United States) Asia Muhammad (first round)

== Draw ==
=== Key ===
- Q = Qualifier
- WC = Wild card
- LL = Lucky loser
- Alt = Alternate
- SE = Special exempt
- PR = Protected ranking
- ITF = ITF entry
- JE = Junior exempt
- w/o = Walkover
- r = Retired
- d = Defaulted
- SR = Special ranking

First round
1	(Norway) U Eikeri (Japan) E Hozumi	6^{3}	7	[10]
(Czech Republic) A Dețiuc (Czech Republic) J Malečková	7^{7}	5	[4]
WC	(Portugal) M Garcia (Portugal) A Voloshchuk	1	1
(Hungary) A Bondár (Czech Republic) M Bouzková	6	6
3	(United Kingdom) A Barnett (United Kingdom) O Nicholls	4	6	[10]
WC	(Spain) L Cortez Llorca (Portugal) I Murta	6	1	[6]
(Uzbekistan) N Abduraimova (Japan) M Uchijima	6	6
(Romania) IL Roșca (Bosnia and Herzegovina) A Wagner	2	4
WC	(Portugal) E Hamaliy (Portugal) S Lança	1	1
(Poland) K Piter (Netherlands) B Schoofs	6	6
(Portugal) F Jorge (Portugal) M Jorge	4	6	[12]
4	(Mexico) F Contreras (United States) A Muhammad	6	4	[10]
(Brazil) I Gamarra Martins (Lithuania) J Mikulskytė	5	6	[10]
(France) D Parry; E Yashina	7	4	[5]
(France) A Hesse (France) K Mladenovic	6	6^{3}	[10]
2	(Georgia (country)) N Dzalamidze; L Marozava	4	7^{7}	[3]

Quarterfinals
1	(Norway) U Eikeri (Japan) E Hozumi	7	4	[11]
(Hungary) A Bondár (Czech Republic) M Bouzková	5	6	[9]
3	(United Kingdom) A Barnett (United Kingdom) O Nicholls	7	6
(Uzbekistan) N Abduraimova (Japan) M Uchijima	5	1
(Poland) K Piter (Netherlands) B Schoofs	2	3
(Portugal) F Jorge (Portugal) M Jorge	6	6
(Brazil) I Gamarra Martins (Lithuania) J Mikulskytė	7^{7}	6
(France) A Hesse (France) K Mladenovic	6^{4}	4

Semifinals
1	(Norway) U Eikeri (Japan) E Hozumi	6	6
3	(United Kingdom) A Barnett (United Kingdom) O Nicholls	2	1
(Portugal) F Jorge (Portugal) M Jorge	6	6
(Brazil) I Gamarra Martins (Lithuania) J Mikulskytė	1	3

Final
1	(Norway) U Eikeri (Japan) E Hozumi	4	6	[10]
(Portugal) F Jorge (Portugal) M Jorge	6	4	[5]
