= ITF Women's Circuit – Baotou =

- 2018 ITF Women's Circuit – Baotou

ITF Women's Tour
- Event name: Baotou
- Location: Baotou, China
- Venue: Baotou Olympic Park Tennis Center
- Category: ITF $60,000
- Surface: Clay / Indoor
- Prize money: $60,000

The ITF Women's Circuit – Baotou is a tennis tournament held on indoor clay courts at Baotou Olympic Park Tennis Center in Baotou, China. It has been held since 2018 and is part of the ITF Women's Circuit as a $60,000 event.

== Past finals ==
=== Singles ===
Year	Champion	Runner-up	Score
2026	(China) Wang Xiyu	Anastasia Zolotareva	6–2, 6–3
2019–25	Not held		
2018	(Serbia) Nina Stojanović	(China) Xu Shilin	6–0, 6–4

=== Doubles ===
Year	Champions	Runners-up	Score
2026	(Kazakhstan) Zhibek Kulambayeva; Ekaterina Reyngold	(Italy) Diletta Cherubini (China) Yuan Chengyiyi	6–4, 0–6, [10–6]
2019–25	Not held		
2018	(Australia) Alison Bai (Bulgaria) Aleksandrina Naydenova	(Serbia) Natalija Kostić (Russia) Nika Kukharchuk	6–4, 0–6, [10–6]
