= 2026 Philly Open – Doubles =

Doubles
- 2026 Philly Open

Final
- Champions: (Netherlands) Isabelle Haverlag (Slovenia) Nika Radišić
- Runners-up: (Czech Republic) Jesika Malečková (Czech Republic) Miriam Škoch
- Score: 6–2, 1–6, [10–7]

Details
- Draw: 32 (4Q / 4WC)
- Seeds: 8

Events
Singles	Doubles
- Philly Open

This was the first edition of the tournament.

Isabelle Haverlag and Nika Radišić won the title, defeating Jesika Malečková and Miriam Škoch 6–2, 1–6, [10–7] in the final.

== Seeds ==
1. (Czech Republic) Anastasia Dețiuc / Irina Khromacheva (quarterfinals)
2. (Czech Republic) Jesika Malečková / (Czech Republic) Miriam Škoch (final)
3. (Hong Kong) Eudice Chong / (China) Yang Zhaoxuan (semifinals)
4. (Netherlands) Isabelle Haverlag / (Slovenia) Nika Radišić (champions)

== Draw ==
Key

- Q = Qualifier
- WC = Wild card
- LL = Lucky loser
- Alt = Alternate
- ITF = ITF entry
- PR = Protected ranking
- SR = Special ranking
- SE = Special exempt
- JE = Junior exempt
- JR = Junior Accelerator Programme entrant
- CO = College Accelerator Programme entrant
- NG = Next Gen Accelerator Program entrant
- w/o = Walkover
- r = Retired
- d = Defaulted

=== Draw ===
First round
1	(Czech Republic) A Dețiuc; I Khromacheva	7	6
(Australia) A Osborne (Hong Kong) C Wong	5	0
(Japan) E Hozumi (Brazil) I Martins	6	4	[10]
(United States) C Harrison (United States) D Hewitt	2	6	[3]
4	(Netherlands) I Haverlag (Slovenia) N Radišić	6	3	[10]
(Mexico) M Gómez Pezuela Cano (Ecuador) M Reasco González	0	6	[5]
(Australia) L Cabrera (China) Y Dang	2	6	[5]
(United States) A Rencheli (United States) A Smith	6	3	[10]
(United States) C Corley (United States) I Corley	6	3	[10]
(Ukraine) A Sahdiieva (China) F Tian	3	6	[12]
(United States) F Crawley (United States) J Daniel	6^{6}	0
3	(Hong Kong) E Chong (China) Z Yang	7^{8}	6
(United States) A Rogers (United States) A Zamarripa	6	6
(Canada) A Arseneault (Canada) R Lacasse	4	2
WC	(Serbia) L Stojanovski (United States) E Velaga	4	2
2	(Czech Republic) J Malečková (Czech Republic) M Škoch	6	6

Quarterfinals
1	(Czech Republic) A Dețiuc; I Khromacheva	2	3
(Japan) E Hozumi (Brazil) I Martins	6	6
4	(Netherlands) I Haverlag (Slovenia) N Radišić	6	6
(United States) A Rencheli (United States) A Smith	4	3
(Ukraine) A Sahdiieva (China) F Tian	7^{10}	0	[3]
3	(Hong Kong) E Chong (China) Z Yang	6^{8}	6	[10]
(United States) A Rogers (United States) A Zamarripa	3	1
2	(Czech Republic) J Malečková (Czech Republic) M Škoch	6	6

Semifinals
(Japan) E Hozumi (Brazil) I Martins	2	1
4	(Netherlands) I Haverlag (Slovenia) N Radišić	6	6
3	(Hong Kong) E Chong (China) Z Yang	2	6	[3]
2	(Czech Republic) J Malečková (Czech Republic) M Škoch	6	0	[10]

Final
4	(Netherlands) I Haverlag (Slovenia) N Radišić	6	1	[10]
2	(Czech Republic) J Malečková (Czech Republic) M Škoch	2	6	[7]
