= 2023 Oeiras Ladies Open – Singles =

Singles
- 2023 Oeiras Ladies Open

Final
- Champion: (Montenegro) Danka Kovinić
- Runner-up: (Spain) Rebeka Masarova
- Score: 6–2, 6–2

Events
Singles	Doubles
← 2022 ·	Oeiras Ladies Open	· 2024 →

Elisabetta Cocciaretto was the defending champion but chose not to participate.

Danka Kovinić won the title, defeating Rebeka Masarova in the final, 6–2, 6–2.

== Seeds ==
1. (Czech Republic) Marie Bouzková (quarterfinals)
2. (Czech Republic) Linda Nosková (first round, retired)
3. (Egypt) Mayar Sherif (semifinals)
4. Anna Blinkova (second round)
5. (Montenegro) Danka Kovinić (champion)
6. (Spain) Nuria Párrizas Díaz (second round)
7. (Italy) Sara Errani (second round)
8. (Hungary) Anna Bondár (first round)

== Draw ==
=== Key ===
- Q = Qualifier
- WC = Wild card
- LL = Lucky loser
- Alt = Alternate
- SE = Special exempt
- PR = Protected ranking
- ITF = ITF entry
- JE = Junior exempt
- w/o = Walkover
- r = Retired
- d = Defaulted
- SR = Special ranking

=== Finals ===
Semifinals
5	(Montenegro) Danka Kovinić	0	6	6
(Spain) Sara Sorribes Tormo	6	3	2
3	(Egypt) Mayar Sherif	4	5
(Spain) Rebeka Masarova	6	7

Final
5	(Montenegro) Danka Kovinić	6	6
(Spain) Rebeka Masarova	2	2

=== Top half ===
First round
1	(Czech Republic) M Bouzková	6	6
(Portugal) F Jorge	3	2
Q	(South Africa) I Kruger	6	6
Q	(Malta) F Curmi	1	1
(France) D Parry	2	4
WC	(Canada) E Bouchard	6	6
(France) O Dodin	5	2
5	(Montenegro) D Kovinić	7	6
4	A Blinkova	6	6
SR	(France) A Hesse	2	2
(Mexico) F Contreras	2	2
E Andreeva	6	6
Q	(Germany) L Meyer auf der Heide	0	0
(Spain) S Sorribes Tormo	6	6
WC	(Portugal) M Jorge	2	2
6/Q	(Spain) N Párrizas Díaz	6	6

Second round
1	(Czech Republic) M Bouzková	6	6
Q	(South Africa) I Kruger	0	3
WC	(Canada) E Bouchard	3	5
5	(Montenegro) D Kovinić	6	7
4	A Blinkova	2	6^{2}
E Andreeva	6	7^{7}
(Spain) S Sorribes Tormo	6	6
6/Q	(Spain) N Párrizas Díaz	1	4

Quarterfinals
1	(Czech Republic) M Bouzková	3	4
5	(Montenegro) D Kovinić	6	6
E Andreeva	1	3
(Spain) S Sorribes Tormo	6	6

Semifinals
5	(Montenegro) D Kovinić	0	6	6
(Spain) S Sorribes Tormo	6	3	2

=== Bottom half ===
First round
8	(Hungary) A Bondár	6	6^{5}	4
(Japan) M Uchijima	1	7^{7}	6
Q	(Bosnia and Herzegovina) N Berberović	6	7
Q	(Lithuania) J Mikulskytė	3	5
Q	(Czech Republic) J Malečková	6	5	7
(France) K Mladenovic	4	7	5
(United States) A Muhammad	4	1
3	(Egypt) M Sherif	6	6
7	(Italy) S Errani	6	7
(Australia) O Gadecki	3	5
(Spain) R Masarova	6	3	6
LL	(Spain) L Cortez Llorca	0	6	2
(Denmark) C Tauson	2	7^{7}	6
WC	(Ukraine) E Svitolina	6	6^{3}	4
Q	(France) M Rouvroy	6	2
2	(Czech Republic) L Nosková	2	0^{r}

Second round
(Japan) M Uchijima	7^{7}	4	6
Q	(Bosnia and Herzegovina) N Berberović	6^{4}	6	2
Q	(Czech Republic) J Malečková	2	2
3	(Egypt) M Sherif	6	6
7	(Italy) S Errani	6^{5}	4
(Spain) R Masarova	7^{7}	6
(Denmark) C Tauson	7^{7}	5	7
Q	(France) M Rouvroy	6^{5}	7	5

Quarterfinals
(Japan) M Uchijima	1	7^{9}	2
3	(Egypt) M Sherif	6	6^{7}	6
(Spain) R Masarova	6	6
(Denmark) C Tauson	2	1

Semifinals
3	(Egypt) M Sherif	4	5
(Spain) R Masarova	6	7
