= Philadelphia Tennis Classic =

- 2026 Philly Open

WTA 125
- Event name: Ennoble Care Philly Open
- Location: Philadelphia, United States
- Venue: Hamlin Tennis Center
- Category: WTA 125
- Surface: Hard
- Draw: 32S/8Q/16D
- Prize money: $115,000
- Website: Website

Current champions (2026)
- Singles: (United States) Katie Volynets
- Doubles: (Netherlands) Isabelle Haverlag (Slovenia) Nika Radišić

The Philadelphia Tennis Classic is a tournament for professional female tennis players played on outdoor hard courts. The event is classified as a WTA 125 tournament and is held at the Hamlin Tennis Center at the University of Pennsylvania in Philadelphia, United States. The tournament was introduced in 2026 after the cancellation of WTA 250 Tennis in the Land in Cleveland.

== Past finals ==
=== Singles ===
Year	Champion	Runners-up	Score
2026	(United States) Katie Volynets	(Czech Republic) Tereza Valentová	6–3, 7–5

=== Doubles ===
Year	Champions	Runners-up	Score
2026	(Netherlands) Isabelle Haverlag (Slovenia) Nika Radišić	(Czech Republic) Jesika Malečková (Czech Republic) Miriam Škoch	6–2, 1–6, [10–7]
