= 2024 Oeiras Ladies Open – Singles =

Singles
- 2024 Oeiras Ladies Open

Final
- Champion: (Netherlands) Suzan Lamens
- Runner-up: (Denmark) Clara Tauson
- Score: 6–4, 5–7, 6–4

Events
Singles	Doubles
← 2023 ·	Oeiras Ladies Open	· 2025 →

Suzan Lamens won the singles title at the 2024 Oeiras Ladies Open, defeating Clara Tauson in the final, 6–4, 5–7, 6–4.

Danka Kovinić was the reigning champion but chose not to participate.

== Seeds ==
1. (United States) Bernarda Pera (semifinals, withdrew)
2. (Spain) Rebeka Masarova (first round)
3. (Argentina) María Lourdes Carlé (withdrew)
4. (Denmark) Clara Tauson (final)
5. (United Kingdom) Harriet Dart (second round)
6. (China) Bai Zhuoxuan (second round)
7. (Mexico) Renata Zarazúa (second round)
8. (Slovakia) Rebecca Šramková (first round)
9. (Colombia) Emiliana Arango (first round)

== Draw ==
=== Key ===
- Q = Qualifier
- WC = Wild card
- LL = Lucky loser
- Alt = Alternate
- SE = Special exempt
- PR = Protected ranking
- ITF = ITF entry
- JE = Junior exempt
- w/o = Walkover
- r = Retired
- d = Defaulted
- SR = Special ranking

=== Finals ===
Semifinals
1	(United States) Bernarda Pera
4	(Denmark) Clara Tauson	w/o
(Netherlands) Suzan Lamens	4	6	6
WC	(France) Kristina Mladenovic	6	0	0

Final
4	(Denmark) Clara Tauson	4	7	4
(Netherlands) Suzan Lamens	6	5	6

=== Top half ===
First round
1	(United States) B Pera	1
(Australia) A Sharma	2^{r}
Q	(Netherlands) A Koevermans	1	4
Q	(Croatia) T Lukas	6	6
(Portugal) F Jorge	3	6	6
A Zakharova	6	1	4
(United States) A Parks	0	2
7	(Mexico) R Zarazúa	6	6
4	(Denmark) C Tauson	6	6
(France) C Monnet	3	1
Q	(United States) M Mateas	3	6	3
(Spain) N Párrizas Díaz	6	4	6
WC	(Portugal) M Jorge	6	7
WC	(Portugal) AF Santos	2	5
WC	(Portugal) M Garcia	2	4
5	(United Kingdom) H Dart	6	6

Second round
1	(United States) B Pera	3	6	6
Q	(Croatia) T Lukas	6	1	3
(Portugal) F Jorge	6	7
7	(Mexico) R Zarazúa	3	5
4	(Denmark) C Tauson	6	6
(Spain) N Párrizas Díaz	3	4
WC	(Portugal) M Jorge	6	6
5	(United Kingdom) H Dart	3	1

Quarterfinals
1	(United States) B Pera	6	6
(Portugal) F Jorge	4	1
4	(Denmark) C Tauson	6	6
WC	(Portugal) M Jorge	1	3

Semifinals
1	(United States) B Pera
4	(Denmark) C Tauson	w/o

=== Bottom half ===
First round
6	(China) Z Bai	7^{8}	7
(Italy) L Stefanini	6^{6}	5
A Falei	6	6
(Australia) T Preston	4	2
LL	J Avdeeva	2	6	6
(Philippines) A Eala	6	4	4
(Netherlands) S Lamens	7	6
9	(Colombia) E Arango	5	2
8	(Slovakia) R Šramková	6^{5}	5
LL	(United States) V Lepchenko	7^{7}	7
(Austria) S Kraus	7^{9}	6
(Czech Republic) G Knutson	6^{7}	1
LL	(Canada) K Sebov	4	2
WC	(France) K Mladenovic	6	6
(United Kingdom) F Jones	7^{7}	2	6
2	(Spain) R Masarova	6^{5}	6	1

Second round
6	(China) Z Bai	4	4
A Falei	6	6
LL	J Avdeeva	5	0
(Netherlands) S Lamens	7	6
LL	(United States) V Lepchenko	7^{7}	6
(Austria) S Kraus	6^{4}	3
WC	(France) K Mladenovic	6	7^{8}
(United Kingdom) F Jones	4	6^{6}

Quarterfinals
A Falei	4	1
(Netherlands) S Lamens	6	6
LL	(United States) V Lepchenko	3	4
WC	(France) K Mladenovic	6	6

Semifinals
(Netherlands) S Lamens	4	6	6
WC	(France) K Mladenovic	6	0	0

== Qualifying ==
=== Seeds ===
1. Aliona Falei (moved to main draw)
2. (Canada) Marina Stakusic (first round)
3. Julia Avdeeva (qualifying competition, lucky loser)
4. (Croatia) Tena Lukas (qualified)
5. (Canada) Katherine Sebov (qualifying competition, lucky loser)
6. (United States) Varvara Lepchenko (qualifying competition, lucky loser)
7. (United States) Maria Mateas (qualified)
8. (Romania) Gabriela Lee (qualified, withdrew)

=== Qualifiers ===
1. (Romania) ~~Gabriela Lee~~
2. (Netherlands) Anouk Koevermans
3. (United States) Maria Mateas
4. (Croatia) Tena Lukas

=== Lucky losers ===
1. Julia Avdeeva
2. (Canada) Katherine Sebov
3. (United States) Varvara Lepchenko

=== Qualifying draw ===
==== First qualifier ====
First round
Alt	(Czech Republic) Michaela Bayerlová	3	2
(Czech Republic) Anna Sisková	6	6
WC	(Portugal) Amália Suciu	1	1
8	(Romania) Gabriela Lee	6	6

Qualifying competition
(Czech Republic) Anna Sisková	1	6	1
8	(Romania) Gabriela Lee	6	3	6

==== Second qualifier ====
First round
2	(Canada) Marina Stakusic	3	7	5
(Netherlands) Anouk Koevermans	6	5	7
WC	(Portugal) Sara Lança	2	0
6	(United States) Varvara Lepchenko	6	6

Qualifying competition
(Netherlands) Anouk Koevermans	6	3	6
6	(United States) Varvara Lepchenko	4	6	3

==== Third qualifier ====
First round
3	Julia Avdeeva	6	6
(Argentina) Paula Ormaechea	2	3
(Austria) Tamira Paszek	3	3
7	(United States) Maria Mateas	6	6

Qualifying competition
3	Julia Avdeeva	5	2
7	(United States) Maria Mateas	7	6

==== Fourth qualifier ====
First round
4	(Croatia) Tena Lukas	6	7
(Serbia) Mia Ristić	4	5
(Sweden) Jacqueline Cabaj Awad	6	1	0
5	(Canada) Katherine Sebov	4	6	6

Qualifying competition
4	(Croatia) Tena Lukas	6	6
5	(Canada) Katherine Sebov	2	2
