= 2022 Oeiras Ladies Open – Doubles =

Doubles
- 2022 Oeiras Ladies Open

Final
- Champions: (Poland) Katarzyna Piter (Belgium) Kimberley Zimmermann
- Runners-up: (Germany) Katharina Gerlach (Serbia) Natalija Stevanović
- Score: 6–1, 6–1

Events
Singles	Doubles
← 2021 ·	Oeiras Ladies Open	· 2023 →

Lidziya Marozava and Andreea Mitu were the defending champions but Marozava chose not to participate. Mitu partnered alongside Oksana Kalashnikova but lost in the semifinals to Katharina Gerlach and Natalija Stevanović.

Katarzyna Piter and Kimberley Zimmermann won the title, defeating Gerlach and Stevanović in the final, 6–1, 6–1.

== Seeds ==
1. (Poland) Katarzyna Piter / (Belgium) Kimberley Zimmermann (champions)
2. (Georgia (country)) Oksana Kalashnikova / (Romania) Andreea Mitu (semifinals)
3. (Poland) Katarzyna Kawa / (Czech Republic) Renata Voráčová (first round)
4. (United Kingdom) Alicia Barnett / (United Kingdom) Olivia Nicholls (quarterfinals)

== Draw ==
=== Key ===
- Q = Qualifier
- WC = Wild card
- LL = Lucky loser
- Alt = Alternate
- SE = Special exempt
- PR = Protected ranking
- ITF = ITF entry
- JE = Junior exempt
- w/o = Walkover
- r = Retired
- d = Defaulted
- SR = Special ranking

=== Draw ===
First round
1	(Poland) K Piter (Belgium) K Zimmermann	6	6^{5}	[10]
WC	(Portugal) M Jorge (Portugal) F Jorge	4	7^{7}	[7]
(Lithuania) J Mikulskytė (Czech Republic) A Sisková	7	2	[10]
WC	(Spain) J Bouzas Maneiro (Portugal) I Murta	5	6	[6]
4	(United Kingdom) A Barnett (United Kingdom) O Nicholls	6^{0}	6	[10]
(United Kingdom) E Appleton (United Kingdom) A Collins	7^{7}	4	[8]
(Bulgaria) I Shinikova; N Vikhlyantseva	3	4
V Lapko (Germany) E Lys	6	6
(Spain) C Bucșa (Spain) G García Pérez	7	6
WC	(Brazil) I Gamarra Martins (Portugal) AF Santos	5	1
(Germany) K Gerlach (Serbia) N Stevanović	3	6	[11]
3	(Poland) K Kawa (Czech Republic) R Voráčová	6	1	[9]
(Spain) C Cerviño Ruiz (Spain) O Parres Azcoitia	0	6	[10]
Alt	(Portugal) M Garcia (Portugal) S Lança	6	1	[5]
(Latvia) D Marcinkēviča (United Kingdom) E Webley-Smith	2	4
2	(Georgia (country)) O Kalashnikova (Romania) A Mitu	6	6

Quarterfinals
1	(Poland) K Piter (Belgium) K Zimmermann	5	6	[10]
(Lithuania) J Mikulskytė (Czech Republic) A Sisková	7	1	[4]
4	(United Kingdom) A Barnett (United Kingdom) O Nicholls	7^{7}	4	[7]
V Lapko (Germany) E Lys	6^{4}	6	[10]
(Spain) C Bucșa (Spain) G García Pérez
(Germany) K Gerlach (Serbia) N Stevanović	w/o
(Spain) C Cerviño Ruiz (Spain) O Parres Azcoitia	5	3
2	(Georgia (country)) O Kalashnikova (Romania) A Mitu	7	6

Semifinals
1	(Poland) K Piter (Belgium) K Zimmermann	6	6
V Lapko (Germany) E Lys	3	4
(Germany) K Gerlach (Serbia) N Stevanović	6	6
2	(Georgia (country)) O Kalashnikova (Romania) A Mitu	0	2

Final
1	(Poland) K Piter (Belgium) K Zimmermann	6	6
(Germany) K Gerlach (Serbia) N Stevanović	1	1
