= Ma Shuyue =

Chinese tennis player

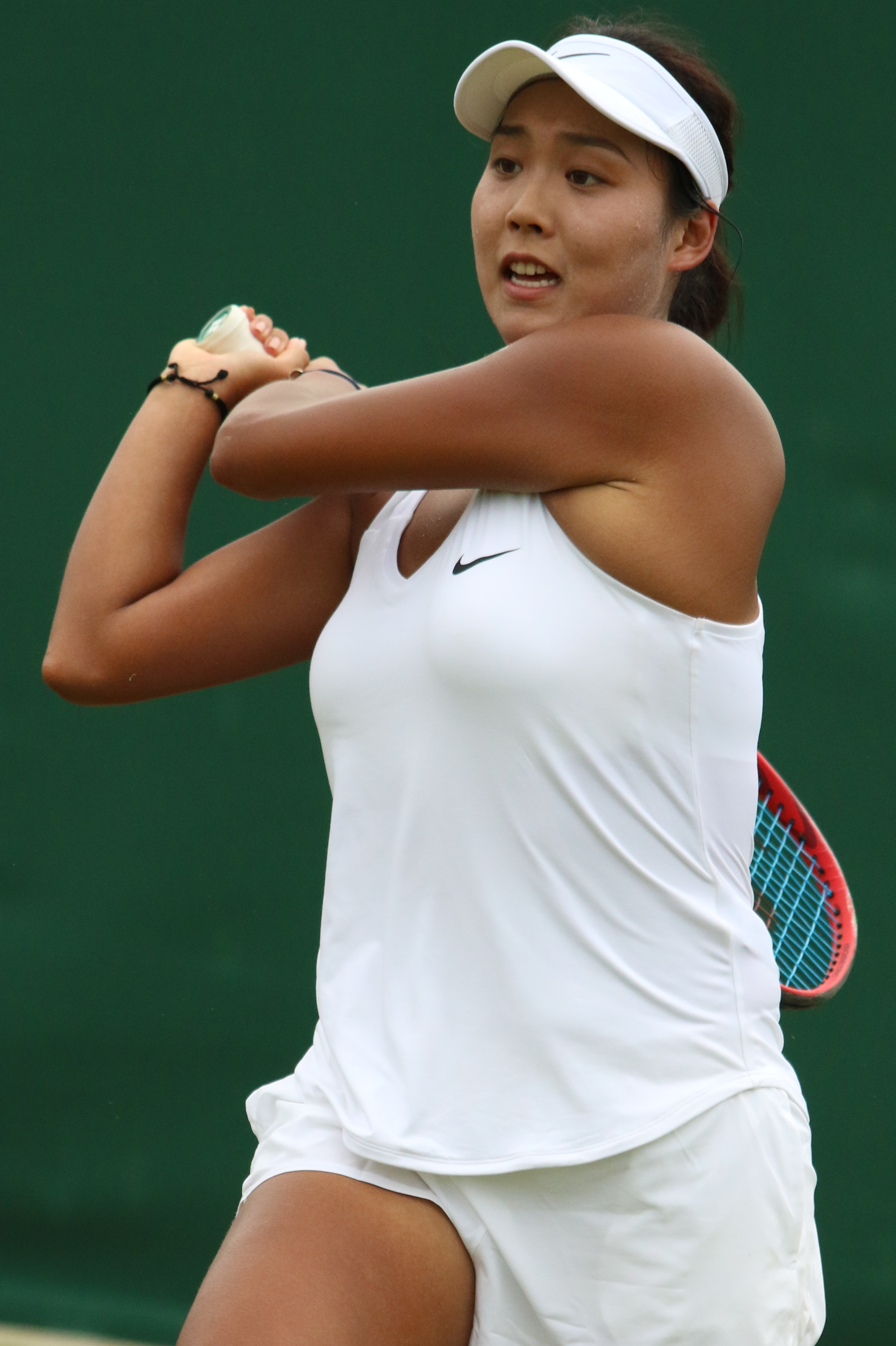
- Ma Shuyue in 2019
- Country (sports): China
- Born: 29 June 1999 (age 27) China
- Plays: Right (two-handed backhand)
- Prize money: $90,055

Singles
- Career record: 130–119
- Career titles: 2 ITF
- Highest ranking: No. 204 (20 May 2019)

Grand Slam singles results
- Australian Open: Q1 (2020)

Doubles
- Career record: 24–42
- Career titles: 0
- Highest ranking: No. 499 (10 June 2019)
- Last updated on: 2 July 2026.

Ma Shuyue (Chinese: 马姝玥; pinyin: Mǎ Shūyuè; Mandarin pronunciation: [mà ʂú ɥê]; born 29 June 1999) is an inactive Chinese tennis player.

On 20 May 2019, she achieved a career-high singles ranking of world No. 204. On 10 June 2019, she peaked at No. 499 in the doubles rankings.

Ma made her WTA Tour main-draw debut at the 2017 Shenzhen Open, partnering Zhang Kailin, and losing to Raquel Atawo and Xu Yifan.

== ITF Circuit finals ==
=== Singles: 3 (2 titles, 1 runner-up) ===
Legend $25,000 tournaments $15,000 tournaments	Finals by surface Hard (1–1) Carpet (1–0)

Result	W–L	Date	Tournament	Tier	Surface	Opponent	Score
Loss	0–1	Jan 2019	ITF Hong Kong, China	25,000	Hard	(Ukraine) Daria Lopatetska	4–6, 3–6
Win	1–1	Feb 2019	AK Ladies Open, Germany	25,000	Carpet (i)	(Belgium) Maryna Zanevska	6–4, 5–7, 7–5
Win	2–1	Apr 2019	ITF Hong Kong	25,000	Hard	(Australia) Maddison Inglis	4–6, 6–3, 6–2

=== Doubles: 2 (2 runner-ups) ===
Legend $25,000 tournaments $15,000 tournaments	Finals by surface Hard (0–1) Clay (0–1)

Result	W–L	Date	Tournament	Tier	Surface	Partner	Opponents	Score
Loss	0–1	Sep 2018	ITF Pula, Italy	25,000	Clay	(China) Cao Siqi	(Germany) Tayisiya Morderger (Germany) Yana Morderger	7–6^{(0)}, 6–7^{(9)}, [10–12]
Loss	0–2	Jul 2021	ITF Lisbon, Portugal	25,000	Hard	(Brazil) Ingrid Martins	(South Korea) Han Na-lae (Japan) Momoko Kobori	3–6, 1–6
