= Oeiras Ladies Open =

WTA 125
- Event name: Oeiras Jamor Ladies Open
- Location: Oeiras, Portugal
- Venue: Centro Desportivo Nacional do Jamor
- Category: WTA 125
- Surface: Clay / Outdoor
- Draw: 32S/16Q/16D
- Prize money: €195,652
- Website: oeirasopen.pt

Current champions (2026)
- Singles: (Poland) Maja Chwalińska
- Doubles: (Slovenia) Veronika Erjavec (France) Kristina Mladenovic

The Oeiras Jamor Ladies Open (Portuguese: ITF feminino de Oeiras) is a tournament for professional female tennis players played on outdoor clay courts. It is a WTA 125 event as it was upgraded from an ITF W100 event in 2024, having grown its status every year since its introduction in 2021. The first edition was a $60,000 ITF Women's World Tennis Tour event, the second edition in 2022 was a $80,000 event and the third in 2023 was a $100,000 event.

== Past finals ==
=== Singles ===
Year	Champion	Runner-up	Score
2026	(Poland) Maja Chwalińska	(Austria) Sinja Kraus	6–1, 6–3
2025	(Hungary) Dalma Gálfi	(United States) Katie Volynets	4–6, 6–1, 6–2
2024	(Netherlands) Suzan Lamens	(Denmark) Clara Tauson	6–4, 5–7, 6–4
⬆️ WTA $125,000 event ⬆️
2023	(Montenegro) Danka Kovinić	(Spain) Rebeka Masarova	6–2, 6–2
2022	(Italy) Elisabetta Cocciaretto	(Bulgaria) Viktoriya Tomova	7–6^{(7–5)}, 2–6, 7–5
2021	(Slovenia) Polona Hercog	(France) Clara Burel	walkover

=== Doubles ===
Year	Champions	Runners-up	Score
2026	(Slovenia) Veronika Erjavec (France) Kristina Mladenovic	(Switzerland) Naïma Karamoko (Latvia) Darja Semeņistaja	6–2, 7–5
2025	(Portugal) Francisca Jorge (2) (Portugal) Matilde Jorge (2)	(Czech Republic) Anastasia Dețiuc (Romania) Patricia Maria Țig	6–1, 6–2
2024	(Portugal) Francisca Jorge (Portugal) Matilde Jorge	(United Kingdom) Harriet Dart (France) Kristina Mladenovic	6–0, 6–4
⬆️ WTA $125,000 event ⬆️
2023	(Norway) Ulrikke Eikeri (Japan) Eri Hozumi	(Portugal) Francisca Jorge (Portugal) Matilde Jorge	4–6, 6–4, [10–5]
2022	(Poland) Katarzyna Piter (Belgium) Kimberley Zimmermann	(Germany) Katharina Gerlach (Serbia) Natalija Stevanović	6–1, 6–1
2021	(Belarus) Lidziya Marozava (Romania) Andreea Mitu	(Russia) Marina Melnikova (Switzerland) Conny Perrin	3–6, 6–4, [10–3]
