= Katie Volynets =

American tennis player (born 2001)

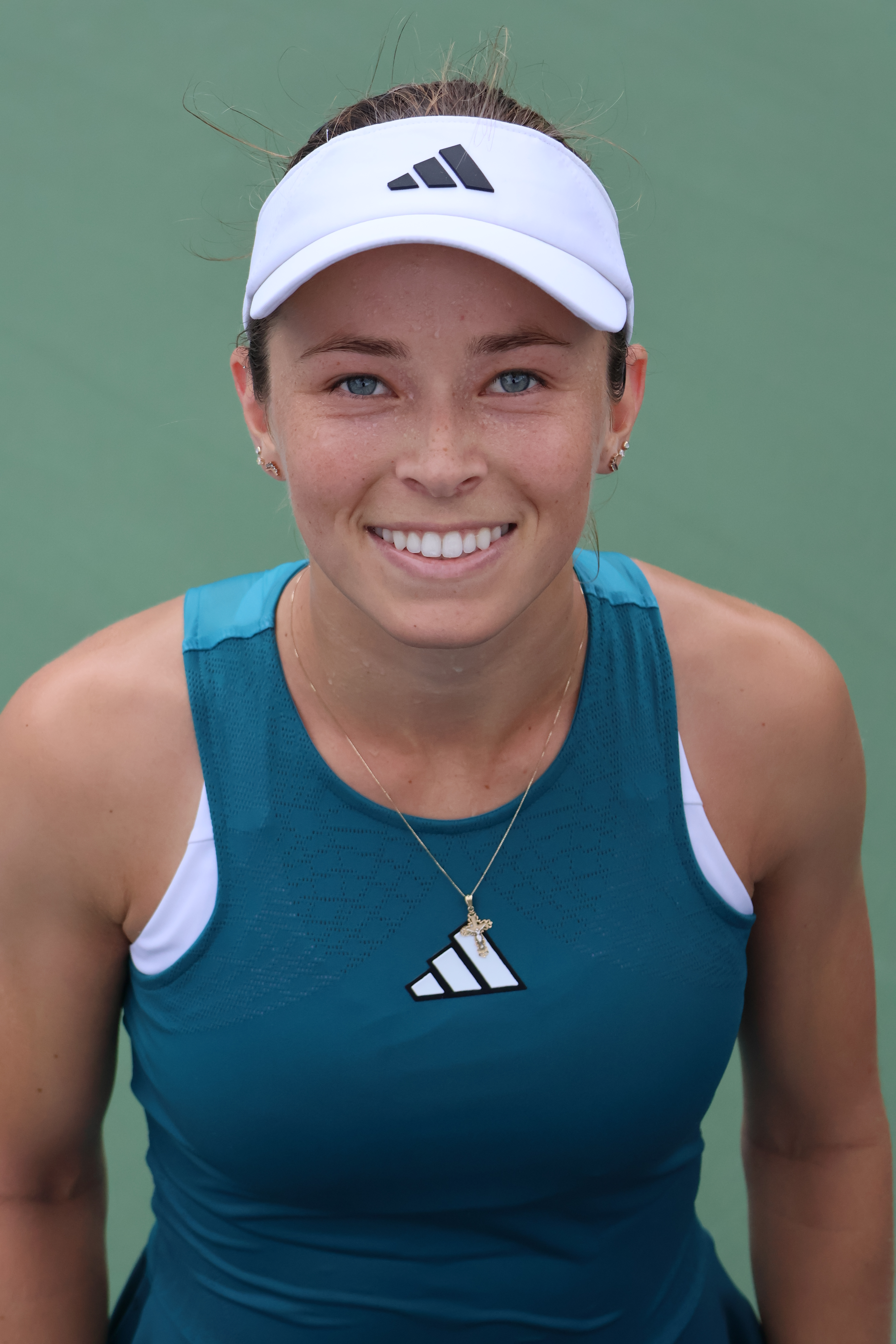
- Volynets at the 2023 US Open
- Country (sports): United States
- Born: December 31, 2001 (age 24) Walnut Creek, California, US
- Height: 1.70 m (5 ft 7 in)
- Turned pro: 2018
- Plays: Right-handed (two-handed backhand)
- Coach: Collin Altamirano
- Prize money: US$ 3,261,221

Singles
- Career record: 278–191
- Career titles: 2 WTA 125
- Highest ranking: No. 56 (July 29, 2024)
- Current ranking: No. 81 (26 October, 2026)

Grand Slam singles results
- Australian Open: 3R (2023)
- French Open: 2R (2022, 2024, 2026)
- Wimbledon: 2R (2024, 2025)
- US Open: 1R (2019, 2021, 2023, 2024, 2025, 2026)

Doubles
- Career record: 19–26
- Career titles: 1 WTA 125
- Highest ranking: No. 447 (May 9, 2022)
- Current ranking: No. 512 (September 28, 2026)

Grand Slam doubles results
- Australian Open: 1R (2026)
- French Open: 1R (2025)
- US Open: 1R (2024)

Grand Slam mixed doubles results
- Wimbledon: 2R (2024)
- Last updated on: September 28, 2026.

Katie Volynets (born December 31, 2001) is an American professional tennis player. She has a career-high singles ranking of world No. 56 by the WTA, achieved on July 29, 2024. Volynets has won three WTA 125 titles, two in singles and one in doubles.

== Early life ==
Volynets was born in Walnut Creek, California. Her parents had emigrated from Ukraine, and she still has extended family in Kyiv and Dnipro.

== Career ==
=== 2019: Grand Slam tournament debut ===
On August 11, 2019, Volynets won the USTA Girls 18s National Championships final over Emma Navarro, earning her a wildcard entry into the singles main draw of the US Open. She lost in the first round to eventual champion Bianca Andreescu.

=== 2021: Indian Wells and Wimbledon debuts ===
In May, she won her first singles title on the ITF Circuit, at the $100k event in Bonita Springs.

She qualified for the Wimbledon Championships, losing to Irina-Camelia Begu in the first round.

Volynets received a wildcard into the singles main draw of the US Open, but was eliminated in the first round by Ajla Tomljanović.

In October, she made her debut at the WTA 1000 level in Indian Wells, also receiving a wildcard, but once more losing in the first round, this time to Petra Martić.

=== 2022: Top 150 debut, first major win ===
Volynets played in Indian Wells again as a wildcard where she recorded her first win at the WTA 1000-level against Arantxa Rus, before losing to 23rd seed Daria Kasatkina in the second round.

She won the USTA Wildcard Challenge for the French Open where she recorded her first Grand Slam tournament match win over Viktorija Golubic. At the Nottingham Open, she lost to Heather Watson in the first round.

=== 2023: Major third round, first WTA Tour semifinal, top 100 ===
In January, she qualified for the main draw of Auckland Open, where she lost in the first round to Venus Williams, in straight sets.

She reached the Australian Open third round defeating two Russian players, Evgeniya Rodina and world No. 9, Veronika Kudermetova, for her first top-10 win, and becoming the first American qualifier to reach the women's singles third round at the Australian Open since Jennifer Brady in 2017. As a result, she reached a career-high ranking of No. 96 on January 30, 2023.

At the ATX Open, she rallied from 5–0 down and a match point in the third set to win her match against third seed Anastasia Potapova and reach her first WTA Tour quarterfinal. Next, she defeated wildcard Peyton Stearns to reach her first semifinal. As a result, her ranking rose to world No. 74, on 6 March 2023.

She qualified for the US Open but lost in the first round to Wang Xinyu.

=== 2024: Two WTA 1000 third rounds, WTA 125 title, top 60 ===
At the Thailand Open in Hua Hin, Volynets reached the quarterfinals defeating Tamara Zidanšek and upsetting fourth seed Tatjana Maria before losing to Wang Yafan in a third set tiebreak. At the ATX Open, Volynets reached the second round as a wildcard entrant defeating Renata Zarazúa then losing to third seed Danielle Collins.

From the WTA 1000 Indian Wells Open, she received a wildcard and defeated Mirra Andreeva and sixth seed Ons Jabeur, both in straight sets to reach the third round for the first time at this level. She lost to wildcard Caroline Wozniacki. Next, Volynets qualified for the Miami Open, making her debut at this WTA 1000, and recorded a first-round win over former Grand Slam champion Sofia Kenin, before losing to 12th seed Jasmine Paolini.

She qualified for the Charleston Open and defeated Arantxa Rus in three hours 43 minutes with two tiebreaks, saving four match points. In her next match, she lost to 10th seed Emma Navarro.

Volynets also qualified for the main draw at the Italian Open and defeated Wang Yafan, taking her revenge for the loss in February in Hua Hin, before losing in three sets to second seed Aryna Sabalenka. Again as a qualifier, at the French Open, Volynets defeated Aleksandra Krunić then lost to fifth seed Markéta Vondroušová.

In June, Volynets won her maiden WTA 125 title at the Makarska International in Croatia, defeating second seed and defending champion, Mayar Sherif, in the final.

Volynets qualified for the main draw at Wimbledon where she won her first-round match against María Lourdes Carlé, before losing her next contest to 31st seed and eventual champion, Barbora Krejčíková.

Ranked No. 57 at the US Open, Volynets lost in the first round to Karolína Muchová. Seeded sixth at the Thailand Open 2, she defeated Clara Tauson in the first round, but lost her next match to Tamara Zidanšek, who took her revenge for the loss in the previous edition of the tournament in February. At the China Open, Volynets reached her second WTA 1000 third round, defeating qualifier Dalma Gálfi and 14th seed Marta Kostyuk for her third top 20 win. She lost to Naomi Osaka in straight sets. At the next WTA 1000, the Wuhan Open, she received a wildcard for her debut at the tournament, but lost in the first round to Anastasia Potapova, in three sets.

=== 2025: Two WTA 125 finals ===
Volynets started her 2025 season at the Auckland Open, recording wins over Erika Andreeva and Ann Li to reach the quarterfinals, where she lost to Alycia Parks.

Seeded second, she was runner-up at the WTA 125 Oeiras Ladies Open in April, losing to Dalma Gálfi in the final. The following week she defeated Petra Kvitová to reach the second round at the WTA 1000 Madrid Open, where she lost to 13th seed Diana Shnaider.

In October, Volynets reached the final at the WTA 125 Suzhou Ladies Open, losing to Viktorija Golubic in three sets. At the Guangzhou Open, she qualified for the main-draw and then defeated fellow qualifier Katarzyna Kawa and lucky loser Victoria Jiménez Kasintseva, before losing in the quarterfinals to wildcard entrant Zhang Shuai.

=== 2026: Second WTA Tour semifinal ===
In February at the Ostrava Open, Volynets defeated Linda Klimovičová, top seed Tatjana Maria and Alycia Parks to make it through to her second WTA semifinal. She lost in the last four to eventual champion Katie Boulter.

Volynets was runner-up at the WTA 125 Hall of Fame Open, losing the final to Tatjana Maria. At the same tournament, she won the doubles, partnering with Iryna Shymanovich to overcome Savannah Broadus and Kylie Collins in the championship match. Two weeks later at the Memphis Classic, she recorded wins over third seed Viktorija Golubic and qualifier Iryna Shymanovich to reach the quarterfinals, where she lost to Darja Vidmanova.

In August, Volynets won her second WTA 125 singles title at the Philly Open, defeating Tereza Valentová in the final. The following month at the Korea Open, she overcame Elvina Kalieva and eighth seed Kamilla Rakhimova to make it through to the quarterfinals, at which point her run was ended by second seed and eventual champion Kimberly Birrell.

== Performance timeline ==
Key
| W | F | SF | QF | #R | RR | Q# | DNQ | A | NH |

(W) winner; (F) finalist; (SF) semifinalist; (QF) quarterfinalist; (#R) rounds 4, 3, 2, 1; (RR) round-robin stage; (Q#) qualification round; (DNQ) did not qualify; (A) absent; (NH) not held; (SR) strike rate (events won / competed); (W–L) win–loss record.
To avoid confusion and double counting, these charts are updated at the conclusion of a tournament or when the player's participation has ended.

Only main-draw results in WTA Tour, Grand Slam tournaments, Fed Cup / Billie Jean King Cup and Olympic Games are included in win–loss records.

=== Singles ===
Current through the 2026 US Open.

| Tournament | 2019 | 2020 | 2021 | 2022 | 2023 | 2024 | 2025 | 2026 | SR | W–L | Win% |
|---|---|---|---|---|---|---|---|---|---|---|---|
Grand Slam tournaments
| Australian Open | A | A | A | 1R | 3R | 1R | 1R | 1R | 0 / 5 | 2–5 | 29% |
| French Open | A | A | A | 2R | 1R | 2R | 1R | 2R | 0 / 5 | 3–5 | 38% |
| Wimbledon | A | NH | 1R | Q2 | 1R | 2R | 2R | Q3 | 0 / 4 | 2–4 | 33% |
| US Open | 1R | A | 1R | Q1 | 1R | 1R | 1R | 1R | 0 / 6 | 0–6 | 0% |
| Win–loss | 0–1 | 0–0 | 0–2 | 1–2 | 2–4 | 2–4 | 1–4 | 1–2 | 0 / 19 | 7–19 | 27% |
WTA 1000
| Qatar Open (Note: The first Premier 5 event of the year has switched back and forth between the Dubai Tennis Championships and the Qatar Ladies Open since 2009 until 2024. Dubai was classified as a Premier 5 event from 2009 to 2011 before being succeeded by Doha for the 2012–2014 period. In 2015, Dubai regained its Premier 5 status while Doha was demoted to Premier status. The Premier 5 tournaments were reclassified as WTA 1000 tournaments in 2021.) | A | A | A | A | A | A | 1R | A | 0 / 1 | 0–1 | 0% |
| Dubai | A | A | A | A | A | A | A | Q2 | 0 / 0 | 0–0 | – |
| Indian Wells Open | A | NH | 1R | 2R | 1R | 3R | 1R | 2R | 0 / 6 | 4–6 | 40% |
| Miami Open | A | NH | A | A | Q1 | 2R | 1R | 1R | 0 / 3 | 1–3 | 25% |
| Madrid Open | A | NH | A | A | 1R | Q1 | 2R | 1R | 0 / 3 | 1–3 | 25% |
| Italian Open | A | A | A | A | 1R | 2R | 2R | Q2 | 0 / 3 | 2–3 | 40% |
| Canadian Open | A | NH | A | A | A | 1R | 1R | A | 0 / 2 | 0–2 | 0% |
| Cincinnati Open | A | Q2 | Q1 | A | A | Q2 | 1R | 1R | 0 / 2 | 0–2 | 0% |
| China Open | A | NH | | | A | 3R | 2R | | 0 / 1 | 2–1 | 67% |
| Wuhan Open | A | NH | | | | 1R | A | | 0 / 1 | 0–1 | 0% |
| Win–loss | 0–0 | 0–0 | 0–1 | 1–1 | 0–3 | 6–6 | 3–8 | 1–3 | 0 / 22 | 11–22 | 33% |
Career statistics
| | 2019 | 2020 | 2021 | 2022 | 2023 | 2024 | 2025 | 2026 | SR | W–L | Win% |
| Tournaments | 2 | 1 | 6 | 6 | 13 | 17 | 21 | 10 | Career total: 42 | | |
| Titles | 0 | 0 | 0 | 0 | 0 | 0 | 0 | 0 | Career total: 0 | | |
| Finals | 0 | 0 | 0 | 0 | 0 | 0 | 0 | 0 | Career total: 0 | | |
| Overall win–loss | 0–2 | 1–1 | 0–6 | 2–6 | 7–13 | 13–17 | 11–21 | 5–10 | 0 / 76 | 39–76 | 34% |
| Year-end ranking (Note: 2018: WTA ranking–743.) | 438 | 315 | 178 | 110 | 109 | 62 | 89 | | $2,787,095 | | |

== WTA 125 finals ==
=== Singles: 5 (2 titles, 3 runner-ups) ===
| Result | W–L | Date | Tournament | Surface | Opponent | Score |
|---|---|---|---|---|---|---|
| Win | 1–0 | Jun 2024 | Makarska International, Croatia | Clay | (Egypt) Mayar Sherif | 3–6, 6–2, 6–1 |
| Loss | 1–1 | Apr 2025 | Oeiras Ladies Open, Portugal | Clay | (Hungary) Dalma Gálfi | 6–4, 1–6, 2–6 |
| Loss | 1–2 | Oct 2025 | Suzhou Ladies Open, China | Hard | (Switzerland) Viktorija Golubic | 6–4, 4–6, 4–6 |
| Loss | 1–3 | Jul 2026 | Hall of Fame Open, United States | Grass | (Germany) Tatjana Maria | 2–6, 4–6 |
| Win | 2–3 | Aug 2026 | Philly Open, United States | Hard | (Czech Republic) Tereza Valentová | 6–3, 7–5 |

=== Doubles: 1 (title) ===
| Result | W–L | Date | Tournament | Surface | Partner | Opponents | Score |
|---|---|---|---|---|---|---|---|
| Win | 1–0 | Jul 2026 | Hall of Fame Open, United States | Grass | Iryna Shymanovich | (United States) Savannah Broadus (United States) Kylie Collins | 6–2, 7–6^{(8–6)} |

== ITF Circuit finals ==
=== Singles: 3 (2 titles, 1 runner–up) ===
| Legend W100 tournaments (2–0) W25 tournaments (0–1) | Finals by surface Hard (0–1) Clay (2–0) |

| Result | W–L | Date | Tournament | Tier | Surface | Opponent | Score |
|---|---|---|---|---|---|---|---|
| Loss | 0–1 | Nov 2019 | ITF Malibu, United States | W25 | Hard | (Italy) Bianca Turati | 6–4, 4–6, 4–6 |
| Win | 1–1 | May 2021 | Bonita Springs Championships, US | W100 | Clay | (Romania) Irina Bara | 6–7^{(4)}, 7–6^{(2)}, 6–1 |
| Win | 2–1 | Apr 2022 | Clay Court Championships, US | W100 | Clay | (China) Wang Xiyu | 6–4, 6–3 |

=== Doubles: 1 (runner-up) ===
| Legend W25 tournaments (0–1) | Finals by surface Clay (0–1) |

| Result | W–L | Date | Tournament | Tier | Surface | Partner | Opponents | Score |
|---|---|---|---|---|---|---|---|---|
| Loss | 0–1 | Sep 2020 | ITF Prague, Czech Republic | W25 | Clay | (United States) Sofia Sewing | (Czech Republic) Anastasia Dețiuc (Czech Republic) Johana Marková | 2–6, 1–6 |

== Wins against top 10 players ==
| No. | Player | Rk | Event | Surface | Rd | Score | Rk | Years | Ref |
|---|---|---|---|---|---|---|---|---|---|
| 1 | Veronika Kudermetova | 9 | Australian Open | Hard | 2R | 6–4, 2–6, 6–2 | 113 | 2023 | |
| 2 | (Tunisia) Ons Jabeur | 6 | Indian Wells | Hard | 2R | 6–4, 6–4 | 131 | 2024 | |

- Key: (Rk) first use, opponent rank; (Rd) round; (Rk) 2nd use, player rank; (Ref) reference; (F) final; (SF) semifinal; (QF) quarterfinal; (#R) rounds 4, 3, 2, 1; (RR) round-robin stage; (Q#) qualifying rounds or stages (3), 2, 1.

== Notes ==
| Preceded by (Argentina) María Carlé | Orange Bowl U16 Girls Champion; 2016 | Succeeded by (Estonia) Katriin Saar |
