= Natalija Stevanović =

Serbian tennis player

Natalija Stevanović Наталија Стевановић
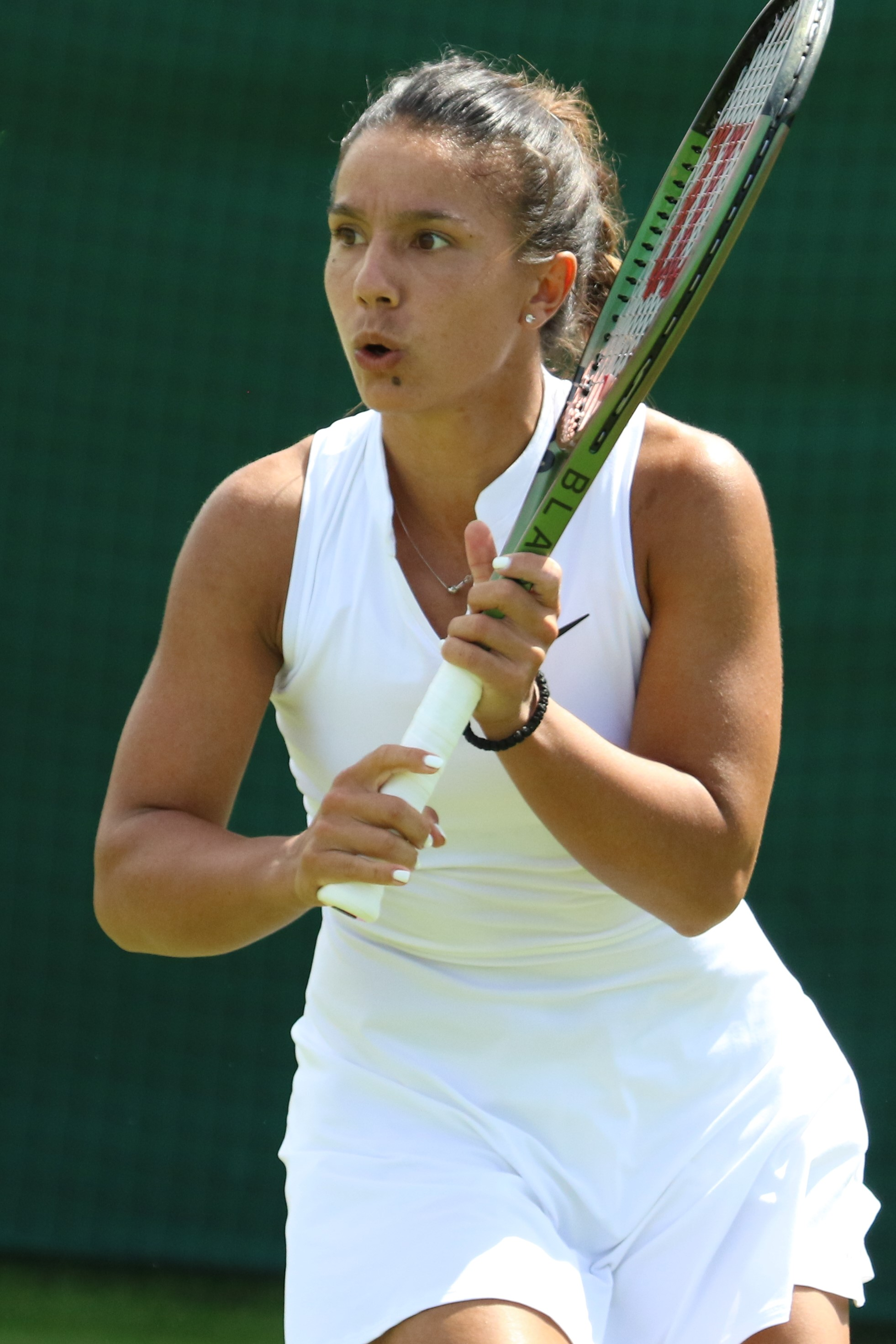
- Stevanović at the 2022 Wimbledon Championships
- Country (sports): Serbia
- Residence: Niš, Serbia
- Born: 25 July 1994 (age 32) Niš, Serbia, FR Yugoslavia
- Height: 1.64 m (5 ft 5 in)
- Plays: Right (two-handed backhand)
- Coach: Nikola Stevanović (2016–2026)
- Prize money: $795,565

Singles
- Career record: 422–303
- Career titles: 14 ITF
- Highest ranking: No. 145 (17 July 2023)

Grand Slam singles results
- Australian Open: Q1 (2020, 2021, 2023, 2024)
- French Open: Q3 (2020)
- Wimbledon: 3R (2023)
- US Open: Q1 (2019, 2021, 2023)

Doubles
- Career record: 192–151
- Career titles: 14 ITF
- Highest ranking: No. 152 (6 May 2024)

Team competitions
- Fed Cup: 0–1

Natalija Stevanović (née Kostić; Serbian Cyrillic: Наталија Стевановић (Костић), born 25 July 1994) is a Serbian inactive tennis player. She reached her best singles ranking of world No. 145 on 17 July 2023. On 6 May 2024, she peaked at No. 152 in the WTA doubles rankings.

She has won 14 singles titles and 14 doubles titles on the ITF Women's Circuit. She was an official member of Serbia Fed Cup team in their World Group quarterfinal tie against Belgium in 2012.

Stevanović is a former junior top-5 player.

== Personal life ==
Kostić was born in Niš to father Đorđe and mother Sonja. Kostić's father was a tennis player. Both sisters, Emilia and Maria, play tennis. Before her marriage to her coach Nikola Stevanović, she competed as Natalija Kostić.

== Career ==
=== 2015–2016 ===
She missed the whole of 2015 and the first half of 2016 season due to operation of liver cyst.

=== 2020: WTA Tour debut ===
She made her WTA Tour main-draw debut in February at the Thailand Open in both singles and doubles, losing in the first round of each.

=== 2023: Wimbledon third round on debut ===
Ranked No. 225, Stevanović qualified for the main draw at Wimbledon, her first time at a Grand Slam tournament. She defeated former world No. 1, Karolína Plíšková and Tamara Korpatsch, both in straight sets, to reach the third round. However, Stevanović then lost to two times Wimbledon champion, Petra Kvitová.

== Grand Slam performance timeline ==
Key
W	F	SF	QF	#R	RR	Q#	DNQ	A	NH

(W) winner; (F) finalist; (SF) semifinalist; (QF) quarterfinalist; (#R) rounds 4, 3, 2, 1; (RR) round-robin stage; (Q#) qualification round; (DNQ) did not qualify; (A) absent; (NH) not held; (SR) strike rate (events won / competed); (W–L) win–loss record.
To avoid confusion and double counting, these charts are updated at the conclusion of a tournament or when the player's participation has ended.

Only main-draw results in WTA Tour, Grand Slam tournaments, Billie Jean King Cup and Olympic Games are included in win–loss records.

=== Singles ===
Current through the 2023 Rosmalen Open.

Tournament	2019	2020	2021	2022	2023	2024	SR	W–L
Grand Slam tournaments
Australian Open	A	Q1	Q1	A	Q1	Q1	0 / 0	0–0
French Open	A	Q3	Q1	A	Q1	Q1	0 / 0	0–0
Wimbledon	A	NH	Q1	Q3	3R	Q2	0 / 1	2–1
US Open	Q1	A	Q1	A	Q1	A	0 / 0	0–0
Win–loss	0–0	0–0	0–0	0–0	2–1	0–0	0 / 1	2–1
Career statistics
Tournaments	0	1	0	0 (Note: During the season, she did not play in the main draw of any WTA Tour-level tournaments. However, she played at the Billie Jean King Cup, which is not counted as a played tournament but matches count.)	2	1	Career total: 3	
Overall win-loss	0–0	0–1	0–0	0–1	1–2	0–0	0 / 3	1–4

== WTA Tour finals ==
=== Doubles: 1 (runner-up) ===
Legend WTA 250 (0–1)	Finals by surface Hard (0–1)

Result	Date	Tournament	Tier	Surface	Partner	Opponents	Score
Loss	Oct 2023	Jasmin Open, Tunisia	WTA 250	Hard	(Japan) Mai Hontama	(Italy) Sara Errani (Italy) Jasmine Paolini	6–2, 6–7^{(4–7)}, [6–10]

== ITF Circuit finals ==
=== Singles: 24 (14 titles, 10 runner-ups) ===
Legend W80 tournaments (0–1) W60 tournaments (0–2) W25/35 tournaments (3–1) W10/15 tournaments (11–6)	Finals by surface Hard (3–4) Clay (10–5) Grass (1–0) Carpet (0–1)

Result	W–L	Date	Tournament	Tier	Surface	Opponent	Score
Win	1–0	Jul 2011	ITF Prokuplje, Serbia	10,000	Clay	(Slovakia) Nikola Vajdová	6–2, 6–3
Win	2–0	Oct 2011	ITF Pirot, Serbia	10,000	Clay	(Serbia) Jovana Jakšić	6–3, 6–3
Win	3–0	Oct 2011	ITF Dubrovnik, Croatia	10,000	Clay	(France) Estelle Guisard	7–6^{(7–2)}, ret.
Win	4–0	Nov 2011	ITF Antalya, Turkey	10,000	Clay	(Romania) Laura Ioana Paar	6–4, 2–6, 6–2
Win	5–0	Jun 2012	ITF Niš, Serbia	10,000	Clay	(Croatia) Indire Akiki	3–6, 6–2, 6–3
Win	6–0	Sep 2012	ITF Belgrade, Serbia	10,000	Clay	(Bulgaria) Dalia Zafirova	6–4, 6–3
Loss	6–1	Dec 2012	ITF Antalya, Turkey	10,000	Clay	(Czech Republic) Denisa Allertová	7–5, 5–7, 1–6
Loss	6–2	Jun 2013	ITF Alkmaar, Netherlands	10,000	Clay	(United States) Bernarda Pera	1–6, 2–6
Loss	6–3	Sep 2013	ITF Belgrade, Serbia	10,000	Clay	(Switzerland) Xenia Knoll	3–6, 3–6
Win	7–3	Aug 2014	ITF Zaječar, Serbia	10,000	Clay	(Ukraine) Elizaveta Ianchuk	6–2, 6–1
Win	8–3	Nov 2014	ITF Heraklion, Greece	10,000	Hard	(Croatia) Tena Lukas	6–0, 6–3
Win	9–3	May 2016	ITF Hammamet, Tunisia	10,000	Clay	(France) Jade Suvrijn	6–2, 4–6, 7–5
Win	10–3	Jun 2016	ITF Hammamet, Tunisia	10,000	Clay	(France) Jade Suvrijn	6–1, 6–0
Loss	10–4	Oct 2016	ITF Hua Hin, Thailand	10,000	Hard	(Thailand) Bunyawi Thamchaiwat	1–6, 3–6
Win	11–4	May 2017	ITF Hammamet, Tunisia	15,000	Clay	(Russia) Nika Kukharchuk	6–2, 6–1
Loss	11–5	May 2017	ITF Hammamet, Tunisia	15,000	Clay	(Australia) Naiktha Bains	4–6, 2–6
Loss	11–6	Feb 2018	ITF Hammamet, Tunisia	15,000	Clay	(Romania) Andreea Roșca	2–6, 4–6
Win	12–6	Nov 2018	ITF Muzaffarnagar, India	25,000	Grass	(Slovakia) Tereza Mihalíková	6–2, 3–1 ret.
Win	13–6	May 2019	ITF Goyang, South Korea	W25	Hard	(United Kingdom) Maia Lumsden	6–3, 6–2
Loss	13–7	Jul 2019	President's Cup, Kazakhstan	W80	Hard	(Czech Republic) Marie Bouzková	3–6, 3–6
Loss	13–8	Sep 2019	Caldas da Rainha Open, Portugal	W60	Hard	(Bulgaria) Isabella Shinikova	3–6, 0–2 ret.
Loss	13–9	Jul 2022	President's Cup, Kazakhstan	W60	Hard	(Japan) Moyuka Uchijima	3–6, 6–7^{(2–7)}
Win	14–9	Sep 2022	ITF Leiria, Portugal	W25	Hard	(Ukraine) Kateryna Volodko	2–6, 6–4, 6–4
Loss	14–10	Jul 2024	ITF Don Benito, Spain	W35	Carpet	(Slovakia) Viktória Hrunčáková	2–6, 6–3, 4–6

=== Doubles: 31 (14 titles, 17 runner-ups) ===
Legend $100,000 tournaments (1–0) $80,000 tournaments (0–1) $60,000 tournaments (0–1) $25,000 tournaments (4–3) $10/15,000 tournaments (9–12)	Finals by surface Hard (2–5) Clay (10–12) Grass (1–0) Carpet (1–0)

Result	W–L	Date	Tournament	Tier	Surface	Partner	Opponents	Score
Loss	0–1	Jun 2011	ITF Niš, Serbia	10,000	Clay	(Croatia) Ivana Klepić	(Czech Republic) Martina Borecká (Slovakia) Vivien Juhászová	6–7^{(7)}, 3–6
Win	1–1	Oct 2011	ITF Umag, Croatia	10,000	Clay	(Slovakia) Lucia Butkovská	(Czech Republic) Petra Krejsová (Czech Republic) Martina Borecká	7–5, 3–6, [10–6]
Win	2–1	Sep 2012	ITF Belgrade, Serbia	10,000	Clay	(Slovakia) Lucia Butkovská	(Slovakia) Karin Morgošová (Slovakia) Michaela Pochabová	6–0, 6–3
Win	3–1	Nov 2012	ITF Antalya, Turkey	10,000	Clay	(Romania) Elena-Teodora Cadar	(Italy) Georgia Brescia (Germany) Theresa Kleinsteuber	6–2, 6–4
Loss	3–2	Jan 2013	ITF Antalya, Turkey	10,000	Clay	(Italy) Gaia Sanesi	(South Korea) Lee Jin-a (South Korea) Yoo Mi	3–6, 1–6
Win	4–2	Nov 2013	ITF Antalya, Turkey	10,000	Clay	(Slovakia) Karin Morgošová	(Bosnia and Herzegovina) Anita Husarić (Belgium) Kimberley Zimmermann	7–6^{(2)}, 6–4
Loss	4–3	Feb 2014	ITF Palmanova, Spain	10,000	Clay	(Netherlands) Anna Alzate Esmurzaeva	(Colombia) Yuliana Lizarazo (Australia) Alexandra Nancarrow	3–6, 4–6
Loss	4–4	Mar 2014	ITF Antalya, Turkey	10,000	Hard	(Slovakia) Chantal Škamlová	(Georgia (country)) Ekaterine Gorgodze (Georgia (country)) Sofia Kvatsabaia	6–4, 1–6, [8–10]
Win	5–4	Aug 2014	ITF Zaječar, Serbia	10,000	Clay	(Ukraine) Elizaveta Ianchuk	(Australia) Alexandra Nancarrow (Czech Republic) Barbora Štefková	6–3, 7–5
Win	6–4	Sep 2014	ITF Belgrade, Serbia	10,000	Clay	(Bulgaria) Isabella Shinikova	(Croatia) Nina Alibalić (Serbia) Nina Stojanović	6–1, 6–2
Loss	6–5	Sep 2014	ITF Algiers, Algeria	10,000	Clay	(Russia) Margarita Lazareva	(Austria) Pia König (Switzerland) Conny Perrin	3–6, 1–6
Loss	6–6	Nov 2014	ITF Heraklion, Greece	10,000	Hard	(Serbia) Nevena Selaković	(Romania) Oana Georgeta Simion (Romania) Raluca Șerban	4–6, 2–6
Loss	6–7	Nov 2014	ITF Antalya, Turkey	10,000	Clay	(Slovakia) Chantal Škamlová	(Ukraine) Alena Fomina (Georgia (country)) Ekaterine Gorgodze	w/o
Win	7–7	May 2016	ITF Hammamet, Tunisia	10,000	Clay	(Ukraine) Ganna Poznikhirenko	(France) Emmanuelle Girard (United Kingdom) Francesca Jones	6–4, 6–4
Loss	7–8	Jul 2016	ITF Niš, Serbia	10,000	Clay	(Serbia) Tamara Čurović	(Russia) Amina Anshba (Russia) Angelina Gabueva	5–7, 5–7
Loss	7–9	May 2017	ITF Hammamet, Tunisia	15,000	Clay	(Bosnia and Herzegovina) Jelena Simić	(Australia) Naiktha Bains (Switzerland) Chiara Grimm	6–4, 3–6, [4–10]
Win	8–9	May 2017	ITF Hammamet, Tunisia	15,000	Clay	(Bosnia and Herzegovina) Jelena Simić	(Germany) Lisa Ponomar (Italy) Dalila Spiteri	6–4, 6–4
Loss	8–10	Sep 2017	ITF Hua Hin, Thailand	15,000	Hard	(China) Wang Xiyu	(China) Zhuoma Ni Ma (China) Zhuoma You Mi	4–6, 3–6
Loss	8–11	Sep 2017	ITF Hua Hin, Thailand	25,000	Hard	(Japan) Michika Ozeki	(South Korea) Kim Na-ri (Russia) Anastasia Pivovarova	4–6, 2–6
Loss	8–12	Jan 2018	ITF Hammamet, Tunisia	15,000	Clay	(Bosnia and Herzegovina) Jelena Simić	(Switzerland) Karin Kennel (Russia) Maria Marfutina	4–6, 3–6
Win	9–12	Feb 2018	ITF Hammamet, Tunisia	15,000	Clay	(Bosnia and Herzegovina) Jelena Simić	(Venezuela) Andrea Gámiz (Argentina) Guadalupe Pérez Rojas	w/o
Loss	9–13	Feb 2018	ITF Hammamet, Tunisia	15,000	Clay	(Bosnia and Herzegovina) Jelena Simić	(Germany) Nora Niedmers (Germany) Natalia Siedliska	6–7^{(7)}, 6–0, [6–10]
Loss	9–14	May 2018	ITF Baotou, China	60,000	Clay (i)	(Russia) Nika Kukharchuk	(Australia) Alison Bai (Bulgaria) Aleksandrina Naydenova	4–6, 6–0, [6–10]
Win	10–14	Jul 2018	ITF Baja, Hungary	25,000	Clay	(Argentina) Paula Ormaechea	(Romania) Nicoleta Dascălu (Bulgaria) Isabella Shinikova	w/o
Win	11–14	Oct 2018	ITF Óbidos, Portugal	25,000	Carpet	(Japan) Akiko Omae	(Latvia) Diāna Marcinkeviča (Hungary) Panna Udvardy	6–3, 4–6, [10–7]
Loss	11–15	Oct 2021	ITF Lisbon, Portugal	W25	Clay	(Argentina) Paula Ormaechea	(Spain) Yvonne Cavallé Reimers (Spain) Ángela Fita Boluda	6–3, 3–6, [4–10]
Win	12–15	Oct 2021	ITF Loulé, Portugal	W25	Hard	(Greece) Despina Papamichail	(Portugal) Francisca Jorge (Portugal) Matilde Jorge	6–2, 7–5
Win	13–15	Mar 2022	ITF Santo Domingo, Dominican Republic	W25	Hard	(Russia) Irina Khromacheva	(Russia) Anastasia Tikhonova (Latvia) Darja Semenistaja	6–1, 7–6^{(5)}
Loss	13–16	Apr 2022	Oeiras Ladies Open, Portugal	W80	Clay	(Germany) Katharina Gerlach	(Poland) Katarzyna Piter (Belgium) Kimberley Zimmermann	1–6, 1–6
Loss	13–17	Sep 2022	ITF Leiria, Portugal	W25	Hard	(South Korea) Choi Ji-hee	(Portugal) Francisca Jorge (Portugal) Matilde Jorge	4–6, 0–6
Win	14–17	Jun 2023	Ilkley Trophy, United Kingdom	W100	Grass	(Japan) Nao Hibino	(Poland) Maja Chwalińska (Czech Republic) Jesika Malečková	7–6^{(10)}, 7–6^{(5)}
