= 2025 Caldas da Rainha Ladies Open =

Tennis tournament

- Date: 14–21 September 2025
- Edition: 6th
- Category: WTA 125 tournaments
- Surface: Hard / Outdoor
- Location: Caldas da Rainha, Portugal

Champions

Singles
- Polina Iatcenko

Doubles
- (United Kingdom) Harriet Dart / (United Kingdom) Maia Lumsden
← 2024 ·	Caldas da Rainha Ladies Open	· 2026 →

The 2025 Full Protein Caldas da Rainha Ladies Open was a professional tennis tournament played on outdoor hard courts. It was the sixth edition of the tournament and part of the 2025 WTA 125 tournaments (upgraded from ITF status in previous years). It took place in Caldas da Rainha, Portugal, between 14 and 21 September 2025.

== Singles main draw entrants ==
=== Seeds ===
Country	Player	Rank	Seed
CRO	Petra Marčinko	127	1
GER	Tamara Korpatsch	153	2
	Alina Korneeva	163	3
UKR	Daria Snigur	185	4
ESP	Kaitlin Quevedo	191	5
POR	Matilde Jorge	212	6
FRA	Tiantsoa Rakotomanga Rajaonah	214	7
NED	Eva Vedder	224	8

- Rankings are as of 8 September 2025.

=== Other entrants ===
The following players received wildcards into the singles main draw:

- (Portugal) Inês Murta
- (Ukraine) Mariia Nozdrachova
- (Czech Republic) Karolína Plíšková
- (Portugal) Ana Filipa Santos

The following player received entry using a protected ranking:

- Vitalia Diatchenko

The following players received entry from the qualifying draw:

- (Turkey) Ayla Aksu
- (Spain) Eva Guerrero Álvarez
- (Poland) Urszula Radwańska
- Anastasia Tikhonova

== Doubles main-draw entrants ==
=== Seeds ===
Country	Player	Country	Player	Rank	Seed
NED	Isabelle Haverlag	NED	Eva Vedder	225	1
GBR	Madeleine Brooks		Anastasia Tikhonova	235	2
GBR	Harriet Dart	GBR	Maia Lumsden	249	3
FRA	Julie Belgraver	CAN	Kayla Cross	353	4

- Rankings as of 8 September 2025.

=== Other entrants ===
The following pair received a wildcard into the doubles main draw:

- (Portugal) Inês Murta / (Portugal) Ana Filipa Santos

== Champions ==
=== Singles ===
- Polina Iatcenko def. (Czech Republic) Gabriela Knutson 6–2, 5–7, 6–2

=== Doubles ===
- (United Kingdom) Harriet Dart / (United Kingdom) Maia Lumsden def. (United Kingdom) Madeleine Brooks / Anastasia Tikhonova, 6–0, 6–3
