= 2025 Caldas da Rainha Ladies Open – Singles =

Singles
- 2025 Caldas da Rainha Ladies Open

Final
- Champion: Polina Iatcenko
- Runner-up: (Czech Republic) Gabriela Knutson
- Score: 6–2, 5–7, 6–2

Events
Singles	Doubles
← 2024 ·	Caldas da Rainha Ladies Open	· 2026 →

Alina Korneeva was the defending champion but lost in the first round to Renáta Jamrichová.

Polina Iatcenko won the title, defeating Gabriela Knutson in the final, 6–2, 5–7, 6–2.

== Seeds ==
1. (Croatia) Petra Marčinko (quarterfinals, retired)
2. (Germany) Tamara Korpatsch (quarterfinals)
3. Alina Korneeva (first round)
4. (Ukraine) Daria Snigur (quarterfinals)
5. (Spain) Kaitlin Quevedo (semifinals)
6. (Portugal) Matilde Jorge (first round)
7. (France) Tiantsoa Rakotomanga Rajaonah (second round)
8. (Netherlands) Eva Vedder (second round)

== Draw ==
=== Key ===
- Q = Qualifier
- WC = Wild card
- LL = Lucky loser
- Alt = Alternate
- ITF = ITF entry
- PR = Protected ranking
- SR = Special ranking
- SE = Special exempt
- JE = Junior exempt
- JR = Junior Accelerator Programme entrant
- CO = College Accelerator Programme entrant
- NG = Next Gen Accelerator Program entrant
- w/o = Walkover
- r = Retired
- d = Defaulted

=== Finals ===
Semifinals
5	(Spain) Kaitlin Quevedo	3	2
Polina Iatcenko	6	6
(Czech Republic) Gabriela Knutson	3	6	6
(United States) Carol Young Suh Lee	6	0	4

Final
Polina Iatcenko	6	5	6
(Czech Republic) Gabriela Knutson	2	7	2

=== Top half ===
First round
1	(Croatia) P Marčinko	7^{7}	6
Q	A Tikhonova	6^{4}	3
WC	(Portugal) I Murta	2	2
(France) H Tan	6	6
(Canada) K Cross	4	2
Q	(Turkey) A Aksu	6	6
(France) A Hesse	1	2
5	(Spain) K Quevedo	6	6
3	A Korneeva	6	4	6^{2}
(Slovakia) R Jamrichová	1	6	7^{7}
Q	(Poland) U Radwańska	2	4
(United Kingdom) H Dart	6	6
WC	(Czech Republic) Ka Plíšková	6	4	7
(France) T Andrianjafitrimo	1	6	5
P Iatcenko	6	6
6	(Portugal) M Jorge	1	1

Second round
1	(Croatia) P Marčinko	6	6
(France) H Tan	3	4
Q	(Turkey) A Aksu	2	6	5
5	(Spain) K Quevedo	6	4	7
(Slovakia) R Jamrichová	6	4	6
(United Kingdom) H Dart	3	6	0
WC	(Czech Republic) Ka Plíšková	7	4	4
P Iatcenko	5	6	6

Quarterfinals
1	(Croatia) P Marčinko	4^{r}
5	(Spain) K Quevedo	3
(Slovakia) R Jamrichová
P Iatcenko	w/o

Semifinals
5	(Spain) K Quevedo	3	2
P Iatcenko	6	6

=== Bottom half ===
First round
8	(Netherlands) E Vedder	6	3	6
(Canada) K Sebov	4	6	3
(Czech Republic) G Knutson	3	7	6
Q	(Spain) E Guerrero Álvarez	6	5	1
(Israel) L Glushko	0	4
K Dmitruk	6	6
(France) J Belgraver	4	1
4	(Ukraine) D Snigur	6	6
7	(France) T Rakotomanga Rajaonah	1	6	6
(Switzerland) V Ryser	6	2	3
PR	V Diatchenko	4	4
(United States) CYS Lee	6	6
(United States) E Kalieva	6	6
WC	(Ukraine) M Nozdrachova	0	0
WC	(Portugal) AF Santos	1	0
2	(Germany) T Korpatsch	6	6

Second round
8	(Netherlands) E Vedder	7^{7}	2	4
(Czech Republic) G Knutson	6^{4}	6	6
K Dmitruk	1	1
4	(Ukraine) D Snigur	6	6
7	(France) T Rakotomanga Rajaonah	3	2
(United States) CYS Lee	6	6
(United States) E Kalieva	3	4
2	(Germany) T Korpatsch	6	6

Quarterfinals
(Czech Republic) G Knutson	6	6
4	(Ukraine) D Snigur	4	3
(United States) CYS Lee	3	6	6
2	(Germany) T Korpatsch	6	1	4

Semifinals
(Czech Republic) G Knutson	3	6	6
(United States) CYS Lee	6	0	4

== Qualifying ==
=== Seeds ===
1. Anastasia Tikhonova (qualified)
2. (France) Amandine Hesse (moved to main draw)
3. (Spain) Eva Guerrero Álvarez (qualified)
4. (Turkey) Ayla Aksu (qualified)
5. (Israel) Lina Glushko (moved to main draw)
6. (Netherlands) Anouck Vrancken Peeters (first round)
7. Ekaterina Ovcharenko (qualifying competition)
8. (Poland) Urszula Radwańska (qualified)

=== Qualifiers ===
1. Anastasia Tikhonova
2. (Poland) Urszula Radwańska
3. (Spain) Eva Guerrero Álvarez
4. (Turkey) Ayla Aksu

=== Qualifying draw ===
==== First qualifier ====
Qualifying competition
1	Anastasia Tikhonova	6	6
	(Germany) Tayisiya Morderger	2	4

==== Second qualifier ====
First round				Qualifying competition
				2	(France) Amandine Hesse
				8	(Poland) Urszula Radwańska	w/o
WC	(Portugal) Sara Lança	0	1	8	(Poland) Urszula Radwańska	w/o
8	(Poland) Urszula Radwańska	6	6

==== Third qualifier ====
First round
3	(Spain) Eva Guerrero Álvarez	6	6
(Germany) Yana Morderger	3	1
(United States) Ashley Lahey	3	7	6
6	(Netherlands) Anouck Vrancken Peeters	6	5	1

Qualifying competition
3	(Spain) Eva Guerrero Álvarez	7	6
(United States) Ashley Lahey	5	4

==== Fourth qualifier ====
First round
4	(Turkey) Ayla Aksu	6	7
(France) Diana Martynov	2	5
(France) Alice Robbe	4	2
7	Ekaterina Ovcharenko	6	6

Qualifying competition
4	(Turkey) Ayla Aksu	6	6
7	Ekaterina Ovcharenko	1	1
