= 2024 Caldas da Rainha Ladies Open =

Tennis tournament

- Date: 16–22 September 2024
- Edition: 5th
- Category: ITF Women's World Tennis Tour
- Prize money: $100,000
- Surface: Hard / Outdoor
- Location: Caldas da Rainha, Portugal

Champions

Singles
- Alina Korneeva

Doubles
- (United Kingdom) Jodie Burrage / Anastasia Tikhonova
← 2023 ·	Caldas da Rainha Ladies Open	· 2025 →

The 2024 Caldas da Rainha Ladies Open was a professional tennis tournament played on outdoor hard courts. It was the fifth edition of the tournament, which was part of the 2024 ITF Women's World Tennis Tour. It took place in Caldas da Rainha, Portugal, between 16 and 22 September 2024.

== Champions ==
=== Singles ===
- Alina Korneeva def. Anastasia Zakharova, 6–1, 6–4

=== Doubles ===
- (United Kingdom) Jodie Burrage / Anastasia Tikhonova def. (Portugal) Francisca Jorge / (Portugal) Matilde Jorge, 7–6^{(7–3)}, 6–4

== Singles main draw entrants ==
=== Seeds ===
Country	Player	Rank	Seed
CRO	Petra Martić	105	1
UKR	Daria Snigur	123	2
USA	Ann Li	124	3
	Anastasia Zakharova	146	4
GBR	Lily Miyazaki	166	5
CRO	Antonia Ružić	173	6
GER	Mona Barthel	175	7
ITA	Lucrezia Stefanini	178	8

- Rankings are as of 9 September 2024.

=== Other entrants ===
The following players received wildcards into the singles main draw:

- (Portugal) Teresa Franco Dias
- (Croatia) Petra Martić
- (France) Kristina Mladenovic
- (Portugal) Matilde do Canto Parreira

The following players received entry from the qualifying draw:

- Vitalia Diatchenko
- (United Kingdom) Sarah Beth Grey
- (Slovakia) Renáta Jamrichová
- Anna Kubareva
- (Japan) Hiroko Kuwata
- (Estonia) Elena Malõgina
- (France) Alice Robbe
- (Italy) Camilla Rosatello

The following players received entry as lucky losers:

- (Germany) Mina Hodzic
- (Georgia (country)) Sofia Shapatava
