= 2026 Caldas da Rainha Ladies Open – Singles =

Singles
- 2026 Caldas da Rainha Ladies Open

Final
- Champion: (Italy) Lisa Pigato
- Runner-up: (Czech Republic) Gabriela Knutson
- Score: 6–4, 6–2

Events
Singles	Doubles
- Caldas da Rainha Ladies Open

Lisa Pigato won the title, defeating Gabriela Knutson 6–4, 6–2 in the final.

Polina Iatcenko was the reigning champion, but withdrew before the tournament began.

== Seeds ==
1. (Austria) Sinja Kraus (first round)
2. (Andorra) Victoria Jiménez Kasintseva (second round)
3. (Italy) Lisa Pigato (champion)
4. (Germany) Noma Noha Akugue (second round)
5. (Belgium) Jeline Vandromme (semifinals)
6. (Switzerland) Susan Bandecchi (quarterfinals)
7. (Canada) Kayla Cross (second round, withdrew)
8. (Czech Republic) Gabriela Knutson (final)

== Draw ==
Key

- Q = Qualifier
- WC = Wild card
- LL = Lucky loser
- Alt = Alternate
- ITF = ITF entry
- PR = Protected ranking
- SR = Special ranking
- SE = Special exempt
- JE = Junior exempt
- JR = Junior Accelerator Programme entrant
- CO = College Accelerator Programme entrant
- NG = Next Gen Accelerator Program entrant
- w/o = Walkover
- r = Retired
- d = Defaulted

=== Finals ===
Semifinals
(Slovakia) Mia Pohánková	5	7	3
8	(Czech Republic) Gabriela Knutson	7	5	6
3	(Italy) Lisa Pigato	6	7
5	(Belgium) Jeline Vandromme	3	5

Final
8	(Czech Republic) Gabriela Knutson	4	2
3	(Italy) Lisa Pigato	6	6

=== Top half ===
First round
1	(Austria) S Kraus	1	1
(Slovakia) M Pohánková	6	6
(Portugal) M Jorge	6	2	6
A Gasanova	1	6	4
Q	(United States) K Collins	6^{7}	6	6
LL	(Canada) A Arseneault	7^{9}	1	3
WC	(Ukraine) M Nozdrachova	1	0
7	(Canada) K Cross	6	6
4	(Germany) N Noha Akugue	6	6
(United States) A Akli	3	0
(Germany) C Werner	2	4
Q	(United States) M Rapolu	6	6
(Australia) E Micic	2	7^{10}	3
(Netherlands) A Koevermans	6	6^{8}	6
(Japan) A Ito	6^{4}	2
8	(Czech Republic) G Knutson	7^{7}	6

Second round
(Slovakia) M Pohánková	6	6
(Portugal) M Jorge	4	1
Q	(United States) K Collins	w/o
7	(Canada) K Cross
4	(Germany) N Noha Akugue	6	3	0
Q	(United States) M Rapolu	4	6	6
(Netherlands) A Koevermans	3	2
8	(Czech Republic) G Knutson	6	6

Quarterfinals
(Slovakia) M Pohánková	7^{7}	6
Q	(United States) K Collins	6^{3}	4
Q	(United States) M Rapolu	2	6	4
8	(Czech Republic) G Knutson	6	1	6

Semifinals
(Slovakia) M Pohánková	5	7	3
8	(Czech Republic) G Knutson	7	5	6

=== Bottom half ===
First round
6	(Switzerland) S Bandecchi	6	7
WC	(Spain) M Martínez Vaquero	4	5
E Andreeva	7^{7}	4	4
(Slovakia) V Hrunčáková	6^{4}	6	6
(Sweden) K Rinaldo Persson	6	7
Q	(Portugal) A Voloshchuk	3	5
WC	(Portugal) S Garakani	0	1
3	(Italy) L Pigato	6	6
5	(Belgium) J Vandromme	6	6
WC	(Portugal) C Tomai	0	0
(Turkey) A Aksu	6	5	5
Q	(Estonia) E Malygina	4	7	7
(Portugal) F Jorge	6	6
(China) X Gao	3	3
(Canada) K Sebov	4	1
2	(Andorra) V Jiménez Kasintseva	6	6

Second round
6	(Switzerland) S Bandecchi	6	6
(Slovakia) V Hrunčáková	3	2
(Sweden) K Rinaldo Persson	2	6	4
3	(Italy) L Pigato	6	2	6
5	(Belgium) J Vandromme	6	4	7
Q	(Estonia) E Malygina	3	6	5
(Portugal) F Jorge	6	4	6
2	(Andorra) V Jiménez Kasintseva	2	6	4

Quarterfinals
6	(Switzerland) S Bandecchi	4	6	4
3	(Italy) L Pigato	6	1	6
5	(Belgium) J Vandromme	6	6^{7}	7
(Portugal) F Jorge	3	7^{9}	5

Semifinals
3	(Italy) L Pigato	6	7
5	(Belgium) J Vandromme	3	5

== Qualifying ==
=== Seeds ===
1. (Estonia) Elena Malygina (qualified)
2. (France) Océane Dodin (first round)
3. (France) Margaux Rouvroy (first round)
4. (Portugal) Angelina Voloshchuk (qualified)
5. (United States) Malaika Rapolu (qualified)
6. (United States) Kylie Collins (qualified)
7. (Canada) Ariana Arseneault (qualifying competition, lucky loser)
8. (Netherlands) Stéphanie Visscher (first round)

=== Qualifiers ===
1. (Estonia) Elena Malygina
2. (United States) Kylie Collins
3. (United States) Malaika Rapolu
4. (Portugal) Angelina Voloshchuk

=== Lucky loser ===
1. (Canada) Ariana Arseneault

=== Qualifying draw ===
==== First qualifier ====
First round
1	(Estonia) Elena Malygina	6	6
WC	(Portugal) Giulia Pereira de Aguiar	0	2
(Australia) Gabriella Da Silva-Fick	6	6^{5}	6
8	(Netherlands) Stéphanie Visscher	4	7^{7}	3

Qualifying competition
1	(Estonia) Elena Malygina	7^{7}	6
(Australia) Gabriella Da Silva-Fick	6^{2}	3

==== Second qualifier ====
First round
2	(France) Océane Dodin	4	7	4
(United States) Reese Brantmeier	6	5	6
Ekaterina Yashina	2	2
6	(United States) Kylie Collins	6	6

Qualifying competition
(United States) Reese Brantmeier	5	3
6	(United States) Kylie Collins	7	6

==== Third qualifier ====
First round
3	(France) Margaux Rouvroy	4	2
(United Kingdom) Sofia Johnson	6	6
(Kazakhstan) Zhibek Kulambayeva	3	2
5	(United States) Malaika Rapolu	6	6

Qualifying competition
(United Kingdom) Sofia Johnson	0	2
5	(United States) Malaika Rapolu	6	6

==== Fourth qualifier ====
First round
4	(Portugal) Angelina Voloshchuk	6	6
WC	(Portugal) Teresa Franco Dias	2	3
(Spain) Georgina García Pérez	2	3
7	(Canada) Ariana Arseneault	6	6

Qualifying competition
4	(Portugal) Angelina Voloshchuk	6	6
7	(Canada) Ariana Arseneault	2	4
