= 2023 Caldas da Rainha Ladies Open =

Tennis tournament

- Date: 18–24 September 2023
- Edition: 4th
- Category: ITF Women's World Tennis Tour
- Prize money: $60,000+H
- Surface: Hard / Outdoor
- Location: Caldas da Rainha, Portugal

Champions

Singles
- (Croatia) Petra Marčinko

Doubles
- (Portugal) Francisca Jorge / (Portugal) Matilde Jorge
| ← 2022 · | Caldas da Rainha Ladies Open | · 2024 → |

The 2023 Caldas da Rainha Ladies Open was a professional tennis tournament played on outdoor hard courts. It was the fourth edition of the tournament which was part of the 2023 ITF Women's World Tennis Tour. It took place in Caldas da Rainha, Portugal between 18 and 24 September 2023.

== Champions ==
=== Singles ===
- (Croatia) Petra Marčinko def. (France) Léolia Jeanjean, 6–4, 6–1

=== Doubles ===
- (Portugal) Francisca Jorge / (Portugal) Matilde Jorge def. (United States) Ashley Lahey / (China) Tian Fangran, 6–1, 2–6, [10–7]

== Singles main draw entrants ==
=== Seeds ===
| Country | Player | Rank^{1} | Seed |
|---|---|---|---|
| BRA | Laura Pigossi | 130 | 1 |
| ESP | Nuria Párrizas Díaz | 135 | 2 |
| FRA | Léolia Jeanjean | 146 | 3 |
| UKR | Daria Snigur | 147 | 4 |
| SUI | Céline Naef | 152 | 5 |
| GBR | Yuriko Miyazaki | 154 | 6 |
| CRO | Petra Marčinko | 170 | 7 |
| FRA | Fiona Ferro | 186 | 8 |

- ^{1} Rankings are as of 11 September 2023.

=== Other entrants ===
The following players received wildcards into the singles main draw:

- (Portugal) Sara Lança
- (Portugal) Carolina Mesquita
- (China) Tian Fangran
- (Portugal) Angelina Voloshchuk

The following players received entry from the qualifying draw:

- (Switzerland) Susan Bandecchi
- (United States) Sara Daavettila
- (Denmark) Olga Helmi
- (France) Amandine Hesse
- (United States) Dalayna Hewitt
- (United States) Ashley Lahey
- (Estonia) Elena Malõgina
- (United Kingdom) Eden Silva

The following player received entry as a lucky loser:

- (India) Riya Bhatia
