= 2025 Caldas da Rainha Ladies Open – Doubles =

Doubles
- 2025 Caldas da Rainha Ladies Open

Final
- Champions: (United Kingdom) Harriet Dart (United Kingdom) Maia Lumsden
- Runners-up: (United Kingdom) Madeleine Brooks; Anastasia Tikhonova
- Score: 6–0, 6–3

Events
Singles	Doubles
← 2024 ·	Caldas da Rainha Ladies Open	· 2026 →

Harriet Dart and Maia Lumsden won the title, defeating Madeleine Brooks and Anastasia Tikhonova in the final, 6–0, 6–3.

Jodie Burrage and Tikhonova were the reigning champions, but Burrage did not participate this year.

== Seeds ==
1. (Netherlands) Isabelle Haverlag / (Netherlands) Eva Vedder (quarterfinals)
2. (United Kingdom) Madeleine Brooks / Anastasia Tikhonova (final)
3. (United Kingdom) Harriet Dart / (United Kingdom) Maia Lumsden (champions)
4. (France) Julie Belgraver / (Canada) Kayla Cross (quarterfinals)

== Draw ==
=== Key ===
- Q = Qualifier
- WC = Wild card
- LL = Lucky loser
- Alt = Alternate
- ITF = ITF entry
- PR = Protected ranking
- SR = Special ranking
- SE = Special exempt
- JE = Junior exempt
- JR = Junior Accelerator Programme entrant
- CO = College Accelerator Programme entrant
- NG = Next Gen Accelerator Program entrant
- w/o = Walkover
- r = Retired
- d = Defaulted

=== Draw ===
First round
1	(Netherlands) I Haverlag (Netherlands) E Vedder	6	4	[10]
WC	(Portugal) I Murta (Portugal) AF Santos	4	6	[8]
(Algeria) I Ibbou (France) T Rakotomanga Rajaonah	4	3
(United States) C Harrison (United States) A Lahey	6	6
3	(United Kingdom) H Dart (United Kingdom) M Lumsden	6	6
(Germany) T Morderger (Germany) Y Morderger	2	1
(Israel) L Glushko (Poland) U Radwańska	6	3	[10]
E Ovcharenko (United Kingdom) E Webley-Smith	4	6	[6]
P Iatcenko (United States) CYS Lee	6	4	[10]
(Portugal) M Jorge (France) A Robbe	1	6	[5]
(France) A Hesse (Canada) K Sebov	2	6^{4}
4	(France) J Belgraver (Canada) K Cross	6	7^{7}
A Korneeva (Croatia) P Marčinko	6	3	[10]
V Diatchenko (Switzerland) N Karamoko	2	6	[6]
(Ukraine) M Kolb (Ukraine) N Kolb	5	6^{5}
2	(United Kingdom) M Brooks; A Tikhonova	7	7^{7}

Quarterfinals
1	(Netherlands) I Haverlag (Netherlands) E Vedder	6^{4}	4
(United States) C Harrison (United States) A Lahey	7^{7}	6
3	(United Kingdom) H Dart (United Kingdom) M Lumsden	6	6
(Israel) L Glushko (Poland) U Radwańska	1	3
P Iatcenko (United States) CYS Lee	6	3	[10]
4	(France) J Belgraver (Canada) K Cross	3	6	[7]
A Korneeva (Croatia) P Marčinko
2	(United Kingdom) M Brooks; A Tikhonova	w/o

Semifinals
(United States) C Harrison (United States) A Lahey	1	2
3	(United Kingdom) H Dart (United Kingdom) M Lumsden	6	6
P Iatcenko (United States) CYS Lee	4	4
2	(United Kingdom) M Brooks; A Tikhonova	6	6

Final
3	(United Kingdom) H Dart (United Kingdom) M Lumsden	6	6
2	(United Kingdom) M Brooks; A Tikhonova	0	3
