= 2026 Caldas da Rainha Ladies Open – Doubles =

Doubles
- 2026 Caldas da Rainha Ladies Open

Final
- Champions: (Australia) Gabriella Da Silva-Fick (Kazakhstan) Zhibek Kulambayeva
- Runners-up: (India) Rutuja Bhosale (Australia) Elena Micic
- Score: 3–6, 7–6^{(7–5)}, [10–7]

Events
Singles	Doubles
- Caldas da Rainha Ladies Open

Harriet Dart and Maia Lumsden were the reigning champions, but did not participate this year.

Gabriella Da Silva-Fick and Zhibek Kulambayeva won the title, defeating Rutuja Bhosale and Elena Micic 3–6, 7–6^{(7–5)}, [10–7] in the final.

== Seeds ==
1. (Australia) Gabriella Da Silva-Fick / (Kazakhstan) Zhibek Kulambayeva (champions)
2. (United States) Ayana Akli / (Canada) Kayla Cross (withdrew)
3. (United States) Carmen Corley / (United States) Ivana Corley (quarterfinals)
4. (India) Rutuja Bhosale / (Australia) Elena Micic (final)

== Draw ==
Key

- Q = Qualifier
- WC = Wild card
- LL = Lucky loser
- Alt = Alternate
- ITF = ITF entry
- PR = Protected ranking
- SR = Special ranking
- SE = Special exempt
- JE = Junior exempt
- JR = Junior Accelerator Programme entrant
- CO = College Accelerator Programme entrant
- NG = Next Gen Accelerator Program entrant
- w/o = Walkover
- r = Retired
- d = Defaulted

=== Draw ===
First round
1	(Australia) G Da Silva-Fick (Kazakhstan) Z Kulambayeva	6	6
(China) X Gao (Estonia) E Malygina	2	3
(Germany) N Noha Akugue (Bosnia and Herzegovina) A Wagner	4	4
(Slovakia) V Hrunčáková (Austria) S Kraus	6	6
3	(United States) C Corley (United States) I Corley	7	6
WC	(Portugal) T Franco Dias (Spain) M Martínez Vaquero	5	2
(Spain) G García Pérez (Andorra) V Jiménez Kasintseva	4	4
(Czech Republic) G Knutson (Germany) C Werner	6	6
(Canada) A Arseneault (Canada) R Lacasse	4	6	[4]
(United States) K Collins (Portugal) A Voloshchuk	6	4	[10]
(United States) R Brantmeier (United Kingdom) M Brooks	4	6	[7]
4	(India) R Bhosale (Australia) E Micic	6	3	[10]
(Mexico) J Hinojosa Gómez; E Yashina	1	3
(Portugal) F Jorge (Portugal) M Jorge	6	6
(Japan) M Ayukawa (United Kingdom) E Webley-Smith	w/o
2	(United States) A Akli (Canada) K Cross

Quarterfinals
1	(Australia) G Da Silva-Fick (Kazakhstan) Z Kulambayeva	6	6
(Slovakia) V Hrunčáková (Austria) S Kraus	4	4
3	(United States) C Corley (United States) I Corley	6	3	[5]
(Czech Republic) G Knutson (Germany) C Werner	2	6	[10]
(United States) K Collins (Portugal) A Voloshchuk	6	2	[6]
4	(India) R Bhosale (Australia) E Micic	3	6	[10]
(Portugal) F Jorge (Portugal) M Jorge	6	6
(Japan) M Ayukawa (United Kingdom) E Webley-Smith	1	3

Semifinals
1	(Australia) G Da Silva-Fick (Kazakhstan) Z Kulambayeva	6	7^{7}
(Czech Republic) G Knutson (Germany) C Werner	1	6^{0}
4	(India) R Bhosale (Australia) E Micic	6	6
(Portugal) F Jorge (Portugal) M Jorge	3	4

Final
1	(Australia) G Da Silva-Fick (Kazakhstan) Z Kulambayeva	3	7^{7}	[10]
4	(India) R Bhosale (Australia) E Micic	6	6^{5}	[7]
