= 2023 Caldas da Rainha Ladies Open – Doubles =

Doubles
- 2023 Caldas da Rainha Ladies Open

Final
- Champions: (Portugal) Francisca Jorge (Portugal) Matilde Jorge
- Runners-up: (United States) Ashley Lahey (China) Tian Fangran
- Score: 6–1, 2–6, [10–7]

Events
Singles	Doubles
← 2022 ·	Caldas da Rainha Ladies Open	· 2024 →

Adriana Reami and Anna Rogers were the defending champions but they chose not to participate.

Francisca Jorge and Matilde Jorge won the title, defeating Ashley Lahey and Tian Fangran in the final, 6–1, 2–6, [10–7].

== Seeds ==
1. (United Kingdom) Freya Christie / (Czech Republic) Renata Voráčová (first round)
2. (Portugal) Francisca Jorge / (Portugal) Matilde Jorge (champions)
3. (United Kingdom) Sarah Beth Grey / (United Kingdom) Eden Silva (semifinals)
4. (Uzbekistan) Nigina Abduraimova / (Estonia) Elena Malõgina (first round)

== Draw ==
=== Key ===
- Q = Qualifier
- WC = Wild card
- LL = Lucky loser
- Alt = Alternate
- SE = Special exempt
- PR = Protected ranking
- ITF = ITF entry
- JE = Junior exempt
- w/o = Walkover
- r = Retired
- d = Defaulted
- SR = Special ranking

=== Draw ===
First round
1	(United Kingdom) F Christie (Czech Republic) R Voráčová	3	4
(Ukraine) M Kolb (Ukraine) N Kolb	6	6
WC	(Portugal) T Franco Dias (Portugal) C Mesquita	0	4
(Germany) K Kanev (France) M Rouvroy	6	6
4	(Uzbekistan) N Abduraimova (Estonia) E Malõgina	2	4
(United States) A Lahey (China) F Tian	6	6
(Hungary) T Babos (Poland) U Radwańska	6	6
(Croatia) L Bošković (Slovakia) K Strešnaková	3	4
(France) L Jeanjean (Brazil) L Pigossi	6	6
WC	(Portugal) P Gui (Ukraine) M Nozdrachova	1	0
(Spain) E Guerrero Álvarez (India) V Shinde	1	0
3	(United Kingdom) SB Grey (United Kingdom) E Silva	6	6
(Georgia (country)) M Bolkvadze (United Kingdom) Y Miyazaki	4	6	[10]
(United Kingdom) M Brooks (United Kingdom) H Hutchinson	6	4	[5]
WC	(Portugal) S Lança (Portugal) A Voloshchuk	1	5
2	(Portugal) F Jorge (Portugal) M Jorge	6	7

Quarterfinals
(Ukraine) M Kolb (Ukraine) N Kolb	7	6
(Germany) K Kanev (France) M Rouvroy	5	1
(United States) A Lahey (China) F Tian	6	6
(Hungary) T Babos (Poland) U Radwańska	1	4
(France) L Jeanjean (Brazil) L Pigossi	6	4	[8]
3	(United Kingdom) SB Grey (United Kingdom) E Silva	2	6	[10]
(Georgia (country)) M Bolkvadze (United Kingdom) Y Miyazaki	6	3	[5]
2	(Portugal) F Jorge (Portugal) M Jorge	2	6	[10]

Semifinals
(Ukraine) M Kolb (Ukraine) N Kolb	7^{9}	3	[6]
(United States) A Lahey (China) F Tian	6^{7}	6	[10]
3	(United Kingdom) SB Grey (United Kingdom) E Silva	4	4
2	(Portugal) F Jorge (Portugal) M Jorge	6	6

Final
(United States) A Lahey (China) F Tian	1	6	[7]
2	(Portugal) F Jorge (Portugal) M Jorge	6	2	[10]
