= 2024 Caldas da Rainha Ladies Open – Singles =

Singles
- 2024 Caldas da Rainha Ladies Open

Final
- Champion: Alina Korneeva
- Runner-up: Anastasia Zakharova
- Score: 6–1, 6–4

Events
Singles	Doubles
← 2023 ·	Caldas da Rainha Ladies Open	· 2025 →

Petra Marčinko was the defending champion but chose not to participate.

Alina Korneeva won the title, defeating Anastasia Zakharova in the final, 6–1, 6–4.

== Seeds ==
1. (Croatia) Petra Martić (quarterfinals, retired)
2. (Ukraine) Daria Snigur (quarterfinals)
3. (United States) Ann Li (second round)
4. Anastasia Zakharova (final)
5. (United Kingdom) Lily Miyazaki (first round)
6. (Croatia) Antonia Ružić (first round, retired)
7. (Germany) Mona Barthel (quarterfinals)
8. (Italy) Lucrezia Stefanini (second round)

== Draw ==
=== Key ===
- Q = Qualifier
- WC = Wild card
- LL = Lucky loser
- Alt = Alternate
- SE = Special exempt
- PR = Protected ranking
- ITF = ITF entry
- JE = Junior exempt
- w/o = Walkover
- r = Retired
- d = Defaulted
- SR = Special ranking

=== Finals ===
Semifinals
Alina Korneeva	4	6	6
(Portugal) Francisca Jorge	6	3	2
4	Anastasia Zakharova	5
(Israel) Lina Glushko	5^{r}

Final
Alina Korneeva	6	6
4	Anastasia Zakharova	1	4

=== Top half ===
First round
1/WC	(Croatia) P Martić	6	6
(United Kingdom) J Burrage	1	4
(France) M Léonard	0	0^{r}
Q	(Estonia) E Malõgina	6	2
WC	(Portugal) MdC Parreira	1	0
A Korneeva	6	6
(France) M Rouvroy	6	3	1
8	(Italy) L Stefanini	1	6	6
3	(United States) A Li	6	1
Q	(France) A Robbe	1	0^{r}
LL	(Georgia (country)) S Shapatava	1	1
(Portugal) F Jorge	6	6
Q	(Japan) H Kuwata	4	1
(Switzerland) V Ryser	6	6
Q	(Italy) C Rosatello	6	7
5	(United Kingdom) L Miyazaki	2	5

Second round
1/WC	(Croatia) P Martić	4	6	6
Q	(Estonia) E Malõgina	6	3	4
A Korneeva	7^{7}	6
8	(Italy) L Stefanini	6^{3}	4
3	(United States) A Li	1	2
(Portugal) F Jorge	6	6
(Switzerland) V Ryser	7^{7}	5	1
Q	(Italy) C Rosatello	6^{4}	7	6

Quarterfinals
1/WC	(Croatia) P Martić	0^{r}
A Korneeva	0
(Portugal) F Jorge	7^{7}	7^{7}
Q	(Italy) C Rosatello	6^{5}	6^{5}

Semifinals
A Korneeva	4	6	6
(Portugal) F Jorge	6	3	2

=== Bottom half ===
First round
7	(Germany) M Barthel	6^{8}	6	6
Q	(United Kingdom) SB Grey	7^{10}	2	1
Q	V Diatchenko	6	2	3
J Avdeeva	0	6	6
WC	(France) K Mladenovic	2	7	6
(France) H Tan	6	5	3
WC	(Portugal) T Franco Dias	2	4
4	A Zakharova	6	6
6	(Croatia) A Ružić	3	1^{r}
LL	(Germany) M Hodzic	6	4
(Israel) L Glushko	6	6
A Tikhonova	3	3
Q	(Slovakia) R Jamrichová	2	6	4
(Slovakia) V Hrunčáková	6	4	6
Q	A Kubareva	2	3
2	(Ukraine) D Snigur	6	6

Second round
7	(Germany) M Barthel	6	6
J Avdeeva	1	4
WC	(France) K Mladenovic	1	1
4	A Zakharova	6	6
LL	(Germany) M Hodzic	7^{7}	0	4
(Israel) L Glushko	6^{4}	6	6
(Slovakia) V Hrunčáková	2	4
2	(Ukraine) D Snigur	6	6

Quarterfinals
7	(Germany) M Barthel	3	6^{1}
4	A Zakharova	6	7^{7}
(Israel) L Glushko	6	2	6
2	(Ukraine) D Snigur	4	6	2

Semifinals
4	A Zakharova	5
(Israel) L Glushko	5^{r}
