= 2026 Caldas da Rainha Ladies Open =

- Date: 14–20 September
- Edition: 7th
- Category: WTA 125 tournaments
- Prize money: €100,000
- Surface: Hard / Outdoor
- Location: Caldas da Rainha, Portugal

Champions

Singles
- (Italy) Lisa Pigato

Doubles
- (Australia) Gabriella Da Silva-Fick / (Kazakhstan) Zhibek Kulambayeva
- Caldas da Rainha Ladies Open

The 2026 Caldas da Rainha Ladies Open was a professional women's tennis tournament played on outdoor hard courts. It was the seventh edition of the tournament and part of the 2026 WTA 125 tournaments. It took place at the Municipal Tennis Complex in Caldas da Rainha, Portugal, between 14 and 20 September 2026.

== Singles main draw entrants ==
=== Seeds ===
Country	Player	Rank	Seed
AUT	Sinja Kraus	90	1
AND	Victoria Jiménez Kasintseva	120	2
ITA	Lisa Pigato	130	3
GER	Noma Noha Akugue	137	4
BEL	Jeline Vandromme	139	5
SUI	Susan Bandecchi	152	6
CAN	Kayla Cross	162	7
CZE	Gabriela Knutson	184	8

- Rankings are as of 31 August 2026.

=== Other entrants ===
The following players received wildcards into the singles main draw:

- (Portugal) Sana Garakani
- (Spain) María Martínez Vaquero
- (Ukraine) Mariia Nozdrachova
- (Portugal) Carla Tomai

The following players received entry from the qualifying draw:

- (United States) Kylie Collins
- (Estonia) Elena Malygina
- (United States) Malaika Rapolu
- (Portugal) Angelina Voloshchuk

The following player received entry as a lucky loser:

- (Canada) Ariana Arseneault

=== Withdrawals ===
Before the tournament

- Polina Iatcenko → replaced by (Netherlands) Anouk Koevermans
- Alevtina Ibragimova → replaced by (Sweden) Kajsa Rinaldo Persson
- (United Kingdom) Sonay Kartal → replaced by (Portugal) Francisca Jorge
- (Poland) Linda Klimovičová → replaced by (Germany) Caroline Werner
- (Belgium) Greet Minnen → replaced by (Slovakia) Mia Pohánková
- (Japan) Himeno Sakatsume → replaced by (China) Gao Xinyu
- (Germany) Ella Seidel → replaced by (Australia) Elena Micic
- (United Kingdom) Katie Swan → replaced by (Canada) Ariana Arseneault (LL)
- (Uzbekistan) Maria Timofeeva → replaced by (Japan) Aoi Ito
- (Belgium) Hanne Vandewinkel → replaced by (Portugal) Matilde Jorge

During the tournament

- (Canada) Kayla Cross (personal reasons)

== Doubles main-draw entrants ==
=== Seeds ===
Country	Player	Country	Player	Rank	Seed
AUS	Gabriella Da Silva-Fick	KAZ	Zhibek Kulambayeva	278	1
~~USA~~	~~Ayana Akli~~	~~CAN~~	~~Kayla Cross~~	~~286~~	~~2~~
USA	Carmen Corley	USA	Ivana Corley	299	3
IND	Rutuja Bhosale	AUS	Elena Micic	320	4

- Rankings as of 31 August 2026.

=== Other entrants ===
The following pair received a wildcard into the doubles main draw:

- (Portugal) Teresa Franco Dias / (Spain) María Martínez Vaquero

=== Withdrawal ===
During the tournament

- (Canada) Kayla Cross / (United States) Ayana Akli (Cross – personal reasons)

== Champions ==
=== Singles ===
- (Italy) Lisa Pigato def. (Czech Republic) Gabriela Knutson 6–4, 6–2

=== Doubles ===
- (Australia) Gabriella Da Silva-Fick / (Kazakhstan) Zhibek Kulambayeva def. (India) Rutuja Bhosale / (Australia) Elena Micic 3–6, 7–6^{(7–5)}, [10–7]
