= 2023 Caldas da Rainha Ladies Open – Singles =

Singles
- 2023 Caldas da Rainha Ladies Open

Final
- Champion: (Croatia) Petra Marčinko
- Runner-up: (France) Léolia Jeanjean
- Score: 6–4, 6–1

Events
| Singles | Doubles |
| ← 2022 · | Caldas da Rainha Ladies Open | · 2024 → |

Lucrezia Stefanini was the defending champion but chose not to participate.

Petra Marčinko won the title, defeating Léolia Jeanjean in the final, 6–4, 6–1.

== Seeds ==
1. (Brazil) Laura Pigossi (semifinals)
2. (Spain) Nuria Párrizas Díaz (second round, retired)
3. (France) Léolia Jeanjean (final)
4. (Ukraine) Daria Snigur (second round)
5. (Switzerland) Céline Naef (first round)
6. (United Kingdom) Yuriko Miyazaki (first round)
7. (Croatia) Petra Marčinko (champion)
8. (France) Fiona Ferro (second round)

== Draw ==
=== Key ===
- Q = Qualifier
- WC = Wild card
- LL = Lucky loser
- Alt = Alternate
- SE = Special exempt
- PR = Protected ranking
- ITF = ITF entry
- JE = Junior exempt
- w/o = Walkover
- r = Retired
- d = Defaulted
- SR = Special ranking

=== Finals ===
Semifinals
1 | (Brazil) Laura Pigossi | 4 | 4
3 | (France) Léolia Jeanjean | 6 | 6
Alina Korneeva | 6^{6} | 6^{5}
7 | (Croatia) Petra Marčinko | 7^{8} | 7^{7}

Final
3 | (France) Léolia Jeanjean | 4 | 1
7 | (Croatia) Petra Marčinko | 6 | 6

=== Top half ===
First round
1 | (Brazil) L Pigossi | 6 | 6
WC | (China) F Tian | 3 | 0
Q | (United States) D Hewitt | 6 | 6
WC | (Portugal) C Mesquita | 1 | 1
(Hungary) T Babos | 6 | 6
WC | (Portugal) S Lança | 1 | 1
(Uzbekistan) N Abduraimova | 1 | 6 | 6
5 | (Switzerland) C Naef | 6 | 3 | 3
3 | (France) L Jeanjean | 6^{1} | 6 | 7^{7}
(Germany) M Barthel | 7^{7} | 2 | 6^{5}
A Zakharova | 3 | 2
(France) M Rouvroy | 6 | 6
Q | (United States) S Daavettila | 4 | 3
Q | (United Kingdom) E Silva | 6 | 6
(United Kingdom) S Kartal | 6 | 2 | 6
6 | (United Kingdom) Y Miyazaki | 3 | 6 | 4

Second round
1 | (Brazil) L Pigossi | 6 | 7
Q | (United States) D Hewitt | 2 | 5
(Hungary) T Babos | 2 | 7^{7} | 7^{7}
(Uzbekistan) N Abduraimova | 6 | 6^{1} | 6^{3}
3 | (France) L Jeanjean | 6 | 6
(France) M Rouvroy | 2 | 4
Q | (United Kingdom) E Silva | 4 | 2
(United Kingdom) S Kartal | 6 | 6

Quarterfinals
1 | (Brazil) L Pigossi | 6 | 1
(Hungary) T Babos | 2 | 0^{r}
3 | (France) L Jeanjean | 5 | 6 | 6
(United Kingdom) S Kartal | 7 | 3 | 2

Semifinals
1 | (Brazil) L Pigossi | 4 | 4
3 | (France) L Jeanjean | 6 | 6

=== Bottom half ===
First round
8 | (France) F Ferro | 6 | 6
LL | (India) R Bhatia | 1 | 2
Q | (France) A Hesse | 7 | 6
(Portugal) F Jorge | 5 | 4
A Korneeva | 6 | 6
(Croatia) L Bošković | 3 | 4
Q | (Estonia) E Malõgina | 2 | 0
4 | (Ukraine) D Snigur | 6 | 6
7 | (Croatia) P Marčinko | 6 | 6
Q | (United States) A Lahey | 4 | 4
Q | (Denmark) O Helmi | 7 | 4 | 1
M Bondarenko | 5 | 6 | 6
(France) A Robbe | 2 | 7 | 6
WC | (Portugal) A Voloshchuk | 6 | 5 | 1
Q | (Switzerland) S Bandecchi | 4 | 7 | 3
2 | (Spain) N Párrizas Díaz | 6 | 5 | 6

Second round
8 | (France) F Ferro | 6^{4} | 7 | 2
Q | (France) A Hesse | 7^{7} | 5 | 6
A Korneeva | 6 | 6
4 | (Ukraine) D Snigur | 1 | 3
7 | (Croatia) P Marčinko | 6 | 6
M Bondarenko | 3 | 2
(France) A Robbe | 6 | 4
2 | (Spain) N Párrizas Díaz | 4 | 1^{r}

Quarterfinals
Q | (France) A Hesse | 3 | 2
A Korneeva | 6 | 6
7 | (Croatia) P Marčinko | 6 | 6
(France) A Robbe | 3 | 1

Semifinals
A Korneeva | 6^{6} | 6^{5}
7 | (Croatia) P Marčinko | 7^{8} | 7^{7}
