= 2024 Caldas da Rainha Ladies Open – Doubles =

Doubles
- 2024 Caldas da Rainha Ladies Open

Final
- Champions: (United Kingdom) Jodie Burrage; Anastasia Tikhonova
- Runners-up: (Portugal) Francisca Jorge (Portugal) Matilde Jorge
- Score: 7–6^{(7–3)}, 6–4

Events
Singles	Doubles
← 2023 ·	Caldas da Rainha Ladies Open	· 2025 →

Francisca Jorge and Matilde Jorge were the defending champions, but they lost in the final to Jodie Burrage and Anastasia Tikhonova; 7–6^{(7–3)}, 6–4.

== Seeds ==
1. (Brazil) Ingrid Gamarra Martins / (United States) Quinn Gleason (semifinals)
2. (France) Estelle Cascino / (Italy) Camilla Rosatello (quarterfinals)
3. (Portugal) Francisca Jorge / (Portugal) Matilde Jorge (final)
4. (Czech Republic) Jesika Malečková / (Czech Republic) Miriam Škoch (first round)

== Draw ==
=== Key ===
- Q = Qualifier
- WC = Wild card
- LL = Lucky loser
- Alt = Alternate
- ITF = ITF entry
- PR = Protected ranking
- SR = Special ranking
- SE = Special exempt
- JE = Junior exempt
- JR = Junior Accelerator Programme entrant
- CO = College Accelerator Programme entrant
- NG = Next Gen Accelerator Program entrant
- w/o = Walkover
- r = Retired
- d = Defaulted

First round
1	(Brazil) I Gamarra Martins (United States) Q Gleason	6	6
(Croatia) P Martić (Croatia) A Ružić	3	3
WC	(Switzerland) C Perrin (United Kingdom) E Webley-Smith	6	6
WC	(Lithuania) I Dapkutė (Portugal) T Franco Dias	2	1
3	(Portugal) F Jorge (Portugal) M Jorge	6	6
(Spain) Y Cavallé Reimers (Poland) M Kubka	0	2
(France) E Lechemia (France) C Monnet	2	6^{4}
(Czech Republic) A Dețiuc (Slovakia) V Hrunčáková	6	7^{7}
(United Kingdom) J Burrage; A Tikhonova	7	6
(United Kingdom) SB Grey (France) Y Mansouri	5	1
A Charaeva (Israel) L Glushko	6	2	[10]
4	(Czech Republic) J Malečková (Czech Republic) M Škoch	2	6	[8]
(United Kingdom) E Appleton (United Kingdom) L Miyazaki	2	5
V Diatchenko; A Zakharova	6	7
J Avdeeva (Switzerland) V Ryser	6	5	[6]
2	(France) E Cascino (Italy) C Rosatello	4	7	[10]

Quarterfinals
1	(Brazil) I Gamarra Martins (United States) Q Gleason	6	5	[10]
WC	(Switzerland) C Perrin (United Kingdom) E Webley-Smith	0	7	[7]
3	(Portugal) F Jorge (Portugal) M Jorge	6	7
(Czech Republic) A Dețiuc (Slovakia) V Hrunčáková	2	5
(United Kingdom) J Burrage; A Tikhonova	7	6
A Charaeva (Israel) L Glushko	5	2
V Diatchenko; A Zakharova	6	7
2	(France) E Cascino (Italy) C Rosatello	3	5

Semifinals
1	(Brazil) I Gamarra Martins (United States) Q Gleason	2	3
3	(Portugal) F Jorge (Portugal) M Jorge	6	6
(United Kingdom) J Burrage; A Tikhonova	4	7^{7}	[10]
V Diatchenko; A Zakharova	6	6^{5}	[8]

Final
3	(Portugal) F Jorge (Portugal) M Jorge	6^{3}	4
(United Kingdom) J Burrage; A Tikhonova	7^{7}	6
