= Lisa Pigato =

Italian tennis player (born 2003)

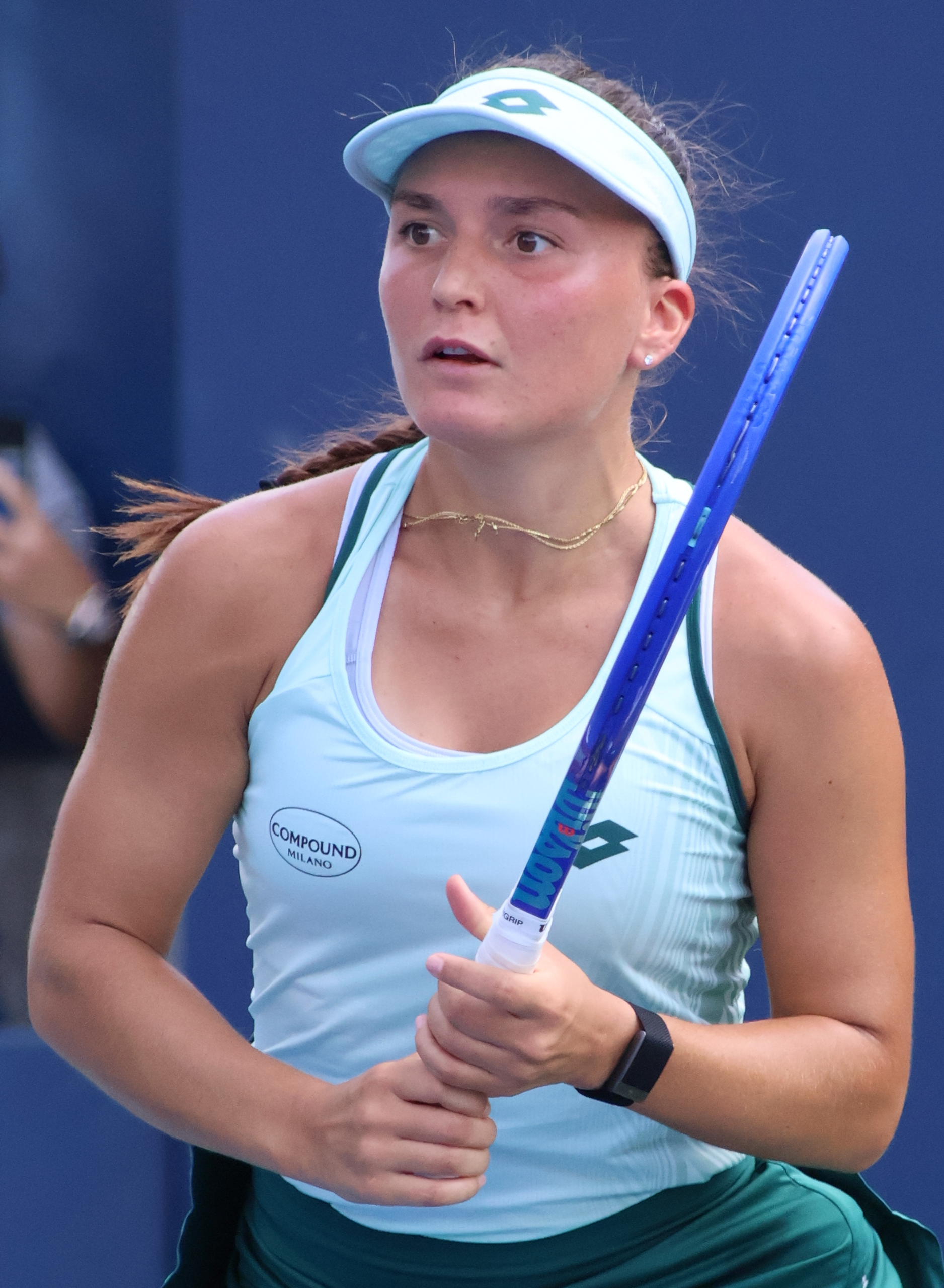
- Pigato at the 2026 US Open
- Country (sports): Italy
- Born: 21 June 2003 (age 23)
- Plays: Right-handed
- Prize money: $357,094

Singles
- Career record: 237–149
- Career titles: 2 WTA 125
- Highest ranking: No. 102 (26 October 2026)
- Current ranking: No. 102 (26 October 2026)

Grand Slam singles results
- French Open: Q2 (2026)
- Wimbledon: Q1 (2026)
- US Open: Q1 (2026)

Doubles
- Career record: 103–73
- Career titles: 9 ITF
- Highest ranking: No. 187 (18 July 2022)
- Current ranking: No. 897 (26 October 2026)
- Last updated on: 26 October 2026.

Lisa Pigato (born 21 June 2003) is an Italian tennis player. She has a career-high singles ranking by the WTA of 102, achieved on 26 October 2026, and a best doubles ranking of world No. 187, reached on 18 July 2022. Pigato has won two WTA 125 singles titles. Additionally she won nine singles titles and nine in doubles on the ITF Women's Circuit.

== Juniors ==
Partnering with Eleonora Alvisi, Pigato won the 2020 French Open girls' doubles, when they defeated the Russian pair of Maria Bondarenko and Diana Shnaider in the final.

=== Grand Slam performance ===
Singles

- Australian Open: 3R (2019)
- French Open: 1R (2021)
- Wimbledon: Q1 (2019)
- US Open: Q1 (2018)

Doubles

- Australian Open: 1R (2019, 2020)
- French Open: W (2020)
- Wimbledon: –
- US Open: –

== Professional ==
=== 2021–2025: WTA Tour debut ===
Pigato made her WTA Tour main-draw debut at the 2021 Emilia-Romagna Open in Parma where she won two qualifying matches, before losing to the top seed, Serena Williams, in the first round.

Given a wildcard entry, she made her WTA 1000 main-draw debut at the 2023 Italian Open defeating Diletta Cherubini, before losing to eighth seed Daria Kasatkina in the second round.

Again having received a wildcard into the 2024 Italian Open, Pigato was defeated in the first round by Shelby Rogers.

=== 2026: First WTA 125 titles ===
Pigato won her first WTA 125 title at the Open Villa de Madrid by defeating Marina Bassols Ribera in the final. She claimed her second WTA 125 title at the Caldas da Rainha Ladies Open, overcoming Gabriela Knutson in the final. As a result, she reached a new career-high ranking of world No. 113, on 21 September 2026.

== WTA 125 finals ==
=== Singles: 2 (2 titles) ===
Result	W–L	Date	Tournament	Surface	Opponent	Score
Win	1–0	Apr 2026	Open Villa de Madrid, Spain	Clay	(Spain) Marina Bassols Ribera	6–4, 6–0
Win	2–0	Sep 2026	Caldas da Rainha Open, Portugal	Hard	(Czech Republic) Gabriela Knutson	6-4, 6-2

== ITF Circuit finals ==
=== Singles: 14 (9 titles, 5 runner-ups) ===
Legend W75 tournaments (2–2) W25/35 tournaments (3–3) W15 tournaments (4–0)	Finals by surface Clay (6–3) Carpet (1–1) Hard (2–1)

Result	W–L	Date	Tournament	Tier	Surface	Opponent	Score
Win	1–0	Sep 2019	ITF Tabarka, Tunisia	W15	Clay	(Russia) Anna Ureke	6–0, 2–0 ret.
Win	2–0	Nov 2019	ITF Heraklion, Greece	W15	Clay	(Italy) Melania Delai	w/o
Win	3–0	Mar 2022	ITF Antalya, Turkey	W15	Clay	(Turkey) İlay Yörük	6–2, 3–6, 3–1 ret.
Win	4–0	Oct 2023	ITF Solarino, Italy	W25	Carpet	(Italy) Dalila Spiteri	1–6, 6–2, 6–3
Loss	4–1	Nov 2023	ITF Solarino, Italy	W25	Carpet	(Czech Republic) Linda Klimovičová	2–6, 3–6
Loss	4–2	Apr 2024	ITF Santa Margherita di Pula, Italy	W35	Clay	(Spain) Andrea Lázaro García	6–7^{(4)}, 3–6
Win	5–2	Mar 2025	ITF Gonesse, France	W15	Clay (i)	(France) Thessy Ntondele Zinga	6–1, 6–4
Loss	5–3	Sep 2025	ITF Santa Margherita di Pula, Italy	W35	Clay	(Sweden) Caijsa Hennemann	5–7, 2–6
Win	6–3	Oct 2025	ITF Santa Margherita di Pula, Italy	W35	Clay	(Italy) Giorgia Pedone	6–1, 6–4
Loss	6–4	Jan 2026	ITF Nonthaburi, Thailand	W75	Hard	(Thailand) Mananchaya Sawangkaew	1–6, 4–6
Win	7–4	Jan 2026	ITF Nonthaburi, Thailand	W75	Hard	(Japan) Hiromi Abe	6–4, 6–7^{(6)}, 6–2
Win	8–4	Mar 2026	ITF San Gregorio, Italy	W35	Clay	(France) Alice Tubello	6–2, 6–4
Loss	8–5	Apr 2026	Chiasso Open, Switzerland	W75	Clay	(Uzbekistan) Maria Timofeeva	2–6, 3–6
Win	9–5	Sep 2026	The Campus Open, Portugal	W75	Hard	(Netherlands) Eva Vedder	1–6, 6–0, 6–3

=== Doubles: 16 (9 titles, 7 runner-ups) ===
Legend W60 tournaments (2–0) W40 tournaments (0–1) W25 tournaments (6–4) W15 tournaments (1–2)	Finals by surface Hard (1–2) Clay (7–4) Carpet (1–1)

Result	W–L	Date	Tournament	Tier	Surface	Partner	Opponents	Score
Loss	0–1	Jul 2019	ITF Schio, Italy	W15	Clay	(Italy) Matilde Paoletti	(Colombia) Yuliana Lizarazo (Italy) Aurora Zantedeschi	3–6, 6–1, [5–10]
Loss	0–2	Sep 2020	ITF Trieste, Italy	W15	Clay	(Italy) Melania Delai	(Colombia) Yuliana Lizarazo (Italy) Aurora Zantedeschi	2–6, 3–6
Win	1–2	Dec 2020	ITF Selva Gardena, Italy	W25	Hard (i)	(Italy) Matilde Paoletti	(Poland) Maja Chwalińska (Czech Republic) Linda Fruhvirtová	7–5, 6–1
Win	2–2	Sep 2021	ITF Jablonec nad Nisou, Czech Republic	W25	Clay	(Romania) Andreea Roșca	(Japan) Mana Kawamura (Japan) Funa Kozaki	3–6, 6–3, [10–7]
Loss	2–3	Jan 2022	ITF Monastir, Tunisia	W25	Hard	(Italy) Nuria Brancaccio	(Hong Kong) Eudice Chong (Hong Kong) Cody Wong	2–6, 3–6
Loss	2–4	May 2022	ITF Santa Margherita di Pula, Italy	W25	Clay	(Italy) Martina Colmegna	(Portugal) Francisca Jorge (Portugal) Matilde Jorge	5–7, 6–0, [9–11]
Win	3–4	May 2022	Rome Cup, Italy	W60	Clay	(Italy) Matilde Paoletti	Darya Astakhova (Latvia) Daniela Vismane	6–3, 7–6^{(7)}
Win	4–4	June 2022	Internazionali di Brescia, Italy	W60	Clay	(Italy) Nuria Brancaccio	(Kazakhstan) Zhibek Kulambayeva (Latvia) Diāna Marcinkēviča	6–4, 6–1
Loss	4–5	Oct 2022	ITF Santa Margherita di Pula	W25	Clay	(Italy) Angelica Moratelli	Amina Anshba (Romania) Oana Georgeta Simion	3–6, 1–6
Loss	4–6	Jan 2023	ITF Tallinn, Estonia	W40	Hard (i)	(Italy) Deborah Chiesa	(Czech Republic) Lucie Havlíčková (Czech Republic) Dominika Šalková	5–7, 6–4, [11–13]
Win	5–6	Sep 2023	ITF Varna, Bulgaria	W25	Clay	(Latvia) Daniela Vismane	(Romania) Karola Patricia Bejenaru (France) Yasmine Mansouri	7–6^{(4)}, 7–5
Win	6–6	Oct 2023	ITF Santa Margherita di Pula	W25	Clay	(Italy) Martina Colmegna	(Slovenia) Nika Radišić (Bosnia and Herzegovina) Anita Wagner	6–4, 7–5
Loss	6–7	Oct 2023	ITF Solarino, Italy	W25	Carpet	(Italy) Giorgia Pedone	(United States) Jessie Aney (Germany) Lena Papadakis	3–6, 6–3, [6–10]
Win	7–7	Nov 2023	ITF Solarino, Italy	W25	Carpet	(Italy) Angelica Moratelli	(Georgia (country)) Sofia Shapatava (United Kingdom) Emily Webley-Smith	6–3, 6–4
Win	8–7	Feb 2025	ITF Antalya, Turkey	W15	Clay	(Italy) Vittoria Paganetti	(Slovenia) Živa Falkner (Japan) Yuki Naito	6–3, 6–4
Win	9–7	Jun 2025	ITF Klosters, Switzerland	W35	Clay	(Italy) Deborah Chiesa	(Netherlands) Jasmijn Gimbrère (United States) Ashley Lahey	6–0, 3–6, [10–6]

=== Junior Grand Slam tournament finals ===
==== Doubles: 1 (title) ====
Result	Year	Tournament	Surface	Partner	Opponents	Score
Win	2020	French Open	Clay	(Italy) Eleonora Alvisi	(Russia) Maria Bondarenko (Russia) Diana Shnaider	7–6^{(3)}, 6–4
