= Gabriella Da Silva-Fick =

Australian tennis player (born 2000)

- Country (sports): Australia
- Residence: Collaroy, Sydney, New South Wales
- Born: 23 August 2000 (age 26) South Africa
- Turned pro: 2016
- Plays: Right-handed (two-handed backhand)
- Prize money: $136,321

Singles
- Career record: 190–175
- Career titles: 1 ITF
- Highest ranking: No. 368 (17 March 2025)
- Current ranking: No. 704 (9 November 2026)

Grand Slam singles results
- Australian Open: Q1 (2019)

Doubles
- Career record: 0–129
- Career titles: 1 WTA 125, 10 ITF
- Highest ranking: No. 139 (9 November 2026)
- Current ranking: No. 139 (9 November 2026)

Grand Slam mixed doubles results
- Australian Open: 1R (2026)
- Last updated on: 9 November 2026.

Gabriella Da Silva-Fick (born 23 August 2000) is an Australian tennis player. She has a career-high singles ranking of 368, reached on 17 March 2025, and a best doubles ranking of world No. 139, achieved on 9 November 2026. Da Silva-Fick has won one WTA 125 title in doubles.

== Career ==
=== 2016–20: ITF tournaments ===
Da Silva-Fick made her debut on the ITF Circuit in March 2016, scoring her first win in Kaltenkirchen, Germany in June 2017. In January 2019, she lost in the first round of the Australian Open qualifying. In June 2019, she won her first ITF doubles title in Kaltenkirchen.

=== 2021: WTA Tour debut ===
In February, Da Silva-Fick made her WTA Tour main-draw debut at the Phillip Island Trophy, where she played in both the singles and doubles main draws. She achieved her first WTA Tour main-draw win, defeating 92nd ranked Aliaksandra Sasnovich as a lucky loser, in the second round. Da Silva-Fick lost in the third round to 13th seed Marie Bouzková.

=== 2026: First WTA 125 title ===
Teaming with Zhibek Kulambayeva, Da Silva-Fick won her maiden WTA 125 title in doubles at the Caldas da Rainha Ladies Open, defeating Rutuja Bhosale and Elena Micic in the final. As a result she broke into the top 150 in the WTA doubles rankings at world No. 148 on 21 September 2026.

== WTA 125 finals ==
=== Doubles: 1 (1 title) ===
Result	W–L	Date	Tournament	Surface	Partner	Opponents	Score
Win	1–0	Sep 2026	Caldas da Rainha Ladies Open, Portugal	Hard	(Kazakhstan) Zhibek Kulambayeva	(Australia) Elena Micic (India) Rutuja Bhosale	3–6, 7–6^{(5)},[10–7]

== ITF Circuit finals ==
=== Singles: 1 (title) ===
Legend
W35 tournaments

Result	W–L	Date	Tournament	Tier	Surface	Opponent	Score
Win	1–0	Mar 2024	ITF Swan Hill, Australia	W35	Grass	(Australia) Emerson Jones	3–6, 6–3, 6–1

=== Doubles: 22 (10 titles, 12 runner-ups) ===
Legend
W75 tournaments
W40/50 tournaments
W25/35 tournaments
W15 tournaments

Result	W–L	Date	Tournament	Tier	Surface	Partner	Opponents	Score
Loss	0–1	Jun 2017	ITF Kaltenkirchen, Germany	W15	Clay	(Belgium) Magali Kempen	(Uzbekistan) Albina Khabibulina (Germany) Lisa Ponomar	4–6, 0–6
Win	1–1	Jun 2019	ITF Kaltenkirchen, Germany	W15	Clay	(Germany) Anna Klasen	(Uzbekistan) Albina Khabibulina (Romania) Oana Georgeta Simion	6–4, 7–5
Win	2–1	Jun 2019	ITF Alkmaar, Netherlands	W15	Clay	(United Kingdom) Emily Arbuthnott	(Netherlands) Eva Vedder (Netherlands) Stéphanie Visscher	6–4, 1–6, [10–8]
Loss	2–2	Jul 2019	ITF Den Haag, Netherlands	W25	Clay	(Germany) Anna Klasen	(Greece) Valentini Grammatikopoulou (Netherlands) Quirine Lemoine	2–6, 7–5, [3–10]
Loss	2–3	Mar 2022	ITF Bendigo, Australia	W25	Hard	(Australia) Alana Parnaby	(Australia) Jaimee Fourlis (Australia) Ellen Perez	1–6, 1–6
Loss	2–4	May 2022	ITF Heraklion, Greece	W15	Clay	(Netherlands) Stéphanie Visscher	(Greece) Michaela Laki (Serbia) Lola Radivojević	1–6, 6–4, [8–10]
Win	3–4	Jun 2022	ITF Heraklion, Greece	W15	Clay	(Greece) Eleni Christofi	(Ukraine) Mariia Bergen (Bulgaria) Beatris Spasova	6–0, 6–1
Win	4–4	May 2023	Torneo Conchita Martínez, Spain	W25	Hard	(Luxembourg) Marie Weckerle	(Spain) Georgina García Pérez (Spain) Laura García Astudillo	6–2, 6–1
Loss	4–5	May 2023	ITF Setúbal, Portugal	W25	Hard	(Australia) Petra Hule	(Australia) Elysia Bolton (Australia) Alexandra Bozovic	7–6^{(6)}, 6–7^{(3)}, [8–10]
Win	5–5	Jul 2023	ITF Porto, Portugal	W40	Hard	(Australia) Alexandra Osborne	(Portugal) Francisca Jorge (Portugal) Matilde Jorge	6–4, 6–3
Loss	5–6	Jul 2024	ITF Roehampton, United Kingdom	W35	Hard	(France) Alice Robbe	(United Kingdom) Holly Hutchinson (United Kingdom) Ella McDonald	2–6, 6–3, [3–10]
Loss	5–7	Feb 2025	Burnie International, Australia	W35	Hard	(Australia) Belle Thompson	(New Zealand) Monique Barry (Australia) Elena Micic	3–6, 4–6
Win	6–7	Mar 2025	ITF Mildura, Australia	W35	Grass	(Australia) Lizette Cabrera	(Australia) Alicia Smith (Australia) Belle Thompson	2–6, 6–3, [12–10]
Loss	6–8	Aug 2025	ITF Tweed Heads, Australia	W15	Hard	(Australia) Monique Barry	(Australia) Catherine Aulia (Australia) Lily Fairclough	6–2, 4–6, [9–11]
Win	7–8	Aug 2025	ITF Tweed Heads, Australia	W15	Hard	(Australia) Monique Barry	(Australia) Alana Subasic (Australia) Belle Thompson	6–4, 6–1
Win	8–8	Sep 2025	ITF Darwin, Australia	W35	Hard	(Australia) Monique Barry	(United Kingdom) Brooke Black (Japan) Reina Goto	6–3, 7–6^{(7)}
Loss	8–9	Nov 2025	Queensland International, Australia	W50	Hard	(Australia) Tenika McGiffin	(Australia) Destanee Aiava (Australia) Maddison Inglis	6–7^{(3)}, 6–7^{(7)}
Loss	8–10	Feb 2026	Queensland International, Australia	W75	Hard	(Australia) Tenika McGiffin	(Japan) Natsumi Kawaguchi (Japan) Sara Saito	2–6, 4–6
Win	9–10	Feb 2026	Burnie International, Australia	W35	Hard	(Australia) Tenika McGiffin	(New Zealand) Monique Barry (Australia) Alexandra Osborne	6–4, 6–3
Loss	9–11	Mar 2026	Launceston International, Australia	W35	Hard	(Australia) Tenika McGiffin	(Japan) Kyōka Okamura (Japan) Naho Sato	7–5, 5–7, [12–14]
Loss	9–12	May 2026	Kurume Cup, Japan	W75	Carpet	(Australia) Tenika McGiffin	(Chinese Taipei) Lee Ya-hsin (China) Ye Qiuyu	3–6, 2–6
Win	10–12	Jul 2026	ITF Darmstadt, Germany	W50	Hard	(Australia) Tenika McGiffin	(Egypt) Sandra Samir (Germany) Joëlle Steur	7–5, 7–6^{(4)}
