= Novopodkletnoye =

Novopodkletnoye Новоподклетное
- Village
- Location within Voronezh Oblast Location within Russia
- Coordinates: 51°46′N 39°07′E
- Country: Russia
- Region: Voronezh Oblast
- District: Ramonsky District
- Time zone: UTC+3:00

Novopodkletnoye (Russian: Новоподклетное) is a rural locality (a village) in Yamenskoye Rural Settlement, Ramonsky District, Voronezh Oblast, Russia. The population was 493 as of 2010. There are 147 streets.

== Geography ==
Novopodkletnoye is located 33 km southwest of Ramon (the district's administrative centre) by road. Pervozvanny is the nearest rural locality.
