= Polina Iatcenko =

Russian tennis player (born 2003)

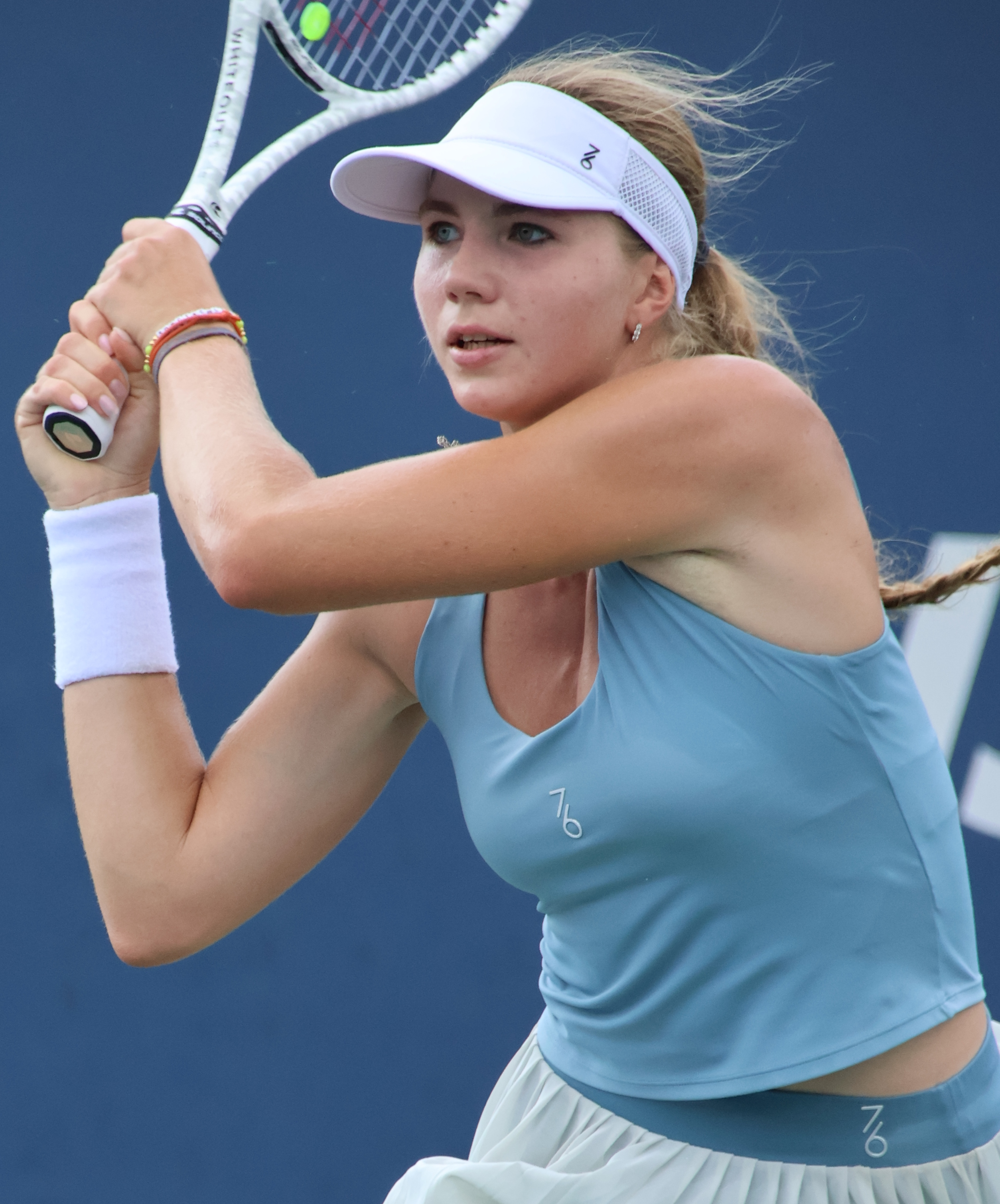
- Iatcenko at the 2026 US Open
- Full name: Polina Vyacheslavovna Iatcenko
- Country (sports): Russia
- Residence: Voronezh, Russia
- Born: 10 December 2003 (age 22) Murmansk, Russia
- Height: 173 cm (5 ft 8 in)
- Turned pro: 2021
- Plays: Right-handed
- Coach: Ivan Kobzar
- Prize money: $273,891

Singles
- Career record: 192–103
- Career titles: 1 WTA 125
- Highest ranking: No. 146 (20 July 2026)
- Current ranking: No. 149 (27 July 2026)

Grand Slam singles results
- Australian Open: Q1 (2026)
- French Open: Q1 (2026)
- Wimbledon: Q3 (2026)
- US Open: 2R (2026)

Doubles
- Career record: 98–54
- Career titles: 1 WTA 125
- Highest ranking: No. 178 (16 February 2026)
- Current ranking: No. 189 (27 July 2026)
- Last updated on: 28 July 2026.

Polina Vyacheslavovna Iatcenko (Russian: Полина Вячеславовна Яценко, born 10 December 2003) is a Russian tennis player. She has a career-high singles ranking of world No. 146, achieved on 20 July 2026, and best doubles ranking of No. 178, reached on 16 February 2026.

== Early life ==
Iatcenko was born on 10 December 2003 in Murmansk. Later, she moved with her family to the village of Novopodkletnoye in the Ramonsky District of the Voronezh Region. Iatcenko started playing tennis with the support of her family at the age of eight. In addition to her native Russian, she speaks fluent English.

== Career ==
In February 2022, she won the silver medal at the Russian Cup in doubles with partner Elena Pridankina. They lost to Ksenia Laskutova and Maria Timofeeva in the final. In September 2022, she won a singles title in Sharm El Sheikh defeating Jacqueline Cabaj Awad in the final in straight sets. In March 2023, she won a singles title at Sharm El Sheikh defeating Katarína Kužmová in the final, and at the same venue that month won a doubles title alongside Kužmová in women's doubles.

In August 2023, she won the title by defeating Aliona Falei in the President's Cup final held in Astana, Kazakhstan.

In January 2024, she lost to Croatian Lucija Ćirić Bagarić in the final of a W25 tournament in Monastir, Tunisia.

Playing alongside Riya Bhatia, she reached the final of the women’s doubles at the W50 tournament in Funchal, Portugal, in November 2024 where they lost to British pair Ella McDonald and Holly Hutchinson. In March 2025, she reached the doubles final at the W35 tournament in Gurugram, India, with her partner Mariia Tkacheva.

In April 2025, she became the champion in singles and was runner-up in doubles at the W35 tournament held in Sharm El Sheikh, Egypt.

In June 2025, Iatcenko won her first major title in doubles at the W50 tournament in Montemor-o-Novo, Portugal, with her Belarusian partner Aliona Falei.

In September 2025, she won her first WTA 125 title at the Caldas da Rainha Open, defeating Gabriela Knutson in the final.

Iatcenko made her WTA Tour debut at the 2025 Chennai Open, recording wins over Alina Charaeva via retirement and Katarzyna Kawa to reach the quarterfinals, at which point her run was ended by Lanlana Tararudee.

Having come through the qualifying rounds, Iatcenko defeated Renata Zarazua in August 2026 in the US Open main draw first round, coming from behind to win in three sets. In the second round she was defeated by top seed Aryna Sabalenka.

== WTA 125 finals ==
=== Singles: 1 (title) ===
Result	W–L	Date	Tournament	Surface	Opponent	Score
Win	1–0	Sep 2025	Caldas da Rainha Open, Portugal	Hard	(Czech Republic) Gabriela Knutson	6–2, 5–7, 6–2

=== Doubles: 1 (title) ===
Result	W–L	Date	Tournament	Surface	Partner	Opponents	Score
Win	1–0	Feb 2026	Mumbai Open, India	Hard	Elena Pridankina	(Argentina) Nicole Fossa Huergo (Thailand) Mananchaya Sawangkaew	7–6^{(3)}, 1–6, [10–5]

== ITF Circuit finals ==
=== Singles: 10 (9 titles, 1 runner-up) ===
Legend W50 tournaments (2–0) W25/35 tournaments (2–1) W15 tournaments (5–0)	Finals by surface Hard (8–1) Grass (1–0)

Result	W–L	Date	Tournament	Tier	Surface	Opponent	Score
Win	1–0	Feb 2022	ITF Sharm El Sheikh, Egypt	W15	Hard	Darya Shauha	w/o
Win	2–0	Sep 2022	ITF Sharm El Sheikh, Egypt	W15	Hard	(Sweden) Jacqueline Cabaj Awad	7–6^{(6)}, 6–2
Win	3–0	Oct 2022	ITF Sharm El Sheikh, Egypt	W15	Hard	(New Zealand) Vivian Yang	6–1, 6–1
Win	4–0	Mar 2023	ITF Sharm El Sheikh, Egypt	W15	Hard	(Slovakia) Katarína Kužmová	6–4, 6–2
Win	5–0	Mar 2023	ITF Sharm El Sheikh, Egypt	W15	Hard	(United Kingdom) Emilie Lindh	6–2, 2–2 ret.
Win	6–0	Jul 2023	President's Cup, Kazakhstan	W25	Hard	Aliona Falei	6–3, 6–3
Loss	6–1	Jan 2024	ITF Monastir, Tunisia	W35	Hard	(Croatia) Lucija Ćirić Bagarić	5–7, 2–6
Win	7–1	Apr 2025	ITF Sharm El Sheikh, Egypt	W35	Hard	(Slovakia) Viktória Hrunčáková	6–2, 6–2
Win	8–1	Aug 2025	ITF Ourense, Spain	W50	Hard	(United States) Carol Young Suh Lee	6–2, 6–2
Win	9–1	Jun 2026	ITF Hurghada, Egypt	W50	Grass	(Poland) Martyna Kubka	6–4, 6–3

=== Doubles: 16 (8 titles, 8 runner-ups) ===
Legend W75 tournaments (0–1) W50 tournaments (2–1) W25/35 tournaments (3–4) W15 tournaments (3–2)	Finals by surface Hard (7–8) Grass (1–0)

Result	W–L	Date	Tournament	Tier	Surface	Partner	Opponents	Score
Loss	0–1	Jan 2022	ITF Kazan, Russia	W15	Hard	Daria Kudashova	Anna Ukolova; Kseniya Yersh	7–6^{(0)}, 3–6, [7–10]
Loss	0–2	Mar 2022	ITF Sharm El Sheikh, Egypt	W15	Hard	Darya Shauha	(Chinese Taipei) Lee Pei-chi (Chinese Taipei) Lee Ya-hsin	3–6, 0–6
Win	1–2	Nov 2022	ITF Sharm El Sheikh	W25	Hard	Alina Korneeva	(Switzerland) Jenny Dürst (South Korea) Park So-hyun	6–1, 6–7^{(1)}, [10–5]
Win	2–2	Mar 2023	ITF Sharm El Sheikh	W15	Hard	(Egypt) Sandra Samir	(South Korea) Back Da-yeon (South Korea) Jeong Bo-young	6–4, 7–5
Win	3–2	Mar 2023	ITF Sharm El Sheikh	W15	Hard	(Slovakia) Katarína Kužmová	(France) Pauline Courcoux (France) Camille Moga	6–4, 6–0
Win	4–2	Apr 2023	ITF Sharm El Sheikh	W15	Hard	Aliona Falei	Evgeniya Burdina; Ekaterina Shalimova	6–4, 7–5
Loss	4–3	Oct 2023	ITF Monastir, Tunisia	W25	Hard	Aliona Falei	(China) Gao Xinyu (Kazakhstan) Zhibek Kulambayeva	0–6, 6–2, [7–10]
Win	5–3	Nov 2023	ITF Limassol, Cyprus	W25	Hard	Anastasiia Gureva	(United Kingdom) Katy Dunne (Switzerland) Leonie Küng	walkover
Loss	5–4	Nov 2024	ITF Funchal, Portugal	W50	Hard	(India) Riya Bhatia	(United Kingdom) Holly Hutchinson (United Kingdom) Ella McDonald	6–3, 2–6, [8–10]
Loss	5–5	Nov 2024	ITF Lousada, Portugal	W35	Hard (i)	(Belgium) Hanne Vandewinkel	Yuliya Hatouka (Kazakhstan) Zhibek Kulambayeva	3–6, 6–1, [4–10]
Win	6–5	Dec 2024	ITF Sharm El Sheikh, Egypt	W35	Hard	(Slovakia) Katarína Kužmová	(Latvia) Kamilla Bartone (Romania) Andreea Prisăcariu	6–4, 6–4
Loss	6–6	Mar 2025	ITF Gurugram, India	W35	Hard	Mariia Tkacheva	Ekaterina Makarova; Ekaterina Reyngold	6–2, 4–6, [7–10]
Loss	6–7	Apr 2025	ITF Sharm El Sheikh, Egypt	W35	Hard	Aliona Falei	(Slovakia) Katarína Kužmová; Mariia Tkacheva	4–6, 3–6
Win	7–7	Jun 2025	ITF Montemor-o-Novo, Portugal	W50	Hard	Aliona Falei	(Lithuania) Iveta Dapkutė (Poland) Weronika Ewald	6–3, 7–5
Loss	7–8	Sep 2025	ITF Le Neubourg, France	W75	Hard	Sofya Lansere	(United Kingdom) Naiktha Bains (India) Rutuja Bhosale	2–6, 6–1, [6–10]
Win	8–8	Jun 2026	ITF Hurghada, Egypt	W50	Grass	(Poland) Martyna Kubka	(Cyprus) Olga Danilova (Croatia) Karla Popović	6–2, 6–2
