= Caldas da Rainha Ladies Open =

Tennis tournament in Portugal

Portugal Ladies Open
- 2026 Caldas da Rainha Ladies Open

WTA 125
- Event name: Caldas da Rainha Ladies Open (2022–); Portugal Ladies Open (2021); Oeste Ladies Open (2019)
- Location: Caldas da Rainha, Portugal
- Venue: Clube Ténis Caldas da Rainha
- Category: WTA 125
- Surface: Hard
- Draw: 32S/16Q/16D
- Prize money: €100,000

Current champions (2026)
- Singles: (Italy) Lisa Pigato
- Doubles: (Australia) Gabriella Da Silva-Fick (Kazakhstan) Zhibek Kulambayeva

The Caldas da Rainha Ladies Open is a tournament for professional female tennis players. The event was classified as a $60,000+H ITF Women's Circuit tournament until 2024, before being upgraded to WTA 125 level. It has been held on outdoor hardcourts in Caldas da Rainha, Portugal, since 2019.

== Past finals ==
=== Singles ===
| Year | Champion | Runner-up | Score |
|---|---|---|---|
| 2026 | (Italy) Lisa Pigato | (Czech Republic) Gabriela Knutson | 6–4, 6–2 |
| 2025 | Polina Iatcenko | (Czech Republic) Gabriela Knutson | 6–2, 5–7, 6–2 |
⬆️ WTA 125 event ⬆️
| 2024 | Alina Korneeva | Anastasia Zakharova | 6–1, 6–4 |
| 2023 | (Croatia) Petra Marčinko | (France) Léolia Jeanjean | 6–4, 6–1 |
| 2022 | (Italy) Lucrezia Stefanini | (Spain) Marina Bassols Ribera | 3–6, 6–1, 7–6^{(7–3)} |
| 2021 | (China) Zheng Saisai | (France) Harmony Tan | 6–4, 3–6, 6–3 |
| 2020 | tournament cancelled due to the COVID-19 pandemic | | |
| 2019 | (Bulgaria) Isabella Shinikova | (Serbia) Natalija Kostić | 6–3, 2–0 ret. |

=== Doubles ===
| Year | Champions | Runners-up | Score |
|---|---|---|---|
| 2026 | (Australia) Gabriella Da Silva-Fick (Kazakhstan) Zhibek Kulambayeva | (India) Rutuja Bhosale (Australia) Elena Micic | 3–6, 7–6^{(7–5)}, [10–7] |
| 2025 | (United Kingdom) Harriet Dart (United Kingdom) Maia Lumsden | (United Kingdom) Madeleine Brooks; Anastasia Tikhonova | 6–0, 6–3 |
⬆️ WTA 125 event ⬆️
| 2024 | (United Kingdom) Jodie Burrage; Anastasia Tikhonova | (Portugal) Francisca Jorge (Portugal) Matilde Jorge | 7–6^{(7–3)}, 6–4 |
| 2023 | (Portugal) Francisca Jorge (Portugal) Matilde Jorge | (United States) Ashley Lahey (China) Tian Fangran | 6–1, 2–6, [10–7] |
| 2022 | (United States) Adriana Reami (United States) Anna Rogers | (United States) Elysia Bolton (United States) Jamie Loeb | 6–4, 7–5 |
| 2021 | (Japan) Momoko Kobori (Japan) Hiroko Kuwata | (United Kingdom) Alicia Barnett (United Kingdom) Olivia Nicholls | 7–6^{(7–5)}, 7–6^{(7–2)} |
| 2020 | tournament cancelled due to the COVID-19 pandemic | | |
| 2019 | (France) Jessika Ponchet (Bulgaria) Isabella Shinikova | (Kazakhstan) Anna Danilina (Germany) Vivian Heisen | 6–1, 6–3 |
