= Anastasia Tikhonova =

Russian tennis player (born 2001)

Anastasia Tikhonova Анастасия Тихонова
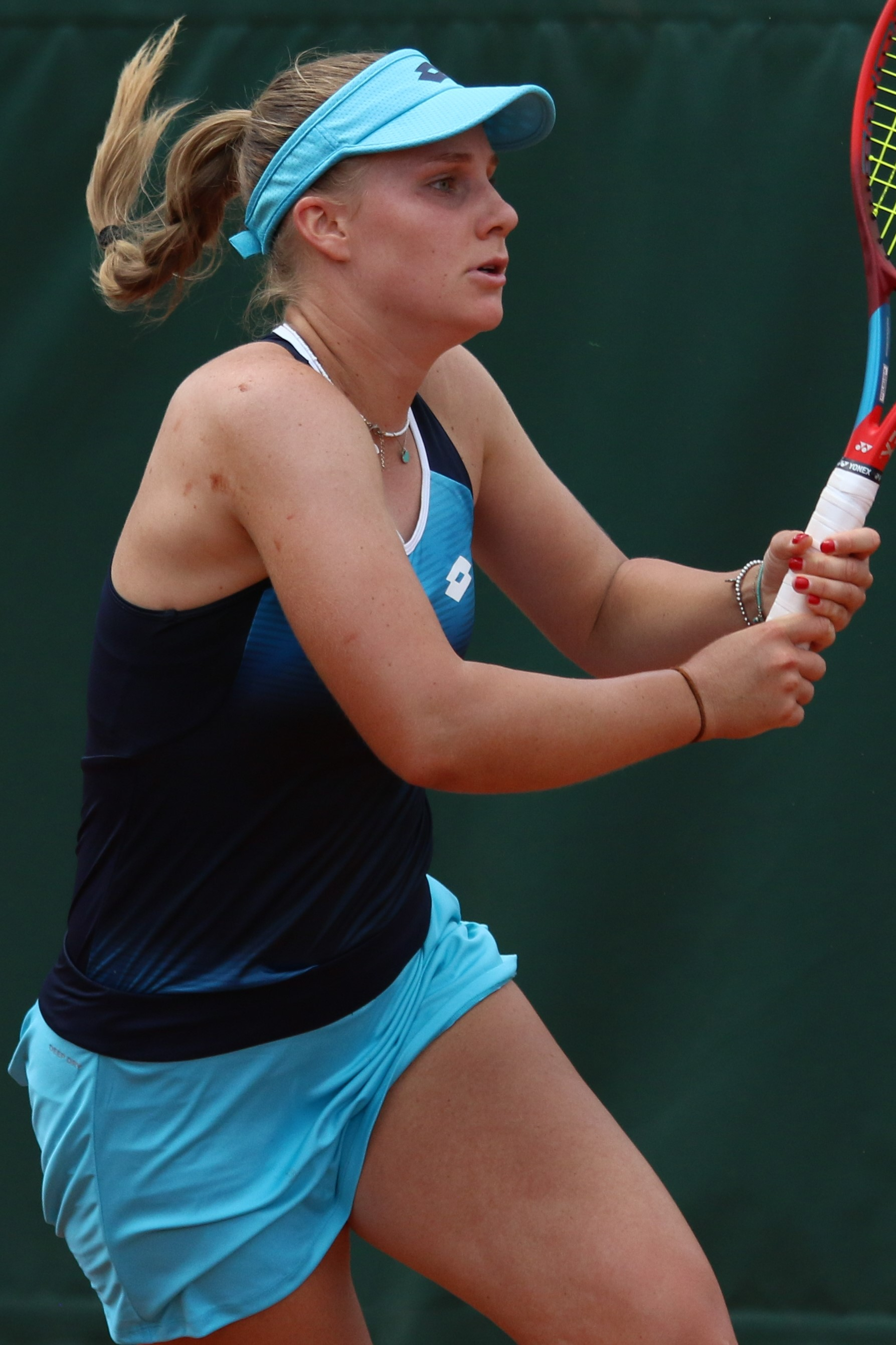
- Tikhonova at the 2022 French Open
- Full name: Anastasia Vadimovna Tikhonova
- Country (sports): Russia
- Born: 21 January 2001 (age 25)
- Plays: Right (two-handed backhand)
- Prize money: US$ 575,469

Singles
- Career record: 255–193
- Career titles: 7 ITF
- Highest ranking: No. 151 (15 January 2024)
- Current ranking: No. 324 (16 November 2026)

Grand Slam singles results
- Australian Open: Q3 (2023)
- French Open: Q2 (2024)
- Wimbledon: Q2 (2024)
- US Open: Q1 (2022, 2024)

Doubles
- Career record: 268–132
- Career titles: 5 WTA 125, 28 ITF
- Highest ranking: No. 73 (27 July 2026)
- Current ranking: No. 74 (16 November 2026)

Grand Slam doubles results
- Wimbledon: 2R (2026)
- US Open: 1R (2026)
- Last updated on: 16 November 2026.

Anastasia Vadimovna Tikhonova (Russian: Анастасия Вадимовна Тихонова; born 21 January 2001) is a Russian tennis player. Tikhonova has career-high WTA rankings of world No. 73 in doubles and No. 151 in singles.

She has won four doubles titles on the WTA 125 Tour.

== Career ==
Tikhonova made her main-draw debut on WTA Tour at the 2019 Baltic Open, having been handed a wildcard for the doubles competition, partnering Veronika Pepelyaeva.

Her singles WTA Tour debut came at the 2022 Rosmalen Championships.

Partnering with Jodie Burrage, Tikhonova won the doubles title at the W100 2024 Caldas da Rainha Ladies Open in Portugal, defeating third seeds Francisca Jorge and Matilde Jorge in straight sets in the final.

Teaming with Valeriya Strakhova, she reached her first WTA Tour doubles final at the 2026 Copa Colsanitas, losing to top seeds Caroline Dolehide and Irina Khromacheva in straight sets.

She entered the main draw of the 2026 SP Open as a lucky loser but lost to Kaitlin Quevedo.

== Performance timeline ==
Key
W	F	SF	QF	#R	RR	Q#	DNQ	A	NH

(W) winner; (F) finalist; (SF) semifinalist; (QF) quarterfinalist; (#R) rounds 4, 3, 2, 1; (RR) round-robin stage; (Q#) qualification round; (DNQ) did not qualify; (A) absent; (NH) not held; (SR) strike rate (events won / competed); (W–L) win–loss record.
To avoid confusion and double counting, these charts are updated at the conclusion of a tournament or when the player's participation has ended.

== WTA Tour finals ==
=== Doubles: 1 (runner-up) ===
Legend WTA 250 (0–1)	Finals by surface Clay (0–1)	Finals by setting Outdoors (0–1)

Result	W–L	Date	Tournament	Tier	Surface	Partner	Opponents	Score
Loss	0–1	Apr 2026	Copa Colsanitas, Colombia	WTA 250	Clay	(Ukraine) Valeriya Strakhova	(United States) Caroline Dolehide; Irina Khromacheva	6–7^{(5–7)}, 4–6

== WTA 125 finals ==
=== Doubles: 7 (5 titles, 2 runner-up) ===
Result	W–L	Date	Tournament	Surface	Partner	Opponents	Score
Win	1–0	Oct 2023	Abierto Tampico, Mexico	Hard	Kamilla Rakhimova	(United States) Sabrina Santamaria (United Kingdom) Heather Watson	7–6^{(7–5)}, 6–2
Win	2–0	Sep 2025	Open de San Sebastián, Spain	Clay	(Croatia) Tara Würth	(United States) Elvina Kalieva (Romania) Gabriela Lee	6–3, 6–0
Loss	2–1	Sep 2025	Caldas da Rainha Open, Portugal	Hard	(United Kingdom) Madeleine Brooks	(United Kingdom) Harriet Dart (United Kingdom) Maia Lumsden	0–6, 3–6
Win	3–1	Dec 2025	Quito Open, Ecuador	Clay	(Ukraine) Valeriya Strakhova	(Spain) Irene Burillo; Anastasia Zolotareva	6–4, 6–1
Win	4–1	Jul 2026	Palermo Ladies Open, Italy	Clay	(Slovenia) Tamara Zidanšek	(United States) Rasheeda McAdoo (Hungary) Adrienn Nagy	6–4, 6–4
Win	5–1	Oct 2026	Samsun Open, Turkey	Hard	Elena Pridankina	(India) Rutuja Bhosale (Australia) Elena Micic	7–6(5), 6–7(7), [10–3]
Loss	3–5	Nov 2026	Copa Colina, Chile	Clay	(Ukraine) Valeriya Strakhova	(Slovenia) Veronika Erjavec (Kazakhstan) Zhibek Kulambayeva	4–6, 3–6

== ITF Circuit finals ==
=== Singles: 11 (7 titles, 4 runner-ups) ===
Legend W100 tournaments (1–0) W60/75 tournaments (2–0) W40/50 tournaments (2–1) W25 tournaments (1–1) W15 tournaments (1–2)	Finals by surface Hard (7–4)

Result	W–L	Date	Tournament	Tier	Surface	Opponent	Score
Loss	0–1	Feb 2019	ITF Shymkent, Kazakhstan	W15	Hard (i)	(Russia) Kamilla Rakhimova	2–6, 3–6
Loss	0–2	Feb 2021	ITF Shymkent, Kazakhstan	W15	Hard (i)	(Belarus) Yuliya Hatouka	5–7, 2–6
Win	1–2	Feb 2021	ITF Shymkent, Kazakhstan	W15	Hard (i)	(Belarus) Yuliya Hatouka	7–5, 2–6, 7–6^{(2)}
Loss	1–3	Jun 2021	ITF Porto, Portugal	W25	Hard	(Japan) Mai Hontama	4–6, 3–6
Win	2–3	Jul 2021	President's Cup, Kazakhstan	W25	Hard	(Lithuania) Justina Mikulskytė	2–6, 7–5, 6–1
Win	3–3	Apr 2022	Pretoria International, South Africa	W60	Hard	(Israel) Lina Glushko	5–7, 6–3, 6–3
Win	4–3	Jan 2023	ITF Bhopal, India	W40	Hard	(Switzerland) Joanne Züger	6–4, 6–1
Win	5–3	Dec 2023	Dubai Tennis Challenge, UAE	W100	Hard	(Netherlands) Arianne Hartono	6–1, 6–4
Win	6–3	Oct 2025	Challenger de Saguenay, Canada	W75	Hard (i)	(Slovakia) Viktória Hrunčáková	6–3, 6–2
Win	7–3	Nov 2025	ITF Chihuahua, Mexico	W50	Hard	(United States) Hina Inoue	6–4, 7–5
Loss	7–4	Oct 2026	ITF Morelia, Mexico	W50	Hard	(United States) Malaika Rapolu	4–6, 0–6

=== Doubles: 44 (28 titles, 16 runner-ups) ===
Legend W100 tournaments (3–2) W80 tournaments (0–1) W60/75 tournaments (12–3) W40/50 tournaments (5–2) W25 tournaments (2–6) W15 tournaments (6–2)	Finals by surface Hard (24–10) Clay (4–6)

Result	W–L	Date	Tournament	Tier	Surface	Partner	Opponents	Score
Loss	0–1	May 2018	Khimki Cup, Russia	W100	Hard (i)	(Russia) Veronika Pepelyaeva	(Russia) Olga Doroshina (Russia) Anastasiya Komardina	1–6, 2–6
Win	1–1	Aug 2018	ITF Kazan, Russia	W15	Clay	(Russia) Maria Krupenina	(Russia) Daria Mishina (Russia) Noel Saidenova	4–6, 6–3, [10–8]
Loss	1–2	Nov 2018	ITF Antalya, Turkey	W15	Hard	(Russia) Veronika Pepelyaeva	(Hungary) Ágnes Bukta (Bulgaria) Dia Evtimova	3–6, 6–3, [9–11]
Win	2–2	Dec 2019	ITF Milovice, Czech Republic	W15	Hard (i)	(Russia) Aleksandra Pospelova	(Czech Republic) Karolína Beránková (Czech Republic) Barbora Miklová	6–1, 7–5
Win	3–2	Jan 2020	ITF Monastir, Tunisia	W15	Hard	(India) Zeel Desai	(Serbia) Bojana Marinković (Slovakia) Tereza Mihalíková	7–6^{(4)}, 5–7, [10–5]
Win	4–2	Feb 2020	ITF Monastir, Tunisia	W15	Hard	(Russia) Anastasia Pribylova	(Germany) Katharina Hering (Germany) Lisa Ponomar	5–7, 7–6^{(4)}, [10–4]
Win	5–2	Oct 2020	ITF Sharm El Sheikh, Egypt	W15	Hard	(Russia) Veronika Pepelyaeva	(Canada) Bianca Fernandez (Canada) Leylah Fernandez	4–6, 6–3, [10–6]
Loss	5–3	Dec 2020	ITF Cairo, Egypt	W15	Hard	(Russia) Elina Avanesyan	(Russia) Daria Mishina (Russia) Noel Saidenova	2–6, 6–2, [9–11]
Win	6–3	Feb 2021	ITF Shymkent, Kazakhstan	W15	Hard (i)	(Poland) Weronika Baszak	(Russia) Daria Mishina (Russia) Noel Saidenova	6–2, 3–6, [10–6]
Loss	6–4	Jun 2021	ITF Figueira da Foz, Portugal	W25	Hard	(Turkey) Berfu Cengiz	(United Kingdom) Alicia Barnett (United Kingdom) Olivia Nicholls	3–6, 6–7^{(3)}
Loss	6–5	Jul 2021	President's Cup, Kazakhstan	W25	Hard	(Russia) Vlada Koval	(Georgia (country)) Mariam Bolkvadze (Russia) Ekaterina Yashina	6–7^{(7)}, 1–6
Win	7–5	Sep 2021	ITF Leiria, Portugal	W25	Hard	(Brazil) Carolina Alves	(Spain) Celia Cerviño Ruiz (Italy) Angelica Moratelli	6–4, 6–4
Loss	7–6	Mar 2022	ITF Santo Domingo, Dominican Republic	W25	Hard	(Latvia) Darja Semenistaja	Irina Khromacheva (Serbia) Natalija Stevanović	1–6, 6–7^{(5)}
Loss	7–7	Mar 2022	Guanajuato Open, Mexico	W60+H	Hard	(Latvia) Daniela Vismane	(United States) Kaitlyn Christian (Belarus) Lidziya Marozava	0–6, 2–6
Loss	7–8	Apr 2022	Edge Istanbul, Turkey	W60	Clay	(Turkey) Berfu Cengiz	(Poland) Maja Chwalińska (Czech Republic) Jesika Malečková	6–2, 4–6, [7–10]
Loss	7–9	May 2022	Open Saint-Gaudens, France	W60	Clay	(Greece) Valentini Grammatikopoulou	(Mexico) Fernanda Contreras Gómez (Switzerland) Lulu Sun	5–7, 2–6
Win	8–9	Jun 2022	ITF Madrid Open, Spain	W60	Hard	(Kazakhstan) Anna Danilina	(China) Lu Jiajing (China) You Xiaodi	6–4, 6–2
Loss	8–10	Sep 2022	ITF Santarém, Portugal	W25	Hard	(Netherlands) Suzan Lamens	(Japan) Mai Hontama (Australia) Maddison Inglis	0–6, 4–6
Win	9–10	Jan 2023	Canberra International, Australia	W60	Hard	Irina Khromacheva	(United States) Robin Anderson (United States) Hailey Baptiste	6–4, 7–5
Win	10–10	Mar 2023	Nur-Sultan Challenger, Kazakhstan	W60	Hard (i)	Polina Kudermetova	(South Korea) Han Na-lae (South Korea) Jang Su-jeong	2–6, 6–3, [10–7]
Win	11–10	Mar 2023	Branik Maribor Open, Slovenia	W40	Hard (i)	Sofya Lansere	(Romania) Irina Bara (Romania) Andreea Mitu	6–3, 6–2
Win	12–10	Jun 2023	Internazionali di Caserta, Italy	W60	Clay	(Japan) Moyuka Uchijima	(Greece) Despina Papamichail (Italy) Camilla Rosatello	6–4, 6–2
Loss	12–11	Jul 2023	Figueira da Foz Open, Portugal	W100	Hard	Alina Korneeva	(Hong Kong) Eudice Chong (Netherlands) Arianne Hartono	3–6, 2–6
Win	13–11	Aug 2023	ITF Barcelona, Spain	W60	Hard	(India) Prarthana Thombare	(France) Estelle Cascino (Latvia) Diāna Marcinkēviča	3–6, 6–1, [10–7]
Win	14–11	Oct 2023	Georgia's Rome Open, United States	W60	Hard (i)	(United States) Sofia Sewing	(United States) Robin Anderson (Mexico) Fernanda Contreras Gómez	4–6, 6–3, [10–7]
Loss	14–12	Oct 2023	Tennis Classic of Macon, United States	W80	Hard	(United States) Sofia Sewing	(Belarus) Jana Kolodynska; Tatiana Prozorova	3–6, 2–6
Win	15–12	Mar 2024	Branik Maribor Open, Slovenia	W60	Hard (i)	(United Kingdom) Eden Silva	(Thailand) Luksika Kumkhum (Thailand) Peangtarn Plipuech	7–5, 6–3
Win	16–12	Sep 2024	ITF Le Neubourg, France	W75	Hard	(Israel) Lina Glushko	Julia Avdeeva; Ekaterina Maklakova	6–3, 6–1
Win	17–12	Sep 2024	Caldas da Rainha Open, Portugal	W100	Hard	(United Kingdom) Jodie Burrage	(Portugal) Francisca Jorge (Portugal) Matilde Jorge	7–6^{(3)}, 6–4
Win	18–12	Dec 2024	Dubai Tennis Challenge, United Arab Emirates	W100	Hard	(Czech Republic) Anastasia Dețiuc	(Netherlands) Isabelle Haverlag; Elena Pridankina	6–3, 6–7^{(7)}, [10–8]
Win	19–12	Mar 2025	ITF Santo Domingo, Dominican Republic	W50	Hard	Mariia Tkacheva	(United States) Ayana Akli (United States) Clervie Ngounoue	7–6^{(5)}, 6–7^{(2)}, [10–7]
Loss	19–13	May 2025	ITF Båstad, Sweden	W35	Clay	(Sweden) Lisa Zaar	(Colombia) Yuliana Lizarazo (Colombia) María Paulina Pérez	3–6, 2–6
Win	20–13	Jul 2025	ITF Mohammedia, Morocco	W35	Clay	(Sweden) Lisa Zaar	(Japan) Rinko Matsuda (Italy) Sofia Rocchetti	6–2, 6–2
Win	21–13	Oct 2025	Edmond Open, United States	W100	Hard	(Ukraine) Valeriya Strakhova	(Australia) Olivia Gadecki (Poland) Olivia Lincer	6–3, 6–7^{(2)}, [10-8]
Win	22–13	Oct 2025	Toronto Challenger, Canada	W75	Hard (i)	(Slovakia) Viktória Hrunčáková	(United States) Fiona Crawley (United States) Jaeda Daniel	6–4, 6–2
Win	23–13	Jan 2026	ITF Manama, Bahrain	W75	Hard	(Slovakia) Viktória Hrunčáková	(Belgium) Polina Bakhmutkina (Germany) Mina Hodzic	6–4, 6–3
Win	24–13	Feb 2026	Trnava Indoor, Slovakia	W75	Hard (i)	(Australia) Olivia Gadecki	(Czech Republic) Aneta Kučmová (Czech Republic) Aneta Laboutková	6–3, 6–3
Win	25–13	Mar 2026	Trnava Indoor, Slovakia	W75	Hard (i)	(Czech Republic) Anna Sisková	(Spain) Aliona Bolsova (Spain) Yvonne Cavallé Reimers	6–1, 6–2
Loss	25–14	Apr 2026	Florida's Sports Coast Open, United States	W35	Clay	Daria Egorova	(United States) Savannah Broadus (United States) Hibah Shaikh	3–6, 7–5, [5–10]
Win	26–14	May 2026	ITF Portorož, Slovenia	W50	Clay	(Italy) Angelica Moratelli	Alevtina Ibragimova (Hungary) Amarissa Tóth	3–6, 6–3, [10–4]
Loss	26–15	Aug 2026	Hamburg Ladies Cup, Germany	W50	Clay	(Ukraine) Valeriya Strakhova	(Japan) Momoko Kobori (Japan) Ayano Shimizu	4–6, 2–6
Loss	26–16	Aug 2026	Prague Open, Czech Republic	W50	Clay	(Ukraine) Valeriya Strakhova	(Czech Republic) Alena Kovačková (Czech Republic) Jana Kovačková	2–6, 3–6
Win	27–16	Oct 2026	ITF Morelia, Mexico	W50	Hard	(Turkey) İpek Öz	(United States) Jo-yee Chan (United States) Kennedy Gibbs	7–6^{(2)}, 6–3
Win	28–16	Nov 2026	ITF Chihuahua, Mexico	W50	Hard	(Ukraine) Valeriya Strakhova	(Canada) Kayla Cross (Greece) Despina Papamichail	6–0, 7–6^{(4)}

== Junior Grand Slam final ==
=== Doubles: 1 runner-up ===
Result	Year	Tournament	Surface	Partner	Opponents	Score
Loss	2019	French Open	Clay	(Russia) Alina Charaeva	(United States) Chloe Beck (United States) Emma Navarro	1–6, 2–6
