= Francisca Jorge =

Portuguese tennis player (born 2000)

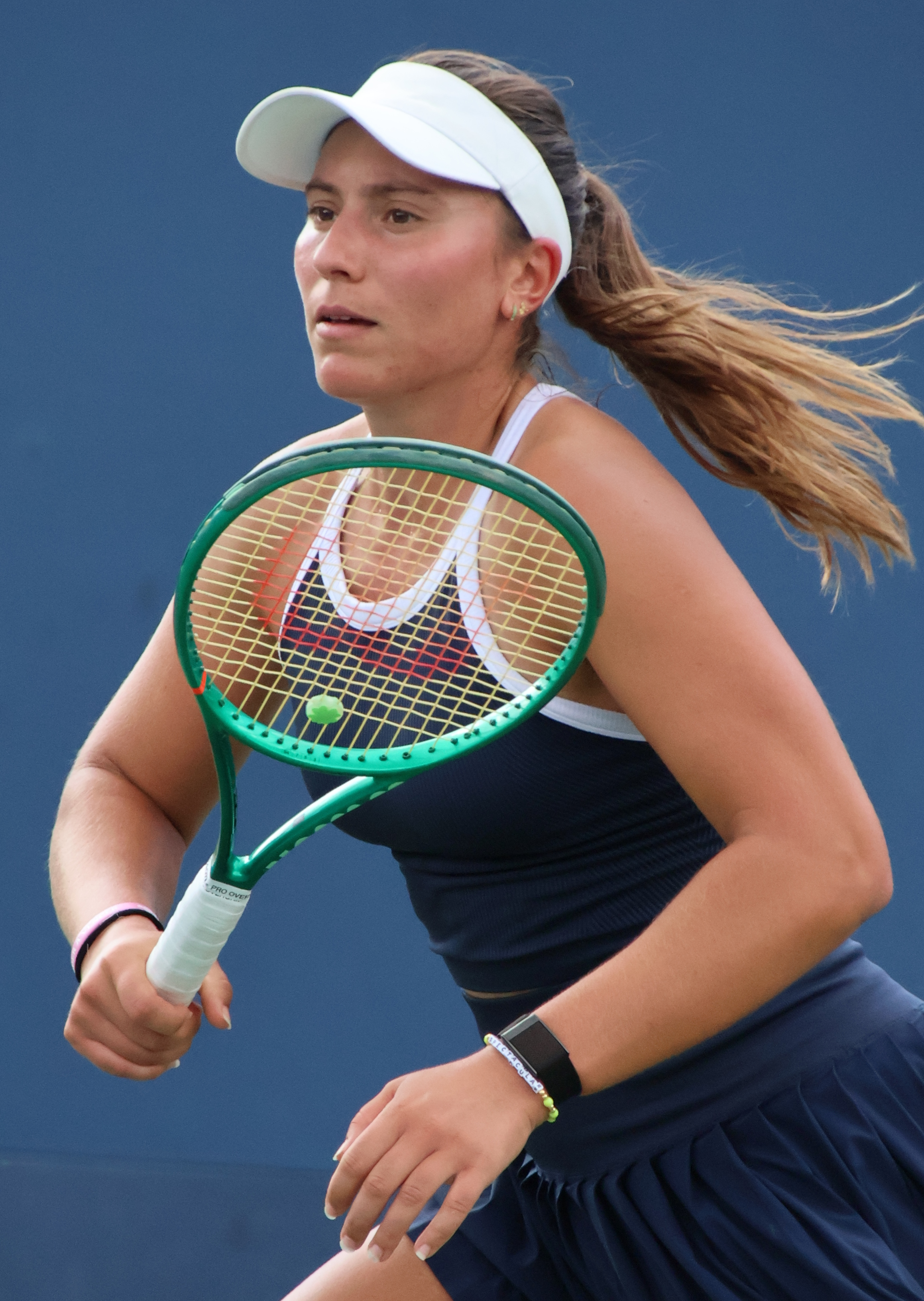
- Jorge at the 2026 US Open
- Country (sports): Portugal
- Born: 21 April 2000 (age 26)
- Plays: Right-handed
- Prize money: $539,837

Singles
- Career record: 284–224
- Career titles: 7 ITF
- Highest ranking: No. 176 (15 July 2024)
- Current ranking: No. 214 (28 September 2026)

Grand Slam singles results
- Australian Open: Q1 (2024, 2026)
- French Open: Q2 (2026)
- Wimbledon: Q2 (2026)
- US Open: Q2 (2026)

Doubles
- Career record: 296–129
- Career titles: 3 WTA Challengers, 35 ITF
- Highest ranking: No. 97 (19 May 2025)
- Current ranking: No. 148 (28 September 2026)

Team competitions
- BJK Cup: 29–25 (singles 18–14)
- Last updated on: 28 September 2026.

Francisca Jorge (born 21 April 2000) is a Portuguese tennis player. She has a career-high WTA singles ranking of No. 176, reached on 15 July 2024, and best in doubles of No. 97, achieved on 19 May 2025.

Jorge has won three WTA 125 tournaments in doubles, with seven titles in singles and 35 in doubles on the ITF World Tennis Tour.

Playing for Portugal Fed Cup team (nowadays: BJK Cup team), she has won 29 and lost 25 rubbers in the 36 ties she has played since 2017.

== Career ==
In April 2024, she won her first WTA 125 title, partnering with her younger sister Matilde Jorge. In September 2024, the sisters were runners-up at the W100 Caldas da Rainha Ladies Open in Portugal, losing in the final to Jodie Burrage and Anastasia Tikhonova.

== WTA 125 finals ==
=== Doubles: 3 (titles) ===
Result	W–L	Date	Tournament	Surface	Partner	Opponents	Score
Win	1–0	Apr 2024	Oeiras Ladies Open, Portugal	Clay	(Portugal) Matilde Jorge	(United Kingdom) Harriet Dart (France) Kristina Mladenovic	6–0, 6–4
Win	2-0	Apr 2025	Oeiras Ladies Open, Portugal	Clay	(Portugal) Matilde Jorge	(Czech Republic) Anastasia Dețiuc (Romania) Patricia Maria Țig	6–1, 6–2
Win	3-0	Sep 2026	Porto Open, Portugal	Hard	(Portugal) Matilde Jorge	(Canada) Ariana Arseneault (Canada) Raphaëlle Lacasse	6–3, 3–6, [10–3]

== ITF Circuit finals ==
=== Singles: 16 (7 titles, 9 runner-ups) ===
Legend W60/75 tournaments (1–3) W40/50 tournaments (1–2) W25 tournaments (2–2) W15 tournaments (3–2)	Finals by surface Hard (5–7) Clay (1–2) Carpet (1–0)

Result	W–L	Date	Tournament	Tier	Surface	Opponent	Score
Win	1–0	Oct 2018	ITF Lousada, Portugal	W15	Hard (i)	(France) Aubane Droguet	6–3, 3–6, 7–6^{(4)}
Win	2–0	Nov 2018	ITF Lousada, Portugal	W15	Hard (i)	(Spain) Alba Carrillo Marín	7–6^{(3)}, 6–0
Loss	2–1	May 2019	ITF Montemor-o-Novo, Portugal	W15	Hard	(Spain) Alba Carrillo Marín	0–6, 6–4, 3–6
Win	3–1	Oct 2019	ITF Lousada, Portugal	W15	Hard (i)	(France) Carole Monnet	4–6, 7–6^{(6)}, 6–4
Loss	3–2	Oct 2020	ITF Porto, Portugal	W25	Hard	(Spain) Georgina García Pérez	6–1, 4–6, 3–6
Loss	3–3	Oct 2020	ITF Funchal, Portugal	W15	Hard	(Brazil) Beatriz Haddad Maia	3–6, 3–6
Win	4–3	Jun 2022	ITF Cantanhede, Portugal	W25	Carpet	Vitalia Diatchenko	7–5, 7–5
Loss	4–4	Apr 2023	Oeiras CETO Open, Portugal	W60	Clay	(Uzbekistan) Nigina Abduraimova	6–1, 4–6, 3–6
Loss	4–5	Aug 2023	ITF Ourense, Spain	W25	Hard	(Netherlands) Lesley Pattinama-Kerkhove	6–7^{(1)}, 4–6
Win	5–5	Dec 2023	ITF Mogi das Cruzes, Brazil	W25	Clay	(Lithuania) Justina Mikulskytė	6–1, 6–1
Loss	5–6	Dec 2023	ITF Vacaria, Brazil	W60	Clay (i)	(France) Séléna Janicijevic	6–3, 3–6, 2–6
Win	6–6	Jun 2024	Guimarães Ladies Open, Portugal	W75	Hard	(United States) Liv Hovde	6–3, 6–4
Loss	6–7	Jun 2025	ITF Montemor-o-Novo, Portugal	W50	Hard	(Portugal) Matilde Jorge	1–6, 3–6
Win	7–7	Jun 2025	Guimarães Ladies Open, Portugal	W50	Hard	(Portugal) Matilde Jorge	5–7, 6–2, 6–2
Loss	7–8	Oct 2025	Internationaux de Poitiers, France	W75	Hard (i)	(Ukraine) Veronika Podrez	5–7, 6–2, 4–6
Loss	7–9	Jun 2026	ITF Montemor-o-Novo, Portugal	W50	Hard	(South Korea) Ku Yeon-woo	6–3, 4–6, 2–6

=== Doubles: 70 (36 titles, 34 runner-ups) ===
Legend W100 tournaments (2–3) W60/75 tournaments (10–6) W40/50 tournaments (4–4) W25/35 tournaments (12–4) W10/15 tournaments (8–17)	Finals by surface Hard (24–22) Clay (10–10) Carpet (2–2)

Result	W–L	Date	Tournament	Tier	Surface	Partner	Opponents	Score
Win	1–0	Jun 2016	ITF Cantanhede, Portugal	W10	Carpet	(Portugal) Marta Oliveira	(Portugal) Inês Murta (France) Laëtitia Sarrazin	3–6, 6–3, [10–7]
Loss	1–1	Oct 2016	ITF Porto, Portugal	W10	Clay	(Portugal) Rita Vilaça	(Chinese Taipei) Hsieh Shu-ying (Chinese Taipei) Hsieh Su-wei	3–6, 4–6
Loss	1–2	Jun 2017	ITF Montemor-o-Novo, Portugal	W15	Hard	(Portugal) Marta Oliveira	(Czech Republic) Monika Kilnarová (Russia) Valeriya Zeleva	6–3, 5–7, [2–10]
Loss	1–3	Aug 2017	ITF Wanfercée-Baulet, Belgium	W15	Clay	(Spain) Helena Jansen Figueras	(Belgium) Lara Salden (Belgium) Chelsea Vanhoutte	3–6, 6–7^{(3)}
Loss	1–4	Jul 2018	ITF Corroios, Portugal	W15	Hard	(Spain) María Luque Moreno	(Cambodia) Andrea Ka (United Kingdom) Eden Silva	6–3, 1–6, [5–10]
Loss	1–5	Sep 2018	ITF Montemor-o-Novo, Portugal	W15	Hard	(Portugal) Lúcia Quitério	(Portugal) Inês Murta (Switzerland) Nina Stadler	1–6, 0–6
Loss	1–6	Oct 2018	ITF Cantanhede, Portugal	W15	Carpet	(United Kingdom) Anna Popescu	(United Kingdom) Katharina Hering (Slovenia) Manca Pislak	4–6, 6–2, [8–10]
Loss	1–7	Oct 2018	ITF Lousada, Portugal	W15	Hard (i)	(Estonia) Maileen Nuudi	(United Kingdom) Katharina Hering (Spain) Olga Parres Azcoitia	2–6, 2–6
Loss	1–8	Mar 2019	ITF Monastir, Tunisia	W15	Hard	(Cambodia) Andrea Ka	(France) Loudmilla Bencheikh (France) Lou Brouleau	3–6, 4–6
Loss	1–9	May 2019	ITF Cantanhede, Portugal	W15	Carpet	(Russia) Anna Ureke	(Spain) Alba Carrillo Marín (Bolivia) Noelia Zeballos	3–6, 6–4, [6–10]
Loss	1–10	Jun 2019	ITF Montemor-o-Novo, Portugal	W15	Hard	(Portugal) Maria Inês Fonte	(Netherlands) Suzan Lamens (Russia) Anna Pribylova	2–6, 6–2, [7–10]
Win	2–10	Jun 2019	ITF Amarante, Portugal	W15	Hard	(Spain) Olga Parres Azcoitia	(Republic of Ireland) Georgia Drummy (United States) Christina Rosca	6–4, 2–6, [12–10]
Win	3–10	Jun 2019	ITF Figueira da Foz, Portugal	W25	Hard	(Spain) Olga Parres Azcoitia	(Brazil) Laura Pigossi (Japan) Moyuka Uchijima	6–4, 4–6, [11–9]
Loss	3–11	Jul 2019	ITF Corroios, Portugal	W25	Hard	(Spain) Olga Parres Azcoitia	(Australia) Alison Bai (New Zealand) Paige Hourigan	6–3, 2–6, [12–14]
Loss	3–12	Oct 2019	ITF Lousada, Portugal	W15	Hard (i)	(Spain) Olga Parres Azcoitia	(Spain) Celia Cerviño Ruiz (Spain) Angeles Moreno Barranquero	3–6, 5–7
Win	4–12	Nov 2019	ITF Lousada, Portugal	W15	Hard (i)	(Spain) Olga Parres Azcoitia	(Portugal) Ana Filipa Santos (Spain) Almudena Sanz-Llaneza	6–4, 6–3
Loss	4–13	Jan 2020	ITF Stuttgart, Germany	W15	Hard (i)	(Czech Republic) Karolína Beránková	(Russia) Alena Fomina (Italy) Angelica Moratelli	5–7, 2–6
Loss	4–14	Aug 2020	ITF Oeiras, Portugal	W15	Clay	(Spain) Olga Parres Azcoitia	(Spain) Eva Guerrero Álvarez (France) Diane Parry	6–7^{(1)}, 0–6
Win	5–14	Sep 2020	ITF Santarém, Portugal	W15	Hard	(Spain) Olga Parres Azcoitia	(Poland) Martyna Kubka (Ukraine) Valeriya Strakhova	6–2, 6–3
Win	6–14	Feb 2021	ITF Manacor, Spain	W15	Hard	(Netherlands) Stephanie Visscher	(Italy) Camilla Rosatello (Russia) Ekaterina Yashina	6–7^{(4)}, 6–3, [10–2]
Win	7–14	Mar 2021	ITF Le Havre, France	W15	Clay (i)	(Italy) Camilla Rosatello	(France) Anaëlle Leclercq (France) Lucie Nguyen Tan	7–5, 6–2
Loss	7–15	May 2021	ITF Salinas, Ecuador	W15	Hard	(Sweden) Jacqueline Cabaj Awad	(United Kingdom) Jodie Burrage (New Zealand) Paige Hourigan	2–6, 6–2, [8–10]
Loss	7–16	Oct 2021	ITF Loulé, Portugal	W15	Hard	(Portugal) Matilde Jorge	(Greece) Despina Papamichail (Serbia) Natalija Stevanović	2–6, 5–7
Loss	7–17	Apr 2022	ITF Oeiras, Portugal	W15	Clay	(Portugal) Matilde Jorge	(Spain) Jéssica Bouzas Maneiro (Spain) Guiomar Maristany	6–3, 4–6, [8–10]
Loss	7–18	May 2022	ITF Santa Margherita di Pula, Italy	W15	Clay	(Portugal) Matilde Jorge	(Italy) Angelica Moratelli (Italy) Camilla Rosatello	4–6, 5–7
Win	8–18	May 2022	ITF Santa Margherita di Pula, Italy	W15	Clay	(Portugal) Matilde Jorge	(Italy) Martina Colmegna (Italy) Lisa Pigato	7–5, 0–6, [11–9]
Win	9–18	May 2022	ITF Montemor-o-Novo, Portugal	W15	Hard	(Portugal) Matilde Jorge	(Australia) Alana Parnaby (India) Prarthana Thombare	6–3, 6–4
Loss	9–19	Jun 2022	Internazionali di Caserta, Italy	W60	Clay	(Portugal) Matilde Jorge	(Greece) Despina Papamichail (Italy) Camilla Rosatello	6–4, 2–6, [6–10]
Win	10–19	Jul 2022	ITF Guimarães, Portugal	W25	Hard	(Portugal) Matilde Jorge	(United Kingdom) Sarah Beth Grey (United States) Jamie Loeb	6–3, 6–1
Win	11–19	Jul 2022	ITF Figueira da Foz, Portugal	W25+H	Hard	(Australia) Alexandra Bozovic	(Chinese Taipei) Lee Pei-chi (Chinese Taipei) Wu Fang-hsien	6–2, 3–6, [12–10]
Win	12–19	Sep 2022	ITF Leiria, Portugal	W25	Hard	(Portugal) Matilde Jorge	(South Korea) Choi Ji-hee (Serbia) Natalija Stevanović	6–4, 6–0
Win	13–19	Oct 2022	Lisboa Belém Open, Portugal	W25	Clay	(Portugal) Matilde Jorge	(Spain) Irene Burillo Escorihuela (Spain) Andrea Lázaro García	6–2, 6–2
Win	14–19	Oct 2022	ITF Quinta do Lago, Portugal	W25	Hard	(Portugal) Matilde Jorge	(South Korea) Ku Yeon-woo (Hungary) Adrienn Nagy	6–4, 6–4
Win	15–19	Oct 2022	ITF Loulé, Portugal	W25	Hard	(Portugal) Matilde Jorge	(Chinese Taipei) Lee Pei-chi (Chinese Taipei) Wu Fang-hsien	6–3, 7–5
Win	16–19	Nov 2022	ITF Funchal, Portugal	W25	Hard	(Portugal) Matilde Jorge	(Germany) Joëlle Steur (Netherlands) Judith Visscher	5–7, 7–5, [10–7]
Win	17–19	Dec 2022	Aberto da República, Brazil	W60	Clay	(Brazil) Ingrid Martins	(United States) Anna Rogers (United States) Christina Rosca	6–4, 6–3
Loss	17–20	Mar 2023	ITF Bangalore, India	W25	Hard	(Portugal) Matilde Jorge	(Bosnia and Herzegovina) Dea Herdželaš (United Kingdom) Eden Silva	6–3, 4–6, [7–10]
Win	18–20	Mar 2023	ITF Bangalore, India	W40	Hard	(Portugal) Matilde Jorge	(Greece) Valentini Grammatikopoulou (United Kingdom) Eden Silva	5–7, 6–0, [10–3]
Win	19–20	Mar 2023	ITF Palmanova, Spain	W25	Clay	(Portugal) Matilde Jorge	(Georgia (country)) Ekaterine Gorgodze (Belarus) Iryna Shymanovich	6–1, 3–6, [10–8]
Win	20–20	Mar 2023	ITF Palmanova, Spain	W25	Clay	(Portugal) Matilde Jorge	(Georgia (country)) Ekaterine Gorgodze (Belarus) Iryna Shymanovich	2–6, 6–3, [10–8]
Loss	20–21	Apr 2023	Oeiras Ladies Open, Portugal	W100	Clay	(Portugal) Matilde Jorge	(Norway) Ulrikke Eikeri (Japan) Eri Hozumi	6–4, 4–6, [5–10]
Loss	20–22	May 2023	ITF Platja d'Aro, Spain	W25	Hard	(Portugal) Matilde Jorge	(United States) Ashley Lahey (Australia) Ellen Perez	3–6, 6–3, [10–12]
Loss	20–23	Jun 2023	ITF Guimaraes, Portugal	W25	Hard	(Portugal) Matilde Jorge	(Spain) Georgina García Pérez (Australia) Petra Hule	4–6, 5–7
Win	21–23	Jul 2023	ITF Cantanhede, Portugal	W25	Carpet	(Portugal) Matilde Jorge	(United Kingdom) Madeleine Brooks (United Kingdom) Holly Hutchinson	6–3, 6–3
Loss	21–24	Jul 2023	Porto Indoor, Portugal	W40	Hard (i)	(Portugal) Matilde Jorge	(Australia) Gabriella Da Silva Fick (Australia) Alexandra Osborne	4–6, 3–6
Loss	21–25	Sep 2023	Montreux Ladies Open, Switzerland	W60	Clay	(Portugal) Matilde Jorge	Amina Anshba (Netherlands) Lexie Stevens	6–1, 5–7, [10–12]
Win	22–25	Sep 2023	ITF Leiria, Portugal	W25	Hard	(Portugal) Matilde Jorge	(Belgium) Sofia Costoulas (Switzerland) Jenny Dürst	7–5, 7–6^{(5)}
Win	23–25	Sep 2023	Caldas da Rainha Open, Portugal	W60	Hard	(Portugal) Matilde Jorge	(United States) Ashley Lahey (China) Tian Fangran	6–1, 2–6, [10–7]
Loss	23–26	Oct 2023	ITF Quinta do Lago, Portugal	W40	Hard	(Portugal) Matilde Jorge	(Australia) Olivia Gadecki (United Kingdom) Heather Watson	4–6, 1–6
Win	24–26	Oct 2023	GB Pro-Series Glasgow, United Kingdom	W60	Hard (i)	(United Kingdom) Maia Lumsden	(United Kingdom) Freya Christie (Australia) Olivia Gadecki	6–3, 6–1
Loss	24–27	Dec 2023	ITF Vacaria, Brazil	W60	Clay (i)	(Portugal) Matilde Jorge	(Peru) Romina Ccuno (Lithuania) Justina Mikulskytė	2–6, 3–6
Loss	24–28	Jan 2024	Porto Indoor 1, Portugal	W75	Hard (i)	(Portugal) Matilde Jorge	(United Kingdom) Sarah Beth Grey (United Kingdom) Olivia Nicholls	6–4, 3–6, [6–10]
Loss	24–29	Jan 2024	Porto Indoor 2, Portugal	W50	Hard (i)	(Portugal) Matilde Jorge	(Slovenia) Veronika Erjavec (Czech Republic) Dominika Šalková	6–4, 5–7, [8–10]
Loss	24–30	Feb 2024	Porto Indoor 3, Portugal	W75	Hard (i)	(Portugal) Matilde Jorge	(Hungary) Anna Bondár (Switzerland) Céline Naef	4–6, 6–3, [9–11]
Win	25–30	Mar 2024	ITF Murska Sobota, Slovenia	W50	Hard (i)	(United States) Anna Rogers	(Uzbekistan) Nigina Abduraimova (Czech Republic) Jesika Malečková	6–4, 5–7, [10–8]
Win	26–30	Apr 2024	Oeiras Open, Portugal	W100	Clay	(Portugal) Matilde Jorge	Yana Sizikova (Chinese Taipei) Wu Fang-hsien	6–2, 6–0
Loss	26–31	Jun 2024	Guimarães Ladies Open, Portugal	W75	Hard	(Portugal) Matilde Jorge	(United States) Sophie Chang (United States) Rasheeda McAdoo	6–7^{(6)}, 7–6^{(2)}, [5–10]
Loss	26–32	Sep 2024	Caldas da Rainha Open, Portugal	W100	Hard	(Portugal) Matilde Jorge	(United Kingdom) Jodie Burrage; Anastasia Tikhonova	6–7^{(3)}, 4–6
Win	27–32	Sep 2024	Lisboa Belém Open, Portugal	W75	Clay	(Portugal) Matilde Jorge	(Spain) Yvonne Cavallé Reimers (Spain) Ángela Fita Boluda	7–6^{(5)}, 6–4
Win	28–32	Jan 2025	Porto Indoor, Portugal	W50+H	Hard (i)	(Portugal) Matilde Jorge	(Croatia) Lucija Ćirić Bagarić (Slovenia) Kristina Novak	6–3, 6–2
Win	29–32	Feb 2025	ITF Birmingham, United Kingdom	W50	Hard (i)	(Portugal) Matilde Jorge	(Slovakia) Viktória Hrunčáková (Poland) Alicja Rosolska	6–2, 4–6, [10–5]
Win	30–32	Mar 2025	Porto Indoor, Portugal	W75	Hard (i)	(Portugal) Matilde Jorge	(Chinese Taipei) Cho I-hsuan (Chinese Taipei) Cho Yi-tsen	0–6, 7–6^{(4)}, [10–8]
Win	31–32	Apr 2025	Oeiras Open, Portugal	W100	Clay	(Portugal) Matilde Jorge	(Serbia) Aleksandra Krunić (United States) Sabrina Santamaria	6–7^{(7)}, 6–1, [1–0] ret.
Win	32–32	May 2025	Zagreb Open, Croatia	W75	Clay	(Portugal) Matilde Jorge	(Croatia) Lucija Ćirić Bagarić; Vitalia Diatchenko	6–2, 6–0
Loss	32–33	Jul 2025	Figueira da Foz Open, Portugal	W100	Hard	(Portugal) Matilde Jorge	(Czech Republic) Aneta Laboutková (Lithuania) Justina Mikulskytė	4–6, 6–3, [6–10]
Loss	32–34	Aug 2025	ITF Kuršumlijska, Serbia	W75	Clay	(Portugal) Matilde Jorge	(Serbia) Natalija Senić (Serbia) Anja Stanković	2–6, 5–7
Win	33–34	Oct 2025	ITF Quinta do Lago, Portugal	W75	Hard (i)	(Portugal) Matilde Jorge	(Czech Republic) Anna Sisková; Maria Timofeeva	4–6, 7–5, [10–7]
Win	34–34	Jan 2026	Porto Indoor, Portugal	W75	Hard (i)	(Portugal) Matilde Jorge	(Ukraine) Nadiia Kolb (Slovenia) Kristina Novak	6–2, 6–4
Win	35–34	Aug 2026	ITF Ourense, Spain	W75	Hard	(Portugal) Matilde Jorge	(United Kingdom) Freya Christie (United Kingdom) Alicia Dudeney	walkover
Win	36–34	Oct 2026	Internationaux Féminins de la Vienne, France	W75	Hard (i)	(Portugal) Matilde Jorge	(France) Estelle Cascino (China) Feng Shuo	6–2, 7–6^{(6)}
