= Matilde Jorge =

Portuguese tennis player (born 2004)

- Country (sports): Portugal
- Born: 7 April 2004 (age 22) Guimarães, Portugal
- Plays: Right (two-handed backhand)
- Prize money: $238,922

Singles
- Career record: 151–152
- Career titles: 3 ITF
- Highest ranking: No. 212 (8 September 2025)
- Current ranking: No. 250 (28 September 2026)

Grand Slam singles results
- French Open: Q2 (2026)

Doubles
- Career record: 218–68
- Career titles: 4 WTA Challengers, 29 ITF
- Highest ranking: No. 91 (9 February 2026)
- Current ranking: No. 104 (28 September 2026)

Team competitions
- Fed Cup: 14–5 (doubles 11–2)
- Last updated on: 28 September 2026.

Matilde Jorge (born 7 April 2004) is a Portuguese professional tennis player. She has career-high WTA rankings of No. 212 in singles, achieved on 8 September 2025, and world No. 91 in doubles, achieved on 9 February 2026.

== Early life ==
Jorge was born in Guimarães. Her older sister, Francisca Jorge, is also a tennis player. She began playing tennis at the age of five at the Guimarães Tennis Club. She currently trains at the Portuguese Tennis Federation's Centro de Alto Rendimento.

== Career ==
In June 2018, at the age of 14, Jorge made her professional debut as a wildcard at the $15k Guimarães Ladies Open. In June 2023, she and her sister reached the doubles final of the W25 Guimarães Ladies Open, but lost to Georgina García Pérez and Petra Hule.

In April 2024, she and her sister won the doubles title at the Oeiras Ladies Open, defeating Harriet Dart and Kristina Mladenovic in the final. In September 2024, Matilde won the W35 tournament in Leiria and was a semifinalist at the W35 Santarém Ladies Open. Later that month, the sisters were runners-up in doubles at the Caldas da Rainha Ladies Open and won the doubles title at the Lisboa Belém Open.

In April 2025, the sisters successfully defended their doubles title at the Oeiras Ladies Open, defeating Anastasia Dețiuc and Patricia Maria Țig in the final. That June, Matilde defeated her sister in the final of the W50 XXII Montemor Ladies Open 2 in Montemor-o-Novo. The following week, however, she lost to her sister in the final of the W50 Guimarães Ladies Open. By reaching the final, Matilde overtook her sister as the top ranked Portuguese female singles player, rising to a ranking of world No. 251.

Playing alongside Sofia Costoulas, Jorge won her third WTA 125 doubles title at the 2026 Oeiras CETO Open, defeating Magali Kempen and Lara Salden in the final.

== WTA 125 finals ==
=== Doubles: 4 (4 titles) ===
Result	W–L	Date	Tournament	Surface	Partner	Opponents	Score
Win	1–0	Apr 2024	Oeiras Ladies Open, Portugal	Clay	(Portugal) Francisca Jorge	(United Kingdom) Harriet Dart (France) Kristina Mladenovic	6–0, 6–4
Win	2–0	Apr 2025	Oeiras Ladies Open, Portugal	Clay	(Portugal) Francisca Jorge	(Czech Republic) Anastasia Dețiuc (Romania) Patricia Maria Țig	6–1, 6–2
Win	3–0	Apr 2026	Oeiras CETO Open, Portugal	Clay	(Belgium) Sofia Costoulas	(Belgium) Magali Kempen (Belgium) Lara Salden	6–4, 6–2
Win	4–0	Sep 2026	Porto Open, Portugal	Hard	(Portugal) Francisca Jorge	(Canada) Ariana Arseneault (Canada) Raphaëlle Lacasse	6–3, 3–6, [10–3]

== ITF Circuit finals ==
=== Singles: 8 (3 titles, 5 runner-ups) ===
Legend W40/W50 tournaments (2–2) W25/35 tournaments (1–3)	Finals by surface Hard (3–4) Clay (0–1)

Result	W–L	Date	Tournament	Tier	Surface	Opponent	Score
Win	1–0	Sep 2024	ITF Leiria, Portugal	W35	Hard	(Finland) Anastasia Kulikova	1–6, 6–2, 6–1
Loss	1–1	Oct 2024	ITF Faro, Portugal	W35	Hard	(Poland) Monika Stankiewicz	6–7^{(3)}, 3–6
Loss	1–2	Nov 2024	ITF Lousada, Portugal	W35	Hard (i)	(France) Margaux Rouvroy	5–7, 3–6
Win	2–2	Jun 2025	ITF Montemor-o-Novo, Portugal	W50	Hard	(Portugal) Francisca Jorge	6–1, 6–3
Loss	2–3	Jun 2025	Guimarães Ladies Open, Portugal	W50	Hard	(Portugal) Francisca Jorge	7–5, 2–6, 2–6
Loss	2–4	Aug 2025	ITF Bistrița, Romania	W50	Clay	(Romania) Miriam Bulgaru	0–6, 3–6
Loss	2–5	Jun 2026	ITF Elvas, Portugal	W50	Hard	(China) Shi Han	1–6, 1–6
Win	3–5	Sep 2026	ITF Évora, Portugal	W50	Hard	Anastasia Gasanova	7–5, 6–4

=== Doubles: 53 (30 titles, 23 runner-ups) ===
Legend W100 tournaments (3–3) W60/75 tournaments (8–6) W40/50 tournaments (4–7) W25/35 tournaments (13–7) W15 tournaments (2–0)	Finals by surface Hard (20–15) Clay (9–8) Carpet (1–0)

Result	W–L	Date	Tournament	Tier	Surface	Partner	Opponents	Score
Win	1–0	Oct 2019	ITF Santarém, Portugal	W15	Hard	(Spain) Celia Cerviño Ruiz	(Portugal) Sara Lança (Russia) Ekaterina Shalimova	6–3, 6–2
Loss	1–1	Oct 2021	ITF Loulé, Portugal	W25	Hard	(Portugal) Francisca Jorge	(Greece) Despina Papamichail (Serbia) Natalija Stevanović	2–6, 5–7
Win	2–1	Dec 2021	ITF Lousada, Portugal	W15	Hard (i)	(Spain) Celia Cerviño Ruiz	(Netherlands) Jasmijn Gimbrère (Australia) Alicia Smith	6–1, 6–4
Loss	2–2	Apr 2022	ITF Oeiras, Portugal	W25	Clay	(Portugal) Francisca Jorge	(Spain) Jéssica Bouzas Maneiro (Spain) Guiomar Maristany	6–3, 4–6, [8–10]
Loss	2–3	May 2022	ITF Santa Margherita di Pula, Italy	W25	Clay	(Portugal) Francisca Jorge	(Italy) Angelica Moratelli (Italy) Camilla Rosatello	4–6, 5–7
Win	3–3	May 2022	ITF Santa Margherita di Pula, Italy	W25	Clay	(Portugal) Francisca Jorge	(Italy) Martina Colmegna (Italy) Lisa Pigato	7–5, 0–6, [11–9]
Win	4–3	May 2022	ITF Montemor-o-Novo, Portugal	W25	Hard	(Portugal) Francisca Jorge	(Australia) Alana Parnaby (India) Prarthana Thombare	6–3, 6–4
Loss	4–4	Jun 2022	Internazionali di Caserta, Italy	W60	Clay	(Portugal) Francisca Jorge	(Greece) Despina Papamichail (Italy) Camilla Rosatello	6–4, 2–6, [6–10]
Win	5–4	Jul 2022	ITF Guimarães, Portugal	W25	Hard	(Portugal) Francisca Jorge	(United Kingdom) Sarah Beth Grey (United States) Jamie Loeb	6–3, 6–1
Win	6–4	Sep 2022	ITF Leiria, Portugal	W25	Hard	(Portugal) Francisca Jorge	(South Korea) Choi Ji-hee (Serbia) Natalija Stevanović	6–4, 6–0
Win	7–4	Oct 2022	Lisboa Belém Open, Portugal	W25	Clay	(Portugal) Francisca Jorge	(Spain) Irene Burillo (Spain) Andrea Lázaro García	6–2, 6–2
Win	8–4	Oct 2022	ITF Quinta do Lago, Portugal	W25	Hard	(Portugal) Francisca Jorge	(South Korea) Ku Yeon-woo (Hungary) Adrienn Nagy	6–4, 6–4
Win	9–4	Oct 2022	ITF Loulé, Portugal	W25	Hard	(Portugal) Francisca Jorge	(Chinese Taipei) Lee Pei-chi (Chinese Taipei) Wu Fang-hsien	6–3, 7–5
Win	10–4	Nov 2022	ITF Funchal, Portugal	W25	Hard	(Portugal) Francisca Jorge	(Germany) Joëlle Steur (Netherlands) Stephanie Visscher	5–7, 7–5, [10–7]
Loss	10–5	Feb 2023	Porto Indoor, Portugal	W40	Hard (i)	(Croatia) Tara Würth	(Georgia (country)) Ekaterine Gorgodze (Spain) Leyre Romero Gormaz	4–6, 6–2, [9–11]
Loss	10–6	Mar 2023	ITF Bangalore, India	W25	Hard	(Portugal) Francisca Jorge	(Bosnia and Herzegovina) Dea Herdželaš (United Kingdom) Eden Silva	6–3, 4–6, [7–10]
Win	11–6	Mar 2023	ITF Bangalore, India	W40	Hard	(Portugal) Francisca Jorge	(Greece) Valentini Grammatikopoulou (United Kingdom) Eden Silva	5–7, 6–0, [10–3]
Win	12–6	Mar 2023	ITF Palmanova, Spain	W25	Clay	(Portugal) Francisca Jorge	(Georgia (country)) Ekaterine Gorgodze (Belarus) Iryna Shymanovich	6–1, 3–6, [10–8]
Win	13–6	Mar 2023	ITF Palmanova, Spain	W25	Clay	(Portugal) Francisca Jorge	(Georgia (country)) Ekaterine Gorgodze (Belarus) Iryna Shymanovich	2–6, 6–3, [10–8]
Loss	13–7	Apr 2023	Oeiras Ladies Open, Portugal	W100	Clay	(Portugal) Francisca Jorge	(Norway) Ulrikke Eikeri (Japan) Eri Hozumi	6–4, 4–6, [5–10]
Loss	13–8	May 2023	ITF Platja d'Aro, Spain	W25	Hard	(Portugal) Francisca Jorge	(United States) Ashley Lahey (Australia) Ellen Perez	3–6, 6–3, [10–12]
Loss	13–9	Jun 2023	ITF Guimaraes, Portugal	W25	Hard	(Portugal) Francisca Jorge	(Spain) Georgina García Pérez (Australia) Petra Hule	4–6, 5–7
Win	14–9	Jul 2023	ITF Cantanhede, Portugal	W25	Carpet	(Portugal) Francisca Jorge	(United Kingdom) Madeleine Brooks (United Kingdom) Holly Hutchinson	6–3, 6–3
Loss	14–10	Jul 2023	Porto Indoor, Portugal	W40	Hard (i)	(Portugal) Francisca Jorge	(Australia) Gabriella Da Silva Fick (Australia) Alexandra Osborne	4–6, 3–6
Loss	14–11	Sep 2023	Montreux Ladies Open, Switzerland	W60	Clay	(Portugal) Francisca Jorge	Amina Anshba (Netherlands) Lexie Stevens	6–1, 5–7, [10–12]
Win	15–11	Sep 2023	ITF Leiria, Portugal	W25	Hard	(Portugal) Francisca Jorge	(Belgium) Sofia Costoulas (Switzerland) Jenny Dürst	7–5, 7–6^{(5)}
Win	16–11	Sep 2023	Caldas da Rainha Open, Portugal	W60+H	Hard	(Portugal) Francisca Jorge	(United States) Ashley Lahey (China) Tian Fangran	6–1, 2–6, [10–7]
Loss	16–12	Oct 2023	ITF Quinta do Lago, Portugal	W40	Hard	(Portugal) Francisca Jorge	(Australia) Olivia Gadecki (United Kingdom) Heather Watson	4–6, 1–6
Loss	16–13	Dec 2023	ITF Vacaria, Brazil	W60	Clay (i)	(Portugal) Francisca Jorge	(Peru) Romina Ccuno (Lithuania) Justina Mikulskytė	2–6, 3–6
Loss	16–14	Jan 2024	Porto Indoor 1, Portugal	W50	Hard (i)	(Portugal) Francisca Jorge	(United Kingdom) Sarah Beth Grey (United Kingdom) Olivia Nicholls	6–4, 3–6, [6–10]
Loss	16–15	Jan 2024	Porto Indoor 2, Portugal	W50	Hard (i)	(Portugal) Francisca Jorge	(Slovenia) Veronika Erjavec (Czech Republic) Dominika Šalková	6–4, 5–7, [8–10]
Loss	16–16	Feb 2024	Porto Indoor 3, Portugal	W75	Hard (i)	(Portugal) Francisca Jorge	(Hungary) Anna Bondár (Switzerland) Céline Naef	4–6, 6–3, [9–11]
Win	17–16	Apr 2024	Oeiras CETO Open, Portugal	W100	Clay	(Portugal) Francisca Jorge	Yana Sizikova (Chinese Taipei) Wu Fang-hsien	6–2, 6–0
Loss	17–17	May 2024	ITF Platja d'Aro, Spain	W35	Clay	(Latvia) Diāna Marcinkēviča	(Greece) Eleni Christofi (Latvia) Daniela Vismane	4–6, 2–6
Loss	17–18	Jun 2024	Guimarães Ladies Open, Portugal	W75	Hard	(Portugal) Francisca Jorge	(United States) Sophie Chang (United States) Rasheeda McAdoo	6–7^{(6)}, 7–6^{(2)}, [5–10]
Loss	17–19	Jul 2024	ITF Corroios, Portugal	W50	Hard	(Australia) Elena Micic	(Poland) Martyna Kubka (United States) Anna Rogers	1–6, 4–6
Loss	17–20	Aug 2024	ITF Ourense, Spain	W50	Hard	(United States) Anna Rogers	(Poland) Martyna Kubka (Belgium) Lara Salden	6–3, 3–6, [8–10]
Win	18–20	Sep 2024	ITF Leiria, Portugal	W35	Hard	(United Kingdom) Sarah Beth Grey	(Canada) Bianca Fernandez (Slovakia) Radka Zelníčková	7–6^{(1)}, 6–2
Loss	18–21	Sep 2024	Caldas da Rainha Open, Portugal	W100	Hard	(Portugal) Francisca Jorge	(United Kingdom) Jodie Burrage; Anastasia Tikhonova	6–7^{(3)}, 4–6
Win	19–21	Sep 2024	Lisboa Belém Open, Portugal	W75	Clay	(Portugal) Francisca Jorge	(Spain) Yvonne Cavallé Reimers (Spain) Ángela Fita Boluda	7–6^{(5)}, 6–4
Win	20–21	Oct 2024	ITF Quinta do Lago, Portugal	W50	Hard	(Lithuania) Justina Mikulskytė	(Belgium) Magali Kempen (Belgium) Lara Salden	2–6, 6–4, [14–12]
Win	21–21	Jan 2025	Porto Indoor, Portugal	W50+H	Hard (i)	(Portugal) Francisca Jorge	(Croatia) Lucija Ćirić Bagarić (Slovenia) Kristina Novak	6–3, 6–2
Win	22–21	Feb 2025	ITF Birmingham, UK	W50	Hard (i)	(Portugal) Francisca Jorge	(Slovakia) Viktória Hrunčáková (Poland) Alicja Rosolska	6–2, 4–6, [10–5]
Win	23–21	Mar 2025	Porto Indoor, Portugal	W75	Hard (i)	(Portugal) Francisca Jorge	(Chinese Taipei) Cho I-hsuan (Chinese Taipei) Cho Yi-tsen	0–6, 7–6^{(4)}, [10–8]
Win	24–21	Apr 2025	Oeiras Open, Portugal	W100	Clay	(Portugal) Francisca Jorge	(Serbia) Aleksandra Krunić (United States) Sabrina Santamaria	6–7^{(7)}, 6–1, [1–0] ret.
Win	25–21	May 2025	Zagreb Open, Croatia	W75	Clay	(Portugal) Francisca Jorge	(Croatia) Lucija Ćirić Bagarić; Vitalia Diatchenko	6–2, 6–0
Loss	25–22	Jul 2025	Figueira da Foz Open, Portugal	W100	Hard	(Portugal) Francisca Jorge	(Czech Republic) Aneta Laboutková (Lithuania) Justina Mikulskytė	4–6, 6–3, [6–10]
Loss	25–23	Aug 2025	ITF Kuršumlijska, Serbia	W75	Clay	(Portugal) Francisca Jorge	(Serbia) Natalija Senić (Serbia) Anja Stanković	2–6, 5–7
Win	26–23	Sep 2025	Lisboa Belém Open, Portugal	W100	Clay	(Switzerland) Naïma Karamoko	(Slovenia) Dalila Jakupović (Slovenia) Nika Radišić	6–2, 6–3
Win	27–23	Oct 2025	ITF Quinta do Lago, Portugal	W75	Hard (i)	(Portugal) Francisca Jorge	(Czech Republic) Anna Sisková; Maria Timofeeva	4–6, 7–5, [10–7]
Win	28–23	Jan 2026	Porto Indoor, Portugal	W75	Hard (i)	(Portugal) Francisca Jorge	(Ukraine) Nadiia Kolb (Slovenia) Kristina Novak	6–2, 6–4
Win	29–23	Aug 2026	ITF Ourense, Spain	W75	Hard	(Portugal) Francisca Jorge	(United Kingdom) Freya Christie (United Kingdom) Alicia Dudeney	walkover
Win	30–23	Oct 2026	Internationaux Féminins de la Vienne, France	W75	Hard (i)	(Portugal) Francisca Jorge	(France) Estelle Cascino (China) Feng Shuo	6–2, 7–6^{(6)}
