= 2025 MundoTenis Open =

- Date: 20 – 26 October
- Edition: 3rd
- Category: WTA 125
- Draw: 32S / 13D
- Prize money: $115,000
- Surface: Clay
- Location: Florianópolis, Brazil
- Venue: Super9 Tennis Park, Jurerê Internacional

Champions

Singles
- (Austria) Julia Grabher

Doubles
- (Spain) Irene Burillo / (Georgia (country)) Ekaterine Gorgodze
- MundoTenis Open

The 2025 Engie Open presented by MundoTênis Tours was a professional women's tennis tournament that was played on outdoor clay courts. It was the third edition of the tournament and part of the 2025 WTA 125 tournaments. It took place in Florianópolis, Brazil from 20 to 26 of October, 2025.

Brazilian Laura Pigossi was the defending champion of the doubles draw alongside Polish Maja Chwalińska, that was also the defending champion of the singles draw.

Chwalińska did not participate on this edition, in either singles or doubles. Pigossi played alongside Ingrid Gamarra Martins and lost in the semifinal to Irene Burillo and Ekaterine Gorgodze in three sets.

== Singles main draw entrants ==
=== Seeds ===
Country	Player	Rank^{1}	Seed
ARG	Solana Sierra	71	1
SUI	Simona Waltert	97	2
EGY	Mayar Sherif	103	3
HUN	Panna Udvardy	111	4
AUT	Julia Grabher	117	5
ESP	Leyre Romero Gormaz	134	6
AUT	Sinja Kraus	135	7
UKR	Oleksandra Oliynykova	137	8

- Rankings are as of 13 October 2025

=== Other entrants ===
The following players received wildcards into the singles main draw:

- (Brazil) Ana Candiotto
- (Brazil) Sofia da Cruz Mendonça
- (Brazil) Luiza Fullana
- (Brazil) Nauhany Vitória Leme da Silva

The following players received entry from the qualifying draw:

- (Argentina) Victoria Bosio
- (Brazil) Júlia Konishi Camargo Silva
- (United States) Maribella Zamarripa
- Anastasia Zolotareva

The following player received entry as a lucky loser:

- (Chile) Fernanda Labraña

=== Withdrawals ===
Before the tournament

- (Argentina) María Lourdes Carlé → replaced by (Italy) Miriana Tona
- (Poland) Maja Chwalińska → replaced by (Australia) Tina Smith
- (Croatia) Tara Würth → replaced by (Chile) Fernanda Labraña (LL)

== Doubles main draw entrants ==
=== Seeds ===
Country	Player	Country	Player	Rank^{1}	Seed
BRA	Ingrid Martins	BRA	Laura Pigossi	157	1
~~ITA~~	~~Nicole Fossa Huergo~~	~~CRO~~	~~Tara Würth~~	~~273~~	~~2~~
~~EGY~~	~~Mayar Sherif~~	~~HUN~~	~~Panna Udvardy~~	~~339~~	~~3~~
ESP	Irene Burillo	GEO	Ekaterine Gorgodze	468	4
FRA	Carole Monnet	BDI	Sada Nahimana	490	5
VEN	Andrea Gámiz	NED	Eva Vedder	503	6

- Rankings are as of 13 October 2025

== Champions ==
=== Singles ===
- (Austria) Julia Grabher def. (France) Carole Monnet, 3–6, 6–4, 6–0

=== Doubles ===
- (Spain) Irene Burillo / (Georgia (country)) Ekaterine Gorgodze def. (France) Carole Monnet / (Burundi) Sada Nahimana, 6–1, 6–4
