= 2026 Open Arena Les Sables d'Olonne =

- Date: 16–22 February
- Edition: 1st
- Category: WTA 125
- Prize money: €100,000
- Surface: Hard (indoor)
- Location: Les Sables d'Olonne, France

Champions

Singles
- (Czech Republic) Dominika Šalková

Doubles
- (United States) Carol Young Suh Lee / (Czech Republic) Anna Sisková
- Open Arena Les Sables d'Olonne

The 2026 Open Arena Les Sables d'Olonne was a professional women's tennis tournament played on indoor hard courts. It was the first edition of the tournament and part of the 2026 WTA 125 tournaments. It took place at the ARENA Stadium in Les Sables d'Olonne, France between 16 and 22 February 2026.

== Singles main-draw entrants ==
=== Seeds ===
| Country | Player | Rank^{1} | Seed |
|---|---|---|---|
| LAT | Darja Semeņistaja | 98 | 1 |
| GER | Tamara Korpatsch | 102 | 2 |
| BEL | Greet Minnen | 127 | 3 |
| ITA | Lucrezia Stefanini | 138 | 4 |
| SRB | Lola Radivojević | 139 | 5 |
| BEL | Sofia Costoulas | 141 | 6 |
| ITA | Lucia Bronzetti | 142 | 7 |
| CZE | Dominika Šalková | 150 | 8 |

- ^{1} Rankings are as of 9 February 2026.

=== Other entrants ===
The following players received wildcards into the singles main draw:

- (France) Océane Dodin
- ~~(France) Ksenia Efremova~~
- (France) Fiona Ferro
- (France) Kristina Mladenovic

The following players received entry from the qualifying draw:

- Ekaterina Kazionova
- (France) Astrid Lew Yan Foon
- (France) Diana Martynov
- (China) Yang Yidi

The following player received entry into the main draw as a lucky loser:

- (France) Tiphanie Lemaître

=== Withdrawals ===
Before the tournament

- (Italy) Silvia Ambrosio → replaced by (Cyprus) Raluca Șerban
- (France) Ksenia Efremova → replaced by (France) Tiphanie Lemaître (LL)
- (China) Gao Xinyu → replaced by (Ukraine) Anastasiia Sobolieva
- (North Macedonia) Lina Gjorcheska → replaced by (Italy) Camilla Rosatello
- (Georgia (country)) Ekaterine Gorgodze → replaced by (Spain) Aliona Bolsova
- (United States) Varvara Lepchenko → replaced by (Czech Republic) Anna Sisková
- (France) Diane Parry → replaced by (France) Harmony Tan
- (China) Wang Xiyu → replaced by (Spain) Irene Burillo

=== Retirements ===
- (Spain) Irene Burillo (illness)
- (France) Kristina Mladenovic (abductor injury)
- (China) Darja Semeņistaja (right ankle injury)

== Doubles entrants ==
=== Seeds ===
| Country | Player | Country | Player | Rank^{1} | Seed |
|---|---|---|---|---|---|
| FRA | Estelle Cascino | CHN | Feng Shuo | 225 | 1 |
| GBR | Madeleine Brooks | ITA | Angelica Moratelli | 240 | 2 |

- ^{1} Rankings as of 26 January 2026.

=== Withdrawal ===
During the tournament

- (Italy) Camilla Rosatello / (Latvia) Darja Semeņistaja (Semeņistaja – ankle injury)

== Champions ==
=== Singles ===
- (Czech Republic) Dominika Šalková def. (Spain) Andrea Lázaro García 6–4, 6–0

=== Doubles ===
- (United States) Carol Young Suh Lee / (Czech Republic) Anna Sisková def. (Spain) Aliona Bolsova / (Spain) Irene Burillo 6–2, 6–3
