= 2026 Open Arena Les Sables d'Olonne – Singles =

Singles
- 2026 Open Arena Les Sables d'Olonne

Final
- Champion: (Czech Republic) Dominika Šalková
- Runner-up: (Spain) Andrea Lázaro García
- Score: 6–4, 6–0

Details
- Draw: 32 (4Q / 4WC)
- Seeds: 8

Events
Singles	Doubles
- Open Arena Les Sables d'Olonne

This is the first edition of the tournament.

Dominika Šalková won the title, defeating Andrea Lázaro García 6–4, 6–0 in the final.

== Seeds ==
1. (Latvia) Darja Semeņistaja (first round, retired)
2. (Germany) Tamara Korpatsch (first round)
3. (Belgium) Greet Minnen (first round)
4. (Italy) Lucrezia Stefanini (first round)
5. (Serbia) Lola Radivojević (first round)
6. (Belgium) Sofia Costoulas (quarterfinals)
7. (Italy) Lucia Bronzetti (first round)
8. (Czech Republic) Dominika Šalková (champion)

== Draw ==
Key

- Q = Qualifier
- WC = Wild card
- LL = Lucky loser
- Alt = Alternate
- ITF = ITF entry
- PR = Protected ranking
- SR = Special ranking
- SE = Special exempt
- JE = Junior exempt
- JR = Junior Accelerator Programme entrant
- CO = College Accelerator Programme entrant
- NG = Next Gen Accelerator Program entrant
- w/o = Walkover
- r = Retired
- d = Defaulted

=== Finals ===
Semifinals
Alina Korneeva	6^{5}	2
8	(Czech Republic) Dominika Šalková	7^{7}	6
WC	(France) Fiona Ferro	2	2
(Spain) Andrea Lázaro García	6	6

Final
8	(Czech Republic) Dominika Šalková	6	6
(Spain) Andrea Lázaro García	4	0

=== Top half ===
First round
1	(Latvia) D Semeņistaja	3	1^{r}
(Spain) A Bolsova	6	3
(Germany) A-L Friedsam	3	3
(United States) CYS Lee	6	6
(Spain) I Burillo	1	1^{r}
(France) H Tan	6	4
A Korneeva	4	6	6
5	(Serbia) L Radivojević	6	2	4
3	(Belgium) G Minnen	4	6	3
(Italy) C Rosatello	6	3	6
LL	(France) T Lemaître	6	0	0
(Germany) M Barthel	4	6	6
(Czech Republic) A Sisková	6	6
(France) J Ponchet	3	3
(Ukraine) A Sobolieva	5	1
8	(Czech Republic) D Šalková	7	6

Second round
(Spain) A Bolsova	2	5
(United States) CYS Lee	6	7
(France) H Tan	3	0
A Korneeva	6	6
(Italy) C Rosatello	1	7^{7}	1
(Germany) M Barthel	6	6^{5}	6
(Czech Republic) A Sisková	1	6^{3}
8	(Czech Republic) D Šalková	6	7^{7}

Quarterfinals
(United States) CYS Lee	1	2
A Korneeva	6	6
(Germany) M Barthel	6	4	2
8	(Czech Republic) D Šalková	2	6	6

Semifinals
A Korneeva	6^{5}	2
8	(Czech Republic) D Šalková	7^{7}	6

=== Bottom half ===
First round
6	(Belgium) S Costoulas	6	6
(France) C Paquet	1	2
Q	E Kazionova	4	2
Q	(France) A Lew Yan Foon	6	6
Q	(China) Y Yang	3	7^{7}	6^{2}
WC	(France) K Mladenovic	6	6^{2}	7^{7}
WC	(France) F Ferro	6	6
4	(Italy) L Stefanini	2	4
7	(Italy) L Bronzetti	5	1
(Spain) A Lázaro García	7	6
(France) M Léonard	7^{7}	6
(Cyprus) R Șerban	6^{2}	4
(Italy) L Pigato	1	4
Q	(France) D Martynov	6	6
WC	(France) O Dodin	6	6
2	(Germany) T Korpatsch	2	2

Second round
6	(Belgium) S Costoulas	6	6
Q	(France) A Lew Yan Foon	2	2
WC	(France) K Mladenovic	1	2^{r}
WC	(France) F Ferro	6	3
(Spain) A Lázaro García	3	6	7
(France) M Léonard	6	4	5
Q	(France) D Martynov	4	6	7
WC	(France) O Dodin	6	0	5

Quarterfinals
6	(Belgium) S Costoulas	4	3
WC	(France) F Ferro	6	6
(Spain) A Lázaro García	6	6
Q	(France) D Martynov	4	3

Semifinals
WC	(France) F Ferro	2	2
(Spain) A Lázaro García	6	6

== Qualifying ==
=== Seeds ===
1. (France) Tiphanie Lemaître (qualifying competition, lucky loser)
2. (China) Yang Yidi (qualified)
3. Ekaterina Kazionova (qualified)
4. (France) Astrid Lew Yan Foon (qualified)

=== Qualifiers ===
1. (France) Diana Martynov
2. (China) Yang Yidi
3. Ekaterina Kazionova
4. (France) Astrid Lew Yan Foon

=== Lucky loser ===
1. (France) Tiphanie Lemaître

=== Qualifying draw ===
==== First qualifier ====
Qualifying competition
1	(France) Tiphanie Lemaître	5	6	2
	(France) Diana Martynov	7	3	6

==== Second qualifier ====
Qualifying competition
2	(China) Yang Yidi	6	7^{12}
	(United Kingdom) Alicia Dudeney	4	6^{10}

==== Third qualifier ====
Qualifying competition
3	Ekaterina Kazionova	6	7
WC	(France) Mallaurie Noël	2	5

==== Fourth qualifier ====
Qualifying competition
4	(France) Astrid Lew Yan Foon	6	6
	(France) Nahia Berecoechea	3	2
