= MundoTenis Open =

WTA 125 tournament

Engie Open

WTA 125K series
- Event name: Engie Open presented by MundoTênis Tours
- Founded: 2023; 3 years ago
- Editions: 3 (2025)
- Location: Florianópolis; Brazil
- Venue: Super9 Tennis Park, Jurerê Internacional
- Category: WTA 125
- Surface: Clay (outdoor)
- Draw: 32S / 8Q / 13D
- Prize money: $115,000
- Website: wtaflorianopolis.com

Current champions (2025)
- Singles: (Austria) Julia Grabher
- Doubles: (Spain) Irene Burillo (Georgia (country)) Ekaterine Gorgodze

Engie Open presented by MundoTênis Tours (previously known as the MundoTênis Open) is a WTA 125 event held in Florianópolis, Brazil and until the first edition of the SP Open in 2025, was the tournament on the highest level of the women's tennis professional tour in Brazil, and the only one outside of the ITF Women's circuit. The inaugural Challenger-level event took place in 2023 after a six year absence of Brazil from the tour.

Although this tournament is played on outdoor clay courts, the 2024 doubles final was played on an indoor clay court due to rain. Laura Pigossi, winner of the doubles title in 2024, was the first Brazilian to win a trophy at the event. Polish Maja Chwalińska, winner of singles and doubles in 2024, was the first to win both trophies and also to do so in the same edition.

== Finals ==
=== Singles ===
Location	Year	Champion	Runner-up	Score
Florianópolis	2023	(Australia) Ajla Tomljanović	(Argentina) Martina Capurro Taborda	6–1, 7–5
Florianópolis	2024	(Poland) Maja Chwalińska	(Switzerland) Ylena In-Albon	6–1, 6–2
Florianópolis	2025	(Austria) Julia Grabher	(France) Carole Monnet	3–6, 6–4, 6–0

=== Doubles ===
Location	Year	Champions	Runners-up	Score
Florianópolis
Florianópolis	2023	(Italy) Sara Errani (France) Léolia Jeanjean	(Germany) Julia Lohoff (Switzerland) Conny Perrin	7–5, 3–6, [10–7]
Florianópolis	2024	(Poland) Maja Chwalińska (Brazil) Laura Pigossi	(Italy) Nicole Fossa Huergo (Ukraine) Valeriya Strakhova	7–6^{(7–3)}, 6–3
Florianópolis	2025	(Spain) Irene Burillo (Georgia (country)) Ekaterine Gorgodze	(France) Carole Monnet (Burundi) Sada Nahimana	6–1, 6–4
