= 2026 French Open – Women's singles qualifying =

Women's singles qualifying
- 2026 French Open

Events
Singles	men	women		boys	girls
Doubles	men	women	mixed	boys	girls
WC Singles	men	women	quad	boys	girls
WC Doubles	men	women	quad	boys	girls

Qualification
Singles	men	women
- French Open

The 2026 French Open – Women's singles qualifying was a series of tennis matches that took place from 18 to 23 May 2026 to determine the sixteen qualifiers into the main draw of the women's singles tournament.

Only 16 out of the 128 qualifiers who compete in this knock-out tournament, secure a main draw place.

This marked the first time former world No. 1 Karolína Plíšková contested a major qualifying competition since the 2012 US Open. She lost in the second round to Marina Bassols Ribera.

== Seeds ==
All seeds are per WTA rankings as of 4 May 2026.

1. (Thailand) Lanlana Tararudee (first round)
2. (Austria) Sinja Kraus (qualified)
3. (United States) Ashlyn Krueger (qualified)
4. (Czech Republic) Darja Vidmanova (first round)
5. (New Zealand) Lulu Sun (qualifying competition)
6. (Andorra) Victoria Jiménez Kasintseva (first round)
7. (Latvia) Darja Semeņistaja (second round)
8. (Poland) Maja Chwalińska (qualified, main draw finalist)
9. (Egypt) Mayar Sherif (qualified)
10. (China) Yuan Yue (first round)
11. (Slovenia) Kaja Juvan (second round)
12. (Czech Republic) Dominika Šalková (second round)
13. (Slovakia) Rebecca Šramková (qualified)
14. Aliaksandra Sasnovich (qualifying competition)
15. Alina Korneeva (qualified)
16. (Uzbekistan) Polina Kudermetova (qualifying competition)
17. (Netherlands) Suzan Lamens (qualifying competition)
18. Alina Charaeva (first round)
19. (Australia) Taylah Preston (first round)
20. (Czech Republic) Karolína Plíšková (second round)
21. (Japan) Himeno Sakatsume (qualifying competition)
22. (Slovenia) Tamara Zidanšek (second round)
23. (Australia) Priscilla Hon (first round)
24. (Uzbekistan) Maria Timofeeva (second round)
25. (Canada) Bianca Andreescu (second round)
26. (Poland) Katarzyna Kawa (second round)
27. (Spain) Kaitlin Quevedo (qualified)
28. (United States) Elvina Kalieva (first round)
29. (Italy) Lisa Pigato (second round)
30. (China) Wang Xiyu (qualified)
31. (Australia) Maddison Inglis (first round)
32. (Serbia) Lola Radivojević (second round)

== Qualifiers ==
1. (China) Guo Hanyu
2. (Austria) Sinja Kraus
3. (United States) Ashlyn Krueger
4. (Czech Republic) Linda Fruhvirtová
5. (United States) Claire Liu
6. Elena Pridankina
7. (Italy) Lucia Bronzetti
8. (Poland) Maja Chwalińska
9. (Egypt) Mayar Sherif
10. (United States) Sloane Stephens
11. (Spain) Kaitlin Quevedo
12. (Switzerland) Susan Bandecchi
13. (Slovakia) Rebecca Šramková
14. (Spain) Marina Bassols Ribera
15. Alina Korneeva
16. (China) Wang Xiyu

== Draw ==
Key

- Q = Qualifier
- WC = Wild card
- LL = Lucky loser
- Alt = Alternate
- ITF = ITF entry
- PR = Protected ranking
- SR = Special ranking
- SE = Special exempt
- JE = Junior exempt
- JR = Junior Accelerator Programme entrant
- CO = College Accelerator Programme entrant
- NG = Next Gen Accelerator Program entrant
- w/o = Walkover
- r = Retired
- d = Defaulted

=== First qualifier ===
First round
1	(Thailand) Lanlana Tararudee	6	3	3
(Greece) Despina Papamichail	1	6	6
(Romania) Miriam Bulgaru	5	0
(China) Guo Hanyu	7	6
(Belgium) Sofia Costoulas	6	6
PR	(Croatia) Tereza Mrdeža	0	2
(Japan) Mai Hontama	7	6
19	(Australia) Taylah Preston	5	3

Second round
(Greece) Despina Papamichail	2	6^{8}
(China) Guo Hanyu	6	7^{10}
(Belgium) Sofia Costoulas	6	6
(Japan) Mai Hontama	4	3

Qualifying competition
(China) Guo Hanyu	6	6
(Belgium) Sofia Costoulas	3	4

=== Second qualifier ===
First round
2	(Austria) Sinja Kraus	7	3	6
(Switzerland) Céline Naef	5	6	2
(Germany) Noma Noha Akugue	7	7^{7}
Tatiana Prozorova	5	6^{2}
(Germany) Mona Barthel	5	6	2
(Germany) Anna-Lena Friedsam	7	2	6
(Georgia (country)) Ekaterine Gorgodze	6	4	4
22	(Slovenia) Tamara Zidanšek	0	6	6

Second round
2	(Austria) Sinja Kraus	6^{5}	6	7
(Germany) Noma Noha Akugue	7^{7}	0	5
(Germany) Anna-Lena Friedsam	6	6
22	(Slovenia) Tamara Zidanšek	3	4

Qualifying competition
2	(Austria) Sinja Kraus	6	6
(Germany) Anna-Lena Friedsam	1	1

=== Third qualifier ===
First round
3	(United States) Ashlyn Krueger	6	6
WC	(France) Margaux Rouvroy	4	3
(Argentina) Luisina Giovannini	6	6
(Spain) Eva Guerrero Álvarez	0	2
(United States) Mary Stoiana	3	6	6
WC	(France) Séléna Janicijevic	6	4	4
(Portugal) Matilde Jorge	7^{7}	7
28	(United States) Elvina Kalieva	6^{4}	5

Second round
3	(United States) Ashlyn Krueger	6	6
(Argentina) Luisina Giovannini	4	3
(United States) Mary Stoiana	6	6
(Portugal) Matilde Jorge	4	4

Qualifying competition
3	(United States) Ashlyn Krueger	6^{4}	6	6
(United States) Mary Stoiana	7^{7}	3	1

=== Fourth qualifier ===
First round
4	(Czech Republic) Darja Vidmanova	3	1
(China) Gao Xinyu	6	6
(France) Harmony Tan	6	6
PR	(India) Karman Thandi	1	0
(Czech Republic) Linda Fruhvirtová	6	6^{2}	6
(Czech Republic) Lucie Havlíčková	3	7^{7}	3
(France) Jessika Ponchet	7	6
23	(Australia) Priscilla Hon	5	2

Second round
(China) Gao Xinyu	3	7	3
(France) Harmony Tan	6	5	6
(Czech Republic) Linda Fruhvirtová	6	6
(France) Jessika Ponchet	1	4

Qualifying competition
(France) Harmony Tan	3	6^{4}
(Czech Republic) Linda Fruhvirtová	6	7^{7}

=== Fifth qualifier ===
First round
5	(New Zealand) Lulu Sun	2	6	6
(China) Ma Yexin	6	3	2
(Belgium) Jeline Vandromme	5	5
(Japan) Aoi Ito	7	7
(Brazil) Laura Pigossi	1	1
(United States) Claire Liu	6	6
(United States) Ayana Akli	2	6^{4}
26	(Poland) Katarzyna Kawa	6	7^{7}

Second round
5	(New Zealand) Lulu Sun	6	6
(Japan) Aoi Ito	3	3
(United States) Claire Liu	6	6
26	(Poland) Katarzyna Kawa	3	0

Qualifying competition
5	(New Zealand) Lulu Sun	1	0
(United States) Claire Liu	6	6

=== Sixth qualifier ===
First round
6	(Andorra) Victoria Jiménez Kasintseva	7^{7}	2	4
Elena Pridankina	6^{3}	6	6
WC	(France) Eleejah Inisan	2	3
Julia Avdeeva	6	6
(Liechtenstein) Kathinka von Deichmann	6	6^{3}	6
(Chinese Taipei) Joanna Garland	2	7^{7}	1
WC	(France) Manon Léonard	1	0
21	(Japan) Himeno Sakatsume	6	6

Second round
Elena Pridankina	7	6
Julia Avdeeva	5	1
(Liechtenstein) Kathinka von Deichmann	3	6	3
21	(Japan) Himeno Sakatsume	6	2	6

Qualifying competition
Elena Pridankina	6	6
21	(Japan) Himeno Sakatsume	2	1

=== Seventh qualifier ===
First round
7	(Latvia) Darja Semeņistaja	6	6
Iryna Shymanovich	4	0
(Ukraine) Katarina Zavatska	6	6
PR	(Canada) Carol Zhao	2	1
(Italy) Lucia Bronzetti	6	4	7^{10}
(United States) Varvara Lepchenko	2	6	6^{7}
(Italy) Lucrezia Stefanini	6	7
18	Alina Charaeva	4	5

Second round
7	(Latvia) Darja Semeņistaja	5	7	2
(Ukraine) Katarina Zavatska	7	5	6
(Italy) Lucia Bronzetti	6	6
(Italy) Lucrezia Stefanini	4	1

Qualifying competition
(Ukraine) Katarina Zavatska	6	6^{4}	0^{r}
(Italy) Lucia Bronzetti	3	7^{7}	3

=== Eighth qualifier ===
First round
8	(Poland) Maja Chwalińska	6	6
(France) Alice Ramé	0	3
Polina Iatcenko	4	6	6^{4}
(France) Carole Monnet	6	4	7^{10}
(Bulgaria) Elizara Yaneva	6	3	4
(Romania) Irina-Camelia Begu	2	6	6
(North Macedonia) Lina Gjorcheska	4	3
17	(Netherlands) Suzan Lamens	6	6

Second round
8	(Poland) Maja Chwalińska	6	6
(France) Carole Monnet	0	1
(Romania) Irina-Camelia Begu	4	7^{9}	3
17	(Netherlands) Suzan Lamens	6	6^{7}	6

Qualifying competition
8	(Poland) Maja Chwalińska	7^{7}	7
17	(Netherlands) Suzan Lamens	6^{4}	5

=== Ninth qualifier ===
First round
9	(Egypt) Mayar Sherif	6	3	6
(Spain) Andrea Lázaro García	4	6	4
(Czech Republic) Gabriela Knutson	6	0	2
PR	(Italy) Martina Trevisan	2	6	6
(Belgium) Greet Minnen	6	7
Anastasia Gasanova	3	5
(Poland) Linda Klimovičová	3	4
32	(Serbia) Lola Radivojević	6	6

Second round
9	(Egypt) Mayar Sherif	6^{6}	7	6
PR	(Italy) Martina Trevisan	7^{8}	5	1
(Belgium) Greet Minnen	6	6
32	(Serbia) Lola Radivojević	1	2

Qualifying competition
9	(Egypt) Mayar Sherif	6	6
(Belgium) Greet Minnen	3	0

=== Tenth qualifier ===
First round
10	(China) Yuan Yue	7	4	2
(United Kingdom) Harriet Dart	5	6	6
(Mexico) Ana Sofía Sánchez	4	1
(Spain) Leyre Romero Gormaz	6	6
PR	(United States) Sloane Stephens	6	6
(United States) Carol Young Suh Lee	3	2
Aliona Falei	1	3
29	(Italy) Lisa Pigato	6	6

Second round
(United Kingdom) Harriet Dart	1	4
(Spain) Leyre Romero Gormaz	6	6
PR	(United States) Sloane Stephens	6	6
29	(Italy) Lisa Pigato	4	1

Qualifying competition
(Spain) Leyre Romero Gormaz	6	2	1
PR	(United States) Sloane Stephens	3	6	6

=== Eleventh qualifier ===
First round
11	(Slovenia) Kaja Juvan	7	4	6
(Czech Republic) Anna Sisková	5	6	3
(Spain) Guiomar Maristany	6	6
(France) Julie Belgraver	4	1
(Serbia) Teodora Kostović	6	6
(United States) Elizabeth Mandlik	2	2
(Italy) Nuria Brancaccio	6	1	5
27	(Spain) Kaitlin Quevedo	4	6	7

Second round
11	(Slovenia) Kaja Juvan	4	4
(Spain) Guiomar Maristany	6	6
(Serbia) Teodora Kostović	6^{3}	6	2
27	(Spain) Kaitlin Quevedo	7^{7}	3	6

Qualifying competition
(Spain) Guiomar Maristany	6	4	3
27	(Spain) Kaitlin Quevedo	3	6	6

=== Twelfth qualifier ===
First round
12	(Czech Republic) Dominika Šalková	6	6
(Ukraine) Veronika Podrez	2	4
(Switzerland) Susan Bandecchi	2	7	6
WC	(France) Chloé Paquet	6	5	4
(Canada) Katherine Sebov	0	6^{3}
(Slovakia) Viktória Hrunčáková	6	7^{7}
WC	(France) Daphnée Mpetshi Perricard	3	2
25	(Canada) Bianca Andreescu	6	6

Second round
12	(Czech Republic) Dominika Šalková	3	6	5
(Switzerland) Susan Bandecchi	6	4	7
(Slovakia) Viktória Hrunčáková	6^{2}	6	6
25	(Canada) Bianca Andreescu	7^{7}	4	4

Qualifying competition
(Switzerland) Susan Bandecchi	6	6
(Slovakia) Viktória Hrunčáková	1	2

=== Thirteenth qualifier ===
First round
13	(Slovakia) Rebecca Šramková	6	6
(Canada) Kayla Cross	4	0
(Portugal) Francisca Jorge	6	6
(China) You Xiaodi	2	3
(Switzerland) Rebeka Masarova	3	6	3
(Argentina) María Lourdes Carlé	6	4	6
(Canada) Cadence Brace	1	3
24	(Uzbekistan) Maria Timofeeva	6	6

Second round
13	(Slovakia) Rebecca Šramková	6	6
(Portugal) Francisca Jorge	3	4
(Argentina) María Lourdes Carlé	2	6	6
24	(Uzbekistan) Maria Timofeeva	6	0	4

Qualifying competition
13	(Slovakia) Rebecca Šramková	6	5	6
(Argentina) María Lourdes Carlé	4	7	2

=== Fourteenth qualifier ===
First round
14	Aliaksandra Sasnovich	6	6
(United States) Whitney Osuigwe	4	3
(United States) Kayla Day	4	6	6^{13}
PR	(France) Océane Dodin	6	2	7^{15}
WC	(France) Amandine Monnot	2	1
(Spain) Marina Bassols Ribera	6	6
(South Korea) Ku Yeon-woo	6	3	1
20	(Czech Republic) Karolína Plíšková	0	6	6

Second round
14	Aliaksandra Sasnovich	6	6
PR	(France) Océane Dodin	1	0
(Spain) Marina Bassols Ribera	6	6
20	(Czech Republic) Karolína Plíšková	3	2

Qualifying competition
14	Aliaksandra Sasnovich	6^{4}	5
(Spain) Marina Bassols Ribera	7^{7}	7

=== Fifteenth qualifier ===
First round
15	Alina Korneeva	6	7^{7}
(Japan) Nao Hibino	3	6^{3}
(Netherlands) Arantxa Rus	4	6	6^{10}
(Argentina) Jazmín Ortenzi	6	1	7^{12}
(Argentina) Julia Riera	6	6^{7}	6
(Czech Republic) Laura Samson	4	7^{9}	1
PR	(United States) Robin Montgomery	6	7
31	(Australia) Maddison Inglis	1	5

Second round
15	Alina Korneeva	4	6	6
(Argentina) Jazmín Ortenzi	6	4	2
(Argentina) Julia Riera	2	6	6
PR	(United States) Robin Montgomery	6	2	1

Qualifying competition
15	Alina Korneeva	6	6
(Argentina) Julia Riera	3	2

=== Sixteenth qualifier ===
First round
16	(Uzbekistan) Polina Kudermetova	6	7^{7}
(Netherlands) Anouk Koevermans	1	6^{5}
(Spain) Irene Burillo	2	6	2
(Bulgaria) Viktoriya Tomova	6	4	6
WC	(Australia) Tahlia Kokkinis	3	1
(Australia) Storm Hunter	6	6
WC	(France) Kristina Mladenovic	3	1
30	(China) Wang Xiyu	6	6

Second round
16	(Uzbekistan) Polina Kudermetova	7^{7}	6^{5}	6
(Bulgaria) Viktoriya Tomova	6^{2}	7^{7}	3
(Australia) Storm Hunter	2	5
30	(China) Wang Xiyu	6	7

Qualifying competition
16	(Uzbekistan) Polina Kudermetova	3	3
30	(China) Wang Xiyu	6	6
