= 2025 MundoTenis Open – Singles =

Singles
- 2025 MundoTenis Open

Final
- Champion: (Austria) Julia Grabher
- Runner-up: (France) Carole Monnet
- Score: 3–6, 6–4, 6–0

Details
- Draw: 32
- Seeds: 8

Events
Singles	Doubles
- MundoTenis Open

Julia Grabher won the title, defeating Carole Monnet in the final, 3–6, 6–4, 6–0.

Maja Chwalińska was the reigning champion but withdrew before the tournament began.

== Seeds ==
1. (Argentina) Solana Sierra (second round)
2. (Switzerland) Simona Waltert (quarterfinals)
3. (Egypt) Mayar Sherif (first round)
4. (Hungary) Panna Udvardy (quarterfinals)
5. (Austria) Julia Grabher (champion)
6. (Spain) Leyre Romero Gormaz (quarterfinals)
7. (Austria) Sinja Kraus (semifinals)
8. (Ukraine) Oleksandra Oliynykova (semifinals)

== Draw ==
Key

- Q = Qualifier
- WC = Wild card
- LL = Lucky loser
- Alt = Alternate
- ITF = ITF entry
- PR = Protected ranking
- SR = Special ranking
- SE = Special exempt
- JE = Junior exempt
- JR = Junior Accelerator Programme entrant
- CO = College Accelerator Programme entrant
- NG = Next Gen Accelerator Program entrant
- w/o = Walkover
- r = Retired
- d = Defaulted

=== Finals ===
Semifinals
(France) Carole Monnet	2	7	6
7	(Austria) Sinja Kraus	6	5	4
8	(Ukraine) Oleksandra Oliynykova	6	6^{4}	6^{1}
5	(Austria) Julia Grabher	3	7^{7}	7^{7}

Final
(France) Carole Monnet	6	4	0
5	(Austria) Julia Grabher	3	6	6

=== Top half ===
First round
1	(Argentina) S Sierra	7^{8}	6
(Brazil) C Alves	6^{6}	0
(Italy) N Fossa Huergo	6	3	0
(France) C Monnet	4	6	6
(Georgia (country)) E Gorgodze	6	6
(Italy) M Tona	3	1
Q	(Brazil) J Konishi Camargo Silva	1	1
6	(Spain) L Romero Gormaz	6	6
3	(Egypt) M Sherif	6	4	5
(France) A Ramé	2	6	7
LL	(Chile) F Labraña	1	1
(Brazil) L Pigossi	6	6
Q	A Zolotareva	7^{7}	6
(Netherlands) E Vedder	6^{3}	2
WC	(Brazil) A Candiotto	2	1
7	(Austria) S Kraus	6	6

Second round
1	(Argentina) S Sierra	2	4
(France) C Monnet	6	6
(Georgia (country)) E Gorgodze	2	2
6	(Spain) L Romero Gormaz	6	6
(France) A Ramé	6	6
(Brazil) L Pigossi	2	3
Q	A Zolotareva	2	3
7	(Austria) S Kraus	6	6

Quarterfinals
(France) C Monnet	6	6
6	(Spain) L Romero Gormaz	2	4
(France) A Ramé	1	6	4
7	(Austria) S Kraus	6	3	6

Semifinals
(France) C Monnet	2	7	6
7	(Austria) S Kraus	6	5	4

=== Bottom half ===
First round
8	(Ukraine) O Oliynykova	6	6
(Argentina) L Giovannini	2	0
(Argentina) J Riera	6^{2}	6	6
PR	(Slovenia) P Hercog	7^{7}	4	2
Q	(Argentina) V Bosio	6	7
WC	(Brazil) L Fullana	1	5
(Australia) T Smith	2	4
4	(Hungary) P Udvardy	6	6
5	(Austria) J Grabher	5	6	7^{7}
WC	(Brazil) NV Leme da Silva	7	1	6^{3}
WC	(Brazil) S da Cruz Mendonça	3	3
(Burundi) S Nahimana	6	6
(Spain) I Burillo	6	7
Q	(United States) M Zamarripa	1	5
(Brazil) G Cé	2	4
2	(Switzerland) S Waltert	6	6

Second round
8	(Ukraine) O Oliynykova	6	7^{7}
(Argentina) J Riera	4	6^{5}
Q	(Argentina) V Bosio	5	6	3
4	(Hungary) P Udvardy	7	4	6
5	(Austria) J Grabher	6	6
(Burundi) S Nahimana	2	1
(Spain) I Burillo	5	4
2	(Switzerland) S Waltert	7	6

Quarterfinals
8	(Ukraine) O Oliynykova	7^{7}	7^{7}
4	(Hungary) P Udvardy	6^{3}	6^{4}
5	(Austria) J Grabher	6	6
2	(Switzerland) S Waltert	4	3

Semifinals
8	(Ukraine) O Oliynykova	6	6^{4}	6^{1}
5	(Austria) J Grabher	3	7^{7}	7^{7}

== Qualifying ==
=== Seeds ===
1. (Italy) Miriana Tona (moved to main draw)
2. (Argentina) Victoria Bosio (qualified)
3. Anastasia Zolotareva (qualified)
4. (Chile) Fernanda Labraña (qualifying competition, lucky loser)

=== Qualifiers ===
1. (United States) Maribella Zamarripa
2. (Argentina) Victoria Bosio
3. Anastasia Zolotareva
4. (Brazil) Júlia Konishi Camargo Silva

=== Lucky loser ===
1. (Chile) Fernanda Labraña

=== Qualifying draw ===
==== First qualifier ====
Qualifying competition
Alt	(United States) Maribella Zamarripa	6	6
WC	(Brazil) Maria Eduarda Carbone dos Santos	3	3

==== Second qualifier ====
Qualifying competition
2	(Argentina) Victoria Bosio	7	6
	(Bolivia) Noelia Zeballos	5	1

==== Third qualifier ====
Qualifying competition
3	Anastasia Zolotareva	6	6
	(Liechtenstein) Sylvie Zünd	4	4

==== Fourth qualifier ====
Qualifying competition
4	(Chile) Fernanda Labraña	6	6^{2}	3
WC	(Brazil) Júlia Konishi Camargo Silva	1	7^{7}	6
