= Open Arena Les Sables d'Olonne =

- 2026 Open Arena Les Sables d'Olonne

WTA 125
- Event name: Open Arena Les Sables d'Olonne
- Tour: WTA Tour
- Founded: 2026
- Location: Les Sables d'Olonne; France
- Venue: ARENA Stadium
- Category: WTA 125
- Surface: Hard (Indoor)
- Draw: 32S / 7D
- Prize money: €100,000 (2026)
- Website: Official

Current champions (2026)
- Women's singles: (Czech Republic) Dominika Šalková
- Women's doubles: (United States) Carol Young Suh Lee (Czech Republic) Anna Sisková

The Open Arena Les Sables d'Olonne is a WTA 125-level professional women's tennis tournament. It takes place on indoor hardcourts at ARENA Stadium in the city of Les Sables d'Olonne in France. Jo-Wilfried Tsonga is the tournament ambassador.

== Results ==
=== Singles ===
Year	Champion	Runner-up	Score
2026	(Czech Republic) Dominika Šalková	(Spain) Andrea Lázaro García	6–4, 6–0

=== Doubles ===
Year	Champions	Runners-up	Score
2026	(United States) Carol Young Suh Lee (Czech Republic) Anna Sisková	(Spain) Aliona Bolsova (Spain) Irene Burillo	6–2, 6–3
