= 2026 Open Arena Les Sables d'Olonne – Doubles =

Doubles
- 2026 Open Arena Les Sables d'Olonne

Final
- Champions: (United States) Carol Young Suh Lee (Czech Republic) Anna Sisková
- Runners-up: (Spain) Aliona Bolsova (Spain) Irene Burillo
- Score: 6–2, 6–3

Events
Singles	Doubles
- Open Arena Les Sables d'Olonne

This is the first edition of the tournament.

Carol Young Suh Lee and Anna Sisková won the title, defeating Aliona Bolsova and Irene Burillo 6–2, 6–3 in the final.

== Seeds ==
1. (France) Estelle Cascino / (China) Feng Shuo (semifinals)
2. (United Kingdom) Madeleine Brooks / (Italy) Angelica Moratelli (quarterfinals)

== Draw ==
Key

- Q = Qualifier
- WC = Wild card
- LL = Lucky loser
- Alt = Alternate
- ITF = ITF entry
- PR = Protected ranking
- SR = Special ranking
- SE = Special exempt
- JE = Junior exempt
- JR = Junior Accelerator Programme entrant
- CO = College Accelerator Programme entrant
- NG = Next Gen Accelerator Program entrant
- w/o = Walkover
- r = Retired
- d = Defaulted

=== Draw ===
Quarterfinals
(United States) CYS Lee (Czech Republic) A Sisková	w/o
(Italy) C Rosatello (Latvia) D Semeņistaja
(France) F Ferro (France) H Tan	3	6	[3]
(Spain) A Bolsova (Spain) I Burillo	6	2	[10]
(United Kingdom) A Barnett (France) E Lechemia	6	4	[10]
2	(United Kingdom) M Brooks (Italy) A Moratelli	3	6	[6]

Semifinals
1	(France) E Cascino (China) S Feng	1	2
(United States) CYS Lee (Czech Republic) A Sisková	6	6
(Spain) A Bolsova (Spain) I Burillo	3	6	[10]
(United Kingdom) A Barnett (France) E Lechemia	6	3	[2]

Final
(United States) CYS Lee (Czech Republic) A Sisková	6	6
(Spain) A Bolsova (Spain) I Burillo	2	3
