= Ayana Rengiil =

Palauan tennis player

- Born: 1999 (age 26–27); Koror, Koror, Palau
- Education: Alabama A&M University (BSc)
- Known for: Tennis
- Height: 5 ft 4 in (163 cm)
- Mother: Ernestine Rengiil

Ayana Rengiil is a tennis player, electrical engineer, and notable athlete from Palau.

== Early life ==
Rengiil is from Koror, the largest city in Palau, located in Koror state. Her mother, Ernestine Rengiil, is a Palauan lawyer, attorney general and tennis player. Rengiil attended Palau High School.

== Tennis career ==
Each year between 2013 and 2016, Rengiil competed in the IT&E Northern Marianas Open Junior Tennis Championships. In 2014, she earned a junior ranking at the IT&E Championships and became the first player from Palau to gain a ranking in the International Tennis Federation (ITF). In 2016, she reached the quarter finals of the Singles at the championship, and held the ITF ranking of 713, her highest ranking so far. She also reached the quart finals of the Doubles, alongside her partner Carol Lee, who represented the Northern Mariana Islands.

Rengiil began participating in women's tennis (as opposed to junior tennis) in 2016. She represented Pacific Oceania in the Billie Jean King Cup in 2016.

== Other ventures ==
Rengiil attended university at the Alabama Agriculture and Mechanical University in the United States. She graduated summa cum laude in 2021 with a Bachelor of Science in Electrical Engineering. She received the PNSB Palau Fellowship Award in 2021. Through the award, she completed an internship as a technical assistant at the Koror State Solid Waste Management Recycling Center.

In 2021, Rengiil was a speaker at the opening ceremony of the Belau Games.
