= 2025 MundoTenis Open – Doubles =

Doubles
- 2025 MundoTenis Open

Final
- Champions: (Spain) Irene Burillo (Georgia (country)) Ekaterine Gorgodze
- Runners-up: (France) Carole Monnet (Burundi) Sada Nahimana
- Score: 6–1, 6–4

Details
- Draw: 13
- Seeds: 4

Events
Singles	Doubles
- MundoTenis Open

Irene Burillo and Ekaterine Gorgodze won the title, defeating Carole Monnet and Sada Nahimana in the final, 6–1, 6–4.

Maja Chwalińska and Laura Pigossi were the reigning champions but Chwalińska did not participate this year. Pigossi partnered Ingrid Martins but lost in the semifinals to Burillo and Gorgodze.

== Seeds ==
1. (Brazil) Ingrid Martins / (Brazil) Laura Pigossi (semifinals)
2. (Italy) Nicole Fossa Huergo / (Croatia) Tara Würth (withdrew)
3. (Egypt) Mayar Sherif / (Hungary) Panna Udvardy (withdrew)
4. (Spain) Irene Burillo / (Georgia (country)) Ekaterine Gorgodze (champions)
5. (France) Carole Monnet / (Burundi) Sada Nahimana (final)
6. (Venezuela) Andrea Gámiz / (Netherlands) Eva Vedder (semifinals)

== Draw ==
Key

- Q = Qualifier
- WC = Wild card
- LL = Lucky loser
- Alt = Alternate
- ITF = ITF entry
- PR = Protected ranking
- SR = Special ranking
- SE = Special exempt
- JE = Junior exempt
- JR = Junior Accelerator Programme entrant
- CO = College Accelerator Programme entrant
- NG = Next Gen Accelerator Program entrant
- w/o = Walkover
- r = Retired
- d = Defaulted

=== Draw ===
First round
(Brazil) S da Cruz Mendonça (Brazil) L Fullana	4	6	[8]
(Brazil) C Alves (Argentina) J Riera	6	1	[10]
4	(Spain) I Burillo (Georgia (country)) E Gorgodze	6	6
(Brazil) LG Vidal (Brazil) J Konishi Camargo Silva	1	2
(United States) A Zamarripa (United States) M Zamarripa	4	6	[10]
(Italy) M Tona (Bolivia) N Zeballos	6	3	[8]
(France) A Ramé (Australia) T Smith	6^{9}	1
(Brazil) A Candiotto (Brazil) NV Leme da Silva	7^{11}	6
(Chile) F Labraña (Brazil) R Pereira	2	5
5	(France) C Monnet (Burundi) S Nahimana	6	7

Quarterfinals
1	(Brazil) I Martins (Brazil) L Pigossi	w/o
(Brazil) C Alves (Argentina) J Riera
4	(Spain) I Burillo (Georgia (country)) E Gorgodze	6	7
(United States) A Zamarripa (United States) M Zamarripa	3	5
(Brazil) A Candiotto (Brazil) NV Leme da Silva	3	3
6	(Venezuela) A Gámiz (Netherlands) E Vedder	6	6
(Brazil) M Eduarda Larges; A Zolotareva	1	1
5	(France) C Monnet (Burundi) S Nahimana	6	6

Semifinals
1	(Brazil) I Martins (Brazil) L Pigossi	6^{2}	6	[8]
4	(Spain) I Burillo (Georgia (country)) E Gorgodze	7^{7}	3	[10]
6	(Venezuela) A Gámiz (Netherlands) E Vedder	2	6^{4}
5	(France) C Monnet (Burundi) S Nahimana	6	7^{7}

Final
4	(Spain) I Burillo (Georgia (country)) E Gorgodze	6	6
5	(France) C Monnet (Burundi) S Nahimana	1	4
