= Ernestine Rengiil =

Palauan lawyer and tennis player

Attorney General

Personal details
- Children: Ayana Rengiil

Ernestine Kawai Rengiil is a lawyer from Palau. She is the first woman lawyer in Palau and the first Palauan woman to serve as Attorney General. Rengiil has also represented her country in tennis.

Rengiil was admitted to the bar in Hawaii in 1987, and entered the Palau Bar Association in the same year. From 1992 to 1993, she served as Attorney General, under Ngiratkel Etpison. She served a second term under the administration of President Johnson Toribiong from 2009 to 2013. In February 2017 she was re-appointed to the same position.

Rengiil has represented Palau in tennis at the Micronesian Games and the Pacific Games. In 2002, she won a gold medal at the Micronesian Games. She has also coached the national team for the Pacific Oceania Tennis Junior Championships, including her daughter Ayana Rengiil, who won a gold medal.

== See also ==
- List of first women lawyers and judges in Oceania
