= Anna Sisková =

Czech tennis player (born 2001)

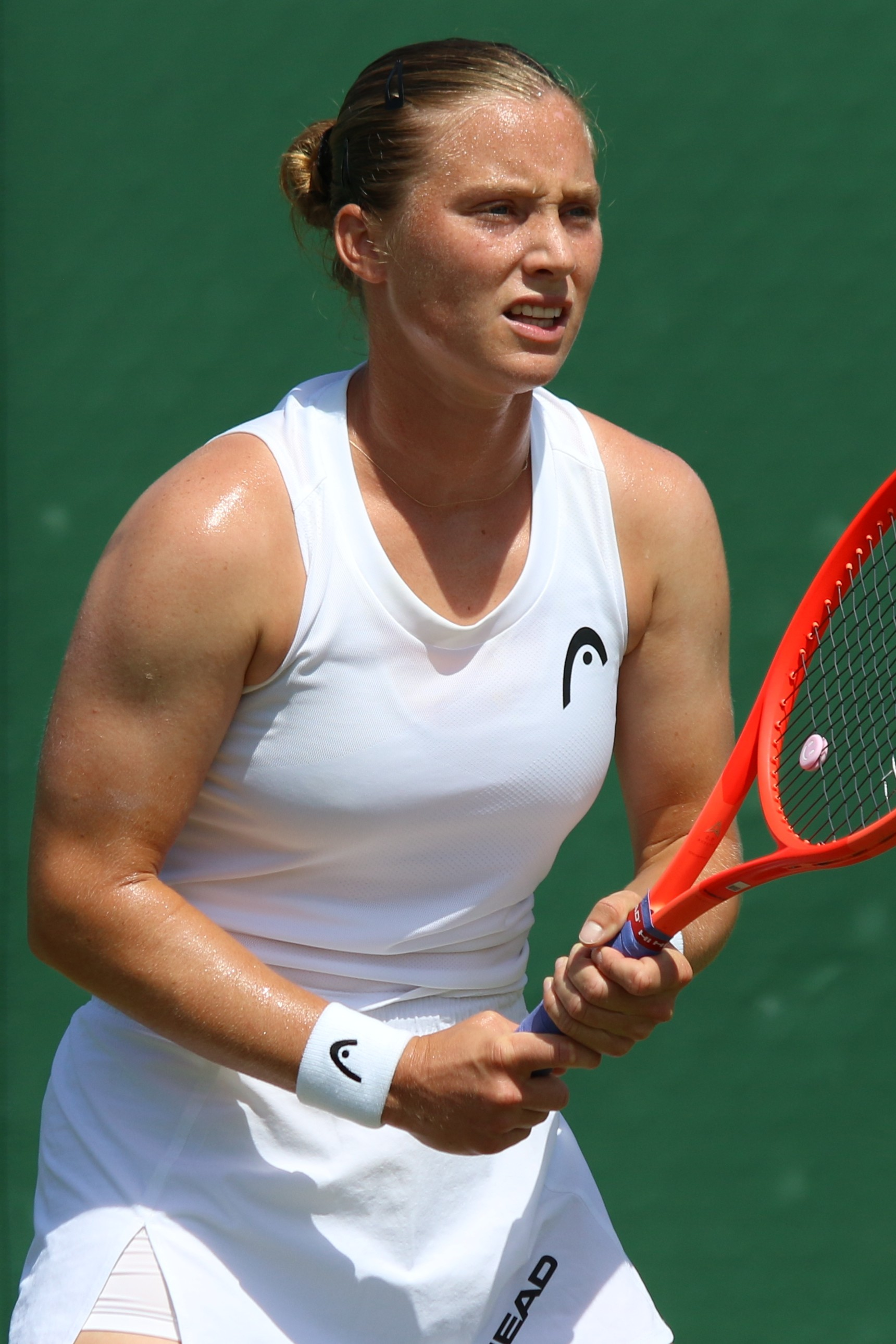
- Sisková at the 2026 Wimbledon Championships
- Country (sports): Czech Republic
- Born: 1 July 2001 (age 25)
- Plays: Right (two-handed backhand)
- Prize money: US$ 692,637

Singles
- Career record: 299–213
- Career titles: 10 ITF
- Highest ranking: No. 153 (16 November 2026)
- Current ranking: No. 153 (16 November 2026)

Grand Slam singles results
- French Open: Q1 (2026)
- Wimbledon: Q1 (2022, 2026)
- US Open: Q2 (2026)

Doubles
- Career record: 287–150
- Career titles: 1 WTA, 4 WTA 125
- Highest ranking: No. 52 (6 October 2025)
- Current ranking: No. 65 (9 November 2026)

Grand Slam doubles results
- Australian Open: 2R (2025)
- French Open: 3R (2025)
- Wimbledon: QF (2026)
- US Open: 2R (2024, 2025)
- Last updated on: 30 September 2026.

Anna Sisková (born 1 July 2001) is a Czech tennis player.

She has career-high WTA rankings of No. 153 in singles and No. 52 in doubles. She has won one WTA Tour doubles title, four doubles titles on the WTA Challenger Tour, as well as ten singles and 32 doubles titles on the ITF Women's Circuit.

== Personal life ==
Her mother Kateřina Sisková also was a professional tennis player.

== Career ==
Sisková won her first W60 title at the 2021 ITS Cup in the doubles event, partnering Jessie Aney.

In January 2023, they became champions in Tallinn, Estonia. In July 2023, she reached her first WTA Tour doubles final at the Budapest Grand Prix, also partnering Aney, losing to Katarzyna Piter and Fanny Stollár. Sisková also won her first tour singles match on her main-draw debut against Evgeniya Rodina.

Having made it through the singles qualifying, she reached the round-of-16 at the 2023 Polish Open, defeating Sinja Kraus before losing to wildcard Maja Chwalińska. In the same month, she won the doubles at the W60 Přerov Cup alongside Sapfo Sakellaridi. In September 2023, Sisková won her first WTA Challenger doubles title at the Bari Open, partnering with Katarzyna Kawa. As a result, she made her top-100 debut in the WTA doubles rankings.

Partnering with Miriam Kolodziejová, Sisková won the doubles title at the WTA 125 2024 Solgironès Open, when Tímea Babos and Dalma Gálfi withdrew from the final.

She made her major debut at the 2024 French Open, partnering again Kolodziejová as an alternate pair, and defeated Ekaterina Alexandrova and Anastasia Pavlyuchenkova, before losing to eventual champions, Kateřina Siniaková and Coco Gauff. She also made the second round at the 2025 Australian Open on her debut, partnering Maia Lumsden, but lost to Erin Routliffe and Gabriela Dabrowski.

She won her first WTA Tour title, partnering Magali Kempen, at the 2025 Transylvania Open.

Partnering Kamilla Rakhimova at the 2025 French Open, Sisková made it to the third round of a major for the first time, including a win over third seeds Hsieh Su-wei and Jelena Ostapenko. Sisková and Rakhimova also made it to the second round in Wimbledon.

Sisková qualified to 2025 Iași Open with wins over former top 100 players Arina Rodionova and Aliona Bolsova. She reached her first tour quarterfinal by defeating Katarzyna Kawa in a third set tiebreak and third seed Ann Li in straight sets. Sisková lost in the last eight to seventh seed and eventual champion, Irina-Camelia Begu.

== Performance timelines ==
Key
W	F	SF	QF	#R	RR	Q#	DNQ	A	NH

(W) winner; (F) finalist; (SF) semifinalist; (QF) quarterfinalist; (#R) rounds 4, 3, 2, 1; (RR) round-robin stage; (Q#) qualification round; (DNQ) did not qualify; (A) absent; (NH) not held; (SR) strike rate (events won / competed); (W–L) win–loss record.
To avoid confusion and double counting, these charts are updated at the conclusion of a tournament or when the player's participation has ended.

Only main-draw results in WTA Tour, Grand Slam tournaments, Billie Jean King Cup, United Cup, Hopman Cup and Olympic Games are included in win–loss records.

=== Singles ===
Current through the 2026 Wuhan Open.

Tournament	2022	2023	2024	2025	2026	SR	W–L	Win%
Grand Slam tournaments
Australian Open	A	A	A	A	A	0 / 0	0–0	–
French Open	A	A	A	A	Q1	0 / 0	0–0	–
Wimbledon	Q1	A	A	A	Q1	0 / 0	0–0	–
US Open	A	A	A	A	Q2	0 / 0	0–0	–
Win–Loss	0–0	0–0	0–0	0–0	0–0	0 / 0	0–0	–
WTA 1000 tournaments
Qatar Open	A	NTI	A	A	A	0 / 0	0–0	–
Dubai Championships	NTI	A	A	A	A	0 / 0	0–0	–
Indian Wells Open	A	A	A	A	A	0 / 0	0–0	–
Miami Open	A	A	A	A	A	0 / 0	0–0	–
Madrid Open	A	A	A	A	A	0 / 0	0–0	–
Italian Open	A	A	A	A	A	0 / 0	0–0	–
Canadian Open	A	A	A	A	A	0 / 0	0–0	–
Cincinnati Open	A	A	A	A	A	0 / 0	0–0	–
China Open	NH	A	A	A	A	0 / 0	0–0	–
Wuhan Open	Not Held		A	A	A	0 / 0	0–0	–
Win–Loss	0–0	0–0	0–0	0–0	0–0	0 / 0	0–0	–
Career statistics
	2022	2023	2024	2025	2026	SR	W–L	Win%
Tournaments	0	1	0	1	1	Career total: 3		
Titles	0	0	0	0	0	Career total: 0		
Finals	0	0	0	0	0	Career total: 0		
Hard Win–Loss	0–0	0–0	0–0	0–0	0–1	0 / 1	0–1	0%
Clay Win–Loss	0–0	1–1	0–0	2–1		0 / 2	3–2	60%
Grass Win–Loss	0–0	0–0	0–0	0–0		0 / 0	0–0	–
Overall Win–Loss	0–0	1–1	0–0	0–0	0–0	0 / 3	3–3	50%
Year-end ranking (Note: 2017: WTA ranking-1081, 2018: WTA ranking-778, 2019: WTA ranking-565, 2020: WTA ranking-556, 2021: WTA ranking-271.)	338	342	623	280		$431,433		

=== Doubles ===
Current through the 2026 China Open.

Tournament	2023	2024	2025	2026	SR	W–L	Win%
Grand Slam tournaments
Australian Open	A	A	2R^{†}	1R	0 / 2	1–1	50%
French Open	A	2R	3R	1R	0 / 3	3–3	50%
Wimbledon	A	2R	2R	QF	0 / 3	5–3	63%
US Open	A	2R	2R	1R	0 / 3	2–3	40%
Win–Loss	0–0	3–3	5–3	3–4	0 / 10	11–10	52%
WTA 1000 tournaments
Qatar Open	NTI	A	A	A	0 / 0	0–0	–
Dubai Championships	A	A	A	A	0 / 0	0–0	–
Indian Wells Open	A	A	A	A	0 / 0	0–0	–
Miami Open	A	A	A	A	0 / 0	0–0	–
Madrid Open	A	A	A	1R	0 / 1	0–1	0%
Italian Open	A	A	A	A	0 / 0	0–0	–
Canadian Open	A	A	A	A	0 / 0	0–0	–
Cincinnati Open	A	A	A	A	0 / 0	0–0	–
China Open	A	A	A	A	0 / 0	0–0	–
Wuhan Open	NH	A	A		0 / 0	0–0	–
Win–Loss	0–0	0–0	0–0	0–1	0 / 1	0–1	0%
Career statistics
	2023	2024	2025	2026	SR	W–L	Win%
Tournaments	4	18	9	4	Career total: 35		
Titles	0	0	1	0	Career total: 1		
Finals	1	0	1	1	Career total: 3		
Hard Win–Loss	1–2	7–11	7–3	5–4	1 / 22	20–20	50%
Clay Win–Loss	3–2	3–4	3–2		0 / 8	9–8	53%
Grass Win–Loss	0–0	2–3	1–2		0 / 5	3–5	38%
Overall Win–Loss	4–4	12–18	11–7	5–4	0 / 35	32–33	49%
Year-end ranking (Note: 2016: WTA ranking-1008, 2017: WTA ranking-1194, 2018: WTA ranking-856, 2019: WTA ranking-774, 2020: WTA ranking-658, 2021: WTA ranking-264, 2022: WTA ranking-170.)	89	79	58				

== WTA Tour finals ==
=== Doubles: 3 (1 title, 2 runner-ups) ===
Legend WTA 250 (1–2)	Finals by surface Hard (1–1) Clay (0–1)

Result	W–L	Date	Tournament	Tier	Surface	Partner	Opponents	Score
Loss	0–1	Jul 2023	Budapest Grand Prix, Hungary	WTA 250	Clay	(United States) Jessie Aney	(Poland) Katarzyna Piter (Hungary) Fanny Stollár	2–6, 6–4, [4–10]
Win	1–1	Feb 2025	Transylvania Open, Romania	WTA 250	Hard (i)	(Belgium) Magali Kempen	(Romania) Jaqueline Cristian (Italy) Angelica Moratelli	6–3, 6–1
Loss	1–2	Jan 2026	Hobart International, Australia	WTA 250	Hard	(Belgium) Magali Kempen	(Poland) Katarzyna Piter (Indonesia) Janice Tjen	2–6, 2–6

== WTA 125 finals ==
=== Doubles: 8 (4 titles, 4 runner-ups) ===
Result	W–L	Date	Tournament	Surface	Partner	Opponents	Score
Loss	0–1	Jun 2023	Makarska International, Croatia	Clay	(Czech Republic) Renata Voráčová	(Estonia) Ingrid Neel (Chinese Taipei) Wu Fang-hsien	3–6, 5–7
Win	1–1	Sep 2023	Bari Open, Italy	Clay	(Poland) Katarzyna Kawa	(Greece) Valentini Grammatikopoulou (France) Elixane Lechemia	6–1, 6–2
Loss	1–2	Sep 2023	Bucharest Ladies Open, Romania	Clay	(Greece) Valentini Grammatikopoulou	(Italy) Angelica Moratelli (Italy) Camilla Rosatello	5–7, 4–6
Win	2–2	Apr 2024	Solgironès Open, Spain	Clay	(Czech Republic) Miriam Kolodziejová	(Hungary) Tímea Babos (Hungary) Dalma Gálfi	w/o
Loss	2–3	Jun 2024	Veneto Open, Italy	Grass	(Czech Republic) Miriam Kolodziejová	(United States) Hailey Baptiste (United States) Alycia Parks	6–7^{(4–7)}, 2–6
Win	3–3	Apr 2025	Solgironès Open, Spain (2)	Clay	(Belgium) Magali Kempen	(Latvia) Darja Semeņistaja (Serbia) Nina Stojanović	7–6^{(7–1)}, 6–1
Win	4–3	Feb 2026	Les Sables d'Olonne Open, France	Hard (i)	(United States) Carol Young Suh Lee	(Spain) Aliona Bolsova (Spain) Irene Burillo	6–3, 6–3
Loss	4–4	Oct 2026	Internazionali di Rovereto, Italy	Hard (i)	(Czech Republic) Dominika Šalková	(Netherlands) Isabelle Haverlag (Poland) Martyna Kubka	1–6, 2–6

== ITF Circuit finals ==
=== Singles: 19 (10 titles, 9 runner-ups) ===
Legend W75 tournaments (1–2) W50 tournaments (1–0) W25 tournaments (1–2) W15 tournaments (7–5)	Finals by surface Hard (7–4) Clay (3–5)

Result	W–L	Date	Tournament	Tier	Surface	Opponent	Score
Loss	0–1	Oct 2019	Telavi Open, Georgia	W15	Clay	(Romania) Oana Georgeta Simion	2–6, 3–6
Loss	0–2	Jan 2020	ITF Cairo, Egypt	W15	Clay	(Netherlands) Cindy Burger	1–6, 5–7
Win	1–2	Feb 2020	ITF Palma Nova, Spain	W15	Clay	(Spain) Alba Rey García	6–3, 6–1
Loss	1–3	Nov 2020	ITF Sharm El Sheikh, Egypt	W15	Hard	(India) Rutuja Bhosale	3–6, 5–7
Win	2–3	Dec 2020	ITF Monastir, Tunisia	W15	Hard	(Belgium) Amelie van Impe	0–6, 6–4, 7–6^{(7–3)}
Loss	2–4	Apr 2021	ITF Sharm El Sheikh, Egypt	W15	Hard	(New Zealand) Paige Hourigan	6–3, 1–6, 2–6
Loss	2–5	Aug 2021	ITF Pärnu, Estonia	W25	Clay	(Estonia) Kaia Kanepi	5–7, 4–6
Loss	2–6	Aug 2021	Vrnjačka Banja Open, Serbia	W25	Clay	(Romania) Cristina Dinu	1–6, 5–7
Win	3–6	Oct 2021	ITF Lima, Peru	W25	Clay	(Bosnia and Herzegovina) Dea Herdželaš	3–6, 7–5, 6–0
Win	4–6	Mar 2024	ITF Sharm El Sheikh, Egypt	W15	Hard	(Slovakia) Katarína Kužmová	6–4, 4–6, 6–2
Win	5–6	Jan 2025	ITF Sharm El Sheikh	W15	Hard	(United States) Carol Young Suh Lee	6–2, 7–5
Win	6–6	Feb 2025	ITF Sharm El Sheikh	W15	Hard	(United States) Carolyn Ansari	6–1, 6–3
Win	7–6	Mar 2025	ITF Sharm El Sheikh	W15	Hard	(Romania) Elena-Teodora Cadar	6–0, 6–3
Loss	7–7	Mar 2025	ITF Sharm El Sheikh	W15	Hard	(Netherlands) Anouck Vrancken Peeters	5–7, 6–3, 2–6
Win	8–7	Mar 2026	ITF Sharm El Sheikh	W15	Hard	Kristina Kroitor	6–1, 7–5
Loss	8–8	May 2026	Empire Slovak Open, Slovakia	W75	Clay	(United States) Claire Liu	7–6^{(0)}, 6–7^{(4)}, 6–7^{(5)}
Win	9–8	Aug 2026	Hamburg Ladies Cup, Germany	W50	Clay	(United States) Rasheeda McAdoo	7–6^{(6)}, 1–6, 6–3
Win	10–8	Sep 2026	ITF Féminin Le Neubourg, France	W75	Hard	(United States) Fiona Crawley	4–6, 6–2, 7–6^{(3)}
Loss	10–9	Nov 2026	ITF Pétange, Luxembourg	W75	Hard (i)	(Ukraine) Veronika Podrez	2–6, 5–7

=== Doubles: 52 (32 titles, 20 runner-ups) ===
Legend W100 tournaments (3–2) W60/75 tournaments (13–6) W40/50 tournaments (2–0) W25 tournaments (7–8) 15K / W15 tournaments (7–4)	Finals by surface Hard (9–10) Clay (23–10)

Result	W–L	Date	Tournament	Tier	Surface	Partner	Opponents	Score
Loss	0–1	Jun 2018	ITF Minsk, Belarus	15k	Clay	(Belarus) Anna Kubareva	(Turkey) İpek Öz (Turkey) Melis Sezer	1–6, 6–0, [8–10]
Win	1–1	Aug 2018	ITF Bucharest, Romania	15k	Clay	(United States) Natalie Suk	(Romania) Cristina Adamescu (Romania) Andreea Ghițescu	7–5, 6–4
Loss	1–2	Mar 2019	ITF Tel Aviv, Israel	W15	Hard	(Netherlands) Merel Hoedt	(Israel) Vlada Katic (Russia) Daria Kruzhkova	3–6, 2–6
Win	2–2	Oct 2019	Telavi Open, Georgia	W15	Clay	(Romania) Oana Georgeta Simion	(Kazakhstan) Yekaterina Dmitrichenko (Russia) Anna Ureke	6–1, 6–0
Loss	2–3	Sep 2020	ITF Melilla, Spain	W15	Clay	(Sweden) Caijsa Hennemann	(Spain) Yvonne Cavallé Reimers (Spain) Ángela Fita Boluda	6–7^{(1–7)}, 4–6
Win	3–3	Dec 2020	ITF Cairo, Egypt	W15	Clay	(Netherlands) Lexie Stevens	(Russia) Elina Avanesyan (Belarus) Anna Kubareva	3–6, 6–4, [10–8]
Win	4–3	Dec 2020	ITF Monastir, Tunisia	W15	Hard	(Poland) Weronika Falkowska	(France) Aubane Droguet (France) Helena Stevic	6–2, 6–2
Win	5–3	Dec 2020	ITF Monastir, Tunisia	W15	Hard	(Algeria) Inès Ibbou	(Switzerland) Fiona Ganz (Serbia) Elena Gemović	6–3, 6–1
Win	6–3	Feb 2021	ITF Sharm El Sheikh, Egypt	W15	Hard	(Czech Republic) Kristýna Lavičková	(Japan) Miharu Imanishi (Lithuania) Justina Mikulskytė	7–6^{(7–0)}, 6–4
Win	7–3	Mar 2021	ITF Sharm El Sheikh	W15	Hard	(Japan) Erika Sema	(Japan) Mana Ayukawa (Japan) Ayano Shimizu	1–6, 6–4, [2–1] ret.
Loss	7–4	Apr 2021	ITF Sharm El Sheikh	W15	Hard	(Canada) Raphaëlle Lacasse	(Romania) Elena-Teodora Cadar (Australia) Olivia Gadecki	3–6, 4–6
Loss	7–5	Jun 2021	ITF Périgueux, France	W25	Clay	(Burundi) Sada Nahimana	(France) Diane Parry (France) Margot Yerolymos	4–6, 2–6
Win	8–5	Jul 2021	ITS Cup Olomouc, Czech Republic	W60	Clay	(United States) Jessie Aney	(Chile) Bárbara Gatica (Brazil) Rebeca Pereira	6–1, 6–0
Win	9–5	Aug 2021	ITF Pärnu, Estonia	W25	Clay	(Lithuania) Justina Mikulskytė	(India) Rutuja Bhosale (Belgium) Magali Kempen	6–7^{(5–7)}, 6–3, [10–5]
Loss	9–6	Sep 2021	ITF Frýdek-Místek, Czech Republic	W25	Clay	(Czech Republic) Miriam Kolodziejová	(Japan) Kanako Morisaki (Japan) Erika Sema	3–6, 1–6
Win	10–6	Nov 2021	ITF Aparecida de Goiania, Brazil	W25	Clay	(Brazil) Laura Pigossi	(Netherlands) Merel Hoedt (Germany) Luisa Meyer auf der Heide	6–2, 7–6^{(7–5)}
Loss	10–7	Feb 2022	Nur-Sultan Challenger, Kazakhstan	W60	Hard (i)	(Russia) Maria Timofeeva	(Czech Republic) Linda Nosková (Russia) Ekaterina Makarova	2–6, 3–6
Loss	10–8	Feb 2022	ITF Nur-Sultan, Kazakhstan	W25	Hard (i)	(Russia) Maria Timofeeva	(Latvia) Kamilla Bartone (Russia) Ekaterina Makarova	6–1, 5–7, [8–10]
Win	11–8	Jun 2022	Pörtschach Trophy, Austria	W60	Clay	(United States) Jessie Aney	(Switzerland) Jenny Dürst (Poland) Weronika Falkowska	6–3, 6–4
Loss	11–9	Jul 2022	ITF Stuttgart-Vaihingen, Germany	W25	Clay	(Poland) Weronika Falkowska	(Spain) Ángela Fita Boluda (Germany) Emily Seibold	4–6, 6–7^{(5–7)}
Win	12–9	Sep 2022	ITF Vienna, Austria	W25	Clay	(Germany) Lena Papadakis	(Slovenia) Živa Falkner (Hungary) Amarissa Tóth	7–6^{(10–8)}, 6–4
Loss	12–10	Sep 2022	ITF Jablonec nad Nisou, Czech Republic	W25	Clay	(Germany) Lena Papadakis	(Ukraine) Valeriya Strakhova (Kazakhstan) Anna Danilina	5–7, 1–6
Win	13–10	Oct 2022	ITF Otočec, Slovenia	W25	Clay	(United States) Jessie Aney	Irina Khromacheva; Iryna Shymanovich	3–0 ret.
Loss	13–11	Oct 2022	ITF Fredericton, Canada	W25	Hard (i)	(Slovakia) Viktória Morvayová	(Australia) Olivia Tjandramulia (Netherlands) Arianne Hartono	5–7, 1–6
Loss	13–12	Nov 2022	Trnava Indoor, Slovakia	W25	Hard (i)	(Slovakia) Katarína Kužmová	(France) Alice Robbe; Ekaterina Makarova	3–6, 5–7
Win	14–12	Jan 2023	GB Pro-Series Loughborough, UK	W25	Hard (i)	(Slovakia) Viktória Morvayová	(Lithuania) Justina Mikulskytė (Netherlands) Bibiane Schoofs	6–3, 6–7^{(3–7)}, [10–6]
Win	15–12	Jan 2023	ITF Tallinn, Estonia	W40	Hard (i)	(United States) Jessie Aney	(United Kingdom) Freya Christie (United Kingdom) Ali Collins	6–4, 6–7^{(3–7)}, [10–7]
Loss	15–13	Feb 2023	GB Pro-Series Glasgow, UK	W25	Hard (i)	(Czech Republic) Dominika Šalková	(United Kingdom) Maia Lumsden (United Kingdom) Ella McDonald	6–3, 1–6, [11–13]
Win	16–13	Apr 2023	Bellinzona Ladies Open, Switzerland	W60	Clay	(Switzerland) Conny Perrin	(United Kingdom) Freya Christie (United Kingdom) Ali Collins	3–6, 7–6^{(11–9)}, [10–5]
Win	17–13	May 2023	Open Saint-Gaudens, France	W60	Clay	(Russia) Sofya Lansere	(Colombia) María Herazo González (United States) Adriana Reami	6–0, 3–6, [10–6]
Loss	17–14	May 2023	Grado Tennis Cup, Italy	W60	Clay	(Russia) Sofya Lansere	(United Kingdom) Emily Appleton (Germany) Julia Lohoff	6–3, 4–6, [9–11]
Loss	17–15	Jun 2023	Open de Biarritz, France	W60	Clay	(Switzerland) Conny Perrin	(Poland) Weronika Falkowska (Poland) Katarzyna Kawa	6–7^{(2–7)}, 5–7
Win	18–15	Jul 2023	ITF Périgueux, France	W25	Clay	(Greece) Sapfo Sakellaridi	(Indonesia) Jessy Rompies (Australia) Olivia Tjandramulia	6–2, 6–1
Win	19–15	Jul 2023	ITF Getxo, Spain	W25	Clay	(Italy) Diletta Cherubini	(Italy) Nicole Fossa Huergo (Bolivia) Noelia Zeballos	6–2, 6–4
Win	20–15	Aug 2023	Zubr Cup, Czech Republic	W60	Clay	(Greece) Sapfo Sakellaridi	(Italy) Angelica Moratelli (Italy) Camilla Rosatello	6–2, 6–3
Win	21–15	Sep 2023	Collonge-Bellerive Open, Switzerland	W60	Clay	(Switzerland) Conny Perrin	(France) Estelle Cascino (Latvia) Diāna Marcinkēviča	7–6^{(7–4)}, 6–1
Win	22–15	Jan 2024	ITF Nonthaburi, Thailand	W50	Hard	(Russia) Ksenia Zaytseva	(Poland) Maja Chwalińska (Japan) Yuki Naito	7–5, 7–6^{(7–3)}
Win	23–15	Apr 2024	Zaragoza Open, Spain	W100	Clay	(Czech Republic) Miriam Kolodziejová	(Italy) Angelica Moratelli (Italy) Camilla Rosatello	6–2, 6–3
Win	24–15	Apr 2025	Open Saint-Gaudens, France	W75	Clay	(Czech Republic) Gabriela Knutson	(France) Émeline Dartron (France) Tiantsoa Rakotomanga Rajaonah	6–2, 6–2
Win	25–15	May 2025	ITF Kuršumlijska Banja, Serbia	W75	Clay	(Turkey) Ayla Aksu	(United Kingdom) Freya Christie (Kazakhstan) Zhibek Kulambayeva	6–4, 6–2
Win	26–15	Jul 2025	ITF Gran Canaria, Spain	W100	Clay	(Belgium) Magali Kempen	(United Kingdom) Madeleine Brooks (Hong Kong) Eudice Chong	6–2, 6–3
Win	27–15	Aug 2025	ITF Koksijde, Belgium	W50	Clay	(Belgium) Magali Kempen	(Italy) Anastasia Abbagnato (Croatia) Mariana Dražić	7–6^{(7–5)}, 5–7, [10–6]
Win	28–15	Sep 2025	ITF Kuršumlijska Banja, Serbia	W75	Clay	(Poland) Weronika Falkowska	(Czech Republic) Michaela Bayerlová (Greece) Martha Matoula	6–0, 7–5
Loss	28–16	Oct 2025	ITF Quinta do Lago, Portugal	W75	Hard	(Russia) Maria Timofeeva	(Portugal) Francisca Jorge (Portugal) Matilde Jorge	6–4, 5–7, [7–10]
Win	29–16	Oct 2025	ITF Poitiers, France	W75	Hard (i)	(Czech Republic) Vendula Valdmannová	(Poland) Anna Hertel (France) Tiphanie Lemaître	6–1, 6–4
Win	30–16	Mar 2026	Trnava Indoor, Slovakia	W75	Hard (i)	(Russia) Anastasia Tikhonova	(Spain) Aliona Bolsova (Spain) Yvonne Cavallé Reimers	6–1, 6–2
Loss	30–17	Mar 2026	Branik Maribor Open, Slovenia	W75	Hard (i)	(France) Jessika Ponchet	(Germany) Anna-Lena Friedsam (Czech Republic) Gabriela Knutson	6–4, 4–6, [6–10]
Win	31–17	Apr 2026	ITF Portorož, Slovenia	W75	Clay	(Slovakia) Viktória Hrunčáková	(United States) Rasheeda McAdoo (Sweden) Lisa Zaar	6–2, 6–4
Loss	31–18	Apr 2026	Wiesbaden Open, Germany	W100	Clay	(Czech Republic) Lucie Havlíčková	(Croatia) Lucija Ćirić Bagarić (Slovenia) Nika Radišić	7–6, 6–7^{(3)}, [5–10]
Loss	31–19	Jul 2026	Ladies Open Amstetten, Austria	W100	Clay	(Spain) Ángela Fita Boluda	(Czech Republic) Aneta Kučmová (Czech Republic) Aneta Laboutková	1–6, 6–1, [14–16]
Win	32–19	Aug 2026	ITF Gran Canaria, Spain	W100	Clay	(Kazakhstan) Zhibek Kulambayeva	(Czech Republic) Dominika Šalková (Sweden) Lisa Zaar	6–3, 7–6^{(3)}
Loss	32–20	Sep 2026	ITF Féminin Le Neubourg, France	W75	Hard	(Poland) Martyna Kubka	(United Kingdom) Naiktha Bains (India) Sahaja Yamalapalli	6–3, 4–6, [9–11]
