= Carol Young Suh Lee =

Northern Mariana Islander tennis player (born 2001)

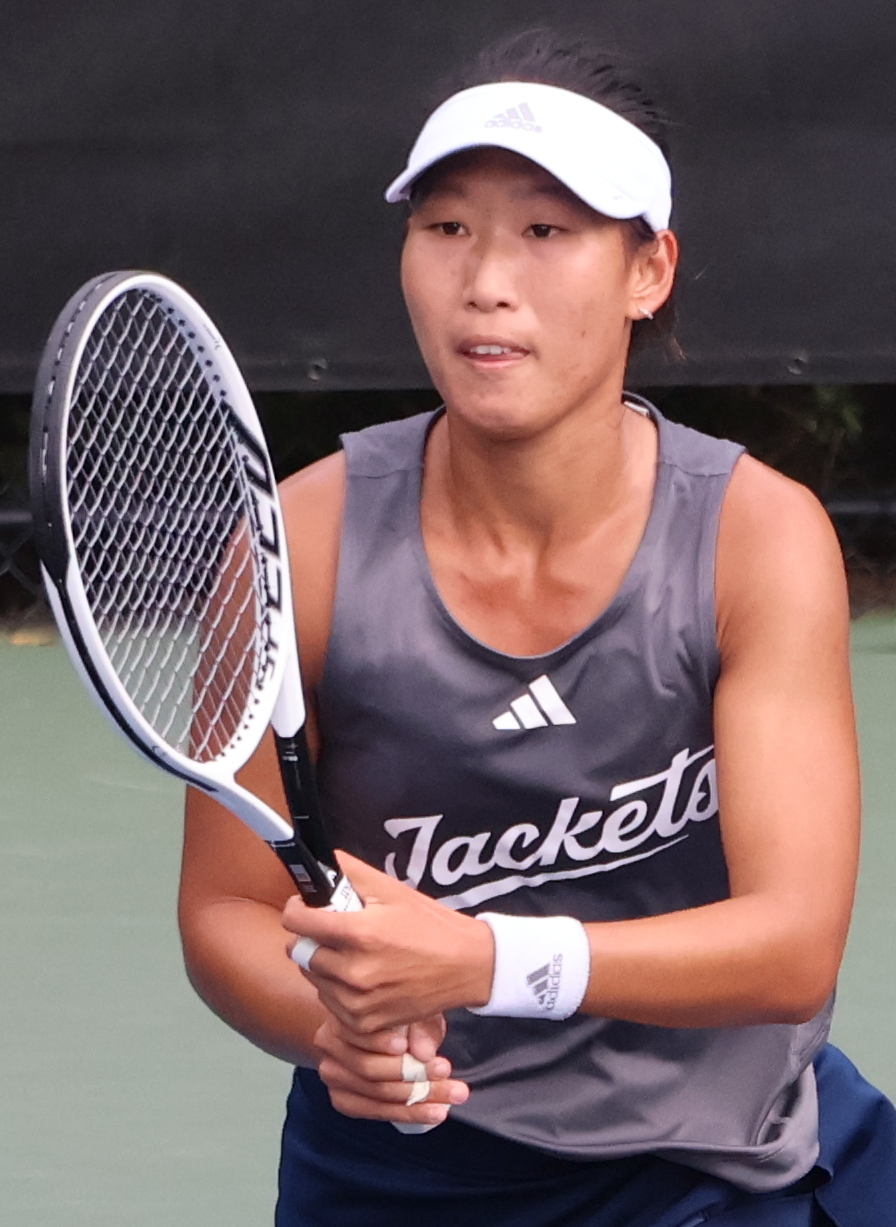
- Lee in 2023
- Country (sports): Northern Mariana Islands; United States; Pacific Oceania (Fed Cup tournaments)
- Born: 21 December 2001 (age 24) Saipan, Northern Mariana Islands
- Prize money: $226,602

Singles
- Career record: 129–50
- Career titles: 1 WTA 125
- Highest ranking: No. 140 (10 August 2026)
- Current ranking: No. 143 (31 August 2026)

Grand Slam singles results
- Australian Open: Q3 (2026)
- French Open: Q1 (2026)
- Wimbledon: Q1 (2026)
- US Open: 1R (2026)

Doubles
- Career record: 30–26
- Career titles: 1 WTA 125
- Highest ranking: No. 228 (20 April 2026)
- Current ranking: No. 281 (31 August 2026)

Team competitions
- Fed Cup: 16–3
- Last updated on: 31 August 2026.

- Lee Young Suh
- Hangul: 이영서
- RR: I Yeongseo
- MR: I Yŏngsŏ

Carol Young Suh Lee (born 21 December 2001) is a Northern Mariana Islander-born American tennis player.

She has career-high rankings by the WTA of 140 in singles, achieved on 10 August 2026, and 228 in doubles, achieved on 20 April 2026. Lee became the first person from the Northern Mariana Islands to compete in a junior Grand Slam tournament, at the 2019 Australian Open.

Lee represents Pacific Oceania at the Billie Jean King Cup, where she has a win/loss record of 16–3.

Lee qualified to make her WTA Tour main-draw debut at the 2026 Prague Open, defeating fellow qualifier Veronika Podrez in the first round, before losing to top seed Marie Bouzková in the second.

She won her first WTA 125 singles title at the 2026 Polish Open, defeating Gabriela Knutson in the final, having overcome top seed Elsa Jacquemot in the first round.

Having won the USTA wildcard challenge, Lee made her major tournament debut at the 2026 US Open, losing in the first round to Katie Boulter in three sets.

== WTA 125 finals ==
=== Singles: 1 (title) ===
Result	W–L	Date	Tournament	Surface	Opponent	Score
Win	1–0	Aug 2026	Polish Open, Poland	Hard	(Czech Republic) Gabriela Knutson	6–4, 7–5

=== Doubles: 1 (title) ===
Result	W–L	Date	Tournament	Surface	Partner	Opponents	Score
Win	1–0	Feb 2026	Open Les Sables d'Olonne, France	Hard (i)	(Czech Republic) Anna Sisková	(Spain) Aliona Bolsova (Spain) Irene Burillo	6–3, 6–3

== ITF Circuit finals ==
=== Singles: 9 (6 titles, 3 runner-ups) ===
Legend W75 tournaments (0–1) W50 tournaments (2–1) W35 tournaments (2–0) W15 tournaments (2–1)	Finals by surface Hard (6–3)

Result	W–L	Date	Tournament	Tier	Surface	Opponent	Score
Loss	0–1	Jan 2025	ITF Sharm El Sheikh, Egypt	W15	Hard	(Czech Republic) Anna Sisková	2–6, 5–7
Win	1–1	Mar 2025	ITF Monastir, Tunisia	W15	Hard	(Netherlands) Isis Louise van den Broek	6–3, 4–6, 6–2
Win	2–1	Apr 2025	ITF Lopota, Georgia	W50	Hard	(Georgia (country)) Ekaterine Gorgodze	6–7^{(7)}, 7–6^{(3)}, 6–4
Win	3–1	May 2025	ITF Toyama, Japan	W15	Hard	(Japan) Hayu Kinoshita	3–6, 6–1, 6–3
Loss	3–2	Aug 2025	ITF Ourense, Spain	W50	Hard	Polina Iatcenko	2–6, 2–6
Win	4–2	Aug 2025	ITF Vigo, Spain	W35	Hard	(Czech Republic) Vendula Valdmannová	6–3, 6–4
Win	5–2	Oct 2025	ITF Kunshan, China	W35	Hard	(China) You Xiaodi	6–4, 7–5
Win	6–2	Jul 2026	ITF Corroios-Seixal, Portugal	W50	Hard	(China) Gao Xinyu	1–6, 6–1, 6–2
Loss	6–3	Nov 2026	River City Challenger, Australia	W75	Hard	(Chinese Taipei) Joanna Garland	7–5, 1–6, 2–6

=== Doubles: 2 (1 title, 1 runner-up) ===
Legend
W35 tournaments (0–1)
W15 tournaments (1–0)

Result	W–L	Date	Tournament	Tier	Surface	Partner	Opponent	Score
Win	1–0	May 2025	ITF Toyama, Japan	W15	Hard	(South Korea) Wi Hwi-won	(Japan) Hayu Kinoshita (Japan) Honoka Kobayashi	7–6^{(5)}, 6–2
Loss	1–1	Aug 2025	ITF Vigo, Spain	W35	Hard	(Australia) Tenika McGiffin	(Netherlands) Joy de Zeeuw (Czech Republic) Vendula Valdmannová	5–7, 2–6

== ITF Junior finals ==
Category G1
Category G2
Category G3
Category G4
Category G5

=== Singles (6–4) ===
Result	No.	Date	Tournament	Surface	Opponent	Score
Loss	1.	18 June 2016	Nouméa, New Caledonia	Hard	(Australia) Lisa Mays	3–6, 4–6
Loss	2.	2 July 2016	Lautoka, Fiji	Hard	(United States) Kaitlin Staines	4–6, 1–6
Win	3.	11 June 2017	Nouméa, New Caledonia	Hard	(France) Helena Mohamed	7–5, 6–2
Win	4.	17 June 2017	Nouméa, New Caledonia	Hard	(France) Helena Mohamed	6–1, 6–2
Loss	5.	25 June 2017	Lautoka, Fiji	Hard	(Papua New Guinea) Violet Apisah	0–6, 4–6
Loss	6.	1 July 2017	Lautoka, Fiji	Hard	(United States) Elle Christensen	2–6, 3–6
Win	7.	27 May 2018	Saipan, Northern Mariana Islands	Hard	(Hong Kong) Lin Wing-ka	6–2, 6–1
Win	8.	1 July 2018	Lautoka, Fiji	Hard	(Japan) Ikumi Yamazaki	6–2, 6–1
Win	9.	7 July 2018	Lautoka, Fiji	Hard	(Japan) Kanami Hayashige	7–5, 6–4
Loss	10.	18 August 2018	Lautok], Fiji	Hard	(Australia) Amber Marshall	1–6, 4–6

=== Doubles (4–5) ===
Result	No.	Date	Tournament	Surface	Partner	Opponents	Score
Loss	1.	18 June 2016	Nouméa, New Caledonia	Hard	(Palau) Ayana Rengiil	(Japan) Otoha Aoki (Japan) Koharu Niimi	5–7, 4–6
Win	2.	20 May 2017	Casablanca, Morocco	Clay	(United States) Skyler Marie	(Gabon) Célestine Avomo Ella (Serbia) Elena Gemović	6–3, 3–6, [11–9]
Win	3.	11 June 2017	Nouméa, New Caledonia	Hard	(New Zealand) Holly Stewart	(Australia) Chiara di Tommaso (Australia) Grace Schumacher	6–4, 6–0
Loss	4.	17 June 2017	Nouméa, New Caledonia	Hard	(New Zealand) Holly Stewart	(Japan) Otoha Aoki (United States) Sara Tsukamoto	3–6, 3–6
Loss	5.	25 June 2017	Lautoka, Fiji	Hard	(Singapore) Maxine Ng	(Papua New Guinea) Patricia Apisah (Papua New Guinea) Violet Apisah	0–6, 6–7^{(3)}
Loss	6.	1 July 2017	Lautoka, Fiji	Hard	(Singapore) Maxine Ng	(Japan) Ikumi Yamazaki (Japan) Hikaru Yoshikawa	3–6, 3–6
Loss	7.	8 October 2017	Perlis, Malaysia	Hard	(Australia) Chiara di Tommaso	(Kazakhstan) Anastasia Astakhova (China) Wang Jiaqi	7–6^{(5)}, 4–6 [7–10]
Win	8.	27 May 2018	Saipan, Northern; Mariana Islands	Hard	(Hong Kong) Lin Wing-ka	(Japan) Nanari Katsumi (Japan) Mua Shigeta	6–1, 6–2
Win	9.	7 July 2018	Lautoka, Fiji	Hard	(Hong Kong) Lin Wing-ka	(Papua New Guinea) Patricia Apisah (Australia) Helena Spiridis	6–4, 6–3
