= Carole Monnet =

French tennis player (born 2001)

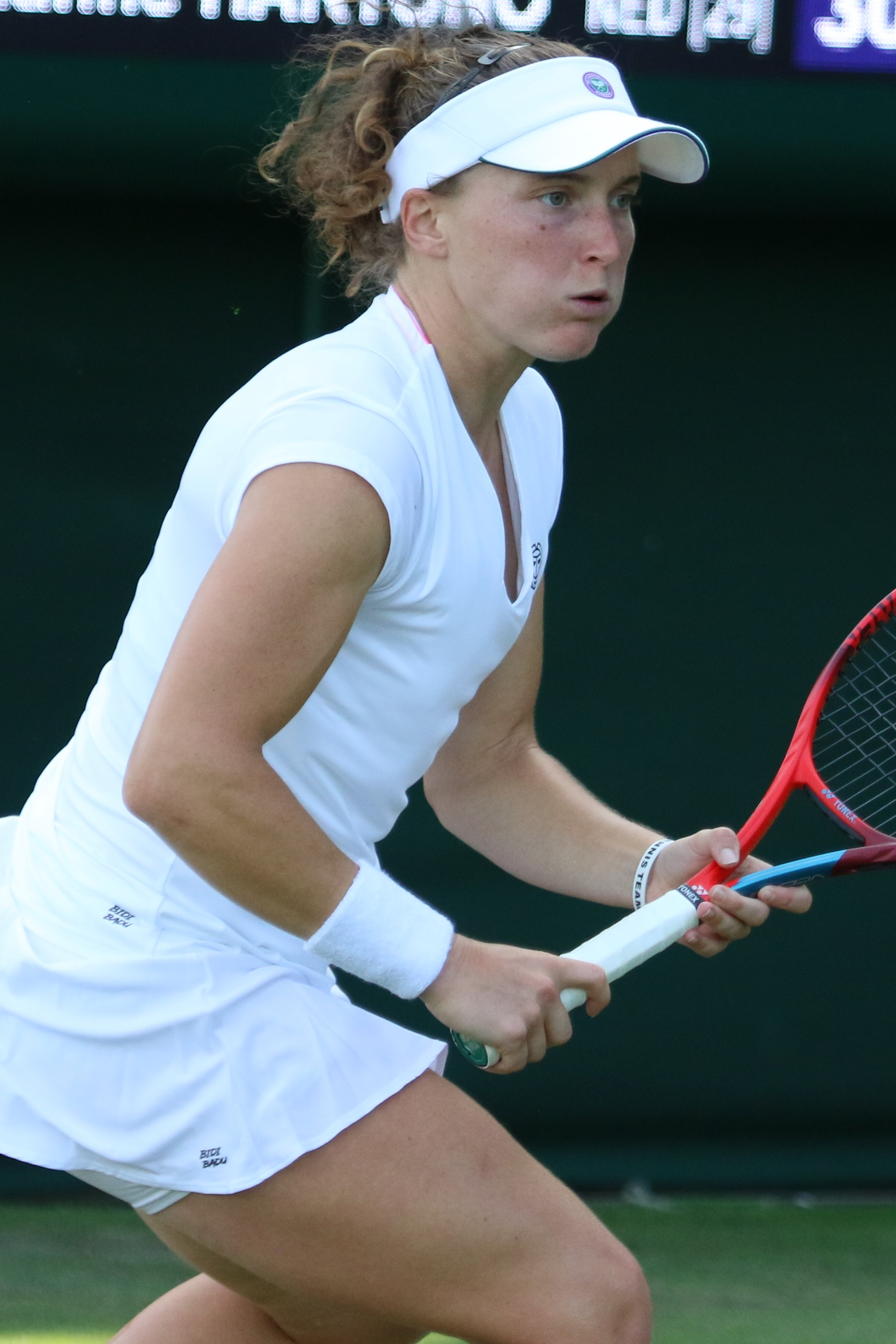
- Monnet at the 2022 Wimbledon Championships
- Country (sports): France
- Born: 1 December 2001 (age 24) Boiarka, Ukraine
- Plays: Right-handed
- Prize money: $792,358

Singles
- Career record: 282–232
- Career titles: 8 ITF
- Highest ranking: No. 158 (24 November 2025)
- Current ranking: No. 196 (25 May 2026)

Grand Slam singles results
- Australian Open: Q3 (2025)
- French Open: 1R (2022, 2025)
- Wimbledon: Q2 (2023)
- US Open: Q1 (2023, 2026)

Doubles
- Career record: 106–120
- Career titles: 1 WTA 125, 3 ITF
- Highest ranking: No. 129 (28 October 2024)
- Current ranking: No. 193 (25 May 2026)

Grand Slam doubles results
- French Open: 1R (2023, 2024, 2025, 2026)
- Last updated on: 2 June 2026.

Carole Monnet (French: [kaʁɔl mɔnɛ]; born 1 December 2001) is a Ukrainian-born French tennis player. Monnet has career-high WTA rankings of No. 158 in singles, achieved on 24 November 2025, and No. 129 in doubles, reached on 28 October 2024.

== Early life ==
Monnet was born in Boiarka, Ukraine, and adopted at the age of two by French parents from Toulouse.

== Career ==
Monnet made her WTA Tour main-draw debut at the 2021 Ladies Open Lausanne, where she received a wildcard entry into the doubles tournament.

Her first singles tour-level main-draw match was at the 2022 Internationaux de Strasbourg, losing to Elise Mertens in the first round.

She received a wildcard entry for the main-draw in singles at the 2022 French Open for her home Grand Slam tournament debut, losing in the first round to Karolína Muchová in straight sets.

Partnering Darja Semeņistaja, Monnet won her first WTA 125 doubles title at the 2024 Țiriac Foundation Trophy, defeating Aliona Bolsova and Katarzyna Kawa in the final.

Monnet qualified for the main-draw at the 2025 French Open after three years absence, defeating Kristina Dmitruk in the last qualifying round. She lost in the first round to Katie Boulter in three sets.

She reached her first WTA 125 singles final at the 2025 MundoTenis Open in Florianópolis, Brazil, losing there to Julia Grabher. At the same tournament she teamed up with Sada Nahimana to make it through to the doubles final, but they lost to Irene Burillo and Ekaterine Gorgodze.

== Grand Slam singles performance timeline ==
Key
W	F	SF	QF	#R	RR	Q#	DNQ	A	NH

(W) winner; (F) finalist; (SF) semifinalist; (QF) quarterfinalist; (#R) rounds 4, 3, 2, 1; (RR) round-robin stage; (Q#) qualification round; (DNQ) did not qualify; (A) absent; (NH) not held; (SR) strike rate (events won / competed); (W–L) win–loss record.
To avoid confusion and double counting, these charts are updated at the conclusion of a tournament or when the player's participation has ended.

Tournament	2020	2021	2022	2023	2024	2025	SR	W–L
Australian Open	A	A	A	Q1	Q2	Q3	0 / 0	0–0
French Open	Q2	Q2	1R	Q1	Q1	1R	0 / 2	0–2
Wimbledon	A	A	Q1	Q2	Q1	A	0 / 0	0–0
US Open	A	A	A	Q1	A	A	0 / 0	0–0
Win–loss	0–0	0–0	0–1	0–0	0–0	0–1	0 / 2	0–2

== WTA 125 finals ==
=== Singles: 1 (runner-up) ===
Result	W–L	Date	Tournament	Surface	Opponent	Score
Loss	0–1	Nov 2025	Florianópolis Open, Brazil	Clay	(Austria) Julia Grabher	6–3, 4–6, 0–6

=== Doubles: 3 (1 title, 2 runner-ups) ===
Result	W–L	Date	Tournament	Surface	Partner	Opponents	Score
Loss	0–1	May 2024	Open de Saint-Malo, France	Clay	(France) Estelle Cascino	(Russia) Amina Anshba (Czech Republic) Anastasia Dețiuc	6–7^{(7–9)}, 6–2, [5–10]
Win	1–1	Sep 2024	Țiriac Foundation Trophy, Romania	Clay	(Latvia) Darja Semeņistaja	(Spain) Aliona Bolsova (Poland) Katarzyna Kawa	1–6, 6–2, [10–7]
Loss	1–2	Oct 2025	Florianópolis Open, Brazil	Clay	(Burundi) Sada Nahimana	(Spain) Irene Burillo (Georgia (country)) Ekaterine Gorgodze	1–6, 4–6

== ITF Circuit finals ==
=== Singles: 16 (8 titles, 8 runner-ups) ===
Legend W100 tournaments (0–1) W50 tournaments (0–1) W25 tournaments (2–2) W15 tournaments (6–4)	Finals by surface Hard (7–6) Clay (1–1) Carpet (0–1)

Result	W–L	Date	Tournament	Tier	Surface	Opponent	Score
Loss	0–1	Oct 2018	ITF Cantanhede, Portugal	W15	Carpet	(Slovenia) Manca Pislak	2–6, 1–6
Loss	0–2	Dec 2018	ITF Antalya, Turkey	W15	Hard	(Romania) Ioana Gașpar	1–6, 2–6
Loss	0–3	Oct 2019	ITF Lousada, Portugal	W15	Hard	(Portugal) Francisca Jorge	6–4, 6–7^{(6)}, 4–6
Win	1–3	Nov 2019	ITF Monastir, Tunisia	W15	Hard	(Romania) Andreea Prisăcariu	6–2, 3–1 ret.
Win	2–3	Nov 2019	ITF Monastir, Tunisia	W15	Hard	(France) Clara Burel	6–2, 6–0
Win	3–3	Dec 2019	ITF Monastir, Tunisia	W15	Hard	(Russia) Mariia Tkacheva	7–5, 6–2
Win	4–3	Feb 2020	ITF Monastir, Tunisia	W15	Hard	(Switzerland) Valentina Ryser	4–6, 6–1, 6–2
Win	5–3	Nov 2020	ITF Monastir, Tunisia	W15	Hard	(Belarus) Yuliya Hatouka	2–6, 6–1, 7–5
Loss	5–4	Dec 2020	ITF Monastir, Tunisia	W15	Hard	(Switzerland) Lulu Sun	0–6, 6–2, 2–6
Win	6–4	Dec 2020	ITF Monastir, Tunisia	W15	Hard	(Belarus) Yuliya Hatouka	5–7, 7–5, 6–3
Loss	6–5	Jan 2022	ITF Monastir, Tunisia	W25	Hard	(Poland) Maja Chwalińska	4–6, 4–6
Loss	6–6	Mar 2022	ITF Antalya, Turkey	W25	Clay	(Croatia) Petra Marčinko	4–6, 1–6
Win	7–6	Oct 2022	Lisboa Belém Open, Portugal	W25	Clay	(Switzerland) Joanne Züger	1–6, 6–3, 6–2
Win	8–6	Feb 2023	ITF Santo Domingo, Dominican Republic	W25	Hard	(Latvia) Darja Semeņistaja	7–5, 3–6, 6–1
Loss	8–7	Jul 2023	Figueira da Foz Open, Portugal	W100	Hard	(Russia) Alina Korneeva	0–6, 0–6
Loss	8–8	Jan 2024	ITF Bengaluru Open, India	W50	Hard	(Latvia) Darja Semeņistaja	1–6, 0–3 ret.

=== Doubles: 12 (3 titles, 9 runner-ups) ===
Legend W100 tournaments (0–2) W60/75 tournaments (0–3) W25 tournaments (0–3) W15 tournaments (2–1)	Finals by surface Hard (2–2) Clay (1–6) Carpet (0–1)

Result	W–L	Date	Tournament	Tier	Surface	Partner	Opponents	Score
Win	1–0	Nov 2019	ITF Monastir, Tunisia	W15	Hard	(Serbia) Tamara Čurović	(France) Manon Arcangioli (France) Alice Robbe	6–3, 6–4
Loss	1–1	Dec 2019	ITF Monastir, Tunisia	W15	Hard	(Russia) Mariia Tkacheva	(France) Yasmine Mansouri (Switzerland) Marie Mettraux	4–6, 6–3, [6–10]
Win	2–1	Nov 2020	ITF Monastir, Tunisia	W15	Hard	(Bulgaria) Dia Evtimova	(Poland) Weronika Falkowska (Belarus) Anna Kubareva	6–3, 2–6, [10–5]
Loss	2–2	Jun 2021	ITF Jonköping, Sweden	W25	Clay	(Sweden) Jacqueline Cabaj Awad	(Italy) Cristiana Ferrando (Romania) Oana Georgeta Simion	5–7, 4–6
Loss	2–3	Oct 2021	ITF Kiryat Motzkin, Israel	W25	Hard	(Russia) Maria Bondarenko	(Netherlands) Quirine Lemoine (Netherlands) Eva Vedder	0–6, 2–6
Loss	2–4	Aug 2022	ITF Mogyoród, Hungary	W25	Clay	(France) Marine Partaud	(Romania) Ilona Georgiana Ghioroaie (Hungary) Amarissa Tóth	5–7, 0–6
Loss	2–5	May 2023	Zagreb Ladies Open, Croatia	W60	Clay	(Croatia) Antonia Ružić	(Slovenia) Dalila Jakupović (Greece) Valentini Grammatikopoulou	2–6, 5–7
Loss	2–6	Nov 2023	ITF Charleston Pro, United States	W100	Clay	(Uzbekistan) Nigina Abduraimova	(United States) Hailey Baptiste (United States) Whitney Osuigwe	4–6, 6–3, [11–13]
Loss	2–7	May 2024	Open Saint-Gaudens, France	W75+H	Clay	(France) Estelle Cascino	(France) Émeline Dartron (France) Tiantsoa Rakotomanga Rajaonah	3–6, 6–1, [10–12]
Loss	2–8	Jun 2024	Open de Biarritz, France	W100	Clay	(France) Estelle Cascino	(Romania) Irina Bara (Romania) Andreea Mitu	3–6, 6–3, [7–10]
Loss	2–9	Nov 2024	Ismaning Open, Germany	W75	Carpet (i)	(Netherlands) Isabelle Haverlag	(Czech Republic) Aneta Kučmová (Czech Republic) Aneta Laboutková	6–4, 4–6, [7–10]
Win	3–9	May 2025	Empire Slovak Open, Slovakia	W75	Clay	(France) Estelle Cascino	(Netherlands) Arianne Hartono (India) Prarthana Thombare	6–2, 6–2
