= Jurerê Internacional =

Seaside resort in Jurerê, Santa Catarina, Brazil

Jurerê International is a seaside resort in the eponymous neighborhood of Jurerê in Florianópolis, Brazil.

== Gallery ==
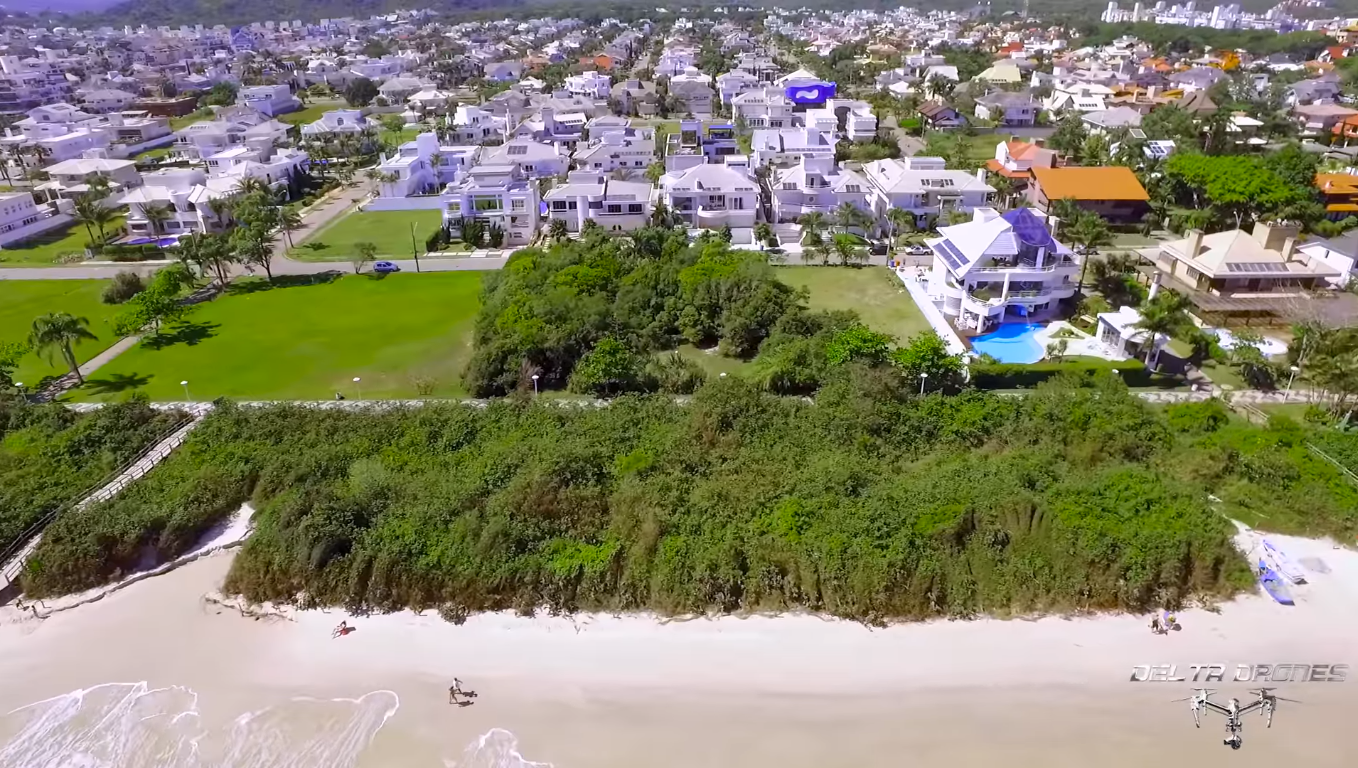
Houses in Jurerê Internacional

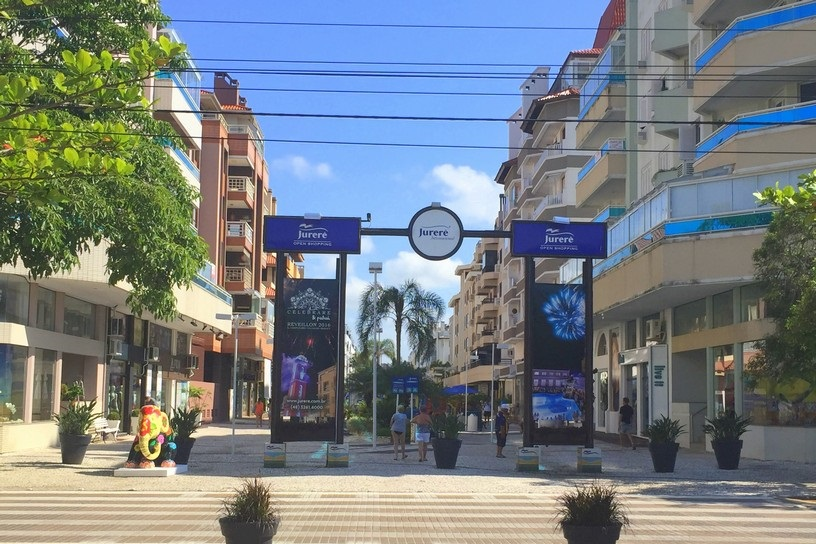
Street Mall in Jurerê

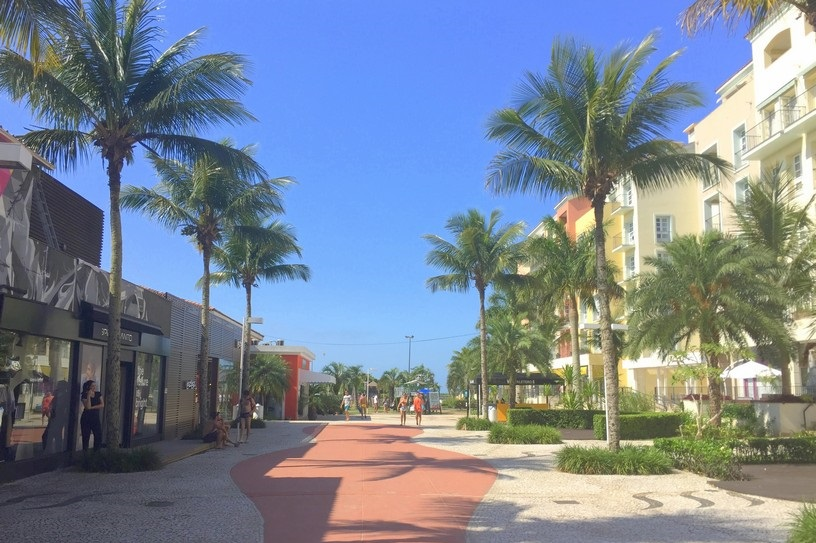
Apartments

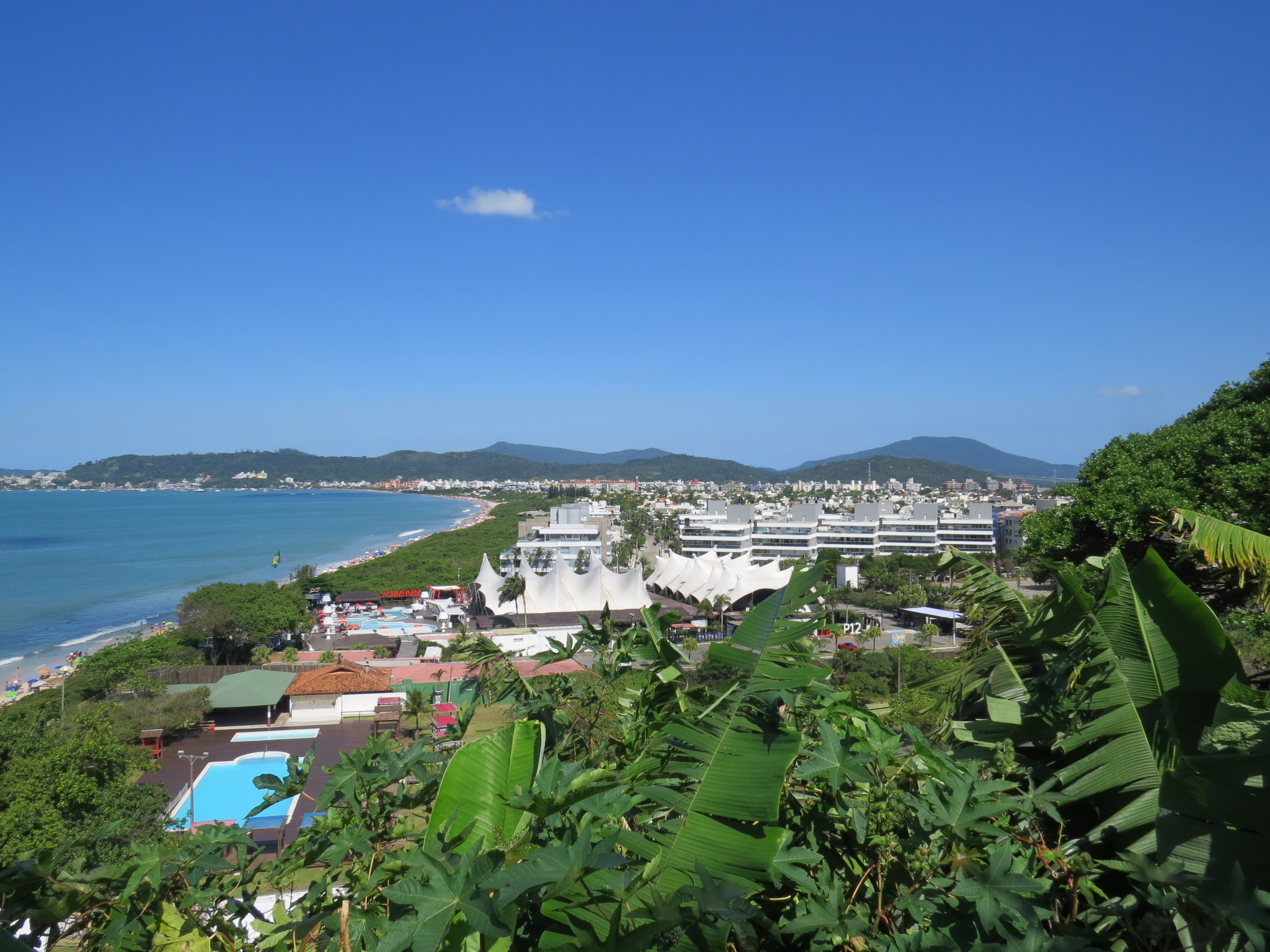
Jurerê beach

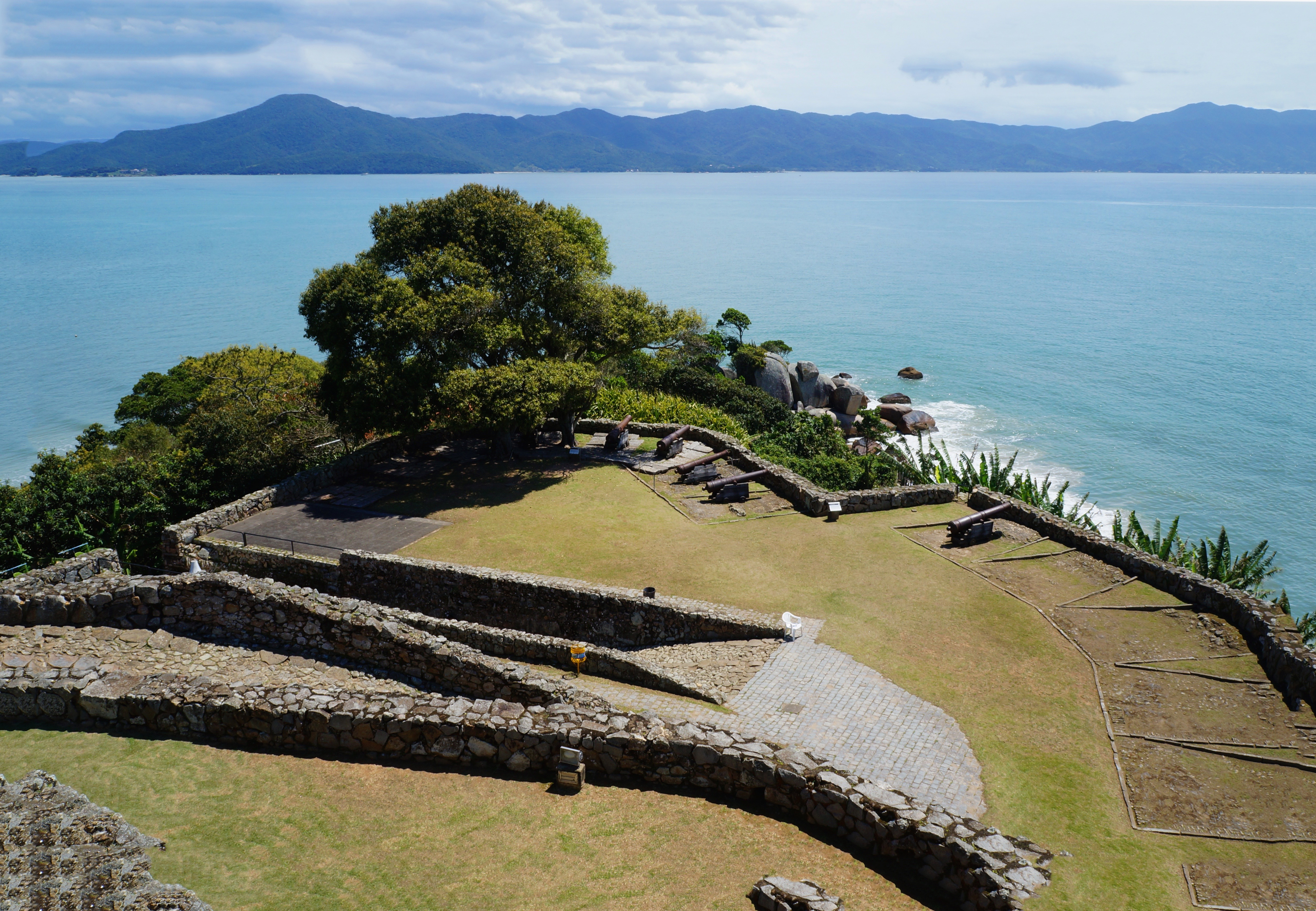
Fort of São José da Ponta Grossa
