= Irene Burillo =

Spanish tennis player (born 1997)

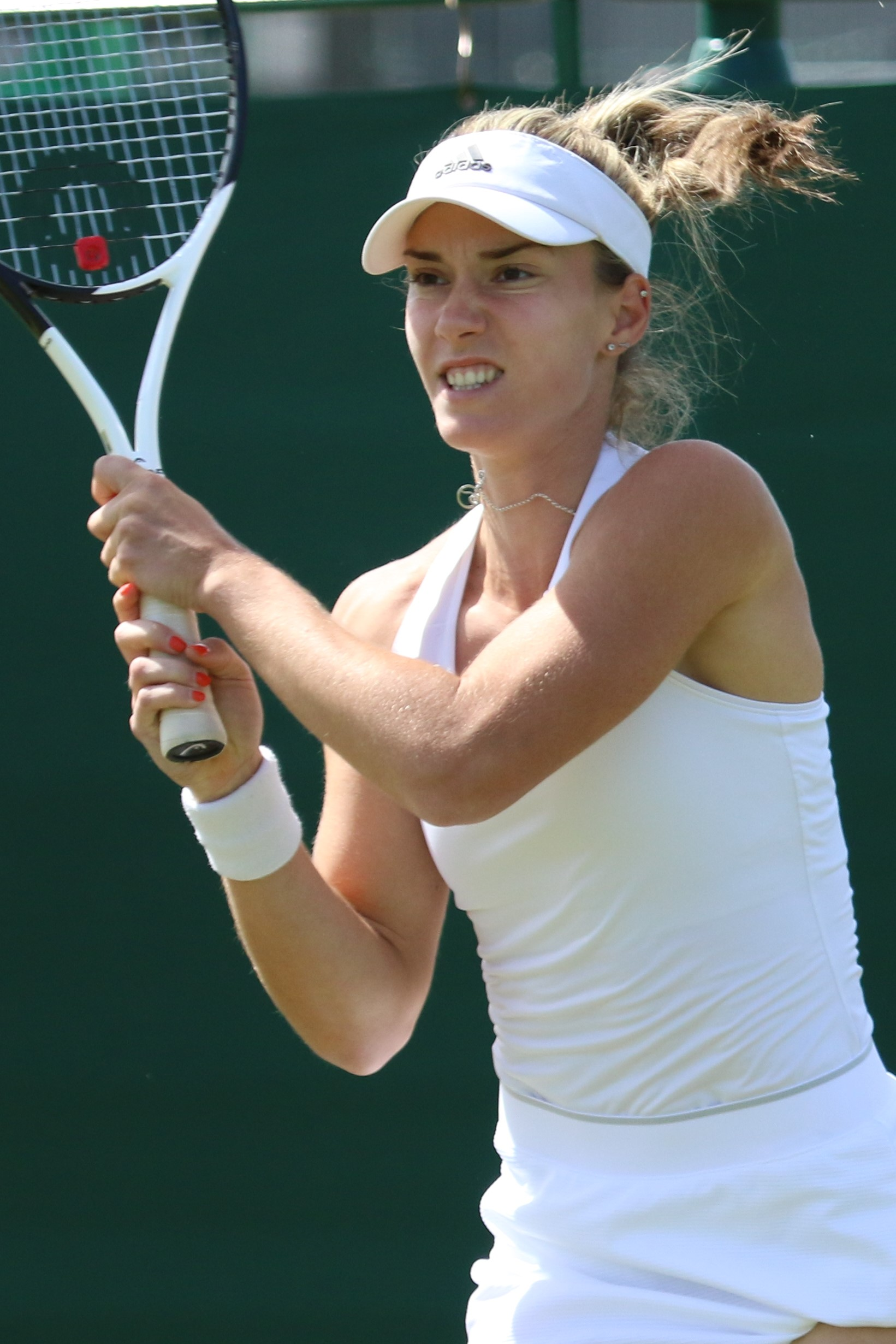
- Burillo at the 2022 Wimbledon Championships
- Country (sports): Spain
- Residence: Barcelona, Spain
- Born: 23 July 1997 (age 29) Caspe, Zaragoza
- Plays: Right (two-handed backhand)
- Prize money: $641,927

Singles
- Career record: 412–341
- Career titles: 8 ITF
- Highest ranking: No. 205 (21 September 2026)
- Current ranking: No. 213 (9 November 2026)

Grand Slam singles results
- Australian Open: Q1 (2022, 2025)
- French Open: 1R (2024)
- Wimbledon: Q2 (2022)
- US Open: Q1 (2021, 2023, 2025)

Doubles
- Career record: 163–147
- Career titles: 2 WTA 125, 8 ITF
- Highest ranking: No. 109 (20 April 2026)
- Current ranking: No. 171 (9 November 2026)
- Last updated on: 13 November 2026.

Irene Burillo Escorihuela (born 23 July 1997) is a Spanish professional tennis player. She has career-high WTA rankings of No. 205 in singles, reached in September 2026, and No. 109 in doubles, achieved on 20 April 2026.

She has won two WTA 125 doubles titles, and eight singles and eight doubles titles on the ITF Circuit.

== Early life ==
Burillo was born in Caspe, Zaragoza. Her father, Carlos Burillo, was a footballer. She has a twin brother named Carlos. She trains at the Ad in Tennis Academy in Barcelona.

== Career overview ==
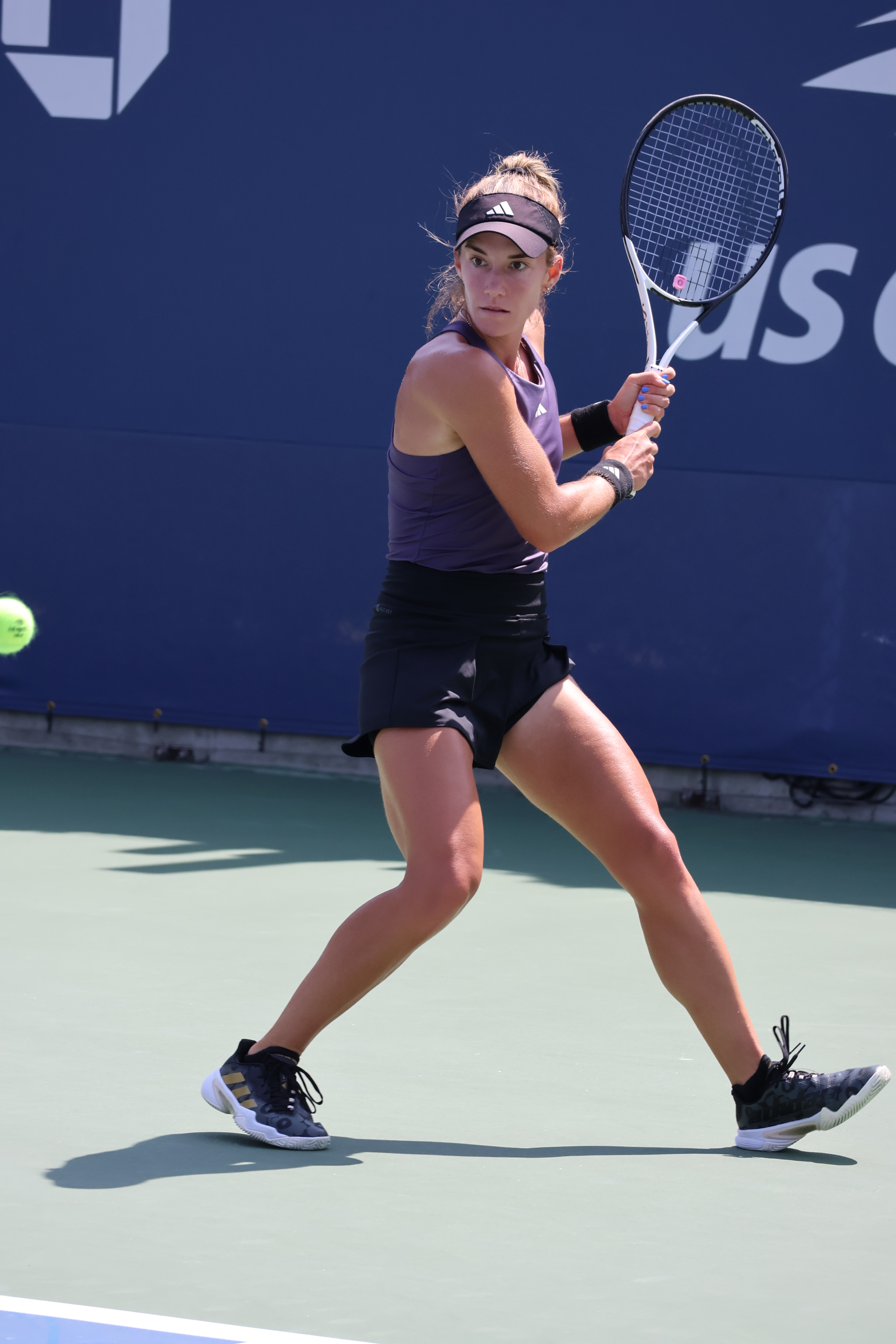
Burillo at the 2023 US Open

In January 2021, Burillo won the inaugural Georgia's Rome Tennis Open, a $60k event, by defeating Grace Min in the final in her fifth three-setter of the week to win her first title since 2017 – and her first above $15k level.

She made her WTA Tour debut at the 2022 Rabat Grand Prix where she lost to Ajla Tomljanović in the first round. The following month, she entered the Open Internacional de Valencia thanks to a wildcard but lost to fourth seed Arantxa Rus in the first round.

In 2023, she qualified for her first WTA 1000 tournament, the Madrid Open, having been given a wildcard for the qualifying. She won her first match at the WTA Tour-level against Kaia Kanepi in the first round.

Ranked No. 280, she qualified for her first major at the 2024 French Open by defeating Carole Monnet, Veronika Erjavec, and Jil Teichmann without dropping a set. However, she lost in the first round of the main draw to fellow qualifier Moyuka Uchijima.

== WTA 125 finals ==
=== Doubles: 7 (2 titles, 5 runner-ups) ===
Result	W–L	Date	Tournament	Surface	Partner	Opponents	Score
Loss	0–1	Jul 2025	Båstad Open, Sweden	Clay	(Turkey) Berfu Cengiz	(Czech Republic) Jesika Malečková (Czech Republic) Miriam Škoch	4–6, 3–6
Loss	0–2	Oct 2025	Rio Ladies Open, Brazil	Clay	(Georgia (country)) Ekaterine Gorgodze	(Spain) Leyre Romero Gormaz (Croatia) Tara Würth	4–6, 1–6
Win	1–2	Oct 2025	Florianópolis Open, Brazil	Clay	(Georgia (country)) Ekaterine Gorgodze	(France) Carole Monnet (Burundi) Sada Nahimana	6–1, 6–4
Loss	1–3	Dec 2025	Quito Open, Ecuador	Clay	Anastasia Zolotareva	(Ukraine) Valeriya Strakhova; Anastasia Tikhonova	4–6, 1–6
Loss	1–4	Feb 2026	Les Sables d'Olonne Open, France	Hard (i)	(Spain) Aliona Bolsova	(United States) Carol Young Suh Lee (Czech Republic) Anna Sisková	2–6, 3–6
Win	2–4	Apr 2026	Open Villa de Madrid, Spain	Clay	Elena Pridankina	(Romania) Irina Bara (Latvia) Darja Semeņistaja	4–6, 6–3, [10–3]
Loss	2–5	Sep 2026	Internacional de Valencia, Spain	Clay	(Argentina) Nicole Fossa Huergo	(Slovenia) Dalila Jakupović (Switzerland) Naïma Karamoko	2–6, 3–6

== Performance timeline ==
Key
W	F	SF	QF	#R	RR	Q#	DNQ	A	NH

(W) winner; (F) finalist; (SF) semifinalist; (QF) quarterfinalist; (#R) rounds 4, 3, 2, 1; (RR) round-robin stage; (Q#) qualification round; (DNQ) did not qualify; (A) absent; (NH) not held; (SR) strike rate (events won / competed); (W–L) win–loss record.
To avoid confusion and double counting, these charts are updated at the conclusion of a tournament or when the player's participation has ended.

=== Singles ===
Current through the 2026 French Open.

Tournament	2021	2022	2023	2024	2025	2026	SR	W–L
Grand Slam tournaments
Australian Open	A	Q1	A	A	Q1	A	0 / 0	0–0
French Open	A	A	A	1R	A	Q1	0 / 1	0–1
Wimbledon	Q1	Q2	A	A	A	A	0 / 0	0–0
US Open	Q1	A	Q1	A	Q1	A	0 / 0	0–0
Win–Loss	0–0	0–0	0–0	0–1	0–0	0–0	0 / 1	0–1
WTA 1000
Madrid Open	A	A	2R	Q1	A	A	0 / 1	1–1
Career statistics
Tournaments	0	0	1				Career total: 1	
Overall win-loss	0–0	0–0	1–1				0 / 2	1–2
Year-end ranking	209	289	267	217	245		$641,927	

== ITF Circuit finals ==
=== Singles: 18 (8 titles, 10 runner-ups) ===
Legend
W60/75 tournaments
W40/50 tournaments
W25/35 tournaments
W10/15 tournaments

Result	W–L	Date	Tournament	Tier	Surface	Opponent	Score
Loss	0–1	Aug 2015	ITF Las Palmas, Spain	W10	Clay	(Belarus) Anastasia Yakimova	1–6, 7–6^{(3)}, 2–6
Win	1–1	Nov 2015	ITF Castellón, Spain	W10	Clay	(Australia) Isabelle Wallace	6–2, 6–2
Loss	1–2	May 2016	ITF La Bisbal, Spain	W10	Clay	(Mexico) Renata Zarazúa	7–6^{(3)}, 1–6, 4–6
Loss	1–3	Feb 2017	ITF Palmanova, Spain	W15	Clay	(Spain) Olga Sáez Larra	4–6, 7–6^{(3)}, 2–6
Win	2–3	Nov 2017	ITF Vinaròs, Spain	W15	Clay	(Romania) Miriam Bulgaru	6–2, 7–5
Loss	2–4	Sep 2019	ITF Arad, Romania	W25	Clay	(Romania) Andreea Mitu	7–6^{(5)}, 4–6, 4–6
Win	3–4	Jan 2021	Georgia's Rome Open, United States	W60	Hard	(United States) Grace Min	1–6, 7–6^{(4)}, 6–1
Loss	3–5	May 2021	ITF Platja d'Aro, Spain	W25	Clay	(Spain) Rebeka Masarova	3–6, 6–3, 2–6
Win	4–5	Sep 2021	ITF Lisbon, Portugal	W25	Clay	(Turkey) İpek Öz	6–4, 6–0
Loss	4–6	Oct 2022	ITF Cherbourg-en-Cotentin, France	W25+H	Hard (i)	(Switzerland) Céline Naef	6–3, 5–7, 2–6
Loss	4–7	Jun 2024	ITF Ystad, Sweden	W50	Clay	(Turkey) Berfu Cengiz	3–6, 6–3, 3–6
Win	5–7	Aug 2024	ITF Erwitte, Germany	W35	Clay	(Czech Republic) Julie Štruplová	6–3, 6–2
Loss	5–8	Oct 2024	ITF Loulé, Portugal	W35	Hard	(Switzerland) Leonie Küng	2–6, 1–6
Loss	5–9	May 2025	ITF Båstad, Sweden	W35	Clay	(Argentina) Jazmín Ortenzi	4–6, 2–6
Win	6–9	Jun 2025	ITF Ystad, Sweden	W35	Clay	Alisa Oktiabreva	6–3, 6–3
Win	7–9	Mar 2026	ITF Heraklion, Greece	W50	Clay	(Italy) Jennifer Ruggeri	7–5, 6–2
Loss	7–10	Jul 2026	ITF Darmstadt, Germany	W50	Hard	(Germany) Nastasja Schunk	7–5, 0–6, 6–7^{(18)}
Win	8–10	Aug 2026	ITF Leipzig, Germany	W75	Clay	(Germany) Ida Wobker	6–7^{(8)}, 6–4, 6–0

=== Doubles: 18 (8 titles, 10 runner-ups) ===
Legend
W100 tournaments
W60 tournaments
W50 tournaments
W25 tournaments
W10/15 tournaments

Result	W–L	Date	Tournament	Tier	Surface	Partner	Opponents	Score
Loss	0–1	Oct 2015	ITF Melilla, Spain	W10	Clay	(Australia) Isabelle Wallace	(Spain) Estrella Cabeza Candela (Ukraine) Oleksandra Korashvili	3–6, 1–6
Win	1–1	May 2016	ITF La Bisbal, Spain	W10	Clay	(Russia) Ksenija Sharifova	(Serbia) Anđela Novčić (Italy) Natasha Piludu	7–5, 6–4
Win	2–1	Mar 2017	ITF Palmanova, Spain	W15	Clay	(Russia) Ksenija Sharifova	(Portugal) Inês Murta (Australia) Isabelle Wallace	7–5, 6–3
Win	3–1	Apr 2017	ITF Hammamet, Tunisia	W15	Clay	(Spain) Yvonne Cavallé Reimers	(Ecuador) Charlotte Römer (Australia) Isabelle Wallace	6–4, 6–3
Loss	3–2	Apr 2017	ITF Santa Margherita di Pula, Italy	W25	Clay	(Spain) Yvonne Cavallé Reimers	(India) Ankita Raina (Netherlands) Eva Wacanno	4–6, 4–6
Loss	3–3	Jul 2017	ITF Turin, Italy	W25	Clay	(Spain) Yvonne Cavallé Reimers	(Spain) Estrella Cabeza Candela (Brazil) Paula Cristina Gonçalves	7–5, 0–6, [8–10]
Win	4–3	Feb 2018	ITF Manacor, Spain	W15	Clay	(Spain) Olga Parres Azcoitia	(Australia) Seone Mendez (Moldova) Alexandra Perper	6–4, 2–6, [10–7]
Loss	4–4	Jun 2018	ITF Hammamet, Tunisia	W15	Clay	(Spain) Claudia Hoste Ferrer	(Argentina) Paula Barañano (Chile) Fernanda Brito	6–7^{(5)}, 4–6
Win	5–4	Jun 2018	ITF Hammamet, Tunisia	W15	Clay	(Spain) Andrea Lázaro García	(Chile) Fernanda Brito (Guatemala) Melissa Morales	6–4, 6–4
Loss	5–5	Jul 2019	ITF Aschaffenburg, Germany	W25	Clay	(Greece) Despina Papamichail	(Italy) Tatiana Pieri (Australia) Ivana Popovic	6–7^{(5)}, 4–6
Loss	5–6	Aug 2019	ITF Vienna, Austria	W25	Clay	(Spain) Andrea Lázaro García	(Germany) Vivian Heisen (Germany) Katharina Hobgarski	6–7^{(4)}, 4–6
Win	6–6	Sep 2019	ITF Marbella, Spain	W25	Clay	(Spain) Andrea Lázaro García	(Netherlands) Arantxa Rus (United Kingdom) Gabriella Taylor	5–7, 6–4, [10–4]
Loss	6–7	Jan 2020	Vero Beach Open, United States	W25	Clay	(Spain) Andrea Lázaro García	(Chinese Taipei) Hsu Chieh-yu (Hungary) Panna Udvardy	5–7, 6–4, [7–10]
Loss	6–8	Oct 2022	Lisboa Belém Open, Portugal	W25	Clay	(Spain) Andrea Lázaro García	(Portugal) Francisca Jorge (Portugal) Matilde Jorge	2–6, 2–6
Win	7–8	Oct 2022	ITF Cherbourg-en-Cotentin, France	W25+H	Hard (i)	(Spain) Andrea Lázaro García	(India) Ankita Raina (Netherlands) Rosalie van der Hoek	6–3, 6–4
Loss	7–9	Oct 2022	GB Pro-Series Glasgow, United Kingdom	W60	Hard (i)	(Spain) Andrea Lázaro García	(United Kingdom) Freya Christie (United Kingdom) Ali Collins	4–6, 1–6
Loss	7–10	Feb 2024	ITF Morelia, Mexico	W50	Hard	(United States) Rasheeda McAdoo	(Russia) Marina Melnikova (Netherlands) Lesley Pattinama Kerkhove	4–6, 6–4, [9–11]
Win	8–10	Jun 2025	Open de Biarritz, France	W100	Clay	(Mexico) María Portillo Ramírez	(United States) Jessie Aney (Lithuania) Justina Mikulskytė	4–6, 6–1, [10–5]
