= 2024 Figueira da Foz International Ladies Open – Singles =

Singles
- 2024 Figueira da Foz International Ladies Open

Final
- Champion: Anastasia Zakharova
- Runner-up: (France) Kristina Mladenovic
- Score: 6–2, 6–1

Events
Singles	Doubles
← 2023 ·	Figueira da Foz International Ladies Open	· 2025 →

Alina Korneeva was the defending champion but chose not to participate.

Anastasia Zakharova won the title, defeating Kristina Mladenovic in the final, 6–2, 6–1.

== Seeds ==
1. (France) Jessika Ponchet (first round)
2. (Canada) Rebecca Marino (quarterfinals)
3. (Czech Republic) Linda Fruhvirtová (quarterfinals)
4. Anastasia Zakharova (champion)
5. (Netherlands) Arianne Hartono (second round)
6. Polina Kudermetova (second round)
7. (Portugal) Francisca Jorge (second round)
8. (Thailand) Lanlana Tararudee (quarterfinals)

== Draw ==
=== Key ===
- Q = Qualifier
- WC = Wild card
- LL = Lucky loser
- Alt = Alternate
- SE = Special exempt
- PR = Protected ranking
- ITF = ITF entry
- JE = Junior exempt
- w/o = Walkover
- r = Retired
- d = Defaulted
- SR = Special ranking

=== Finals ===
Semifinals
(Japan) Aoi Ito	6^{0}	3
4	Anastasia Zakharova	7^{7}	6
(France) Kristina Mladenovic	6	7
(North Macedonia) Lina Gjorcheska	4	5

Final
4	Anastasia Zakharova	6	6
(France) Kristina Mladenovic	2	1

=== Top half ===
First round
1	(France) J Ponchet	2	1
(France) M Rouvroy	6	6
(Japan) A Ito	6	6
(Andorra) V Jiménez Kasintseva	4	4
(France) H Tan	6^{2}	2
Q	E Laskevich	7^{7}	6
WC	(Portugal) A Voloshchuk	2	0
7	(Portugal) F Jorge	6	6
4	A Zakharova	6	6
WC	(Portugal) S Pinto	3	4
(Czech Republic) G Knutson	6	6
Q	(Japan) S Ishii	4	2
WC	(Portugal) M Jorge	6	6
Q	(United Kingdom) A Banks	3	2
(Canada) K Sebov	4	0
8	(Thailand) L Tararudee	6	6

Second round
(France) M Rouvroy	5	4
(Japan) A Ito	7	6
Q	E Laskevich	6	3	6
7	(Portugal) F Jorge	3	6	3
4	A Zakharova	7^{8}	6
(Czech Republic) G Knutson	6^{6}	4
WC	(Portugal) M Jorge	3	3
8	(Thailand) L Tararudee	6	6

Quarterfinals
(Japan) A Ito	7	7
Q	E Laskevich	5	5
4	A Zakharova	6	6
8	(Thailand) L Tararudee	1	2

Semifinals
(Japan) A Ito	6^{0}	3
4	A Zakharova	7^{7}	6

=== Bottom half ===
First round
6	P Kudermetova	6	6
Q	(Australia) G Da Silva-Fick	3	4
(Lithuania) J Mikulskytė	2	6	5
(France) K Mladenovic	6	4	7
(France) A Hesse	6	6
Q	A Gureva	1	3
Q	(Japan) N Sato	5	1
3	(Czech Republic) L Fruhvirtová	7	6
5	(Netherlands) A Hartono	6	6
Q	(Ukraine) K Volodko	4	3
LL	(Peru) A Iamachkine	2	4
(North Macedonia) L Gjorcheska	6	6
(Switzerland) V Ryser	5	6	3
(Australia) M Inglis	7	4	6
Q	(United Kingdom) SB Grey	2	5
2	(Canada) R Marino	6	7

Second round
6	P Kudermetova	6	2	1
(France) K Mladenovic	3	6	6
(France) A Hesse	2	4
3	(Czech Republic) L Fruhvirtová	6	6
5	(Netherlands) A Hartono	6	2	3
(North Macedonia) L Gjorcheska	4	6	6
(Australia) M Inglis	5	2
2	(Canada) R Marino	7	6

Quarterfinals
(France) K Mladenovic	6	5	7^{8}
3	(Czech Republic) L Fruhvirtová	4	7	6^{6}
(North Macedonia) L Gjorcheska	6	6
2	(Canada) R Marino	1	1

Semifinals
(France) K Mladenovic	6	7
(North Macedonia) L Gjorcheska	4	5
