= 2024 Figueira da Foz International Ladies Open =

Tennis tournament

- Date: 22–28 July 2024
- Edition: 8th
- Category: ITF Women's World Tennis Tour
- Prize money: $100,000
- Surface: Hard / Outdoor
- Location: Figueira da Foz, Portugal

Champions

Singles
- Anastasia Zakharova

Doubles
- (Japan) Sayaka Ishii / (Japan) Naho Sato
← 2023 ·	Figueira da Foz International Ladies Open	· 2025 →

The 2024 Figueira da Foz International Ladies Open was a professional tennis tournament played on outdoor hard courts. It was the eighth edition of the tournament, which was part of the 2024 ITF Women's World Tennis Tour. It took place in Figueira da Foz, Portugal, between 22 and 28 July 2024.

== Champions ==
=== Singles ===
- Anastasia Zakharova def. (France) Kristina Mladenovic, 6–2, 6–1

=== Doubles ===
- (Japan) Sayaka Ishii / (Japan) Naho Sato def. (United Kingdom) Madeleine Brooks / (United Kingdom) Sarah Beth Grey, 7–6^{(7–1)}, 7–5

== Singles main draw entrants ==
=== Seeds ===
Country	Player	Rank	Seed
FRA	Jessika Ponchet	131	1
CAN	Rebecca Marino	141	2
CZE	Linda Fruhvirtová	146	3
	Anastasia Zakharova	154	4
NED	Arianne Hartono	160	5
	Polina Kudermetova	174	6
POR	Francisca Jorge	176	7
THA	Lanlana Tararudee	191	8

- Rankings are as of 15 July 2024.

=== Other entrants ===
The following players received wildcards into the singles main draw:

- (Portugal) Matilde Jorge
- (Portugal) Sofia Pinto
- (Portugal) Angelina Voloshchuk

The following players received entry from the qualifying draw:

- (United Kingdom) Amarni Banks
- (Australia) Gabriella Da Silva-Fick
- (United Kingdom) Sarah Beth Grey
- Anastasiia Gureva
- (Japan) Sayaka Ishii
- Evialina Laskevich
- (Japan) Naho Sato
- (Ukraine) Kateryna Volodko

The following player received entry as a lucky loser:

- (Peru) Anastasia Iamachkine
