= 2023 Figueira da Foz International Ladies Open =

Tennis tournament

- Date: 24–30 July 2023
- Edition: 7th
- Category: ITF Women's World Tennis Tour
- Prize money: $100,000
- Surface: Hard / Outdoor
- Location: Figueira da Foz, Portugal

Champions

Singles
- Alina Korneeva

Doubles
- (Hong Kong) Eudice Chong (Netherlands) Arianne Hartono
| ← 2022 · | Figueira da Foz International Ladies Open | · 2024 → |

The 2023 Figueira da Foz International Ladies Open was a professional tennis tournament played on outdoor hard courts. It was the seventh edition of the tournament which was part of the 2023 ITF Women's World Tennis Tour. It took place in Figueira da Foz, Portugal between 24 and 30 July 2023.

== Champions ==
=== Singles ===
- Alina Korneeva def. (France) Carole Monnet, 6–0, 6–0.

=== Doubles ===
- (Hong Kong) Eudice Chong / (Netherlands) Arianne Hartono def. Alina Korneeva / Anastasia Tikhonova, 6–3, 6–2.

== Singles main draw entrants ==
=== Seeds ===
| Country | Player | Rank^{1} | Seed |
|---|---|---|---|
| ROU | Jaqueline Cristian | 123 | 1 |
| GBR | Harriet Dart | 130 | 2 |
| ESP | Marina Bassols Ribera | 134 | 3 |
| CHN | Bai Zhuoxuan | 150 | 4 |
| SUI | Ylena In-Albon | 161 | 5 |
| FRA | Carole Monnet | 185 | 6 |
| CZE | Lucie Havlíčková | 196 | 7 |
| FRA | Kristina Mladenovic | 204 | 8 |

- ^{1} Rankings are as of 17 July 2023.

=== Other entrants ===
The following players received wildcards into the singles main draw:

- (Portugal) Elizabet Hamaliy
- (Portugal) Francisca Jorge
- (Portugal) Matilde Jorge
- (Bulgaria) Isabella Shinikova

The following players received entry from the qualifying draw:

- (Hong Kong) Eudice Chong
- (Malta) Francesca Curmi
- (Switzerland) Chelsea Fontenel
- (Spain) Georgina García Pérez
- Alina Korneeva
- Anna Kubareva
- (Turkey) Pemra Özgen
- (Germany) Sarah-Rebecca Sekulic

The following player received entry as a lucky loser:

- (United Kingdom) Sarah Beth Grey
- Ksenia Zaytseva
