= 2024 Figueira da Foz International Ladies Open – Doubles =

Doubles
- 2024 Figueira da Foz International Ladies Open

Final
- Champions: (Japan) Sayaka Ishii (Japan) Naho Sato
- Runners-up: (United Kingdom) Madeleine Brooks (United Kingdom) Sarah Beth Grey
- Score: 7–6^{(7–1)}, 7–5

Events
Singles	Doubles
← 2023 ·	Figueira da Foz International Ladies Open	· 2025 →

Eudice Chong and Arianne Hartono were the defending champions but Chong chose not to participate. Hartono partnered alongside Prarthana Thombare, but lost in the semifinals to Sayaka Ishii and Naho Sato.

Ishii and Sato won the title, defeating Madeleine Brooks and Sarah Beth Grey in the final, 7–6^{(7–1)}, 7–5.

== Seeds ==
1. (Portugal) Matilde Jorge / (Lithuania) Justina Mikulskytė (quarterfinals)
2. (United Kingdom) Madeleine Brooks / (United Kingdom) Sarah Beth Grey (final)
3. (Netherlands) Arianne Hartono / (India) Prarthana Thombare (semifinals)
4. Evialina Laskevich / (India) Vasanti Shinde (semifinals)

== Draw ==
=== Key ===
- Q = Qualifier
- WC = Wild card
- LL = Lucky loser
- Alt = Alternate
- SE = Special exempt
- PR = Protected ranking
- ITF = ITF entry
- JE = Junior exempt
- w/o = Walkover
- r = Retired
- d = Defaulted
- SR = Special ranking

First round
(Romania) KP Bejenaru (Australia) T McGiffin	2	1
(Japan) S Ishii (Japan) N Sato	6	6
(Czech Republic) G Knutson (United Kingdom) E Webley-Smith	6	6
(Peru) A Iamachkine (Georgia (country)) Z Kardava	2	2
(Portugal) L Couto (Portugal) T Franco Dias	7^{7}	5	[3]
(Germany) M Hodzic (Portugal) S Pinto	6^{3}	7	[10]
A Gureva; P Kudermetova	5	6	[9]
4	E Laskevich (India) V Shinde	7	2	[11]
(Australia) G Da Silva-Fick (Australia) E Micic	6	6
(Denmark) O Helmi (France) A Hesse	2	3

Quarterfinals
1	(Portugal) M Jorge (Lithuania) J Mikulskytė	6	4	[10]
(Japan) S Ishii (Japan) N Sato	1	6	[12]
3	(Netherlands) A Hartono (India) P Thombare	7	6
(Czech Republic) G Knutson (United Kingdom) E Webley-Smith	5	1
(Germany) M Hodzic (Portugal) S Pinto	0	4
4	E Laskevich (India) V Shinde	6	6
(Australia) G Da Silva-Fick (Australia) E Micic	3	5
2	(United Kingdom) M Brooks (United Kingdom) SB Grey	6	7

Semifinals
(Japan) S Ishii (Japan) N Sato	6	1	[10]
3	(Netherlands) A Hartono (India) P Thombare	4	6	[7]
4	E Laskevich (India) V Shinde	3	4
2	(United Kingdom) M Brooks (United Kingdom) SB Grey	6	6

Final
(Japan) S Ishii (Japan) N Sato	7^{7}	7
2	(United Kingdom) M Brooks (United Kingdom) SB Grey	6^{1}	5
