= 2025 Figueira da Foz International Ladies Open =

Tennis tournament

- Date: 21–27 July 2025
- Edition: 9th
- Category: ITF Women's World Tennis Tour
- Prize money: $100,000
- Surface: Hard / Outdoor
- Location: Figueira da Foz, Portugal

Champions

Singles
- Maria Timofeeva

Doubles
- (Czech Republic) Aneta Laboutková / (Lithuania) Justina Mikulskytė
← 2024 ·	Figueira da Foz International Ladies Open	· 2026 →

The 2025 Figueira da Foz International Ladies Open was a professional tennis tournament played on outdoor hard courts. It was the ninth edition of the tournament, which was part of the 2025 ITF Women's World Tennis Tour. It took place in Figueira da Foz, Portugal, between 21 and 27 July 2025.

== Champions ==
=== Singles ===
- Maria Timofeeva def. Alina Korneeva, 6–3, 6–0

=== Doubles ===
- (Czech Republic) Aneta Laboutková / (Lithuania) Justina Mikulskytė def. (Portugal) Francisca Jorge / (Portugal) Matilde Jorge, 6–4, 3–6, [10–6]

== Singles main draw entrants ==
=== Seeds ===
Country	Player	Rank	Seed
SUI	Céline Naef	167	1
	Elena Pridankina	179	2
FRA	Tiantsoa Sarah Rakotomanga Rajaonah	183	3
THA	Lanlana Tararudee	187	4
BEL	Sofia Costoulas	189	5
FRA	Tessah Andrianjafitrimo	194	6
FRA	Carole Monnet	197	7
USA	Hina Inoue	203	8

- Rankings are as of 14 July 2025.

=== Other entrants ===
The following players received wildcards into the singles main draw:

- (Portugal) Teresa Franco Dias
- (Portugal) Ana Filipa Santos
- (Portugal) Amália Suciu
- (Portugal) Angelina Voloshchuk

The following players received entry from the qualifying draw:

- (United States) Emina Bektas
- (China) Guo Hanyu
- Alina Korneeva
- (Chinese Taipei) Liang En-shuo
- (Spain) María Martínez Vaquero
- (China) Shi Han
- Maria Timofeeva
- (Netherlands) Eva Vedder

The following players received entry as a lucky loser:

- (Latvia) Diāna Marcinkēviča
- (Bulgaria) Isabella Shinikova
