= 2023 Figueira da Foz International Ladies Open – Doubles =

Doubles
- 2023 Figueira da Foz International Ladies Open

Final
- Champions: (Hong Kong) Eudice Chong (Netherlands) Arianne Hartono
- Runners-up: Alina Korneeva; Anastasia Tikhonova
- Score: 6–3, 6–2

Events
Singles	Doubles
← 2022 ·	Figueira da Foz International Ladies Open	· 2024 →

Alexandra Bozovic and Francisca Jorge were the defending champions but Bozovic chose not to participate. Jorge played alongside her sister Matilde, but they lost in the quarterfinals against Isabelle Haverlag and Yuriko Miyazaki.

Eudice Chong and Arianne Hartono won the title, defeating Alina Korneeva and Anastasia Tikhonova in the final, 6–3, 6–2.

== Seeds ==
1. (Portugal) Francisca Jorge / (Portugal) Matilde Jorge (quarterfinals)
2. (Hong Kong) Eudice Chong / (Netherlands) Arianne Hartono (champions)
3. (Spain) Georgina García Pérez / (Switzerland) Conny Perrin (first round)
4. (India) Rutuja Bhosale / (United Kingdom) Emily Webley-Smith (semifinals)

== Draw ==
=== Key ===
- Q = Qualifier
- WC = Wild card
- LL = Lucky loser
- Alt = Alternate
- SE = Special exempt
- PR = Protected ranking
- ITF = ITF entry
- JE = Junior exempt
- w/o = Walkover
- r = Retired
- d = Defaulted
- SR = Special ranking

=== Draw ===
First round
1	(Portugal) F Jorge (Portugal) M Jorge	7^{7}	6
(Spain) I Burillo Escorihuela (Malta) F Curmi	6^{0}	4
WC	(Switzerland) C Fontenel (Brazil) G Pereira de Aguiar	1	1
(Netherlands) I Haverlag (United Kingdom) Y Miyazaki	6	6
3	(Spain) G García Pérez (Switzerland) C Perrin	0	5
(United Kingdom) SB Grey (France) C Monnet	6	7
A Korneeva; A Tikhonova	6	7
(United Kingdom) H Dart (South Africa) I Kruger	2	5
(France) E Cascino (Switzerland) Y In-Albon	6	6
(India) V Shinde (Bulgaria) I Shinikova	4	3
WC	(Portugal) S Garakani (Portugal) M Sequeira	1	0
4	(India) R Bhosale (United Kingdom) E Webley-Smith	6	6
WC	(United States) B Brown (Portugal) E Hamaliy	1	1
(Poland) K Kawa (Poland) U Radwańska	6	6
J Kolodynska; A Kubareva	4	5
2	(Hong Kong) E Chong (Netherlands) A Hartono	6	7

Quarterfinals
1	(Portugal) F Jorge (Portugal) M Jorge	3	6	[8]
(Netherlands) I Haverlag (United Kingdom) Y Miyazaki	6	4	[10]
(United Kingdom) SB Grey (France) C Monnet	3	1
A Korneeva; A Tikhonova	6	6
(France) E Cascino (Switzerland) Y In-Albon	2	2
4	(India) R Bhosale (United Kingdom) E Webley-Smith	6	6
(Poland) K Kawa (Poland) U Radwańska	7^{7}	0	[7]
2	(Hong Kong) E Chong (Netherlands) A Hartono	6^{5}	6	[10]

Semifinals
(Netherlands) I Haverlag (United Kingdom) Y Miyazaki	5	2
A Korneeva; A Tikhonova	7	6
4	(India) R Bhosale (United Kingdom) E Webley-Smith	3	1
2	(Hong Kong) E Chong (Netherlands) A Hartono	6	6

Final
A Korneeva; A Tikhonova	3	2
2	(Hong Kong) E Chong (Netherlands) A Hartono	6	6
