= 2023 Figueira da Foz International Ladies Open – Singles =

Singles
- 2023 Figueira da Foz International Ladies Open

Final
- Champion: Alina Korneeva
- Runner-up: (France) Carole Monnet
- Score: 6–0, 6–0

Events
Singles	Doubles
← 2022 ·	Figueira da Foz International Ladies Open	· 2024 →

Jamie Loeb was the defending champion, but chose to compete in Dallas instead.

Alina Korneeva won the title as a qualifier, defeating Carole Monnet in the final, 6–0, 6–0. Korneeva won the title after saving a match point in her first round match against Harriet Dart.

== Seeds ==
1. (Romania) Jaqueline Cristian (first round)
2. (United Kingdom) Harriet Dart (first round)
3. (Spain) Marina Bassols Ribera (second round)
4. (China) Bai Zhuoxuan (quarterfinals)
5. (Switzerland) Ylena In-Albon (quarterfinals)
6. (France) Carole Monnet (final)
7. (Czech Republic) Lucie Havlíčková (first round)
8. (France) Kristina Mladenovic (second round)

== Draw ==
=== Key ===
- Q = Qualifier
- WC = Wild card
- LL = Lucky loser
- Alt = Alternate
- SE = Special exempt
- PR = Protected ranking
- ITF = ITF entry
- JE = Junior exempt
- w/o = Walkover
- r = Retired
- d = Defaulted
- SR = Special ranking

=== Finals ===
Semifinals
6	(France) Carole Monnet	6	6
WC	(Portugal) Francisca Jorge	4	4
(France) Harmony Tan	4	2
Q	Alina Korneeva	6	6

Final
6	(France) Carole Monnet	0	0
Q	Alina Korneeva	6	6

=== Top half ===
First round
1	(Romania) J Cristian	2	7^{7}	6^{7}
WC	(Portugal) M Jorge	6	6^{2}	7^{9}
(Poland) K Kawa	6^{5}	1
LL	(United Kingdom) SB Grey	7^{7}	6
WC	(Portugal) E Hamaliy	5	7	3
Q	(Switzerland) C Fontenel	7	5	6
Q	(Turkey) P Özgen	2	3
6	(France) C Monnet	6	6
3	(Spain) M Bassols Ribera	6	7
Q	(Hong Kong) E Chong	2	5
WC	(Bulgaria) I Shinikova	3	3
(United Kingdom) Y Miyazaki	6	6
Q	(Spain) G García Pérez	2	1
WC	(Portugal) F Jorge	6	6
Q	(Germany) S-R Sekulic	3	7	3
8	(France) K Mladenovic	6	5	6

Second round
WC	(Portugal) M Jorge	6	4	1
LL	(United Kingdom) SB Grey	2	6	6
Q	(Switzerland) C Fontenel	5	2
6	(France) C Monnet	7	6
3	(Spain) M Bassols Ribera	6	4	5
(United Kingdom) Y Miyazaki	4	6	7
WC	(Portugal) F Jorge	6	6
8	(France) K Mladenovic	2	2

Quarterfinals
LL	(United Kingdom) SB Grey	2	1
6	(France) C Monnet	6	6
(United Kingdom) Y Miyazaki	2	3
WC	(Portugal) F Jorge	6	6

Semifinals
6	(France) C Monnet	6	6
WC	(Portugal) F Jorge	4	4

=== Bottom half ===
First round
7	(Czech Republic) L Havlíčková	3	6	0
Q	(Malta) F Curmi	6	2	6
Q	A Kubareva	2	1
(France) H Tan	6	6
LL	K Zaytseva	0	4
(Spain) I Burillo Escorihuela	6	6
(Netherlands) L Pattinama Kerkhove	5	1
4	(China) Z Bai	7	6
5	(Switzerland) Y In-Albon	7	6
(Japan) S Hosogi	5	2
(Netherlands) A Hartono	3	5
(Australia) Ar Rodionova	6	7
(Japan) H Kaji	6	0	6
A Tikhonova	2	6	4
Q	A Korneeva	7	5	7^{7}
2	(United Kingdom) H Dart	5	7	6^{4}

Second round
Q	(Malta) F Curmi	3	5
(France) H Tan	6	7
(Spain) I Burillo Escorihuela	1	1
4	(China) Z Bai	6	6
5	(Switzerland) Y In-Albon	2	6	7
(Australia) Ar Rodionova	6	3	5
(Japan) H Kaji	1	1
Q	A Korneeva	6	6

Quarterfinals
(France) H Tan	6	6
4	(China) Z Bai	3	3
5	(Switzerland) Y In-Albon	3	4
Q	A Korneeva	6	6

Semifinals
(France) H Tan	4	2
Q	A Korneeva	6	6
