= 2026 Oeiras Indoors 1 =

- Date: 9–15 February
- Edition: 1st
- Category: WTA 125
- Draw: 32S/16D
- Prize money: €100,000
- Surface: Hard (Indoor)
- Location: Oeiras, Portugal

Champions

Singles
- Alina Korneeva

Doubles
- (United States) Carmen Corley / (United States) Ivana Corley
- Oeiras Indoors

The 2026 Oeiras 1 Jamor Indoor was a professional women's tennis tournament played on indoor hardcourts. It was the first edition of the tournament in a series of two WTA 125 tournaments played at the same venue in consecutive weeks in 2026. It took place at the Centro Desportivo Nacional do Jamor in Oeiras, Portugal between 9 and 15 February 2026.

== Singles main-draw entrants ==
=== Seeds ===
Country	Player	Rank^{1}	Seed
SUI	Viktorija Golubic	89	1
HUN	Dalma Gálfi	90	2
NED	Suzan Lamens	105	3
AND	Victoria Jiménez Kasintseva	112	4
FRA	Tiantsoa Rakotomanga Rajaonah	116	5
~~FRA~~	~~Diane Parry~~	~~119~~	~~6~~
BEL	Greet Minnen	125	7
POL	Linda Klimovičová	131	8
ESP	Kaitlin Quevedo	134	9

- ^{1} Rankings as of 2 February 2026.

=== Other entrants ===
The following players received wildcards into the singles main draw:

- (Portugal) Gabriela Agra Amorim
- (Portugal) Matilde Jorge
- Alina Korneeva
- (Portugal) Angelina Voloshchuk

The following players received entry from the qualifying draw:

- (Slovenia) Dalila Jakupović
- (United States) Varvara Lepchenko
- (Germany) Noma Noha Akugue
- (Spain) Nuria Párrizas Díaz

the following player received entry as a lucky loser:

- (Chinese Taipei) Liang En-shuo

=== Withdrawals ===
Before the tournament

- (Czech Republic) Nikola Bartůňková → replaced by (Czech Republic) Dominika Šalková
- (United Kingdom) Katie Boulter → replaced by (Portugal) Francisca Jorge
- (United States) Caroline Dolehide → replaced by (United States) Fiona Crawley
- (France) Diane Parry → replaced by (Chinese Taipei) Liang En-shuo (LL)
- (Egypt) Mayar Sherif → replaced by (Poland) Maja Chwalińska
- (Ukraine) Daria Snigur → replaced by Iryna Shymanovich
- (Canada) Marina Stakusic → replaced by (France) Carole Monnet
- (Uzbekistan) Maria Timofeeva → replaced by (Armenia) Elina Avanesyan
- (United States) Taylor Townsend → replaced by (Czech Republic) Darja Viďmanová
- (China) Yuan Yue → replaced by (Germany) Anna-Lena Friedsam

== Doubles main-draw entrants ==
=== Seeds ===
Country	Player	Country	Player	Rank^{1}	Seed
GBR	Emily Appleton	JPN	Makoto Ninomiya	147	1
GBR	Maia Lumsden	CHN	Tang Qianhui	154	2
HKG	Eudice Chong	TPE	Liang En-shuo	163	3
ESP	Yvonne Cavallé Reimers	ITA	Angelica Moratelli	190	4

- ^{1} Rankings as of 2 February 2026.

=== Other entrants ===
The following team received a wildcard into the doubles main draw:

- (Portugal) Teresa Franco Dias / (Portugal) Sara Lança

=== Withdrawal ===
During the tournament

- (Portugal) Francisca Jorge / (Portugal) Matilde Jorge (M. Jorge – left leg injury)

== Champions ==
=== Singles ===
- Alina Korneeva def. (Czech Republic) Darja Viďmanová 7–5, 6–1

=== Doubles ===
- (United States) Carmen Corley / (United States) Ivana Corley def. (United Kingdom) Emily Appleton / (Japan) Makoto Ninomiya 2–6, 6–0, [10–4]
