= 2026 Figueira da Foz International Ladies Open – Singles =

Singles
- 2026 Figueira da Foz International Ladies Open

Final
- Champion: (Czech Republic) Darja Vidmanova
- Runner-up: (Turkey) Ayla Aksu
- Score: 6–2, 6–3

Events
Singles	Doubles
- Figueira da Foz International Ladies Open

Maria Timofeeva was the defending champion, but chose to compete in Berlin qualifying instead.

Darja Vidmanova won the title, defeating Ayla Aksu 6–2, 6–3 in the final.

== Seeds ==
1. Alina Korneeva (second round)
2. (Brazil) Beatriz Haddad Maia (first round)
3. (Czech Republic) Darja Vidmanova (champion)
4. Alina Charaeva (semifinals)
5. (Switzerland) Jil Teichmann (quarterfinals)
6. (Italy) Lucrezia Stefanini (first round)
7. (Switzerland) Susan Bandecchi (quarterfinals)
8. (Belgium) Jeline Vandromme (quarterfinals)

== Draw ==
Key

- Q = Qualifier
- WC = Wild card
- LL = Lucky loser
- Alt = Alternate
- ITF = ITF entry
- PR = Protected ranking
- SR = Special ranking
- SE = Special exempt
- JE = Junior exempt
- JR = Junior Accelerator Programme entrant
- CO = College Accelerator Programme entrant
- NG = Next Gen Accelerator Program entrant
- w/o = Walkover
- r = Retired
- d = Defaulted

=== Finals ===
Semifinals
(South Korea) Ku Yeon-woo	4	3
3	(Czech Republic) Darja Vidmanova	6	6
4/WC	Alina Charaeva	3	7^{7}	6^{4}
(Turkey) Ayla Aksu	6	6^{5}	7^{7}

Final
3	(Czech Republic) Darja Vidmanova	6	6
(Turkey) Ayla Aksu	2	3

=== Top half ===
First round
1/WC	A Korneeva	6	6
(China) F Tian	2	4
(Poland) M Kubka	6	4
A Falei	3	0^{r}
(Japan) H Kinoshita	1	1
(Slovakia) V Hrunčáková	6	6
(South Korea) Y-w Ku	6	7
6	(Italy) L Stefanini	4	5
3	(Czech Republic) D Vidmanova	6	1	6
Q	(Portugal) A Voloshchuk	4	6	4
(Australia) E Micic	6	7^{7}
(Portugal) F Jorge	4	6^{3}
(United States) C Ansari	4	2
(Czech Republic) B Palicová	6	6
(Portugal) M Jorge	5	1
5	(Switzerland) J Teichmann	7	6

Second round
1/WC	A Korneeva	6^{4}	7	4
(Poland) M Kubka	7^{7}	5	6
(Slovakia) V Hrunčáková	4	3
(South Korea) Y-w Ku	6	6
3	(Czech Republic) D Vidmanova	6	6
(Australia) E Micic	3	4
(Czech Republic) B Palicová	4	6	3
5	(Switzerland) J Teichmann	6	4	6

Quarterfinals
(Poland) M Kubka	6	4	1
(South Korea) Y-w Ku	3	6	6
3	(Czech Republic) D Vidmanova	4	6	6
5	(Switzerland) J Teichmann	6	3	2

Semifinals
(South Korea) Y-w Ku	4	3
3	(Czech Republic) D Vidmanova	6	6

=== Bottom half ===
First round
7	(Switzerland) S Bandecchi	2	6	6
V Zvonareva	6	4	2
(Slovakia) K Kužmová	6	6
(Slovakia) V Morvayová	3	2
Q	(Finland) A Kulikova	4	6	6
(Japan) M Hontama	6	3	4
(France) M Léonard	0	0
4/WC	A Charaeva	6	6
8	(Belgium) J Vandromme	3	7^{7}	7
Q	(United States) A Zamarripa	6	6^{3}	5
WC	(France) K Mladenovic	1	3
Q	(Switzerland) V Ryser	6	6
(Turkey) A Aksu	6	6
(Mexico) AS Sánchez	2	2
PR	(United States) S Vickery	7	7
2/WC	(Brazil) B Haddad Maia	5	5

Second round
7	(Switzerland) S Bandecchi	4	7	6
(Slovakia) K Kužmová	6	5	2
Q	(Finland) A Kulikova	2	2
4/WC	A Charaeva	6	6
8	(Belgium) J Vandromme	6	7^{7}
Q	(Switzerland) V Ryser	1	6^{4}
(Turkey) A Aksu	w/o
PR	(United States) S Vickery

Quarterfinals
7	(Switzerland) S Bandecchi	7	2	5
4/WC	A Charaeva	5	6	7
8	(Belgium) J Vandromme	5	6	4
(Turkey) A Aksu	7	1	6

Semifinals
4/WC	A Charaeva	3	7^{7}	6^{4}
(Turkey) A Aksu	6	6^{5}	7^{7}

== Qualifying ==
=== Seeds ===
1. (United States) Whitney Osuigwe (qualifying competition)
2. (Canada) Katherine Sebov (first round)
3. (Switzerland) Valentina Ryser (qualified)
4. (France) Manon Léonard (moved to main draw)
5. (Japan) Momoko Kobori (qualifying competition)
6. (Australia) Elena Micic (moved to main draw)
7. (Portugal) Angelina Voloshchuk (qualified)
8. (United States) Alana Smith (qualifying competition)

=== Qualifiers ===
1. (Portugal) Angelina Voloshchuk
2. (United States) Allura Zamarripa
3. (Switzerland) Valentina Ryser
4. (Finland) Anastasia Kulikova

=== Qualifying draw ===
==== First qualifier ====
First round
1	(United States) Whitney Osuigwe	6	6
WC	(Portugal) Carla Tomai	0	0
(Italy) Valentina Losciale	1	4
7	(Portugal) Angelina Voloshchuk	6	6

Qualifying competition
1	(United States) Whitney Osuigwe	1	4
7	(Portugal) Angelina Voloshchuk	6	6

==== Second qualifier ====
First round
2	(Canada) Katherine Sebov	3	3
(United States) Allura Zamarripa	6	6
(Spain) Maria Martinez Vaquero	6	3	6
Alt	(China) Feng Shuo	4	6	4

Qualifying competition
(United States) Allura Zamarripa	6	6
(Spain) Maria Martinez Vaquero	4	4

==== Third qualifier ====
First round
3	(Switzerland) Valentina Ryser	6	6
WC	(Portugal) Sana Garakani	1	1
(China) Liu Min	2	4
8	(United States) Alana Smith	6	6

Qualifying competition
3	(Switzerland) Valentina Ryser	7	0	7^{7}
8	(United States) Alana Smith	5	6	6^{3}

==== Fourth qualifier ====
First round
Alt	(Ukraine) Polina Isakova	3	0
(Finland) Anastasia Kulikova	6	6
(Spain) Carmen Lopez Martinez	1	0
5	(Japan) Momoko Kobori	6	6

Qualifying competition
(Finland) Anastasia Kulikova	6	2	7
5	(Japan) Momoko Kobori	1	6	5
