= 2026 Oeiras Indoors 1 – Singles =

Singles
- 2026 Oeiras Indoors 1

Final
- Champion: Alina Korneeva
- Runner-up: (Czech Republic) Darja Viďmanová
- Score: 7–5, 6–1

Details
- Draw: 32 (4Q / 4WC)
- Seeds: 8

Events
Singles	Doubles
- Oeiras Indoors

This was the first edition of the tournament.

Alina Korneeva won the title, defeating Darja Viďmanová 7–5, 6–1 in the final.

== Seeds ==
1. (Switzerland) Viktorija Golubic (second round)
2. (Hungary) Dalma Gálfi (quarterfinals)
3. (Netherlands) Suzan Lamens (quarterfinals)
4. (Andorra) Victoria Jiménez Kasintseva (first round)
5. (France) Tiantsoa Rakotomanga Rajaonah (first round)
6. (France) Diane Parry (withdrew)
7. (Belgium) Greet Minnen (second round)
8. (Poland) Linda Klimovičová (first round)
9. (Spain) Kaitlin Quevedo (second round)

== Draw ==
Key

- Q = Qualifier
- WC = Wild card
- LL = Lucky loser
- Alt = Alternate
- ITF = ITF entry
- PR = Protected ranking
- SR = Special ranking
- SE = Special exempt
- JE = Junior exempt
- JR = Junior Accelerator Programme entrant
- CO = College Accelerator Programme entrant
- NG = Next Gen Accelerator Program entrant
- w/o = Walkover
- r = Retired
- d = Defaulted

=== Finals ===
Semifinals
WC	(Portugal) Matilde Jorge	0	3
WC	Alina Korneeva	6	6
(Poland) Maja Chwalińska	4	6	6^{5}
(Czech Republic) Darja Viďmanová	6	3	7^{7}

Final
WC	Alina Korneeva	7	6
(Czech Republic) Darja Viďmanová	5	1

=== Top half ===
First round
1	(Switzerland) V Golubic	6	6^{4}	6
(Armenia) E Avanesyan	1	7^{7}	4
WC	(Portugal) A Voloshchuk	7^{7}	6^{6}	6^{4}
(Italy) L Stefanini	6^{4}	7^{8}	7^{7}
WC	(Portugal) M Jorge	6	7
Q	(United States) V Lepchenko	0	5
(Bulgaria) V Tomova	0	1
9	(Spain) K Quevedo	6	6
4	(Andorra) V Jiménez Kasintseva	4	4
(Spain) L Romero Gormaz	6	6
(Czech Republic) D Šalková	4	3
(Serbia) L Radivojević	6	6
(Germany) A-L Friedsam	6	0	0
WC	A Korneeva	3	6	6
Q	(Slovenia) D Jakupović	0	3
7	(Belgium) G Minnen	6	6

Second round
1	(Switzerland) V Golubic	0	7	5
(Italy) L Stefanini	6	5	7
WC	(Portugal) M Jorge	7	4	6
9	(Spain) K Quevedo	5	6	3
(Spain) L Romero Gormaz	6	6
(Serbia) L Radivojević	4	1
WC	A Korneeva	3	6	6
7	(Belgium) G Minnen	6	2	4

Quarterfinals
(Italy) L Stefanini	6	1	6^{6}
WC	(Portugal) M Jorge	2	6	7^{8}
(Spain) L Romero Gormaz	6^{1}	6^{4}
WC	A Korneeva	7^{7}	7^{7}

Semifinals
WC	(Portugal) M Jorge	0	3
WC	A Korneeva	6	6

=== Bottom half ===
First round
5	(France) T Rakotomanga Rajaonah	7^{7}	3	4
Q	(Spain) N Párrizas Díaz	6^{4}	6	6
(Poland) M Chwalińska	6	3	6
Q	(Germany) N Noha Akugue	2	6	1
I Shymanovich	5	6	6
(France) C Monnet	7	2	2
(Spain) A Bolsova	4	2
3	(Netherlands) S Lamens	6	6
8	(Poland) L Klimovičová	1	2
(Portugal) F Jorge	6	6
(Czech Republic) D Viďmanová	6	6
WC	(Portugal) G Agra Amorim	0	1
LL	(Chinese Taipei) E-s Liang	1	4
(Ukraine) A Kalinina	6	6
(United States) F Crawley	0	3
2	(Hungary) D Gálfi	6	6

Second round
Q	(Spain) N Párrizas Díaz	1	1
(Poland) M Chwalińska	6	6
I Shymanovich	4	0
3	(Netherlands) S Lamens	6	6
(Portugal) F Jorge	6	0	5
(Czech Republic) D Viďmanová	0	6	7
(Ukraine) A Kalinina	1	2
2	(Hungary) D Gálfi	6	6

Quarterfinals
(Poland) M Chwalińska	6	6
3	(Netherlands) S Lamens	1	2
(Czech Republic) D Viďmanová	6	5	6
2	(Hungary) D Gálfi	4	7	1

Semifinals
(Poland) M Chwalińska	4	6	6^{5}
(Czech Republic) D Viďmanová	6	3	7^{7}

== Qualifying ==
=== Seeds ===
1. (United States) Varvara Lepchenko (qualified)
2. (Spain) Ángela Fita Boluda (first round, retired)
3. (Spain) Nuria Párrizas Díaz (qualified)
4. (Germany) Noma Noha Akugue (qualified)
5. (United States) Carolyn Ansari (qualifying competition)
6. (Bulgaria) Isabella Shinikova (first round)
7. (Chinese Taipei) Liang En-shuo (qualifying competition, lucky loser)
8. (Slovenia) Dalila Jakupović (qualified)

=== Qualifiers ===
1. (United States) Varvara Lepchenko
2. (Slovenia) Dalila Jakupović
3. (Spain) Nuria Párrizas Díaz
4. (Germany) Noma Noha Akugue

=== Lucky loser ===
1. (Chinese Taipei) Liang En-shuo

=== Qualifying draw ===
==== First qualifier ====
First round
1	(United States) Varvara Lepchenko	3	7	7^{8}
(Switzerland) Ylena In-Albon	6	5	6^{6}
(United Kingdom) Emily Appleton	3	6	4
5	(United States) Carolyn Ansari	6	1	6

Qualifying competition
1	(United States) Varvara Lepchenko	6	6
5	(United States) Carolyn Ansari	4	4

==== Second qualifier ====
First round
2	(Spain) Ángela Fita Boluda	0^{r}
(Croatia) Lucija Ćirić Bagarić	3
WC	(Portugal) Analu Freitas	2	0
8	(Slovenia) Dalila Jakupović	6	6

Qualifying competition
(Croatia) Lucija Ćirić Bagarić	3	4
8	(Slovenia) Dalila Jakupović	6	6

==== Third qualifier ====
First round
3	(Spain) Nuria Párrizas Díaz	6	6
(France) Yasmine Mansouri	3	3
(United Kingdom) Naiktha Bains	3	6	6
6	(Bulgaria) Isabella Shinikova	6	2	4

Qualifying competition
3	(Spain) Nuria Párrizas Díaz	6	6
(United Kingdom) Naiktha Bains	4	3

==== Fourth qualifier ====
First round
4	(Germany) Noma Noha Akugue	6	6
WC	(Portugal) Sara Lança	2	0
(Spain) Sara Sorribes Tormo	6	5	4
7	(Chinese Taipei) Liang En-shuo	2	7	6

Qualifying competition
4	(Germany) Noma Noha Akugue	6	6
7	(Chinese Taipei) Liang En-shuo	1	2
