= 2026 Figueira da Foz International Ladies Open – Doubles =

Doubles
- 2026 Figueira da Foz International Ladies Open

Final
- Champions: (Slovakia) Viktória Hrunčáková (Slovakia) Katarína Kužmová
- Runners-up: (Australia) Elena Micic (France) Kristina Mladenovic
- Score: 6–4, 6–4

Details
- Draw: 8 (1WC)
- Seeds: 2

Events
Singles	Doubles
- Figueira da Foz International Ladies Open

Aneta Laboutková and Justina Mikulskytė were the defending champions, but Laboutková chose to compete in Brescia instead and Mikulskytė chose not to play this year.

Viktória Hrunčáková and Katarína Kužmová won the title, defeating Elena Micic and Kristina Mladenovic 6–4, 6–4 in the final.

== Seeds ==
1. (China) Feng Shuo / (Japan) Momoko Kobori (quarterfinals)
2. (India) Rutuja Bhosale / (France) Estelle Cascino (quarterfinals)

== Draw ==
Key

- Q = Qualifier
- WC = Wild card
- LL = Lucky loser
- Alt = Alternate
- ITF = ITF entry
- PR = Protected ranking
- SR = Special ranking
- SE = Special exempt
- JE = Junior exempt
- JR = Junior Accelerator Programme entrant
- CO = College Accelerator Programme entrant
- NG = Next Gen Accelerator Program entrant
- w/o = Walkover
- r = Retired
- d = Defaulted

=== Draw ===
Quarterfinals
1	(China) S Feng (Japan) M Kobori	2	4
(United Kingdom) M Brooks (United States) A Smith	6	6
(Australia) E Micic (France) K Mladenovic	6	6
(Czech Republic) D Vidmanova (United States) A Zamarripa	3	3
WC	(Finland) A Kulikova (Portugal) A Voloshchuk	5	4
(Portugal) M Jorge (Poland) M Kubka	7	6
(Slovakia) V Hrunčáková (Slovakia) K Kužmová	6	6
2	(India) R Bhosale (France) E Cascino	4	4

Semifinals
(United Kingdom) M Brooks (United States) A Smith	6^{3}	6	[6]
(Australia) E Micic (France) K Mladenovic	7^{7}	4	[10]
(Portugal) M Jorge (Poland) M Kubka	2	7	[4]
(Slovakia) V Hrunčáková (Slovakia) K Kužmová	6	5	[10]

Final
(Australia) E Micic (France) K Mladenovic	4	4
(Slovakia) V Hrunčáková (Slovakia) K Kužmová	6	6
