= 2026 Oeiras Indoors 1 – Doubles =

Doubles
- 2026 Oeiras Indoors 1

Final
- Champion: (United States) Carmen Corley (United States) Ivana Corley
- Runner-up: (United Kingdom) Emily Appleton (Japan) Makoto Ninomiya
- Score: 2–6, 6–0, [10–4]

Details
- Draw: 16 (1 WC)
- Seeds: 4

Events
Singles	Doubles
- Oeiras Indoors

This was the first edition of the tournament.

Carmen and Ivana Corley won the title, defeating Emily Appleton and Makoto Ninomiya 2–6, 6–0, [10–4] in the final.

== Seeds ==
1. (United Kingdom) Emily Appleton / (Japan) Makoto Ninomiya (final)
2. (United Kingdom) Maia Lumsden / (China) Tang Qianhui (quarterfinals)
3. (Hong Kong) Eudice Chong / (Chinese Taipei) Liang En-shuo (first round)
4. (Spain) Yvonne Cavallé Reimers / (Italy) Angelica Moratelli (first round)

== Draw ==
Key

- Q = Qualifier
- WC = Wild card
- LL = Lucky loser
- Alt = Alternate
- ITF = ITF entry
- PR = Protected ranking
- SR = Special ranking
- SE = Special exempt
- JE = Junior exempt
- JR = Junior Accelerator Programme entrant
- CO = College Accelerator Programme entrant
- NG = Next Gen Accelerator Program entrant
- w/o = Walkover
- r = Retired
- d = Defaulted

First round
1	(United Kingdom) E Appleton (Japan) M Ninomiya	6	7^{7}
(Slovenia) D Jakupović (Slovenia) N Radišić	4	6^{5}
(France) C Monnet (France) T Rakotomanga Rajaonah	7	6
(Belgium) G Minnen (Bulgaria) V Tomova	5	0
4	(Spain) Y Cavallé Reimers (Italy) A Moratelli	1	2
(France) E Cascino (China) S Feng	6	6
(Andorra) V Jiménez Kasintseva (Czech Republic) D Šalková	7^{7}	6
(United Kingdom) F Christie (United Kingdom) E Silva	6^{1}	0
(Chinese Taipei) I-h Cho (Chinese Taipei) Y-t Cho	6^{6}	6	[12]
(Romania) I Bara; I Shymanovich	7^{8}	3	[14]
(United States) C Corley (United States) I Corley	6	6
3	(Hong Kong) E Chong (Chinese Taipei) E-s Liang	4	3
(Hungary) D Gálfi (Switzerland) V Golubic	1	3
(Portugal) F Jorge (Portugal) M Jorge	6	6
WC	(Portugal) T Franco Dias (Portugal) S Lança	0	0
2	(United Kingdom) M Lumsden (China) Q Tang	6	6

Quarterfinals
1	(United Kingdom) E Appleton (Japan) M Ninomiya	6	6
(France) C Monnet (France) T Rakotomanga Rajaonah	3	2
(France) E Cascino (China) S Feng	6	6
(Andorra) V Jiménez Kasintseva (Czech Republic) D Šalková	3	0
(Romania) I Bara; I Shymanovich	3	4
(United States) C Corley (United States) I Corley	6	6
(Portugal) F Jorge (Portugal) M Jorge	7	6
2	(United Kingdom) M Lumsden (China) Q Tang	5	2

Semifinals
1	(United Kingdom) E Appleton (Japan) M Ninomiya	6	6
(France) E Cascino (China) S Feng	3	3
(United States) C Corley (United States) I Corley	w/o
(Portugal) F Jorge (Portugal) M Jorge

Final
1	(United Kingdom) E Appleton (Japan) M Ninomiya	6	0	[4]
(United States) C Corley (United States) I Corley	2	6	[10]
