= 2025 Figueira da Foz International Ladies Open – Singles =

Singles
- 2025 Figueira da Foz International Ladies Open

Final
- Champion: Maria Timofeeva
- Runner-up: Alina Korneeva
- Score: 6–3, 6–0

Events
Singles	Doubles
- Figueira da Foz International Ladies Open

Anastasia Zakharova was the defending champion but chose to compete in Washington qualifying instead.

Maria Timofeeva won the title, defeating Alina Korneeva in the final, 6–3, 6–0.

== Seeds ==
1. (Switzerland) Céline Naef (first round, retired)
2. Elena Pridankina (second round)
3. (France) Tiantsoa Sarah Rakotomanga Rajaonah (first round)
4. (Thailand) Lanlana Tararudee (quarterfinals)
5. (Belgium) Sofia Costoulas (quarterfinals)
6. (France) Tessah Andrianjafitrimo (second round)
7. (France) Carole Monnet (second round)
8. (United States) Hina Inoue (second round)

== Draw ==
Key

- Q = Qualifier
- WC = Wild card
- LL = Lucky loser
- Alt = Alternate
- ITF = ITF entry
- PR = Protected ranking
- SR = Special ranking
- SE = Special exempt
- JE = Junior exempt
- JR = Junior Accelerator Programme entrant
- CO = College Accelerator Programme entrant
- NG = Next Gen Accelerator Program entrant
- w/o = Walkover
- r = Retired
- d = Defaulted

=== Finals ===
Semifinals
(Kazakhstan) Zarina Diyas	2	2
Q	Maria Timofeeva	6	6
Q	Alina Korneeva	4	7	6
Q	(Netherlands) Eva Vedder	6	5	1

Final
Q	Maria Timofeeva	6	6
Q	Alina Korneeva	3	0

=== Top half ===
First round
1	(Switzerland) C Naef	6^{3}	6	1^{r}
(Portugal) F Jorge	7^{7}	2	4
Q	(Chinese Taipei) E-s Liang	1	1
(Brazil) L Pigossi	6	6
(Kazakhstan) Z Diyas	6	6
LL	(Latvia) D Marcinkēviča	1	0
(Australia) L Cabrera	0	5
6	(France) T Andrianjafitrimo	6	7
4	(Thailand) L Tararudee	6	4	6
Q	(China) H Guo	3	6	3
WC	(Portugal) A Voloshchuk	0	6	4
(Spain) M Bassols Ribera	6	1	6
WC	(Portugal) T Franco Dias	2	0
Q	M Timofeeva	6	6
Q	(China) H Shi	2	4
7	(France) C Monnet	6	6

Second round
(Portugal) F Jorge	4	7	6
(Brazil) L Pigossi	6	5	1
(Kazakhstan) Z Diyas	6	6
6	(France) T Andrianjafitrimo	3	4
4	(Thailand) L Tararudee	6	6
(Spain) M Bassols Ribera	1	0
Q	M Timofeeva	6	6
7	(France) C Monnet	2	1

Quarterfinals
(Portugal) F Jorge	3	1
(Kazakhstan) Z Diyas	6	6
4	(Thailand) L Tararudee	2	2
Q	M Timofeeva	6	6

Semifinals
(Kazakhstan) Z Diyas	2	2
Q	M Timofeeva	6	6

=== Bottom half ===
First round
8	(United States) H Inoue	6	6
WC	(Portugal) AF Santos	1	0
Q	A Korneeva	6	6
Q	(United States) E Bektas	1	4
(Japan) H Kaji	6	1	0
(Czech Republic) G Knutson	2	6	6
Q	(Spain) M Martínez Vaquero	6	6
3	(France) TS Rakotomanga Rajaonah	0	3
5	(Belgium) S Costoulas	6	6
(Lithuania) J Mikulskytė	1	4
LL	(Bulgaria) I Shinikova	6	6
(Australia) T Preston	4	3
Q	(Netherlands) E Vedder	7	6
(Portugal) M Jorge	5	2
WC	(Portugal) A Suciu	0	0
2	E Pridankina	6	6

Second round
8	(United States) H Inoue	4	4
Q	A Korneeva	6	6
(Czech Republic) G Knutson	4	1
Q	(Spain) M Martínez Vaquero	6	6
5	(Belgium) S Costoulas	6	6
LL	(Bulgaria) I Shinikova	3	4
Q	(Netherlands) E Vedder	6	3	6
2	E Pridankina	2	6	1

Quarterfinals
Q	A Korneeva	7	6
Q	(Spain) M Martínez Vaquero	5	1
5	(Belgium) S Costoulas	5	4
Q	(Netherlands) E Vedder	7	6

Semifinals
Q	A Korneeva	4	7	6
Q	(Netherlands) E Vedder	6	5	1
