= 2026 Figueira da Foz International Ladies Open =

- Date: 15–21 June
- Edition: 10th
- Category: WTA 125
- Draw: 32S / 8D
- Prize money: €100,000
- Surface: Hard
- Location: Figueira da Foz, Portugal
- Venue: Ténis Club da Figueira da Foz

Champions

Singles
- (Czech Republic) Darja Vidmanova

Doubles
- (Slovakia) Viktória Hrunčáková / (Slovakia) Katarína Kužmová
- Figueira da Foz International Ladies Open

The 2026 Figueira da Foz Ladies Open was a professional women's tennis tournament played on outdoor hard courts. It was the tenth edition of the tournament and first as a WTA 125 tournament, which is also part of the 2026 WTA 125 Circuit. It took place in Figueira da Foz, Portugal, from 15 through 21 June 2026.

== Singles main draw entrants ==
=== Seeds ===
Country	Player	Rank^{†}	Seed
	Alina Korneeva	96	1
BRA	Beatriz Haddad Maia	108	2
CZE	Darja Vidmanova	119	3
	Alina Charaeva	129	4
SUI	Jil Teichmann	131	5
ITA	Lucrezia Stefanini	169	6
SUI	Susan Bandecchi	171	7
BEL	Jeline Vandromme	176	8

^{†} Ranking are as of 8 June 2026.

=== Other entrants ===
The following players received wildcards into the singles main draw :

- Alina Charaeva
- (Brazil) Beatriz Haddad Maia
- Alina Korneeva
- (France) Kristina Mladenovic

The following players received entry into the main draw through protected ranking :

- (United States) Sachia Vickery
- Vera Zvonareva

The following players received entry from the qualifying draw :

- (Finland) Anastasia Kulikova
- (Switzerland) Valentina Ryser
- (Portugal) Angelina Voloshchuk
- (United States) Allura Zamarripa

=== Withdrawals ===
Before the tournament

- (Canada) Cadence Brace → replaced by (China) Tian Fangran
- (Czech Republic) Laura Samson → replaced by (France) Manon Léonard
- (Czech Republic) Anna Sisková → replaced by (Slovakia) Viktória Morvayová
- (France) Harmony Tan → replaced by (United States) Carolyn Ansari
- (Ukraine) Katarina Zavatska → replaced by (Australia) Elena Micic

During the tournament

- (United States) Sachia Vickery (left knee injury)

=== Retirements ===
- Aliona Falei (right shoulder injury)

== Doubles main draw entrants ==
=== Seeds ===
Country	Player	Country	Player	Rank^{1}	Seed
CHN	Feng Shuo	JPN	Momoko Kobori	199	1
IND	Rutuja Bhosale	FRA	Estelle Cascino	233	2

- ^{1} Rankings as of 8 June 2026.

=== Other entrants ===
The following pairs received a wildcard into the doubles main draw:

- (Finland) Anastasia Kulikova / (Portugal) Angelina Voloshchuk

== Finals ==
=== Singles ===
- (Czech Republic) Darja Vidmanova def. (Turkey) Ayla Aksu 6–2, 6–3

=== Doubles ===
- (Slovakia) Viktória Hrunčáková / (Slovakia) Katarína Kužmová def. (Australia) Elena Micic / (France) Kristina Mladenovic, 6–4, 6–4
