= Sayaka Ishii =

Japanese tennis player (born 2005)

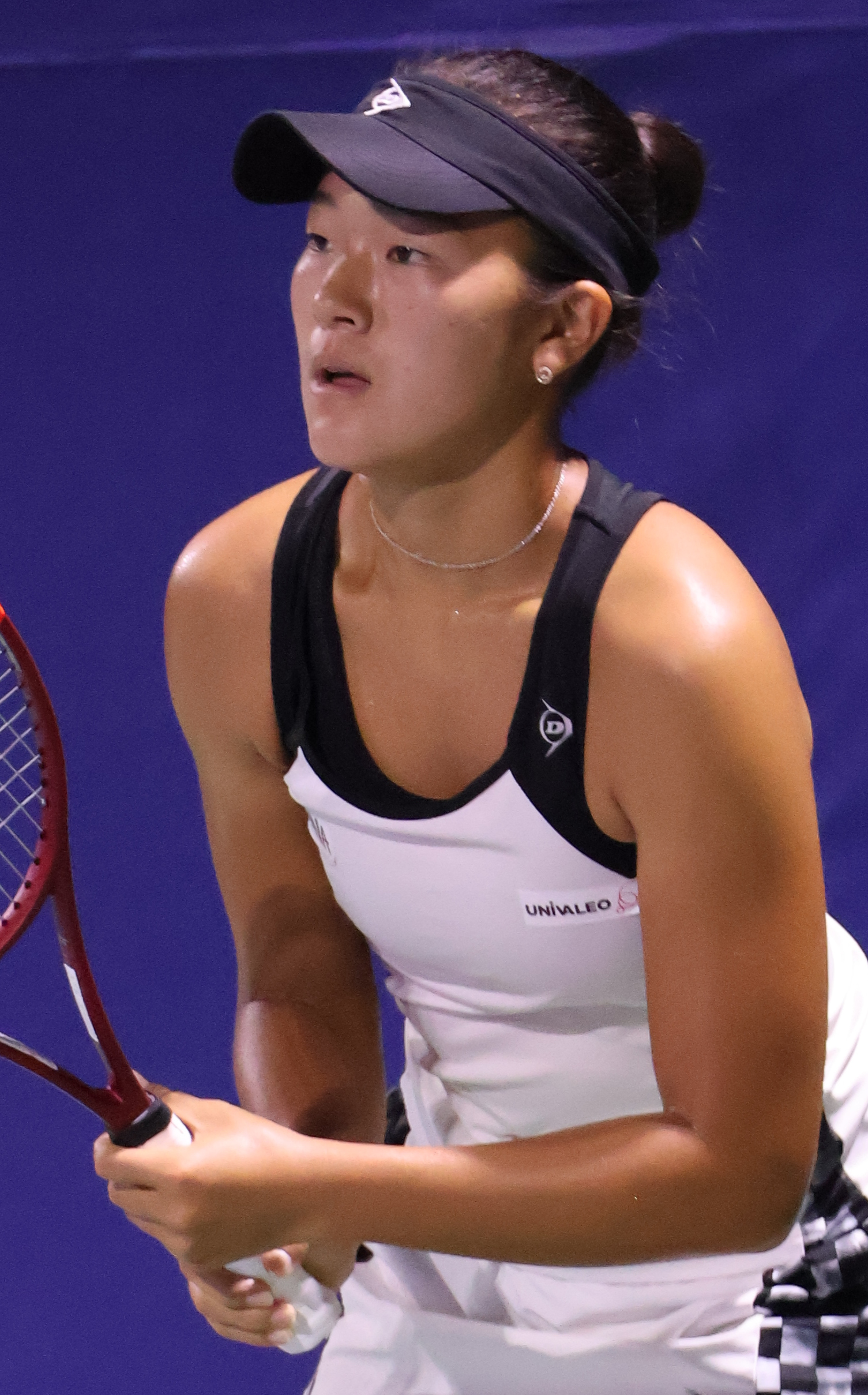
- Ishii at the 2024 Cary Tennis Classic
- Native name: 石井さやか
- Country (sports): Japan
- Born: 31 August 2005 (age 21) Tokyo, Japan
- Height: 1.73 m (5 ft 8 in)
- Plays: Right (two-handed backhand)
- Prize money: $241,828

Singles
- Career record: 137–90
- Career titles: 1 ITF
- Highest ranking: No. 188 (17 March 2025)
- Current ranking: No. 556 (26 October 2026)

Grand Slam singles results
- Australian Open: Q2 (2025)
- French Open: Q1 (2025)
- Wimbledon: Q1 (2025, 2026)

Doubles
- Career record: 33–32
- Career titles: 1 ITF
- Highest ranking: No. 285 (19 May 2025)
- Current ranking: No. 741 (26 October 2026)
- Last updated on: 29 October 2026.

Sayaka Ishii (石井さやか, Ishii Sayaka; born 31 August 2005) is a Japanese professional tennis player. She has career-high rankings of world No. 188 in singles, achieved on 17 March 2025, and No. 285 in doubles, reached on 19 May 2025.

== Early life ==
Ishii was born in Shibuya, Tokyo. Her father, Takuro Ishii, is a former professional baseball player, and her mother, Shiori Arase, is a former Fuji Television announcer. She trained at the IMG Academy in Bradenton, Florida.

== Career ==
=== Juniors ===
In 2022, she reached the final of the Osaka Mayor's Cup, but lost to compatriot Sara Saito.

=== Professional ===
In July 2024, she and compatriot Naho Sato won the doubles title at the Figueira da Foz International Ladies Open. The following month, she made her WTA Tour debut after qualifying for Tennis in the Land, but lost to third seed Kateřina Siniaková in three sets. In October 2024, she qualified for her second main draw at the Toray Pan Pacific Open with a defeat over top qualifying seed Clara Tauson. She then recorded her first WTA Tour wins over compatriot and lucky loser Sara Saito and qualifier Zeynep Sönmez to reach her first WTA 500-level quarterfinal. Ishii withdrew with an abdominal injury before her last eight match with sixth seed Diana Shnaider. As a result, she reached a career-high ranking of No. 203 on 28 October 2024.

In March 2025, she received a wildcard into the main draw of the Miami Open, but lost in the first round to Emma Raducanu.

== Performance timelines ==
Key
W	F	SF	QF	#R	RR	Q#	DNQ	A	NH

(W) winner; (F) finalist; (SF) semifinalist; (QF) quarterfinalist; (#R) rounds 4, 3, 2, 1; (RR) round-robin stage; (Q#) qualification round; (DNQ) did not qualify; (A) absent; (NH) not held; (SR) strike rate (events won / competed); (W–L) win–loss record.
To avoid confusion and double counting, these charts are updated at the conclusion of a tournament or when the player's participation has ended.

Only main-draw results in WTA Tour, Grand Slam tournaments, Billie Jean King Cup, United Cup, Hopman Cup and Olympic Games are included in win–loss records.

== ITF Circuit finals ==
=== Singles: 3 (1 title, 2 runner-ups) ===
Legend W25/35 tournaments (1–1) W15 tournaments (0–1)	Finals by surface Hard (1–2)

Result	W–L	Date	Tournament	Tier	Surface	Opponent	Score
Loss	0–1	Jun 2022	ITF Monastir, Tunisia	W15	Hard	(Malta) Francesca Curmi	2–6, 6–4, 5–7
Loss	0–2	Oct 2023	ITF Redding, United States	W25	Hard	(United States) Iva Jovic	4–6, 2–6
Win	1–2	Apr 2024	ITF Osaka, Japan	W35	Hard	(Canada) Stacey Fung	6–1, 3–6, 6–3

=== Doubles: 3 (1 title, 2 runner-ups) ===
Legend W100 tournaments (1–0) W35 tournaments (0–2)	Finals by surface Hard (1–2)

Result	W–L	Date	Tournament	Tier	Surface	Partner	Opponents	Score
Loss	0–1	Feb 2024	Traralgon International, Australia	W35	Hard	(Thailand) Lanlana Tararudee	(Japan) Mana Kawamura (China) Liu Fangzhou	7–6^{(4)}, 3–6, [11–13]
Win	1–1	Jul 2024	Figueira da Foz Open, Portugal	W100	Hard	(Japan) Naho Sato	(United Kingdom) Madeleine Brooks (United Kingdom) Sarah Beth Grey	7–6^{(1)}, 7–5
Loss	1–2	Sep 2026	ITF Kyoto, Japan	W35	Hard (i)	(Japan) Kanon Sawashiro	(Japan) Hiromi Abe (United Kingdom) Amelia Rajecki	6–3, 2–6, [7–10]
