= Evialina Laskevich =

Belarusian tennis player (born 2004)

- Country (sports): Belarus
- Born: 10 November 2004 (age 22)
- Plays: Right (two-handed backhand)
- Prize money: $68,142

Singles
- Career record: 136–69
- Career titles: 5 ITF
- Highest ranking: No. 319 (16 December 2024)
- Current ranking: No. 513 (16 November 2026)

Doubles
- Career record: 61–43
- Career titles: 3 ITF
- Highest ranking: No. 317 (29 July 2024)
- Current ranking: No. 653 (16 November 2026)
- Last updated on: 19 November 2026.

Evialina Jurjeŭna Laskevich (Belarusian: Эвяліна Юр’еўна Ласкевіч born 10 November 2004) is a Belarusian professional tennis player.

Laskevich has a career-high WTA singles ranking of 319, achieved on 16 December 2024. She also has a career-high doubles ranking of world No. 317, achieved on 29 July 2024.

Laskevich won her first bigger ITF title in April 2024, at the W50 event in Lopota, Georgia.

== ITF Circuit finals ==
=== Singles: 7 (5 titles, 2 runner-ups) ===
Legend W50 tournaments W35 tournaments W15 tournaments	Finals by surface Hard (5–1) Clay (0–1)

Result	W–L	Date	Tournament	Tier	Surface	Opponent	Score
Loss	0–1	Apr 2021	ITF Shymkent, Kazakhstan	W15	Clay	(United States) Jessie Aney	4–6, 2–6
Loss	0–2	Mar 2024	ITF Monastir, Tunisia	W15	Hard	(Slovakia) Radka Zelníčková	7–5, 3–6, 2–6
Win	1–2	Mar 2024	ITF Monastir, Tunisia	W15	Hard	(Serbia) Elena Milovanović	6–1, 6–1
Win	2–2	Apr 2024	ITF Lopota, Georgia	W50	Hard	(Israel) Lina Glushko	6–4, 6–1
Win	3–2	Jun 2026	ITF Zhengzhou, China	W35	Hard	(China) Wang Jiaqi	6–1, 6–4
Win	4–2	Jun 2026	ITF Ma'anshan, China	W15	Hard (i)	(China) Guo Meiqi	6–1, 4–6, 6–1
Win	5–2	Nov 2026	ITF Orlando, United States	W35	Hard	(United States) Janae Preston	6–2, 3–6, 6–3

=== Doubles: 10 (3 titles, 7 runner-ups) ===
Result	W–L	Date	Tournament	Tier	Surface	Partner	Opponents	Score
Loss	0–1	May 2022	ITF Antalya, Turkiye	W15	Clay	(Sweden) Izabelle Persson	(Russia) Yana Karpovich (Russia) Daria Lodikova	5–7, 7–6^{(2)}, [8–10]
Loss	0–2	Mar 2023	ITF Gonesse, France	W15	Clay	(Switzerland) Karolina Kozakova	(Germany) Antonia Schmidt (Romania) Arina Gabriela Vasilescu	5–7, 3–6
Loss	0–3	Apr 2023	ITF Kuršumlijska Banja, Serbia	W15	Clay	(Slovakia) Laura Cíleková	(Netherlands) Madelief Hageman (Sweden) Maja Radenkovic	3–6, 6–4, [6–10]
Loss	0–4	Oct 2023	ITF Loulé, Portugal	W25	Hard	(Belarus) Daria Khomutsianskaya	(Czech Republic) Dominika Šalková (Hungary) Natália Szabanin	6–4, 2–6, [1–10]
Win	1–4	Jan 2024	ITF Sharm El Sheikh, Egypt	W35	Hard	(Belarus) Daria Khomutsianskaya	(Czech Republic) Linda Klimovičová (Bulgaria) Isabella Shinikova	6–4, 6–2
Loss	1–5	Feb 2024	ITF Sharm El Sheikh, Egypt	W15	Hard	(Belarus) Daria Khomutsianskaya	(Romania) Karola Patricia Bejenaru (Russia) Ekaterina Shalimova	4–6, 2–6
Win	2–5	Mar 2024	ITF Monastir, Tunisia	W15	Hard	(Slovakia) Radka Zelníčková	(Serbia) Elena Milovanović (Bulgaria) Isabella Shinikova	6–0, 6–1
Loss	2–6	Jun 2024	ITF Montemor-o-Novo, Portugal	W50	Hard	(Switzerland) Leonie Küng	(United Kingdom) Madeleine Brooks (Hong Kong) Eudice Chong	4–6, 4–6
Loss	2–7	Sep 2026	Berkeley Club Challenge, United States	W50	Hard	(Japan) Reina Goto	(Venezuela) Sofía Cabezas Domínguez (United States) Katherine Hui	6–3, 4–6, [7–10]
Win	3–7	Oct 2026	ITF Norman, United States	W35	Hard	Edda Mamedova	(United States) Ashley Lahey (Canada) Alexandra Vagramov	4–6, 6–4, [10–8]
