= Figueira da Foz International Ladies Open =

Figueira da Foz Ladies Open
- 2026 Figueira da Foz International Ladies Open

WTA 125
- Event name: Figueira da Foz Ladies Open
- Location: Figueira da Foz, Portugal
- Venue: Ténis Club da Figueira da Foz
- Category: WTA 125
- Surface: Hard / Outdoor
- Draw: 32S/16Q/8D
- Prize money: €100,000

Current champions (2026)
- Singles: (Czech Republic) Darja Viďmanová
- Doubles: (Slovakia) Viktória Hrunčáková (Slovakia) Katarína Kužmová

The Figueira da Foz Ladies Open is a tournament for professional female tennis players. The event on outdoor hardcourts is classified as a WTA 125 event since 2026 after being upgraded from $100,000 ITF Women's World Tennis Tour tournament. Prior to 2023, it was held as a $25,000 ITF tournament. It has been held in Figueira da Foz, Portugal, since 2017.

== Past finals ==
=== Singles ===
Year	Champion	Runner-up	Score
2026	(Czech Republic) Darja Vidmanova	(Turkey) Ayla Aksu	6–2, 6–3
↑ WTA 125 ↑
2025	Maria Timofeeva	Alina Korneeva	6–3, 6–0
2024	Anastasia Zakharova	(France) Kristina Mladenovic	6–2, 6–1
2023	Alina Korneeva	(France) Carole Monnet	6–0, 6–0
2022	(United States) Jamie Loeb	(Australia) Kimberly Birrell	7–5, 6–4
2021	(France) Tessah Andrianjafitrimo	(France) Jessika Ponchet	6–7^{(3–7)}, 6–1, 6–0
2020	(Spain) Georgina García Pérez	(Brazil) Beatriz Haddad Maia	6–7^{(10–12)}, 7–5, 6–4
2019	(Turkey) İpek Soylu	(Canada) Katherine Sebov	6–7^{(2–7)}, 7–6^{(7–5)}, 6–3
2018	(France) Jessika Ponchet	(Spain) Eva Guerrero Álvarez	7–6^{(7–4)}, 6–2
2017	(Spain) María Teresa Torró Flor	(Germany) Sarah-Rebecca Sekulic	6–4, 6–2

=== Doubles ===
Year	Champions	Runners-up	Score
2026	(Slovakia) Viktória Hrunčáková (Slovakia) Katarína Kužmová	(Australia) Elena Micic (France) Kristina Mladenovic	6–4, 6–4
↑ WTA 125 ↑
2025	(Czech Republic) Aneta Laboutková (Lithuania) Justina Mikulskytė	(Portugal) Francisca Jorge (Portugal) Matilde Jorge	6–4, 3–6, [10–6]
2024	(Japan) Sayaka Ishii (Japan) Naho Sato	(United Kingdom) Madeleine Brooks (United Kingdom) Sarah Beth Grey	7–6^{(7–1)}, 7–5
2023	(Hong Kong) Eudice Chong (Netherlands) Arianne Hartono	Alina Korneeva; Anastasia Tikhonova	6–3, 6–2
2022	(Australia) Alexandra Bozovic (Portugal) Francisca Jorge (2)	(Chinese Taipei) Lee Pei-chi (Chinese Taipei) Wu Fang-hsien	6–2, 3–6, [12–10]
2021	(United Kingdom) Alicia Barnett (United Kingdom) Olivia Nicholls	(Turkey) Berfu Cengiz (Russia) Anastasia Tikhonova	6–3, 7–6^{(7–3)}
2020	(Brazil) Ingrid Gamarra Martins (Brazil) Beatriz Haddad Maia	(Sweden) Jacqueline Cabaj Awad (Portugal) Inês Murta	7–5, 6–1
2019	(Portugal) Francisca Jorge (Spain) Olga Parres Azcoitia	(Brazil) Laura Pigossi (Japan) Moyuka Uchijima	6–4, 4–6, [11–9]
2018	(Spain) Yvonne Cavallé Reimers (Venezuela) Andrea Gámiz	(Belarus) Sviatlana Pirazhenka (France) Jessika Ponchet	6–2, 7–5
2017	(Turkey) Ayla Aksu (Romania) Raluca Șerban	(Colombia) María Herazo González (Mexico) Victoria Rodríguez	6–4, 6–1
