= Sarah Beth Grey =

British tennis player (born 1995)

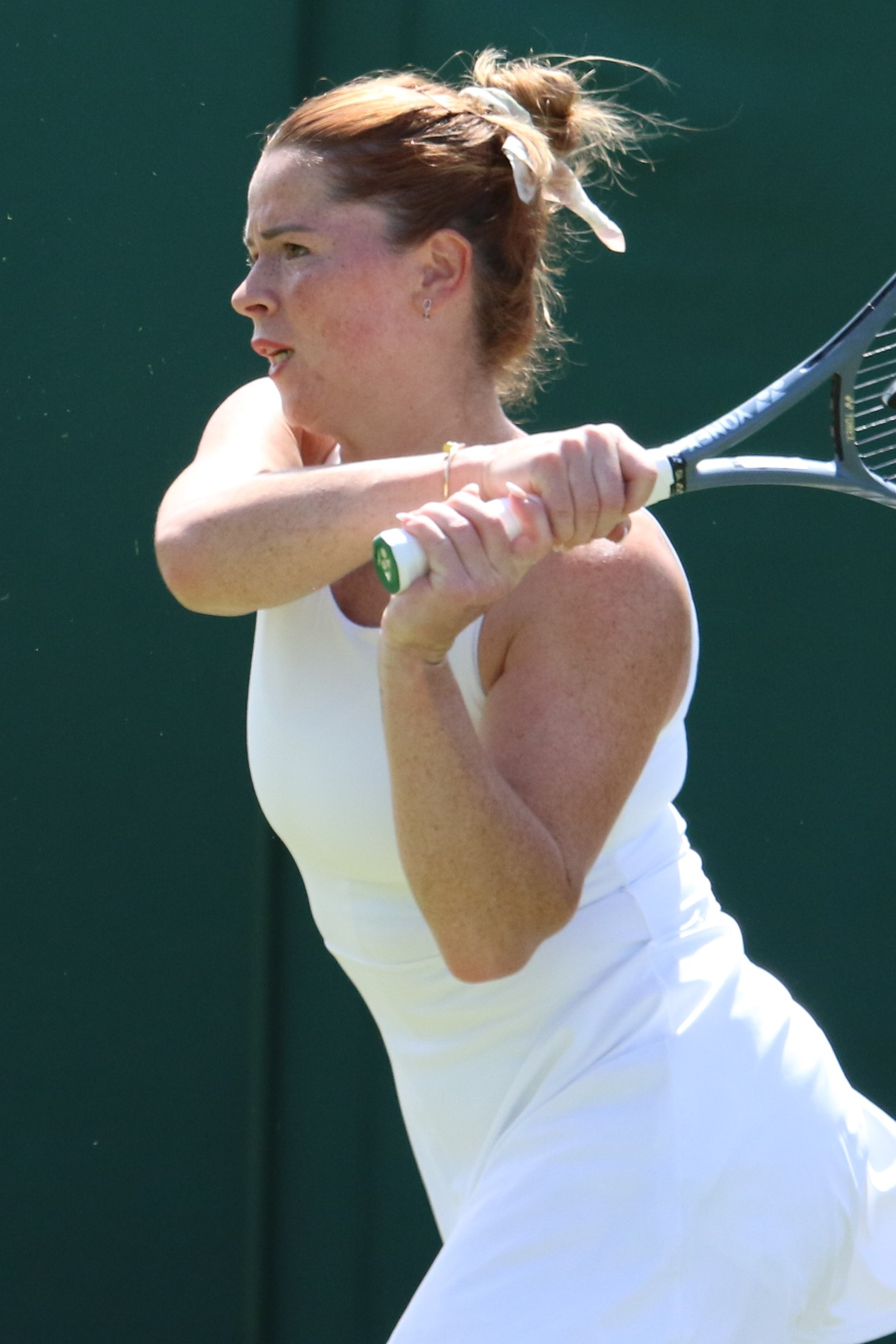
- Grey at the 2022 Wimbledon Championships
- Country (sports): United Kingdom
- Residence: Wendover, Buckinghamshire
- Born: 10 August 1995 (age 31) Liverpool, England
- Height: 1.68 m (5 ft 6 in)
- Plays: Left (two-handed backhand)
- Prize money: $250,043

Singles
- Career record: 229–247
- Career titles: 1 ITF
- Highest ranking: No. 277 (1 August 2022)

Grand Slam singles results
- Wimbledon: Q2 (2022)

Doubles
- Career record: 268–165
- Career titles: 26 ITF
- Highest ranking: No. 128 (5 August 2024)

Grand Slam doubles results
- Wimbledon: 1R (2021, 2022, 2024)

Grand Slam mixed doubles results
- Wimbledon: 1R (2019, 2021)

Sarah Beth Grey (born 10 August 1995; formerly known as Sarah Beth Askew) is a British inactive tennis player who had specialized in doubles. She has a career-high doubles ranking of world No. 128, achieved on 5 August 2024. She also has a best singles ranking of No. 277, achieved on 1 August 2022. Grey won one singles title and 26 doubles titles on the ITF Women's Circuit.

She made her WTA Tour main-draw debut at the 2019 Dubai Tennis Championships, after receiving a wildcard into the doubles event, partnering Eden Silva. Grey made her singles WTA Tour debut as a qualifier at the 2021 Nottingham Open, losing in the first round to Leonie Küng.

== Personal life ==
Grey was born in Liverpool and grew up in one of its suburbs, West Derby. She lives in Wendover and trains at Halton Tennis Centre in Buckinghamshire. She has three older sisters, a younger brother, and two younger half-brothers.

Although standing at only 5ft 6, Grey describes her serve as her favourite shot and she enjoys playing on grass courts.

In February 2022, Grey successfully underwent cardiac ablation surgery to correct a potentially dangerous abnormal heart rhythm.

== Grand Slam performance timeline ==
Key
W	F	SF	QF	#R	RR	Q#	DNQ	A	NH

(W) winner; (F) finalist; (SF) semifinalist; (QF) quarterfinalist; (#R) rounds 4, 3, 2, 1; (RR) round-robin stage; (Q#) qualification round; (DNQ) did not qualify; (A) absent; (NH) not held; (SR) strike rate (events won / competed); (W–L) win–loss record.
To avoid confusion and double counting, these charts are updated at the conclusion of a tournament or when the player's participation has ended.

=== Doubles ===
Tournament	2021	2022	2023	2024	W–L
Australian Open	A	A	A	A	0–0
French Open	A	A	A	A	0–0
Wimbledon	1R	1R	A	1R	0–3
US Open	A	A	A	A	0–0
Win–Loss	0–1	0–1	0–0	0–1	0–3

== ITF Circuit finals ==
=== Singles: 1 (title) ===
Legend W25 tournaments	Finals by surface Carpet (1–0)

Result	W–L	Date	Tournament	Tier	Surface	Opponent	Score
Win	1–0	Dec 2021	ITF Jablonec nad Nisou, Czech Republic	W25	Carpet (i)	(Finland) Anastasia Kulikova	6–2, 6–2

=== Doubles: 50 (26 titles, 24 runner-ups) ===
Legend W100 tournaments W80 tournaments W60/75 tournaments W50 tournaments W25/35 tournaments W10/15 tournaments	Finals by surface Hard (22–20) Clay (3–3) Grass (0–1) Carpet (1–0)

Result	W–L	Date	Tournament	Tier	Surface	Partner	Opponents	Score
Win	1–0	Nov 2013	ITF Rethymno, Greece	W10	Hard	(United Kingdom) Katy Dunne	(Russia) Margarita Lazareva (Netherlands) Lisanne van Riet	2–6, 6–4, [10–5]
Loss	1–1	Apr 2014	ITF Gloucester, United Kingdom	W10	Hard (i)	(United Kingdom) Katy Dunne	(United Kingdom) Lucy Brown (Sweden) Hilda Melander	5–7, 3–6
Win	2–1	Nov 2015	GB Pro-Series Bath, UK	W25	Hard (i)	(United Kingdom) Olivia Nicholls	(United Kingdom) Freya Christie (United Kingdom) Lisa Whybourn	1–6, 6–4, [10–2]
Win	3–1	Feb 2016	ITF Wirral, United Kingdom	W10	Hard (i)	(United Kingdom) Olivia Nicholls	(United States) Veronica Corning (United Kingdom) Harriet Dart	6–2, 1–6, [10–8]
Win	4–1	Sep 2016	ITF Nottingham, UK	W10	Hard (i)	(United Kingdom) Olivia Nicholls	(United States) Dasha Ivanova (France) Margot Yerolymos	6–2, 1–6, [10–8]
Loss	4–2	Oct 2016	GB Pro-Series Loughborough, UK	W10	Hard (i)	(United Kingdom) Olivia Nicholls	(United States) Dasha Ivanova (Czech Republic) Petra Krejsová	6–7^{(2)}, 6–7^{(2)}
Win	5–2	Nov 2016	ITF Sheffield, United Kingdom	W10	Hard (i)	(United Kingdom) Olivia Nicholls	(Finland) Mia Eklund (Belarus) Nika Shytkouskaya	7–6^{3}, 7–5
Win	6–2	Nov 2016	GB Pro-Series Shrewsbury, UK	W10	Hard (i)	(United Kingdom) Olivia Nicholls	(United Kingdom) Alicia Barnett (United Kingdom) Lauren McMinn	6–3, 6–3
Loss	6–3	Nov 2016	ITF Heraklion, Greece	W10	Hard	(Denmark) Emilie Francati	(France) Manon Arcangioli (Greece) Despina Papamichail	4–6, 2–6
Win	7–3	Feb 2017	ITF Birmingham, UK	W15	Hard (i)	(United Kingdom) Olivia Nicholls	(Norway) Melanie Stokke (Germany) Julia Wachaczyk	6–3, 5–7, [10–7]
Loss	7–4	May 2017	ITF Hammamet, Tunisia	W15	Clay	(United Kingdom) Olivia Nicholls	(Italy) Gaia Sanesi (Italy) Martina Spigarelli	0–6, 2–6
Loss	7–5	Sep 2017	ITF Clermont-Ferrand, France	W25	Hard (i)	(United Kingdom) Olivia Nicholls	(Sweden) Cornelia Lister (Belarus) Vera Lapko	4–6, 3–6
Win	8–5	Oct 2017	Open de Touraine, France	W25	Hard (i)	(United Kingdom) Samantha Murray	(Romania) Jaqueline Cristian (Romania) Elena-Gabriela Ruse	7–6^{(3)}, 6–3
Loss	8–6	Nov 2017	ITF Sunderland, UK	W15	Hard (i)	(United Kingdom) Alicia Barnett	(Greece) Eleni Kordolaimi (United Kingdom) Maia Lumsden	6–2, 2–6, [9–11]
Win	9–6	Apr 2018	ITF Óbidos, Portugal	W25	Clay	(United Kingdom) Olivia Nicholls	(Belgium) An-Sophie Mestach (Serbia) Nina Stojanović	4–6, 7–6^{4}, [10–6]
Win	10–6	Apr 2018	ITF Óbidos, Portugal	W25	Clay	(United Kingdom) Olivia Nicholls	(France) Jessika Ponchet (Ukraine) Ganna Poznikhirenko	6–2, 6–1
Loss	10–7	May 2018	ITF Monzón, Spain	W25	Clay	(United Kingdom) Olivia Nicholls	(Spain) Cristina Bucșa (Russia) Yana Sizikova	2–6, 7–5, [8–10]
Loss	10–8	Aug 2018	ITF Chiswick, UK	W25	Hard	(United Kingdom) Olivia Nicholls	(United Kingdom) Freya Christie (United Kingdom) Samantha Murray	6–3, 5–7, [8–10]
Loss	10–9	Nov 2018	ITF Wirral, UK	W25	Hard (i)	(United Kingdom) Olivia Nicholls	(United Kingdom) Freya Christie (Russia) Valeria Savinykh	4–6, 5–7
Win	11–9	Nov 2018	GB Pro-Series Shrewsbury, UK	W25	Hard (i)	(United Kingdom) Olivia Nicholls	(Germany) Tayisiya Morderger (Germany) Yana Morderger	0–6, 6–3, [10–4]
Loss	11–10	Dec 2018	ITF Solapur, India	W25	Hard	(Russia) Ekaterina Yashina	(Japan) Miyabi Inoue (China) Lu Jiajing	3–6, 3–6
Loss	11–11	Mar 2019	Open de Seine-et-Marne, France	W60	Hard (i)	(United Kingdom) Eden Silva	(United Kingdom) Harriet Dart (Netherlands) Lesley Kerkhove	3–6, 2–6
Win	12–11	Jul 2019	ITF Palmela, Portugal	W25	Hard	(United Kingdom) Eden Silva	(France) Estelle Cascino (Bulgaria) Julia Terziyska	7–5, 6–2
Win	13–11	Aug 2019	ITF Woking, UK	W25	Hard	(United Kingdom) Eden Silva	(United Kingdom) Naiktha Bains (India) Ankita Raina	6–2, 7–5
Win	14–11	Aug 2019	ITF Chiswick, UK	W25	Hard	(Greece) Valentini Grammatikopoulou	(United Kingdom) Freya Christie (United Kingdom) Samantha Murray Sharan	6–7^{(6)}, 6–3, [10–5]
Loss	14–12	Oct 2020	ITF Cherbourg, France	W25	Hard (i)	(United Kingdom) Harriet Dart	(United States) Robin Anderson (France) Jessika Ponchet	6–4, 4–6, [8–10]
Loss	14–13	Oct 2020	ITF Reims, France	W25	Hard (i)	(United Kingdom) Harriet Dart	(France) Séléna Janicijevic (United States) Robin Montgomery	w/o
Loss	14–14	May 2021	ITF Monastir, Tunisia	W15	Hard	(United States) Dasha Ivanova	(Kazakhstan) Gozal Ainitdinova (Belarus) Anna Kubareva	5–7, 2–6
Loss	14–15	Jul 2021	Open de Biarritz, France	W60	Clay	(Belgium) Magali Kempen	(Russia) Oksana Selekhmeteva (Latvia) Daniela Vismane	3–6, 6–7^{(5)}
Win	15–15	Aug 2021	Zubr Cup, Czech Republic	W60	Clay	(Brazil) Carolina Alves	(Japan) Mana Kawamura (Japan) Funa Kozaki	6–4, 3–6, [13–11]
Loss	15–16	Oct 2021	ITF Le Neubourg, France	W80+H	Hard	(France) Estelle Cascino	(United States) Robin Anderson (France) Amandine Hesse	3–6, 6–7^{(2)}
Win	16–16	Oct 2021	ITF Cherbourg, France	W25+H	Hard (i)	(Netherlands) Arianne Hartono	(France) Estelle Cascino (Italy) Camilla Rosatello	6–3, 6–2
Loss	16–17	Jul 2022	ITF Guimarães, Portugal	W25	Hard	(United States) Jamie Loeb	(Portugal) Francisca Jorge (Portugal) Matilde Jorge	3–6, 1–6
Loss	16–18	Sep 2022	ITF Le Neubourg, France	W80+H	Hard	(Poland) Weronika Falkowska	(United Kingdom) Freya Christie (United Kingdom) Ali Collins	6–1, 6–7^{(4)}, [3–10]
Win	17–18	Jul 2023	ITF Roehampton, UK	W25	Hard	(India) Rutuja Bhosale	(United Kingdom) Madeleine Brooks (United Kingdom) Holly Hutchinson	0–6, 6–4, [10–4]
Win	18–18	Aug 2023	ITF Aldershot, UK	W25	Hard	(Australia) Destanee Aiava	(Japan) Erina Hayashi (Japan) Saki Imamura	6–4, 6–3
Win	19–18	Aug 2023	ITF Vigo, Spain	W25	Hard	(Bosnia and Herzegovina) Nefisa Berberović	(Italy) Anastasia Abbagnato (Lithuania) Patricija Paukštytė	6–3, 4–6, [11–9]
Win	20–18	Aug 2023	ITF Valladolid, Spain	W25	Hard	(Australia) Alexandra Bozovic	(United States) Ava Markham (China) Tian Fangran	7–5, 6–0
Win	21–18	Nov 2023	Calgary Challenger, Canada	W60+H	Hard (i)	(United Kingdom) Eden Silva	(United States) Hanna Chang (Serbia) Katarina Jokić	6–4, 6–4
Loss	21–19	Jan 2024	GB Pro-Series Loughborough, UK	W35	Hard (i)	(United Kingdom) Alicia Barnett	(United States) Liv Hovde (United Kingdom) Ella McDonald	6–4, 2–6, [7–10]
Win	22–19	Jan 2024	Porto Indoor, Portugal	W75+H	Hard (i)	(United Kingdom) Olivia Nicholls	(Portugal) Francisca Jorge (Portugal) Matilde Jorge	4–6, 6–3, [10–6]
Loss	22–20	Feb 2024	Open de l'Isère, France	W75	Hard (i)	(United Kingdom) Eden Silva	(United Kingdom) Emily Appleton (United Kingdom) Freya Christie	6–3, 1–6, [9–11]
Loss	22–21	Apr 2024	ITF Calvi, France	W50+H	Hard	(France) Amandine Hesse	(Poland) Urszula Radwańska (Switzerland) Valentina Ryser	3–6, 2–6
Win	23–21	May 2024	Kurume Cup, Japan	W75	Carpet	(United Kingdom) Madeleine Brooks	(Japan) Momoko Kobori (Japan) Ayano Shimizu	6–4, 6–0
Loss	23–22	Jun 2024	Surbiton Trophy, UK	W100	Grass	(United Kingdom) Tara Moore	(United States) Emina Bektas (Serbia) Aleksandra Krunić	1–6, 1–6
Loss	23–23	Jul 2024	Figueira da Foz Open, Portugal	W100	Hard	(United Kingdom) Madeleine Brooks	(Japan) Sayaka Ishii (Japan) Naho Sato	6–7^{(1)}, 5–7
Win	24–23	Sep 2024	ITF Leiria, Portugal	W35	Hard	(Portugal) Matilde Jorge	(Canada) Bianca Fernandez (Slovakia) Radka Zelníčková	7–6^{(1)}, 6–2
Loss	24–24	Sep 2024	ITF Santarém, Portugal	W35	Hard	(Slovakia) Katarína Kužmová	Anastasiia Gureva (Slovakia) Radka Zelníčková	5–7, 1–6
Win	25–24	Sep 2024	ITF Reims, France	W35	Hard (i)	(United Kingdom) Mimi Xu	Ekaterina Ovcharenko (United Kingdom) Emily Webley-Smith	6–3, 6–1
Win	26–24	Oct 2024	Open de Touraine, France	W35	Hard (i)	(Switzerland) Leonie Küng	(Ukraine) Anastasiia Firman (Switzerland) Chelsea Fontenel	6–4, 6–2
