= Alina Korneeva =

Russian tennis player (born 2007)

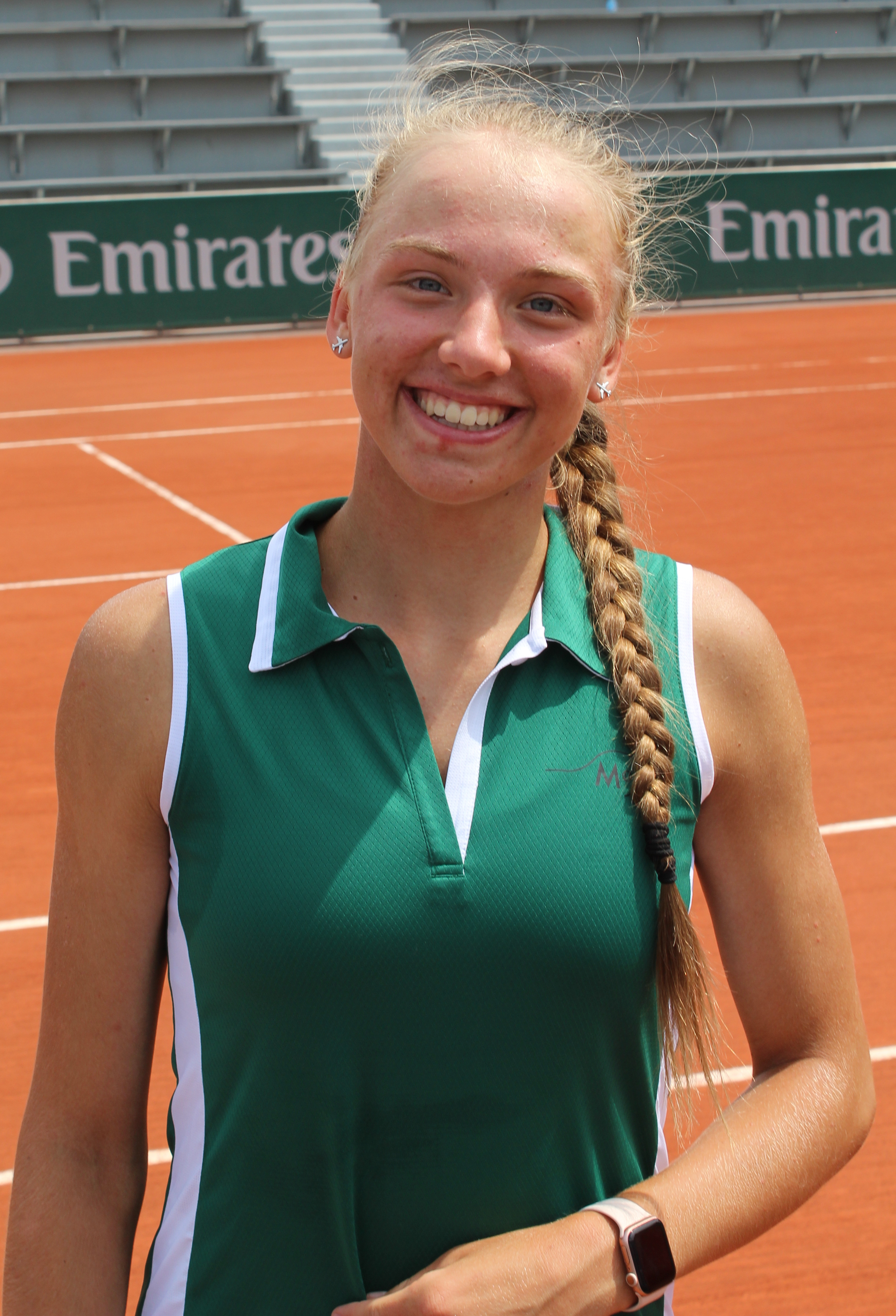
- Korneeva at the 2023 French Open
- Full name: Alina Aleksandrovna Korneeva
- Country (sports): Russia
- Residence: Mallorca, Spain
- Born: 23 June 2007 (age 19) Moscow, Russia
- Height: 1.80 m (5 ft 11 in)
- Turned pro: 2021
- Plays: Right (two-handed backhand)
- Coach: Anabel Medina Garrigues
- Prize money: $975,861

Singles
- Career record: 143–52
- Career titles: 1 WTA 125
- Highest ranking: No. 67 (24 August 2026)
- Current ranking: No. 80 (19 October 2026)

Grand Slam singles results
- Australian Open: 2R (2024)
- French Open: 2R (2026)
- Wimbledon: 1R (2026)
- US Open: 1R (2026)

Doubles
- Career record: 34–23
- Career titles: 2 ITF
- Highest ranking: No. 223 (18 August 2025)
- Current ranking: No. 294 (12 October 2026)

Grand Slam doubles results
- US Open: 1R (2026)
- Last updated on: 12 October 2026.

Alina Aleksandrovna Korneeva (Russian: Алина Александровна Корнеева, born 23 June 2007) is a Russian professional tennis player. She has a career-high WTA singles ranking of world No. 67, achieved on 24 August 2026 and a best doubles ranking of No. 223, reached on 18 August 2025.

In 2023, Korneeva won two girls' singles major titles, at the Australian Open and the French Open, and reached world No. 1 in the ITF junior combined ranking.

== Career ==
=== 2021–22: First junior events ===
Korneeva finished runner-up at the under-14 girls European Junior Championships to Czech player Tereza Valentová.

On the ITF Junior Circuit, in 2022 Korneeva's tally of six singles titles saw her claim the most singles titles in girls’ tennis that year. Korneeva won her first $15k event in Casablanca in September, defeating Laura Hietaranta in the final.

=== 2023: No. 1 junior, WTA Tour debut ===
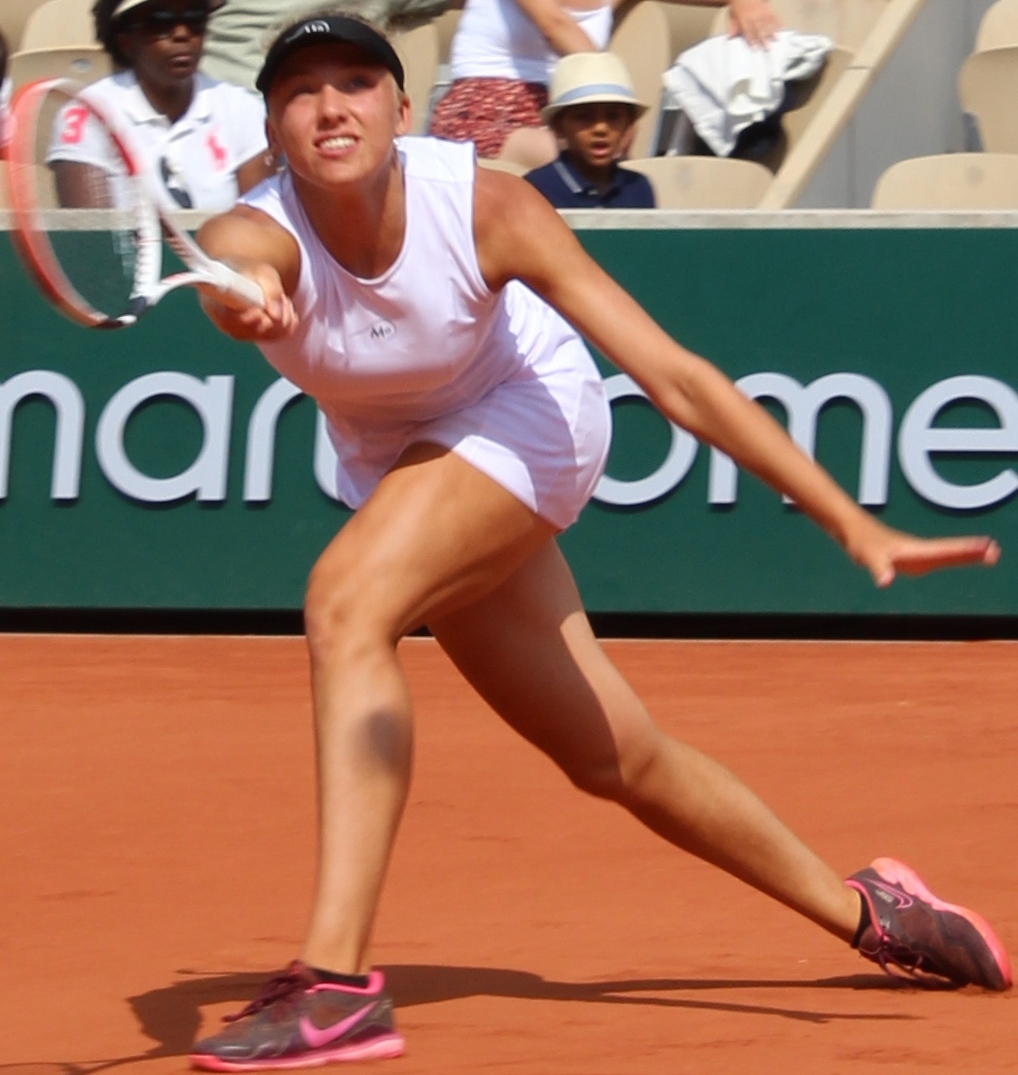
Korneeva at the 2023 Junior French Open

Korneeva had success in her junior major debut at the Australian Open, reaching the semifinals of the girls' doubles with partner Mirra Andreeva, and defeating Andreeva in three sets in the final of the girls' singles. Before their final Andreeva said, "she is a really good friend of mine, my best friend." After the match, Korneeva told her on court, "It's not our last battle. We will have a lot of good matches when you will win, when I will win...it was a hard battle." In the quarterfinals of the girls singles, Korneeva defeated second seed Tereza Valentová, who 18 months prior, had defeated Korneeva in the under-14 girls singles final at the European Junior Championships.

In March, Korneeva qualified for the main draw of the W60 event in Pretoria and won the tournament, defeating Tímea Babos in the final, in straight sets. At age 15 years, eight months and 18 days, Korneeva became the fifth youngest player in history to win a tournament at 60k-level or above.

On 1 May, Korneeva became No. 1 in the junior world rankings.

In June, she won her second junior Grand Slam title, defeating Lucciana Pérez in the final of the French Open, in straight sets, becoming the first player since Magdalena Maleeva in 1990 to win the first two Grand Slam tournaments in girls' singles in the same year. Together with Sara Saito, Korneeva also reached the final of the girls' doubles, losing to Tyra Caterina Grant and Iva Jovic.

In July, Korneeva qualified for the main draw and won the W100 Figueira da Foz Open, defeating French player Carole Monnet in the final 6–0, 6–0, and becoming the youngest player to win a W100 title. Together with Anastasia Tikhonova, she also reached the final of the same event in doubles.

In October, she qualified for the Hong Kong Open making her WTA Tour debut, and defeated fellow Russian Valeria Savinykh for her first tour match win. She lost to Linda Fruhvirtová in the second round.

On 22 October, Korneeva won the 2023 ITF World Tour Junior Finals, defeating Sara Saito in the Championship match.

=== 2024: Major debut and first win, WTA Tour doubles final ===
In the last round of qualifying at the Australian Open, Korneeva defeated Anna Bondár in straight sets to qualify for the main draw, making her major debut. She defeated Sara Sorribes Tormo in the first round, before losing in the second to tenth-seed Beatriz Haddad Maia.

At the Jasmin Open, Korneeva reached her first career final in doubles, partnering Anastasia Zakharova. They lost to Anna Blinkova and Mayar Sherif, in three sets.

Partnering Polina Kudermetova, she ended runner-up at the WTA 125 Abierto Tampico, losing the final to Carmen Corley and Rebecca Marino.

Korneeva reached her first WTA Tour singles semifinal at the Mérida Open with wins over Alycia Parks, fifth seed Anna Blinkova and Sara Sorribes Tormo. She lost in the last four to Zeynep Sönmez.

=== 2025: Three ITF Tour titles ===
In July, Korneeva reached the final of the W100 Figueira da Foz Open which she lost to Maria Timofeeva. Nonetheless, she re-entered top 200 in the WTA rankings. She then won the titles of the Leira and Evora W50 tournaments in Portugal back-to-back in September to reach world No. 156. Korneeva also won the title of the W75 Slovak Open, defeating Lucie Havlíčková in the final.

She then qualified for the main draw of the Guangzhou Open, before losing to sixth seed Yulia Putintseva in the first round.

=== 2026: First WTA 125 title, Wimbledon debut and WTA 1000 breakthrough ===
Korneeva started the year winning the title at the W75 event in Manama, Bahrain beating Fiona Ferro in the final, in straight sets.

In February 2026, Korneeva won her first WTA 125 title at the Oeiras Indoors defeating Darja Vidmanova in the final. She defeated Lilli Tagger to qualify for the Italian Open for her first WTA 1000 at Rome. Korneeva secured her spot in the main draw at the 2026 French Open for the first time when she defeated Julia Riera in straight sets, in the final round of qualifying on 21 May 2026. She registered her second major win in the first round beating Elisabetta Cocciaretto, in straight sets. She lost to compatriot Anna Kalinskaya in the next round but climbed 21 spots after this performance, making her top-100 debut at No. 96, on 8 June 2026. She defeated Fiona Crawley in straight sets to make her debut at Wimbledon.

In July, Korneeva reached the semifinals of the inaugural Athens Open, her second Tour-level semifinal. She defeated Aoi Ito , second seed Ann Li and Tereza Valentova, before losing to fourth seed Maria Sakkari, 1–6, 5–7. The run lifted her to a new career-high ranking of world No. 75 on 20 July.

At the Canadian Open in Toronto in August, Korneeva came through qualifying and reached the fourth round of a WTA 1000 tournament for the first time. She defeated 23rd seed Emma Navarro 6–2, 6–2 in the second round for her first top-30 win, then defeated 13th seed Iva Jovic in two sets for her first top-20 victory. Korneeva advanced to the round of 16, before losing to fourth seed Coco Gauff, in straight sets.

== Personal background ==
Born in Moscow, her father, Aleksandr Korneev, is a former volleyball player who won a bronze medal at the 2008 Summer Olympics. Korneeva has been nicknamed the "mini Sharapova" in some quarters.

== Performance timeline ==
Key
W	F	SF	QF	#R	RR	Q#	P#	DNQ	A	Z#	PO	G	S	B	NMS	NTI	P	NH

(W) winner; (F) finalist; (SF) semifinalist; (QF) quarterfinalist; (#R) rounds 4, 3, 2, 1; (RR) round-robin stage; (Q#) qualification round; (P#) preliminary round; (DNQ) did not qualify; (A) absent; (Z#) Davis/Fed Cup Zonal Group (with number indication) or (PO) play-off; (G) gold, (S) silver or (B) bronze Olympic/Paralympic medal; (NMS) not a Masters tournament; (NTI) not a Tier I tournament; (P) postponed; (NH) not held; (SR) strike rate (events won / competed); (W–L) win–loss record.
To avoid confusion and double counting, these charts are updated at the conclusion of a tournament or when the player's participation has ended.

Only main-draw results in WTA Tour, Grand Slam tournaments, Fed Cup/Billie Jean King Cup and Olympic Games are included in win–loss records.

=== Singles ===
Current through 2026 US Open.

Tournament	2024	2025	2026	SR	W–L	Win %
Grand Slam tournaments
Australian Open	2R	Q1	Q1	0 / 1	1–1	50%
French Open	A	A	2R	0 / 1	1–1	50%
Wimbledon	A	Q1	1R	0 / 1	0–1	0%
US Open	A	Q1	1R	0 / 1	0–1	–
Win–Loss	1–1	0–0	1–3	0 / 4	2–4	33%
WTA 1000 tournaments
Italian Open	A	A	1R	0 / 1	0–1	0%
Canadian Open	A	A	4R	0 / 1	3–1	75%
Cincinnati Open	A	A	Q2	0 / 0	0–0	–
Win–Loss	0–0	0–0	3–2	0 / 2	3–2	60%

== WTA Tour finals ==
=== Doubles: 1 (runner-up) ===
Legend WTA 250 (0–1)	Finals by surface Hard (0–1)	Finals by setting Outdoor (0–1)

Result	Date	Tournament	Tier	Surface	Partner	Opponents	Score
Loss	Sep 2024	Jasmin Open, Tunisia	WTA 250	Hard	Anastasia Zakharova	Anna Blinkova (Egypt) Mayar Sherif	6–2, 1–6, [8–10]

== WTA 125 finals ==
=== Singles: 1 (title) ===
Result	W–L	Date	Tournament	Surface	Opponent	Score
Win	1–0	Feb 2026	Oeiras Indoors, Portugal	Hard (i)	(Czech Republic) Darja Viďmanová	7–5, 6–1

=== Doubles: 1 (runner-up) ===
Result	W–L	Date	Tournament	Surface	Partner	Opponents	Score
Loss	0–1	Oct 2024	Abierto Tampico, Mexico	Hard	Polina Kudermetova	(United States) Carmen Corley (Canada) Rebecca Marino	3–6, 3–6

== ITF Circuit finals ==
=== Singles: 10 (8 titles, 2 runner-ups) ===
Legend W100 tournaments (2–1) W80 tournaments (0–1) W60/75 tournaments (3–0) W50 tournaments (2–0) W15 tournaments (1–0)	Finals by surface Hard (7–2) Clay (1–0)

Result	W–L	Date	Tournament	Tier	Surface	Opponent	Score
Win	1–0	Sep 2022	ITF Casablanca, Morocco	W15	Clay	(Finland) Laura Hietaranta	7–5, 6–4
Win	2–0	Mar 2023	ITF Pretoria, South Africa	W60	Hard	(Hungary) Tímea Babos	6–3, 7–6^{(3)}
Win	3–0	Jul 2023	Figueira da Foz Open, Portugal	W100	Hard	(France) Carole Monnet	6–0, 6–0
Loss	3–1	Sep 2023	ITF Le Neubourg, France	W80	Hard	(Switzerland) Céline Naef	6–4, 2–6, 6–7^{(7)}
Win	4–1	Sep 2024	Caldas da Rainha Open, Portugal	W100	Hard	Anastasia Zakharova	6–1, 6–4
Loss	4–2	Jul 2025	Figueira da Foz Open, Portugal	W100	Hard	Maria Timofeeva	3–6, 0–6
Win	5–2	Sep 2025	ITF Leiria, Portugal	W50	Hard	(Czech Republic) Linda Fruhvirtová	6–1, 7–5
Win	6–2	Sep 2025	ITF Évora, Portugal	W50	Hard	(Spain) Kaitlin Quevedo	6–3, 6–1
Win	7–2	Sep 2025	Bratislava Open, Slovakia	W75	Hard (i)	(Czech Republic) Lucie Havlíčková	7–6^{(7)}, 7–5
Win	8–2	Jan 2026	ITF Manama, Bahrain	W75	Hard	(France) Fiona Ferro	6–4, 6–0

=== Doubles: 3 (2 titles, 1 runner-up) ===
Legend W100 tournaments (0–1) W80 tournaments (1–0) W25 tournaments (1–0)	Finals by surface Hard (2–1)

Result	W–L	Date	Tournament	Tier	Surface	Partner	Opponents	Score
Win	1–0	Nov 2022	ITF Sharm El Sheikh, Egypt	W25	Hard	Polina Iatcenko	(Switzerland) Jenny Dürst (South Korea) Park So-hyun	6–1, 6–7^{(1)}, [10–5]
Loss	1–1	Jul 2023	Figueira da Foz Open, Portugal	W100	Hard	Anastasia Tikhonova	(Hong Kong) Eudice Chong (Netherlands) Arianne Hartono	3–6, 2–6
Win	2–1	Sep 2023	ITF Le Neubourg, France	W80	Hard	(France) Fiona Ferro	(Ukraine) Maryna Kolb (Ukraine) Nadiya Kolb	7–6^{(7)}, 7–5

== Junior Grand Slam tournament finals ==
=== Singles: 2 (2 titles) ===
Result	Year	Tournament	Surface	Opponent	Score
Win	2023	Australian Open	Hard	Mirra Andreeva	6–7^{(2)}, 6–4, 7–5
Win	2023	French Open	Clay	(Peru) Lucciana Pérez	7–6^{(4)}, 6–3

=== Doubles: 1 (runner-up) ===
Result	Year	Tournament	Surface	Partner	Opponents	Score
Loss	2023	French Open	Clay	(Japan) Sara Saito	(United States) Tyra Caterina Grant (United States) Clervie Ngounoue	3–6, 2–6
