= 2021 Portugal Ladies Open – Doubles =

Doubles
- 2021 Portugal Ladies Open

Final
- Champions: (Japan) Momoko Kobori (Japan) Hiroko Kuwata
- Runners-up: (United Kingdom) Alicia Barnett (United Kingdom) Olivia Nicholls
- Score: 7–6^{(7–5)}, 7–6^{(7–2)}

Events
Singles	Doubles
← 2019 ·	Portugal Ladies Open	· 2022 →

Jessika Ponchet and Isabella Shinikova were the defending champions but Shinikova chose to compete at the 2021 BGL Luxembourg Open instead. Ponchet partnered alongside Eden Silva, but lost in the semifinals to Momoko Kobori and Hiroko Kuwata.

Kobori and Kuwata went on to win the title, defeating Alicia Barnett and Olivia Nicholls in the final, 7–6^{(7–5)}, 7–6^{(7–2)}.

== Seeds ==
1. (France) Jessika Ponchet / (United Kingdom) Eden Silva (semifinals)
2. (France) Amandine Hesse / (Germany) Tatjana Maria (quarterfinals)
3. (Australia) Olivia Gadecki / (Australia) Maddison Inglis (first round)
4. (Belgium) Marie Benoît / (Romania) Ioana Loredana Roșca (quarterfinals)

== Draw ==
=== Key ===
- Q = Qualifier
- WC = Wild card
- LL = Lucky loser
- Alt = Alternate
- SE = Special exempt
- PR = Protected ranking
- ITF = ITF entry
- JE = Junior exempt
- w/o = Walkover
- r = Retired
- d = Defaulted
- SR = Special ranking

=== Draw ===
First round
1	(France) J Ponchet (United Kingdom) E Silva	6	6
WC	(Portugal) CC Reis (Russia) E Shalimova	1	4
WC	(Portugal) I Murta (Germany) S-R Sekulic	3	6	[4]
WC	(Portugal) M Jorge (Spain) V Koussenkova	6	2	[10]
3	(Australia) O Gadecki (Australia) M Inglis	6^{3}	1
(Brazil) C Alves (France) C Monnet	7^{7}	6
(Poland) W Falkowska (Russia) A Tikhonova	4	7	[9]
(Japan) M Kobori (Japan) H Kuwata	6	5	[11]
(United Kingdom) A Barnett (United Kingdom) O Nicholls	6	6
(United States) R Anderson (Romania) E Bogdan	2	1
(Japan) K Okamura (Serbia) N Stevanović	4	2
4	(Belgium) M Benoît (Romania) IL Roșca	6	6
(Spain) C Cerviño Ruiz (Italy) A Moratelli	6	6^{3}	[7]
(Portugal) F Jorge (Spain) O Parres Azcoitia	3	7^{7}	[10]
(Romania) K Bejenaru (Cyprus) R Șerban	3	6	[2]
2	(France) A Hesse (Germany) T Maria	6	1	[10]

Quarterfinals
1	(France) J Ponchet (United Kingdom) E Silva	6	6
WC	(Portugal) M Jorge (Spain) V Koussenkova	2	1
(Brazil) C Alves (France) C Monnet	6^{1}	6^{5}
(Japan) M Kobori (Japan) H Kuwata	7^{7}	7^{7}
(United Kingdom) A Barnett (United Kingdom) O Nicholls	6	6
4	(Belgium) M Benoît (Romania) IL Roșca	1	4
(Portugal) F Jorge (Spain) O Parres Azcoitia	2	7^{7}	[10]
2	(France) A Hesse (Germany) T Maria	6	6^{2}	[7]

Semifinals
1	(France) J Ponchet (United Kingdom) E Silva	1	2
(Japan) M Kobori (Japan) H Kuwata	6	6
(United Kingdom) A Barnett (United Kingdom) O Nicholls	6	7^{11}
(Portugal) F Jorge (Spain) O Parres Azcoitia	3	6^{9}

Final
(Japan) M Kobori (Japan) H Kuwata	7^{7}	7^{7}
(United Kingdom) A Barnett (United Kingdom) O Nicholls	6^{5}	6^{2}
