= 2021 Portugal Ladies Open – Singles =

Singles
- 2021 Portugal Ladies Open

Final
- Champion: (China) Zheng Saisai
- Runner-up: (France) Harmony Tan
- Score: 6–4, 3–6, 6–3

Events
Singles	Doubles
← 2019 ·	Portugal Ladies Open	· 2022 →

Isabella Shinikova was the defending champion but chose to compete at the 2021 BGL Luxembourg Open instead.

Zheng Saisai won the title, defeating Harmony Tan in the final, 6–4, 3–6, 6–3.

== Seeds ==
1. (China) Zheng Saisai
2. (China) Wang Xinyu (quarterfinals)
3. (France) Harmony Tan (final)
4. (Australia) Maddison Inglis (semifinals)
5. (Australia) Arina Rodionova (first round)
6. (Australia) Lizette Cabrera (first round)
7. (Brazil) Beatriz Haddad Maia (semifinals)
8. (Ukraine) Daria Snigur (first round)

== Draw ==
=== Key ===
- Q = Qualifier
- WC = Wild card
- LL = Lucky loser
- Alt = Alternate
- SE = Special exempt
- PR = Protected ranking
- ITF = ITF entry
- JE = Junior exempt
- w/o = Walkover
- r = Retired
- d = Defaulted
- SR = Special ranking

=== Finals ===
Semifinals
1	(China) Zheng Saisai	6	6
4	(Australia) Maddison Inglis	2	3
3	(France) Harmony Tan	7^{7}	7^{7}
7	(Brazil) Beatriz Haddad Maia	6^{5}	6^{4}

Final
1	(China) Zheng Saisai	6	3	6
3	(France) Harmony Tan	4	6	3

=== Top half ===
First round
1	(China) S Zheng	6	6
(Japan) K Okamura	2	1
(France) A Hesse	6	6
(France) C Monnet	1	4
(Belgium) M Benoît	6	6
WC	(Portugal) S Lança	2	0
Q	(Romania) IL Roșca	4	6	7^{7}
6	(Australia) L Cabrera	6	3	6^{4}
4	(Australia) M Inglis	3	7	6
Q	(Poland) W Falkowska	6	5	3
(United States) R Anderson	7^{7}	3	5
(Serbia) N Stevanović	6^{3}	6	7
Q	(Australia) O Gadecki	4	6	6
WC	(Italy) D Spiteri	6	1	1
SE	(Finland) A Kulikova	6	6
5	(Australia) Ar Rodionova	0	4

Second round
1	(China) S Zheng	2	7	7
(France) A Hesse	6	5	5
(Belgium) M Benoît	4	6	6
Q	(Romania) IL Roșca	6	4	4
4	(Australia) M Inglis	6	6
(Serbia) N Stevanović	2	1
Q	(Australia) O Gadecki	6	4	4
SE	(Finland) A Kulikova	2	6	6

Quarterfinals
1	(China) S Zheng	6	6
(Belgium) M Benoît	3	1
4	(Australia) M Inglis	6	4	6
SE	(Finland) A Kulikova	2	6	3

Semifinals
1	(China) S Zheng	6	6
4	(Australia) M Inglis	2	3

=== Bottom half ===
First round
8/JE	(Ukraine) D Snigur	3	4
(France) J Ponchet	6	6
WC	(Portugal) I Murta	3	3
Q	(Cyprus) R Șerban	6	6
WC	(Portugal) F Jorge	6	6^{6}	6
(Brazil) C Alves	2	7^{8}	2
Q	(France) S Djoubri	3	3
3	(France) H Tan	6	6
7	(Brazil) B Haddad Maia	6	6
Q	(United Kingdom) E Silva	0	1
(Australia) E Perez	6	6
Q	(Germany) S-R Sekulic	2	2
(Germany) T Maria	6	6
Q	(Romania) E Bogdan	2	4
(Russia) A Tikhonova	3	5
2	(China) Xin Wang	6	7

Second round
(France) J Ponchet	5	4
Q	(Cyprus) R Șerban	7	6
WC	(Portugal) F Jorge	2	2
3	(France) H Tan	6	6
7	(Brazil) B Haddad Maia	6	6
(Australia) E Perez	4	4
(Germany) T Maria	2	1
2	(China) Xin Wang	6	6

Quarterfinals
Q	(Cyprus) R Șerban	6^{4}	5
3	(France) H Tan	7^{7}	7
7	(Brazil) B Haddad Maia	6	6
2	(China) Xin Wang	3	4

Semifinals
3	(France) H Tan	7^{7}	7^{7}
7	(Brazil) B Haddad Maia	6^{5}	6^{4}
