= 2021 Portugal Ladies Open =

Tennis tournament

- Date: 13–19 September 2021
- Edition: 2nd
- Category: ITF Women's World Tennis Tour
- Prize money: $60,000+H
- Surface: Hard
- Location: Caldas da Rainha, Portugal

Champions

Singles
- (China) Zheng Saisai

Doubles
- (Japan) Momoko Kobori / (Japan) Hiroko Kuwata
← 2019 ·	Portugal Ladies Open	· 2022 →

The 2021 Portugal Ladies Open was a professional women's tennis tournament played on outdoor hard courts. It was the second edition of the tournament which was part of the 2021 ITF Women's World Tennis Tour. It took place in Caldas da Rainha, Portugal between 13 and 19 September 2021.

== Singles main-draw entrants ==
=== Seeds ===
Country	Player	Rank^{1}	Seed
CHN	Zheng Saisai	83	1
CHN	Wang Xinyu	135	2
FRA	Harmony Tan	138	3
AUS	Maddison Inglis	144	4
AUS	Arina Rodionova	157	5
AUS	Lizette Cabrera	159	6
BRA	Beatriz Haddad Maia	174	7
UKR	Daria Snigur	207	8

- ^{1} Rankings are as of 30 August 2021.

=== Other entrants ===
The following players received wildcards into the singles main draw:

- (Portugal) Francisca Jorge
- (Portugal) Inês Murta
- (Portugal) Sara Lança
- (Italy) Dalila Spiteri

The following player received entry using a junior exempt:

- (Ukraine) Daria Snigur

The following player received entry using a special exempt:

- (Finland) Anastasia Kulikova

The following players received entry from the qualifying draw:

- (Romania) Elena Bogdan
- (France) Salma Djoubri
- (Poland) Weronika Falkowska
- (Australia) Olivia Gadecki
- (Romania) Ioana Loredana Roșca
- (Germany) Sarah-Rebecca Sekulic
- (Cyprus) Raluca Șerban
- (United Kingdom) Eden Silva

== Champions ==
=== Singles ===
- (China) Zheng Saisai def. (France) Harmony Tan, 6–4, 3–6, 6–3

=== Doubles ===
- (Japan) Momoko Kobori / (Japan) Hiroko Kuwata def. (United Kingdom) Alicia Barnett / (United Kingdom) Olivia Nicholls, 7–6^{(7–5)}, 7–6^{(7–2)}
