= 2019 Oeste Ladies Open – Doubles =

Doubles
- 2019 Oeste Ladies Open

Final
- Champions: (France) Jessika Ponchet (Bulgaria) Isabella Shinikova
- Runners-up: (Kazakhstan) Anna Danilina (Germany) Vivian Heisen
- Score: 6–1, 6–3

Events
Singles	Doubles
Oeste Ladies Open	· 2021 →

This was the first edition of the tournament.

Jessika Ponchet and Isabella Shinikova won the title, defeating Anna Danilina and Vivian Heisen in the final, 6–1, 6–3.

== Seeds ==
1. (United Kingdom) Sarah Beth Grey / (United Kingdom) Eden Silva (semifinals)
2. (Spain) Cristina Bucșa / (Spain) Georgina García Pérez (semifinals)
3. (Kazakhstan) Anna Danilina / (Germany) Vivian Heisen (final)
4. (Serbia) Natalija Kostić / (Brazil) Laura Pigossi (quarterfinals, retired)

== Draw ==
=== Key ===
- Q = Qualifier
- WC = Wild card
- LL = Lucky loser
- Alt = Alternate
- SE = Special exempt
- PR = Protected ranking
- ITF = ITF entry
- JE = Junior exempt
- w/o = Walkover
- r = Retired
- d = Defaulted
- SR = Special ranking

=== Draw ===
First round
(Portugal) S Lança (Russia) E Shalimova	6	6
(Ukraine) E Hamaliy (Spain) V Koussenkova	4	1
4	(Serbia) N Kostić (Brazil) L Pigossi	6	6
(Portugal) AF Santos (Spain) A Sanz-Llaneza Fernández	2	3
(France) J Ponchet (Bulgaria) I Shinikova	7	4	[10]
(Argentina) V Bosio (Portugal) MI Fonte	5	6	[4]
(Italy) V Meliss (Czech Republic) L Pulchartová	3	5
(Portugal) F Jorge (Spain) O Parres Azcoitia	6	7
(Germany) K Hobgarski (Romania) LI Paar	6	3	[5]
3	(Kazakhstan) A Danilina (Germany) V Heisen	2	6	[10]
(Belarus) Y Hatouka (Latvia) D Marcinkēviča	5	6	[10]
(Switzerland) K Kennel (Portugal) I Murta	7	4	[7]
(Greece) V Grammatikopoulou (Switzerland) Y In-Albon	7	3	[6]
2	(Spain) C Bucșa (Spain) G García Pérez	5	6	[10]

Quarterfinals
1	(United Kingdom) SB Grey (United Kingdom) E Silva	6	6
(Portugal) S Lança (Russia) E Shalimova	3	1
4	(Serbia) N Kostić (Brazil) L Pigossi	4	0^{r}
(France) J Ponchet (Bulgaria) I Shinikova	6	3
(Portugal) F Jorge (Spain) O Parres Azcoitia	2	6^{3}
3	(Kazakhstan) A Danilina (Germany) V Heisen	6	7^{7}
(Belarus) Y Hatouka (Latvia) D Marcinkēviča	0	2
2	(Spain) C Bucșa (Spain) G García Pérez	6	6

Semifinals
1	(United Kingdom) SB Grey (United Kingdom) E Silva	6^{4}	6^{6}
(France) J Ponchet (Bulgaria) I Shinikova	7^{7}	7^{8}
3	(Kazakhstan) A Danilina (Germany) V Heisen	6	6
2	(Spain) C Bucșa (Spain) G García Pérez	1	1

Final
(France) J Ponchet (Bulgaria) I Shinikova	6	6
3	(Kazakhstan) A Danilina (Germany) V Heisen	1	3
