= 2019 Oeste Ladies Open – Singles =

Singles
- 2019 Oeste Ladies Open

Final
- Champion: (Bulgaria) Isabella Shinikova
- Runner-up: (Serbia) Natalija Kostić
- Score: 6–3, 2–0, ret.

Events
Singles	Doubles
Oeste Ladies Open	· 2021 →

This was the first edition of the tournament.

Isabella Shinikova won the title after Natalija Kostić retired in the final at 6–3, 2–0.

== Seeds ==
1. (Estonia) Kaia Kanepi (quarterfinals)
2. (Italy) Giulia Gatto-Monticone (first round)
3. (Bulgaria) Viktoriya Tomova (quarterfinals)
4. (Turkey) Pemra Özgen (second round)
5. (Germany) Katharina Hobgarski (second round)
6. (Latvia) Diāna Marcinkēviča (first round)
7. (France) Jessika Ponchet (semifinals)
8. (Bulgaria) Elitsa Kostova (first round)

== Draw ==
=== Key ===
- Q = Qualifier
- WC = Wild card
- LL = Lucky loser
- Alt = Alternate
- SE = Special exempt
- PR = Protected ranking
- ITF = ITF entry
- JE = Junior exempt
- w/o = Walkover
- r = Retired
- d = Defaulted
- SR = Special ranking

=== Finals ===
Semifinals
(Bulgaria) Isabella Shinikova	7^{7}	5	6
7	(France) Jessika Ponchet	6^{1}	7	2
(Serbia) Natalija Kostić	7	2	6
(Spain) Cristina Bucșa	5	6	3

Final
(Bulgaria) Isabella Shinikova	6	2
(Serbia) Natalija Kostić	3	0^{r}

=== Top half ===
First round
1	(Estonia) K Kanepi	7	6
(Greece) V Grammatikopoulou	5	1
LL	(Spain) O Parres Azcoitia	4	6	4
WC	(Portugal) I Murta	6	2	6
(France) A Hesse	6	6
(Germany) V Heisen	4	0
(Bulgaria) I Shinikova	6	6^{2}	6
6	(Latvia) D Marcinkēviča	4	7^{7}	4
3	(Bulgaria) V Tomova	3	6	6
(Kazakhstan) A Danilina	6	1	2
Q	(Czech Republic) L Pulchartová	0	0
Q	(United Kingdom) SB Grey	6	6
Q	(Switzerland) K Kennel	1	6	6
WC	(Portugal) F Jorge	6	4	2
(Romania) LI Paar	1	4
7	(France) J Ponchet	6	6

Second round
1	(Estonia) K Kanepi	6	6
WC	(Portugal) I Murta	2	0
(France) A Hesse	5	4
(Bulgaria) I Shinikova	7	6
3	(Bulgaria) V Tomova	7	6
Q	(United Kingdom) SB Grey	5	4
Q	(Switzerland) K Kennel	5	0
7	(France) J Ponchet	7	6

Quarterfinals
1	(Estonia) K Kanepi	6^{10}	6	3
(Bulgaria) I Shinikova	7^{12}	3	6
3	(Bulgaria) V Tomova	3	6	6^{3}
7	(France) J Ponchet	6	3	7^{7}

Semifinals
(Bulgaria) I Shinikova	7^{7}	5	6
7	(France) J Ponchet	6^{1}	7	2

=== Bottom half ===
First round
5	(Germany) K Hobgarski	6	6
Q	(Argentina) V Bosio	2	2
Q	(Russia) E Shalimova	1	4
(Serbia) N Kostić	6	6
Q	(Italy) V Meliss	0	5
(Spain) G García Pérez	6	7
Q	(United Kingdom) E Silva	1	1
4	(Turkey) P Özgen	6	6
8	(Bulgaria) E Kostova	4	2
(Switzerland) Y In-Albon	6	6
WC	(Portugal) MI Fonte	4	3
Q	(Spain) A Atucha Gómez	6	6
WC	(Brazil) L Pigossi	6	6
(Belarus) Y Hatouka	2	2
(Spain) C Bucșa	6	6
2	(Italy) G Gatto-Monticone	4	2

Second round
5	(Germany) K Hobgarski	4	2
(Serbia) N Kostić	6	6
(Spain) G García Pérez	5	6	6
4	(Turkey) P Özgen	7	3	4
(Switzerland) Y In-Albon	2	7^{7}	6
Q	(Spain) A Atucha Gómez	6	6^{3}	4
WC	(Brazil) L Pigossi	6	2	4
(Spain) C Bucșa	3	6	6

Quarterfinals
(Serbia) N Kostić	6	7
(Spain) G García Pérez	1	5
(Switzerland) Y In-Albon	7	2	3
(Spain) C Bucșa	5	6	6

Semifinals
(Serbia) N Kostić	7	2	6
(Spain) C Bucșa	5	6	3
