= 2022 Caldas da Rainha Ladies Open – Singles =

Singles
- 2022 Caldas da Rainha Ladies Open

Final
- Champion: (Italy) Lucrezia Stefanini
- Runner-up: (Spain) Marina Bassols Ribera
- Score: 3–6, 6–1, 7–6^{(7–3)}

Events
Singles	Doubles
← 2021 ·	Caldas da Rainha Ladies Open	· 2023 →

Zheng Saisai was the defending champion but chose not to participate.

Lucrezia Stefanini won the title, defeating Marina Bassols Ribera in the final, 3–6, 6–1, 7–6^{(7–3)}.

== Seeds ==
1. Vitalia Diatchenko (quarterfinals)
2. (Australia) Maddison Inglis (second round, retired)
3. (Netherlands) Suzan Lamens (second round)
4. (Japan) Mai Hontama (second round)
5. (Netherlands) Lesley Pattinama Kerkhove (first round)
6. (United Kingdom) Yuriko Miyazaki (first round)
7. (Spain) Marina Bassols Ribera (final)
8. (Spain) Andrea Lázaro García (first round)

== Draw ==
=== Key ===
- Q = Qualifier
- WC = Wild card
- LL = Lucky loser
- Alt = Alternate
- SE = Special exempt
- PR = Protected ranking
- ITF = ITF entry
- JE = Junior exempt
- w/o = Walkover
- r = Retired
- d = Defaulted
- SR = Special ranking

=== Finals ===
Semifinals
(Italy) Lucrezia Stefanini	6	6
PR	(Colombia) Emiliana Arango	2	1
Q	(Denmark) Olga Helmi	0	4
7	(Spain) Marina Bassols Ribera	6	6

Final
(Italy) Lucrezia Stefanini	3	6	7^{7}
7	(Spain) Marina Bassols Ribera	6	1	6^{3}

=== Top half ===
First round
1	V Diatchenko	6	6
Q	(United States) H Inoue	1	4
LL	(Portugal) AF Santos	5	1
(United States) J Loeb	7	6
Q	(United States) A Rogers	2	4
(Portugal) F Jorge	6	6
(Italy) L Stefanini	6	6
8	(Spain) A Lázaro García	4	4
3	(Netherlands) S Lamens	6	6
A Kubareva	2	1
(Hong Kong) E Chong	4	6	6
Q	(United States) T Ng	6	4	3
(Hong Kong) A Karunaratne	0	3
PR	(Colombia) E Arango	6	6
Q	(Japan) S Hosogi	5	6	6
5	(Netherlands) L Pattinama Kerkhove	7	4	4

Second round
1	V Diatchenko	4	6	6
(United States) J Loeb	6	0	2
(Portugal) F Jorge	4	4
(Italy) L Stefanini	6	6
3	(Netherlands) S Lamens	4	3
(Hong Kong) E Chong	6	6
PR	(Colombia) E Arango	4	6	6
Q	(Japan) S Hosogi	6	3	4

Quarterfinals
1	V Diatchenko	1	4
(Italy) L Stefanini	6	6
(Hong Kong) E Chong	5	1
PR	(Colombia) E Arango	7	6

Semifinals
(Italy) L Stefanini	6	6
PR	(Colombia) E Arango	2	1

=== Bottom half ===
First round
6	(United Kingdom) Y Miyazaki	3	6	5
(United Kingdom) E Silva	6	4	7
Q	(Serbia) K Jokić	7	3	3
Q	(Denmark) O Helmi	5	6	6
Y Hatouka	6	7^{7}
WC	(Spain) G García Pérez	4	6^{3}
Q	(Mexico) M Portillo Ramírez	1	2
4	(Japan) M Hontama	6	6
7	(Spain) M Bassols Ribera	4	6	6
A Tikhonova	6	2	4
WC	(Japan) H Kuwata	6	7
WC	(Portugal) M Garcia	1	5
(Slovakia) V Morvayová	2	2
Q	(United States) A Reami	6	6
WC	(Portugal) M Jorge	5	5
2	(Australia) M Inglis	7	7

Second round
(United Kingdom) E Silva	1	6	0
Q	(Denmark) O Helmi	6	2	6
Y Hatouka	6	7^{7}
4	(Japan) M Hontama	2	6^{3}
7	(Spain) M Bassols Ribera	6	6
WC	(Japan) H Kuwata	0	0
Q	(United States) A Reami	6	0
2	(Australia) M Inglis	4	1^{r}

Quarterfinals
Q	(Denmark) O Helmi	6	2	7^{7}
Y Hatouka	2	6	6^{5}
7	(Spain) M Bassols Ribera	6^{3}	6	6
Q	(United States) A Reami	7^{7}	2	3

Semifinals
Q	(Denmark) O Helmi	0	4
7	(Spain) M Bassols Ribera	6	6
