= 2022 Caldas da Rainha Ladies Open – Doubles =

Doubles
- 2022 Caldas da Rainha Ladies Open

Final
- Champions: (United States) Adriana Reami (United States) Anna Rogers
- Runners-up: (United States) Elysia Bolton (United States) Jamie Loeb
- Score: 6–4, 7–5

Events
Singles	Doubles
← 2021 ·	Caldas da Rainha Ladies Open	· 2023 →

Momoko Kobori and Hiroko Kuwata were the defending champions but Kobori chose not to participate. Kuwata partnered alongside Kateryna Volodko, but lost in the semifinals to Adriana Reami and Anna Rogers.

Reami and Rogers went on to win the title, defeating Elysia Bolton and Jamie Loeb in the final, 6–4, 7–5.

== Seeds ==
1. (Netherlands) Suzan Lamens / (Netherlands) Lesley Pattinama Kerkhove (first round)
2. (Portugal) Francisca Jorge / (Portugal) Matilde Jorge (semifinals)
3. (Spain) Marina Bassols Ribera / (Spain) Andrea Lázaro García (quarterfinals, withdrew)
4. (Japan) Hiroko Kuwata / (Ukraine) Kateryna Volodko (semifinals)

== Draw ==
=== Key ===
- Q = Qualifier
- WC = Wild card
- LL = Lucky loser
- Alt = Alternate
- SE = Special exempt
- PR = Protected ranking
- ITF = ITF entry
- JE = Junior exempt
- w/o = Walkover
- r = Retired
- d = Defaulted
- SR = Special ranking

=== Draw ===
First round
1	(Netherlands) S Lamens (Netherlands) L Pattinama Kerkhove	6^{2}	4
Y Hatouka; A Tikhonova	7^{7}	6
(Spain) M González Encinas (Portugal) AF Santos	2	3
(United States) A Reami (United States) A Rogers	6	6
4	(Japan) H Kuwata (Ukraine) K Volodko	6	0	[10]
(Netherlands) I Haverlag (United Kingdom) Y Miyazaki	2	6	[4]
(Estonia) E Malõgina (Mexico) MF Navarro	6^{4}	6	[10]
(Portugal) S Lança (China) F Xun	7^{7}	3	[7]
(United States) E Bolton (United States) J Loeb	6	6
(Japan) M Hontama (United Kingdom) E Silva	4	2
(France) G Kalamaris (Spain) V Koussenkova	0	1
3	(Spain) M Bassols Ribera (Spain) A Lázaro García	6	6
(Serbia) K Jokić (United States) T Ng	6	6
(Portugal) A Pellizzari (Brazil) G Pereira de Aguiar	0	1
(Portugal) M Sequeira (United Kingdom) A Sutherland	1	4
2	(Portugal) F Jorge (United Kingdom) M Jorge	6	6

Quarterfinals
Y Hatouka; A Tikhonova	7	4	[8]
(United States) A Reami (United States) A Rogers	5	6	[10]
4	(Japan) H Kuwata (Ukraine) K Volodko	6	7^{7}
(Estonia) E Malõgina (Mexico) MF Navarro	2	6^{4}
(United States) E Bolton (United States) J Loeb	w/o
3	(Spain) M Bassols Ribera (Spain) A Lázaro García
(Serbia) K Jokić (United States) T Ng	3	6^{3}
2	(Portugal) F Jorge (United Kingdom) M Jorge	6	7^{7}

Semifinals
(United States) A Reami (United States) A Rogers	6	6
4	(Japan) H Kuwata (Ukraine) K Volodko	4	3
(United States) E Bolton (United States) J Loeb	6	3	[10]
2	(Portugal) F Jorge (United Kingdom) M Jorge	4	6	[6]

Final
(United States) A Reami (United States) A Rogers	6	7
(United States) E Bolton (United States) J Loeb	4	5
