= 2019 Oeste Ladies Open =

- Date: 23–29 September 2019
- Edition: 1st
- Category: ITF Women's World Tennis Tour
- Prize money: $60,000
- Surface: Hard
- Location: Caldas da Rainha, Portugal

Champions

Singles
- (Bulgaria) Isabella Shinikova

Doubles
- (France) Jessika Ponchet / (Bulgaria) Isabella Shinikova
Oeste Ladies Open	· 2021 →

The 2019 Oeste Ladies Open was a professional tennis tournament played on outdoor hard courts. It was the first edition of the tournament which was part of the 2019 ITF Women's World Tennis Tour. It took place in Caldas da Rainha, Portugal between 23 and 29 September 2019.

== Singles main-draw entrants ==
=== Seeds ===
Country	Player	Rank^{1}	Seed
EST	Kaia Kanepi	114	1
ITA	Giulia Gatto-Monticone	161	2
BUL	Viktoriya Tomova	181	3
TUR	Pemra Özgen	185	4
GER	Katharina Hobgarski	193	5
LAT	Diāna Marcinkēviča	196	6
FRA	Jessika Ponchet	202	7
BUL	Elitsa Kostova	207	8

- ^{1} Rankings are as of 16 September 2019.

=== Other entrants ===
The following players received wildcards into the singles main draw:

- (Portugal) Maria Inês Fonte
- (Portugal) Francisca Jorge
- (Portugal) Inês Murta
- (Brazil) Laura Pigossi

The following players received entry from the qualifying draw:

- (Spain) Ainhoa Atucha Gómez
- (Argentina) Victoria Bosio
- (United Kingdom) Sarah Beth Grey
- (Switzerland) Karin Kennel
- (Italy) Verena Meliss
- (Czech Republic) Laetitia Pulchartová
- (Russia) Ekaterina Shalimova
- (United Kingdom) Eden Silva

The following player received entry as a lucky loser:

- (Spain) Olga Parres Azcoitia

== Champions ==
=== Singles ===
- (Bulgaria) Isabella Shinikova def. (Serbia) Natalija Kostić, 6–3, 2–0, ret.

=== Doubles ===
- (France) Jessika Ponchet / (Bulgaria) Isabella Shinikova def. (Kazakhstan) Anna Danilina / (Germany) Vivian Heisen, 6–1, 6–3
