= 2019 BGL Luxembourg Open – Singles =

Singles
- 2019 BGL Luxembourg Open

Final
- Champion: (Latvia) Jeļena Ostapenko
- Runner-up: (Germany) Julia Görges
- Score: 6–4, 6–1

Details
- Draw: 32
- Seeds: 8

Events
Singles	Doubles
- BGL Luxembourg Open

Defending champion Julia Görges lost to Jeļena Ostapenko in the final, 6–4, 6–1.

== Seeds ==
1. (Belgium) Elise Mertens (second round)
2. (Germany) Julia Görges (final)
3. (Kazakhstan) Elena Rybakina (semifinals)
4. (Belgium) Alison Van Uytvanck (first round, retired)
5. (Slovakia) Viktória Kužmová (second round)
6. (Italy) Camila Giorgi (first round)
7. (France) Fiona Ferro (first round)
8. (Russia) Anna Blinkova (semifinals)

== Draw ==
Key

- Q = Qualifier
- WC = Wild card
- LL = Lucky loser
- Alt = Alternate
- ITF = ITF entry
- PR = Protected ranking
- SR = Special ranking
- SE = Special exempt
- JE = Junior exempt
- JR = Junior Accelerator Programme entrant
- CO = College Accelerator Programme entrant
- NG = Next Gen Accelerator Program entrant
- w/o = Walkover
- r = Retired
- d = Defaulted

=== Finals ===
Semifinals
WC	(Latvia) Jeļena Ostapenko	3	6	6
8	(Russia) Anna Blinkova	6	3	2
3	(Kazakhstan) Elena Rybakina	3	4
2	(Germany) Julia Görges	6	6

Final
WC	(Latvia) Jeļena Ostapenko	6	6
2	(Germany) Julia Görges	4	1

=== Top half ===
First round
1	(Belgium) E Mertens	6	6
LL	(Netherlands) B Schoofs	0	3
(United States) C McNally	5	6^{3}
WC	(Latvia) J Ostapenko	7	7^{7}
Q	(Germany) A Lottner	4	6	6
(Germany) T Korpatsch	6	3	2
(Germany) A Petkovic	0	6	6
6	(Italy) C Giorgi	6	4	4
4	(Belgium) A Van Uytvanck	4^{r}
Q	(Romania) M Niculescu	2
(Switzerland) J Teichmann	6	6^{4}	3
(Russia) M Gasparyan	2	7^{7}	6
PR	(United States) S Rogers	3	6	4
(Germany) T Maria	6	1	6
(United States) C Gauff	4	0
8	(Russia) A Blinkova	6	6

Second round
1	(Belgium) E Mertens	6	2	2
WC	(Latvia) J Ostapenko	4	6	6
Q	(Germany) A Lottner	6	0
(Germany) A Petkovic	1	0^{r}
Q	(Romania) M Niculescu	2	5
(Russia) M Gasparyan	6	7
(Germany) T Maria	0	1
8	(Russia) A Blinkova	6	6

Quarterfinals
WC	(Latvia) J Ostapenko	6	6
Q	(Germany) A Lottner	1	1
(Russia) M Gasparyan	3	0^{r}
8	(Russia) A Blinkova	6	1

Semifinals
WC	(Latvia) J Ostapenko	3	6	6
8	(Russia) A Blinkova	6	3	2

=== Bottom half ===
First round
5	(Slovakia) V Kužmová	6^{4}	7^{7}	6
WC	(United States) K Volynets	7^{7}	6^{1}	1
(Germany) L Siegemund	4	7	6
Q	(Ukraine) M Kostyuk	6	5	2
PR	(Czech Republic) D Allertová	6^{7}	7^{7}	7^{8}
WC	(Luxembourg) M Minella	7^{9}	6^{5}	6^{6}
Q	(France) C Paquet	2	6^{2}
3	(Kazakhstan) E Rybakina	6	7^{7}
7	(France) F Ferro	1	0
(Puerto Rico) M Puig	6	6
(Czech Republic) Kr Plíšková	6	7^{7}
(Spain) A Bolsova	2	6^{4}
(France) P Parmentier	3	4
(Romania) S Cîrstea	6	6
(Japan) M Doi	7	1	3
2	(Germany) J Görges	5	6	6

Second round
5	(Slovakia) V Kužmová	2	3
(Germany) L Siegemund	6	6
PR	(Czech Republic) D Allertová	2	1
3	(Kazakhstan) E Rybakina	6	6
(Puerto Rico) M Puig	7^{7}	3	7^{8}
(Czech Republic) Kr Plíšková	6^{5}	6	6^{6}
(Romania) S Cîrstea	6	4	4
2	(Germany) J Görges	4	6	6

Quarterfinals
(Germany) L Siegemund	0	4
3	(Kazakhstan) E Rybakina	6	6
(Puerto Rico) M Puig	6	2	3
2	(Germany) J Görges	1	6	6

Semifinals
3	(Kazakhstan) E Rybakina	3	4
2	(Germany) J Görges	6	6

== Qualifying ==
=== Seeds ===
1. (Serbia) Nina Stojanović (second round)
2. (Romania) Monica Niculescu (qualified)
3. (Belgium) Ysaline Bonaventure (qualifying competition)
4. (Switzerland) Stefanie Vögele (qualifying competition, withdrew)
5. (Slovenia) Kaja Juvan (second round)
6. (United States) Varvara Lepchenko (second round)
7. (France) Chloé Paquet (qualified)
8. (Netherlands) Bibiane Schoofs (second round, lucky loser)

=== Qualifiers ===
1. (Germany) Antonia Lottner
2. (Romania) Monica Niculescu
3. (France) Chloé Paquet
4. (Ukraine) Marta Kostyuk

=== Lucky loser ===
1. (Netherlands) Bibiane Schoofs

=== Draw ===
==== First qualifier ====
First round
1	(Serbia) Nina Stojanović	6	6
(Turkey) Pemra Özgen	2	3
(Netherlands) Richèl Hogenkamp	2	5
(Germany) Antonia Lottner	6	7
(Brazil) Luisa Stefani	4	6^{2}
Alt	(Czech Republic) Renata Voráčová	6	7^{7}
(Germany) Katharina Hobgarski	2	7^{7}	3
6	(United States) Varvara Lepchenko	6	6^{4}	6

Second round
1	(Serbia) Nina Stojanović	6	4	0
(Germany) Antonia Lottner	0	6	6
Alt	(Czech Republic) Renata Voráčová	7	7^{8}
6	(United States) Varvara Lepchenko	5	6^{6}

Qualifying competition
(Germany) Antonia Lottner	7^{7}	6
Alt	(Czech Republic) Renata Voráčová	6^{5}	2

==== Second qualifier ====
First round
2	(Romania) Monica Niculescu	7^{7}	6
(France) Amandine Hesse	6^{2}	4
WC	(France) Victoria Muntean	5	6	1
(United Kingdom) Eden Silva	7	3	6
(Germany) Stephanie Wagner	7^{7}	2	0
(Romania) Elena-Gabriela Ruse	6^{2}	6	6
(Latvia) Diāna Marcinkēviča	6^{4}	5
8	(Netherlands) Bibiane Schoofs	7^{7}	7

Second round
2	(Romania) Monica Niculescu	3	6	6
(United Kingdom) Eden Silva	6	2	2
(Romania) Elena-Gabriela Ruse	6	6
8	(Netherlands) Bibiane Schoofs	2	4

Qualifying competition
2	(Romania) Monica Niculescu	6	6
(Romania) Elena-Gabriela Ruse	1	1

==== Third qualifier ====
First round
3	(Belgium) Ysaline Bonaventure	6	6
(Netherlands) Quirine Lemoine	1	2
(Slovenia) Dalila Jakupović	2	3
(France) Jessika Ponchet	6	6
(Romania) Laura Ioana Paar	2	4
(Poland) Katarzyna Piter	6	6
(United States) Elizabeth Mandlik	3	2
7	(France) Chloé Paquet	6	6

Second round
3	(Belgium) Ysaline Bonaventure	4	6	7
(France) Jessika Ponchet	6	1	5
(Poland) Katarzyna Piter	6^{5}	7^{7}	3
7	(France) Chloé Paquet	7^{7}	6^{4}	6

Qualifying competition
3	(Belgium) Ysaline Bonaventure	6	5	2
7	(France) Chloé Paquet	1	7	6

==== Fourth qualifier ====
First round
4	(Switzerland) Stefanie Vögele	6	6
(Luxembourg) Eléonora Molinaro	1	3
WC	(Italy) Claudia Coppola	2	3
(Netherlands) Lesley Pattinama Kerkhove	6	6
(Greece) Despina Papamichail	4	3
(Ukraine) Marta Kostyuk	6	6
WC	(France) Tatiana Golovin	3	1
5	(Slovenia) Kaja Juvan	6	6

Second round
4	(Switzerland) Stefanie Vögele	6	4	7^{7}
(Netherlands) Lesley Pattinama Kerkhove	2	6	6^{5}
(Ukraine) Marta Kostyuk	6	6
5	(Slovenia) Kaja Juvan	0	4

Qualifying competition
4	(Switzerland) Stefanie Vögele
(Ukraine) Marta Kostyuk	w/o
