= 2022 Caldas da Rainha Ladies Open =

Tennis tournament

- Date: 12–18 September 2022
- Edition: 3rd
- Category: ITF Women's World Tennis Tour
- Prize money: $60,000+H
- Surface: Hard / Outdoor
- Location: Caldas da Rainha, Portugal

Champions

Singles
- (Italy) Lucrezia Stefanini

Doubles
- (United States) Adriana Reami / (United States) Anna Rogers
| ← 2021 · | Caldas da Rainha Ladies Open | · 2023 → |

The 2022 Caldas da Rainha Ladies Open was a professional tennis tournament played on outdoor hard courts. It was the third edition of the tournament which was part of the 2022 ITF Women's World Tennis Tour. It took place in Caldas da Rainha, Portugal between 12 and 18 September 2022.

== Champions ==
=== Singles ===
- (Italy) Lucrezia Stefanini def. (Spain) Marina Bassols Ribera, 3–6, 6–1, 7–6^{(7–3)}

=== Doubles ===
- (United States) Adriana Reami / (United States) Anna Rogers def. (United States) Elysia Bolton / (United States) Jamie Loeb, 6–4, 7–5

== Singles main draw entrants ==
=== Seeds ===
| Country | Player | Rank^{1} | Seed |
|---|---|---|---|
| | Vitalia Diatchenko | 119 | 1 |
| AUS | Maddison Inglis | 134 | 2 |
| NED | Suzan Lamens | 184 | 3 |
| JPN | Mai Hontama | 194 | 4 |
| NED | Lesley Pattinama Kerkhove | 195 | 5 |
| GBR | Yuriko Miyazaki | 202 | 6 |
| ESP | Marina Bassols Ribera | 206 | 7 |
| ESP | Andrea Lázaro García | 225 | 8 |

- ^{1} Rankings are as of 29 August 2022.

=== Other entrants ===
The following players received wildcards into the singles main draw:

- (Portugal) Maria Garcia
- (Spain) Georgina García Pérez
- (Portugal) Matilde Jorge
- (Japan) Hiroko Kuwata

The following player received entry into the singles main draw using a protected ranking:

- (Colombia) Emiliana Arango

The following players received entry from the qualifying draw:

- (Denmark) Olga Helmi
- (Japan) Sakura Hosogi
- (United States) Hina Inoue
- (Serbia) Katarina Jokić
- (United States) Taylor Ng
- (Mexico) María Portillo Ramírez
- (United States) Adriana Reami
- (United States) Anna Rogers

The following player received entry as a lucky loser:

- (Portugal) Ana Filipa Santos
