= 2019 BGL Luxembourg Open =

Upcoming professional women tennis tournament in Luxembourg

- Date: 14–20 October
- Edition: 24th
- Category: WTA International
- Prize money: $250,000
- Surface: Hard (indoor)
- Location: Kockelscheuer, Luxembourg

Champions

Singles
- (Latvia) Jeļena Ostapenko

Doubles
- (United States) Coco Gauff / (United States) Caty McNally
← 2018 ·	Luxembourg Open	· 2021 →

The 2019 BGL BNP Paribas Luxembourg Open was a professional women's tennis tournament played on indoor hard courts sponsored by BNP Paribas. It was the 24th edition of the Luxembourg Open, and part of the WTA International tournaments category of the 2019 WTA Tour. It was held in Kockelscheuer, Luxembourg from 14 October to 20 October 2019. Unseeded Jeļena Ostapenko, who entered the main draw on a wildcard, won the singles title.

== Finals ==
=== Singles ===
- (Latvia) Jeļena Ostapenko defeated (Germany) Julia Görges, 6–4, 6–1

=== Doubles ===
- (United States) Coco Gauff / (United States) Caty McNally defeated (United States) Kaitlyn Christian / (Chile) Alexa Guarachi, 6–2, 6–2

== Points and prize money ==
=== Point distribution ===
Event	W	F	SF	QF	Round of 16	Round of 32	Q	Q3	Q2	Q1
Singles	280	180	110	60	30	1	18	14	10	1
Doubles	280	180	110	60	1	—	—	—	—	—

=== Prize money ===
Event	W	F	SF	QF	Round of 16	Round of 32^{1}	Q3	Q2	Q1
Singles	€34,677	€17,258	€9,113	€4,758	€2,669	€1,552	€810	€589	€427
Doubles *	€9,919	€5,161	€2,770	€1,468	€774	—	—	—	—

_{^{1} Qualifiers prize money is also the Round of 32 prize money}
_{* per team}

== Singles entrants ==
=== Seeds ===
Country	Player	Rank^{1}	Seed
BEL	Elise Mertens	19	1
GER	Julia Görges	27	2
KAZ	Elena Rybakina	43	3
BEL	Alison Van Uytvanck	44	4
SVK	Viktória Kužmová	53	5
ITA	Camila Giorgi	63	6
FRA	Fiona Ferro	65	7
RUS	Anna Blinkova	66	8

- Rankings as of 7 October 2019

=== Other entrants ===
The following players received wildcards into the singles main draw:

- (Luxembourg) Mandy Minella
- (Latvia) Jeļena Ostapenko
- (United States) Katie Volynets

The following player received entry using a protected ranking into the singles main draw:

- (Czech Republic) Denisa Allertová
- (United States) Shelby Rogers

The following players received entry from the qualifying draw:

- (Ukraine) Marta Kostyuk
- (Germany) Antonia Lottner
- (Romania) Monica Niculescu
- (France) Chloé Paquet

The following player received entry as a lucky loser:

- (Netherlands) Bibiane Schoofs

=== Withdrawals ===
Before the tournament

- (Czech Republic) Marie Bouzková → replaced by (Japan) Misaki Doi
- (United States) Madison Brengle → replaced by (Germany) Laura Siegemund
- (United States) Danielle Collins → replaced by (United States) Caty McNally
- (France) Alizé Cornet → replaced by (Germany) Tamara Korpatsch
- (Germany) Angelique Kerber → replaced by (Spain) Aliona Bolsova
- (Ukraine) Kateryna Kozlova → replaced by (Netherlands) Bibiane Schoofs
- (Sweden) Rebecca Peterson → replaced by (Germany) Tatjana Maria
- (Ukraine) Lesia Tsurenko → replaced by (Romania) Sorana Cîrstea

=== Retirements ===
- (Russia) Margarita Gasparyan (back injury)
- (Germany) Andrea Petkovic (left knee injury)
- (Belgium) Alison Van Uytvanck (left ankle injury)

== Doubles entrants ==
=== Seeds ===
Country	Player	Country	Player	Rank^{1}	Seed
CZE	Kristýna Plíšková	CZE	Renata Voráčová	119	1
USA	Kaitlyn Christian	CHI	Alexa Guarachi	137	2
RUS	Margarita Gasparyan	ROU	Monica Niculescu	144	3
RUS	Anna Blinkova	JPN	Miyu Kato	144	4

- ^{1} Rankings as of 7 October 2019

=== Other entrants ===
The following pairs received a wildcard into the doubles main draw:

- (United States) Elizabeth Mandlik / (United States) Katie Volynets
- (Luxembourg) Eléonora Molinaro / (Poland) Katarzyna Piter

The following pair received entry as alternates:

- (France) Amandine Hesse / (France) Chloé Paquet

=== Withdrawals ===
Before the tournament

- (Belgium) Ysaline Bonaventure (left shoulder injury)
- (Romania) Monica Niculescu (left lower leg injury)
