= 2021 BGL Luxembourg Open – Singles =

Singles
- 2021 BGL Luxembourg Open

Final
- Champion: (Denmark) Clara Tauson
- Runner-up: (Latvia) Jeļena Ostapenko
- Score: 6–3, 4–6, 6–4

Details
- Draw: 30
- Seeds: 8

Events
Singles	Doubles
- Luxembourg Open

Clara Tauson defeated defending champion Jeļena Ostapenko in the final, 6–3, 4–6, 6–4 to win the singles tennis title at the 2021 Luxembourg Open. It was her second WTA Tour singles title.

== Seeds ==
1. (Switzerland) Belinda Bencic (quarterfinals)
2. (Belgium) Elise Mertens (quarterfinals)
3. (Latvia) Jeļena Ostapenko (final)
4. (Russia) Ekaterina Alexandrova (second round)
5. (Czech Republic) Markéta Vondroušová (semifinals)
6. (China) Zhang Shuai (first round)
7. (Russia) Liudmila Samsonova (semifinals)
8. (France) Alizé Cornet (quarterfinals)

== Draw ==
Key

- Q = Qualifier
- WC = Wild card
- LL = Lucky loser
- Alt = Alternate
- ITF = ITF entry
- PR = Protected ranking
- SR = Special ranking
- SE = Special exempt
- JE = Junior exempt
- JR = Junior Accelerator Programme entrant
- CO = College Accelerator Programme entrant
- NG = Next Gen Accelerator Program entrant
- w/o = Walkover
- r = Retired
- d = Defaulted

=== Finals ===
Semifinals
7	(Russia) Liudmila Samsonova	1	6^{4}
3	(Latvia) Jeļena Ostapenko	6	7^{7}
(Denmark) Clara Tauson	6	2	6
5	(Czech Republic) Markéta Vondroušová	4	6	4

Final
3	(Latvia) Jeļena Ostapenko	3	6	4
(Denmark) Clara Tauson	6	4	6

=== Top half ===
First round
(Kazakhstan) Z Diyas	6	1	6
(Slovakia) AK Schmiedlová	0	6	4
(France) O Dodin	6^{4}	6	6
Q	(Russia) A Zakharova	7^{7}	4	3
(Japan) M Doi	2	3
7	(Russia) L Samsonova	6	6
3	(Latvia) J Ostapenko	6	6
Q	(Germany) J Niemeier	2	2
Q	(Netherlands) A Hartono	7^{7}	3	7^{7}
WC	(Germany) A-L Friedsam	6^{5}	6	6^{4}
(Russia) V Gracheva	3	4
WC	(Luxembourg) M Minella	6	6
(Russia) A Potapova	4	2
8	(France) A Cornet	6	6

Second round
1	(Switzerland) B Bencic	6	6
(Kazakhstan) Z Diyas	1	3
(France) O Dodin	6^{5}	6^{3}
7	(Russia) L Samsonova	7^{7}	7^{7}
3	(Latvia) J Ostapenko	6	4	6
Q	(Netherlands) A Hartono	2	6	1
WC	(Luxembourg) M Minella	3	3
8	(France) A Cornet	6	6

Quarterfinals
1	(Switzerland) B Bencic	1	4
7	(Russia) L Samsonova	6	6
3	(Latvia) J Ostapenko	7^{8}	6
8	(France) A Cornet	6^{6}	2

Semifinals
7	(Russia) L Samsonova	1	6^{4}
3	(Latvia) J Ostapenko	6	7^{7}

=== Bottom half ===
First round
6	(China) S Zhang	2	7^{7}	3
(Czech Republic) M Bouzková	6	6^{3}	6
(Belgium) G Minnen	7^{7}	6^{1}	7^{7}
(Spain) N Párrizas Díaz	6^{4}	7^{7}	6^{2}
(Australia) A Sharma	2	2
(Denmark) C Tauson	6	6
WC	(Switzerland) S Vögele	1	6	3
4	(Russia) E Alexandrova	6	3	6
5	(Czech Republic) M Vondroušová	6	6
(Belgium) A Van Uytvanck	2	3
Q	(Russia) E Makarova	3	3
Q	(Croatia) J Fett	6	6
Q	(Ukraine) L Tsurenko	5	6^{6}
(Belarus) A Sasnovich	7	7^{8}

Second round
(Czech Republic) M Bouzková	6	6
(Belgium) G Minnen	3	1
(Denmark) C Tauson	6	3	7^{7}
4	(Russia) E Alexandrova	4	6	6^{1}
5	(Czech Republic) M Vondroušová	6	6
Q	(Croatia) J Fett	2	4
(Belarus) A Sasnovich	6	2	5
2	(Belgium) E Mertens	3	6	7

Quarterfinals
(Czech Republic) M Bouzková	3	2
(Denmark) C Tauson	6	6
5	(Czech Republic) M Vondroušová	7	6
2	(Belgium) E Mertens	5	2

Semifinals
(Denmark) C Tauson	6	2	6
5	(Czech Republic) M Vondroušová	4	6	4

== Qualifying ==
=== Seeds ===
1. (Australia) Astra Sharma (moved to main draw)
2. (Russia) Vitalia Diatchenko (first round, retired)
3. (Germany) Jule Niemeier (qualified)
4. (Germany) Tamara Korpatsch (first round)
5. (Spain) Cristina Bucșa (qualifying competition)
6. (Russia) Anastasia Gasanova (qualifying competition)
7. (Russia) Natalia Vikhlyantseva (first round)
8. (Ukraine) Lesia Tsurenko (qualified)
9. (Spain) Lara Arruabarrena (first round)
10. (Netherlands) Indy de Vroome (first round)
11. (Croatia) Jana Fett (qualified)
12. (Bulgaria) Isabella Shinikova (first round)

=== Qualifiers ===
1. (Russia) Anastasia Zakharova
2. (Russia) Ekaterina Makarova
3. (Germany) Jule Niemeier
4. (Netherlands) Arianne Hartono
5. (Ukraine) Lesia Tsurenko
6. (Croatia) Jana Fett

=== Draw ===
==== First qualifier ====
First round
Alt	(Japan) Makoto Ninomiya	6	6
(Norway) Ulrikke Eikeri	4	3
(Russia) Anastasia Zakharova	6	6
9	(Spain) Lara Arruabarrena	4	3

Qualifying competition
Alt	(Japan) Makoto Ninomiya	0	3
(Russia) Anastasia Zakharova	6	6

==== Second qualifier ====
First round
2	(Russia) Vitalia Diatchenko	5	1^{r}
(Russia) Ekaterina Makarova	7	4
(Germany) Yana Morderger	4	7^{7}	6
10	(Netherlands) Indy de Vroome	6	6^{3}	3

Qualifying competition
(Russia) Ekaterina Makarova	6	6
(Germany) Yana Morderger	3	0

==== Third qualifier ====
First round
3	(Germany) Jule Niemeier	7^{7}	4	6
(Germany) Lena Papadakis	6^{3}	6	3
(Czech Republic) Tereza Smitková	6	6
7	(Russia) Natalia Vikhlyantseva	4	0

Qualifying competition
3	(Germany) Jule Niemeier	6^{3}	6	6
(Czech Republic) Tereza Smitková	7^{7}	3	4

==== Fourth qualifier ====
First round
4	(Germany) Tamara Korpatsch	0	2
(Netherlands) Arianne Hartono	6	6
(Germany) Tayisiya Morderger	7^{7}	6
12	(Bulgaria) Isabella Shinikova	6^{5}	3

Qualifying competition
(Netherlands) Arianne Hartono	7	6
(Germany) Tayisiya Morderger	5	2

==== Fifth qualifier ====
First round
5	(Spain) Cristina Bucșa	6	6
WC	(Luxembourg) Marie Weckerle	1	2
(Japan) Eri Hozumi	3	6	2
8	(Ukraine) Lesia Tsurenko	6	3	6

Qualifying competition
5	(Spain) Cristina Bucșa	3	6	4
8	(Ukraine) Lesia Tsurenko	6	2	6

==== Sixth qualifier ====
First round
6	(Russia) Anastasia Gasanova	7	6
(Australia) Olivia Tjandramulia	5	0
(Russia) Angelina Gabueva	6^{3}	2
11	(Croatia) Jana Fett	7^{7}	6

Qualifying competition
6	(Russia) Anastasia Gasanova	1	0
11	(Croatia) Jana Fett	6	6
