= 2021 BGL Luxembourg Open – Doubles =

Doubles
- 2021 BGL Luxembourg Open

Final
- Champions: (Belgium) Greet Minnen (Belgium) Alison Van Uytvanck
- Runners-up: (New Zealand) Erin Routliffe (Belgium) Kimberley Zimmermann
- Score: 6–3, 6–3

Details
- Draw: 16
- Seeds: 4

Events
| Singles | Doubles |
| ← 2019 · | BGL Luxembourg Open |

Coco Gauff and Caty McNally were the reigning champions, having won the last edition in 2019, but chose not to defend their title.

Greet Minnen and Alison Van Uytvanck won the title, defeating Erin Routliffe and Kimberley Zimmermann in the final, 6–3, 6–3.

== Seeds ==
1. (Czech Republic) Marie Bouzková / (Czech Republic) Lucie Hradecká (quarterfinals)
2. (India) Sania Mirza / (China) Zhang Shuai (quarterfinals)
3. (Japan) Eri Hozumi / (Japan) Makoto Ninomiya (semifinals)
4. (Belarus) Lidziya Marozava / (Romania) Andreea Mitu (first round)

== Draw ==
Key

- Q = Qualifier
- WC = Wild card
- LL = Lucky loser
- Alt = Alternate
- ITF = ITF entry
- PR = Protected ranking
- SR = Special ranking
- SE = Special exempt
- JE = Junior exempt
- JR = Junior Accelerator Programme entrant
- CO = College Accelerator Programme entrant
- NG = Next Gen Accelerator Program entrant
- w/o = Walkover
- r = Retired
- d = Defaulted

=== Draw ===
First round
1 | (Czech Republic) M Bouzková (Czech Republic) L Hradecká | 6 | 7^{7}
WC | (Luxembourg) M Minella (Russia) L Samsonova | 2 | 6^{5}
PR | (Russia) V Diatchenko (Russia) Y Sizikova | 6 | 4 | [10]
(Georgia (country)) O Kalashnikova (Russia) A Panova | 3 | 6 | [8]
4 | (Belarus) L Marozava (Romania) A Mitu | 4 | 5
(New Zealand) E Routliffe (Belgium) K Zimmermann | 6 | 7
(Germany) V Heisen (Poland) A Rosolska | 6 | 4 | [8]
(Norway) U Eikeri (Russia) V Gracheva | 4 | 6 | [10]
WC | (Germany) A-L Friedsam (Germany) L Papadakis | 6 | 6
(United States) K Christian (Slovakia) AK Schmiedlová | 2 | 4
(Netherlands) A Hartono (Australia) O Tjandramulia | 6^{5} | 6 | [8]
3 | (Japan) E Hozumi (Japan) M Ninomiya | 7^{7} | 4 | [10]
(Belgium) G Minnen (Belgium) A Van Uytvanck | 6 | 6
(Australia) A Sharma (Netherlands) R van der Hoek | 4 | 2
(Germany) T Morderger (Germany) Y Morderger | 2 | 3
2 | (India) S Mirza (China) S Zhang | 6 | 6

Quarterfinals
1 | (Czech Republic) M Bouzková (Czech Republic) L Hradecká | 5 | 6^{5}
PR | (Russia) V Diatchenko (Russia) Y Sizikova | 7 | 7^{7}
(New Zealand) E Routliffe (Belgium) K Zimmermann | 5 | 6 | [10]
(Norway) U Eikeri (Russia) V Gracheva | 7 | 2 | [8]
WC | (Germany) A-L Friedsam (Germany) L Papadakis | 4 | 2
3 | (Japan) E Hozumi (Japan) M Ninomiya | 6 | 6
(Belgium) G Minnen (Belgium) A Van Uytvanck | 3 | 6 | [10]
2 | (India) S Mirza (China) S Zhang | 6 | 3 | [8]

Semifinals
PR | (Russia) V Diatchenko (Russia) Y Sizikova | 4 | 2
(New Zealand) E Routliffe (Belgium) K Zimmermann | 6 | 6
3 | (Japan) E Hozumi (Japan) M Ninomiya | 3 | 6^{2}
(Belgium) G Minnen (Belgium) A Van Uytvanck | 6 | 7^{7}

Final
(New Zealand) E Routliffe (Belgium) K Zimmermann | 3 | 3
(Belgium) G Minnen (Belgium) A Van Uytvanck | 6 | 6
