= 2019 BGL Luxembourg Open – Doubles =

Doubles
- 2019 BGL Luxembourg Open

Final
- Champions: (United States) Coco Gauff (United States) Caty McNally
- Runners-up: (United States) Kaitlyn Christian (Chile) Alexa Guarachi
- Score: 6–2, 6–2

Details
- Draw: 16
- Seeds: 4

Events
Singles	Doubles
← 2018 ·	BGL Luxembourg Open	· 2021 →

Greet Minnen and Alison Van Uytvanck were the defending champions, but chose not to defend their title.

Coco Gauff and Caty McNally won the title, defeating Kaitlyn Christian and Alexa Guarachi in the final, 6–2, 6–2.

== Seeds ==
1. (Czech Republic) Kristýna Plíšková / (Czech Republic) Renata Voráčová (semifinals)
2. (United States) Kaitlyn Christian / (Chile) Alexa Guarachi (final)
3. (Russia) Margarita Gasparyan / (Romania) Monica Niculescu (withdrew)
4. (Russia) Anna Blinkova / (Japan) Miyu Kato (quarterfinals)

== Draw ==
Key

- Q = Qualifier
- WC = Wild card
- LL = Lucky loser
- Alt = Alternate
- ITF = ITF entry
- PR = Protected ranking
- SR = Special ranking
- SE = Special exempt
- JE = Junior exempt
- JR = Junior Accelerator Programme entrant
- CO = College Accelerator Programme entrant
- NG = Next Gen Accelerator Program entrant
- w/o = Walkover
- r = Retired
- d = Defaulted

=== Draw ===
First round
1	(Czech Republic) Kr Plíšková (Czech Republic) R Voráčová	6	6
(France) F Ferro (Switzerland) J Teichmann	2	2
(Netherlands) L Pattinama Kerkhove (Netherlands) B Schoofs	7	6
Alt	(France) A Hesse (France) C Paquet	5	3
4	(Russia) A Blinkova (Japan) M Kato	2	7	[10]
(Canada) S Fichman (Russia) Y Sizikova	6	5	[7]
(United States) C Gauff (United States) C McNally	6	6^{5}	[10]
(Japan) M Doi (Japan) M Ninomiya	3	7^{7}	[5]
(United States) H Carter (Brazil) L Stefani	6	6
(Slovenia) D Jakupović (United States) S Santamaria	3	3
WC	(Luxembourg) E Molinaro (Poland) K Piter	w/o
3	(Russia) M Gasparyan (Romania) M Niculescu
(Switzerland) X Knoll (Luxembourg) M Minella	6	6
(United Kingdom) N Broady (United Kingdom) E Silva	4	4
WC	(United States) E Mandlik (United States) K Volynets	1	4
2	(United States) K Christian (Chile) A Guarachi	6	6

Quarterfinals
1	(Czech Republic) Kr Plíšková (Czech Republic) R Voráčová	6	6
(Netherlands) L Pattinama Kerkhove (Netherlands) B Schoofs	1	4
4	(Russia) A Blinkova (Japan) M Kato	4	4
(United States) C Gauff (United States) C McNally	6	6
(United States) H Carter (Brazil) L Stefani	6	6
WC	(Luxembourg) E Molinaro (Poland) K Piter	0	3
(Switzerland) X Knoll (Luxembourg) M Minella	2	6^{6}
2	(United States) K Christian (Chile) A Guarachi	6	7^{8}

Semifinals
1	(Czech Republic) Kr Plíšková (Czech Republic) R Voráčová	2	4
(United States) C Gauff (United States) C McNally	6	6
(United States) H Carter (Brazil) L Stefani	4	6	[9]
2	(United States) K Christian (Chile) A Guarachi	6	3	[11]

Final
(United States) C Gauff (United States) C McNally	6	6
2	(United States) K Christian (Chile) A Guarachi	2	2
