= 2021 BGL Luxembourg Open =

- Date: 13–19 September
- Edition: 25th
- Category: WTA 250
- Draw: 30S / 16D
- Prize money: $235,238
- Surface: Hard (indoor)
- Location: Kockelscheuer, Luxembourg

Champions

Singles
- (Denmark) Clara Tauson

Doubles
- (Belgium) Greet Minnen / (Belgium) Alison Van Uytvanck
← 2019 ·	Luxembourg Open

The 2021 BGL BNP Paribas Luxembourg Open was a professional women's tennis tournament played on indoor hard courts sponsored by BNP Paribas. It was the 25th edition of the Luxembourg Open, and part of the WTA 250 tournaments category of the 2021 WTA Tour. It was held in Kockelscheuer, Luxembourg from 13 to 19 September 2021.

== Finals ==
=== Singles ===
- (Denmark) Clara Tauson defeated (Latvia) Jeļena Ostapenko, 6–3, 4–6, 6–4

=== Doubles ===
- (Belgium) Greet Minnen / (Belgium) Alison Van Uytvanck defeated (New Zealand) Erin Routliffe / (Belgium) Kimberley Zimmermann 6–3, 6–3

== Points and prize money ==
=== Point distribution ===
Event	W	F	SF	QF	Round of 16	Round of 32	Q	Q2	Q1
Singles	280	180	110	60	30	1	18	12	1
Doubles	280	180	110	60	1	—	—	—	—

=== Prize money ===
Event	W	F	SF	QF	Round of 16	Round of 32^{1}	Q2	Q1
Singles	€23,548	€13,224	€8,145	€4,676	€2,990	€2,450	€1,575	€1,024
Doubles *	€8,306	€4,838	€3,064	€1,854	€1,412	—	—	—

_{^{1} Qualifiers prize money is also the Round of 32 prize money}
_{* per team}

== Singles main draw entrants ==
=== Seeds ===
Country	Player	Rank^{1}	Seed
SUI	Belinda Bencic	12	1
BEL	Elise Mertens	16	2
LAT	Jeļena Ostapenko	30	3
RUS	Ekaterina Alexandrova	34	4
CZE	Markéta Vondroušová	38	5
CHN	Zhang Shuai	49	6
RUS	Liudmila Samsonova	52	7
FRA	Alizé Cornet	56	8

- Rankings are as of August 30, 2021.

=== Other entrants ===
The following players received wildcards into the main draw:

- (Germany) Anna-Lena Friedsam
- (Luxembourg) Mandy Minella
- (Switzerland) Stefanie Vögele

The following players received entry from the qualifying draw:

- (Croatia) Jana Fett
- (Netherlands) Arianne Hartono
- (Russia) Ekaterina Makarova
- (Germany) Jule Niemeier
- (Ukraine) Lesia Tsurenko
- (Russia) Anastasia Zakharova

=== Withdrawals ===
Before the tournament

- (France) Clara Burel → replaced by (France) Océane Dodin
- (Germany) Andrea Petkovic → replaced by (Australia) Astra Sharma
- (Czech Republic) Kateřina Siniaková → replaced by (Belarus) Aliaksandra Sasnovich
- (Serbia) Nina Stojanović → replaced by (Denmark) Clara Tauson

== Doubles main draw entrants ==
=== Seeds ===
Country	Player	Country	Player	Rank^{1}	Seed
CZE	Marie Bouzková	CZE	Lucie Hradecká	93	1
IND	Sania Mirza	CHN	Zhang Shuai	150	2
JPN	Eri Hozumi	JPN	Makoto Ninomiya	162	3
BLR	Lidziya Marozava	ROU	Andreea Mitu	178	4

- Rankings are as of August 30, 2021.

=== Other entrants ===
The following pairs received wildcards into the doubles main draw:

- (Germany) Anna-Lena Friedsam / (Germany) Lena Papadakis
- (Luxembourg) Mandy Minella / (Russia) Liudmila Samsonova

The following pair received entry using a protected ranking:

- (Russia) Vitalia Diatchenko / (Russia) Yana Sizikova

=== Withdrawals ===
Before the tournament

- (Germany) Mona Barthel / (United States) Kaitlyn Christian → replaced by (United States) Kaitlyn Christian / (Slovakia) Anna Karolína Schmiedlová
