= Adriana Reami =

American tennis player (born 1997)

- Country (sports): United States
- Born: November 13, 1997 (age 28) Miami, Florida
- Plays: Right-handed
- College: NC State
- Prize money: $61,199

Singles
- Career record: 126–106
- Career titles: 4 ITF
- Highest ranking: No. 359 (November 7, 2022)
- Current ranking: No. 962 (July 27, 2026)

Doubles
- Career record: 39–70
- Career titles: 2 ITF
- Highest ranking: No. 225 (May 22, 2023)
- Current ranking: No. 1,166 (July 27, 2026)
- Last updated on: 3 August 2026.

Adriana Reami (born November 13, 1997) is an American tennis player.

Reami has a career-high singles ranking by the WTA of 359, achieved November 2022. She also has a career-high WTA doubles ranking of 225, reached on 22 May 2023.

Reami won her first $60k title at the 2022 Caldas da Rainha Ladies Open in the doubles draw, partnering Anna Rogers.

Reami played college tennis at the NC State.

== ITF Circuit finals ==
=== Singles: 5 (4 titles, 1 runner-up) ===
Legend W50 tournaments W25 tournaments W15 tournaments	Finals by surface Hard (4–1)

Result	W–L	Date	Tournament	Tier	Surface	Opponent	Score
Win	1–0	Jul 2019	ITF Cancún, Mexico	15,000	Hard	(Sweden) Linnea Malmqvist	6–3, 6–2
Win	2–0	Jul 2019	ITF Cancún, Mexico	15,000	Hard	(Brazil) Thaísa Grana Pedretti	7–6^{(2)}, 7–6^{(5)}
Win	3–0	Oct 2021	ITF Lubbock, United States	15,000	Hard	(United States) McCartney Kessler	7–6^{(6)}, 6–1
Win	4–0	Mar 2022	ITF Santo Domingo, Dominican Republic	25,000	Hard	(Switzerland) Joanne Züger	6–3, 7–5
Loss	4–1	Oct 2023	ITF Villena, Spain	15,000	Hard	(Italy) Anastasia Abbagnato	1–6, 2–6

=== Doubles: 3 (2 titles, 1 runner-up) ===
Legend W60 tournaments W15 tournaments	Finals by surface Hard (2–0) Clay (0–1)

Result	W-L	Date	Tournament	Tier	Surface	Partner	Opponents	Score
Win	1–0	Jul 2019	ITF Cancún, Mexico	15,000	Hard	(United States) Anna Rogers	(France) Tiphanie Fiquet (Lithuania) Justina Mikulskytė	7–6^{(1)}, 6–4
Win	2–0	Sep 2022	Caldas da Rainha Open, Portugal	W60	Hard	(United States) Anna Rogers	(United States) Elysia Bolton (United States) Jamie Loeb	6–4, 7–5
Loss	2–1	May 2023	Open Saint-Gaudens, France	W60	Clay	(Colombia) María Herazo González	Sofya Lansere (Czech Republic) Anna Sisková	0–6, 6–3, [6–10]
