= Inês Murta =

Portuguese tennis player (born 1997)

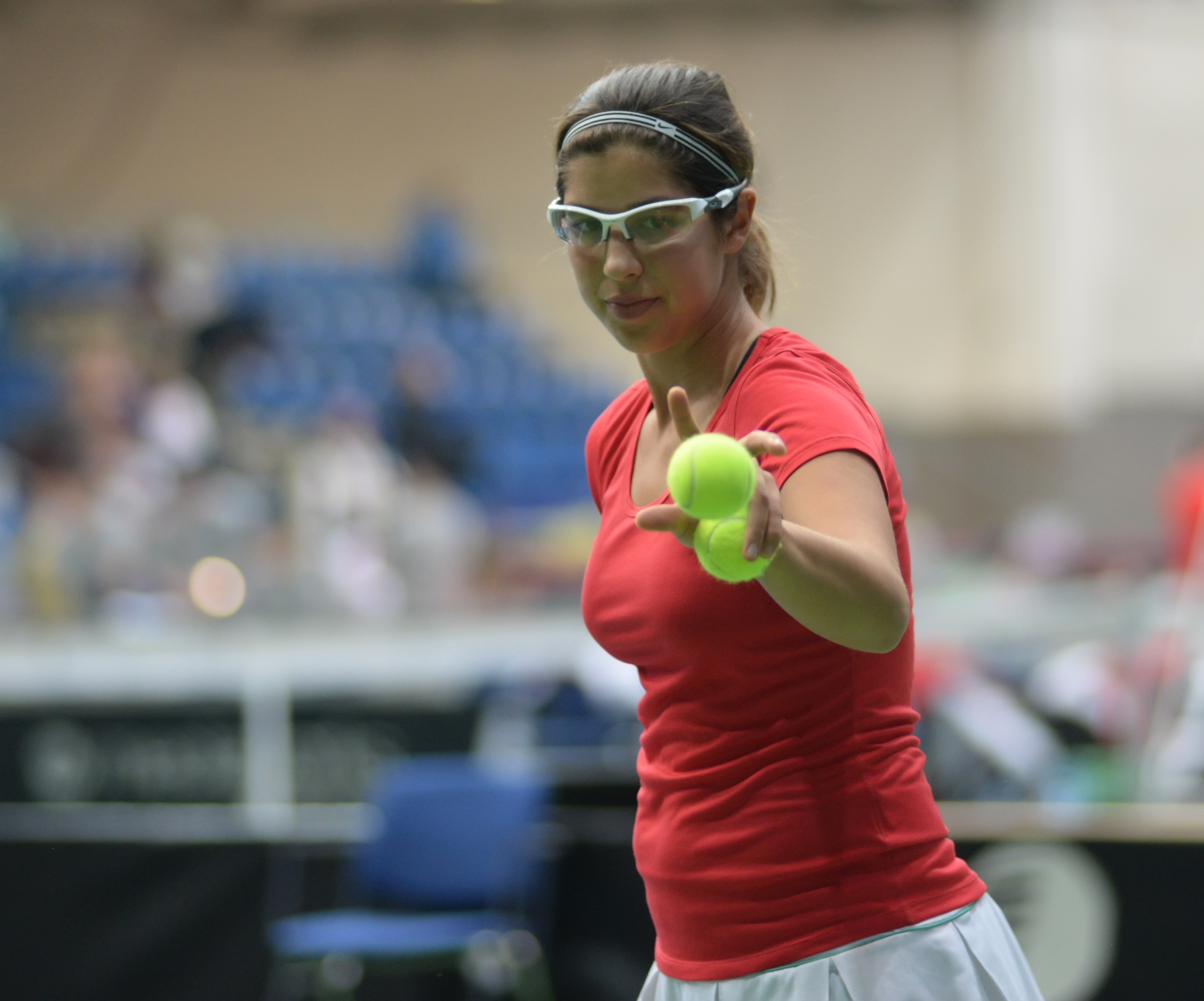
- Murta at the 2015 Fed Cup
- Full name: Inês Gaspar Murta
- Country (sports): Portugal
- Born: 31 May 1997 (age 29) Faro, Portugal
- Plays: Right-handed
- Prize money: $87,169

Singles
- Career record: 211–202
- Highest ranking: No. 546 (6 February 2017)
- Current ranking: No. 1,186 (29 June 2026)

Doubles
- Career record: 213–150
- Career titles: 17 ITF
- Highest ranking: No. 406 (19 September 2016)
- Current ranking: No. 1,377 (29 June 2026)

Team competitions
- Fed Cup: 6–11
- Last updated on: 7 July 2026.

Inês Gaspar Murta (born 31 May 1997) is a Portuguese tennis player. She is the sister of André Gaspar Murta who is also a professional tennis player.

== Career overview ==
Murta has won one singles title and seventeen doubles titles on the ITF Circuit. On 6 February 2017, she reached her best singles ranking of world No. 546. On 19 September 2016, she peaked at No. 406 in the doubles rankings.

Playing for Portugal Fed Cup team, she has a win–loss record of 6–11 in Billie Jean King Cup competitions as of April 2024.

Murta is currently coached by Nina Bratchikova and Pedro Pereira.

== ITF Circuit finals ==
=== Singles: 7 (1 title, 6 runner-ups) ===
Legend $25/35,000 tournaments $10/15,000 tournaments	Finals by surface Hard (1–2) Clay (0–4)

Result	W–L	Date	Tournament	Tier	Surface	Opponent	Score
Win	1–0	Sep 2016	ITF Ponta Delgada, Portugal	W10	Hard	(Portugal) Maria João Koehler	6–4, 3–6, 7–6^{(7)}
Loss	1–1	Oct 2016	ITF Porto, Portugal	W10	Clay	(Switzerland) Nina Stadler	6–2, 2–6, 3–6
Loss	1–2	Dec 2016	ITF Cairo, Egypt	W10	Clay	(Russia) Veronika Miroshnichenko	2–6, 2–6
Loss	1–3	Apr 2022	ITF Antalya, Turkey	W15	Clay	Ksenia Laskutova	3–6, 6–2, 4–6
Loss	1–4	Feb 2023	ITF Manacor, Spain	W15	Hard	(France) Nahia Berecoechea	4–6, 6–7^{(6)}
Loss	1–5	Feb 2023	ITF Manacor, Spain	W15	Hard	(Switzerland) Valentina Ryser	3–6, 3–6
Loss	1–6	Dec 2023	ITF Melilla, Spain	W15	Clay	(France) Tiantsoa Rakotomanga Rajaonah	2–6, ret.

=== Doubles: 39 (17 titles, 22 runner-ups) ===
Legend $40,000 tournaments $25,000 tournaments $10/15,000 tournaments	Finals by surface Hard (9–14) Clay (8–5) Carpet (0–3)

Result	W–L	Date	Tournament	Tier	Surface	Partner	Opponents	Score
Win	1–0	Nov 2014	ITF Casablanca, Morocco	W10	Clay	(Spain) Olga Parres Azcoitia	(Italy) Martina Caciotti (Croatia) Silvia Njirić	6–3, 6–4
Win	2–0	Mar 2015	ITF Port El Kantaoui, Tunisia	W10	Hard	(Norway) Melanie Stokke	(Romania) Mihaela Buzărnescu (Ukraine) Olena Kyrpot	6–1, 7–5
Loss	2–1	Jun 2015	ITF Sharm El Sheikh, Egypt	W10	Hard	(Republic of Ireland) Jenny Claffey	(Spain) Olga Parres Azcoitia (India) Prarthana Thombare	4–6, 2–6
Loss	2–2	Oct 2015	ITF Port El Kantaoui, Tunisia	W10	Hard	(France) Pauline Payet	(Greece) Valentini Grammatikopoulou (Ukraine) Valeriya Strakhova	7–5, 3–6, [5–10]
Loss	2–3	Nov 2015	ITF Casablanca, Morocco	W25	Clay	(France) Alice Bacquié	(Spain) Olga Parres Azcoitia (Italy) Camilla Rosatello	2–6, 4–6
Loss	2–4	Jun 2016	ITF Cantanhede, Portugal	W10	Carpet	(France) Laëtitia Sarrazin	(Portugal) Francisca Jorge (Portugal) Marta Oliveira	6–3, 3–6, [7–10]
Win	3–4	Jul 2016	ITF Amarante, Portugal	W10	Hard	(Slovakia) Tereza Mihalíková	(Switzerland) Jessica Crivelletto (Greece) Despina Papamichail	7–6^{(5)}, 6–3
Loss	3–5	Jul 2016	ITF Lisbon, Portugal	W10	Hard	(France) Mathilde Armitano	(Finland) Emma Laine (United Kingdom) Samantha Murray	6–7^{(5)}, 3–6
Loss	3–6	Aug 2016	ITF Sharm El Sheikh, Egypt	W10	Hard	(United Kingdom) Mirabelle Njoze	(India) Sharmada Balu (India) Dhruthi Tatachar	3–6, 3–6
Win	4–6	Sep 2016	ITF Ponta Delgada, Portugal	W10	Hard	(Romania) Ioana Loredana Roșca	(Germany) Katharina Hering (Cambodia) Andrea Ka	2–6, 6–4, [11–9]
Loss	4–7	Oct 2016	ITF Hammamet, Tunisia	W10	Clay	(Italy) Federica Prati	(France) Joséphine Boualem (France) Marie Témin	2–6, 4–6
Win	5–7	Dec 2016	ITF Cairo, Egypt	W10	Clay	(Chinese Taipei) Lee Pei-chi	(Germany) Lisa-Marie Mätschke (Austria) Kerstin Peckl	6–1, 6–0
Loss	5–8	Mar 2017	ITF Palma Nova, Spain	W15	Clay	(Australia) Isabelle Wallace	(Spain) Irene Burillo (Russia) Ksenija Sharifova	5–7, 3–6
Win	6–8	Jul 2017	ITF Amarante, Portugal	W15	Hard	(Spain) Alba Carrillo Marín	(Italy) Maria Masini (Spain) Olga Parres Azcoitia	7–6^{(5)}, 3–6, [13–11]
Loss	6–9	Jul 2017	ITF Cantanhede, Portugal	W15	Carpet	(France) Mathilde Armitano	(Italy) Maria Masini (Spain) Olga Parres Azcoitia	6–3, 3–6, [4–10]
Win	7–9	Oct 2017	ITF Lisbon, Portugal	W15	Hard	(Spain) Alba Carrillo Marín	(Czech Republic) Karolína Beránková (Hungary) Adrienn Nagy	4–6, 6–1, [10–4]
Win	8–9	Nov 2017	ITF Hammamet, Tunisia	W15	Clay	(Bosnia and Herzegovina) Jelena Simić	(Russia) Yulia Kulikova (Romania) Denise-Antonela Stoica	7–5, 5–7, [10–7]
Win	9–9	Jun 2018	ITF Amarante, Portugal	W15	Hard	(Spain) Alba Carillo Marin	(Romania) Karola Patricia Bejenaru (Portugal) Daniella Silva	6–4, 6–2
Loss	9–10	Sep 2018	ITF Santarém, Portugal	W15	Hard	(Italy) Maria Masini	(United States) Dasha Ivanova (United Kingdom) Samantha Murray	6–0, 1–6, [4–10]
Win	10–10	Sep 2018	ITF Montemor-o-Novo, Portugal	W15	Hard	(Switzerland) Nina Stadler	(Portugal) Francisca Jorge (Portugal) Lúcia Quitério	6–1, 6–0
Loss	10–11	Sep 2018	ITF Óbidos, Portugal	W25	Carpet	(Georgia (country)) Mariam Bolkvadze	(Poland) Katarzyna Piter (Russia) Valeria Savinykh	3–6, 2–6
Loss	10–12	Jul 2019	ITF Porto, Portugal	W25	Hard	(Sweden) Jacqueline Cabaj Awad	(France) Estelle Cascino (Bulgaria) Julia Terziyska	6–7^{(0)}, 3–6
Loss	10–13	Sep 2020	ITF Figueira da Foz, Portugal	W25	Hard	(Sweden) Jacqueline Cabaj Awad	(Brazil) Ingrid Martins (Brazil) Beatriz Haddad Maia	5–7, 1–6
Loss	10–14	Nov 2020	ITF Lousada, Portugal	W15	Hard (i)	(India) Riya Bhatia	(Netherlands) Arianne Hartono (Japan) Yuriko Miyazaki	1–6, 7–5, [7–10]
Win	11–14	Nov 2021	ITF Castellón, Spain	W15	Clay	(Greece) Sapfo Sakellaridi	(Spain) Alba Carrillo Marín (Germany) Emily Seibold	6–4, 6–4
Loss	11–15	Nov 2021	ITF Funchal, Portugal	W25	Hard	(Latvia) Daniela Vismane	(United Kingdom) Alicia Barnett (Chinese Taipei) Hsieh Yu-chieh	1–6, 6–3, [8–10]
Loss	11–16	Nov 2021	ITF Lousada, Portugal	W15	Hard (i)	(India) Vasanti Shinde	(Netherlands) Jasmijn Gimbrère (Switzerland) Naïma Karamoko	w/o
Win	12–16	Mar 2022	ITF Marrakech, Morocco	W15	Clay	(Switzerland) Naïma Karamoko	(Croatia) Lucija Ćirić Bagarić (United States) Clervie Ngounoue	6–2, 6–7^{(2)}, [10–5]
Win	13–16	Mar 2022	ITF Marrakech, Morocco	W15	Clay	(Switzerland) Naïma Karamoko	(Italy) Melania Delai (Slovenia) Pia Lovrič	6–2, 6–4
Win	14–16	May 2022	ITF Antalya, Turkey	W15	Clay	(Bulgaria) Dia Evtimova	(Japan) Rina Saigo (Japan) Yukina Saigo	6–0, 6–2
Loss	14–17	Nov 2022	ITF Castellón, Spain	W15	Clay	(Germany) Chantal Sauvant	(Germany) Laura Böhner (Spain) Noelia Bouzó Zanotti	6–7^{(3)}, 6–4, [7–10]
Win	15–17	Feb 2023	ITF Manacor, Spain	W15	Hard	(Denmark) Rebecca Munk Mortensen	(Israel) Mika Dagan Fruchtman (Israel) Shavit Kimchi	6–0, 6–3
Loss	15–18	Feb 2023	ITF Manacor, Spain	W15	Hard	(Switzerland) Naïma Karamoko	(Spain) Olga Parres Azcoitia (Romania) Ioana Loredana Roșca	4–6, 6–7^{(6)}
Loss	15–19	Nov 2023	ITF Funchal, Portugal	W40	Hard	(France) Yasmine Mansouri	Anastasia Kovaleva; Elena Pridankina	2–6, 3–6
Win	16–19	Dec 2023	ITF Valencia, Spain	W15	Hard	(Romania) Oana Georgeta Simion	(Germany) Laura Böhner (Bulgaria) Ani Vangelova	7–6^{(0)}, 6–2
Loss	16–20	Dec 2023	ITF Melilla, Spain	W15	Clay	(Spain) Olga Parres Azcoitia	(Lithuania) Patricija Paukštytė (Germany) Chantal Sauvant	4–6, 5–7
Loss	16–21	Mar 2025	ITF Sharm El Sheikh, Egypt	W15	Hard	(Germany) Franziska Sziedat	Arina Arifullina; Evgeniya Burdina	6–7^{(4)}, 6–1, [8–10]
Win	17–21	Apr 2025	ITF Monastir, Tunisia	W15	Hard	(Denmark) Rebecca Munk Mortensen	(Poland) Daria Gorska; Milana Zhabrailova	6–3, 6–1
Loss	17–22	Apr 2025	ITF Monastir, Tunisia	W15	Hard	Arina Arifullina	(United States) Annika Penickova (United States) Kristina Penickova	4–6, 4–6
