= 2025 The Campus Open =

Tennis tournament

- Date: 13–19 October 2025
- Edition: 4th
- Category: ITF Women's World Tennis Tour
- Prize money: $60,000
- Surface: Hard / Outdoor
- Location: Quinta do Lago, Portugal

Champions

Singles
- Maria Timofeeva

Doubles
- (Portugal) Francisca Jorge / (Portugal) Matilde Jorge
← 2024 ·	The Campus Open	· 2026 →

The 2025 The Campus Carby Volkswagen Ladies Open was a professional tennis tournament played on outdoor hard courts. It was the fourth edition of the tournament, which was part of the 2025 ITF Women's World Tennis Tour. It took place in Quinta do Lago, Portugal, between 13 and 19 October 2025.

== Champions ==
=== Singles ===
- Maria Timofeeva def. (United States) Alexis Blokhina, 7–6^{(9–7)}, 7–6^{(7–3)}

=== Doubles ===
- (Portugal) Francisca Jorge / (Portugal) Matilde Jorge def. (Czech Republic) Anna Sisková / Maria Timofeeva, 4–6, 7–5, [10–7]

== Singles main draw entrants ==
=== Seeds ===
Country	Player	Rank	Seed
	Maria Timofeeva	157	1
ITA	Nuria Brancaccio	158	2
BEL	Sofia Costoulas	163	3
USA	Clervie Ngounoue	179	4
CRO	Jana Fett	199	5
GER	Mona Barthel	203	6
GRE	Despina Papamichail	207	7
ITA	Tyra Caterina Grant	209	8

- Rankings are as of 6 October 2025.

=== Other entrants ===
The following players received wildcards into the singles main draw:

- (Portugal) Sara Lança
- (Portugal) Inês Murta
- (Portugal) Milla Sequeira
- (Portugal) Carla Tomai

The following players received entry from the qualifying draw:

- (United States) Carolyn Ansari
- (United States) Alexis Blokhina
- (United States) Sara Daavettila
- (Netherlands) Britt du Pree
- (France) Yasmine Mansouri
- Kira Pavlova
- (Portugal) Angelina Voloshchuk
- (Italy) Arianna Zucchini
