= 2023 Hacı Esmer Avcı Tennis Cup – Singles =

Singles
- 2023 Hacı Esmer Avcı Tennis Cup

Final
- Champion: (Argentina) María Lourdes Carlé
- Runner-up: (Romania) Irina Bara
- Score: 6–4, 6–4

Events
Singles	Doubles
Hacı Esmer Avcı Tennis Cup	· 2024 →

This was the first edition of the tournament.

María Lourdes Carlé won the title, defeating Irina Bara in the final, 6–4, 6–4.

== Seeds ==
1. (Hungary) Panna Udvardy (first round)
2. (United Kingdom) Harriet Dart (first round)
3. (Argentina) María Lourdes Carlé (champion)
4. (Latvia) Darja Semeņistaja (quarterfinals)
5. (Spain) Rosa Vicens Mas (second round)
6. (Argentina) Julia Riera (quarterfinals)
7. Maria Timofeeva (quarterfinals)
8. (Germany) Katharina Hobgarski (first round)

== Draw ==
=== Key ===
- Q = Qualifier
- WC = Wild card
- LL = Lucky loser
- Alt = Alternate
- ITF = ITF entry
- PR = Protected ranking
- SR = Special ranking
- SE = Special exempt
- JE = Junior exempt
- JR = Junior Accelerator Programme entrant
- CO = College Accelerator Programme entrant
- NG = Next Gen Accelerator Program entrant
- w/o = Walkover
- r = Retired
- d = Defaulted

=== Finals ===
Semifinals
(Romania) Andreea Prisăcariu	3	3
(Romania) Irina Bara	6	6
3	(Argentina) María Lourdes Carlé	6	6
(Turkey) Berfu Cengiz	2	4

Final
(Romania) Irina Bara	4	4
3	(Argentina) María Lourdes Carlé	6	6

=== Top half ===
First round
1	(Hungary) P Udvardy	7^{7}	3	4
(Romania) A Prisăcariu	6^{4}	6	6
LL	D Demidova	7^{7}	6
Q	(Romania) O Gavrilă	6^{3}	4
WC	A Ibragimova	4	1
Q	(Turkey) A Aksu	6	6
Q	A Anshba	6	6
8	(Germany) K Hobgarski	3	4
4	(Latvia) D Semeņistaja	6	6
Q	E Garkusha	2	2
Q	D Lodikova	6	7
(Ukraine) V Strakhova	4	5
(Romania) I Bara	6	6
WC	A Kovaleva	4	0
Q	(South Africa) I Kruger	3	0
5	(Spain) R Vicens Mas	6	6

Second round
(Romania) A Prisăcariu	4	6	7^{8}
LL	D Demidova	6	1	6^{6}
Q	(Turkey) A Aksu	5	6	4
Q	A Anshba	7	3	6
4	(Latvia) D Semeņistaja	1	6	6
Q	D Lodikova	6	0	3
(Romania) I Bara	6	6
5	(Spain) R Vicens Mas	2	0

Quarterfinals
(Romania) A Prisăcariu	2	6	7^{7}
Q	A Anshba	6	3	6^{5}
4	(Latvia) D Semeņistaja	6	5	1
(Romania) I Bara	2	7	6

Semifinals
(Romania) A Prisăcariu	3	3
(Romania) I Bara	6	6

=== Bottom half ===
First round
6	(Argentina) J Riera	6	6^{2}	6
WC	(Turkey) A Mert	0	7^{7}	1
(Turkey) Z Sönmez	7^{7}	6
(Netherlands) E Vedder	6^{5}	2
(Turkey) Ç Büyükakçay	7	6
WC	(Turkey) İ Yörük	5	4
Y Hatouka	3	1
3	(Argentina) ML Carlé	6	6
7	M Timofeeva	7	6
J Kolodynska	5	2
A Tikhonova	6	7^{7}
(United Kingdom) N Bains	2	6^{4}
(Turkey) B Cengiz	0	6	6
Q	A Ureke	6	2	3
Q	K Zaytseva	6	6
2	(United Kingdom) H Dart	3	1

Second round
6	(Argentina) J Riera	6	4	7
(Turkey) Z Sönmez	4	6	5
(Turkey) Ç Büyükakçay	6	3	3
3	(Argentina) ML Carlé	0	6	6
7	M Timofeeva	6	4	7^{7}
A Tikhonova	2	6	6^{4}
(Turkey) B Cengiz	6	6
Q	K Zaytseva	2	4

Quarterfinals
6	(Argentina) J Riera	5	5
3	(Argentina) ML Carlé	7	7
7	M Timofeeva	6	4	2
(Turkey) B Cengiz	1	6	6

Semifinals
3	(Argentina) ML Carlé	6	6
(Turkey) B Cengiz	2	4
