= 2022 Nur-Sultan International Tournament =

Tennis tournament

- Date: 21–27 February 2022
- Edition: 1st (women)
- Category: ITF Women's World Tennis Tour
- Prize money: $60,000
- Surface: Hard (indoor)
- Location: Nur-Sultan, Kazakhstan

Champions

Singles
- (Russia) Anzhelika Isaeva

Doubles
- (Russia) Ekaterina Makarova / (Czech Republic) Linda Nosková
- Nur-Sultan Challenger

The 2022 Nur-Sultan International Tournament was a professional tennis tournament played on indoor hard courts. It was the first edition of the women's tournament which was part of the 2022 ITF Women's World Tennis Tour. It took place in Nur-Sultan, Kazakhstan between 21 and 27 February 2022.

== Singles main-draw entrants ==
=== Seeds ===
Country	Player	Rank^{1}	Seed
BEL	Greet Minnen	91	1
ESP	Aliona Bolsova	167	2
GEO	Mariam Bolkvadze	168	3
BLR	Yuliya Hatouka	180	4
JPN	Kurumi Nara	199	5
RUS	Valeria Savinykh	200	6
BEL	Ysaline Bonaventure	210	7
RUS	Anastasia Zakharova	230	8

- ^{1} Rankings are as of 14 February 2022.

=== Other entrants ===
The following players received wildcards into the singles main draw:

- (Kazakhstan) Gozal Ainitdinova
- (Kazakhstan) Yekaterina Dmitrichenko
- (Kazakhstan) Zhibek Kulambayeva
- (Kazakhstan) Aruzhan Sagandikova

The following player received entry using a protected ranking:

- (Liechtenstein) Kathinka von Deichmann

The following players received entry from the qualifying draw:

- (Turkey) Berfu Cengiz
- (Japan) Nagi Hanatani
- (Russia) Anzhelika Isaeva
- (Poland) Martyna Kubka
- (Russia) Polina Kudermetova
- (Russia) Ekaterina Reyngold
- (Russia) Maria Timofeeva
- (Russia) Ekaterina Yashina

== Champions ==
=== Singles ===
- (Russia) Anzhelika Isaeva def. (Belgium) Greet Minnen, 6–4, 0–0, ret.

=== Doubles ===
- (Russia) Ekaterina Makarova / (Czech Republic) Linda Nosková def. (Czech Republic) Anna Sisková / (Russia) Maria Timofeeva, 6–2, 6–3
