= 2026 İstanbul Open – Doubles =

Doubles
- 2026 İstanbul Open

Final
- Champions: Maria Kozyreva (Brazil) Laura Pigossi
- Runners-up: (Czech Republic) Anastasia Dețiuc (Japan) Makoto Ninomiya
- Score: 6–4, 4–6, [10–7]

Events
Singles	Doubles
- İstanbul Open

Maria Kozyreva and Laura Pigossi won the title, defeating Anastasia Dețiuc and Makoto Ninomiya 6–4, 4–6, [10–7] in the final .

This was the first edition of this WTA 125 tournament.

== Seeds ==
1. (Australia) Storm Hunter / (New Zealand) Erin Routliffe (quarterfinals)
2. (Czech Republic) Anastasia Dețiuc / (Japan) Makoto Ninomiya (final)
3. (Netherlands) Isabelle Haverlag / (United Kingdom) Maia Lumsden (semifinals)
4. Maria Kozyreva / (Brazil) Laura Pigossi (champions)

== Draw ==
Key

- Q = Qualifier
- WC = Wild card
- LL = Lucky loser
- Alt = Alternate
- ITF = ITF entry
- PR = Protected ranking
- SR = Special ranking
- SE = Special exempt
- JE = Junior exempt
- JR = Junior Accelerator Programme entrant
- CO = College Accelerator Programme entrant
- NG = Next Gen Accelerator Program entrant
- w/o = Walkover
- r = Retired
- d = Defaulted

=== Draw ===
First round
1	(Australia) S Hunter (New Zealand) E Routliffe	7	6
(Romania) I Bara (France) C Monnet	5	4
(Slovenia) D Jakupović (Slovenia) N Radišić	6	6
Alt	(Romania) MS Popa (Serbia) M Ristić	4	1
4	M Kozyreva (Brazil) L Pigossi	w/o
E Pridankina (China) Q Tang
(Canada) K Sebov (Cyprus) R Șerban	1	6	[10]
A Falei; P Iatcenko	6	4	[8]
(Uzbekistan) P Kudermetova (Uzbekistan) M Timofeeva	6	7^{9}
WC	(Turkey) A Aksu (Turkey) Ç Büyükakçay	3	6^{7}
(United Kingdom) A Barnett (China) S Feng	6	4	[5]
3	(Netherlands) I Haverlag (United Kingdom) M Lumsden	3	6	[10]
(Croatia) M Dražić; A Gasanova	2	0
(United Kingdom) M Brooks (France) T Rakotomanga Rajaonah	6	6
(Chinese Taipei) I-h Cho (Chinese Taipei) Y-t Cho	0	6	[8]
2	(Czech Republic) A Dețiuc (Japan) M Ninomiya	6	3	[10]

Quarterfinals
1	(Australia) S Hunter (New Zealand) E Routliffe	5	2
(Slovenia) D Jakupović (Slovenia) N Radišić	7	6
4	M Kozyreva (Brazil) L Pigossi	7	6
(Canada) K Sebov (Cyprus) R Șerban	5	0
(Uzbekistan) P Kudermetova (Uzbekistan) M Timofeeva
3	(Netherlands) I Haverlag (United Kingdom) M Lumsden	w/o
(United Kingdom) M Brooks (France) T Rakotomanga Rajaonah	4	6^{4}
2	(Czech Republic) A Dețiuc (Japan) M Ninomiya	6	7^{7}

Semifinals
(Slovenia) D Jakupović (Slovenia) N Radišić	3	5
4	M Kozyreva (Brazil) L Pigossi	6	7
3	(Netherlands) I Haverlag (United Kingdom) M Lumsden	6	2	[9]
2	(Czech Republic) A Dețiuc (Japan) M Ninomiya	3	6	[11]

Final
4	M Kozyreva (Brazil) L Pigossi	6	4	[10]
2	(Czech Republic) A Dețiuc (Japan) M Ninomiya	4	6	[7]
