= 2023 Hacı Esmer Avcı Tennis Cup =

Tennis tournament

- Date: 15–21 May 2023
- Edition: 1st
- Category: ITF Women's World Tennis Tour
- Prize money: $60,000
- Surface: Clay / Outdoor
- Location: Bodrum, Turkey

Champions

Singles
- (Argentina) María Lourdes Carlé

Doubles
- (Romania) Oana Gavrilă / (Netherlands) Isabelle Haverlag
Hacı Esmer Avcı Tennis Cup	· 2024 →

The 2023 Hacı Esmer Avcı Tennis Cup was a professional tennis tournament played on outdoor clay courts. It was the first edition of the tournament, which was part of the 2023 ITF Women's World Tennis Tour. It took place in Bodrum, Turkey, between 15 and 21 May 2023.

== Champions ==
=== Singles ===
- (Argentina) María Lourdes Carlé def. (Romania) Irina Bara, 6–4, 6–4

=== Doubles ===
- (Romania) Oana Gavrilă / (Netherlands) Isabelle Haverlag def. (Turkey) Ayla Aksu / (United Kingdom) Harriet Dart, 6–4, 7–6^{(7–3)}

== Singles main draw entrants ==
=== Seeds ===
Country	Player	Rank	Seed
HUN	Panna Udvardy	92	1
GBR	Harriet Dart	139	2
ARG	María Lourdes Carlé	163	3
LAT	Darja Semeņistaja	182	4
ESP	Rosa Vicens Mas	185	5
ARG	Julia Riera	193	6
	Maria Timofeeva	217	7
GER	Katharina Hobgarski	220	8

- Rankings are as of 8 May 2023.

=== Other entrants ===
The following players received wildcards into the singles main draw:

- Alevtina Ibragimova
- Anastasia Kovaleva
- (Turkey) Ayşegül Mert
- (Turkey) İlay Yörük

The following players received entry from the qualifying draw:

- (Turkey) Ayla Aksu
- Amina Anshba
- Eva Garkusha
- (Romania) Oana Gavrilă
- (South Africa) Isabella Kruger
- Daria Lodikova
- Anna Ureke
- Ksenia Zaytseva

The following player received entry as a lucky loser:

- Diana Demidova
