= 2022 Nur-Sultan International Tournament – Singles =

2022 tennis event results

Singles
- 2022 Nur-Sultan International Tournament

Final
- Champion: (Russia) Anzhelika Isaeva
- Runner-up: (Belgium) Greet Minnen
- Score: 6–4, 0–0, ret.

Events
Singles	Doubles
Nur-Sultan Challenger	· 2023 →

This was the first edition of the women's event.

Qualifier Anzhelika Isaeva won her first pro title, defeating top seed Greet Minnen after the latter retired in the final after the first set.

== Seeds ==
1. (Belgium) Greet Minnen (final, retired)
2. (Spain) Aliona Bolsova (quarterfinals)
3. (Georgia (country)) Mariam Bolkvadze (second round)
4. (Belarus) Yuliya Hatouka (first round)
5. (Japan) Kurumi Nara (quarterfinals)
6. (Russia) Valeria Savinykh (quarterfinals)
7. (Belgium) Ysaline Bonaventure (semifinals)
8. (Russia) Anastasia Zakharova (semifinals)

== Draw ==
=== Key ===
- Q = Qualifier
- WC = Wild card
- LL = Lucky loser
- Alt = Alternate
- SE = Special exempt
- PR = Protected ranking
- ITF = ITF entry
- JE = Junior exempt
- w/o = Walkover
- r = Retired
- d = Defaulted
- SR = Special ranking

=== Finals ===
Semifinals
1	(Belgium) Greet Minnen	6	7
8	(Russia) Anastasia Zakharova	3	5
Q	(Russia) Anzhelika Isaeva	7	4	6
7	(Belgium) Ysaline Bonaventure	5	6	2

Final
1	(Belgium) Greet Minnen	4	0^{r}
Q	(Russia) Anzhelika Isaeva	6	0

=== Top half ===
First round
1	(Belgium) G Minnen	6	6
(Belarus) A Kubareva	3	4
(Czech Republic) L Nosková	6	6
(India) A Raina	4	0
Q	(Russia) P Kudermetova	7	7
Q	(Russia) E Yashina	5	5
Q	(Russia) E Reyngold	1	6	4
6	(Russia) V Savinykh	6	2	6
4	(Belarus) Y Hatouka	2	5
PR	(Liechtenstein) K von Deichmann	6	7
(Latvia) D Marcinkēviča	6^{4}	1
(Germany) E Lys	7^{7}	6
(Czech Republic) A Sisková	6	7
(Uzbekistan) N Abduraimova	3	5
Q	(Turkey) B Cengiz	2	3
8	(Russia) A Zakharova	6	6

Second round
1	(Belgium) G Minnen	6	6
(Czech Republic) L Nosková	3	3
Q	(Russia) P Kudermetova	3	6	3
6	(Russia) V Savinykh	6	2	6
PR	(Liechtenstein) K von Deichmann	4	4
(Germany) E Lys	6	6
(Czech Republic) A Sisková	5	1
8	(Russia) A Zakharova	7	6

Quarterfinals
1	(Belgium) G Minnen	6	6
6	(Russia) V Savinykh	1	4
(Germany) E Lys	6	1	4
8	(Russia) A Zakharova	3	6	6

Semifinals
1	(Belgium) G Minnen	6	7
8	(Russia) A Zakharova	3	5

=== Bottom half ===
First round
5	(Japan) K Nara	6	6
WC	(Kazakhstan) Y Dmitrichenko	4	0
(South Korea) S-h Park	2	1^{r}
Q	(Russia) M Timofeeva	6	4
Q	(Russia) A Isaeva	6	5	6
(Russia) D Astakhova	0	7	4
WC	(Kazakhstan) G Ainitdinova	3	1
3	(Georgia (country)) M Bolkvadze	6	6
7	(Belgium) Y Bonaventure	6	6
WC	(Kazakhstan) A Sagandikova	2	0
Q	(Japan) N Hanatani	6	1	2
(Russia) N Vikhlyantseva	3	6	6
WC	(Kazakhstan) Z Kulambayeva	6	6^{5}	3
(Russia) E Kazionova	1	7^{7}	6
Q	(Poland) M Kubka	1	1
2	(Spain) A Bolsova	6	6

Second round
5	(Japan) K Nara	6	6
Q	(Russia) M Timofeeva	3	4
Q	(Russia) A Isaeva	2	6	6
3	(Georgia (country)) M Bolkvadze	6	2	3
7	(Belgium) Y Bonaventure	6	6
(Russia) N Vikhlyantseva	2	4
(Russia) E Kazionova	3	5
2	(Spain) A Bolsova	6	7

Quarterfinals
5	(Japan) K Nara	4	3
Q	(Russia) A Isaeva	6	6
7	(Belgium) Y Bonaventure	6	6
2	(Spain) A Bolsova	3	3

Semifinals
Q	(Russia) A Isaeva	7	4	6
7	(Belgium) Y Bonaventure	5	6	2
