= 2023 Hacı Esmer Avcı Tennis Cup – Doubles =

Doubles
- 2023 Hacı Esmer Avcı Tennis Cup

Final
- Champions: (Romania) Oana Gavrilă (Netherlands) Isabelle Haverlag
- Runners-up: (Turkey) Ayla Aksu (United Kingdom) Harriet Dart
- Score: 6–4, 7–6^{(7–3)}

Events
Singles	Doubles
Hacı Esmer Avcı Tennis Cup	· 2024 →

This was the first edition of the tournament.

Oana Gavrilă and Isabelle Haverlag won the title, defeating Ayla Aksu and Harriet Dart in the final, 6–4, 7–6^{(7–3)}.

== Seeds ==
1. Amina Anshba / Anastasia Tikhonova (semifinals, withdrew)
2. (United Kingdom) Naiktha Bains / (United Kingdom) Maia Lumsden (first round)
3. (Romania) Oana Gavrilă / (Netherlands) Isabelle Haverlag (champions)
4. (Turkey) Ayla Aksu / (United Kingdom) Harriet Dart (final)

== Draw ==
=== Key ===
- Q = Qualifier
- WC = Wild card
- LL = Lucky loser
- Alt = Alternate
- ITF = ITF entry
- PR = Protected ranking
- SR = Special ranking
- SE = Special exempt
- JE = Junior exempt
- JR = Junior Accelerator Programme entrant
- CO = College Accelerator Programme entrant
- NG = Next Gen Accelerator Program entrant
- w/o = Walkover
- r = Retired
- d = Defaulted

First round
(Argentina) J Riera (Netherlands) L Stevens	6^{1}	7	[10]
(Turkey) A Mert (Serbia) T Sretenović	7^{7}	5	[3]
4	(Turkey) A Aksu (United Kingdom) H Dart	6	6
(Turkey) S Atay (Turkey) M Sezer	1	3
WC	E Shalimova (Turkey) İ Yörük	3	3
A Ureke; K Zaytseva	6	6
D Lodikova (Sweden) F Östlund	6	6
(Bulgaria) B Spasova (Romania) M Toma	1	4
A Ibragimova; A Kovaleva	2	3
3	(Romania) O Gavrilă (Netherlands) I Haverlag	6	6
(Germany) L Böhner (Romania) A Prisăcariu	7	7^{7}
E Garkusha (Turkey) MA Uyar	5	6^{5}
Y Hatouka; J Kolodynska	6	6^{6}	[10]
2	(United Kingdom) N Bains (United Kingdom) M Lumsden	1	7^{8}	[6]

Quarterfinals
1	A Anshba; A Tikhonova	6	7
(Argentina) J Riera (Netherlands) L Stevens	2	5
4	(Turkey) A Aksu (United Kingdom) H Dart	6	6
A Ureke; K Zaytseva	3	2
D Lodikova (Sweden) F Östlund	3	5
3	(Romania) O Gavrilă (Netherlands) I Haverlag	6	7
(Germany) L Böhner (Romania) A Prisăcariu	3	3
Y Hatouka; J Kolodynska	6	6

Semifinals
1	A Anshba; A Tikhonova
4	(Turkey) A Aksu (United Kingdom) H Dart	w/o
3	(Romania) O Gavrilă (Netherlands) I Haverlag	2	6	[10]
Y Hatouka; J Kolodynska	6	3	[3]

Final
4	(Turkey) A Aksu (United Kingdom) H Dart	4	6^{3}
3	(Romania) O Gavrilă (Netherlands) I Haverlag	6	7^{7}
