= Hacı Esmer Avcı Tennis Cup =

- 2023 Hacı Esmer Avcı Tennis Cup

ITF Women's Tour
- Event name: Hacı Esmer Avcı Tennis Cup
- Location: Bodrum, Turkey
- Venue: Vogue Hotel Supreme
- Category: ITF Women's World Tennis Tour
- Surface: Clay
- Draw: 32S/32Q/16D
- Prize money: $60,000

The Hacı Esmer Avcı Tennis Cup is a tournament for professional female tennis players played on outdoor clay courts. The event is classified as a $60,000 ITF Women's World Tennis Tour tournament and has been held in Bodrum, Turkey, since 2023.

== Past finals ==
=== Singles ===
Year	Champion	Runner-up	Score
2023	(Argentina) María Lourdes Carlé	(Romania) Irina Bara	6–4, 6–4

=== Doubles ===
Year	Champions	Runners-up	Score
2023	(Romania) Oana Gavrilă (Netherlands) Isabelle Haverlag	(Turkey) Ayla Aksu (United Kingdom) Harriet Dart	6–4, 7–6^{(7–3)}
