= İstanbul Open =

- 2026 İstanbul Open

WTA 125
- Event name: İstanbul Open
- Location: İstinye / Istanbul, Turkey
- Venue: TTF Istanbul Tennis Training Center (TTF İstanbul Tenis Merkezi)
- Category: WTA 125
- Surface: Clay
- Draw: 32S/11Q/16D
- Prize money: $115,000
- Website: website

Current champions (2026)
- Singles: (Uzbekistan) Maria Timofeeva
- Doubles: Maria Kozyreva (Brazil) Laura Pigossi

The İstanbul Open is a tournament for professional female tennis players played on outdoor clay courts. The event is classified as a WTA 125 tournament and is held at the TTF İstanbul Tenis Merkezi in İstinye, Istanbul, Turkey.

== Past finals ==
=== Singles ===
Year	Champion	Runners-up	Score
2026	(Uzbekistan) Maria Timofeeva	(Croatia) Donna Vekić	6–4, 6–2

=== Doubles ===
Year	Champions	Runners-up	Score
2026	Maria Kozyreva (Brazil) Laura Pigossi	(Czech Republic) Anastasia Dețiuc (Japan) Makoto Ninomiya	6–4, 4–6, [10–7]

== See also ==
- İstanbul Cup, WTA 250 event
- Istanbul Open, ATP 250 event
- Bosphorus Challenger Cup, ATP Challenger event, held also in İstinye at the same venue in May
