= 2022 Nur-Sultan International Tournament – Doubles =

2022 tennis event results

Doubles
- 2022 Nur-Sultan International Tournament

Final
- Champions: (Russia) Ekaterina Makarova (Czech Republic) Linda Nosková
- Runners-up: (Czech Republic) Anna Sisková (Russia) Maria Timofeeva
- Score: 6–2, 6–3

Events
Singles	Doubles
- Nur-Sultan Challenger

This was the first edition of the women's event.

Ekaterina Makarova and Linda Nosková won the title, defeating Anna Sisková and Maria Timofeeva in the final, 6–2, 6–3.

== Seeds ==
1. (Spain) Aliona Bolsova / (Belgium) Greet Minnen (quarterfinals)
2. (Russia) Angelina Gabueva / (Russia) Anastasia Zakharova (first round)
3. (Georgia (country)) Mariam Bolkvadze / (Russia) Ekaterina Yashina (first round)
4. (India) Rutuja Bhosale / (India) Ankita Raina (first round)

== Draw ==
Key

- Q = Qualifier
- WC = Wild card
- LL = Lucky loser
- Alt = Alternate
- ITF = ITF entry
- PR = Protected ranking
- SR = Special ranking
- SE = Special exempt
- JE = Junior exempt
- JR = Junior Accelerator Programme entrant
- CO = College Accelerator Programme entrant
- NG = Next Gen Accelerator Program entrant
- w/o = Walkover
- r = Retired
- d = Defaulted

=== Draw ===
First round
1	(Spain) A Bolsova (Belgium) G Minnen	3	6	[10]
(Russia) V Savinykh (Japan) M Uchijima	6	4	[7]
(Belarus) Y Hatouka (Latvia) D Marcinkēviča	3	7	[12]
(Belgium) Y Bonaventure (Ukraine) V Strakhova	6	5	[14]
4	(India) R Bhosale (India) A Raina	2	4
(Belarus) A Kubareva (Sweden) F Östlund	6	6
WC	(Kazakhstan) G Ainitdinova (Kazakhstan) Y Dmitrichenko	6	1	[6]
(Russia) E Makarova (Czech Republic) L Nosková	4	6	[10]
WC	(Kazakhstan) S Kenzhibayeva (Kazakhstan) A Sagandikova	1	0
(Turkey) B Cengiz (Russia) E Reyngold	6	6
(Czech Republic) A Sisková (Russia) M Timofeeva	7	3	[10]
3	(Georgia (country)) M Bolkvadze (Russia) E Yashina	5	6	[8]
WC	(Kazakhstan) S Chursina (Hong Kong) K-y Ng	5	2
(Poland) M Kubka (Kazakhstan) Z Kulambayeva	7	6
(Uzbekistan) N Abduraimova (Uzbekistan) A Amanmuradova	5	6	[10]
2	(Russia) A Gabueva (Russia) A Zakharova	7	3	[8]

Quarterfinals
1	(Spain) A Bolsova (Belgium) G Minnen	5	6	[6]
(Belgium) Y Bonaventure (Ukraine) V Strakhova	7	4	[10]
(Belarus) A Kubareva (Sweden) F Östlund	3	3
(Russia) E Makarova (Czech Republic) L Nosková	6	6
(Turkey) B Cengiz (Russia) E Reyngold	6	4	[8]
(Czech Republic) A Sisková (Russia) M Timofeeva	3	6	[10]
(Poland) M Kubka (Kazakhstan) Z Kulambayeva	6^{7}	6^{5}
(Uzbekistan) N Abduraimova (Uzbekistan) A Amanmuradova	7^{9}	7^{7}

Semifinals
(Belgium) Y Bonaventure (Ukraine) V Strakhova	1	4
(Russia) E Makarova (Czech Republic) L Nosková	6	6
(Czech Republic) A Sisková (Russia) M Timofeeva	7^{7}	7^{13}
(Uzbekistan) N Abduraimova (Uzbekistan) A Amanmuradova	6^{3}	6^{11}

Final
(Russia) E Makarova (Czech Republic) L Nosková	6	6
(Czech Republic) A Sisková (Russia) M Timofeeva	2	3
