= Anzhelika Isaeva =

Russian tennis player

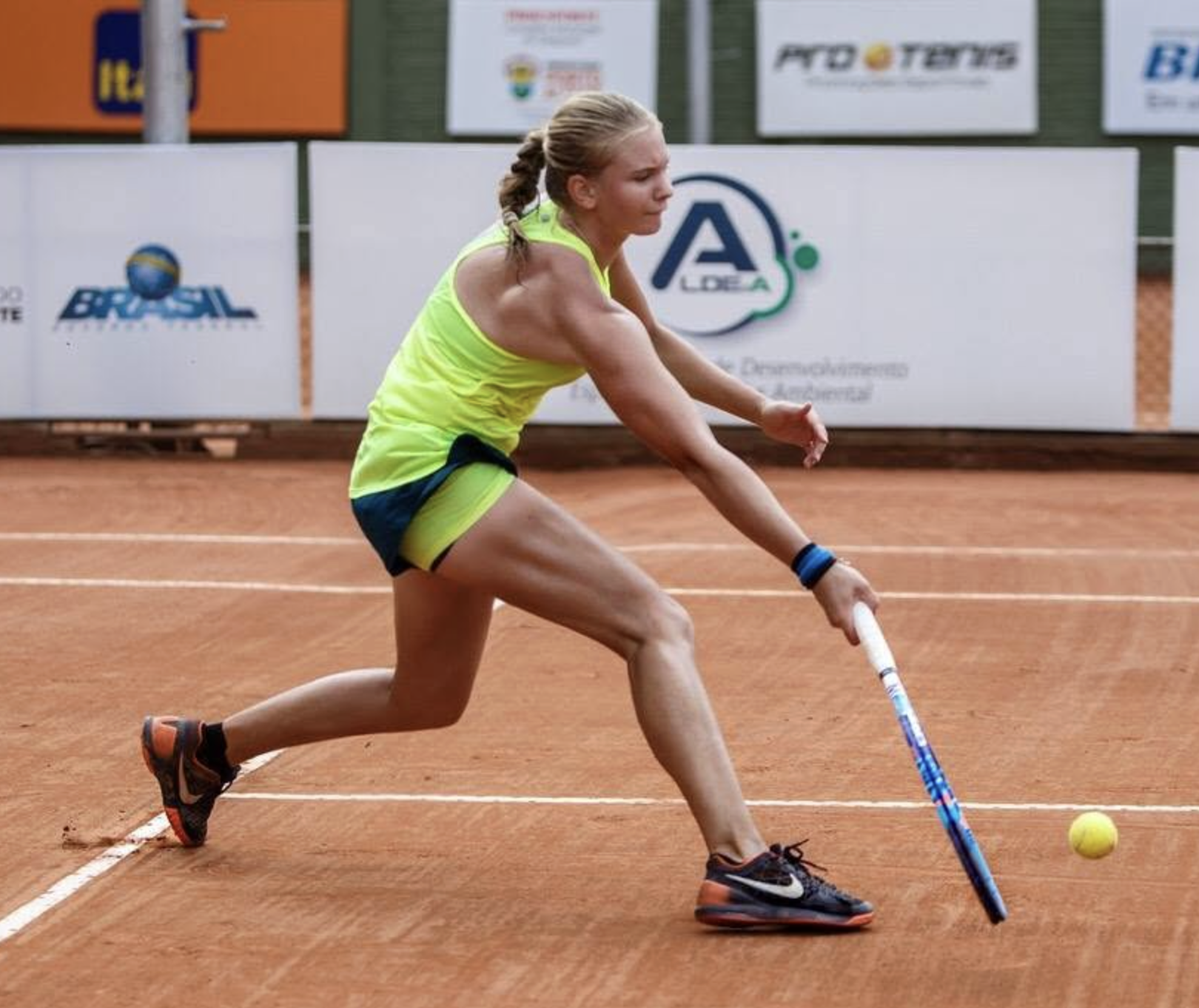
- Full name: Anzhelika Albertovna Isaeva
- Native name: Анжелика Исаева
- Country (sports): Russia
- Residence: Los Angeles, California, US
- Born: 20 November 2000 (age 25) Yekaterinburg, Russia
- Height: 175 cm (5 ft 9 in)
- Turned pro: 2014
- Plays: Right (two-handed backhand)
- Prize money: $39,658

Singles
- Career record: 122–106
- Career titles: 1 ITF
- Highest ranking: No. 374 (25 April 2022)

Doubles
- Career record: 29–39
- Career titles: 1 ITF
- Highest ranking: No. 760 (4 April 2022)

Anzhelika Albertovna Isaeva (Russian: Анжелика Альбертовна Исаева; born 20 November 2000) is a Russian former tennis player. Across her career, she has claimed numerous national and international titles across different ages and categories. As a junior, she reportedly reached a U12 No. 1 ranking in Ukraine and was ranked amongst the top 3 juniors in Russia. At 15 years old, she was awarded the title of Master of Sports of Russia, a national sports qualification recognizing elite-level athletic achievement and was a member of the Russian national tennis team. She achieved a career-high ITF junior world ranking of No. 35 at the age of 16. She competed in the draws of multiple junior Grand Slam tournaments, singles and doubles. She was named Best Tennis Newcomer of the Year in 2022. Her career-high win came against a world No. 24-ranked player. Isaeva has a best singles ranking by the WTA of 374, achieved on 25 April 2022.

Isaeva won her biggest title at the 2022 Nur-Sultan Challenger, where she defeated Greet Minnen who would go on to reach a career-high ranking of world No. 59.

== ITF Circuit finals ==
Legend
W60 tournaments
W25 tournaments
W15 tournaments
10k tournaments

=== Singles: 3 (1 title, 2 runner-ups) ===
Result	W–L	Date	Tournament	Tier	Surface	Opponent	Score
Loss	0–1	Aug 2016	ITF Sharm El Sheikh, Egypt	10k	Hard	(Romania) Ioana Pietroiu	2–6, 4–6
Loss	0–2	Jun 2021	ITF Vilnius, Lithuania	W15	Hard	(Bosnia and Herzegovina) Dea Herdželaš	2–6, 0–4 ret.
Win	1–2	Feb 2022	Nur-Sultan Challenger, Kazakhstan	W60	Hard (i)	(Belgium) Greet Minnen	6–4, ret.

=== Doubles: 1 (title) ===
Result	Date	Tournament	Tier	Surface	Partner	Opponents	Score
Win	Apr 2021	ITF Shymkent, Kazakhstan	W15	Clay	(Russia) Ekaterina Makarova	(Uzbekistan) Sabina Sharipova (Russia) Ekaterina Yashina	7–6^{(4)}, 6–3
