= 2026 İstanbul Open – Singles =

Singles
- 2026 İstanbul Open

Final
- Champion: (Uzbekistan) Maria Timofeeva
- Runner-up: (Croatia) Donna Vekić
- Score: 6–4, 6–2

Details
- Draw: 32 (4Q / 3WC)
- Seeds: 8

Events
Singles	Doubles
- İstanbul Open

This was the first edition of the WTA 125 tournament.

Maria Timofeeva won the title, defeating Donna Vekić 6–4, 6–2 in the final.

== Seeds ==
1. (Croatia) Donna Vekić (final)
2. (United Kingdom) Francesca Jones (quarterfinals)
3. (Uzbekistan) Polina Kudermetova (quarterfinals)
4. (Czech Republic) Linda Fruhvirtová (second round)
5. (Belgium) Sofia Costoulas (first round, retired)
6. (Uzbekistan) Maria Timofeeva (champion)
7. (France) Tiantsoa Rakotomanga Rajaonah (first round)
8. (Netherlands) Anouk Koevermans (first round)

== Draw ==
Key

- Q = Qualifier
- WC = Wild card
- LL = Lucky loser
- Alt = Alternate
- ITF = ITF entry
- PR = Protected ranking
- SR = Special ranking
- SE = Special exempt
- JE = Junior exempt
- JR = Junior Accelerator Programme entrant
- CO = College Accelerator Programme entrant
- NG = Next Gen Accelerator Program entrant
- w/o = Walkover
- r = Retired
- d = Defaulted

=== Finals ===
Semifinals
1	(Croatia) Donna Vekić	6	6
(Spain) Guiomar Maristany	4	3
PR	(France) Alice Tubello	4	6	0
6	(Uzbekistan) Maria Timofeeva	6	4	6

Final
1	(Croatia) Donna Vekić	4	2
6	(Uzbekistan) Maria Timofeeva	6	6

=== Top half ===
First round
1	(Croatia) D Vekić	6	6^{3}	6
A Falei	2	7^{7}	4
Q	(Canada) K Sebov	4	6	0
(Turkey) B Cengiz	6	1	6
(North Macedonia) L Gjorcheska	4	6	4
WC	(China) X Sun	6	4	6
LL	(Serbia) M Ristić	2	5
5	(Belgium) S Costoulas	6	5^{r}
4	(Czech Republic) L Fruhvirtová	6	7
Q	(Czech Republic) T Martincová	0	5
(Brazil) L Pigossi	6	3	6
Q	(Spain) L Cortez Llorca	3	6	3
P Iatcenko	4	1
(Australia) S Hunter	6	6
(Spain) G Maristany	7	6
8	(Netherlands) A Koevermans	5	3

Second round
1	(Croatia) D Vekić	6	6
(Turkey) B Cengiz	2	4
WC	(China) X Sun	2	1
LL	(Serbia) M Ristić	6	6
4	(Czech Republic) L Fruhvirtová	6^{2}	7	2
(Brazil) L Pigossi	7^{7}	5	6
(Australia) S Hunter	2	7^{7}	1
(Spain) G Maristany	6	6^{4}	6

Quarterfinals
1	(Croatia) D Vekić	6	6
LL	(Serbia) M Ristić	1	0
(Brazil) L Pigossi	0	2
(Spain) G Maristany	6	6

Semifinals
1	(Croatia) D Vekić	6	6
(Spain) G Maristany	4	3

=== Bottom half ===
First round
7	(France) T Rakotomanga Rajaonah	0	7	6^{2}
PR	(France) A Tubello	6	5	7^{7}
(Bulgaria) E Yaneva	6	6
WC	(Turkey) A Aksu	4	1
A Gasanova	7^{7}	6
(China) H Guo	6^{3}	2
WC	(Turkey) Ç Büyükakçay	3	1
3	(Uzbekistan) P Kudermetova	6	6
6	(Uzbekistan) M Timofeeva	6	6
(Germany) N Noha Akugue	4	3
PR	(Montenegro) D Kovinić	5	1
WC	(Latvia) A Lachinova	7	6
Q	(Romania) MS Popa	4	6^{3}
(France) C Monnet	6	7^{7}
(Georgia (country)) E Gorgodze	4	2
2	(United Kingdom) F Jones	6	6

Second round
PR	(France) A Tubello	6	6
(Bulgaria) E Yaneva	1	1
A Gasanova	6	5	5
3	(Uzbekistan) P Kudermetova	3	7	7
6	(Uzbekistan) M Timofeeva	6	6
WC	(Latvia) A Lachinova	4	3
(France) C Monnet	2	6	2
2	(United Kingdom) F Jones	6	3	6

Quarterfinals
PR	(France) A Tubello	4	6	6
3	(Uzbekistan) P Kudermetova	6	2	4
6	(Uzbekistan) M Timofeeva	7^{7}	6
2	(United Kingdom) F Jones	6^{2}	3

Semifinals
PR	(France) A Tubello	4	6	0
6	(Uzbekistan) M Timofeeva	6	4	6

== Qualifying ==
=== Seeds ===
1. (Canada) Katherine Sebov (qualified)
2. (Czech Republic) Tereza Martincová (qualified)
3. (Serbia) Mia Ristić (qualifying competition, lucky loser)
4. (Cyprus) Raluca Șerban (qualifying competition)
5. (Slovenia) Dalila Jakupović (qualifying competition)
6. (Bulgaria) Isabella Shinikova (qualifying competition)
7. (Spain) Lucía Cortez Llorca (qualified)
8. (Romania) Maria Sara Popa (qualified)

=== Qualifiers ===
1. (Canada) Katherine Sebov
2. (Czech Republic) Tereza Martincová
3. (Spain) Lucía Cortez Llorca
4. (Romania) Maria Sara Popa

=== Lucky loser ===
1. (Serbia) Mia Ristić

=== Qualifying draw ===
==== First qualifier ====
Qualifying competition
1	(Canada) Katherine Sebov	7	6
5	(Slovenia) Dalila Jakupović	5	3

==== Second qualifier ====
First round				Qualifying competition
				2	(Czech Republic) Tereza Martincová	6	3	6
				6	(Bulgaria) Isabella Shinikova	3	6	4
WC	(Turkey) Minel Naz Kaynak	1	4	6	(Bulgaria) Isabella Shinikova	3	6	4
6	(Bulgaria) Isabella Shinikova	6	6

==== Third qualifier ====
First round				Qualifying competition
				3	(Serbia) Mia Ristić	6^{2}	7^{7}	4
				7	(Spain) Lucía Cortez Llorca	7^{7}	6^{5}	6
WC	(Turkey) Sude Ulueren	0	0	7	(Spain) Lucía Cortez Llorca	7^{7}	6^{5}	6
7	(Spain) Lucía Cortez Llorca	6	6

==== Fourth qualifier ====
First round				Qualifying competition
				4	(Cyprus) Raluca Șerban	5	6	4
				8	(Romania) Maria Sara Popa	7	3	6
WC	(Turkey) Defne Çırpanlı	1	3	8	(Romania) Maria Sara Popa	7	3	6
8	(Romania) Maria Sara Popa	6	6
