= 2025 The Campus Open – Doubles =

Doubles
- 2025 The Campus Open

Final
- Champions: (Portugal) Francisca Jorge (Portugal) Matilde Jorge
- Runners-up: (Czech Republic) Anna Sisková; Maria Timofeeva
- Score: 4–6, 7–5, [10–7]

Events
Singles	Doubles
← 2024 ·	The Campus Open	· 2026 →

Francisca and Matilde Jorge won the title, defeating Anna Sisková and Maria Timofeeva 4–6, 7–5, [10–7] in the final.

Matilde Jorge and Justina Mikulskytė were the defending champions, but Mikulskytė chose to compete in Les Franqueses del Vallès instead.

== Seeds ==
1. (Portugal) Francisca Jorge / (Portugal) Matilde Jorge (champions)
2. (Czech Republic) Michaela Bayerlová / (Netherlands) Lian Tran (first round)
3. (Italy) Silvia Ambrosio / (Italy) Aurora Zantedeschi (first round)
4. (Czech Republic) Anna Sisková / Maria Timofeeva (final)

== Draw ==
Key

- Q = Qualifier
- WC = Wild card
- LL = Lucky loser
- Alt = Alternate
- ITF = ITF entry
- PR = Protected ranking
- SR = Special ranking
- SE = Special exempt
- JE = Junior exempt
- JR = Junior Accelerator Programme entrant
- CO = College Accelerator Programme entrant
- NG = Next Gen Accelerator Program entrant
- w/o = Walkover
- r = Retired
- d = Defaulted

=== Draw ===
First round
(United States) C Ansari (Netherlands) S Visscher	7	6
(United States) S Daavettila (Ukraine) P Isakova	5	1
3	(Italy) S Ambrosio (Italy) A Zantedeschi	6	4	[12]
(Lithuania) I Dapkutė (Romania) B Szabó	2	6	[14]
WC	(United States) B Brown (United States) J Snells	6	3	[11]
(Portugal) I Murta (India) V Shinde	4	6	[13]
(Portugal) T Franco Dias (Portugal) S Lança	6	4	[10]
(Portugal) M Matias (Portugal) C Tomai	3	6	[3]
K Pavlova; M Zhabrailova	3	6^{11}
4	(Czech Republic) A Sisková; M Timofeeva	6	7^{13}
(Latvia) D Marcinkēviča (Czech Republic) I Šebestová	1	6	[6]
(Netherlands) B du Pree (Netherlands) S van Emst	6	2	[10]
(Portugal) AF Santos (Latvia) E Tomase	7	7^{7}
2	(Czech Republic) M Bayerlová (Netherlands) L Tran	5	6^{4}

Quarterfinals
1	(Portugal) F Jorge (Portugal) M Jorge	6	7^{7}
(United States) C Ansari (Netherlands) S Visscher	2	6^{4}
(Lithuania) I Dapkutė (Romania) B Szabó	4	6	[10]
(Portugal) I Murta (India) V Shinde	6	4	[4]
(Portugal) T Franco Dias (Portugal) S Lança	1	0
4	(Czech Republic) A Sisková; M Timofeeva	6	6
(Netherlands) B du Pree (Netherlands) S van Emst	6	6
(Portugal) AF Santos (Latvia) E Tomase	4	4

Semifinals
1	(Portugal) F Jorge (Portugal) M Jorge	6	4	[13]
(Lithuania) I Dapkutė (Romania) B Szabó	1	6	[11]
4	(Czech Republic) A Sisková; M Timofeeva	2	6	[10]
(Netherlands) B du Pree (Netherlands) S van Emst	6	1	[8]

Final
1	(Portugal) F Jorge (Portugal) M Jorge	4	7	[10]
4	(Czech Republic) A Sisková; M Timofeeva	6	5	[7]
