= 2026 İstanbul Open =

- Date: 4–10 May
- Edition: 1st
- Category: WTA 125
- Draw: 32S / 16D
- Prize money: $115,000
- Surface: Clay
- Location: İstinye,Istanbul,Turkey
- Venue: TTF Istanbul Tennis Training Center (TTF İstanbul Tenis Merkezi)

Champions

Singles
- (Uzbekistan) Maria Timofeeva

Doubles
- Maria Kozyreva / (Brazil) Laura Pigossi
- İstanbul Open

The 2026 İstanbul Open was a professional women's tennis tournament played on outdoor clay courts. It was the 1st edition of this WTA 125 tournament, which was part of the 2026 WTA 125 Circuit. It took place in Istanbul, Turkey, from 4 through 10 May 2026. And the tournament director is Melis Yafe.

== Points and prize money ==
=== Points ===
Event	W	F	SF	QF	Round of 16	Round of 32	Q	Q2	Q1
Singles	125	81	49	27	15	1	6	4	1
Doubles	125	81	49	27	1	—N/a	—N/a	—N/a	—N/a

=== Prize money ===
Event	W	F	SF	QF	Round of 16	Round of 32	Q2	Q1
Singles	$15,500	$8,400	$5,300	$3,450	$2,000	$1,200	$800	$600
Doubles	$5,700	$2,900	$1,700	$1,175	$850	—N/a	—N/a	—N/a

== Singles main draw entrants ==
=== Seeds ===
Country	Player	Rank^{†}	Seed
CRO	Donna Vekić	66	1
GBR	Francesca Jones	102	2
UZB	Polina Kudermetova	137	3
CZE	Linda Fruhvirtová	150	4
BEL	Sofia Costoulas	151	5
UZB	Maria Timofeeva	154	6
FRA	Tiantsoa Rakotomanga Rajaonah	155	7
NED	Anouk Koevermans	159	8

^{†} Ranking are as of 20 April 2026.

=== Other entrants ===
The following players received wildcards into the singles main draw :

- (Turkey) Ayla Aksu
- (Turkey) Çağla Büyükakçay
- (Latvia) Adelina Lachinova
- (China) Sun Xinran

The following players received entry using a protected ranking:

- (Montenegro) Danka Kovinić
- (France) Alice Tubello

The following players received entry from the qualifying draw :

- (Spain) Lucía Cortez Llorca
- (Czech Republic) Tereza Martincová
- (Romania) Maria Sara Popa
- (Canada) Katherine Sebov

The following player received entry as a lucky loser:

- (Serbia) Mia Ristić

=== Withdrawals ===
Before the tournament

- (Chinese Taipei) Joanna Garland → replaced by (Australia) Storm Hunter
- (Slovenia) Kaja Juvan → replaced by (Bulgaria) Elizara Yaneva
- (Poland) Katarzyna Kawa → replaced by (France) Alice Tubello
- Tatiana Prozorova → replaced by Aliona Falei
- (Serbia) Lola Radivojević → replaced by (Turkey) Berfu Cengiz
- (China) Wang Xiyu → replaced by (Serbia) Mia Ristić (LL)
- (Slovenia) Tamara Zidanšek → replaced by (North Macedonia) Lina Gjorcheska

=== Retirement ===
- (Belgium) Sofia Costoulas (right ankle injury)

== Doubles main draw entrants ==
=== Seeds ===
Country	Player	Country	Player	Rank^{1}	Seed
AUS	Storm Hunter	NZL	Erin Routliffe	31	1
CZE	Anastasia Dețiuc	JPN	Makoto Ninomiya	137	2
NED	Isabelle Haverlag	GBR	Maia Lumsden	138	3
	Maria Kozyreva	BRA	Laura Pigossi	146	4

- ^{1} Rankings as of 20 April 2026.

=== Other entrants ===
The following pairs received a wildcard into the doubles main draw:

- (Turkey) Ayla Aksu / (Turkey) Çağla Büyükakçay

The following pair received entry into the doubles main draw as an alternate:

- (Romania) Maria Sara Popa / (Serbia) Mia Ristić

=== Withdrawals ===
Before the tournament

- (Belgium) Sofia Costoulas / (Georgia (country)) Ekaterine Gorgodze → replaced by (Romania) Maria Sara Popa / (Serbia) Mia Ristić

During the tournament

- (Uzbekistan) Polina Kudermetova / (Uzbekistan) Maria Timofeeva
- Elena Pridankina / (China) Tang Qianhui

== Finals ==
=== Singles ===
- (Uzbekistan) Maria Timofeeva def. (Croatia) Donna Vekić 6–4, 6–2

=== Doubles ===
- Maria Kozyreva / (Brazil) Laura Pigossi def. (Czech Republic) Anastasia Dețiuc / (Japan) Makoto Ninomiya 6–4, 4–6, [10–7]
