= 2025 The Campus Open – Singles =

Singles
- 2025 The Campus Open

Final
- Champion: Maria Timofeeva
- Runner-up: (United States) Alexis Blokhina
- Score: 7–6^{(9–7)}, 7–6^{(7–3)}

Events
Singles	Doubles
← 2024 ·	The Campus Open	· 2026 →

Kristina Dmitruk was the defending champion but chose not to compete.

Maria Timofeeva won the title, after defeating Alexis Blokhina 7–6^{(9–7)}, 7–6^{(7–3)} in the final.

== Seeds ==
1. Maria Timofeeva (champion)
2. (Italy) Nuria Brancaccio (quarterfinals)
3. (Belgium) Sofia Costoulas (second round)
4. (United States) Clervie Ngounoue (second round)
5. (Croatia) Jana Fett (quarterfinals)
6. (Germany) Mona Barthel (second round)
7. (Greece) Despina Papamichail (second round)
8. (Italy) Tyra Caterina Grant (first round)

== Draw ==
Key

- Q = Qualifier
- WC = Wild card
- LL = Lucky loser
- Alt = Alternate
- ITF = ITF entry
- PR = Protected ranking
- SR = Special ranking
- SE = Special exempt
- JE = Junior exempt
- JR = Junior Accelerator Programme entrant
- CO = College Accelerator Programme entrant
- NG = Next Gen Accelerator Program entrant
- w/o = Walkover
- r = Retired
- d = Defaulted

=== Finals ===
Semifinals
1	Maria Timofeeva	6	6
(Portugal) Francisca Jorge	2	4
Q	(United States) Alexis Blokhina	5
Q	Kira Pavlova	1^{r}

Final
1	Maria Timofeeva	7^{9}	7^{7}
Q	(United States) Alexis Blokhina	6^{7}	6^{3}

=== Top half ===
First round
1	M Timofeeva	6	3	6
Q	(United States) S Daavettila	1	6	2
Q	(Portugal) A Voloshchuk	4	1
(Turkey) A Aksu	6	6
Q	(Netherlands) B du Pree	6	6
(Croatia) L Bošković	1	1
(Germany) J Niemeier	2	3
5	(Croatia) J Fett	6	6
4	(United States) C Ngounoue	7^{7}	7
Q	(United States) C Ansari	6^{5}	5
(Portugal) F Jorge	6	3	7
(France) H Tan	2	6	5
WC	(Portugal) M Sequeira	0	0
(Italy) S Ambrosio	6	6
WC	(Portugal) I Murta	6^{2}	3
7	(Greece) D Papamichail	7^{7}	6

Second round
1	M Timofeeva	6	6
(Turkey) A Aksu	0	3
Q	(Netherlands) B du Pree	6^{6}	4
5	(Croatia) J Fett	7^{8}	6
4	(United States) C Ngounoue	4	3
(Portugal) F Jorge	6	6
(Italy) S Ambrosio	6	6
7	(Greece) D Papamichail	4	1

Quarterfinals
1	M Timofeeva	7^{7}	6
5	(Croatia) J Fett	6^{3}	4
(Portugal) F Jorge	4	7^{7}	6
(Italy) S Ambrosio	6	6^{2}	4

Semifinals
1	M Timofeeva	6	6
(Portugal) F Jorge	2	4

=== Bottom half ===
First round
6	(Germany) M Barthel	6	6
WC	(Portugal) S Lança	3	0
(Netherlands) L Tran	1	3
(Portugal) M Jorge	6	6
Q	(United States) A Blokhina	1	6	6
Q	(Italy) A Zucchini	6	1	2
(Malta) F Curmi	2	3
3	(Belgium) S Costoulas	6	6
8	(Italy) TC Grant	3	5
Q	K Pavlova	6	7
(Czech Republic) A Sisková	6	6
(Italy) A Zantedeschi	2	3
WC	(Portugal) C Tomai	1	0
(Liechtenstein) K von Deichmann	6	6
Q	(France) Y Mansouri	4	6^{3}
2	(Italy) N Brancaccio	6	7^{7}

Second round
6	(Germany) M Barthel	2	1
(Portugal) M Jorge	6	6
Q	(United States) A Blokhina	6	6
3	(Belgium) S Costoulas	2	0
Q	K Pavlova	6	6
(Czech Republic) A Sisková	4	2
(Liechtenstein) K von Deichmann	5	1
2	(Italy) N Brancaccio	7	6

Quarterfinals
(Portugal) M Jorge	1	6	6^{3}
Q	(United States) A Blokhina	6	2	7^{7}
Q	K Pavlova	3	6	6
2	(Italy) N Brancaccio	6	4	0

Semifinals
Q	(United States) A Blokhina	5
Q	K Pavlova	1^{r}
