= The Campus Open =

ITF Women's Tour
- Event name: The Campus Ladies Open
- Location: Quinta do Lago, Portugal
- Venue: The Campus
- Category: ITF Women's Circuit
- Surface: Hard
- Draw: 32S/32Q/16D
- Prize money: $60,000
- Website: thecampusqdl.com

The Campus Ladies Open (currently sponsored as The Campus Carby Volkswagen Ladies Open) is a professional tennis tournament. The event is played on outdoor hardcourts and is classified as a W75 ITF Women's Circuit tournament. It has been held in Quinta do Lago, Portugal, since 2022.

== Past finals ==
=== Singles ===
| Year | Champion | Runner-up | Score | Ref |
|---|---|---|---|---|
| 2025 | Maria Timofeeva | (United States) Alexis Blokhina | 7–6^{(9–7)}, 7–6^{(7–3)} | |
| 2024 | Kristina Dmitruk | (France) Yasmine Mansouri | 6–4, 6–3 | |
| 2023 | (Czech Republic) Gabriela Knutson | (United Kingdom) Harriet Dart | 6–4, 6–1 | |
| 2022 | (Spain) Jéssica Bouzas Maneiro | (Croatia) Tara Würth | 7–5, 5–4 ret. | |

=== Doubles ===
| Year | Champions | Runners-up | Score |
|---|---|---|---|
| 2025 | (Portugal) Francisca Jorge (Portugal) Matilde Jorge | (Czech Republic) Anna Sisková; Maria Timofeeva | 4–6, 7–5, [10–7] |
| 2024 | (Portugal) Matilde Jorge (Lithuania) Justina Mikulskytė | (Belgium) Magali Kempen (Belgium) Lara Salden | 2–6, 6–4, [14–12] |
| 2023 | (Australia) Olivia Gadecki (United Kingdom) Heather Watson | (Portugal) Francisca Jorge (Portugal) Matilde Jorge | 6–4, 6–1 |
| 2022 | (Portugal) Francisca Jorge (Portugal) Matilde Jorge | (South Korea) Ku Yeon-woo (Hungary) Adrienn Nagy | 6–4, 6–4 |
