= Alexis Blokhina =

American tennis player

- Country (sports): United States
- Born: August 17, 2004 (age 22) Redwood City, California
- Height: 1.68 m (5 ft 6 in)
- Plays: Left-handed
- College: Stanford
- Prize money: $38,873

Singles
- Career record: 71–46
- Career titles: 1 ITF
- Highest ranking: No. 355 (October 20, 2025)
- Current ranking: No. 593 (September 28, 2026)

Doubles
- Career record: 21–21
- Career titles: 1 ITF
- Highest ranking: No. 469 (October 9, 2023)
- Current ranking: No. 988 (September 28, 2026)
- Last updated on: 2 October 2026.

Alexis Blokhina (born August 17, 2004) is an American tennis player. She has a career-high singles ranking by the WTA of No. 355, achieved on 20 October 2025. She also has a career-high WTA doubles ranking of No. 469, achieved on 9 October 2023.

== Biography ==
Blokhina was born in Redwood City, California, to Lyana Blokhina and Oleg Blokhin, and is Jewish. She has a younger brother, Nathan. At 10 years of age, she moved to Miami, Florida. She attended Broward Virtual School in Fort Lauderdale, Florida.

Blokhina won gold medals in junior singles and doubles with Team USA at the 2022 Maccabiah Games in Israel. In 2022, she also won the Easter Bowl, the Indian Wells junior singles championship.

In 2023, Blokhina won her first ITF title at the W60 Lexington Challenger in doubles.

As of 2024, she plays college tennis at Stanford University, where she is majoring in Journalism and is the number one ranked national recruit in her class.

== ITF Circuit finals ==
=== Singles: 3 (1 title, 2 runner-ups) ===
Legend
W75 tournaments (0–1)
W50 tournaments (1–0)
W15 tournaments (0–1)

Result	W–L	Date	Tournament	Tier	Surface	Opponent	Score
Loss	0–1	Feb 2025	ITF Monastir, Tunisia	W15	Hard	(United States) Sara Daavettila	5–7, 3–4 ret.
Win	1–1	Jun 2025	ITF Troisdorf, Germany	W50	Clay	(Germany) Anna-Lena Friedsam	6–3, 2–6, 6–3
Loss	1–2	Oct 2025	The Campus Open, Portugal	W75	Hard	Maria Timofeeva	6–7^{(7)}, 6–7^{(3)}

=== Doubles: 1 (title) ===
Legend
W60 tournaments (1–0)

Result	W–L	Date	Tournament	Tier	Surface	Partner	Opponents	Score
Win	1–0	Aug 2023	Lexington Open, United States	W60	Hard	(United States) Ava Markham	(Australia) Olivia Gadecki (United States) Dalayna Hewitt	6–4, 7–6^{(1)}
