= Maria Timofeeva =

Uzbekistani tennis player (born 2003)

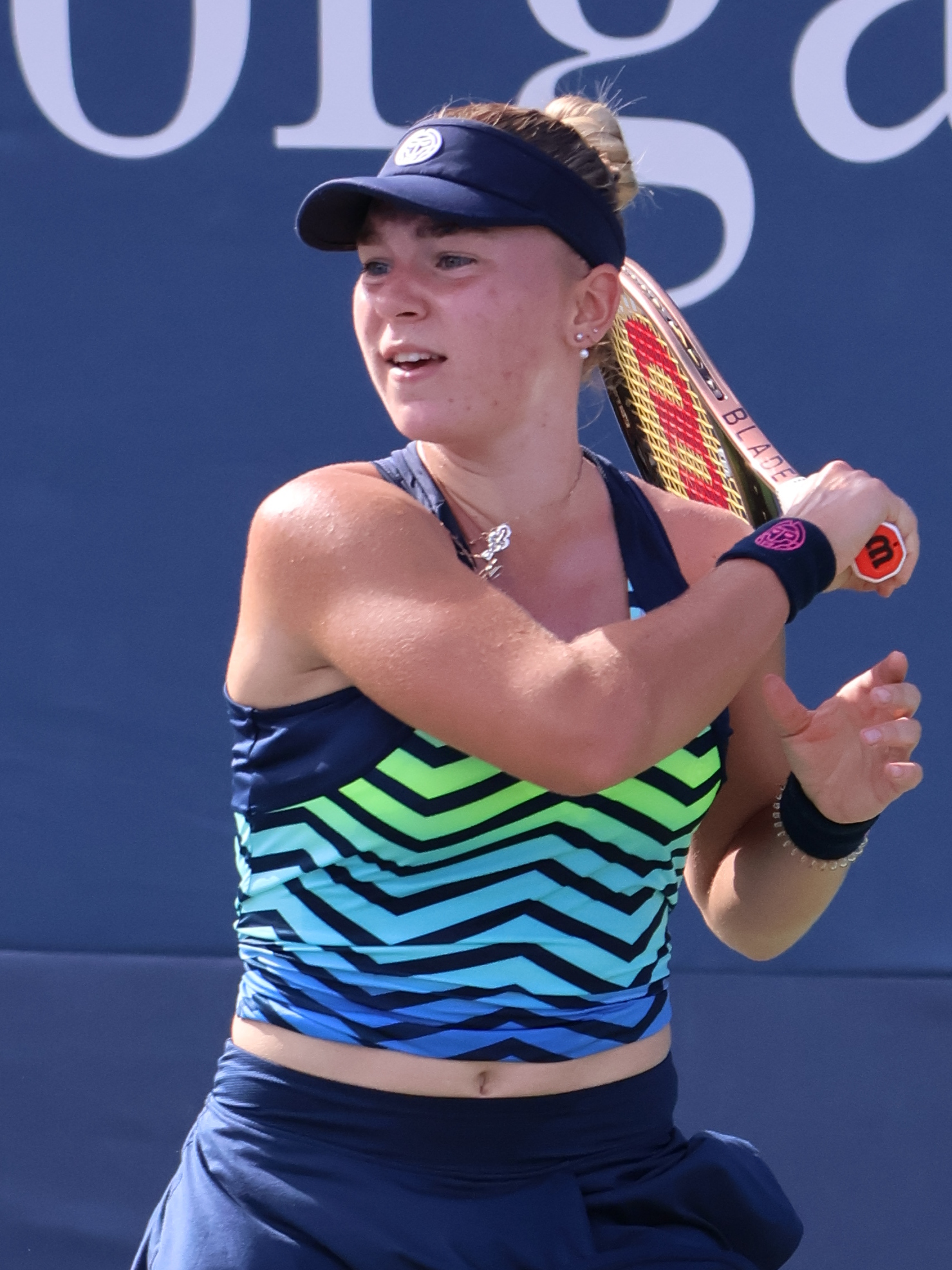
- Timofeeva at the 2023 US Open
- Full name: Maria Glebovna Timofeeva
- Country (sports): Uzbekistan (Oct 2025–); Russia (2017–2025)
- Residence: Tashkent, Uzbekistan
- Born: 18 November 2003 (age 22) Moscow, Russia
- Height: 1.67 m (5 ft 6 in)
- Plays: Right (two-handed backhand)
- Prize money: $1,435,141

Singles
- Career record: 243–141
- Career titles: 1
- Highest ranking: No. 63 (12 October 2026)
- Current ranking: No. 70 (2 November 2026)

Grand Slam singles results
- Australian Open: 4R (2024)
- French Open: 1R (2024)
- Wimbledon: 2R (2026)
- US Open: 2R (2026)

Doubles
- Career record: 94–57
- Career titles: 1
- Highest ranking: No. 179 (13 February 2023)
- Current ranking: No. 261 (2 November 2026)
- Last updated on: 2 November 2026.

Maria Glebovna Timofeeva (Russian: Мари́я Гле́бовна Тимофе́ева, IPA: [mɐˈrʲijə tʲɪmɐˈfʲe(j)ɪvə]; born 18 November 2003) is a Russian-born Uzbekistani professional tennis player. She has a career-high WTA singles ranking of No. 63, achieved on 12 October 2026, and a best doubles ranking of No. 179, reached on 13 February 2023.

Timofeeva has won one WTA Tour title in singles at the 2023 Budapest Grand Prix, and one in doubles at the Guangzhou International Open. She also earned eight singles and six doubles titles on the ITF World Tour.

== Career ==
=== 2017–2021 ===
In 2017, she won the Petits As U14 championship in Tarbes, France. In July 2021, she won the $60k President's Cup in Nur-Sultan, Kazakhstan, alongside Alina Charaeva.

=== 2023–2024: Major, WTA Tour & top 100 debuts, first career title ===
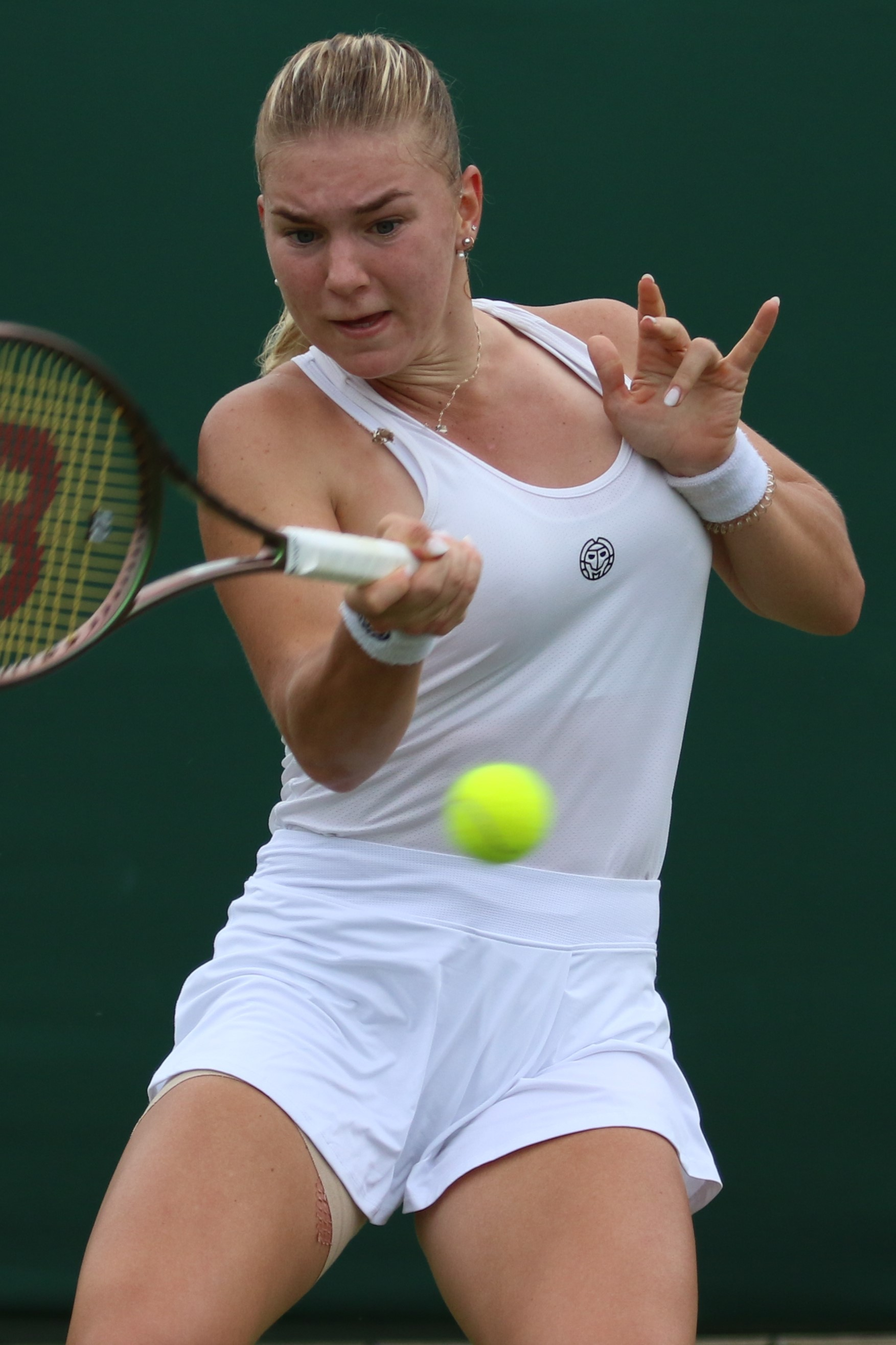
Timofeeva at the 2023 Wimbledon qualifying

Timofeeva won her first WTA Tour title on her main-draw debut at the Budapest Grand Prix in July 2023, defeating Kateryna Baindl in three sets in the final. She became only the fourth lucky loser in WTA history to win a singles title and the ninth player to win a title on her tour debut; she was the second to do both at once, following Olga Danilović at the 2018 Moscow River Cup. As a result, she reached the top 125 in the rankings, on 11 September 2023.

Ranked No. 170, she qualified for the 2024 Australian Open making her Grand Slam tournament debut. She defeated Alizé Cornet, former Australian Open champion Caroline Wozniacki and 10th seed Beatriz Haddad Maia to advance to the fourth round where she lost to Marta Kostyuk. She reached the top 100 on 29 January 2024, moving up 70 positions, becoming the first 2003-born player to enter the Top 100.

Timofeeva qualified for the 2024 Miami Open and defeated Varvara Gracheva, before losing in the second round to 26th seed Linda Nosková.

At the 2024 French Open, she lost in the first round to Wang Yafan in straight sets. Attempting to defend her Budapest Grand Prix title, Timofeeva won her opening match against qualifier Simona Waltert but then lost to Aliaksandra Sasnovich in round two.

=== 2025: Nationality change ===
On 20 October 2025, Timofeeva changed her nationality to Uzbekistan.

=== 2026: Wimbledon debut and first win, first WTA 125 title ===
She won her maiden WTA 125-level singles title in Istanbul.

She made her main-draw debut at the 2026 Wimbledon Championships with a win over wildcard entrant Heather Watson. It was her first major main draw since reaching the first round at Roland Garros in 2024. She recorded her first main-draw win over Beatriz Haddad Maia.

== National representation ==
On 20 October 2025, it was announced that Timofeeva received Uzbekistani citizenship and began representing Uzbekistan in competition. She stated that she and her family had been residing in Tashkent for the prior six months, and that she contacted the Uzbekistan Tennis Federation about a nationality switch on her own accord.

== Personal life ==
She's the granddaughter of Liubov Timofeeva, a famous classical pianist. At the 2023 US Open, Timofeeva began a blogging YouTube channel, Kiss My Ace, alongside friend and tennis player Ekaterina Kazionova, inspired by the blog of Daria Kasatkina. Maria Timofeeva's older sister, Antonina, is a rock singer who performs under the name Antonia Queen, and she is also a vocal coach.

In August 2023, then-Russian tennis player Maria Timofeeva revealed in an interview that Carlos Alcaraz had frequently messaged her on social media during their junior tournament days in 2018, though she did not reciprocate at the time.

== Performance timeline ==
Key
W	F	SF	QF	#R	RR	Q#	DNQ	A	NH

(W) winner; (F) finalist; (SF) semifinalist; (QF) quarterfinalist; (#R) rounds 4, 3, 2, 1; (RR) round-robin stage; (Q#) qualification round; (DNQ) did not qualify; (A) absent; (NH) not held; (SR) strike rate (events won / competed); (W–L) win–loss record.
To avoid confusion and double counting, these charts are updated at the conclusion of a tournament or when the player's participation has ended.

Only main-draw results in WTA Tour, Grand Slam tournaments, Billie Jean King Cup, United Cup, Hopman Cup and Olympic Games are included in win–loss records.

=== Singles ===
Tournament	2023	2024	2025	2026	W–L
Grand Slam tournaments
Australian Open	A	4R	Q2	Q1	3–1
French Open	Q3	1R	A	Q2	0–1
Wimbledon	Q1	Q1	A	2R	1–1
US Open	Q1	Q2	Q1	2R	1–1
Win–Loss	0–0	3–2	0–0	2–2	5–4
WTA 1000 tournaments
Qatar Open	NTI	Q1	A	A	0–0
Dubai Championships	A	Q1	A	A	0–0
Indian Wells Open	A	Q1	A	Q2	0–0
Miami Open	A	2R	A	Q1	1–1
Madrid Open	A	Q2	A	A	0–0
Italian Open	A	Q1	A	A	0–0
Canadian Open	A	A	A	A	0–0
Cincinnati Open	A	A	A	1R	0–1
China Open	A	A	Q1	2R	1–1
Wuhan Open	NH	A	A	A	0–0
Win–Loss	0–0	1–1	0–0	1–2	2–3

== WTA Tour finals ==
=== Singles: 1 (title) ===
Legend WTA 250 (1–0)	Finals by surface Clay (1–0)	Finals by setting Outdoor (1–0)

Result	Date	Tournament	Tier	Surface	Opponent	Score
Win	Jul 2023	Budapest Grand Prix, Hungary	WTA 250	Clay	(Ukraine) Kateryna Baindl	6–3, 3–6, 6–0

=== Doubles: 1 (title) ===
Legend WTA 250 (1–0)	Finals by surface Hard (1–0)	Finals by setting Outdoor (1–0)

Result	Date	Tournament	Tier	Surface	Partner	Opponents	Score
Win	Nov 2026	Guangzhou Open, China	WTA 250	Hard	(Uzbekistan) Polina Kudermetova	(Chinese Taipei) Cho I-hsuan (Chinese Taipei) Cho Yi-tsen	7–5, 7–6^{(7–1)}

== WTA 125 finals ==
=== Singles: 4 (3 titles, 1 runner-up) ===
Result	W–L	Date	Tournament	Surface	Opponent	Score
Loss	0–1	Sep 2025	Changsha Open, China	Clay	(Slovenia) Veronika Erjavec	1–6, 2–6
Win	1–1	May 2026	İstanbul Open, Turkey	Clay	(Croatia) Donna Vekić	6–4, 6–2
Win	2–1	Jun 2026	Makarska Open, Croatia	Clay	(Latvia) Darja Semeņistaja	6–2, 6–3
Win	3–1	Sep 2026	Porto Open, Portugal	Hard	(United States) Reese Brantmeier	7–6^{(10–8)}, 6–2

== ITF Circuit finals ==
=== Singles: 12 (8 titles, 4 runner-ups) ===
Legend
W100 tournaments (1–0)
W60 tournaments (2–0)
W40 tournaments (1–1)
W25 tournaments (1–2)
W15 tournaments (3–1)

Result	W–L	Date	Tournament	Tier	Surface	Opponent	Score
Win	1–0	Sep 2019	ITF Antalya, Turkey	W15	Hard	(Switzerland) Svenja Ochsner	7–6^{(3)}, 7–5
Win	2–0	Feb 2020	ITF Monastir, Tunisia	W15	Hard	(Switzerland) Karin Kennel	7–5, 6–4
Loss	2–1	Feb 2020	ITF Monastir, Tunisia	W15	Hard	(Romania) Ilona Georgiana Ghioroaie	5–7, 1–6
Win	3–1	Apr 2021	ITF Cairo, Egypt	W15	Clay	(Egypt) Sandra Samir	6–3, 6–3
Loss	3–2	Jun 2022	ITF Ra'anana, Israel	W25	Hard	Polina Kudermetova	6–4, 4–6, 5–7
Win	4–2	Jun 2022	ITF Ra'anana, Israel	W25	Hard	Valeria Savinykh	6–1, 6–2
Win	5–2	Jan 2023	ITF Monastir, Tunisia	W40	Hard	(Japan) Sakura Hosogi	7–5, 6–4
Loss	5–3	Apr 2023	ITF Murska Sobota, Slovenia	W40	Hard (i)	(Belgium) Magali Kempen	5–7, 5–7
Loss	5–4	Apr 2023	ITF Sharm El Sheik, Egypt	W25	Hard	(Hungary) Tímea Babos	4–6, 1–6
Win	6–4	Jul 2025	Figueira da Foz Open, Portugal	W100	Hard	Alina Korneeva	6–3, 6–0
Win	7–4	Oct 2025	The Campus Open, Portugal	W60	Hard	(United States) Alexis Blokhina	7–6^{(7)}, 7–6^{(3)}
Win	8–4	Apr 2026	Chiasso Open, Switzerland	W60	Clay	(Italy) Lisa Pigato	6–2, 6–3

=== Doubles: 16 (6 titles, 10 runner-ups) ===
Legend
W60 tournaments (1–5)
W25 tournaments (3–5)
W15 tournaments (2–0)

Result	W–L	Date	Tournament	Tier	Surface	Partner	Opponents	Score
Win	1–0	Feb 2021	ITF Monastir, Tunisia	W15	Hard	(Czech Republic) Linda Fruhvirtová	(France) Nina Radovanovic (Georgia (country)) Sopiko Tsitskishvili	6–1, 6–2
Win	2–0	Apr 2021	ITF Cairo, Egypt	W15	Clay	(Russia) Elina Avanesyan	(Netherlands) Isabelle Haverlag (Netherlands) Merel Hoedt	1–6, 6–4, [10–8]
Win	3–0	Jul 2021	President's Cup, Kazakhstan	W60	Hard	(Russia) Alina Charaeva	(Russia) Evgeniya Levashova (Brazil) Laura Pigossi	7–6^{(5)}, 2–6, [10–6]
Loss	3–1	Aug 2021	Verbier Open, Switzerland	W25	Hard	(Latvia) Diāna Marcinkēviča	(Russia) Erika Andreeva (Russia) Ekaterina Makarova	6–7^{(2)}, 1–6
Loss	3–2	Jan 2022	ITF Monastir, Tunisia	W25	Hard	(Russia) Amina Anshba	(Hong Kong) Eudice Chong (Hong Kong) Cody Wong	0–6, 1–6
Loss	3–3	Jan 2022	ITF Monastir, Tunisia	W25	Hard	(Belarus) Anna Kubareva	(Hong Kong) Eudice Chong (South Korea) Han Na-lae	5–7, 3–6
Loss	3–4	Feb 2022	Nur-Sultan Challenger, Kazakhstan	W60	Hard (i)	(Czech Republic) Anna Sisková	(Czech Republic) Linda Nosková; Ekaterina Makarova	2–6, 3–6
Loss	3–5	Mar 2022	Nur-Sultan Challenger 2	W25	Hard (i)	(Czech Republic) Anna Sisková	(Latvia) Kamilla Bartone; Ekaterina Makarova	6–1, 5–7, [8–10]
Loss	3–6	Mar 2022	ITF Antalya, Turkiye	W25	Clay	Amina Anshba	Diana Shnaider (Hungary) Amarissa Tóth	4–6, 2–6
Win	4–6	Apr 2022	ITF Chiang Rai, Thailand	W25	Hard	(Kazakhstan) Gozal Ainitdinova	(Japan) Momoko Kobori (Thailand) Luksika Kumkhum	2–6, 7–5, [10–4]
Loss	4–7	Jun 2022	Open de Biarritz, France	W60	Clay	(Argentina) María Lourdes Carlé	(Kazakhstan) Anna Danilina (Ukraine) Valeriya Strakhova	6–2, 3–6, [12–14]
Win	5–7	Jun 2022	ITF Ra'anana, Israel	W25	Hard	(Russia) Sofya Lansere	(Romania) Elena-Teodora Cadar (Hungary) Fanny Stollár	6–3, 7–6^{(5)}
Win	6–7	Jul 2022	ITF Aschaffenburg, Germany	W25	Clay	Irina Khromacheva	(Czech Republic) Karolína Kubáňová (Czech Republic) Ivana Šebestová	6–2, 5–7, [10–3]
Loss	6–8	Nov 2022	Meitar Open, Israel	W60	Hard	Anna Kubareva	(Greece) Valentini Grammatikopoulou; Ekaterina Yashina	3–6, 5–7
Loss	6–9	Feb 2023	Open de Grenoble, France	W60	Hard (i)	Sofya Lansere	(United Kingdom) Freya Christie (United Kingdom) Ali Collins	4–6, 3–6
Loss	6–10	Oct 2025	The Campus Open, Portugal	W60	Hard	(Czech Republic) Anna Sisková	(Portugal) Francisca Jorge (Portugal) Matilde Jorge	6–4, 5–7, [7–10]
