= 2013 ITF Women's Circuit (July–September) =

The 2013 ITF Women's Circuit is the 2013 edition of the second tier tour for women's professional tennis. It is organised by the International Tennis Federation and is a tier below the WTA Tour. The ITF Women's Circuit includes tournaments with prize money ranging from $10,000 up to $100,000.

== Key ==
$100,000 tournaments
$75,000 tournaments
$50,000 tournaments
$25,000 tournaments
$15,000 tournaments
$10,000 tournaments

== Month ==
=== July ===
Week of	Tournament	Winner	Runners-up	Semifinalists	Quarterfinalists
July 1, 2013	Cooper Challenger; Waterloo, Canada; Clay $50,000; Singles – Doubles	(Israel) Julia Glushko; 6–1, 6–3	(Canada) Gabriela Dabrowski	(Tunisia) Ons Jabeur (Australia) Sacha Jones	(Canada) Sharon Fichman (Canada) Jillian O'Neill (United States) Sachia Vickery (Australia) Monique Adamczak
July 1, 2013	Cooper Challenger; Waterloo, Canada; Clay $50,000; Singles – Doubles	(Canada) Gabriela Dabrowski (Canada) Sharon Fichman; 7–6^{(8–6)}, 6–3	(Japan) Misa Eguchi (Japan) Eri Hozumi	(Tunisia) Ons Jabeur (Australia) Sacha Jones	(Canada) Sharon Fichman (Canada) Jillian O'Neill (United States) Sachia Vickery (Australia) Monique Adamczak
July 1, 2013	Reinert Open; Versmold, Germany; Clay $50,000; Singles – Doubles	(Germany) Dinah Pfizenmaier; 6–4, 4–6, 6–4	(Ukraine) Maryna Zanevska	(France) Claire Feuerstein (Austria) Yvonne Meusburger	(Czech Republic) Renata Voráčová (Germany) Carina Witthöft (Liechtenstein) Stephanie Vogt (Germany) Antonia Lottner
July 1, 2013	Reinert Open; Versmold, Germany; Clay $50,000; Singles – Doubles	(Georgia (country)) Sofia Shapatava (Georgia (country)) Anna Tatishvili; 6–4, 6–4	(France) Claire Feuerstein (Czech Republic) Renata Voráčová	(France) Claire Feuerstein (Austria) Yvonne Meusburger	(Czech Republic) Renata Voráčová (Germany) Carina Witthöft (Liechtenstein) Stephanie Vogt (Germany) Antonia Lottner
July 1, 2013	FSP Gold River Women's Challenger; Sacramento, United States; Hard $50,000; Singles – Doubles	(Japan) Mayo Hibi; 7–5, 6–0	(United States) Madison Brengle	(Croatia) Ivana Lisjak (United States) Allie Will	(Russia) Alisa Kleybanova (Slovenia) Petra Rampre (Canada) Heidi El Tabakh (United States) Alexandra Stevenson
July 1, 2013	FSP Gold River Women's Challenger; Sacramento, United States; Hard $50,000; Singles – Doubles	(United Kingdom) Naomi Broady (Australia) Storm Sanders; 6–3, 6–4	(United States) Robin Anderson (United States) Lauren Embree	(Croatia) Ivana Lisjak (United States) Allie Will	(Russia) Alisa Kleybanova (Slovenia) Petra Rampre (Canada) Heidi El Tabakh (United States) Alexandra Stevenson
July 1, 2013	São José do Rio Preto, Brazil; Clay $25,000; Singles and doubles draws	(Argentina) Florencia Molinero; 0–6, 6–2, 6–3	(Argentina) María Irigoyen	(Brazil) Laura Pigossi (Paraguay) Verónica Cepede Royg	(Mexico) Ximena Hermoso (Argentina) Mailen Auroux (Brazil) Eduarda Piai (United States) Chieh-Yu Hsu
July 1, 2013	São José do Rio Preto, Brazil; Clay $25,000; Singles and doubles draws	(Paraguay) Verónica Cepede Royg (Venezuela) Adriana Pérez; 4–6, 6–4, [11–9]	(Bolivia) María Fernanda Álvarez Terán (Argentina) Mailen Auroux	(Brazil) Laura Pigossi (Paraguay) Verónica Cepede Royg	(Mexico) Ximena Hermoso (Argentina) Mailen Auroux (Brazil) Eduarda Piai (United States) Chieh-Yu Hsu
July 1, 2013	Denain, France; Clay $25,000; Singles and doubles draws	(Brazil) Teliana Pereira; 6–4, 7–5	(Italy) Alberta Brianti	(Poland) Sandra Zaniewska (Slovakia) Michaela Hončová	(Kazakhstan) Anna Danilina (France) Laura Thorpe (France) Alizé Lim (Italy) Corinna Dentoni
July 1, 2013	Denain, France; Clay $25,000; Singles and doubles draws	(Argentina) Tatiana Búa (Spain) Arabela Fernández Rabener; 7–5, 6–2	(Romania) Laura-Ioana Andrei (Bulgaria) Dia Evtimova	(Poland) Sandra Zaniewska (Slovakia) Michaela Hončová	(Kazakhstan) Anna Danilina (France) Laura Thorpe (France) Alizé Lim (Italy) Corinna Dentoni
July 1, 2013	Middelburg, Netherlands; Clay $25,000; Singles and doubles draws	(France) Irena Pavlovic; 6–3, 6–4	(Netherlands) Angelique van der Meet	(Latvia) Diāna Marcinkēviča (Russia) Alexandra Panova	(Switzerland) Conny Perrin (Sweden) Sandra Roma (Netherlands) Lesley Kerkhove (Slovakia) Kristína Kučová
July 1, 2013	Middelburg, Netherlands; Clay $25,000; Singles and doubles draws	(Ukraine) Veronika Kapshay (Kyrgyzstan) Ksenia Palkina; 6–3, 6–3	(Oman) Fatma Al-Nabhani (Belarus) Sviatlana Pirazhenka	(Latvia) Diāna Marcinkēviča (Russia) Alexandra Panova	(Switzerland) Conny Perrin (Sweden) Sandra Roma (Netherlands) Lesley Kerkhove (Slovakia) Kristína Kučová
July 1, 2013	Toruń, Poland; Clay $25,000; Singles and doubles draws	(Poland) Paula Kania; 6–4, 6–4	(Poland) Katarzyna Piter	(Slovakia) Anna Karolína Schmiedlová (Czech Republic) Denisa Allertová	(Romania) Cristina Dinu (Poland) Magda Linette (Montenegro) Danka Kovinić (Ukraine) Yuliya Beygelzimer
July 1, 2013	Toruń, Poland; Clay $25,000; Singles and doubles draws	(Poland) Paula Kania (Poland) Magda Linette; 6–2, 4–6, [10–5]	(Ukraine) Yuliya Beygelzimer (Romania) Elena Bogdan	(Slovakia) Anna Karolína Schmiedlová (Czech Republic) Denisa Allertová	(Romania) Cristina Dinu (Poland) Magda Linette (Montenegro) Danka Kovinić (Ukraine) Yuliya Beygelzimer
July 1, 2013	Přerov, Czech Republic; Clay $15,000; Singles and doubles draws	(Hungary) Réka-Luca Jani; 6–2, 7–6^{(7–4)}	(Russia) Ekaterina Alexandrova	(Russia) Victoria Kan (Ukraine) Olga Ianchuk	(Slovakia) Lenka Juríková (Slovakia) Chantal Škamlová (Ukraine) Ganna Poznikhirenko (Czech Republic) Petra Krejsová
July 1, 2013	Přerov, Czech Republic; Clay $15,000; Singles and doubles draws	(Czech Republic) Petra Krejsová (Czech Republic) Jesika Malečková; 6–1, 4–6, [10–5]	(Russia) Victoria Kan (Ukraine) Ganna Poznikhirenko	(Russia) Victoria Kan (Ukraine) Olga Ianchuk	(Slovakia) Lenka Juríková (Slovakia) Chantal Škamlová (Ukraine) Ganna Poznikhirenko (Czech Republic) Petra Krejsová
July 1, 2013	Brussels, Belgium; Clay $10,000; Singles and doubles draws	(Germany) Anna Klasen; 6–3, 6–3	(Russia) Eugeniya Pashkova	(Belgium) Steffi Distelmans (Germany) Nicola Geuer	(Belgium) Elke Lemmens (Ukraine) Anastasiya Vasylyeva (Italy) Camilla Rosatello (Belgium) Marie Benoît
July 1, 2013	Brussels, Belgium; Clay $10,000; Singles and doubles draws	(Germany) Anna Klasen (Germany) Charlotte Klasen; 6–1, 6–3	(Belgium) Michaela Boev (Ukraine) Anastasiya Vasylyeva	(Belgium) Steffi Distelmans (Germany) Nicola Geuer	(Belgium) Elke Lemmens (Ukraine) Anastasiya Vasylyeva (Italy) Camilla Rosatello (Belgium) Marie Benoît
July 1, 2013	Sharm el-Sheikh, Egypt; Hard $10,000; Singles and doubles draws	(Russia) Anna Morgina; 6–4, 6–3	(Italy) Valeria Prosperi	(South Africa) Madrie Le Roux (Greece) Despoina Vogasari	(Hungary) Naomi Totka (Egypt) Mai El Kamash (Russia) Liudmila Vasilyeva (Greece) Eleni Kordolaimi
July 1, 2013	Sharm el-Sheikh, Egypt; Hard $10,000; Singles and doubles draws	(Russia) Polina Monova (Russia) Julia Valetova; 6–1, 7–5	(Russia) Violetta Degtiareva (Ukraine) Ganna Piven	(South Africa) Madrie Le Roux (Greece) Despoina Vogasari	(Hungary) Naomi Totka (Egypt) Mai El Kamash (Russia) Liudmila Vasilyeva (Greece) Eleni Kordolaimi
July 1, 2013	Solo, Indonesia; Hard $10,000; Singles and doubles draws	(Indonesia) Lavinia Tananta; 7–5, 6–4	(Japan) Yumi Miyazaki	(India) Kanika Vaidya (Indonesia) Ayu Fani Damayanti	(China) Zhu Aiwen (China) Zhang Yukun (Japan) Michika Ozeki (Indonesia) Jessy Rompies
July 1, 2013	Solo, Indonesia; Hard $10,000; Singles and doubles draws	(Indonesia) Beatrice Gumulya (Indonesia) Jessy Rompies; 6–2, 6–4	(Indonesia) Aldila Sutjiadi (China) Zhu Aiwen	(India) Kanika Vaidya (Indonesia) Ayu Fani Damayanti	(China) Zhu Aiwen (China) Zhang Yukun (Japan) Michika Ozeki (Indonesia) Jessy Rompies
July 1, 2013	Todi, Italy; Clay $10,000; Singles and doubles draws	(Italy) Alice Balducci; 6–4, 6–3	(Armenia) Ani Amiraghyan	(France) Alix Collombon (Greece) Despina Papamichail	(Italy) Anna Floris (Italy) Giulia Sussarello (Italy) Martina Caregaro (Russia) Olga Doroshina
July 1, 2013	Todi, Italy; Clay $10,000; Singles and doubles draws	(Armenia) Ani Amiraghyan (Italy) Alice Balducci; 6–2, 6–3	(Italy) Claudia Giovine (Japan) Yuka Mori	(France) Alix Collombon (Greece) Despina Papamichail	(Italy) Anna Floris (Italy) Giulia Sussarello (Italy) Martina Caregaro (Russia) Olga Doroshina
July 1, 2013	Prokuplje, Serbia; Clay $10,000; Singles and doubles draws	(Bulgaria) Viktoriya Tomova; 7–6^{(7–2)}, 6–2	(Switzerland) Xenia Knoll	(Germany) Dejana Raickovic (Serbia) Milana Špremo	(Croatia) Ema Mikulčić (Slovenia) Tjaša Šrimpf (Romania) Ingrid-Alexandra Radu (Bulgaria) Dalia Zafirova
July 1, 2013	Prokuplje, Serbia; Clay $10,000; Singles and doubles draws	(North Macedonia) Lina Gjorcheska (Bulgaria) Dalia Zafirova; 6–3, 6–0	(Australia) Viktorija Rajicic (Bulgaria) Viktoriya Tomova	(Germany) Dejana Raickovic (Serbia) Milana Špremo	(Croatia) Ema Mikulčić (Slovenia) Tjaša Šrimpf (Romania) Ingrid-Alexandra Radu (Bulgaria) Dalia Zafirova
July 1, 2013	Bangkok, Thailand; Hard $10,000; Singles and doubles draws	(China) Lu Jiajing; 7–6^{(8–6)}, 7–5	(Hong Kong) Zhang Ling	(Japan) Shiho Akita (Japan) Yurina Koshino	(Chinese Taipei) Lee Pei-chi (Japan) Akari Inoue (Japan) Makoto Ninomiya (China) Wang Boyan
July 1, 2013	Bangkok, Thailand; Hard $10,000; Singles and doubles draws	(China) Lu Jiajing (China) Lu Jiaxiang; 6–4, 6–4	(Thailand) Napaporn Tongsalee (Thailand) Suchanun Viratprasert	(Japan) Shiho Akita (Japan) Yurina Koshino	(Chinese Taipei) Lee Pei-chi (Japan) Akari Inoue (Japan) Makoto Ninomiya (China) Wang Boyan
July 1, 2013	Istanbul, Turkey; Hard $10,000; Singles and doubles draws	(Spain) Nuria Párrizas Díaz; 6–1, 6–2	(France) Caroline Roméo	(Russia) Polina Leykina (Germany) Christina Shakovets	(Slovakia) Zuzana Zlochová (Czech Republic) Sandra Hönigová (Russia) Elizaveta Kulichkova (Serbia) Dunja Stamenković
July 1, 2013	Istanbul, Turkey; Hard $10,000; Singles and doubles draws	(Russia) Polina Leykina (Belarus) Lidziya Marozava; 7–6^{(7–2)}, 7–5	(Ukraine) Maryna Kolb (Ukraine) Nadiya Kolb	(Russia) Polina Leykina (Germany) Christina Shakovets	(Slovakia) Zuzana Zlochová (Czech Republic) Sandra Hönigová (Russia) Elizaveta Kulichkova (Serbia) Dunja Stamenković
July 8, 2013	Open GDF Suez de Biarritz; Biarritz, France; Clay $100,000; Singles – Doubles	(Liechtenstein) Stephanie Vogt; 1–6, 6–3, 6–2	(Slovakia) Anna Karolína Schmiedlová	(France) Laura Thorpe (France) Alizé Lim	(Germany) Anne Schäfer (Ukraine) Olga Savchuk (Ukraine) Nadiia Kichenok (France) Pauline Parmentier
July 8, 2013	Open GDF Suez de Biarritz; Biarritz, France; Clay $100,000; Singles – Doubles	(Ukraine) Yuliya Beygelzimer (Ukraine) Olga Savchuk; 2–6, 6–4, [10–8]	(Russia) Vera Dushevina (Croatia) Ana Vrljić	(France) Laura Thorpe (France) Alizé Lim	(Germany) Anne Schäfer (Ukraine) Olga Savchuk (Ukraine) Nadiia Kichenok (France) Pauline Parmentier
July 8, 2013	Beijing International Challenger; Beijing, China; Hard $75,000; Singles – Doubles	(China) Zhang Shuai; 6–2, 6–1	(China) Zhou Yimiao	(Japan) Misaki Doi (China) Zheng Saisai	(China) Liu Fangzhou (Netherlands) Michaëlla Krajicek (Japan) Yurika Sema (China) Zhou Xiao
July 8, 2013	Beijing International Challenger; Beijing, China; Hard $75,000; Singles – Doubles	(China) Liu Chang (China) Zhou Yimiao; 7–6^{(7–1)}, 6–4	(Japan) Misaki Doi (Japan) Miki Miyamura	(Japan) Misaki Doi (China) Zheng Saisai	(China) Liu Fangzhou (Netherlands) Michaëlla Krajicek (Japan) Yurika Sema (China) Zhou Xiao
July 8, 2013	Yakima Regional Hospital Challenger; Yakima, United States; Hard $50,000; Singles – Doubles	(United States) Nicole Gibbs; 6–1, 6–4	(Croatia) Ivana Lisjak	(Australia) Storm Sanders (Israel) Julia Glushko	(South Africa) Chanel Simmonds (United States) Shelby Rogers (United States) Ashley Weinhold (United States) Sachia Vickery
July 8, 2013	Yakima Regional Hospital Challenger; Yakima, United States; Hard $50,000; Singles – Doubles	(United States) Jan Abaza (United States) Allie Will; 7–5, 3–6, [10–3]	(United Kingdom) Naomi Broady (United States) Irina Falconi	(Australia) Storm Sanders (Israel) Julia Glushko	(South Africa) Chanel Simmonds (United States) Shelby Rogers (United States) Ashley Weinhold (United States) Sachia Vickery
July 8, 2013	Campinas, Brazil; Clay $25,000; Singles and doubles draws	(Argentina) María Irigoyen; 6–2, 6–2	(Paraguay) Verónica Cepede Royg	(Argentina) Andrea Benítez (Argentina) Florencia Molinero	(Brazil) Gabriela Cé (Brazil) Beatriz Haddad Maia (Argentina) Catalina Pella (United Kingdom) Amanda Carreras
July 8, 2013	Campinas, Brazil; Clay $25,000; Singles and doubles draws	(Paraguay) Verónica Cepede Royg (Venezuela) Adriana Pérez; 6–0, 6–1	(Argentina) Florencia Molinero (Argentina) Carolina Zeballos	(Argentina) Andrea Benítez (Argentina) Florencia Molinero	(Brazil) Gabriela Cé (Brazil) Beatriz Haddad Maia (Argentina) Catalina Pella (United Kingdom) Amanda Carreras
July 8, 2013	Aschaffenburg, Germany; Clay $25,000; Singles and doubles draws	(Slovenia) Maša Zec Peškirič; 6–4, 6–4	(Slovenia) Dalila Jakupović	(Netherlands) Angelique van der Meet (Georgia (country)) Ekaterine Gorgodze	(Germany) Anna-Lena Friedsam (Russia) Yuliya Kalabina (Netherlands) Lesley Kerkhove (Netherlands) Lisanne van Riet
July 8, 2013	Aschaffenburg, Germany; Clay $25,000; Singles and doubles draws	(Netherlands) Demi Schuurs (Netherlands) Eva Wacanno; 7–5, 1–6, [14–12]	(Germany) Carolin Daniels (Germany) Laura Schaeder	(Netherlands) Angelique van der Meet (Georgia (country)) Ekaterine Gorgodze	(Germany) Anna-Lena Friedsam (Russia) Yuliya Kalabina (Netherlands) Lesley Kerkhove (Netherlands) Lisanne van Riet
July 8, 2013	Istanbul, Turkey; Hard $25,000; Singles and doubles draws	(Russia) Elizaveta Kulichkova; 6–3, 4–6, 6–0	(Ukraine) Kateryna Kozlova	(Turkey) Çağla Büyükakçay (Turkey) Pemra Özgen	(Austria) Melanie Klaffner (Georgia (country)) Oksana Kalashnikova (United Kingdom) Tara Moore (Bosnia and Herzegovina) Jasmina Tinjić
July 8, 2013	Istanbul, Turkey; Hard $25,000; Singles and doubles draws	(Georgia (country)) Oksana Kalashnikova; Lyudmyla Kichenok; 6–2, 4–6, [10–7]	(Ukraine) Alona Fomina (Slovenia) Anja Prislan	(Turkey) Çağla Büyükakçay (Turkey) Pemra Özgen	(Austria) Melanie Klaffner (Georgia (country)) Oksana Kalashnikova (United Kingdom) Tara Moore (Bosnia and Herzegovina) Jasmina Tinjić
July 8, 2013	Sharm el-Sheikh, Egypt; Hard $10,000; Singles and doubles draws	(Russia) Anna Morgina; 6–1, 6–3	(France) Pauline Payet	(South Africa) Lynn Kiro (Belgium) India Maggen	(Germany) Amelie Intert (New Zealand) Emma Hayman (United Kingdom) Danielle Konotoptseva (Italy) Jasmin Ladurner
July 8, 2013	Sharm el-Sheikh, Egypt; Hard $10,000; Singles and doubles draws	(United States) Kristi Boxx (New Zealand) Abigail Guthrie; 6–1, 6–2	(Russia) Anna Morgina (Hungary) Naomi Totka	(South Africa) Lynn Kiro (Belgium) India Maggen	(Germany) Amelie Intert (New Zealand) Emma Hayman (United Kingdom) Danielle Konotoptseva (Italy) Jasmin Ladurner
July 8, 2013	Turin, Italy; Clay $10,000; Singles and doubles draws	(Italy) Claudia Giovine; 4–6, 7–6^{(8–6)}, 6–2	(Italy) Federica Di Sarra	(Italy) Martina Di Giuseppe (Russia) Olga Doroshina	(Italy) Alessandra Simonelli (Italy) Camilla Rosatello (Italy) Alice Savoretti (Italy) Annalisa Bona
July 8, 2013	Turin, Italy; Clay $10,000; Singles and doubles draws	(Russia) Olga Doroshina (Italy) Camilla Rosatello; 6–2, 6–1	(Italy) Maria Masini (Japan) Yuka Mori	(Italy) Martina Di Giuseppe (Russia) Olga Doroshina	(Italy) Alessandra Simonelli (Italy) Camilla Rosatello (Italy) Alice Savoretti (Italy) Annalisa Bona
July 8, 2013	Solo, Indonesia; Hard $10,000; Singles and doubles draws	(Indonesia) Ayu Fani Damayanti; 7–5, 6–2	(Japan) Yumi Miyazaki	(Japan) Misa Kinoshita (Japan) Yumi Nakano	(Japan) Kotomi Takahata (China) Zhu Aiwen (Hong Kong) Katherine Ip (China) Gai Ao
July 8, 2013	Solo, Indonesia; Hard $10,000; Singles and doubles draws	(Indonesia) Ayu Fani Damayanti (Indonesia) Lavinia Tananta; 4–6, 6–1, [10–5]	(Indonesia) Beatrice Gumulya (Indonesia) Jessy Rompies	(Japan) Misa Kinoshita (Japan) Yumi Nakano	(Japan) Kotomi Takahata (China) Zhu Aiwen (Hong Kong) Katherine Ip (China) Gai Ao
July 8, 2013	Iași, Romania; Clay $10,000; Singles and doubles draws	(Belgium) Marie Benoît; 6–3, 7–6^{(7–0)}	(Romania) Raluca Elena Platon	(Romania) Diana Buzean (Romania) Elena-Teodora Cadar	(Romania) Ioana Ducu (Romania) Georgiana Pătrașc (France) Anaève Pain (Romania) Simona Ionescu
July 8, 2013	Iași, Romania; Clay $10,000; Singles and doubles draws	(Romania) Irina Maria Bara (Romania) Diana Buzean; 6–2, 6–1	(Bosnia and Herzegovina) Anita Husarić (Ukraine) Kateryna Sliusar	(Romania) Diana Buzean (Romania) Elena-Teodora Cadar	(Romania) Ioana Ducu (Romania) Georgiana Pătrașc (France) Anaève Pain (Romania) Simona Ionescu
July 8, 2013	Getxo, Spain; Clay $10,000; Singles and doubles draws	(Italy) Gaia Sanesi; 7–5, 5–7, 7–5	(Argentina) Tatiana Búa	(Portugal) Bárbara Luz (France) Jade Suvrijn	(Spain) Andrea Lázaro García (Sweden) Jacqueline Cabaj Awad (Italy) Giulia Sussarello (France) Clothilde de Bernardi
July 8, 2013	Getxo, Spain; Clay $10,000; Singles and doubles draws	(Sweden) Jacqueline Cabaj Awad (Sweden) Cornelia Lister; 6–2, 6–4	(Australia) Ashley Keir (Ecuador) Charlotte Römer	(Portugal) Bárbara Luz (France) Jade Suvrijn	(Spain) Andrea Lázaro García (Sweden) Jacqueline Cabaj Awad (Italy) Giulia Sussarello (France) Clothilde de Bernardi
July 8, 2013	Bangkok, Thailand; Hard $10,000; Singles and doubles draws	(China) Lu Jiajing; 5–7, 6–3, 6–3	(Thailand) Katherine Westbury	(Japan) Makoto Ninomiya (China) Lu Jiaxiang	(Japan) Chihiro Nunome (Chinese Taipei) Lee Pei-chi (Thailand) Apichaya Runglerdkriangkrai (Australia) Isabella Holland
July 8, 2013	Bangkok, Thailand; Hard $10,000; Singles and doubles draws	(China) Lu Jiajing (China) Lu Jiaxiang; 6–4, 6–4	(Chinese Taipei) Lee Pei-chi (Thailand) Varunya Wongteanchai	(Japan) Makoto Ninomiya (China) Lu Jiaxiang	(Japan) Chihiro Nunome (Chinese Taipei) Lee Pei-chi (Thailand) Apichaya Runglerdkriangkrai (Australia) Isabella Holland
July 15, 2013	ITS Cup; Olomouc, Czech Republic; Clay $100,000; Singles – Doubles	(Slovenia) Polona Hercog; 6–0, 6–3	(Poland) Katarzyna Piter	(Ukraine) Maryna Zanevska (Czech Republic) Barbora Záhlavová-Strýcová	(Ukraine) Nadiia Kichenok (Czech Republic) Renata Voráčová (Romania) Cristina Dinu (Belgium) Alison Van Uytvanck
July 15, 2013	ITS Cup; Olomouc, Czech Republic; Clay $100,000; Singles – Doubles	(Czech Republic) Renata Voráčová (Czech Republic) Barbora Záhlavová-Strýcová; 6–3, 6–4	(Czech Republic) Martina Borecká (Czech Republic) Tereza Malíková	(Ukraine) Maryna Zanevska (Czech Republic) Barbora Záhlavová-Strýcová	(Ukraine) Nadiia Kichenok (Czech Republic) Renata Voráčová (Romania) Cristina Dinu (Belgium) Alison Van Uytvanck
July 15, 2013	Open 88 Contrexéville; Contrexéville, France; Clay $50,000; Singles – Doubles	(Switzerland) Timea Bacsinszky; 6–1, 6–1	(Spain) Beatriz García Vidagany	(France) Constance Sibille (Croatia) Ana Konjuh	(France) Claire Feuerstein (France) Fiona Ferro (Poland) Sandra Zaniewska (Netherlands) Angelique van der Meet
July 15, 2013	Open 88 Contrexéville; Contrexéville, France; Clay $50,000; Singles – Doubles	(Argentina) Vanesa Furlanetto (France) Amandine Hesse; 7–6^{(7–3)}, 6–4	(Croatia) Ana Konjuh (Croatia) Silvia Njirić	(France) Constance Sibille (Croatia) Ana Konjuh	(France) Claire Feuerstein (France) Fiona Ferro (Poland) Sandra Zaniewska (Netherlands) Angelique van der Meet
July 15, 2013	Oregon Challenger; Portland, United States; Hard $50,000; Singles – Doubles	(Japan) Kurumi Nara; 3–6, 6–3, 6–3	(United States) Alison Riske	(United States) Grace Min (United States) Shelby Rogers	(Japan) Mayo Hibi (Japan) Erika Sema (United States) Brianna Morgan (United States) Nicole Gibbs
July 15, 2013	Oregon Challenger; Portland, United States; Hard $50,000; Singles – Doubles	(United States) Irina Falconi (United States) Nicole Melichar; 4–6, 6–3, [10–8]	(United States) Sanaz Marand (United States) Ashley Weinhold	(United States) Grace Min (United States) Shelby Rogers	(Japan) Mayo Hibi (Japan) Erika Sema (United States) Brianna Morgan (United States) Nicole Gibbs
July 15, 2013	Campos do Jordão, Brazil; Hard $25,000; Singles and doubles draws	(Brazil) Paula Cristina Gonçalves; 3–6, 7–5, 6–1	(Argentina) María Irigoyen	(United States) Chieh-Yu Hsu (Argentina) Florencia Molinero	(Argentina) Mailen Auroux (Brazil) Laura Pigossi (Venezuela) Adriana Pérez (Paraguay) Verónica Cepede Royg
July 15, 2013	Campos do Jordão, Brazil; Hard $25,000; Singles and doubles draws	(Brazil) Paula Cristina Gonçalves (Argentina) María Irigoyen; 7–5, 6–3	(Bolivia) María Fernanda Álvarez Terán (Brazil) Maria Fernanda Alves	(United States) Chieh-Yu Hsu (Argentina) Florencia Molinero	(Argentina) Mailen Auroux (Brazil) Laura Pigossi (Venezuela) Adriana Pérez (Paraguay) Verónica Cepede Royg
July 15, 2013	Challenger Banque Nationale de Granby; Granby, Canada; Hard $25,000; Singles – Doubles	(Japan) Risa Ozaki; 0–6, 7–5, 6–2	(United Kingdom) Samantha Murray	(Japan) Eri Hozumi (France) Julie Coin	(Australia) Olivia Rogowska (France) Sherazad Benamar (Japan) Riko Sawayanagi (Japan) Miki Miyamura
July 15, 2013	Challenger Banque Nationale de Granby; Granby, Canada; Hard $25,000; Singles – Doubles	(United States) Lena Litvak (Canada) Carol Zhao; 7–5, 6–4	(France) Julie Coin (United Kingdom) Emily Webley-Smith	(Japan) Eri Hozumi (France) Julie Coin	(Australia) Olivia Rogowska (France) Sherazad Benamar (Japan) Riko Sawayanagi (Japan) Miki Miyamura
July 15, 2013	Darmstadt, Germany; Clay $25,000; Singles and doubles draws	(Slovakia) Petra Uberalová; 7–6^{(7–3)}, 6–4	(Germany) Lena-Marie Hofmann	(Germany) Tamara Korpatsch (Russia) Polina Vinogradova	(Russia) Alexandra Artamonova (Switzerland) Karin Kennel (Germany) Natalie Pröse (Russia) Yana Sizikova
July 15, 2013	Darmstadt, Germany; Clay $25,000; Singles and doubles draws	(Russia) Alexandra Artamonova (Russia) Natela Dzalamidze; 6–3, 7–6^{(7–5)}	(Germany) Christina Shakovets (Slovenia) Maša Zec Peškirič	(Germany) Tamara Korpatsch (Russia) Polina Vinogradova	(Russia) Alexandra Artamonova (Switzerland) Karin Kennel (Germany) Natalie Pröse (Russia) Yana Sizikova
July 15, 2013	Imola, Italy; Carpet $25,000; Singles and doubles draws	(Russia) Victoria Kan; 3–6, 7–5, 6–2	(Ukraine) Lyudmyla Kichenok	(Spain) Nuria Párrizas Díaz (Netherlands) Indy de Vroome	(Switzerland) Xenia Knoll (Italy) Carolina Pillot (Russia) Marina Shamayko (Italy) Alice Balducci
July 15, 2013	Imola, Italy; Carpet $25,000; Singles and doubles draws	(Ukraine) Lyudmyla Kichenok (Latvia) Jeļena Ostapenko; 6–4, 3–6, [10–3]	(Philippines) Katharina Lehnert (Italy) Alice Matteucci	(Spain) Nuria Párrizas Díaz (Netherlands) Indy de Vroome	(Switzerland) Xenia Knoll (Italy) Carolina Pillot (Russia) Marina Shamayko (Italy) Alice Balducci
July 15, 2013	Woking, United Kingdom; Hard $25,000; Singles and doubles draws	(Turkey) Pemra Özgen; 3–6, 7–5, 7–6^{(12–10)}	(United Kingdom) Tara Moore	(United Kingdom) Lisa Whybourn (Serbia) Jovana Jakšić	(Russia) Marta Sirotkina (France) Irena Pavlovic (Japan) Junri Namigata (Japan) Mari Tanaka
July 15, 2013	Woking, United Kingdom; Hard $25,000; Singles and doubles draws	(United Kingdom) Tara Moore (Russia) Marta Sirotkina; 4–6, 6–1, [10–7]	(Japan) Kanae Hisami (Japan) Mari Tanaka	(United Kingdom) Lisa Whybourn (Serbia) Jovana Jakšić	(Russia) Marta Sirotkina (France) Irena Pavlovic (Japan) Junri Namigata (Japan) Mari Tanaka
July 15, 2013	Knokke, Belgium; Clay $10,000; Singles and doubles draws	(Italy) Gaia Sanesi; 6–3, 6–3	(Switzerland) Tess Sugnaux	(Italy) Martina Caregaro (Japan) Mana Ayukawa	(Belgium) Nicky Van Dyck (France) Marine Partaud (Belgium) Margaux Brabant (Belgium) Magali Kempen
July 15, 2013	Knokke, Belgium; Clay $10,000; Singles and doubles draws	(Japan) Mana Ayukawa (Netherlands) Monique Zuur; 6–2, 4–6, [10–8]	(Belgium) Elke Lemmens (Belgium) Sofie Oyen	(Italy) Martina Caregaro (Japan) Mana Ayukawa	(Belgium) Nicky Van Dyck (France) Marine Partaud (Belgium) Margaux Brabant (Belgium) Magali Kempen
July 15, 2013	Sharm el-Sheikh, Egypt; Hard $10,000; Singles and doubles draws	(Italy) Giulia Bruzzone; 6–4, 6–1	(United Kingdom) Danielle Konotoptseva	(Russia) Alina Mikheeva (New Zealand) Dianne Hollands	(Russia) Ekaterina Tretyak (Greece) Eleni Kordolaimi (United States) Kristi Boxx (Belgium) India Maggen
July 15, 2013	Sharm el-Sheikh, Egypt; Hard $10,000; Singles and doubles draws	(South Africa) Lynn Kiro (Egypt) Mayar Sherif; 6–3, 6–2	(Russia) Alina Mikheeva (Russia) Anna Morgina	(Russia) Alina Mikheeva (New Zealand) Dianne Hollands	(Russia) Ekaterina Tretyak (Greece) Eleni Kordolaimi (United States) Kristi Boxx (Belgium) India Maggen
July 15, 2013	New Delhi, India; Hard $10,000; Singles and doubles draws	(India) Ankita Raina; 6–4, 6–4	(India) Kanika Vaidya	(India) Natasha Palha (India) Rishika Sunkara	(India) Eetee Maheta (India) Nidhi Chilumula (India) Shweta Rana (India) Sharmada Balu
July 15, 2013	New Delhi, India; Hard $10,000; Singles and doubles draws	(India) Sharmada Balu (India) Sowjanya Bavisetti; 6–2, 6–4	(India) Ankita Raina (India) Shweta Rana	(India) Natasha Palha (India) Rishika Sunkara	(India) Eetee Maheta (India) Nidhi Chilumula (India) Shweta Rana (India) Sharmada Balu
July 15, 2013	Valladolid, Spain; Hard $10,000; Singles and doubles draws	(Spain) Andrea Lázaro García; 6–3, 3–6, 6–0	(Italy) Camilla Rosatello	(Argentina) Tatiana Búa (Spain) Olga Sáez Larra	(France) Jessika Ponchet (Spain) Aina Schaffner Riera (Australia) Alexandra Nancarrow (France) Josepha Adam
July 15, 2013	Valladolid, Spain; Hard $10,000; Singles and doubles draws	(India) Rutuja Bhosale (Italy) Camilla Rosatello; 6–4, 6–0	(Spain) Lucía Cervera Vázquez (Spain) Carolina Prats Millán	(Argentina) Tatiana Búa (Spain) Olga Sáez Larra	(France) Jessika Ponchet (Spain) Aina Schaffner Riera (Australia) Alexandra Nancarrow (France) Josepha Adam
July 15, 2013	İzmir, Turkey; Hard $10,000; Singles and doubles draws	(Slovakia) Zuzana Zlochová; 6–3, 3–6, 6–0	(Turkey) Melis Sezer	(Turkey) Hülya Esen (Turkey) Başak Eraydın	(Germany) Jasmin Steinherr (Ukraine) Khristina Kazimova (Romania) Stefana Andrei (Russia) Vera Bessonova
July 15, 2013	İzmir, Turkey; Hard $10,000; Singles and doubles draws	(Turkey) Başak Eraydın (Slovakia) Zuzana Zlochová; 6–1, 6–3	(Turkey) Hülya Esen (Turkey) Lütfiye Esen	(Turkey) Hülya Esen (Turkey) Başak Eraydın	(Germany) Jasmin Steinherr (Ukraine) Khristina Kazimova (Romania) Stefana Andrei (Russia) Vera Bessonova
July 15, 2013	Evansville, United States; Hard $10,000; Singles and doubles draws	(United States) Emina Bektas; 4–6, 6–4, 6–3	(United States) Brooke Austin	(South Africa) Michelle Sammons (United States) Denise Muresan	(United States) Kyle McPhillips (United States) Lauren Albanese (United States) Nyla Beenk (Japan) Ayaka Okuno
July 15, 2013	Evansville, United States; Hard $10,000; Singles and doubles draws	(United States) Emina Bektas (United States) Brooke Bolender; 6–4, 6–4	(United States) Denise Muresan (United States) Jacqueline Wu	(South Africa) Michelle Sammons (United States) Denise Muresan	(United States) Kyle McPhillips (United States) Lauren Albanese (United States) Nyla Beenk (Japan) Ayaka Okuno
July 22, 2013	President's Cup; Astana, Kazakhstan; Hard $100,000; Singles – Doubles	(Ukraine) Nadiia Kichenok; 6–4, 7–5	(Portugal) Maria João Koehler	(France) Alizé Lim (Thailand) Luksika Kumkhum	(Turkey) Çağla Büyükakçay (Russia) Nina Bratchikova (Russia) Alexandra Panova (Russia) Ekaterina Bychkova
July 22, 2013	President's Cup; Astana, Kazakhstan; Hard $100,000; Singles – Doubles	(Ukraine) Lyudmyla Kichenok (Ukraine) Nadiia Kichenok; 6–2, 6–2	(Russia) Nina Bratchikova (Russia) Valeria Solovyeva	(France) Alizé Lim (Thailand) Luksika Kumkhum	(Turkey) Çağla Büyükakçay (Russia) Nina Bratchikova (Russia) Alexandra Panova (Russia) Ekaterina Bychkova
July 22, 2013	Fifth Third Bank Tennis Championships; Lexington, United States; Hard $50,000; Singles – Doubles	(United States) Shelby Rogers; 6–4, 7–6^{(7–3)}	(France) Julie Coin	(Japan) Kurumi Nara (Israel) Julia Glushko	(Japan) Misaki Doi (Thailand) Nicha Lertpitaksinchai (Colombia) Catalina Castaño (South Africa) Chanel Simmonds
July 22, 2013	Fifth Third Bank Tennis Championships; Lexington, United States; Hard $50,000; Singles – Doubles	(Thailand) Nicha Lertpitaksinchai (Thailand) Peangtarn Plipuech; 7–6^{(7–5)}, 6–3	(Israel) Julia Glushko (South Africa) Chanel Simmonds	(Japan) Kurumi Nara (Israel) Julia Glushko	(Japan) Misaki Doi (Thailand) Nicha Lertpitaksinchai (Colombia) Catalina Castaño (South Africa) Chanel Simmonds
July 22, 2013	Winnipeg, Canada; Hard $25,000; Singles and doubles draws	(United Kingdom) Johanna Konta; 6–3, 6–1	(United Kingdom) Samantha Murray	(Japan) Risa Ozaki (Japan) Nao Hibino	(Japan) Miharu Imanishi (Japan) Akiko Omae (United Kingdom) Naomi Broady (Australia) Olivia Rogowska
July 22, 2013	Winnipeg, Canada; Hard $25,000; Singles and doubles draws	(Canada) Heidi El Tabakh (United States) Allie Kiick; 6–4, 2–6, [10–8]	(United Kingdom) Samantha Murray (United Kingdom) Jade Windley	(Japan) Risa Ozaki (Japan) Nao Hibino	(Japan) Miharu Imanishi (Japan) Akiko Omae (United Kingdom) Naomi Broady (Australia) Olivia Rogowska
July 22, 2013	Les Contamines-Montjoie, France; Hard $25,000; Singles and doubles draws	(Slovakia) Kristína Kučová; 7–5, 6–7^{(3–7)}, 6–3	(France) Clothilde de Bernardi	(Italy) Giulia Gatto-Monticone (Switzerland) Xenia Knoll	(Germany) Dinah Pfizenmaier (Spain) Arantxa Parra Santonja (Germany) Carina Witthöft (France) Estelle Cascino
July 22, 2013	Les Contamines-Montjoie, France; Hard $25,000; Singles and doubles draws	(Italy) Nicole Clerico (Czech Republic) Nikola Fraňková; 3–6, 7–6^{(7–5)}, [10–8]	(Argentina) Vanesa Furlanetto (France) Amandine Hesse	(Italy) Giulia Gatto-Monticone (Switzerland) Xenia Knoll	(Germany) Dinah Pfizenmaier (Spain) Arantxa Parra Santonja (Germany) Carina Witthöft (France) Estelle Cascino
July 22, 2013	Wrexham, United Kingdom; Hard $25,000; Singles and doubles draws	(Latvia) Diāna Marcinkēviča; 5–7, 7–5, 6–2	(Serbia) Jovana Jakšić	(Netherlands) Indy de Vroome (Romania) Ana Bogdan	(Czech Republic) Kateřina Vaňková (France) Irena Pavlovic (Estonia) Anett Kontaveit (Turkey) Pemra Özgen
July 22, 2013	Wrexham, United Kingdom; Hard $25,000; Singles and doubles draws	(Japan) Kanae Hisami (Japan) Mari Tanaka; 6–3, 7–6^{(7–2)}	(United Kingdom) Anna Smith (United Kingdom) Melanie South	(Netherlands) Indy de Vroome (Romania) Ana Bogdan	(Czech Republic) Kateřina Vaňková (France) Irena Pavlovic (Estonia) Anett Kontaveit (Turkey) Pemra Özgen
July 22, 2013	Bad Waltersdorf, Austria; Clay $10,000; Singles and doubles draws	(Croatia) Adrijana Lekaj; 6–2, 6–4	(Austria) Yvonne Neuwirth	(Slovakia) Zuzana Luknárová (Slovakia) Nikola Vajdová	(Germany) Anna Klasen (Austria) Lisa-Maria Moser (Slovakia) Lenka Juríková (Slovakia) Chantal Škamlová
July 22, 2013	Bad Waltersdorf, Austria; Clay $10,000; Singles and doubles draws	(Czech Republic) Lenka Kunčíková (Czech Republic) Karolína Stuchlá; 6–4, 7–6^{(8–6)}	(Croatia) Adrijana Lekaj (Croatia) Karla Popović	(Slovakia) Zuzana Luknárová (Slovakia) Nikola Vajdová	(Germany) Anna Klasen (Austria) Lisa-Maria Moser (Slovakia) Lenka Juríková (Slovakia) Chantal Škamlová
July 22, 2013	Maaseik, Belgium; Clay $10,000; Singles and doubles draws	(France) Manon Arcangioli; 6–2, 3–6, 7–5	(Belgium) Greetje Minnen	(France) Myrtille Georges (Belgium) Steffi Distelmans	(Netherlands) Bernice van de Velde (Philippines) Katharina Lehnert (France) Marine Partaud (Netherlands) Demi Schuurs
July 22, 2013	Maaseik, Belgium; Clay $10,000; Singles and doubles draws	(Netherlands) Demi Schuurs (Netherlands) Eva Wacanno; 6–2, 4–6, [10–7]	(Netherlands) Bernice van de Velde (Netherlands) Kelly Versteeg	(France) Myrtille Georges (Belgium) Steffi Distelmans	(Netherlands) Bernice van de Velde (Philippines) Katharina Lehnert (France) Marine Partaud (Netherlands) Demi Schuurs
July 22, 2013	São José dos Campos, Brazil; Clay $10,000; Singles and doubles draws	(Paraguay) Montserrat González; 6–3, 6–2	(Brazil) Laura Pigossi	(Peru) Patricia Kú Flores (Brazil) Suellen Abel	(Brazil) Nathaly Kurata (Brazil) Gabriela Cé (Romania) Daiana Negreanu (Brazil) Eduarda Piai
July 22, 2013	São José dos Campos, Brazil; Clay $10,000; Singles and doubles draws	(Argentina) Victoria Bosio (Guatemala) Daniela Schippers; 7–5, 6–4	(Brazil) Laura Pigossi (Argentina) Carolina Zeballos	(Peru) Patricia Kú Flores (Brazil) Suellen Abel	(Brazil) Nathaly Kurata (Brazil) Gabriela Cé (Romania) Daiana Negreanu (Brazil) Eduarda Piai
July 22, 2013	Sharm el-Sheikh, Egypt; Hard $10,000; Singles and doubles draws	(Russia) Anna Morgina; 6–3, 6–2	(Germany) Linda Prenkovic	(Slovakia) Zuzana Zlochová (Sweden) Susanne Celik	(New Zealand) Dianne Hollands (Italy) Giulia Bruzzone (Russia) Alina Mikheeva (United Kingdom) Danielle Konotoptseva
July 22, 2013	Sharm el-Sheikh, Egypt; Hard $10,000; Singles and doubles draws	(Egypt) Mayar Sherif (Slovakia) Zuzana Zlochová; 7–5, 6–3	(India) Sowjanya Bavisetti (India) Rishika Sunkara	(Slovakia) Zuzana Zlochová (Sweden) Susanne Celik	(New Zealand) Dianne Hollands (Italy) Giulia Bruzzone (Russia) Alina Mikheeva (United Kingdom) Danielle Konotoptseva
July 22, 2013	Tampere Open; Tampere, Finland; Clay $10,000; Singles – Doubles	(Denmark) Karen Barbat; 6–1, 7–6^{(7–5)}	(Russia) Liubov Vasilyeva	(Russia) Alena Tarasova (Russia) Anna Koval	(Poland) Paulina Czarnik (Sweden) Beatrice Cedermark (Germany) Nina Zander (Ukraine) Oleksandra Piskun
July 22, 2013	Tampere Open; Tampere, Finland; Clay $10,000; Singles – Doubles	(Germany) Julia Wachaczyk (Germany) Nina Zander; 6–4, 6–4	(Finland) Emma Laine (Finland) Piia Suomalainen	(Russia) Alena Tarasova (Russia) Anna Koval	(Poland) Paulina Czarnik (Sweden) Beatrice Cedermark (Germany) Nina Zander (Ukraine) Oleksandra Piskun
July 22, 2013	Horb am Neckar, Germany; Clay $10,000; Singles and doubles draws	(Germany) Carolin Daniels; 7–5, 6–4	(Netherlands) Cindy Burger	(Czech Republic) Petra Krejsová (Croatia) Iva Primorac	(Czech Republic) Dominika Paterová (Georgia (country)) Sofia Kvatsabaia (Sweden) Hilda Melander (Spain) Olga Sáez Larra
July 22, 2013	Horb am Neckar, Germany; Clay $10,000; Singles and doubles draws	(Russia) Tatiana Kotelnikova (Sweden) Hilda Melander; 6–3, 6–3	(Germany) Carolin Daniels (Germany) Laura Schaeder	(Czech Republic) Petra Krejsová (Croatia) Iva Primorac	(Czech Republic) Dominika Paterová (Georgia (country)) Sofia Kvatsabaia (Sweden) Hilda Melander (Spain) Olga Sáez Larra
July 22, 2013	Rimini, Italy; Clay $10,000; Singles and doubles draws	(Italy) Alice Balducci; 6–2, 6–1	(United States) Sabrina Santamaria	(Italy) Jasmine Paolini (Slovenia) Tjaša Šrimpf	(Armenia) Ani Amiraghyan (Italy) Claudia Giovine (Greece) Despina Papamichail (Italy) Stefania Rubini
July 22, 2013	Rimini, Italy; Clay $10,000; Singles and doubles draws	(United States) Kaitlyn Christian (United States) Sabrina Santamaria; 6–2, 6–1	(Italy) Giulia Gasparri (Switzerland) Lisa Sabino	(Italy) Jasmine Paolini (Slovenia) Tjaša Šrimpf	(Armenia) Ani Amiraghyan (Italy) Claudia Giovine (Greece) Despina Papamichail (Italy) Stefania Rubini
July 22, 2013	Palić, Serbia; Clay $10,000; Singles and doubles draws	(Hungary) Réka-Luca Jani; 6–0, 6–3	(Serbia) Milana Špremo	(Serbia) Marina Kachar (Slovakia) Barbara Kötelesová	(Romania) Cristina Adamescu (Slovakia) Vivien Juhászová (Bulgaria) Borislava Botusharova (Czech Republic) Tereza Malíková
July 22, 2013	Palić, Serbia; Clay $10,000; Singles and doubles draws	(Slovakia) Vivien Juhászová (Czech Republic) Tereza Malíková; 3–6, 6–4, [10–5]	(Serbia) Katarina Adamović (Montenegro) Vladica Babić	(Serbia) Marina Kachar (Slovakia) Barbara Kötelesová	(Romania) Cristina Adamescu (Slovakia) Vivien Juhászová (Bulgaria) Borislava Botusharova (Czech Republic) Tereza Malíková
July 22, 2013	Istanbul, Turkey; Hard $10,000; Singles and doubles draws	(Turkey) Melis Sezer; 6–2, 6–7^{(3–7)}, 6–2	(Turkey) Başak Eraydın	(Russia) Anastasia Frolova (Greece) Agni Stefanou	(Serbia) Dunja Stamenković (Japan) Hiroko Kuwata (Bosnia and Herzegovina) Anita Husarić (United States) Ayla Aksu
July 22, 2013	Istanbul, Turkey; Hard $10,000; Singles and doubles draws	(Bulgaria) Dia Evtimova; Melis Sezer; 7–5, 6–3	(Ukraine) Khristina Kazimova (Ukraine) Vladyslava Zanosiyenko	(Russia) Anastasia Frolova (Greece) Agni Stefanou	(Serbia) Dunja Stamenković (Japan) Hiroko Kuwata (Bosnia and Herzegovina) Anita Husarić (United States) Ayla Aksu
July 22, 2013	Austin, United States; Hard $10,000; Singles and doubles draws	(United States) Lauren Albanese; 7–5, 5–7, 7–6^{(7–4)}	(Bosnia and Herzegovina) Ema Burgić	(United States) Beatrice Capra (United States) Peggy Porter	(United States) Mia King (United States) Ashley Murdock (Japan) Miyu Kato (United States) Alexandra Cercone
July 22, 2013	Austin, United States; Hard $10,000; Singles and doubles draws	(Bosnia and Herzegovina) Ema Burgić (United States) Blair Shankle; 6–1, 7–6^{(7–5)}	(United States) Rachel May Pierson (United States) Madison Westby	(United States) Beatrice Capra (United States) Peggy Porter	(United States) Mia King (United States) Ashley Murdock (Japan) Miyu Kato (United States) Alexandra Cercone
July 29, 2013	Odlum Brown Vancouver Open; Vancouver, Canada; Hard $100,000; Singles – Doubles	(United Kingdom) Johanna Konta; 6–4, 6–2	(Canada) Sharon Fichman	(Japan) Kurumi Nara (Czech Republic) Barbora Záhlavová-Strýcová	(Ukraine) Maryna Zanevska (Canada) Stéphanie Dubois (Russia) Alla Kudryavtseva (Japan) Kimiko Date-Krumm
July 29, 2013	Odlum Brown Vancouver Open; Vancouver, Canada; Hard $100,000; Singles – Doubles	(Canada) Sharon Fichman (Ukraine) Maryna Zanevska; 6–2, 6–2	(United States) Jacqueline Cako (United States) Natalie Pluskota	(Japan) Kurumi Nara (Czech Republic) Barbora Záhlavová-Strýcová	(Ukraine) Maryna Zanevska (Canada) Stéphanie Dubois (Russia) Alla Kudryavtseva (Japan) Kimiko Date-Krumm
July 29, 2013	Viccourt Cup; Donetsk, Ukraine; Hard $75,000; Singles – Doubles	(Ukraine) Elina Svitolina; 3–6, 6–2, 7–6^{(11–9)}	(Hungary) Tímea Babos	(Germany) Dinah Pfizenmaier (Portugal) Maria João Koehler	(Ukraine) Kateryna Kozlova (Russia) Ekaterina Bychkova (Serbia) Aleksandra Krunić (Ukraine) Valentyna Ivakhnenko
July 29, 2013	Viccourt Cup; Donetsk, Ukraine; Hard $75,000; Singles – Doubles	(Ukraine) Yuliya Beygelzimer (Czech Republic) Renata Voráčová; 6–1, 6–4	(Serbia) Vesna Dolonc (Russia) Alexandra Panova	(Germany) Dinah Pfizenmaier (Portugal) Maria João Koehler	(Ukraine) Kateryna Kozlova (Russia) Ekaterina Bychkova (Serbia) Aleksandra Krunić (Ukraine) Valentyna Ivakhnenko
July 29, 2013	Bad Saulgau, Germany; Clay $25,000; Singles and doubles draws	(Hungary) Réka-Luca Jani; 7–6^{(7–4)}, 6–3	(Austria) Patricia Mayr-Achleitner	(Germany) Carina Witthöft (Austria) Yvonne Neuwirth	(Czech Republic) Denisa Allertová (Netherlands) Richèl Hogenkamp (Czech Republic) Kateřina Siniaková (Czech Republic) Barbora Krejčíková
July 29, 2013	Bad Saulgau, Germany; Clay $25,000; Singles and doubles draws	(Romania) Laura-Ioana Andrei (Romania) Elena Bogdan; 6–7^{(11–13)}, 6–4, [10–8]	(Czech Republic) Barbora Krejčíková (Czech Republic) Kateřina Siniaková	(Germany) Carina Witthöft (Austria) Yvonne Neuwirth	(Czech Republic) Denisa Allertová (Netherlands) Richèl Hogenkamp (Czech Republic) Kateřina Siniaková (Czech Republic) Barbora Krejčíková
July 29, 2013	Rovereto, Italy; Clay $15,000; Singles and doubles draws	(Italy) Martina Caregaro; 7–6^{(8–6)}, 6–3	(Ukraine) Sofiya Kovalets	(Greece) Despina Papamichail (Serbia) Natalija Kostić	(France) Alix Collombon (France) Amandine Hesse (Armenia) Ani Amiraghyan (Italy) Stefania Rubini
July 29, 2013	Rovereto, Italy; Clay $15,000; Singles and doubles draws	(Italy) Martina Caregaro (Italy) Anna Floris; 3–6, 6–4, [10–6]	(Ukraine) Olga Ianchuk (Slovakia) Chantal Škamlová	(Greece) Despina Papamichail (Serbia) Natalija Kostić	(France) Alix Collombon (France) Amandine Hesse (Armenia) Ani Amiraghyan (Italy) Stefania Rubini
July 29, 2013	La Paz, Bolivia; Clay $10,000; Singles and doubles draws	(Chile) Cecilia Costa Melgar; 4–6, 6–1, 6–1	(Chile) Macarena Olivares López	(Mexico) Regina Clark (Argentina) Sofía Luini	(Argentina) Guadalupe Moreno (Russia) Anastasia Nefedova (Chile) Ivania Martinich (Argentina) Stephanie Petit
July 29, 2013	La Paz, Bolivia; Clay $10,000; Singles and doubles draws	(Argentina) Guadalupe Moreno (Argentina) Francesca Rescaldani; 6–2, 6–2	(Paraguay) Sara Giménez (Argentina) Stephanie Petit	(Mexico) Regina Clark (Argentina) Sofía Luini	(Argentina) Guadalupe Moreno (Russia) Anastasia Nefedova (Chile) Ivania Martinich (Argentina) Stephanie Petit
July 29, 2013	São Paulo Challenger de Tênis; São Paulo, Brazil; Clay $10,000; Singles – Doubles	(Peru) Bianca Botto; 7–6^{(7–2)}, 5–7, 6–2	(Brazil) Gabriela Cé	(Argentina) Victoria Bosio (Brazil) Nathália Rossi	(Paraguay) Gabriela Ferreira Sanabria (Argentina) Guadalupe Pérez Rojas (Brazil) Ana Clara Duarte (Argentina) Carolina Zeballos
July 29, 2013	São Paulo Challenger de Tênis; São Paulo, Brazil; Clay $10,000; Singles – Doubles	(Brazil) Laura Pigossi (Argentina) Carolina Zeballos; 6–3, 6–4	(Brazil) Nathália Rossi (Brazil) Luisa Stefani	(Argentina) Victoria Bosio (Brazil) Nathália Rossi	(Paraguay) Gabriela Ferreira Sanabria (Argentina) Guadalupe Pérez Rojas (Brazil) Ana Clara Duarte (Argentina) Carolina Zeballos
July 29, 2013	Sharm el-Sheikh, Egypt; Hard $10,000; Singles and doubles draws	(Netherlands) Nicolette van Uitert; 6–4, 5–7, 6–2	(Germany) Linda Prenkovic	(Italy) Giulia Bruzzone (Russia) Liudmila Vasilyeva	(France) Pauline Payet (Ukraine) Anastasia Kharchenko (New Zealand) Dianne Hollands (Egypt) Mayar Sherif
July 29, 2013	Sharm el-Sheikh, Egypt; Hard $10,000; Singles and doubles draws	(New Zealand) Dianne Hollands (Ukraine) Anastasia Kharchenko; 3–6, 6–4, [10–8]	(Netherlands) Kim Kilsdonk (Netherlands) Nicolette van Uitert	(Italy) Giulia Bruzzone (Russia) Liudmila Vasilyeva	(France) Pauline Payet (Ukraine) Anastasia Kharchenko (New Zealand) Dianne Hollands (Egypt) Mayar Sherif
July 29, 2013	Savitaipale, Finland; Clay $10,000; Singles and doubles draws	(Denmark) Karen Barbat; 7–5, 6–3	(Russia) Antonina Lysakova	(Sweden) Beatrice Cedermark (Russia) Anastasiya Komardina	(Russia) Daria Mironova (Hungary) Naomi Totka (Russia) Julia Valetova (Norway) Emma Flood
July 29, 2013	Savitaipale, Finland; Clay $10,000; Singles and doubles draws	(Finland) Emma Laine (Finland) Piia Suomalainen; 6–4, 6–4	(Russia) Anastasiya Komardina (Lithuania) Akvilė Paražinskaitė	(Sweden) Beatrice Cedermark (Russia) Anastasiya Komardina	(Russia) Daria Mironova (Hungary) Naomi Totka (Russia) Julia Valetova (Norway) Emma Flood
July 29, 2013	Astana, Kazakhstan; Hard $10,000; Singles and doubles draws	(Russia) Ksenia Kirillova; 6–4, 4–6, 6–1	(Kazakhstan) Asiya Dair	(Kazakhstan) Yelena Nemchen (Russia) Yana Sizikova	(Japan) Yumi Nakano (Uzbekistan) Vlada Ekshibarova (Russia) Eugeniya Pashkova (Kazakhstan) Alexandra Grinchishina
July 29, 2013	Astana, Kazakhstan; Hard $10,000; Singles and doubles draws	(Russia) Vera Bessonova (Russia) Eugeniya Pashkova; 3–6, 6–1, [12–10]	(Russia) Maya Gaverova (Kazakhstan) Yelena Nemchen	(Kazakhstan) Yelena Nemchen (Russia) Yana Sizikova	(Japan) Yumi Nakano (Uzbekistan) Vlada Ekshibarova (Russia) Eugeniya Pashkova (Kazakhstan) Alexandra Grinchishina
July 29, 2013	Izmir, Turkey; Hard $10,000; Singles and doubles draws	(Estonia) Anett Kontaveit; 3–6, 7–6^{(7–4)}, 6–0	(Turkey) Başak Eraydın	(Bulgaria) Dia Evtimova (Japan) Erika Takao	(Russia) Polina Leykina (Chinese Taipei) Lee Ya-hsuan (Russia) Anastasia Frolova (Turkey) Hülya Esen
July 29, 2013	Izmir, Turkey; Hard $10,000; Singles and doubles draws	(Estonia) Anett Kontaveit (Russia) Polina Leykina; 6–4, 7–5	(Turkey) Hülya Esen (Turkey) Lütfiye Esen	(Bulgaria) Dia Evtimova (Japan) Erika Takao	(Russia) Polina Leykina (Chinese Taipei) Lee Ya-hsuan (Russia) Anastasia Frolova (Turkey) Hülya Esen
July 29, 2013	Nottingham, United Kingdom; Hard $10,000; Singles and doubles draws	(Japan) Miyabi Inoue; 7–6^{(7–5)}, 6–2	(Japan) Yuka Higuchi	(United Kingdom) Lucy Brown (Japan) Kanae Hisami	(United Kingdom) Pippa Horn (Republic of Ireland) Amy Bowtell (United Kingdom) Melanie South (France) Océane Adam
July 29, 2013	Nottingham, United Kingdom; Hard $10,000; Singles and doubles draws	(United Kingdom) Anna Smith (United Kingdom) Melanie South; 6–4, 6–2	(United Kingdom) Daneika Borthwick (United Kingdom) Anna Fitzpatrick	(United Kingdom) Lucy Brown (Japan) Kanae Hisami	(United Kingdom) Pippa Horn (Republic of Ireland) Amy Bowtell (United Kingdom) Melanie South (France) Océane Adam
July 29, 2013	Fort Worth, United States; Hard $10,000; Singles and doubles draws	(United States) Lauren Embree; 3–6, 6–1, 3–1, ret.	(Japan) Miyu Kato	(United States) Catherine Harrison (United States) Lauren Herring	(United States) Veronica Corning (United States) Danielle Mills (United States) Nadia Echeverria Alam (Bosnia and Herzegovina) Ema Burgić
July 29, 2013	Fort Worth, United States; Hard $10,000; Singles and doubles draws	(United States) Roxanne Ellison (United States) Sierra Ellison; 6–3, 6–4	(United States) Lauren Herring (United States) Mia King	(United States) Catherine Harrison (United States) Lauren Herring	(United States) Veronica Corning (United States) Danielle Mills (United States) Nadia Echeverria Alam (Bosnia and Herzegovina) Ema Burgić

=== August ===
Week of	Tournament	Winner	Runners-up	Semifinalists	Quarterfinalists
August 5, 2013	Koksijde, Belgium; Clay $25,000; Singles and doubles draws	(Netherlands) Richèl Hogenkamp; 6–4, 6–1	(France) Irena Pavlovic	(Netherlands) Lesley Kerkhove (Netherlands) Cindy Burger	(Czech Republic) Tereza Smitková (Ukraine) Sofiya Kovalets (Spain) Beatriz García Vidagany (India) Ankita Raina
August 5, 2013	Koksijde, Belgium; Clay $25,000; Singles and doubles draws	(Belgium) Magali Kempen (Belgium) Nicky Van Dyck; 6–3, 7–6^{(7–3)}	(Belgium) Marie Benoît (Belgium) Kimberley Zimmermann	(Netherlands) Lesley Kerkhove (Netherlands) Cindy Burger	(Czech Republic) Tereza Smitková (Ukraine) Sofiya Kovalets (Spain) Beatriz García Vidagany (India) Ankita Raina
August 5, 2013	Hechingen, Germany; Clay $25,000; Singles and doubles draws	(Germany) Carina Witthöft; 6–1, 6–4	(France) Laura Thorpe	(Poland) Katarzyna Kawa (Germany) Anne Schäfer	(Italy) Anastasia Grymalska (Italy) Alberta Brianti (Slovenia) Maša Zec Peškirič (Italy) Giulia Gatto-Monticone
August 5, 2013	Hechingen, Germany; Clay $25,000; Singles and doubles draws	(Czech Republic) Barbora Krejčíková (Czech Republic) Kateřina Siniaková; 6–1, 6–4	(Romania) Laura-Ioana Andrei (France) Laura Thorpe	(Poland) Katarzyna Kawa (Germany) Anne Schäfer	(Italy) Anastasia Grymalska (Italy) Alberta Brianti (Slovenia) Maša Zec Peškirič (Italy) Giulia Gatto-Monticone
August 5, 2013	Moscow, Russia; Clay $25,000; Singles and doubles draws	(Ukraine) Anastasiya Vasylyeva; 6–2, 6–3	(Russia) Daria Mironova	(Russia) Mayya Katsitadze (Russia) Polina Vinogradova	(Russia) Marina Melnikova (Serbia) Tamara Čurović (Ukraine) Valentyna Ivakhnenko (Russia) Margarita Gasparyan
August 5, 2013	Moscow, Russia; Clay $25,000; Singles and doubles draws	(Ukraine) Alona Fomina (Ukraine) Anna Shkudun; 6–2, 7–5	(Uzbekistan) Albina Khabibulina (Ukraine) Anastasiya Vasylyeva	(Russia) Mayya Katsitadze (Russia) Polina Vinogradova	(Russia) Marina Melnikova (Serbia) Tamara Čurović (Ukraine) Valentyna Ivakhnenko (Russia) Margarita Gasparyan
August 5, 2013	Izmir, Turkey; Hard $25,000; Singles and doubles draws	(Croatia) Ana Vrljić; 6–1, 6–3	(Poland) Katarzyna Piter	(Montenegro) Danka Kovinić (Japan) Chiaki Okadaue	(Germany) Dinah Pfizenmaier (Romania) Andreea Mitu (Russia) Polina Leykina (Turkey) Çağla Büyükakçay
August 5, 2013	Izmir, Turkey; Hard $25,000; Singles and doubles draws	(Serbia) Aleksandra Krunić (Poland) Katarzyna Piter; 6–2, 6–2	(United States) Kristi Boxx (New Zealand) Abigail Guthrie	(Montenegro) Danka Kovinić (Japan) Chiaki Okadaue	(Germany) Dinah Pfizenmaier (Romania) Andreea Mitu (Russia) Polina Leykina (Turkey) Çağla Büyükakçay
August 5, 2013	Landisville, United States; Hard $25,000; Singles and doubles draws	(United States) Madison Brengle; 6–2, 6–0	(Australia) Olivia Rogowska	(United States) Jennifer Elie (United States) Robin Anderson	(Japan) Shuko Aoyama (Croatia) Ajla Tomljanović (United Kingdom) Johanna Konta (United Kingdom) Tara Moore
August 5, 2013	Landisville, United States; Hard $25,000; Singles and doubles draws	(Australia) Monique Adamczak (Australia) Olivia Rogowska; 6–2, 6–3	(South Africa) Chanel Simmonds (United Kingdom) Emily Webley-Smith	(United States) Jennifer Elie (United States) Robin Anderson	(Japan) Shuko Aoyama (Croatia) Ajla Tomljanović (United Kingdom) Johanna Konta (United Kingdom) Tara Moore
August 5, 2013	Vienna, Austria; Clay $10,000; Singles and doubles draws	(Slovakia) Petra Uberalová; 4–6, 6–2, 6–2	(Czech Republic) Kateřina Kramperová	(Bulgaria) Isabella Shinikova (Slovakia) Michaela Pochabová	(Slovakia) Chantal Škamlová (Slovakia) Rebecca Šramková (Slovakia) Nikola Vajdová (Austria) Janina Toljan
August 5, 2013	Vienna, Austria; Clay $10,000; Singles and doubles draws	(Slovakia) Michaela Pochabová (Slovakia) Rebecca Šramková; 7–5, 6–2	(Japan) Hiroko Kuwata (Japan) Hirono Watanabe	(Bulgaria) Isabella Shinikova (Slovakia) Michaela Pochabová	(Slovakia) Chantal Škamlová (Slovakia) Rebecca Šramková (Slovakia) Nikola Vajdová (Austria) Janina Toljan
August 5, 2013	Santa Cruz, Bolivia; Clay $10,000; Singles and doubles draws	(Argentina) Guadalupe Moreno; 6–0, 0–6, 6–2	(Argentina) Guadalupe Pérez Rojas	(Chile) Cecilia Costa Melgar (Chile) Ivania Martinich	(Chile) Andrea Koch Benvenuto (Paraguay) Camila Giangreco Campiz (Chile) Macarena Olivares López (Brazil) Nathália Rossi
August 5, 2013	Santa Cruz, Bolivia; Clay $10,000; Singles and doubles draws	(Bolivia) María Fernanda Álvarez Terán (Bolivia) Daniela Ruiz; 7–5, 6–3	(Chile) Cecilia Costa Melgar (Paraguay) Camila Giangreco Campiz	(Chile) Cecilia Costa Melgar (Chile) Ivania Martinich	(Chile) Andrea Koch Benvenuto (Paraguay) Camila Giangreco Campiz (Chile) Macarena Olivares López (Brazil) Nathália Rossi
August 5, 2013	Sharm el-Sheikh, Egypt; Hard $10,000; Singles and doubles draws	(India) Sowjanya Bavisetti; 6–1, 7–6^{(7–1)}	(Ukraine) Anastasia Kharchenko	(Italy) Alessia Camplone (India) Rishika Sunkara	(Switzerland) Sara Ottomano (Germany) Linda Prenkovic (China) Gai Ao (New Zealand) Dianne Hollands
August 5, 2013	Sharm el-Sheikh, Egypt; Hard $10,000; Singles and doubles draws	(Netherlands) Kim Kilsdonk (Netherlands) Nicolette van Uitert; 6–1, 6–0	(China) Gai Ao (Russia) Ekaterina Lavrikova	(Italy) Alessia Camplone (India) Rishika Sunkara	(Switzerland) Sara Ottomano (Germany) Linda Prenkovic (China) Gai Ao (New Zealand) Dianne Hollands
August 5, 2013	Astana, Kazakhstan; Hard $10,000; Singles and doubles draws	(Russia) Eugeniya Pashkova; 6–1, 6–1	(Kazakhstan) Asiya Dair	(Japan) Yumi Nakano (Russia) Maya Gaverova	(Kazakhstan) Alexandra Grinchishina (Kazakhstan) Dariya Berezhinaya (Japan) Yoshimi Kawasaki (Kazakhstan) Ekaterina Klyueva
August 5, 2013	Astana, Kazakhstan; Hard $10,000; Singles and doubles draws	(Russia) Vera Bessonova (Russia) Eugeniya Pashkova; 6–4, 3–6, [10–7]	(Japan) Yoshimi Kawasaki (Japan) Yumi Nakano	(Japan) Yumi Nakano (Russia) Maya Gaverova	(Kazakhstan) Alexandra Grinchishina (Kazakhstan) Dariya Berezhinaya (Japan) Yoshimi Kawasaki (Kazakhstan) Ekaterina Klyueva
August 5, 2013	Arad, Romania; Clay $10,000; Singles and doubles draws	(Russia) Anastasiya Komardina; 6–3, 6–2	(North Macedonia) Lina Gjorcheska	(Croatia) Ema Mikulčić (Romania) Ioana Loredana Roșca	(Romania) Patricia Lancranjan (Romania) Nicoleta-Cătălina Dascălu (Hungary) Lilla Barzó (Romania) Stefana Andrei
August 5, 2013	Arad, Romania; Clay $10,000; Singles and doubles draws	(Romania) Irina Maria Bara (Romania) Diana Buzean; 6–4, 6–3	(Romania) Cristina Adamescu (Romania) Ana Bianca Mihăilă	(Croatia) Ema Mikulčić (Romania) Ioana Loredana Roșca	(Romania) Patricia Lancranjan (Romania) Nicoleta-Cătălina Dascălu (Hungary) Lilla Barzó (Romania) Stefana Andrei
August 5, 2013	Pirot, Serbia; Clay $10,000; Singles and doubles draws	(Greece) Valentini Grammatikopoulou; 6–1, 6–4	(Netherlands) Eva Wacanno	(Serbia) Katarina Adamović (Montenegro) Vladica Babić	(Slovenia) Pia Čuk (Bulgaria) Borislava Botusharova (Serbia) Milana Špremo (Serbia) Marina Kachar
August 5, 2013	Pirot, Serbia; Clay $10,000; Singles and doubles draws	(Serbia) Katarina Adamović (Montenegro) Vladica Babić; 6–0, 6–3	(Bulgaria) Borislava Botusharova (Bulgaria) Ani Vangelova	(Serbia) Katarina Adamović (Montenegro) Vladica Babić	(Slovenia) Pia Čuk (Bulgaria) Borislava Botusharova (Serbia) Milana Špremo (Serbia) Marina Kachar
August 12, 2013	Trofeul Popeci; Craiova, Romania; Clay $50,000+H; Singles – Doubles	(Slovakia) Kristína Kučová; 7–5, 3–6, 6–4	(Italy) Alberta Brianti	(Croatia) Ana Konjuh (Austria) Patricia Mayr-Achleitner	(Spain) Estrella Cabeza Candela (Spain) Beatriz García Vidagany (France) Constance Sibille (Poland) Katarzyna Kawa
August 12, 2013	Trofeul Popeci; Craiova, Romania; Clay $50,000+H; Singles – Doubles	(Italy) Alice Balducci (Poland) Katarzyna Kawa; 3–6, 7–6^{(7–3)}, [10–8]	(Romania) Diana Buzean (Germany) Christina Shakovets	(Croatia) Ana Konjuh (Austria) Patricia Mayr-Achleitner	(Spain) Estrella Cabeza Candela (Spain) Beatriz García Vidagany (France) Constance Sibille (Poland) Katarzyna Kawa
August 12, 2013	Kazan Summer Cup; Kazan, Russia; Hard $50,000; Singles – Doubles	(Ukraine) Lyudmyla Kichenok; 6–2, 2–6, 6–2	(Ukraine) Valentyna Ivakhnenko	(Ukraine) Anastasiya Vasylyeva (Russia) Veronika Kudermetova	(Russia) Evgeniya Rodina (Ukraine) Veronika Kapshay (Russia) Marina Melnikova (Kazakhstan) Anna Danilina
August 12, 2013	Kazan Summer Cup; Kazan, Russia; Hard $50,000; Singles – Doubles	(Russia) Veronika Kudermetova (Russia) Evgeniya Rodina; 5–7, 6–0, [10–8]	(Russia) Alexandra Artamonova (Czech Republic) Martina Borecká	(Ukraine) Anastasiya Vasylyeva (Russia) Veronika Kudermetova	(Russia) Evgeniya Rodina (Ukraine) Veronika Kapshay (Russia) Marina Melnikova (Kazakhstan) Anna Danilina
August 12, 2013	Westende, Belgium; Hard $25,000; Singles and doubles draws	(Czech Republic) Kateřina Siniaková; 6–1, 6–3	(Czech Republic) Kateřina Vaňková	(Italy) Giulia Gatto-Monticone (Czech Republic) Denisa Allertová	(Germany) Anna-Lena Friedsam (India) Ankita Raina (Belgium) Ysaline Bonaventure (United States) Bernarda Pera
August 12, 2013	Westende, Belgium; Hard $25,000; Singles and doubles draws	(Argentina) Tatiana Búa (Chile) Daniela Seguel; 6–3, 5–7, [11–9]	(Germany) Antonia Lottner (Latvia) Diāna Marcinkēviča	(Italy) Giulia Gatto-Monticone (Czech Republic) Denisa Allertová	(Germany) Anna-Lena Friedsam (India) Ankita Raina (Belgium) Ysaline Bonaventure (United States) Bernarda Pera
August 12, 2013	Innsbruck, Austria; Clay $10,000; Singles and doubles draws	(Sweden) Hilda Melander; 6–2, 6–3	(Croatia) Tena Lukas	(Germany) Vivian Heisen (Italy) Francesca Fusinato	(Czech Republic) Kateřina Kramperová (Slovakia) Petra Uberalová (Croatia) Iva Primorac (Bosnia and Herzegovina) Anita Husarić
August 12, 2013	Innsbruck, Austria; Clay $10,000; Singles and doubles draws	(United Kingdom) Lucy Brown (Sweden) Hilda Melander; 3–6, 6–3, [10–7]	(Slovenia) Nastja Kolar (Slovenia) Polona Reberšak	(Germany) Vivian Heisen (Italy) Francesca Fusinato	(Czech Republic) Kateřina Kramperová (Slovakia) Petra Uberalová (Croatia) Iva Primorac (Bosnia and Herzegovina) Anita Husarić
August 12, 2013	Brčko, Bosnia and Herzegovina; Clay $10,000; Singles and doubles draws	(Serbia) Milana Špremo; 1–6, 7–5, 6–3	(Czech Republic) Martina Kubičíková	(Bosnia and Herzegovina) Katarina Jokić (Bulgaria) Aleksandra Karamanoleva	(North Macedonia) Lina Gjorcheska (Serbia) Dunja Šunkić (Slovakia) Natália Vajdová (Slovenia) Tjaša Šrimpf
August 12, 2013	Brčko, Bosnia and Herzegovina; Clay $10,000; Singles and doubles draws	(North Macedonia) Lina Gjorcheska (Bulgaria) Dalia Zafirova; 7–5, 6–1	(Bosnia and Herzegovina) Katarina Jokić (Serbia) Nikolina Jović	(Bosnia and Herzegovina) Katarina Jokić (Bulgaria) Aleksandra Karamanoleva	(North Macedonia) Lina Gjorcheska (Serbia) Dunja Šunkić (Slovakia) Natália Vajdová (Slovenia) Tjaša Šrimpf
August 12, 2013	Sharm el-Sheikh, Egypt; Hard $10,000; Singles and doubles draws	(France) Clothilde de Bernardi; 6–0, 6–1	(Ukraine) Anastasia Kharchenko	(France) Pauline Payet (Belgium) Elke Lemmens	(Japan) Yuriko Miyazaki (Belgium) Michelle Werbrouck (Italy) Alessia Camplone (Russia) Ksenia Dmitrieva
August 12, 2013	Sharm el-Sheikh, Egypt; Hard $10,000; Singles and doubles draws	(Belgium) Elke Lemmens (Germany) Linda Prenkovic; 6–0, 7–6^{(10–8)}	(Sweden) Susanne Celik (Japan) Sanae Ohta	(France) Pauline Payet (Belgium) Elke Lemmens	(Japan) Yuriko Miyazaki (Belgium) Michelle Werbrouck (Italy) Alessia Camplone (Russia) Ksenia Dmitrieva
August 12, 2013	Ratingen, Germany; Clay $10,000; Singles and doubles draws	(Germany) Julia Wachaczyk; 6–3, 4–6, 6–4	(Germany) Tamara Korpatsch	(Germany) Franziska König (Japan) Yuuki Tanaka	(Germany) Bianca Koch (Spain) Lucía Cervera Vázquez (Germany) Carolin Daniels (Germany) Tayisiya Morderger
August 12, 2013	Ratingen, Germany; Clay $10,000; Singles and doubles draws	(Germany) Carolin Daniels (Germany) Anna Klasen; 7–5, 6–2	(Netherlands) Bernice van de Velde (Australia) Karolina Wlodarczak	(Germany) Franziska König (Japan) Yuuki Tanaka	(Germany) Bianca Koch (Spain) Lucía Cervera Vázquez (Germany) Carolin Daniels (Germany) Tayisiya Morderger
August 12, 2013	Locri, Italy; Clay $10,000; Singles and doubles draws	(Italy) Jasmine Paolini; 6–1, 7–5	(France) Jade Suvrijn	(Italy) Federica Di Sarra (Netherlands) Kelly Versteeg	(Italy) Claudia Giovine (Italy) Giorgia Pinto (Italy) Alice Matteucci (Greece) Despina Papamichail
August 12, 2013	Locri, Italy; Clay $10,000; Singles and doubles draws	(Italy) Federica Di Sarra (Greece) Despina Papamichail; 6–3, 3–6, [10–4]	(Italy) Alice Matteucci (Italy) Camila Rosatello	(Italy) Federica Di Sarra (Netherlands) Kelly Versteeg	(Italy) Claudia Giovine (Italy) Giorgia Pinto (Italy) Alice Matteucci (Greece) Despina Papamichail
August 12, 2013	Uşak, Turkey; Hard $10,000; Singles and doubles draws	(Japan) Hiroko Kuwata; 7–6^{(7–3)}, 6–2	(Germany) Michaela Frlicka	(Kazakhstan) Alexandra Grinchishina (Japan) Yumi Miyazaki	(Ukraine) Anastasiya Shestakova (Ukraine) Sofiko Kadzhaya (Kazakhstan) Ekaterina Klyueva (Australia) Nives Baric
August 12, 2013	Uşak, Turkey; Hard $10,000; Singles and doubles draws	(Australia) Nicole Collie (Australia) Leah Daw; 6–3, 6–4	(Germany) Michaela Frlicka (Slovakia) Stanislava Hrozenská	(Kazakhstan) Alexandra Grinchishina (Japan) Yumi Miyazaki	(Ukraine) Anastasiya Shestakova (Ukraine) Sofiko Kadzhaya (Kazakhstan) Ekaterina Klyueva (Australia) Nives Baric
August 19, 2013	Saint Petersburg, Russia; Clay $25,000; Singles and doubles draws	(Russia) Polina Vinogradova; 6–4, 7–6^{(7–2)}	(Georgia (country)) Sofia Shapatava	(Ukraine) Sofiya Kovalets (Russia) Daria Mironova	(Ukraine) Ganna Poznikhirenko (Russia) Marina Melnikova (Brazil) Laura Pigossi (Ukraine) Valentyna Ivakhnenko
August 19, 2013	Saint Petersburg, Russia; Clay $25,000; Singles and doubles draws	(Russia) Victoria Kan (Ukraine) Ganna Poznikhirenko; 6–2, 6–0	(Poland) Justyna Jegiołka (Thailand) Noppawan Lertcheewakarn	(Ukraine) Sofiya Kovalets (Russia) Daria Mironova	(Ukraine) Ganna Poznikhirenko (Russia) Marina Melnikova (Brazil) Laura Pigossi (Ukraine) Valentyna Ivakhnenko
August 19, 2013	Braunschweig, Germany; Clay $15,000; Singles and doubles draws	(Germany) Kristina Barrois; 4–6, 6–2, 6–3	(France) Myrtille Georges	(Germany) Sina Haas (Italy) Gaia Sanesi	(Spain) Aliona Bolsova Zadoinov (Spain) Inés Ferrer Suárez (Czech Republic) Tereza Malíková (Netherlands) Lisanne van Riet
August 19, 2013	Braunschweig, Germany; Clay $15,000; Singles and doubles draws	(France) Clothilde de Bernardi (Bulgaria) Isabella Shinikova; 3–6, 6–1, [10–8]	(Czech Republic) Tereza Malíková (Czech Republic) Tereza Smitková	(Germany) Sina Haas (Italy) Gaia Sanesi	(Spain) Aliona Bolsova Zadoinov (Spain) Inés Ferrer Suárez (Czech Republic) Tereza Malíková (Netherlands) Lisanne van Riet
August 19, 2013	San Luis Potosí, Mexico; Hard $15,000; Singles and doubles draws	(Croatia) Jelena Pandžić; 6–4, 6–4	(Mexico) Ana Sofía Sánchez	(United States) Jennifer Elie (Mexico) Marcela Zacarías	(Trinidad and Tobago) Yolande Leacock (United States) Karina Kristina Vyrlan (United States) Casey Robinson (Mexico) Carolina Betancourt
August 19, 2013	San Luis Potosí, Mexico; Hard $15,000; Singles and doubles draws	(Mexico) Carolina Betancourt (Mexico) Camila Fuentes; 6–2, 6–3	(Mexico) Ana Sofía Sánchez (Mexico) Marcela Zacarías	(United States) Jennifer Elie (Mexico) Marcela Zacarías	(Trinidad and Tobago) Yolande Leacock (United States) Karina Kristina Vyrlan (United States) Casey Robinson (Mexico) Carolina Betancourt
August 19, 2013	Pörtschach, Austria; Clay $10,000; Singles and doubles draws	(Italy) Gioia Barbieri; 6–2, 6–3	(Slovenia) Nastja Kolar	(Czech Republic) Diana Šumová (Slovenia) Polona Reberšak	(Italy) Giulia Sussarello (Austria) Pia König (Austria) Yvonne Neuwirth (Croatia) Tena Lukas
August 19, 2013	Pörtschach, Austria; Clay $10,000; Singles and doubles draws	(Slovenia) Nastja Kolar (Slovenia) Polona Reberšak; 6–0, 2–6, [10–4]	(Italy) Gioia Barbieri (Italy) Giulia Sussarello	(Czech Republic) Diana Šumová (Slovenia) Polona Reberšak	(Italy) Giulia Sussarello (Austria) Pia König (Austria) Yvonne Neuwirth (Croatia) Tena Lukas
August 19, 2013	Wanfercée-Baulet, Belgium; Clay $10,000; Singles and doubles draws	(Israel) Deniz Khazaniuk; 6–3, 7–6^{(8–6)}	(Ukraine) Oleksandra Korashvili	(Chile) Daniela Seguel (Argentina) Tatiana Búa	(Belgium) Kimberley Zimmermann (France) Amandine Hesse (France) Manon Arcangioli (Belgium) Marie Benoît
August 19, 2013	Wanfercée-Baulet, Belgium; Clay $10,000; Singles and doubles draws	(Argentina) Tatiana Búa (Chile) Daniela Seguel; 6–4, 6–2	(France) Amandine Hesse (Israel) Deniz Khazaniuk	(Chile) Daniela Seguel (Argentina) Tatiana Búa	(Belgium) Kimberley Zimmermann (France) Amandine Hesse (France) Manon Arcangioli (Belgium) Marie Benoît
August 19, 2013	Prague, Czech Republic; Clay $10,000; Singles and doubles draws	(Hungary) Réka-Luca Jani; 7–5, 6–1	(Czech Republic) Zuzana Zálabská	(Czech Republic) Sandra Záhlavová (Czech Republic) Kateřina Kramperová	(Czech Republic) Pernilla Mendesová (Slovakia) Lenka Juríková (Czech Republic) Eva Rutarová (Czech Republic) Sandra Hönigová
August 19, 2013	Prague, Czech Republic; Clay $10,000; Singles and doubles draws	(Czech Republic) Lenka Kunčíková (Czech Republic) Karolína Stuchlá; 6–3, 7–5	(Czech Republic) Kristýna Hrabalová (Czech Republic) Marie Mayerová	(Czech Republic) Sandra Záhlavová (Czech Republic) Kateřina Kramperová	(Czech Republic) Pernilla Mendesová (Slovakia) Lenka Juríková (Czech Republic) Eva Rutarová (Czech Republic) Sandra Hönigová
August 19, 2013	Sharm el-Sheikh, Egypt; Hard $10,000; Singles and doubles draws	(Russia) Anna Morgina; 6–3, 1–6, 7–6^{(7–2)}	(Sweden) Susanne Celik	(Russia) Alina Mikheeva (Ukraine) Anastasia Kharchenko	(Italy) Valeria Prosperi (Russia) Julia Valetova (China) Gai Ao (Germany) Linda Prenkovic
August 19, 2013	Sharm el-Sheikh, Egypt; Hard $10,000; Singles and doubles draws	(Czech Republic) Nikola Horáková (Russia) Julia Valetova; 3–6, 7–6^{(7–2)}, [11–9]	(Egypt) Magy Aziz (China) Gai Ao	(Russia) Alina Mikheeva (Ukraine) Anastasia Kharchenko	(Italy) Valeria Prosperi (Russia) Julia Valetova (China) Gai Ao (Germany) Linda Prenkovic
August 19, 2013	New Delhi, India; Hard $10,000; Singles and doubles draws	(Hong Kong) Katherine Ip; 6–3, 6–3	(India) Shweta Rana	(India) Prarthana Thombare (India) Rishika Sunkara	(Israel) Keren Shlomo (India) Rushmi Chakravarthi (India) Bhuvana Kalva (Australia) Julia Moriarty
August 19, 2013	New Delhi, India; Hard $10,000; Singles and doubles draws	(Japan) Akari Inoue (India) Prarthana Thombare; 6–1, 6–4	(Sweden) Matilda Hamlin (India) Shweta Rana	(India) Prarthana Thombare (India) Rishika Sunkara	(Israel) Keren Shlomo (India) Rushmi Chakravarthi (India) Bhuvana Kalva (Australia) Julia Moriarty
August 19, 2013	Enschede, Netherlands; Clay $10,000; Singles and doubles draws	(Germany) Tayisiya Morderger; 6–4, 6–7^{(3–7)}, 6–2	(Germany) Nina Zander	(Netherlands) Valeria Podda (Germany) Lisa Matviyenko	(United States) Bernarda Pera (Belarus) Sviatlana Pirazhenka (Netherlands) Eva Wacanno (Germany) Bianca Koch
August 19, 2013	Enschede, Netherlands; Clay $10,000; Singles and doubles draws	(United States) Bernarda Pera (Belarus) Sviatlana Pirazhenka; 6–2, 6–1	(Netherlands) Anna Katalina Alzate Esmurzaeva (Netherlands) Rosalie van der Hoek	(Netherlands) Valeria Podda (Germany) Lisa Matviyenko	(United States) Bernarda Pera (Belarus) Sviatlana Pirazhenka (Netherlands) Eva Wacanno (Germany) Bianca Koch
August 19, 2013	Bucharest, Romania; Clay $10,000; Singles and doubles draws	(Netherlands) Cindy Burger; 6–2, 6–3	(Romania) Cristina Adamescu	(Romania) Patricia Maria Țig (Romania) Laura-Ioana Andrei	(Bulgaria) Dia Evtimova (Romania) Raluca Elena Platon (Romania) Irina Maria Bara (Spain) Arabela Fernández Rabener
August 19, 2013	Bucharest, Romania; Clay $10,000; Singles and doubles draws	(Romania) Irina Maria Bara (Romania) Ioana Loredana Roșca; 6–4, 6–4	(Romania) Raluca Elena Platon (Romania) Patricia Maria Țig	(Romania) Patricia Maria Țig (Romania) Laura-Ioana Andrei	(Bulgaria) Dia Evtimova (Romania) Raluca Elena Platon (Romania) Irina Maria Bara (Spain) Arabela Fernández Rabener
August 19, 2013	Izmir, Turkey; Hard $10,000; Singles and doubles draws	(Turkey) İpek Soylu; 7–5, 6–3	(Netherlands) Gabriela van de Graaf	(Hungary) Szabina Szlavikovics (Ukraine) Marianna Zakarlyuk	(Japan) Kanami Tsuji (Russia) Natalia Vikhlyantseva (Australia) Nives Baric (Greece) Agni Stefanou
August 19, 2013	Izmir, Turkey; Hard $10,000; Singles and doubles draws	(Ukraine) Khristina Kazimova (Germany) Christina Shakovets; 6–4, 6–1	(Turkey) İpek Soylu (Bulgaria) Julia Stamatova	(Hungary) Szabina Szlavikovics (Ukraine) Marianna Zakarlyuk	(Japan) Kanami Tsuji (Russia) Natalia Vikhlyantseva (Australia) Nives Baric (Greece) Agni Stefanou
August 26, 2013	Tatarstan Open; Kazan, Russia; Hard $50,000+H; Singles – Doubles	(Germany) Anna-Lena Friedsam; 6–2, 6–3	(Russia) Marta Sirotkina	(Ukraine) Nadiia Kichenok (Ukraine) Kateryna Kozlova	(Czech Republic) Tereza Martincová (Thailand) Noppawan Lertcheewakarn (Ukraine) Lyudmyla Kichenok (Czech Republic) Kateřina Vaňková
August 26, 2013	Tatarstan Open; Kazan, Russia; Hard $50,000+H; Singles – Doubles	(Ukraine) Valentyna Ivakhnenko (Ukraine) Kateryna Kozlova; 6–4, 6–1	(Turkey) Başak Eraydın (Ukraine) Veronika Kapshay	(Ukraine) Nadiia Kichenok (Ukraine) Kateryna Kozlova	(Czech Republic) Tereza Martincová (Thailand) Noppawan Lertcheewakarn (Ukraine) Lyudmyla Kichenok (Czech Republic) Kateřina Vaňková
August 26, 2013	Fleurus, Belgium; Clay $25,000; Singles and doubles draws	(Netherlands) Arantxa Rus; 6–3, 6–2	(Latvia) Diāna Marcinkēviča	(Slovakia) Kristína Kučová (Bulgaria) Elitsa Kostova	(Netherlands) Lesley Kerkhove (Chile) Daniela Seguel (Italy) Giulia Gatto-Monticone (France) Myrtille Georges
August 26, 2013	Fleurus, Belgium; Clay $25,000; Singles and doubles draws	(Russia) Irina Khromacheva (Latvia) Diāna Marcinkēviča; 6–4, 6–3	(Brazil) Gabriela Cé (Chile) Daniela Seguel	(Slovakia) Kristína Kučová (Bulgaria) Elitsa Kostova	(Netherlands) Lesley Kerkhove (Chile) Daniela Seguel (Italy) Giulia Gatto-Monticone (France) Myrtille Georges
August 26, 2013	Tsukuba, Japan; Hard $25,000; Singles and doubles draws	(Japan) Nao Hibino; 6–4, 7–6^{(7–2)}	(Japan) Erika Sema	(Japan) Miyu Kato (Serbia) Doroteja Erić	(Japan) Riko Sawayanagi (China) Yang Zi (China) Zhao Di (South Korea) Han Na-lae
August 26, 2013	Tsukuba, Japan; Hard $25,000; Singles and doubles draws	(Chinese Taipei) Chan Chin-wei (Chinese Taipei) Hsu Wen-hsin; 6–2, 6–1	(Chinese Taipei) Lee Ya-hsuan (Japan) Yumi Miyazaki	(Japan) Miyu Kato (Serbia) Doroteja Erić	(Japan) Riko Sawayanagi (China) Yang Zi (China) Zhao Di (South Korea) Han Na-lae
August 26, 2013	Mamaia, Romania; Clay $25,000; Singles and doubles draws	(Romania) Cristina Dinu; 6–7^{(5–7)}, 7–5, 6–0	(Netherlands) Cindy Burger	(Austria) Melanie Klaffner (Netherlands) Indy de Vroome	(Romania) Ana Bogdan (Austria) Nicole Rottmann (Spain) Inés Ferrer Suárez (France) Clothilde de Bernardi
August 26, 2013	Mamaia, Romania; Clay $25,000; Singles and doubles draws	(Kazakhstan) Kamila Kerimbayeva (Germany) Christina Shakovets; 6–3, 7–5	(Romania) Diana Buzean (Spain) Inés Ferrer Suárez	(Austria) Melanie Klaffner (Netherlands) Indy de Vroome	(Romania) Ana Bogdan (Austria) Nicole Rottmann (Spain) Inés Ferrer Suárez (France) Clothilde de Bernardi
August 26, 2013	Sharm el-Sheikh, Egypt; Hard $10,000; Singles and doubles draws	(Oman) Fatma Al-Nabhani; 7–5, 6–3	(Russia) Yana Sizikova	(Russia) Anna Morgina (Russia) Alina Mikheeva	(New Zealand) Dianne Hollands (Russia) Julia Valetova (Ukraine) Anastasia Kharchenko (China) Gai Ao
August 26, 2013	Sharm el-Sheikh, Egypt; Hard $10,000; Singles and doubles draws	(Russia) Anna Morgina (Russia) Yana Sizikova; 6–2, 6–4	(Czech Republic) Nikola Horáková (Russia) Julia Valetova	(Russia) Anna Morgina (Russia) Alina Mikheeva	(New Zealand) Dianne Hollands (Russia) Julia Valetova (Ukraine) Anastasia Kharchenko (China) Gai Ao
August 26, 2013	New Delhi, India; Hard $10,000; Singles and doubles draws	(India) Bhuvana Kalva; 6–4, 7–5	(Japan) Akari Inoue	(India) Ankita Raina (Sweden) Matilda Hamlin	(China) Wang Xiyao (India) Natasha Palha (India) Mahitha Dadi Reddy (India) Rishika Sunkara
August 26, 2013	New Delhi, India; Hard $10,000; Singles and doubles draws	(Japan) Akari Inoue (Chinese Taipei) Lee Hua-chen; 6–0, 7–6^{(7–3)}	(Sweden) Matilda Hamlin (India) Shweta Rana	(India) Ankita Raina (Sweden) Matilda Hamlin	(China) Wang Xiyao (India) Natasha Palha (India) Mahitha Dadi Reddy (India) Rishika Sunkara
August 26, 2013	Bagnatica, Italy; Clay $10,000; Singles and doubles draws	(Italy) Gioia Barbieri; 6–3, 3–6, 6–1	(Germany) Anne Schäfer	(Italy) Alberta Brianti (Italy) Anastasia Grymalska	(Italy) Maria Elena Camerin (Italy) Anna Remondina (Georgia (country)) Margalita Chakhnashvili (Slovakia) Zuzana Luknárová
August 26, 2013	Bagnatica, Italy; Clay $10,000; Singles and doubles draws	(Italy) Claudia Giovine (Italy) Anastasia Grymalska; 6–3, 6–3	(Italy) Silvia Mocciola (Italy) Natasha Piludu	(Italy) Alberta Brianti (Italy) Anastasia Grymalska	(Italy) Maria Elena Camerin (Italy) Anna Remondina (Georgia (country)) Margalita Chakhnashvili (Slovakia) Zuzana Luknárová
August 26, 2013	Rotterdam, Netherlands; Clay $10,000; Singles and doubles draws	(United States) Bernarda Pera; 1–6, 6–3, 7–5	(France) Amandine Hesse	(Belarus) Sviatlana Pirazhenka (Spain) Olga Sáez Larra	(Netherlands) Gabriela van de Graaf (Netherlands) Jainy Scheepens (Germany) Nina Zander (Netherlands) Kelly Versteeg
August 26, 2013	Rotterdam, Netherlands; Clay $10,000; Singles and doubles draws	(France) Amandine Hesse (Netherlands) Demi Schuurs; 3–6, 7–5, [10–4]	(Belgium) Elke Lemmens (Belarus) Sviatlana Pirazhenka	(Belarus) Sviatlana Pirazhenka (Spain) Olga Sáez Larra	(Netherlands) Gabriela van de Graaf (Netherlands) Jainy Scheepens (Germany) Nina Zander (Netherlands) Kelly Versteeg
August 26, 2013	Belgrade, Serbia; Clay $10,000; Singles and doubles draws	(Serbia) Tamara Čurović; 6–4, 6–3	(Czech Republic) Tereza Malíková	(Serbia) Dejana Radanović (Serbia) Dunja Stamenković	(Serbia) Marina Lazić (Slovenia) Polona Reberšak (Hungary) Vanda Lukács (Croatia) Ema Mikulčić
August 26, 2013	Belgrade, Serbia; Clay $10,000; Singles and doubles draws	(Croatia) Ema Mikulčić (Germany) Dejana Raickovic; 3–6, 6–3, [10–5]	(Serbia) Marina Lazić (Serbia) Ema Polić	(Serbia) Dejana Radanović (Serbia) Dunja Stamenković	(Serbia) Marina Lazić (Slovenia) Polona Reberšak (Hungary) Vanda Lukács (Croatia) Ema Mikulčić
August 26, 2013	Yeongwol, South Korea; Hard $10,000; Singles and doubles draws	(China) Wang Yafan; 6–1, 6–4	(South Korea) Kim Sun-jung	(South Korea) Kang Seo-kyung (South Korea) Jang Su-jeong	(South Korea) Yu Min-hwa (Chinese Taipei) Lee Pei-chi (South Korea) Choi Ji-hee (Japan) Michika Ozeki
August 26, 2013	Yeongwol, South Korea; Hard $10,000; Singles and doubles draws	(South Korea) Kim Sun-jung (South Korea) Yu Min-hwa; 6–1, 7–5	(South Korea) Kang Seo-kyung (South Korea) Kim Ji-young	(South Korea) Kang Seo-kyung (South Korea) Jang Su-jeong	(South Korea) Yu Min-hwa (Chinese Taipei) Lee Pei-chi (South Korea) Choi Ji-hee (Japan) Michika Ozeki
August 26, 2013	Caslano, Switzerland; Clay $10,000; Singles and doubles draws	(Czech Republic) Barbora Štefková; 6–3, 6–1	(Switzerland) Chiara Grimm	(Germany) Syna Kayser (Germany) Tayisiya Morderger	(Poland) Natalia Siedliska (Switzerland) Samira Giger (Switzerland) Jil Belen Teichmann (Italy) Giulia Sussarello
August 26, 2013	Caslano, Switzerland; Clay $10,000; Singles and doubles draws	(Switzerland) Chiara Grimm (Switzerland) Jil Belen Teichmann; 6–4, 4–6, [10–4]	(Switzerland) Sara Ottomano (Czech Republic) Barbora Štefková	(Germany) Syna Kayser (Germany) Tayisiya Morderger	(Poland) Natalia Siedliska (Switzerland) Samira Giger (Switzerland) Jil Belen Teichmann (Italy) Giulia Sussarello
August 26, 2013	Antalya, Turkey; Hard $10,000; Singles and doubles draws	(Ukraine) Vladyslava Zanosiyenko; 7–5, 6–2	(Brazil) Carla Forte	(Slovakia) Zuzana Zlochová (Spain) Nuria Párrizas Díaz	(Australia) Nives Baric (Armenia) Ani Amiraghyan (United Kingdom) Melanie South (Bulgaria) Julia Stamatova
August 26, 2013	Antalya, Turkey; Hard $10,000; Singles and doubles draws	(Argentina) Andrea Benítez (Brazil) Carla Forte; 4–6, 6–3, [10–8]	(Finland) Emma Laine (United Kingdom) Melanie South	(Slovakia) Zuzana Zlochová (Spain) Nuria Párrizas Díaz	(Australia) Nives Baric (Armenia) Ani Amiraghyan (United Kingdom) Melanie South (Bulgaria) Julia Stamatova

=== September ===
Week of	Tournament	Winner	Runners-up	Semifinalists	Quarterfinalists
September 2, 2013	Save Cup; Mestre, Italy; Clay $50,000; Singles – Doubles	(France) Claire Feuerstein; 6–1, 7–6^{(7–2)}	(Slovenia) Nastja Kolar	(Spain) Beatriz García Vidagany (Liechtenstein) Stephanie Vogt	(Germany) Anne Schäfer (Poland) Paula Kania (Latvia) Diāna Marcinkēviča (Greece) Despina Papamichail
September 2, 2013	Save Cup; Mestre, Italy; Clay $50,000; Singles – Doubles	(France) Laura Thorpe (Liechtenstein) Stephanie Vogt; 7–6^{(7–5)}, 7–5	(Czech Republic) Petra Krejsová (Czech Republic) Tereza Smitková	(Spain) Beatriz García Vidagany (Liechtenstein) Stephanie Vogt	(Germany) Anne Schäfer (Poland) Paula Kania (Latvia) Diāna Marcinkēviča (Greece) Despina Papamichail
September 2, 2013	Trabzon Cup (1); Trabzon, Turkey; Hard $50,000; Singles – Doubles	(Serbia) Aleksandra Krunić; 1–6, 6–4, 6–3	(France) Stéphanie Foretz Gacon	(Belgium) An-Sophie Mestach (United Kingdom) Samantha Murray	(Germany) Dinah Pfizenmaier (Czech Republic) Kristýna Plíšková (Romania) Andreea Mitu (Ukraine) Maryna Zanevska
September 2, 2013	Trabzon Cup (1); Trabzon, Turkey; Hard $50,000; Singles – Doubles	(Ukraine) Yuliya Beygelzimer (Ukraine) Maryna Zanevska; 6–3, 6–1	(Ukraine) Alona Fomina (Germany) Christina Shakovets	(Belgium) An-Sophie Mestach (United Kingdom) Samantha Murray	(Germany) Dinah Pfizenmaier (Czech Republic) Kristýna Plíšková (Romania) Andreea Mitu (Ukraine) Maryna Zanevska
September 2, 2013	Noto, Japan; Grass $25,000; Singles and doubles draws	(Serbia) Doroteja Erić; 6–0, 6–3	(Japan) Eri Hozumi	(South Korea) Yoo Mi (Japan) Mari Tanaka	(Japan) Kanae Hisami (Japan) Miharu Imanishi (Japan) Erika Takao (Japan) Chisa Hosonuma
September 2, 2013	Noto, Japan; Grass $25,000; Singles and doubles draws	(Japan) Eri Hozumi (Japan) Makoto Ninomiya; 6–4, 6–4	(Japan) Kazusa Ito (Japan) Yuka Mori	(South Korea) Yoo Mi (Japan) Mari Tanaka	(Japan) Kanae Hisami (Japan) Miharu Imanishi (Japan) Erika Takao (Japan) Chisa Hosonuma
September 2, 2013	TEAN International; Alphen aan den Rijn, Netherlands; Clay $25,000; Singles – Doubles	(Netherlands) Arantxa Rus; 4–6, 6–2, 6–2	(Germany) Carina Witthöft	(Netherlands) Richèl Hogenkamp (Netherlands) Lesley Kerkhove	(United States) Julia Cohen (Switzerland) Viktorija Golubic (France) Irena Pavlovic (Bulgaria) Elitsa Kostova
September 2, 2013	TEAN International; Alphen aan den Rijn, Netherlands; Clay $25,000; Singles – Doubles	(Netherlands) Cindy Burger (Chile) Daniela Seguel; 6–4, 6–1	(Netherlands) Demi Schuurs (Netherlands) Eva Wacanno	(Netherlands) Richèl Hogenkamp (Netherlands) Lesley Kerkhove	(United States) Julia Cohen (Switzerland) Viktorija Golubic (France) Irena Pavlovic (Bulgaria) Elitsa Kostova
September 2, 2013	Moscow, Russia; Clay $25,000; Singles and doubles draws	(Ukraine) Anastasiya Vasylyeva; 6–2, 6–1	(Russia) Evgeniya Rodina	(Russia) Margarita Gasparyan (Georgia (country)) Sofia Shapatava	(Ukraine) Olga Ianchuk (Russia) Daria Mironova (Czech Republic) Kateřina Vaňková (Russia) Alena Tarasova
September 2, 2013	Moscow, Russia; Clay $25,000; Singles and doubles draws	(Ukraine) Anna Shkudun (Ukraine) Alyona Sotnikova; 6–3, 6–4	(Ukraine) Olga Ianchuk (Estonia) Anett Kontaveit	(Russia) Margarita Gasparyan (Georgia (country)) Sofia Shapatava	(Ukraine) Olga Ianchuk (Russia) Daria Mironova (Czech Republic) Kateřina Vaňková (Russia) Alena Tarasova
September 2, 2013	Sarajevo, Bosnia and Herzegovina; Clay $15,000; Singles and doubles draws	(Germany) Lena-Marie Hofmann; 6–4, 6–2	(Austria) Lisa-Maria Moser	(Czech Republic) Martina Kubičíková (Slovakia) Vivien Juhászová	(Serbia) Milana Špremo (Croatia) Antonela Šušak (Italy) Francesca Palmigiano (Czech Republic) Tereza Malíková
September 2, 2013	Sarajevo, Bosnia and Herzegovina; Clay $15,000; Singles and doubles draws	(Slovakia) Vivien Juhászová (Czech Republic) Tereza Malíková; 6–4, 6–1	(Bosnia and Herzegovina) Anita Husarić (Austria) Lisa-Maria Moser	(Czech Republic) Martina Kubičíková (Slovakia) Vivien Juhászová	(Serbia) Milana Špremo (Croatia) Antonela Šušak (Italy) Francesca Palmigiano (Czech Republic) Tereza Malíková
September 2, 2013	Berlin, Germany; Clay $15,000; Singles and doubles draws	(Czech Republic) Diana Šumová; 6–3, 7–5	(Belgium) Ysaline Bonaventure	(Germany) Sina Haas (Hungary) Vanda Lukács	(Czech Republic) Jesika Malečková (Liechtenstein) Kathinka von Deichmann (Spain) Aliona Bolsova Zadoinov (Slovakia) Chantal Škamlová
September 2, 2013	Berlin, Germany; Clay $15,000; Singles and doubles draws	(Belgium) Ysaline Bonaventure (Sweden) Cornelia Lister; 6–4, 3–6, [10–5]	(Czech Republic) Lenka Kunčíková (Czech Republic) Karolína Stuchlá	(Germany) Sina Haas (Hungary) Vanda Lukács	(Czech Republic) Jesika Malečková (Liechtenstein) Kathinka von Deichmann (Spain) Aliona Bolsova Zadoinov (Slovakia) Chantal Škamlová
September 2, 2013	Huy, Belgium; Clay $10,000; Singles and doubles draws	(Belgium) Deborah Kerfs; 6–4, 6–4	(Germany) Nina Zander	(Netherlands) Jade Schoelink (France) Josepha Adam	(Belgium) Greetje Minnen (Germany) Stefanie Stemmer (Portugal) Maria Palhoto (Belgium) Hélène Scholsen
September 2, 2013	Huy, Belgium; Clay $10,000; Singles and doubles draws	(Germany) Franziska König (Australia) Karolina Wlodarczak; 6–2, 6–4	(Germany) Julia Wachaczyk (Germany) Nina Zander	(Netherlands) Jade Schoelink (France) Josepha Adam	(Belgium) Greetje Minnen (Germany) Stefanie Stemmer (Portugal) Maria Palhoto (Belgium) Hélène Scholsen
September 2, 2013	Sharm el-Sheikh, Egypt; Hard $10,000; Singles and doubles draws	(Oman) Fatma Al-Nabhani; 6–4, 6–1	(Russia) Anna Morgina	(Russia) Yana Sizikova (China) Gai Ao	(United Kingdom) Anna Fitzpatrick (Egypt) Ola Abou Zekry (Russia) Ekaterina Tretyak (Russia) Alina Mikheeva
September 2, 2013	Sharm el-Sheikh, Egypt; Hard $10,000; Singles and doubles draws	(Russia) Anna Morgina (Russia) Yana Sizikova; 6–7^{(4–7)}, 6–1, [10–8]	(Oman) Fatma Al-Nabhani (Russia) Alina Mikheeva	(Russia) Yana Sizikova (China) Gai Ao	(United Kingdom) Anna Fitzpatrick (Egypt) Ola Abou Zekry (Russia) Ekaterina Tretyak (Russia) Alina Mikheeva
September 2, 2013	Belgrade, Serbia; Clay $10,000; Singles and doubles draws	(Switzerland) Xenia Knoll; 6–3, 6–3	(Serbia) Natalija Kostić	(Kazakhstan) Kamila Kerimbayeva (Serbia) Tamara Čurović	(Greece) Valentini Grammatikopoulou (Serbia) Elizabeta Bauer (Romania) Camelia Hristea (North Macedonia) Lina Gjorcheska
September 2, 2013	Belgrade, Serbia; Clay $10,000; Singles and doubles draws	(North Macedonia) Lina Gjorcheska (Romania) Camelia Hristea; 6–0, 6–1	(Serbia) Tamara Čurović (Switzerland) Xenia Knoll	(Kazakhstan) Kamila Kerimbayeva (Serbia) Tamara Čurović	(Greece) Valentini Grammatikopoulou (Serbia) Elizabeta Bauer (Romania) Camelia Hristea (North Macedonia) Lina Gjorcheska
September 2, 2013	Yeongwol, South Korea; Hard $10,000; Singles and doubles draws	(China) Wang Yafan; 2–6, 6–1, 6–2	(Chinese Taipei) Lee Pei-chi	(Thailand) Peangtarn Plipuech (South Korea) Kim Sun-jung	(China) Zhu Lin (Indonesia) Lavinia Tananta (Indonesia) Ayu Fani Damayanti (China) Lu Jiajing
September 2, 2013	Yeongwol, South Korea; Hard $10,000; Singles and doubles draws	(South Korea) Hong Seung-yeon (South Korea) Lee Hye-min; 5–7, 6–2, [10–5]	(Indonesia) Ayu Fani Damayanti (Indonesia) Lavinia Tananta	(Thailand) Peangtarn Plipuech (South Korea) Kim Sun-jung	(China) Zhu Lin (Indonesia) Lavinia Tananta (Indonesia) Ayu Fani Damayanti (China) Lu Jiajing
September 2, 2013	Antalya, Turkey; Hard $10,000; Singles and doubles draws	(Romania) Ana Bogdan; 6–0, 6–2	(Sweden) Malin Ulvefeldt	(United Kingdom) Melanie South (Sweden) Louise Brunskog	(Ukraine) Diana Bogoliy (Russia) Anastasia Mukhametova (Japan) Nozomi Fujioka (Bulgaria) Julia Stamatova
September 2, 2013	Antalya, Turkey; Hard $10,000; Singles and doubles draws	(Finland) Emma Laine (United Kingdom) Melanie South; 6–4, 6–3	(Thailand) Patcharin Cheapchandej (Thailand) Tanaporn Thongsing	(United Kingdom) Melanie South (Sweden) Louise Brunskog	(Ukraine) Diana Bogoliy (Russia) Anastasia Mukhametova (Japan) Nozomi Fujioka (Bulgaria) Julia Stamatova
September 9, 2013	ITF Women's Circuit – Sanya; Sanya, China; Hard $50,000; Singles – Doubles	(Czech Republic) Karolína Plíšková; 6–3, 6–4	(China) Zheng Saisai	(China) Duan Yingying (China) Zhang Shuai	(Japan) Misa Eguchi (Thailand) Varatchaya Wongteanchai (Kazakhstan) Zarina Diyas (China) Wang Yafan
September 9, 2013	ITF Women's Circuit – Sanya; Sanya, China; Hard $50,000; Singles – Doubles	(China) Sun Ziyue (China) Xu Shilin; 6–7^{(5–7)}, 6–3, [10–3]	(China) Yang Zhaoxuan (China) Zhao Yijing	(China) Duan Yingying (China) Zhang Shuai	(Japan) Misa Eguchi (Thailand) Varatchaya Wongteanchai (Kazakhstan) Zarina Diyas (China) Wang Yafan
September 9, 2013	Trabzon Cup (2); Trabzon, Turkey; Hard $50,000; Singles – Doubles	(Germany) Anna-Lena Friedsam; 4–6, 6–3, 6–3	(Ukraine) Yuliya Beygelzimer	(Slovenia) Dalila Jakupović (Serbia) Aleksandra Krunić	(Georgia (country)) Oksana Kalashnikova (Belgium) An-Sophie Mestach (Russia) Ekaterina Bychkova (Romania) Andreea Mitu
September 9, 2013	Trabzon Cup (2); Trabzon, Turkey; Hard $50,000; Singles – Doubles	(Georgia (country)) Oksana Kalashnikova (Serbia) Aleksandra Krunić; 6–2, 6–1	(Armenia) Ani Amiraghyan (Slovenia) Dalila Jakupović	(Slovenia) Dalila Jakupović (Serbia) Aleksandra Krunić	(Georgia (country)) Oksana Kalashnikova (Belgium) An-Sophie Mestach (Russia) Ekaterina Bychkova (Romania) Andreea Mitu
September 9, 2013	Allianz Cup; Sofia, Bulgaria; Clay $25,000; Singles and doubles draws	(Austria) Patricia Mayr-Achleitner; 6–2, 1–6, 6–3	(Slovakia) Kristína Kučová	(Germany) Anne Schäfer (Italy) Gioia Barbieri	(Russia) Marina Melnikova (Canada) Heidi El Tabakh (Spain) Beatriz García Vidagany (Romania) Cristina Dinu
September 9, 2013	Allianz Cup; Sofia, Bulgaria; Clay $25,000; Singles and doubles draws	(Bulgaria) Dia Evtimova (Bulgaria) Viktoriya Tomova; 6–4, 2–6, [10–6]	(Spain) Beatriz García Vidagany (Hungary) Réka-Luca Jani	(Germany) Anne Schäfer (Italy) Gioia Barbieri	(Russia) Marina Melnikova (Canada) Heidi El Tabakh (Spain) Beatriz García Vidagany (Romania) Cristina Dinu
September 9, 2013	Mont-de-Marsan, France; Clay $25,000; Singles and doubles draws	(Brazil) Teliana Pereira; 6–1, 6–4	(France) Pauline Parmentier	(France) Kinnie Laisné (France) Alizé Lim	(France) Laura Thorpe (Argentina) María Irigoyen (Italy) Alberta Brianti (France) Amandine Hesse
September 9, 2013	Mont-de-Marsan, France; Clay $25,000; Singles and doubles draws	(Chile) Cecilia Costa Melgar (Chile) Daniela Seguel; 6–4, 6–2	(France) Alizé Lim (France) Laura Thorpe	(France) Kinnie Laisné (France) Alizé Lim	(France) Laura Thorpe (Argentina) María Irigoyen (Italy) Alberta Brianti (France) Amandine Hesse
September 9, 2013	Royal Cup NLB Montenegro; Podgorica, Montenegro; Clay $25,000; Singles and doubles draws	(Liechtenstein) Stephanie Vogt; 6–4, 6–3	(Estonia) Anett Kontaveit	(Italy) Giulia Gatto-Monticone (Bosnia and Herzegovina) Jasmina Tinjić	(Hungary) Ágnes Bukta (United States) Julia Cohen (Austria) Yvonne Neuwirth (Slovakia) Karin Morgošová
September 9, 2013	Royal Cup NLB Montenegro; Podgorica, Montenegro; Clay $25,000; Singles and doubles draws	(Montenegro) Vladica Babić (Croatia) Iva Mekovec; 6–4, 6–7^{(1–7)}, [10–5]	(Czech Republic) Kateřina Vaňková (Slovenia) Maša Zec Peškirič	(Italy) Giulia Gatto-Monticone (Bosnia and Herzegovina) Jasmina Tinjić	(Hungary) Ágnes Bukta (United States) Julia Cohen (Austria) Yvonne Neuwirth (Slovakia) Karin Morgošová
September 9, 2013	Incheon, South Korea; Hard $25,000; Singles and doubles draws	(Japan) Erika Sema; 6–3, 6–4	(Japan) Yurika Sema	(South Korea) Han Na-lae (South Korea) Kim So-jung	(Japan) Miharu Imanishi (South Korea) Yoo Mi (South Korea) Choi Ji-hee (South Korea) Lee Ye-ra
September 9, 2013	Incheon, South Korea; Hard $25,000; Singles and doubles draws	(Japan) Miki Miyamura (Japan) Akiko Omae; 6–4, 6–7^{(6–8)}, [11–9]	(Thailand) Nicha Lertpitaksinchai (Thailand) Peangtarn Plipuech	(South Korea) Han Na-lae (South Korea) Kim So-jung	(Japan) Miharu Imanishi (South Korea) Yoo Mi (South Korea) Choi Ji-hee (South Korea) Lee Ye-ra
September 9, 2013	Redding, United States; Hard $25,000; Singles and doubles draws	(Venezuela) Adriana Pérez; 2–6, 6–2, 6–1	(United States) Robin Anderson	(United States) Allie Kiick (United States) Julia Boserup	(Australia) Olivia Rogowska (South Africa) Chanel Simmonds (United States) Christina Makarova (Russia) Ksenia Pervak
September 9, 2013	Redding, United States; Hard $25,000; Singles and doubles draws	(United States) Robin Anderson (United States) Lauren Embree; 6–4, 5–7, [10–7]	(United States) Jacqueline Cako (United States) Allie Kiick	(United States) Allie Kiick (United States) Julia Boserup	(Australia) Olivia Rogowska (South Africa) Chanel Simmonds (United States) Christina Makarova (Russia) Ksenia Pervak
September 9, 2013	Toowoomba, Australia; Hard $15,000; Singles and doubles draws	(Australia) Isabella Holland; 2–6, 7–6^{(8–6)}, 6–3	(Slovakia) Zuzana Zlochová	(Australia) Olivia Tjandramulia (Australia) Azra Hadzic	(Australia) Pamela Boyanov (Japan) Yurina Koshino (Australia) Sally Peers (Australia) Ellen Perez
September 9, 2013	Toowoomba, Australia; Hard $15,000; Singles and doubles draws	(Japan) Tomoko Dokei (Japan) Yurina Koshino; 6–2, 5–7, [10–7]	(Australia) Karis Ryan (Slovakia) Zuzana Zlochová	(Australia) Olivia Tjandramulia (Australia) Azra Hadzic	(Australia) Pamela Boyanov (Japan) Yurina Koshino (Australia) Sally Peers (Australia) Ellen Perez
September 9, 2013	Tlemcen, Algeria; Clay $10,000; Singles and doubles draws	(Algeria) Ines Ibbou; 6–1, 6–1	(France) Amandine Cazeaux	(Austria) Natasha Bredl (Germany) Alina Wessel	(India) Shweta Rana (United States) Alexandra Riley (France) Fiona Codino (France) Joséphine Boualem
September 9, 2013	Tlemcen, Algeria; Clay $10,000; Singles and doubles draws	(France) Amandine Cazeaux (Germany) Alina Wessel; 6–2, 7–5	(India) Shivika Burman (India) Shweta Rana	(Austria) Natasha Bredl (Germany) Alina Wessel	(India) Shweta Rana (United States) Alexandra Riley (France) Fiona Codino (France) Joséphine Boualem
September 9, 2013	Buenos Aires, Argentina; Clay $10,000; Singles and doubles draws	(Argentina) Vanesa Furlanetto; 6–4, 6–4	(Argentina) Carolina Zeballos	(Peru) Bianca Botto (Chile) Fernanda Brito	(Argentina) Carla Bruzzesi Avella (Argentina) Carolina Costamagna (Argentina) Edith Ayelen Monzon (Argentina) Sofía Blanco
September 9, 2013	Buenos Aires, Argentina; Clay $10,000; Singles and doubles draws	(Brazil) Flávia Guimarães Bueno (Argentina) Stephanie Petit; 6–2, 6–4	(Argentina) Vanesa Furlanetto (Argentina) Carolina Zeballos	(Peru) Bianca Botto (Chile) Fernanda Brito	(Argentina) Carla Bruzzesi Avella (Argentina) Carolina Costamagna (Argentina) Edith Ayelen Monzon (Argentina) Sofía Blanco
September 9, 2013	Curitiba, Brazil; Clay $10,000; Singles and doubles draws	(Brazil) Ana Clara Duarte; 6–1, 6–4	(Brazil) Nathaly Kurata	(Brazil) Leticia Vidal (Brazil) Nathália Rossi	(Brazil) Eduarda Piai (Brazil) Isabella Capato Camargo (Brazil) Suellen Abel (Chile) Ivania Martinich
September 9, 2013	Curitiba, Brazil; Clay $10,000; Singles and doubles draws	(Brazil) Carolina Alves (Brazil) Leticia Vidal; 4–6, 6–4, [10–8]	(Brazil) Maria Vitória Beirão (Brazil) Ana Clara Duarte	(Brazil) Leticia Vidal (Brazil) Nathália Rossi	(Brazil) Eduarda Piai (Brazil) Isabella Capato Camargo (Brazil) Suellen Abel (Chile) Ivania Martinich
September 9, 2013	Sharm el-Sheikh, Egypt; Hard $10,000; Singles and doubles draws	(Russia) Yana Sizikova; 7–6^{(9–7)}, 3–6, 7–5	(India) Prarthana Thombare	(China) Gai Ao (Russia) Alina Mikheeva	(Italy) Giulia Bruzzone (Russia) Evgeniya Svintsova (United Kingdom) Anna Fitzpatrick (United Kingdom) Francesca Stephenson
September 9, 2013	Sharm el-Sheikh, Egypt; Hard $10,000; Singles and doubles draws	(Italy) Giulia Bruzzone (Russia) Alina Mikheeva; 4–6, 6–4, [10–4]	(Egypt) Ola Abou Zekry (China) Gai Ao	(China) Gai Ao (Russia) Alina Mikheeva	(Italy) Giulia Bruzzone (Russia) Evgeniya Svintsova (United Kingdom) Anna Fitzpatrick (United Kingdom) Francesca Stephenson
September 9, 2013	Mytilene, Greece; Hard $10,000; Singles and doubles draws	(Belgium) Klaartje Liebens; 6–2, 6–1	(Greece) Maria Sakkari	(United States) Ashley Murdock (Sweden) Beatrice Cedermark	(Greece) Angeliki Kairi (Netherlands) Mandy Wagemaker (Greece) Agni Stefanou (Switzerland) Lisa Sabino
September 9, 2013	Mytilene, Greece; Hard $10,000; Singles and doubles draws	(United States) Ashley Murdock (United States) Eva Raszkiewicz; 1–6, 6–2, [10–7]	(United Kingdom) Laura Deigman (Switzerland) Lisa Sabino	(United States) Ashley Murdock (Sweden) Beatrice Cedermark	(Greece) Angeliki Kairi (Netherlands) Mandy Wagemaker (Greece) Agni Stefanou (Switzerland) Lisa Sabino
September 9, 2013	Santa Margherita di Pula, Italy; Clay $10,000; Singles and doubles draws	(Italy) Alice Matteucci; 5–7, 6–2, 7–5	(Italy) Claudia Giovine	(Italy) Jasmine Paolini (Italy) Federica Arcidiacono	(Netherlands) Quirine Lemoine (Austria) Pia König (Belgium) Kimberley Zimmermann (Italy) Georgia Brescia
September 9, 2013	Santa Margherita di Pula, Italy; Clay $10,000; Singles and doubles draws	(Italy) Giorgia Marchetti (Italy) Jasmine Paolini; 7–6^{(7–3)}, 7–6^{(7–3)}	(Australia) Alexandra Nancarrow (Germany) Laura Schaeder	(Italy) Jasmine Paolini (Italy) Federica Arcidiacono	(Netherlands) Quirine Lemoine (Austria) Pia König (Belgium) Kimberley Zimmermann (Italy) Georgia Brescia
September 9, 2013	Kyoto, Japan; Carpet (indoor) $10,000; Singles and doubles draws	(Japan) Hiroko Kuwata; 6–1, 6–2	(Japan) Akiko Yonemura	(Japan) Miyu Kato (Japan) Makiho Kozawa	(Japan) Maya Wakui (Japan) Emi Mutaguchi (Japan) Hayaka Murase (Japan) Kaori Onishi
September 9, 2013	Kyoto, Japan; Carpet (indoor) $10,000; Singles and doubles draws	(Japan) Miyu Kato (Japan) Hiroko Kuwata; 6–4, 6–2	(Japan) Mana Ayukawa (Japan) Emi Mutaguchi	(Japan) Miyu Kato (Japan) Makiho Kozawa	(Japan) Maya Wakui (Japan) Emi Mutaguchi (Japan) Hayaka Murase (Japan) Kaori Onishi
September 9, 2013	Vrnjačka Banja, Serbia; Clay $10,000; Singles and doubles draws	(Slovakia) Rebecca Šramková; 6–3, 6–2	(Serbia) Dunja Stamenković	(Serbia) Marina Lazić (North Macedonia) Lina Gjorcheska	(Serbia) Bojana Marinković (Serbia) Katarina Adamović (Serbia) Nina Stojanović (Serbia) Ema Polić
September 9, 2013	Vrnjačka Banja, Serbia; Clay $10,000; Singles and doubles draws	(North Macedonia) Lina Gjorcheska (Russia) Polina Leykina; 6–4, 6–3	(Slovakia) Rebecca Šramková (Slovakia) Natália Vajdová	(Serbia) Marina Lazić (North Macedonia) Lina Gjorcheska	(Serbia) Bojana Marinković (Serbia) Katarina Adamović (Serbia) Nina Stojanović (Serbia) Ema Polić
September 9, 2013	Lleida, Spain; Clay $10,000; Singles and doubles draws	(Spain) Aliona Bolsova Zadoinov; 0–6, 6–3, 6–2	(Egypt) Mayar Sherif	(Spain) Olga Sáez Larra (Spain) Lucía Cervera Vázquez	(Russia) Alena Tarasova (Spain) Paula Badosa (Spain) Andrea Lázaro García (Spain) Arabela Fernández Rabener
September 9, 2013	Lleida, Spain; Clay $10,000; Singles and doubles draws	(Croatia) Adrijana Lekaj (Russia) Alena Tarasova; 6–3, 6–4	(Argentina) Tatiana Búa (Spain) Lucía Cervera Vázquez	(Spain) Olga Sáez Larra (Spain) Lucía Cervera Vázquez	(Russia) Alena Tarasova (Spain) Paula Badosa (Spain) Andrea Lázaro García (Spain) Arabela Fernández Rabener
September 9, 2013	Antalya, Turkey; Hard $10,000; Singles and doubles draws	(Slovakia) Chantal Škamlová; 7–5, 6–3	(Czech Republic) Kateřina Kramperová	(Ukraine) Marianna Zakarlyuk (Romania) Nicoleta-Cătălina Dascălu	(Ukraine) Olena Kyrpot (Belgium) Michelle Werbrouck (Sweden) Matilda Hamlin (Thailand) Tanaporn Thongsing
September 9, 2013	Antalya, Turkey; Hard $10,000; Singles and doubles draws	(Germany) Michaela Frlicka (Czech Republic) Kateřina Kramperová; 6–3, 7–6^{(7–4)}	(Slovakia) Chantal Škamlová (Austria) Marlies Szupper	(Ukraine) Marianna Zakarlyuk (Romania) Nicoleta-Cătălina Dascălu	(Ukraine) Olena Kyrpot (Belgium) Michelle Werbrouck (Sweden) Matilda Hamlin (Thailand) Tanaporn Thongsing
September 16, 2013	Coleman Vision Tennis Championships; Albuquerque, United States; Hard $75,000; Singles – Doubles	(United States) Shelby Rogers; 6–2, 6–3	(Georgia (country)) Anna Tatishvili	(United States) Alison Riske (United States) Chieh-Yu Hsu	(United States) Coco Vandeweghe (Germany) Kristina Barrois (Slovenia) Petra Rampre (United States) Sachia Vickery
September 16, 2013	Coleman Vision Tennis Championships; Albuquerque, United States; Hard $75,000; Singles – Doubles	(Greece) Eleni Daniilidou (United States) Coco Vandeweghe; 6–4, 7–6^{(7–2)}	(United States) Melanie Oudin (United States) Taylor Townsend	(United States) Alison Riske (United States) Chieh-Yu Hsu	(United States) Coco Vandeweghe (Germany) Kristina Barrois (Slovenia) Petra Rampre (United States) Sachia Vickery
September 16, 2013	Izida Cup; Dobrich, Bulgaria; Clay $25,000; Singles and doubles draws	(Austria) Patricia Mayr-Achleitner; 6–1, 6–2	(Romania) Cristina Dinu	(United States) Julia Cohen (Canada) Heidi El Tabakh	(Czech Republic) Kateřina Vaňková (Bulgaria) Borislava Botusharova (Bulgaria) Dia Evtimova (Bulgaria) Viktoriya Tomova
September 16, 2013	Izida Cup; Dobrich, Bulgaria; Clay $25,000; Singles and doubles draws	(Switzerland) Xenia Knoll (Serbia) Teodora Mirčić; 7–5, 7–6^{(7–5)}	(Bulgaria) Isabella Shinikova (Bulgaria) Dalia Zafirova	(United States) Julia Cohen (Canada) Heidi El Tabakh	(Czech Republic) Kateřina Vaňková (Bulgaria) Borislava Botusharova (Bulgaria) Dia Evtimova (Bulgaria) Viktoriya Tomova
September 16, 2013	Saint-Malo, France; Clay $25,000; Singles and doubles draws	(Brazil) Teliana Pereira; 6–2, 6–1	(France) Pauline Parmentier	(Italy) Gaia Sanesi (Argentina) Florencia Molinero	(Italy) Alberta Brianti (France) Irina Ramialison (France) Amandine Hesse (Liechtenstein) Stephanie Vogt
September 16, 2013	Saint-Malo, France; Clay $25,000; Singles and doubles draws	(Bulgaria) Elitsa Kostova (Argentina) Florencia Molinero; 6–2, 6–4	(Liechtenstein) Kathinka von Deichmann (Germany) Nina Zander	(Italy) Gaia Sanesi (Argentina) Florencia Molinero	(Italy) Alberta Brianti (France) Irina Ramialison (France) Amandine Hesse (Liechtenstein) Stephanie Vogt
September 16, 2013	Batumi, Georgia; Hard $25,000; Singles and doubles draws	(Russia) Alexandra Panova; 6–4, 0–6, 7–5	(Ukraine) Kateryna Kozlova	(Georgia (country)) Sofia Shapatava (Belarus) Aliaksandra Sasnovich	(Slovenia) Dalila Jakupović (Russia) Irina Khromacheva (Ukraine) Valentyna Ivakhnenko (Belarus) Ilona Kremen
September 16, 2013	Batumi, Georgia; Hard $25,000; Singles and doubles draws	(Ukraine) Valentyna Ivakhnenko (Ukraine) Kateryna Kozlova; 6–0, 6–4	(Ukraine) Alona Fomina (Germany) Christina Shakovets	(Georgia (country)) Sofia Shapatava (Belarus) Aliaksandra Sasnovich	(Slovenia) Dalila Jakupović (Russia) Irina Khromacheva (Ukraine) Valentyna Ivakhnenko (Belarus) Ilona Kremen
September 16, 2013	Aegon GB Pro-Series Shrewsbury; Shrewsbury, United Kingdom; Hard (indoor) $25,000; Singles and doubles draws	(Belgium) Alison Van Uytvanck; 7–5, 6–1	(Russia) Marta Sirotkina	(Czech Republic) Martina Borecká (Croatia) Ana Vrljić	(France) Claire Feuerstein (Germany) Lena-Marie Hofmann (Turkey) Pemra Özgen (France) Julie Coin
September 16, 2013	Aegon GB Pro-Series Shrewsbury; Shrewsbury, United Kingdom; Hard (indoor) $25,000; Singles and doubles draws	(Turkey) Çağla Büyükakçay (Turkey) Pemra Özgen; 4–6, 6–4, [10–8]	(United Kingdom) Samantha Murray (United Kingdom) Jade Windley	(Czech Republic) Martina Borecká (Croatia) Ana Vrljić	(France) Claire Feuerstein (Germany) Lena-Marie Hofmann (Turkey) Pemra Özgen (France) Julie Coin
September 16, 2013	Cairns, Australia; Hard $15,000; Singles and doubles draws	(Australia) Azra Hadzic; 6–3, 3–6, 6–2	(Australia) Jessica Moore	(Slovakia) Zuzana Zlochová (New Zealand) Dianne Hollands	(Australia) Kimberly Birrell (Japan) Miyu Kato (Australia) Priscilla Hon (Australia) Sally Peers
September 16, 2013	Cairns, Australia; Hard $15,000; Singles and doubles draws	(Australia) Isabella Holland (Australia) Sally Peers; 7–6^{(7–2)}, 4–6, [10–7]	(Japan) Miyu Kato (Japan) Yurina Koshino	(Slovakia) Zuzana Zlochová (New Zealand) Dianne Hollands	(Australia) Kimberly Birrell (Japan) Miyu Kato (Australia) Priscilla Hon (Australia) Sally Peers
September 16, 2013	Algiers, Algeria; Clay $10,000; Singles and doubles draws	(France) Sherazad Benamar; 6–1, 3–6, 6–1	(India) Shweta Rana	(France) Harmony Tan (Germany) Alina Wessel	(France) Amandine Cazeaux (India) Shivika Burman (Romania) Cristina Moroi (Finland) Mia Nicole Eklund
September 16, 2013	Algiers, Algeria; Clay $10,000; Singles and doubles draws	(France) Sherazad Benamar (France) Amandine Cazeaux; 6–0, 6–3	(India) Shivika Burman (India) Shweta Rana	(France) Harmony Tan (Germany) Alina Wessel	(France) Amandine Cazeaux (India) Shivika Burman (Romania) Cristina Moroi (Finland) Mia Nicole Eklund
September 16, 2013	Rosario, Argentina; Clay $10,000; Singles and doubles draws	(Argentina) Vanesa Furlanetto; 6–2, 6–1	(Chile) Fernanda Brito	(Argentina) Victoria Bosio (Peru) Bianca Botto	(Argentina) Sofía Luini (Argentina) Ana Madcur (Argentina) Constanza Vega (Argentina) Sofía Blanco
September 16, 2013	Rosario, Argentina; Clay $10,000; Singles and doubles draws	(Argentina) Vanesa Furlanetto (Argentina) Carolina Zeballos; 7–6^{(7–2)}, 6–2	(Argentina) Sofía Luini (Argentina) Guadalupe Pérez Rojas	(Argentina) Victoria Bosio (Peru) Bianca Botto	(Argentina) Sofía Luini (Argentina) Ana Madcur (Argentina) Constanza Vega (Argentina) Sofía Blanco
September 16, 2013	Sharm el-Sheikh, Egypt; Hard $10,000; Singles and doubles draws	(Russia) Julia Valetova; 6–7^{(5–7)}, 7–5, 7–6^{(7–4)}	(Italy) Giulia Bruzzone	(India) Prarthana Thombare (Egypt) Ola Abou Zekry	(United States) Samantha Powers (Ukraine) Anastasiya Shestakova (Czech Republic) Nikola Horáková (Estonia) Erika Hendsel
September 16, 2013	Sharm el-Sheikh, Egypt; Hard $10,000; Singles and doubles draws	(India) Prarthana Thombare (Russia) Julia Valetova; 6–1, 6–4	(Russia) Viktoriya Bogoslovskaya (Russia) Evgeniya Svintsova	(India) Prarthana Thombare (Egypt) Ola Abou Zekry	(United States) Samantha Powers (Ukraine) Anastasiya Shestakova (Czech Republic) Nikola Horáková (Estonia) Erika Hendsel
September 16, 2013	Santa Margherita di Pula, Italy; Clay $10,000; Singles and doubles draws	(France) Jade Suvrijn; 6–3, 3–6, 6–3	(Germany) Laura Schaeder	(Switzerland) Tess Sugnaux (Italy) Georgia Brescia	(Colombia) Yuliana Lizarazo (Italy) Sara Eccel (Austria) Pia König (Italy) Claudia Giovine
September 16, 2013	Santa Margherita di Pula, Italy; Clay $10,000; Singles and doubles draws	(Netherlands) Gabriela van de Graaf (Netherlands) Quirine Lemoine; 6–4, 6–7^{(10–12)}, [10–3]	(Poland) Agata Barańska (Austria) Pia König	(Switzerland) Tess Sugnaux (Italy) Georgia Brescia	(Colombia) Yuliana Lizarazo (Italy) Sara Eccel (Austria) Pia König (Italy) Claudia Giovine
September 16, 2013	Budva, Montenegro; Clay $10,000; Singles and doubles draws	(Croatia) Iva Mekovec; 6–0, 1–6, 6–3	(Bosnia and Herzegovina) Katarina Jokić	(Montenegro) Vladica Babić (Russia) Julia Samuseva	(Romania) Ana Bianca Mihăilă (Slovakia) Karin Morgošová (Serbia) Milana Špremo (Croatia) Ema Mikulčić
September 16, 2013	Budva, Montenegro; Clay $10,000; Singles and doubles draws	(Croatia) Ema Mikulčić (Germany) Dejana Raickovic; 6–2, 6–2	(Bosnia and Herzegovina) Dea Herdželaš (Romania) Ana Bianca Mihăilă	(Montenegro) Vladica Babić (Russia) Julia Samuseva	(Romania) Ana Bianca Mihăilă (Slovakia) Karin Morgošová (Serbia) Milana Špremo (Croatia) Ema Mikulčić
September 16, 2013	Antalya, Turkey; Hard $10,000; Singles and doubles draws	(Kyrgyzstan) Ksenia Palkina; 6–3, 6–1	(France) Caroline Roméo	(Philippines) Katharina Lehnert (Japan) Hirono Watanabe	(Austria) Marlies Szupper (Thailand) Tanaporn Thongsing (Sweden) Louise Brunskog (Italy) Carolina Pillot
September 16, 2013	Antalya, Turkey; Hard $10,000; Singles and doubles draws	(Israel) Deniz Khazaniuk (Kyrgyzstan) Ksenia Palkina; 6–7^{(5–7)}, 7–6^{(7–3)}, [10–8]	(Philippines) Katharina Lehnert (Slovakia) Chantal Škamlová	(Philippines) Katharina Lehnert (Japan) Hirono Watanabe	(Austria) Marlies Szupper (Thailand) Tanaporn Thongsing (Sweden) Louise Brunskog (Italy) Carolina Pillot
September 23, 2013	Telavi Open; Telavi, Georgia; Clay $50,000; Singles – Doubles	(Russia) Alexandra Panova; 7–5, 6–1	(Russia) Victoria Kan	(Romania) Andreea Mitu (Ukraine) Ganna Poznikhirenko	(Slovenia) Nastja Kolar (Belarus) Ilona Kremen (Japan) Misa Eguchi (Russia) Irina Khromacheva
September 23, 2013	Telavi Open; Telavi, Georgia; Clay $50,000; Singles – Doubles	(Italy) Maria Elena Camerin (Slovenia) Anja Prislan; 7–5, 6–2	(Germany) Anna Zaja (Slovenia) Maša Zec Peškirič	(Romania) Andreea Mitu (Ukraine) Ganna Poznikhirenko	(Slovenia) Nastja Kolar (Belarus) Ilona Kremen (Japan) Misa Eguchi (Russia) Irina Khromacheva
September 23, 2013	Party Rock Open; Las Vegas, United States; Hard $50,000; Singles – Doubles	(United States) Melanie Oudin; 5–7, 6–3, 6–3	(United States) Coco Vandeweghe	(Japan) Mayo Hibi (Georgia (country)) Anna Tatishvili	(Croatia) Ajla Tomljanović (South Africa) Chanel Simmonds (United States) Allie Kiick (United States) Madison Brengle
September 23, 2013	Party Rock Open; Las Vegas, United States; Hard $50,000; Singles – Doubles	(Austria) Tamira Paszek (United States) Coco Vandeweghe; 6–4, 6–2	(United States) Denise Muresan (United States) Caitlin Whoriskey	(Japan) Mayo Hibi (Georgia (country)) Anna Tatishvili	(Croatia) Ajla Tomljanović (South Africa) Chanel Simmonds (United States) Allie Kiick (United States) Madison Brengle
September 23, 2013	Clermont-Ferrand, France; Hard (indoor) $25,000; Singles and doubles draws	(France) Julie Coin; 3–6, 6–1, 6–4	(Serbia) Doroteja Erić	(Ukraine) Maryna Zanevska (France) Claire Feuerstein	(Germany) Nina Zander (Czech Republic) Lucie Hradecká (Italy) Giulia Gatto-Monticone (Netherlands) Michaëlla Krajicek
September 23, 2013	Clermont-Ferrand, France; Hard (indoor) $25,000; Singles and doubles draws	(Poland) Marta Domachowska (Netherlands) Michaëlla Krajicek; 5–7, 6–4, [10–8]	(Russia) Margarita Gasparyan (Ukraine) Alyona Sotnikova	(Ukraine) Maryna Zanevska (France) Claire Feuerstein	(Germany) Nina Zander (Czech Republic) Lucie Hradecká (Italy) Giulia Gatto-Monticone (Netherlands) Michaëlla Krajicek
September 23, 2013	Seville, Spain; Clay $25,000; Singles and doubles draws	(Brazil) Teliana Pereira; 7–6^{(7–5)}, 6–3	(Argentina) Florencia Molinero	(France) Alizé Lim (Netherlands) Arantxa Rus	(Switzerland) Timea Bacsinszky (Spain) Beatriz García Vidagany (United States) Bernarda Pera (Italy) Anastasia Grymalska
September 23, 2013	Seville, Spain; Clay $25,000; Singles and doubles draws	(Brazil) Paula Cristina Gonçalves (Argentina) Florencia Molinero; 6–3, 7–5	(Chile) Cecilia Costa Melgar (Italy) Gaia Sanesi	(France) Alizé Lim (Netherlands) Arantxa Rus	(Switzerland) Timea Bacsinszky (Spain) Beatriz García Vidagany (United States) Bernarda Pera (Italy) Anastasia Grymalska
September 23, 2013	Aegon Pro-Series Loughborough; Loughborough, United Kingdom; Hard (indoor) $25,000; Singles and doubles draws	(Germany) Anna-Lena Friedsam; 6–3, 6–0	(Belgium) Alison Van Uytvanck	(Switzerland) Viktorija Golubic (Czech Republic) Tereza Martincová	(Latvia) Diāna Marcinkēviča (Czech Republic) Kateřina Kramperová (Czech Republic) Kateřina Vaňková (Czech Republic) Renata Voráčová
September 23, 2013	Aegon Pro-Series Loughborough; Loughborough, United Kingdom; Hard (indoor) $25,000; Singles and doubles draws	(Turkey) Çağla Büyükakçay (Turkey) Pemra Özgen; 6–2, 5–7, [10–6]	(Poland) Magda Linette (Czech Republic) Tereza Smitková	(Switzerland) Viktorija Golubic (Czech Republic) Tereza Martincová	(Latvia) Diāna Marcinkēviča (Czech Republic) Kateřina Kramperová (Czech Republic) Kateřina Vaňková (Czech Republic) Renata Voráčová
September 23, 2013	Fergana Challenger; Fergana, Uzbekistan; Hard $25,000; Singles – Doubles	(Uzbekistan) Nigina Abduraimova; 2–6, 6–1, 7–6^{(7–4)}	(Ukraine) Anastasiya Vasylyeva	(Ukraine) Lyudmyla Kichenok (Ukraine) Veronika Kapshay	(Turkey) Başak Eraydın (India) Ankita Raina (Japan) Erika Takao (Japan) Mari Tanaka
September 23, 2013	Fergana Challenger; Fergana, Uzbekistan; Hard $25,000; Singles – Doubles	(Ukraine) Lyudmyla Kichenok (Belarus) Polina Pekhova; 6–4, 6–2	(Slovakia) Michaela Hončová (Ukraine) Veronika Kapshay	(Ukraine) Lyudmyla Kichenok (Ukraine) Veronika Kapshay	(Turkey) Başak Eraydın (India) Ankita Raina (Japan) Erika Takao (Japan) Mari Tanaka
September 23, 2013	Varna, Bulgaria; Clay $10,000; Singles and doubles draws	(Bulgaria) Borislava Botusharova; 6–4, 1–6, 7–6^{(7–2)}	(Czech Republic) Pernilla Mendesová	(Bulgaria) Dia Evtimova (Romania) Raluca Elena Platon	(Czech Republic) Diana Šumová (Belgium) Michaela Boev (Romania) Elena-Teodora Cadar (Turkey) Hülya Esen
September 23, 2013	Varna, Bulgaria; Clay $10,000; Singles and doubles draws	(Romania) Raluca Elena Platon (Netherlands) Eva Wacanno; 6–3, 6–4	(Belgium) Michaela Boev (Romania) Camelia Hristea	(Bulgaria) Dia Evtimova (Romania) Raluca Elena Platon	(Czech Republic) Diana Šumová (Belgium) Michaela Boev (Romania) Elena-Teodora Cadar (Turkey) Hülya Esen
September 23, 2013	Prague, Czech Republic; Clay $10,000; Singles and doubles draws	(Russia) Ekaterina Alexandrova; 6–3, 3–6, 6–2	(Slovakia) Lenka Juríková	(Slovakia) Michaela Pochabová (Czech Republic) Jesika Malečková	(Czech Republic) Dominika Paterová (Slovakia) Nikola Vajdová (Czech Republic) Sandra Hönigová (Czech Republic) Tereza Malíková
September 23, 2013	Prague, Czech Republic; Clay $10,000; Singles and doubles draws	(Czech Republic) Jesika Malečková (Czech Republic) Tereza Malíková; 6–2, 6–2	(Germany) Jil Nora Engelmann (Austria) Yvonne Neuwirth	(Slovakia) Michaela Pochabová (Czech Republic) Jesika Malečková	(Czech Republic) Dominika Paterová (Slovakia) Nikola Vajdová (Czech Republic) Sandra Hönigová (Czech Republic) Tereza Malíková
September 23, 2013	Sharm el-Sheikh, Egypt; Hard $10,000; Singles and doubles draws	(Turkey) İpek Soylu; 4–6, 6–0, 6–2	(Italy) Giulia Bruzzone	(India) Rishika Sunkara (Sweden) Brenda Njuki	(Russia) Viktoriya Bogoslovskaya (Ukraine) Anastasiya Shestakova (United Kingdom) Laura Deigman (Russia) Evgeniya Svintsova
September 23, 2013	Sharm el-Sheikh, Egypt; Hard $10,000; Singles and doubles draws	(Italy) Giulia Bruzzone (Brazil) Karina Venditti; 7–6^{(7–4)}, 6–4	(Russia) Viktoriya Bogoslovskaya (Russia) Evgeniya Svintsova	(India) Rishika Sunkara (Sweden) Brenda Njuki	(Russia) Viktoriya Bogoslovskaya (Ukraine) Anastasiya Shestakova (United Kingdom) Laura Deigman (Russia) Evgeniya Svintsova
September 23, 2013	Marathon-Athens, Greece; Hard $10,000; Singles and doubles draws	(Russia) Aminat Kushkhova; 6–0, 7–5	(Greece) Maria Sakkari	(Uzbekistan) Vlada Ekshibarova (Austria) Janina Toljan	(Chinese Taipei) Lee Pei-chi (Italy) Camilla Rosatello (Italy) Francesca Palmigiano (Greece) Agni Stefanou
September 23, 2013	Marathon-Athens, Greece; Hard $10,000; Singles and doubles draws	(Israel) Keren Shlomo (Israel) Saray Sterenbach; 3–6, 6–1, [10–8]	(Chinese Taipei) Lee Pei-chi (Greece) Maria Sakkari	(Uzbekistan) Vlada Ekshibarova (Austria) Janina Toljan	(Chinese Taipei) Lee Pei-chi (Italy) Camilla Rosatello (Italy) Francesca Palmigiano (Greece) Agni Stefanou
September 23, 2013	Santa Margherita di Pula, Italy; Clay $10,000; Singles and doubles draws	(Italy) Alice Balducci; 6–2, 6–4	(Italy) Claudia Giovine	(Italy) Jasmine Paolini (France) Jade Suvrijn	(Italy) Annalisa Bona (Germany) Laura Schaeder (Netherlands) Quirine Lemoine (Hungary) Vanda Lukács
September 23, 2013	Santa Margherita di Pula, Italy; Clay $10,000; Singles and doubles draws	(Italy) Claudia Giovine (Italy) Alice Matteucci; 1–6, 6–3, [10–5]	(Germany) Carolin Daniels (Germany) Laura Schaeder	(Italy) Jasmine Paolini (France) Jade Suvrijn	(Italy) Annalisa Bona (Germany) Laura Schaeder (Netherlands) Quirine Lemoine (Hungary) Vanda Lukács
September 23, 2013	Lambaré, Paraguay; Clay $10,000; Singles and doubles draws	(Paraguay) Montserrat González; 6–2, 6–1	(United States) Lauren Albanese	(Argentina) Victoria Bosio (Brazil) Eduarda Piai	(Paraguay) Gabriela Ferreira Sanabria (Brazil) Nathália Rossi (Argentina) Sofía Blanco (Chile) Fernanda Brito
September 23, 2013	Lambaré, Paraguay; Clay $10,000; Singles and doubles draws	(Argentina) Carla Bruzzesi Avella (Argentina) Carolina Zeballos; 6–2, 7–5	(Paraguay) Sara Giménez (Paraguay) Montserrat González	(Argentina) Victoria Bosio (Brazil) Eduarda Piai	(Paraguay) Gabriela Ferreira Sanabria (Brazil) Nathália Rossi (Argentina) Sofía Blanco (Chile) Fernanda Brito
September 23, 2013	Monastir, Tunisia; Hard $10,000; Singles and doubles draws	(Germany) Linda Prenkovic; 6–1, 6–4	(France) Victoria Muntean	(Spain) Carmen López Rueda (Italy) Alice Savoretti	(Finland) Mia Nicole Eklund (Netherlands) Bernice van de Velde (Russia) Liudmila Vasilyeva (Ukraine) Khristina Kazimova
September 23, 2013	Monastir, Tunisia; Hard $10,000; Singles and doubles draws	(Germany) Linda Prenkovic (Netherlands) Bernice van de Velde; 6–2, 4–6, [10–7]	(Ukraine) Khristina Kazimova (Russia) Varvara Kuznetsova	(Spain) Carmen López Rueda (Italy) Alice Savoretti	(Finland) Mia Nicole Eklund (Netherlands) Bernice van de Velde (Russia) Liudmila Vasilyeva (Ukraine) Khristina Kazimova
September 23, 2013	Antalya, Turkey; Clay $10,000; Singles and doubles draws	(France) Sherazad Benamar; 6–7^{(1–7)}, 6–1, 3–0, ret.	(Germany) Lena-Marie Hofmann	(Belarus) Iryna Shymanovich (Slovakia) Chantal Škamlová	(Russia) Aleksandra Zenovka (Philippines) Katharina Lehnert (Germany) Anna Klasen (Germany) Sonja Larsen
September 23, 2013	Antalya, Turkey; Clay $10,000; Singles and doubles draws	(Germany) Lena-Marie Hofmann (Germany) Anna Klasen; 6–2, 6–2	(Thailand) Kamonwan Buayam (Czech Republic) Barbora Štefková	(Belarus) Iryna Shymanovich (Slovakia) Chantal Škamlová	(Russia) Aleksandra Zenovka (Philippines) Katharina Lehnert (Germany) Anna Klasen (Germany) Sonja Larsen
September 23, 2013	Amelia Island, United States; Clay $10,000; Singles and doubles draws	(United States) Tornado Alicia Black; 4–6, 6–0, 6–0	(United States) Alexandra Mueller	(United States) Alexandra Cercone (Belgium) Sofie Oyen	(United States) Josie Kuhlmann (United States) Marie Norris (United Kingdom) Amy Sargeant (United States) Ellie Halbauer
September 23, 2013	Amelia Island, United States; Clay $10,000; Singles and doubles draws	(Brazil) Maria Fernanda Alves (United States) Alexandra Mueller; 7–5, 6–3	(United States) Roxanne Ellison (United States) Sierra Ellison	(United States) Alexandra Cercone (Belgium) Sofie Oyen	(United States) Josie Kuhlmann (United States) Marie Norris (United Kingdom) Amy Sargeant (United States) Ellie Halbauer
September 30, 2013	Perth, Australia; Hard $25,000; Singles and doubles draws	(Russia) Arina Rodionova; 7–5, 6–4	(United States) Irina Falconi	(Australia) Olivia Rogowska (Japan) Sachie Ishizu	(Australia) Tammi Patterson (Japan) Yurika Sema (Japan) Hiroko Kuwata (Australia) Viktorija Rajicic
September 30, 2013	Perth, Australia; Hard $25,000; Singles and doubles draws	(Japan) Erika Sema (Japan) Yurika Sema; 7–5, 6–1	(Australia) Monique Adamczak (Australia) Tammi Patterson	(Australia) Olivia Rogowska (Japan) Sachie Ishizu	(Australia) Tammi Patterson (Japan) Yurika Sema (Japan) Hiroko Kuwata (Australia) Viktorija Rajicic
September 30, 2013	Budapest, Hungary; Clay $25,000; Singles and doubles draws	(Czech Republic) Kateřina Siniaková; 3–6, 6–2, 6–1	(Italy) Alberta Brianti	(Slovakia) Rebecca Šramková (Italy) Anastasia Grymalska	(Croatia) Ana Savić (Serbia) Marina Kachar (Poland) Paula Kania (Switzerland) Timea Bacsinszky
September 30, 2013	Budapest, Hungary; Clay $25,000; Singles and doubles draws	(Switzerland) Timea Bacsinszky (Switzerland) Xenia Knoll; 7–6^{(7–3)}, 6–2	(Hungary) Réka-Luca Jani (Ukraine) Veronika Kapshay	(Slovakia) Rebecca Šramková (Italy) Anastasia Grymalska	(Croatia) Ana Savić (Serbia) Marina Kachar (Poland) Paula Kania (Switzerland) Timea Bacsinszky
September 30, 2013	La Vall d'Uixó, Spain; Clay $25,000; Singles and doubles draws	(Netherlands) Arantxa Rus; 6–1, 6–1	(France) Alizé Lim	(Spain) Sara Sorribes Tormo (Brazil) Teliana Pereira	(Bulgaria) Aleksandrina Naydenova (Spain) Paula Badosa (Sweden) Rebecca Peterson (United Kingdom) Amanda Carreras
September 30, 2013	La Vall d'Uixó, Spain; Clay $25,000; Singles and doubles draws	(Argentina) Florencia Molinero (France) Laura Thorpe; 6–1, 6–4	(Netherlands) Cindy Burger (Netherlands) Arantxa Rus	(Spain) Sara Sorribes Tormo (Brazil) Teliana Pereira	(Bulgaria) Aleksandrina Naydenova (Spain) Paula Badosa (Sweden) Rebecca Peterson (United Kingdom) Amanda Carreras
September 30, 2013	Victoria, Mexico; Hard $15,000; Singles and doubles draws	(Mexico) Victoria Rodríguez; 6–2, 4–6, 4–0, ret.	(Mexico) Ana Sofía Sánchez	(United States) Chieh-Yu Hsu (Bolivia) María Fernanda Álvarez Terán	(Canada) Françoise Abanda (Chile) Andrea Koch Benvenuto (Canada) Sonja Molnar (Canada) Élisabeth Fournier
September 30, 2013	Victoria, Mexico; Hard $15,000; Singles and doubles draws	(Bolivia) María Fernanda Álvarez Terán (Argentina) María Irigoyen; 7–6^{(7–2)}, 6–3	(United States) Chieh-Yu Hsu (Mexico) Ana Sofía Sánchez	(United States) Chieh-Yu Hsu (Bolivia) María Fernanda Álvarez Terán	(Canada) Françoise Abanda (Chile) Andrea Koch Benvenuto (Canada) Sonja Molnar (Canada) Élisabeth Fournier
September 30, 2013	Albena, Bulgaria; Clay $10,000; Singles and doubles draws	(Bulgaria) Vivian Zlatanova; 6–3, 3–6, 7–6^{(7–5)}	(Bulgaria) Borislava Botusharova	(Bulgaria) Isabella Shinikova (Bulgaria) Dessislava Zlateva	(Bulgaria) Aleksandra Karamanoleva (North Macedonia) Lina Gjorcheska (Bulgaria) Nikol Yordanova (Bulgaria) Dalia Zafirova
September 30, 2013	Albena, Bulgaria; Clay $10,000; Singles and doubles draws	(Netherlands) Eva Wacanno (Bulgaria) Dalia Zafirova; 4–6, 6–2, [10–8]	(North Macedonia) Lina Gjorcheska (Romania) Camelia Hristea	(Bulgaria) Isabella Shinikova (Bulgaria) Dessislava Zlateva	(Bulgaria) Aleksandra Karamanoleva (North Macedonia) Lina Gjorcheska (Bulgaria) Nikol Yordanova (Bulgaria) Dalia Zafirova
September 30, 2013	Solin, Croatia; Clay $10,000; Singles and doubles draws	(Czech Republic) Barbora Krejčíková; 6–2, 6–2	(Czech Republic) Tereza Malíková	(Czech Republic) Gabriela Pantůčková (Slovenia) Polona Reberšak	(Bosnia and Herzegovina) Katarina Jokić (Croatia) Jana Fett (Czech Republic) Nina Holanová (Croatia) Petra Granić
September 30, 2013	Solin, Croatia; Clay $10,000; Singles and doubles draws	(Bosnia and Herzegovina) Dea Herdželaš (Slovakia) Barbara Kötelesová; 7–6^{(7–4)}, 6–3	(Czech Republic) Gabriela Pantůčková (Czech Republic) Dominika Paterová	(Czech Republic) Gabriela Pantůčková (Slovenia) Polona Reberšak	(Bosnia and Herzegovina) Katarina Jokić (Croatia) Jana Fett (Czech Republic) Nina Holanová (Croatia) Petra Granić
September 30, 2013	Sharm el-Sheikh, Egypt; Hard $10,000; Singles and doubles draws	(Russia) Anna Morgina; 6–3, 3–6, 7–5	(Turkey) İpek Soylu	(Ukraine) Helen Ploskina (Russia) Yana Sizikova	(Switzerland) Samira Giger (United Kingdom) Laura Deigman (India) Rishika Sunkara (Italy) Giulia Bruzzone
September 30, 2013	Sharm el-Sheikh, Egypt; Hard $10,000; Singles and doubles draws	(Russia) Anna Morgina (Russia) Yana Sizikova; 6–2, 6–3	(Italy) Giulia Bruzzone (Brazil) Karina Venditti	(Ukraine) Helen Ploskina (Russia) Yana Sizikova	(Switzerland) Samira Giger (United Kingdom) Laura Deigman (India) Rishika Sunkara (Italy) Giulia Bruzzone
September 30, 2013	Marathon-Athens, Greece; Hard $10,000; Singles and doubles draws	(Russia) Polina Leykina; 5–7, 6–4, 6–3	(Chinese Taipei) Lee Pei-chi	(Spain) Nuria Párrizas Díaz (Germany) Luisa Marie Huber	(Switzerland) Lisa Sabino (Israel) Keren Shlomo (Poland) Natalia Siedliska (Poland) Paulina Czarnik
September 30, 2013	Marathon-Athens, Greece; Hard $10,000; Singles and doubles draws	(Russia) Aminat Kushkhova (Russia) Polina Leykina; 7–5, 6–3	(Germany) Franziska König (Switzerland) Lisa Sabino	(Spain) Nuria Párrizas Díaz (Germany) Luisa Marie Huber	(Switzerland) Lisa Sabino (Israel) Keren Shlomo (Poland) Natalia Siedliska (Poland) Paulina Czarnik
September 30, 2013	Asunción, Paraguay; Clay $10,000; Singles and doubles draws	(Peru) Bianca Botto; 6–7^{(6–8)}, 6–2, 6–2	(Argentina) Carolina Zeballos	(Brazil) Gabriela Cé (Brazil) Eduarda Piai	(Paraguay) Montserrat González (Paraguay) Camila Giangreco Campiz (Brazil) Nathaly Kurata (Brazil) Nathália Rossi
September 30, 2013	Asunción, Paraguay; Clay $10,000; Singles and doubles draws	(Argentina) Carla Bruzzesi Avella (Argentina) Carolina Zeballos; 6–1, 6–3	(Argentina) Victoria Bosio (Chile) Fernanda Brito	(Brazil) Gabriela Cé (Brazil) Eduarda Piai	(Paraguay) Montserrat González (Paraguay) Camila Giangreco Campiz (Brazil) Nathaly Kurata (Brazil) Nathália Rossi
September 30, 2013	Monastir, Tunisia; Hard $10,000; Singles and doubles draws	(Russia) Maria Marfutina; 6–2, 6–2	(Spain) Arabela Fernández Rabener	(Germany) Linda Prenkovic (Netherlands) Bernice van de Velde	(Tunisia) Yessmine Zhir (France) Victoria Muntean (Italy) Alice Savoretti (Russia) Liudmila Vasilyeva
September 30, 2013	Monastir, Tunisia; Hard $10,000; Singles and doubles draws	(Germany) Linda Prenkovic (Netherlands) Bernice van de Velde; 6–2, 6–4	(Russia) Maria Marfutina (Switzerland) Nina Stadler	(Germany) Linda Prenkovic (Netherlands) Bernice van de Velde	(Tunisia) Yessmine Zhir (France) Victoria Muntean (Italy) Alice Savoretti (Russia) Liudmila Vasilyeva
September 30, 2013	Antalya, Turkey; Clay $10,000; Singles and doubles draws	(Russia) Julia Samuseva; 6–1, 6–0	(Sweden) Susanne Celik	(Germany) Sonja Larsen (Czech Republic) Zuzana Zálabská	(Romania) Patricia Lancranjan (Belgium) Marie Benoît (Philippines) Katharina Lehnert (Netherlands) Monique Zuur
September 30, 2013	Antalya, Turkey; Clay $10,000; Singles and doubles draws	(Ukraine) Olena Kyrpot (Russia) Julia Samuseva; 4–6, 6–3, [10–3]	(Belarus) Iryna Shymanovich (Russia) Aleksandra Zenovka	(Germany) Sonja Larsen (Czech Republic) Zuzana Zálabská	(Romania) Patricia Lancranjan (Belgium) Marie Benoît (Philippines) Katharina Lehnert (Netherlands) Monique Zuur
September 30, 2013	Hilton Head Island, United States; Clay $10,000; Singles and doubles draws	(United States) Ellie Halbauer; 7–6^{(7–5)}, 7–5	(United States) Alexandra Mueller	(Norway) Ulrikke Eikeri (United States) Raveena Kingsley	(Brazil) Maria Fernanda Alves (United States) Peggy Porter (Italy) Francesca Fusinato (United States) Maddie Pothoff
September 30, 2013	Hilton Head Island, United States; Clay $10,000; Singles and doubles draws	(United States) Alexandra Mueller (Canada) Jillian O'Neill; 6–4, 6–1	(United States) Kristi Boxx (New Zealand) Abigail Guthrie	(Norway) Ulrikke Eikeri (United States) Raveena Kingsley	(Brazil) Maria Fernanda Alves (United States) Peggy Porter (Italy) Francesca Fusinato (United States) Maddie Pothoff
