= 2024 Polish Open =

- Date: 22–28 July 2024
- Edition: 5th
- Category: WTA 125
- Prize money: $115,000
- Surface: Hard / Outdoor
- Location: Warsaw, Poland

Champions

Singles
- (United States) Alycia Parks

Doubles
- (Poland) Weronika Falkowska / (Poland) Martyna Kubka
← 2023 ·	Polish Open	· 2025 →

The 2024 Polish Open was a professional women's tennis tournament played on outdoor hard courts. It was the fifth edition of the tournament and second as a WTA 125 event which is also part of the 2024 WTA 125 tournaments. It took place at the Legia Tennis Centre in Warsaw, Poland between 22 and 28 July 2024 after the previous editions had been held in Grodzisk Mazowiecki.

== Singles main draw entrants ==
=== Seeds ===
Country	Player	Rank^{1}	Seed
SVK	Rebecca Šramková	109	1
JPN	Mai Hontama	110	2
LAT	Darja Semeņistaja	122	3
PHI	Alexandra Eala	155	4
AUS	Maya Joint	161	5
UKR	Kateryna Baindl	169	6
SUI	Céline Naef	185	7
	Valeria Savinykh	186	8

- ^{1} Rankings are as of 15 July 2024.

=== Other entrants ===
The following players received wildcards into the singles main draw:

- (Poland) Weronika Ewald
- (Poland) Weronika Falkowska
- (Poland) Gina Feistel
- (Poland) Martyna Kubka

The following players received entry into the singles main draw using special rankings:

- (Kazakhstan) Zarina Diyas
- (Serbia) Nina Stojanović

The following players received entry from the qualifying draw:

- (Australia) Destanee Aiava
- (Israel) Lina Glushko
- (United States) Alycia Parks
- (Poland) Urszula Radwańska

The following player received entry as a lucky loser:

- (Poland) Anna Hertel

=== Withdrawals ===
- (China) Bai Zhuoxuan → replaced by (France) Carole Monnet
- (Australia) Kimberly Birrell → replaced by (India) Ankita Raina
- (United Kingdom) Harriet Dart → replaced by (Croatia) Antonia Ružić
- (France) Océane Dodin → replaced by (Cyprus) Raluca Șerban
- (United States) Ann Li → replaced by (Bulgaria) Isabella Shinikova
- (Argentina) Solana Sierra → replaced by (Poland) Anna Hertel
- (Ukraine) Daria Snigur → replaced by (Czech Republic) Linda Klimovičová
- (New Zealand) Lulu Sun → replaced by (Poland) Maja Chwalińska

== Doubles main-draw entrants ==
=== Seeds ===
Country	Player	Country	Player	Rank^{1}	Seed
USA	Jessie Aney	GER	Lena Papadakis	302	1
POL	Weronika Falkowska	POL	Martyna Kubka	308	2

- ^{1} Rankings are as of 15 July 2024.

=== Other entrants ===
The following pair received a wildcard into the singles main draw:

- (Poland) Weronika Ewald / (Poland) Zuzanna Kolonus

== Champions ==
=== Singles ===
- (United States) Alycia Parks def. (Australia) Maya Joint, 4–6, 6–3, 6–3

=== Doubles ===
- (Poland) Weronika Falkowska / (Poland) Martyna Kubka def. (Switzerland) Céline Naef / (Serbia) Nina Stojanović, 6–4, 7–6^{(7–5)}
