= 2025 Polish Open – Singles =

Singles
- 2025 Polish Open

Final
- Champion: (Czech Republic) Kateřina Siniaková
- Runner-up: (Switzerland) Viktorija Golubic
- Score: 6–1, 6–2

Events
Singles	Doubles
← 2024 ·	Polish Open	· 2026 →

Kateřina Siniaková won the title, defeating Viktorija Golubic in the final, 6–1, 6–2.

Alycia Parks was the reigning champion, but chose to compete in Montreal instead.

== Seeds ==
1. (Hungary) Anna Bondár (second round)
2. (Turkey) Zeynep Sönmez (second round)
3. (Czech Republic) Kateřina Siniaková (champion)
4. (Switzerland) Viktorija Golubic (final)
5. (France) Diane Parry (second round)
6. (Germany) Ella Seidel (quarterfinals, retired)
7. (Andorra) Victoria Jiménez Kasintseva (semifinals)
8. (Liechtenstein) Kathinka von Deichmann (second round)

== Draw ==
Key

- Q = Qualifier
- WC = Wild card
- LL = Lucky loser
- Alt = Alternate
- ITF = ITF entry
- PR = Protected ranking
- SR = Special ranking
- SE = Special exempt
- JE = Junior exempt
- JR = Junior Accelerator Programme entrant
- CO = College Accelerator Programme entrant
- NG = Next Gen Accelerator Program entrant
- w/o = Walkover
- r = Retired
- d = Defaulted

=== Finals ===
Semifinals
7	(Andorra) Victoria Jiménez Kasintseva	4	0
3	(Czech Republic) Kateřina Siniaková	6	6
4	(Switzerland) Viktorija Golubic	7	6
(Czech Republic) Dominika Šalková	5	1

Final
3	(Czech Republic) Kateřina Siniaková	6	6
4	(Switzerland) Viktorija Golubic	1	2

=== Top half ===
First round
1	(Hungary) A Bondár	7^{12}	6
(United Kingdom) H Dart	6^{10}	3
(France) T Rakotomanga Rajaonah	2	2
PR	A Korneeva	6	6
(Japan) M Hontama	7	6
WC	(Poland) W Ewald	5	0
PR	(Slovenia) P Hercog	3	0
7	(Andorra) V Jiménez Kasintseva	6	6
3	(Czech Republic) K Siniaková	6	1	7
(Thailand) L Tararudee	1	6	5
A Charaeva	3	6	0
Q	(Finland) A Kulikova	6	1	0^{r}
(China) X Gao	7^{7}	6
(Germany) T Korpatsch	6^{4}	4
(Spain) A Lázaro García	2	3
6	(Germany) E Seidel	6	6

Second round
1	(Hungary) A Bondár	6	3	2
PR	A Korneeva	4	6	6
(Japan) M Hontama	4	6	2
7	(Andorra) V Jiménez Kasintseva	6	4	6
3	(Czech Republic) K Siniaková	6	6
A Charaeva	3	3
(China) X Gao	6	4	1^{r}
6	(Germany) E Seidel	4	6	3

Quarterfinals
PR	A Korneeva	3	2
7	(Andorra) V Jiménez Kasintseva	6	6
3	(Czech Republic) K Siniaková	6	1
6	(Germany) E Seidel	3	0^{r}

Semifinals
7	(Andorra) V Jiménez Kasintseva	4	0
3	(Czech Republic) K Siniaková	6	6

=== Bottom half ===
First round
5	(France) D Parry	6	6
WC	(Poland) M Stankiewicz	3	3
Q	(Czech Republic) G Knutson	6	4	4
(Ukraine) D Snigur	2	6	6
(Belgium) S Costoulas	4	6	6
WC	(Poland) M Kubka	6	3	3
Q	(Slovakia) V Hrunčáková	6	2	5
4	(Switzerland) V Golubic	1	6	7
8	(Liechtenstein) K von Deichmann	6	7^{7}
(Germany) A-L Friedsam	4	6^{0}
(Czech Republic) B Palicová	6^{1}	5
(Japan) K Okamura	7^{7}	7
(Czech Republic) D Šalková	1	7	6
WC	(Poland) W Falkowska	6	5	3
Q	(Poland) U Radwańska	2	0
2	(Turkey) Z Sönmez	6	6

Second round
5	(France) D Parry	6	4	4
(Ukraine) D Snigur	4	6	6
(Belgium) S Costoulas	7	3	3
4	(Switzerland) V Golubic	5	6	6
8	(Liechtenstein) K von Deichmann	6	2	2
(Japan) K Okamura	2	6	6
(Czech Republic) D Šalková	6	6
2	(Turkey) Z Sönmez	3	2

Quarterfinals
(Ukraine) D Snigur	5	3
4	(Switzerland) V Golubic	7	6
(Japan) K Okamura	6	3	2
(Czech Republic) D Šalková	4	6	6

Semifinals
4	(Switzerland) V Golubic	7	6
(Czech Republic) D Šalková	5	1

== Qualifying ==
=== Seeds ===
1. (Spain) Irene Burillo (qualifying competition)
2. (Slovakia) Viktória Hrunčáková (qualified)
3. (Australia) Taylah Preston (qualifying competition)
4. (Switzerland) Valentina Ryser (qualifying competition)

=== Qualifiers ===
1. (Finland) Anastasia Kulikova
2. (Slovakia) Viktória Hrunčáková
3. (Czech Republic) Gabriela Knutson
4. (Poland) Urszula Radwańska

==== First qualifier ====
Qualifying competition
1	(Spain) Irene Burillo	3	6	1
	(Finland) Anastasia Kulikova	6	4	6

==== Second qualifier ====
Qualifying competition
2	(Slovakia) Viktória Hrunčáková	5
WC	(Poland) Nadia Kulbiej	1^{r}

==== Third qualifier ====
Qualifying competition
3	(Australia) Taylah Preston	0	4
	(Czech Republic) Gabriela Knutson	6	6

==== Fourth qualifier ====
Qualifying competition
4	(Switzerland) Valentina Ryser	6	1	1
WC	(Poland) Urszula Radwańska	3	6	6
