= 2024 Polish Open – Singles =

Singles
- 2024 Polish Open

Final
- Champion: (United States) Alycia Parks
- Runner-up: (Australia) Maya Joint
- Score: 4–6, 6–3, 6–3

Events
Singles	Doubles
← 2023 ·	Polish Open	· 2025 →

Dayana Yastremska was the reigning champion, but chose not to participate this year.

Alycia Parks won the title, defeating Maya Joint in the final, 4–6, 6–3, 6–3.

== Seeds ==
1. (Slovakia) Rebecca Šramková (first round)
2. (Japan) Mai Hontama (second round)
3. (Latvia) Darja Semeņistaja (quarterfinals)
4. (Philippines) Alex Eala (first round)
5. (Australia) Maya Joint (final)
6. (Ukraine) Kateryna Baindl (first round)
7. (Switzerland) Céline Naef (first round)
8. Valeria Savinykh (first round)

== Draw ==
=== Key ===
- Q = Qualifier
- WC = Wild card
- LL = Lucky loser
- Alt = Alternate
- SE = Special exempt
- PR = Protected ranking
- ITF = ITF entry
- JE = Junior exempt
- w/o = Walkover
- r = Retired
- d = Defaulted
- SR = Special ranking

=== Finals ===
Semifinals
5	(Australia) Maya Joint	6	2	6
(Poland) Maja Chwalińska	2	6	0
Q	(United States) Alycia Parks	7^{7}	3	6
(Switzerland) Leonie Küng	6^{4}	6	2

Final
5	(Australia) Maya Joint	6	3	3
Q	(United States) Alycia Parks	4	6	6

=== Top half ===
First round
1	(Slovakia) R Šramková	1	2
(Georgia (country)) M Bolkvadze	6	6
WC	(Poland) G Feistel	6	5	6
(Cyprus) R Șerban	2	7	4
SR	(Serbia) N Stojanović	4	6	6
(Slovakia) V Hrunčáková	6	4	3
(Croatia) A Ružić	7	2	3
5	(Australia) M Joint	5	6	6
3	(Latvia) D Semeņistaja	7^{7}	0
(Poland) K Kawa	6^{4}	0^{r}
(France) A Albié	6	0	2
Q	(Poland) U Radwańska	2	6	6
WC	(Poland) M Kubka	6	6^{4}	6^{2}
SR	(Kazakhstan) Z Diyas	3	7^{7}	7^{7}
(Poland) M Chwalińska	3	7	6
7	(Switzerland) C Naef	6	5	1

Second round
(Georgia (country)) M Bolkvadze	2	6	6
WC	(Poland) G Feistel	6	2	3
SR	(Serbia) N Stojanović	3	6	1
5	(Australia) M Joint	6	2	6
3	(Latvia) D Semeņistaja	6	6
Q	(Poland) U Radwańska	4	3
SR	(Kazakhstan) Z Diyas	4	0
(Poland) M Chwalińska	6	6

Quarterfinals
(Georgia (country)) M Bolkvadze	0	4
5	(Australia) M Joint	6	6
3	(Latvia) D Semeņistaja	5	6	2
(Poland) M Chwalińska	7	4	6

Semifinals
5	(Australia) M Joint	6	2	6
(Poland) M Chwalińska	2	6	0

=== Bottom half ===
First round
8	V Savinykh	4	3
(Czech Republic) L Klimovičová	6	6
LL	(Poland) A Hertel	3	6	1
Q	(United States) A Parks	6	4	6
(Serbia) N Stevanović	3	2
Q	(Australia) D Aiava	6	6
(Bulgaria) I Shinikova	6	6
4	(Philippines) A Eala	2	4
6	(Ukraine) K Baindl	2	5
Q	(Israel) L Glushko	6	7
WC	(Poland) W Falkowska	4	2
(France) C Monnet	6	6
(Switzerland) L Küng	6	2	6
WC	(Poland) W Ewald	4	6	2
(India) A Raina	5	2
2	(Japan) M Hontama	7	6

Second round
(Czech Republic) L Klimovičová	2	3
Q	(United States) A Parks	6	6
Q	(Australia) D Aiava	1	4
(Bulgaria) I Shinikova	6	6
Q	(Israel) L Glushko	6	6
(France) C Monnet	3	4
(Switzerland) L Küng	6	3	6
2	(Japan) M Hontama	3	6	3

Quarterfinals
Q	(United States) A Parks	7	6
(Bulgaria) I Shinikova	5	2
Q	(Israel) L Glushko	1	6	3
(Switzerland) L Küng	6	3	6

Semifinals
Q	(United States) A Parks	7^{7}	3	6
(Switzerland) L Küng	6^{4}	6	2

== Qualifying ==
=== Seeds ===
1. (United States) Alycia Parks (qualified)
2. (Australia) Destanee Aiava (qualified)
3. (Israel) Lina Glushko (qualified)
4. (Poland) Urszula Radwańska (qualified)

=== Qualifiers ===
1. (United States) Alycia Parks
2. (Australia) Destanee Aiava
3. (Israel) Lina Glushko
4. (Poland) Urszula Radwańska

=== Lucky loser ===
1. (Poland) Anna Hertel

==== First qualifier ====
Qualifying competition
1	(United States) Alycia Parks	6	6
WC	(Poland) Zuzanna Kolonus	3	0

==== Second qualifier ====
Qualifying competition
2	(Australia) Destanee Aiava	6	6
WC	(Poland) Marcelina Podlińska	2	0

==== Third qualifier ====
Qualifying competition
3	(Israel) Lina Glushko	6	6
	(Poland) Anna Hertel	1	4

==== Fourth qualifier ====
Qualifying competition
4	(Poland) Urszula Radwańska	6	4	6
	(United States) Christina Rosca	1	6	3
