= 2026 Polish Open – Singles =

Singles
- 2026 Polish Open

Final
- Champion: (United States) Carol Young Suh Lee
- Runner-up: (Czech Republic) Gabriela Knutson
- Score: 6–4, 7–5

Details
- Draw: 32
- Seeds: 8

Events
| Singles | Doubles |
- Polish Open

Kateřina Siniaková was the reigning champion, but chose to compete in Toronto instead.

Carol Young Suh Lee won the title, defeating Gabriela Knutson 6–4, 7–5 in the final.

== Seeds ==
1. (France) Elsa Jacquemot (first round)
2. (Germany) Ella Seidel (second round)
3. (China) Yuan Yue (second round)
4. (Belgium) Jeline Vandromme (withdrew)
5. (Poland) Katarzyna Kawa (second round)
6. (Ukraine) Veronika Podrez (second round)
7. (Germany) Noma Noha Akugue (second round)
8. (Serbia) Teodora Kostović (first round)

== Draw ==
Key

- Q = Qualifier
- WC = Wild card
- LL = Lucky loser
- Alt = Alternate
- ITF = ITF entry
- PR = Protected ranking
- SR = Special ranking
- SE = Special exempt
- JE = Junior exempt
- JR = Junior Accelerator Programme entrant
- CO = College Accelerator Programme entrant
- NG = Next Gen Accelerator Program entrant
- w/o = Walkover
- r = Retired
- d = Defaulted

=== Finals ===
Semifinals
(United States) Carol Young Suh Lee | 6 | 6
(Czech Republic) Vendula Valdmannová | 2 | 2
(Bulgaria) Elizara Yaneva | 6^{4} | 2
(Czech Republic) Gabriela Knutson | 7^{7} | 6

Final
(United States) Carol Young Suh Lee | 6 | 7
(Czech Republic) Gabriela Knutson | 4 | 5

=== Top half ===
First round
1 | (France) E Jacquemot | 4 | 4
(United States) CYS Lee | 6 | 6
A Falei | 6 | 6
Q | (Poland) U Radwańska | 3 | 2
WC | (Poland) A Paszun | 0 | 2
WC | (Poland) W Falkowska | 6 | 6
J Avdeeva | 2 | 3
7 | (Germany) N Noha Akugue | 6 | 6
LL | (Poland) M Podlińska | 1 | 2
(Czech Republic) V Valdmannová | 6 | 6
WC | (Poland) Z Pawlikowska | 6 | 6
Q | (Bulgaria) L Karatancheva | 4 | 2
(Slovakia) V Hrunčáková | 4 | 4
(Switzerland) S Bandecchi | 6 | 6
Q | (Australia) E Micic | 3 | 6^{4}
6 | (Ukraine) V Podrez | 6 | 7^{7}

Second round
(United States) CYS Lee | 2 | 6 | 6
A Falei | 6 | 3 | 1
WC | (Poland) W Falkowska | 3 | 7^{8} | 7
7 | (Germany) N Noha Akugue | 6 | 6^{6} | 5
(Czech Republic) V Valdmannová | 6 | 6
WC | (Poland) Z Pawlikowska | 3 | 4
(Switzerland) S Bandecchi | 6 | 6
6 | (Ukraine) V Podrez | 1 | 4

Quarterfinals
(United States) CYS Lee | 3 | 7^{7} | 6
WC | (Poland) W Falkowska | 6 | 6^{4} | 1
(Czech Republic) V Valdmannová | 7^{7} | 6
(Switzerland) S Bandecchi | 6^{4} | 4

Semifinals
(United States) CYS Lee | 6 | 6
(Czech Republic) V Valdmannová | 2 | 2

=== Bottom half ===
First round
8 | (Serbia) T Kostović | 6^{3} | 6 | 1
(Poland) M Kubka | 7^{7} | 2 | 6
(Czech Republic) L Samson | 5 | 3
(Germany) M Barthel | 7 | 6
(Poland) L Klimovičová | 6 | 5 | 1
(Bulgaria) E Yaneva | 2 | 7 | 6
Q | (United States) A Smith | 1 | 4
3 | (China) Y Yuan | 6 | 6
5 | (Poland) K Kawa | 4 | 6 | 7^{7}
(Czech Republic) L Fruhvirtová | 6 | 4 | 6^{5}
WC | (Poland) W Ewald | 6^{3} | 2
(Lithuania) J Mikulskytė | 7^{7} | 6
(Czech Republic) G Knutson | 6 | 6
(Belgium) S Costoulas | 2 | 4
(Hungary) D Gálfi | 2 | 2
2 | (Germany) E Seidel | 6 | 6

Second round
(Poland) M Kubka | 5 | 4
(Germany) M Barthel | 7 | 6
(Bulgaria) E Yaneva | 5 | 6 | 6
3 | (China) Y Yuan | 7 | 0 | 2
5 | (Poland) K Kawa | 5 | 6 | 1
(Lithuania) J Mikulskytė | 7 | 2 | 6
(Czech Republic) G Knutson | 6 | 6
2 | (Germany) E Seidel | 3 | 4

Quarterfinals
(Germany) M Barthel | 4 | 6 | 6^{5}
(Bulgaria) E Yaneva | 6 | 2 | 7^{7}
(Lithuania) J Mikulskytė | 2 | 4
(Czech Republic) G Knutson | 6 | 6

Semifinals
(Bulgaria) E Yaneva | 6^{4} | 2
(Czech Republic) G Knutson | 7^{7} | 6

== Qualifying ==
=== Seeds ===
1. (Australia) Elena Micic (qualified)
2. (Bulgaria) Lia Karatancheva (qualified)
3. (United States) Alana Smith (qualified)
4. (Poland) Marcelina Podlińska (qualifying competition, lucky loser)

=== Qualifiers ===
1. (Australia) Elena Micic
2. (Bulgaria) Lia Karatancheva
3. (United States) Alana Smith
4. (Poland) Urszula Radwańska

=== Lucky loser ===
1. (Poland) Marcelina Podlińska

=== Qualifying draw ===
==== First qualifier ====
| Qualifying competition |
| 1 | (Australia) Elena Micic | 7^{7} | 6 |
| | (Spain) Georgina García Pérez | 6^{4} | 4 |

==== Second qualifier ====
| Qualifying competition |
| 2 | (Bulgaria) Lia Karatancheva | 6 | 6 |
| WC | (Poland) Nika Hurkacz | 1 | 1 |

==== Third qualifier ====
| Qualifying competition |
| 3 | (United States) Alana Smith | 7^{7} | 6 |
| WC | (Poland) Daria Górska | 6^{5} | 1 |

==== Fourth qualifier ====
| Qualifying competition |
| 4 | (Poland) Marcelina Podlińska | 1 | 3 |
| WC | (Poland) Urszula Radwańska | 6 | 6 |
