= 2023 Polish Open =

- Date: 7–12 August 2023
- Edition: 4th
- Category: WTA 125
- Prize money: $115,000
- Surface: Hard / Outdoor
- Location: Grodzisk Mazowiecki, Poland

Champions

Singles
- (Ukraine) Dayana Yastremska

Doubles
- (Poland) Katarzyna Kawa / (France) Elixane Lechemia
← 2022 ·	Kozerki Open	· 2024 →

The 2023 Polish Open was a professional women's tennis tournament played on outdoor hard courts. It was the fourth edition of the tournament and first ever as a WTA 125 event which was also part of the 2023 WTA 125 tournaments. It took place at the Akademia Tenisowa Tenis Kozerki in Grodzisk Mazowiecki, Poland between 7 and 12 August 2023.

== Singles main draw entrants ==
=== Seeds ===
Country	Player	Rank^{1}	Seed
GER	Jule Niemeier	101	1
ITA	Lucrezia Stefanini	102	2
CZE	Tereza Martincová	109	3
BEL	Greet Minnen	112	4
SVK	Viktória Hrunčáková	117	5
~~ROU~~	~~Jaqueline Cristian~~	~~122~~	~~6~~
~~JPN~~	~~Nao Hibino~~	~~136~~	~~7~~
UKR	Dayana Yastremska	149	8
GER	Eva Lys	150	9

- ^{1} Rankings are as of 31 July 2023.

=== Other entrants ===
The following players received wildcards into the singles main draw:

- (Poland) Maja Chwalińska
- (Poland) Weronika Ewald
- (Poland) Martyna Kubka
- (Poland) Olivia Lincer

The following players received entry from the qualifying draw:

- (Czech Republic) Gabriela Knutson
- (Thailand) Luksika Kumkhum
- (Germany) Noma Noha Akugue
- (Czech Republic) Anna Sisková

The following players received entry as lucky losers:

- (United Kingdom) Naiktha Bains
- (Poland) Katarzyna Kawa

=== Withdrawals ===
- (Ukraine) Kateryna Baindl → replaced by (Slovenia) Dalila Jakupović
- (Romania) Jaqueline Cristian → replaced by (United Kingdom) Naiktha Bains
- (Serbia) Olga Danilović → replaced by (Turkey) Zeynep Sönmez
- (Germany) Anna-Lena Friedsam → replaced by (Czech Republic) Barbora Palicová
- (Japan) Nao Hibino → replaced by (Poland) Katarzyna Kawa
- (Belgium) Yanina Wickmayer → replaced by (Germany) Mona Barthel

== Doubles main-draw entrants ==
=== Seeds ===
Country	Player	Country	Player	Rank^{1}	Seed
GBR	Alicia Barnett	GBR	Olivia Nicholls	147	1
CZE	Anastasia Dețiuc	CZE	Anna Sisková	178	2
POL	Katarzyna Piter	CZE	Renata Voráčová	180	3
GBR	Naiktha Bains	GBR	Maia Lumsden	189	4

- ^{1} Rankings are as of 31 July 2023.

=== Other entrants ===
The following pair received a wildcard into the singles main draw:

- (Poland) Weronika Forys / (Poland) Stefania Rogozińska Dzik

== Champions ==
=== Singles ===
- (Ukraine) Dayana Yastremska def. (Belgium) Greet Minnen, 2–6, 6–1, 6–3

=== Doubles ===
- (Poland) Katarzyna Kawa / (France) Elixane Lechemia def. (United Kingdom) Naiktha Bains / (United Kingdom) Maia Lumsden, 6–3, 6–4
