= 2025 Polish Open =

- Date: 28 July–2 August 2025
- Edition: 6th
- Category: WTA 125
- Prize money: $115,000
- Surface: Hard / Outdoor
- Location: Warsaw, Poland

Champions

Singles
- (Czech Republic) Kateřina Siniaková

Doubles
- (Poland) Weronika Falkowska / (Czech Republic) Dominika Šalková
← 2024 ·	Polish Open	· 2026 →

The 2025 Polish Open (also known as the T-Mobile Polish Open for sponsorship reasons) was a professional women's tennis tournament played on outdoor hard courts. It was the sixth edition of the tournament and part of the 2025 WTA 125 tournaments. It took place at the Legia Tennis Centre in Warsaw, Poland between 28 July and 2 August 2025.

== Singles main draw entrants ==
=== Seeds ===
Country	Player	Rank^{1}	Seed
HUN	Anna Bondár	59	1
TUR	Zeynep Sönmez	75	2
CZE	Kateřina Siniaková	86	3
SUI	Viktorija Golubic	87	4
FRA	Diane Parry	110	5
GER	Ella Seidel	123	6
AND	Victoria Jiménez Kasintseva	141	7
LIE	Kathinka von Deichmann	154	8

- ^{1} Rankings are as of 21 July 2025.

=== Other entrants ===
The following players received wildcards into the singles main draw:

- (Poland) Weronika Ewald
- (Poland) Weronika Falkowska
- (Poland) Martyna Kubka
- (Poland) Monika Stankiewicz

The following players received entry into the singles main draw using special rankings:

- (Slovenia) Polona Hercog
- Alina Korneeva

The following players received entry from the qualifying draw:

- (Slovakia) Viktória Hrunčáková
- (Czech Republic) Gabriela Knutson
- (Finland) Anastasia Kulikova
- (Poland) Urszula Radwańska

== Doubles main-draw entrants ==
=== Seeds ===
Country	Player	Country	Player	Rank^{1}	Seed
GBR	Harriet Dart	GBR	Maia Lumsden	151	1
ESP	Yvonne Cavallé Reimers		Maria Kozyreva	180	2

- ^{1} Rankings are as of 21 July 2025.

== Champions ==
=== Singles ===
- (Czech Republic) Kateřina Siniaková def. (Switzerland) Viktorija Golubic 6–1, 6–2

=== Doubles ===
- (Poland) Weronika Falkowska / (Czech Republic) Dominika Šalková def. (Netherlands) Isabelle Haverlag / (Poland) Martyna Kubka 6–2, 6–1
