= 2023 Polish Open – Singles =

Singles
- 2023 Polish Open

Final
- Champion: (Ukraine) Dayana Yastremska
- Runner-up: (Belgium) Greet Minnen
- Score: 2–6, 6–1, 6–3

Details
- Draw: 32 (4 WC)
- Seeds: 8

Events
Singles	Doubles
← 2022 ·	Kozerki Open	· 2024 →

Dayana Yastremska won the singles title at the 2023 Polish Open, defeating Greet Minnen in the final, 2–6, 6-1, 6–3.

Kateřina Siniaková was the reigning champion, but chose to participate in the Canadian Open instead.

== Seeds ==
1. (Germany) Jule Niemeier (first round)
2. (Italy) Lucrezia Stefanini (first round)
3. (Czech Republic) Tereza Martincová (quarterfinals)
4. (Belgium) Greet Minnen (final)
5. (Slovakia) Viktória Hrunčáková (first round)
6. (Romania) Jaqueline Cristian (withdrew)
7. (Japan) Nao Hibino (withdrew)
8. (Ukraine) Dayana Yastremska (champion)
9. (Germany) Eva Lys (quarterfinals)

== Draw ==
=== Key ===
- Q = Qualifier
- WC = Wild card
- LL = Lucky loser
- Alt = Alternate
- SE = Special exempt
- PR = Protected ranking
- ITF = ITF entry
- JE = Junior exempt
- w/o = Walkover
- r = Retired
- d = Defaulted
- SR = Special ranking

=== Finals ===
Semifinals
WC	(Poland) Maja Chwalińska	4	3
4	(Belgium) Greet Minnen	6	6
8	(Ukraine) Dayana Yastremska	7^{7}	6
(Turkey) Zeynep Sönmez	6^{2}	4

Final
4	(Belgium) Greet Minnen	6	1	3
8	(Ukraine) Dayana Yastremska	2	6	6

=== Top half ===
First round
1	(Germany) J Niemeier	6	2	3
WC	(Poland) M Chwalińska	4	6	6
Q	(Czech Republic) A Sisková	7	6
(Austria) S Kraus	5	1
WC	(Poland) M Kubka	6	3	6
(Belgium) M Kempen	3	6	3
Q	(Thailand) L Kumkhum	5	6^{1}
LL	(Poland) K Kawa	7	7^{7}
4	(Belgium) G Minnen	6	6
(Croatia) P Marčinko	1	0
(Switzerland) S Bandecchi	7^{7}	7
(Czech Republic) L Havlíčková	6^{4}	5
(Germany) M Barthel	2	5
(Ukraine) K Zavatska	6	7
WC	(Poland) W Ewald	1	2
9	(Germany) E Lys	6	6

Second round
WC	(Poland) M Chwalińska	4	6	6
Q	(Czech Republic) A Sisková	6	4	1
WC	(Poland) M Kubka	3	7	6
LL	(Poland) K Kawa	6	5	3
4	(Belgium) G Minnen	6	6
(Switzerland) S Bandecchi	2	2
(Ukraine) K Zavatska	3	0
9	(Germany) E Lys	6	6

Quarterfinals
WC	(Poland) M Chwalińska	7^{11}	6
WC	(Poland) M Kubka	6^{9}	4
4	(Belgium) G Minnen	6	7^{7}
9	(Germany) E Lys	0	6^{4}

Semifinals
WC	(Poland) M Chwalińska	4	3
4	(Belgium) G Minnen	6	6

=== Bottom half ===
First round
8	(Ukraine) D Yastremska	7	7^{7}
(Uzbekistan) N Abduraimova	5	6^{5}
WC	(Poland) O Lincer	3	4
(Colombia) E Arango	6	6
LL	(United Kingdom) N Bains	4	4
(Latvia) D Semeņistaja	6	6
(Czech Republic) B Palicová	4	6^{6}
3	(Czech Republic) T Martincová	6	7^{8}
5	(Slovakia) V Hrunčáková	5	4
Q	(Germany) N Noha Akugue	7	6
(India) A Raina	2	3
Q	(Czech Republic) G Knutson	6	6
(Turkey) Z Sönmez	3	6	6
(Slovenia) D Jakupović	6	4	3
(Slovakia) R Šramková	6	5	6
2	(Italy) L Stefanini	4	7	2

Second round
8	(Ukraine) D Yastremska	6	6
(Colombia) E Arango	3	2
(Latvia) D Semeņistaja	6	5	3
3	(Czech Republic) T Martincová	4	7	6
Q	(Germany) N Noha Akugue	6	4	6
Q	(Czech Republic) G Knutson	2	6	1
(Turkey) Z Sönmez	1	6	6
(Slovakia) R Šramková	6	4	1

Quarterfinals
8	(Ukraine) D Yastremska	6^{3}	6	6
3	(Czech Republic) T Martincová	7^{7}	2	0
Q	(Germany) N Noha Akugue	1	6	4
(Turkey) Z Sönmez	6	1	6

Semifinals
8	(Ukraine) D Yastremska	7^{7}	6
(Turkey) Z Sönmez	6^{2}	4

== Qualifying ==
=== Seeds ===
1. (Germany) Noma Noha Akugue (qualified)
2. (Czech Republic) Gabriela Knutson (qualified)
3. (Poland) Katarzyna Kawa (qualifying competition, lucky loser)
4. (United Kingdom) Naiktha Bains (qualifying competition, lucky loser)
5. (Czech Republic) Anna Sisková (qualified)
6. (Thailand) Peangtarn Plipuech (first round)
7. (Germany) Sabine Lisicki (qualifying competition)
8. (Poland) Urszula Radwańska (first round)

=== Qualifiers ===
1. (Germany) Noma Noha Akugue
2. (Czech Republic) Gabriela Knutson
3. (Thailand) Luksika Kumkhum
4. (Czech Republic) Anna Sisková

=== Lucky losers ===
1. (United Kingdom) Naiktha Bains
2. (Poland) Katarzyna Kawa

=== Draw ===
==== First qualifier ====
First round
1	(Germany) Noma Noha Akugue	6	6
(United Kingdom) Freya Christie	3	4
WC	(Poland) Gina Feistel	2	6	6
8	(Poland) Urszula Radwańska	6	3	4

Qualifying competition
1	(Germany) Noma Noha Akugue	6	6^{3}	7
WC	(Poland) Gina Feistel	1	7^{7}	5

==== Second qualifier ====
First round
2	(Czech Republic) Gabriela Knutson	6	6
WC	(Poland) Stefania Rogozińska Dzik	2	1
(United Kingdom) Maia Lumsden	6^{4}	4
7	(Germany) Sabine Lisicki	7^{7}	6

Qualifying competition
2	(Czech Republic) Gabriela Knutson	6	6
7	(Germany) Sabine Lisicki	3	4

==== Third qualifier ====
First round
3	(Poland) Katarzyna Kawa	4	6	6
(Germany) Yana Morderger	6	2	0
(Thailand) Luksika Kumkhum	6	6
6	(Thailand) Peangtarn Plipuech	3	1

Qualifying competition
3	(Poland) Katarzyna Kawa	3	5
(Thailand) Luksika Kumkhum	6	7

==== Fourth qualifier ====
First round
4	(United Kingdom) Naiktha Bains	6	6
(Germany) Sarah-Rebecca Sekulic	1	3
(Germany) Tayisiya Morderger	3	1
5	(Czech Republic) Anna Sisková	6	6

Qualifying competition
4	(United Kingdom) Naiktha Bains	4	4
5	(Czech Republic) Anna Sisková	6	6
