= 2025 Polish Open – Doubles =

Doubles
- 2025 Polish Open

Final
- Champions: (Poland) Weronika Falkowska (Czech Republic) Dominika Šalková
- Runners-up: (Netherlands) Isabelle Haverlag (Poland) Martyna Kubka
- Score: 6–2, 6–1

Events
Singles	Doubles
← 2024 ·	Polish Open	· 2026 →

Weronika Falkowska and Dominika Šalková won the title, defeating Isabelle Haverlag and Martyna Kubka in the final, 6–2, 6–1.

Falkowska and Kubka were the reigning champions, but chose not to compete together.

== Seeds ==
1. (United Kingdom) Harriet Dart / (United Kingdom) Maia Lumsden (semifinals)
2. (Spain) Yvonne Cavallé Reimers / Maria Kozyreva (semifinals)

== Draw ==
=== Key ===
- Q = Qualifier
- WC = Wild card
- LL = Lucky loser
- Alt = Alternate
- ITF = ITF entry
- PR = Protected ranking
- SR = Special ranking
- SE = Special exempt
- JE = Junior exempt
- JR = Junior Accelerator Programme entrant
- CO = College Accelerator Programme entrant
- NG = Next Gen Accelerator Program entrant
- w/o = Walkover
- r = Retired
- d = Defaulted

=== Draw ===
Quarterfinals
1	(United Kingdom) H Dart (United Kingdom) M Lumsden	7	4	[10]
(Czech Republic) J Malečková (Czech Republic) M Škoch	5	6	[7]
(Poland) W Falkowska (Czech Republic) D Šalková	2	6	[10]
(Germany) A-L Friedsam (France) T Rakotomanga Rajaonah	6	2	[7]
(United Kingdom) A Barnett (France) E Lechemia	4	4
(Netherlands) I Haverlag (Poland) M Kubka	6	6
A Charaeva (Andorra) V Jiménez Kasintseva	4	5
2	(Spain) Y Cavallé Reimers; M Kozyreva	6	7

Semifinals
1	(United Kingdom) H Dart (United Kingdom) M Lumsden	2	5
(Poland) W Falkowska (Czech Republic) D Šalková	6	7
(Netherlands) I Haverlag (Poland) M Kubka	6	6
2	(Spain) Y Cavallé Reimers; M Kozyreva	1	4

Final
(Poland) W Falkowska (Czech Republic) D Šalková	6	6
(Netherlands) I Haverlag (Poland) M Kubka	2	1
