= 2023 Kozerki Open =

- Date: 14–19 August
- Edition: 2nd
- Surface: Hard
- Location: Grodzisk Mazowiecki, Poland

Champions

Singles
- (Netherlands) Jesper de Jong

Doubles
- (France) Théo Arribagé / (France) Luca Sanchez
- Kozerki Open

The 2023 Kozerki Open was a professional tennis tournament played on hard courts. It was the second edition of the tournament which was part of the 2023 ATP Challenger Tour. It took place in Grodzisk Mazowiecki, Poland between 14 and 19 August 2023.

== Singles main-draw entrants ==
=== Seeds ===
Country	Player	Rank^{1}	Seed
CZE	Tomáš Macháč	106	1
BEL	Joris De Loore	166	2
~~CZE~~	~~Zdeněk Kolář~~	~~169~~	~~3~~
AUS	Marc Polmans	173	4
NED	Jesper de Jong	178	5
SWE	Elias Ymer	179	6
NED	Jelle Sels	200	7
POR	Frederico Ferreira Silva	223	8

- ^{1} Rankings were as of 7 August 2023.

=== Other entrants ===
The following players received wildcards into the singles main draw:

- (Poland) Tomasz Berkieta
- (United States) Dali Blanch
- (Poland) Martyn Pawelski

The following players received entry into the singles main draw as alternates:

- (United Kingdom) Charles Broom
- (Norway) Viktor Durasovic
- (Germany) Peter Gojowczyk

The following players received entry from the qualifying draw:

- (Romania) Marius Copil
- (Czech Republic) David Poljak
- (Australia) Akira Santillan
- (Colombia) Adrià Soriano Barrera
- (Czech Republic) Jiří Veselý
- (Kazakhstan) Denis Yevseyev

The following player received entry as a lucky loser:

- (Greece) Stefanos Sakellaridis

== Champions ==
=== Singles ===
- (Netherlands) Jesper de Jong def. (Lebanon) Benjamin Hassan 6–3, 6–3.

=== Doubles ===
- (France) Théo Arribagé / (France) Luca Sanchez def. (India) Anirudh Chandrasekar / (India) Vijay Sundar Prashanth 6–4, 6–4.
