= 2023 Polish Open – Doubles =

Doubles
- 2023 Polish Open

Final
- Champions: (Poland) Katarzyna Kawa (France) Elixane Lechemia
- Runners-up: (United Kingdom) Naiktha Bains (United Kingdom) Maia Lumsden
- Score: 6–3, 6–4

Events
Singles	Doubles
← 2022 ·	Kozerki Open	· 2024 →

Katarzyna Kawa and Elixane Lechemia won the doubles title at the 2023 Polish Open, defeating Naiktha Bains and Maia Lumsden in the final, 6–3- 6–4.

Alicia Barnett and Olivia Nicholls were the defending champions from 2022, when the tournament was an ITF event, but lost in the quarterfinals to Ankita Raina and Dayana Yastremska.

== Seeds ==
1. (United Kingdom) Alicia Barnett / (United Kingdom) Olivia Nicholls (quarterfinals)
2. (Czech Republic) Anastasia Dețiuc / (Czech Republic) Anna Sisková (semifinals)
3. (Poland) Katarzyna Piter / (Czech Republic) Renata Voráčová (quarterfinals)
4. (United Kingdom) Naiktha Bains / (United Kingdom) Maia Lumsden (final)

== Draw ==
=== Key ===
- Q = Qualifier
- WC = Wild card
- LL = Lucky loser
- Alt = Alternate
- SE = Special exempt
- PR = Protected ranking
- ITF = ITF entry
- JE = Junior exempt
- w/o = Walkover
- r = Retired
- d = Defaulted
- SR = Special ranking

=== Draw ===
First round
1	(United Kingdom) A Barnett (United Kingdom) O Nicholls	7	6
(Poland) M Chwalińska (Slovakia) V Hrunčáková	5	2
(Germany) V Heisen (Australia) O Tjandramulia	6	3	[2]
(India) A Raina (Ukraine) D Yastremska	4	6	[10]
4	(United Kingdom) N Bains (United Kingdom) M Lumsden	7^{9}	6
(United Kingdom) F Christie (United Kingdom) A Collins	6^{7}	4
WC	(Poland) W Forys (Poland) S Rogozińska Dzik	0	1
(Thailand) L Kumkhum (Thailand) P Plipuech	6	6
(Poland) K Kawa (France) E Lechemia	6	6
(Belgium) M Kempen (United Kingdom) E Webley-Smith	0	3
(Slovenia) D Jakupović (Germany) J Lohoff	5	7^{7}	[12]
3	(Poland) K Piter (Czech Republic) R Voráčová	7	6^{3}	[14]
(Czech Republic) L Havlíčková (Croatia) P Marčinko	2	6^{4}
(Uzbekistan) N Abduraimova (Poland) M Kubka	6	7^{7}
(Czech Republic) G Knutson (Latvia) D Semeņistaja	6^{4}	4
2	(Czech Republic) A Dețiuc (Czech Republic) A Sisková	7^{7}	6

Quarterfinals
1	(United Kingdom) A Barnett (United Kingdom) O Nicholls	1	4
(India) A Raina (Ukraine) D Yastremska	6	6
4	(United Kingdom) N Bains (United Kingdom) M Lumsden	7	4	[11]
(Thailand) L Kumkhum (Thailand) P Plipuech	5	6	[9]
(Poland) K Kawa (France) E Lechemia	6^{3}	6	[10]
3	(Poland) K Piter (Czech Republic) R Voráčová	7^{7}	3	[4]
(Uzbekistan) N Abduraimova (Poland) M Kubka	4	3
2	(Czech Republic) A Dețiuc (Czech Republic) A Sisková	6	6

Semifinals
(India) A Raina (Ukraine) D Yastremska	3	3
4	(United Kingdom) N Bains (United Kingdom) M Lumsden	6	6
(Poland) K Kawa (France) E Lechemia	7^{7}	1	[10]
2	(Czech Republic) A Dețiuc (Czech Republic) A Sisková	6^{5}	6	[0]

Final
4	(United Kingdom) N Bains (United Kingdom) M Lumsden	3	4
(Poland) K Kawa (France) E Lechemia	6	6
