= 2024 Polish Open – Doubles =

Doubles
- 2024 Polish Open

Final
- Champions: (Poland) Weronika Falkowska (Poland) Martyna Kubka
- Runners-up: (Switzerland) Céline Naef (Serbia) Nina Stojanović
- Score: 6–4, 7–6^{(7–5)}

Events
Singles	Doubles
← 2023 ·	Polish Open	· 2025 →

Katarzyna Kawa and Elixane Lechemia were the defending champions but chose not to participate.

Weronika Falkowska and Martyna Kubka won the title, defeating Céline Naef and Nina Stojanović in the final, 6–4, 7–6^{(7–5)}.

== Seeds ==
1. (United States) Jessie Aney / (Germany) Lena Papadakis (semifinals)
2. (Poland) Weronika Falkowska / (Poland) Martyna Kubka (champions)

== Draw ==
=== Key ===
- Q = Qualifier
- WC = Wild card
- LL = Lucky loser
- Alt = Alternate
- SE = Special exempt
- PR = Protected ranking
- ITF = ITF entry
- JE = Junior exempt
- w/o = Walkover
- r = Retired
- d = Defaulted
- SR = Special ranking

Quarterfinals
1	(United States) J Aney (Germany) L Papadakis	6	6
(France) C Monnet (India) A Raina	2	1
(Switzerland) C Naef (Serbia) N Stojanović	6	6
(Netherlands) I Haverlag (United States) C Rosca	4	2
(Colombia) Y Lizarazo (Serbia) N Stevanović	4	6	[7]
WC	(Poland) W Ewald (Poland) Z Kolonus	6	4	[10]
(Philippines) A Eala (Latvia) D Semeņistaja	4	5
2	(Poland) W Falkowska (Poland) M Kubka	6	7

Semifinals
1	(United States) J Aney (Germany) L Papadakis	6^{4}	2
(Switzerland) C Naef (Serbia) N Stojanović	7^{7}	6
WC	(Poland) W Ewald (Poland) Z Kolonus	0	2
2	(Poland) W Falkowska (Poland) M Kubka	6	6

Final
(Switzerland) C Naef (Serbia) N Stojanović	4	6^{5}
2	(Poland) W Falkowska (Poland) M Kubka	6	7^{7}
