= 2026 Polish Open =

- Date: 3–9 August 2026
- Edition: 7th
- Category: WTA 125
- Prize money: €100,000
- Surface: Hard / Outdoor
- Location: Warsaw, Poland

Champions

Singles
- (United States) Carol Young Suh Lee

Doubles
- (Poland) Weronika Falkowska / (United States) Alana Smith
- Polish Open

The 2026 Polish Open (also known as the T-Mobile Polish Open for sponsorship reasons) was a professional women's tennis tournament played on outdoor hard courts. It was the seventh edition of the tournament and part of the 2026 WTA 125 tournaments. It took place at the Legia Tennis Centre in Warsaw, Poland between 3 and 9 August 2026.

== Singles main draw entrants ==
=== Seeds ===
Country	Player	Rank^{1}	Seed
FRA	Elsa Jacquemot	98	1
GER	Ella Seidel	102	2
CHN	Yuan Yue	125	3
~~BEL~~	~~Jeline Vandromme~~	~~128~~	~~4~~
POL	Katarzyna Kawa	131	5
UKR	Veronika Podrez	134	6
GER	Noma Noha Akugue	137	7
SRB	Teodora Kostović	146	8

- ^{1} Rankings are as of 27 July 2026.

=== Other entrants ===
The following players received wildcards into the singles main draw:

- (Poland) Weronika Ewald
- (Poland) Weronika Falkowska
- (Poland) Amelia Paszun
- (Poland) Zuzanna Pawlikowska

The following players received entry from the qualifying draw:

- (Bulgaria) Lia Karatancheva
- (Australia) Elena Micic
- (Poland) Urszula Radwańska
- (United States) Alana Smith

The following player received entry as a lucky loser:

- (Poland) Marcelina Podlińska

=== Withdrawals ===
- (China) Bai Zhuoxuan → replaced by Julia Avdeeva
- (Italy) Lucia Bronzetti → replaced by (Poland) Martyna Kubka
- (Chinese Taipei) Joanna Garland → replaced by (Germany) Mona Barthel
- (Switzerland) Rebeka Masarova → replaced by (Slovakia) Viktória Hrunčáková
- (Serbia) Lola Radivojević → replaced by (Czech Republic) Vendula Valdmannová
- Aliaksandra Sasnovich → replaced by Aliona Falei
- (Ukraine) Daria Snigur → replaced by (Bulgaria) Elizara Yaneva
- (Austria) Lilli Tagger → replaced by (United States) Carol Young Suh Lee
- (Belgium) Jeline Vandromme → replaced by (Poland) Marcelina Podlińska (LL)
- (Switzerland) Simona Waltert → replaced by (Czech Republic) Gabriela Knutson

== Doubles main-draw entrants ==
=== Seeds ===
Country	Player	Country	Player	Rank^{1}	Seed
FRA	Estelle Cascino	SLO	Nika Radišić	170	1
GBR	Madeleine Brooks	NED	Isabelle Haverlag	177	2

- ^{1} Rankings are as of 27 July 2026.

=== Other entrants ===
The following pairs received a wildcard into the doubles main draw:

- (Poland) Weronika Ewald / (Poland) Daria Górska

== Champions ==
=== Singles ===
- (United States) Carol Young Suh Lee def. (Czech Republic) Gabriela Knutson 6–4, 7–5

=== Doubles ===
- (Poland) Weronika Falkowska / (United States) Alana Smith def. (Poland) Martyna Kubka / (Poland) Alicja Rosolska 6–3, 6–1
