= 2025 Kozerki Open =

- Date: 4–10 August
- Edition: 4th
- Surface: Hard
- Location: Grodzisk Mazowiecki, Poland

Champions

Singles
- (Poland) Kamil Majchrzak

Doubles
- (Netherlands) Thijmen Loof / (France) Arthur Reymond
- Kozerki Open

The 2025 Kozerki Open was a professional tennis tournament played on hard courts. It was the fourth edition of the tournament which was part of the 2025 ATP Challenger Tour. It took place in Grodzisk Mazowiecki, Poland between 4 and 10 August 2025.

== Singles main-draw entrants ==
=== Seeds ===
Country	Player	Rank^{1}	Seed
POL	Kamil Majchrzak	81	1
CRO	Dino Prižmić	127	2
FRA	Harold Mayot	157	3
FRA	Kyrian Jacquet	163	4
SUI	Marc-Andrea Hüsler	174	5
ITA	Francesco Maestrelli	178	6
FRA	Calvin Hemery	181	7
FRA	Hugo Grenier	192	8

- ^{1} Rankings were as of 28 July 2025.

=== Other entrants ===
The following players received wildcards into the singles main draw:

- (Poland) Tomasz Berkieta
- (Poland) Maks Kaśnikowski
- (Poland) Olaf Pieczkowski

The following player received entry into the singles main draw using a protected ranking:

- Ilya Ivashka

The following player received entry into the singles main draw as a special exempt:

- (Italy) Alexandr Binda

The following player received entry into the singles main draw through the Next Gen Accelerator programme:

- (Czech Republic) Petr Brunclík

The following players received entry into the singles main draw as alternates:

- (China) Cui Jie
- (Italy) Giulio Zeppieri

The following players received entry from the qualifying draw:

- (Moldova) Radu Albot
- (Estonia) Daniil Glinka
- (Spain) Rafael Jódar
- (Thailand) Maximus Jones
- (Poland) Filip Pieczonka
- (Jordan) Abdullah Shelbayh

== Champions ==
=== Singles ===
- (Poland) Kamil Majchrzak def. (Croatia) Dino Prižmić 6–4, 6–3.

=== Doubles ===
- (Netherlands) Thijmen Loof / (France) Arthur Reymond def. (South Korea) Nam Ji-sung / (Japan) Takeru Yuzuki 6–4, 6–7^{(3–7)}, [16–14].
