= 2026 Polish Open – Doubles =

Doubles
- 2026 Polish Open

Final
- Champions: (Poland) Weronika Falkowska (United States) Alana Smith
- Runners-up: (Poland) Martyna Kubka (Poland) Alicja Rosolska
- Score: 6–3, 6–1

Details
- Draw: 8
- Seeds: 2

Events
Singles	Doubles
- Polish Open

Weronika Falkowska and Dominika Šalková were the reigning champions, but Šalková did not participate this year.

Falkowska partnered Alana Smith and won the title, defeating Martyna Kubka and Alicja Rosolska 6–3, 6–1 in the final.

== Seeds ==
1. (France) Estelle Cascino / (Slovenia) Nika Radišić (quarterfinals)
2. (United Kingdom) Madeleine Brooks / (Netherlands) Isabelle Haverlag (quarterfinals)

== Draw ==
Key

- Q = Qualifier
- WC = Wild card
- LL = Lucky loser
- Alt = Alternate
- ITF = ITF entry
- PR = Protected ranking
- SR = Special ranking
- SE = Special exempt
- JE = Junior exempt
- JR = Junior Accelerator Programme entrant
- CO = College Accelerator Programme entrant
- NG = Next Gen Accelerator Program entrant
- w/o = Walkover
- r = Retired
- d = Defaulted

=== Draw ===
Quarterfinals
1	(France) E Cascino (Slovenia) N Radišić	7	4	[9]
(Japan) M Kobori (Japan) A Shimizu	5	6	[11]
(Poland) M Kubka (Poland) A Rosolska	7^{7}	6
(Spain) Y Cavallé Reimers (Germany) N Noha Akugue	6^{5}	0
WC	(Poland) W Ewald (Poland) D Górska	4	1
(Switzerland) N Karamoko (Belgium) L Salden	6	6
(Poland) W Falkowska (United States) A Smith	6	4	[10]
2	(United Kingdom) M Brooks (Netherlands) I Haverlag	2	6	[6]

Semifinals
(Japan) M Kobori (Japan) A Shimizu	4	7	[7]
(Poland) M Kubka (Poland) A Rosolska	6	5	[10]
(Switzerland) N Karamoko (Belgium) L Salden	1	2
(Poland) W Falkowska (United States) A Smith	6	6

Final
(Poland) M Kubka (Poland) A Rosolska	3	1
(Poland) W Falkowska (United States) A Smith	6	6
