= 2026 Mazovia Open =

- Date: 3–9 August
- Edition: 5th
- Surface: Hard
- Location: Grodzisk Mazowiecki, Poland

Champions

Singles
- (Austria) Joel Schwärzler

Doubles
- (Morocco) Younes Lalami / (Poland) Filip Pieczonka
- Mazovia Open

The 2026 Mazovia Open was a professional tennis tournament played on hard courts. It was the fifth edition of the tournament which was part of the 2026 ATP Challenger Tour. It took place in Grodzisk Mazowiecki, Poland between 3 and 9 August 2026.

== Singles main-draw entrants ==
=== Seeds ===
Country	Player	Rank^{1}	Seed
BIH	Damir Džumhur	102	1
EST	Daniil Glinka	169	2
AUT	Joel Schwärzler	183	3
ITA	Andrea Guerrieri	215	4
ESP	Alejandro Moro Cañas	221	5
POL	Maks Kaśnikowski	233	6
FRA	Harold Mayot	255	7
ITA	Michele Ribecai	267	8

- ^{1} Rankings were as of 27 July 2026.

=== Other entrants ===
The following players received wildcards into the singles main draw:

- (Poland) Tomasz Berkieta
- (Poland) Olaf Pieczkowski
- (Poland) Filip Pieczonka

The following player received entry into the singles main draw using a protected ranking:

- (Bulgaria) Iliyan Radulov

The following players received entry from the qualifying draw:

- (Czech Republic) Jiří Čížek
- (Bulgaria) Alexander Donski
- (Tunisia) Aziz Dougaz
- Ilya Ivashka
- (Turkey) Ergi Kırkın
- (Israel) Amit Vales

The following player received entry as a lucky loser:

- (Bosnia and Herzegovina) Mirza Bašić

== Champions ==
=== Singles ===
- (Austria) Joel Schwärzler def. (Italy) Andrea Guerrieri 7–6^{(7–4)}, 6–1.

=== Doubles ===
- (Morocco) Younes Lalami / (Poland) Filip Pieczonka def. (Spain) Íñigo Cervantes / (Ukraine) Denys Molchanov 6–0, 6–4.
