= 2026 Mazovia Open – Singles =

Singles
- 2026 Mazovia Open

Final
- Champion: (Austria) Joel Schwärzler
- Runner-up: (Italy) Andrea Guerrieri
- Score: 7–6^{(7–4)}, 6–1

Events
Singles	Doubles
- Mazovia Open

Kamil Majchrzak was the defending champion but chose not to defend his title.

Joel Schwärzler won the title after defeating Andrea Guerrieri 7–6^{(7–4)}, 6–1 in the final.

== Seeds ==
1. (Bosnia and Herzegovina) Damir Džumhur (second round)
2. (Estonia) Daniil Glinka (semifinals)
3. (Austria) Joel Schwärzler (champion)
4. (Italy) Andrea Guerrieri (final)
5. (Spain) Alejandro Moro Cañas (second round)
6. (Poland) Maks Kaśnikowski (second round)
7. (France) Harold Mayot (second round, withdrew)
8. (Italy) Michele Ribecai (quarterfinals)

== Draw ==
Key

- Q = Qualifier
- WC = Wild card
- LL = Lucky loser
- Alt = Alternate
- ITF = ITF entry
- PR = Protected ranking
- SR = Special ranking
- SE = Special exempt
- JE = Junior exempt
- JR = Junior Accelerator Programme entrant
- CO = College Accelerator Programme entrant
- NG = Next Gen Accelerator Program entrant
- w/o = Walkover
- r = Retired
- d = Defaulted

=== Finals ===
Semifinals
(France) Mathys Erhard	6	6^{5}	4
3	(Austria) Joel Schwärzler	3	7^{7}	6
4	(Italy) Andrea Guerrieri	0	6	6
2	(Estonia) Daniil Glinka	6	3	4

Final
3	(Austria) Joel Schwärzler	7^{7}	6
4	(Italy) Andrea Guerrieri	6^{4}	1

=== Top half ===
First round
1	(Bosnia and Herzegovina) D Džumhur	6	6
(France) G Blancaneaux	2	4
(France) Mathys Erhard	5	7	6
WC	(Poland) Olaf Pieczkowski	7	5	1
(Poland) F Peliwo	1	6	3
(Spain) Iván Marrero Curbelo	6	3	6
(South Africa) P Henning	3	4
6	(Poland) M Kaśnikowski	6	6
3	(Austria) J Schwärzler	6	6
Q	(Czech Republic) Jiří Čížek	3	1
Q	(Tunisia) A Dougaz	6	6
LL	(Bosnia and Herzegovina) M Bašić	1	4
Q	(Turkey) E Kırkın	1	7	3
Q	I Ivashka	6	5	6
WC	(Poland) F Pieczonka	2	2
7	(France) H Mayot	6	6

Second round
1	(Bosnia and Herzegovina) D Džumhur	3	6^{4}
(France) M Erhard	6	7^{7}
(Spain) I Marrero Curbelo	2	7^{7}	6
6	(Poland) M Kaśnikowski	6	6^{4}	1
3	(Austria) J Schwärzler	7^{7}	3	7^{7}
Q	(Tunisia) A Dougaz	6^{2}	6	6^{4}
Q	I Ivashka	w/o
7	(France) H Mayot

Quarterfinals
(France) M Erhard	6	6
(Spain) I Marrero Curbelo	3	3
3	(Austria) J Schwärzler	7^{7}	6
Q	I Ivashka	6^{4}	4

Semifinals
(France) M Erhard	6	6^{5}	4
3	(Austria) J Schwärzler	3	7^{7}	6

=== Bottom half ===
First round
8	(Italy) M Ribecai	6	6
PR	(Bulgaria) I Radulov	2	1
WC	(Poland) T Berkieta	6	7^{7}
(Argentina) F Mena	3	6^{1}
(Norway) V Durasovic	6^{9}	6	6
(Belgium) M Geerts	7^{11}	2	2
(Sweden) O Wallin	1	4
4	(Italy) A Guerrieri	6	6
5	(Spain) A Moro Cañas	7	6
(France) R Bertrand	5	4
Q	(Bulgaria) A Donski	7	6
(Japan) Takuya Kumasaka	5	4
(Spain) Àlex Martínez	2	0
Q	(Israel) Amit Vales	6	6
(Egypt) Fares Zakaria	4	6	1
2	(Estonia) D Glinka	6	3	6

Second round
8	(Italy) M Ribecai	7	6
WC	(Poland) T Berkieta	5	4
(Norway) V Durasovic	4	6	2
4	(Italy) A Guerrieri	6	4	6
5	(Spain) A Moro Cañas	4	6^{5}
Q	(Bulgaria) A Donski	6	7^{7}
Q	(Israel) A Vales	5	6	4
2	(Estonia) D Glinka	7	1	6

Quarterfinals
8	(Italy) M Ribecai	6	5	2
4	(Italy) A Guerrieri	4	7	6
Q	(Bulgaria) A Donski	6^{4}	4
2	(Estonia) D Glinka	7^{7}	6

Semifinals
4	(Italy) A Guerrieri	0	6	6
2	(Estonia) D Glinka	6	3	4
