= 2026 Mazovia Open – Doubles =

Doubles
- 2026 Mazovia Open

Final
- Champions: (Morocco) Younes Lalami (Poland) Filip Pieczonka
- Runners-up: (Spain) Íñigo Cervantes (Ukraine) Denys Molchanov
- Score: 6–0, 6–4

Events
Singles	Doubles
- Mazovia Open

Thijmen Loof and Arthur Reymond were the defending champions but chose not to defend their title.

Younes Lalami and Filip Pieczonka won the title after defeating Íñigo Cervantes and Denys Molchanov 6–0, 6–4 in the final.

== Seeds ==
1. (India) Siddhant Banthia / (Bulgaria) Alexander Donski (semifinals)
2. (Poland) Szymon Kielan / (Poland) Piotr Matuszewski (quarterfinals)
3. (Romania) Victor Vlad Cornea / (Israel) Daniel Cukierman (semifinals)
4. (Spain) Íñigo Cervantes / (Ukraine) Denys Molchanov (final)

== Draw ==
Key

- Q = Qualifier
- WC = Wild card
- LL = Lucky loser
- Alt = Alternate
- ITF = ITF entry
- PR = Protected ranking
- SR = Special ranking
- SE = Special exempt
- JE = Junior exempt
- JR = Junior Accelerator Programme entrant
- CO = College Accelerator Programme entrant
- NG = Next Gen Accelerator Program entrant
- w/o = Walkover
- r = Retired
- d = Defaulted

First round
1	(India) S Banthia (Bulgaria) A Donski	6	6
(Belgium) M Geerts (Venezuela) B Pérez	2	4
(India) SDP Dev (India) Nitin Kumar Sinha	6	6
WC	(Poland) Alan Bojarski (Poland) Adam Majchrzak	1	3
4	(Spain) Í Cervantes (Ukraine) D Molchanov	5	6	[10]
WC	(Poland) T Berkieta (Poland) Olaf Pieczkowski	7	3	[3]
(United Kingdom) S Duncan (United Kingdom) M Whitehouse	2	4
(Bosnia and Herzegovina) M Bašić (Bosnia and Herzegovina) D Džumhur	6	6
(France) G Blancaneaux (Norway) V Durasovic	6	7
(Venezuela) Juan José Bianchi (Spain) B Pujol Navarro	3	5
(Spain) Iván Marrero Curbelo (Spain) A Moro Cañas	4	4
3	(Romania) V Cornea (Israel) D Cukierman	6	6
(South Africa) P Henning (Greece) D Sakellaridis	7^{7}	6^{6}	[3]
(Morocco) Y Lalami (Poland) F Pieczonka	6^{5}	7^{8}	[10]
PR	(France) R Bertrand (Tunisia) A Dougaz
2	(Poland) S Kielan (Poland) P Matuszewski	w/o

Quarterfinals
1	(India) S Banthia (Bulgaria) A Donski	6^{6}	6	[14]
(India) SDP Dev (India) NK Sinha	7^{8}	2	[12]
4	(Spain) Í Cervantes (Ukraine) D Molchanov	w/o
(Bosnia and Herzegovina) M Bašić (Bosnia and Herzegovina) D Džumhur
(France) G Blancaneaux (Norway) V Durasovic	1	6^{6}
3	(Romania) V Cornea (Israel) D Cukierman	6	7^{8}
(Morocco) Y Lalami (Poland) F Pieczonka	3	6	[10]
2	(Poland) S Kielan (Poland) P Matuszewski	6	3	[5]

Semifinals
1	(India) S Banthia (Bulgaria) A Donski	4	6	[7]
4	(Spain) Í Cervantes (Ukraine) D Molchanov	6	3	[10]
3	(Romania) V Cornea (Israel) D Cukierman	6	3	[8]
(Morocco) Y Lalami (Poland) F Pieczonka	3	6	[10]

Final
4	(Spain) Í Cervantes (Ukraine) D Molchanov	0	4
(Morocco) Y Lalami (Poland) F Pieczonka	6	6
