= 2025 Kozerki Open – Singles =

Singles
- 2025 Kozerki Open

Final
- Champion: (Poland) Kamil Majchrzak
- Runner-up: (Croatia) Dino Prižmić
- Score: 6–4, 6–3

Events
Singles	Doubles
- Kozerki Open

Marc-Andrea Hüsler was the defending champion but lost in the second round to Ugo Blanchet.

Kamil Majchrzak won the title after defeating Dino Prižmić 6–4, 6–3 in the final.

== Seeds ==
1. (Poland) Kamil Majchrzak (champion)
2. (Croatia) Dino Prižmić (final)
3. (France) Harold Mayot (semifinals)
4. (France) Kyrian Jacquet (first round)
5. (Switzerland) Marc-Andrea Hüsler (second round)
6. (Italy) Francesco Maestrelli (quarterfinals)
7. (France) Calvin Hemery (first round)
8. (France) Hugo Grenier (first round)

== Draw ==
Key

- Q = Qualifier
- WC = Wild card
- LL = Lucky loser
- Alt = Alternate
- ITF = ITF entry
- PR = Protected ranking
- SR = Special ranking
- SE = Special exempt
- JE = Junior exempt
- JR = Junior Accelerator Programme entrant
- CO = College Accelerator Programme entrant
- NG = Next Gen Accelerator Program entrant
- w/o = Walkover
- r = Retired
- d = Defaulted

=== Finals ===
Semifinals
1	(Poland) Kamil Majchrzak	6	6
(France) Ugo Blanchet	3	2
3	(France) Harold Mayot	4	3
2	(Croatia) Dino Prižmić	6	6

Final
1	(Poland) Kamil Majchrzak	6	6
2	(Croatia) Dino Prižmić	4	3

=== Top half ===
First round
1	(Poland) K Majchrzak	3	6	7
PR	I Ivashka	6	0	5
WC	(Poland) T Berkieta	7^{7}	7^{7}
(Chile) M Soto	6^{5}	6^{5}
Q	(Estonia) D Glinka	6	6
Q	(Moldova) R Albot	3	4
WC	(Poland) M Kaśnikowski	4	7^{7}	6
8	(France) H Grenier	6	6^{5}	1
4	(France) K Jacquet	2	1
(Italy) F Cinà	6	6
Q	(Poland) F Pieczonka	7^{7}	2	5
A Karatsev	6^{4}	6	7
Q	(Jordan) A Shelbayh	3	1
(France) U Blanchet	6	6
Q	(Spain) R Jódar	6^{1}	4
5	(Switzerland) M-A Hüsler	7^{7}	6

Second round
1	(Poland) K Majchrzak	6	6
WC	(Poland) T Berkieta	3	2
Q	(Estonia) D Glinka	7^{9}	6
WC	(Poland) M Kaśnikowski	6^{7}	4
(Italy) F Cinà	6	6
A Karatsev	0	3
(France) U Blanchet	6	6
5	(Switzerland) M-A Hüsler	3	3

Quarterfinals
1	(Poland) K Majchrzak	6	3	6
Q	(Estonia) D Glinka	4	6	4
(Italy) F Cinà	5	4
(France) U Blanchet	7	6

Semifinals
1	(Poland) K Majchrzak	6	6
(France) U Blanchet	3	2

=== Bottom half ===
First round
7	(France) C Hemery	2	3
NG	(Czech Republic) Petr Brunclík	6	6
(United Kingdom) J Monday	3	4
Alt	(Italy) G Zeppieri	6	6
SE	(Italy) A Binda	6^{6}	3
Alt	(China) J Cui	7^{8}	6
(France) C Chidekh	4	6^{4}
3	(France) H Mayot	6	7^{7}
6	(Italy) F Maestrelli	6	6
Q	(Thailand) M Jones	4	4
(Germany) J Engel	6^{5}	6	6
(Spain) A Moro Cañas	7^{7}	4	4
(Norway) V Durasovic	3	4
WC	(Poland) Olaf Pieczkowski	6	6
(Belgium) G Onclin	2	4
2	(Croatia) D Prižmić	6	6

Second round
NG	(Czech Republic) P Brunclík	6^{6}	7^{7}	2
Alt	(Italy) G Zeppieri	7^{8}	6^{5}	6
Alt	(China) J Cui	4	4
3	(France) H Mayot	6	6
6	(Italy) F Maestrelli	6	7^{7}
(Germany) J Engel	4	6^{2}
WC	(Poland) O Pieczkowski	4	2
2	(Croatia) D Prižmić	6	6

Quarterfinals
Alt	(Italy) G Zeppieri	3	2
3	(France) H Mayot	6	6
6	(Italy) F Maestrelli	3	4
2	(Croatia) D Prižmić	6	6

Semifinals
3	(France) H Mayot	4	3
2	(Croatia) D Prižmić	6	6
