= 2025 Kozerki Open – Doubles =

Doubles
- 2025 Kozerki Open

Final
- Champions: (Netherlands) Thijmen Loof (France) Arthur Reymond
- Runners-up: (South Korea) Nam Ji-sung (Japan) Takeru Yuzuki
- Score: 6–4, 6–7^{(3–7)}, [16–14]

Events
Singles	Doubles
- Kozerki Open

Charles Broom and David Stevenson were the defending champions but only Stevenson chose to defend his title, partnering Matěj Vocel. They lost in the first round to Thijmen Loof and Arthur Reymond.

Loof and Reymond won the title after defeating Nam Ji-sung and Takeru Yuzuki 6–4, 6–7^{(3–7)}, [16–14] in the final.

== Seeds ==
1. (Poland) Piotr Matuszewski / (Chile) Matías Soto (first round)
2. (United Kingdom) Joshua Paris / (United Kingdom) Marcus Willis (semifinals)
3. (United Kingdom) David Stevenson / (Czech Republic) Matěj Vocel (first round)
4. (South Korea) Nam Ji-sung / (Japan) Takeru Yuzuki (final)

== Draw ==
Key

- Q = Qualifier
- WC = Wild card
- LL = Lucky loser
- Alt = Alternate
- ITF = ITF entry
- PR = Protected ranking
- SR = Special ranking
- SE = Special exempt
- JE = Junior exempt
- JR = Junior Accelerator Programme entrant
- CO = College Accelerator Programme entrant
- NG = Next Gen Accelerator Program entrant
- w/o = Walkover
- r = Retired
- d = Defaulted

=== Draw ===
First round
1	(Poland) P Matuszewski (Chile) M Soto	3	6^{3}
(Sweden) E Grevelius (Serbia) S Latinović	6	7^{7}
(India) SDP Dev (India) Nitin Kumar Sinha	2	7^{7}	[12]
WC	(Poland) T Berkieta (Poland) Mateusz Lange	6	6^{3}	[10]
3	(United Kingdom) D Stevenson (Czech Republic) M Vocel	4	5
(Netherlands) T Loof (France) A Reymond	6	7
(Czech Republic) J Jermář (India) Parikshit Somani	3	6^{2}
(Czech Republic) D Poljak (China) A Wang	6	7^{7}
(France) H Grenier (France) C Hemery	4	2
(France) U Blanchet (France) K Jacquet	6	6
(Jordan) A Shelbayh (Poland) S Walków	3	1
4	(South Korea) J-s Nam (Japan) T Yuzuki	6	6
WC	(Poland) Adam Majchrzak (Poland) K Majchrzak	1	2
(Poland) S Kielan (Poland) F Pieczonka	6	6
(Moldova) R Albot (China) J Cui	4	1
2	(United Kingdom) J Paris (United Kingdom) M Willis	6	6

Quarterfinals
(Sweden) E Grevelius (Serbia) S Latinović	3	5
(India) SDP Dev (India) NK Sinha	6	7
(Netherlands) T Loof (France) A Reymond	6	6
(Czech Republic) D Poljak (China) A Wang	1	4
(France) U Blanchet (France) K Jacquet	2	4
4	(South Korea) J-s Nam (Japan) T Yuzuki	6	6
(Poland) S Kielan (Poland) F Pieczonka	6^{4}	2
2	(United Kingdom) J Paris (United Kingdom) M Willis	7^{7}	6

Semifinals
(India) SDP Dev (India) NK Sinha	2	7	[7]
(Netherlands) T Loof (France) A Reymond	6	5	[10]
4	(South Korea) J-s Nam (Japan) T Yuzuki	6	5	[10]
2	(United Kingdom) J Paris (United Kingdom) M Willis	4	7	[8]

Final
(Netherlands) T Loof (France) A Reymond	6	6^{3}	[16]
4	(South Korea) J-s Nam (Japan) T Yuzuki	4	7^{7}	[14]
