= 2026 Open Araba en Femenino – Singles =

Singles
- 2026 Open Araba en Femenino

Final
- Champion: (Poland) Martyna Kubka
- Runner-up: (Lithuania) Justina Mikulskytė
- Score: 5–7, 6–3, 6–3

Events
Singles	Doubles
- Open Araba en Femenino

Linda Klimovičová was the defending champion, but did not participate.

Martyna Kubka won the title, defeating Justina Mikulskytė 5–7, 6–3, 6–3 in the final.

== Seeds ==
1. (Poland) Martyna Kubka (champion)
2. (Lithuania) Justina Mikulskytė (final)
3. (United States) Hina Inoue (second round)
4. (Slovakia) Katarína Kužmová (quarterfinals)
5. (Switzerland) Valentina Ryser (first round)
6. (China) Shi Han (quarterfinals)
7. (Netherlands) Stéphanie Visscher (second round)
8. Kira Pavlova (semifinals)

== Draw ==
Key

- Q = Qualifier
- WC = Wild card
- LL = Lucky loser
- Alt = Alternate
- ITF = ITF entry
- PR = Protected ranking
- SR = Special ranking
- SE = Special exempt
- JE = Junior exempt
- JR = Junior Accelerator Programme entrant
- CO = College Accelerator Programme entrant
- NG = Next Gen Accelerator Program entrant
- w/o = Walkover
- r = Retired
- d = Defaulted

=== Finals ===
Semifinals
1	(Poland) Martyna Kubka	6	4	6
8	Kira Pavlova	4	6	4
SR	Valeria Savinykh	4	4
2	(Lithuania) Justina Mikulskytė	6	6

Final
1	(Poland) Martyna Kubka	5	6	6
2	(Lithuania) Justina Mikulskytė	7	3	3

=== Top half ===
First round
1	(Poland) M Kubka	6	6
WC	(Spain) J Gómez	2	0
Q	(France) C Noël	7	6
Q	(Spain) M Teixidó García	5	1
Q	(China) R Zhang	4	6	6
(France) T Lemaître	6	3	2
(Germany) I Wobker	2	0
6	(China) H Shi	6	6
4	(Slovakia) K Kužmová	6	6
(Spain) A Rey García	4	3
Q	(Germany) A Kuparev	5	4
Q	(Ukraine) K Lazarenko	7	6
(Netherlands) D Tran	2	6	3
Q	(Georgia (country)) Z Kardava	6	2	6
(Spain) C Gallardo Guevara	3	2
8	K Pavlova	6	6

Second round
1	(Poland) M Kubka	6	6
Q	(France) C Noël	2	2
Q	(China) R Zhang	6	1	3
6	(China) H Shi	3	6	6
4	(Slovakia) K Kužmová	6	1
Q	(Ukraine) K Lazarenko	3	0^{r}
Q	(Georgia (country)) Z Kardava	1	6	3
8	K Pavlova	6	4	6

Quarterfinals
1	(Poland) M Kubka	4	6	7
6	(China) H Shi	6	1	5
4	(Slovakia) K Kužmová	4	4
8	K Pavlova	6	6

Semifinals
1	(Poland) M Kubka	6	4	6
8	K Pavlova	4	6	4

=== Bottom half ===
First round
7	(Netherlands) S Visscher	4	6	6
WC	(Spain) J Giaccio	6	4	1
(France) N Berecoechea	2	4
(Spain) M Martínez Vaquero	6	6
Q	(Spain) C Anson Sánchez	4	2
SR	V Savinykh	6	6
(India) V Adkar	6^{7}	7	3
3	(United States) H Inoue	7^{9}	5	6
5	(Switzerland) V Ryser	6	2	1
M Golovina	2	6	6
(Australia) M Ercan	6	6
WC	(Spain) O Bienzobas Fernández	3	2
Q	(France) L Boulard	6	3	7^{7}
(Germany) GM Dittmann	3	6	6^{5}
WC	(Spain) E Zozaya Menéndez	4	6^{4}
2	(Lithuania) J Mikulskytė	6	7^{7}

Second round
7	(Netherlands) S Visscher	4	2
(Spain) M Martínez Vaquero	6	6
SR	V Savinykh	6	1	6
3	(United States) H Inoue	4	6	4
M Golovina	6	1	6
(Australia) M Ercan	4	6	1
Q	(France) L Boulard	2	3
2	(Lithuania) J Mikulskytė	6	6

Quarterfinals
(Spain) M Martínez Vaquero	6	6^{5}	1
SR	V Savinykh	3	7^{7}	6
M Golovina	2	3
2	(Lithuania) J Mikulskytė	6	6

Semifinals
SR	V Savinykh	4	4
2	(Lithuania) J Mikulskytė	6	6
