= 2023 Kozerki Open – Singles =

Singles
- 2023 Kozerki Open

Final
- Champion: (Netherlands) Jesper de Jong
- Runner-up: (Lebanon) Benjamin Hassan
- Score: 6–3, 6–3

Events
Singles	Doubles
- Kozerki Open

Tomáš Macháč was the defending champion but lost in the second round to Denis Yevseyev.

Jesper de Jong won the title after defeating Benjamin Hassan 6–3, 6–3 in the final.

== Seeds ==
1. (Czech Republic) Tomáš Macháč (second round)
2. (Belgium) Joris De Loore (first round)
3. (Czech Republic) Zdeněk Kolář (withdrew)
4. (Australia) Marc Polmans (second round)
5. (Netherlands) Jesper de Jong (champion)
6. (Sweden) Elias Ymer (semifinals)
7. (Netherlands) Jelle Sels (first round)
8. (Portugal) Frederico Ferreira Silva (first round)

== Draw ==
Key

- Q = Qualifier
- WC = Wild card
- LL = Lucky loser
- Alt = Alternate
- ITF = ITF entry
- PR = Protected ranking
- SR = Special ranking
- SE = Special exempt
- JE = Junior exempt
- JR = Junior Accelerator Programme entrant
- CO = College Accelerator Programme entrant
- NG = Next Gen Accelerator Program entrant
- w/o = Walkover
- r = Retired
- d = Defaulted

=== Finals ===
Semifinals
Q	(Kazakhstan) Denis Yevseyev	4	4
(Lebanon) Benjamin Hassan	6	6
5	(Netherlands) Jesper de Jong	7^{9}	6
6	(Sweden) Elias Ymer	6^{7}	1

Final
(Lebanon) Benjamin Hassan	3	3
5	(Netherlands) Jesper de Jong	6	6

=== Top half ===
First round
1	(Czech Republic) T Macháč	6	6
(Poland) F Peliwo	1	1
WC	(Poland) T Berkieta	3	1
Q	(Kazakhstan) D Yevseyev	6	6
(France) M Janvier	7^{7}	6
(Switzerland) A Bellier	6^{1}	3
(Tunisia) S Mansouri	7^{7}	6
8	(Portugal) F Ferreira Silva	6^{4}	3
4	(Australia) M Polmans	6	6
Q	(Colombia) A Soriano Barrera	3	4
Q	(Romania) M Copil	6	1	6
(North Macedonia) K Ivanovski	4	6	4
(Lebanon) B Hassan	6	6
WC	(Poland) Martyn Pawelski	2	0
Q	(Czech Republic) J Veselý	6	7
7	(Netherlands) J Sels	4	5

Second round
1	(Czech Republic) T Macháč	5	6^{5}
Q	(Kazakhstan) D Yevseyev	7	7^{7}
(France) M Janvier	6	5	6
(Tunisia) S Mansouri	1	7	2
4	(Australia) M Polmans	2	2
Q	(Romania) M Copil	6	6
(Lebanon) B Hassan	4	7^{7}	7^{7}
Q	(Czech Republic) J Veselý	6	6^{5}	6^{5}

Quarterfinals
Q	(Kazakhstan) D Yevseyev	6	3	7^{7}
(France) M Janvier	3	6	6^{5}
Q	(Romania) M Copil	5	1
(Lebanon) B Hassan	7	6

Semifinals
Q	(Kazakhstan) D Yevseyev	4	4
(Lebanon) B Hassan	6	6

=== Bottom half ===
First round
5	(Netherlands) J de Jong	6	4
(Argentina) S Rodríguez Taverna	3	3^{r}
(Lithuania) R Berankis	1	6	2
Alt	(United Kingdom) C Broom	6	3	6
WC	(United States) Dali Blanch	2	1
Alt	(Germany) P Gojowczyk	6	6
(Poland) M Kaśnikowski	6	6
LL	(Greece) S Sakellaridis	2	0
6	(Sweden) E Ymer	6	6
Q	(Czech Republic) D Poljak	4	3
(Italy) S Napolitano	6	4	6^{2}
(France) Jules Marie	3	6	7^{7}
Q	(Australia) A Santillan	3	2
(Poland) K Żuk	6	6
Alt	(Norway) V Durasovic	1	7^{8}	7^{7}
2	(Belgium) J De Loore	6	6^{6}	6^{4}

Second round
5	(Netherlands) J de Jong	6	6
Alt	(United Kingdom) C Broom	4	4
Alt	(Germany) P Gojowczyk	3	4
(Poland) M Kaśnikowski	6	6
6	(Sweden) E Ymer	4	6	6
(France) J Marie	6	3	4
(Poland) K Żuk	6	3	7
Alt	(Norway) V Durasovic	4	6	5

Quarterfinals
5	(Netherlands) J de Jong	6	6
(Poland) M Kaśnikowski	0	2
6	(Sweden) E Ymer	6	6
(Poland) K Żuk	3	4

Semifinals
5	(Netherlands) J de Jong	7^{9}	6
6	(Sweden) E Ymer	6^{7}	1
