= 2023 Kozerki Open – Doubles =

Doubles
- 2023 Kozerki Open

Final
- Champions: (France) Théo Arribagé (France) Luca Sanchez
- Runners-up: (India) Anirudh Chandrasekar (India) Vijay Sundar Prashanth
- Score: 6–4, 6–4

Events
Singles	Doubles
- Kozerki Open

Robin Haase and Philipp Oswald were the defending champions but chose not to defend their title.

Théo Arribagé and Luca Sanchez won the title after defeating Anirudh Chandrasekar and Vijay Sundar Prashanth 6–4, 6–4 in the final.

== Seeds ==
1. (Uruguay) Ariel Behar / (Czech Republic) Adam Pavlásek (quarterfinals)
2. (Netherlands) Sander Arends / (Netherlands) David Pel (first round)
3. (France) Théo Arribagé / (France) Luca Sanchez (champions)
4. (India) Anirudh Chandrasekar / (India) Vijay Sundar Prashanth (final)

== Draw ==
Key

- Q = Qualifier
- WC = Wild card
- LL = Lucky loser
- Alt = Alternate
- ITF = ITF entry
- PR = Protected ranking
- SR = Special ranking
- SE = Special exempt
- JE = Junior exempt
- JR = Junior Accelerator Programme entrant
- CO = College Accelerator Programme entrant
- NG = Next Gen Accelerator Program entrant
- w/o = Walkover
- r = Retired
- d = Defaulted

First round
1	(Uruguay) A Behar (Czech Republic) A Pavlásek	7^{7}	6
(India) N Kaliyanda Poonacha (Australia) A Taylor	6^{4}	3
WC	(Poland) M Kaśnikowski (Poland) S Kielan	5	3
(India) D Sharan (Slovakia) I Zelenay	7	6
3	(France) T Arribagé (France) L Sanchez	6	6
(Netherlands) M Hermans (India) Parikshit Somani	3	2
(United Kingdom) C Broom (United Kingdom) M Whitehouse	6	6
WC	(Poland) Ł Kubot (Poland) K Żuk	2	1
(Australia) A Santillan (New Zealand) R Statham	6	6
(South Korea) J-s Nam (India) J Nedunchezhiyan	1	2
(Romania) M Copil (Poland) S Walków	3	4
4	(India) A Chandrasekar (India) VS Prashanth	6	6
(Norway) V Durasovic (Ukraine) V Uzhylovskyi	3	4
I Liutarevich (Ukraine) V Manafov	6	6
(United Kingdom) L Johnson (Tunisia) S Mansouri	6	6
2	(Netherlands) S Arends (Netherlands) D Pel	3	4

Quarterfinals
1	(Uruguay) A Behar (Czech Republic) A Pavlásek	6^{1}	6	[4]
(India) D Sharan (Slovakia) I Zelenay	7^{7}	3	[10]
3	(France) T Arribagé (France) L Sanchez	4	6	[10]
(United Kingdom) C Broom (United Kingdom) M Whitehouse	6	3	[8]
(Australia) A Santillan (New Zealand) R Statham	5	2
4	(India) A Chandrasekar (India) VS Prashanth	7	6
I Liutarevich (Ukraine) V Manafov	4	4
(United Kingdom) L Johnson (Tunisia) S Mansouri	6	6

Semifinals
(India) D Sharan (Slovakia) I Zelenay	5	6	[9]
3	(France) T Arribagé (France) L Sanchez	7	4	[11]
4	(India) A Chandrasekar (India) VS Prashanth	7^{7}	6
(United Kingdom) L Johnson (Tunisia) S Mansouri	6^{2}	2

Final
3	(France) T Arribagé (France) L Sanchez	6	6
4	(India) A Chandrasekar (India) VS Prashanth	4	4
