= Alana Smith (tennis) =

American tennis player (born 1999)

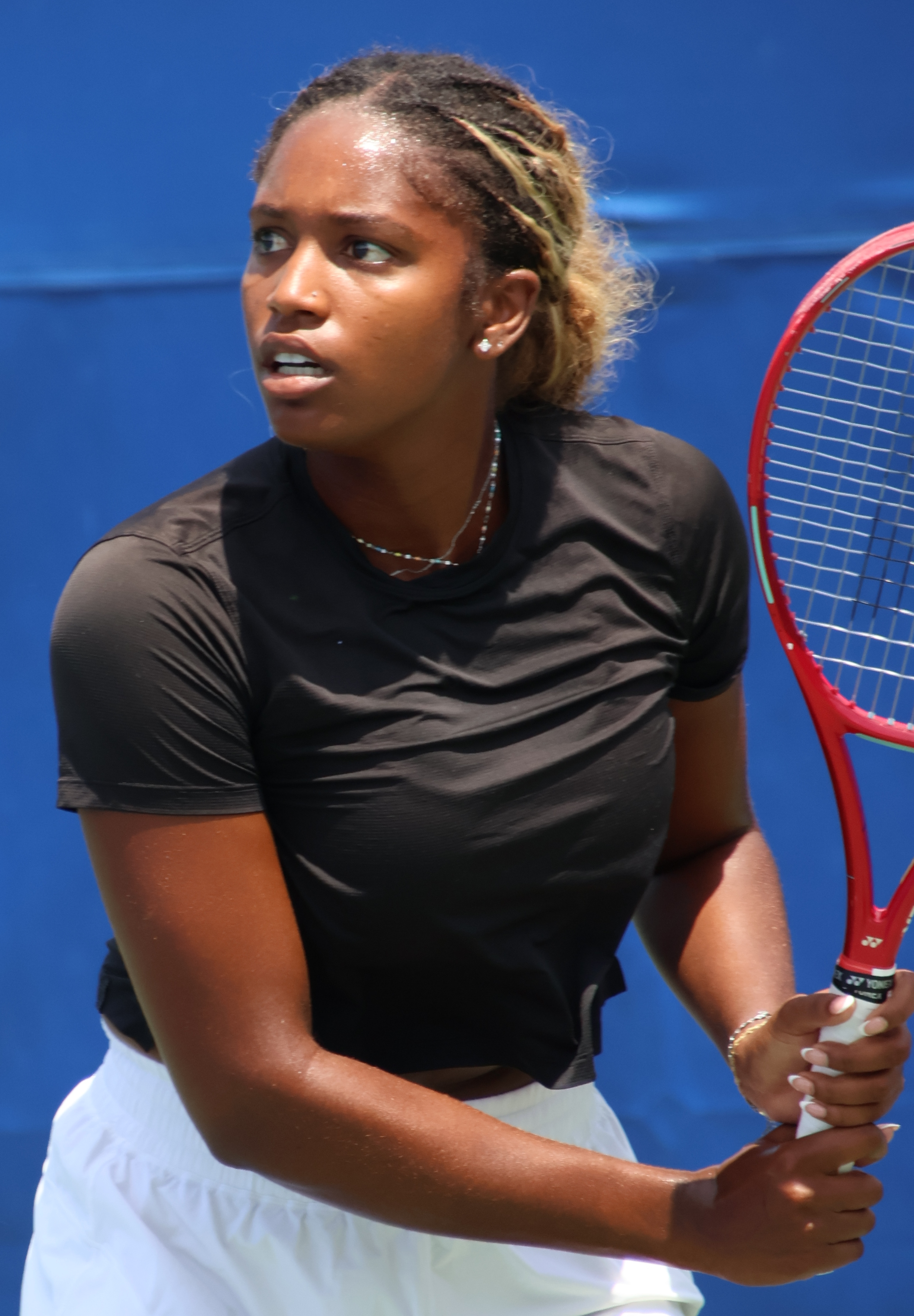
- Smith in 2026
- Country (sports): United States
- Born: November 9, 1999 (age 26)
- Height: 183 cm (6 ft 0 in)
- Plays: Right (two-handed backhand)
- College: NC State
- Prize money: $244,342

Singles
- Career record: 145–151
- Highest ranking: No. 291 (September 22, 2025)
- Current ranking: No. 469 (October 19, 2026)

Doubles
- Career record: 156–101
- Career titles: 2 WTA 125
- Highest ranking: No. 89 (October 12, 2026)
- Current ranking: No. 89 (October 12, 2026)

Grand Slam doubles results
- US Open: 1R (2024)
- Last updated on: 24 October 2026.

Alana Smith (born November 9, 1999) is an American tennis player.

She has a career-high singles ranking by the WTA of 291, reached in September 2025. Her career-high WTA doubles ranking is No. 89, achieved on 12 October 2026.

Smith made her WTA Tour main-draw debut at the 2017 Washington Open in the doubles draw, partnering Skylar Morton.

Teaming up with Weronika Falkowska, she won her first WTA 125 doubles title at the 2026 Polish Open, defeating Martyna Kubka and Alicja Rosolska in the final. The following month, they won another WTA 125 title together at the Ankara Open, against Dalila Jakupović and Naïma Karamoko in the final.

== WTA 125 finals ==
=== Doubles: 4 (2 titles, 2 runner-ups) ===
Result	W–L	Date	Tournament	Surface	Partner	Opponents	Score
Loss	0–1	Feb 2026	Midland Tennis Classic, United States	Hard (i)	(United States) Mary Stoiana	(United States) Sabrina Santamaria (China) Tang Qianhui	walkover
Win	1–1	Aug 2026	Polish Open, Poland	Hard	(Poland) Weronika Falkowska	(Poland) Martyna Kubka (Poland) Alicja Rosolska	6–3, 6–1
Loss	1–2	Sep 2026	Barranquilla Open, Colombia	Hard	(United States) Dalayna Hewitt	(United States) Rasheeda McAdoo (United States) Anna Rogers	6–7^{(3)}, 3–6
Win	2–2	Sep 2026	Ankara Open, Turkiye	Hard	(Poland) Weronika Falkowska	(Slovenia) Dalila Jakupović (Switzerland) Naïma Karamoko	6–2, 7–6^{(2)}

== ITF Circuit finals ==
=== Singles: 2 (runner-ups) ===
Legend W75 tournaments W35 tournaments	Finals by surface Hard (0–2)

Result	W–L	Date	Tournament	Tier	Surface	Opponent	Score
Loss	0–1	Oct 2024	Edmond Open, United States	W75	Hard	(United States) Mary Stoiana	5–7, 3–6
Loss	0–2	Aug 2026	ITF Aldershot, United Kingdom	W35	Hard	(Switzerland) Susan Bandecchi	5–7, 0–6

=== Doubles: 25 (15 titles, 10 runner-ups) ===
Legend W100 tournaments W80 tournaments W60/75 tournaments W50 tournaments W25/35 tournaments W15 tournaments	Finals by surface Hard (12–7) Clay (3–3)

Result	W–L	Date	Tournament	Tier	Surface	Partner	Opponents	Score
Loss	0–1	Jun 2018	ITF Victoria, Canada	W15	Hard (i)	(United States) Safiya Carrington	(United States) Brynn Boren (United States) Gail Brodsky	1–6, 2–6
Win	1–1	Jul 2021	ITF Monastir, Tunisia	W15	Hard	(United States) Dalayna Hewitt	(United Kingdom) Emilie Lindh (Switzerland) Valentina Ryser	6–4, 6–3
Win	2–1	Jul 2021	ITF Monastir, Tunisia	W15	Hard	(United States) Dalayna Hewitt	(Japan) Ayumi Koshiishi (Japan) Michika Ozeki	6–4, 6–2
Loss	2–2	Oct 2021	Tennis Classic of Macon, United States	W80	Hard	(United States) Alycia Parks	(United States) Quinn Gleason (United States) Catherine Harrison	2–6, 2–6
Win	3–2	Jun 2023	ITF Madrid, Spain	W25	Hard	(United States) Dalayna Hewitt	(China) Li Zongyu (India) Vasanti Shinde	4–6, 6–2, [10–6]
Win	4–2	Jul 2023	ITF Saskatoon, Canada	W60	Hard	(United States) Abigail Rencheli	(Canada) Stacey Fung (India) Karman Thandi	4–6, 6–4, [10–7]
Win	5–2	Sep 2023	ITF Templeton Pro, US	W60	Hard	(United States) McCartney Kessler	(United States) Jessie Aney (United States) Jaeda Daniel	7–5, 6–4
Win	6–2	Oct 2023	ITF Florence, US	W25	Hard	(United States) Abigail Rencheli	(United States) Ayana Akli (Israel) Nicole Khirin	3–6, 7–6^{(9)}, [10–6]
Loss	6–3	Oct 2023	Tyler Pro Challenge, US	W80	Hard	(United States) Anna Rogers	(United Kingdom) Amelia Rajecki (United States) Abigail Rencheli	5–7, 6–4, [14–16]
Win	7–3	Feb 2024	ITF Spring, US	W35	Hard	(United States) Whitney Osuigwe	(United States) Malkia Ngounoue (Brazil) Thaísa Grana Pedretti	6–4, 6–4
Loss	7–4	May 2024	Zephyrhills Open, US	W75	Clay	(United States) Anna Rogers	(Lithuania) Justina Mikulskytė (United States) Christina Rosca	4–6, 4–6
Win	8–4	Jul 2024	ITF Getxo, Spain	W35	Clay (i)	(United States) Anna Rogers	(Greece) Martha Matoula (Australia) Seone Mendez	6–0, 7–6^{(7)}
Win	9–4	Jul 2024	Lexington Open, US	W75	Hard	(United States) Whitney Osuigwe	(United States) Carmen Corley (United States) Ivana Corley	7–6^{(5)}, 6–3
Win	10–4	Sep 2024	ITF San Rafael, US	W35	Hard	(United States) Robin Anderson	(United States) Makenna Jones (United States) Jamie Loeb	7–5, 6–2
Loss	10–5	Nov 2024	ITF Austin, US	W50	Hard	(United States) Whitney Osuigwe	(Morocco) Diae El Jardi (Brazil) Thaísa Grana Pedretti	2–6, 6–4, [12–14]
Win	11–5	Dec 2024	ITF Tampa, US	W50	Clay	(United States) Makenna Jones	(United States) Lexington Reed (United States) Mia Yamakita	7–5, 6–1
Win	12–5	Jan 2025	ITF Nonthaburi, Thailand	W75	Hard	(United States) Maria Mateas	(Chinese Taipei) Cho I-hsuan (Chinese Taipei) Cho Yi-tsen	6–1, 6–3
Win	13–5	Feb 2025	Arcadia Pro Open, US	W35	Hard	(United States) Victoria Osuigwe	(Indonesia) Aldila Sutjiadi (Indonesia) Janice Tjen	6–3, 6–4
Loss	13–6	Apr 2025	ITF Boca Raton, US	W35	Clay	(United States) Victoria Osuigwe	(United States) Rasheeda McAdoo (United States) Akasha Urhobo	7–5, 6–7^{(3)}, [7–10]
Loss	13–7	Apr 2025	Zephyrhills Open, US	W50	Clay	(United States) Maria Mateas	(Russia) Maria Kozyreva (Belarus) Iryna Shymanovich	4–6, 1–6
Win	14–7	May 2025	ITF Boca Raton, US	W35	Clay	(United States) Fiona Crawley	(United States) Kayla Day (United States) Allura Zamarripa	6–4, 6–2
Loss	14–8	Jul 2025	Lexington Open, US	W75	Hard	(United States) Elvina Kalieva	(United States) Ayana Akli (United States) Eryn Cayetano	6–4, 2–6, [4–10]
Loss	14–9	Nov 2025	ITF Austin, US	W50	Hard	(United States) Victoria Osuigwe	(United States) Savannah Broadus (Kazakhstan) Sonja Zhiyenbayeva	3–6, 3–6
Win	15–9	Jan 2026	San Diego Open, US	W100	Hard	(Canada) Kayla Cross	(United States) Catherine Harrison (United States) Dalayna Hewitt	6–2, 6–3
Loss	15–10	Mar 2026	ITF Murska Sobota, Slovenia	W75	Hard (i)	(United States) Rasheeda McAdoo	(Czech Republic) Lucie Havlíčková (Czech Republic) Laura Samson	walkover
