= Ania Hertel =

Polish tennis player

Anna Hertel
- Country (sports): Poland
- Born: 27 October 2000 (age 26) Warsaw, Poland
- College: Georgia
- Prize money: $68,126

Singles
- Career record: 156–157
- Career titles: 2 ITF
- Highest ranking: No. 495 (20 October 2025)

Doubles
- Career record: 95–59
- Career titles: 7 ITF
- Highest ranking: No. 285 (2 August 2021)
- Current ranking: No. 908 (16 November 2026)
- Last updated on: 22 November 2026.

Ania Hertel (born 27 October 2000) is a Polish tennis player. She has a career-high WTA singles ranking of world No. 495, achieved on 20 October 2025 and a doubles ranking of No. 285, achieved on 2 August 2021.

She played college tennis at the University of Georgia.

== Career ==
Hertel made her WTA Tour main-draw debut at the 2021 WTA Poland Open in the doubles competition with Martyna Kubka.

== ITF Circuit finals ==
=== Singles: 6 (2 titles, 4 runner-ups) ===
| Legend W15 tournaments | Finals by surface Clay (2–4) |

| Result | W–L | Date | Tournament | Tier | Surface | Opponent | Score |
|---|---|---|---|---|---|---|---|
| Loss | 0–1 | Nov 2018 | ITF Heraklion, Greece | W15 | Clay | (Croatia) Oleksandra Oliynykova | 6–7^{(3)}, 6–7^{(4)} |
| Loss | 0–2 | Jun 2022 | ITF Čatež ob Savi, Slovenia | W15 | Clay | (United States) Vivian Wolff | 2–6, 7–6^{(0)}, 4–6 |
| Win | 1–2 | May 2025 | ITF Kotka, Finland | W15 | Clay | (Poland) Nadia Kulbiej | 6–2, 6–3 |
| Loss | 1–3 | Jul 2025 | ITF Grodzisk Mazowiecki, Poland | W15 | Clay | (Poland) Barbara Kostecka | 7–5, 5–7, 4–6 |
| Loss | 1–4 | Jul 2025 | ITF Savitaipale, Finland | W15 | Clay | (Poland) Marcelina Podlińska | 3–6, 4–6 |
| Win | 2–4 | Sep 2025 | ITF Nogent-sur-Marne, France | W15 | Clay | (France) Lucie Nguyen Tan | 5–7, 6–2, 6–4 |

=== Doubles: 12 (7 titles, 5 runner-ups) ===
| Legend W25 tournaments W15 tournaments | Finals by surface Hard (1–2) Clay (6–3) |

| Result | W–L | Date | Tournament | Tier | Surface | Partner | Opponents | Score |
|---|---|---|---|---|---|---|---|---|
| Win | 1–0 | Sep 2018 | ITF Shymkent, Kazakhstan | W15 | Clay | (Russia) Kamilla Rakhimova | (Russia) Ulyana Ayzatulina (Russia) Anna Iakovleva | 6–0, 7–6^{(0)} |
| Loss | 1–1 | Nov 2018 | ITF Heraklion, Greece | W15 | Clay | (Switzerland) Xenia Knoll | (Romania) Oana Gavrilă (Israel) Maya Tahan | 3–6, 6–1, [3–10] |
| Win | 2–1 | Feb 2019 | ITF Palmanova, Spain | W15 | Clay | (Chinese Taipei) Joanna Garland | (Venezuela) Luniuska Delgado (Russia) Daniella Medvedeva | 7–5, 6–0 |
| Win | 3–1 | Aug 2019 | Kozerki Open, Poland | W25 | Clay | (Ukraine) Anastasiya Shoshyna | (Norway) Ulrikke Eikeri (Bulgaria) Isabella Shinikova | 6–7^{(6)}, 6–2, [10–4] |
| Loss | 3–2 | Sep 2019 | ITF Brno, Czech Republic | W25 | Clay | (Slovakia) Vivien Juhászová | (Ukraine) Maryna Chernyshova (Slovakia) Chantal Škamlová | 7–6^{(4)}, 4–6, [4–10] |
| Loss | 3–3 | Nov 2019 | ITF Malibu, United States | W25 | Hard | (United States) Lorraine Guillermo | (Hungary) Dalma Gálfi (Belgium) Kimberley Zimmermann | 6–7^{(5)}, 3–6 |
| Loss | 3–4 | Dec 2019 | ITF Monastir, Tunisia | W15 | Hard | (Switzerland) Marie Mettraux | (Serbia) Tamara Čurović (Russia) Mariia Tkacheva | 3–6, 6–0, [8–10] |
| Win | 4–4 | Jul 2021 | ITF Wrocław, Poland | W25 | Clay | (Poland) Martyna Kubka | (Italy) Nuria Brancaccio (Turkey) İpek Öz | 6–7^{(2)}, 6–3, [10–7] |
| Finalist (Note: The match was not played due to poor weather.) | –NP- | Nov 2023 | ITF Santo Domingo, Dominican Republic | W25 | Hard | (Poland) Olivia Lincer | (Japan) Hiroko Kuwata (Brazil) Rebeca Pereira | not played |
| Win | 5–4 | Nov 2024 | ITF Alcalá de Henares, Spain | W15 | Hard | (Serbia) Katarina Jokić | (Spain) Celia Cerviño Ruiz (Spain) Claudia Ferrer Pérez | 7–6^{(3)}, 6–4 |
| Loss | 5–5 | Mar 2025 | ITF Alaminos, Cyprus | W15 | Clay | (Switzerland) Marie Mettraux | (Italy) Jessica Bertoldo (Italy) Gaia Squarcialupi | 2–6, 6–4, [7–10] |
| Win | 6–5 | Apr 2025 | ITF São Paulo, Brazil | W35 | Clay | (Bulgaria) Gergana Topalova | (Brazil) Carolina Bohrer Martins (United States) Lilian Poling | 5–7, 6–1, [10–6] |
| Win | 7–5 | May 2025 | ITF Vall de Uxó, Spain | W15 | Clay | (Hungary) Adrienn Nagy | (Italy) Enola Chiesa (France) Marine Szostak | 6–4, 6–1 |
