= Kozerki Open =

Polish Open

Tournament information
- Event name: Polish Open (WTA 2022-), Kozerki Open (ATP), Mazovia Open (2026-)
- Location: Warsaw (WTA), Grodzisk Mazowiecki (ATP), Poland
- Venue: Legia Tennis Centre (WTA), Akademia Tenisowa Tenis Kozerki (ATP)
- Surface: Hard / outdoor
- Website: mazoviaopen.pl

Current champions (2026 ATP, 2026 WTA)
- Men's singles: (Austria) Joel Schwärzler
- Women's singles: (United States) Carol Young Suh Lee
- Men's doubles: (Morocco) Younes Lalami (Poland) Filip Pieczonka
- Women's doubles: (Poland) Weronika Falkowska (United States) Alana Smith
ATP Tour
- Category: ATP Challenger Tour (2025-), Challenger 100 (2022-2024)
- Draw: 32S/24Q/16D
- Prize money: €74,825
WTA Tour
- Category: WTA 125
- Draw: 32S/8Q/8D
- Prize money: €100,000

The Polish Open (for the women's event since 2022) or the Mazovia Open (for the men's since 2026, formerly Kozerki Open) is a tournament for professional tennis players played on outdoor hardcourts since 2019. It is part of the ATP Challenger Tour (since 2022), and is a WTA 125 tournament (since 2023) on the WTA Tour. Prior to 2023, the tournament was a part of ITF Women's World Tennis Tour. It has been held annually in Grodzisk Mazowiecki, Poland, until the Women's event was moved to Warsaw, Poland in 2024.

== Past finals ==
=== Men's singles ===
Year	Champion	Runner-up	Score
2026	(Austria) Joel Schwärzler	(Italy) Andrea Guerrieri	7–6^{(7–4)}, 6–1
2025	(Poland) Kamil Majchrzak	(Croatia) Dino Prižmić	6–4, 6–3
2024	(Switzerland) Marc-Andrea Hüsler	(Czech Republic) Vít Kopřiva	6–1, 6–4
2023	(Netherlands) Jesper de Jong	(Lebanon) Benjamin Hassan	6–3, 6–3
2022	(Czech Republic) Tomáš Macháč	(China) Zhang Zhizhen	1–6, 6–3, 6–2

=== Women's singles ===
Year	Champion	Runner-up	Score
2026	(United States) Carol Young Suh Lee	(Czech Republic) Gabriela Knutson	6–4, 7–5
2025	(Czech Republic) Kateřina Siniaková (2)	(Switzerland) Viktorija Golubic	6–1, 6–2
2024	(United States) Alycia Parks	(Australia) Maya Joint	4–6, 6–3, 6–3
2023	(Ukraine) Dayana Yastremska	(Belgium) Greet Minnen	2–6, 6–1, 6–3
⬆️ WTA 125 event ⬆️
2022	(Czech Republic) Kateřina Siniaková	(Poland) Magda Linette	6–4, 6–1
2021	(Georgia (country)) Ekaterine Gorgodze	(France) Chloé Paquet	7–6^{(9–7)}, 0–6, 6–4
2020	Tournament cancelled due to the COVID-19 pandemic		
2019	(Poland) Maja Chwalińska	(Serbia) Dejana Radanović	7–6^{(7–5)}, 6–4

=== Men's doubles ===
Year	Champions	Runners-up	Score
2026	(Morocco) Younes Lalami (Poland) Filip Pieczonka	(Spain) Íñigo Cervantes (Ukraine) Denys Molchanov	6–0, 6–4
2025	(Netherlands) Thijmen Loof (France) Arthur Reymond	(South Korea) Nam Ji-sung (Japan) Takeru Yuzuki	6–4, 6–7^{(3–7)}, [16–14]
2024	(United Kingdom) Charles Broom (United Kingdom) David Stevenson	(Israel) Daniel Cukierman (Denmark) Johannes Ingildsen	6–3, 7–6^{(7–3)}
2023	(France) Théo Arribagé (France) Luca Sanchez	(India) Anirudh Chandrasekar (India) Vijay Sundar Prashanth	6–4, 6–4
2022	(Netherlands) Robin Haase (Austria) Philipp Oswald	(Monaco) Hugo Nys (France) Fabien Reboul	6–3, 6–4

=== Women's doubles ===
Year	Champions	Runners-up	Score
2026	(Poland) Weronika Falkowska (3) (United States) Alana Smith	(Poland) Martyna Kubka (Poland) Alicja Rosolska	6–3, 6–1
2025	(Poland) Weronika Falkowska (2) (Czech Republic) Dominika Šalková	(Netherlands) Isabelle Haverlag (Poland) Martyna Kubka	6–2, 6–1
2024	(Poland) Weronika Falkowska (Poland) Martyna Kubka	(Switzerland) Céline Naef (Serbia) Nina Stojanović	6–4, 7–6^{(7–5)}
2023	(Poland) Katarzyna Kawa (France) Elixane Lechemia	(United Kingdom) Naiktha Bains (United Kingdom) Maia Lumsden	6–3, 6–4
⬆️ WTA 125 event ⬆️
2022	(United Kingdom) Alicia Barnett (United Kingdom) Olivia Nicholls	(Germany) Vivian Heisen (Poland) Katarzyna Kawa	6–1, 7–6^{(7–3)}
2021	(Chile) Bárbara Gatica (Brazil) Rebeca Pereira	(South Korea) Jang Su-jeong (Chinese Taipei) Lee Ya-hsuan	6–3, 6–1
2020	Tournament cancelled due to the COVID-19 pandemic		
2019	(Poland) Ania Hertel (Ukraine) Anastasiya Shoshyna	(Norway) Ulrikke Eikeri (Bulgaria) Isabella Shinikova	6–7^{(6–8)}, 6–2, [10–4]
