= Weronika Falkowska =

Polish tennis player (born 2000)

- Country (sports): Poland
- Born: 17 June 2000 (age 26) Warsaw, Poland
- Height: 1.76 m (5 ft 9 in)
- Plays: Right (two-handed backhand)
- Prize money: $243,249

Singles
- Career record: 253–181
- Career titles: 12 ITF
- Highest ranking: No. 240 (9 January 2023)
- Current ranking: No. 294 (19 October 2026)

Doubles
- Career record: 298–123
- Career titles: 6 WTA 125, 32 ITF
- Highest ranking: No. 83 (28 August 2023)
- Current ranking: No. 118 (19 October 2026)

Team competitions
- Fed Cup: 1–2
- Last updated on: 24 October 2026.

Weronika Falkowska (born 17 June 2000) is a Polish tennis player. She has career-high WTA rankings of No. 240 in singles, reached in January 2023, and 83 in doubles, achieved on 28 August 2023.

== Career ==
Falkowska made her WTA Tour main-draw debut at the 2021 Poland Open, having received entry as a lucky loser. She was drawn against Katerina Bondarenko who had beaten her in the final qualifying round, with Falkowska prevailing in less than an hour and losing only two games.

Partnering with Cristina Bucșa, she won the doubles title 2022 at the WTA 125 Andorrà Open, defeating Angelina Gabueva and Anastasia Zakharova in the final.

Alongside Katarzyna Kawa, Falkowska took the doubles title at the WTA 125 2023 Copa Oster, overcoming Kyōka Okamura and You Xiaodi in the final which went to a deciding champions tiebreak.

Playing with Katarzyna Piter, she reached her first WTA 250 final at the WTA Poland Open, losing to Heather Watson and Yanina Wickmayer. The pair were also runners-up at the WTA 125 Veneto Open, being defeated in the final by Han Na-lae and Jang Su-jeong.

Partnered with Martyna Kubka, Falkowska won the doubles title at the WTA 125 2024 Polish Open, defeating Céline Naef and Nina Stojanović in the final.

In March 2025, Falkowska won her first doubles title of the year, and the 27th of her career, triumphing in the W35 tournament in Solarino, partnering with American player Paris Corley, in Sicily, defeating Samira de Stefano and Gaja Maduzz in straight sets in the final. She also reached the final of the singles tournament at the championship, losing to Joanna Garland of Taiwan.

== WTA Tour finals ==
=== Doubles: 1 (runner-up) ===
Legend WTA 250 (0–1)	Finals by surface Hard (0–1)

Result	Date	Tournament	Tier	Surface	Partner	Opponents	Score
Loss	Jul 2023	Poland Open, Poland	WTA 250	Hard	(Poland) Katarzyna Piter	(United Kingdom) Heather Watson (Belgium) Yanina Wickmayer	4–6, 4–6

== WTA 125 finals ==
=== Doubles: 8 (6 titles, 2 runner-ups) ===
Result	W–L	Date	Tournament	Surface	Partner	Opponents	Score
Win	1–0	Dec 2022	Andorrà Open, Andorrà	Hard (i)	(Spain) Cristina Bucșa	Angelina Gabueva; Anastasia Zakharova	7–6^{(7–4)}, 6–1
Win	2–0	Feb 2023	Cali Open, Colombia	Clay	(Poland) Katarzyna Kawa	(Japan) Kyōka Okamura (China) You Xiaodi	6–1, 5–7, [10–6]
Loss	2–1	Jun 2023	Veneto Open, Italy	Grass	(Poland) Katarzyna Piter	(South Korea) Han Na-lae (South Korea) Jang Su-jeong	3–6, 6–3, [6–10]
Win	3–1	Jul 2024	Polish Open, Poland	Hard	(Poland) Martyna Kubka	(Switzerland) Céline Naef (Serbia) Nina Stojanović	6–4, 7–6^{(7–5)}
Win	4–1	Jul 2025	Polish Open, Poland	Hard	(Czech Republic) Dominika Šalková	(Netherlands) Isabelle Haverlag (Poland) Martyna Kubka	6–2, 6–1
Loss	4–2	Oct 2025	Abierto Tampico, Mexico	Hard	(Slovenia) Kristina Novak	(Canada) Kayla Cross (United Kingdom) Amelia Rajecki	4–6, 3–6
Win	5–2	Aug 2026	Polish Open, Poland	Hard	(United States) Alana Smith	(Poland) Martyna Kubka (Poland) Alicja Rosolska	6–3, 6–1
Win	6–2	Sep 2026	Ankara Open, Turkey	Hard	(United States) Alana Smith	(Slovenia) Dalila Jakupović (Switzerland) Naïma Karamoko	6–2, 7–6^{(7–2)}

== ITF Circuit finals ==
=== Singles: 18 (12 titles, 6 runner-ups) ===
Legend W50 tournaments W25/35 tournaments (6–3) W15 tournaments (6–3)	Finals by surface Hard (7–3) Clay (5–2) Carpet (0–1)

Result	W–L	Date	Tournament	Tier	Surface	Opponent	Score
Loss	0–1	Sep 2019	Batumi Ladies Open, Georgia	W15	Hard	(Russia) Daria Kudashova	4–6, 2–6
Loss	0–2	Oct 2020	ITF Monastir, Tunisia	W15	Hard	(Argentina) María Carlé	3–6, 6–2, 1–6
Loss	0–3	Nov 2020	ITF Monastir, Tunisia	W15	Hard	(Argentina) María Carlé	4–6, 3–6
Win	1–3	Feb 2021	ITF Monastir, Tunisia	W15	Hard	(Slovakia) Viktória Morvayová	6–3, 6–3
Win	2–3	Feb 2021	ITF Monastir, Tunisia	W15	Hard	(Malta) Francesca Curmi	6–2, 6–0
Win	3–3	Mar 2021	ITF Monastir, Tunisia	W15	Hard	(Austria) Sinja Kraus	6–3, 7–6^{(1)}
Win	4–3	May 2021	ITF Tbilisi, Georgia	W15	Hard	(Russia) Valeriia Olianovskaia	6–4, 6–3
Loss	4–4	May 2022	ITF Santa Margherita die Pula, Italy	W25	Clay	(Czech Republic) Sára Bejlek	6–7^{(1)}, 1–6
Loss	4–5	May 2022	ITF Warmbad Villach, Austria	W25	Clay	(Austria) Sinja Kraus	5–7, 6–3, 4–6
Win	5–5	Aug 2022	ITF Pärnu, Estonia	W25	Clay	(Bulgaria) Gergana Topalova	7–5, 6–2
Win	6–5	Jun 2023	ITF Pörtschach, Austria	W25	Clay	(Romania) Alexandra Cadanțu-Ignatik	4–6, 6–1, 6–1
Win	7–5	Apr 2024	ITF Bujumbura, Burundi	W35	Clay	(France) Alice Tubello	6–4, 6–1
Win	8–5	Dec 2024	ITF Ortisei, Italy	W35	Hard (i)	(Italy) Silvia Ambrosio	6–4, 7–5
Loss	8–6	Mar 2025	ITF Solarino, Italy	W35	Carpet	(Chinese Taipei) Joanna Garland	1–6, 2–6
Win	9–6	Feb 2026	ITF Monastir, Tunisia	W15	Hard	(Spain) Aran Teixidó García	6–2, 7–6^{(5)}
Win	10–6	Feb 2026	ITF Monastir, Tunisia	W15	Hard	(Bulgaria) Iva Ivanova	6–3, 6–4
Win	11–6	May 2026	ITF Bol, Croatia	W35	Clay	(Croatia) Iva Primorac	6–3, 6–2
Win	12–6	Jun 2026	Amstelveen Open, Netherlands	W35	Clay	(Netherlands) Anouck Vrancken Peeters	6–2, 7–6^{(4)}

=== Doubles: 56 (32 titles, 24 runner-ups) ===
Legend W100 tournaments (1–0) W80 tournaments (0–1) W60/75 tournaments (4–6) W50 tournaments (2–2) W25/35 tournaments (15–8) W15 tournaments (10–7)	Finals by surface Hard (14–14) Clay (14–10) Carpet (2–0)

Result	W–L	Date	Tournament	Tier	Surface	Partner	Opponents	Score
Win	1–0	Oct 2018	ITF Chornomorsk, Ukraine	W15	Clay	(Ukraine) Anastasiya Shoshyna	(Belarus) Anastasiya Komar (Ukraine) Liubov Kostenko	6–2, 6–1
Win	2–0	Nov 2018	ITF Sharm El Sheikh, Egypt	W15	Hard	(Poland) Daria Kuczer	(Russia) Anastasia Pribylova (Russia) Anna Pribylova	6–3, 3–6, [10–5]
Loss	2–1	Nov 2018	ITF Sharm El Sheikh, Egypt	W15	Hard	(Poland) Daria Kuczer	(Switzerland) Jenny Dürst (Switzerland) Fiona Ganz	w/o
Loss	2–2	Aug 2019	Warsaw Open, Poland	W60	Clay	(Poland) Martyna Kubka	(Poland) Maja Chwalińska (Norway) Ulrikke Eikeri	4–6, 1–6
Loss	2–3	Sep 2019	Batumi Ladies Open, Georgia	W15	Hard	(Poland) Paulina Jastrzębska	(Sweden) Jacqueline Cabaj Awad (Turkey) Melis Sezer	6–7^{(3)}, 3–6
Win	3–3	Sep 2019	ITF Antalya, Turkey	W15	Hard	(Poland) Martyna Kubka	(Japan) Rina Saigo (Japan) Yukina Saigo	5–7, 6–4, [10–8]
Win	4–3	Oct 2019	ITF Sharm El Sheikh, Egypt	W15	Hard	(Poland) Martyna Kubka	(Romania) Elena-Teodora Cadar (Australia) Jelena Stojanovic	7–5, 6–1
Loss	4–4	Jan 2020	Liepāja Open, Latvia	W15	Hard (i)	(Poland) Martyna Kubka	(Belarus) Katyarina Paulenka (Russia) Ekaterina Shalimova	6–4, 3–6, [10–12]
Loss	4–5	Oct 2020	ITF Monastir, Tunisia	W15	Hard	(Germany) Lisa Ponomar	(Chile) Bárbara Gatica (Brazil) Rebeca Pereira	6–3, 6–7^{(3)}, [15–17]
Win	5–5	Oct 2020	ITF Monastir, Tunisia	W15	Hard	(Germany) Lisa Ponomar	(Russia) Anna Ureke (Russia) Ekaterina Vishnevskaya	6–1, 6–0
Loss	5–6	Nov 2020	ITF Monastir, Tunisia	W15	Hard	(Belarus) Anna Kubareva	(Bulgaria) Dia Evtimova (France) Carole Monnet	3–6, 6–2, [5–10]
Win	6–6	Dec 2020	ITF Monastir, Tunisia	W15	Hard	(Belarus) Yuliya Hatouka	(Spain) Yvonne Cavallé Reimers (Spain) Celia Cerviño Ruiz	6–4, 7–5
Win	7–6	Dec 2020	ITF Monastir, Tunisia	W15	Hard	(Czech Republic) Anna Sisková	(France) Aubane Droguet (France) Helena Stevic	6–2, 6–2
Win	8–6	Feb 2021	ITF Monastir, Tunisia	W15	Hard	(Czech Republic) Linda Fruhvirtová	(France) Yasmine Mansouri (Serbia) Elena Milovanović	6–3, 6–1
Win	9–6	Feb 2021	ITF Monastir, Tunisia	W15	Hard	(Slovakia) Viktória Morvayová	(Romania) Karola Bejenaru (Czech Republic) Zdena Šafářová	6–4, 7–5
Loss	9–7	Feb 2021	ITF Monastir, Tunisia	W15	Hard	(Slovakia) Viktória Morvayová	(Romania) Karola Bejenaru (Romania) Ilona Georgiana Ghioroaie	6–1, 6–7^{(7)}, [10–12]
Win	10–7	May 2021	ITF Tbilisi, Georgia	W15	Hard	(Switzerland) Jenny Dürst	(Turkey) Ayla Aksu (Russia) Valeriia Olianovskaia	6–3, 6–2
Loss	10–8	Jun 2021	ITF Heraklion, Greece	W15	Clay	(Romania) Ioana Gașpar	(Germany) Julia Kimmelmann (United Kingdom) Anna Popescu	2–6, 4–6
Loss	10–9	Jun 2021	ITF Klosters, Switzerland	W25	Clay	(Switzerland) Jenny Dürst	(Russia) Amina Anshba (Czech Republic) Anastasia Dețiuc	6–3, 1–6, [3–10]
Loss	10–10	Mar 2022	Bendigo International, Australia	W25	Hard	(Australia) Alexandra Bozovic	(India) Rutuja Bhosale (India) Ankita Raina	6–4, 3–6, [4–10]
Win	11–10	May 2022	ITF Cairo, Egypt	W25	Clay	(France) Océane Babel	(Sweden) Caijsa Hennemann; Mariia Tkacheva	6–4, 6–1
Loss	11–11	Jun 2022	Brașov Open, Romania	W60	Clay	(Slovenia) Veronika Erjavec	(Czech Republic) Jesika Malečková (Bulgaria) Isabella Shinikova	6–7, 3–6
Loss	11–12	Jun 2022	Pörtschach Trophy, Austria	W60	Clay	(Switzerland) Jenny Dürst	(United States) Jessie Aney (Czech Republic) Anna Sisková	3–6, 4–6
Loss	11–13	Jul 2022	ITF Stuttgart, Germany	W25	Clay	(Czech Republic) Anna Sisková	(Spain) Ángela Fita Boluda (Germany) Emily Seibold	4–6, 6–7^{(5)}
Loss	11–14	Aug 2022	ITF Braunschweig, Germany	W25	Clay	(Slovenia) Veronika Erjavec	(Germany) Anna Klasen (Italy) Martina Colmegna	3–6, 6–2, [5–10]
Win	12–14	Sep 2022	Collonge-Bellerive Open, Switzerland	W60	Clay	(Switzerland) Jenny Dürst	(Czech Republic) Michaela Bayerlová (Sweden) Jacqueline Cabaj Awad	7–6^{(5)}, 6–1
Loss	12–15	Sep 2022	Montreux Ladies Open, Switzerland	W60	Clay	(Switzerland) Jenny Dürst	(Algeria) Inès Ibbou (Switzerland) Naïma Karamoko	6–2, 3–6, [14–16]
Loss	12–16	Sep 2022	ITF Le Neubourg, France	W80+H	Hard	(United Kingdom) Sarah Beth Grey	(United Kingdom) Freya Christie (United Kingdom) Ali Collins	6–1, 6–7^{(4)}, [3–10]
Win	13–16	Oct 2022	ITF Šibenik, Croatia	W25	Clay	(Australia) Jaimee Fourlis	(Greece) Eleni Christofi (United States) Christina Rosca	6–4, 6–2
Win	14–16	Oct 2022	Trnava Indoor, Slovakia	W25	Hard (i)	(Croatia) Lea Bošković	(China) Lu Jiajing (Romania) Oana Georgeta Simion	7–6^{(7)}, 2–6, [10–6]
Win	15–16	Nov 2022	ITF Kiryat Motzkin, Israel	W25	Hard	Ekaterina Reyngold	(Netherlands) Jasmijn Gimbrère; Ekaterina Yashina	4–6, 6–4, [10–4]
Win	16–16	Apr 2023	ITF Santa Margherita die Pula, Italy	W25	Clay	(Greece) Valentini Grammatikopoulou	(Italy) Angelica Moratelli (Netherlands) Arantxa Rus	6–1, 6–1
Win	17–16	Jun 2023	Pörtschach Trophy, Austria	W25	Clay	(United States) Sofia Sewing	(Romania) Elena-Teodora Cadar (Latvia) Diāna Marcinkēviča	6–1, 6–2
Win	18–16	Jun 2023	Open de Biarritz, France	W60	Clay	(Poland) Katarzyna Kawa	(Switzerland) Conny Perrin (Czech Republic) Anna Sisková	7–6^{(2)}, 7–5
Win	19–16	Sep 2023	ITF Vienna, Austria	W60	Clay	(Romania) Irina Bara	(Austria) Melanie Klaffner (Austria) Sinja Kraus	6–3, 2–6, [13–11]
Loss	19–17	Feb 2024	ITF Wesley Chapel, United States	W35	Clay	(Switzerland) Leonie Küng	Maria Kononova; Maria Kozyreva	5–7, 1–6
Loss	19–18	Feb 2024	Trnava Indoor, Slovakia	W50	Hard (i)	(Hungary) Fanny Stollár	(Switzerland) Lulu Sun (Japan) Moyuka Uchijima	4–6, 6–7^{(3)}
Win	20–18	Mar 2024	ITF Solarino, Italy	W35	Carpet	(Poland) Martyna Kubka	(China) Feng Shuo (Netherlands) Stéphanie Visscher	5–7, 6–1, [11–9]
Win	21–18	Apr 2024	ITF Bujumbura, Burundi	W35	Clay	(Netherlands) Stéphanie Visscher	(Latvia) Kamilla Bartone (Burundi) Sada Nahimana	6–3, 4–6, [10–5]
Win	22–18	Oct 2024	ITF Faro, Portugal	W35	Hard	(Netherlands) Stéphanie Visscher	(Bulgaria) Lia Karatancheva (Latvia) Diāna Marcinkēviča	6–4, 2–6, [10–5]
Win	23–18	Dec 2024	ITF Ortisei, Italy	W35	Hard (i)	(Sweden) Lisa Zaar	Ekaterina Ovcharenko (United Kingdom) Emily Webley-Smith	6–4, 1–6, [12–10]
Loss	23–19	Feb 2025	ITF Leszno, Poland	W75	Hard (i)	(Poland) Martyna Kubka	(Czech Republic) Ivana Šebestová (Hong Kong) Cody Wong	4–6, 6–1, [4–10]
Loss	23–20	Feb 2025	ITF Manchester, UK	W35	Hard (i)	(Poland) Martyna Kubka	(Canada) Ariana Arseneault (United States) Anna Rogers	7–6^{(5)}, 1–6, [8–10]
Win	24–20	Mar 2025	ITF Solarino, Italy	W35	Carpet	(United States) Paris Corley	(Greece) Valentini Grammatikopoulou; Yuliya Hatouka	6–1, 6–1
Win	25–20	Sep 2025	ITF Punta Cana, Dominican Republic	W35	Clay	(Germany) Katharina Hobgarski	(Italy) Anastasia Abbagnato (Netherlands) Stéphanie Visscher	6–2, 7–5
Win	26–20	Sep 2025	ITF Punta Cana, Dominican Republic	W35	Clay	(Germany) Katharina Hobgarski	(Poland) Zuzanna Pawlikowska (Ecuador) Camila Romero	6–2, 7–5
Win	27–20	Sep 2025	ITF Kuršumlijska Banja, Serbia	W75	Clay	(Czech Republic) Anna Sisková	(Czech Republic) Michaela Bayerlová (Greece) Martha Matoula	6–0, 7–5
Win	28–20	Oct 2025	Tyler Pro Challenge, US	W100	Hard	(United States) Dalayna Hewitt	(United States) Eryn Cayetano (United States) Victoria Hu	6–2, 6–3
Win	29–20	Dec 2025	ITF Sëlva Gardena, Italy	W50	Hard (i)	(Switzerland) Céline Naef	(Italy) Laura Mair (Italy) Lisa Peer	6–4, 6–4
Loss	29–21	Jan 2026	ITF Manchester, UK	W50	Hard (i)	(United Kingdom) Emily Appleton	(United Kingdom) Alicia Dudeney (Estonia) Elena Malõgina	6–1, 6–7^{(6)}, [7–10]
Loss	29–22	Mar 2026	ITF Monastir, Tunisia	W35	Hard	(United States) Hibah Shaikh	(Slovakia) Katarína Kužmová (France) Yasmine Mansouri	5–7, 6–7^{(5)}
Loss	29–23	Mar 2026	ITF Monastir, Tunisia	W35	Hard	(United States) Hibah Shaikh	(Germany) Josy Daems; Milana Zhabrailova	7–6^{(5)}, 3–6, [7–10]
Win	30–23	May 2026	ITF Monastir, Tunisia	W35	Hard	(Slovakia) Katarína Kužmová	(France) Yasmine Mansouri (Serbia) Elena Milovanović	6–4, 6–3
Win	31–23	May 2026	ITF Bol, Croatia	W35	Clay	(France) Yara Bartashevich	(Italy) Aurora Zantedeschi (Italy) Arianna Zucchini	6–4, 6–2
Win	32–23	Jun 2026	ITF Gdańsk, Poland	W50	Clay	(Spain) Georgina García Pérez	(Kazakhstan) Zhibek Kulambayeva (Hungary) Amarissa Tóth	3–6, 7–5, [11–9]
Loss	32–24	Aug 2026	Serbian Tennis Tour 2, Serbia	W75	Clay	(Croatia) Lucija Ćirić Bagarić	Varvara Panshina; Rada Zolotareva	5–7, 4–6
