= Martyna Kubka =

Polish tennis player (born 2001)

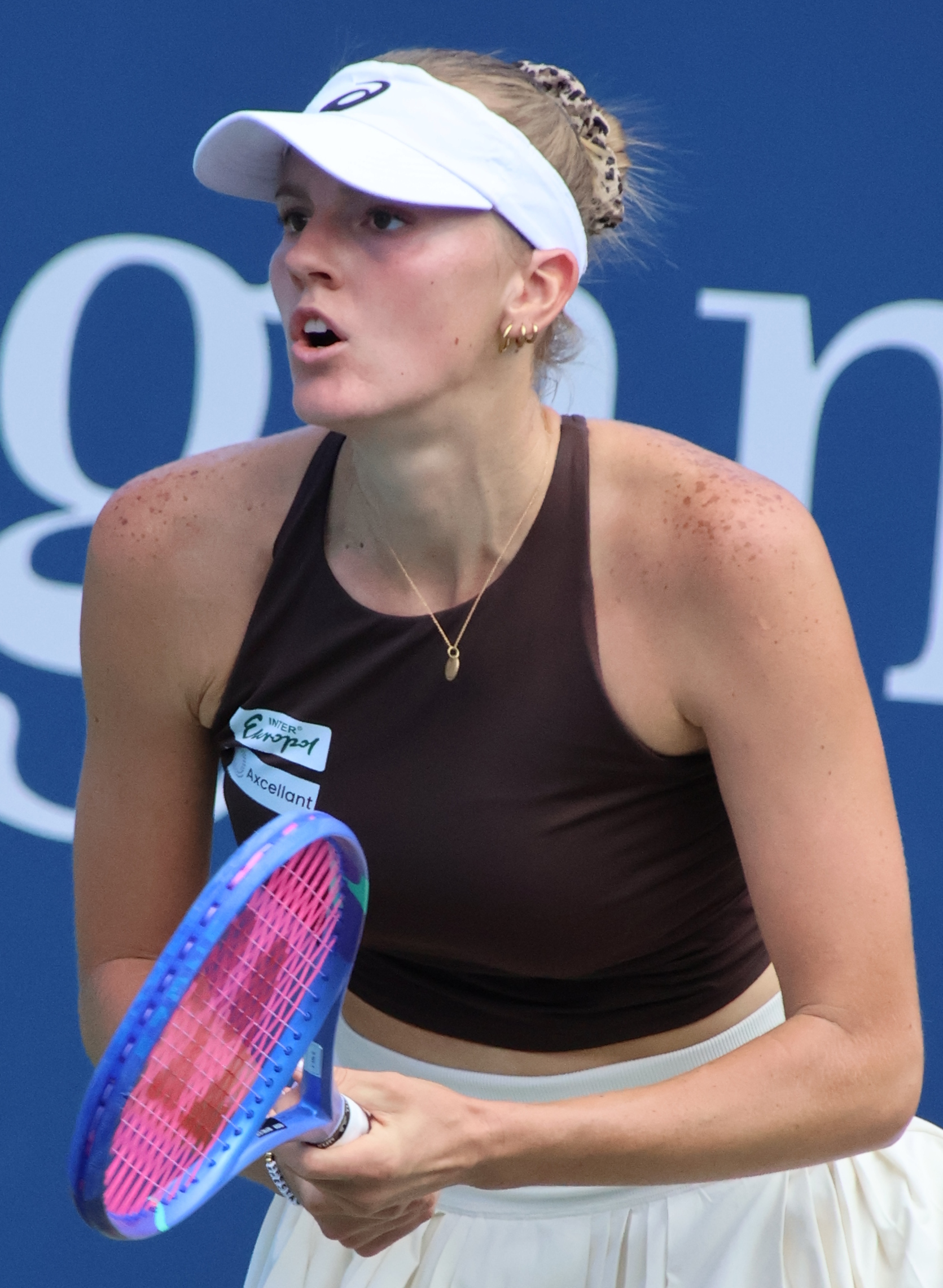
- Kubka at the 2026 US Open
- Country (sports): Poland
- Born: 19 April 2001 (age 25) Zielona Góra, Poland
- Height: 1.81 m (5 ft 11 in)
- Plays: Right-handed
- Prize money: $267,332

Singles
- Career record: 221–151
- Career titles: 5 ITF
- Highest ranking: No. 141 (9 November 2026)
- Current ranking: No. 141 (9 November 2026)

Grand Slam singles results
- US Open: Q3 (2026)

Doubles
- Career record: 229–95
- Career titles: 2 WTA Challenger, 31 ITF
- Highest ranking: No. 116 (9 November 2026)
- Current ranking: No. 116 (9 November 2026)

Team competitions
- BJK Cup: 4–2
- Last updated on: 28 September 2026.

Martyna Kubka (born 19 April 2001) is a Polish tennis player. She has a career-high WTA singles ranking of world No. 141, and a doubles ranking of No. 116, both achieved on 9 November 2026.

== Career ==
Kubka made her WTA Tour main-draw debut at the 2021 WTA Poland Open in the doubles competition with Anna Hertel.

Her singles tour-level debut was at the 2022 Poland Open, losing to Elisabetta Cocciaretto in the first round.

In November 2023, Kubka made her debut for Poland in the Billie Jean King Cup playing doubles in the Finals.

Partnering with Weronika Falkowska, she won the doubles title at the WTA 125 2024 Polish Open, defeating Céline Naef and Nina Stojanović in the final. At the 2025 Polish Open, Kubka teamed up with Isabelle Haverlag and reached the final for the second year in succession, but lost to Weronika Falkowska and Dominika Šalková.

== WTA 125 finals ==
=== Doubles: 5 (2 title, 3 runner-ups) ===
Result	W–L	Date	Tournament	Surface	Partner	Opponents	Score
Win	1–0	Jul 2024	Polish Open, Poland	Hard	(Poland) Weronika Falkowska	(Switzerland) Céline Naef (Serbia) Nina Stojanović	6–4, 7–6^{(7–5)}
Loss	1–1	Jul 2025	Polish Open, Poland	Hard	(Netherlands) Isabelle Haverlag	(Poland) Weronika Falkowska (Czech Republic) Dominika Šalková	2–6, 1–6
Loss	1–2	Aug 2026	Polish Open, Poland	Hard	(Poland) Alicja Rosolska	(Poland) Weronika Falkowska (United States) Alana Smith	3–6, 1–6
Win	2–2	Oct 2026	Internazionali di Rovereto, Italy	Hard (i)	(Netherlands) Isabelle Haverlag	(Czech Republic) Dominika Šalková (Czech Republic) Anna Sisková	6–1, 6–2
Loss	2–3	Nov 2026	Angola Ladies Open, Angola	Hard	(Lithuania) Justina Mikulskytė	(Burundi) Sada Nahimana (Kenya) Angella Okutoyi	4–6, 4–6

== ITF Circuit finals ==
=== Singles: 10 (5 titles, 5 runner-ups) ===
Legend W75 tournaments (1–0) W50 tournaments (1–2) W25 tournaments (0–2) W15 tournaments (3–1)	Finals by surface Hard (5–4) Grass (0–1)

Result	W–L	Date	Tournament	Tier	Surface	Opponent	Score
Loss	0–1	Sep 2020	ITF Santarém, Portugal	W15	Hard	(Brazil) Beatriz Haddad Maia	0–6, 0–6
Win	1–1	Sep 2023	ITF Sharm El Sheikh, Egypt	W15	Hard	(Slovakia) Katarína Kužmová	6–3, 6–0
Loss	1–2	Oct 2023	ITF Istanbul, Turkey	W25	Hard	(Finland) Anastasia Kulikova	4–6, 6-3, 1–6
Loss	1–3	Nov 2023	ITF Sëlva Gardena, Italy	W25	Hard (i)	(Czech Republic) Julie Štruplová	2–6, 2–6
Loss	1–4	Jun 2024	ITF La Marsa, Tunisia	W50	Hard	(China) Gao Xinyu	7–5, 3–6, 3–6
Win	2–4	Feb 2025	ITF Leimen, Germany	W15	Hard (i)	(Finland) Anastasia Kulikova	6–4, 7–6^{(5)}
Win	3–4	May 2025	ITF Kayseri, Turkey	W15	Hard	(Colombia) Valentina Mediorreal	7–5, 6–2
Win	4–4	Dec 2025	ITF Sëlva Gardena, Italy	W50	Hard (i)	(Germany) Noma Noha Akugue	7–5, 6–3
Loss	4–5	Jun 2026	ITF Hurghada, Egypt	W50	Grass	Polina Iatcenko	4–6, 3–6
Win	5–5	Jul 2026	Open Araba en Femenino, Spain	W75	Hard	(Lithuania) Justina Mikulskytė	5–7, 6–3, 6–3

=== Doubles: 48 (31 titles, 17 runner-ups) ===
Legend W60/75 tournaments (4–6) W50 tournaments (6–0) W25/35 tournaments (16–8) W15 tournaments (5–3)	Finals by surface Hard (18–12) Clay (9–5) Carpet (3–0) Grass (1–0)

Result	W–L	Date	Tournament	Tier	Surface	Partner	Opponents	Score
Loss	0–1	Aug 2018	ITF Warsaw Open, Poland	W25	Clay	(Poland) Stefania Rogozińska Dzik	(Poland) Maja Chwalińska (Poland) Daria Kuczer	6–3, 6–7^{(5)}, [1–10]
Loss	0–2	Aug 2019	ITF Warsaw Open, Poland	W60	Clay	(Poland) Weronika Falkowska	(Poland) Maja Chwalińska (Norway) Ulrikke Eikeri	4–6, 1–6
Win	1–2	Sep 2019	ITF Antalya, Turkey	W15	Hard	(Poland) Weronika Falkowska	(Japan) Rina Saigo (Japan) Yukina Saigo	5–7, 6–4, [10–8]
Win	2–2	Oct 2019	ITF Sharm El Sheikh, Egypt	W15	Hard	(Poland) Weronika Falkowska	(Romania) Elena-Teodora Cadar (Australia) Jelena Stojanovic	7–5, 6–1
Loss	2–3	Jan 2020	ITF Liepāja, Latvia	W15	Hard (i)	(Poland) Weronika Falkowska	(Belarus) Katyarina Paulenka (Russia) Ekaterina Shalimova	6–4, 3–6, [10–12]
Loss	2–4	Sep 2020	ITF Santarém, Portugal	W15	Hard	(Ukraine) Valeriya Strakhova	(Portugal) Francisca Jorge (Spain) Olga Parres Azcoitia	2–6, 3–6
Win	3–4	Oct 2020	ITF Sharm El Sheikh, Egypt	W15	Hard	(Ukraine) Viktoriia Dema	(United Kingdom) Emily Arbuthnott (United Kingdom) Freya Christie	6–4, 6–3
Loss	3–5	Nov 2020	ITF Haabneeme, Estonia	W15	Hard	(United Kingdom) Emily Appleton	(Lithuania) Justina Mikulskytė (Netherlands) Lexie Stevens	2–6, 1–6
Win	4–5	May 2021	ITF Shymkent, Kazakhstan	W15	Clay	(Kazakhstan) Zhibek Kulambayeva	(Russia) Ekaterina Reyngold (Russia) Ekaterina Shalimova	7–6^{(3)}, 5–7, [10–8]
Win	5–5	Jun 2021	ITF Shymkent, Kazakhstan	W15	Clay	(Kazakhstan) Zhibek Kulambayeva	(Russia) Ekaterina Reyngold (Russia) Ekaterina Shalimova	6–4, 6–4
Win	6–5	Jul 2021	ITF Wrocław, Poland	W25	Clay	(Poland) Anna Hertel	(Italy) Nuria Brancaccio (Turkey) İpek Öz	6–7^{(2)}, 6–3, [10–7]
Win	7–5	Sep 2021	ITF Vienna, Austria	W25	Clay	(Brazil) Carolina Alves	(Russia) Erika Andreeva (Russia) Ekaterina Kazionova	6–7^{(1)}, 6–4, [10–7]
Win	8–5	Oct 2021	ITF Karaganda, Kazakhstan	W25	Hard (i)	(Kazakhstan) Zhibek Kulambayeva	(Serbia) Tamara Čurović (Estonia) Elena Malõgina	7–5, 6–4
Loss	8–6	Jun 2022	ITF Pörtschach, Austria	W25	Clay	(Sweden) Caijsa Hennemann	(Czech Republic) Michaela Bayerlová (Slovenia) Tina Cvetkovič	3–6, 3–6
Win	9–6	Jun 2022	ITF Ystad, Sweden	W25	Clay	(Sweden) Caijsa Hennemann	(United States) Ashley Lahey (Sweden) Lisa Zaar	4–6, 7–5, [10–7]
Loss	9–7	Oct 2022	ITF Austin, United States	W25	Hard	(United States) Ashley Lahey	(Australia) Elysia Bolton (United States) Jamie Loeb	3–6, 3–6
Loss	9–8	Oct 2022	GB Pro-Series Loughborough, UK	W25	Hard (i)	(Estonia) Elena Malõgina	(Chinese Taipei) Joanna Garland (Czech Republic) Gabriela Knutson	3–6, 3–6
Loss	9–9	May 2023	ITF Båstad, Sweden	W25	Clay	(Kazakhstan) Zhibek Kulambayeva	(Switzerland) Jenny Dürst (Sweden) Fanny Östlund	4-6, 7–6^{(3)}, [7-10]
Win	10–9	May 2023	ITF Kuršumlijska Banja, Serbia	W25	Clay	(Kazakhstan) Zhibek Kulambayeva	Alexandra Azarko; Victoria Borodulina	6–3, 6–3
Win	11–9	Aug 2023	ITF Prague Open, Czech Republic	W60	Clay	(Kazakhstan) Zhibek Kulambayeva	(Italy) Angelica Moratelli (Italy) Camilla Rosatello	7–6^{(3)}, 6–4
Win	12–9	Oct 2023	ITF Reims, France	W25	Hard (i)	(Sweden) Lisa Zaar	Julia Avdeeva; Anna Chekanskaya	6–3, 6–2
Win	13–9	Oct 2023	ITF Cherbourg-en-Cotentin, France	W25+H	Hard (i)	(Kazakhstan) Zhibek Kulambayeva	(France) Yasmine Mansouri (Belgium) Lara Salden	6–0, 6–3
Win	14–9	Nov 2023	ITF Selva Gardena, Italy	W25	Hard (i)	(Netherlands) Jasmijn Gimbrère	(Serbia) Bojana Marinković (Luxembourg) Marie Weckerle	6–1, 6–4
Loss	14–10	Feb 2024	ITF Helsinki, Finland	W35	Hard (i)	(Greece) Valentini Grammatikopoulou	(Finland) Laura Hietaranta (Czech Republic) Linda Klimovičová	3–6, 1–6
Win	15–10	Mar 2024	ITF Solarino, Italy	W35	Carpet	(Chinese Taipei) Tsao Chia-yi	(Serbia) Katarina Kozarov; Veronika Miroshnichenko	6–4, 6–2
Win	16–10	Mar 2024	ITF Solarino, Italy	W35	Carpet	(Poland) Weronika Falkowska	(China) Feng Shuo (Netherlands) Stéphanie Visscher	5–7, 6–1, [11–9]
Win	17–10	Apr 2024	ITF Santa Margherita di Pula, Italy	W35	Clay	(Greece) Sapfo Sakellaridi	(Italy) Anastasia Abbagnato (Netherlands) Eva Vedder	6–3, 3–6, [10–6]
Win	18–10	Apr 2024	ITF Santa Margherita di Pula, Italy	W35	Clay	(Netherlands) Eva Vedder	(Greece) Eleni Christofi (Greece) Sapfo Sakellaridi	7–5, 6–3
Win	19–10	Jun 2024	ITF Palma del Río, Spain	W50	Hard	(Belgium) Lara Salden	(India) Rutuja Bhosale (United States) Sophie Chang	6–2, 6–1
Win	20–10	Jul 2024	ITF Corroios, Portugal	W50	Hard	(United States) Anna Rogers	(Portugal) Matilde Jorge (Australia) Elena Micic	6–1, 6–4
Win	21–10	Aug 2024	ITF Ourense, Spain	W50	Hard	(Belgium) Lara Salden	(Portugal) Matilde Jorge (United States) Anna Rogers	3–6, 6–3, [10–8]
Loss	21–11	Oct 2024	Internationaux de Poitiers, France	W75	Hard (i)	(Switzerland) Conny Perrin	(Germany) Anna-Lena Friedsam (Switzerland) Céline Naef	4–6, 1–6
Win	22–11	Nov 2024	ITF Sëlva Gardena, Italy	W50	Hard (i)	(Sweden) Lisa Zaar	(Germany) Carolina Kuhl (Serbia) Mia Ristić	6–3, 6–0
Win	23–11	Dec 2024	ITF Sharm El Sheikh, Egypt	W35	Hard	(Slovakia) Katarína Kužmová	Varvara Panshina; Daria Zelinskaya	6–2, 7–6^{(2)}
Loss	23–12	Feb 2025	ITF Leszno, Poland	W75	Hard (i)	(Poland) Weronika Falkowska	(Czech Republic) Ivana Šebestová (Hong Kong) Cody Wong	4–6, 6–1, [4–10]
Loss	23–13	Feb 2025	ITF Manchester, UK	W35	Hard (i)	(Poland) Weronika Falkowska	(Canada) Ariana Arseneault (United States) Anna Rogers	7–6^{(5)}, 1–6, [8–10]
Loss	23–14	Mar 2025	ITF Helsinki, Finland	W35	Hard (i)	(Turkey) Ayla Aksu	(Finland) Laura Hietaranta (United Kingdom) Ella McDonald	3–6, 4–6
Win	24–14	Mar 2025	Open Nantes Atlantique, France	W50	Hard (i)	(Sweden) Lisa Zaar	(Belgium) Sofia Costoulas (Australia) Talia Gibson	6–3, 6–2
Win	25–14	Sep 2025	ITF Monastir, Tunisia	W35	Hard	(Slovakia) Katarína Kužmová	(United States) Carolyn Ansari (Canada) Ariana Arseneault	7–5, 6–4
Loss	25–15	Sep 2025	Bratislava Open, Slovakia	W75	Hard (i)	(Czech Republic) Aneta Laboutková	(Czech Republic) Lucie Havlíčková (United Kingdom) Lily Miyazaki	6–3, 3–6, [9–11]
Win	26–15	Oct 2025	Hamburg Ladies Cup, Germany	W75	Hard (i)	(Greece) Sapfo Sakellaridi	(Germany) Tessa Brockmann (Germany) Phillippa Preugschat	6–3, 6–2
Win	27–15	Oct 2025	ITF Villeneuve-d'Ascq, France	W35	Hard (i)	(Greece) Sapfo Sakellaridi	(France) Diana Martynov (France) Marie Villet	7–5, 6–1
Win	28–15	Feb 2026	AK Ladies Open, Germany	W75	Carpet (i)	(Lithuania) Justina Mikulskytė	(Germany) Tessa Brockmann (Germany) Nastasja Schunk	6–1, 6–2
Win	29–15	Apr 2026	ITF Sharm El Sheikh, Egypt	W35	Hard	(Slovakia) Katarína Kužmová	(Egypt) Sandra Samir (Slovakia) Radka Zelníčková	6–4, 6–1
Win	30–15	Apr 2026	ITF Lopota, Georgia	W75	Hard	(Czech Republic) Vendula Valdmannová	(India) Rutuja Bhosale (India) Ankita Raina	6–2, 6–3
Loss	30–16	May 2026	Slovak Open, Slovakia	W75	Clay	(Lithuania) Justina Mikulskytė	(Romania) Irina Bara (United Kingdom) Madeleine Brooks	5–7, 2–6
Win	31–16	Jun 2026	ITF Hurghada, Egypt	W50	Grass	Polina Iatcenko	(Cyprus) Olga Danilova (Croatia) Karla Popović	6–2, 6–2
Loss	31–17	Sep 2026	ITF Féminin Le Neubourg, France	W75	Hard	(Czech Republic) Anna Sisková	(United Kingdom) Naiktha Bains (India) Sahaja Yamalapalli	6–3, 4–6, [9–11]
