= Weronika Ewald =

Polish tennis player (born 2006)

- Country (sports): Poland
- Born: 20 February 2006 (age 20)
- Plays: Right (two-handed backhand)
- Prize money: $62,817

Singles
- Career record: 105–74
- Career titles: 2 ITF
- Highest ranking: No. 333 (16 November 2026)
- Current ranking: No. 333 (16 November 2026)

Doubles
- Career record: 36–27
- Career titles: 2 ITF
- Highest ranking: No. 443 (24 November 2025)
- Current ranking: No. 919 (2 November 2026)
- Last updated on: 30 November 2026.

Weronika Ewald (born 20 February 2006) is a Polish tennis player. She has a career-high WTA singles ranking of world No. 333 achieved on 16 November 2026.

== Career ==
=== 2022: WTA doubles debut ===
Ewald made her WTA Tour main-draw debut at the 2022 WTA Poland Open, having received a wildcard into the doubles draw with Zuzanna Bednarz; they lost their first-round match to Natela Dzalamidze and Viktorija Golubic.

=== 2023: WTA singles and BJK Cup debuts ===
Ewald reached the quarterfinals of the 2023 Australian Open junior singles tournament, losing to Ranah Stoiber.

In 2023, she made her WTA Tour main-draw debut in singles at the 2023 WTA Poland Open, also after receiving a wildcard, where she lost in the first round to Rebecca Šramková.

==== BJK Cup representation ====
She was named into the Poland Billie Jean King Cup team for the 2023 qualifying round, after Iga Świątek withdrew due to injury, but did not play.

== ITF Circuit finals ==
=== Singles: 7 (3 titles, 4 runner-ups) ===
Legend W25/35 tournaments (1–3) W15 tournaments (2–1)	Finals by surface Hard (3–3) Clay (0–1)

Result	W–L	Date	Tournament	Tier	Surface	Opponent	Score
Win	1–0	Nov 2023	ITF Sharm El Sheikh, Egypt	W15	Hard	Maria Golovina	7–5, 6–7^{(5)}, 6–1
Loss	1–1	May 2024	ITF Bol, Croatia	W15	Clay	(Germany) Sina Herrmann	5–7, 4–6
Win	2–1	Apr 2025	ITF Sharm El Sheikh, Egypt	W15	Hard	(Luxembourg) Marie Weckerle	3–6, 6–4, 6–0
Loss	2–2	Dec 2025	ITF Sharm El Sheikh, Egypt	W35	Hard	(France) Julie Belgraver	7–5, 6–7^{(2)}, 4–6
Loss	2–3	Apr 2026	ITF Sharm El Sheikh, Egypt	W35	Hard	(Netherlands) Stephanie Visscher	1–6, 4–6
Loss	2–4	Nov 2026	ITF Marsa, Malta	W35	Hard	(Greece) Valentini Grammatikopoulou	4–6, 3–6
Win	3–4	Nov 2026	ITF Liberec, Czech Republic	W35	Hard (i)	(Germany) Julia Stusek	6-2, 0-1 ret

=== Doubles: 7 (2 titles, 5 runner-ups) ===
Legend W40/50 tournaments (1–2) W15 tournaments (1–3)	Finals by surface Hard (0–4) Clay (2–1)

Result	W–L	Date	Tournament	Tier	Surface	Partner	Opponents	Score
Loss	0–1	Aug 2023	ITF Wroclaw, Poland	W40	Clay	(Poland) Daria Kuczer	(Georgia (country)) Ekaterine Gorgodze (Slovenia) Dalila Jakupović	4–6, 6–4, [7–10]
Loss	0–2	Mar 2024	ITF Sharm El Sheikh, Egypt	W15	Hard	(Hong Kong) Adithya Karunaratne	(Slovakia) Salma Drugdová (Poland) Daria Kuczer	4–6, 3–6
Loss	0–3	Apr 2024	ITF Sharm El Sheikh, Egypt	W15	Hard	(Poland) Daria Kuczer	Victoria Mikhaylova (Ukraine) Anastasiia Poplavska	3–6, 6–2, [12–14]
Win	1–3	Aug 2024	ITF Bielsko-Biała, Poland	W15	Clay	(Poland) Daria Kuczer	(Czech Republic) Karolína Kubáňová (Czech Republic) Aneta Laboutková	7–5, 1–6, [10–6]
Loss	1–4	Mar 2025	ITF Sharm El Sheikh, Egypt	W15	Hard	(Poland) Daria Gorska	(Netherlands) Madelief Hageman (United States) Dasha Ivanova	4–6, 5–7
Loss	1–5	Jun 2025	ITF Montemor-o-Novo, Portugal	W50	Hard	(Lithuania) Iveta Dapkutė	Aliona Falei; Polina Iatcenko	3–6, 5–7
Win	2–5	Aug 2025	ITF Bytom, Poland	W50	Clay	(Poland) Zuzanna Pawlikowska	(Czech Republic) Aneta Kučmová (Italy) Miriana Tona	3–6, 6–3, [10–7]
