= 2013 Trabzon Cup =

In 2013 there were two tennis tournaments which were known as the 2013 Trabzon Cup:

- 2013 Trabzon Cup (1), which began on 2 September
- 2013 Trabzon Cup (2), which began on 9 September

== See also ==
- Trabzon Cup
