= 2021 Kozerki Open =

Tennis tournament

- Date: 26 July–1 August 2021
- Edition: 2nd
- Category: ITF Women's World Tennis Tour
- Prize money: $60,000
- Surface: Clay
- Location: Grodzisk Mazowiecki, Poland

Champions

Singles
- (Georgia (country)) Ekaterine Gorgodze

Doubles
- (Chile) Bárbara Gatica / (Brazil) Rebeca Pereira
← 2019 ·	Kozerki Open	· 2022 →

The 2021 Kozerki Open was a professional women's tennis tournament played on outdoor clay courts. It was the second edition of the tournament which was part of the 2021 ITF Women's World Tennis Tour. It took place in Grodzisk Mazowiecki, Poland between 26 July and 1 August 2021.

== Singles main-draw entrants ==
=== Seeds ===
Country	Player	Rank^{1}	Seed
HUN	Dalma Gálfi	151	1
TUR	Çağla Büyükakçay	196	2
GEO	Ekaterine Gorgodze	208	3
ROU	Gabriela Talabă	211	4
GRE	Despina Papamichail	216	5
FRA	Chloé Paquet	219	6
FRA	Tessah Andrianjafitrimo	226	7
ESP	Irene Burillo Escorihuela	235	8

- ^{1} Rankings are as of 19 July 2021.

=== Other entrants ===
The following players received wildcards into the singles main draw:

- (Poland) Weronika Baszak
- (Poland) Ania Hertel
- (Belarus) Anna Kubareva
- (Poland) Martyna Kubka

The following players received entry from the qualifying draw:

- (Argentina) María Lourdes Carlé
- (Venezuela) Andrea Gámiz
- (Chile) Bárbara Gatica
- (France) Alice Ramé
- (Czech Republic) Tereza Smitková
- (Latvia) Daniela Vismane

The following players received entry as lucky losers:

- (Uzbekistan) Akgul Amanmuradova
- (United States) Jessie Aney
- (Russia) Amina Anshba
- (Russia) Valeriia Olianovskaia

== Champions ==
=== Singles ===
- (Georgia (country)) Ekaterine Gorgodze def. (France) Chloé Paquet, 7–6^{(9–7)}, 0–6, 6–4

=== Doubles ===
- (Chile) Bárbara Gatica / (Brazil) Rebeca Pereira def. (South Korea) Jang Su-jeong / (Chinese Taipei) Lee Ya-hsuan, 6–3, 6–1
