= 2021 Kozerki Open – Doubles =

Doubles
- 2021 Kozerki Open

Final
- Champions: (Chile) Bárbara Gatica (Brazil) Rebeca Pereira
- Runners-up: (South Korea) Jang Su-jeong (Chinese Taipei) Lee Ya-hsuan
- Score: 6–3, 6–1

Events
Singles	Doubles
← 2019 ·	Kozerki Open	· 2022 →

Ania Hertel and Anastasiya Shoshyna were the defending champions but Shoshyna was unable to participate due to a doping suspension. Hertel partnered alongside Martyna Kubka, but lost in the semifinals to Bárbara Gatica and Rebeca Pereira.

Gatica and Pereira went on to win the title, defeating Jang Su-jeong and Lee Ya-hsuan in the final, 6–3, 6–1.

== Seeds ==
1. (Uzbekistan) Akgul Amanmuradova / (Switzerland) Conny Perrin (semifinals)
2. (Slovenia) Dalila Jakupović / (Latvia) Diāna Marcinkēviča (quarterfinals)
3. (Russia) Amina Anshba / (Russia) Anastasia Zakharova (first round)
4. (United Kingdom) Alicia Barnett / (United Kingdom) Olivia Nicholls (quarterfinals)

== Draw ==
=== Key ===
- Q = Qualifier
- WC = Wild card
- LL = Lucky loser
- Alt = Alternate
- SE = Special exempt
- PR = Protected ranking
- ITF = ITF entry
- JE = Junior exempt
- w/o = Walkover
- r = Retired
- d = Defaulted
- SR = Special ranking

=== Draw ===
First round
1	(Uzbekistan) A Amanmuradova (Switzerland) C Perrin	6^{0}	6	[10]
(Japan) H Kuwata (Colombia) Y Lizarazo	7^{7}	3	[8]
(Germany) S Herrmann (France) A Ramé	1	4
(Belarus) A Kubareva (Latvia) D Vismane	6	6
4	(United Kingdom) A Barnett (United Kingdom) O Nicholls	6	6
(Spain) I Burillo Escorihuela (Greece) D Papamichail	2	4
(South Korea) S-j Jang (Chinese Taipei) Y-h Lee	6	4	[14]
(Japan) N Hanatani (Romania) A Prisăcariu	3	6	[12]
(Mexico) F Contreras (Mexico) AS Sánchez	5	1
(Poland) A Hertel (Poland) M Kubka	7	6
WC	(United Kingdom) A Collins (Venezuela) A Gámiz	2	6	[10]
3	(Russia) A Anshba (Russia) A Zakharova	6	0	[3]
WC	(Poland) W Baszak (Russia) V Olianovskaia	3	6	[8]
(Chile) B Gatica (Brazil) R Pereira	6	4	[10]
WC	(Poland) WJ Foryś (Poland) R Gruszczyńska	4	2
2	(Slovenia) D Jakupović (Latvia) D Marcinkēviča	6	6

Quarterfinals
1	(Uzbekistan) A Amanmuradova (Switzerland) C Perrin	6	6
(Belarus) A Kubareva (Latvia) D Vismane	4	3
4	(United Kingdom) A Barnett (United Kingdom) O Nicholls	2	6	[7]
(South Korea) S-j Jang (Chinese Taipei) Y-h Lee	6	3	[10]
(Poland) A Hertel (Poland) M Kubka	7^{7}	1	[10]
WC	(United Kingdom) A Collins (Venezuela) A Gámiz	6^{4}	6	[7]
(Chile) B Gatica (Brazil) R Pereira	6	6
2	(Slovenia) D Jakupović (Latvia) D Marcinkēviča	2	4

Semifinals
1	(Uzbekistan) A Amanmuradova (Switzerland) C Perrin	2	2
(South Korea) S-j Jang (Chinese Taipei) Y-h Lee	6	6
(Poland) A Hertel (Poland) M Kubka	6	2	[7]
(Chile) B Gatica (Brazil) R Pereira	3	6	[10]

Final
(South Korea) S-j Jang (Chinese Taipei) Y-h Lee	3	1
(Chile) B Gatica (Brazil) R Pereira	6	6
