= 2021 Kozerki Open – Singles =

Singles
- 2021 Kozerki Open

Final
- Champion: (Georgia (country)) Ekaterine Gorgodze
- Runner-up: (France) Chloé Paquet
- Score: 7–6^{(9–7)}, 0–6, 6–4

Events
Singles	Doubles
← 2019 ·	Kozerki Open	· 2022 →

Maja Chwalińska was the defending champion but chose not to participate.

Ekaterine Gorgodze won the title, defeating Chloé Paquet in the final, 7–6^{(9–7)}, 0–6, 6–4.

== Seeds ==
1. (Hungary) Dalma Gálfi (quarterfinals)
2. (Turkey) Çağla Büyükakçay (second round)
3. (Georgia (country)) Ekaterine Gorgodze (champion)
4. (Romania) Gabriela Talabă (second round)
5. (Greece) Despina Papamichail (quarterfinals)
6. (France) Chloé Paquet (final)
7. (France) Tessah Andrianjafitrimo (semifinals)
8. (Spain) Irene Burillo Escorihuela (first round)

== Draw ==
=== Key ===
- Q = Qualifier
- WC = Wild card
- LL = Lucky loser
- Alt = Alternate
- ITF = ITF entry
- PR = Protected ranking
- SR = Special ranking
- SE = Special exempt
- JE = Junior exempt
- JR = Junior Accelerator Programme entrant
- CO = College Accelerator Programme entrant
- NG = Next Gen Accelerator Program entrant
- w/o = Walkover
- r = Retired
- d = Defaulted

=== Finals ===
Semifinals
7	(France) Tessah Andrianjafitrimo	6	5	4
3	(Georgia (country)) Ekaterine Gorgodze	4	7	6
Q	(Chile) Bárbara Gatica	3	3
6	(France) Chloé Paquet	6	6

Final
3	(Georgia (country)) Ekaterine Gorgodze	7^{9}	0	6
6	(France) Chloé Paquet	6^{7}	6	4

=== Top half ===
First round
1	(Hungary) D Gálfi	6	6
WC	(Poland) W Baszak	3	0
(Latvia) D Marcinkēviča	2	2
Q	(Argentina) ML Carlé	6	6
Q	(France) A Ramé	6	7^{7}
(Switzerland) C Perrin	1	6^{5}
WC	(Belarus) A Kubareva	2	2
7	(France) T Andrianjafitrimo	6	6
3	(Georgia (country)) E Gorgodze	6	6
(Romania) I Fetecău	2	2
Q	(Latvia) D Vismane	6	6
(Mexico) AS Sánchez	1	0
WC	(Poland) M Kubka	6	6
LL	(Russia) A Anshba	4	4
Q	(Venezuela) A Gámiz	6	3	6^{6}
5	(Greece) D Papamichail	3	6	7^{8}

Second round
1	(Hungary) D Gálfi	6	6^{5}	6
Q	(Argentina) ML Carlé	2	7^{7}	0
Q	(France) A Ramé	6	4	1
7	(France) T Andrianjafitrimo	1	6	6
3	(Georgia (country)) E Gorgodze	6	7^{8}
Q	(Latvia) D Vismane	2	6^{6}
WC	(Poland) M Kubka	3	4
5	(Greece) D Papamichail	6	6

Quarterfinals
1	(Hungary) D Gálfi	4	1
7	(France) T Andrianjafitrimo	6	6
3	(Georgia (country)) E Gorgodze	6	6
5	(Greece) D Papamichail	3	0

Semifinals
7	(France) T Andrianjafitrimo	6	5	4
3	(Georgia (country)) E Gorgodze	4	7	6

=== Bottom half ===
First round
8	(Spain) I Burillo Escorihuela	0	5
Q	(Czech Republic) T Smitková	6	7
(South Korea) S-j Jang	6	6
LL	(Russia) V Olianovskaia	4	2
Q	(Chile) B Gatica	6	4
(Mexico) F Contreras	4	0^{r}
(Chinese Taipei) Y-h Lee	7^{7}	2	4
4	(Romania) G Talabă	6^{5}	6	6
6	(France) C Paquet	6	5	6
LL	(United States) J Aney	3	7	1
(Slovenia) D Jakupović	7^{7}	6
(Japan) K Okamura	6^{3}	2
WC	(Poland) A Hertel	3	2
(Russia) A Zakharova	6	6
LL	(Uzbekistan) A Amanmuradova	4	6	3
2	(Turkey) Ç Büyükakçay	6	1	6

Second round
Q	(Czech Republic) T Smitková	0	1
(South Korea) S-j Jang	6	6
Q	(Chile) B Gatica	2	6	6
4	(Romania) G Talabă	6	3	3
6	(France) C Paquet	6	6
(Slovenia) D Jakupović	1	4
(Russia) A Zakharova	7^{7}	7^{9}
2	(Turkey) Ç Büyükakçay	6^{5}	6^{7}

Quarterfinals
(South Korea) S-j Jang	4	0
Q	(Chile) B Gatica	6	6
6	(France) C Paquet	6	2	6
(Russia) A Zakharova	2	6	4

Semifinals
Q	(Chile) B Gatica	3	3
6	(France) C Paquet	6	6
