= 2022 Polish Open =

Tennis tournament

- Date: 1–7 August 2022
- Edition: 3rd
- Category: ITF Women's World Tennis Tour
- Prize money: $100,000
- Surface: Hard / Outdoor
- Location: Grodzisk Mazowiecki, Poland

Champions

Singles
- (Czech Republic) Kateřina Siniaková

Doubles
- (United Kingdom) Alicia Barnett / (United Kingdom) Olivia Nicholls
← 2021 ·	Kozerki Open	· 2023 →

The 2022 Polish Open was a professional tennis tournament played on outdoor hard courts. It was the third edition of the tournament which was part of the 2022 ITF Women's World Tennis Tour. It took place in Grodzisk Mazowiecki, Poland between 1 and 7 August 2022.

== Champions ==
=== Singles ===
- (Czech Republic) Kateřina Siniaková def. (Poland) Magda Linette, 6–4, 6–1

=== Doubles ===
- (United Kingdom) Alicia Barnett / (United Kingdom) Olivia Nicholls def. (Germany) Vivian Heisen / (Poland) Katarzyna Kawa 6–1, 7–6^{(7–3)}

== Singles main draw entrants ==
=== Seeds ===
Country	Player	Rank^{1}	Seed
POL	Magda Linette	68	1
POL	Magdalena Fręch	82	2
CZE	Kateřina Siniaková	86	3
BUL	Viktoriya Tomova	110	4
CZE	Linda Nosková	112	5
~~UKR~~	~~Daria Snigur~~	~~128~~	~~6~~
POL	Katarzyna Kawa	145	7
FRA	Jessika Ponchet	152	8
UZB	Nigina Abduraimova	186	9
SVK	Viktória Kužmová	192	10
GBR	Yuriko Miyazaki	202	11
SRB	Natalija Stevanović	234	12
MKD	Lina Gjorcheska	239	13
GER	Katharina Hobgarski	246	14
SVK	Rebecca Šramková	254	15
CRO	Jana Fett	263	16

- ^{1} Rankings are as of 25 July 2022.

=== Other entrants ===
The following players received wildcards into the singles main draw:

- (Poland) Magdalena Fręch
- (Czech Republic) Lucie Havlíčková
- (Poland) Ania Hertel
- (Poland) Martyna Kubka
- Valeriia Olianovskaia

The following players received entry into the singles main draw using protected rankings:

- (Australia) Zoe Hives
- (Australia) Kaylah McPhee
- (Belgium) Yanina Wickmayer

The following players received entry from the qualifying draw:

- (United Kingdom) Alicia Barnett
- (Czech Republic) Nikola Břečková
- (Lithuania) Iveta Dapkutė
- Kristina Dmitruk
- (Poland) Olivia Lincer
- (Czech Republic) Laetitia Pulchartová
- (Poland) Stefania Rogozińska Dzik
- (Slovakia) Laura Svatíková

The following player received entry as a lucky loser:

- (United States) Amy Zhu
