= 2013 Trabzon Cup (1) =

- Date: 2–8 September
- Edition: 1st
- Draw: 32S/16D
- Prize money: $50,000
- Surface: Hard
- Location: Trabzon, Turkey

Champions

Singles
- (Serbia) Aleksandra Krunić

Doubles
- (Ukraine) Yuliya Beygelzimer / (Ukraine) Maryna Zanevska
- Trabzon Cup (1)

The 2013 Trabzon Cup was a professional tennis tournament played on outdoor hard courts. It was the first edition of the tournament which was part of the 2013 ITF Women's Circuit, offering a total of $50,000 in prize money. It took place in Trabzon, Turkey, on 2–8 September 2013. This was the first Trabzon Cup of the year, the 2013 Trabzon Cup (2) was held a week later.

== Singles entrants ==
=== Seeds ===
Country	Player	Rank^{1}	Seed
GER	Dinah Pfizenmaier	99	1
UKR	Maryna Zanevska	113	2
SLO	Tadeja Majerič	122	3
CZE	Kristýna Plíšková	131	4
RUS	Nina Bratchikova	139	5
RUS	Ekaterina Bychkova	153	6
POL	Magda Linette	157	7
SRB	Aleksandra Krunić	158	8

- ^{1} Rankings as of 26 August 2013

=== Other entrants ===
The following players received wildcards into the singles main draw:

- (Turkey) Cemre Anıl
- (Turkey) Naz Karagöz
- (Germany) Dinah Pfizenmaier
- (Turkey) Ege Tomey

The following players received entry from the qualifying draw:

- (Turkey) Melis Sezer
- (Germany) Christina Shakovets
- (United Kingdom) Emily Webley-Smith
- (Russia) Ekaterina Yashina

The following players received entry into the singles main draw as lucky losers:

- (Armenia) Ani Amiraghyan
- (Italy) Claudia Coppola

== Champions ==
=== Singles ===
- (Serbia) Aleksandra Krunić def. (France) Stéphanie Foretz Gacon 1–6, 6–4, 6–3

=== Doubles ===
- (Ukraine) Yuliya Beygelzimer / (Ukraine) Maryna Zanevska def. (Ukraine) Alona Fomina / (Germany) Christina Shakovets 6–3, 6–1
