= 2021 WTA Poland Open – Singles =

Singles
- 2021 WTA Poland Open

Final
- Champion: (Belgium) Maryna Zanevska
- Runner-up: (Slovakia) Kristína Kučová
- Score: 6–4, 7–6^{(7–4)}

Details
- Draw: 32
- Seeds: 8

Events
Singles	Doubles
← 2004 ·	WTA Poland Open	· 2022 →

Maryna Zanevska won her maiden WTA Tour singles title, defeating Kristína Kučová in the final, 6–4, 7–6^{(7–4)}.

== Seeds ==
1. (Kazakhstan) Yulia Putintseva (withdrew)
2. (Slovenia) Tamara Zidanšek (withdrew)
3. (Romania) Irina-Camelia Begu (second round)
4. (Czech Republic) Tereza Martincová (withdrew)
5. (Russia) Anna Blinkova (first round)
6. (Belarus) Aliaksandra Sasnovich (second round)
7. (Russia) Varvara Gracheva (first round)
8. (Ukraine) Anhelina Kalinina (withdrew)
9. (Spain) Nuria Párrizas Díaz (quarterfinals)
10. (Romania) Irina Bara (second round)
11. (Belarus) Olga Govortsova (first round)

== Draw ==
=== Key ===
- Q = Qualifier
- WC = Wild card
- LL = Lucky loser
- Alt = Alternate
- ITF = ITF entry
- PR = Protected ranking
- SR = Special ranking
- SE = Special exempt
- JE = Junior exempt
- JR = Junior Accelerator Programme entrant
- CO = College Accelerator Programme entrant
- NG = Next Gen Accelerator Program entrant
- w/o = Walkover
- r = Retired
- d = Defaulted

=== Finals ===
Semifinals
SE	(Belgium) Maryna Zanevska	6	4	6
(Ukraine) Kateryna Kozlova	2	6	3
(Slovakia) Kristína Kučová	6	6
(Germany) Tamara Korpatsch	0	3

Final
SE	(Belgium) Maryna Zanevska	6	7^{7}
(Slovakia) Kristína Kučová	4	6^{4}

=== Top half ===
First round
9	(Spain) N Párrizas Díaz	6	2	6
(Poland) M Fręch	3	6	4
(France) H Tan	4	2
LL	(Russia) A Anshba	6	6
SE	(Belgium) M Zanevska	6	6
LL	(United States) J Loeb	2	0
(Slovakia) V Kužmová	6	6^{4}	7
7	(Russia) V Gracheva	4	7^{7}	5
3	(Romania) I-C Begu	6	6
(Belgium) Y Bonaventure	1	2
(Poland) K Kawa	6	1	6
LL	(Croatia) T Mrdeža	3	6	2
(Ukraine) K Kozlova	7^{7}	6
WC	(United States) K Volynets	6^{3}	2
WC	(Poland) W Baszak	6	1	2
6	(Belarus) A Sasnovich	3	6	6

Second round
9	(Spain) N Párrizas Díaz	6	6
LL	(Russia) A Anshba	4	2
SE	(Belgium) M Zanevska	6	6
(Slovakia) V Kužmová	2	1
3	(Romania) I-C Begu	2	4
(Poland) K Kawa	6	6
(Ukraine) K Kozlova	2	6	6
6	(Belarus) A Sasnovich	6	4	3

Quarterfinals
9	(Spain) N Párrizas Díaz	3	2
SE	(Belgium) M Zanevska	6	6
(Poland) K Kawa	7	5	1
(Ukraine) K Kozlova	5	7	6

Semifinals
SE	(Belgium) M Zanevska	6	4	6
(Ukraine) K Kozlova	2	6	3

=== Bottom half ===
First round
LL	(Russia) A Zakharova	7^{7}	3	1
Q	(Georgia (country)) E Gorgodze	6^{5}	6	6
LL	(Russia) M Melnikova	6	6^{4}	3
(United States) V Lepchenko	4	7^{7}	6
WC	(Poland) U Radwańska	2	1
(Slovakia) K Kučová	6	6
Q	(Italy) F Di Sarra	3	6	5
10	(Romania) I Bara	6	1	7
5	(Russia) A Blinkova	3	3
(Slovakia) AK Schmiedlová	6	6
WC	(Russia) V Olianovskaia	5	3
Q	(Hungary) A Bondár	7	6
Q	(Ukraine) K Bondarenko	0	2
LL	(Poland) W Falkowska	6	6
(Germany) T Korpatsch	1	7	7
11	(Belarus) O Govortsova	6	5	5

Second round
Q	(Georgia (country)) E Gorgodze	7^{7}	6
(United States) V Lepchenko	6^{5}	2
(Slovakia) K Kučová	3	7	6
10	(Romania) I Bara	6	5	4
(Slovakia) AK Schmiedlová	2	7^{7}	1
Q	(Hungary) A Bondár	6	6^{5}	6
LL	(Poland) W Falkowska	5	1
(Germany) T Korpatsch	7	6

Quarterfinals
Q	(Georgia (country)) E Gorgodze	7^{7}	6^{7}	6^{3}
(Slovakia) K Kučová	6^{4}	7^{9}	7^{7}
Q	(Hungary) A Bondár	5	3
(Germany) T Korpatsch	7	6

Semifinals
(Slovakia) K Kučová	6	6
(Germany) T Korpatsch	0	3

== Qualifying ==
=== Seeds ===
1. (Russia) Marina Melnikova (qualifying competition, lucky loser)
2. (Belgium) Maryna Zanevska (Received special exempt to main draw)
3. (Romania) Gabriela Talabă (first round)
4. (Ukraine) Kateryna Bondarenko (qualified)
5. (Georgia (country)) Ekaterine Gorgodze (qualified)
6. (Croatia) Tereza Mrdeža (qualifying competition, lucky loser)
7. (Hungary) Anna Bondár (qualified)
8. (United States) Jamie Loeb (first round, lucky loser)

=== Qualifiers ===
1. (Hungary) Anna Bondár
2. (Georgia (country)) Ekaterine Gorgodze
3. (Italy) Federica Di Sarra
4. (Ukraine) Kateryna Bondarenko

=== Lucky losers ===
1. (Russia) Marina Melnikova
2. (Russia) Amina Anshba
3. (Croatia) Tereza Mrdeža
4. (Poland) Weronika Falkowska
5. (United States) Jamie Loeb
6. (Russia) Anastasia Zakharova

=== Draw ===
==== First qualifier ====
First round
1	(Russia) Marina Melnikova	6	2
(Kazakhstan) Anna Danilina	1	0^{r}
(Switzerland) Conny Perrin	2	6	2
7	(Hungary) Anna Bondár	6	4	6

Qualifying competition
1	(Russia) Marina Melnikova	3	6	2
7	(Hungary) Anna Bondár	6	4	6

==== Second qualifier ====
First round
Alt	(Uzbekistan) Akgul Amanmuradova	4	4
(Russia) Amina Anshba	6	6
WC	(Poland) Martyna Kubka	1	2
5	(Georgia (country)) Ekaterine Gorgodze	6	6

Qualifying competition
(Russia) Amina Anshba	0	2
5	(Georgia (country)) Ekaterine Gorgodze	6	6

==== Third qualifier ====
First round
3	(Romania) Gabriela Talabă	4	3
(Italy) Federica Di Sarra	6	6
(Russia) Varvara Flink	2	5
6	(Croatia) Tereza Mrdeža	6	7

Qualifying competition
(Italy) Federica Di Sarra	6	7
6	(Croatia) Tereza Mrdeža	4	5

==== Fourth qualifier ====
First round
4	(Ukraine) Kateryna Bondarenko	6	6
(Russia) Anastasia Zakharova	2	4
WC	(Poland) Weronika Falkowska	7^{7}	6
8	(United States) Jamie Loeb	6^{3}	3

Qualifying competition
4	(Ukraine) Kateryna Bondarenko	6	7^{7}
WC	(Poland) Weronika Falkowska	3	6^{3}
