= 2015 Internationaux Féminins de la Vienne – Doubles =

Doubles
- 2015 Internationaux Féminins de la Vienne

Final
- Champions: (Romania) Andreea Mitu (Romania) Monica Niculescu
- Runners-up: (France) Stéphanie Foretz (France) Amandine Hesse
- Score: 6–7^{(5–7)}, 7–6^{(7–2)}, [10–8]

Events
Singles	Doubles
← 2014 ·	Internationaux Féminins de la Vienne	· 2016 →

Andrea Hlaváčková and Lucie Hradecká were the defending champions, but chose to participate at the 2015 WTA Finals instead.

Andreea Mitu and Monica Niculescu won the title, defeating Stéphanie Foretz and Amandine Hesse in the final, 6–7^{(5–7)}, 7–6^{(7–2)}, [10–8].

== Seeds ==
1. (Switzerland) Xenia Knoll / (United Kingdom) Jocelyn Rae (first round)
2. (Romania) Andreea Mitu / (Romania) Monica Niculescu (champions)
3. (France) Stéphanie Foretz / (France) Amandine Hesse (final)
4. (Georgia (country)) Sofia Shapatava / (Ukraine) Anastasiya Vasylyeva (quarterfinals)

== Draw ==
=== Key ===
- Q = Qualifier
- WC = Wild card
- LL = Lucky loser
- Alt = Alternate
- SE = Special exempt
- PR = Protected ranking
- ITF = ITF entry
- JE = Junior exempt
- w/o = Walkover
- r = Retired
- d = Defaulted
- SR = Special ranking

=== Draw ===
First round
1	(Switzerland) X Knoll (United Kingdom) J Rae	3	6	[6]
(Russia) P Monova (Switzerland) J Teichmann	6	3	[10]
(France) J Coin (France) P Parmentier	3	7	[10]
(United Kingdom) T Moore (Switzerland) C Perrin	6	5	[8]
3	(France) S Foretz (France) A Hesse	4	6	[10]
(France) M Johansson (France) A Lim	6	4	[2]
(Germany) A Beck (Germany) C Witthöft	6	7^{7}
(Argentina) T Búa (Romania) D Buzean	4	6^{5}
(Georgia (country)) O Kalashnikova (Hungary) K Marosi	7^{8}	4	[9]
(Russia) V Solovyeva (Ukraine) M Zanevska	6^{6}	6	[11]
(Czech Republic) L Kunčíková (Czech Republic) K Stuchlá	5	4
4	(Georgia (country)) S Shapatava (Ukraine) A Vasylyeva	7	6
(United States) L Chirico (Austria) T Paszek	3	6	[8]
WC	(Uzbekistan) N Abduraimova (France) M Partaud	6	3	[10]
(Ukraine) A Kalinina (Belgium) A-S Mestach	3	3
2	(Romania) A Mitu (Romania) M Niculescu	6	6

Quarterfinals
(Russia) P Monova (Switzerland) J Teichmann	5	4
(France) J Coin (France) P Parmentier	7	6
3	(France) S Foretz (France) A Hesse	5	7^{7}	[10]
(Germany) A Beck (Germany) C Witthöft	7	6^{5}	[5]
(Russia) V Solovyeva (Ukraine) M Zanevska	6	7
4	(Georgia (country)) S Shapatava (Ukraine) A Vasylyeva	2	5
WC	(Uzbekistan) N Abduraimova (France) M Partaud	1	3
2	(Romania) A Mitu (Romania) M Niculescu	6	6

Semifinals
(France) J Coin (France) P Parmentier	3	6	[8]
3	(France) S Foretz (France) A Hesse	6	4	[10]
(Russia) V Solovyeva (Ukraine) M Zanevska	1	2
2	(Romania) A Mitu (Romania) M Niculescu	6	6

Final
3	(France) S Foretz (France) A Hesse	7^{7}	6^{2}	[8]
2	(Romania) A Mitu (Romania) M Niculescu	6^{5}	7^{7}	[10]
