= 2015 Internationaux Féminins de la Vienne – Singles =

Singles
- 2015 Internationaux Féminins de la Vienne

Final
- Champion: (Romania) Monica Niculescu
- Runner-up: (France) Pauline Parmentier
- Score: 7–5, 6–2

Events
Singles	Doubles
← 2014 ·	Internationaux Féminins de la Vienne	· 2016 →

Tímea Babos was the defending champion, but chose to participate at the 2015 WTA Finals instead.

Monica Niculescu won the title, defeating Pauline Parmentier in the final, 7–5, 6–2.

== Seeds ==
1. (Romania) Monica Niculescu
2. (Germany) Annika Beck (second round)
3. (Germany) Carina Witthöft (quarterfinals)
4. (Czech Republic) Tereza Smitková (first round)
5. (Romania) Andreea Mitu (first round)
6. (Belgium) Kirsten Flipkens (second round)
7. (Belarus) Aliaksandra Sasnovich (first round)
8. (Netherlands) Kiki Bertens (quarterfinals)

== Draw ==
=== Key ===
- Q = Qualifier
- WC = Wild card
- LL = Lucky loser
- Alt = Alternate
- SE = Special exempt
- PR = Protected ranking
- ITF = ITF entry
- JE = Junior exempt
- w/o = Walkover
- r = Retired
- d = Defaulted
- SR = Special ranking

=== Finals ===
Semifinals
1	(Romania) Monica Niculescu	6	6
(Ukraine) Kateryna Kozlova	2	1
(France) Pauline Parmentier	6	6
Q	(Austria) Tamira Paszek	3	4

Final
1	(Romania) Monica Niculescu	7	6
(France) Pauline Parmentier	5	2

=== Top half ===
First round
1	(Romania) M Niculescu	6	6
(Spain) MT Torró Flor	3	2
(France) O Dodin	3	6	6
(Czech Republic) Kr Plíšková	6	4	4
(Ukraine) A Kalinina	6	5	6
WC	(France) J Coin	4	7	1
(Ukraine) M Zanevska	4	3
8	(Netherlands) K Bertens	6	6
3	(Germany) C Witthöft	6	2	7
(United States) L Chirico	3	6	5
Q	(Switzerland) C Perrin	5	4
(Japan) K Date-Krumm	7	6
(Netherlands) R Hogenkamp	6^{3}	3
Q	(Russia) E Alexandrova	7^{7}	6
(Ukraine) K Kozlova	6	5	6
5	(Romania) A Mitu	0	7	3

Second round
1	(Romania) M Niculescu	6	7
(France) O Dodin	2	5
(Ukraine) A Kalinina	4	4
8	(Netherlands) K Bertens	6	6
3	(Germany) C Witthöft	7	7
(Japan) K Date-Krumm	5	5
Q	(Russia) E Alexandrova	3	7	5
(Ukraine) K Kozlova	6	5	7

Quarterfinals
1	(Romania) M Niculescu	5	6	7
8	(Netherlands) K Bertens	7	0	5
3	(Germany) C Witthöft	1	6^{5}
(Ukraine) K Kozlova	6	7^{7}

Semifinals
1	(Romania) M Niculescu	6	6
(Ukraine) K Kozlova	2	1

=== Bottom half ===
First round
6	(Belgium) K Flipkens	7	7
Q	(United States) B Pera	5	5
WC	(France) A Hesse	0	3
(Switzerland) S Vögele	6	6
(France) P Parmentier	6	6
(Spain) S Soler Espinosa	4	4
(Italy) F Schiavone	6	7^{8}
4	(Czech Republic) T Smitková	4	6^{6}
7	(Belarus) A Sasnovich	3	1
(Croatia) D Vekić	6	6
(Belgium) A-S Mestach	6	6
LL	(Italy) M Caregaro	2	2
Q	(Austria) T Paszek	6	6
WC	(France) A Lim	3	4
WC	(France) M Johansson	4	6	5
2	(Germany) A Beck	6	4	7

Second round
6	(Belgium) K Flipkens	1	6	0
(Switzerland) S Vögele	6	3	6
(France) P Parmentier	7^{7}	6
(Italy) F Schiavone	6^{2}	2
(Croatia) D Vekić	6	7
(Belgium) A-S Mestach	4	5
Q	(Austria) T Paszek	6	3	6
2	(Germany) A Beck	2	6	4

Quarterfinals
(Switzerland) S Vögele	1	4
(France) P Parmentier	6	6
(Croatia) D Vekić	6	2	4
Q	(Austria) T Paszek	4	6	6

Semifinals
(France) P Parmentier	6	6
Q	(Austria) T Paszek	3	4
