= 2014 Internationaux Féminins de la Vienne =

- Date: 20–26 October
- Edition: 18th
- Category: ITF Women's Circuit
- Prize money: $100,000
- Surface: Hard (indoor)
- Location: Poitiers, France

Champions

Singles
- (Hungary) Tímea Babos

Doubles
- (Czech Republic) Andrea Hlaváčková / (Czech Republic) Lucie Hradecká
← 2013 ·	Internationaux Féminins de la Vienne	· 2015 →

The 2014 Internationaux Féminins de la Vienne was a professional tennis tournament played on indoor hard courts. It was the 18th edition of the tournament which was part of the 2014 ITF Women's Circuit, offering a total of $100,000 in prize money. It took place in Poitiers, France, on 20–26 October 2014.

== Singles main draw entrants ==
=== Seeds ===
Country	Player	Rank^{1}	Seed
SUI	Timea Bacsinszky	50	1
GER	Annika Beck	60	2
SUI	Stefanie Vögele	69	3
SVK	Anna Karolína Schmiedlová	72	4
GER	Julia Görges	74	5
FRA	Pauline Parmentier	78	6
BEL	Alison Van Uytvanck	79	7
CZE	Tereza Smitková	84	8

- ^{1} Rankings as of 13 October 2014

=== Other entrants ===
The following players received wildcards into the singles main draw:

- (France) Océane Dodin
- (France) Amandine Hesse
- (France) Mathilde Johansson
- (France) Virginie Razzano

The following players received entry from the qualifying draw:

- (Ukraine) Yuliya Beygelzimer
- (Tunisia) Ons Jabeur
- (Ukraine) Nadiia Kichenok
- (Switzerland) Xenia Knoll

== Champions ==
=== Singles ===
- (Hungary) Tímea Babos def. (France) Océane Dodin 6–3, 4–6, 7–5

=== Doubles ===
- (Czech Republic) Andrea Hlaváčková / (Czech Republic) Lucie Hradecká def. (Poland) Katarzyna Piter / (Ukraine) Maryna Zanevska 6–1, 7–5
