= 2022 Polish Open – Doubles =

Doubles
- 2022 Polish Open

Final
- Champions: (United Kingdom) Alicia Barnett (United Kingdom) Olivia Nicholls
- Runners-up: (Germany) Vivian Heisen (Poland) Katarzyna Kawa
- Score: 6–1, 7–6^{(7–3)}

Events
Singles	Doubles
← 2021 ·	Kozerki Open	· 2023 →

Bárbara Gatica and Rebeca Pereira were the defending champions but Gatica had been provisionally suspended for doping since June 2022, whilst Pereira chose not to participate.

Alicia Barnett and Olivia Nicholls won the title, defeating Vivian Heisen and Katarzyna Kawa in the final, 6–1, 7–6^{(7–3)}.

== Seeds ==
1. (Germany) Vivian Heisen / (Poland) Katarzyna Kawa (final)
2. (United Kingdom) Alicia Barnett / (United Kingdom) Olivia Nicholls (champions)
3. (France) Estelle Cascino / (France) Jessika Ponchet (semifinals)
4. (Poland) Paula Kania-Choduń / (Czech Republic) Renata Voráčová (semifinals)

== Draw ==
=== Key ===
- Q = Qualifier
- WC = Wild card
- LL = Lucky loser
- Alt = Alternate
- SE = Special exempt
- PR = Protected ranking
- ITF = ITF entry
- JE = Junior exempt
- w/o = Walkover
- r = Retired
- d = Defaulted
- SR = Special ranking

=== Draw ===
First round
1	(Germany) V Heisen (Poland) K Kawa	6	6
WC	(Poland) Z Frankowska (Poland) O Lincer	2	3
(Hungary) T Babos; V Savinykh	6	6
(Uzbekistan) N Abduraimova; A Kubareva	2	4
4	(Poland) P Kania-Choduń (Czech Republic) R Voráčová	7	3	[10]
(Poland) A Hertel (Poland) M Kubka	5	6	[7]
(Japan) F Kozaki (Colombia) Y Lizarazo	6^{5}	3
E Yashina (China) X You	7^{7}	6
(Slovakia) V Kužmová (Belgium) Y Wickmayer	3	6	[9]
V Lapko (Serbia) N Stevanović	6	4	[11]
(Netherlands) I Haverlag (Australia) Z Hives	3	3
3	(France) E Cascino (France) J Ponchet	6	6
WC	(Poland) M Podlińska (Poland) W Rutkowska	2	1
(Poland) W Falkowska (India) A Raina	6	6
WC	V Olianovskaia (Poland) S Rogozińska Dzik	6	3	[5]
2	(United Kingdom) A Barnett (United Kingdom) O Nicholls	4	6	[10]

Quarterfinals
1	(Germany) V Heisen (Poland) K Kawa	6	6
(Hungary) T Babos; V Savinykh	3	4
4	(Poland) P Kania-Choduń (Czech Republic) R Voráčová	6	4	[10]
E Yashina (China) X You	4	6	[7]
V Lapko (Serbia) N Stevanović	1	7^{7}	[10]
3	(France) E Cascino (France) J Ponchet	6	6^{1}	[12]
(Poland) W Falkowska (India) A Raina	3	3
2	(United Kingdom) A Barnett (United Kingdom) O Nicholls	6	6

Semifinals
1	(Germany) V Heisen (Poland) K Kawa	6	6
4	(Poland) P Kania-Choduń (Czech Republic) R Voráčová	2	4
3	(France) E Cascino (France) J Ponchet	2	3
2	(United Kingdom) A Barnett (United Kingdom) O Nicholls	6	6

Final
1	(Germany) V Heisen (Poland) K Kawa	1	6^{3}
2	(United Kingdom) A Barnett (United Kingdom) O Nicholls	6	7^{7}
