= 2013 Trabzon Cup (1) – Singles =

Singles
- 2013 Trabzon Cup (1)

Final
- Champion: (Serbia) Aleksandra Krunić
- Runner-up: (France) Stéphanie Foretz Gacon
- Score: 1–6, 6–4, 6–3

Events
Singles	Doubles
- Trabzon Cup (1)

This was a new event on the 2013 ITF Women's Circuit.

Aleksandra Krunić won the title, defeating Stéphanie Foretz Gacon in the final, 1–6, 6–4, 6–3.

== Seeds ==
1. (Germany) Dinah Pfizenmaier (quarterfinals)
2. (Ukraine) Maryna Zanevska (quarterfinals)
3. (Slovenia) Tadeja Majerič (second round)
4. (Czech Republic) Kristýna Plíšková (quarterfinals)
5. (Russia) Nina Bratchikova (second round)
6. (Russia) Ekaterina Bychkova (second round)
7. (Poland) Magda Linette (first round)
8. (Serbia) Aleksandra Krunić (champion)

== Main draw ==
Key

- Q = Qualifier
- WC = Wild card
- LL = Lucky loser
- Alt = Alternate
- ITF = ITF entry
- PR = Protected ranking
- SR = Special ranking
- SE = Special exempt
- JE = Junior exempt
- JR = Junior Accelerator Programme entrant
- CO = College Accelerator Programme entrant
- NG = Next Gen Accelerator Program entrant
- w/o = Walkover
- r = Retired
- d = Defaulted

=== Finals ===
Semifinals
(Belgium) An-Sophie Mestach	3	0
8	(Serbia) Aleksandra Krunić	6	6
(United Kingdom) Samantha Murray	3	4
(France) Stéphanie Foretz Gacon	6	6

Final
8	(Serbia) Aleksandra Krunić	1	6	6
(France) Stéphanie Foretz Gacon	6	4	3

=== Top half ===
First round
1/WC	(Germany) D Pfizenmaier	7^{7}	6
(Turkey) P Özgen	6^{3}	3
(Croatia) A Vrljić	7^{7}	6
(United Kingdom) N Broady	6^{5}	3
Q	(Germany) C Shakovets	7^{8}	6
WC	(Turkey) N Karagöz	6^{6}	2
(Belgium) A-S Mestach	6	6
7	(Poland) M Linette	2	2
4	(Czech Republic) Kr Plíšková	6	6
Q	(Turkey) M Sezer	2	2
(Croatia) A Savić	6	6
WC	(Turkey) E Tomey	1	2
(Serbia) B Bonić	4	6	6
(Spain) N Párrizas Díaz	6	4	0
(Ukraine) Y Beygelzimer	2	6	4
8	(Serbia) A Krunić	6	4	6

Second round
1/WC	(Germany) D Pfizenmaier	6	6
(Croatia) A Vrljić	4	3
Q	(Germany) C Shakovets	3	1
(Belgium) A-S Mestach	6	6
4	(Czech Republic) Kr Plíšková	7^{7}	3	6
(Croatia) A Savić	6^{2}	6	2
(Serbia) B Bonić	4	2
8	(Serbia) A Krunić	6	6

Quarterfinals
1	(Germany) D Pfizenmaier	1	4
(Belgium) A-S Mestach	6	6
4	(Czech Republic) Kr Plíšková	7	4	3
8	(Serbia) A Krunić	5	6	6

Semifinals
(Belgium) A-S Mestach	3	0
8	(Serbia) A Krunić	6	6

=== Bottom half ===
First round
5	(Russia) N Bratchikova	6	3	6
LL	(Italy) C Coppola	2	6	0
(Romania) A Mitu	6	1	7^{7}
(Germany) A-L Friedsam	1	6	6^{5}
(United Kingdom) S Murray	6	6
(Russia) V Savinykh	3	3
Q	(United Kingdom) E Webley-Smith	2	6^{4}
3	(Slovenia) T Majerič	6	7^{7}
6	(Russia) E Bychkova	6	6
(Slovenia) D Jakupović	1	4
Q	(Russia) E Yashina	3	2
(France) S Foretz Gacon	6	6
WC	(Turkey) C Anıl	3	3
(Italy) A Moratelli	6	6
LL	(Armenia) A Amiraghyan	4	4
2	(Ukraine) M Zanevska	6	6

Second round
5	(Russia) N Bratchikova	1	2
(Romania) A Mitu	6	6
(United Kingdom) S Murray	6	6
3	(Slovenia) T Majerič	1	2
6	(Russia) E Bychkova	6^{3}	4
(France) S Foretz Gacon	7^{7}	6
(Italy) A Moratelli	3	2
2	(Ukraine) M Zanevska	6	6

Quarterfinals
(Romania) A Mitu	2	2
(United Kingdom) S Murray	6	6
(France) S Foretz Gacon	6	6
2	(Ukraine) M Zanevska	4	2

Semifinals
(United Kingdom) S Murray	3	4
(France) S Foretz Gacon	6	6
