= 2014 Internationaux Féminins de la Vienne – Singles =

Singles
- 2014 Internationaux Féminins de la Vienne

Final
- Champion: (Hungary) Tímea Babos
- Runner-up: (France) Océane Dodin
- Score: 6–3, 4–6, 7–5

Events
Singles	Doubles
← 2013 ·	Internationaux Féminins de la Vienne	· 2015 →

Aliaksandra Sasnovich was the defending champion, but lost in the quarterfinals to Tímea Babos.

Babos went on to win the tournament, defeating Océane Dodin in the final, 6–3, 4–6, 7–5.

== Seeds ==
1. (Switzerland) Timea Bacsinszky (quarterfinals)
2. (Germany) Annika Beck (second round)
3. (Switzerland) Stefanie Vögele (first round)
4. (Slovakia) Anna Karolína Schmiedlová (second round)
5. (Germany) Julia Görges (first round)
6. (France) Pauline Parmentier (first round)
7. (Belgium) Alison Van Uytvanck (first round)
8. (Czech Republic) Tereza Smitková (semifinals)

== Main draw ==
=== Key ===
- Q = Qualifier
- WC = Wild card
- LL = Lucky loser
- Alt = Alternate
- SE = Special exempt
- PR = Protected ranking
- ITF = ITF entry
- JE = Junior exempt
- w/o = Walkover
- r = Retired
- d = Defaulted
- SR = Special ranking

=== Finals ===
Semifinals
(Croatia) Ana Konjuh	6	2	3
(Hungary) Tímea Babos	4	6	6
WC	(France) Océane Dodin	6	6
8	(Czech Republic) Tereza Smitková	4	4

Final
(Hungary) Tímea Babos	6	4	7
WC	(France) Océane Dodin	3	6	5

=== Top half ===
First round
1	(Switzerland) T Bacsinszky	6	6
(Kazakhstan) Y Putintseva	3	0
(Germany) C Witthöft	6	6
(United Kingdom) N Broady	1	0
(Czech Republic) Kr Plíšková	6^{0}	3
(Croatia) A Konjuh	7^{7}	6
Q	(Switzerland) X Knoll	6	4	6
7	(Belgium) A Van Uytvanck	4	6	4
3	(Switzerland) S Vögele	2	4
(Belarus) A Sasnovich	6	6
WC	(France) M Johansson	6^{2}	6	6
Q	(Ukraine) N Kichenok	7^{7}	2	4
Q	(Ukraine) Y Beygelzimer	6^{5}	4
WC	(France) A Hesse	7^{7}	6
(Hungary) T Babos	6	6
6	(France) P Parmentier	3	2

Second round
1	(Switzerland) T Bacsinszky	6	6
(Germany) C Witthöft	3	2
(Croatia) A Konjuh	6	6
Q	(Switzerland) X Knoll	4	4
(Belarus) A Sasnovich	0	6	6
WC	(France) M Johansson	6	4	4
WC	(France) A Hesse	4	4
(Hungary) T Babos	6	6

Quarterfinals
1	(Switzerland) T Bacsinszky	4	6^{3}
(Croatia) A Konjuh	6	7^{7}
(Belarus) A Sasnovich	7^{7}	2	6^{8}
(Hungary) T Babos	6^{3}	6	7^{10}

Semifinals
(Croatia) A Konjuh	6	2	3
(Hungary) T Babos	4	6	6

=== Bottom half ===
First round
5	(Germany) J Görges	6	4	3
(Romania) A Mitu	1	6	6
Q	(Tunisia) O Jabeur	2	3
WC	(France) V Razzano	6	6
WC	(France) O Dodin	6	6
(Ukraine) M Zanevska	4	4
(Poland) K Piter	5	2
4	(Slovakia) AK Schmiedlová	7	6
8	(Czech Republic) T Smitková	4	7^{7}	6
(France) C Feuerstein	6	6^{5}	0
(Romania) A Dulgheru	6	6
(Uzbekistan) N Abduraimova	2	3
(Montenegro) D Kovinić	4	4
(Sweden) J Larsson	6	6
(Czech Republic) L Hradecká	5	3
2	(Germany) A Beck	7	6

Second round
(Romania) A Mitu	3	7	6
WC	(France) V Razzano	6	5	1
WC	(France) O Dodin	4	6	6
4	(Slovakia) AK Schmiedlová	6	2	1
8	(Czech Republic) T Smitková	6	6
(Romania) A Dulgheru	2	0
(Sweden) J Larsson	6	6
2	(Germany) A Beck	1	4

Quarterfinals
(Romania) A Mitu	3	3
WC	(France) O Dodin	6	6
8	(Czech Republic) T Smitková	6	6
(Sweden) J Larsson	2	0

Semifinals
WC	(France) O Dodin	6	6
8	(Czech Republic) T Smitková	4	4
