= 2022 Polish Open – Singles =

Singles
- 2022 Polish Open

Final
- Champion: (Czech Republic) Kateřina Siniaková
- Runner-up: (Poland) Magda Linette
- Score: 6–4, 6–1

Events
Singles	Doubles
← 2021 ·	Kozerki Open	· 2023 →

Ekaterine Gorgodze was the defending champion but chose not to participate.

Kateřina Siniaková won the title, defeating Magda Linette in the final, 6–4, 6–1.

== Seeds ==
All seeds receive a bye into the second round.

1. (Poland) Magda Linette (final)
2. (Poland) Magdalena Fręch (second round)
3. (Czech Republic) Kateřina Siniaková (champion)
4. (Bulgaria) Viktoriya Tomova (semifinals)
5. (Czech Republic) Linda Nosková (third round)
6. (Ukraine) Daria Snigur (withdrew)
7. (Poland) Katarzyna Kawa (quarterfinals)
8. (France) Jessika Ponchet (second round)
9. (Uzbekistan) Nigina Abduraimova (quarterfinals)
10. (Slovakia) Viktória Kužmová (quarterfinals)
11. (United Kingdom) Yuriko Miyazaki (second round)
12. (Serbia) Natalija Stevanović (semifinals)
13. (North Macedonia) Lina Gjorcheska (second round)
14. (Germany) Katharina Hobgarski (third round)
15. (Slovakia) Rebecca Šramková (second round)
16. (Croatia) Jana Fett (third round)

== Draw ==
=== Key ===
- Q = Qualifier
- WC = Wild card
- LL = Lucky loser
- Alt = Alternate
- SE = Special exempt
- PR = Protected ranking
- ITF = ITF entry
- JE = Junior exempt
- w/o = Walkover
- r = Retired
- d = Defaulted
- SR = Special ranking

=== Finals ===
Quarterfinals
1	(Poland) Magda Linette	6	6
10	(Slovakia) Viktória Kužmová	3	1
4	(Bulgaria) Viktoriya Tomova	6	6
7	(Poland) Katarzyna Kawa	3	1
9	(Uzbekistan) Nigina Abduraimova	2	2
3	(Czech Republic) Kateřina Siniaková	6	6
12	(Serbia) Natalija Stevanović	6	6
Q	Kristina Dmitruk	0	1

Semifinals
1	(Poland) Magda Linette	6	6
4	(Bulgaria) Viktoriya Tomova	3	1
3	(Czech Republic) Kateřina Siniaková	6	6
12	(Serbia) Natalija Stevanović	0	2

Final
1	(Poland) Magda Linette	4	1
3	(Czech Republic) Kateřina Siniaková	6	6

=== Top half ===
==== Section 1 ====
First round
PR	(Belgium) Y Wickmayer	6^{6}	6	6
(France) E Cascino	7^{8}	0	3
Q	(Poland) S Rogozińska Dzik	6	6
Q	(Czech Republic) N Břečková	2	4
(India) A Raina	6	1	6^{5}
(China) X You	3	6	7^{7}
(Poland) U Radwańska	4	3
E Yashina	6	6

Second round
1	(Poland) M Linette	7^{7}	7
PR	(Belgium) Y Wickmayer	6^{5}	5
Q	(Poland) S Rogozińska Dzik	6	6
15	(Slovakia) R Šramková	4	2
10	(Slovakia) V Kužmová	6	6
(China) X You	3	1
E Yashina	6	6
LL	(United States) A Zhu	4	4

Third round
1	(Poland) M Linette	6	6
Q	(Poland) S Rogozińska Dzik	1	1
10	(Slovakia) V Kužmová	6	7
E Yashina	0	5

Quarterfinals
1	(Poland) M Linette	6	6
10	(Slovakia) V Kužmová	3	1

==== Section 2 ====
First round
Q	(Czech Republic) L Pulchartová	3	5
WC	(Czech Republic) L Havlíčková	6	7
(Philippines) A Eala	6	6
Q	(Slovakia) L Svatíková	4	4
(Colombia) Y Lizarazo	6	6
V Lapko	3	4
Q	(United Kingdom) A Barnett	6^{2}	6^{5}
(Italy) C Rosatello	7^{7}	7^{7}

Second round
4	(Bulgaria) V Tomova	6	1	6
WC	(Czech Republic) L Havlíčková	4	6	2
(Philippines) A Eala	4	3
14	(Germany) K Hobgarski	6	6
11	(United Kingdom) Y Miyazaki	4	3
(Colombia) Y Lizarazo	6	6
(Italy) C Rosatello	5	1
7	(Poland) K Kawa	7	6

Third round
4	(Bulgaria) V Tomova	6	6
14	(Germany) K Hobgarski	1	0
(Colombia) Y Lizarazo	2	2
7	(Poland) K Kawa	6	6

Quarterfinals
4	(Bulgaria) V Tomova	6	6
7	(Poland) K Kawa	3	1

=== Bottom half ===
==== Section 3 ====
First round
(Poland) W Falkowska	6	6
Q	(Poland) O Lincer	4	0
WC	(Poland) A Hertel	4	2
V Savinykh	6	6
J Kolodynska	4	2
WC	(Poland) M Kubka	6	6
(Israel) S Kimchi	2	3
A Kubareva	6	6

Second round
5	(Czech Republic) L Nosková	6	3	6
(Poland) W Falkowska	2	6	4
V Savinykh	3	4
9	(Uzbekistan) N Abduraimova	6	6
13	(North Macedonia) L Gjorcheska	6	6^{5}	2
WC	(Poland) M Kubka	4	7^{7}	6
A Kubareva	4	1
3	(Czech Republic) K Siniaková	6	6

Third round
5	(Czech Republic) L Nosková	6	5	3
9	(Uzbekistan) N Abduraimova	3	7	6
WC	(Poland) M Kubka	6	0	2
3	(Czech Republic) K Siniaková	1	6	6

Quarterfinals
9	(Uzbekistan) N Abduraimova	2	2
3	(Czech Republic) K Siniaková	6	6

==== Section 4 ====
First round
PR	(Australia) Z Hives	4	1
(Czech Republic) N Bartůňková	6	6
(Czech Republic) T Smitková	6	6
PR	(Australia) K McPhee	2	3
(Hungary) T Babos	6	6
Q	(Lithuania) I Dapkutė	2	2
Q	K Dmitruk	6	6
WC	V Olianovskaia	2	1

Second round
8	(France) J Ponchet	3	6^{7}
(Czech Republic) N Bartůňková	6	7^{9}
(Czech Republic) T Smitková	3	6	2
12	(Serbia) N Stevanović	6	2	6
16	(Croatia) J Fett	6	3
(Hungary) T Babos	3	0^{r}
Q	K Dmitruk	7^{9}	6
2/WC	(Poland) M Fręch	6^{7}	3

Third round
(Czech Republic) N Bartůňková	3	2
12	(Serbia) N Stevanović	6	6
16	(Croatia) J Fett	4	3
Q	K Dmitruk	6	6

Quarterfinals
12	(Serbia) N Stevanović	6	6
Q	K Dmitruk	0	1
