= 2013 Internationaux Féminins de la Vienne – Singles =

Singles
- 2013 Internationaux Féminins de la Vienne

Final
- Champion: (Belarus) Aliaksandra Sasnovich
- Runner-up: (Sweden) Sofia Arvidsson
- Score: 6–1, 5–7, 6–4

Events
Singles	Doubles
← 2012 ·	Internationaux Féminins de la Vienne	· 2014 →

Monica Puig was the defending champion, having won the event in 2012, but decided not to participate this year.

Aliaksandra Sasnovich won the tournament, defeating Sofia Arvidsson in the final, 6–1, 5–7, 6–4.

== Seeds ==
1. (Romania) Monica Niculescu (second round)
2. (Germany) Annika Beck (quarterfinals)
3. (United States) Alison Riske (quarterfinals)
4. (Czech Republic) Karolína Plíšková (first round)
5. (Romania) Alexandra Cadanțu (semifinals)
6. (United States) Christina McHale (first round)
7. (Sweden) Johanna Larsson (first round)
8. (Croatia) Donna Vekić (first round)

== Main draw ==
=== Key ===
- Q = Qualifier
- WC = Wild card
- LL = Lucky loser
- Alt = Alternate
- SE = Special exempt
- PR = Protected ranking
- ITF = ITF entry
- JE = Junior exempt
- w/o = Walkover
- r = Retired
- d = Defaulted
- SR = Special ranking

=== Finals ===
Semifinals
Q	(Belarus) Aliaksandra Sasnovich	6	6
5	(Romania) Alexandra Cadanțu	3	3
(United Kingdom) Heather Watson	4	6	2
(Sweden) Sofia Arvidsson	6	2	6

Final
Q	(Belarus) Aliaksandra Sasnovich	6	5	6
(Sweden) Sofia Arvidsson	1	7	4

=== Top half ===
First round
1	(Romania) M Niculescu	6	6
(Ukraine) N Kichenok	1	3
WC	(France) S Foretz Gacon	2	4
WC	(France) P Parmentier	6	6
LL	(Serbia) T Mirčić	2	2
Q	(Belarus) A Sasnovich	6	6
(Luxembourg) M Minella	6	6
8	(Croatia) D Vekić	4	2
4	(Czech Republic) Ka Plíšková	2	2
WC	(France) J Coin	6	6
Q	(United States) N Melichar	4	4
PR	(Netherlands) M Krajicek	6	6
WC	(Austria) T Paszek	7	0	7^{7}
(United Kingdom) J Konta	5	6	6^{5}
Q	(Ukraine) K Kozlova	4	3
5	(Romania) A Cadanțu	6	6

Second round
1	(Romania) M Niculescu	5	6	4
WC	(France) P Parmentier	7	1	6
Q	(Belarus) A Sasnovich	6	6
(Luxembourg) M Minella	3	1
WC	(France) J Coin	3^{r}
PR	(Netherlands) M Krajicek	3
WC	(Austria) T Paszek	4	3
5	(Romania) A Cadanțu	6	6

Quarterfinals
WC	(France) P Parmentier	2	3
Q	(Belarus) A Sasnovich	6	6
PR	(Netherlands) M Krajicek	4	1
5	(Romania) A Cadanțu	6	6

Semifinals
Q	(Belarus) A Sasnovich	6	6
5	(Romania) A Cadanțu	3	3

=== Bottom half ===
First round
6	(United States) C McHale	6	5	4
(United Kingdom) H Watson	2	7	6
(Croatia) M Lučić-Baroni	2^{r}
(Czech Republic) L Hradecká	3
(Serbia) V Dolonc	3	2
LL	(Canada) S Dubois	6	6
(Kazakhstan) Y Putintseva	2	4
3	(United States) A Riske	6	6
7	(Sweden) J Larsson	6	3	3
(Sweden) S Arvidsson	3	6	6
(Spain) L Arruabarrena	6	6
(Portugal) MJ Koehler	3	2
Q	(Chile) D Seguel	6^{1}	6	7^{7}
(France) V Razzano	7^{7}	3	6^{2}
(France) C Feuerstein	0	2
2	(Germany) A Beck	6	6

Second round
(United Kingdom) H Watson	6	4	6
(Czech Republic) L Hradecká	1	6	4
LL	(Canada) S Dubois	3	1
3	(United States) A Riske	6	6
(Sweden) S Arvidsson	6	6
(Spain) L Arruabarrena	1	3
Q	(Chile) D Seguel	2	1
2	(Germany) A Beck	6	6

Quarterfinals
(United Kingdom) H Watson	3	6	6
3	(United States) A Riske	6	4	4
(Sweden) S Arvidsson	6	3	7
2	(Germany) A Beck	2	6	5

Semifinals
(United Kingdom) H Watson	4	6	2
(Sweden) S Arvidsson	6	2	6
