= 2013 Internationaux Féminins de la Vienne – Doubles =

Doubles
- 2013 Internationaux Féminins de la Vienne

Final
- Champions: (Czech Republic) Lucie Hradecká (Netherlands) Michaëlla Krajicek
- Runners-up: (United States) Christina McHale (Romania) Monica Niculescu
- Score: 7–6^{(7–5)}, 6–2

Events
Singles	Doubles
← 2012 ·	Internationaux Féminins de la Vienne	· 2014 →

Catalina Castaño and Mervana Jugić-Salkić were the defending champions, having won the event in 2012, but both players decided not to participate in 2013.

Lucie Hradecká and Michaëlla Krajicek won the tournament, defeating Christina McHale and Monica Niculescu in the final, 7–6^{(7–5)}, 6–2.

== Seeds ==
1. (Croatia) Mirjana Lučić-Baroni / (Austria) Tamira Paszek (withdrew)
2. (France) Stéphanie Foretz Gacon / (Czech Republic) Eva Hrdinová (quarterfinals)
3. (Czech Republic) Karolína Plíšková / (Czech Republic) Kristýna Plíšková (quarterfinals)
4. (Czech Republic) Lucie Hradecká / (Netherlands) Michaëlla Krajicek (champions)

== Draw ==
=== Key ===
- Q = Qualifier
- WC = Wild card
- LL = Lucky loser
- Alt = Alternate
- SE = Special exempt
- PR = Protected ranking
- ITF = ITF entry
- JE = Junior exempt
- w/o = Walkover
- r = Retired
- d = Defaulted
- SR = Special ranking

First round
Alt	(Brazil) PC Gonçalves (Portugal) MJ Koehler	4	5
WC	(Netherlands) R Hogenkamp (Sweden) J Larsson	6	7
WC	(France) C Feuerstein (Switzerland) V Golubic	2	7^{8}	[6]
(United States) A Riske (Russia) V Savinykh	6	6^{6}	[10]
4	(Czech Republic) L Hradecká (Netherlands) M Krajicek	6	6
(Spain) L Arruabarrena (Romania) A Cadanțu	2	3
(Serbia) V Dolonc (United Kingdom) H Watson	6	6
(United States) N Melichar (Serbia) T Mirčić	0	2
(United States) C McHale (Romania) M Niculescu	6	6
(Ukraine) N Kichenok (Ukraine) K Kozlova	2	4
(United Kingdom) N Slater (United Kingdom) M South	1	6	[4]
3	(Czech Republic) Ka Plíšková (Czech Republic) Kr Plíšková	6	3	[10]
(Belarus) A Sasnovich (Chile) D Seguel	6	6
WC	(Ukraine) A Fomina (Germany) C Shakovets	0	2
(Latvia) L Dekmeijere (Czech Republic) N Fraňková	7	2	[8]
2	(France) S Foretz Gacon (Czech Republic) E Hrdinová	5	6	[10]

Quarterfinals
WC	(Netherlands) R Hogenkamp (Sweden) J Larsson	3	6	[13]
(United States) A Riske (Russia) V Savinykh	6	2	[11]
4	(Czech Republic) L Hradecká (Netherlands) M Krajicek	6	7
(Serbia) V Dolonc (United Kingdom) H Watson	2	5
(United States) C McHale (Romania) M Niculescu	6	6
3	(Czech Republic) Ka Plíšková (Czech Republic) Kr Plíšková	4	1
(Belarus) A Sasnovich (Chile) D Seguel	7	7
2	(France) S Foretz Gacon (Czech Republic) E Hrdinová	5	5

Semifinals
WC	(Netherlands) R Hogenkamp (Sweden) J Larsson	2	1
4	(Czech Republic) L Hradecká (Netherlands) M Krajicek	6	6
(United States) C McHale (Romania) M Niculescu	6	7^{7}
(Belarus) A Sasnovich (Chile) D Seguel	2	6^{2}

Final
4	(Czech Republic) L Hradecká (Netherlands) M Krajicek	7^{7}	6
(United States) C McHale (Romania) M Niculescu	6^{5}	2
