= 2013 Trabzon Cup (2) – Singles =

Singles
- 2013 Trabzon Cup (2)

Final
- Champion: (Germany) Anna-Lena Friedsam
- Runner-up: (Ukraine) Yuliya Beygelzimer
- Score: 4–6, 6–3, 6–3

Events
Singles	Doubles
- Trabzon Cup (2)

This was a new event on the 2013 ITF Women's Circuit.

Anna-Lena Friedsam won the title, defeating Yuliya Beygelzimer in the final, 4–6, 6–3, 6–3.

== Seeds ==
1. (Germany) Dinah Pfizenmaier (second round)
2. (Czech Republic) Kristýna Plíšková (second round)
3. (Russia) Ekaterina Bychkova (quarterfinals)
4. (Poland) Magda Linette (first round)
5. (Serbia) Aleksandra Krunić (semifinals)
6. (Belgium) An-Sophie Mestach (quarterfinals)
7. (Ukraine) Olga Savchuk (second round)
8. (France) Stéphanie Foretz Gacon (first round)

== Main draw ==
Key

- Q = Qualifier
- WC = Wild card
- LL = Lucky loser
- Alt = Alternate
- ITF = ITF entry
- PR = Protected ranking
- SR = Special ranking
- SE = Special exempt
- JE = Junior exempt
- JR = Junior Accelerator Programme entrant
- CO = College Accelerator Programme entrant
- NG = Next Gen Accelerator Program entrant
- w/o = Walkover
- r = Retired
- d = Defaulted

=== Finals ===
Semifinals
(Germany) Anna-Lena Friedsam	7	7^{7}
(Slovenia) Dalila Jakupović	5	6^{2}
5	(Serbia) Aleksandra Krunić	3	3
(Ukraine) Yuliya Beygelzimer	6	6

Final
(Germany) Anna-Lena Friedsam	4	6	6
(Ukraine) Yuliya Beygelzimer	6	3	3

=== Top half ===
First round
1	(Germany) D Pfizenmaier	6	4	6
(Turkey) P Özgen	4	6	2
(Turkey) B Eraydın	3	6	0
(Georgia (country)) O Kalashnikova	6	4	6
(Germany) A-L Friedsam	6	6
(Croatia) A Vrljić	3	3
Q	(Russia) M Shamayko	2	6	6
8	(France) S Foretz Gacon	6	2	4
4	(Poland) M Linette	4	6	3
(Slovenia) D Jakupović	6	1	6
WC	(Turkey) C Anıl	7	6^{11}	4
WC	(Turkey) Ö Boz	5	7^{13}	6
(Turkey) M Sezer	6	6
LL	(Armenia) A Amiraghyan	2	1
(United Kingdom) N Broady	6	6^{4}	3
6	(Belgium) A-S Mestach	3	7^{7}	6

Second round
1	(Germany) D Pfizenmaier	6^{3}	4
(Georgia (country)) O Kalashnikova	7^{7}	6
(Germany) A-L Friedsam	6	6
Q	(Russia) M Shamayko	3	4
(Slovenia) D Jakupović	6	6
WC	(Turkey) Ö Boz	0	0
(Turkey) M Sezer	3	1
6	(Belgium) A-S Mestach	6	6

Quarterfinals
(Georgia (country)) O Kalashnikova	3	1
(Germany) A-L Friedsam	6	6
(Slovenia) D Jakupović	6	7^{7}
6	(Belgium) A-S Mestach	4	6^{0}

Semifinals
(Germany) A-L Friedsam	7	7^{7}
(Slovenia) D Jakupović	5	6^{2}

=== Bottom half ===
First round
5	(Serbia) A Krunić	6	6
WC	(Turkey) Y Akdemir	0	0
WC	(Turkey) D Paykoç	2	0
LL	(Russia) E Yashina	6	6
Q	(Russia) S Saidova	6^{6}	3
(Italy) ME Camerin	7^{8}	6
(Czech Republic) T Smitková	6	3	4
3	(Russia) E Bychkova	3	6	6
7	(Ukraine) O Savchuk	7	6
(Croatia) A Savić	5	1
Q	(Georgia (country)) E Gorgodze	3	2
(Ukraine) Y Beygelzimer	6	6
(Italy) A Moratelli	1	0
(Romania) A Mitu	6	6
Q	(Czech Republic) P Krejsová	1^{r}
2	(Czech Republic) Kr Plíšková	1

Second round
5	(Serbia) A Krunić	6	6
LL	(Russia) E Yashina	1	2
(Italy) ME Camerin	6	3	2
3	(Russia) E Bychkova	4	6	6
7	(Ukraine) O Savchuk	3	2
(Ukraine) Y Beygelzimer	6	6
(Romania) A Mitu	4	6	6
2	(Czech Republic) Kr Plíšková	6	3	4

Quarterfinals
5	(Serbia) A Krunić	2	6	6
3	(Russia) E Bychkova	6	2	1
(Ukraine) Y Beygelzimer	7^{8}	4	6
(Romania) A Mitu	6^{6}	6	3

Semifinals
5	(Serbia) A Krunić	3	3
(Ukraine) Y Beygelzimer	6	6
