= 2013 Trabzon Cup (2) =

- Date: 9–15 September
- Edition: 1st
- Draw: 32S/16D
- Prize money: $50,000
- Surface: Hard
- Location: Trabzon, Turkey

Champions

Singles
- (Germany) Anna-Lena Friedsam

Doubles
- (Georgia (country)) Oksana Kalashnikova / (Serbia) Aleksandra Krunić
- Trabzon Cup (2)

The 2013 Trabzon Cup (2) was a professional tennis tournament played on outdoor hard courts. It was the first edition of the tournament which was part of the 2013 ITF Women's Circuit, offering a total of $50,000 in prize money. It took place in Trabzon, Turkey, on 9–15 September 2013. This event was the second Trabzon Cup of the year, the 2013 Trabzon Cup (1) occurred a week before. This counts as the first tournament of the second Trabzon Cup.

== WTA entrants ==
=== Seeds ===
| Country | Player | Rank^{1} | Seed |
|---|---|---|---|
| GER | Dinah Pfizenmaier | 99 | 1 |
| CZE | Kristýna Plíšková | 131 | 2 |
| RUS | Ekaterina Bychkova | 153 | 3 |
| POL | Magda Linette | 157 | 4 |
| SRB | Aleksandra Krunić | 158 | 5 |
| BEL | An-Sophie Mestach | 162 | 6 |
| UKR | Olga Savchuk | 172 | 7 |
| FRA | Stéphanie Foretz Gacon | 173 | 8 |

- ^{1} Rankings as of 26 August 2013

=== Other entrants ===
The following players received wildcards into the singles main draw:

- (Turkey) Yağmur Akdemir
- (Turkey) Cemre Anıl
- (Turkey) Öykü Boz
- (Turkey) Deniz Paykoç

The following players received entry from the qualifying draw:

- (Georgia (country)) Ekaterine Gorgodze
- (Czech Republic) Petra Krejsová
- (Russia) Shakhlo Saidova
- (Russia) Marina Shamayko

The following players received entry into the singles main draw as lucky losers:

- (Armenia) Ani Amiraghyan
- (Russia) Ekaterina Yashina

== Champions ==
=== Singles ===
- (Germany) Anna-Lena Friedsam def. (Ukraine) Yuliya Beygelzimer 4–6, 6–3, 6–3

=== Doubles ===
- (Georgia (country)) Oksana Kalashnikova / (Serbia) Aleksandra Krunić def. (Armenia) Ani Amiraghyan / (Slovenia) Dalila Jakupović 6–2, 6–1
