= 2013 Internationaux Féminins de la Vienne =

- Date: 21–27 October
- Edition: 17th
- Category: ITF Women's Circuit
- Prize money: $100,000
- Surface: Hard (indoor)
- Location: Poitiers, France

Champions

Singles
- (Belarus) Aliaksandra Sasnovich

Doubles
- (Czech Republic) Lucie Hradecká / (Netherlands) Michaëlla Krajicek
← 2012 ·	Internationaux Féminins de la Vienne	· 2014 →

The 2013 Internationaux Féminins de la Vienne was a professional tennis tournament played on indoor hard courts. It was the seventeenth edition of the tournament which was part of the 2013 ITF Women's Circuit, offering a total of $100,000 in prize money. It took place in Poitiers, France, on 21–27 October 2013.

== WTA entrants ==
=== Seeds ===
Country	Player	Rank^{1}	Seed
ROU	Monica Niculescu	43	1
GER	Annika Beck	57	2
USA	Alison Riske	58	3
CZE	Karolína Plíšková	66	4
ROU	Alexandra Cadanțu	67	5
USA	Christina McHale	71	6
SWE	Johanna Larsson	84	7
CRO	Donna Vekić	86	8

- ^{1} Rankings as of 14 October 2013

=== Other entrants ===
The following players received wildcards into the singles main draw:

- (France) Julie Coin
- (France) Stéphanie Foretz Gacon
- (France) Pauline Parmentier
- (Austria) Tamira Paszek

The following players received entry from the qualifying draw:

- (Ukraine) Kateryna Kozlova
- (United States) Nicole Melichar
- (Belarus) Aliaksandra Sasnovich
- (Chile) Daniela Seguel

The following players received entry as lucky losers into the singles main draw:

- (Canada) Stéphanie Dubois
- (Serbia) Teodora Mirčić

The following player received entry by a protected ranking:

- (Netherlands) Michaëlla Krajicek

== Champions ==
=== Singles ===
- (Belarus) Aliaksandra Sasnovich def. (Sweden) Sofia Arvidsson 6–1, 5–7, 6–4

=== Doubles ===
- (Czech Republic) Lucie Hradecká / (Netherlands) Michaëlla Krajicek def. (United States) Christina McHale / (Romania) Monica Niculescu 7–6^{(7–5)}, 6–2
