= 2013 Trabzon Cup (2) – Doubles =

Doubles
- 2013 Trabzon Cup (2)

Final
- Champions: (Georgia (country)) Oksana Kalashnikova (Serbia) Aleksandra Krunić
- Runners-up: (Armenia) Ani Amiraghyan (Slovenia) Dalila Jakupović
- Score: 6–2, 6–1

Events
Singles	Doubles
- Trabzon Cup (2)

This was a new event on the 2013 ITF Women's Circuit.

Oksana Kalashnikova and Aleksandra Krunić won the title, defeating Ani Amiraghyan and Dalila Jakupović in the final, 6–2, 6–1.

== Seeds ==
1. (Georgia (country)) Oksana Kalashnikova / (Serbia) Aleksandra Krunić (champions)
2. (France) Stéphanie Foretz Gacon / (United Kingdom) Emily Webley-Smith (semifinals)
3. (United Kingdom) Samantha Murray / (Croatia) Ana Vrljić (first round; withdrew)
4. (Poland) Magda Linette / (Turkey) Pemra Özgen (semifinals)

== Draw ==
Key

- Q = Qualifier
- WC = Wild card
- LL = Lucky loser
- Alt = Alternate
- ITF = ITF entry
- PR = Protected ranking
- SR = Special ranking
- SE = Special exempt
- JE = Junior exempt
- JR = Junior Accelerator Programme entrant
- CO = College Accelerator Programme entrant
- NG = Next Gen Accelerator Program entrant
- w/o = Walkover
- r = Retired
- d = Defaulted

First round
1	(Georgia (country)) O Kalashnikova (Serbia) A Krunić	w/o
WC	(Turkey) Y Akdemir (Turkey) C Anıl
(Russia) E Bychkova (Russia) M Shamayko	6	6
WC	(Romania) A Mitu (Croatia) A Savić	3	4
4	(Poland) M Linette (Turkey) P Özgen	7	6
(Georgia (country)) E Gorgodze (Georgia (country)) S Kvatsabaia	5	1
(Czech Republic) P Krejsová (Czech Republic) T Smitková	0^{r}
WC	(Russia) N Orlova (Romania) I Truca	2
(Armenia) A Amiraghyan (Slovenia) D Jakupović	6	6
(Turkey) M Sezer (Russia) E Yashina	4	3
(Italy) C Coppola (Italy) A Moratelli	w/o
3	(United Kingdom) S Murray (Croatia) A Vrljić
(United Kingdom) N Broady (Germany) J Steinherr	3	4
(Turkey) B Eraydın (Slovenia) A Prislan	6	6
(Ukraine) A Fomina (Germany) C Shakovets	6	1	[5]
2	(France) S Foretz Gacon (United Kingdom) E Webley-Smith	3	6	[10]

Quarterfinals
1	(Georgia (country)) O Kalashnikova (Serbia) A Krunić	6	4	[10]
(Russia) E Bychkova (Russia) M Shamayko	1	6	[6]
4	(Poland) M Linette (Turkey) P Özgen	6	6
WC	(Russia) N Orlova (Romania) I Truca	1	4
(Armenia) A Amiraghyan (Slovenia) D Jakupović	6	6
(Italy) C Coppola (Italy) A Moratelli	1	1
(Turkey) B Eraydın (Slovenia) A Prislan	7^{7}	2	[7]
2	(France) S Foretz Gacon (United Kingdom) E Webley-Smith	6^{4}	6	[10]

Semifinals
1	(Georgia (country)) O Kalashnikova (Serbia) A Krunić	6	6
4	(Poland) M Linette (Turkey) P Özgen	1	1
(Armenia) A Amiraghyan (Slovenia) D Jakupović	6	6
2	(France) S Foretz Gacon (United Kingdom) E Webley-Smith	3	3

Final
1	(Georgia (country)) O Kalashnikova (Serbia) A Krunić	6	6
(Armenia) A Amiraghyan (Slovenia) D Jakupović	2	1
