= 2013 Trabzon Cup (1) – Doubles =

Doubles
- 2013 Trabzon Cup (1)

Final
- Champions: (Ukraine) Yuliya Beygelzimer (Ukraine) Maryna Zanevska
- Runners-up: (Ukraine) Alona Fomina (Germany) Christina Shakovets
- Score: 6–3, 6–1

Events
Singles	Doubles
- Trabzon Cup (1)

This was a new event on the 2013 ITF Women's Circuit.

Yuliya Beygelzimer and Maryna Zanevska won the title, defeating Alona Fomina and Christina Shakovets in the final 6–3, 6–1.

== Seeds ==
1. (France) Stéphanie Foretz Gacon / (United Kingdom) Emily Webley-Smith (semifinals)
2. (United Kingdom) Naomi Broady / (Czech Republic) Kristýna Plíšková (quarterfinals)
3. (Ukraine) Yuliya Beygelzimer / (Ukraine) Maryna Zanevska (champions)
4. (United Kingdom) Samantha Murray / (Croatia) Ana Vrljić (semifinals)

== Draw ==
Key

- Q = Qualifier
- WC = Wild card
- LL = Lucky loser
- Alt = Alternate
- ITF = ITF entry
- PR = Protected ranking
- SR = Special ranking
- SE = Special exempt
- JE = Junior exempt
- JR = Junior Accelerator Programme entrant
- CO = College Accelerator Programme entrant
- NG = Next Gen Accelerator Program entrant
- w/o = Walkover
- r = Retired
- d = Defaulted

First round
1	(France) S Foretz Gacon (United Kingdom) E Webley-Smith	6	0
(Germany) A-L Friedsam (Slovenia) T Majerič	4	0^{r}
(Italy) C Coppola (Italy) A Moratelli	6	6
(Russia) N Gorbachkova (Russia) A Rafikova	3	3
3	(Ukraine) Y Beygelzimer (Ukraine) M Zanevska	6	6
(Armenia) A Amiraghyan (Georgia (country)) T Chalaganidze	2	2
WC	(Turkey) N Karagöz (Turkey) E Tomey	6	6
(India) S Joon (Romania) I Truca	3	4
(Russia) E Bychkova (Serbia) A Krunić	6	6
(Poland) M Linette (Turkey) P Özgen	1	4
(Ukraine) O Korashvili (Czech Republic) M Přádová	1	4
4	(United Kingdom) S Murray (Croatia) A Vrljić	6	6
(Ukraine) A Fomina (Germany) C Shakovets	6	6
(Slovenia) A Prislan (Russia) E Yashina	1	2
(Romania) A Mitu (Croatia) A Savić	4	4
2	(United Kingdom) N Broady (Czech Republic) Kr Plíšková	6	6

Quarterfinals
1	(France) S Foretz Gacon (United Kingdom) E Webley-Smith	6	3	[10]
(Italy) C Coppola (Italy) A Moratelli	4	6	[3]
3	(Ukraine) Y Beygelzimer (Ukraine) M Zanevska	6	6
WC	(Turkey) N Karagöz (Turkey) E Tomey	0	2
(Russia) E Bychkova (Serbia) A Krunić	1	3
4	(United Kingdom) S Murray (Croatia) A Vrljić	6	6
(Ukraine) A Fomina (Germany) C Shakovets	6	7^{9}
2	(United Kingdom) N Broady (Czech Republic) Kr Plíšková	4	6^{7}

Semifinals
1	(France) S Foretz Gacon (United Kingdom) E Webley-Smith	1	2
3	(Ukraine) Y Beygelzimer (Ukraine) M Zanevska	6	6
4	(United Kingdom) S Murray (Croatia) A Vrljić	4	2
(Ukraine) A Fomina (Germany) C Shakovets	6	6

Final
3	(Ukraine) Y Beygelzimer (Ukraine) M Zanevska	6	6
(Ukraine) A Fomina (Germany) C Shakovets	3	1
