= 2014 Internationaux Féminins de la Vienne – Doubles =

Doubles
- 2014 Internationaux Féminins de la Vienne

Final
- Champions: (Czech Republic) Andrea Hlaváčková (Czech Republic) Lucie Hradecká
- Runners-up: (Poland) Katarzyna Piter (Ukraine) Maryna Zanevska
- Score: 6–1, 7–5

Events
Singles	Doubles
← 2013 ·	Internationaux Féminins de la Vienne	· 2015 →

Lucie Hradecká and Michaëlla Krajicek were the defending champions, however Krajicek chose not to participate. Hradecká paired up with Andrea Hlaváčková as the top seeds and went on to win the tournament, defeating Katarzyna Piter and Maryna Zanevska in the final, 6–1, 7–5.

== Seeds ==
1. (Czech Republic) Andrea Hlaváčková / (Czech Republic) Lucie Hradecká (champions)
2. (Germany) ~~Julia Görges~~ / (Sweden) ~~Johanna Larsson~~ (withdrew)
3. (Ukraine) Lyudmyla Kichenok / (Ukraine) Nadiia Kichenok (quarterfinals)
4. (Ukraine) Yuliya Beygelzimer / (Czech Republic) Eva Hrdinová (semifinals)

== Draw ==
=== Key ===
- Q = Qualifier
- WC = Wild card
- LL = Lucky loser
- Alt = Alternate
- SE = Special exempt
- PR = Protected ranking
- ITF = ITF entry
- JE = Junior exempt
- w/o = Walkover
- r = Retired
- d = Defaulted
- SR = Special ranking

First round
1	(Czech Republic) A Hlaváčková (Czech Republic) L Hradecká	6	6
(France) S Foretz (France) A Hesse	1	1
(Romania) E Bogdan (United States) N Melichar	6	6
(United Kingdom) J Rae (United Kingdom) A Smith	4	3
4	(Ukraine) Y Beygelzimer (Czech Republic) E Hrdinová	6	6
(Uzbekistan) N Abduraimova (Uzbekistan) A Amanmuradova	4	1
WC	(France) A Bacquié (France) F Caramaro	1	0
(Montenegro) D Kovinić (Romania) A Mitu	6	6
(Argentina) T Búa (Chile) D Seguel	4	1
(Poland) K Piter (Ukraine) M Zanevska	6	6
(Belarus) L Marozava (Ukraine) A Vasylyeva	3	0
3	(Ukraine) L Kichenok (Ukraine) N Kichenok	6	6
WC	(Austria) S Klemenschits (Germany) C Witthöft	7	5	[12]
(Italy) G Barbieri (Czech Republic) T Smitková	5	7	[14]
WC	(Romania) A Dulgheru (France) V Razzano	3	3
Alt	(Ukraine) A Kalinina (Latvia) J Ostapenko	6	6

Quarterfinals
1	(Czech Republic) A Hlaváčková (Czech Republic) L Hradecká	6	6
(Romania) E Bogdan (United States) N Melichar	3	1
4	(Ukraine) Y Beygelzimer (Czech Republic) E Hrdinová	6	6
(Montenegro) D Kovinić (Romania) A Mitu	4	4
(Poland) K Piter (Ukraine) M Zanevska	7^{9}	4	[10]
3	(Ukraine) L Kichenok (Ukraine) N Kichenok	6^{7}	6	[5]
(Italy) G Barbieri (Czech Republic) T Smitková	6^{3}	2
Alt	(Ukraine) A Kalinina (Latvia) J Ostapenko	7^{7}	6

Semifinals
1	(Czech Republic) A Hlaváčková (Czech Republic) L Hradecká	7^{7}	6
4	(Ukraine) Y Beygelzimer (Czech Republic) E Hrdinová	6^{3}	1
(Poland) K Piter (Ukraine) M Zanevska	7^{7}	7^{7}
Alt	(Ukraine) A Kalinina (Latvia) J Ostapenko	6^{3}	6^{5}

Final
1	(Czech Republic) A Hlaváčková (Czech Republic) L Hradecká	6	7
(Poland) K Piter (Ukraine) M Zanevska	1	5
