= 2015 Internationaux Féminins de la Vienne =

- Date: 26 October–1 November
- Edition: 19th
- Category: ITF Women's Circuit
- Prize money: $100,000
- Surface: Hard / Indoor
- Location: Poitiers, France

Champions

Singles
- (Romania) Monica Niculescu

Doubles
- (Romania) Andreea Mitu / (Romania) Monica Niculescu
← 2014 ·	Internationaux Féminins de la Vienne	· 2016 →

The 2015 Internationaux Féminins de la Vienne was a professional tennis tournament played on indoor hard courts. It was the nineteenth edition of the tournament and part of the 2015 ITF Women's Circuit, offering a total of $100,000 in prize money. It took place in Poitiers, France, on 26 October–1 November 2015.

== Singles main draw entrants ==
=== Seeds ===
Country	Player	Rank^{1}	Seed
ROU	Monica Niculescu	45	1
GER	Annika Beck	57	2
GER	Carina Witthöft	63	3
CZE	Tereza Smitková	91	4
ROU	Andreea Mitu	93	5
BEL	Kirsten Flipkens	98	6
BLR	Aliaksandra Sasnovich	103	7
NED	Kiki Bertens	105	8

- ^{1} Rankings as of 19 October 2015

=== Other entrants ===
The following players received wildcards into the singles main draw:

- (France) Julie Coin
- (France) Amandine Hesse
- (France) Mathilde Johansson
- (France) Alizé Lim

The following players received entry from the qualifying draw:

- (Russia) Ekaterina Alexandrova
- (Austria) Tamira Paszek
- (United States) Bernarda Pera
- (Switzerland) Conny Perrin

The following player received entry by a lucky loser spot:

- (Italy) Martina Caregaro

== Champions ==
=== Singles ===
- (Romania) Monica Niculescu def. (France) Pauline Parmentier, 7–5, 6–2

=== Doubles ===
- (Romania) Andreea Mitu / (Romania) Monica Niculescu def. (France) Stéphanie Foretz / (France) Amandine Hesse, 6–7^{(5–7)}, 7–6^{(7–2)}, [10–8]
