= Trabzon Cup =

ITF Women's Tour
- Event name: Trabzon Cup
- Location: Trabzon, Turkey
- Venue: Trabzon Gençlik ve Spor İl Müdürlüğü Merkez Kortları
- Category: ITF Women's Circuit
- Surface: Hard
- Draw: 32S/32Q/16D
- Prize money: $50,000

The Trabzon Cup was a tournament for professional female tennis players played on outdoor hardcourts in Trabzon, Turkey. The event was classified as a $50,000 ITF Women's Circuit tournament which took place only in 2013. In the same year there were two Trabzon Cup events, the second came one week after the first.

== Past finals ==
=== Singles ===
Year	Champion	Runner-up	Score
2013 (2)	(Germany) Anna-Lena Friedsam	(Ukraine) Yuliya Beygelzimer	4–6, 6–3, 6–3
2013 (1)	(Serbia) Aleksandra Krunić	(France) Stéphanie Foretz Gacon	1–6, 6–4, 6–3

=== Doubles ===
Year	Champions	Runners-up	Score
2013 (2)	(Georgia (country)) Oksana Kalashnikova (Serbia) Aleksandra Krunić	(Armenia) Ani Amiraghyan (Slovenia) Dalila Jakupović	6–2, 6–1
2013 (1)	(Ukraine) Yuliya Beygelzimer (Ukraine) Maryna Zanevska	(Ukraine) Alona Fomina (Germany) Christina Shakovets	6–3, 6–1
