= Weronika Baszak =

Polish tennis player (born 2002)

- Country (sports): Poland
- Residence: Wrocław, Poland
- Born: 21 September 2002 (age 23) Wrocław
- Plays: Right-handed (one-handed backhand)
- Prize money: $21,967

Singles
- Career record: 40–57
- Career titles: 0
- Highest ranking: No. 692 (17 July 2023)
- Current ranking: No. 786 (29 January 2024)

Doubles
- Career record: 28–21
- Career titles: 2 ITF
- Highest ranking: No. 775 (23 August 2021)
- Current ranking: No. 989 (29 January 2024)
- Last updated on: 29 January 2024.

Weronika Baszak (born 21 September 2002) is a Polish professional tennis player.

Baszak has a career-high ITF combined junior ranking of 39, achieved on 13 January 2020.

She made her WTA Tour main-draw debut as a wildcard entrant at the 2021 Poland Open, losing to Aliaksandra Sasnovich in the first round.

== Junior career ==
Junior Grand Slam results - Singles:

- Australian Open: F (2020)
- French Open: 1R (2020)
- Wimbledon: 1R (2019)
- US Open: –

Junior Grand Slam results - Doubles:

- Australian Open: 2R (2020)
- French Open: 2R (2019)
- Wimbledon: 2R (2019)
- US Open: –

== Junior Grand Slam finals ==
=== Singles: 1 (runner-up) ===
Result	Year	Tournament	Surface	Opponent	Score
Loss	2020	Australian Open	Hard	(Andorra) Victoria Jiménez Kasintseva	7–5, 2–6, 2–6

== ITF Circuit finals ==
=== Doubles: 4 (2 titles, 2 runner-ups) ===
Legend
W15 tournaments

Result	W–L	Date	Tournament	Tier	Surface	Partner	Opponents	Score
Win	1–0	Feb 2021	ITF Shymkent, Kazakhstan	W15	Hard (i)	(Russia) Anastasia Tikhonova	(Russia) Daria Mishina (Russia) Noel Saidenova	6–2, 3–6, [10–6]
Loss	1–1	Aug 2022	ITF Norrköping, Sweden	W15	Clay	(Norway) Astrid Wanja Brune Olsen	(Finland) Laura Hietaranta (France) Laïa Petretic	4–6, 3–6
Win	2–1	May 2023	ITF Vierumäki, Finland	W15	Hard	(Estonia) Anet Angelika Koskel	(Italy) Carlotta Moccia (Italy) Giulia Stefan	6–1, 6–0
Loss	2–2	Jul 2023	ITF Savitaipale, Finland	W15	Clay	(Estonia) Anet Angelika Koskel	(Finland) Laura Hietaranta (Hungary) Luca Udvardy	1–6, 2–6

== ITF Junior Circuit finals ==
Category GA
Category G1
Category G2
Category G3
Category G4
Category G5

=== Singles (7–5) ===
Outcome	No.	Date	Tournament	Grade	Surface	Opponent	Score
Runner-up	1.	28 Oct 2017	Dornbirn, Austria	G5	Carpet (i)	(Switzerland) Nina Geissler	4–6, 0–6
Winner	1.	28 Jan 2018	Szczecin, Poland	G4	Hard (i)	(United Kingdom) Amarni Banks	6–3, 6–1
Winner	2.	24 Feb 2018	Oslo, Norway	G4	Hard (i)	(Norway) Emilie Elde	7–5, 6–0
Winner	3.	2 Mar 2018	Gjøvik, Norway	G4	Hard (i)	(Finland) Ella Haavisto	3–6, 6–2, 6–4
Runner-up	2.	1 Apr 2018	Antalya, Turkey	G4	Hard	(Germany) Eva Lys	2–6, 5–7
Winner	4.	18 Aug 2018	Harare, Zimbabwe	G3	Hard	(Egypt) Amira Badawi	6–2, 6–1
Winner	5.	24 Aug 2018	Phoenix, Mauritius	G4	Hard	(India) Tanisha Kashyap	6–0, 6–2
Runner-up	3.	6 Oct 2018	Salvador, Brazil	G3	Hard	(Finland) Alexandra Anttila	2–6, 6–7^{(3)}
Runner-up	4.	4 May 2019	Istanbul, Turkey	G3	Hard	(Belarus) Jana Kolodynska	6–4, 1–6, 1–6
Runner-up	5.	14 Sep 2019	Stellenbosch, South Africa	G2	Hard	(Germany) Angelina Wirges	6–4, 5–7, 4–6
Winner	6.	9 Nov 2019	Oskemen, Kazakhstan	G3	Hard (i)	(Russia) Ekaterina Maklakova	6–4, 6–3
Winner	7.	5 Jan 2020	Bromma, Sweden	G3	Hard (i)	(Czech Republic) Nikola Bartůňková	6–4, 6–3

=== Doubles (10–8) ===
Outcome	No.	Date	Tournament	Grade	Surface	Partner	Opponents	Score
Runner-up	1.	3 Jun 2017	Chișinău, Moldova	G5	Clay	(Ukraine) Anna Martemyanova	(Moldova) Vlada Medvedcova (Moldova) Vitalia Stamat	5–7, 5–7
Runner-up	2.	27 Jan 2018	Szczecin, Poland	G4	Hard (i)	(Germany) Angelina Wirges	(Poland) Carolina Cerowska (Netherlands) Rixt Van Der Werff	3–6, 7–5, [6–10]
Winner	1.	23 Feb 2018	Oslo, Norway	G4	Hard (i)	(Hungary) Reka Zadori	(United Kingdom) Lillian Mould (United Kingdom) Charlotte Russell	6–0, 6–7^{(6)}, [10–3]
Runner-up	3.	2 Mar 2018	Gjøvik, Norway	G4	Hard (i)	(Finland) Ella Haavisto	(Norway) Emilie Elde (Norway) Lilly Elida Haseth	5–7, 3–6
Runner-up	4.	31 Mar 2018	Antalya, Turkey	G4	Hard	(Slovakia) Katarina Kuzmova	(Romania) Ilinca Amariei (Romania) Raluca Maria Tudorache	4–6, 6–7^{(7)}
Runner-up	5.	31 Mar 2018	Bat Yam, Israel	G4	Hard	(United Kingdom) Erin Richardson	(Israel) Tamara Barad Itzhaki (Israel) Adva Dabah	6–4, 2–6, [9–11]
Winner	2.	17 Aug 2018	Harare, Zimbabwe	G3	Hard	(United States) Sasha Wood	(Thailand) Pimrada Jattavapornvanit (South Africa) Delien Kleinhans	6–0, 6–4
Winner	3.	24 Aug 2018	Phoenix, Mauritius	G4	Hard	(India) Tanisha Kashyap	(South Africa) Maretha Burger (South Africa) Naledi Manyube	6–3, 6–1
Winner	4.	26 Jan 2019	Kolkata, India	G2	Clay	(Italy) Federica Sacco	(Thailand) Lunda Kumhom (Thailand) Mai Napatt Nirundorn	1–6, 6–1, [10–7]
Winner	5.	20 Apr 2019	Megrine, Tunisia	G3	Hard	(Russia) Alina Shcherbinina	(Finland) Alexandra Anttila (United Kingdom) Matilda Mutavdzic	5–7, 6–4, [10–7]
Winner	6.	4 May 2019	Istanbul, Turkey	G3	Hard	(Belarus) Jana Kolodynska	(Russia) Kristina Kudryavtseva (Turkey) Melis Ayda Uyar	w/o
Runner-up	6.	10 May 2019	Arad, Israel	G3	Hard	(Russia) Maria Bondarenko	(Israel) Mika Dagan Fruchtman (Israel) Shavit Kimchi	3–6, 1–6
Winner	7.	28 Jul 2019	Klosters, Switzerland	G1	Hard	(Poland) Martyna Kubka	(Belarus) Viktoryia Kanapatskaya (Belarus) Anna Kubareva	6–1, 7–5
Winner	8.	17 Aug 2019	Kraków, Poland	G3	Clay	(Italy) Federica Sacco	(Poland) Zuzanna Szczepańska (Poland) Aleksandra Wierzbowska	7–6^{(8)}, 6–1
Winner	9.	13 Sep 2019	Stellenbosch, South Africa	G2	Hard	(United Kingdom) Matilda Mutavdzic	(Philippines) Alexandra Eala (United States) Elvina Kalieva	6–3, 4–6, [10–3]
Runner-up	7.	20 Sep 2019	Cape Town, South Africa	GA	Hard	(Czech Republic) Linda Fruhvirtová	(Slovenia) Živa Falkner (United Kingdom) Matilda Mutavdzic	6–3, 6–7^{(10)}, [7–10]
Winner	10.	4 Jan 2020	Bromma, Sweden	G3	Hard (i)	(Sweden) Klara Milicevic	(United Kingdom) Amelia Bissett (Switzerland) Alina Granwehr	7–6^{(5)}, 4–6, [10–6]
Runner-up	8.	17 Jan 2020	Cape Town, South Africa	G2	Hard	(Russia) Maria Sholokhova	(Japan) Mei Hasegawa (Chinese Taipei) Li Yu-yun	4–6, 6–7^{(4)}
