= Maryna Zanevska =

Belgian tennis player (born 1993)

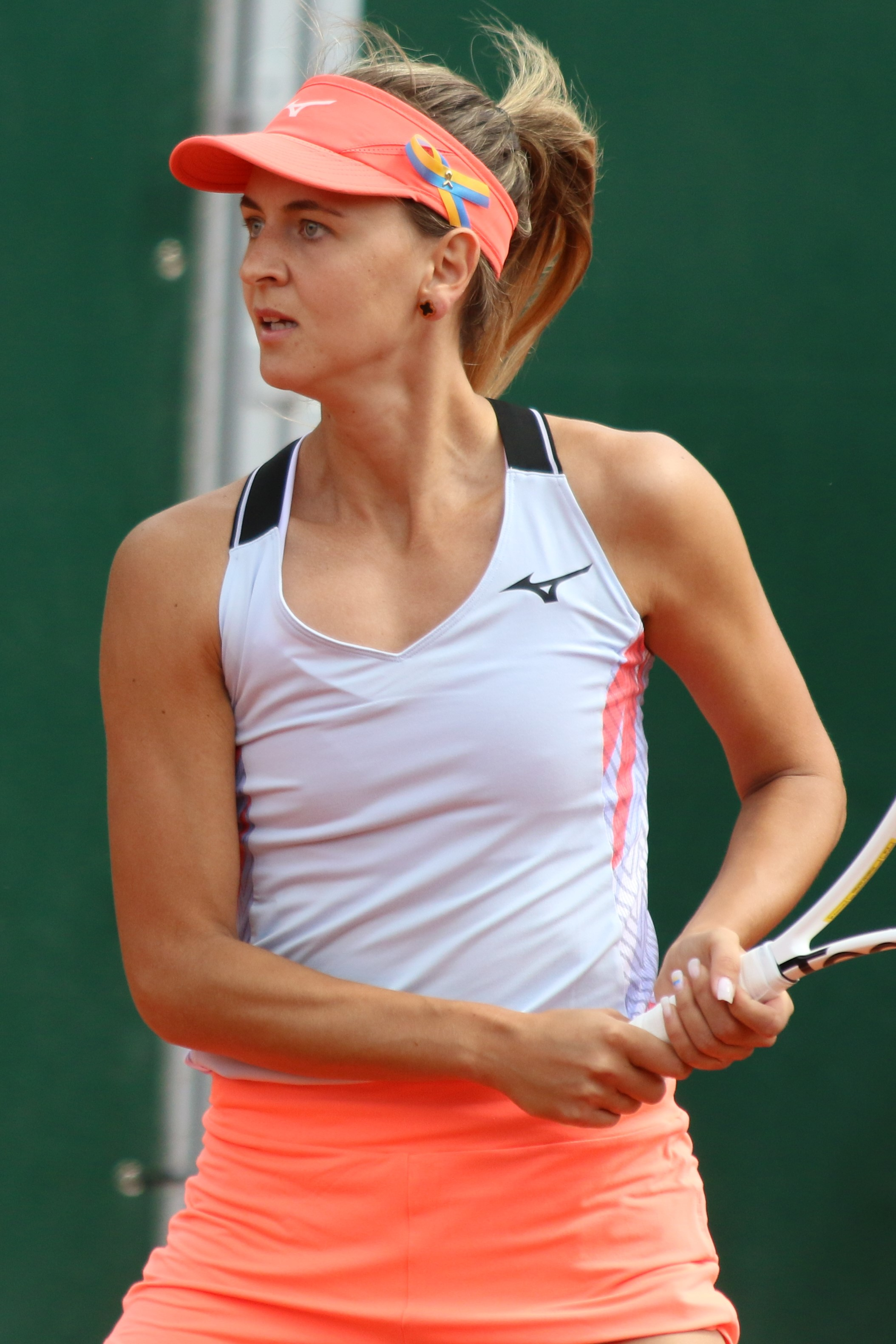
- Maryna Zanevska at the 2022 French Open
- Native name: Марина Заневська
- Country (sports): Ukraine (2009–2016); Belgium (Oct 2016 – Sep 2023)
- Residence: Namur, Belgium
- Born: 24 August 1993 (age 32) Odesa, Ukraine
- Height: 1.75 m (5 ft 9 in)
- Turned pro: 2009
- Retired: 2023
- Plays: Right-handed (two-handed backhand)
- Coach: Geoffroy Vereerstraeten
- Prize money: $1,984,661

Singles
- Career record: 450–276
- Career titles: 1 WTA, 1 WTA Challenger
- Highest ranking: No. 62 (23 May 2022)

Grand Slam singles results
- Australian Open: 2R (2022)
- French Open: 1R (2014, 2016, 2022, 2023)
- Wimbledon: 1R (2017, 2022, 2023)
- US Open: 2R (2022)

Doubles
- Career record: 176–101
- Career titles: 1 WTA Challenger
- Highest ranking: No. 86 (16 June 2014)

Grand Slam doubles results
- Australian Open: 1R (2022)
- French Open: QF (2022)
- Wimbledon: 2R (2018)
- US Open: 1R (2022)

Team competitions
- Fed Cup: 0–2

Maryna Volodymyrivna Zanevska (Ukrainian: Марина Володимирівна Заневська; born 24 August 1993) is a Ukrainian-born Belgian former professional tennis player. She has a career-high singles ranking of world No. 62, achieved on 23 May 2022, and a WTA doubles ranking of 86, reached on 16 June 2014. Zanevska won one WTA Tour singles title and one title in singles and one in doubles on the WTA Challenger Tour. She also reached four WTA Tour doubles finals.

== Personal life ==
Zanevska trained in Belgium since 2008, and resides in Namur. Born in Ukraine, she received Belgian citizenship in October 2016.

== Career ==
=== Junior years ===
==== Grand Slam performance ====
Singles:

- Australian Open: 3R (2010)
- French Open: 3R (2011)
- Wimbledon: 1R (2009)
- US Open: 2R (2009)

Doubles:

- Australian Open: 1R (2009, 2010)
- French Open: W (2011)
- Wimbledon: 2R (2009)
- US Open: W (2009)

=== Professional ===
Zanevska won the 2009 US Open girls' doubles title with partner Valeria Solovyeva and the 2011 French Open girls' doubles title with Irina Khromacheva.

She won her maiden WTA Tour singles title at the 2021 WTA Poland Open, defeating Kristína Kučová in the final.

Zanevska reached a career-high singles ranking of world No. 62 in May 2022, and in October that year won her first WTA 125 singles title at the Open de Rouen, overcoming Viktorija Golubic in the final.

In August 2023, she announced that the 2023 US Open would be her final professional event, revealing she had been struggling with back pain for the previous four years. Zanevska lost to second seed Aryna Sabalenka in the first round.

== Performance timeline ==
Key
W	F	SF	QF	#R	RR	Q#	DNQ	A	NH

(W) winner; (F) finalist; (SF) semifinalist; (QF) quarterfinalist; (#R) rounds 4, 3, 2, 1; (RR) round-robin stage; (Q#) qualification round; (DNQ) did not qualify; (A) absent; (NH) not held; (SR) strike rate (events won / competed); (W–L) win–loss record.
To avoid confusion and double counting, these charts are updated at the conclusion of a tournament or when the player's participation has ended.

Only main-draw results in WTA Tour, Grand Slam tournaments, Fed Cup/Billie Jean King Cup and Olympic Games are included in win–loss records.

=== Singles ===
Tournament	2013	2014	2015	2016	2017	2018	2019	2020	2021	2022	2023	SR	W–L	Win%
Grand Slam tournaments
Australian Open	Q2	Q1	Q3	1R	1R	Q1	Q1	A	Q3	2R (Note: Withdrawal before second round match. Not counted as a loss.)	1R	0 / 4	1–3	25%
French Open	Q2	1R	Q3	1R	Q3	Q2	A	A	A	1R	1R	0 / 4	0–4	0%
Wimbledon	Q1	Q2	Q1	Q3	1R	Q1	Q1	NH	Q1	1R	1R	0 / 3	0–3	0%
US Open	Q1	1R	Q3	Q1	Q1	Q1	A	A	Q2	2R	1R	0 / 3	1–3	25%
Win–loss	0–0	0–2	0–0	0–2	0–2	0–0	0–0	0–0	0–0	2–3	0–4	0 / 14	2–13	13%
WTA 1000
Dubai / Qatar Open (Note: The first Premier 5 event of the year has switched back and forth between the Dubai Tennis Championships and the Qatar Ladies Open since 2009. Dubai was classified as a Premier 5 event from 2009 to 2011 before being succeeded by Doha for the 2012–2014 period. In 2015, Dubai regained its Premier 5 status while Doha was demoted to Premier status. The Premier 5 tournaments were reclassified as WTA 1000 tournaments in 2021.)	A	1R	A	Q1	A	A	A	A	A	Q2	Q1	0 / 1	0–1	0%
Indian Wells Open	A	Q2	A	A	A	A	A	NH	A	1R	1R	0 / 2	0–2	0%
Miami Open	A	A	A	A	A	A	A	NH	A	1R	1R	0 / 2	0–2	0%
Madrid Open	A	A	A	A	A	A	A	NH	A	A	2R	1 / 1	1-1	50%
Italian Open	A	A	A	A	A	A	A	A	A	A	1R	0 / 1	0–1	0%
Canadian Open	A	A	A	A	A	A	A	NH	A	A		0 / 0	0–0	–
Cincinnati Open	A	A	A	A	A	A	A	A	A	A		0 / 0	0–0	–
Pan Pacific/Wuhan Open (Note: In 2014, the Pan Pacific Open was downgraded to a Premier event and replaced by the Wuhan Open.)	A	A	A	A	A	A	A	NH				0 / 0	0–0	–
China Open	A	A	A	A	A	A	A	NH				0 / 0	0–0	–
Career statistics
Tournaments	3	6	4	3	7	2	0	0	3	14	6	Career total: 48		
Titles	0	0	0	0	0	0	0	0	1	0	0	Career total: 1		
Finals	0	0	0	0	0	0	0	0	1	0	0	Career total: 1		
Overall win-loss	1–3	1–6	2–4	0–3	0–8	1–2	0–0	0–0	9–2	10–14	4–6	1 / 48	28–48	37%
Year-end ranking	117	134	140	127	147	221	249	258	81	81		$1,567,146		

== WTA Tour finals ==
=== Singles: 1 (title) ===
Legend WTA 250 (1–0)	Finals by surface Clay (1–0)

Result	W–L	Date	Tournament	Tier	Surface	Opponent	Score
Win	1–0	Jul 2021	Poland Open, Poland	WTA 250	Clay	(Slovakia) Kristína Kučová	6–4, 7–6^{(7–4)}

=== Doubles: 4 (runner-ups) ===
Legend WTA 250 (0–4)	Finals by surface Clay (0–4)

Result	W–L	Date	Tournament	Tier	Surface	Partner	Opponents	Score
Loss	0–1	Apr 2014	Marrakesh Grand Prix, Morocco	International (Note: The WTA International tournaments were reclassified as WTA 250 tournaments in 2021.)	Clay	(Poland) Katarzyna Piter	(Spain) Garbiñe Muguruza (Switzerland) Romina Oprandi	6–4, 2–6, [9–11]
Loss	0–2	May 2015	Marrakesh Grand Prix, Morocco	International	Clay	(Germany) Laura Siegemund	(Hungary) Tímea Babos (France) Kristina Mladenovic	1–6, 6–7^{(5)}
Loss	0–3	May 2017	Rabat Grand Prix, Morocco	International	Clay	(Serbia) Nina Stojanović	(Hungary) Tímea Babos (Czech Republic) Andrea Hlaváčková	6–2, 3–6, [5–10]
Loss	0–4	Jul 2018	Bucharest Open, Romania	International	Clay	(Montenegro) Danka Kovinić	(Romania) Irina-Camelia Begu (Romania) Andreea Mitu	3–6, 4–6

== WTA 125 finals ==
=== Singles: 1 (title) ===
Result	Date	Tournament	Surface	Opponent	Score
Win	Oct 2022	Open de Rouen, France	Hard (i)	(Switzerland) Viktorija Golubic	7–6^{(8–6)}, 6–1

=== Doubles: 1 (title) ===
Result	Date	Tournament	Surface	Partner	Opponents	Score
Win	Nov 2017	Open de Limoges, France	Hard (i)	(Russia) Valeria Savinykh	(France) Chloé Paquet (France) Pauline Parmentier	6–0, 6–2

== ITF Circuit finals ==
=== Singles: 31 (19 titles, 12 runner-ups; 1 not played) ===
Legend $100,000 tournaments (1–1) $75/80,000 tournaments (1–0) $50/60,000 tournaments (3–2) $25,000 tournaments (8–7) $10/15,000 tournaments (6–2)	Finals by surface Hard (10–5) Clay (8–6) Carpet (1–1)

Result	W–L	Date	Tournament	Tier	Surface	Opponent	Score
Win	1–0	Jul 2009	ITF Brussels, Belgium	10,000	Clay	(Poland) Katarzyna Piter	0–6, 7–5, 7–5
Win	2–0	Jul 2010	ITF Zwevegem, Belgium	25,000	Clay	(Belgium) Sofie Oyen	7–6^{(4)}, 6–1
Loss	2–1	Oct 2011	ITF Antalya, Turkey	10,000	Clay	(Romania) Diana Buzean	1–6, 7–6^{(5)}, 4–6
Win	3–1	Nov 2011	ITF Équeurdreville, France	10,000	Hard	(Germany) Anna-Lena Friedsam	6–4, 6–2
Loss	3–2	Jan 2012	ITF Stuttgart, Germany	10,000	Hard (i)	(Czech Republic) Tereza Smitková	4–6, 6–7^{(4)}
Win	4–2	Feb 2012	ITF Mâcon, France	10,000	Hard (i)	(Croatia) Ema Mikulčić	6–1, 6–2
Win	5–2	Mar 2012	ITF Bron, France	10,000	Hard (i)	(Ukraine) Anastasiya Vasylyeva	5–7, 7–6^{(2)}, 6–3
Win	6–2	Mar 2012	ITF Dijon, France	10,000	Hard (i)	(Latvia) Diāna Marcinkēviča	6–4, 6–4
Win	7–2	Apr 2012	ITF Tessenderlo, Belgium	25,000	Clay (i)	(Germany) Tatjana Maria	6–2, 6–2
Win	8–2	Sep 2012	Open de Saint Malo, France	25,000	Clay	(Spain) Estrella Cabeza Candela	6–2, 6–7^{(5)}, 6–0
Loss	8–3	Oct 2012	Open de Limoges, France	50,000	Hard (i)	(France) Claire Feuerstein	5–7, 3–6
Loss	8–4	Feb 2013	Open de l'Isère, France	25,000	Hard (i)	(Czech Republic) Sandra Záhlavová	4–6, 7–5, 2–6
Win	9–4	Feb 2013	ITF Moscow, Russia	25,000	Hard (i)	(Georgia (country)) Sofia Shapatava	6–4, 7–6^{(7)}
Win	10–4	Mar 2013	ITF Bron, France	10,000	Hard (i)	(Belgium) Ysaline Bonaventure	6–2, 6–1
Loss	10–5	May 2013	Open de Cagnes-sur-Mer, France	100,000	Clay	(France) Caroline Garcia	6–0, 4–6, 6–3
Loss	10–6	Jul 2013	Reinert Open Versmold, Germany	50,000	Clay	(Germany) Dinah Pfizenmaier	4–6, 6–4, 4–6
Win	11–6	Jul 2014	ITF Bad Saulgau, Germany	25,000	Clay	(Brazil) Gabriela Cé	6–0, 6–4
Win	12–6	Aug 2014	ITF Koksijde, Belgium	25,000	Clay	(Netherlands) Richèl Hogenkamp	6–1, 6–1
Loss	12–7	Mar 2015	ITF Seville, Spain	25,000	Clay	(Belarus) Olga Govortsova	5–7, 2–6
Loss	12–8	Mar 2015	Innisbrook Open, United States	25,000	Clay	(United States) Katerina Stewart	6–1, 3–6, 0–2 ret.
Win	13–8	Sep 2016	Open de Saint-Malo, France	50,000	Clay	(Italy) Camilla Rosatello	6–1, 6–3
Loss	13–9	Oct 2016	ITF Équeurdreville, France	25,000	Hard (i)	(Netherlands) Arantxa Rus	2–6, 1–6
Win	14–9	Oct 2016	Open de Touraine, France	50,000	Hard (i)	(Romania) Elena Gabriela Ruse	6–3, 6–3
Win	15–9	Aug 2017	Vancouver Open, Canada	100,000	Hard	(Montenegro) Danka Kovinić	5–7, 6–1, 6–3
Win	16–9	Mar 2018	Zhuhai Open, China	60,000	Hard	(Ukraine) Marta Kostyuk	6–2, 6–4
Loss	16–10	Feb 2019	AK Ladies Open, Germany	25,000	Carpet (i)	(China) Ma Shuyue	4–6, 7–5, 5–7
Win	17–10	Apr 2019	ITF Óbidos, Portugal	25,000	Carpet	(Georgia (country)) Mariam Bolkvadze	7–5, 6–2
Loss	17–11	Sep 2020	ITF Tarvisio, Italy	25,000	Clay	(Italy) Federica di Sarra	6–3, 3–6, 4–6
Finalist (Note: The final was abandoned due to poor weather with Andrea Lázaro García leading 7–5, 6–5. Both players agreed to split ranking points and prize money.)	–NP	Nov 2020	ITF Las Palmas, Spain	15,000	Clay	(Spain) Andrea Lázaro García	cancelled
Loss	17–12	Feb 2021	Open de l'Isère, France	25,000	Hard (i)	(Switzerland) Viktorija Golubic	1–6, 6–4, 6–7^{(2)}
Win	18–12	Jun 2021	ITF Otočec, Slovenia	25,000	Clay	(Croatia) Lea Bošković	7–6^{(4)}, 6–0
Win	19–12	Oct 2021	ITF Les Franqueses del Vallès, Spain	80,000+H	Hard	(Switzerland) Ylena In-Albon	7–6^{(5)}, 6–4

=== Doubles: 25 (13 titles, 12 runner-ups) ===
Legend $100,000 tournaments (2–3) $50/60,000 tournaments (3–3) $25,000 tournaments (6–6) $10,000 tournaments (2–0)	Finals by surface Hard (4–4) Clay (9–6) Carpet (0–1) Grass (0–1)

Result	W–L	Date	Tournament	Tier	Surface	Partner	Opponents	Score
Win	1–0	Mar 2010	ITF St. Petersburg, Russia	10,000	Hard (i)	(Ukraine) Alyona Sotnikova	(Russia) Alexandra Panova (Russia) Eugeniya Pashkova	7–5, 6–3
Loss	1–1	Jul 2010	ITF Zwevegem, Belgium	25,000	Clay	(Russia) Irina Khromacheva	(Netherlands) Richèl Hogenkamp (Russia) Valeria Savinykh	3–6, 6–3, 5–7
Win	2–1	Sep 2010	ITF Denain, France	25,000	Clay	(Russia) Nadejda Guskova	(Italy) Evelyn Mayr (Italy) Julia Mayr	6–2, 6–0
Loss	2–2	Sep 2010	Royal Cup, Montenegro	25,000	Clay	(Russia) Valeria Solovyeva	(Romania) Irina-Camelia Begu (Romania) Mihaela Buzărnescu	7–5, 5–7, [10–12]
Loss	2–3	Apr 2011	ITF Tessenderlo, Belgium	25,000	Clay	(Ukraine) Elina Svitolina	(Germany) Anna-Lena Grönefeld (Germany) Tatjana Malek	5–7, 3–6
Win	3–3	Jun 2011	Open de Montpellier, France	25,000	Clay	(Brazil) Paula Cristina Gonçalves	(Romania) Madalina Gojnea (Spain) Inés Ferrer Suárez	6–4, 7–5
Win	4–3	Jun 2011	ITF Middelburg, Netherlands	25,000	Clay	(Netherlands) Quirine Lemoine	(United States) Julia Cohen (Argentina) Florencia Molinero	6–3, 6–4
Win	5–3	Jul 2011	ITF Zwevegem, Belgium	25,000	Clay	(Slovakia) Lenka Wienerová	(Netherlands) Kim Kilsdonk (Netherlands) Nicolette van Uitert	6–4, 3–6, [10–7]
Win	6–3	Oct 2011	ITF Antalya, Turkey	10,000	Clay	(Georgia (country)) Sofia Kvatsabaia	(Romania) Diana Enache (Netherlands) Daniëlle Harmsen	6–4, 6–1
Loss	6–4	Feb 2012	Open de l'Isère, France	25,000	Hard (i)	(Ukraine) Valentyna Ivakhnenko	(Czech Republic) Karolína Plíšková (Czech Republic) Kristýna Plíšková	1–6, 3–6
Win	7–4	Apr 2012	ITF Tessenderlo, Belgium	25,000	Clay	(Netherlands) Demi Schuurs	(Germany) Tatjana Maria (Liechtenstein) Stephanie Vogt	6–4, 6–3
Loss	7–5	Feb 2013	ITF Moscow, Russia	25,000	Hard (i)	(Russia) Valeria Solovyeva	(Russia) Margarita Gasparyan (Russia) Polina Monova	4–6, 6–2, [5–10]
Win	8–5	Aug 2013	Vancouver Open, Canada	100,000	Hard	(Canada) Sharon Fichman	(United States) Jacqueline Cako (United States) Natalie Pluskota	6–2, 6–2
Win	9–5	Sep 2013	Trabzon Cup, Turkey	50,000	Hard	(Ukraine) Yuliya Beygelzimer	(Ukraine) Alona Fomina (Germany) Christina Shakovets	6–3, 6–1
Loss	9–6	Jul 2014	Sobota Open, Poland	50,000	Clay	(Ukraine) Anastasiya Vasylyeva	(Czech Republic) Barbora Krejčíková (Serbia) Aleksandra Krunić	6–3, 0–6, [6–10]
Loss	9–7	Oct 2014	Internationaux de Poitiers, France	100,000	Hard (i)	(Poland) Katarzyna Piter	(Czech Republic) Andrea Hlaváčková (Czech Republic) Lucie Hradecká	1–6, 5–7
Loss	9–8	Jun 2015	Open de Marseille, France	100,000	Clay	(United States) Nicole Melichar	(Argentina) Tatiana Búa (France) Laura Thorpe	3–6, 6–3, [6–10]
Win	10–8	Mar 2016	ITF Naples, United States	25,000	Hard	(Russia) Valeriya Solovyeva	(United States) Sophie Chang (Netherlands) Quirine Lemoine	7–5, 6–0
Win	11–8	Sep 2016	Open de Biarritz, France	100,000	Clay	(Russia) Irina Khromacheva	(Sweden) Cornelia Lister (Serbia) Nina Stojanović	4–6, 7–5, [10–8]
Loss	11–9	Jun 2017	Ilkley Trophy, United Kingdom	100,000	Grass	(Poland) Paula Kania	(Russia) Anna Blinkova (Russia) Alla Kudryavtseva	1–6, 4–6
Loss	11–10	Feb 2018	AK Ladies Open, Germany	25,000	Carpet (i)	(Greece) Valentini Grammatikopoulou	(Latvia) Diāna Marcinkēviča (Poland) Katarzyna Piter	w/o
Loss	11–11	Sep 2018	Montreux Ladies Open, Switzerland	60,000	Clay	(Brazil) Laura Pigossi	(Romania) Andreea Mitu (Romania) Elena Gabriela Ruse	6–4, 3–6, [4–10]
Loss	11–12	Jan 2019	Burnie International, Australia	60,000	Hard	(Russia) Irina Khromacheva	(Australia) Ellen Perez (Australia) Arina Rodionova	4–6, 3–6
Win	12–12	Sep 2019	Open de Saint-Malo, France	60,000+H	Clay	(Georgia (country)) Ekaterine Gorgodze	(Spain) Aliona Bolsova (Croatia) Tereza Mrdeža	6–7^{(8)}, 7–5, [10–8]
Win	13–12	Oct 2019	Kiskút Open, Hungary	60,000	Clay (i)	(Romania) Irina Bara	(Uzbekistan) Akgul Amanmuradova (Romania) Elena Bogdan	3–6, 6–2, [10–8]

== Junior Grand Slam tournament finals ==
=== Girls' doubles: 2 (2 titles) ===
Result	Year	Tournament	Surface	Partner	Opponents	Score
Win	2009	US Open	Hard	(Russia) Valeria Solovyeva	(Romania) Elena Bogdan (Thailand) Noppawan Lertcheewakarn	1–6, 6–3, [10–7]
Win	2011	French Open	Clay	(Russia) Irina Khromacheva	(Russia) Victoria Kan (Netherlands) Demi Schuurs	6–4, 7–5
