= Valeriia Olianovskaia =

Russian tennis player (born 2001)

- Country (sports): Russia (–2024); Poland (2024)
- Born: 12 March 2001 (age 25) Moscow, Russia
- Height: 1.82 m (6 ft 0 in)
- Plays: Right (two-handed backhand)
- Prize money: $38,787

Singles
- Career record: 134–77
- Career titles: 2 ITF
- Highest ranking: No. 553 (4 December 2023)

Doubles
- Career record: 34–34
- Career titles: 1 ITF
- Highest ranking: No. 792 (3 October 2022)

Valeriia Olianovskaia (also spelt as Valeriya Olyanovskaya, Polish: Waleria Olianowska; born 12 March 2001) is a Russian-born Polish former tennis player. She reached career-high WTA rankings of 553 in singles and 792 in doubles.

Her last appearance on the circuit was in October 2024.

== Career highlights ==
Olianovskaia made her WTA Tour main-draw debut at the 2021 WTA Poland Open, after she received a wildcard into the singles tournament. She lost to Anna Bondár in the first round.

== ITF Circuit finals ==
=== Singles: 7 (2 titles, 5 runner-ups) ===
Legend W25 tournaments W15 tournaments	Finals by surface Hard (0–1) Clay (2–4)

Result	W–L	Date	Tournament	Tier	Surface	Opponent	Score
Win	1–0	Jan 2020	ITF Antalya, Turkey	W15	Clay	(Croatia) Silvia Njirić	6–0, 6–2
Loss	1–1	May 2021	ITF Tbilisi, Georgia	W15	Hard	(Poland) Weronika Falkowska	4–6, 3–6
Loss	1–2	Jun 2021	ITF Shymkent, Kazakhstan	W15	Clay	(Ukraine) Anastasiia Sobolieva	4–6, 6–7^{(4–7)}
Loss	1–3	May 2022	ITF Annenheim, Austria	W15	Clay	(Germany) Silvia Ambrosio	1–6, 4–6
Win	2–3	Aug 2022	ITF Bydgoszcz, Poland	W15	Clay	(Czech Republic) Linda Klimovičová	6–3, 6–1
Loss	2–4	Apr 2023	ITF Antalya, Turkey	W15	Clay	(Romania) Ilinca Amariei	4–6, 2–6
Loss	2–5	Sep 2023	ITF Varna, Bulgaria	W25	Clay	(Romania) Ilona Georgiana Ghioroaie	4–6, 2–6

=== Doubles: 5 (1 title, 4 runner-ups) ===
Legend W25 tournaments W15 tournaments	Finals by surface Hard (0–1) Clay (1–3)

Result	W–L	Date	Tournament	Tier	Surface	Partner	Opponents	Score
Loss	0–1	Oct 2019	Telavi Open, Georgia	W15	Clay	(Russia) Taisya Pachkaleva	(Russia) Margarita Lazareva (Romania) Oana Georgeta Simion	4–6, 6–4, [8–10]
Loss	0–2	May 2021	ITF Tbilisi, Georgia	W15	Hard	(Turkey) Ayla Aksu	(Switzerland) Jenny Dürst (Poland) Weronika Falkowska	3–6, 2–6
Loss	0–3	Dec 2021	ITF Heraklion, Greece	W15	Clay	(Russia) Nina Olyanovskaya	(Italy) Nicole Fossa Huergo (United Kingdom) Lauryn John-Baptiste	5–7, 4–6
Win	1–3	Jun 2022	ITF Alkmaar, Netherlands	W15	Clay	(Poland) Stefania Rogozińska Dzik	(United States) Chiara Scholl (Netherlands) Lexie Stevens	6–3, 5–7, [10–6]
Loss	1–4	Aug 2022	ITF Bydgoszcz, Poland	W15	Clay	(Poland) Stefania Rogozińska Dzik	(Ukraine) Maryna Kolb (Ukraine) Nadiya Kolb	4–6, 6–1, [7–10]
