= 2024 Ladies Open Amstetten =

Tennis tournament

- Date: 12–18 August 2024
- Edition: 1st
- Category: ITF Women's World Tennis Tour
- Prize money: $60,000
- Surface: Clay / Outdoor
- Location: Amstetten, Austria

Champions

Singles
- Elena Pridankina

Doubles
- (Spain) Yvonne Cavallé Reimers / (Netherlands) Eva Vedder
Ladies Open Amstetten	· 2025 →

The 2024 Ladies Open Amstetten was a professional tennis tournament played on outdoor clay courts. It was the first edition of the tournament, which was part of the 2024 ITF Women's World Tennis Tour. It took place in Amstetten, Austria, between 12 and 18 August 2024.

== Champions ==
=== Singles ===
- Elena Pridankina def. (Ukraine) Valeriya Strakhova, 6–0, 6–4

=== Doubles ===
- (Spain) Yvonne Cavallé Reimers / (Netherlands) Eva Vedder def. (Czech Republic) Jesika Malečková / (Czech Republic) Miriam Škoch, 6–3, 6–2

== Singles main draw entrants ==
=== Seeds ===
Country	Player	Rank	Seed
FRA	Léolia Jeanjean	155	1
BEL	Hanne Vandewinkel	227	2
LTU	Justina Mikulskytė	235	3
TUR	Berfu Cengiz	244	4
ITA	Nuria Brancaccio	245	5
SRB	Dejana Radanović	249	6
GER	Noma Noha Akugue	252	7
	Elena Pridankina	259	8

- Rankings are as of 5 August 2024.

=== Other entrants ===
The following players received wildcards into the singles main draw:

- (Austria) Stefanie Auer
- (Austria) Claudia Gasparovic
- (Austria) Tamara Kostic
- (Austria) Anna Pircher

The following players received entry from the qualifying draw:

- (Poland) Weronika Falkowska
- (Germany) Sina Herrmann
- (Germany) Mina Hodzic
- (Slovakia) Renáta Jamrichová
- Victoria Kan
- (Italy) Verena Meliss
- (Netherlands) Rose Marie Nijkamp
- (Bulgaria) Julia Stamatova

The following player received entry as a lucky loser:

- (Slovakia) Anika Jašková
