= 2026 Ankara Open =

- Date: 21–27 September
- Edition: 1st
- Category: WTA 125
- Draw: 32S / 16D
- Prize money: $115,000
- Surface: Hard
- Location: Ankara, Turkey
- Venue: Topspin Tennis Academy Bilkent

Champions

Singles
- (Turkey) Berfu Cengiz

Doubles
- (Poland) Weronika Falkowska / (United States) Alana Smith
- Ankara Open

The 2026 Ankara Open, also known as Turk Telecom Ankara Open for sponsorship reasons, was a professional women's tennis tournament played on outdoor hard courts. It was the 1st edition of this WTA 125 tournament, which was part of the 2026 WTA 125 Circuit. It took place in Ankara, Turkey, from 21 through 27 September 2026.

== Singles main draw entrants ==
=== Seeds ===
| Country | Player | Rank^{†} | Seed |
|---|---|---|---|
| ARG | Solana Sierra | 90 | 1 |
| | Polina Iatcenko | 138 | 2 |
| ARG | Julia Riera | 144 | 3 |
| POL | Martyna Kubka | 171 | 4 |
| SRB | Teodora Kostović | 186 | 5 |
| | Anastasia Gasanova | 191 | 6 |
| | Elena Pridankina | 192 | 7 |
| | ~~Julia Avdeeva~~ | ~~195~~ | ~~8~~ |
| TUR | Ayla Aksu | 216 | 9 |

^{†} Ranking are as of 14 September 2026.

=== Other entrants ===
The following players received wildcards into the singles main draw :

- (Turkey) Alya Naz Altinel
- (Turkey) Çağla Büyükakçay
- (Turkey) Deniz Dilek
- (Turkey) Ayşegül Mert

The following players received entry from the qualifying draw :

- Daria Egorova
- (Poland) Weronika Falkowska
- (Germany) Marie Vogt
- (Turkey) İlay Yörük

The following player received entry into the main draw as a lucky loser:

- Ksenia Zaytseva

=== Withdrawals ===
Before the tournament

- Julia Avdeeva → replaced by Ksenia Zaytseva (LL)
- (France) Anna Blinkova → replaced by (Bulgaria) Isabella Shinikova
- (France) Loïs Boisson → replaced by (Turkey) Berfu Cengiz
- (China) Gao Xinyu → replaced by (United States) Fiona Crawley
- (United States) Katrina Scott → replaced by (Slovakia) Katarína Kužmová
- (Latvia) Darja Semeņistaja → replaced by (Japan) Yuki Naito

== Doubles main draw entrants ==
=== Seeds ===
| Country | Player | Country | Player | Rank^{1} | Seed |
|---|---|---|---|---|---|
| | Elena Pridankina | | Anastasia Tikhonova | 152 | 1 |
| SLO | Dalila Jakupović | SUI | Naïma Karamoko | 178 | 2 |
| NED | Isabelle Haverlag | POL | Martyna Kubka | 204 | 3 |
| POL | Weronika Falkowska | USA | Alana Smith | 205 | 4 |

- ^{1} Rankings as of 14 September 2026.

=== Other entrants ===
The following pairs received a wildcard into the doubles main draw:

- (Turkey) Alya Naz Altinel / Daria Egorova
- (Turkey) Duru Arslan / (Turkey) Sude Ulueren

=== Withdrawals ===
- (Australia) Melisa Ercan / (Japan) Yuki Naito
- Aliona Falei / Polina Iatcenko

== Champions ==
=== Singles ===
- (Turkey) Berfu Cengiz def. (Serbia) Teodora Kostović 2–6, 6–4, 7–5

=== Doubles ===
- (Poland) Weronika Falkowska / (United States) Alana Smith def. (Slovenia) Dalila Jakupović / (Switzerland) Naïma Karamoko 6–2, 7–6^{(7–2)}
