= 2025 Ladies Open Amstetten – Singles =

Singles
- 2025 Ladies Open Amstetten

Final
- Champion: (Austria) Sinja Kraus
- Runner-up: (Austria) Lilli Tagger
- Score: 6–2, 6–4

Events
Singles	Doubles
← 2024 ·	Ladies Open Amstetten	· 2026 →

Elena Pridankina was the defending champion but chose not to participate.

Sinja Kraus won the title, defeating Lilli Tagger in the final, 6–2, 6–4.

== Seeds ==
1. (Austria) Julia Grabher (semifinals)
2. (Austria) Sinja Kraus (champion)
3. (Germany) Tamara Korpatsch (quarterfinals)
4. (Slovenia) Tamara Zidanšek (withdrew)
5. (Ukraine) Oleksandra Oliynykova (first round)
6. (Cyprus) Raluca Șerban (second round)
7. (France) Carole Monnet (withdrew)
8. (Bulgaria) Lia Karatancheva (first round)

== Draw ==
=== Key ===
- Q = Qualifier
- WC = Wild card
- LL = Lucky loser
- Alt = Alternate
- ITF = ITF entry
- PR = Protected ranking
- SR = Special ranking
- SE = Special exempt
- JE = Junior exempt
- JR = Junior Accelerator Programme entrant
- CO = College Accelerator Programme entrant
- NG = Next Gen Accelerator Program entrant
- w/o = Walkover
- r = Retired
- d = Defaulted

=== Finals ===
Semifinals
1	(Austria) Julia Grabher	5	4
WC	(Austria) Lilli Tagger	7	6
(Slovakia) Renáta Jamrichová	1	4
2	(Austria) Sinja Kraus	6	6

Final
WC	(Austria) Lilli Tagger	2	4
2	(Austria) Sinja Kraus	6	6

=== Top half ===
First round
1	(Austria) J Grabher	6	6
Q	(Hungary) A Nagy	2	1
(Slovenia) D Jakupović	6	6
LL	(Serbia) M Mašić	3	1
LL	(Italy) L Mair	6	6
(Poland) W Falkowska	2	3
(Czech Republic) N Bartůňková	6	6
8	(Bulgaria) L Karatancheva	2	3
3	(Germany) T Korpatsch	1	6	6
(Romania) I Amariei	6	2	4
Q	(Poland) W Ewald	7	6
(Hungary) A Tóth	5	3
Q	(Italy) E Chiesa	7^{7}	2	4
WC	(Austria) L Tagger	6^{5}	6	6
(Serbia) T Kostović	7	3	6
5	(Ukraine) O Oliynykova	5	6	3

Second round
1	(Austria) J Grabher	6	6
(Slovenia) D Jakupović	3	2
LL	(Italy) L Mair	1	4
(Czech Republic) N Bartůňková	6	6
3	(Germany) T Korpatsch	6	6
Q	(Poland) W Ewald	3	2
WC	(Austria) L Tagger	6	6
(Serbia) T Kostović	2	2

Quarterfinals
1	(Austria) J Grabher	2	6	6
(Czech Republic) N Bartůňková	6	4	1
3	(Germany) T Korpatsch	2	0
WC	(Austria) L Tagger	6	6

Semifinals
1	(Austria) J Grabher	5	4
WC	(Austria) L Tagger	7	6

=== Bottom half ===
First round
Q	(Romania) A Prisăcariu	6	6
(Slovakia) M Okáľová	4	2
WC	(Austria) LM Rothensteiner	2	2
(Slovakia) R Jamrichová	6	6
LL	(Italy) C Gennaro	2	1
WC	(Austria) E Perelygina	6	6
WC	(Austria) A Koller	4	2
Q	(India) R Bhatia	6	6
6	(Cyprus) R Șerban	6	6
(Slovakia) R Zelníčková	4	3
Q	(Czech Republic) A Laboutková	6^{5}	4
Q	(Sweden) L Zaar	7^{7}	6
Q	(Slovenia) N Radišić	6	4	3
LL	(Italy) V Meliss	3	6	6
(Italy) S Ambrosio	2	4
2	(Austria) S Kraus	6	6

Second round
Q	(Romania) A Prisăcariu	2	6	1
(Slovakia) R Jamrichová	6	4	6
WC	(Austria) E Perelygina	6	5	6^{6}
Q	(India) R Bhatia	2	7	7^{8}
6	(Cyprus) R Șerban	6^{4}	2
Q	(Sweden) L Zaar	7^{7}	6
LL	(Italy) V Meliss	1	1
2	(Austria) S Kraus	6	6

Quarterfinals
(Slovakia) R Jamrichová	6	6
Q	(India) R Bhatia	4	3
Q	(Sweden) L Zaar	2	4
2	(Austria) S Kraus	6	6

Semifinals
(Slovakia) R Jamrichová	1	4
2	(Austria) S Kraus	6	6
