= Berfu (name) =

Berfu is a given name. In Turkish, it means "snowflake"; derived from Persian.

- Berfu Cengiz, Turkish tennis player
- Berfu Yenenler, Turkish model
- Berfu Halisdemir, Turkish actress
- Berfu Öngören, Turkish actress
- Berfu Ergenekon, Turkish writer
