= 2024 Ladies Open Amstetten – Singles =

Singles
- 2024 Ladies Open Amstetten

Final
- Champion: Elena Pridankina
- Runner-up: (Ukraine) Valeriya Strakhova
- Score: 6–0, 6–4

Events
Singles	Doubles
Ladies Open Amstetten	· 2025 →

This was the first edition of the tournament.

Elena Pridankina won the title, defeating Valeriya Strakhova in the final, 6–0, 6–4.

== Seeds ==
1. (France) Léolia Jeanjean (first round)
2. (Belgium) Hanne Vandewinkel (second round)
3. (Lithuania) Justina Mikulskytė (quarterfinals)
4. (Turkey) Berfu Cengiz (semifinals)
5. (Italy) Nuria Brancaccio (first round, retired)
6. (Serbia) Dejana Radanović (first round, retired)
7. (Germany) Noma Noha Akugue (semifinals)
8. Elena Pridankina (champion)

== Draw ==
=== Key ===
- Q = Qualifier
- WC = Wild card
- LL = Lucky loser
- Alt = Alternate
- SE = Special exempt
- PR = Protected ranking
- ITF = ITF entry
- JE = Junior exempt
- w/o = Walkover
- r = Retired
- d = Defaulted
- SR = Special ranking

=== Finals ===
Semifinals
8	Elena Pridankina	6	7
4	(Turkey) Berfu Cengiz	1	5
7	(Germany) Noma Noha Akugue	4	6	4
(Ukraine) Valeriya Strakhova	6	0	6

Final
8	Elena Pridankina	6	6
(Ukraine) Valeriya Strakhova	0	4

=== Top half ===
First round
1	(France) L Jeanjean	6	0	2
(Austria) S Kraus	2	6	6
LL	(Slovakia) A Jašková	2	1
(Italy) T Pieri	6	6
Q	(Bulgaria) J Stamatova	1^{r}
Q	(Germany) S Herrmann	5
WC	(Austria) T Kostic	0	0
8	E Pridankina	6	6
4	(Turkey) B Cengiz	6	6
(Mexico) M Portillo Ramírez	3	2
WC	(Austria) S Auer	4	2
Q	(Poland) W Falkowska	6	6
WC	(Austria) A Pircher	6	6
WC	(Austria) C Gasparovic	1	4
Q	V Kan	7^{7}	5
5	(Italy) N Brancaccio	6^{2}	2^{r}

Second round
(Austria) S Kraus	3	6	6
(Italy) T Pieri	6	3	4
Q	(Germany) S Herrmann	0	3
8	E Pridankina	6	6
4	(Turkey) B Cengiz	6	2	6
Q	(Poland) W Falkowska	3	6	4
WC	(Austria) A Pircher	2	2
Q	V Kan	6	6

Quarterfinals
(Austria) S Kraus	6^{7}	3
8	E Pridankina	7^{9}	6
4	(Turkey) B Cengiz	6	6
Q	V Kan	3	1

Semifinals
8	E Pridankina	6	7
4	(Turkey) B Cengiz	1	5

=== Bottom half ===
First round
7	(Germany) N Noha Akugue	7	6
(Hungary) A Tóth	5	1
(Germany) S Wagner	6	3
(Germany) C Kuhl	3	2^{r}
Q	(Slovakia) R Jamrichová	7	2	4
(Serbia) M Ristić	5	6	6
A Ibragimova	7	4	4
3	(Lithuania) J Mikulskytė	5	6	6
6	(Serbia) D Radanović	7^{8}	4	1^{r}
Q	(Germany) M Hodzic	6^{6}	6	3
Q	(Netherlands) RM Nijkamp	1	3
(Ukraine) V Strakhova	6	6
(Netherlands) E Vedder	6	4	6
(Czech Republic) J Malečková	3	6	1
Q	(Italy) V Meliss	3	3
2	(Belgium) H Vandewinkel	6	6

Second round
7	(Germany) N Noha Akugue	6	6
(Germany) S Wagner	0	4
(Serbia) M Ristić	1	7	2
3	(Lithuania) J Mikulskytė	6	5	6
Q	(Germany) M Hodzic	6	3	1
(Ukraine) V Strakhova	2	6	6
(Netherlands) E Vedder	6	7
2	(Belgium) H Vandewinkel	4	5

Quarterfinals
7	(Germany) N Noha Akugue	6	6
3	(Lithuania) J Mikulskytė	4	2
(Ukraine) V Strakhova	6	6
(Netherlands) E Vedder	2	1

Semifinals
7	(Germany) N Noha Akugue	4	6	4
(Ukraine) V Strakhova	6	0	6
