= 2024 Ladies Open Amstetten – Doubles =

Doubles
- 2024 Ladies Open Amstetten

Final
- Champions: (Spain) Yvonne Cavallé Reimers (Netherlands) Eva Vedder
- Runners-up: (Czech Republic) Jesika Malečková (Czech Republic) Miriam Škoch
- Score: 6–3, 6–2

Events
Singles	Doubles
Ladies Open Amstetten	· 2025 →

This was the first edition of the tournament.

Yvonne Cavallé Reimers and Eva Vedder won the title, defeating Jesika Malečková and Miriam Škoch in the final, 6–3, 6–2.

== Seeds ==
1. (Czech Republic) Jesika Malečková / (Czech Republic) Miriam Škoch (final)
2. (Czech Republic) Anastasia Dețiuc / (Poland) Weronika Falkowska (semifinals)
3. (Spain) Yvonne Cavallé Reimers / (Netherlands) Eva Vedder (champions)
4. (Lithuania) Justina Mikulskytė / (Mexico) María Portillo Ramírez (semifinals)

== Draw ==
=== Key ===
- Q = Qualifier
- WC = Wild card
- LL = Lucky loser
- Alt = Alternate
- SE = Special exempt
- PR = Protected ranking
- ITF = ITF entry
- JE = Junior exempt
- w/o = Walkover
- r = Retired
- d = Defaulted
- SR = Special ranking

First round
(Italy) V Meliss (Italy) C Traversi	5	2
A Ibragimova (Hungary) A Tóth	7	6
4	(Lithuania) J Mikulskytė (Mexico) M Portillo Ramírez	3	6	[10]
(Germany) M Hodzic (Bulgaria) J Stamatova	6	3	[6]
(Turkey) B Cengiz; E Pridankina	6	6
(Austria) L Gruber (Austria) C Semmelmeyer	0	0
(Germany) T Morderger (Germany) Y Morderger	6	6
(Slovakia) V Lacková (Austria) Z Sopkova	0	1
(Germany) C Kuhl (Netherlands) RM Nijkamp
3	(Spain) Y Cavallé Reimers (Netherlands) E Vedder	w/o
(Austria) C Gasparovic (Austria) LM Rothensteiner	6	6
(Ukraine) M Kostyuk (Austria) A Schüller	2	2
(Austria) M Klaffner (Austria) T Kostic	0	1
2	(Czech Republic) A Dețiuc (Poland) W Falkowska	6	6

Quarterfinals
1	(Czech Republic) J Malečková (Czech Republic) M Škoch	6	3	[10]
A Ibragimova (Hungary) A Tóth	3	6	[2]
4	(Lithuania) J Mikulskytė (Mexico) M Portillo Ramírez	7^{7}	6
(Turkey) B Cengiz; E Pridankina	6^{2}	2
(Germany) T Morderger (Germany) Y Morderger	3	4
3	(Spain) Y Cavallé Reimers (Netherlands) E Vedder	6	6
(Austria) C Gasparovic (Austria) LM Rothensteiner	1	7	[5]
2	(Czech Republic) A Dețiuc (Poland) W Falkowska	6	5	[10]

Semifinals
1	(Czech Republic) J Malečková (Czech Republic) M Škoch	6	6
4	(Lithuania) J Mikulskytė (Mexico) M Portillo Ramírez	1	3
3	(Spain) Y Cavallé Reimers (Netherlands) E Vedder	6	6
2	(Czech Republic) A Dețiuc (Poland) W Falkowska	3	3

Final
1	(Czech Republic) J Malečková (Czech Republic) M Škoch	3	2
3	(Spain) Y Cavallé Reimers (Netherlands) E Vedder	6	6
