= 2026 Ankara Open – Doubles =

Doubles
- 2026 Ankara Open

Final
- Champions: (Poland) Weronika Falkowska (United States) Alana Smith
- Runners-up: (Slovenia) Dalila Jakupović (Switzerland) Naïma Karamoko
- Score: 6–2, 7–6^{(7–2)}

Details
- Draw: 16 (2WC)
- Seeds: 4

Events
| Singles | Doubles |
- Ankara Open

This was the first edition of the tournament.

Weronika Falkowska and Alana Smith won the title, defeating Dalila Jakupović and Naïma Karamoko 6–2, 7–6^{(7–2)} in the final.

== Seeds ==
1. Elena Pridankina / Anastasia Tikhonova (quarterfinals)
2. (Slovenia) Dalila Jakupović / (Switzerland) Naïma Karamoko (final)
3. (Netherlands) Isabelle Haverlag / (Poland) Martyna Kubka (semifinals)
4. (Poland) Weronika Falkowska / (United States) Alana Smith (champions)

== Draw ==
Key

- Q = Qualifier
- WC = Wild card
- LL = Lucky loser
- Alt = Alternate
- ITF = ITF entry
- PR = Protected ranking
- SR = Special ranking
- SE = Special exempt
- JE = Junior exempt
- JR = Junior Accelerator Programme entrant
- CO = College Accelerator Programme entrant
- NG = Next Gen Accelerator Program entrant
- w/o = Walkover
- r = Retired
- d = Defaulted

=== Draw ===
First round
1 | E Pridankina; A Tikhonova | 6^{5} | 7^{7} | [10]
(Croatia) M Dražić; K Zaytseva | 7^{7} | 6^{3} | [7]
(Serbia) T Kostović (Australia) E Micic | w/o
A Falei; P Iatcenko
4 | (Poland) W Falkowska (United States) A Smith | 7^{7} | 6
(Slovakia) V Hrunčáková (Slovakia) K Kužmová | 6^{0} | 3
WC | (Turkey) AN Altinel; D Egorova | 6 | 6^{3} | [10]
(Romania) ER Bertea; E Yashina | 4 | 7^{7} | [3]
WC | (Turkey) D Arslan (Turkey) S Ulueren | 4 | 4
(United States) F Crawley (United States) J Daniel | 6 | 6
(Turkey) D Dilek (Turkey) A Mert | 1 | 6^{4}
3 | (Netherlands) I Haverlag (Poland) M Kubka | 6 | 7^{7}
(Australia) M Ercan (Japan) Y Naito
(France) C Monnet (Argentina) J Riera | w/o
(United States) C Ansari (Bulgaria) I Shinikova | 3 | 5
2 | (Slovenia) D Jakupović (Switzerland) N Karamoko | 6 | 7

Quarterfinals
1 | E Pridankina; A Tikhonova | 6^{1} | 4
(Serbia) T Kostović (Australia) E Micic | 7^{7} | 6
4 | (Poland) W Falkowska (United States) A Smith | 6 | 6
WC | (Turkey) AN Altinel; D Egorova | 3 | 2
(United States) F Crawley (United States) J Daniel | 7 | 2 | [5]
3 | (Netherlands) I Haverlag (Poland) M Kubka | 5 | 6 | [10]
(France) C Monnet (Argentina) J Riera | 4 | 6 | [8]
2 | (Slovenia) D Jakupović (Switzerland) N Karamoko | 6 | 2 | [10]

Semifinals
(Serbia) T Kostović (Australia) E Micic | 7 | 4 | [8]
4 | (Poland) W Falkowska (United States) A Smith | 5 | 6 | [10]
3 | (Netherlands) I Haverlag (Poland) M Kubka | 4 | 3
2 | (Slovenia) D Jakupović (Switzerland) N Karamoko | 6 | 6

Final
4 | (Poland) W Falkowska (United States) A Smith | 6 | 7^{7}
2 | (Slovenia) D Jakupović (Switzerland) N Karamoko | 2 | 6^{2}
