= 2025 Ladies Open Amstetten – Doubles =

Doubles
- 2025 Ladies Open Amstetten

Final
- Champions: (China) Feng Shuo (Chinese Taipei) Liang En-shuo
- Runners-up: (Slovenia) Dalila Jakupović (Slovenia) Nika Radišić
- Score: 4–6, 6–4, [10–0]

Events
Singles	Doubles
← 2024 ·	Ladies Open Amstetten	· 2026 →

Yvonne Cavallé Reimers and Eva Vedder were the defending champions, but they chose not to compete this year.

Feng Shuo and Liang En-shuo won the title, defeating Dalila Jakupović and Nika Radišić in the final, 4–6, 6–4, [10–0].

== Seeds ==
1. (China) Feng Shuo / (Chinese Taipei) Liang En-shuo (champions)
2. Amina Anshba / (Bulgaria) Lia Karatancheva (first round)
3. (United Kingdom) Freya Christie / (Bosnia and Herzegovina) Anita Wagner (first round)
4. (Slovenia) Dalila Jakupović / (Slovenia) Nika Radišić (final)

== Draw ==
=== Key ===
- Q = Qualifier
- WC = Wild card
- LL = Lucky loser
- Alt = Alternate
- ITF = ITF entry
- PR = Protected ranking
- SR = Special ranking
- SE = Special exempt
- JE = Junior exempt
- JR = Junior Accelerator Programme entrant
- CO = College Accelerator Programme entrant
- NG = Next Gen Accelerator Program entrant
- w/o = Walkover
- r = Retired
- d = Defaulted

=== Draw ===
First round
1	(China) S Feng (Chinese Taipei) E-s Liang	6	6^{2}	[10]
(Slovakia) N Daubnerová (Slovakia) R Zelníčková	0	7^{7}	[7]
(Germany) T Morderger (Germany) Y Morderger	1	6	[2]
(Hungary) A Nagy (Netherlands) RM Nijkamp	6	2	[10]
3	(United Kingdom) F Christie (Bosnia and Herzegovina) A Wagner	3	3
(Slovenia) K Novak (Czech Republic) I Šebestová	6	6
(Czech Republic) K Kubáňová (Czech Republic) A Laboutková	6	6
WC	(Austria) S Auer (Austria) C Semmelmeyer	0	0
(Switzerland) N Gadient (Serbia) M Mašić	0	0
(Poland) W Falkowska (Sweden) L Zaar	6	6
WC	(Austria) L Gruber (Austria) EL Picorusevic	2	2
4	(Slovenia) D Jakupović (Slovenia) N Radišić	6	6
(Czech Republic) M Bayerlová (India) R Bhatia	6^{5}	6	[12]
(Austria) LM Rothensteiner (Austria) A Schüller	7^{7}	3	[10]
(Italy) E Chiesa (Italy) V Meliss	5	7^{8}	[10]
2	A Anshba (Bulgaria) L Karatancheva	7	6^{6}	[8]

Quarterfinals
1	(China) S Feng (Chinese Taipei) E-s Liang	7^{13}	6
(Hungary) A Nagy (Netherlands) RM Nijkamp	6^{11}	2
(Slovenia) K Novak (Czech Republic) I Šebestová	4	4
(Czech Republic) K Kubáňová (Czech Republic) A Laboutková	6	6
(Poland) W Falkowska (Sweden) L Zaar	2	6	[7]
4	(Slovenia) D Jakupović (Slovenia) N Radišić	6	3	[10]
(Czech Republic) M Bayerlová (India) R Bhatia	4	6	[11]
(Italy) E Chiesa (Italy) V Meliss	6	2	[9]

Semifinals
1	(China) S Feng (Chinese Taipei) E-s Liang	1	6	[10]
(Czech Republic) K Kubáňová (Czech Republic) A Laboutková	6	2	[5]
4	(Slovenia) D Jakupović (Slovenia) N Radišić	6	6
(Czech Republic) M Bayerlová (India) R Bhatia	4	1

Final
1	(China) S Feng (Chinese Taipei) E-s Liang	4	6	[10]
4	(Slovenia) D Jakupović (Slovenia) N Radišić	6	4	[0]
