= 2026 Ankara Open – Singles =

Singles
- 2026 Ankara Open

Final
- Champion: (Turkey) Berfu Cengiz
- Runner-up: (Serbia) Teodora Kostović
- Score: 2–6, 6–4, 7–5

Details
- Draw: 32 (4Q / 4WC)
- Seeds: 8

Events
Singles	Doubles
- Ankara Open

This was the first edition of the tournament.

Berfu Cengiz won the title, defeating Teodora Kostović 2–6, 6–4, 7–5 in the final.

== Seeds ==
1. (Argentina) Solana Sierra (first round)
2. Polina Iatcenko (semifinals)
3. (Argentina) Julia Riera (first round)
4. (Poland) Martyna Kubka (first round)
5. (Serbia) Teodora Kostović (final)
6. Anastasia Gasanova (quarterfinals)
7. Elena Pridankina (second round)
8. Julia Avdeeva (withdrew)
9. (Turkey) Ayla Aksu (second round)

== Draw ==
Key

- Q = Qualifier
- WC = Wild card
- LL = Lucky loser
- Alt = Alternate
- ITF = ITF entry
- PR = Protected ranking
- SR = Special ranking
- SE = Special exempt
- JE = Junior exempt
- JR = Junior Accelerator Programme entrant
- CO = College Accelerator Programme entrant
- NG = Next Gen Accelerator Program entrant
- w/o = Walkover
- r = Retired
- d = Defaulted

=== Finals ===
Semifinals
WC	(Turkey) Deniz Dilek	1	1
(Turkey) Berfu Cengiz	6	6
5	(Serbia) Teodora Kostović	7	7
2	Polina Iatcenko	5	5

Final
(Turkey) Berfu Cengiz	2	6	7
5	(Serbia) Teodora Kostović	6	4	5

=== Top half ===
First round
1	(Argentina) S Sierra	3	3
WC	(Turkey) D Dilek	6	6
(Slovakia) K Kužmová	6	4	4
WC	(Turkey) Ç Büyükakçay	2	6	6
(United States) F Crawley	1	6^{4}
(France) C Monnet	6	7^{7}
A Tikhonova	2	4
6	A Gasanova	6	6
4	(Poland) M Kubka	2	4
(Turkey) B Cengiz	6	6
WC	(Turkey) A Mert	4	6	6
(Bulgaria) I Shinikova	6	1	3
WC	(Turkey) AN Altinel	1	1
(China) H Shi	6	6
(Japan) Y Naito	1	6^{3}
9	(Turkey) A Aksu	6	7^{7}

Second round
WC	(Turkey) D Dilek	6	2	6
WC	(Turkey) Ç Büyükakçay	1	6	2
(France) C Monnet	2	1
6	A Gasanova	6	6
(Turkey) B Cengiz	7^{7}	6
WC	(Turkey) A Mert	6^{2}	2
(China) H Shi	6	5	6
9	(Turkey) A Aksu	1	7	2

Quarterfinals
WC	(Turkey) D Dilek	4	6	7
6	A Gasanova	6	2	5
(Turkey) B Cengiz	6	6
(China) H Shi	3	4

Semifinals
WC	(Turkey) D Dilek	1	1
(Turkey) B Cengiz	6	6

=== Bottom half ===
First round
5	(Serbia) T Kostović	6	6
(United States) C Ansari	3	1
Q	(Germany) M Vogt	1	6	6^{5}
(Romania) ER Bertea	6	2	7^{7}
A Falei	2	6^{2}
(China) F Tian	6	7^{7}
(Australia) E Micic	6	6
3	(Argentina) J Riera	1	3
7	E Pridankina	7^{7}	1	7
Q	D Egorova	6^{5}	6	5
(North Macedonia) L Gjorcheska	7	3	4
LL	K Zaytseva	5	6	6
Q	(Poland) W Falkowska	6	6
Q	(Turkey) İ Yörük	2	0
(Slovakia) V Hrunčáková	6	3	3
2	P Iatcenko	4	6	6

Second round
5	(Serbia) T Kostović	6	6
(Romania) ER Bertea	3	1
(China) F Tian	6	7
(Australia) E Micic	2	5
7	E Pridankina	6	6^{4}	1
LL	K Zaytseva	2	7^{7}	6
Q	(Poland) W Falkowska	3	4
2	P Iatcenko	6	6

Quarterfinals
5	(Serbia) T Kostović	6	7
(China) F Tian	0	5
LL	K Zaytseva	3	2
2	P Iatcenko	6	6

Semifinals
5	(Serbia) T Kostović	7	7
2	P Iatcenko	5	5

== Qualifying ==
=== Seeds ===
1. (Poland) Weronika Falkowska (qualified)
2. Daria Egorova (qualified)
3. Ksenia Zaytseva (qualifying competition, lucky loser)
4. (Germany) Marie Vogt (qualified)
5. (United States) Alana Smith (qualifying competition)
6. Ekaterina Yashina (qualifying competition)
7. (Australia) Melisa Ercan (qualifying competition)
8. (Turkey) İlay Yörük (qualified)

=== Qualifiers ===
1. (Poland) Weronika Falkowska
2. Daria Egorova
3. (Turkey) İlay Yörük
4. (Germany) Marie Vogt

=== Lucky loser ===
1. Ksenia Zaytseva

=== Qualifying draw ===
==== First qualifier ====
First round				Qualifying competition
				1	(Poland) Weronika Falkowska	6	6
				5	(United States) Alana Smith	3	3
WC	(Turkey) Duru Arslan	3	2	5	(United States) Alana Smith	3	3
5	(United States) Alana Smith	6	6

==== Second qualifier ====
First round				Qualifying competition
				2	Daria Egorova	7	6
				7	(Australia) Melisa Ercan	5	1
	(Italy) Giulia Alessia Monteleone	2	0	7	(Australia) Melisa Ercan	5	1
7	(Australia) Melisa Ercan	6	6

==== Third qualifier ====
First round
3	Ksenia Zaytseva	6	6
(Japan) Naoko Eto	0	0
WC	(Turkey) Sude Ulueren	1	0
8	(Turkey) İlay Yörük	6	6

Qualifying competition
3	Ksenia Zaytseva	6	4	5
8	(Turkey) İlay Yörük	2	6	7

==== Fourth qualifier ====
First round
4	(Germany) Marie Vogt	6	6
(India) Ashmitha Easwaramurthi	1	0
WC	(Turkey) Semra Aksu	2	4
6	Ekaterina Yashina	6	6

Qualifying competition
4	(Germany) Marie Vogt	6	6
6	Ekaterina Yashina	4	2
