= 2025 Miami Open – Women's singles =

Tennis tournament event

Women's singles
- 2025 Miami Open

Final
- Champion: Aryna Sabalenka
- Runner-up: (United States) Jessica Pegula
- Score: 7–5, 6–2

Details
- Draw: 96 (12 Q / 8 WC )
- Seeds: 32

Events
Singles	men	women
Doubles	men	women
- Miami Open

Aryna Sabalenka defeated Jessica Pegula in the final, 7–5, 6–2 to win the women's singles tennis title at the 2025 Miami Open. She did not lose a set en route to her eighth WTA 1000 and 19th career WTA Tour title. The final was a rematch of the 2024 Cincinnati and US Open finals, both of which were also won by Sabalenka.

Danielle Collins was the defending champion, but lost in the fourth round to Sabalenka.

Alexandra Eala became the first Filipina to defeat a top 10 player since the introduction of the WTA rankings in 1975—a feat she achieved twice during the tournament,—the first to reach the semifinals of a WTA Tour event, and the first to enter the top 100 in the rankings. Eala was the third wildcard (after Justine Henin in 2010 and Victoria Azarenka in 2018) to reach the Miami Open semifinals, defeating three major champions to do so (Jeļena Ostapenko, Madison Keys and Iga Świątek).

== Seeds ==
All seeds received a bye into the second round.

1. Aryna Sabalenka (champion)
2. (Poland) Iga Świątek (quarterfinals)
3. (United States) Coco Gauff (fourth round)
4. (United States) Jessica Pegula (final)
5. (United States) Madison Keys (third round)
6. (Italy) Jasmine Paolini (semifinals)
7. (Kazakhstan) Elena Rybakina (second round)
8. (United States) Emma Navarro (second round)
9. (China) Zheng Qinwen (quarterfinals)
10. (Spain) Paula Badosa (fourth round, withdrew)
11. Mirra Andreeva (third round)
12. Daria Kasatkina (second round)
13. Diana Shnaider (second round)
14. (United States) Danielle Collins (fourth round)
15. (Czech Republic) Karolína Muchová (third round)
16. (Brazil) Beatriz Haddad Maia (second round)
17. (United States) Amanda Anisimova (fourth round)
18. Ekaterina Alexandrova (second round)
19. (Kazakhstan) Yulia Putintseva (second round)
20. (Denmark) Clara Tauson (third round)
21. (Croatia) Donna Vekić (second round)
22. (Ukraine) Elina Svitolina (fourth round)
23. (Ukraine) Marta Kostyuk (fourth round)
24. Liudmila Samsonova (second round)
25. (Latvia) Jeļena Ostapenko (second round)
26. (Canada) Leylah Fernandez (third round)
27. (Belgium) Elise Mertens (third round)
28. (Greece) Maria Sakkari (third round)
29. (Poland) Magdalena Fręch (second round)
30. (Czech Republic) Linda Nosková (second round)
31. (Tunisia) Ons Jabeur (third round, retired)
32. Anna Kalinskaya (third round)

Click on the seed number of a player to go to their draw section.

== Draw ==
Key

- Q = Qualifier
- WC = Wild card
- LL = Lucky loser
- Alt = Alternate
- ITF = ITF entry
- PR = Protected ranking
- SR = Special ranking
- SE = Special exempt
- JE = Junior exempt
- JR = Junior Accelerator Programme entrant
- CO = College Accelerator Programme entrant
- NG = Next Gen Accelerator Program entrant
- w/o = Walkover
- r = Retired
- d = Defaulted

=== Finals ===
Quarterfinals
1	Aryna Sabalenka	6	7
9	(China) Zheng Qinwen	2	5
(Poland) Magda Linette	3	2
6	(Italy) Jasmine Paolini	6	6
(United Kingdom) Emma Raducanu	4	7^{7}	2
4	(United States) Jessica Pegula	6	6^{3}	6
WC	(Philippines) Alexandra Eala	6	7
2	(Poland) Iga Świątek	2	5

Semifinals
1	Aryna Sabalenka	6	6
6	(Italy) Jasmine Paolini	2	2
4	(United States) Jessica Pegula	7^{7}	5	6
WC	(Philippines) Alexandra Eala	6^{3}	7	3

Final
1	Aryna Sabalenka	7	6
4	(United States) Jessica Pegula	5	2

=== Top half ===
==== Section 1 ====
First round
(Bulgaria) V Tomova	6	2	6
PR	(United States) C McNally	3	6	3
Q	(Romania) E-G Ruse	6	6^{5}	6
P Kudermetova	1	7^{7}	2
Q	(Switzerland) R Masarova	6^{4}	6	7
Q	(Belgium) G Minnen	7^{7}	4	5
PR	(Romania) S Cîrstea	6	7^{7}
(Italy) E Cocciaretto	3	6^{5}

Second round
1	A Sabalenka	6	6
(Bulgaria) V Tomova	3	0
Q	(Romania) E-G Ruse	6	6
29	(Poland) M Fręch	4	4
21	(Croatia) D Vekić	1	3
Q	(Switzerland) R Masarova	6	6
PR	(Romania) S Cîrstea	4	6^{3}
14	(United States) D Collins	6	7^{7}

Third round
1	A Sabalenka	6	0
Q	(Romania) E-G Ruse	1	0^{r}
Q	(Switzerland) R Masarova	4	6	3
14	(United States) D Collins	6	3	6

Fourth round
1	A Sabalenka	6	6
14	(United States) D Collins	4	4

==== Section 2 ====
First round
PR	(United States) L Davis	6	3	6
Q	(Japan) A Ito	4	6	4
Q	(United States) T Townsend	3	6	6
(United States) A Li	6	4	2
(France) V Gracheva	6	6^{0}	3
(United States) A Parks	3	7^{7}	6
(Mexico) R Zarazúa	3	2
(United States) A Krueger	6	6

Second round
9	(China) Q Zheng	6	7
PR	(United States) L Davis	1	5
Q	(United States) T Townsend	7^{7}	1	6
19	(Kazakhstan) Y Putintseva	6^{2}	6	1
26	(Canada) L Fernandez	7^{7}	6
(United States) A Parks	6^{1}	3
(United States) A Krueger	6	2	6
7	(Kazakhstan) E Rybakina	4	6	4

Third round
9	(China) Q Zheng	6	7^{7}
Q	(United States) T Townsend	1	6^{3}
26	(Canada) L Fernandez	1	5
(United States) A Krueger	6	7

Fourth round
9	(China) Q Zheng	6	7^{7}
(United States) A Krueger	2	6^{3}

==== Section 3 ====
First round
WC	(Czech Republic) P Kvitová	4	5
(United States) S Kenin	6	7
(Spain) J Bouzas Maneiro	4	3
(Italy) L Bronzetti	6	6
A Pavlyuchenkova	6^{3}	2
(Poland) M Linette	7^{7}	6
Q	(United States) C Liu	5	6	3
Q	(Czech Republic) L Fruhvirtová	7	4	6

Second round
3	(United States) C Gauff	6	6
(United States) S Kenin	0	0
(Italy) L Bronzetti	3	7	4
28	(Greece) M Sakkari	6	5	6
18	E Alexandrova	6^{5}	2
(Poland) M Linette	7^{7}	6
Q	(Czech Republic) L Fruhvirtová	6	6
16	(Brazil) B Haddad Maia	0	2

Third round
3	(United States) C Gauff	6	6
28	(Greece) M Sakkari	2	4
(Poland) M Linette	7	6
Q	(Czech Republic) L Fruhvirtová	5	4

Fourth round
3	(United States) C Gauff	4	4
(Poland) M Linette	6	6

==== Section 4 ====
First round
(Serbia) O Danilović	3	7^{7}	1
WC	(United States) H Baptiste	6	6^{5}	6
(Japan) N Osaka	3	6	6
Q	(Ukraine) Y Starodubtseva	6	4	3
(China) Y Yuan	2	6	6^{4}
(Czech Republic) K Siniaková	6	2	7^{7}
Q	(Italy) L Stefanini	6	1	3
(Slovakia) R Šramková	3	6	6

Second round
12	D Kasatkina	6	4	5
WC	(United States) H Baptiste	3	6	7
(Japan) N Osaka	6	6
24	L Samsonova	2	4
31	(Tunisia) O Jabeur	6	7^{9}
(Czech Republic) K Siniaková	4	6^{7}
(Slovakia) R Šramková	4	4
6	(Italy) J Paolini	6	6

Third round
WC	(United States) H Baptiste	6^{6}	6	4
(Japan) N Osaka	7^{8}	3	6
31	(Tunisia) O Jabeur	3^{r}
6	(Italy) J Paolini	4

Fourth round
(Japan) N Osaka	6	4	4
6	(Italy) J Paolini	3	6	6

=== Bottom half ===
==== Section 5 ====
First round
WC	(Japan) S Ishii	2	1
(United Kingdom) E Raducanu	6	6
(United States) M Kessler	6	2	6
(Czech Republic) M Bouzková	4	6	4
(Egypt) M Sherif	7	1	6
(New Zealand) L Sun	5	6	4
V Kudermetova	6	7^{7}
(China) Xin Wang	2	6^{5}

Second round
8	(United States) E Navarro	6^{6}	6	6^{3}
(United Kingdom) E Raducanu	7^{8}	2	7^{7}
(United States) M Kessler	2	7	7^{7}
30	(Czech Republic) L Nosková	6	5	6^{4}
17	(United States) A Anisimova	6	6
(Egypt) M Sherif	2	2
V Kudermetova	0	2
11	M Andreeva	6	6

Third round
(United Kingdom) E Raducanu	6	3
(United States) M Kessler	1	0^{r}
17	(United States) A Anisimova	7^{7}	2	6
11	M Andreeva	6^{5}	6	3

Fourth round
(United Kingdom) E Raducanu	6	6
17	(United States) A Anisimova	1	3

==== Section 6 ====
First round
K Rakhimova	6	3	2
A Blinkova	4	6	6
A Potapova	6	3	6^{5}
Q	(Australia) K Birrell	3	6	7^{7}
(Netherlands) S Lamens	4	3
(Japan) M Uchijima	6	6
WC	(Australia) A Tomljanović	3	2
Q	(United States) B Pera	6	6

Second round
13	D Shnaider	4	6^{0}
A Blinkova	6	7^{7}
Q	(Australia) K Birrell	5	6	3
23	(Ukraine) M Kostyuk	7	4	6
32	A Kalinskaya	6	6
(Japan) M Uchijima	1	3
Q	(United States) B Pera	4	4
4	(United States) J Pegula	6	6

Third round
A Blinkova	2	1
23	(Ukraine) M Kostyuk	6	6
32	A Kalinskaya	7^{7}	2	6^{3}
4	(United States) J Pegula	6^{3}	6	7^{7}

Fourth round
23	(Ukraine) M Kostyuk	2	3
4	(United States) J Pegula	6	6

==== Section 7 ====
First round
WC	E Andreeva	1	7^{7}	4
(Armenia) E Avanesyan	6	6^{4}	6
WC	(Philippines) A Eala	6	7^{7}
(United States) K Volynets	3	6^{3}
WC	(United States) TC Grant	4	4
PR	(Austria) J Grabher	6	6
(Colombia) C Osorio	5	7	3
WC	(Canada) V Mboko	7	5	6

Second round
5	(United States) M Keys	6	6
(Armenia) E Avanesyan	3	3
WC	(Philippines) A Eala	7^{7}	7
25	(Latvia) J Ostapenko	6^{2}	5
20	(Denmark) C Tauson	6	7
PR	(Austria) J Grabher	4	5
WC	(Canada) V Mboko	5	6	6^{3}
10	(Spain) P Badosa	7	1	7^{7}

Third round
5	(United States) M Keys	4	2
WC	(Philippines) A Eala	6	6
20	(Denmark) C Tauson	3	6^{3}
10	(Spain) P Badosa	6	7^{7}

Fourth round
WC	(Philippines) A Eala	w/o
10	(Spain) P Badosa

==== Section 8 ====
First round
(Ukraine) A Kalinina	3	1
V Azarenka	6	6
(Ukraine) D Yastremska	4	6	5
(Switzerland) B Bencic	6	1	7
(United Kingdom) K Boulter	4	2
(United States) P Stearns	6	6
(France) C Garcia	6	7^{7}
Q	(Hungary) A Bondár	0	6^{5}

Second round
15	(Czech Republic) K Muchová	6	0
V Azarenka	0	0^{r}
(Switzerland) B Bencic	1	2
22	(Ukraine) E Svitolina	6	6
27	(Belgium) E Mertens	6	6
(United States) P Stearns	4	1
(France) C Garcia	2	5
2	(Poland) I Świątek	6	7

Third round
15	(Czech Republic) K Muchová	2	6	2
22	(Ukraine) E Svitolina	6	3	6
27	(Belgium) E Mertens	6^{2}	1
2	(Poland) I Świątek	7^{7}	6

Fourth round
22	(Ukraine) E Svitolina	6^{5}	3
2	(Poland) I Świątek	7^{7}	6

== Seeded players ==
The following are the seeded players. Seedings are based on WTA rankings as of 3 March 2025. Rankings and points before are as of 17 March 2025.

Under the 2025 Rulebook, points from six of the seven combined WTA 1000 tournaments (which include Miami) are required to be counted in a player's ranking.

^{‡}	Champion
^{†}	Runner-up

Seed	Rank	Player	Points before	Points defending	Points earned	Points after	Status
1	1	Aryna Sabalenka ^{‡}	9,606	65	1,000	10,541	Champion, defeated (United States) Jessica Pegula [4]
2	2	(Poland) Iga Świątek	7,375	120	215	7,470	Quarterfinals lost to (Philippines) Alexandra Eala [WC]
3	3	(United States) Coco Gauff	6,063	120	120	6,063	Fourth round lost to (Poland) Magda Linette
4	4	(United States) Jessica Pegula ^{†}	5,361	215	650	5,796	Runner-up, lost to Aryna Sabalenka [1]
5	5	(United States) Madison Keys	5,004	120	65	4,949	Third round lost to (Philippines) Alexandra Eala [WC]
6	7	(Italy) Jasmine Paolini	4,518	65	390	4,843	Semifinals lost to Aryna Sabalenka [1]
7	8	(Kazakhstan) Elena Rybakina	4,448	650	10	3,808	Second round lost to (United States) Ashlyn Krueger
8	10	(United States) Emma Navarro	3,859	120	10	3,749	Second round lost to (United Kingdom) Emma Raducanu
9	9	(China) Zheng Qinwen	3,985	65	215	4,135	Quarterfinals lost to Aryna Sabalenka [1]
10	11	(Spain) Paula Badosa	3,736	35	120	3,821	Fourth round withdrew due to lower back injury
11	6	Mirra Andreeva	4,710	0	65	4,775	Third round lost to (United States) Amanda Anisimova [17]
12	12	Daria Kasatkina	3,061	65	10	3,006	Second round lost to (United States) Hailey Baptiste [WC]
13	13	Diana Shnaider	2,938	35	10	2,913	Second round lost to Anna Blinkova
14	15	(United States) Danielle Collins	2,853	1,000	120	1,973	Fourth round lost to Aryna Sabalenka [1]
15	14	(Czech Republic) Karolína Muchová	2,854	(0)^{†}	65	2,919	Third round lost to (Ukraine) Elina Svitolina [22]
16	18	(Brazil) Beatriz Haddad Maia	2,314	65	10	2,259	Second round lost to (Czech Republic) Linda Fruhvirtová [Q]
17	17	(United States) Amanda Anisimova	2,335	(1)^{‡}	120	2,454	Fourth round lost to (United Kingdom) Emma Raducanu
18	20	Ekaterina Alexandrova	2,158	390	10	1,778	Second round lost to (Poland) Magda Linette
19	24	(Kazakhstan) Yulia Putintseva	2,028	215	10	1,823	Second round lost to (United States) Taylor Townsend [Q]
20	23	(Denmark) Clara Tauson	2,114	65	65	2,114	Third round lost to (Spain) Paula Badosa [10]
21	19	(Croatia) Donna Vekić	2,166	35	10	2,141	Second round lost (Switzerland) Rebeka Masarova [Q]
22	22	(Ukraine) Elina Svitolina	2,130	10	120	2,240	Fourth round lost to (Poland) Iga Świątek [2]
23	29	(Ukraine) Marta Kostyuk	1,685	0	120	1,805	Fourth round lost to (United States) Jessica Pegula [4]
24	21	Liudmila Samsonova	2,150	10	10	2,150	Second round lost to (Japan) Naomi Osaka
25	25	(Latvia) Jeļena Ostapenko	1,842	65	10	1,787	Second round lost to (Philippines) Alexandra Eala [WC]
26	26	(Canada) Leylah Fernandez	1,763	65	65	1,763	Third round lost to (United States) Ashlyn Krueger
27	28	(Belgium) Elise Mertens	1,701	10	65	1,756	Third round lost to (Poland) Iga Świątek [2]
28	51	(Greece) Maria Sakkari	1,134	215	65	984	Third round lost to (United States) Coco Gauff [3]
29	27	(Poland) Magdalena Fręch	1,712	10	10	1,712	Second round lost to (Romania) Elena-Gabriela Ruse [Q]
30	31	(Czech Republic) Linda Nosková	1,628	65	10	1,573	Second round lost to (United States) McCartney Kessler
31	30	(Tunisia) Ons Jabeur	1,669	10	65	1,724	Third round retired against (Italy) Jasmine Paolini [6]
32	33	Anna Kalinskaya	1,579	120	65	1,524	Third round lost to (United States) Jessica Pegula [4]

† The player withdrew from the 2024 tournament but was not required to carry a 0-point penalty in her ranking due to a long-term injury exemption. Points from her 18th best result will be deducted instead.
‡ The player did not qualify for the 2024 tournament. Points from her 18th best result will be deducted instead.

=== Withdrawn seeded players ===
The following player would have been seeded, but withdrew before the tournament began.

Rank	Player	Points before	Points dropping	Points after	Withdrawal reason
16	(Czech Republic) Barbora Krejčíková	2,675	(0)^{†}	2,675	Back injury

† The player missed the 2024 tournament but was not required to carry a 0-point penalty in her ranking due to a long-term injury exemption. Points from her 18th best result will be deducted instead.

== Other entry information ==
=== Wildcards ===
- Erika Andreeva
- (United States) Hailey Baptiste
- (Philippines) Alexandra Eala
- (United States) Tyra Caterina Grant
- (Japan) Sayaka Ishii
- (Czech Republic) Petra Kvitová
- (Canada) Victoria Mboko
- (Australia) Ajla Tomljanović

=== Protected ranking ===
- (Romania) Sorana Cîrstea
- (United States) Lauren Davis
- (Austria) Julia Grabher
- (United States) Caty McNally

=== Withdrawals ===
- ‡ (Czech Republic) Barbora Krejčíková → replaced by Anna Blinkova
- ‡ (Czech Republic) Markéta Vondroušová → replaced by (Austria) Julia Grabher

‡ – withdrew from entry list
§ – withdrew from main draw

== Qualifying ==
=== Seeds ===
1. (United States) Caroline Dolehide (first round)
2. (Romania) Irina-Camelia Begu (qualifying competition)
3. (Australia) Kimberly Birrell (qualified)
4. (Turkey) Zeynep Sönmez (first round)
5. (Germany) Eva Lys (qualifying competition)
6. (Romania) Jaqueline Cristian (withdrew)
7. (United States) Bernarda Pera (qualified)
8. (United Kingdom) Sonay Kartal (qualifying competition)
9. (Germany) Laura Siegemund (qualifying competition)
10. (Australia) Maya Joint (qualifying competition)
11. (Germany) Tatjana Maria (qualifying competition)
12. (Belgium) Greet Minnen (qualified)
13. (United States) Taylor Townsend (qualified)
14. (Spain) Sara Sorribes Tormo (qualifying competition)
15. (Spain) Cristina Bucșa (first round)
16. (Hungary) Anna Bondár (qualified)
17. (Australia) Olivia Gadecki (first round)
18. (Romania) Elena-Gabriela Ruse (qualified)
19. (United States) Robin Montgomery (qualifying competition)
20. (Canada) Rebecca Marino (first round)
21. (Australia) Daria Saville (first round)
22. (Ukraine) Yuliia Starodubtseva (qualified)
23. (Japan) Aoi Ito (qualified)
24. (Thailand) Mananchaya Sawangkaew (first round)

=== Qualifiers ===
1. (United States) Claire Liu
2. (Hungary) Anna Bondár
3. (Australia) Kimberly Birrell
4. (Romania) Elena-Gabriela Ruse
5. (Japan) Aoi Ito
6. (Italy) Lucrezia Stefanini
7. (United States) Bernarda Pera
8. (United States) Taylor Townsend
9. (Czech Republic) Linda Fruhvirtová
10. (Switzerland) Rebeka Masarova
11. (Ukraine) Yuliia Starodubtseva
12. (Belgium) Greet Minnen

=== Qualifying draw ===
==== First qualifier ====
First round
1	(United States) Caroline Dolehide	6	6^{2}	2
(United States) Claire Liu	2	7^{7}	6
WC	(Austria) Lilli Tagger	7^{7}	1	1
14	(Spain) Sara Sorribes Tormo	6^{1}	6	6

Qualifying competition
(United States) Claire Liu	7^{7}	6
14	(Spain) Sara Sorribes Tormo	6^{4}	3

==== Second qualifier ====
First round
2	(Romania) Irina-Camelia Begu	6	6
WC	(Japan) Wakana Sonobe	3	1
(Australia) Maddison Inglis	6	3	2
15	(Hungary) Anna Bondár	3	6	6

Qualifying competition
2	(Romania) Irina-Camelia Begu	3	6	6^{5}
15	(Hungary) Anna Bondár	6	2	7^{7}

==== Third qualifier ====
First round
3	(Australia) Kimberly Birrell	6	6
Aliaksandra Sasnovich	4	3
(United Kingdom) Harriet Dart	2	6	7
21	(Australia) Daria Saville	6	1	5

Qualifying competition
3	(Australia) Kimberly Birrell	6	6
(United Kingdom) Harriet Dart	4	3

==== Fourth qualifier ====
First round
4	(Turkey) Zeynep Sönmez	3	6	1
(Japan) Ena Shibahara	6	1	6
PR	(Sweden) Mirjam Björklund	6	4	3
18	(Romania) Elena-Gabriela Ruse	2	6	6

Qualifying competition
(Japan) Ena Shibahara	6	1	5
18	(Romania) Elena-Gabriela Ruse	4	6	7

==== Fifth qualifier ====
First round
5	(Germany) Eva Lys	7	6
(Croatia) Petra Martić	5	3
WC	(France) Ksenia Efremova	2	3
23	(Japan) Aoi Ito	6	6

Qualifying competition
5	(Germany) Eva Lys	6	4	2
23	(Japan) Aoi Ito	4	6	6

==== Sixth qualifier ====
First round
Alt	(United States) Louisa Chirico	4	0^{r}
PR	(Belgium) Ysaline Bonaventure	6	3
(Italy) Lucrezia Stefanini	6	1	6
15	(Spain) Cristina Bucșa	4	6	3

Qualifying competition
PR	(Belgium) Ysaline Bonaventure	3	1
(Italy) Lucrezia Stefanini	6	6

==== Seventh qualifier ====
First round
7	(United States) Bernarda Pera	5	6	6
(Canada) Marina Stakusic	7	4	4
WC	(Italy) Giorgia Pedone	2	0
19	(United States) Robin Montgomery	6	6

Qualifying competition
7	(United States) Bernarda Pera	7^{7}	6
19	(United States) Robin Montgomery	6^{2}	4

==== Eighth qualifier ====
First round
8	(United Kingdom) Sonay Kartal	6^{5}	6	0
PR	(United Kingdom) Jodie Burrage	7^{7}	4	0^{r}
Alt	(Canada) Carson Branstine	2	4
13	(United States) Taylor Townsend	6	6

Qualifying competition
8	(United Kingdom) Sonay Kartal	6	6^{2}	5
13	(United States) Taylor Townsend	4	7^{7}	7

==== Ninth qualifier ====
First round
9	(Germany) Laura Siegemund	6	6
PR	(Croatia) Ana Konjuh	2	3
WC	(Czech Republic) Linda Fruhvirtová	6	6
20	(Canada) Rebecca Marino	3	3

Qualifying competition
9	(Germany) Laura Siegemund	1	2
WC	(Czech Republic) Linda Fruhvirtová	6	6

==== Tenth qualifier ====
First round
10	(Australia) Maya Joint	7^{8}	7^{7}
(Italy) Sara Errani	6^{6}	6^{4}
(Switzerland) Rebeka Masarova	3	6	6
24	(Thailand) Mananchaya Sawangkaew	6	4	2

Qualifying competition
10	(Australia) Maya Joint	1	6^{3}
(Switzerland) Rebeka Masarova	6	7^{7}

==== Eleventh qualifier ====
First round
11	(Germany) Tatjana Maria	6	6
(France) Léolia Jeanjean	2	2
(United States) Varvara Lepchenko	7	1	1
22	(Ukraine) Yuliia Starodubtseva	5	6	6

Qualifying competition
11	(Germany) Tatjana Maria	4	3
22	(Ukraine) Yuliia Starodubtseva	6	6

==== Twelfth qualifier ====
First round
12	(Belgium) Greet Minnen	7	6
(Germany) Jule Niemeier	5	1
WC	(Serbia) Teodora Kostović	6	7
17	(Australia) Olivia Gadecki	3	5

Qualifying competition
12	(Belgium) Greet Minnen	6	7^{11}
WC	(Serbia) Teodora Kostović	2	6^{9}
