= Ankara Open =

- 2026 Ankara Open

WTA 125
- Event name: Turk Telecom Ankara Open
- Location: Ankara, Turkey
- Venue: Topspin Tennis Academy Bilkent
- Category: WTA 125
- Surface: Hard
- Draw: 32S/14Q/16D
- Prize money: $115,000

Current champions (2026)
- Singles: (Turkey) Berfu Cengiz
- Doubles: (Poland) Weronika Falkowska (United States) Alana Smith

The Ankara Open is a tournament for professional female tennis players played on outdoor hard courts. The event is classified as a WTA 125 tournament and is held at the Topspin Tennis Academy Bilkent in Ankara, Turkey. It is the first ever WTA event to be staged in the city of Ankara.

== Past finals ==
=== Singles ===
Year	Champion	Runners-up	Score
2026	(Turkey) Berfu Cengiz	(Serbia) Teodora Kostović	2–6, 6–4, 7–5

=== Doubles ===
Year	Champions	Runners-up	Score
2026	(Poland) Weronika Falkowska (United States) Alana Smith	(Slovenia) Dalila Jakupović (Switzerland) Naïma Karamoko	6–2, 7–6^{(7–2)}

== See also ==
- Ankara Cup
