= 2025 Ladies Open Amstetten =

Tennis tournament

- Date: 4–10 August 2024
- Edition: 2nd
- Category: ITF Women's World Tennis Tour
- Prize money: $60,000
- Surface: Clay / Outdoor
- Location: Amstetten, Austria

Champions

Singles
- (Austria) Sinja Kraus

Doubles
- (China) Feng Shuo / (Chinese Taipei) Liang En-shuo
- Ladies Open Amstetten

The 2025 Ladies Open Amstetten was a professional tennis tournament played on outdoor clay courts. It was the second edition of the tournament, which was part of the 2025 ITF Women's World Tennis Tour. It took place in Amstetten, Austria, between 4 and 10 August 2025.

== Champions ==
=== Singles ===
- (Austria) Sinja Kraus def. (Austria) Lilli Tagger, 6–2, 6–4

=== Doubles ===
- (China) Feng Shuo / (Chinese Taipei) Liang En-shuo def. (Slovenia) Dalila Jakupović / (Slovenia) Nika Radišić, 4–6, 6–4, [10–0]

== Singles main draw entrants ==
=== Seeds ===
Country	Player	Rank	Seed
AUT	Julia Grabher	130	1
AUT	Sinja Kraus	148	2
GER	Tamara Korpatsch	155	3
~~SLO~~	~~Tamara Zidanšek~~	~~160~~	~~4~~
UKR	Oleksandra Oliynykova	176	5
CYP	Raluca Șerban	230	6
~~FRA~~	~~Carole Monnet~~	~~231~~	~~7~~
BUL	Lia Karatancheva	263	8

- Rankings are as of 28 July 2025.

=== Other entrants ===
The following players received wildcards into the singles main draw:

- (Austria) Arabella Koller
- (Austria) Ekaterina Perelygina
- (Austria) Liel Marlies Rothensteiner
- (Austria) Lilli Tagger

The following players received entry from the qualifying draw:

- (India) Riya Bhatia
- (Italy) Enola Chiesa
- (Poland) Weronika Ewald
- (Czech Republic) Aneta Laboutková
- (Hungary) Adrienn Nagy
- (Romania) Andreea Prisăcariu
- (Slovenia) Nika Radišić
- (Sweden) Lisa Zaar

The following players received entry as a lucky loser:

- (Italy) Camilla Gennaro
- (Italy) Laura Mair
- (Serbia) Mila Mašić
- (Italy) Verena Meliss
