= Feng Shuo =

Chinese tennis player (born 1998)

Feng Shuo 丰硕
- Country (sports): China
- Born: 15 January 1998 (age 28)
- Plays: Right-handed
- Prize money: $138,294

Singles
- Career record: 120–120
- Career titles: 0
- Highest ranking: No. 547 (1 April 2019)

Doubles
- Career record: 224–135
- Career titles: 2 WTA 125, 17 ITF
- Highest ranking: No. 94 (20 July 2026)
- Current ranking: No. 112 (16 November 2026)
- Last updated on: 18 November 2026.

Feng Shuo (Chinese: 丰硕; pinyin: Fēng Shuò; Mandarin pronunciation: [fə́ŋ ʂwô]; born 15 January 1998) is a female Chinese professional tennis player. Feng has a career-high doubles ranking of world No. 94, achieved on 20 July 2026. She has won two WTA 125 doubles titles and 17 doubles titles on the ITF Circuit.

== Career ==
Feng made her WTA Tour main-draw debut at the 2018 Guangzhou International Women's Open, partnering Kang Jiaqi.

Partnering with Estelle Cascino, she won her first WTA 125 doubles title at the 2025 Palermo Ladies Open, defeating Momoko Kobori and Ayano Shimizu in the final.

== WTA 125 finals ==
=== Doubles: 4 (2 titles, 2 runner-ups) ===
Result	W–L	Date	Tournament	Surface	Partner	Opponents	Score
Win	1–0	Jul 2025	Palermo Ladies Open, Italy	Clay	(France) Estelle Cascino	(Japan) Momoko Kobori (Japan) Ayano Shimizu	6–2, 6–7^{(7)}, [10–7]
Win	2–0	Jul 2026	ATV Tennis Open, Italy	Clay	(France) Estelle Cascino	(Croatia) Lucija Ćirić Bagarić (Slovenia) Nika Radišić	6–4, 6–4
Loss	2–1	Sep 2026	Montreux Ladies Open, Switzerland	Clay	(France) Estelle Cascino	(Argentina) Nicole Fossa Huergo (Czech Republic) Lucie Havlíčková	3–6, 7–6^{(4)}, [8–10]
Loss	2–2	Sep 2026	Ljubljana Open, Slovenia	Clay	(France) Estelle Cascino	(Croatia) Lucija Ćirić Bagarić (Italy) Angelica Moratelli	7–6^{(4)}, 4–6, [5–10]

== ITF Circuit finals ==
=== Doubles: 37 (17 titles, 20 runner-ups) ===
Legend
W100 tournaments
W75 tournaments
W40/50 tournaments
W25/35 tournaments
W15 tournaments

Result	W–L	Date	Tournament	Tier	Surface	Partner	Opponents	Score
Loss	0–1	May 2017	ITF Qujing, China	W25	Hard	(China) Zhao Xiaoxi	(China) Jiang Xinyu (China) Tang Qianhui	4–6, 3–6
Loss	0–2	Jun 2017	ITF Anning, China	W15	Clay	(China) Kang Jiaqi	(China) Sun Xuliu (China) Zang Jiaxue	2–6, 4–6
Win	1–2	Jul 2017	ITF Anning, China	W15	Clay	(China) Li Yihong	(China) Jiang Xinyu (China) Tang Qianhui	6–3, 6–4
Win	2–2	Mar 2018	ITF Nanjing, China	W15	Hard	(China) Zheng Wushuang	(China) Sun Xuliu (China) Zhao Qianqian	6–2, 6–4
Win	3–2	Jun 2018	ITF Changsha, China	W25	Hard	(China) Jiang Xinyu	(China) Han Xinyun (China) Zhang Ying	6–3, 4–6, [11–9]
Win	4–2	Jul 2018	ITF Tianjin, China	W25	Hard	(China) Jiang Xinyu	(China) Chen Jiahui (China) Ye Qiuyu	6–4, 6–4
Loss	4–3	Oct 2018	ITF Nanning, China	W25	Hard	(China) Guo Hanyu	(South Korea) Kim Na-ri (China) Ye Qiuyu	3–6, 0–6
Win	5–3	Jun 2019	ITF Luzhou, China	W25	Hard	(China) Xun Fangying	(China) Guo Hanyu (China) Ye Qiuyu	6–3, 6–1
Win	6–3	Aug 2019	ITF El Espinar, Spain	W25	Hard	(Spain) Marina Bassols Ribera	(Australia) Alexandra Bozovic (Belarus) Shalimar Talbi	7–5, 7–6^{(4)}
Loss	6–4	Aug 2019	ITF Las Palmas, Spain	W25	Clay	(Spain) Marina Bassols Ribera	(Mexico) Victoria Rodríguez (Mexico) Ana Sofía Sánchez	3–6, 5–7
Win	7–4	Aug 2019	ITF Las Palmas	W25	Clay	(Spain) Marina Bassols Ribera	(France) Manon Arcangioli (Belgium) Kimberley Zimmermann	6–3, 6–1
Loss	7–5	Feb 2023	ITF Ipoh, Malaysia	W15	Hard	(China) Guo Hanyu	(Chinese Taipei) Li Yu-yun (Ukraine) Anastasiia Poplavska	5–7, 2–6
Loss	7–6	Mar 2023	ITF Kuching, Malaysia	W15	Hard	(China) Guo Meiqi	(China) Guo Hanyu (Chinese Taipei) Li Yu-yun	2–6, 3–6
Loss	7–7	Jun 2023	ITF Luzhou, China	W25	Hard	(China) Zheng Wushuang	(Chinese Taipei) Li Yu-yun (China) Tang Qianhui	6–7^{(4)}, 2–6
Win	8–7	Jun 2023	ITF Tianjin, China	W15	Clay	(China) Zheng Wushuang	(China) Han Jiangxue (China) Huang Yujia	6–0, 6–2
Win	9–7	Jun 2023	ITF Tianjin, China	W15	Hard	(China) Zheng Wushuang	(China) Han Jiangxue (China) Huang Yujia	6–2, 6–3
Win	10–7	Jul 2023	ITF Naiman, China	W25	Hard	(China) Wu Meixu	(China) Dang Yiming (China) You Xiaodi	1–6, 6–3, [10–5]
Win	11–7	Aug 2023	ITF Nanchang, China	W40	Clay	(China) Zheng Wushuang	(Chinese Taipei) Cho I-hsuan (Chinese Taipei) Cho Yi-tsen	5–7, 7–6^{(8)}, [10–4]
Loss	11–8	Oct 2023	ITF Shenzhen, China	W40	Hard	(China) Zheng Wushuang	(Chinese Taipei) Cho I-hsuan (Chinese Taipei) Cho Yi-tsen	5–7, 3–6
Loss	11–9	Oct 2023	ITF Qiandaohu, China	W25	Hard	(China) Zheng Wushuang	Anastasiia Gureva (Georgia (country)) Sofia Shapatava	2–6, 6–4, [4–10]
Loss	11–10	Feb 2024	ITF Nakhon Si Thammarat, Thailand	W35	Hard	(China) Zheng Wushuang	(Thailand) Peangtarn Plipuech (Japan) Naho Sato	1–6, 6–4, [7–10]
Loss	11–11	Mar 2024	ITF Solarino, Italy	W35	Carpet	(Netherlands) Stéphanie Visscher	(Poland) Weronika Falkowska (Poland) Martyna Kubka	7–5, 1–6, [9–11]
Loss	11–12	Mar 2024	ITF Shenzhen, China	W50	Hard	(China) Wang Jiaqi	(Chinese Taipei) Cho I-hsuan (Chinese Taipei) Cho Yi-tsen	3–6, 4–6
Loss	11–13	May 2024	Kunming Open, China	W50	Clay	(South Korea) Park So-hyun	(United States) Haley Giavara (Chinese Taipei) Li Yu-yun	3–6, 1–6
Loss	11–14	Jun 2024	Macha Lake Open, Czech Republic	W75	Clay	(Greece) Sapfo Sakellaridi	(Poland) Maja Chwalińska (Czech Republic) Anastasia Dețiuc	3–6, 6–2, [6–10]
Loss	11–15	Aug 2024	Jinan Open, China	W50	Hard	(China) Liu Fangzhou	(China) Guo Meiqi (China) Xiao Zhenghua	3–6, 6–1, [5–10]
Loss	11–16	Sep 2024	Incheon Open, South Korea	W100	Hard	(Japan) Aoi Ito	(China) Tang Qianhui (China) Zheng Wushuang	2–6, 3–6
Win	12–16	Sep 2024	ITF Guiyang, China	W50	Hard	(China) Ye Qiuyu	(China) Li Zongyu (China) Shi Han	7–6^{(3)}, 6–3
Win	13–16	May 2025	ITF Goyang, South Korea	W35	Hard	(China) Li Zongyu	(Japan) Hiromi Abe (Japan) Ikumi Yamazaki	6–2, 7–5
Win	14–16	Jun 2025	Zagreb Ladies Open, Croatia	W75	Clay	(Japan) Aoi Ito	Arina Bulatova (Greece) Martha Matoula	7–5, 6–3
Win	15–16	Jun 2025	ITF Palma del Río, Spain	W50	Hard	(Chinese Taipei) Liang En-shuo	(Colombia) María Paulina Pérez (Mexico) Victoria Rodríguez	6–2, 6–3
Loss	15–17	Jul 2025	Ladies Open Hechingen, Germany	W75	Clay	(China) Li Zongyu	(Slovakia) Renáta Jamrichová; Elena Pridankina	2–6, 2–6
Win	16–17	Aug 2025	Ladies Open Amstetten, Austria	W75	Clay	(Chinese Taipei) Liang En-shuo	(Slovenia) Dalila Jakupović (Slovenia) Nika Radišić	4–6, 6–4, [10–0]
Loss	16–18	Aug 2026	Serbian Tennis Tour, Serbia	W75	Clay	(China) Li Zongyu	(Bulgaria) Rositsa Dencheva; Varvara Panshina	4–6, 5–7
Win	17–18	Aug 2026	ITF Bytom, Poland	W75	Clay	(China) Li Zongyu	(Romania) Oana Gavrilă (Greece) Sapfo Sakellaridi	6–4, 6–2
Loss	17–19	Oct 2026	ITF Cherbourg-en-Cotentin, France	W50	Hard (i)	(China) Li Zongyu	(Germany) Nastasja Schunk (Germany) Valentina Steiner	6–7^{(2)}, 4–6
Loss	17–20	Oct 2026	Internationaux de Poitiers, France	W75	Hard (i)	(France) Estelle Cascino	(Portugal) Francisca Jorge (Portugal) Matilde Jorge	2–6, 6–7^{(6)}
