= Ladies Open Amstetten =

- 2026 Ladies Open Amstetten

ITF Women's Tour
- Event name: Ladies Open Amstetten
- Location: Amstetten, Austria
- Venue: UTC Amstetten
- Category: ITF Women's World Tennis Tour
- Surface: Clay
- Draw: 32S/32Q/16D
- Prize money: $60,000
- Website: Official website

The Ladies Open Amstetten is a tournament for professional female tennis players played on outdoor clay courts. The event is classified as a $60,000 ITF Women's World Tennis Tour tournament and has been held in Amstetten, Austria, since 2024.

== Past finals ==
=== Singles ===
Year	Champion	Runner-up	Score
2026	(Serbia) Teodora Kostović	(United States) Vivian Wolff	6–4, 6–0
2025	(Austria) Sinja Kraus	(Austria) Lilli Tagger	6–2, 6–4
2024	Elena Pridankina	(Ukraine) Valeriya Strakhova	6–0, 6–4

=== Doubles ===
Year	Champions	Runners-up	Score
2026	(Czech Republic) Aneta Kučmová (Czech Republic) Aneta Laboutková	(Spain) Ángela Fita Boluda (Czech Republic) Anna Sisková	6–1, 1–6, [16–14]
2025	(China) Feng Shuo (Chinese Taipei) Liang En-shuo	(Slovenia) Dalila Jakupović (Slovenia) Nika Radišić	4–6, 6–4, [10–0]
2024	(Spain) Yvonne Cavallé Reimers (Netherlands) Eva Vedder	(Czech Republic) Jesika Malečková (Czech Republic) Miriam Škoch	6–3, 6–2
