= Teodora Kostović =

Serbian tennis player (born 2007)

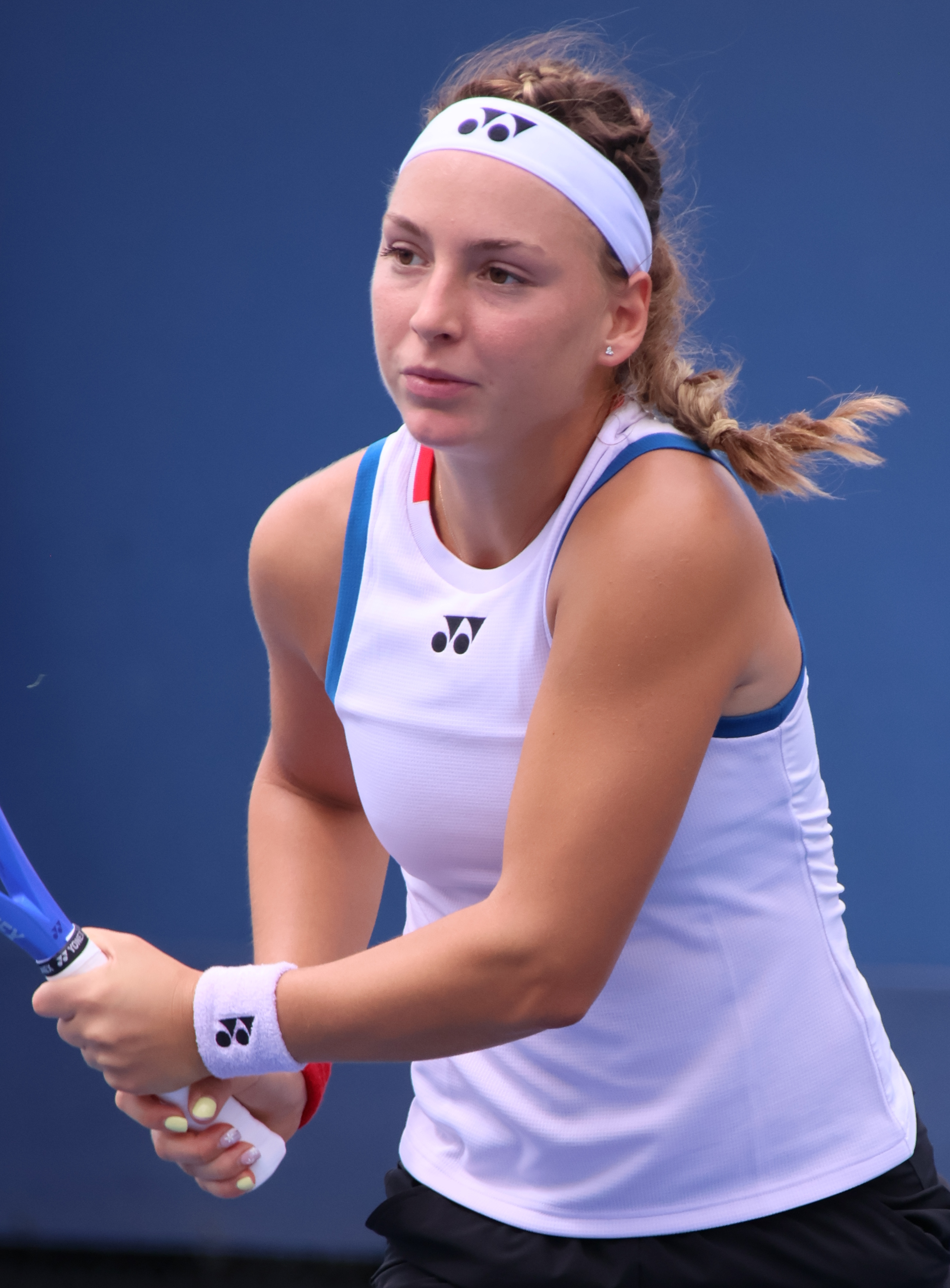
- Kostović at the 2026 US Open
- Country (sports): Serbia
- Residence: Novi Sad, Serbia
- Born: 28 June 2007 (age 19) Novi Sad, Serbia
- Height: 1.76 m (5 ft 9 in)
- Plays: Right-handed (double-handed backhand)
- Coach: Aleksandar Vlaović
- Prize money: US$81,396

Singles
- Career record: 41–15
- Career titles: 1 ITF
- Highest ranking: No. 146 (27 July 2026)
- Current ranking: No. 186 (14 September 2026)

Grand Slam singles results
- Australian Open: Q2 (2026)
- French Open: Q2 (2026)
- Wimbledon: 1R (2026)
- US Open: Q1 (2026)

Doubles
- Career record: 3–3
- Career titles: 0
- Highest ranking: No. 1260 (26 May 2025)
- Current ranking: No. 1366 (18 August 2025)

Team competitions
- Fed Cup: 1–2 (singles 1–1)
- Last updated on: 16 September 2026.

Teodora Kostović (Serbian Cyrillic: Теодора Костовић; born 28 June 2007) is a Serbian professional tennis player. She reached her best WTA singles ranking of world No. 146 on 27 July 2026.

== Early life and background ==
Kostović comes from a sports-focused family and has a brother named Miloš. She began playing tennis at age five and reportedly expressed an early ambition to become the world No. 1 ranked player.

== Career ==
=== Junior events ===
Competing on the ITF Junior Circuit, Kostović achieved a career-high ranking of world No. 6.

She won J300 singles titles on clay courts in Plovdiv and Vrsar in 2023.

In 2024, she claimed five J300 titles across all three major surfaces. Her victories included wins on grass in Roehampton, on hard courts in College Park, and on clay in Bradenton, Oberpullendorf, and Bytom. That same year, she was also a finalist at the J500 event on clay in Offenbach, and the J300 event on hard courts in Indian Wells.

In September 2024, she won the U18 European Junior Championships, defeating Alena Kovačková in the final.

Junior Grand Slam performance

Singles:

- Australian Open: 2R (2024, 2025)
- French Open: 3R (2023, 2024)
- Wimbledon: QF (2024, 2025)
- US Open: QF (2024)

Doubles:

- Australian Open: QF (2024)
- French Open: 2R (2024, 2025)
- Wimbledon: 2R (2025)
- US Open: QF (2024)

=== 2024: Senior debut ===
Aged 16, Kostović made her professional debut on the ITF Women's World Tennis Tour in Kuršumlijska Banja, Serbia. In May 2024, she reached the singles semifinals of a W15 event there, losing in three sets to compatriot Anja Stanković. Later in 2024, she played four additional tournaments in the same town at the W15 and W75 levels, not advancing past the quarterfinals in any of them.

=== 2025: WTA debut ===
Kostović made her WTA Tour singles debut in February at the WTA 500 Abu Dhabi Open, entering the qualifying draw via a wildcard earned through a junior tournament result. In the first qualifying round, she won the first set 6–2 against Diane Parry before the French player retired from the match. In the final qualifying round, Kostović initially led 4–1 against McCartney Kessler but ultimately lost 4–6, 2–6. The following month, she received a wildcard into the qualifying rounds of the WTA 1000 Miami Open. Ranked No. 756 at the time, Kostović defeated world No. 99 and 17th qualifying seed Olivia Gadecki in the first round. She lost to Greet Minnen in the final qualifying round.

In April, Kostović received a wildcard for the qualifying rounds and subsequently qualified for the main draw of the WTA 1000 in Madrid. She achieved this by defeating top-100 player Elena-Gabriela Ruse in the first qualifying round and then Lucrezia Stefanini in the final qualifying round. Entering the main draw of Madrid, Kostović, ranked No. 625, was the lowest-ranked participant aside from those using a protected ranking. She was also the youngest player in the main draw. In the first round, she lost to Eva Lys in straight sets.

=== 2026: Major debut, First WTA quarterfinal ===
At the 2026 SP Open Kostović reached her first WTA Tour quarterfinal defeating ninth seed Darja Semeņistaja.

== Billie Jean King Cup ==
Kostović received her first nomination to represent Serbia in the Billie Jean King Cup in April 2025, under the captaincy of Dušan Vemić, for the 2025 Billie Jean King Cup Europe/Africa Zone Group I event against Slovenia and Lithuania, and later in the promotional play-off tie against Croatia. She made her debut for the national team on 10 April 2025, recording a victory over Klaudija Bubelytė of Lithuania.

== Performance timelines ==
Key
W	F	SF	QF	#R	RR	Q#	P#	DNQ	A	Z#	PO	G	S	B	NMS	NTI	P	NH

(W) winner; (F) finalist; (SF) semifinalist; (QF) quarterfinalist; (#R) rounds 4, 3, 2, 1; (RR) round-robin stage; (Q#) qualification round; (P#) preliminary round; (DNQ) did not qualify; (A) absent; (Z#) Davis/Fed Cup Zonal Group (with number indication) or (PO) play-off; (G) gold, (S) silver or (B) bronze Olympic/Paralympic medal; (NMS) not a Masters tournament; (NTI) not a Tier I tournament; (P) postponed; (NH) not held; (SR) strike rate (events won / competed); (W–L) win–loss record.
To avoid confusion and double counting, these charts are updated at the conclusion of a tournament or when the player's participation has ended.

Only main-draw results in WTA Tour, Grand Slam tournaments, Billie Jean King Cup, United Cup, Hopman Cup and Olympic Games are included in win–loss records.

=== Singles ===
Current through the 2025 Miami Open.

Tournament	2025	2026	SR	W–L	Win%
Grand Slam tournaments
Australian Open	A	Q2	0 / 0	0–0	–
French Open	A	Q2	0 / 0	0–0	–
Wimbledon	A	1R	0 / 1	0–1	0%
US Open	A	Q1	0 / 0	0–0	–
Win–loss	0–0	0–1	0 / 1	0–1	0%
WTA 1000 tournaments
Miami Open	Q2		0 / 0	0–0	–
Madrid Open	1R		0 / 1	0–1	0%
Win–loss	0–1		0 / 1	0–1	0%

== WTA 125 finals ==
=== Singles: 1 (runner-up) ===
Result	W–L	Date	Tournament	Surface	Opponent	Score
Loss	0–1	Sep 2026	Ankara Open, Turkey	Hard	(Turkey) Berfu Cengiz	6–2, 4–6, 5–7

== ITF Circuit finals ==
=== Singles: 3 (2 titles, 1 runner-up) ===
Legend W100 tournaments (1–0) W75 tournaments (1–1)	Finals by surface Clay (2–1)

Result	W–L	Date	Tournament	Tier	Surface	Opponent	Score
Loss	0–1	May 2025	ITF Kuršumlijska Banja, Serbia	W75	Clay	Alina Charaeva	4–6, 6–7^{(5)}
Win	1–1	Aug 2025	Serbian Tennis Tour, Serbia	W75	Clay	(North Macedonia) Lina Gjorcheska	7–5, 6–3
Win	2–1	Jul 2026	Ladies Open Amstetten, Austria	W100	Clay	(United States) Vivian Wolff	6–4, 6–0
