= Berfu Cengiz =

Turkish tennis player (born 1999)

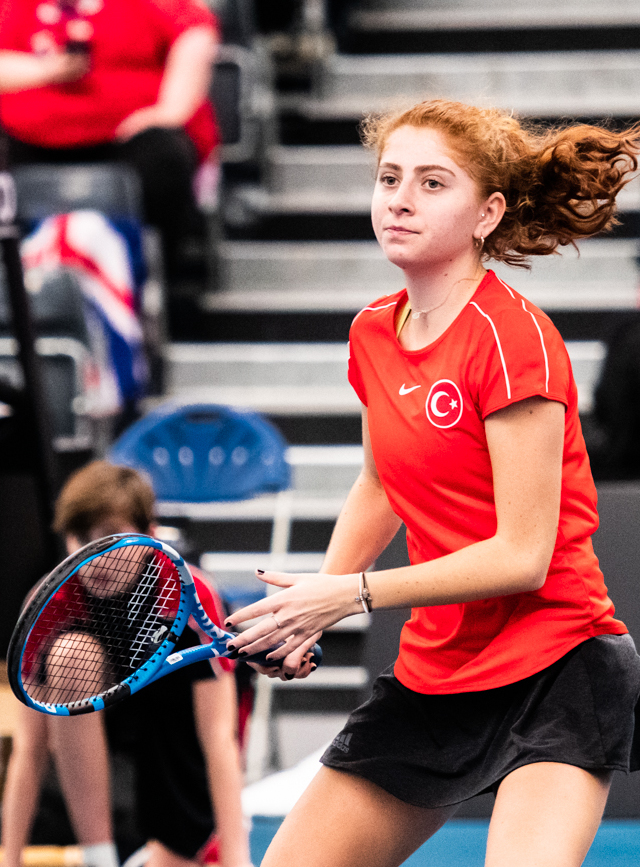
- Cengiz at the 2019 Fed Cup
- Country (sports): Turkey
- Born: 18 October 1999 (age 26) Adana, Turkey
- Plays: Right (two-handed backhand)
- Prize money: US$ 301,223

Singles
- Career record: 295–210
- Career titles: 1 WTA 125, 8 ITF
- Highest ranking: No. 190 (23 December 2024)
- Current ranking: No. 225 (28 September 2026)

Grand Slam singles results
- Wimbledon: Q1 (2025)
- US Open: Q1 (2025)

Doubles
- Career record: 146–103
- Career titles: 8 ITF
- Highest ranking: No. 214 (15 July 2019)
- Current ranking: No. 459 (28 September 2026)
- Last updated on: 28 September 2026.

Berfu Cengiz
Medal record

Women's tennis

Representing Turkey

Mediterranean Games
| Bronze medal – third place | 2026 Taranto | Doubles |

Berfu Cengiz (born 18 October 1999) is a Turkish tennis player. She has a career-high WTA rankings of world No. 195 in singles, achieved on 9 December 2024, and No. 214 in doubles, set on 15 July 2019.

Cengiz has won one WTA 125 singles title as well as eight singles and eight doubles titles on the ITF circuit. She is the current No. 3 Turkish player.

== Career ==
Cengiz won her first big ITF title ($80k) at the 2018 President's Cup in Astana.

She made her WTA Tour main draw debut as a wildcard entrant at the 2020 İstanbul Cup, losing in the first round to third seed Polona Hercog.

Cengiz defeated eighth seed Noma Noha Akugue to reach the second round at the 2023 WTA 125 Open delle Puglie, where she lost to wildcard entrant Jennifer Ruggeri.

Using protected ranking at the 2025 SP Open, Cengiz recorded her first WTA main draw win on her fourth attempt, defeating Jazmín Ortenzi. She lost to fifth seed Renata Zarazúa in the second round.

Cengiz won her maiden WTA 125 title at the 2026 Ankara Open, defeating fifth seed Teodora Kostović in the final. As a result she moved back into the top 225 in the WTA singles rankings on 28 September 2026.

== WTA 125 finals ==
=== Singles: 1 (title) ===
| Result | W–L | Date | Tournament | Surface | Opponent | Score |
|---|---|---|---|---|---|---|
| Win | 1–0 | Sep 2026 | Ankara Open, Turkey | Hard | (Serbia) Teodora Kostović | 2–6, 6–4, 7–5 |

=== Doubles: 1 (0 title, 1 runner-ups) ===
| Result | W–L | Date | Tournament | Surface | Partner | Opponents | Score |
|---|---|---|---|---|---|---|---|
| Loss | 0–1 | Jul 2025 | Swedish Open, Sweden | Clay | (Spain) Irene Burillo Escorihuela | (Czech Republic) Jesika Malečková (Czech Republic) Miriam Škoch | 4–6, 3–6 |

== ITF Circuit finals ==
=== Singles: 15 (8 titles, 7 runner-ups) ===
| Legend W100 tournaments (0–1) W60/75 tournaments (0–1) W40/50 tournaments (3–0) W25/35 tournaments (1–2) W10/15 tournaments (4–3) | Finals by surface Hard (3–1) Clay (5–6) |

| Result | W–L | Date | Tournament | Clay | Surface | Opponent | Score |
|---|---|---|---|---|---|---|---|
| Loss | 0–1 | Mar 2015 | ITF Antalya, Turkey | W10 | Clay | (Romania) Diana Enache | 6–4, 4–6, 0–6 |
| Win | 1–1 | Aug 2016 | ITF Sharm El Sheikh, Egypt | W10 | Hard | (Sweden) Anette Munozova | 6–2, 6–4 |
| Win | 2–1 | Jun 2017 | ITF Banja Luka, BiH | W15 | Clay | (Slovenia) Nina Potočnik | 6–4, 3–6, 6–3 |
| Loss | 2–2 | Oct 2017 | ITF Jounieh Open, Lebanon | W15 | Clay | (France) Clothilde de Bernardi | 0–6, 4–6 |
| Win | 3–2 | Mar 2018 | Sharm El Sheikh, Egypt | W15 | Hard | (Belarus) Yuliya Hatouka | 6–3, 4–6, 6–3 |
| Loss | 3–3 | Feb 2020 | Jodhpur, India | W25 | Hard | (India) Ankita Raina | 5–7, 1–6 |
| Loss | 3–4 | Dec 2020 | Antalya, Turkey | W15 | Clay | (France) Diane Parry | 3–6, 1–6 |
| Win | 4–4 | Jan 2021 | Antalya, Turkey | W15 | Clay | (Turkey) İpek Öz | 3–6, 6–2, 6–4 |
| Win | 5–4 | Feb 2023 | Mexico City, Mexico | W40 | Hard | (China) Yuan Yue | 6–4, 1–6, 7–6^{(9)} |
| Loss | 5–5 | Apr 2023 | Istanbul, Turkey | W60 | Clay | (Romania) Irina Bara | 7–6^{(2)}, 4–6, 1–6 |
| Win | 6–5 | May 2024 | Båstad, Sweden | W35 | Clay | (Bulgaria) Gergana Topalova | 6–4, 6–2 |
| Win | 7–5 | Jun 2024 | Troisdorf, Germany | W50 | Clay | (Switzerland) Susan Bandecchi | 6–1, 2–6, 6–3 |
| Win | 8–5 | Jun 2024 | Ystad, Sweden | W50 | Clay | (Spain) Irene Burillo Escorihuela | 6–3, 3–6, 6–3 |
| Loss | 8–6 | Jul 2024 | Amstelveen Open, Netherlands | W35 | Clay | (Australia) Jaimee Fourlis | 6–7, 6–2, 1–6 |
| Loss | 8–7 | Aug 2026 | ITF Maspalomas, Spain | W100 | Clay | (Brazil) Laura Pigossi | 7–6^{(2)}, 1–6, 3–6 |

=== Doubles: 21 (8 titles, 13 runner-ups) ===
| Legend W80 tournaments (1–0) W60/75 tournaments (0–3) W40/50 tournaments (1–0) W25/35 tournaments (1–7) W10/15 tournaments (5–3) | Finals by surface Hard (3–12) Clay (5–1) |

| Result | W–L | Date | Tournament | Tier | Surface | Partner | Opponents | Score |
|---|---|---|---|---|---|---|---|---|
| Loss | 0–1 | Aug 2016 | ITF Sharm El Sheikh, Egypt | W10 | Hard | (India) Dhruthi Tatachar Venugopal | (Greece) Despina Papamichail (Montenegro) Ana Veselinović | 6–7^{(4)}, 6–1, [5–10] |
| Win | 1–1 | Oct 2016 | ITF Antalya, Turkey | W10 | Clay | (Bulgaria) Ani Vangelova | (Romania) Cristina Adamescu (Belarus) Sadafmoh Tolibova | 6–3, 6–4 |
| Loss | 1–2 | Nov 2016 | ITF Antalya, Turkey | W10 | Hard | (Turkey) Melis Sezer | (Ukraine) Diana Khodan (Ukraine) Mariya Koryttseva | 1–6, 4–6 |
| Win | 2–2 | Nov 2016 | ITF Antalya, Turkey | W10 | Clay | (Serbia) Olga Danilović | (Germany) Tayisiya Morderger (Germany) Yana Morderger | 6–4, 6–4 |
| Win | 3–2 | Jun 2017 | ITF Banja Luka, BiH | W15 | Clay | (Bulgaria) Ani Vangelova | (India) Riya Bhatia (Serbia) Tamara Čurović | 7–5, 7–6^{(4)} |
| Win | 4–2 | Aug 2017 | ITF Istanbul, Turkey | W15 | Clay | (Turkey) İpek Öz | (Russia) Vasilisa Aponasenko (Croatia) Tea Faber | 6–4, 6–1 |
| Win | 5–2 | Sep 2017 | ITF Jounieh Open, Lebanon | W15 | Clay | (Egypt) Ola Abou Zekry | (Sweden) Jacqueline Cabaj Awad (Sweden) Fanny Östlund | 6–4, 7–5 |
| Loss | 5–3 | Oct 2017 | ITF Óbidos, Portugal | W25 | Hard | (United Kingdom) Katie Swan | (Russia) Olga Doroshina (Russia) Yana Sizikova | 2–6, 2–6 |
| Loss | 5–4 | Jan 2018 | ITF Sharm El Sheikh | W15 | Hard | (Bosnia and Herzegovina) Jasmina Tinjić | (New Zealand) Jade Lewis (New Zealand) Erin Routliffe | 1–6, 7–5, [10–12] |
| Loss | 5–5 | Jun 2018 | ITF Óbidos, Portugal | W25 | Hard | (Australia) Sara Tomic | (Sweden) Linnéa Malmqvist (Italy) Angelica Moratelli | 5–7, 1–2 ret. |
| Win | 6–5 | Jul 2018 | President's Cup, Kazakhstan | W80 | Hard | (Kazakhstan) Anna Danilina | (Uzbekistan) Akgul Amanmuradova (Georgia (country)) Ekaterine Gorgodze | 3–6, 6–3, [10–7] |
| Loss | 6–6 | Dec 2018 | ITF Navi Mumbai, India | W25 | Hard | (Indonesia) Jessy Rompies | (Uzbekistan) Albina Khabibulina (Russia) Ekaterina Yashina | 2–6, 1–6 |
| Win | 7–6 | Jun 2019 | Fergana Challenger, Uzbekistan | W25 | Hard | (Uzbekistan) Nigina Abduraimova | (Australia) Isabella Bozicevic (Russia) Ksenia Laskutova | 4–6, 6–1, [10–3] |
| Loss | 7–7 | Dec 2019 | ITF Solapur, India | W25 | Hard | (Greece) Despina Papamichail | (Norway) Ulrikke Eikeri (India) Ankita Raina | 7–5, 4–6, [3–10] |
| Loss | 7–8 | Mar 2020 | ITF Potchefstroom, South Africa | W25 | Hard | (New Zealand) Paige Hourigan | (United Kingdom) Samantha Murray Sharan (Hungary) Fanny Stollár | 1–6, 1–6 |
| Loss | 7–9 | Apr 2021 | Dubai Tennis Challenge, UAE | W25 | Hard | (Turkey) İpek Öz | (United States) Emina Bektas (United Kingdom) Tara Moore | 5–7, 6–4, [7–10] |
| Loss | 7–10 | Jun 2021 | ITF Figueira da Foz, Portugal | W25 | Hard | (Russia) Anastasia Tikhonova | (United Kingdom) Alicia Barnett (United Kingdom) Olivia Nicholls | 3–6, 6–7^{(3)} |
| Loss | 7–11 | Apr 2022 | ITF Istanbul, Turkey | W60 | Clay | (Russia) Anastasia Tikhonova | (Poland) Maja Chwalińska (Czech Republic) Jesika Malečková | 6–2, 4–6, [7–10] |
| Win | 8–11 | Feb 2023 | ITF Mexico City, Mexico | W40 | Hard | (United States) Sofia Sewing | (Netherlands) Suzan Lamens (Latvia) Darja Semeņistaja | 6–1, 1–6, [12–10] |
| Loss | 8–12 | Apr 2023 | Open de Seine-et-Marne, France | W60 | Hard | (United Kingdom) Jodie Burrage | (Belgium) Greet Minnen (Belgium) Yanina Wickmayer | 4–6, 4–6 |
| Loss | 8–13 | June 2023 | Madrid Open, Spain | W60 | Hard | (Australia) Destanee Aiava | (United States) Makenna Jones (United States) Jamie Loeb | 4–6, 7–5, [6–10] |

== Junior finals ==
=== ITF Junior Circuit ===
Legend
Category G1
Category G2
Category G3
Category G4
Category G5

=== Singles (5–3) ===
| Result | W–L | Date | Tournament | Surface | Opponent | Score |
|---|---|---|---|---|---|---|
| Loss | 0–1 | Mar 2013 | ITF Doha, Qatar | Clay | (Cyprus) Maria Siopacha | 6–2, 1–6, 2–6 |
| Loss | 0–2 | Mar 2013 | ITF Doha, Qatar | Clay | (Cyprus) Maria Siopacha | 1–6, 4–6 |
| Win | 1–2 | Aug 2013 | ITF Amman, Jordan | Hard | (Egypt) Nermeen Shawky | 6–4, 6–2 |
| Win | 2–2 | Nov 2013 | ITF Hawali, Kuwait | Hard | (Egypt) Laila Elnimr | 6–4, 7–6^{(8)} |
| Loss | 2–3 | May 2014 | ITF Istanbul, Turkey | Hard | (Turkey) Ayla Aksu | 5–7, 3–6 |
| Win | 3–3 | Jun 2014 | ITF Tunis, Tunisia | Hard | (Tunisia) Chiraz Bechri | 6–0, 6–2 |
| Win | 4–3 | May 2015 | ITF Istanbul, Turkey | Hard | (Belarus) Katsiaryna Yemelyanenka | 6–2, 6–1 |
| Win | 5–3 | Sep 2015 | ITF Cairo, Egypt | Clay | (Chinese Taipei) Wei Tang | 4–6, 6–4, 6–4 |

=== Doubles (3–6) ===
| Result | W–L | Date | Tournament | Surface | Partner | Opponents | Score |
|---|---|---|---|---|---|---|---|
| Win | 1–0 | Nov 2012 | ITF Hawali, Kuwait | Clay | (Australia) Skye Hopper | (Egypt) Marina Albert (Lebanon) Nancy Karaky | 5–7, 6–7^{(4)} |
| Loss | 1–1 | Jul 2013 | ITF Cairo, Egypt | Clay | (Turkey) Müge Topsel | (Egypt) Lamis Alhussein Abdel Aziz (Egypt) Rana Essam | w/o |
| Win | 2–1 | Aug 2013 | ITF Amman, Jordan | Hard | (Turkey) Defne Olcay | (Turkey) Ceylin Günay (Turkey) Müge Topsel | 6–3, 6–1 |
| Win | 3–1 | Sep 2013 | ITF Ashgabat, Turkmenistan | Hard | (Turkmenistan) Jahana Bayramova | (Russia) Anastasia Gasanova (Russia) Melissa Ifidzhen | 6–2, 6–2 |
| Loss | 3–2 | Jun 2014 | ITF Carthage, Tunisia | Hard | (Egypt) Habiba Lasheen | (Slovakia) Timea Pavlíková (Slovakia) Tamara Kupková | 4–6, 3–6 |
| Loss | 3–3 | Jun 2014 | ITF Tunis, Tunisia | Hard | (Egypt) Habiba Lasheen | (Tunisia) Chiraz Bechri (United Kingdom) Katarina Weymouth | 6–1, 4–6, [7–10] |
| Loss | 3–4 | Jan 2015 | ITF Tunis, Tunisia | Hard | (Namibia) Lesedi Sheya Jacobs | (Russia) Tatiana Makarova (Hungary) Panna Udvardy | 6–1, 5–7, [6–10] |
| Loss | 3–5 | Feb 2015 | ITF Hammamet, Tunisia | Clay | (Namibia) Lesedi Sheya Jacobs | (Netherlands) Nina Kruijer (Netherlands) Liza Lebedzeva | 6–4, 3–6, [6–10] |
| Loss | 3–6 | Sep 2015 | ITF Cairo, Egypt | Clay | (Turkey) Selin Övünç | (Russia) Aleksandra Kuznetsova (Russia) Maria Solnyshkina | 4–6, 4–6 |
