= 2025 Austin Challenger =

- Date: 3–9 November 2025
- Edition: 1st
- Category: WTA 125
- Prize money: $115,000
- Surface: Hard
- Location: Austin, United States

Champions

Singles
- (Mexico) Renata Zarazúa

Doubles
- Maria Kozyreva / Iryna Shymanovich
Austin Challenger	· 2026 →

The 2025 Austin 125 was a professional women's tennis tournament played on outdoor hardcourts. It was the first edition of the tournament and part of the 2025 WTA 125 tournaments. It took place at the Austin Tennis Academy in Austin, United States between 3 and 9 November 2025.

== Singles main-draw entrants ==
=== Seeds ===
Country	Player	Rank^{1}	Seed
USA	Iva Jovic	36	1
USA	Alycia Parks	65	2
MEX	Renata Zarazúa	81	3
USA	Caroline Dolehide	112	4
CRO	Petra Marčinko	116	5
NED	Arantxa Rus	136	6
USA	Whitney Osuigwe	141	7
CZE	Darja Vidmanová	142	8

- ^{1} Rankings are as of 27 October 2025.

=== Other entrants ===
The following players received wildcards into the singles main draw:

- (Romania) Carmen Andreea Herea
- (United States) Jennifer Jackson
- (United States) Iva Jovic
- (United States) Malaika Rapolu

The following players received entry from the qualifying draw:

- (United States) Mary Lewis
- (United States) Claire Liu
- (United States) Christasha McNeil
- (United States) Vivian Wolff

=== Withdrawals ===
Before the tournament

- (United Kingdom) Katie Boulter → replaced by (Japan) Himeno Sakatsume
- (Canada) Carson Branstine → replaced by (Japan) Mai Hontama
- (United States) Kayla Day → replaced by (United States) Alana Smith
- (United States) Caty McNally → replaced by (United States) Anna Rogers
- (Latvia) Darja Semeņistaja → replaced by (United States) Mary Stoiana
- (United States) Peyton Stearns → replaced by (United States) Hina Inoue
- (Australia) Ajla Tomljanović → replaced by Anastasia Gasanova
- (Belgium) Hanne Vandewinkel → replaced by (France) Julie Belgraver

== Doubles entrants ==
=== Seeds ===
Country	Player	Country	Player	Rank	Seed
	Maria Kozyreva		Iryna Shymanovich	154	1
GBR	Emily Appleton	CAN	Kayla Cross	223	2

- Rankings as of 27 October 2025.

=== Other entrants ===
The following pair received a wildcard into the doubles main draw:

- (United States) Jennifer Jackson / (United States) Mary Lewis

== Champions ==
=== Singles ===
- (Mexico) Renata Zarazúa def. (Canada) Marina Stakusic 6–4, 3–6, 6–3

=== Doubles ===
- Maria Kozyreva / Iryna Shymanovich def. (United States) Carmen Corley / (United States) Ivana Corley 6–3, 7–6^{(7–4)}
