= 2026 French Open – Women's doubles =

Tennis championship

Women's doubles
- 2026 French Open

Final
- Champions: (Czech Republic) Kateřina Siniaková (United States) Taylor Townsend
- Runners-up: (Kazakhstan) Anna Danilina (Serbia) Aleksandra Krunić
- Score: 6–2, 7–5
- Date: 7 June 2026

Details
- Draw: 64
- Seeds: 16

Events
Singles	men	women		boys	girls
Doubles	men	women	mixed	boys	girls
WC Singles	men	women	quad	boys	girls
WC Doubles	men	women	quad	boys	girls
- French Open

Kateřina Siniaková and Taylor Townsend defeated Anna Danilina and Aleksandra Krunić in the final, 6–2, 7–5 to win the women's doubles tennis title at the 2026 French Open. It was the eleventh major title for Siniaková and third for Townsend.

Sara Errani and Jasmine Paolini were the reigning champions, but Paolini withdrew due to a foot injury. Errani partnered Lilli Tagger, but they lost in the second round to Ellen Perez and Demi Schuurs.

Siniaková retained the WTA No. 1 doubles ranking by reaching the semifinals. Gabriela Dabrowski and Elise Mertens were also in contention for the top ranking at the beginning of the tournament.

Mertens was trying to complete the career Grand Slam. She partnered Zhang Shuai, but they lost in the third round to Guo Hanyu and Kristina Mladenovic.

== Seeds ==
1. (Czech Republic) Kateřina Siniaková / (United States) Taylor Townsend (champions)
2. (Kazakhstan) Anna Danilina / (Serbia) Aleksandra Krunić (final)
3. (Belgium) Elise Mertens / (China) Zhang Shuai (third round)
4. (Canada) Gabriela Dabrowski / (Brazil) Luisa Stefani (semifinals)
5. (Latvia) Jeļena Ostapenko / (New Zealand) Erin Routliffe (second round)
6. (Spain) Cristina Bucșa / (United States) Nicole Melichar-Martinez (third round, withdrew)
7. (Australia) Ellen Perez / (Netherlands) Demi Schuurs (quarterfinals)
8. (United States) Asia Muhammad / (Hungary) Fanny Stollár (first round)
9. (Ukraine) Lyudmyla Kichenok / (United States) Desirae Krawczyk (first round)
10. (Slovakia) Tereza Mihalíková / (United Kingdom) Olivia Nicholls (third round)
11. (Germany) Laura Siegemund / Vera Zvonareva (quarterfinals)
12. (Australia) Storm Hunter / (United States) Caty McNally (second round)
13. (China) Guo Hanyu / (France) Kristina Mladenovic (quarterfinals)
14. (China) Jiang Xinyu / (China) Xu Yifan (first round)
15. (Norway) Ulrikke Eikeri / (United States) Quinn Gleason (third round)
16. (Japan) Eri Hozumi / (Chinese Taipei) Wu Fang-hsien (second round)

Click on the seed number of a player to go to their draw section.

== Draw ==
Key

- Q = Qualifier
- WC = Wild card
- LL = Lucky loser
- Alt = Alternate
- ITF = ITF entry
- PR = Protected ranking
- SR = Special ranking
- SE = Special exempt
- JE = Junior exempt
- JR = Junior Accelerator Programme entrant
- CO = College Accelerator Programme entrant
- NG = Next Gen Accelerator Program entrant
- w/o = Walkover
- r = Retired
- d = Defaulted

=== Finals ===
Quarterfinals
1	(Czech Republic) Kateřina Siniaková (United States) Taylor Townsend	6	6
PR	(Belgium) Magali Kempen (Slovenia) Andreja Klepač	1	3
4	(Canada) Gabriela Dabrowski (Brazil) Luisa Stefani	6	7
11	(Germany) Laura Siegemund; Vera Zvonareva	4	5
(Japan) Shuko Aoyama (Chinese Taipei) Liang En-shuo	6	6
13	(China) Guo Hanyu (France) Kristina Mladenovic	4	4
7	(Australia) Ellen Perez (Netherlands) Demi Schuurs	2	6^{6}
2	(Kazakhstan) Anna Danilina (Serbia) Aleksandra Krunić	6	7^{8}

Semifinals
1	(Czech Republic) Kateřina Siniaková (United States) Taylor Townsend	6	6
4	(Canada) Gabriela Dabrowski (Brazil) Luisa Stefani	0	1
(Japan) Shuko Aoyama (Chinese Taipei) Liang En-shuo	5	2
2	(Kazakhstan) Anna Danilina (Serbia) Aleksandra Krunić	7	6

Final
1	(Czech Republic) Kateřina Siniaková (United States) Taylor Townsend	6	7
2	(Kazakhstan) Anna Danilina (Serbia) Aleksandra Krunić	2	5

=== Top half ===
==== Section 1 ====
First round
1	(Czech Republic) K Siniaková (United States) T Townsend	6	6
(Croatia) P Marčinko (Croatia) A Ružić	1	0
(Colombia) E Arango (United States) I Jovic	6	6
(Australia) K Birrell (Australia) T Gibson	3	2
(Uzbekistan) K Rakhimova (Czech Republic) A Sisková	6	3	4
(Ukraine) N Kichenok (Japan) M Ninomiya	4	6	6
(Romania) J Cristian (Austria) A Potapova	3	0
16	(Japan) E Hozumi (Chinese Taipei) F-h Wu	6	6
10	(Slovakia) T Mihalíková (United Kingdom) O Nicholls	7^{7}	6
WC	(France) T Lemaître (France) A Ramé	6^{2}	0
(Poland) M Linette (Ukraine) Y Starodubtseva	3	6	6
WC	(France) E Jacquemot (France) T Rakotomanga Rajaonah	6	4	3
(United Kingdom) H Dart; A Panova	4	3
(Brazil) I Martins (Argentina) S Sierra	6	6
PR	(Belgium) M Kempen (Slovenia) A Klepač	3	6	6
8	(United States) A Muhammad (Hungary) F Stollár	6	1	2

Second round
1	(Czech Republic) K Siniaková (United States) T Townsend	6	3	6
(Colombia) E Arango (United States) I Jovic	2	6	2
(Ukraine) N Kichenok (Japan) M Ninomiya	0	7^{8}	6
16	(Japan) E Hozumi (Chinese Taipei) F-h Wu	6	6^{6}	2
10	(Slovakia) T Mihalíková (United Kingdom) O Nicholls	4	6	6
(Poland) M Linette (Ukraine) Y Starodubtseva	6	3	4
(Brazil) I Martins (Argentina) S Sierra	2	2
PR	(Belgium) M Kempen (Slovenia) A Klepač	6	6

Third round
1	(Czech Republic) K Siniaková (United States) T Townsend	6	6
(Ukraine) N Kichenok (Japan) M Ninomiya	4	2
10	(Slovakia) T Mihalíková (United Kingdom) O Nicholls	2	5
PR	(Belgium) M Kempen (Slovenia) A Klepač	6	7

Quarterfinals
1	(Czech Republic) K Siniaková (United States) T Townsend	6	6
PR	(Belgium) M Kempen (Slovenia) A Klepač	1	3

==== Section 2 ====
First round
4	(Canada) G Dabrowski (Brazil) L Stefani	6	6
(Netherlands) I Haverlag (United Kingdom) M Lumsden	2	0
E Pridankina (China) Q Tang	6	4	6
(Czech Republic) L Nosková (Czech Republic) T Valentová	3	6	1
M Kozyreva; I Shymanovich	6	4	2
(Czech Republic) A Dețiuc; I Khromacheva	4	6	6
E Alexandrova (Chinese Taipei) H-c Chan	2	4
15	(Norway) U Eikeri (United States) Q Gleason	6	6
11	(Germany) L Siegemund; V Zvonareva	6	6^{5}	6
(United States) A Li (Denmark) C Tauson	3	7^{7}	3
WC	(France) F Ferro (France) D Parry	6	6
Alt	(United States) C Corley (United States) I Corley	4	2
Alt	(Spain) O Selekhmeteva; A Zakharova	6	6
(Canada) L Fernandez; D Shnaider	3	1
(Poland) K Piter (Mexico) R Zarazúa	7^{7}	5	0
6	(Spain) C Bucșa (United States) N Melichar-Martinez	6^{2}	7	6

Second round
4	(Canada) G Dabrowski (Brazil) L Stefani	6	3	6
E Pridankina (China) Q Tang	3	6	2
(Czech Republic) A Dețiuc; I Khromacheva	7^{7}	4	1
15	(Norway) U Eikeri (United States) Q Gleason	6^{5}	6	6
11	(Germany) L Siegemund; V Zvonareva	w/o
WC	(France) F Ferro (France) D Parry
Alt	(Spain) O Selekhmeteva; A Zakharova	6	3	4
6	(Spain) C Bucșa (United States) N Melichar-Martinez	4	6	6

Third round
4	(Canada) G Dabrowski (Brazil) L Stefani	7	6
15	(Norway) U Eikeri (United States) Q Gleason	5	4
11	(Germany) L Siegemund; V Zvonareva	w/o
6	(Spain) C Bucșa (United States) N Melichar-Martinez

Quarterfinals
4	(Canada) G Dabrowski (Brazil) L Stefani	6	7
11	(Germany) L Siegemund; V Zvonareva	4	5

=== Bottom half ===
==== Section 3 ====
First round
5	(Latvia) J Ostapenko (New Zealand) E Routliffe	3	6	6
WC	(France) K Efremova (France) E Inisan	6	1	2
(Japan) S Aoyama (Chinese Taipei) E-s Liang	6	6
(Spain) J Bouzas Maneiro (Italy) E Cocciaretto	2	3
Alt	(Hong Kong) E Chong (Slovenia) V Erjavec	6	2	7
(Japan) M Kato (Mexico) G Olmos	3	6	5
WC	(France) C Burel (France) C Paquet	4	1
12	(Australia) S Hunter (United States) C McNally	6	6
13	(China) H Guo (France) K Mladenovic	1	6	7
(Germany) E Lys (United States) P Stearns	6	2	5
(Australia) D Kasatkina (Colombia) C Osorio	4	1
(Chinese Taipei) S-w Hsieh (China) Xin Wang	6	6
(Ukraine) O Oliynykova (Hungary) P Udvardy	7	4	1
Alt	(Argentina) N Fossa Huergo (Germany) T Korpatsch	5	6	6
Alt	(United States) A Parks (Brazil) L Pigossi	2	6	6^{6}
3	(Belgium) E Mertens (China) S Zhang	6	4	7^{10}

Second round
5	(Latvia) J Ostapenko (New Zealand) E Routliffe	5	4
(Japan) S Aoyama (Chinese Taipei) E-s Liang	7	6
Alt	(Hong Kong) E Chong (Slovenia) V Erjavec	6	1	6
12	(Australia) S Hunter (United States) C McNally	2	6	3
13	(China) H Guo (France) K Mladenovic	6	6
(Chinese Taipei) S-w Hsieh (China) Xin Wang	1	4
Alt	(Argentina) N Fossa Huergo (Germany) T Korpatsch	1	1
3	(Belgium) E Mertens (China) S Zhang	6	6

Third round
(Japan) S Aoyama (Chinese Taipei) E-s Liang	6	6
Alt	(Hong Kong) E Chong (Slovenia) V Erjavec	1	3
13	(China) H Guo (France) K Mladenovic	6	6
3	(Belgium) E Mertens (China) S Zhang	2	4

Quarterfinals
(Japan) S Aoyama (Chinese Taipei) E-s Liang	6	6
13	(China) H Guo (France) K Mladenovic	4	4

==== Section 4 ====
First round
7	(Australia) E Perez (Netherlands) D Schuurs	6	7^{7}
(United Kingdom) K Boulter (Kazakhstan) Y Putintseva	1	6^{5}
(United States) S Kenin (United States) A Krueger	3	2
(Italy) S Errani (Austria) L Tagger	6	6
(Indonesia) A Sutjiadi (Indonesia) J Tjen	7^{9}	2	4
PR	(Czech Republic) M Bouzková (Spain) S Sorribes Tormo	6^{7}	6	6
(Brazil) B Haddad Maia; L Samsonova	7	2	6
9	(Ukraine) L Kichenok (United States) D Krawczyk	5	6	2
14	(China) X Jiang (China) Y Xu	1	1
(Ukraine) A Kalinina (Ukraine) D Yastremska	6	6
WC	(France) E Cascino (France) C Monnet	2	6^{3}
(Germany) T Maria (Turkey) Z Sönmez	6	7^{7}
(Australia) M Joint (Belgium) H Vandewinkel	6^{6}	6	6
WC	(France) L Jeanjean (France) J Ponchet	7^{8}	1	3
(Czech Republic) J Malečková (Czech Republic) M Škoch	4	1
2	(Kazakhstan) A Danilina (Serbia) A Krunić	6	6

Second round
7	(Australia) E Perez (Netherlands) D Schuurs	7^{7}	7^{10}
(Italy) S Errani (Austria) L Tagger	6^{5}	6^{8}
PR	(Czech Republic) M Bouzková (Spain) S Sorribes Tormo	1	4
(Brazil) B Haddad Maia; L Samsonova	6	6
(Ukraine) A Kalinina (Ukraine) D Yastremska	2
(Germany) T Maria (Turkey) Z Sönmez	0^{r}
(Australia) M Joint (Belgium) H Vandewinkel	2	3
2	(Kazakhstan) A Danilina (Serbia) A Krunić	6	6

Third round
7	(Australia) E Perez (Netherlands) D Schuurs	6	2	6
(Brazil) B Haddad Maia; L Samsonova	3	6	4
(Ukraine) A Kalinina (Ukraine) D Yastremska	4	4
2	(Kazakhstan) A Danilina (Serbia) A Krunić	6	6

Quarterfinals
7	(Australia) E Perez (Netherlands) D Schuurs	2	6^{6}
2	(Kazakhstan) A Danilina (Serbia) A Krunić	6	7^{8}

== Seeded teams ==
The following are the projected seeded players, based on live WTA rankings as of 15 May 2026. Actual seedings will be based on WTA rankings as of 18 May 2026.

Country	Player	Country	Player	Rank	Seed
CZE	Kateřina Siniaková	USA	Taylor Townsend	3	1
KAZ	Anna Danilina	SRB	Aleksandra Krunić	9	2
BEL	Elise Mertens	CHN	Zhang Shuai	13	3
CAN	Gabriela Dabrowski	BRA	Luisa Stefani	15	4
LAT	Jeļena Ostapenko	NZL	Erin Routliffe	25	5
ESP	Cristina Bucșa	USA	Nicole Melichar-Martinez	32	6
AUS	Ellen Perez	NED	Demi Schuurs	47	7
USA	Asia Muhammad	HUN	Fanny Stollár	56	8
UKR	Lyudmyla Kichenok	USA	Desirae Krawczyk	56	9
SVK	Tereza Mihalíková	GBR	Olivia Nicholls	56	10
GER	Laura Siegemund		Vera Zvonareva	57	11
AUS	Storm Hunter	USA	Caty McNally	65	12
CHN	Guo Hanyu	FRA	Kristina Mladenovic	71	13
CHN	Jiang Xinyu	CHN	Xu Yifan	76	14
NOR	Ulrikke Eikeri	USA	Quinn Gleason	80	15
JPN	Eri Hozumi	TPE	Wu Fang-hsien	87	16

== Other entry information ==
=== Wildcards ===
- (France) Clara Burel / (France) Chloé Paquet
- (France) Estelle Cascino / (France) Carole Monnet
- (France) Ksenia Efremova / (France) Eleejah Inisan
- (France) Fiona Ferro / (France) Diane Parry
- (France) Elsa Jacquemot / (France) Tiantsoa Rakotomanga Rajaonah
- (France) Léolia Jeanjean / (France) Jessika Ponchet
- (France) Tiphanie Lemaître / (France) Alice Ramé

=== Protected ranking ===
- (Czech Republic) Marie Bouzková / (Spain) Sara Sorribes Tormo
- (Belgium) Magali Kempen / (Slovenia) Andreja Klepač

=== Alternates ===
- (Hong Kong) Eudice Chong / (Slovenia) Veronika Erjavec
- (United States) Carmen Corley / (United States) Ivana Corley
- (Argentina) Nicole Fossa Huergo / (Germany) Tamara Korpatsch
- (United States) Alycia Parks / (Brazil) Laura Pigossi
- (Spain) Oksana Selekhmeteva / Anastasia Zakharova

=== Withdrawals ===
- § (United States) Hailey Baptiste / (United States) Venus Williams → replaced by (Hong Kong) Eudice Chong / (Slovenia) Veronika Erjavec
- § (Hungary) Anna Bondár / (Poland) Magdalena Fręch → replaced by (Argentina) Nicole Fossa Huergo / (Germany) Tamara Korpatsch
- § (Romania) Sorana Cîrstea / Anna Kalinskaya → replaced by (United States) Carmen Corley / (United States) Ivana Corley
- § (Philippines) Alexandra Eala / (Canada) Victoria Mboko → replaced by (Spain) Oksana Selekhmeteva / Anastasia Zakharova
- ‡ (Italy) Sara Errani / (Italy) Jasmine Paolini → replaced by (Italy) Sara Errani / (Austria) Lilli Tagger
- § (Ukraine) Marta Kostyuk / (Romania) Elena-Gabriela Ruse → replaced by (United States) Alycia Parks / (Brazil) Laura Pigossi

‡ – withdrew from entry list
§ – withdrew from main draw
