= 2025 US Open – Women's doubles =

Tennis championship

Women's doubles
- 2025 US Open
- Final date: September 5, 2025

Final
- Champions: (Canada) Gabriela Dabrowski (New Zealand) Erin Routliffe
- Runners-up: (Czech Republic) Kateřina Siniaková (United States) Taylor Townsend
- Score: 6–4, 6–4

Details
- Draw: 64
- Seeds: 16

Events
Singles	men	women		boys	girls
Doubles	men	women	mixed	boys	girls
WC Singles	men	women	quad	boys	girls
WC Doubles	men	women	quad	boys	girls
- US Open

Gabriela Dabrowski and Erin Routliffe defeated Kateřina Siniaková and Taylor Townsend in the final, 6–4, 6–4 to win the women's doubles tennis title at the 2025 US Open. It was the second US Open title (after 2023) and second major title for both players.

Lyudmyla Kichenok and Jeļena Ostapenko were the defending champions, but chose not to compete together this year. Kichenok partnered Ellen Perez, but lost in the first round to Leylah Fernandez and Venus Williams. Ostapenko partnered Barbora Krejčíková, but lost in the first round to Tímea Babos and Luisa Stefani.

Townsend retained the WTA No. 1 doubles ranking by reaching the final. Veronika Kudermetova, Routliffe, Ostapenko and the pair of Sara Errani and Jasmine Paolini were also in contention for the top ranking at the beginning of the tournament.

Hsieh Su-wei was aiming to complete a career Grand Slam in women's doubles. She and her partner Ashlyn Krueger lost in the first round to Cristina Bucșa and Nicole Melichar-Martinez.

For the first time since 1997, all of the top four seeded pairs reached the semifinals.

== Seeds ==
1. (Czech Republic) Kateřina Siniaková / (United States) Taylor Townsend (final)
2. (Italy) Sara Errani / (Italy) Jasmine Paolini (semifinals)
3. (Canada) Gabriela Dabrowski / (New Zealand) Erin Routliffe (champions)
4. Veronika Kudermetova / (Belgium) Elise Mertens (semifinals)
5. Mirra Andreeva / Diana Shnaider (quarterfinals)
6. (Ukraine) Lyudmyla Kichenok / (Australia) Ellen Perez (first round)
7. (United States) Asia Muhammad / (Netherlands) Demi Schuurs (quarterfinals)
8. (China) Guo Hanyu / Alexandra Panova (second round)
9. (Kazakhstan) Anna Danilina / (Serbia) Aleksandra Krunić (third round)
10. (Chinese Taipei) Chan Hao-ching / (China) Jiang Xinyu (first round)
11. (Hungary) Tímea Babos / (Brazil) Luisa Stefani (quarterfinals)
12. Ekaterina Alexandrova / (China) Zhang Shuai (third round)
13. (Spain) Cristina Bucșa / (United States) Nicole Melichar-Martinez (third round)
14. (Brazil) Beatriz Haddad Maia / (Germany) Laura Siegemund (second round)
15. (Slovakia) Tereza Mihalíková / (United Kingdom) Olivia Nicholls (first round)
16. Irina Khromacheva / Kamilla Rakhimova (first round)

Click on the seed number of a player to go to their draw section.

== Draw ==
Key

- Q = Qualifier
- WC = Wild card
- LL = Lucky loser
- Alt = Alternate
- ITF = ITF entry
- PR = Protected ranking
- SR = Special ranking
- SE = Special exempt
- JE = Junior exempt
- JR = Junior Accelerator Programme entrant
- CO = College Accelerator Programme entrant
- NG = Next Gen Accelerator Program entrant
- w/o = Walkover
- r = Retired
- d = Defaulted

=== Finals ===
Quarterfinals
1	(Czech Republic) Kateřina Siniaková (United States) Taylor Townsend	6	6
WC	(Canada) Leylah Fernandez (United States) Venus Williams	1	2
4	Veronika Kudermetova (Belgium) Elise Mertens	6	6
5	Mirra Andreeva; Diana Shnaider	4	2
11	(Hungary) Tímea Babos (Brazil) Luisa Stefani	6	4	4
3	(Canada) Gabriela Dabrowski (New Zealand) Erin Routliffe	0	6	6
7	(United States) Asia Muhammad (Netherlands) Demi Schuurs	1	6^{5}
2	(Italy) Sara Errani (Italy) Jasmine Paolini	6	7^{7}

Semifinals
1	(Czech Republic) Kateřina Siniaková (United States) Taylor Townsend	6	7^{7}
4	Veronika Kudermetova (Belgium) Elise Mertens	3	6^{3}
3	(Canada) Gabriela Dabrowski (New Zealand) Erin Routliffe	6	6
2	(Italy) Sara Errani (Italy) Jasmine Paolini	4	3

Final
1	(Czech Republic) Kateřina Siniaková (United States) Taylor Townsend	4	4
3	(Canada) Gabriela Dabrowski (New Zealand) Erin Routliffe	6	6

=== Top half ===
==== Section 1 ====
First round
1	(Czech Republic) K Siniaková (United States) T Townsend	7	6
(Ukraine) N Kichenok (Indonesia) A Sutjiadi	5	2
(United States) A Parks (Ukraine) D Yastremska	7^{7}	6
(Australia) K Birrell (Australia) O Gadecki	6^{4}	3
A Blinkova (Poland) M Fręch	7	6
P Kudermetova; A Potapova	5	4
(Colombia) C Osorio (China) Y Yuan	6	4	6
15	(Slovakia) T Mihalíková (United Kingdom) O Nicholls	2	6	4
12	E Alexandrova (China) S Zhang	6	6
(Romania) J Cristian (Italy) A Moratelli	2	2
(United Kingdom) K Boulter (United Kingdom) S Kartal	6	5	7^{10}
(United States) S Santamaria (China) Q Tang	1	7	6^{5}
(Norway) U Eikeri (Japan) E Hozumi	6	3	6
(Georgia (country)) O Kalashnikova (Ukraine) Y Starodubtseva	3	6	3
WC	(Canada) L Fernandez (United States) V Williams	7^{7}	6
6	(Ukraine) L Kichenok (Australia) E Perez	6^{4}	3

Second round
1	(Czech Republic) K Siniaková (United States) T Townsend	6	6
(United States) A Parks (Ukraine) D Yastremska	3	3
A Blinkova (Poland) M Fręch	3	4
(Colombia) C Osorio (China) Y Yuan	6	6
12	E Alexandrova (China) S Zhang	6	3	6
(United Kingdom) K Boulter (United Kingdom) S Kartal	4	6	4
(Norway) U Eikeri (Japan) E Hozumi	6^{1}	1
WC	(Canada) L Fernandez (United States) V Williams	7^{7}	6

Third round
1	(Czech Republic) K Siniaková (United States) T Townsend	6	6
(Colombia) C Osorio (China) Y Yuan	2	2
12	E Alexandrova (China) S Zhang	3	4
WC	(Canada) L Fernandez (United States) V Williams	6	6

Quarterfinals
1	(Czech Republic) K Siniaková (United States) T Townsend	6	6
WC	(Canada) L Fernandez (United States) V Williams	1	2

==== Section 2 ====
First round
4	V Kudermetova (Belgium) E Mertens	6	6
Alt	(Spain) Y Cavallé Reimers (Argentina) S Sierra	0	0
WC	(United States) R Brantmeier (United States) A Hamilton	6	1	7^{10}
WC	(United States) T Frodin (United States) K Penickova	3	6	6^{8}
(Spain) J Bouzas Maneiro (Italy) E Cocciaretto	2	1
(Ukraine) M Kostyuk (Romania) E-G Ruse	6	6
PR	(Australia) M Joint (United States) C McNally	4	1
14	(Brazil) B Haddad Maia (Germany) L Siegemund	6	6
10	(Chinese Taipei) H-c Chan (China) X Jiang	7^{8}	4	6^{3}
PR	(Japan) S Aoyama (China) Y Wang	6^{6}	6	7^{10}
(Switzerland) V Golubic (United States) A Li	6	6
(Italy) L Bronzetti (Poland) K Piter	3	4
WC	(United States) H Baptiste (United States) W Osuigwe	1	1
PR	(Australia) S Hunter (United States) D Krawczyk	6	6
(United Kingdom) H Dart (Kazakhstan) Y Putintseva	1	2
5	M Andreeva; D Shnaider	6	6

Second round
4	V Kudermetova (Belgium) E Mertens	6	6
WC	(United States) R Brantmeier (United States) A Hamilton	3	1
(Ukraine) M Kostyuk (Romania) E-G Ruse	6	6
14	(Brazil) B Haddad Maia (Germany) L Siegemund	3	2
PR	(Japan) S Aoyama (China) Y Wang	6	6
(Switzerland) V Golubic (United States) A Li	1	3
PR	(Australia) S Hunter (United States) D Krawczyk	1	3
5	M Andreeva; D Shnaider	6	6

Third round
4	V Kudermetova (Belgium) E Mertens	6	6
(Ukraine) M Kostyuk (Romania) E-G Ruse	4	1
PR	(Japan) S Aoyama (China) Y Wang	5	2
5	M Andreeva; D Shnaider	7	6

Quarterfinals
4	V Kudermetova (Belgium) E Mertens	6	6
5	M Andreeva; D Shnaider	4	2

=== Bottom half ===
==== Section 3 ====
First round
8	(China) H Guo; A Panova	6	6
(Czech Republic) A Dețiuc; E Pridankina	1	3
(China) Y Xu (China) Z Yang	6	5	7
WC	(United States) J Pareja (United States) A Urhobo	0	7	5
(Belgium) M Kempen (Egypt) M Sherif	3	3
WC	(United States) I Jovic (United States) C Ngounoue	6	6
(Czech Republic) B Krejčíková (Latvia) J Ostapenko	6	2	3
11	(Hungary) T Babos (Brazil) L Stefani	4	6	6
13	(Spain) C Bucșa (United States) N Melichar-Martinez	3	7	7^{10}
(Chinese Taipei) S-w Hsieh (United States) A Krueger	6	5	6^{4}
(United States) C Dolehide (United States) S Kenin	6	4	3
(Poland) M Linette (Japan) E Shibahara	4	6	6
(United Kingdom) M Lumsden (Japan) M Ninomiya	3	5
(United States) Q Gleason (Brazil) I Martins	6	7
PR	(Czech Republic) M Škoch (Czech Republic) M Vondroušová	3	0
3	(Canada) G Dabrowski (New Zealand) E Routliffe	6	6

Second round
8	(China) H Guo; A Panova	2	7^{7}	3
(China) Y Xu (China) Z Yang	6	6^{3}	6
WC	(United States) I Jovic (United States) C Ngounoue	4	4
11	(Hungary) T Babos (Brazil) L Stefani	6	6
13	(Spain) C Bucșa (United States) N Melichar-Martinez	5	6	7^{10}
(Poland) M Linette (Japan) E Shibahara	7	2	6^{6}
(United States) Q Gleason (Brazil) I Martins	7^{7}	4	2
3	(Canada) G Dabrowski (New Zealand) E Routliffe	6^{4}	6	6

Third round
(China) Y Xu (China) Z Yang	2	6	4
11	(Hungary) T Babos (Brazil) L Stefani	6	4	6
13	(Spain) C Bucșa (United States) N Melichar-Martinez	4	2
3	(Canada) G Dabrowski (New Zealand) E Routliffe	6	6

Quarterfinals
11	(Hungary) T Babos (Brazil) L Stefani	6	4	4
3	(Canada) G Dabrowski (New Zealand) E Routliffe	0	6	6

==== Section 4 ====
First round
7	(United States) A Muhammad (Netherlands) D Schuurs	6	6
WC	(United States) C Corley (United States) I Corley	2	4
(Mexico) G Olmos (Czech Republic) A Sisková	7^{7}	6
(Czech Republic) L Nosková (Slovakia) R Šramková	6^{2}	4
PR	(Romania) M Niculescu (Latvia) A Sevastova	6	6
PR	(China) S Zheng (China) L Zhu	4	4
PR	(Croatia) A Ružić (Netherlands) B Schoofs	1	1
9	(Kazakhstan) A Danilina (Serbia) A Krunić	6	6
16	I Khromacheva; K Rakhimova	5	1
(Hungary) F Stollár (Chinese Taipei) F-h Wu	7	6
(Japan) M Kato (Mexico) R Zarazúa	6	6
(Switzerland) R Masarova; A Pavlyuchenkova	1	3
(United States) M Kessler (United States) P Stearns	7	6
(Romania) S Cîrstea; A Kalinskaya	5	4
(France) L Boisson (Germany) T Maria	3	5
2	(Italy) S Errani (Italy) J Paolini	6	7

Second round
7	(United States) A Muhammad (Netherlands) D Schuurs	7^{7}	6
(Mexico) G Olmos (Czech Republic) A Sisková	6^{5}	1
PR	(Romania) M Niculescu (Latvia) A Sevastova	2	2
9	(Kazakhstan) A Danilina (Serbia) A Krunić	6	6
(Hungary) F Stollár (Chinese Taipei) F-h Wu	6	6
(Japan) M Kato (Mexico) R Zarazúa	3	2
(United States) M Kessler (United States) P Stearns	4	1
2	(Italy) S Errani (Italy) J Paolini	6	6

Third round
7	(United States) A Muhammad (Netherlands) D Schuurs	6	4	6
9	(Kazakhstan) A Danilina (Serbia) A Krunić	2	6	4
(Hungary) F Stollár (Chinese Taipei) F-h Wu	1	6	3
2	(Italy) S Errani (Italy) J Paolini	6	2	6

Quarterfinals
7	(United States) A Muhammad (Netherlands) D Schuurs	1	6^{5}
2	(Italy) S Errani (Italy) J Paolini	6	7^{7}

== Seeded teams ==
The following are the seeded teams. Seedings are based on WTA rankings as of August 25, 2025.

Country	Player	Country	Player	Rank	Seed
CZE	Kateřina Siniaková	USA	Taylor Townsend	3	1
ITA	Sara Errani	ITA	Jasmine Paolini	8	2
CAN	Gabriela Dabrowski	NZL	Erin Routliffe	15	3
	Veronika Kudermetova	BEL	Elise Mertens	19	4
	Mirra Andreeva		Diana Shnaider	26	5
UKR	Lyudmyla Kichenok	AUS	Ellen Perez	33	6
USA	Asia Muhammad	NED	Demi Schuurs	36	7
CHN	Guo Hanyu		Alexandra Panova	45	8
KAZ	Anna Danilina	SRB	Aleksandra Krunić	46	9
TPE	Chan Hao-ching	CHN	Jiang Xinyu	49	10
HUN	Tímea Babos	BRA	Luisa Stefani	49	11
	Ekaterina Alexandrova	CHN	Zhang Shuai	54	12
ESP	Cristina Bucșa	USA	Nicole Melichar-Martinez	55	13
BRA	Beatriz Haddad Maia	GER	Laura Siegemund	58	14
SVK	Tereza Mihalíková	GBR	Olivia Nicholls	60	15
	Irina Khromacheva		Kamilla Rakhimova	67	16

== Other entry information ==
=== Wildcards ===
- (United States) Hailey Baptiste / (United States) Whitney Osuigwe
- (United States) Reese Brantmeier / (United States) Alanis Hamilton
- (United States) Carmen Corley / (United States) Ivana Corley
- (Canada) Leylah Fernandez / (United States) Venus Williams
- (United States) Thea Frodin / (United States) Kristina Penickova
- (United States) Iva Jovic / (United States) Clervie Ngounoue
- (United States) Julieta Pareja / (United States) Akasha Urhobo

=== Protected ranking ===
- (Japan) Shuko Aoyama / (China) Wang Yafan
- (Australia) Storm Hunter / (United States) Desirae Krawczyk
- (Australia) Maya Joint / (United States) Caty McNally
- (Romania) Monica Niculescu / (Latvia) Anastasija Sevastova
- (Croatia) Antonia Ružić / (Netherlands) Bibiane Schoofs
- (Czech Republic) Miriam Škoch / (Czech Republic) Markéta Vondroušová
- (China) Zheng Saisai / (China) Zhu Lin

=== Alternates ===
- (Spain) Yvonne Cavallé Reimers / (Argentina) Solana Sierra

=== Withdrawals ===
- (Netherlands) Suzan Lamens / (Germany) Eva Lys → replaced by (Spain) Yvonne Cavallé Reimers / (Argentina) Solana Sierra
