= 2025 Austin Challenger – Singles =

Singles
- 2025 Austin Challenger

Final
- Champion: (Mexico) Renata Zarazúa
- Runner-up: (Canada) Marina Stakusic
- Score: 6–4, 3–6, 6–3

Events
Singles	Doubles
Austin Challenger	· 2026 →

Renata Zarazúa won the title, defeating Marina Stakusic in the final, 6–4, 3–6, 6–3.

This was the first edition of the tournament.

== Seeds ==
1. (United States) Iva Jovic (semifinals)
2. (United States) Alycia Parks (first round)
3. (Mexico) Renata Zarazúa (champion)
4. (United States) Caroline Dolehide (first round)
5. (Croatia) Petra Marčinko (first round)
6. (Netherlands) Arantxa Rus (second round)
7. (United States) Whitney Osuigwe (first round)
8. (Czech Republic) Darja Vidmanová (first round)

== Draw ==
Key

- Q = Qualifier
- WC = Wild card
- LL = Lucky loser
- Alt = Alternate
- ITF = ITF entry
- PR = Protected ranking
- SR = Special ranking
- SE = Special exempt
- JE = Junior exempt
- JR = Junior Accelerator Programme entrant
- CO = College Accelerator Programme entrant
- NG = Next Gen Accelerator Program entrant
- w/o = Walkover
- r = Retired
- d = Defaulted

=== Finals ===
Semifinals
1/WC	(United States) Iva Jovic	3	4
(Canada) Marina Stakusic	6	6
3	(Mexico) Renata Zarazúa	6	6
WC	(Romania) Carmen Andreea Herea	4	4

Final
(Canada) Marina Stakusic	4	6	3
3	(Mexico) Renata Zarazúa	6	3	6

=== Top half ===
First round
1/WC	(United States) I Jovic	6	6
(Germany) A-L Friedsam	2	1
(Canada) C Brace	6	5	2
A Gasanova	3	7	6
I Shymanovich	6	2	1
(Canada) K Cross	2	6	6
(United States) M Stoiana	2	6	7
8	(Czech Republic) D Vidmanová	6	1	5
4	(United States) C Dolehide	1	4
(Canada) M Stakusic	6	6
WC	(United States) J Jackson	1	3
Q	(United States) M Lewis	6	6
Q	(United States) C McNeil	0	2
(United States) V Lepchenko	6	6
(United States) L Chirico	6	6
5	(Croatia) P Marčinko	4	4

Second round
1/WC	(United States) I Jovic	6	4	6
A Gasanova	1	6	4
(Canada) K Cross	1	0^{r}
(United States) M Stoiana	6	2
(Canada) M Stakusic	7	6
Q	(United States) M Lewis	5	1
(United States) V Lepchenko	6	6
(United States) L Chirico	2	4

Quarterfinals
1/WC	(United States) I Jovic	6	6
(United States) M Stoiana	0	1
(Canada) M Stakusic	6	6
(United States) V Lepchenko	4	2

Semifinals
1/WC	(United States) I Jovic	3	4
(Canada) M Stakusic	6	6

=== Bottom half ===
First round
6	(Netherlands) A Rus	6	7
(United States) A Rogers	0	5
(United States) E Mandlik	6	6
Q	(United States) V Wolff	2	1
(Japan) M Hontama	6	2	3
Q	(United States) C Liu	4	6	6
(United States) H Inoue	2	1
3	(Mexico) R Zarazúa	6	6
7	(United States) W Osuigwe	5	2
(Netherlands) A Koevermans	7	6
(United States) A Smith	6^{4}	1
WC	(Romania) CA Herea	7^{7}	6
(Japan) H Sakatsume	6	6
(France) J Belgraver	0	0
WC	(United States) M Rapolu	7	6
2	(United States) A Parks	5	4

Second round
6	(Netherlands) A Rus	3	3
(United States) E Mandlik	6	6
Q	(United States) C Liu	6^{4}	7	6^{4}
3	(Mexico) R Zarazúa	7^{7}	5	7^{7}
(Netherlands) A Koevermans	3	2
WC	(Romania) CA Herea	6	6
(Japan) H Sakatsume	4	4
WC	(United States) M Rapolu	6	6

Quarterfinals
(United States) E Mandlik	1	3
3	(Mexico) R Zarazúa	6	6
WC	(Romania) CA Herea	6	6
WC	(United States) M Rapolu	1	3

Semifinals
3	(Mexico) R Zarazúa	6	6
WC	(Romania) CA Herea	4	4

== Qualifying ==
=== Seeds ===
1. (United States) Claire Liu (qualified)
2. (Bulgaria) Lia Karatancheva (qualifying competition)
3. (United States) Vivian Wolff (qualified)
4. (United Kingdom) Emily Appleton (qualifying competition)

=== Qualifiers ===
1. (United States) Claire Liu
2. (United States) Mary Lewis
3. (United States) Vivian Wolff
4. (United States) Christasha McNeil

=== Qualifying draw ===
==== First qualifier ====
Qualifying competition
1	(United States) Claire Liu	6	7
	(Slovakia) Eszter Méri	4	5

==== Second qualifier ====
Qualifying competition
2	(Bulgaria) Lia Karatancheva	2	0
	(United States) Mary Lewis	6	6

==== Third qualifier ====
Qualifying competition
3	(United States) Vivian Wolff	6	6
	Maria Kozyreva	1	1

==== Fourth qualifier ====
Qualifying competition
4	(United Kingdom) Emily Appleton	3	3
WC	(United States) Christasha McNeil	6	6
