= 2025 Austin Challenger – Doubles =

Doubles
- 2025 Austin Challenger

Final
- Champion: Maria Kozyreva; Iryna Shymanovich
- Runner-up: (United States) Carmen Corley (United States) Ivana Corley
- Score: 6–3, 7–6^{(7–4)}

Events
Singles	Doubles
Austin Challenger	· 2026 →

Maria Kozyreva and Iryna Shymanovich won the title, defeating Carmen and Ivana Corley in the final, 6–3, 7–6^{(7–4)}.

This was the first edition of the tournament.

== Seeds ==
1. Maria Kozyreva / Iryna Shymanovich (champions)
2. (United Kingdom) Emily Appleton / (Canada) Kayla Cross (quarterfinals)

== Draw ==
Key

- Q = Qualifier
- WC = Wild card
- LL = Lucky loser
- Alt = Alternate
- ITF = ITF entry
- PR = Protected ranking
- SR = Special ranking
- SE = Special exempt
- JE = Junior exempt
- JR = Junior Accelerator Programme entrant
- CO = College Accelerator Programme entrant
- NG = Next Gen Accelerator Program entrant
- w/o = Walkover
- r = Retired
- d = Defaulted

=== Draw ===
Quarterfinals
1	M Kozyreva; I Shymanovich	6	6
(United States) C Harrison (United States) A Smith	2	4
(United States) E Mandlik (Mexico) R Zarazúa	3	6^{4}
(Germany) A-L Friedsam (Netherlands) A Rus	6	7^{7}
WC	(United States) J Jackson (United States) M Lewis	4	2
(United States) C Corley (United States) I Corley	6	6
(United States) L Chirico (United States) C Liu	6	7
2	(United Kingdom) E Appleton (Canada) K Cross	4	5

Semifinals
1	M Kozyreva; I Shymanovich	5	6	[10]
(Germany) A-L Friedsam (Netherlands) A Rus	7	3	[4]
(United States) C Corley (United States) I Corley	7^{7}	6
(United States) L Chirico (United States) C Liu	6^{5}	1

Final
1	M Kozyreva; I Shymanovich	6	7^{7}
(United States) C Corley (United States) I Corley	3	6^{4}
