= Austin Challenger =

- 2026 Austin Challenger

WTA 125
- Event name: Austin 125
- Location: Austin, United States
- Venue: Austin Tennis Academy
- Category: WTA 125
- Surface: Hard
- Draw: 32S/8Q/8D
- Prize money: $115,000

Current champions (2026)
- Singles: (Thailand) Lanlana Tararudee
- Doubles: (Chinese Taipei) Chan Hao-ching (Japan) Miyu Kato

The Austin Challenger is a tournament for professional female tennis players played on outdoor hardcourts. The event is classified as a WTA 125 tournament and is held at the Austin Tennis Academy in Austin, United States.

== Past finals ==
=== Singles ===
Year	Champion	Runners-up	Score
2025	(Mexico) Renata Zarazúa	(Canada) Marina Stakusic	6–4, 3–6, 6–3
2026	(Thailand) Lanlana Tararudee	(Canada) Bianca Andreescu	6–3, 3–6, 6–3

=== Doubles ===
Year	Champions	Runners-up	Score
2025	Maria Kozyreva; Iryna Shymanovich	(United States) Carmen Corley (United States) Ivana Corley	6–3, 7–6^{(7–4)}
2026	(Chinese Taipei) Chan Hao-ching (Japan) Miyu Kato	(Netherlands) Isabelle Haverlag (United States) Sabrina Santamaria	6–2, 6–3
