= Marina Stakusic =

Canadian tennis player (born 2004)

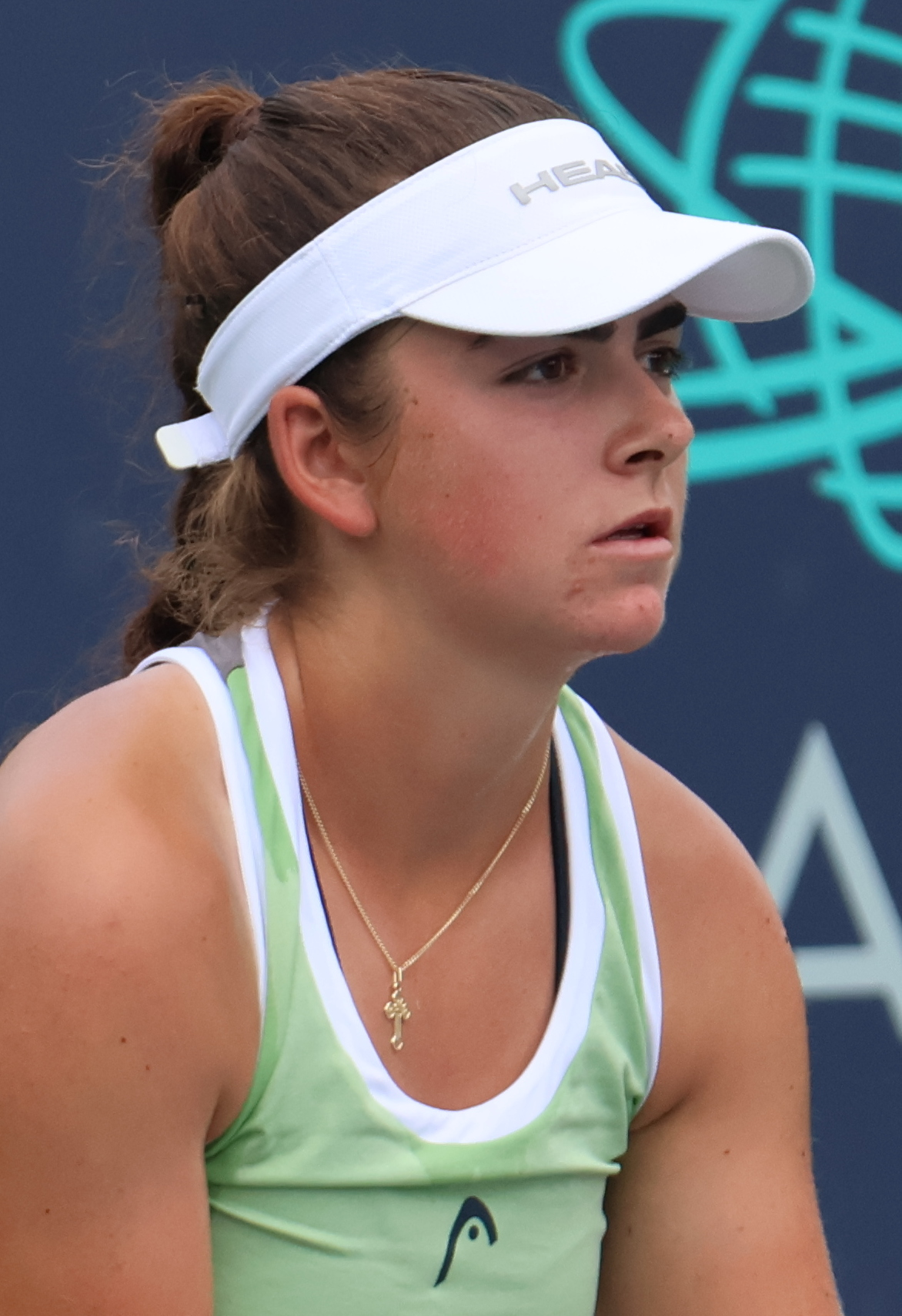
- Stakusic at the 2024 Washington Open
- Country (sports): Canada
- Residence: Mississauga, Ontario
- Born: 27 November 2004 (age 21) Mississauga, Ontario
- Height: 1.74 m (5 ft 9 in)
- Turned pro: 2022
- Plays: Right (two-handed backhand)
- Coach: Rob Steckley
- Prize money: $681,945

Singles
- Career record: 122–85
- Career titles: 1 WTA 125
- Highest ranking: No. 114 (February 24, 2025)
- Current ranking: No. 198 (September 28, 2026)

Grand Slam singles results
- Australian Open: 1R (2026)
- French Open: Q3 (2024)
- Wimbledon: 1R (2024)
- US Open: Q1 (2024, 2025)

Doubles
- Career record: 17–14
- Career titles: 1 ITF
- Highest ranking: No. 448 (August 14, 2023)
- Current ranking: No. 1,282 (September 28, 2026)

Team competitions
- BJK Cup: W (2023), record 3–1
- Last updated on: September 29, 2026.

Marina Stakusic (Serbian Cyrillic: Марина Стакушић, romanized: Marina Stakušić; born 27 November 2004) is a Canadian professional tennis player. She has a career-high singles ranking of No. 114 by the WTA, achieved on 24 February 2025, and a best doubles ranking of No. 448, reached on 14 August 2023. Stakusic was a member of the Canadian team which won the 2023 Billie Jean King Cup. She has won one WTA 125 singles title as well as four singles titles and one doubles title on the ITF Circuit.

== Early life ==
Stakusic is from Mississauga. Her father is a Montenegrin who emigrated to Canada at the age of 25, while her mother was born in Canada to parents who emigrated from Serbia. Her brother, Marko Stakusic, is also a professional tennis player. She began playing tennis at the age of five.

== Career highlights ==
=== 2022: WTA Tour debut ===
Stakusic made her WTA Tour main-draw debut at the Championnats de Granby where she defeated Jaimee Fourlis in the first round, before losing to 10th seed Marta Kostyuk.

=== 2023: BJK Cup winner ===
Although Stakusic did not play any WTA Tour main-draw matches in 2023, she was named in the Canadian team for the BJK Cup Finals in November. Ranked at world No. 261, she won three of her four singles matches, all against top-65 opponents. Stakusic defeated Rebeka Masarova and Magdalena Fręch in her team's group stage victories over Spain and Poland respectively, before losing to Barbora Krejčíková in the 2–1 semifinal success against the Czech Republic. In the final, she overcame Martina Trevisan in the opening match as Canada defeated Italy 2–0 to claim their first BJK Cup title.

=== 2024: Major debut, first WTA 125 title ===
Stakusic qualified for her first WTA 500 tournament at the San Diego Open and defeated fellow qualifier Marina Melnikova, her second win in only her second main-draw at a WTA Tour event. She lost her next match to seventh seed Donna Vekić in three sets.

Ranked No. 164, she qualified for Wimbledon making her major tournament debut, but lost in the first round to 27th seed Katerina Siniaková

Stakusic received a wildcard entry for her home tournament, the WTA 1000 Canadian Open, and recorded her first win at this level defeating qualifier Erika Andreeva in three sets. She lost in the second round to lucky loser Taylor Townsend. As a result, she made it into the top 150, at world No. 143, on 12 August 2024.

Having received a wildcard for the main-draw at the Guadalajara Open, Stakusic defeated Anna Karolína Schmiedlová in the opening round and then upset top seed and world No. 12, Jelena Ostapenko, in three sets for her first win against a top-20 ranked player and to reach her maiden WTA Tour quarterfinal. She lost in the last eight to fifth seed Magdalena Fręch.

As a qualifier, Stakusic won the WTA 125 Abierto Tampico in Mexico to claim the biggest title of her career to date, defeating Anastasiia Sobolieva, seventh seed Robin Montgomery Lucrezia Stefanini and sixth seed Sara Sorribes Tormo, before overcoming fifth seed Anna Blinkova in a three-set final lasting two hours and 43 minutes. The following week she defeated Maya Joint in the first round at the WTA 250 Mérida Open, before losing her next match to Nina Stojanović.

=== 2025: Guadalajara quarterfinal ===
Stakusic qualified for the Transylvania Open and overcame Sorana Cîrstea to reach the second round, where she was defeated by lucky loser Aliaksandra Sasnovich.

Again as a qualifier at the WTA 500 Guadalajara Open, she defeated Polina Kudermetova and third seed Jeļena Ostapenko, before losing in the quarterfinals to Emiliana Arango.

In November, she reached her second WTA 125 final at the Austin Challenger, losing to third seed Renata Zarazúa in three sets.

=== 2026: Australian Open, Indian Wells debuts ===
Stakusic qualified to make her debut main-draw appearance at the Australian Open. Playing in temperatures reaching 29 degrees Celsius, she suffered severe leg cramps while trailing in the third set of her first-round match against Priscilla Hon and was forced to retire, leaving the court in a wheelchair. In March, she qualified to make her main-draw debut at the WTA 1000 event in Indian Wells, but lost in the first round to Anastasia Potapova. Later that month, Stakusic withdrew from the Canadian squad for their BJK Cup qualifier against Kazakhstan due to a back injury.

== Performance timeline ==
Key
W	F	SF	QF	#R	RR	Q#	DNQ	A	NH

(W) winner; (F) finalist; (SF) semifinalist; (QF) quarterfinalist; (#R) rounds 4, 3, 2, 1; (RR) round-robin stage; (Q#) qualification round; (DNQ) did not qualify; (A) absent; (NH) not held; (SR) strike rate (events won / competed); (W–L) win–loss record.
To avoid confusion and double counting, these charts are updated at the conclusion of a tournament or when the player's participation has ended.

Only WTA Tour and Grand Slam tournaments main draw and Billie Jean King Cup results are considered in the career statistics.

Current through the 2026 Indian Wells Open.

Tournament	2022	2023	2024	2025	2026	SR	W–L
Grand Slam tournaments
Australian Open	A	A	A	Q1	1R	0 / 1	0–1
French Open	A	A	Q3	Q2	A	0 / 0	0–0
Wimbledon	A	A	1R	A	A	0 / 1	0–1
US Open	A	A	Q1	Q1	A	0 / 0	0–0
National representation
Billie Jean King Cup	A	W	A	A		1 / 1	3–1
WTA 1000 tournaments
Indian Wells Open	A	A	A	Q1	1R	0 / 1	0–1
Canadian Open	Q2	Q1	2R	1R	A	0 / 2	1–2
Career statistics
Tournaments	1	0	2	1	2	Career total: 6	
Overall win–loss	0–0	3–1	1–2	0–1	0–2	4–6	
Year-end ranking	382	258	127	131			

== WTA 125 finals ==
=== Singles: 2 (1 title, 1 runner-up) ===
Result	W–L	Date	Tournament	Surface	Opponent	Score
Win	1–0	Oct 2024	Abierto Tampico, Mexico	Hard	Anna Blinkova	6–4, 2–6, 6–4
Loss	1–1	Nov 2025	Austin Challenger, United States	Hard	(Mexico) Renata Zarazúa	4–6, 6–3, 3–6

== ITF Circuit finals ==
=== Singles: 5 (4 titles, 1 runner-up) ===
Legend W100 tournaments (1–1) W60 tournaments (2–0) W25 tournaments (1–0)	Finals by surface Hard (4–1)

Result	W–L	Date	Tournament	Tier	Surface	Opponent	Score
Win	1–0	Sep 2023	ITF Valladolid, Spain	W25	Hard	Anna Kubareva	3–6, 7–5, 6–3
Win	2–0	Sep 2023	Berkeley Challenge, United States	W60	Hard	(United States) Allie Kiick	6–3, 6–4
Win	3-0	Oct 2023	Toronto Challenger, Canada	W60	Hard	(Croatia) Jana Fett	3–6, 7–5, 6–3
Loss	3-1	Oct 2025	Edmond Open, United States	W100	Hard	(United States) Elizabeth Mandlik	3–6, 5–7
Win	4-1	Nov 2025	Guanajuato Open, Mexico	W100	Hard	(United States) Elvina Kalieva	6–2, 6–2

=== Doubles: 2 (1 title, 1 runner-up) ===
Legend W60 tournaments (0–1) W25 tournaments (1–0)	Finals by surface Hard (1–1)

Result	W–L	Date	Tournament	Tier	Surface	Partner	Opponents	Score
Win	1–0	Jul 2022	ITF Saskatoon, Canada	W25	Hard	(Canada) Kayla Cross	(United States) Kendra Bunch (Serbia) Katarina Kozarov	6–3, 7–6^{(4)}
Loss	1–1	Nov 2022	Calgary Challenger, Canada	W60	Hard (i)	(Canada) Kayla Cross	(United States) Catherine Harrison (United States) Sabrina Santamaria	6–7^{(2)}, 4–6

== Team competition ==
=== Billie Jean King Cup final ===
Result	Date	Tournament	Surface	Team	Partners	Opponent team	Opponent players	Score
Win	Nov 2023	Billie Jean King Cup	Hard (i)	Canada	Leylah Fernandez; Rebecca Marino; Eugenie Bouchard; Gabriela Dabrowski	Italy	Jasmine Paolini; Martina Trevisan; Elisabetta Cocciaretto; Lucia Bronzetti; Lucrezia Stefanini	2–0
