= Ivana Corley =

American tennis player (born 1999)

- Country (sports): United States
- Born: September 11, 1999 (age 26) Albuquerque, United States
- Plays: Right-handed
- College: Oklahoma
- Prize money: $118,988

Singles
- Career record: 24–32
- Highest ranking: No. 1,050 (July 18, 2022)

Doubles
- Career record: 102–72
- Career titles: 3 WTA 125
- Highest ranking: No. 86 (May 4, 2026)
- Current ranking: No. 113 (August 3, 2026)

Grand Slam doubles results
- French Open: 1R (2026)
- US Open: 2R (2024)
- Last updated on: 10 August 2026.

Ivana Corley (born September 11, 1999) is an American tennis player.

Corley has a career-high doubles ranking of 86 by the WTA, achieved on May 26, 2026.

She won her first bigger ITF title at the 2022 Las Vegas Open, in the doubles draw, partnering her sister Carmen.

Corley plays college tennis at the University of Oklahoma.

The Corley sisters were given a wildcard entry into the 2024 US Open, winning their first round match against Ekaterina Alexandrova and Anna Blinkova in straight sets. They lost in the second round to tenth seeds Veronika Kudermetova and Chan Hao-ching in a match lasting more than three hours.

They won the doubles title at the 2025 WTA 125 Hall of Fame Open, defeating Arianne Hartono and Prarthana Thombare in the final.

== WTA 125 finals ==
=== Doubles: 6 (3 titles, 3 runner-ups) ===
Result	W–L	Date	Tournament	Surface	Partner	Opponents	Score
Win	1–0	Jul 2025	Hall of Fame Open, United States	Grass	(United States) Carmen Corley	(Netherlands) Arianne Hartono (India) Prarthana Thombare	7–6^{(4)}, 6–3
Win	2–0	Jul 2025	Porto Open, Portugal	Hard	(United States) Carmen Corley	(Chinese Taipei) Liang En-shuo (Thailand) Peangtarn Plipuech	6–3, 6–1
Loss	2–1	Nov 2025	Austin Challenger, United States	Hard	(United States) Carmen Corley	(Belarus) Iryna Shymanovich (Russia) Maria Kozyreva	3–6, 6–7^{(4–7)}
Win	3–1	Feb 2026	Oeiras Indoors, Portugal	Hard	(United States) Carmen Corley	(United Kingdom) Emily Appleton (Japan) Makoto Ninomiya	2–6, 6–0, [10–4]
Loss	3–2	Feb 2026	Oeiras Indoors 2, Portugal	Hard (i)	(United States) Carmen Corley	(Slovakia) Viktória Hrunčáková (Czech Republic) Gabriela Knutson	6–7^{(7–9)}, 3–6
Loss	3–3	May 2026	Open de Saint-Malo, France	Clay	(Chinese Taipei) Chan Hao-ching	(Netherlands) Isabelle Haverlag (United Kingdom) Maia Lumsden	4–6, 0–6

== ITF Circuit finals ==
=== Doubles: 13 (8 titles, 5 runner-ups) ===
Legend
W100 tournaments
W60/75 tournaments
W35 tournaments
W15 tournaments

Result	W–L	Date	Tournament	Tier	Surface	Partner	Opponents	Score
Loss	0–1	Dec 2019	ITF Norman, United States	W15	Hard	(United States) Carmen Corley	(Australia) Lisa Mays (United Kingdom) Nell Miller	6–7^{(5)}, 6–4, [8–10]
Loss	0–2	Sep 2021	ITF Lubbock, United States	W15	Hard	(United States) Carmen Corley	(France) Tiphanie Lemaître (Chile) Fernanda Labraña	4–6, 7–6^{(2)}, [8–10]
Win	1–2	Jun 2022	ITF Colorado Springs, United States	W15	Hard	(United States) Carmen Corley	(Poland) Daria Kuczer; Veronika Miroshnichenko	7–6^{(4)}, 6–2
Win	2–2	Oct 2022	Las Vegas Open, United States	W60	Hard	(United States) Carmen Corley	(Serbia) Katarina Kozarov; Veronika Miroshnichenko	6–2, 6–0
Loss	2–3	Jul 2023	Championnats de Granby, Canada	W100	Clay	(United States) Carmen Corley	(Mexico) Marcela Zacarías (Mexico) Renata Zarazúa	3–6, 3–6
Win	3–3	Oct 2023	Toronto Challenger, Canada	W60	Hard (i)	(United States) Carmen Corley	(Canada) Kayla Cross (United States) Liv Hovde	6–7^{(6)}, 6–3, [10–3]
Win	4–3	Mar 2024	ITF Santo Domingo, Dominican Republic	W35	Hard	(United States) Carmen Corley	(Spain) Leyre Romero Gormaz (Italy) Camilla Rosatello	6–3, 6–7^{(3)}, [10–5]
Win	5–3	Mar 2024	ITF Santo Domingo, Dominican Republic	W35	Hard	(United States) Carmen Corley	(Bulgaria) Lia Karatancheva (United States) Rasheeda McAdoo	6–1, 6–7^{(5)}, [12–10]
Loss	5–4	Apr 2024	Bellinzona Ladies Open, Switzerland	W75	Clay	(United States) Carmen Corley	(Czech Republic) Jesika Malečková (Switzerland) Conny Perrin	7–6^{(4)}, 6–7^{(7)}, [7–10]
Loss	5–5	Jul 2024	Lexington Challenger, United States	W75	Hard	(United States) Carmen Corley	(United States) Whitney Osuigwe (United States) Alana Smith	6–7^{(5)}, 3–6
Win	6–5	May 2025	ITF Bethany Beach, United States	W35	Clay	(United States) Jaeda Daniel	(Japan) Haruna Arakawa (United States) Haley Giavara	6–4, 7–5
Win	7–5	Aug 2025	Landisville Tennis Challenge, United States	W100	Hard	(United States) Carmen Corley	(Brazil) Ingrid Martins (Switzerland) Simona Waltert	4–6, 7–6^{(4)}, [12–10]
Win	8–5	Jan 2026	ITF Bradenton, United States	W35	Hard	(United States) Carmen Corley	(United States) Jaeda Daniel (United States) Dalayna Hewitt	4–6, 6–3, [10–5]
