= Iva Jovic =

American tennis player (born 2007)

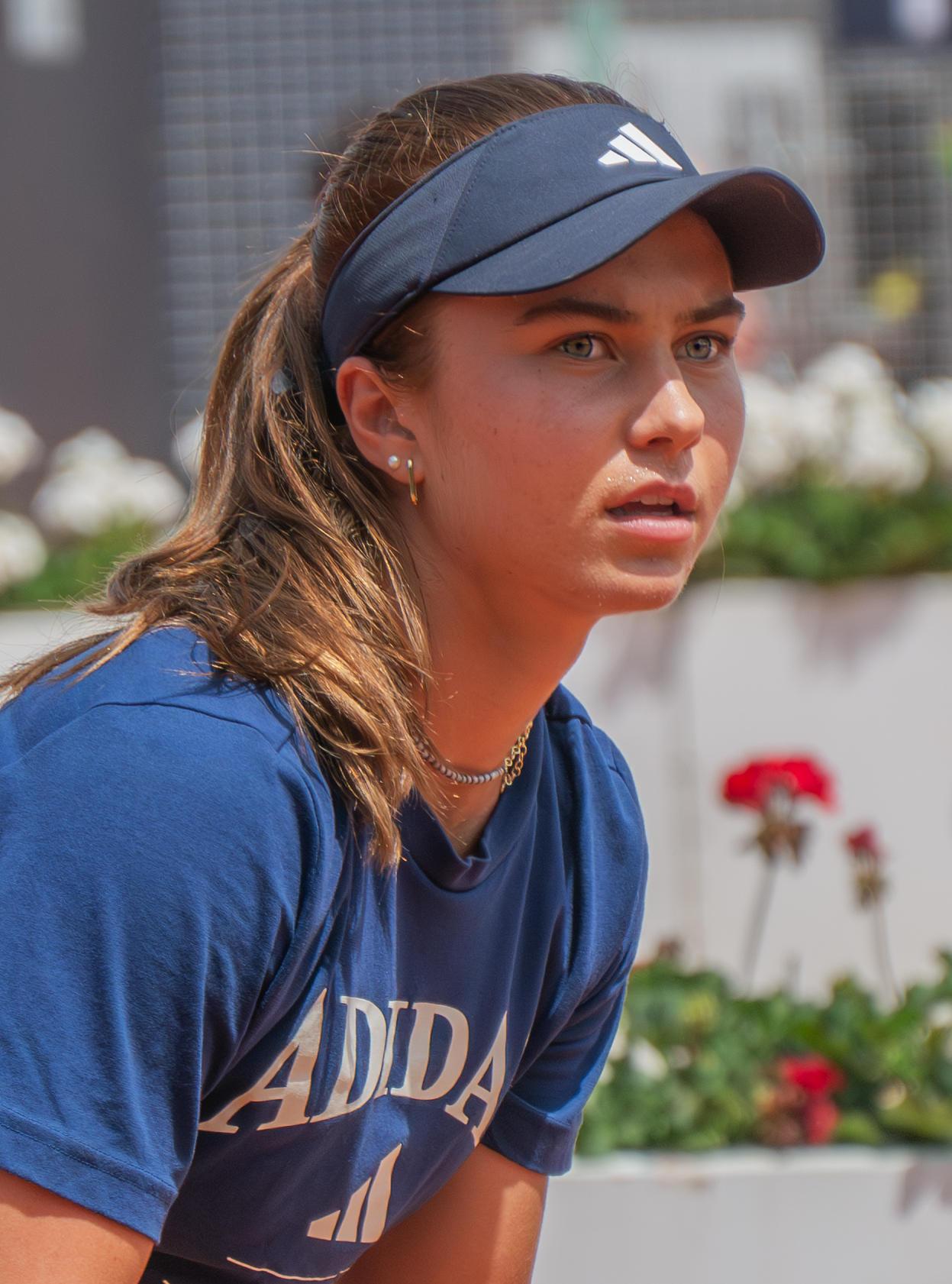
- Jovic at the 2026 Italian Open
- Country (sports): United States
- Residence: Torrance, California, US
- Born: December 6, 2007 (age 18) Torrance, California, US
- Height: 1.73 m (5 ft 8 in)
- Turned pro: 2022
- Plays: Right (two-handed backhand)
- Coach: Thomas Gutteridge
- Prize money: $3,888,981

Singles
- Career record: 122–51
- Career titles: 2
- Highest ranking: No. 11 (October 12, 2026)
- Current ranking: No. 13 (November 2, 2026)

Grand Slam singles results
- Australian Open: QF (2026)
- French Open: 3R (2026)
- Wimbledon: 4R (2026)
- US Open: 4R (2026)

Doubles
- Career record: 21–19
- Career titles: 0
- Highest ranking: No. 64 (August 24, 2026)
- Current ranking: No. 76 (November 2, 2026)

Grand Slam doubles results
- Australian Open: 2R (2026)
- French Open: 2R (2026)
- Wimbledon: 1R (2026)
- US Open: 2R (2025)

Grand Slam mixed doubles results
- US Open: 2R (2024)
- Last updated on: November 2, 2026.

Iva Jovic (born December 6, 2007) is an American professional tennis player. She has a career-high singles ranking of No. 11 by the WTA, achieved on October 12, 2026, and a career-high doubles ranking of world No. 64, achieved on August 24, 2026. She has won two WTA Tour singles titles, both at the Guadalajara Open, in 2025 and 2026. Her best Grand Slam singles result is reaching the quarterfinals of the 2026 Australian Open.

As a junior, Jovic reached a career-high ITF junior combined ranking of world No. 2 in 2024. She won two junior Grand Slam doubles titles, at the Australian Open and Wimbledon, partnering compatriot Tyra Caterina Grant.

== Early life ==
Iva Jovic was born on December 6, 2007 in Torrance, California, to Bojan and Jelena Jovic, who emigrated to the United States in the early 2000s. Her father is from Leskovac, Serbia, while her mother was born in Split, Croatia. Both parents are pharmacists. She has an older sister, Mia, who played college tennis at the University of California, Los Angeles (UCLA). Jovic grew up speaking Serbian at home and regularly visited relatives in Serbia.

Jovic began playing tennis at the age of five, initially practicing with her older sister on the tennis courts of their apartment complex in Torrance. She also participated in other sports during childhood, including soccer, gymnastics and swimming. At the age of eleven, she began training under Peter Smith at the Jack Kramer Club in Rolling Hills Estates, California. During the COVID-19 pandemic in 2020, she began focusing more seriously on tennis, increasing her training at the United States Tennis Association's training facility in Carson, California.

== Career ==
=== Juniors ===
In December 2021, Jovic won the girls' under-14 singles title at the Junior Orange Bowl.

In November 2022, Jovic was part of the US team that won the Junior Billie Jean King Cup, alongside Clervie Ngounoue and Valerie Glozman. The following month, she partnered Tyra Caterina Grant to win the girls' doubles title at the Orange Bowl in Plantation, Florida.

In November 2023, Jovic helped the United States defend its junior BJK Cup title, this time alongside Grant and Alanis Hamilton. The team won the tournament without dropping a set, with Jovic clinching the final against the Czech Republic by defeating Laura Samson. In December, Jovic and Grant successfully defended their Orange Bowl doubles title, becoming the first pair in 30 years to win the event in consecutive years.

In 2024, Jovic and Grant won the girls' doubles title at the Australian Open without dropping a set. They subsequently reached the final of the French Open, before winning their second junior Grand Slam doubles title at the Wimbledon Championships.

In singles, Jovic reached the semifinals of the junior events at both Wimbledon and the US Open. In August, she won the singles and doubles titles at the USTA Girls' 18s National Championships, earning a wildcard into the women's singles main draw at the US Open. She finished the year ranked world No. 2 in the ITF junior combined rankings.

=== 2022–23: Pro debut, first ITF Circuit title ===
In June 2022, Jovic made her professional debut as a wildcard at the 15k SoCal Pro Circuit Jack Kramer Club event in Los Angeles, where she reached the final. In October 2023, she won her first title at the 25k Ascension Project Women's Open in Redding.

=== 2024: Major debut and first win ===
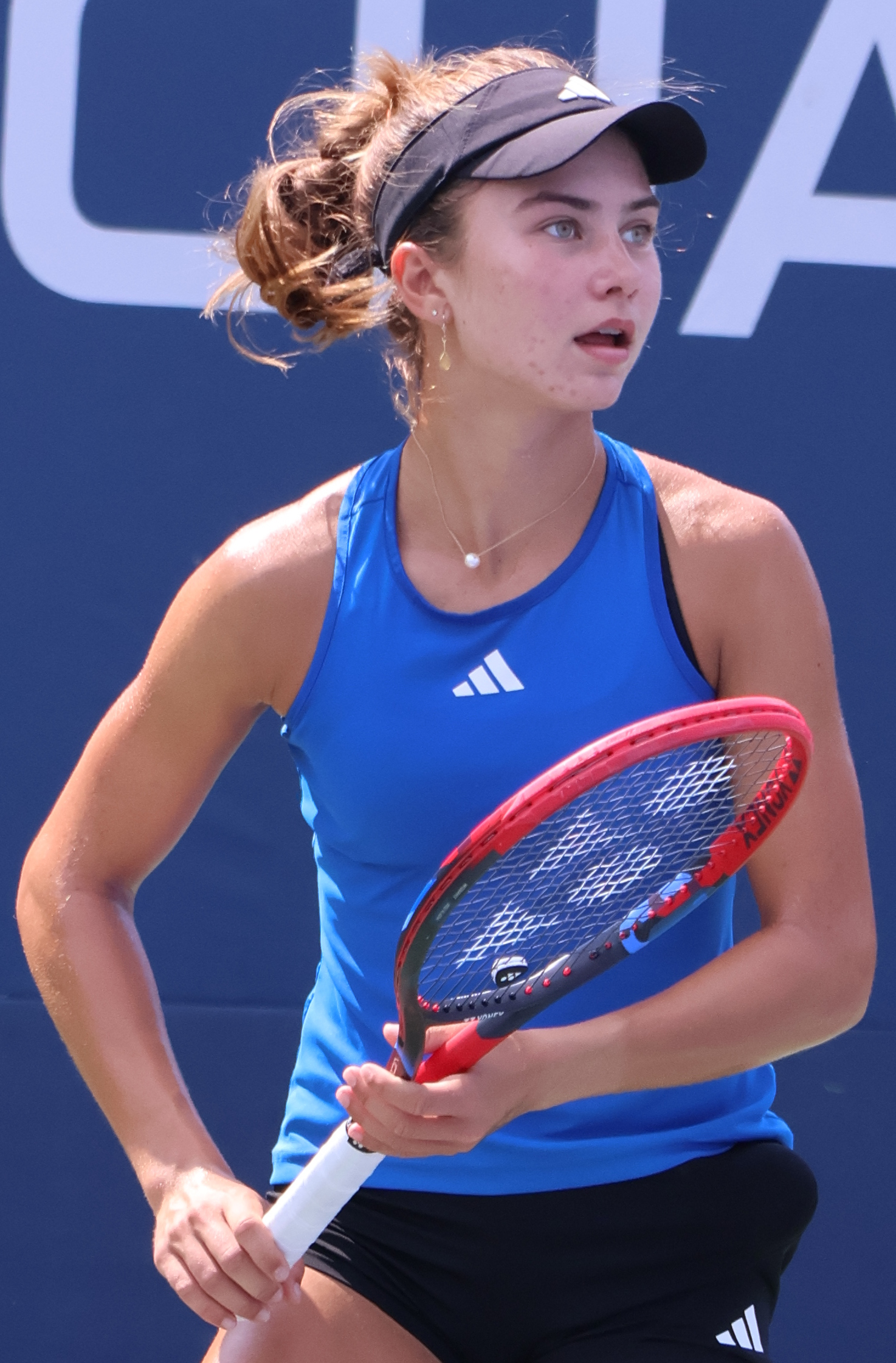
Jovic at the 2024 US Open

She made her debut at the 2024 US Open, after receiving a wildcard for the main-draw in singles and doubles, after a victory in the USTA Girls 18s National Championships. She was the youngest player in the tournament. Jovic recorded her first major and WTA Tour win over Magda Linette, becoming the youngest American to win a women's main-draw match at the US Open since 2000. She lost in the second round to 29th seed Ekaterina Alexandrova in three sets.

=== 2025: WTA Tour title, top 50 ===
Jovic entered the main draw at the Australian Open for the first time, after winning the USTA's Wild Card Challenge, and defeated Nuria Párrizas Díaz in the first round. She lost her next match to sixth seed Elena Rybakina.

In Indian Wells, Jovic reached the second round on her WTA 1000 debut as a wildcard entrant, defeating Julia Grabher in three sets and recording her first WTA 1000-level win. In the second round, she lost to sixth seed Jasmine Paolini, in three sets.

Jovic gained a wildcard entry into the French Open by winning the USTA's Roland Garros Wild Card Challenge. She defeated Renata Zarazúa in the first round, before losing to 12th seed Elena Rybakina for the second successive major.

In June, she won her first WTA 125 title at the Ilkley Open defeating Rebecca Marino in the final. Following this success, Jovic achieved another milestone by making her top 100 debut on June 16, 2025. Later that month, she qualified to make her main-draw debut at Wimbledon, where she lost to Suzan Lamens in the first round.

In August, Jovic entered the main draw at the Cincinnati Open and defeated fellow lucky loser Solana Sierra and 20th seed Linda Nosková to reach the third round of a WTA Tour event for the first time in her career. Her run was ended by Barbora Krejčíková. Later that month at the Tennis in Cleveland, she overcame fourth seed Anastasia Potapova, before losing to Ann Li. At the US Open, Jovic defeated Aliaksandra Sasnovich, but lost her next match to Jasmine Paolini.

The following month at the Guadalajara Open, Jovic won her first WTA Tour title, saving a match point in the quarterfinals against Andorran player Victoria Jiménez Kasintseva, and defeating Colombian player Emiliana Arango in the final. As a result, she climbed in the rankings to world No. 36 on September 15, 2025.

=== 2026: Guadalajara title, major quarters, top 20 ===
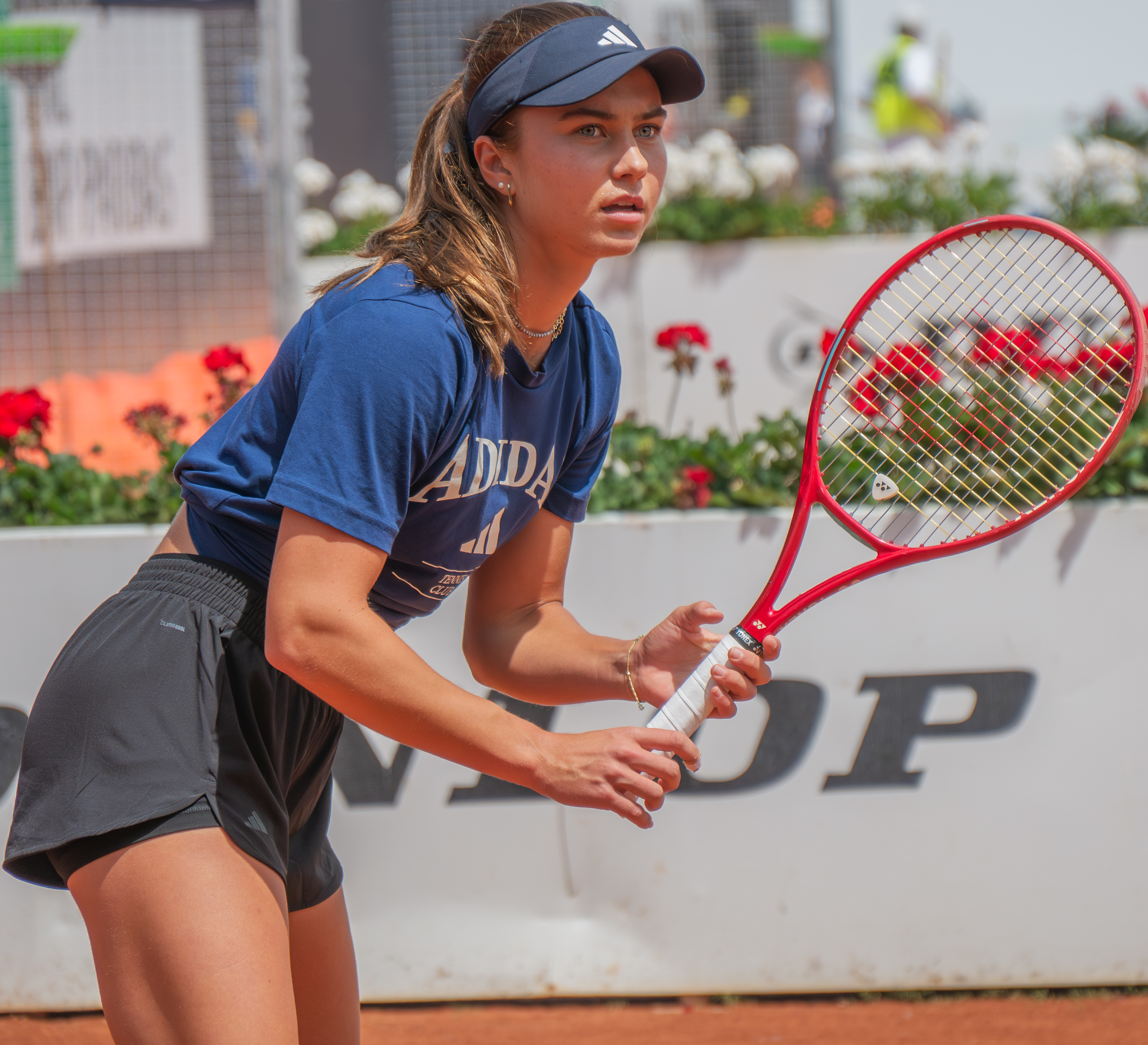
Jovic at the 2026 Italian Open

Jovic reached the final in Hobart, where she lost to qualifier Elisabetta Cocciaretto.

At the age of 18 years and a month old, Jovic reached a major third round for the first time at the 2026 Australian Open defeating Katie Volynets and Priscilla Hon. Next, she defeated world No. 8, Jasmine Paolini, to earn her first top-10 win. In the fourth round, she defeated Yulia Putintseva in 53 minutes, losing only one game to reach her first Grand Slam tournament quarterfinal. She became the youngest American to reach the Australian Open women's singles quarterfinals since Venus Williams in 1998. Despite her loss in the quarterfinals to world No. 1, Aryna Sabalenka, Jovic reached the top 20 on February 2, 2026.

At the 2026 French Open, Jovic was the 17th seed and defeated Alexandra Eala and Emma Navarro in straight sets, before falling to Naomi Osaka in three sets. At Wimbledon, she reached the fourth round losing to compatriot Jessica Pegula, in three sets. At the US Open, she defeated Magdalena Fręch, Francesca Jones, and Alexandra Eala to reach the fourth round, before being beaten by compatriot Coco Gauff, in straight sets. She became the youngest American woman since Venus Williams in 1998 to reach the fourth round in three different majors in the same season. Later that month, she retained her title at the Guadalajara Open with a straight sets win over compatriot Peyton Stearns in the final, and moved to a career-high world ranking of number 13.

Following her quarterfinal exit from the 2026 Ningbo Open, Jovic was the target of extensive online abuse, which she publicly condemned as "insane". This marked the second instance in several weeks of a prominent young American tennis player addressing online harassment, following similar statements made by Coco Gauff regarding racist abuse she had received during the 2026 China Open.

== Career statistics ==
=== Grand Slam tournament performance timelines ===
Key
| W | F | SF | QF | #R | RR | Q# | DNQ | A | NH |

(W) winner; (F) finalist; (SF) semifinalist; (QF) quarterfinalist; (#R) rounds 4, 3, 2, 1; (RR) round-robin stage; (Q#) qualification round; (DNQ) did not qualify; (A) absent; (NH) not held; (SR) strike rate (events won / competed); (W–L) win–loss record.
To avoid confusion and double counting, these charts are updated at the conclusion of a tournament or when the player's participation has ended.

==== Singles ====
| Tournament | 2024 | 2025 | 2026 | SR | W–L | Win % |
|---|---|---|---|---|---|---|
| Australian Open | A | 2R | QF | 0 / 2 | 5–2 | 71% |
| French Open | A | 2R | 3R | 0 / 2 | 3–2 | 60% |
| Wimbledon | A | 1R | 4R | 0 / 2 | 3–2 | 60% |
| US Open | 2R | 2R | 4R | 0 / 3 | 5–3 | 63% |
| Win–Loss | 1–1 | 3–4 | 12–4 | 0 / 9 | 16–9 | 64% |
