= Carmen Corley =

American tennis player (born 2001)

- Country (sports): United States
- Born: September 17, 2001 (age 24) Albuquerque, United States
- College: Oklahoma
- Prize money: $123,570

Singles
- Career record: 29–31
- Highest ranking: No. 881 (October 2, 2023)

Doubles
- Career record: 115–79
- Career titles: 4 WTA 125
- Highest ranking: No. 82 (August 18, 2025)
- Current ranking: No. 129 (August 3, 2026)

Grand Slam doubles results
- French Open: 1R (2026)
- US Open: 2R (2024)
- Last updated on: 10 August 2026.

Carmen Corley (born September 17, 2001) is an American tennis player.

Corley has a career-high doubles ranking by the WTA of 82, achieved on August 18, 2025.

She won her first major ITF title at the 2022 Las Vegas Open, in the doubles draw, partnering her sister Ivana.

Corley plays college tennis at the University of Oklahoma.

The Corley sisters were given a wildcard entry into the 2024 US Open, winning their first round match against Ekaterina Alexandrova and Anna Blinkova in straight sets. They lost in the second round to tenth seeds Veronika Kudermetova and Chan Hao-ching in a match lasting more than three hours.

Partnering Rebecca Marino, she won the biggest title of her career to date at the 2024 WTA 125 Abierto Tampico, defeating Alina Korneeva and Polina Kudermetova in the final.

Reuniting with her sister, she won the doubles title at the 2025 WTA 125 Hall of Fame Open, overcoming Arianne Hartono and Prarthana Thombare in the final.

== WTA 125 finals ==
=== Doubles: 6 (4 titles, 2 runner-ups) ===
Result	W–L	Date	Tournament	Surface	Partner	Opponents	Score
Win	1–0	Oct 2024	Abierto Tampico, Mexico	Hard	(Canada) Rebecca Marino	Alina Korneeva; Polina Kudermetova	6–3, 6–3
Win	2–0	Jul 2025	Hall of Fame Open, United States	Grass	(United States) Ivana Corley	(Netherlands) Arianne Hartono (India) Prarthana Thombare	7–6^{(4)}, 6–3
Win	3–0	Jul 2025	Porto Open, Portugal	Hard	(United States) Ivana Corley	(Chinese Taipei) Liang En-shuo (Thailand) Peangtarn Plipuech	6–3, 6–1
Loss	3–1	Nov 2025	Austin Challenger, United States	Hard	(United States) Ivana Corley	(Belarus) Iryna Shymanovich (Russia) Maria Kozyreva	3–6, 6–7^{(4–7)}
Win	4–1	Feb 2026	Oeiras Indoors, Portugal	Hard	(United States) Ivana Corley	(United Kingdom) Emily Appleton (Japan) Makoto Ninomiya	2–6, 6–0, [10–4]
Loss	4–2	Feb 2026	Oeiras Indoors 2, Portugal	Hard (i)	(United States) Ivana Corley	(Slovakia) Viktória Hrunčáková (Czech Republic) Gabriela Knutson	6–7^{(7–9)}, 3–6

== ITF Circuit finals ==
=== Doubles: 15 (8 titles, 7 runner-ups) ===
Legend
W100 tournaments
W60/75 tournaments
W50 tournaments
W35 tournaments
W15 tournaments

Result	W–L	Date	Tournament	Tier	Surface	Partner	Opponents	Score
Loss	0–1	Dec 2019	ITF Norman, United States	W15	Hard	(United States) Ivana Corley	(Australia) Lisa Mays (United Kingdom) Nell Miller	6–7^{(5)}, 6–4, [8–10]
Loss	0–2	Sep 2021	ITF Lubbock, United States	W15	Hard	(United States) Ivana Corley	(France) Tiphanie Fiquet (Chile) Fernanda Labraña	4–6, 7–6^{(2)}, [8–10]
Win	1–2	Jun 2022	ITF Colorado Springs, United States	W15	Hard	(United States) Ivana Corley	(Poland) Daria Kuczer; Veronika Miroshnichenko	7–6^{(4)}, 6–2
Win	2–2	Oct 2022	Las Vegas Open, United States	W60	Hard	(United States) Ivana Corley	(Serbia) Katarina Kozarov; Veronika Miroshnichenko	6–2, 6–0
Loss	2–3	Jul 2023	Championnats de Granby, Canada	W100	Clay	(United States) Ivana Corley	(Mexico) Marcela Zacarías (Mexico) Renata Zarazúa	3–6, 3–6
Win	3–3	Oct 2023	Toronto Challenger, Canada	W60	Hard (i)	(United States) Ivana Corley	(Canada) Kayla Cross (United States) Liv Hovde	6–7^{(6)}, 6–3, [10–3]
Win	4–3	Mar 2024	ITF Santo Domingo, Dominican Republic	W35	Hard	(United States) Ivana Corley	(Spain) Leyre Romero Gormaz (Italy) Camilla Rosatello	6–3, 6–7^{(3)}, [10–5]
Win	5–3	Mar 2024	ITF Santo Domingo, Dominican Republic	W35	Hard	(United States) Ivana Corley	(Bulgaria) Lia Karatancheva (United States) Rasheeda McAdoo	6–1, 6–7^{(5)}, [12–10]
Loss	5–4	Apr 2024	Bellinzona Ladies Open, Switzerland	W75	Clay	(United States) Ivana Corley	(Czech Republic) Jesika Malečková (Switzerland) Conny Perrin	7–6^{(4)}, 6–7^{(7)}, [7–10]
Loss	5–5	Jul 2024	Lexington Challenger, United States	W75	Hard	(United States) Ivana Corley	(United States) Whitney Osuigwe (United States) Alana Smith	6–7^{(5)}, 3–6
Loss	5–6	Oct 2024	Templeton Open, United States	W75	Hard	(Canada) Rebecca Marino	(United States) Sophie Chang (United States) Rasheeda McAdoo	6–1, 2–6, [4–10]
Win	6–6	Jan 2025	Vero Beach Open, United States	W75	Clay	(Netherlands) Eva Vedder	(France) Julie Belgraver (Netherlands) Jasmijn Gimbrère	6–2, 6–3
Loss	6–7	Mar 2025	ITF Santo Domingo, Dominican Republic	W50	Hard	(United States) Maribella Zamarripa	(United Kingdom) Holly Hutchinson (United Kingdom) Ella McDonald	1–6, 4–6
Win	7–7	Aug 2025	Landisville Tennis Challenge, United States	W100	Hard	(United States) Ivana Corley	(Brazil) Ingrid Martins (Switzerland) Simona Waltert	4–6, 7–6^{(4)}, [12–10]
Win	8–7	Jan 2026	ITF Bradenton, United States	W35	Hard	(United States) Ivana Corley	(United States) Jaeda Daniel (United States) Dalayna Hewitt	4–6, 6–3, [10–5]
