= Iryna Shymanovich =

Belarusian tennis player (born 1997)

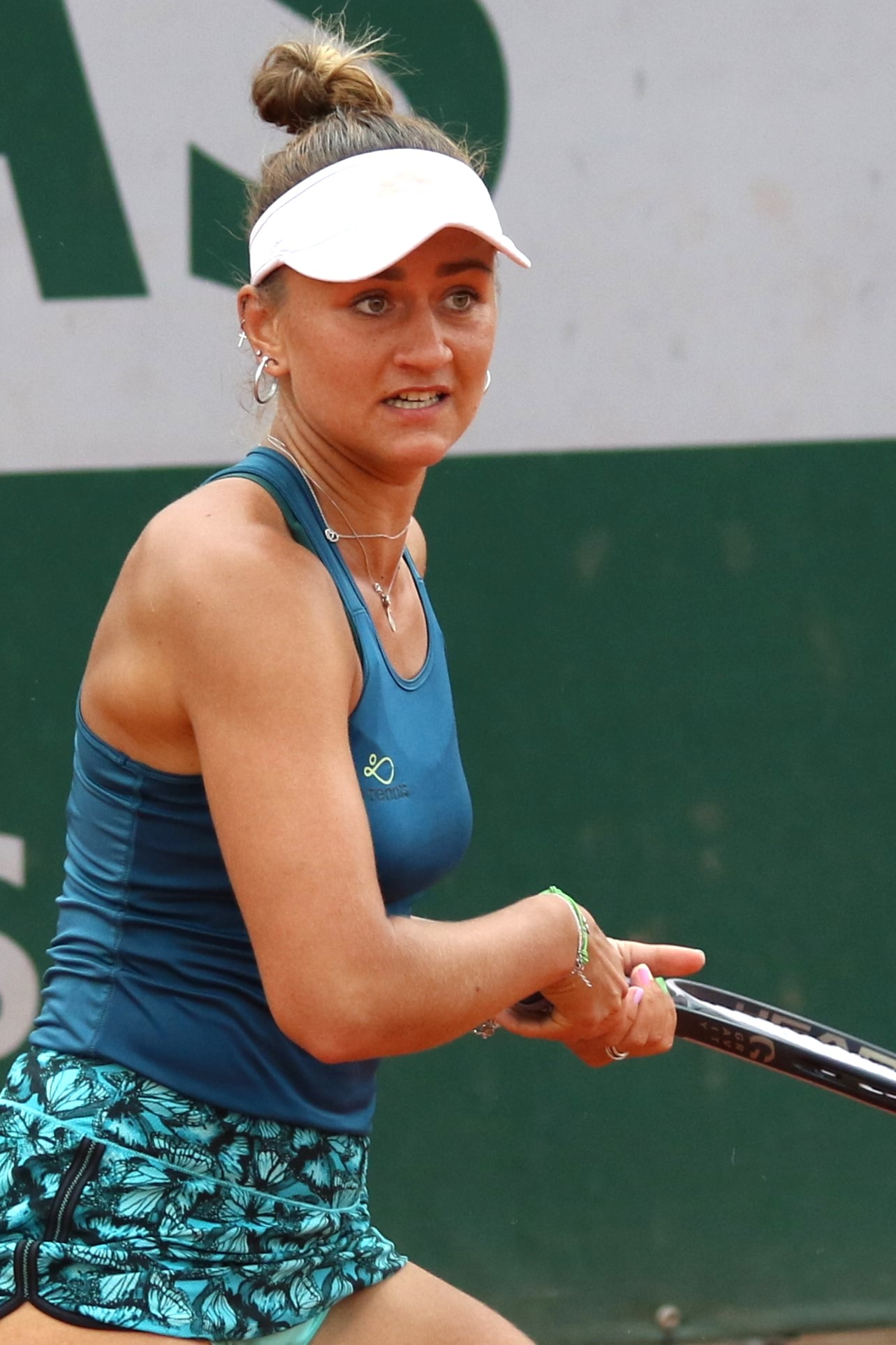
- Shymanovich at the 2023 French Open
- Full name: Iryna Uladzimiraŭna Shymanovich
- Native name: Ірына Ўладзіміраўна Шымановіч
- Country (sports): Belarus
- Born: 30 June 1997 (age 29) Minsk, Belarus
- Height: 1.71 m (5 ft 7 in)
- Prize money: $1,058,537

Singles
- Career record: 317–172
- Career titles: 0 WTA, 14 ITF
- Highest ranking: No. 150 (5 January 2026)
- Current ranking: No. 193 (10 August 2026)

Grand Slam singles results
- Australian Open: Q2 (2026)
- French Open: 2R (2023)
- Wimbledon: 1R (2026)
- US Open: Q2 (2023, 2024, 2025, 2026)

Doubles
- Career record: 232–117
- Career titles: 1 WTA, 11 WTA Challenger
- Highest ranking: No. 63 (20 April 2026)
- Current ranking: No. 73 (10 August 2026)

Grand Slam doubles results
- Australian Open: 2R (2024)
- French Open: 2R (2023)
- Wimbledon: QF (2023)
- US Open: 1R (2023, 2026)

Team competitions
- Fed Cup: 2–2
Medal record
Representing a mixed-NOCs team
Youth Olympic Games
Gold medal – first place	2014 Nanjing	Girls' doubles
Representing Belarus
Youth Olympic Games
Silver medal – second place	2014 Nanjing	Girls' singles
- Last updated on: 21 August 2026.

Iryna Uladzimiraŭna Shymanovich (Belarusian: Ірына Ўладзіміраўна Шымановіч; Russian: Ирина Владимировна Шиманович, romanized: Irina Vladimirovna Shimanovich; born 30 June 1997) is a Belarusian tennis player. On 20 April 2026, she peaked at No. 63 in the WTA doubles rankings. On 5 January 2026, she reached her career-high singles ranking of world No. 150.

Shymanovich has won one doubles title on the WTA Tour and eleven doubles titles on the WTA Challenger Tour. She has also won 14 singles and 17 doubles titles on the ITF Women's Circuit.

== Junior years ==
=== Grand Slam performance ===
Singles:

- Australian Open: –
- French Open: QF (2014)
- Wimbledon: 1R (2013, 2014)
- US Open: QF (2013, 2014, 2015)

Doubles:

- Australian Open: –
- French Open: QF (2013, 2014)
- Wimbledon: F (2013)
- US Open: QF (2013, 2015)

At the 2013 Wimbledon Championships, she finished runner-up in girls' doubles with Anhelina Kalinina.

== Fed Cup ==
On 4 February 2014, she made her debut for the Belarus Fed Cup team, winning her first international rubber with Ilona Kremen in doubles against the team of Turkey.

== Professional ==
=== 2022–2023: WTA Tour singles & major debuts, maiden title, top 100 in doubles ===
Shymanovich made her WTA Tour main-draw debut as a lucky loser at the Cleveland Open, losing to Liudmila Samsonova in the first round.

At the Copa Colsanitas, Shymanovich reached her first WTA Tour doubles final and won the match alongside Irina Khromacheva. She made her top 100 debut in the doubles rankings on 10 April, at world No. 94.

She qualified into the main draw for her major debut at the 2023 French Open and won her first match defeating Panna Udvardy, before losing to second seed Aryna Sabalenka in the second round. At the same tournament, she also made her major debut in doubles, with Brazilian Ingrid Martins as alternate pair, and recorded her first win over Irina-Camelia Begu and Anhelina Kalinina.

On her debut in doubles at the Wimbledon, she reached the quarterfinals with Oksana Kalashnikova where they lost to 16th seeds Zhang Shuai and Caroline Dolehide in straight sets.

=== 2024: Three WTA 125 doubles titles ===
Playing with Renata Zarazúa, Shymanovich the doubles title at the WTA 125 Puerto Vallarta Open in February, defeating Angelica Moratelli and Camilla Rosatello in the final.

In June, partnering Sabrina Santamaria, she won the WTA 125 Makarska International Championships doubles draw, overcoming Nao Hibino and Oksana Kalashnikova in a deciding champions tiebreak in the final.

The following month, Shymanovich teamed up with Oksana Kalashnikova to claim the doubles title at the WTA 125 Contrexéville Open in France, with a win over Wu Fang-hsien and Zhang Shuai in another final which was decided in a champions tiebreak.

=== 2025-2026: Eight WTA 125 doubles titles ===
Shymanovich qualified for the singles main draw at the WTA 500 2025 Charleston Open and defeated wildcard entrant Heather Watson before losing to top seed and eventual champion, Jessica Pegula.

Partnering with Maria Kozyreva, she won seven WTA 125 doubles titles between June 2025 and March 2026, claiming the trophies at Bari, Valencia, Guadalajara, Austin, Canberra, Antalya 1 and Antalya 3.

Teaming up with Katie Volynets, Shymanovich won the doubles title at the WTA 125 2026 Hall of Fame Open, overcoming Savannah Broadus and Kylie Collins in the championship match.

== Performance timelines ==
Key
W	F	SF	QF	#R	RR	Q#	P#	DNQ	A	Z#	PO	G	S	B	NMS	NTI	P	NH

(W) winner; (F) finalist; (SF) semifinalist; (QF) quarterfinalist; (#R) rounds 4, 3, 2, 1; (RR) round-robin stage; (Q#) qualification round; (P#) preliminary round; (DNQ) did not qualify; (A) absent; (Z#) Davis/Fed Cup Zonal Group (with number indication) or (PO) play-off; (G) gold, (S) silver or (B) bronze Olympic/Paralympic medal; (NMS) not a Masters tournament; (NTI) not a Tier I tournament; (P) postponed; (NH) not held; (SR) strike rate (events won / competed); (W–L) win–loss record.
To avoid confusion and double counting, these charts are updated at the conclusion of a tournament or when the player's participation has ended.

Only main-draw results in WTA Tour, Grand Slam tournaments, Billie Jean King Cup, United Cup, Hopman Cup and Olympic Games are included in win–loss records.

=== Singles ===
Current through the 2023 Tunis Open.

Tournament	2014	...	2021	2022	2023	SR	W–L
Grand Slam tournaments
Australian Open	A		A	A	A	0 / 0	0–0
French Open	A		A	A	2R	0 / 1	1–1
Wimbledon	A		A	A	Q1	0 / 0	0–0
US Open	A		A	A	Q2	0 / 0	0–0
Win–loss	0–0		0–0	0–0	1–1	0 / 1	1–1
National representation
Billie Jean King Cup (Note: Formerly known as Fed Cup until 2020.)	Z1		RR	DQ (Note: Suspended due to the ban of Russian and Belarusian athletes in light of the Russian invasion of Ukraine.)		0 / 1	0–1
WTA 1000
Guadalajara Open	NH			A	1R	0 / 1	0–1
Career statistics
Tournaments	0		0 (Note: During the season, she did not play in the main draw of any tour-level tournaments. However, she played at the Billie Jean King Cup, which is not counted as a played tournament but matches counted.)	1	3	Career total: 4	
Titles	0		0	0	0	Career total: 0	
Finals	0		0	0	0	Career total: 0	
Overall win–loss	0–0		0–1	0–1	2–3	0 / 4	2–5
Year-end ranking (Note: 2013: WTA ranking–919, ... 2015: WTA ranking–534, 2016: WTA ranking–528, 2017: WTA ranking–578, 2018: WTA ranking–493, 2019: WTA ranking–420, 2020: WTA ranking–419.)	384		263	330	164	$398,301	

=== Doubles ===
Current through the 2023 Guadalajara Open.

Tournament	2014	...	2021	2022	2023	2024	2025	2026	SR	W–L
Grand Slam tournaments
Australian Open	A		A	A	A	2R	A	1R	0 / 2	1–2
French Open	A		A	A	2R	A	A	1R	0 / 2	1–2
Wimbledon	A		A	A	QF	A	2R	1R	0 / 3	4–3
US Open	A		A	A	1R	A	A		0 / 1	0–1
Win–loss	0–0		0–0	0–0	4–3	1–1	1–1	0–3	0 / 8	6–8
National representation
Billie Jean King Cup	Z1		RR	DQ		A	A		0 / 1	2–1
WTA 1000 tournaments
Guadalajara Open	NH			A	1R	A	A		0 / 1	0–1
Career statistics
Tournaments	0		0	0	7				Career total: 7	
Titles	0		0	0	1				Career total: 1	
Finals	0		0	0	1				Career total: 1	
Overall win–loss	2–1		0–0	0–0	8–6				1 / 7	10–7
Year-end ranking (Note: 2013: WTA ranking–845, ... 2015: WTA ranking–468, 2016: WTA ranking–548, 2017: WTA ranking–626, 2018: WTA ranking–504, 2019: WTA ranking–358, 2020: WTA ranking–459.)	949		306	384	68	100	77			

== WTA Tour finals ==
=== Doubles: 1 (title) ===
Legend
WTA 250 (1–0)

Result	W–L	Date	Tournament	Tier	Surface	Partner	Opponents	Score
Win	1–0	Apr 2023	Copa Colsanitas, Colombia	WTA 250	Clay	Irina Khromacheva	(Georgia (country)) Oksana Kalashnikova (Poland) Katarzyna Piter	6–1, 3–6, [10–6]

== WTA 125 finals ==
=== Doubles: 11 (11 titles) ===
Result	W–L	Date	Tournament	Surface	Partner	Opponents	Score
Win	1–0	Feb 2024	Puerto Vallarta Open, Mexico	Hard	(Mexico) Renata Zarazúa	(Italy) Angelica Moratelli (Italy) Camilla Rosatello	6–2, 7–6^{(7–1)}
Win	2–0	Jun 2024	Makarska International, Croatia	Clay	(United States) Sabrina Santamaria	(Japan) Nao Hibino (Georgia (country)) Oksana Kalashnikova	6–4, 3–6, [10–6]
Win	3–0	Jul 2024	Contrexéville Open, France	Clay	(Georgia (country)) Oksana Kalashnikova	(Chinese Taipei) Wu Fang-hsien (China) Zhang Shuai	5–7, 6–3, [10–7]
Win	4–0	Jun 2025	Bari Open, Italy	Clay	Maria Kozyreva	(Brazil) Ingrid Martins (United States) Quinn Gleason	3–6, 6–4, [10–7]
Win	5–0	Jun 2025	Internacional de Valencia, Spain	Clay	Maria Kozyreva	(Spain) Yvonne Cavallé Reimers (Spain) Ángela Fita Boluda	6–3, 6–4
Win	6–0	Sep 2025	Guadalajara 125 Open, Mexico	Hard	Maria Kozyreva	Irina Khromacheva; Kamilla Rakhimova	6–3, 6–4
Win	7–0	Nov 2025	Austin Challenger, United States	Hard	Maria Kozyreva	(United States) Carmen Corley (United States) Ivana Corley	6–3, 7–6^{(7–4)}
Win	8–0	Jan 2026	Canberra International, Australia	Hard	(Russia) Maria Kozyreva	(Japan) Ena Shibahara; Vera Zvonareva	6–7^{(9–11)}, 7–5, [10–8]
Win	9–0	Mar 2026	Antalya Challenger, Turkey	Clay	Maria Kozyreva	(Japan) Momoko Kobori (Thailand) Peangtarn Plipuech	7–5, 6–1
Win	10–0	Mar 2026	Antalya Challenger 3, Turkey	Clay	Maria Kozyreva	(Poland) Maja Chwalińska (Czech Republic) Jesika Malečková	7–6^{(9–7)}, 6–4
Win	11-0	Jul 2026	Hall of Fame Open, United States	Grass	(United States) Katie Volynets	(United States) Savannah Broadus (United States) Kylie Collins	6–2, 7–6^{(8–6)}

== ITF Circuit finals ==
=== Singles: 20 (14 titles, 6 runner-ups) ===
Legend W60 tournaments (1–0) W50 tournaments (1–1) W25 tournaments (2–3) W10/15 tournaments (10–2)	Finals by surface Hard (4–2) Clay (9–4) Carpet (1–0)

Result	W–L	Date	Tournament	Tier	Surface	Opponent	Score
Win	1–0	Dec 2013	ITF Sharm El Sheikh, Egypt	10,000	Hard	(United Kingdom) Emily Webley-Smith	6–4, 6–3
Loss	1–1	Dec 2013	ITF Sharm El Sheikh, Egypt	10,000	Hard	(Romania) Elena-Teodora Cadar	4–6, 6–4, 3–6
Win	2–1	Feb 2014	AK Ladies Open, Germany	15,000	Carpet (i)	(Hungary) Réka Luca Jani	6–1, 7–6^{(3)}
Loss	2–2	Mar 2014	ITF Antalya, Turkey	10,000	Clay	(China) Zhu Lin	1–6, 4–6
Win	3–2	Mar 2014	ITF Antalya, Turkey	10,000	Clay	(Germany) Lisa Ponomar	6–2, 6–3
Loss	3–3	Jun 2015	ITF Minsk, Belarus	25,000	Clay	(Russia) Daria Kasatkina	1–6, 1–6
Win	4–3	Apr 2016	ITF Antalya, Turkey	10,000	Hard	(United States) Tina Tehrani	6–3, 6–2
Win	5–3	Apr 2016	ITF Antalya, Turkey	10,000	Hard	(Germany) Dana Kremer	6–0, 6–1
Win	6–3	Jun 2017	ITF Minsk, Belarus	15,000	Clay	(Belarus) Ilona Kremen	6–1, 4–6, 6–2
Win	7–3	Aug 2017	ITF Moscow, Russia	15,000	Clay	(Russia) Polina Leykina	6–2, 6–4
Win	8–3	Aug 2017	ITF Moscow, Russia	15,000	Clay	(Russia) Yana Sizikova	6–1, 5–7, 7–5
Win	9–3	Apr 2018	ITF Sharm El Sheikh, Egypt	15,000	Clay	(United States) Dasha Ivanova	6–2, 6–1
Loss	9–4	Jun 2018	ITF Namangan, Uzbekistan	25,000	Hard	(Uzbekistan) Sabina Sharipova	1–6, 1–6
Win	10–4	Nov 2020	ITF Sharm El Sheikh, Egypt	W15	Hard	(United States) Jessie Aney	6–3, 7–5
Win	11–4	Aug 2021	ITF Almaty, Kazakhstan	W25	Clay	(Belarus) Vera Lapko	6–3, 6–2
Win	12–4	Oct 2022	ITF Otočec, Slovenia	W25	Clay	(Romania) Miriam Bulgaru	6–3, 3–6, 6–3
Win	13–4	Dec 2022	ITF Rio de Janeiro, Brazil	W60	Clay	(Russia) Irina Khromacheva	6–2, 5–7, 6–4
Loss	13–5	Mar 2023	ITF Palma Nova, Spain	W25	Clay	(Romania) Jaqueline Cristian	4–6, 0–6
Loss	13–6	Mar 2025	Vacaria Open, Brazil	W50	Clay	(Italy) Aurora Zantedeschi	6–4, 5–7, 5–7
Win	14–6	Apr 2025	Florida's Sports Coast Open, US	W50	Clay	(United States) Caty McNally	7–6^{(2)}, 6–0

=== Doubles: 35 (17 titles, 18 runner-ups) ===
Legend W100 tournaments (2–1) W80 tournaments (0–1) W60/75 tournaments (1–3) W40/50 tournaments (3–1) W25 tournaments (6–8) W10/15 tournaments (5–4)	Finals by surface Hard (9–8) Clay (8–10)

Result	W–L	Date	Tournament	Tier	Surface	Partner	Opponents	Score
Loss	0–1	Oct 2013	ITF Antalya, Turkey	10,000	Clay	(Russia) Aleksandra Zenovka	(Ukraine) Olena Kyrpot (Russia) Julia Samuseva	6–4, 3–6, [3–10]
Loss	0–2	Mar 2015	ITF Antalya, Turkey	10,000	Clay	(Russia) Polina Novoselova	(Turkey) Melis Sezer (Slovakia) Lenka Wienerová	2–6, 2–6
Win	1–2	Jun 2015	ITF Stuttgart, Germany	25,000	Clay	(Russia) Maria Marfutina	(Czech Republic) Lenka Kunčíková (Czech Republic) Karolína Stuchlá	6–2, 4–6, [10–8]
Win	2–2	Apr 2016	ITF Antalya, Turkey	10,000	Hard	(United Kingdom) Jazzamay Drew	(Germany) Tayisiya Morderger (Germany) Yana Morderger	3–6, 6–1, [10–2]
Loss	3–4	Jun 2016	ITF Minsk, Belarus	25,000	Clay	(Belarus) Ilona Kremen	(Norway) Ulrikke Eikeri (Brazil) Laura Pigossi	2–6, 4–6
Loss	2–4	Jul 2017	ITF Moscow, Russia	25,000	Clay	(Belarus) Ilona Kremen	(Uzbekistan) Akgul Amanmuradova (Russia) Valentyna Ivakhnenko	4–6, 2–6
Win	3–4	Aug 2017	ITF Moscow, Russia	15,000	Clay	(Belarus) Ilona Kremen	(Russia) Elina Avanesyan (Russia) Avelina Sayfetdinova	6–4, 6–4
Win	4–4	Aug 2017	ITF Moscow, Russia	15,000	Clay	(Belarus) Ilona Kremen	(Russia) Aleksandra Kuznetsova (Russia) Sofya Lansere	6–2, 6–0
Loss	4–5	Mar 2018	ITF Sharm El Sheikh, Egypt	15,000	Hard	(Belarus) Yuliya Hatouka	(Denmark) Emilie Francati (Belgium) Britt Geukens	0–6, 3–6
Win	5–5	Apr 2018	ITF Sharm El Sheikh, Egypt	15,000	Hard	(Bulgaria) Julia Terziyska	(Chinese Taipei) Chen Pei-hsuan (Chinese Taipei) Wu Fang-hsien	6–3, 7–5
Win	6–5	Jun 2018	ITF Andijan, Uzbekistan	25,000	Hard	(Belarus) Ilona Kremen	(Russia) Anastasia Gasanova (Russia) Ekaterina Yashina	6–4, 6–4
Win	7–5	Nov 2018	ITF Minsk, Belarus	25,000	Hard	(Belarus) Ilona Kremen	(Russia) Polina Monova (Russia) Yana Sizikova	6–3, 7–6
Loss	7–6	Apr 2019	Lale Cup Istanbul, Turkey	W60	Hard	(Belarus) Ilona Kremen	(Czech Republic) Marie Bouzková (Netherlands) Rosalie van der Hoek	5–7, 7–6^{(2)}, [5–10]
Loss	7–7	Jun 2019	ITF Minsk, Belarus	W25	Clay	(Belarus) Ilona Kremen	(North Macedonia) Lina Gjorcheska (Russia) Anastasiya Komardina	7–6, 4–6, [8–10]
Win	8–7	Nov 2020	ITF Sharm El Sheikh, Egypt	W15	Hard	(Russia) Elina Avanesyan	(Switzerland) Valentina Ryser (Switzerland) Lulu Sun	6–4, 6–1
Loss	8–8	Nov 2020	ITF Sharm El Sheikh, Egypt	W15	Hard	(Russia) Elina Avanesyan	(Czech Republic) Michaela Bayerlová (Czech Republic) Laetitia Pulchartova	4–6, 5–7
Loss	8–9	Jun 2021	Tatarstan Open, Russia	W25	Hard	(Belarus) Shalimar Talbi	(Uzbekistan) Nigina Abduraimova (Russia) Angelina Gabueva	2–6, 6–7^{(5)}
Win	9–9	Aug 2021	ITF Bydgoszcz, Poland	W25	Clay	(Brazil) Carolina Alves	(Japan) Hiroko Kuwata (Colombia) Yuliana Lizarazo	6–1, 3–6, [10–5]
Loss	9–10	Aug 2021	ITF Radom, Poland	W25	Clay	(Brazil) Carolina Alves	(Japan) Mana Kawamura (Japan) Funa Kozaki	4–6, 2–6
Win	10–10	Sep 2022	ITF Otočec, Slovenia	W25	Clay	Irina Khromacheva	(Egypt) Sandra Samir (Chinese Taipei) Yang Ya-yi	6–2, 6–4
Loss	10–11	Oct 2022	ITF Otočec 2, Slovenia	W25	Clay	Irina Khromacheva	(United States) Jessie Aney (Czech Republic) Anna Sisková	0–3 ret.
Loss	10–12	Nov 2022	Open de Valencia, Spain	W80+H	Clay	Irina Khromacheva	(Switzerland) Ylena In-Albon (Spain) Cristina Bucșa	3–6, 2–6
Win	11–12	Jan 2023	ITF Monastir, Tunisia	W25	Hard	Kristina Dmitruk	(Germany) Kathleen Kanev (Switzerland) Arlinda Rushiti	6–1, 6–2
Win	12–12	Jan 2023	ITF Monastir, Tunisia	W40	Hard	Alena Fomina-Klotz	(Romania) Oana Gavrila (Greece) Sapfo Sakellaridi	6–2, 6–1
Loss	12–13	Jan 2023	ITF Monastir, Tunisia	W40	Hard	Alena Fomina-Klotz	(Burundi) Sada Nahimana (Romania) Andreea Prisăcariu	5–7, 4–6
Loss	12–14	Jan 2023	Open Andrézieux-Bouthéon, France	W60	Hard (i)	(Switzerland) Conny Perrin	Oksana Selekhmeteva; Sofya Lansere	3–6, 0–6
Win	13–14	Mar 2023	ITF Astana, Kazakhstan	W40	Hard (i)	(Kazakhstan) Anna Danilina	(South Korea) Han Na-lae (South Korea) Jang Su-jeong	6–4, 6–7^{(8)}, [10–7]
Loss	13–15	Mar 2023	ITF Palmanova, Spain	W25	Clay	(Georgia (country)) Ekaterine Gorgodze	(Portugal) Francisca Jorge (Portugal) Matilde Jorge	1–6, 6–3, [8–10]
Loss	13–16	Mar 2023	ITF Palmanova, Spain	W25	Clay	(Georgia (country)) Ekaterine Gorgodze	(Portugal) Francisca Jorge (Portugal) Matilde Jorge	6–4, 3–6, [8–10]
Win	14–16	Jul 2024	Open de Montpellier, France	W75	Clay	(Croatia) Mariana Dražić	Elena Pridankina; Ekaterina Yashina	1–6, 6–4, [10–8]
Loss	14–17	Aug 2024	Cary Tennis Classic, United States	W100	Hard	(Georgia (country)) Oksana Kalashnikova	(Switzerland) Céline Naef (Slovenia) Tamara Zidanšek	6–4, 3–6, [9–11]
Loss	14–18	Jan 2025	Pune Open, India	W75	Hard	Maria Kozyreva	Alevtina Ibragimova; Elena Pridankina	2–6, 6–1, [8–10]
Win	15–18	Apr 2025	Florida's Sports Coast Open, US	W50	Clay	Maria Kozyreva	(United States) Maria Mateas (United States) Alana Smith	6–4, 6–1
Win	16–18	Apr 2025	Charlottesville Open, US	W100	Hard	Maria Kozyreva	(Canada) Kayla Cross (Australia) Petra Hule	7–5, 7–5
Win	17–18	Apr 2025	Bonita Springs Championship, US	W100	Hard	Maria Kozyreva	(United States) Makenna Jones (United States) Angela Kulikov	6–2, 6–2

== Fed Cup/Billie Jean King Cup participation ==
=== Doubles (2–1) ===
Edition	Stage	Date	Location	Against	Surface	Partner	Opponents	W/L	Score
2014	Z1 R/R	Feb 2014	Budapest (HUN)	Turkey	Hard (i)	Ilona Kremen	Çağla Büyükakçay; Pemra Özgen	W	7–5, 6–1
2014	Z1 R/R	Feb 2014	Budapest (HUN)	Portugal	Hard (i)	Ilona Kremen	Michelle Larcher de Brito; Bárbara Luz	W	6–1, 6–0
2014	Z1 R/R	Feb 2014	Budapest (HUN)	Bulgaria	Hard (i)	Ilona Kremen	Elitsa Kostova; Viktoriya Tomova	L	6–4, 3–6, 5–7

== Junior Grand Slam tournament finals ==
=== Girls' doubles: 1 (runner-up) ===
Result	Year	Tournament	Surface	Partner	Opponents	Score
Loss	2013	Wimbledon	Grass	(Ukraine) Anhelina Kalinina	(Czech Republic) Barbora Krejčíková (Czech Republic) Kateřina Siniaková	3–6, 1–6
