= Renata Zarazúa =

Mexican tennis player (born 1997)

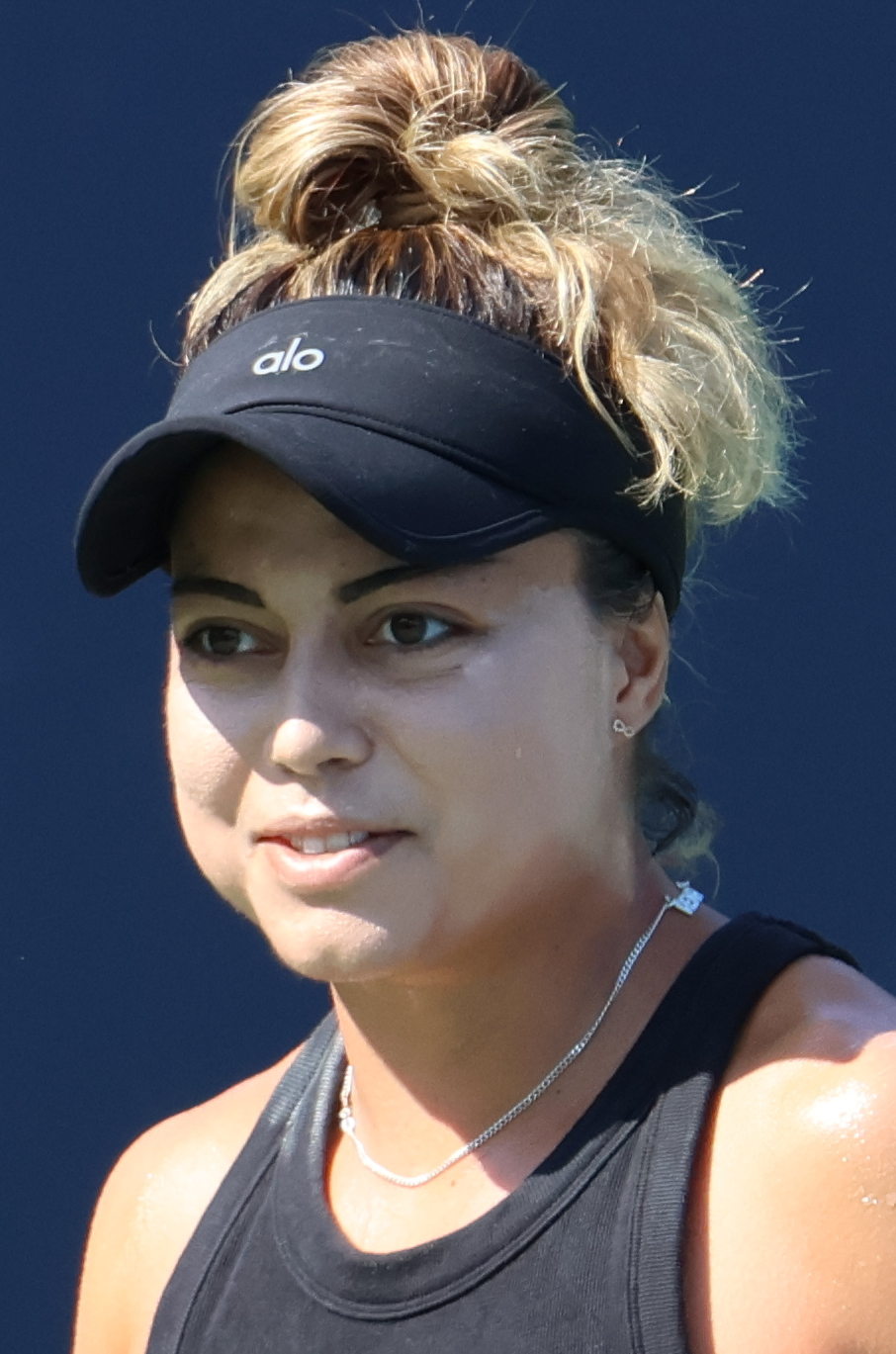
- Zarazúa at the 2024 Washington Open
- Full name: Renata Zarazúa Ruckstuhl
- Country (sports): Mexico
- Residence: Tampa, Florida, US
- Born: 30 September 1997 (age 29) Mexico City, Mexico
- Height: 1.60 m (5 ft 3 in)
- Turned pro: 2012
- Coach: Patricio Zarazúa Ruckstuhl
- Prize money: $2,901,865

Singles
- Career record: 433–323
- Career titles: 3 WTA 125
- Highest ranking: No. 51 (25 November 2024)
- Current ranking: No. 97 (2 November 2026)

Grand Slam singles results
- Australian Open: 2R (2025)
- French Open: 2R (2020)
- Wimbledon: 2R (2025)
- US Open: 2R (2024, 2025)

Other tournaments
- Olympic Games: 1R (2021)

Doubles
- Career record: 221–198
- Career titles: 1 WTA 125
- Highest ranking: No. 72 (15 September 2025)
- Current ranking: No. 191 (2 November 2026)

Grand Slam doubles results
- Australian Open: QF (2025)
- French Open: 2R (2025)
- Wimbledon: 1R (2025, 2026)
- US Open: 2R (2025)

Other doubles tournaments
- Olympic Games: 1R (2021)

Team competitions
- Fed Cup: 19–14
Medal record
Women's tennis
Representing MEX
Central American and Caribbean Games
| Gold medal – first place | 2014 Veracruz | Team event |
- Last updated on: 2 November 2026.

Renata Zarazúa Ruckstuhl (Latin American Spanish: [reˈnata saɾaˈsu.a]; born 30 September 1997) is a Mexican professional tennis player. She reached a best singles ranking of world No. 51 on 25 November 2024, and peaked at No. 72 in the doubles rankings on 15 September 2025, the first Mexican woman to break in the top 100 in singles and in doubles.

Zarazúa has won three singles titles and one doubles title on the WTA Challenger Tour. On the ITF Circuit, she has won six titles in singles and 17 in doubles.

In 2020, Zarazúa qualified for the main draw of the French Open, becoming the first Mexican female tennis player to compete in the main draw of a major in 20 years. On the WTA Tour, her biggest result to date was reaching the semifinals of the 2020 Mexican Open.

Playing for Mexico, Zarazúa has a win–loss record of 18–14 in BJK Cup competition (as of May 2026).

== Early life and background ==
Zarazúa was born on 30 September 1997 to Jose Luis and Alejandra in Mexico City. She also has an older brother named Patricio, who is a former college tennis player for Palm Beach Atlantic University. Her great-uncle Vicente Zarazúa, a Mexican pro tennis player, participated in 16 Davis Cup ties for Mexico and claimed gold medals in exhibition doubles at the 1968 Olympic Games in Mexico City. During an interview at the 2020 French Open, Zarazúa stated that Simona Halep is the player she admires the most.

== Career ==
=== 2016-2019: WTA Tour debut ===
Zarazúa made her WTA Tour singles debut at the 2016 Brasil Cup, after she reached the main draw through qualifying, but to lost in the first round Catalina Pella in three sets.

Having been given a wildcard entry at the 2018 Mexican Open, Zarazúa defeated Kristýna Plíšková to reach the round of 16, where she lost to third seed Daria Gavrilova.

=== 2020: Major debut, WTA Tour semifinal ===
In February, Zarazúa received a wildcard to play at the Mexican Open in Acapulco, where she reached her first WTA Tour singles semifinal with wins over top seed Sloane Stephens, Katie Volynets and Tamara Zidanšek, before losing to Leylah Fernandez. Her run at the tournament saw her become the first Mexican woman to play a WTA Tour semifinal since 1993.

In September, Zarazúa qualified for the main draw at the delayed French Open, making her first appearance at a Grand Slam tournament and becoming the first Mexican woman in a major main draw in 20 years. She defeated wildcard Elsa Jacquemot recording her first major match win, and becoming the first Mexican woman to do so since Angélica Gavaldón reached the second round of the 2000 Australian Open. Zarazúa lost in round two to third seed Elina Svitolina in three sets under the newly installed roof on Court Philippe Chatrier.

=== 2021-2023: Olympics debut, WTA 125 title ===
In 2021, Zarazúa qualified for the delayed Tokyo Olympics in singles and in doubles, partnering Giuliana Olmos both making their Olympics debut.

Zarazúa entered her maiden WTA 125 final at the 2021 Concord Open losing to Magdalena Fręch.

Zarazúa won her first WTA 125 title at the 2023 Montevideo Open defeating the top seed, Diane Parry, in the final, becoming the first Mexican woman to win a WTA Challenger Tour singles tournament.

=== 2024: Top 100 debut, second WTA 125 title ===
Zarazúa reached the top 100 on 8 January, and became the second Mexican player, after Angélica Gavaldón in 1996, to reach the milestone. The following week, she qualified for the Australian Open making her debut and becoming the second Mexican woman to reach the main draw at the tournament in the Open Era, and the first since two-time quarterfinalist Angelica Gavaldon's final appearance in 2000. Zarazúa lost in the first round to Martina Trevisan, in three sets. In February, playing with Iryna Shymanovich, she won her first WTA 125 doubles title on home soil at the Puerto Vallarta Open, defeating Angelica Moratelli and Camilla Rosatello in the final.

Zarazúa qualified for the Italian Open, making her debut at a clay WTA 1000 event, but lost to Elisabetta Cocciaretto in the first round. Wins over seventh seed Viktorija Golubic, wildcard entrant Ajla Tomljanović and Peyton Stearns saw Zarazúa reach the semifinals at the WTA 125 Parma Open in May, where she went out to eighth seed Mayar Sherif. She could not continue her good form into that month's French Open, losing in the first round to 14th seed Madison Keys in straight sets. Partnering Angelica Moratelli, she ended runner-up in the doubles at the WTA 125 Bari Open, losing the final against top seeds Anna Danilina and Irina Khromacheva. The following week, Zarazúa and Moratelli reached the final at the WTA 125 Valencia Open, but again suffered defeat, this time to second seeds Katarzyna Piter and Fanny Stollár in a match which went to a deciding champions tiebreak.

At Wimbledon, Zarazúa was eliminated in the final qualifying round but made the main draw for the first time in her career at this major as a lucky loser. She was defeated by Emma Raducanu in straight sets in a first round match.

Zarazúa also made her debut at the US Open as a direct entry benefitting from the withdrawal of Sorana Cîrstea, and recorded her first win at this Grand Slam tournament with an upset over 28th seed Caroline Garcia, before losing her next match to Caroline Wozniacki

At the WTA 500 Guadalajara Open, Zarazúa defeated Anhelina Kalinina to reach the second round, where she lost to Martina Trevisan. Zarazúa moved to a new career-high of world No. 78 in the singles rankings on 16 September 2024. She then won two ITF events, the Central Coast Pro Tennis Open, defeating Usue Maitane Arconada in the final in straight sets, and the Tyler Pro Challenge with a win over Iva Jovic in the final. As the top seed at her home tournament, the Mérida Open, she made the quarterfinals defeating wildcard Akasha Urhobo and qualifier Maja Chwalińska, before losing to eventual champion, Zeynep Sönmez. As a result, she reached a new career-high in the top 60 of the singles rankings.

As the top seed at the Fifth Third Charleston in November, Zarazúa won her second WTA 125 singles title defeating Alina Charaeva, Irene Burillo, Louisa Chirico, and Lauren Davis to reach the final, where she overcame Hanna Chang in straight sets. As a result, she reached a new career-high singles ranking of world No. 51 on 25 November 2024.

=== 2025: Historic top-10 win at the US Open ===
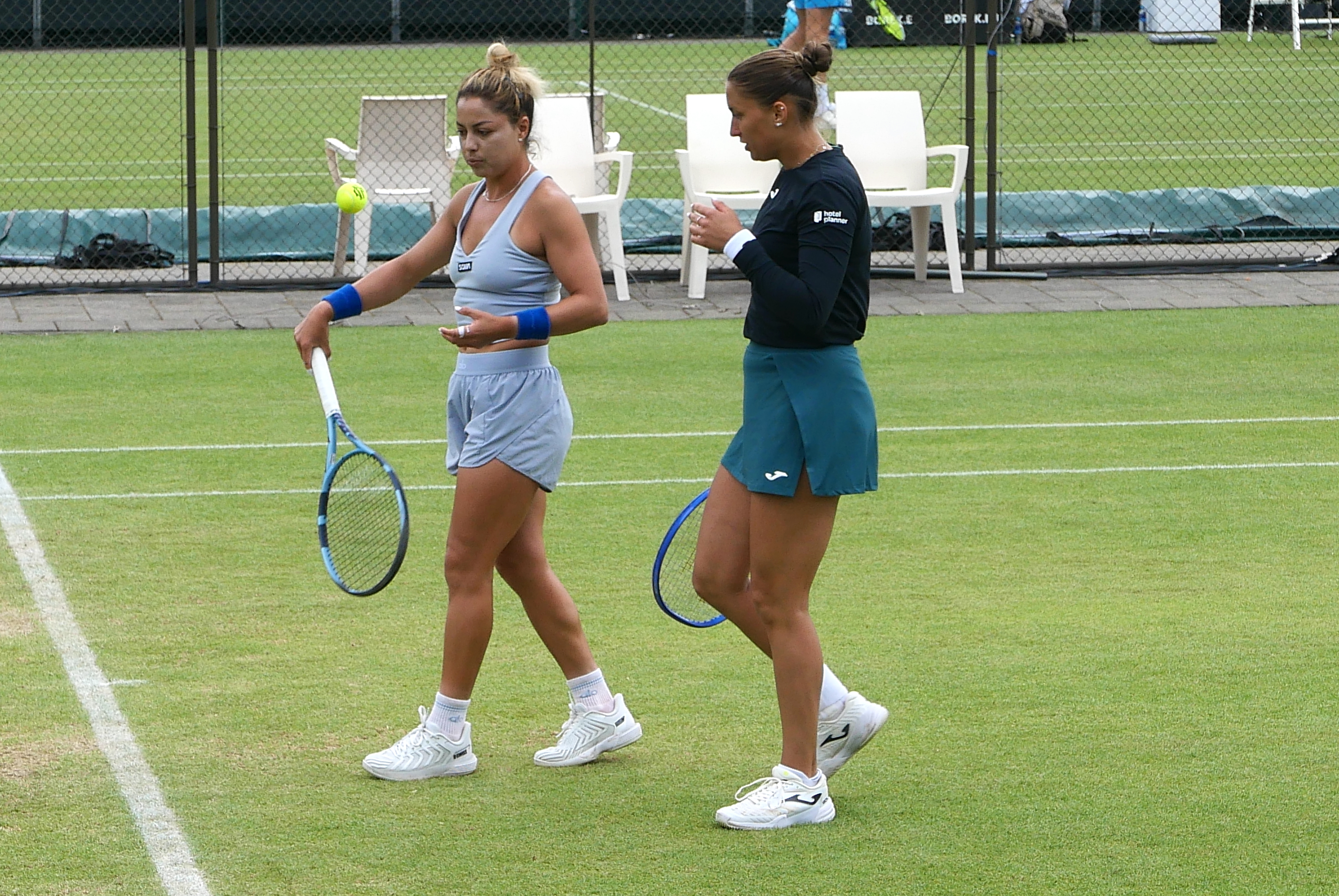
Zarazúa playing doubles with Panna Udvardy at the 2026 Rosmalen Open

Zarazúa became the first Mexican player in 25 years to win a match at the Australian Open when she defeated Taylor Townsend. She lost to fourth seed Jasmine Paolini in the second round.

She overcame Yanina Wickmayer to record her maiden win at Wimbledon, before losing to 13th seed and eventual finalist, Amanda Anisimova, in the second round.

At the US Open, Zarazúa defeated world No. 6, Madison Keys, her first top-10 win, making history for her country as the first Mexican woman to ever beat a top-10 opponent at the US Open, and the first to defeat a top-10 seed at any major since 1995 (when Angélica Gavaldón defeated No. 3 Jana Novotná in Australia). She lost her second-round match to Diane Parry in a third set tiebreak.

In September at the SP Open, wins over wildcard entrant Luiza Fullana, Berfu Cengiz and top seed Beatriz Haddad Maia saw Zarazúa reach her first tour-level semifinal since Acapulco in 2020. She lost in the last four to the eventual champion, Tiantsoa Rakotomanga Rajaonah, in straight sets.

In November, Zarazúa won her third WTA 125 singles title at the Austin Challenger, defeating Marina Stakusic in the final.

=== 2026: Memphis semifinal ===
In April at the Charleston Open, Zarazúa defeated wildcard entrant Sloane Stephens and 15th seed Hailey Baptiste, before losing to Yuliia Starodubtseva in the third round. In July at the inaugural Memphis Classic, she recorded straight-sets wins over second seed McCartney Kessler, Tatjana Maria and Anastasia Zakharova to reach her third WTA Tour semifinal, at which point her run was ended by Darja Vidmanova.

== Performance timeline ==
Key
| W | F | SF | QF | #R | RR | Q# | P# | DNQ | A | Z# | PO | G | S | B | NMS | NTI | P | NH |

(W) winner; (F) finalist; (SF) semifinalist; (QF) quarterfinalist; (#R) rounds 4, 3, 2, 1; (RR) round-robin stage; (Q#) qualification round; (P#) preliminary round; (DNQ) did not qualify; (A) absent; (Z#) Davis/Fed Cup Zonal Group (with number indication) or (PO) play-off; (G) gold, (S) silver or (B) bronze Olympic/Paralympic medal; (NMS) not a Masters tournament; (NTI) not a Tier I tournament; (P) postponed; (NH) not held; (SR) strike rate (events won / competed); (W–L) win–loss record.
To avoid confusion and double counting, these charts are updated at the conclusion of a tournament or when the player's participation has ended.

Only main-draw results in WTA Tour, Grand Slam tournaments, Fed Cup/Billie Jean King Cup, and Olympic Games are included in win–loss records.

=== Singles ===
Current through the 2026 China Open.

| Tournament | 2016 | 2017 | 2018 | 2019 | 2020 | 2021 | 2022 | 2023 | 2024 | 2025 | 2026 | SR | W–L | Win % |
|---|---|---|---|---|---|---|---|---|---|---|---|---|---|---|
Grand Slam tournaments
| Australian Open | A | A | A | A | A | Q2 | A | A | 1R | 2R | 1R | 0 / 3 | 1–3 | 25% |
| French Open | A | A | Q1 | A | 2R | Q1 | Q1 | A | 1R | 1R | 1R | 0 / 4 | 1–4 | 20% |
| Wimbledon | A | A | Q1 | A | NH | Q1 | A | A | 1R | 2R | 1R | 0 / 3 | 1–3 | 25% |
| US Open | A | A | Q1 | A | A | Q1 | Q1 | A | 2R | 2R | 1R | 0 / 3 | 2–3 | 40% |
| Win–loss | 0–0 | 0–0 | 0–0 | 0–0 | 1–1 | 0–0 | 0–0 | 0–0 | 1–4 | 3–4 | 0–4 | 0 / 13 | 5–13 | 28% |
WTA 1000
| Qatar Open (Note: The first Premier 5 event of the year has switched back and forth between the Dubai Tennis Championships and the Qatar Ladies Open since 2009. Dubai was classified as a Premier 5 event from 2009 to 2011 before being succeeded by Doha for the 2012–2014 period. In 2015, Dubai regained its Premier 5 status while Doha was demoted to Premier status. The Premier 5 tournaments were reclassified as WTA 1000 tournaments in 2021.) | A | NTI | A | NTI | A | NTI | A | NTI | A | 1R | Q1 | 0 / 1 | 0–1 | 0% |
| Dubai | NTI | A | NTI | A | NTI | A | NTI | A | A | Q1 | A | 0 / 0 | 0–0 | – |
| Indian Wells Open | A | A | A | A | NH | A | Q1 | A | Q1 | 1R | Q1 | 0 / 1 | 0–1 | 0% |
| Miami Open | A | A | A | A | NH | 2R | Q1 | A | Q1 | 1R | Q2 | 0 / 2 | 1–2 | 33% |
| Madrid Open | A | A | A | A | NH | A | A | A | Q2 | 1R | A | 0 / 1 | 0–1 | 0% |
| Italian Open | A | A | A | A | A | A | A | A | 1R | 1R | Q1 | 0 / 2 | 0–2 | 0% |
| Canadian Open | A | A | A | A | NH | A | A | A | A | 2R | 2R | 0 / 2 | 2–2 | 50% |
| Cincinnati Open | A | A | A | A | A | A | A | A | A | 2R | 1R | 1 / 2 | 1–2 | 33% |
| Guadalajara Open | NH | | | | | | Q2 | 1R | NTI | | A | 0 / 1 | 0–1 | 0% |
| Wuhan Open | A | A | A | A | NH | | | | A | A | A | 0 / 0 | 0–0 | – |
| China Open | A | A | A | A | NH | | | A | A | A | 2R | 0 / 1 | 1–1 | 50% |
Career statistics
| Tournaments | 1 | 2 | 3 | 3 | 2 | 6 | 3 | 1 | 10 | 17 | 7 | Career total: 52 | | |
| Titles | 0 | 0 | 0 | 0 | 0 | 0 | 0 | 0 | 0 | 0 | 0 | Career total: 0 | | |
| Finals | 0 | 0 | 0 | 0 | 0 | 0 | 0 | 0 | 0 | 0 | 0 | Career total: 0 | | |
| Hard win–loss | 0–1 | 0–2 | 1–2 | 0–2 | 3–1 | 2–4 | 0–2 | 0–1 | 5–6 | 9–13 | 4–7 | 0 / 41 | 24–41 | 37% |
| Clay win–loss | 0–0 | 0–0 | 1–1 | 0–1 | 1–1 | 0–2 | 0–1 | 0–0 | 1–3 | 0–3 | 0–0 | 0 / 12 | 3–12 | 20% |
| Grass win–loss | 0–0 | 0–0 | 0–0 | 0–0 | 0–0 | 0–0 | 0–0 | 0–0 | 0–1 | 1–1 | 0–0 | 0 / 2 | 1–2 | 33% |
| Overall win–loss | 0–1 | 0–2 | 2–3 | 0–3 | 4–2 | 2–6 | 0–3 | 0–1 | 6–10 | 10–17 | 4–7 | 0 / 55 | 28–55 | 34% |
| Win % | 0% | 0% | 40% | 0% | 67% | 25% | 0% | 0% | 38% | 37% | 36% | Career total: 34% | | |
| Year-end ranking | 291 | 248 | 258 | 280 | 142 | 127 | 350 | 165 | 60 | 70 | | $2,226,278 | | |

== WTA 125 finals ==
=== Singles: 4 (3 titles, 1 runner-up) ===
| Result | W–L | Date | Tournament | Surface | Opponent | Score |
|---|---|---|---|---|---|---|
| Loss | 0–1 | Aug 2021 | Concord Open, United States | Hard | (Poland) Magdalena Fręch | 3–6, 6–7^{(4–7)} |
| Win | 1–1 | Dec 2023 | Montevideo Open, Uruguay | Clay | (France) Diane Parry | 7–5, 3–6, 6–4 |
| Win | 2–1 | Nov 2024 | Charleston 125, United States | Clay | (United States) Hanna Chang | 6–1, 7–6^{(7–4)} |
| Win | 3–1 | Nov 2025 | Austin Challenger, United States | Hard | (Canada) Marina Stakusic | 6–4, 3–6, 6–3 |

=== Doubles: 3 (1 title, 2 runner-ups) ===
| Result | W–L | Date | Tournament | Surface | Partner | Opponents | Score |
|---|---|---|---|---|---|---|---|
| Win | 1–0 | Feb 2024 | Puerto Vallarta Open, Mexico | Hard | Iryna Shymanovich | (Italy) Angelica Moratelli (Italy) Camilla Rosatello | 6–2, 7–6^{(7–1)} |
| Loss | 1–1 | Jun 2024 | Bari Open, Italy | Clay | (Italy) Angelica Moratelli | Irina Khromacheva (Kazakhstan) Anna Danilina | 1–6, 3–6 |
| Loss | 1–2 | Jun 2024 | Internacional de Valencia, Spain | Clay | (Italy) Angelica Moratelli | (Poland) Katarzyna Piter (Hungary) Fanny Stollár | 1–6, 6–4, [8–10] |

== ITF Circuit finals ==
=== Singles: 19 (8 titles, 11 runner-ups) ===
| Legend W100 tournaments (3–2) W60/75 tournaments (2–2) W25 tournaments (1–5) W10 tournaments (2–2) | Finals by surface Hard (5–5) Clay (3–6) |

| Result | W–L | Date | Tournament | Tier | Surface | Opponent | Score |
|---|---|---|---|---|---|---|---|
| Loss | 0–1 | Oct 2013 | ITF Quintana Roo, Mexico | 10,000 | Hard | (United States) Denise Muresan | 4–6, 1–6 |
| Loss | 0–2 | Oct 2013 | ITF Quintana Roo, Mexico | 10,000 | Hard | (United States) Ashley Weinhold | 3–6, 6–4, 5–7 |
| Win | 1–2 | Apr 2016 | ITF León, Mexico | 10,000 | Hard | (Mexico) Ana Sofía Sánchez | 2–6, 6–3, 6–2 |
| Win | 2–2 | May 2016 | Solgironès Open, Spain | 10,000 | Clay | (Spain) Irene Burillo | 6–7^{(3)}, 6–1, 6–4 |
| Loss | 2–3 | Jul 2017 | ITF Getxo, Spain | 25,000 | Clay | (Romania) Mihaela Buzărnescu | 2–6, 2–6 |
| Loss | 2–4 | Jul 2017 | ITF Torino, Italy | 25,000 | Clay | (Italy) Deborah Chiesa | 3–6, 6–2, 5–7 |
| Loss | 2–5 | Oct 2017 | ITF Pula, Italy | 25,000 | Clay | (Slovenia) Polona Hercog | 4–6, 1–6 |
| Loss | 2–6 | Sep 2020 | ITF Prague, Czech Republic | W25 | Clay | (Slovakia) Jana Čepelová | 4–6, 6–7^{(4)} |
| Loss | 2–7 | Jan 2023 | ITF Malibu, United States | W25 | Hard | (United States) Jamie Loeb | 4–6, 1–6 |
| Win | 3–7 | Jan 2023 | ITF Boca Raton, US | W25 | Clay | (Switzerland) Lulu Sun | 6–2, 7–5 |
| Loss | 3–8 | May 2023 | Pelham Pro Classic, US | W60 | Clay | (Russia) Veronika Miroshnichenko | 6–7^{(5)}, 2–6 |
| Win | 4–8 | Aug 2023 | Lexington Challenger, US | W60 | Hard | (United States) Caroline Dolehide | 1–6, 7–6^{(4)}, 7–5 |
| Loss | 4–9 | Sep 2023 | ITF Templeton Pro, US | W60 | Hard | (United States) Taylor Townsend | 3–6, 1–6 |
| Loss | 4–10 | Aug 2024 | Cary Tennis Classic, US | W100 | Hard | (Spain) Nuria Párrizas Díaz | 3–6, 6–3, 6–7^{(2)} |
| Win | 5–10 | Sep 2024 | ITF Templeton Pro, US | W75 | Hard | (United States) Usue Maitane Arconada | 6–4, 6–3 |
| Win | 6–10 | Oct 2024 | Tyler Pro Challenge, US | W100 | Hard | (United States) Iva Jovic | 6–4, 6–2 |
| Loss | 6–11 | Apr 2025 | Open Villa de Madrid, Spain | W100 | Clay | (Egypt) Mayar Sherif | 3–6, 4–6 |
| Win | 7–11 | Oct 2025 | Tennis Classic of Macon, US | W100 | Hard | (United States) Anna Rogers | 6–2, 6–1 |
| Win | 8–11 | Apr 2026 | Charlottesville Open, US | W100 | Clay | (Argentina) Martina Capurro Taborda | 6–1, 1–6, 7–5 |

=== Doubles: 27 (17 titles, 10 runner-ups) ===
| Legend $100,000 tournaments (2–0) $80,000 tournaments (0–1) $50/60,000 tournaments (2–2) $25,000 tournaments (9–6) $10/15,000 tournaments (4–1) | Finals by surface Hard (6–3) Clay (11–7) |

| Result | W–L | Date | Tournament | Tier | Surface | Partner | Opponents | Score |
|---|---|---|---|---|---|---|---|---|
| Win | 1–0 | Dec 2014 | ITF Mérida, Mexico | 25,000 | Hard | (Germany) Tatjana Maria | (United States) Jan Abaza (Chinese Taipei) Hsu Chieh-yu | 7–6^{(1)}, 6–1 |
| Win | 2–0 | Dec 2014 | ITF Mérida, Mexico | 25,000 | Hard | (Germany) Tatjana Maria | (Venezuela) Andrea Gámiz (Russia) Valeria Savinykh | 6–4, 6–1 |
| Loss | 2–1 | Apr 2015 | ITF Guadalajara, Mexico | 15,000 | Hard | (Brazil) Maria Fernanda Alves | (Mexico) Marcela Zacarías (Brazil) Laura Pigossi | 1–6, 2–6 |
| Win | 3–1 | Jun 2015 | ITF Charlotte, US | 10,000 | Clay | (Brazil) Maria Fernanda Alves | (United States) Lauren Herring (Australia) Ellen Perez | 6–4, 6–7^{(6)}, [10–8] |
| Win | 4–1 | Jun 2015 | ITF Manzanillo, Mexico | 10,000 | Hard | (United States) Zoë Gwen Scandalis | (Chile) Bárbara Gatica (Argentina) Stephanie Petit | 6–1, 6–2 |
| Win | 5–1 | Oct 2015 | ITF Rock Hill, US | 25,000 | Hard | (Bosnia and Herzegovina) Ema Burgić Bucko | (Bulgaria) Elitsa Kostova (Argentina) Florencia Molinero | 7–5, 6–2 |
| Win | 6–1 | Dec 2015 | ITF Santiago, Chile | 25,000 | Clay | (Mexico) Victoria Rodríguez | (Argentina) Florencia Molinero (Brazil) Laura Pigossi | 6–2, 5–7, [10–7] |
| Win | 7–1 | Apr 2016 | ITF León, Mexico | 10,000 | Hard | (South Africa) Chanel Simmonds | (Mexico) Sabastiani Leon (Mexico) Nazari Urbina | 6–0, 6–2 |
| Loss | 7–2 | May 2016 | ITF Naples, US | 25,000 | Clay | (United States) Sophie Chang | (Brazil) Gabriela Cé (Poland) Justyna Jegiołka | 1–6, 2–6 |
| Win | 8–2 | May 2016 | ITF Madrid, Spain | 10,000 | Clay | (Mexico) Marcela Zacarías | (Norway) Andrea Raaholt (Bosnia and Herzegovina) Jasmina Tinjić | 6–4, 6–4 |
| Loss | 8–3 | Sep 2016 | ITF Lubbock, US | 25,000 | Hard | (Bosnia and Herzegovina) Ema Burgić Bucko | (United States) Emina Bektas (United States) Catherine Harrison | 3–6, 4–6 |
| Loss | 8–4 | Nov 2016 | Waco Showdown, US | 50,000 | Hard | (Romania) Mihaela Buzărnescu | (Netherlands) Michaëlla Krajicek (United States) Taylor Townsend | w/o |
| Win | 9–4 | Jan 2017 | ITF Wesley Chapel, US | 25,000 | Clay | (South Africa) Chanel Simmonds | (United States) Elizabeth Halbauer (United States) Sofia Kenin | 6–2, 7–6^{(5)} |
| Loss | 9–5 | Apr 2017 | ITF Indian Harbour Beach, US | 80,000 | Clay | (Brazil) Laura Pigossi | (United States) Kristie Ahn (United States) Quinn Gleason | 3–6, 2–6 |
| Loss | 9–6 | May 2017 | Solgironès Open, Spain | 25,000 | Clay | (Romania) Jaqueline Cristian | (Russia) Olesya Pervushina (Ukraine) Valeriya Strakhova | 5–7, 2–6 |
| Win | 10–6 | Jun 2017 | ITF Ystad, Sweden | 25,000 | Clay | (Russia) Valentyna Ivakhnenko | (Netherlands) Quirine Lemoine (Netherlands) Eva Wacanno | 6–3, 3–6, [10–5] |
| Win | 11–6 | Oct 2017 | ITF Seville, Spain | 25,000 | Clay | (Brazil) Luisa Stefani | (Spain) Estrella Cabeza Candela (Venezuela) Andrea Gámiz | 7–6^{(2)}, 7–6^{(3)} |
| Win | 12–6 | Nov 2017 | ITF Sant Cugat, Spain | 25,000 | Clay | (Brazil) Luisa Stefani | (Serbia) Olga Danilović (Spain) Guiomar Maristany | 6–1, 6–4 |
| Win | 13–6 | Jul 2018 | Internazionale di Roma, Italy | 60,000 | Clay | (Brazil) Laura Pigossi | (Italy) Anastasia Grymalska (Italy) Giorgia Marchetti | 6–1, 4–6, [13–11] |
| Win | 14–6 | Jul 2018 | Ashland Tennis Classic, US | 60,000 | Hard | (Serbia) Jovana Jakšić | (United States) Sanaz Marand (United States) Whitney Osuigwe | 6–3, 5–7, [10–4] |
| Loss | 14–7 | Sep 2018 | Open de Valencia, Spain | 60,000 | Clay | (Greece) Valentini Grammatikopoulou | (Russia) Irina Khromacheva (Serbia) Nina Stojanović | 1–6, 4–6 |
| Loss | 14–8 | Nov 2018 | ITF Sant Cugat, Spain | 25,000 | Clay | (Romania) Andreea Roșca | (Romania) Miriam Bulgaru (Romania) Nicoleta Dascălu | 1–6, 6–4, [7–10] |
| Win | 15–8 | Oct 2019 | ITF Cucúta, Colombia | W25 | Clay | (Brazil) Carolina Alves | (Colombia) Emiliana Arango (Argentina) Victoria Bosio | 6–1, ret. |
| Loss | 15–9 | Nov 2019 | ITF Orlando, US | W25 | Clay | (Brazil) Carolina Alves | (United States) Katharine Fahey (Germany) Stephanie Wagner | 4–6, 6–2, [10–7] |
| Win | 16–9 | May 2022 | Solgironès Open, Spain | W100+H | Clay | (Andorra) Victoria Jiménez Kasintseva | (United Kingdom) Alicia Barnett (United Kingdom) Olivia Nicholls | 6–4, 2–6, [10–8] |
| Loss | 16–10 | Jan 2023 | ITF Boca Raton, US | W25 | Clay | (Canada) Kayla Cross | (France) Tiphanie Fiquet (United States) Ashley Lahey | 6–4, 1–6, [4–10] |
| Win | 17–10 | Jul 2023 | Championnats de Granby, Canada | W100 | Clay | (Mexico) Marcela Zacarías | (United States) Carmen Corley (United States) Ivana Corley | 6–3, 6–3 |

== Wins against top 10 players ==
- Zarazúa has a 1–6 record against players who were, at the time the match was played, ranked in the top 10.

| # | Opponent | Rk | Tournament | Surface | Rd | Score | Rk | Ref |
|---|---|---|---|---|---|---|---|---|
2025
| 1. | (United States) Madison Keys | 6 | US Open, United States | Hard | 1R | 6–7^{(12–10)}, 7–6^{(7–3)}, 7–5 | 82 | |

- Key: (Rk) first use, opponent rank; (Rd) round; (Rk) 2nd use, player rank; (Ref) reference; (F) final; (SF) semifinal; (QF) quarterfinal; (#R) rounds 4, 3, 2, 1; (RR) round-robin stage; (Q#) qualifying rounds or stages (3), 2, 1.
