= 2024 Guadalajara Open Akron =

- Date: 9 – 15 September
- Edition: 3rd
- Category: WTA 500
- Draw: 28S / 16D
- Prize money: $922,573
- Surface: Hard
- Location: Guadalajara, Mexico
- Venue: Panamerican Tennis Center

Champions

Singles
- (Poland) Magdalena Fręch

Doubles
- (Kazakhstan) Anna Danilina / Irina Khromacheva
- Guadalajara Open Akron

The 2024 Guadalajara Open Akron (also known as the Guadalajara Open Akron presented by Santander for sponsorship reasons) was a women's tennis tournament played on outdoor hardcourts. It was the 3rd edition of the tournament, a WTA 500 event on the 2024 WTA Tour (downgraded from WTA 1000 status in previous years). It was held at the Panamerican Tennis Center in Zapopan, Guadalajara, Mexico, from 9 to 15 September 2024.

== Champions ==
=== Singles ===
- (Poland) Magdalena Fręch def. (Australia) Olivia Gadecki 7–6^{(7–5)}, 6–4

=== Doubles ===
- (Kazakhstan) Anna Danilina / Irina Khromacheva def. (Georgia (country)) Oksana Kalashnikova / Kamilla Rakhimova, 2–6, 7–5, [10–7]

== Point distribution ==
Event	W	F	SF	QF	Round of 16	Round of 32	Q	Q2	Q1
Singles	500	325	195	108	60	1	25	13	1
Doubles	500	325	195	108	1	—N/a	—N/a	—N/a	—N/a

== Singles main-draw entrants ==
=== Seeds ===
Country	Player	Rank^{†}	Seed
LAT	Jeļena Ostapenko	10	1
USA	Danielle Collins	11	2
	Victoria Azarenka	20	3
FRA	Caroline Garcia	30	4
POL	Magdalena Fręch	43	5
CZE	Marie Bouzková	45	6
	Veronika Kudermetova	46	7
USA	Caroline Dolehide	49	8

^{†} Rankings are as of 26 August 2024.

=== Other entrants ===
The following players received wildcards into the main draw:

- (Mexico) Ana Sofía Sánchez
- (Canada) Marina Stakusic

The following players received entry from the qualifying draw:

- (Australia) Kimberly Birrell
- (Philippines) Alexandra Eala
- (Australia) Olivia Gadecki
- (Serbia) Aleksandra Krunić
- (Japan) Ena Shibahara
- (Italy) Lucrezia Stefanini

The following player received entry as a lucky loser:

- (United States) Sachia Vickery

=== Withdrawals ===
- (Spain) Paula Badosa → replaced by (Mexico) Renata Zarazúa
- (Brazil) Beatriz Haddad Maia → replaced by (United States) Emina Bektas
- Anna Kalinskaya → replaced by (Italy) Martina Trevisan
- (United States) Emma Navarro → replaced by (Slovakia) Anna Karolína Schmiedlová
- (Greece) Maria Sakkari → replaced by (Germany) Tatjana Maria
- (United States) Taylor Townsend → replaced by (United States) Sachia Vickery
- (China) Zheng Qinwen → replaced by (United States) Ashlyn Krueger

== Doubles main-draw entrants ==
=== Seeds ===
Country	Player	Country	Player	Rank^{1}	Seed
NOR	Ulrikke Eikeri	EST	Ingrid Neel	80	1
HUN	Tímea Babos	UKR	Nadiia Kichenok	87	2
KAZ	Anna Danilina		Irina Khromacheva	88	3
GEO	Oksana Kalashnikova		Kamilla Rakhimova	152	4

- ^{1} Rankings as of 26 August 2024.

=== Other entrants ===
The following pair received a wildcard into the doubles main draw:

- (Hong Kong) Eudice Chong / (Mexico) Ana Sofía Sánchez
