= 2023 Guadalajara Open Akron =

- Date: 17 – 23 September
- Edition: 2nd
- Category: WTA 1000
- Draw: 56S / 28D
- Prize money: $2,788,468
- Surface: Hard
- Location: Guadalajara, Mexico
- Venue: Panamerican Tennis Center

Champions

Singles
- (Greece) Maria Sakkari

Doubles
- (Australia) Storm Hunter / (Belgium) Elise Mertens
- Guadalajara Open Akron

The 2023 Guadalajara Open Akron (also known as the Guadalajara Open Akron presented by Santander for sponsorship reasons) was a women's tennis tournament played on outdoor hardcourts. It was the 2nd edition of the tournament, a WTA 1000 event on the 2023 WTA Tour. It was held at the Panamerican Tennis Center in Zapopan, Guadalajara, Mexico, from 17 to 23 September 2023.

== Champions ==
=== Singles ===
- (Greece) Maria Sakkari def. (United States) Caroline Dolehide, 7–5, 6–3

=== Doubles ===
- (Australia) Storm Hunter / (Belgium) Elise Mertens def. (Canada) Gabriela Dabrowski / (New Zealand) Erin Routliffe, 3–6, 6–2, [10–4]

== Point distribution ==
Event	W	F	SF	QF	Round of 16	Round of 32	Round of 56	Q	Q2	Q1
Singles	900	585	350	190	105	60	1	30	20	1
Doubles	900	585	350	190	105	1	—N/a	—N/a	—N/a	—N/a

== Prize money ==
Event	W	F	SF	QF	Round of 16	Round of 32	Round of 56	Q2	Q1
Singles	$454,500	$267,690	$138,000	$63,350	$31,650	$17,930	$12,848	$7,650	$4,000
Doubles*	$133,840	$75,286	$40,432	$20,914	$11,850	$7,900	—N/a	—N/a	—N/a

_{*per team}

== Singles main-draw entrants ==
=== Seeds ===
Country	Player	Rank^{†}	Seed
TUN	Ons Jabeur	7	1
GRE	Maria Sakkari	9	2
FRA	Caroline Garcia	10	3
USA	Madison Keys	11	4
~~SUI~~	~~Belinda Bencic~~	~~15~~	~~5~~
LAT	Jeļena Ostapenko	16	6
	Veronika Kudermetova	18	7
	Ekaterina Alexandrova	19	8
~~BRA~~	~~Beatriz Haddad Maia~~	~~20~~	~~9~~
	Victoria Azarenka	23	10
	Anastasia Potapova	27	11
UKR	Anhelina Kalinina	28	12
BEL	Elise Mertens	29	13
EGY	Mayar Sherif	32	14
ITA	Jasmine Paolini	33	15
CZE	Karolína Plíšková	34	16

^{†} Rankings are as of 11 September 2023.

=== Other entrants ===
The following players received wildcards into the main draw:

- (Canada) Eugenie Bouchard
- (Mexico) Lya Isabel Fernández Olivares
- (Australia) Ajla Tomljanović

The following players received entry from the qualifying draw:

- (United States) Ann Li
- (United States) Maria Mateas
- (United States) Grace Min
- (United States) Asia Muhammad
- (Mexico) Ana Sofía Sánchez
- (Netherlands) Demi Schuurs
- (Japan) Ena Shibahara
- (Canada) Carol Zhao

The following players received entry as lucky losers:

- (United States) Elvina Kalieva
- (United States) Sachia Vickery

=== Withdrawals ===
- (Canada) Bianca Andreescu → replaced by (United States) Hailey Baptiste
- (Spain) Paula Badosa → replaced by (Belgium) Yanina Wickmayer
- (Switzerland) Belinda Bencic → replaced by (United States) Elvina Kalieva
- (Czech Republic) Marie Bouzková → replaced by (Colombia) Emiliana Arango
- (United States) Jennifer Brady → replaced by (United States) Louisa Chirico
- (Italy) Elisabetta Cocciaretto → replaced by (Australia) Storm Hunter
- (United States) Coco Gauff → replaced by (United States) Sofia Kenin
- (Brazil) Beatriz Haddad Maia → replaced by (United States) Sachia Vickery
- Daria Kasatkina → replaced by (United States) Robin Montgomery
- (Czech Republic) Petra Kvitová → replaced by Iryna Shymanovich
- (Spain) Rebeka Masarova → replaced by (France) Kristina Mladenovic
- (United States) Jessica Pegula → replaced by (United States) Caroline Dolehide
- (United States) Bernarda Pera → replaced by (Mexico) Renata Zarazúa
- (Kazakhstan) Elena Rybakina → replaced by (United States) Taylor Townsend
- (Poland) Iga Świątek → replaced by (Ukraine) Dayana Yastremska

== Doubles main-draw entrants ==
=== Seeds ===
Country	Player	Country	Player	Rank^{1}	Seed
AUS	Storm Hunter	BEL	Elise Mertens	8	1
CAN	Leylah Fernandez	USA	Taylor Townsend	29	2
CAN	Gabriela Dabrowski	NZL	Erin Routliffe	29	3
JPN	Shuko Aoyama	JPN	Ena Shibahara	30	4
MEX	Giuliana Olmos	BRA	Luisa Stefani	34	5
USA	Nicole Melichar-Martinez	AUS	Ellen Perez	41	6
KAZ	Anna Danilina	CHN	Yang Zhaoxuan	59	7
JPN	Miyu Kato	INA	Aldila Sutjiadi	63	8

- ^{1} Rankings as of 11 September 2023.

=== Other entrants ===
The following pairs received wildcards into the doubles main draw:

- (Canada) Eugenie Bouchard / (Mexico) María Fernanda Navarro Oliva
- Veronika Miroshnichenko / (Mexico) Renata Zarazúa

The following pair received entry as alternates:

- (United States) Anna Rogers / (Australia) Olivia Tjandramulia

=== Withdrawals ===
- (United States) Danielle Collins / (Netherlands) Demi Schuurs → replaced by (United States) Anna Rogers / (Australia) Olivia Tjandramulia
