= 2024 Guadalajara Open Akron – Doubles =

Doubles
- 2024 Guadalajara Open Akron

Final
- Champions: (Kazakhstan) Anna Danilina; Irina Khromacheva
- Runners-up: (Georgia (country)) Oksana Kalashnikova; Kamilla Rakhimova
- Score: 2–6, 7–5, [10–7]

Details
- Draw: 16
- Seeds: 4

Events
Singles	Doubles
← 2023 ·	Guadalajara Open Akron	· 2025 →

Anna Danilina and Irina Khromacheva defeated Oksana Kalashnikova and Kamilla Rakhimova in the final, 2–6, 7–5, [10–7] to win the doubles tennis title at the 2024 Guadalajara Open.

Storm Hunter and Elise Mertens were the reigning champions, but did not participate this year.

== Seeds ==
1. (Norway) Ulrikke Eikeri / (Estonia) Ingrid Neel (first round)
2. (Hungary) Tímea Babos / (Ukraine) Nadiia Kichenok (first round)
3. (Kazakhstan) Anna Danilina / Irina Khromacheva (champions)
4. (Georgia (country)) Oksana Kalashnikova / Kamilla Rakhimova (final)

== Draw ==
=== Key ===
- Q = Qualifier
- WC = Wild card
- LL = Lucky loser
- Alt = Alternate
- ITF = ITF entry
- PR = Protected ranking
- SR = Special ranking
- SE = Special exempt
- JE = Junior exempt
- JR = Junior Accelerator Programme entrant
- CO = College Accelerator Programme entrant
- NG = Next Gen Accelerator Program entrant
- w/o = Walkover
- r = Retired
- d = Defaulted

=== Draw ===
First round
1	(Norway) U Eikeri (Estonia) I Neel	1	6^{2}
(United States) E Bektas (Serbia) A Krunić	6	7^{7}
WC	(Hong Kong) E Chong (Mexico) AS Sánchez	5	4
(Spain) Y Cavallé Reimers (Ukraine) V Strakhova	7	6
3	(Kazakhstan) A Danilina; I Khromacheva	6	6
(United States) K Day (Canada) R Marino	0	2
(Italy) A Moratelli (United States) S Santamaria	3	6	[9]
(Poland) K Piter (Hungary) F Stollár	6	3	[11]
(United States) A Rogers (United States) A Smith	1	6	[4]
V Savinykh (Canada) M Stakusic	6	3	[10]
(Colombia) C Osorio (Japan) E Shibahara	6	3	[10]
4	(Georgia (country)) O Kalashnikova; K Rakhimova	3	6	[12]
(United Kingdom) S Murray Sharan (United Kingdom) E Silva	6	6
M Kozyreva (Mexico) R Zarazúa	3	3
(United States) J Aney (Germany) L Papadakis	6	2	[10]
2	(Hungary) T Babos (Ukraine) N Kichenok	3	6	[5]

Quarterfinals
(United States) E Bektas (Serbia) A Krunić	4	7	[7]
(Spain) Y Cavallé Reimers (Ukraine) V Strakhova	6	5	[10]
3	(Kazakhstan) A Danilina; I Khromacheva	6	6
(Poland) K Piter (Hungary) F Stollár	3	4
V Savinykh (Canada) M Stakusic	2	4
4	(Georgia (country)) O Kalashnikova; K Rakhimova	6	6
(United Kingdom) S Murray Sharan (United Kingdom) E Silva	6	6
(United States) J Aney (Germany) L Papadakis	3	4

Semifinals
(Spain) Y Cavallé Reimers (Ukraine) V Strakhova	1	4
3	(Kazakhstan) A Danilina; I Khromacheva	6	6
4	(Georgia (country)) O Kalashnikova; K Rakhimova	6	6
(United Kingdom) S Murray Sharan (United Kingdom) E Silva	4	3

Final
3	(Kazakhstan) A Danilina; I Khromacheva	2	7	[10]
4	(Georgia (country)) O Kalashnikova; K Rakhimova	6	5	[7]
