= 2024 Guadalajara Open Akron – Singles =

Singles
- 2024 Guadalajara Open Akron

Final
- Champion: (Poland) Magdalena Fręch
- Runner-up: (Australia) Olivia Gadecki
- Score: 7–6^{(7–5)}, 6–4

Details
- Draw: 28 (6 Q / 4 WC )
- Seeds: 8

Events
Singles	Doubles
← 2023 ·	Guadalajara Open Akron	· 2025 →

Magdalena Fręch defeated Olivia Gadecki in the final, 7–6^{(7–5)}, 6–4 to win the singles tennis title at the 2024 Guadalajara Open. It was her first WTA Tour title.

Maria Sakkari was the reigning champion, but withdrew before the start of the tournament.

== Seeds ==
The top four seeds received a bye into the second round.

1. (Latvia) Jeļena Ostapenko (second round)
2. (United States) Danielle Collins (second round)
3. Victoria Azarenka (second round, retired)
4. (France) Caroline Garcia (semifinals)
5. (Poland) Magdalena Fręch (champion)
6. (Czech Republic) Marie Bouzková (quarterfinals, withdrew)
7. Veronika Kudermetova (second round)
8. (United States) Caroline Dolehide (first round)

== Draw ==
=== Key ===
- Q = Qualifier
- WC = Wild card
- LL = Lucky loser
- Alt = Alternate
- ITF = ITF entry
- PR = Protected ranking
- SR = Special ranking
- SE = Special exempt
- JE = Junior exempt
- JR = Junior Accelerator Programme entrant
- CO = College Accelerator Programme entrant
- NG = Next Gen Accelerator Program entrant
- w/o = Walkover
- r = Retired
- d = Defaulted

=== Finals ===
Semifinals
5	(Poland) Magdalena Fręch	7^{7}	7
4	(France) Caroline Garcia	6^{4}	5
(Colombia) Camila Osorio	2	3
Q	(Australia) Olivia Gadecki	6	6

Final
5	(Poland) Magdalena Fręch	7^{7}	6
Q	(Australia) Olivia Gadecki	6^{5}	4

=== Top half ===
First round
WC	(Canada) M Stakusic	6	6
(Slovakia) AK Schmiedlová	2	4
(Germany) T Maria	5	2
(United States) A Krueger	7	6
(United States) E Bektas	4	4
5	(Poland) M Fręch	6	6
Q	(Australia) K Birrell	4	6^{4}
Q	(Japan) E Shibahara	6	7^{7}
WC	(Mexico) AS Sánchez	0	6	2
Q	(Italy) L Stefanini	6	3	6
Q	(Philippines) A Eala	2	2
6	(Czech Republic) M Bouzková	6	6

Second round
1	(Latvia) J Ostapenko	3	7	6^{0}
WC	(Canada) M Stakusic	6	5	7^{7}
(United States) A Krueger	6	3	1
5	(Poland) M Fręch	3	6	6
4	(France) C Garcia	7^{7}	7^{7}
Q	(Japan) E Shibahara	6^{3}	6^{5}
Q	(Italy) L Stefanini	2	1
6	(Czech Republic) M Bouzková	6	6

Quarterfinals
WC	(Canada) M Stakusic	4	3
5	(Poland) M Fręch	6	6
4	(France) C Garcia	w/o
6	(Czech Republic) M Bouzková

Semifinals
5	(Poland) M Fręch	7^{7}	7
4	(France) C Garcia	6^{4}	5

=== Bottom half ===
First round
7	V Kudermetova	6	6
LL	(United States) S Vickery	4	4
(Colombia) C Osorio	6	6
(United States) H Baptiste	3	2
Q	(Serbia) A Krunić	5	0
K Rakhimova	7	6
8	(United States) C Dolehide	3	2
(Italy) M Trevisan	6	6
(Ukraine) A Kalinina	1	6	1
(Mexico) R Zarazúa	6	3	6
(United States) S Stephens	4	3
Q	(Australia) O Gadecki	6	6

Second round
7	V Kudermetova	6^{5}	7^{7}	5
(Colombia) C Osorio	7^{7}	6^{2}	7
K Rakhimova	6	3
3	V Azarenka	2	0^{r}
(Italy) M Trevisan	6	6
(Mexico) R Zarazúa	4	3
Q	(Australia) O Gadecki	6	6
2	(United States) D Collins	3	3

Quarterfinals
(Colombia) C Osorio	7^{8}	6
K Rakhimova	6^{6}	2
(Italy) M Trevisan	2	6	1
Q	(Australia) O Gadecki	6	3	6

Semifinals
(Colombia) C Osorio	2	3
Q	(Australia) O Gadecki	6	6

== Qualifying ==
=== Seeds ===
1. (Argentina) Julia Riera (first round)
2. (United States) Sachia Vickery (qualifying competition, lucky loser)
3. (Australia) Maya Joint (qualifying competition)
4. (Canada) Rebecca Marino (qualifying competition)
5. (Colombia) Emiliana Arango (first round)
6. (Australia) Taylah Preston (qualifying competition)
7. (Australia) Kimberly Birrell (qualified)
8. (Philippines) Alexandra Eala (qualified)
9. (Australia) Olivia Gadecki (qualified)
10. (Italy) Lucrezia Stefanini (qualified)
11. (United States) Kayla Day (first round)
12. (United States) Elizabeth Mandlik (qualifying competition)

=== Qualifiers ===
1. (Philippines) Alexandra Eala
2. (Italy) Lucrezia Stefanini
3. (Australia) Olivia Gadecki
4. (Serbia) Aleksandra Krunić
5. (Japan) Ena Shibahara
6. (Australia) Kimberly Birrell

=== Lucky loser ===
1. (United States) Sachia Vickery

=== Draw ===
==== First qualifier ====
First round
1	(Argentina) Julia Riera	6^{5}	5
(United Kingdom) Samantha Murray Sharan	7^{7}	7
(Hungary) Fanny Stollár	1	2
8	(Philippines) Alexandra Eala	6	6

Qualifying competition
(United Kingdom) Samantha Murray Sharan	4	2
8	(Philippines) Alexandra Eala	6	6

==== Second qualifier ====
First round
2	(United States) Sachia Vickery	6^{5}	7	6
(Hong Kong) Eudice Chong	7^{7}	5	1
Valeria Savinykh	1	1
10/WC	(Italy) Lucrezia Stefanini	6	6

Qualifying competition
2	(United States) Sachia Vickery	5	6	3
10/WC	(Italy) Lucrezia Stefanini	7	2	6

==== Third qualifier ====
First round
3	(Australia) Maya Joint	7^{7}	7
WC	(Croatia) Ana Konjuh	6^{3}	5
(Hungary) Tímea Babos	2	3
9	(Australia) Olivia Gadecki	6	6

Qualifying competition
3	(Australia) Maya Joint	1	3
9	(Australia) Olivia Gadecki	6	6

==== Fourth qualifier ====
First round
4	(Canada) Rebecca Marino	6	6
(Ukraine) Valeriya Strakhova	2	4
(Serbia) Aleksandra Krunić	6	6^{5}	6
11	(United States) Kayla Day	4	7^{7}	3

Qualifying competition
4	(Canada) Rebecca Marino	6	3	4
(Serbia) Aleksandra Krunić	3	6	6

==== Fifth qualifier ====
First round
5	(Colombia) Emiliana Arango	4	1
(Japan) Ena Shibahara	6	6
WC	(Greece) Dimitra Pavlou	3	3
12	(United States) Elizabeth Mandlik	6	6

Qualifying competition
(Japan) Ena Shibahara	6	6^{4}	6
12	(United States) Elizabeth Mandlik	3	7^{7}	3

==== Sixth qualifier ====
First round
6	(Australia) Taylah Preston	6	6
Maria Kozyreva	2	4
WC	(United States) Victoria Hu	5	5
7	(Australia) Kimberly Birrell	7	7

Qualifying competition
6	(Australia) Taylah Preston	3	6	4
7	(Australia) Kimberly Birrell	6	1	6
