= 2023 Italian Open – Women's singles =

Women's singles
- 2023 Italian Open

Final
- Champion: (Kazakhstan) Elena Rybakina
- Runner-up: (Ukraine) Anhelina Kalinina
- Score: 6–4, 1–0, ret.

Details
- Draw: 96 (12 Q / 8 WC )
- Seeds: 32

Events
Singles	men	women
Doubles	men	women
- Italian Open

Elena Rybakina won the women's singles tennis title at the 2023 Italian Open after Anhelina Kalinina retired from the final with the scoreline at 6–4, 1–0. It was Rybakina's second career WTA 1000 title. Rybakina won three of her six matches at the tournament via retirement: over Anna Kalinskaya in the third round, Iga Świątek in the quarterfinals, and Kalinina in the final. With the win, Rybakina entered the top five in the WTA rankings for the first time at world No. 4.

Świątek was the two-time defending champion, but retired in the quarterfinals against Rybakina due to a hip injury. Świątek was attempting to be the first woman to win three consecutive titles in Rome since Conchita Martínez in 1995.

== Seeds ==
All seeds received a bye into the second round.

1. (Poland) Iga Świątek (quarterfinals, retired)
2. Aryna Sabalenka (second round)
3. (United States) Jessica Pegula (second round)
4. (Tunisia) Ons Jabeur (second round)
5. (France) Caroline Garcia (third round)
6. (United States) Coco Gauff (third round)
7. (Kazakhstan) Elena Rybakina (champion)
8. Daria Kasatkina (fourth round)
9. (Greece) Maria Sakkari (third round)
10. (Czech Republic) Barbora Krejčíková (third round)
11. Veronika Kudermetova (semifinals)
12. (Brazil) Beatriz Haddad Maia (quarterfinals)
13. (Czech Republic) Karolína Plíšková (second round)
14. Victoria Azarenka (third round, withdrew)
15. Ekaterina Alexandrova (second round)
16. Liudmila Samsonova (third round)
17. (Poland) Magda Linette (third round)
18. (Italy) Martina Trevisan (second round)
19. (United States) Madison Keys (fourth round)
20. (Latvia) Jeļena Ostapenko (semifinals)
21. (Croatia) Donna Vekić (fourth round)
22. (China) Zheng Qinwen (quarterfinals)
23. Anastasia Potapova (third round)
24. (Canada) Bianca Andreescu (second round)
25. (Belgium) Elise Mertens (second round)
26. (Switzerland) Jil Teichmann (second round)
27. (Czech Republic) Marie Bouzková (fourth round)
28. (United States) Bernarda Pera (second round)
29. (Croatia) Petra Martić (second round)
30. (Ukraine) Anhelina Kalinina (final, retired)
31. (Romania) Irina-Camelia Begu (second round)
32. (Ukraine) Marta Kostyuk (third round)

Click on the seed number of a player to go to their draw section.

== Draw ==
Key

- Q = Qualifier
- WC = Wild card
- LL = Lucky loser
- Alt = Alternate
- ITF = ITF entry
- PR = Protected ranking
- SR = Special ranking
- SE = Special exempt
- JE = Junior exempt
- JR = Junior Accelerator Programme entrant
- CO = College Accelerator Programme entrant
- NG = Next Gen Accelerator Program entrant
- w/o = Walkover
- r = Retired
- d = Defaulted

=== Finals ===
Quarterfinals
1	(Poland) Iga Świątek	6	6^{3}	2^{r}
7	(Kazakhstan) Elena Rybakina	2	7^{7}	2
(Spain) Paula Badosa	2	6	3
20	(Latvia) Jeļena Ostapenko	6	4	6
11	Veronika Kudermetova	3	6	6
22	(China) Zheng Qinwen	6	3	4
12	(Brazil) Beatriz Haddad Maia	7^{7}	6^{6}	3
30	(Ukraine) Anhelina Kalinina	6^{2}	7^{8}	6

Semifinals
7	(Kazakhstan) Elena Rybakina	6	6
20	(Latvia) Jeļena Ostapenko	2	4
11	Veronika Kudermetova	5	7	2
30	(Ukraine) Anhelina Kalinina	7	5	6

Final
7	(Kazakhstan) Elena Rybakina	6	1
30	(Ukraine) Anhelina Kalinina	4	0^{r}

=== Top half ===
==== Section 1 ====
First round
PR	A Pavlyuchenkova	6	6
WC	(Italy) S Errani	1	1
(Ukraine) L Tsurenko	6	6
PR	(Ukraine) E Svitolina	4	3
A Sasnovich	7^{7}	4	6
(Canada) L Fernandez	6^{4}	6	3
(United States) A Parks	1	1
(Estonia) A Kontaveit	6	6

Second round
1	(Poland) I Świątek	6	6
PR	A Pavlyuchenkova	0	0
(Ukraine) L Tsurenko	6	6
28	(United States) B Pera	4	4
21	(Croatia) D Vekić	3	6	6
A Sasnovich	6	3	3
(Estonia) A Kontaveit	3	3
16	L Samsonova	6	6

Third round
1	(Poland) I Świątek	6	6
(Ukraine) L Tsurenko	2	0
21	(Croatia) D Vekić	2	7^{7}	6
16	L Samsonova	6	6^{5}	2

Fourth round
1	(Poland) I Świątek	6	6
21	(Croatia) D Vekić	3	4

==== Section 2 ====
First round
PR	(Czech Republic) B Strýcová	6	3	6
(Belgium) M Zanevska	1	6	3
(Estonia) K Kanepi	0	6	2
PR	(Czech Republic) M Vondroušová	6	4	6
Q	(Ukraine) D Yastremska	4	2
A Kalinskaya	6	6
(Italy) J Paolini	6	6^{3}	6
(China) Xin Wang	4	7^{7}	2

Second round
9	(Greece) M Sakkari	6	6
PR	(Czech Republic) B Strýcová	1	3
PR	(Czech Republic) M Vondroušová	6	6
24	(Canada) B Andreescu	0	1
25	(Belgium) E Mertens	4	6	3
A Kalinskaya	6	4	6
(Italy) J Paolini	6^{4}	1
7	(Kazakhstan) E Rybakina	7^{7}	6

Third round
9	(Greece) M Sakkari	5	3
PR	(Czech Republic) M Vondroušová	7	6
A Kalinskaya	3^{r}
7	(Kazakhstan) E Rybakina	4

Fourth round
PR	(Czech Republic) M Vondroušová	3	3
7	(Kazakhstan) E Rybakina	6	6

==== Section 3 ====
First round
(Spain) P Badosa	4	6	7^{7}
Q	(Germany) A-L Friedsam	6	2	6^{2}
WC	(Italy) C Rosatello	7^{11}	2	2
(United States) C Liu	6^{9}	6	6
LL	K Rakhimova	4	5
(Czech Republic) K Muchová	6	7
Q	(Netherlands) A Rus	6	2	3
(Italy) C Giorgi	4	6	6

Second round
4	(Tunisia) O Jabeur	1	4
(Spain) P Badosa	6	6
(United States) C Liu	0	4
32	(Ukraine) M Kostyuk	6	6
18	(Italy) M Trevisan	6	3	5
(Czech Republic) K Muchová	3	6	7
(Italy) C Giorgi	6	6
15	E Alexandrova	4	2

Third round
(Spain) P Badosa	6	6
32	(Ukraine) M Kostyuk	4	2
(Czech Republic) K Muchová	7^{7}	6
(Italy) C Giorgi	6^{4}	2

Fourth round
(Spain) P Badosa	6	6^{4}	6
(Czech Republic) K Muchová	4	7^{7}	2

==== Section 4 ====
First round
(Italy) L Bronzetti	3	6	3
(Montenegro) D Kovinić	6	3	6
(United States) K Volynets	6	3	4
(Romania) S Cîrstea	2	6	6
WC	(Italy) N Brancaccio	4	6	2
(Austria) J Grabher	6	3	6
WC	(Italy) D Cherubini	5	6	3
WC	(Italy) L Pigato	7	2	6

Second round
10	(Czech Republic) B Krejčíková	6	4
(Montenegro) D Kovinić	2	1^{r}
(Romania) S Cîrstea	3	6	2
20	(Latvia) J Ostapenko	6	3	6
26	(Switzerland) J Teichmann	6^{4}	7	3
(Austria) J Grabher	7^{7}	5	6
WC	(Italy) L Pigato	1	2
8	D Kasatkina	6	6

Third round
10	(Czech Republic) B Krejčíková	6^{2}	0
20	(Latvia) J Ostapenko	7^{7}	6
(Austria) J Grabher	5	6	6^{2}
8	D Kasatkina	7	4	7^{7}

Fourth round
20	(Latvia) J Ostapenko	6	4	6
8	D Kasatkina	4	6	0

=== Bottom half ===
==== Section 5 ====
First round
(Kazakhstan) Y Putintseva	6^{5}	7^{7}	6
Q	(Bulgaria) V Tomova	7^{7}	6^{3}	0
(United States) C McNally	6	6
WC	(Italy) D Spiteri	0	1
(Italy) E Cocciaretto	6	6
(United States) L Davis	3	0
(Germany) J Niemeier	6	4	2
(Spain) N Párrizas Díaz	4	6	6

Second round
6	(United States) C Gauff	6	6
(Kazakhstan) Y Putintseva	0	1
(United States) C McNally	4	3
27	(Czech Republic) M Bouzková	6	6
23	A Potapova	6	6
(Italy) E Cocciaretto	4	4
(Spain) N Párrizas Díaz	5	2
11	V Kudermetova	7	6

Third round
6	(United States) C Gauff	6	2	2
27	(Czech Republic) M Bouzková	4	6	6
23	A Potapova	5	6	1
11	V Kudermetova	7	3	6

Fourth round
27	(Czech Republic) M Bouzková	2	2
11	V Kudermetova	6	6

==== Section 6 ====
First round
(Germany) T Maria	4	1
Q	(Hungary) A Bondár	6	6
Q	(Czech Republic) T Martincová	6^{2}	4
(France) A Cornet	7^{7}	6
(China) Xiy Wang	7^{7}	7^{7}
WC	(Italy) L Stefanini	6^{2}	6^{2}
Q	(United States) T Townsend	4	6	7
Q	(Belgium) Y Bonaventure	6	1	5

Second round
13	(Czech Republic) Ka Plíšková	6^{5}	2
Q	(Hungary) A Bondár	7^{7}	6
(France) A Cornet	3	6^{2}
22	(China) Q Zheng	6	7^{7}
31	(Romania) I-C Begu	4	5
(China) Xiy Wang	6	7
Q	(United States) T Townsend	6	3	6
3	(United States) J Pegula	2	6	3

Third round
Q	(Hungary) A Bondár	6^{2}	4
22	(China) Q Zheng	7^{7}	6
(China) Xiy Wang	6	0	7
Q	(United States) T Townsend	2	6	5

Fourth round
22	(China) Q Zheng	6	3	6
(China) Xiy Wang	4	6	1

==== Section 7 ====
First round
(Romania) A Bogdan	7	6
Q	(Japan) N Hibino	5	0
V Gracheva	6^{4}	6	6^{4}
Q	(Colombia) C Osorio	7^{7}	1	7^{7}
(Czech Republic) L Nosková	4	6	6
(United States) S Rogers	6	1	4
Q	(Romania) E-G Ruse	6	6
(Czech Republic) L Fruhvirtová	1	0

Second round
5	(France) C Garcia	6	3	7
(Romania) A Bogdan	4	6	5
Q	(Colombia) C Osorio	6	6
29	(Croatia) P Martić	4	2
17	(Poland) M Linette	7^{7}	6
(Czech Republic) L Nosková	6^{4}	1
Q	(Romania) E-G Ruse	2	3
12	(Brazil) B Haddad Maia	6	6

Third round
5	(France) C Garcia	4	4
Q	(Colombia) C Osorio	6	6
17	(Poland) M Linette	5	4
12	(Brazil) B Haddad Maia	7	6

Fourth round
Q	(Colombia) C Osorio	3	3
12	(Brazil) B Haddad Maia	6	6

==== Section 8 ====
First round
(United States) S Stephens	6	6
PR	(Argentina) N Podoroska	4	1
WC	(Italy) M Paoletti	6	2	5
Q	(Poland) M Fręch	4	6	7
(Egypt) M Sherif	6	2	3
A Blinkova	2	6	6
PR	(United States) S Kenin	6	6^{8}	7
(Spain) C Bucșa	3	7^{10}	5

Second round
14	V Azarenka	6	6
(United States) S Stephens	4	3
Q	(Poland) M Fręch	3	2
19	(United States) M Keys	6	6
30	(Ukraine) A Kalinina	6	6
A Blinkova	2	2
PR	(United States) S Kenin	7^{7}	6
2	A Sabalenka	6^{4}	2

Third round
14	V Azarenka
19	(United States) M Keys	w/o
30	(Ukraine) A Kalinina	6	6
PR	(United States) S Kenin	4	2

Fourth round
19	(United States) M Keys	6	2	4
30	(Ukraine) A Kalinina	2	6	6

== Seeded players ==
The following are the seeded players. Seedings are based on WTA rankings as of 24 April 2023. Rankings and points before are as of 8 May 2023.

Because the women's tournament is being expanded to two weeks this year, players are defending points from the 2022 Italian Open, as well as tournaments that took place during the week of 16 May 2022 (Rabat and Strasbourg). Points from the 2022 Italian Open are listed first in the "Points defending" column.

The event is not mandatory on the women's side and points from the 2022 Italian Open are included in the table below only if they counted towards the player's ranking as of 8 May 2023. For other players, the points defending column shows the lower of (a) points from the player's second-highest non-mandatory WTA 1000 tournament (which are required to be counted in her ranking) or (b) her 16th best result.

Points defending will be replaced at the end of the tournament by the highest of (a) the player's points from the 2023 tournament, (b) her 17th best result, or (c) points from her second-highest non-mandatory WTA 1000 event.

Seed	Rank	Player	Points before	Points defending	Points earned	Points after	Status
1	1	(Poland) Iga Świątek	9,625	900	215	8,940	Quarterfinals retired against (Kazakhstan) Elena Rybakina [7]
2	2	Aryna Sabalenka	7,881	350	10	7,541	Second round lost to (United States) Sofia Kenin [PR]
3	3	(United States) Jessica Pegula	5,300	105	10	5,205	Second round lost to (United States) Taylor Townsend [Q]
4	7	(Tunisia) Ons Jabeur	4,116	585	10	3,541	Second round lost to (Spain) Paula Badosa
5	4	(France) Caroline Garcia	5,025	(100)^{†}	65	5,025^{&}	Third round lost to (Colombia) Camila Osorio [Q]
6	5	(United States) Coco Gauff	4,345	105	65	4,305	Third round lost to (Czech Republic) Marie Bouzková [27]
7	6	(Kazakhstan) Elena Rybakina	4,195	105	1000	5,090	Champion, defeated (Ukraine) Anhelina Kalinina [30]
8	9	Daria Kasatkina	3,505	350	120	3,275	Fourth round lost to (Latvia) Jeļena Ostapenko [20]
9	8	(Greece) Maria Sakkari	3,516	190	65	3,391	Third round lost to (Czech Republic) Markéta Vondroušová [PR]
10	13	(Czech Republic) Barbora Krejčíková	2,616	(1)^{‡}	65	2,680	Third round lost to (Latvia) Jeļena Ostapenko [20]
11	12	Veronika Kudermetova	2,660	(100)^{†}	390	2,950	Semifinals lost to (Ukraine) Anhelina Kalinina [30]
12	15	(Brazil) Beatriz Haddad Maia	2,206	(1)^{‡}	215	2,420	Quarterfinals lost to (Ukraine) Anhelina Kalinina [30]
13	14	(Czech Republic) Karolína Plíšková	2,245	110^{§}	(25)^{†}	2,160	Second round lost to (Hungary) Anna Bondár [Q]
14	17	Victoria Azarenka	2,127	105	65	2,087	Third round withdrew
15	22	Ekaterina Alexandrova	1,775	60	10^{‡}	1,725	Second round lost to (Italy) Camila Giorgi
16	16	Liudmila Samsonova	2,172	1	65	2,236	Third round lost to (Croatia) Donna Vekić [21]
17	19	(Poland) Magda Linette	1,820	60^{§}	65	1,825	Third round lost to (Brazil) Beatriz Haddad Maia [12]
18	18	(Italy) Martina Trevisan	1,878	280^{§}	10	1,608	Second round lost to (Czech Republic) Karolína Muchová
19	23	(United States) Madison Keys	1,742	1	120	1,861	Fourth round lost to (Ukraine) Anhelina Kalinina [30]
20	20	(Latvia) Jeļena Ostapenko	1,795	(55)^{†}	390	2,130	Semifinals lost to (Kazakhstan) Elena Rybakina [7]
21	24	(Croatia) Donna Vekić	1,713	(20)^{‡}	120	1,813	Fourth round lost to (Poland) Iga Świątek [1]
22	21	(China) Zheng Qinwen	1,784	(1)^{†}	215	1,998	Quarterfinals lost to Veronika Kudermetova [11]
23	25	Anastasia Potapova	1,601	(1)^{‡}	65	1,665	Third round lost to Veronika Kudermetova [11]
24	31	(Canada) Bianca Andreescu	1,322	190	10	1,142	Second round lost to (Czech Republic) Markéta Vondroušová [PR]
25	26	(Belgium) Elise Mertens	1,474	60^{§}	(25)^{†}	1,439	Second round lost to Anna Kalinskaya
26	58	(Switzerland) Jil Teichmann	948	190	10	768	Second round lost to (Austria) Julia Grabher
27	38	(Czech Republic) Marie Bouzková	1,213	(15)^{†}	120	1,318	Fourth round lost to Veronika Kudermetova [11]
28	32	(United States) Bernarda Pera	1,315	(1)^{‡}+(95+30)^{^}	10+25+13	1,237	Second round lost to (Ukraine) Lesia Tsurenko
29	28	(Croatia) Petra Martić	1,395	135	10	1,270	Second round lost to (Colombia) Camila Osorio [Q]
30	47	(Ukraine) Anhelina Kalinina	1,067	60	650	1,657	Runner-up, retired against (Kazakhstan) Elena Rybakina [7]
31	27	(Romania) Irina-Camelia Begu	1,443	(1)^{†}	10	1,452	Second round lost to (China) Wang Xiyu
32	40	(Ukraine) Marta Kostyuk	1,190	30	65	1,225	Third round lost to (Spain) Paula Badosa

† Points from the player's 16th best result (for points defending) or 17th best result (for points earned), in each case as of 8 May 2023.
‡ Points from the player's second-best non-mandatory WTA 1000 event, which are required to be counted in her ranking.
§ The player is only defending points from Rabat or Strasbourg.
^ The player is defending points from Karlsruhe (WTA 125 tournament) and Strasbourg.
& No change in points because points from this tournament did not count as one of the player's 16 best results.

=== Withdrawn players ===
The following players would have been seeded, but withdrew before the tournament began.

Rank	Player	Points before	Points dropped	Points after	Withdrawal reason
10	(Czech Republic) Petra Kvitová	3,162	(1) ^{†}	3,162	Right foot injury
11	(Switzerland) Belinda Bencic	2,750	60 ^{†}	2,750	Hip injury
29	(China) Zhang Shuai	1,385	60 ^{†}	1,355	Not given

† Points dropped were replaced with points from the player's next best result.

== Other entry information ==
=== Wildcards ===
- (Italy) Nuria Brancaccio
- (Italy) Diletta Cherubini
- (Italy) Sara Errani
- (Italy) Matilde Paoletti
- (Italy) Lisa Pigato
- (Italy) Camilla Rosatello
- (Italy) Dalila Spiteri
- (Italy) Lucrezia Stefanini

=== Protected ranking ===
- (United States) Sofia Kenin
- Anastasia Pavlyuchenkova
- (Argentina) Nadia Podoroska
- (Czech Republic) Barbora Strýcová
- (Ukraine) Elina Svitolina
- (Czech Republic) Markéta Vondroušová

=== Withdrawals ===
- & (United States) Amanda Anisimova → replaced by (Belgium) Maryna Zanevska
- & (Switzerland) Belinda Bencic → replaced by (Germany) Tatjana Maria
- & (United States) Danielle Collins → replaced by (Ukraine) Lesia Tsurenko
- † (Romania) Simona Halep → replaced by (Estonia) Anett Kontaveit
- & (Czech Republic) Petra Kvitová → replaced by (Italy) Lucia Bronzetti
- & (United Kingdom) Emma Raducanu → replaced by (Montenegro) Danka Kovinić
- & (Czech Republic) Kateřina Siniaková → replaced by (Spain) Cristina Bucșa
- † (Australia) Ajla Tomljanović → replaced by (France) Alizé Cornet
- & (Romania) Patricia Maria Țig → replaced by (Spain) Nuria Párrizas Díaz
- & (China) Zhang Shuai → replaced by (United States) Katie Volynets
- & (China) Zhu Lin → replaced by Kamilla Rakhimova

† – not included on entry list
& – withdrew from entry list

== Qualifying ==
=== Seeds ===
1. (Bulgaria) Viktoriya Tomova (qualified)
2. (Spain) Rebeka Masarova (qualifying competition)
3. (Belgium) Ysaline Bonaventure (qualified)
4. (Germany) Anna-Lena Friedsam (qualified)
5. (Hungary) Anna Bondár (qualified)
6. Kamilla Rakhimova (qualifying competition, lucky loser)
7. (Hungary) Dalma Gálfi (qualifying competition)
8. (Czech Republic) Tereza Martincová (qualified)
9. (France) Océane Dodin (qualifying competition)
10. (Poland) Magdalena Fręch (qualified)
11. (Netherlands) Arantxa Rus (qualified)
12. (Japan) Nao Hibino (qualified)
13. (Australia) Kimberly Birrell (first round)
14. Erika Andreeva (first round)
15. (Colombia) Camila Osorio (qualified)
16. (Spain) Marina Bassols Ribera (qualifying competition)
17. (United States) Taylor Townsend (qualified)
18. (Brazil) Laura Pigossi (first round)
19. (Spain) Aliona Bolsova (qualifying competition)
20. (Switzerland) Simona Waltert (qualifying competition)
21. (Serbia) Olga Danilović (first round)
22. (France) Léolia Jeanjean (first round, retired)
23. (Canada) Katherine Sebov (first round)
24. (United Kingdom) Harriet Dart (first round)

=== Qualifiers ===
1. (Bulgaria) Viktoriya Tomova
2. (Ukraine) Dayana Yastremska
3. (Belgium) Ysaline Bonaventure
4. (Germany) Anna-Lena Friedsam
5. (Hungary) Anna Bondár
6. (Romania) Elena-Gabriela Ruse
7. (United States) Taylor Townsend
8. (Czech Republic) Tereza Martincová
9. (Colombia) Camila Osorio
10. (Poland) Magdalena Fręch
11. (Netherlands) Arantxa Rus
12. (Japan) Nao Hibino

=== Lucky loser ===
1. Kamilla Rakhimova

=== Qualifying draw ===
==== First qualifier ====
First round
1	(Bulgaria) Viktoriya Tomova	7	6
(United States) Sachia Vickery	5	4
WC	(Italy) Jessica Bertoldo	0	2
19	(Spain) Aliona Bolsova	6	6

Qualifying competition
1	(Bulgaria) Viktoriya Tomova	6	6
19	(Spain) Aliona Bolsova	4	1

==== Second qualifier ====
First round
2	(Spain) Rebeka Masarova	6	6
(Australia) Olivia Gadecki	1	3
(Ukraine) Dayana Yastremska	7	0
22	(France) Léolia Jeanjean	5	0^{r}

Qualifying competition
2	(Spain) Rebeka Masarova	3	2
(Ukraine) Dayana Yastremska	6	6

==== Third qualifier ====
First round
3	(Belgium) Ysaline Bonaventure	6	6
WC	(Italy) Angelica Moratelli	2	2
(Australia) Priscilla Hon	1	6	6
24	(United Kingdom) Harriet Dart	6	2	2

Qualifying competition
3	(Belgium) Ysaline Bonaventure	6	6
(Australia) Priscilla Hon	4	4

==== Fourth qualifier ====
First round
4	(Germany) Anna-Lena Friedsam	7^{7}	6
(Japan) Moyuka Uchijima	6^{5}	3
WC	(Italy) Martina Colmegna	2	0
20	(Switzerland) Simona Waltert	6	6

Qualifying competition
4	(Germany) Anna-Lena Friedsam	7	6
20	(Switzerland) Simona Waltert	5	3

==== Fifth qualifier ====
First round
5	(Hungary) Anna Bondár	6	6
(France) Amandine Hesse	1	3
(United States) Katrina Scott	6	4	3
16	(Spain) Marina Bassols Ribera	1	6	6

Qualifying competition
5	(Hungary) Anna Bondár	6	6^{6}	6
16	(Spain) Marina Bassols Ribera	0	7^{8}	3

==== Sixth qualifier ====
First round
6	Kamilla Rakhimova	6	6
(United States) Elizabeth Mandlik	2	1
(Romania) Elena-Gabriela Ruse	6	6
18	(Brazil) Laura Pigossi	1	2

Qualifying competition
6	Kamilla Rakhimova	7^{8}	3	3
(Romania) Elena-Gabriela Ruse	6^{6}	6	6

==== Seventh qualifier ====
First round
7	(Hungary) Dalma Gálfi	7^{7}	6
PR	(Canada) Eugenie Bouchard	6^{4}	3
(Sweden) Mirjam Björklund	2	3
17	(United States) Taylor Townsend	6	6

Qualifying competition
7	(Hungary) Dalma Gálfi	5	4
17	(United States) Taylor Townsend	7	6

==== Eighth qualifier ====
First round
8	(Czech Republic) Tereza Martincová	7^{7}	7^{7}
(Australia) Jaimee Fourlis	6^{4}	6^{5}
(Croatia) Ana Konjuh	6	7
21	(Serbia) Olga Danilović	2	5

Qualifying competition
8	(Czech Republic) Tereza Martincová	6	2	6
(Croatia) Ana Konjuh	4	6	3

==== Ninth qualifier ====
First round
9	(France) Océane Dodin	6	6
WC	(Italy) Anna Turati	2	2
WC	(Italy) Deborah Chiesa	3	1
15	(Colombia) Camila Osorio	6	6

Qualifying competition
9	(France) Océane Dodin	3	4
15	(Colombia) Camila Osorio	6	6

==== Tenth qualifier ====
First round
10	(Poland) Magdalena Fręch	7^{11}	6
WC	(Italy) Federica Urgesi	6^{9}	0
Polina Kudermetova	6	6
23	(Canada) Katherine Sebov	4	3

Qualifying competition
10	(Poland) Magdalena Fręch	6	6
Polina Kudermetova	1	2

==== Eleventh qualifier ====
First round
11	(Netherlands) Arantxa Rus	6	6
(Greece) Despina Papamichail	2	1
(France) Elsa Jacquemot	6	6
14	Erika Andreeva	2	1

Qualifying competition
11	(Netherlands) Arantxa Rus	6	6
(France) Elsa Jacquemot	1	3

==== Twelfth qualifier ====
First round
12	(Japan) Nao Hibino	6	1
(France) Kristina Mladenovic	2	0^{r}
(Czech Republic) Sára Bejlek	6	6
13	(Australia) Kimberly Birrell	1	2

Qualifying competition
12	(Japan) Nao Hibino	3	7^{7}	6
(Czech Republic) Sára Bejlek	6	6^{1}	2
