= 2025 Guadalajara Open Akron – Singles =

Singles
- 2025 Guadalajara Open Akron

Final
- Champion: (United States) Iva Jovic
- Runner-up: (Colombia) Emiliana Arango
- Score: 6–4, 6–1

Details
- Draw: 28 (6 Q / 4 WC )
- Seeds: 8

Events
Singles	Doubles
- Guadalajara Open Akron

Iva Jovic defeated Emiliana Arango in the final, 6–4, 6–1 to win the singles tennis title at the 2025 Guadalajara Open. It was her first WTA Tour title. She saved a match point en route to the title, in the quarterfinals against Victoria Jiménez Kasintseva. Jovic became the youngest American to win a tour-level title since Coco Gauff in 2021, and the youngest WTA 500 winner since Martina Hingis in 1998 (when the category was called Tier II).

Magdalena Fręch was the defending champion, but lost in the quarterfinals to Nikola Bartůňková.

== Seeds ==
The top four seeds received a bye into the second round.

1. (Belgium) Elise Mertens (second round)
2. Veronika Kudermetova (second round)
3. (Latvia) Jeļena Ostapenko (second round)
4. (Poland) Magdalena Fręch (quarterfinals)
5. (Poland) Magda Linette (first round, retired)
6. (Germany) Tatjana Maria (quarterfinals)
7. (United States) Alycia Parks (first round)
8. (Colombia) Camila Osorio (second round)

== Draw ==
Key

- Q = Qualifier
- WC = Wild card
- LL = Lucky loser
- Alt = Alternate
- ITF = ITF entry
- PR = Protected ranking
- SR = Special ranking
- SE = Special exempt
- JE = Junior exempt
- JR = Junior Accelerator Programme entrant
- CO = College Accelerator Programme entrant
- NG = Next Gen Accelerator Program entrant
- w/o = Walkover
- r = Retired
- d = Defaulted

=== Finals ===
Semifinals
(France) Elsa Jacquemot	4	5
(Colombia) Emiliana Arango	6	7
WC	(Czech Republic) Nikola Bartůňková	3	7^{7}	3
(United States) Iva Jovic	6	6^{5}	6

Final
(Colombia) Emiliana Arango	4	1
(United States) Iva Jovic	6	6

=== Top half ===
First round
(Greece) M Sakkari	2	0
(France) E Jacquemot	6	6
WC	(Italy) M Trevisan	2	3
(Canada) R Marino	6	6
(Turkey) Z Sönmez	4	2
6	(Germany) T Maria	6	6
P Kudermetova	6	5	4
Q	(Canada) M Stakusic	3	7	6
WC	(Australia) S Hunter	7^{7}	4	6
(Czech Republic) K Siniaková	6^{5}	6	3
(Colombia) E Arango	6	0
5	(Poland) M Linette	0	0^{r}

Second round
1	(Belgium) E Mertens	6	3	4
(France) E Jacquemot	4	6	6
(Canada) R Marino	3	5
6	(Germany) T Maria	6	7
3	(Latvia) J Ostapenko	4	7^{8}	2
Q	(Canada) M Stakusic	6	6^{6}	6
WC	(Australia) S Hunter	2	2
(Colombia) E Arango	6	6

Quarterfinals
(France) E Jacquemot	3	6	6
6	(Germany) T Maria	6	4	4
Q	(Canada) M Stakusic	2	3
(Colombia) E Arango	6	6

Semifinals
(France) E Jacquemot	4	5
(Colombia) E Arango	6	7

=== Bottom half ===
First round
7	(United States) A Parks	2	4
Q	(Czech Republic) D Vidmanová	6	6
WC	(Czech Republic) N Bartůňková	6	6
Q	(Italy) N Fossa Huergo	4	2
WC	(United States) S Stephens	4	6	1
Q	(Italy) L Stefanini	6	4	6
8	(Colombia) C Osorio	7	7
K Rakhimova	5	5
(Poland) K Kawa	4	6	3
(United States) I Jovic	6	4	6
Q	(Andorra) V Jiménez Kasintseva	6	6
Q	E Pridankina	4	3

Second round
Q	(Czech Republic) D Vidmanová	3	2
WC	(Czech Republic) N Bartůňková	6	6
Q	(Italy) L Stefanini	1	6^{6}
4	(Poland) M Fręch	6	7^{8}
8	(Colombia) C Osorio	4	2
(United States) I Jovic	6	6
Q	(Andorra) V Jiménez Kasintseva	6	6
2	V Kudermetova	4	2

Quarterfinals
WC	(Czech Republic) N Bartůňková	7	6
4	(Poland) M Fręch	5	4
(United States) I Jovic	6	3	7^{8}
Q	(Andorra) V Jiménez Kasintseva	3	6	6^{6}

Semifinals
WC	(Czech Republic) N Bartůňková	3	7^{7}	3
(United States) I Jovic	6	6^{5}	6

== Qualifying ==
=== Seeds ===
1. (United States) Varvara Lepchenko (first round)
2. (Japan) Ena Shibahara (qualifying competition)
3. (Andorra) Victoria Jiménez Kasintseva (qualified)
4. (Australia) Maddison Inglis (qualifying competition, retired)
5. (Italy) Lucrezia Stefanini (qualified)
6. (Canada) Marina Stakusic (qualified)
7. (Czech Republic) Darja Vidmanová (qualified)
8. Iryna Shymanovich (qualifying competition)
9. (United States) Hina Inoue (first round)
10. (Canada) Cadence Brace (qualifying competition)
11. Elena Pridankina (qualified)
12. (Italy) Nicole Fossa Huergo (qualified)

=== Qualifiers ===
1. Elena Pridankina
2. (Czech Republic) Darja Vidmanová
3. (Andorra) Victoria Jiménez Kasintseva
4. (Italy) Nicole Fossa Huergo
5. (Italy) Lucrezia Stefanini
6. (Canada) Marina Stakusic

=== Qualifying draw ===
==== First qualifier ====
First round
1	(United States) Varvara Lepchenko	6	4	3
(United States) Alana Smith	4	6	6
WC	(Mexico) Abril Cardenas Olivares	1	1
11	Elena Pridankina	6	6

Qualifying competition
(United States) Alana Smith	5	6	2
11	Elena Pridankina	7	4	6

==== Second qualifier ====
First round
2	(Japan) Ena Shibahara	6	6
WC	(Mexico) Natalia Sousa Salazar	2	1
(United States) Emina Bektas	2	1
7	(Czech Republic) Darja Vidmanová	6	6

Qualifying competition
2	(Japan) Ena Shibahara	3	5
7	(Czech Republic) Darja Vidmanová	6	7

==== Third qualifier ====
First round
3	(Andorra) Victoria Jiménez Kasintseva	6	6
WC	(Mexico) María Fernanda Navarro Oliva	3	4
(Poland) Martyna Kubka	6	1	2
10	(Canada) Cadence Brace	1	6	6

Qualifying competition
3	(Andorra) Victoria Jiménez Kasintseva	6	6
10	(Canada) Cadence Brace	4	1

==== Fourth qualifier ====
First round
4	(Australia) Maddison Inglis	6	5	6
(United States) Vivian Wolff	1	7	2
WC	(Mexico) Marianne Ángel González	0	3
12	(Italy) Nicole Fossa Huergo	6	6

Qualifying competition
4	(Australia) Maddison Inglis	7	0^{r}
12	(Italy) Nicole Fossa Huergo	5	0

==== Fifth qualifier ====
First round
5	(Italy) Lucrezia Stefanini	6	6
(United States) Sachia Vickery	4	4
(Finland) Anastasia Kulikova	2	7^{7}	6
9	(United States) Hina Inoue	6	6^{5}	4

Qualifying competition
5	(Italy) Lucrezia Stefanini	6	6
(Finland) Anastasia Kulikova	1	4

==== Sixth qualifier ====
First round
6	(Canada) Marina Stakusic	7	7
(France) Amandine Hesse	5	5
Alt	(United States) Nicole Melichar-Martinez	4	6^{3}
8	Iryna Shymanovich	6	7^{7}

Qualifying competition
6	(Canada) Marina Stakusic	4	6	7^{7}
8	Iryna Shymanovich	6	3	6^{4}
