= 2022 Grand Prix SAR La Princesse Lalla Meryem – Doubles =

Doubles
- 2022 Grand Prix SAR La Princesse Lalla Meryem

Final
- Champions: (Japan) Eri Hozumi (Japan) Makoto Ninomiya
- Runners-up: (Romania) Monica Niculescu; Alexandra Panova
- Score: 6–7^{(7–9)}, 6–3, [10–8]

Events
Singles	Doubles
- Morocco Open

Eri Hozumi and Makoto Ninomiya defeated Monica Niculescu and Alexandra Panova in the final, 6–7^{(7–9)}, 6–3, [10–8] to win the doubles tennis title at the 2022 Morocco Open.

María José Martínez Sánchez and Sara Sorribes Tormo were the defending champions from when the tournament was last held in 2019, but Martínez Sánchez retired from tennis in 2020, and Sorribes Tormo chose not to participate.

== Seeds ==
1. (Japan) Eri Hozumi / (Japan) Makoto Ninomiya (champions)
2. (Romania) Monica Niculescu / Alexandra Panova (final)
3. Natela Dzalamidze / Kamilla Rakhimova (first round)
4. (France) Kristina Mladenovic / (Japan) Ena Shibahara (withdrew)
5. (Norway) Ulrikke Eikeri / (United States) Catherine Harrison (first round)

== Draw ==
Key

- Q = Qualifier
- WC = Wild card
- LL = Lucky loser
- Alt = Alternate
- ITF = ITF entry
- PR = Protected ranking
- SR = Special ranking
- SE = Special exempt
- JE = Junior exempt
- JR = Junior Accelerator Programme entrant
- CO = College Accelerator Programme entrant
- NG = Next Gen Accelerator Program entrant
- w/o = Walkover
- r = Retired
- d = Defaulted

=== Draw ===
First Round
1	(Japan) E Hozumi (Japan) M Ninomiya	6	6
(Georgia (country)) O Kalashnikova (Japan) M Kato	2	4
A Anshba (Hungary) P Udvardy	6^{8}	5
(Netherlands) A Rus (Egypt) M Sherif	7^{10}	7
3	N Dzalamidze; K Rakhimova	6	6^{5}	[3]
E Yashina (Mexico) M Zacarías	0	7^{7}	[10]
(Poland) P Kania-Choduń (United Kingdom) T Moore	6	6
(France) C Burel (France) K Mladenovic	2	4
(Brazil) I Gamarra Martins (United Kingdom) E Webley-Smith	7	7^{13}
(Spain) I Burillo Escorihuela (Spain) Y Cavallé Reimers	5	6^{11}
(Czech Republic) A Dețiuc; Y Sizikova	6	6
5	(Norway) U Eikeri (United States) C Harrison	2	3
(Kazakhstan) A Danilina (United States) I Neel	6	6
WC	(Morocco) Y Kabbaj; E Kazionova	1	2
(United Kingdom) A Barnett (United Kingdom) O Nicholls	1	5
2	(Romania) M Niculescu; A Panova	6	7

Quarterfinals
1	(Japan) E Hozumi (Japan) M Ninomiya	w/o
(Netherlands) A Rus (Egypt) M Sherif
E Yashina (Mexico) M Zacarías	6	2	[15]
(Poland) P Kania-Choduń (United Kingdom) T Moore	2	6	[13]
(Brazil) I Gamarra Martins (United Kingdom) E Webley-Smith	6	6
(Czech Republic) A Dețiuc; Y Sizikova	4	4
(Kazakhstan) A Danilina (United States) I Neel	2	2
2	(Romania) M Niculescu; A Panova	6	6

Semifinals
1	(Japan) E Hozumi (Japan) M Ninomiya	6	6
E Yashina (Mexico) M Zacarías	2	2
(Brazil) I Gamarra Martins (United Kingdom) E Webley-Smith	2	1
2	(Romania) M Niculescu; A Panova	6	6

Final
1	(Japan) E Hozumi (Japan) M Ninomiya	6^{7}	6	[10]
2	(Romania) M Niculescu; A Panova	7^{9}	3	[8]
