= 2023 Guadalajara Open Akron – Doubles =

Doubles
- 2023 Guadalajara Open Akron

Final
- Champions: (Australia) Storm Hunter (Belgium) Elise Mertens
- Runners-up: (Canada) Gabriela Dabrowski (New Zealand) Erin Routliffe
- Score: 3–6, 6–2, [10–4]

Details
- Draw: 28 (3WC)
- Seeds: 8

Events
Singles	Doubles
← 2022 ·	Guadalajara Open Akron	· 2024 →

Defending champion Storm Hunter and her partner Elise Mertens defeated Gabriela Dabrowski and Erin Routliffe in the final, 3–6, 6–2, [10–4] to win the doubles title at the 2023 Guadalajara Open Akron. Mertens reclaimed the WTA No. 1 doubles ranking by reaching the semifinals.

Hunter and Luisa Stefani were the reigning champions, but played separately this year. Stefani partnered Giuliana Olmos, but lost in the first round to Veronika Kudermetova and Anastasia Potapova.

== Seeds ==
The top four seeds received a bye into the second round.

1. (Australia) Storm Hunter / (Belgium) Elise Mertens (champions)
2. (Canada) Leylah Fernandez / (United States) Taylor Townsend (quarterfinals)
3. (Canada) Gabriela Dabrowski / (New Zealand) Erin Routliffe (final)
4. (Japan) Shuko Aoyama / (Japan) Ena Shibahara (second round)
5. (Mexico) Giuliana Olmos / (Brazil) Luisa Stefani (first round)
6. (United States) Nicole Melichar-Martinez / (Australia) Ellen Perez (first round)
7. (Kazakhstan) Anna Danilina / (China) Yang Zhaoxuan (first round)
8. (Japan) Miyu Kato / (Indonesia) Aldila Sutjiadi (quarterfinals)

== Draw ==
=== Key ===
- Q = Qualifier
- WC = Wild card
- LL = Lucky loser
- Alt = Alternate
- SE = Special exempt
- PR = Protected ranking
- ITF = ITF entry
- JE = Junior exempt
- w/o = Walkover
- r = Retired
- d = Defaulted
- SR = Special ranking

=== Finals ===
Semifinals
1	(Australia) Storm Hunter (Belgium) Elise Mertens	7	6
(United States) Caroline Dolehide (United States) Asia Muhammad	5	3
3	(Canada) Gabriela Dabrowski (New Zealand) Erin Routliffe	6	7^{7}
(Italy) Jasmine Paolini (Egypt) Mayar Sherif	2	6^{4}

Final
1	(Australia) Storm Hunter (Belgium) Elise Mertens	3	6	[10]
3	(Canada) Gabriela Dabrowski (New Zealand) Erin Routliffe	6	2	[4]

=== Top half ===
First round
(United States) B Mattek-Sands (France) K Mladenovic	1	7	[10]
(Georgia (country)) O Kalashnikova (Czech Republic) M Kolodziejová	6	5	[1]
(United States) L Davis (United States) R Montgomery	5	7^{7}	[10]
(Chile) A Guarachi (Romania) M Niculescu	7	6^{5}	[12]
V Kudermetova; A Potapova	6	3	[10]
5	(Mexico) G Olmos (Brazil) L Stefani	4	6	[7]
(Poland) M Fręch (Ukraine) D Yastremska	6^{4}	6^{7}
(United States) C Dolehide (United States) A Muhammad	7^{7}	7^{9}
(Brazil) I Gamarra Martins (United States) A Kulikov	6	6^{3}	[11]
Alt	(United States) A Rogers (Australia) O Tjandramulia	3	7^{7}	[9]
(Spain) C Bucșa; I Shymanovich	6	3	[5]
8	(Japan) M Kato (Indonesia) A Sutjiadi	2	6	[10]

Second round
1	(Australia) S Hunter (Belgium) E Mertens	6	6
(United States) B Mattek-Sands (France) K Mladenovic	2	2
(Chile) A Guarachi (Romania) M Niculescu	w/o
V Kudermetova; A Potapova
4	(Japan) S Aoyama (Japan) E Shibahara	7^{7}	5	[4]
(United States) C Dolehide (United States) A Muhammad	6^{4}	7	[10]
(Brazil) I Gamarra Martins (United States) A Kulikov
8	(Japan) M Kato (Indonesia) A Sutjiadi	w/o

Quarterfinals
1	(Australia) S Hunter (Belgium) E Mertens	6	6
(Chile) A Guarachi (Romania) M Niculescu	3	1
(United States) C Dolehide (United States) A Muhammad	6	6
8	(Japan) M Kato (Indonesia) A Sutjiadi	2	3

Semifinals
1	(Australia) S Hunter (Belgium) E Mertens	7	6
(United States) C Dolehide (United States) A Muhammad	5	3

=== Bottom half ===
First round
7	(Kazakhstan) A Danilina (China) Z Yang	6^{5}	6	[7]
(United States) A Parks (Belgium) Y Wickmayer	7^{7}	2	[10]
(Norway) U Eikeri (Estonia) I Neel	6	6
(Colombia) MP Pérez García (United States) S Sewing	2	2
(Ukraine) L Kichenok (Netherlands) A Rus	3	6	[10]
WC	V Miroshnichenko (Mexico) R Zarazúa	6	1	[4]
6	(United States) N Melichar-Martinez (Australia) E Perez	1	4
(Italy) J Paolini (Egypt) M Sherif	6	6
WC	(Canada) E Bouchard (Mexico) MF Navarro Oliva	4	6^{6}
(Slovakia) T Mihalíková (China) Y Xu	6	7^{8}
(United Kingdom) A Barnett (United Kingdom) O Nicholls	3	2
(Tunisia) O Jabeur (United States) P Stearns	6	6

Second round
(United States) A Parks (Belgium) Y Wickmayer	4	4
(Norway) U Eikeri (Estonia) I Neel	6	6
(Ukraine) L Kichenok (Netherlands) A Rus	3	6	[9]
3	(Canada) G Dabrowski (New Zealand) E Routliffe	6	4	[11]
(Italy) J Paolini (Egypt) M Sherif	6	6
(Slovakia) T Mihalíková (China) Y Xu	3	3
(Tunisia) O Jabeur (United States) P Stearns	4	4
2	(Canada) L Fernandez (United States) T Townsend	6	6

Quarterfinals
(Norway) U Eikeri (Estonia) I Neel	5	6	[7]
3	(Canada) G Dabrowski (New Zealand) E Routliffe	7	0	[10]
(Italy) J Paolini (Egypt) M Sherif	6	1	[10]
2	(Canada) L Fernandez (United States) T Townsend	3	6	[7]

Semifinals
3	(Canada) G Dabrowski (New Zealand) E Routliffe	6	7^{7}
(Italy) J Paolini (Egypt) M Sherif	2	6^{4}
