= 2026 Guadalajara Open – Singles =

Singles
- 2026 Guadalajara Open

Final
- Champion: (United States) Iva Jovic
- Runner-up: (United States) Peyton Stearns
- Score: 6–4, 6–2
- Date: 19 September 2026

Details
- Draw: 28 (4 Q / 4 WC )
- Seeds: 8

Events
Singles	Doubles
- Guadalajara Open

At the 2026 Guadalajara Open, defending champion Iva Jovic defeated Peyton Stearns in the final, 6–4, 6–2 to win the women's singles tennis title. The tournament was played on outdoor hard courts in Guadalajara, Mexico and was a WTA 500 level event. Jovic did not lose a set en route to her second WTA Tour title, and became the first player to successfully defend the Guadalajara Open title.

== Seeds ==
The top four seeds received a bye into the second round.

1. (Ukraine) Marta Kostyuk (quarterfinals)
2. (United States) Iva Jovic (champion)
3. (Czech Republic) Sára Bejlek (quarterfinals)
4. (France) Diane Parry (second round)
5. (Indonesia) Janice Tjen (second round)
6. (Spain) Cristina Bucșa (semifinals)
7. (Poland) Magdalena Fręch (quarterfinals)
8. Liudmila Samsonova (semifinals)

== Draw ==
Key

- Q = Qualifier
- WC = Wild card
- LL = Lucky loser
- Alt = Alternate
- ITF = ITF entry
- PR = Protected ranking
- SR = Special ranking
- SE = Special exempt
- JE = Junior exempt
- JR = Junior Accelerator Programme entrant
- CO = College Accelerator Programme entrant
- NG = Next Gen Accelerator Program entrant
- w/o = Walkover
- r = Retired
- d = Defaulted

=== Finals ===
Semifinals
8	Liudmila Samsonova	6^{7}	2
(United States) Peyton Stearns	7^{9}	6
6	(Spain) Cristina Bucșa	4	1
2	(United States) Iva Jovic	6	6

Final
(United States) Peyton Stearns	4	2
2	(United States) Iva Jovic	6	6

=== Top half ===
First round
(Germany) T Maria	7^{7}	3	2
WC	(United States) T Townsend	6^{0}	6	6
(United States) E Kalieva	6^{9}	4
(United States) K Day	7^{11}	6
(France) E Jacquemot	6^{6}	2
8	L Samsonova	7^{8}	6
(United States) P Stearns	6	6
(Colombia) E Arango	3	2
Q	(France) C Monnet	4	6^{5}
WC	(United States) S Stephens	6	7^{7}
(Czech Republic) D Vidmanova	6^{6}	2
5	(Indonesia) J Tjen	7^{8}	6

Second round
1	(Ukraine) M Kostyuk	w/o
WC	(United States) T Townsend
(United States) K Day	6^{4}	6	6^{5}
8	L Samsonova	7^{7}	2	7^{7}
4	(France) D Parry	2	5
(United States) P Stearns	6	7
WC	(United States) S Stephens	7^{7}	7^{7}
5	(Indonesia) J Tjen	6^{4}	6^{3}

Quarterfinals
1	(Ukraine) M Kostyuk	6	2	5
8	L Samsonova	4	6	7
(United States) P Stearns	7^{8}	6
WC	(United States) S Stephens	6^{6}	4

Semifinals
8	L Samsonova	6^{7}	2
(United States) P Stearns	7^{9}	6

=== Bottom half ===
First round
6	(Spain) C Bucșa	6	6
WC	(Canada) B Andreescu	4	3
(Hungary) P Udvardy	6	6^{6}	6
WC	(France) L Boisson	4	7^{8}	2
(United States) A Parks	6	1	7
Alt	(United States) V Lepchenko	3	6	5
7	(Poland) M Fręch	6	6
Q	(Japan) N Hibino	1	4
(Mexico) R Zarazúa	1	6	3
Q	(United States) C Dolehide	6	3	6
(Turkey) Z Sönmez	6	6
Q	I Shymanovich	1	1

Second round
6	(Spain) C Bucșa	6	6
(Hungary) P Udvardy	4	4
(United States) A Parks	4	3
3	(Czech Republic) S Bejlek	6	6
7	(Poland) M Fręch	6	6
Q	(United States) C Dolehide	4	3
(Turkey) Z Sönmez	6^{5}	4
2	(United States) I Jovic	7^{7}	6

Quarterfinals
6	(Spain) C Bucșa	6	6
3	(Czech Republic) S Bejlek	0	4
7	(Poland) M Fręch	2	1
2	(United States) I Jovic	6	6

Semifinals
6	(Spain) C Bucșa	4	1
2	(United States) I Jovic	6	6

== Qualifying ==
=== Seeds ===
1. (United States) Varvara Lepchenko (moved to main draw)
2. Iryna Shymanovich (qualified)
3. (France) Carole Monnet (qualified)
4. (Spain) Sara Sorribes Tormo (qualifying competition)
5. (Japan) Nao Hibino (qualified)
6. (United States) Katrina Scott (qualifying competition)
7. (Ukraine) Katarina Zavatska (first round)
8. (United States) Caroline Dolehide (qualified)

=== Qualifiers ===
1. (Japan) Nao Hibino
2. Iryna Shymanovich
3. (France) Carole Monnet
4. (United States) Caroline Dolehide

=== Qualifying draw ===
==== First qualifier ====
First round
Alt	(Ukraine) Nadiia Kichenok	6	4	7^{12}
(United States) Nicole Melichar-Martinez	3	6	6^{10}
WC	(Ukraine) Sofiia Bielinska	4	1
5	(Japan) Nao Hibino	6	6

Qualifying competition
Alt	(Ukraine) Nadiia Kichenok	1	2
5	(Japan) Nao Hibino	6	6

==== Second qualifier ====
First round
2	Iryna Shymanovich	7	6
(Mexico) Ana Sofía Sánchez	5	2
(United States) Lea Ma	6	6
7	(Ukraine) Katarina Zavatska	2	2

Qualifying competition
2	Iryna Shymanovich	7^{7}	3
(United States) Lea Ma	6^{1}	0^{r}

==== Third qualifier ====
First round
3	(France) Carole Monnet	7	6
WC	(Mexico) Julia García Ruiz	5	2
Alexandra Panova	2	4
6	(United States) Katrina Scott	6	6

Qualifying competition
3	(France) Carole Monnet	7^{8}	6^{4}	6
6	(United States) Katrina Scott	6^{6}	7^{7}	2

==== Fourth qualifier ====
First round
4	(Spain) Sara Sorribes Tormo	7	6
(Japan) Ena Koike	5	2
(United Kingdom) Mimi Xu	0	4
8	(United States) Caroline Dolehide	6	6

Qualifying competition
4	(Spain) Sara Sorribes Tormo	6	3	6^{5}
8	(United States) Caroline Dolehide	4	6	7^{7}
