= 2023 Guadalajara Open Akron – Singles =

Singles
- 2023 Guadalajara Open Akron

Final
- Champion: (Greece) Maria Sakkari
- Runner-up: (United States) Caroline Dolehide
- Score: 7–5, 6–3

Details
- Draw: 56 (8 Q / 3 WC )
- Seeds: 16

Events
Singles	Doubles
← 2022 ·	Guadalajara Open Akron	· 2024 →

Maria Sakkari defeated Caroline Dolehide in the final, 7–5, 6–3 to win the singles title at the 2023 Guadalajara Open. She did not lose a set en route to her first WTA 1000 title and her second WTA Tour singles title overall, and her first WTA title since 2019, following six successive runner-up finishes. Dolehide reached her first WTA Tour singles final after saving four match points in the second set of the quarterfinals against Martina Trevisan. Ranked No. 111, she became the second finalist ranked outside the Top 100 after Svetlana Kuznetsova (ranked No. 153) since the introduction of the format in 2009.

Jessica Pegula was the reigning champion, but withdrew before the tournament began.

== Seeds ==
The top eight seeds received a bye into the second round.

1. (Tunisia) Ons Jabeur (third round)
2. (Greece) Maria Sakkari (champion)
3. (France) Caroline Garcia (semifinals)
4. (United States) Madison Keys (second round)
5. (Switzerland) Belinda Bencic (withdrew)
6. (Latvia) Jeļena Ostapenko (third round)
7. Veronika Kudermetova (third round)
8. Ekaterina Alexandrova (third round)
9. (Brazil) Beatriz Haddad Maia (withdrew)
10. Victoria Azarenka (quarterfinals)
11. Anastasia Potapova (first round)
12. (Ukraine) Anhelina Kalinina (second round)
13. (Belgium) Elise Mertens (second round)
14. (Egypt) Mayar Sherif (first round)
15. (Italy) Jasmine Paolini (second round)
16. (Czech Republic) Karolína Plíšková (second round)

Click on the seed number of a player to go to their draw section.

== Draw ==
=== Key ===
- Q = Qualifier
- WC = Wild card
- LL = Lucky loser
- Alt = Alternate
- SE = Special exempt
- PR = Protected ranking
- ITF = ITF entry
- JE = Junior exempt
- w/o = Walkover
- r = Retired
- d = Defaulted
- SR = Special ranking

=== Finals ===
Quarterfinals
(Italy) Martina Trevisan	6	6^{9}	3
(United States) Caroline Dolehide	3	7^{11}	6
(Canada) Leylah Fernandez	4	7^{8}	1
(United States) Sofia Kenin	6	6^{6}	6
10	Victoria Azarenka	3	4
3	(France) Caroline Garcia	6	6
(Colombia) Emiliana Arango	3	4
2	(Greece) Maria Sakkari	6	6

Semifinals
(United States) Caroline Dolehide	7	6
(United States) Sofia Kenin	5	3
3	(France) Caroline Garcia	3	0
2	(Greece) Maria Sakkari	6	6

Final
(United States) Caroline Dolehide	5	3
2	(Greece) Maria Sakkari	7	6

=== Top half ===
==== Section 1 ====
First round
(United States) L Davis	3	2
(United States) A Parks	6	6
Q	(Netherlands) D Schuurs	2	0
(Italy) M Trevisan	6	6
(United States) L Chirico	0	6^{3}
15	(Italy) J Paolini	6	7^{7}
LL	(United States) S Vickery	7^{9}	0
(United States) D Collins	6^{7}	0^{r}
(United States) C Dolehide	6^{1}	7^{7}	7^{7}
(United States) P Stearns	7^{7}	6^{5}	6^{2}
(Colombia) C Osorio	1	2
(Poland) M Fręch	6	6

Second round
1	(Tunisia) O Jabeur	6	6
(United States) A Parks	2	2
(Italy) M Trevisan	7	6
15	(Italy) J Paolini	5	2
LL	(United States) S Vickery	3	6	1
(United States) C Dolehide	6	4	6
(Poland) M Fręch	6^{4}	6^{8}
8	E Alexandrova	7^{7}	7^{10}

Third round
1	(Tunisia) O Jabeur	7^{7}	5	3
(Italy) M Trevisan	6^{4}	7	6
(United States) C Dolehide	6	6
8	E Alexandrova	1	2

Quarterfinals
(Italy) M Trevisan	6	6^{9}	3
(United States) C Dolehide	3	7^{11}	6

==== Section 2 ====
First round
(United States) E Navarro	6	6
Q	(United States) M Mateas	0	4
(Canada) L Fernandez	6	6
Q	(United States) A Muhammad	1	3
(Belgium) Y Wickmayer	6^{4}	2
13	(Belgium) E Mertens	7^{7}	6
12	(Ukraine) A Kalinina	6	6
Q	(United States) G Min	2	0
(United States) S Kenin	6	6
Q	(Canada) C Zhao	4	3
(Ukraine) M Kostyuk	6	2	6
(Canada) S Fung	3	6	0

Second round
4	(United States) M Keys	2	6^{5}
(United States) E Navarro	6	7^{7}
(Canada) L Fernandez	6	6
13	(Belgium) E Mertens	3	4
12	(Ukraine) A Kalinina	2	6^{5}
(United States) S Kenin	6	7^{7}
(Ukraine) M Kostyuk	2	3
6	(Latvia) J Ostapenko	6	6

Third round
(United States) E Navarro	2	3
(Canada) L Fernandez	6	6
(United States) S Kenin	6	7
6	(Latvia) J Ostapenko	4	5

Quarterfinals
(Canada) L Fernandez	4	7^{8}	1
(United States) S Kenin	6	6^{6}	6

=== Bottom half ===
==== Section 3 ====
First round
(Mexico) R Zarazúa	1	6^{4}
WC	(Canada) E Bouchard	6	7^{7}
Q	(Mexico) AS Sánchez	6^{1}	4
(Ukraine) D Yastremska	7^{7}	6
(United States) R Montgomery	1	1
10	V Azarenka	6	6
16	(Czech Republic) Ka Plíšková	7	6
Q	(Japan) E Shibahara	5	2
(United States) H Baptiste	6	6
WC	(Mexico) LI Fernández Olivares	2	1
A Sasnovich	6	7^{7}
(Netherlands) A Rus	1	6^{5}

Second round
7	V Kudermetova	6	6^{4}	6
WC	(Canada) E Bouchard	2	7^{7}	4
(Ukraine) D Yastremska	4	6^{5}
10	V Azarenka	6	7^{7}
16	(Czech Republic) Ka Plíšková	6^{5}	7	6^{4}
(United States) H Baptiste	7^{7}	5	7^{7}
A Sasnovich	6	6^{5}	4
3	(France) C Garcia	4	7^{7}	6

Third round
7	V Kudermetova	2	1
10	V Azarenka	6	6
(United States) H Baptiste	5	4
3	(France) C Garcia	7	6

Quarterfinals
10	V Azarenka	3	4
3	(France) C Garcia	6	6

==== Section 4 ====
First round
WC	(Australia) A Tomljanović	6^{3}	4
(United States) T Townsend	7^{7}	6
(United States) S Stephens	7	6
Q	(United States) A Li	5	4
(Colombia) E Arango	6	6
11	A Potapova	4	3
14	(Egypt) M Sherif	5	3
(Italy) C Giorgi	7	6
(France) K Mladenovic	0	0
(Spain) C Bucșa	6	6
(Australia) S Hunter	6	6
I Shymanovich	3	4

Second round
LL	(United States) E Kalieva	1	6^{3}
(United States) T Townsend	6	7^{7}
(United States) S Stephens	1	2
(Colombia) E Arango	6	6
(Italy) C Giorgi	6	6
(Spain) C Bucșa	1	2
(Australia) S Hunter	2	4
2	(Greece) M Sakkari	6	6

Third round
(United States) T Townsend	5	6	4
(Colombia) E Arango	7	1	6
(Italy) C Giorgi	2	2
2	(Greece) M Sakkari	6	6

Quarterfinals
(Colombia) E Arango	3	4
2	(Greece) M Sakkari	6	6

== Qualifying ==
=== Seeds ===
1. (United States) Ann Li (qualified)
2. Polina Kudermetova (first round)
3. (United States) Sachia Vickery (qualifying competition, lucky loser)
4. (United States) Elvina Kalieva (qualifying competition, lucky loser)
5. (Croatia) Jana Fett (qualifying competition)
6. (Serbia) Natalija Stevanović (qualifying competition)
7. (Canada) Carol Zhao (qualified)
8. Anastasia Tikhonova (first round)
9. (Bulgaria) Isabella Shinikova (first round)
10. (United States) Katrina Scott (first round)
11. (United States) Raveena Kingsley (qualifying competition)
12. (United States) Grace Min (qualified)
13. (United States) Maria Mateas (qualified)
14. (United States) Asia Muhammad (qualified)
15. (United States) Whitney Osuigwe (first round)
16. (Colombia) María Herazo González (first round)

=== Qualifiers ===
1. (United States) Ann Li
2. (United States) Asia Muhammad
3. (Japan) Ena Shibahara
4. (Netherlands) Demi Schuurs
5. (United States) Grace Min
6. (United States) Maria Mateas
7. (Canada) Carol Zhao
8. (Mexico) Ana Sofía Sánchez

=== Lucky losers ===
1. (United States) Sachia Vickery
2. (United States) Elvina Kalieva

=== Draw ===
==== First qualifier ====
First round
1	(United States) Ann Li	6	6
(United States) Jessica Failla	1	1
(Romania) Monica Niculescu	7^{8}	6
10	(United States) Katrina Scott	6^{6}	1

Qualifying competition
1	(United States) Ann Li	w/o
(Romania) Monica Niculescu

==== Second qualifier ====
First round
2	Polina Kudermetova	1	3
(United States) Varvara Lepchenko	6	6
WC	(Mexico) Victoria Rodríguez	4	6	5
14	(United States) Asia Muhammad	6	3	7

Qualifying competition
(United States) Varvara Lepchenko	1	6	5
14	(United States) Asia Muhammad	6	3	7

==== Third qualifier ====
First round
3	(United States) Sachia Vickery	6	3	6
(United States) Alana Smith	2	6	2
(Japan) Ena Shibahara	6	6
15	(United States) Whitney Osuigwe	1	3

Qualifying competition
3	(United States) Sachia Vickery	2	3
(Japan) Ena Shibahara	6	6

==== Fourth qualifier ====
First round
4	(United States) Elvina Kalieva	7	7^{7}
(Chile) Alexa Guarachi	5	6^{3}
(Netherlands) Demi Schuurs	6	6
9	(Bulgaria) Isabella Shinikova	4	2

Qualifying competition
4	(United States) Elvina Kalieva	1	3
(Netherlands) Demi Schuurs	6	6

==== Fifth qualifier ====
First round
5	(Croatia) Jana Fett	6	6
(Norway) Ulrikke Eikeri	3	3
(United States) Nicole Melichar-Martinez	1	6	6^{3}
12	(United States) Grace Min	6	2	7^{7}

Qualifying competition
5	(Croatia) Jana Fett	4	1
12	(United States) Grace Min	6	6

==== Sixth qualifier ====
First round
6	(Serbia) Natalija Stevanović	6	7
(United States) Sofia Sewing	2	5
WC	(Mexico) María Fernanda Navarro Oliva	1	2
13	(United States) Maria Mateas	6	6

Qualifying competition
6	(Serbia) Natalija Stevanović	3	5
13	(United States) Maria Mateas	6	7

==== Seventh qualifier ====
First round
7	(Canada) Carol Zhao	6	6
(Australia) Ellen Perez	4	4
WC	(Georgia (country)) Oksana Kalashnikova	4	4
11	(United States) Raveena Kingsley	6	6

Qualifying competition
7	(Canada) Carol Zhao	7	6
11	(United States) Raveena Kingsley	5	3

==== Eighth qualifier ====
First round
8	Anastasia Tikhonova	4	6	5
Veronika Miroshnichenko	6	4	7
(Mexico) Ana Sofía Sánchez	5	7^{7}	6
16	(Colombia) María Herazo González	7	6^{2}	1

Qualifying competition
Veronika Miroshnichenko	6^{2}	2
(Mexico) Ana Sofía Sánchez	7^{7}	6
