= 2022 Grand Prix SAR La Princesse Lalla Meryem =

- Date: 15 – 21 May
- Edition: 20th
- Category: WTA 250
- Draw: 32S / 16D
- Prize money: $251,750
- Surface: Clay / outdoor
- Location: Rabat, Morocco
- Venue: Club des Cheminots

Champions

Singles
- (Italy) Martina Trevisan

Doubles
- (Japan) Eri Hozumi / (Japan) Makoto Ninomiya
- Morocco Open

The 2022 Grand Prix SAR La Princesse Lalla Meryem was a women's professional tennis tournament played on clay courts. It was the 20th edition of the tournament and part of the WTA 250 category of the 2022 WTA Tour. It took place in Rabat, Morocco, between 15 and 21 May 2022.

== Champions ==
=== Singles ===
- (Italy) Martina Trevisan def. (United States) Claire Liu, 6–2, 6–1

This is Trevisan's first career WTA singles title.

=== Doubles ===
- (Japan) Eri Hozumi / (Japan) Makoto Ninomiya def. (Romania) Monica Niculescu / Alexandra Panova 6–7^{(7–9)}, 6–3, [10–8]

== Points and prize money ==
Event	W	F	SF	QF	Round of 16	Round of 32	Q	Q2	Q1
Women's Singles	280	180	110	60	30	1	18	12	1
Women's Doubles	280	180	110	60	1	—N/a	—N/a	—N/a	—N/a

=== Prize money ===
Event	W	F	SF	QF	Round of 16	Round of 32	Q2	Q1
Women's Singles	$43,000	$21,400	$11,500	$6,175	$3,400	$2,100	$1,020	$600
Women's Doubles	$12,300	$6,400	$3,435	$1,820	$960	—N/a	—N/a	—N/a

== Singles main draw entrants ==
=== Seeds ===
Country	Player	Rank^{1}	Seed
ESP	Garbiñe Muguruza	10	1
AUS	Ajla Tomljanović	41	2
ESP	Nuria Párrizas Díaz	51	3
EGY	Mayar Sherif	62	4
HUN	Anna Bondár	69	5
~~CHN~~	~~Zheng Qinwen~~	~~73~~	~~6~~
NED	Arantxa Rus	74	7
	Anna Kalinskaya	75	8
SWE	Rebecca Peterson	77	9

- Rankings are as of May 9, 2022.

=== Other entrants ===
The following players received wildcards into the singles main draw:

- (Croatia) Petra Marčinko
- (Spain) Garbiñe Muguruza
- (Switzerland) Lulu Sun

The following players received entry from the qualifying draw:

- (Italy) Cristiana Ferrando
- Ekaterina Reyngold
- (China) You Xiaodi
- (Canada) Carol Zhao

The following players received entry as lucky losers:

- (France) Tessah Andrianjafitrimo
- (Kazakhstan) Anna Danilina

=== Withdrawals ===
Before the tournament

- (Poland) Magdalena Fręch → replaced by (Mexico) Marcela Zacarías
- (Brazil) Beatriz Haddad Maia → replaced by (United States) Catherine Harrison
- (Serbia) Ivana Jorović → replaced by (France) Kristina Mladenovic
- (United States) Ann Li → replaced by Kamilla Rakhimova
- (Kazakhstan) Yulia Putintseva → replaced by (Norway) Ulrikke Eikeri
- (Germany) Laura Siegemund → replaced by (Hungary) Dalma Gálfi
- (Belgium) Alison Van Uytvanck → replaced by (Australia) Astra Sharma
- (China) Wang Xinyu → replaced by (Kazakhstan) Anna Danilina
- (China) Zheng Qinwen → replaced by (France) Tessah Andrianjafitrimo

== Doubles main draw entrants ==
=== Seeds ===
Country	Player	Country	Player	Rank^{1}	Seed
JPN	Eri Hozumi	JPN	Makoto Ninomiya	87	1
ROU	Monica Niculescu		Alexandra Panova	114	2
	Natela Dzalamidze		Kamilla Rakhimova	115	3
~~FRA~~	~~Kristina Mladenovic~~	~~JPN~~	~~Ena Shibahara~~	~~123~~	~~4~~
NOR	Ulrikke Eikeri	USA	Catherine Harrison	128	5

- ^{1} Rankings as of May 9, 2022.

=== Other entrants ===
The following pairs received wildcards into the doubles main draw:

- (Morocco) Yasmine Kabbaj / Ekaterina Kazionova

=== Withdrawals ===
Before the tournament

- (Kazakhstan) Anna Danilina / (Brazil) Beatriz Haddad Maia → replaced by (Czech Republic) Anastasia Dețiuc / Yana Sizikova
- (France) Kristina Mladenovic / (Japan) Ena Shibahara → replaced by (France) Clara Burel / (France) Kristina Mladenovic
