= 2025 Guadalajara Open Akron =

- Date: 8 – 14 September
- Edition: 4th
- Category: WTA 500
- Draw: 28S / 16D
- Surface: Hard
- Location: Guadalajara, Mexico
- Venue: Panamerican Tennis Center

Champions

Singles
- (United States) Iva Jovic

Doubles
- Irina Khromacheva / (United States) Nicole Melichar-Martinez
- Guadalajara Open Akron

The 2025 Guadalajara Open Akron presented by Santander was a women's tennis tournament played on outdoor hardcourts. It was the fourth edition of the tournament, a WTA 500 event on the 2025 WTA Tour. It was held at the Panamerican Tennis Center in Zapopan, Guadalajara, Mexico, from 8 to 14 September 2025. Unseeded Iva Jovic won the singles title.

== Champions ==
=== Singles ===
- (United States) Iva Jovic def. (Colombia) Emiliana Arango 6–4, 6–1

=== Doubles ===
- Irina Khromacheva / (United States) Nicole Melichar-Martinez def. (Mexico) Giuliana Olmos / (Indonesia) Aldila Sutjiadi, 6–3, 6–4

== Singles main-draw entrants ==
=== Seeds ===
Country	Player	Rank^{†}	Seed
BEL	Elise Mertens	21	1
	Veronika Kudermetova	25	2
LAT	Jeļena Ostapenko	26	3
POL	Magdalena Fręch	33	4
POL	Magda Linette	37	5
GER	Tatjana Maria	42	6
USA	Alycia Parks	56	7
COL	Camila Osorio	63	8

^{†} Rankings are as of 25 August 2025.

=== Other entrants ===
The following players received wildcards into the main draw:

- (Czech Republic) Nikola Bartůňková
- (Australia) Storm Hunter
- (United States) Sloane Stephens
- (Italy) Martina Trevisan

The following players received entry from the qualifying draw:

- (Italy) Nicole Fossa Huergo
- (Andorra) Victoria Jiménez Kasintseva
- Elena Pridankina
- (Canada) Marina Stakusic
- (Italy) Lucrezia Stefanini
- (Czech Republic) Darja Vidmanová

=== Withdrawals ===
- (Canada) Leylah Fernandez → replaced by (Turkey) Zeynep Sönmez
- Anna Kalinskaya → replaced by (Colombia) Emiliana Arango
- (United Kingdom) Sonay Kartal → replaced by (United States) Iva Jovic
- (United States) Emma Navarro → replaced by (Czech Republic) Kateřina Siniaková
- (United States) Peyton Stearns → replaced by (France) Elsa Jacquemot
- (Romania) Elena-Gabriela Ruse → replaced by (Poland) Katarzyna Kawa

== Doubles main-draw entrants ==
=== Seeds ===
Country	Player	Country	Player	Rank^{1}	Seed
	Irina Khromacheva	USA	Nicole Melichar-Martinez	36	1
MEX	Giuliana Olmos	INA	Aldila Sutjiadi	98	2
BEL	Magali Kempen	POL	Katarzyna Piter	127	3
USA	Sabrina Santamaria	CHN	Tang Qianhui	128	4

- ^{1} Rankings as of 25 August 2025.

=== Other entrants ===
The following pair received a wildcard into the doubles main draw:

- (Mexico) Fernanda Contreras Gómez / (Canada) Rebecca Marino

The following pair received entry as alternates:

- (Czech Republic) Nikola Bartůňková / (Andorra) Victoria Jiménez Kasintseva

=== Withdrawals ===
- (France) Amandine Hesse / (Germany) Tatjana Maria → replaced by (Czech Republic) Nikola Bartůňková / (Andorra) Victoria Jiménez Kasintseva
