= 2026 Guadalajara Open – Doubles =

Doubles
- 2026 Guadalajara Open

Final
- Champions: (Spain) Cristina Bucșa (United States) Nicole Melichar-Martinez
- Runners-up: (Japan) Momoko Kobori (Thailand) Peangtarn Plipuech
- Score: 6–2, 5–7, [10–5]
- Date: 19 September 2026

Details
- Draw: 16
- Seeds: 4

Events
Singles	Doubles
- Guadalajara Open

Defending champion Nicole Melichar-Martinez and her partner Cristina Bucșa defeated Momoko Kobori and Peangtarn Plipuech in the final, 6–2, 5–7, [10–5] to win the doubles tennis title at the 2026 Guadalajara Open.

Irina Khromacheva and Melichar-Martinez were the defending champions, but chose not to compete together. Khromacheva partnered Caroline Dolehide, but lost in the quarterfinals to Bucșa and Melichar-Martinez.

== Seeds ==
1. (Spain) Cristina Bucșa / (United States) Nicole Melichar-Martinez (champions)
2. (United States) Asia Muhammad / (Mexico) Giuliana Olmos (first round)
3. (United States) Quinn Gleason / (Poland) Katarzyna Piter (semifinals)
4. Maria Kozyreva / (United Kingdom) Maia Lumsden (semifinals)

== Draw ==
Key

- Q = Qualifier
- WC = Wild card
- LL = Lucky loser
- Alt = Alternate
- ITF = ITF entry
- PR = Protected ranking
- SR = Special ranking
- SE = Special exempt
- JE = Junior exempt
- JR = Junior Accelerator Programme entrant
- CO = College Accelerator Programme entrant
- NG = Next Gen Accelerator Program entrant
- w/o = Walkover
- r = Retired
- d = Defaulted

First round
1	(Spain) C Bucșa (United States) N Melichar-Martinez	6	6
WC	(Venezuela) S Cabezas Domínguez (Mexico) M Gómez Pezuela Cano	2	1
(United States) V Lepchenko (United States) P Stearns	1	5
(United States) C Dolehide; I Khromacheva	6	7
4	M Kozyreva (United Kingdom) M Lumsden	6	6
(United States) K Day (Mexico) R Zarazúa	3	3
PR	(Chile) A Guarachi (Japan) M Ninomiya	5	6	[10]
(Netherlands) I Haverlag (Slovenia) N Radišić	7	4	[4]
(United States) C Harrison (United States) D Hewitt	6	6
I Shymanovich (Czech Republic) M Škoch	2	3
A Panova (Spain) S Sorribes Tormo	2	6	[6]
3	(United States) Q Gleason (Poland) K Piter	6	3	[10]
(Colombia) E Arango (Hungary) P Udvardy	2	4
(Spain) Y Cavallé Reimers (Belgium) L Salden	6	6
(Japan) M Kobori (Thailand) P Plipuech	1	6	[10]
2	(United States) A Muhammad (Mexico) G Olmos	6	3	[3]

Quarterfinals
1	(Spain) C Bucșa (United States) N Melichar-Martinez	6	6
(United States) C Dolehide; I Khromacheva	2	2
4	M Kozyreva (United Kingdom) M Lumsden	7	7
PR	(Chile) A Guarachi (Japan) M Ninomiya	5	5
(United States) C Harrison (United States) D Hewitt	3	5
3	(United States) Q Gleason (Poland) K Piter	6	7
(Spain) Y Cavallé Reimers (Belgium) L Salden	3	4
(Japan) M Kobori (Thailand) P Plipuech	6	6

Semifinals
1	(Spain) C Bucșa (United States) N Melichar-Martinez	7^{8}	6
4	M Kozyreva (United Kingdom) M Lumsden	6^{6}	2
3	(United States) Q Gleason (Poland) K Piter	6	3	[4]
(Japan) M Kobori (Thailand) P Plipuech	4	6	[10]

Final
1	(Spain) C Bucșa (United States) N Melichar-Martinez	6	5	[10]
(Japan) M Kobori (Thailand) P Plipuech	2	7	[5]
