= 2026 Guadalajara Open =

- Date: 13 – 19 September
- Edition: 5th
- Category: WTA 500
- Draw: 28S / 16D
- Prize money: $1,206,446
- Surface: Hard
- Location: Guadalajara, Mexico
- Venue: Panamerican Tennis Center

Champions

Singles
- (United States) Iva Jovic

Doubles
- (Spain) Cristina Bucșa / (United States) Nicole Melichar-Martinez
- Guadalajara Open Akron

The 2026 Guadalajara Open presentado por Santander was a women's tennis tournament played on outdoor hardcourts. It was the fifth edition of the tournament, a WTA 500 event on the 2026 WTA Tour. It was held at the Panamerican Tennis Center in Zapopan, Guadalajara, Mexico, from 13 to 19 September 2026.

== Champions ==
=== Singles ===
- (United States) Iva Jovic def. (United States) Peyton Stearns, 6–4, 6–2

=== Doubles ===
- (Spain) Cristina Bucșa / (United States) Nicole Melichar-Martinez def. (Japan) Momoko Kobori / (Thailand) Peangtarn Plipuech, 6–2, 5–7, [10–5]

== Singles main-draw entrants ==
=== Seeds ===
Country	Player	Rank^{†}	Seed
UKR	Marta Kostyuk	11	1
USA	Iva Jovic	14	2
CZE	Sára Bejlek	30	3
FRA	Diane Parry	31	4
INA	Janice Tjen	36	5
ESP	Cristina Bucșa	40	6
POL	Magdalena Fręch	41	7
	Liudmila Samsonova	47	8

^{†} Rankings are as of 31 August 2026.

=== Other entrants ===
The following players received wildcards into the main draw:

- (Canada) Bianca Andreescu
- (France) Loïs Boisson
- (United States) Sloane Stephens
- (United States) Taylor Townsend

The following player received entry as an alternate:

- (United States) Varvara Lepchenko

The following players received entry from the qualifying draw:

- (United States) Caroline Dolehide
- (Japan) Nao Hibino
- (France) Carole Monnet
- Iryna Shymanovich

=== Withdrawals ===
- Anna Kalinskaya → replaced by (Germany) Tatjana Maria
- (United States) McCartney Kessler → replaced by (United States) Elvina Kalieva
- (United States) Ashlyn Krueger → replaced by (France) Elsa Jacquemot
- (Colombia) Camila Osorio → replaced by (Czech Republic) Darja Vidmanova
- (Croatia) Antonia Ružić → replaced by (Colombia) Emiliana Arango
- (Egypt) Mayar Sherif → replaced by (United States) Varvara Lepchenko

== Doubles main-draw entrants ==
=== Seeds ===
Country	Player	Country	Player	Rank^{1}	Seed
ESP	Cristina Bucșa	USA	Nicole Melichar-Martinez	30	1
USA	Asia Muhammad	MEX	Giuliana Olmos	87	2
USA	Quinn Gleason	POL	Katarzyna Piter	89	3
	Maria Kozyreva	GBR	Maia Lumsden	99	4

- ^{1} Rankings as of 31 August 2026.

=== Other entrants ===
The following pair received a wildcard into the doubles main draw:

- (Venezuela) Sofía Cabezas Domínguez / (Mexico) Marian Gómez Pezuela Cano
