= 2025 Guadalajara Open Akron – Doubles =

Doubles
- 2025 Guadalajara Open Akron

Final
- Champions: Irina Khromacheva (United States) Nicole Melichar-Martinez
- Runners-up: (Mexico) Giuliana Olmos (Indonesia) Aldila Sutjiadi
- Score: 6–3, 6–4

Details
- Draw: 16
- Seeds: 4

Events
Singles	Doubles
- Guadalajara Open Akron

Defending champion Irina Khromacheva and her partner Nicole Melichar-Martinez defeated Giuliana Olmos and Aldila Sutjiadi in the final, 6–3, 6–4 to win the doubles tennis title at the 2025 Guadalajara Open.

Anna Danilina and Khromacheva were the reigning champions, but Danilina chose not to participate this year.

== Seeds ==
1. Irina Khromacheva / (United States) Nicole Melichar-Martinez (champions)
2. (Mexico) Giuliana Olmos / (Indonesia) Aldila Sutjiadi (final)
3. (Belgium) Magali Kempen / (Poland) Katarzyna Piter (semifinals)
4. (United States) Sabrina Santamaria / (China) Tang Qianhui (quarterfinals)

== Draw ==
Key

- Q = Qualifier
- WC = Wild card
- LL = Lucky loser
- Alt = Alternate
- ITF = ITF entry
- PR = Protected ranking
- SR = Special ranking
- SE = Special exempt
- JE = Junior exempt
- JR = Junior Accelerator Programme entrant
- CO = College Accelerator Programme entrant
- NG = Next Gen Accelerator Program entrant
- w/o = Walkover
- r = Retired
- d = Defaulted

=== Draw ===
First round
1	I Khromacheva (United States) N Melichar-Martinez	6	6
(Australia) S Hunter (United States) D Krawczyk	2	1
M Kozyreva; I Shymanovich	6	6
(Romania) M Niculescu (Colombia) C Osorio	2	3
3	(Belgium) M Kempen (Poland) K Piter	6^{1}	6	[10]
(Italy) N Fossa Huergo (Poland) M Kubka	7^{7}	3	[6]
(Czech Republic) A Dețiuc; E Pridankina	2	6	[8]
(France) E Jacquemot; P Kudermetova	6	2	[10]
(United States) J Aney (United States) Q Gleason	6	3	[10]
(United States) C Corley (United States) I Corley	2	6	[6]
Alt	(Czech Republic) N Bartůňková (Andorra) V Jiménez Kasintseva	1	6	[8]
4	(United States) S Santamaria (China) Q Tang	6	4	[10]
(United States) I Jovic (Japan) E Shibahara	5	6	[9]
(United States) A Smith (Czech Republic) D Vidmanová	7	4	[11]
WC	(Mexico) F Contreras Gómez (Canada) R Marino	5	2
2	(Mexico) G Olmos (Indonesia) A Sutjiadi	7	6

Quarterfinals
1	I Khromacheva (United States) N Melichar-Martinez	7^{7}	6^{5}	[10]
M Kozyreva; I Shymanovich	6^{1}	7^{7}	[2]
3	(Belgium) M Kempen (Poland) K Piter	w/o
(France) E Jacquemot; P Kudermetova
(United States) J Aney (United States) Q Gleason	3	7^{8}	[11]
4	(United States) S Santamaria (China) Q Tang	6	6^{6}	[9]
(United States) A Smith (Czech Republic) D Vidmanová
2	(Mexico) G Olmos (Indonesia) A Sutjiadi	w/o

Semifinals
1	I Khromacheva (United States) N Melichar-Martinez	4	7	[10]
3	(Belgium) M Kempen (Poland) K Piter	6	5	[6]
(United States) J Aney (United States) Q Gleason	3	4
2	(Mexico) G Olmos (Indonesia) A Sutjiadi	6	6

Final
1	I Khromacheva (United States) N Melichar-Martinez	6	6
2	(Mexico) G Olmos (Indonesia) A Sutjiadi	3	4
