= Martina Trevisan =

Italian tennis player (born 1993)

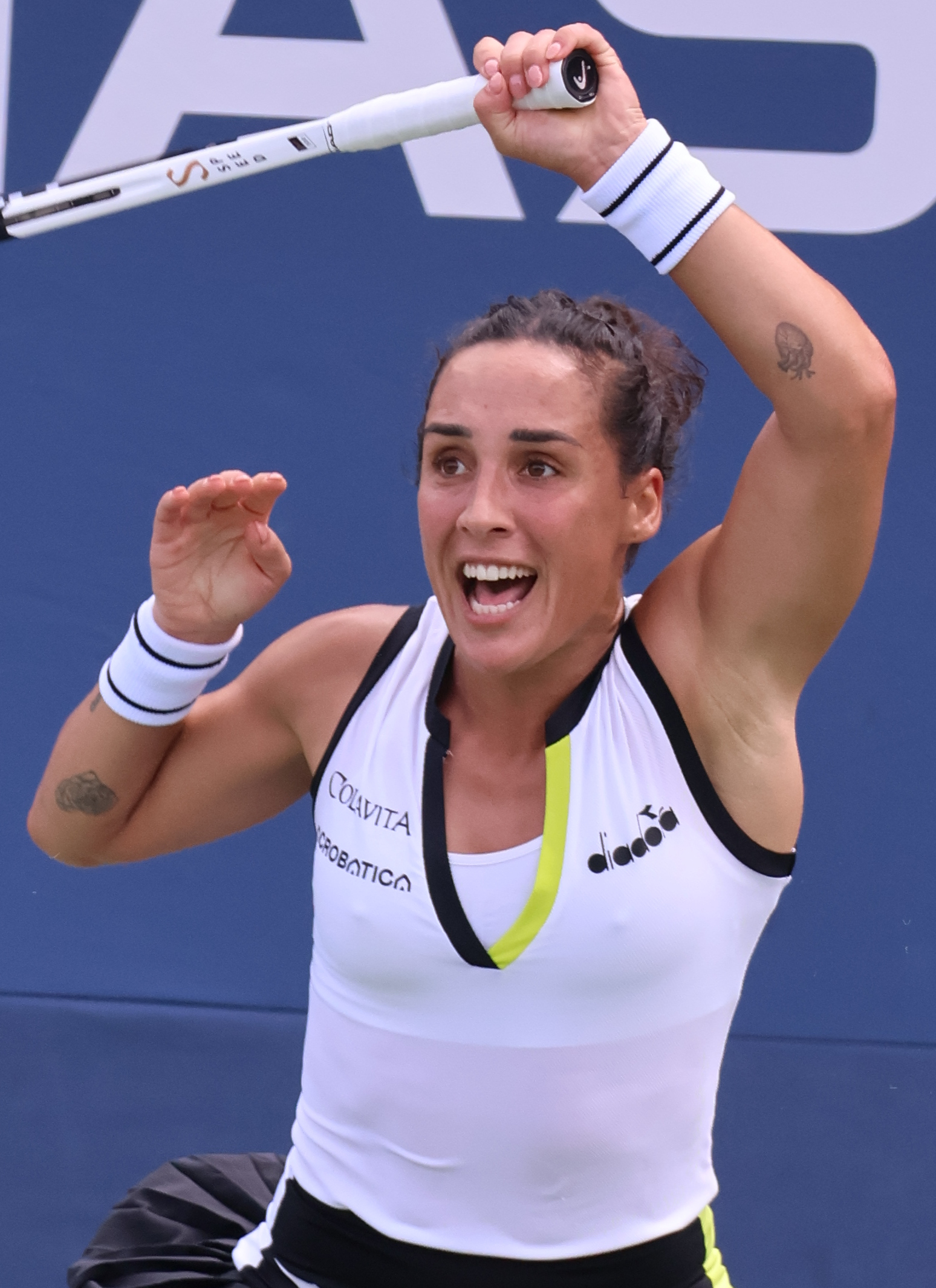
- Trevisan at the 2023 US Open
- Country (sports): Italy
- Born: 3 November 1993 (age 33) Florence, Italy
- Height: 1.60 m (5 ft 3 in)
- Plays: Left (two-handed backhand)
- Coach: Matteo Catarsi
- Prize money: $4,363,766

Singles
- Career record: 338–249
- Career titles: 1
- Highest ranking: No. 18 (8 May 2023)
- Current ranking: No. 322 (10 August 2026)

Grand Slam singles results
- Australian Open: 2R (2022, 2024)
- French Open: SF (2022)
- Wimbledon: 1R (2021, 2022, 2023, 2024)
- US Open: 2R (2021, 2023)

Doubles
- Career record: 30–42
- Career titles: 0 WTA, 2 ITF
- Highest ranking: No. 138 (14 June 2021)

Grand Slam doubles results
- Australian Open: QF (2021)
- French Open: 2R (2023)
- Wimbledon: 1R (2022, 2023, 2024)
- US Open: 1R (2023, 2024)

Team competitions
- BJK Cup: W (2024)
- Last updated on: 11 August 2026.

Martina Trevisan (Italian pronunciation: [marˈtiːna treviˈzan]; born 3 November 1993) is an Italian professional tennis player. She has a career-high singles ranking of No. 18 by the WTA, achieved in May 2023, and a best doubles ranking of No. 138. For Italy, she was finalist in the 2023 Billie Jean King Cup and won the 2024 Billie Jean King Cup. In 2022, she won the WTA Tour singles title at the Rabat Grand Prix in Morocco, and reached her first Grand Slam semifinal at the French Open (after reaching the first major quarterfinal in the 2021 edition). In 2020, she received a nomination for the WTA Newcomer of the Year. As the Italian female number one player, she paired with the Italian No. 1, Lorenzo Musetti, as part of the 2023 United Cup, reaching the final but losing to Jessica Pegula in the singles.

Trevisan has also won one singles title on the WTA Challenger Tour as well as ten singles and two doubles titles on the ITF Women's Circuit. Playing for the Italy Billie Jean King Cup team, she has a win-loss record of 11–7 (6–4 in singles), as of August 2026.

== Career ==
In 2009, Trevisan reached the semifinals of both the French Open and the Wimbledon Championships in girls' doubles competitions.

=== 2020: Major debut & first quarterfinal in singles ===
In 2020, she made her Grand Slam debut at the Australian Open, overcoming former Wimbledon finalist Eugenie Bouchard in the qualifiers to reach the main draw before falling to eventual champion, Sofia Kenin, in straight sets. However, playing in doubles with Sara Errani, she arrives at the quarterfinal.

At the French Open, she came through the qualifiers to face Camila Giorgi; Giorgi retired in the second set due to injury. In the second round, Trevisan beat Coco Gauff in three sets to progress to her first third round at a major. She followed that up with a win against 20th seed Maria Sakkari, after losing the first set 1–6 and edging the second (saving two match points) in a tie-break. She then defeated fifth seed Kiki Bertens, in straight sets, to move into her first Grand Slam quarterfinal where she lost to the eventual champion, Iga Świątek, also in straight sets.

=== 2021–22: Major semifinal & WTA Tour title, top 30 ===
In 2021, she was a quarterfinalist also at the Australian Open, in doubles partnering Aleksandra Krunić.

In 2022, she won her maiden title in Rabat defeating Claire Liu who was also a first-time WTA finalist. As a result, she reached the top 60 at world No. 59 on 23 May 2022.

Trevisan continued her run of form by reaching her first major semifinal at the French Open, defeating Harriet Dart, Magda Linette, Daria Saville, Aliaksandra Sasnovich, and 17th seed Leylah Fernandez, extending her winning streak to 10 matches before losing to Coco Gauff in the semifinals. She became the third Italian woman to reach the Roland Garros semifinals in the Open era, following 2010 champion Francesca Schiavone and 2012 finalist Sara Errani.

In July, she reached quarterfinals of the Budapest Grand Prix, in which she lost to Anna Bondár, in straight sets.

=== 2023: Two WTA 1000 quarterfinals and top 20 ===
Seeded 23rd at the Indian Wells Open and having received a bye, she reached the third round for the first time in her career with a win over Madison Brengle. At the Miami Open, she went even further, reaching the quarterfinals, the first Italian to get this far in the singles draw at the tournament in a decade, defeating Nao Hibino, Claire Liu and 24th seed Jeļena Ostapenko. She was also the sixth Italian overall to feature in the quarterfinals in Miami. As a result, she made her top 20 debut.

At the Guadalajara Open, she defeated top-seeded Ons Jabeur to reach her second WTA 1000 quarterfinal of the season. Trevisan became the first Italian to make multiple quarterfinals at the WTA 1000-level during the same season since Flavia Pennetta, Roberta Vinci and Sara Errani did so in 2015.

=== 2024: Swedish Open title, Billie Jean King Cup champion ===
Trevisan reached the second round at the Australian Open with a three-set win over Renata Zarazúa, but then lost to Océane Dodin.

At the Open de Rouen in April, she defeated four-time major champion Naomi Osaka in the first round, before losing her next match to third seed Anhelina Kalinina.

The following month Trevisan reached the second round at the Morocco Open with a three-set win over Nao Hibino to set up a meeting with fellow Italian Lucia Bronzetti, which she lost in straight sets. Ranked No. 87, she received a wildcard for her home tournament, the WTA 1000 Italian Open, but lost to Yulia Putintseva in straight sets.

Seeded seventh, Trevisan won a WTA 125 title at the Swedish Open in July, defeating Astra Sharma, Miriam Bulgaru, top seed Diane Parry and Louisa Chirico before overcoming Ann Li in straight sets in the final.

In September, she reached back-to-back quarterfinals in Guadalajara, Mexico. First at the Guadalajara 125 Open, she defeated Aleksandra Krunić in the round-of-16 before retiring injured while trailing against eventual champion Kamilla Rakhimova. Then she made the last eight at the WTA 500 Guadalajara Open with wins over eighth seed Caroline Dolehide and Renata Zarazúa, before losing to qualifier and eventual champion, Olivia Gadecki. Despite these good results, she fell out of the top 100 on 23 September 2024. Ranked No. 112, she lost in the first round of the WTA 1000 China Open to Taylor Townsend, her sixth loss in the season at this level.

On 20 November 2024, she won the Billie Jean King Cup with the Italian team.

== Personal life ==
She is the younger sister of Matteo Trevisan who was a professional tennis player on the ATP World Tour. Her father, Claudio Trevisan, was a professional football player, who died in 2024 following a long disease. Martina told to the New York Times that she took a break from tennis for several years whilst she battled with anorexia, particularly impacted by the disease of her father. She stopped tennis and had foot surgery in March 2025 because of Haglund's syndrome.

== Performance timelines ==
Key
W	F	SF	QF	#R	RR	Q#	P#	DNQ	A	Z#	PO	G	S	B	NMS	NTI	P	NH

(W) winner; (F) finalist; (SF) semifinalist; (QF) quarterfinalist; (#R) rounds 4, 3, 2, 1; (RR) round-robin stage; (Q#) qualification round; (P#) preliminary round; (DNQ) did not qualify; (A) absent; (Z#) Davis/Fed Cup Zonal Group (with number indication) or (PO) play-off; (G) gold, (S) silver or (B) bronze Olympic/Paralympic medal; (NMS) not a Masters tournament; (NTI) not a Tier I tournament; (P) postponed; (NH) not held; (SR) strike rate (events won / competed); (W–L) win–loss record.
To avoid confusion and double counting, these charts are updated at the conclusion of a tournament or when the player's participation has ended.

Only main-draw results in WTA Tour, Grand Slam tournaments, Billie Jean King Cup, Hopman Cup, United Cup and Olympic Games are included in win–loss records.

=== Singles ===
Current through the 2026 Italian Open.

Tournament	2009	...	2017	2018	2019	2020	2021	2022	2023	2024	2025	2026	SR	W–L	Win%
Grand Slam tournaments
Australian Open	A		A	A	Q3	1R	1R	2R	1R	2R	A	A	0 / 5	2–5	29%
French Open	A		A	Q3	Q2	QF	2R	SF	1R	1R	A	Q2	0 / 5	10–5	67%
Wimbledon	A		Q1	Q2	Q1	NH	1R	1R	1R	1R	A	A	0 / 4	0–4	0%
US Open	A		Q2	Q3	Q1	A	2R	1R	2R	1R	Q1		0 / 4	2–4	33%
Win–loss	0–0		0–0	0–0	0–0	4–2	2–4	6–4	1–4	1–4	0–0	0–0	0 / 18	14–18	44%
National representation
Billie Jean King Cup (Note: Formerly known as Fed Cup until 2020.)	A		WG2	A	WG2	PO (Note: Edition is split into the two years due to COVID-19.)		RR	F	W	A		1 / 3	6–4	60%
WTA 1000
Qatar Open	NMS		NMS	A	NMS	A	NMS	Q1	NMS	1R	A	A	0 / 1	0–1	0%
Dubai Championships	A		A	NMS	A	NMS	2R	NMS	1R	Q1	A	A	0 / 2	0–2	0%
Indian Wells Open	A		A	A	A	NH	2R	A	3R	1R	A	Q1	0 / 3	2–3	40%
Miami Open	A		A	A	A	NH	Q1	Q1	QF	1R	A	Q1	0 / 2	3–2	60%
Madrid Open	A		A	A	A	NH	Q1	Q2	4R	1R	A	Q1	0 / 2	2–2	50%
Italian Open	Q1		Q1	Q1	A	Q1	1R	1R	2R	1R	A	1R	0 / 5	0–5	0%
Canadian Open	A		A	A	A	NH	A	1R	A	A	A		0 / 1	0–1	0%
Cincinnati Open	A		A	A	A	A	A	1R	2R	Q2	Q1		0 / 2	1–2	33%
Guadalajara Open	NH							3R	QF	NMS			0 / 2	5–2	71%
China Open	A		A	A	A	NH			1R	1R	A		0 / 2	0–2	0%
Wuhan Open	A		A	A	A	NH				Q1	A		0 / 0	0–0	–
Win–loss	0–0		0–0	0–0	0–0	0–0	1–3	2–4	10–8	0–6	0–0	0–1	0 / 22	13–22	37%
Career statistics
	2009	...	2017	2018	2019	2020	2021	2022	2023	2024	2025	2026	SR	W–L	Win%
Tournaments	0		2	2	4	2	16	17	22	20	1	1	Career total: 67		
Titles	0		0	0	0	0	0	1	0	0	0	0	Career total: 2		
Finals	0		0	0	0	0	0	1	0	0	0	0	Career total: 2		
Hard win–loss	0–0		0–0	0–0	0–1	0–1	3–10	6–9	18–17	5–12	0–1	0–0	0 / 47	32–51	39%
Clay win–loss	0–0		1–2	0–2	1–5	4–1	1–4	12–5	6–7	2–7	0–0	0–1	1 / 35	25–34	42%
Grass win–loss	0–0		0–0	0–0	0–0	0–0	0–2	0–2	0–2	0–1	0–0	0–0	0 / 7	0–7	0%
Overall win–loss	0–0		1–2	0–2	1–6	4–2	4–16	18–16	24–26	7–20	0–1	0–1	1 / 87	59–92	39%
Win %	–		33%	0%	14%	67%	20%	53%	48%	26%	0%	0%	Career total: 39%		
Year-end ranking (Note: 2008: WTA ranking–1011, 2010–2013: WTA ranking–N/A, 2014: WTA ranking–590, 2015: WTA ranking–365, 2016: WTA ranking–236.)	694		202	195	153	84	113	28	43	126	706		$3,527,489		

=== Doubles ===
Current through the 2023 Wimbledon Championships.

Tournament	2017	2018	2019	2020	2021	2022	2023	2024	SR	W–L	Win%
Grand Slam tournaments
Australian Open	A	A	A	A	QF	A	1R	1R	0 / 3	3–3	50%
French Open	A	A	A	A	1R	1R	2R	A	0 / 3	1–3	25%
Wimbledon	A	A	A	NH	A	1R	1R	1R	0 / 3	0–3	0%
US Open	A	A	A	A	A	A	1R	1R	0 / 3	0–3	0%
Win–loss	0–0	0–0	0–0	0–0	3–2	0–3	1–4	0–3	0 / 12	4–12	25%
National representation
Billie Jean King Cup	WG2	A	WG2	PO		RR	F	A	0 / 2	5–3	63%
WTA 1000
Dubai / Qatar Open	A	A	A	A	A	A	A	A	0 / 0	0–0	–
Indian Wells Open	A	A	A	NH	A	A	1R	A	0 / 1	0–1	0%
Miami Open	A	A	A	NH	A	A	A	A	0 / 0	0–0	–
Madrid Open	A	A	A	NH	A	A	1R	A	0 / 1	0–1	0%
Italian Open	QF	2R	1R	1R	A	2R	1R	A	0 / 6	4–6	40%
Canadian Open	A	A	A	NH	A	1R	A	A	0 / 1	0–1	0%
Cincinnati Open	A	A	A	A	A	2R	A	A	0 / 1	1–1	50%
Guadalajara Open	NH					1R	A	A	0 / 1	0–1	0%
Wuhan Open	A	A	A	NH				A	0 / 0	0–0	–
China Open	A	A	A	NH			1R	A	0 / 1	0–1	0%
Win–loss	2–1	1–1	0–1	0–1	0–0	2–4	0–3	0–0	0 / 11	5–11	31%
Career statistics
	2017	2018	2019	2020	2021	2022	2023	2024	SR	W–L	Win%
Tournaments	1	1	2	2	4	7	6	0	Career total: 23		
Titles	0	0	0	0	0	0	0	0	Career total: 0		
Finals	0	0	0	1	0	0	0	0	Career total: 1		
Overall win–loss	3–1	1–1	1–2	5–2	4–4	3–7	2–6	0–0	0 / 23	19–23	45%
Year-end ranking (Note: 2015: WTA ranking–931, 2016: WTA ranking–n/a.)	313	480	1380	391	186	244	390	338			

== WTA Tour finals ==
=== Singles: 1 (title) ===
Legend WTA 250 (1–0)	Finals by surface Clay (1–0)

Result	W–L	Date	Tournament	Tier	Surface	Opponent	Score
Win	1–0	May 2022	Rabat Grand Prix, Morocco	WTA 250	Clay	(United States) Claire Liu	6–2, 6–1

=== Doubles: 1 (runner-up) ===
Legend WTA 250 (0–1)	Finals by surface Clay (0–1)

Result	W–L	Date	Tournament	Tier	Surface	Partner	Opponents	Score
Loss	0–1	Aug 2020	Palermo Ladies Open, Italy	International (Note: The WTA International tournaments were reclassified as WTA 250 tournaments in 2021.)	Clay	(Italy) Elisabetta Cocciaretto	(Netherlands) Arantxa Rus (Slovenia) Tamara Zidanšek	5–7, 5–7

== WTA 125 finals ==
=== Singles: 2 (1 title, 1 runner-up) ===
Result	W–L	Date	Tournament	Surface	Opponent	Score
Loss	0–1	Sep 2021	Karlsruhe Open, Germany	Clay	(Egypt) Mayar Sherif	3–6, 2–6
Win	1–1	Jul 2024	Båstad Open, Sweden	Clay	(United States) Ann Li	6–2, 6–2

== ITF Circuit finals ==
=== Singles: 18 (10 titles, 8 runner-ups) ===
Legend $100,000 tournaments (0–1) $80,000 tournaments (1–0) $60,000 tournaments (0–1) $25,000 tournaments (5–5) $10,000 tournaments (4–1)	Finals by surface Hard (0–1) Clay (10–7)

Result	W–L	Date	Tournament	Tier	Surface	Opponent	Score
Loss	0–1	Aug 2014	ITF Innsbruck, Austria	10,000	Clay	(Croatia) Iva Mekovec	6–2, 2–6, 1–6
Win	1–1	Sep 2014	ITF Pula, Italy	10,000	Clay	(Italy) Cristiana Ferrando	6–4, 6–3
Win	2–1	Sep 2014	ITF Pula, Italy	10,000	Clay	(Belgium) Marie Benoît	6–4, 6–3
Win	3–1	May 2015	ITF Pula, Italy	10,000	Clay	(Norway) Ulrikke Eikeri	6–3, 3–6, 6–1
Win	4–1	Aug 2015	Internazionale di Roma, Italy	25,000	Clay	(Switzerland) Lisa Sabino	6–1, 6–3
Win	5–1	Oct 2015	ITF Pula, Italy	10,000	Clay	(Italy) Anastasia Grymalska	7–5, 3–6, 6–1
Win	6–1	Aug 2016	ITF Bagnatica, Italy	25,000	Clay	(Poland) Katarzyna Piter	6–1, 5–7, 7–5
Loss	6–2	Sep 2016	Open de Biarritz, France	100,000	Clay	(Slovakia) Rebecca Šramková	3–6, 6–4, 1–6
Win	7–2	Oct 2016	ITF Pula, Italy	25,000	Clay	(Brazil) Beatriz Haddad Maia	6–3, 6–4
Loss	7–3	Jun 2017	Grado Tennis Cup, Italy	25,000	Clay	(Slovakia) Anna Karolína Schmiedlová	6–2, 2–6, 4–6
Win	8–3	Jun 2017	WSG Open Warsaw, Poland	25,000	Clay	(Ukraine) Olga Ianchuk	6–2, 6–4
Loss	8–4	Sep 2017	ITF Bagnatica, Italy	25,000	Clay	(Norway) Melanie Stokke	6–7^{(6)}, 3–6
Loss	8–5	Apr 2018	ITF Pula, Italy	25,000	Clay	(France) Manon Arcangioli	6–2, 2–6, 4–6
Loss	8–6	Jun 2018	Internazionali di Brescia, Italy	60,000	Clay	(Estonia) Kaia Kanepi	4–6, 3–6
Win	9–6	Sep 2019	ITF Pula, Italy	W25	Clay	(Australia) Seone Mendez	6–4, 5–7, 7–5
Loss	9–7	Oct 2019	ITF Pula, Italy	W25	Clay	(Argentina) Nadia Podoroska	6–7^{(5)}, 1–6
Win	10–7	Sep 2021	Internacional de Valencia, Spain	W80	Clay	(Hungary) Dalma Gálfi	4–6, 6–4, 6–0
Loss	10–8	Nov 2021	ITF Funchal, Portugal	W25	Hard	(China) Zheng Qinwen	3–6, 5–7

=== Doubles: 3 (2 titles, 1 runner-up) ===
Legend $15,000 tournaments (2–1)	Finals by surface Clay (2–1)

Result	W–L	Date	Tournament	Tier	Surface	Partner	Opponents	Score
Win	1–0	Aug 2009	ITF Pesaro, Italy	10,000	Clay	(Italy) Anastasia Grymalska	(Italy) Alice Balducci (Italy) Federica di Sarra	6–2, 6–2
Loss	1–1	Mar 2015	ITF Le Havre, France	10,000	Clay (i)	(Italy) Alice Matteucci	(Netherlands) Erika Vogelsang (Netherlands) Mandy Wagemaker	1–6, 6–1, [6–10]
Win	2–1	Apr 2015	ITF Pula, Italy	10,000	Clay	(Italy) Alice Matteucci	(Italy) Giorgia Marchetti (Italy) Anna-Giulia Remondina	6–2, 6–3

== Head-to-head statistics ==
=== Record against top 10 players ===
- She has a 4–7 (36%) record against players who were, at the time the match was played, ranked in the top 10.

Result	W–L	Opponent	Rank	Event	Surface	Rd	Score	Rank	H2H
2019
Loss	0–1	(Netherlands) Kiki Bertens	No. 6	Charleston Open, United States	Clay (g)	2R	2–6, 1–6	No. 159	
2020
Win	1–1	(Netherlands) Kiki Bertens	No. 8	French Open, France	Clay	4R	6–4, 6–4	No. 159	
2022
Loss	1–2	(Spain) Paula Badosa	No. 6	Australian Open, Australia	Hard	2R	0–6, 3–6	No. 111	
Win	2–2	(Spain) Garbiñe Muguruza	No. 10	Rabat Grand Prix, Morocco	Clay	2R	2–6, 6–4, 6–1	No. 85	
Loss	2–3	(United States) Coco Gauff	No. 7	Guadalajara Open, Mexico	Hard	3R	0–6, 3–6	No. 28	
2023
Loss	2–4	(Poland) Iga Świątek	No. 1	United Cup, Australia	Hard	PO	2–6, 4–6	No. 27	
Win	3–4	(Greece) Maria Sakkari	No. 6	United Cup, Australia	Hard	SF	6–3, 6–7^{(4–7)}, 7–5	No. 27	
Loss	3–5	(United States) Jessica Pegula	No. 3	United Cup, Australia	Hard	F	4–6, 2–6	No. 27	
Loss	3–6	(Kazakhstan) Elena Rybakina	No. 7	Miami Open, United States	Hard	QF	3–6, 0–6	No. 24	
Loss	3–7	(United States) Jessica Pegula	No. 3	Madrid Open, Spain	Clay	4R	3–6, 6–2, 3–6	No. 20	
Win	4–7	(Tunisia) Ons Jabeur	No. 7	Guadalajara Open, Mexico	Hard	3R	6–7^{(4–7)}, 7–5, 6–3	No. 54	

== Longest winning streak ==
=== 10-match win streak (2022) ===
#	Tournament	Category	Start date	Surface	Rd	Opponent	Rank	Score	MTR
–	Italian Open	WTA 1000	9 May 2022	Clay	1R	(China) Zhang Shuai	No. 42	4–6, 2–6	No. 82
1	Morocco Open	WTA 250	15 May 2022	Clay	1R	(China) You Xiaodi (Q)	No. 295	6–0, 6–4	No. 85
2	Morocco Open	WTA 250	15 May 2022	Clay	2R	(Spain) Garbiñe Muguruza (1)	No. 10	2–6, 6–4, 6–1	No. 85
3	Morocco Open	WTA 250	15 May 2022	Clay	QF	(Netherlands) Arantxa Rus (7)	No. 76	7–6^{(7–4)}, 6–3	No. 85
4	Morocco Open	WTA 250	15 May 2022	Clay	SF	(Italy) Lucia Bronzetti	No. 83	6–3, 6–3	No. 85
5	Morocco Open	WTA 250	15 May 2022	Clay	W	(United States) Claire Liu	No. 92	6–2, 6–1	No. 85
6	French Open	Grand Slam	22 May 2022	Clay	1R	(United Kingdom) Harriet Dart	No. 111	6–0, 6–2	No. 59
7	French Open	Grand Slam	22 May 2022	Clay	2R	(Poland) Magda Linette	No. 52	6–3, 6–2	No. 59
8	French Open	Grand Slam	22 May 2022	Clay	3R	(Australia) Daria Saville (WC)	No. 127	6–3, 6–4	No. 59
9	French Open	Grand Slam	22 May 2022	Clay	4R	(Belarus) Aliaksandra Sasnovich	No. 47	7–6^{(12–10)}, 7–5	No. 59
10	French Open	Grand Slam	22 May 2022	Clay	QF	(Canada) Leylah Fernandez (17)	No. 18	6–2, 6–7^{(3–7)}, 6–3	No. 59
–	French Open	Grand Slam	22 May 2022	Clay	SF	(United States) Coco Gauff (18)	No. 23	3–6, 1–6	No. 59
