= 2022 Grand Prix SAR La Princesse Lalla Meryem – Singles =

Singles
- 2022 Grand Prix SAR La Princesse Lalla Meryem

Final
- Champion: (Italy) Martina Trevisan
- Runner-up: (United States) Claire Liu
- Score: 6–2, 6–1

Details
- Draw: 32 (4 Q / 3 WC )
- Seeds: 8

Events
Singles	Doubles
- Morocco Open

Martina Trevisan defeated Claire Liu in the final, 6–2, 6–1 to win the singles tennis title at the 2022 Morocco Open. It was her maiden WTA Tour title.

Maria Sakkari was the defending champion when the tournament was last held in 2019, but she chose not to participate.

== Seeds ==
1. (Spain) Garbiñe Muguruza (second round)
2. (Australia) Ajla Tomljanović (quarterfinals, retired)
3. (Spain) Nuria Párrizas Díaz (quarterfinals)
4. (Egypt) Mayar Sherif (second round)
5. (Hungary) Anna Bondár (semifinals, withdrew)
6. (China) Zheng Qinwen (withdrew)
7. (Netherlands) Arantxa Rus (quarterfinals)
8. Anna Kalinskaya (first round)
9. (Sweden) Rebecca Peterson (first round)

== Draw ==
Key

- Q = Qualifier
- WC = Wild card
- LL = Lucky loser
- Alt = Alternate
- ITF = ITF entry
- PR = Protected ranking
- SR = Special ranking
- SE = Special exempt
- JE = Junior exempt
- JR = Junior Accelerator Programme entrant
- CO = College Accelerator Programme entrant
- NG = Next Gen Accelerator Program entrant
- w/o = Walkover
- r = Retired
- d = Defaulted

=== Finals ===
Semifinals
(Italy) Martina Trevisan	6	6
(Italy) Lucia Bronzetti	3	3
(United States) Claire Liu	w/o
5	(Hungary) Anna Bondár

Final
(Italy) Martina Trevisan	6	6
(United States) Claire Liu	2	1

=== Top half ===
First round
1/WC	(Spain) G Muguruza	6	6
LL	(Kazakhstan) A Danilina	3	2
Q	(China) X You	0	4
(Italy) M Trevisan	6	6
(Norway) U Eikeri	2	5
(Hungary) D Gálfi	6	7
WC	(Switzerland) L Sun	3	0
7	(Netherlands) A Rus	6	6
3	(Spain) N Párrizas Díaz	7^{7}	1	6
Q	(Canada) C Zhao	6^{4}	6	2
(France) K Mladenovic	6	3	7^{9}
LL	(France) T Andrianjafitrimo	3	6	6^{7}
(Hungary) P Udvardy	6^{4}	6^{3}
(France) C Burel	7^{7}	7^{7}
(Italy) L Bronzetti	6	6^{5}	6
8	A Kalinskaya	3	7^{7}	3

Second round
1/WC	(Spain) G Muguruza	6	4	1
(Italy) M Trevisan	2	6	6
(Hungary) D Gálfi	4	2
7	(Netherlands) A Rus	6	6
3	(Spain) N Párrizas Díaz	4	6	6
(France) K Mladenovic	6	3	0
(France) C Burel	3	2
(Italy) L Bronzetti	6	6

Quarterfinals
(Italy) M Trevisan	7^{7}	6
7	(Netherlands) A Rus	6^{4}	3
3	(Spain) N Párrizas Díaz	1	6	6^{5}
(Italy) L Bronzetti	6	3	7^{7}

Semifinals
(Italy) M Trevisan	6	6
(Italy) L Bronzetti	3	3

=== Bottom half ===
First round
9	(Sweden) R Peterson	0	6	5
WC	(Croatia) P Marčinko	6	2	7
(Mexico) M Zacarías	6	5	4
(Australia) A Sharma	1	7	6
K Rakhimova	4	3
(United States) C Liu	6	6
(France) C Paquet	0	2
4	(Egypt) M Sherif	6	6
5	(Hungary) A Bondár	6	3	7
Q	(Italy) C Ferrando	4	6	5
(Slovakia) K Kučová	6	6
(United States) C Harrison	2	0
(Slovakia) AK Schmiedlová	6	6
Q	E Reyngold	1	2
(Spain) I Burillo Escorihuela	2	1
2	(Australia) A Tomljanović	6	6

Second round
WC	(Croatia) P Marčinko	7	3	3
(Australia) A Sharma	5	6	6
(United States) C Liu	4	7^{7}	6
4	(Egypt) M Sherif	6	6^{5}	1
5	(Hungary) A Bondár	6	6
(Slovakia) K Kučová	3	3
(Slovakia) AK Schmiedlová	5	2
2	(Australia) A Tomljanović	7	6

Quarterfinals
(Australia) A Sharma	4	1
(United States) C Liu	6	6
5	(Hungary) A Bondár	5
2	(Australia) A Tomljanović	1^{r}

Semifinals
(United States) C Liu	w/o
5	(Hungary) A Bondár

== Qualifying ==
=== Seeds ===
1. (France) Tessah Andrianjafitrimo (qualifying competition, lucky loser)
2. (United States) Catherine Harrison (moved to main draw)
3. (Italy) Cristiana Ferrando (qualified)
4. (Spain) Yvonne Cavallé Reimers (qualifying competition)
5. (China) You Xiaodi (qualified)
6. (Canada) Carol Zhao (qualified)
7. (Burundi) Sada Nahimana (first round)
8. Ekaterina Kazionova (first round)

=== Qualifiers ===
1. (Canada) Carol Zhao
2. Ekaterina Reyngold
3. (Italy) Cristiana Ferrando
4. (China) You Xiaodi

=== Lucky losers ===
1. (France) Tessah Andrianjafitrimo
2. (Kazakhstan) Anna Danilina

=== Qualifying draw ===
==== First qualifier ====
First round
1	(France) Tessah Andrianjafitrimo	4	7	6
Ekaterina Yashina	6	5	1
WC	(Morocco) Yasmine Kabbaj	6	5	3
6	(Canada) Carol Zhao	3	7	6

Qualifying competition
1	(France) Tessah Andrianjafitrimo	5	6	3
6	(Canada) Carol Zhao	7	4	6

==== Second qualifier ====
First round
Alt	(Japan) Ena Shibahara	2	3
(Kazakhstan) Anna Danilina	6	6
Ekaterina Reyngold	6	6
7	(Burundi) Sada Nahimana	3	4

Qualifying competition
(Kazakhstan) Anna Danilina	5	1
Ekaterina Reyngold	7	6

==== Third qualifier ====
First round
3	(Italy) Cristiana Ferrando	6	6
(Poland) Paula Kania-Choduń	1	0
(United Kingdom) Tara Moore	1	6	6
8	Ekaterina Kazionova	6	4	0

Qualifying competition
3	(Italy) Cristiana Ferrando	6	6
(United Kingdom) Tara Moore	3	2

==== Fourth qualifier ====
First round
4	(Spain) Yvonne Cavallé Reimers	6	7
Amina Anshba	3	5
WC	(United States) Ingrid Neel	6^{4}	5
5	(China) You Xiaodi	7^{7}	7

Qualifying competition
4	(Spain) Yvonne Cavallé Reimers	2	4
5	(China) You Xiaodi	6	6
