= Lya Isabel Fernández Olivares =

Mexican tennis player

- Country (sports): Mexico
- Born: 24 July 2007 (age 19)
- Prize money: $38,536

Singles
- Career record: 71–56
- Career titles: 1 ITF
- Highest ranking: No. 702 (14 November 2022)
- Current ranking: No. 974 (28 September 2026)

Doubles
- Career record: 14–28
- Highest ranking: No. 883 (14 September 2026)
- Current ranking: No. 905 (28 September 2026)
- Last updated on: 29 September 2026.

Lya Isabel Fernández Olivares (born 24 July 2007) is a Mexican tennis player.

She reached a best singles ranking of world No. 702 in November 2022. On the ITF World Tour, she has won one title in singles.

== Career ==
In 2022, Fernández Olivares won her first title in singles in Cancún, Mexico.

Fernández Olivares made her WTA Tour singles debut at the 2023 Guadalajara Open where she entered the main draw as a wildcard player, losing in the first round to Hailey Baptiste.

== ITF Circuit finals ==
=== Singles: 3 (1 title, 2 runner-ups) ===
Legend W15 tournaments (1–2)	Finals by surface Hard (1–2)

Result	W–L	Date	Tournament	Tier	Surface	Opponent	Score
Loss	0–1	Jul 2022	ITF Cancún, Mexico	W15	Hard	(Mexico) Victoria Rodríguez	3–6, 1–6
Win	1–1	Jul 2022	ITF Cancún, Mexico	W15	Hard	(France) Sophia Biolay	6–3, 6–2
Loss	1–2	Aug 2022	ITF Cancún, Mexico	W15	Hard	(United States) Eryn Cayetano	2–6, 2–6

=== Doubles: 2 (2 runner-ups) ===
Legend W15 tournaments	Finals by surface Hard (0–2)

Result	W–L	Date	Tournament	Tier	Surface	Partner	Opponents	Score
Loss	0–1	Mar 2026	ITF Huamantla, Mexico	W15	Hard	(Curaçao) Sarah Victoria Nita	(Venezuela) Sofía Elena Cabezas Domínguez (Italy) Miriana Tona	3–6, 3–6
Loss	0–2	May 2026	ITF Monastir, Tunisia	W15	Hard	(Argentina) Luciana Moyano	(Italy) Lavinia Luciano (Italy) Matilde Mariani	walkover
