= Guadalajara Open Akron =

Guadalajara Open
- 2026 Guadalajara Open

WTA Tour
- Event name: Guadalajara Open presented by Santander (2026-), Guadalajara Open Akron (2022-2025)
- Tour: WTA Tour
- Founded: 2022
- Location: Zapopan, Jalisco, Mexico
- Venue: Centro Panamericano de Tenis
- Category: WTA 1000 (2022-2023); WTA 500 (2024-present)
- Surface: Hard – outdoors
- Draw: 28S / 16D
- Prize money: US$1,206,446 (2026)
- Website: guadalajaraopen.com

Current champions (2026)
- Singles: (United States) Iva Jovic
- Doubles: (Spain) Cristina Bucșa (United States) Nicole Melichar-Martinez

The Guadalajara Open (also known as the GDL Open presented by Santander for sponsorship reasons) is a professional women's tennis tournament held in Zapopan, Mexico (Guadalajara metro area). It takes place on outdoor hardcourts at the Panamerican Tennis Center, and is held in September. It was part of the WTA 1000 tournaments on the WTA Tour from 2022 until 2023, due to the vacancy in the calendar. After successfully staging the 2021 WTA Finals in Guadalajara, the WTA rewarded the tournament organizers with the 1000-level event. The tournament was held as a replacement for the Wuhan Open. In 2024, the tournament was downgraded to a WTA 500 as Wuhan made its return to the Tour.

== Finals ==
=== Singles ===
Year	Champion	Runner-up	Score
↓ WTA 1000 tournament ↓
2022	(United States) Jessica Pegula	(Greece) Maria Sakkari	6–2, 6–3
2023	(Greece) Maria Sakkari	(United States) Caroline Dolehide	7–5, 6–3
↓ WTA 500 tournament ↓
2024	(Poland) Magdalena Fręch	(Australia) Olivia Gadecki	7–6^{(7–5)}, 6–4
2025	(United States) Iva Jovic	(Colombia) Emiliana Arango	6–4, 6–1
2026	(United States) Iva Jovic (2)	(United States) Peyton Stearns	6–4, 6–2

=== Doubles ===
Year	Champions	Runners-up	Score
↓ WTA 1000 tournament ↓
2022	(Australia) Storm Sanders (Brazil) Luisa Stefani	(Kazakhstan) Anna Danilina (Brazil) Beatriz Haddad Maia	7–6^{(7–4)}, 6–7^{(2–7)}, [10–8]
2023	(Australia) Storm Hunter (2) (Belgium) Elise Mertens	(Canada) Gabriela Dabrowski (New Zealand) Erin Routliffe	3–6, 6–2, [10–4]
↓ WTA 500 tournament ↓
2024	(Kazakhstan) Anna Danilina; Irina Khromacheva	(Georgia (country)) Oksana Kalashnikova; Kamilla Rakhimova	2–6, 7–5, [10–7]
2025	Irina Khromacheva (2) (United States) Nicole Melichar-Martinez	(Mexico) Giuliana Olmos (Indonesia) Aldila Sutjiadi	6–3, 6–4
2026	(Spain) Cristina Bucșa (United States) Nicole Melichar-Martinez (2)	(Japan) Momoko Kobori (Thailand) Peangtarn Plipuech	6–2, 5–7, [10–5]

== See also ==
- Abierto Zapopan
- Jalisco Open
- Guadalajara Open
