= 2025 Abierto Tampico – Singles =

Singles
- 2025 Abierto Tampico

Final
- Champion: (Belgium) Hanne Vandewinkel
- Runner-up: (Canada) Cadence Brace
- Score: 6–4, 6–3

Details
- Draw: 32 (4 WC)
- Seeds: 8

Events
Singles	Doubles
← 2024 ·	Abierto Tampico	· 2026 →

Hanne Vandewinkel won the title, defeating Cadence Brace 6–4, 6–3 in the final.

Marina Stakusic was the defending champion but lost in the quarterfinals to Vandewinkel.

== Seeds ==
1. (United States) Caroline Dolehide (second round)
2. (Croatia) Petra Marčinko (quarterfinals)
3. (United States) Varvara Lepchenko (first round)
4. (Canada) Marina Stakusic (quarterfinals)
5. (Belgium) Hanne Vandewinkel (champion)
6. (Canada) Cadence Brace (final)
7. (Canada) Kayla Cross (second round)
8. (United Kingdom) Harriet Dart (semifinals, retired)

== Draw ==
=== Key ===
- Q = Qualifier
- WC = Wild card
- LL = Lucky loser
- Alt = Alternate
- ITF = ITF entry
- PR = Protected ranking
- SR = Special ranking
- SE = Special exempt
- JE = Junior exempt
- JR = Junior Accelerator Programme entrant
- CO = College Accelerator Programme entrant
- NG = Next Gen Accelerator Program entrant
- w/o = Walkover
- r = Retired
- d = Defaulted

=== Finals ===
Semifinals
(Italy) Jessica Pieri	6	5	1
6	(Canada) Cadence Brace	3	7	6
5	(Belgium) Hanne Vandewinkel	6	2
8	(United Kingdom) Harriet Dart	1	2^{r}

Final
6	(Canada) Cadence Brace	4	3
5	(Belgium) Hanne Vandewinkel	6	6

=== Top half ===
First round
1/WC	(United States) C Dolehide	2	6	5
(Italy) D Cherubini	6	2	0^{r}
Q	(United States) H Giavara	6^{7}	6^{5}
Q	(United States) K Scott	7^{9}	7^{7}
(Italy) J Pieri	6	6
WC	(Mexico) M Portillo Ramírez	2	1
(United States) E Bektas	4	2
7	(Canada) K Cross	6	6
3	(United States) V Lepchenko	6^{3}	3
(United States) E Kalieva	7^{7}	6
(United States) L Ma	7^{7}	6
(United Kingdom) A Rajecki	6^{5}	1
Q	(Slovenia) K Novak	4	3
(Switzerland) L Küng	6	6
(United States) H Chang	3	4
6	(Canada) C Brace	6	6

Second round
1/WC	(United States) C Dolehide	6	3	3
Q	(United States) K Scott	4	6	6
(Italy) J Pieri	6	6
7	(Canada) K Cross	4	3
(United States) E Kalieva	1
(United States) L Ma	3^{r}
(Switzerland) L Küng	2	1
6	(Canada) C Brace	6	6

Quarterfinals
Q	(United States) K Scott	6	1	2
(Italy) J Pieri	3	6	6
(United States) E Kalieva	3	6	3
6	(Canada) C Brace	6	4	6

Semifinals
(Italy) J Pieri	6	5	1
6	(Canada) C Brace	3	7	6

=== Bottom half ===
First round
5	(Belgium) H Vandewinkel	6	6
(United States) E Mandlik	2	2
WC	(Mexico) J Hinojosa Gómez	2	3
(France) T Andrianjafitrimo	6	6
(Romania) G Lee	7	3	3
A Tikhonova	5	6	6
(United States) A Smith	6	1	0
4	(Canada) M Stakusic	4	6	6
8	(United Kingdom) H Dart	6	6
(Ukraine) V Strakhova	1	4
(Mexico) V Rodríguez	2	6^{4}
Q	(Canada) D Plekhanova	6	7^{7}
(India) S Yamalapalli	6	6
WC	(United States) S Stephens	2	2
(Bulgaria) L Karatancheva	2	2
2	(Croatia) P Marčinko	6	6

Second round
5	(Belgium) H Vandewinkel	6	6
(France) T Andrianjafitrimo	0	2
A Tikhonova	2	6^{5}
4	(Canada) M Stakusic	6	7^{7}
8	(United Kingdom) H Dart	4
Q	(Canada) D Plekhanova	0^{r}
(India) S Yamalapalli	5	7^{7}	1
2	(Croatia) P Marčinko	7	6^{5}	6

Quarterfinals
5	(Belgium) H Vandewinkel	6	6
4	(Canada) M Stakusic	3	3
8	(United Kingdom) H Dart	6	6
2	(Croatia) P Marčinko	4	3

Semifinals
5	(Belgium) H Vandewinkel	6	2
8	(United Kingdom) H Dart	1	2^{r}

== Qualifying ==
=== Seeds ===
1. Ekaterina Kazionova (qualifying competition)
2. (United States) Haley Giavara (qualified)
3. (Poland) Weronika Falkowska (qualifying competition)
4. (United States) Victoria Hu (first round)
5. (Canada) Dasha Plekhanova (qualified)
6. (United States) Katrina Scott (qualified)
7. (United States) Sachia Vickery (qualifying competition)
8. (United States) Usue Maitane Arconada (qualifying competition)

=== Qualifiers ===
1. (Canada) Dasha Plekhanova
2. (United States) Haley Giavara
3. (United States) Katrina Scott
4. (Slovenia) Kristina Novak

=== Qualifying draw ===
==== First qualifier ====
First round				Qualifying competition
				1	Ekaterina Kazionova	2	3
				5	(Canada) Dasha Plekhanova	6	6
	(Mexico) Sabastiani León	1	2	5	(Canada) Dasha Plekhanova	6	6
5	(Canada) Dasha Plekhanova	6	6

==== Second qualifier ====
First round				Qualifying competition
				2	(United States) Haley Giavara	7^{7}	6
				8	(United States) Usue Maitane Arconada	6^{5}	1
	(Mexico) Marián Gómez Pezuela Cano	0	0	8	(United States) Usue Maitane Arconada	6^{5}	1
8	(United States) Usue Maitane Arconada	6	6

==== Third qualifier ====
First round				Qualifying competition
				3	(Poland) Weronika Falkowska	5	5
				6	(United States) Katrina Scott	7	7
WC	(Mexico) Ana Paola González Domínguez	0	0	6	(United States) Katrina Scott	7	7
6	(United States) Katrina Scott	6	6

==== Fourth qualifier ====
First round
4	(United States) Victoria Hu	1	4
(Slovenia) Kristina Novak	6	6
(Mexico) Daniela Martínez Guerrero	0	0
7	(United States) Sachia Vickery	6	6

Qualifying competition
(Slovenia) Kristina Novak	6	6
7	(United States) Sachia Vickery	2	3
