= 2025 Abierto Tampico =

- Date: 13–18 October
- Edition: 9th
- Category: WTA 125
- Prize money: $115,000
- Surface: Hard
- Location: Tampico, Mexico
- Venue: Centro Libanés Mexicano de Tampico

Champions

Singles
- (Belgium) Hanne Vandewinkel

Doubles
- (Canada) Kayla Cross / (United Kingdom) Amelia Rajecki
← 2024 ·	Abierto Tampico	· 2026 →

The 2025 Abierto Tampico was a professional women's tennis tournament played on outdoor hard courts. It was the ninth edition of the tournament and a part of 2025 WTA 125 tournaments. It took place at the Centro Libanés Mexicano de Tampico in Tampico, Mexico, between 13 and 18 October 2025.

== Singles entrants ==
=== Seeds ===
Country	Player	Rank^{1}	Seed
USA	Caroline Dolehide	84	1
CRO	Petra Marčinko	124	2
USA	Varvara Lepchenko	148	3
CAN	Marina Stakusic	151	4
BEL	Hanne Vandewinkel	162	5
CAN	Cadence Brace	221	6
CAN	Kayla Cross	224	7
GBR	Harriet Dart	231	8

- ^{1} Rankings as of 6 October 2025.

=== Other entrants ===
The following players received a wildcard into the singles main draw:

- (United States) Caroline Dolehide
- (Mexico) Jéssica Hinojosa Gómez
- (Mexico) María Portillo Ramírez
- (United States) Sloane Stephens

The following players received entry from the qualifying draw:

- (United States) Haley Giavara
- (Slovenia) Kristina Novak
- (Canada) Dasha Plekhanova
- (United States) Katrina Scott

=== Withdrawals ===
Before the tournament

- (France) Julie Belgraver → replaced by (India) Sahaja Yamalapalli
- (Kazakhstan) Zhibek Kulambayeva → replaced by (United States) Emina Bektas
- (Canada) Rebecca Marino → replaced by (United States) Lea Ma
- (Czech Republic) Barbora Palicová → replaced by Anastasia Tikhonova
- (Mexico) Ana Sofía Sánchez → replaced by (Mexico) Victoria Rodríguez

== Doubles entrants ==
=== Seeds ===
Country	Player	Country	Player	Rank^{1}	Seed
GBR	Harriet Dart		Anastasia Tikhonova	226	1
BUL	Lia Karatantcheva	UKR	Valeriya Strakhova	355	2
CAN	Kayla Cross	GBR	Amelia Rajecki	386	3
POL	Weronika Falkowska	SLO	Kristina Novak	408	4

- ^{1} Rankings as of 6 October 2025.

=== Other entrants ===
The following pair received a wildcard into the doubles main draw:

- (Mexico) Ana Paola González Domínguez / (Mexico) Daniela Martínez Guerrero

== Champions ==
=== Singles ===
- (Belgium) Hanne Vandewinkel def. (Canada) Cadence Brace 6–4, 6–3

=== Doubles ===
- (Canada) Kayla Cross / (United Kingdom) Amelia Rajecki def. (Poland) Weronika Falkowska / (Slovenia) Kristina Novak 6–4, 6–3
