= 2026 ENKA Ladies Open =

- Date: 13–19 July 2026
- Edition: 1st
- Category: WTA 125
- Prize money: $115,000
- Surface: Hard
- Location: Istanbul, Turkey

Champions

Singles
- (Thailand) Lanlana Tararudee

Doubles
- (Japan) Ena Shibahara / Vera Zvonareva
- ENKA Ladies Open

The 2026 ENKA Open was a professional women's tennis tournament played on outdoor hardcourts. It was the first edition of the tournament, as part of the 2026 WTA 125 tournaments. It took place in Istanbul, Turkey between 13 and 19 July 2026.

== Singles main-draw entrants ==
=== Seeds ===
Country	Player	Rank^{1}	Seed
	Anastasia Zakharova	85	1
THA	Lanlana Tararudee	99	2
BEL	Hanne Vandewinkel	103	3
CHN	Yuan Yue	121	4
	Polina Iatcenko	157	5
CZE	Linda Fruhvirtová	162	6
SUI	Susan Bandecchi	168	7
	Tatiana Prozorova	171	8

- ^{1} Rankings are as of 7 July 2026.

=== Other entrants ===
The following players received wildcards into the singles main draw:

- (Turkey) Çağla Büyükakçay
- (Turkey) Deniz Dilek
- (Turkey) İrem Kurt
- (United States) Kristina Penickova

The following player received entry into the main draw through protected ranking:

- (India) Karman Thandi
- Mariia Tkacheva

The following players received entry from the qualifying draw:

- (Poland) Weronika Falkowska
- Daria Khomutsianskaya
- (Indonesia) Priska Nugroho
- (Bulgaria) Isabella Shinikova

=== Withdrawals ===
Before the tournament

- (Canada) Bianca Andreescu → replaced by (Japan) Kyōka Okamura
- (Chinese Taipei) Joanna Garland → replaced by (China) Bai Zhuoxuan
- (Poland) Linda Klimovičová → replaced by Mariia Tkacheva
- (Ukraine) Veronika Podrez → replaced by Vera Zvonareva
- (China) Tian Fangran → replaced by (China) Gao Xinyu

=== Retirement ===
- (France) Harmony Tan (left knee injury)

== Doubles entrants ==
=== Seeds ===
Country	Player	Country	Player	Rank	Seed
JPN	Ena Shibahara		Vera Zvonareva	96	1
CZE	Lucie Havlíčková	CZE	Gabriela Knutson	397	2
USA	Carol Young Suh Lee	CZE	Vendula Valdmannová	402	3
CHN	Huang Yujia	CHN	Zhang Ying	466	4

- Rankings as of 7 July 2026.

=== Other entrants ===
The following pair received a wildcard into the doubles main draw:

- ~~(Turkey) Ayşe Bal / (Turkey) Minel Naz Kaynak~~
- (Turkey) Irmak Öztürk / (Turkey) Melis Yıldırım

=== Withdrawals ===
Before the tournament

- (Turkey) Ayşe Bal / (Turkey) Minel Naz Kaynak (Kaynak - maximum wildcards reached)

During the tournament

- (Czech Republic) Lucie Havlíčková / (Czech Republic) Gabriela Knutson (Havlíčková- wrist injury)

== Champions ==
=== Singles ===
- (Thailand) Lanlana Tararudee def. (Belgium) Hanne Vandewinkel 6–4, 4–6, 6–3

=== Doubles ===
- (Japan) Ena Shibahara / Vera Zvonareva def. Tatiana Prozorova / Alexandra Shubladze 6–3, 3–6, [10–8]
