= 2026 ENKA Ladies Open – Doubles =

Doubles
- 2026 ENKA Ladies Open

Final
- Champions: (Japan) Ena Shibahara; Vera Zvonareva
- Runners-up: Tatiana Prozorova; Alexandra Shubladze
- Score: 6–3, 3–6, [10–8]

Details
- Draw: 16 (1WC)
- Seeds: 4

Events
| Singles | Doubles |
- ENKA Ladies Open

Ena Shibahara and Vera Zvonareva won the title, defeating Tatiana Prozorova and Alexandra Shubladze 6–3, 3–6, [10–8] in the final.

This was the first edition of the tournament.

== Seeds ==
1. (Japan) Ena Shibahara / Vera Zvonareva (champions)
2. (Czech Republic) Lucie Havlíčková / (Czech Republic) Gabriela Knutson (quarterfinals, withdrew)
3. (United States) Carol Young Suh Lee / (Czech Republic) Vendula Valdmannová (first round)
4. (China) Huang Yujia / (China) Zhang Ying (quarterfinals)

== Draw ==
Key

- Q = Qualifier
- WC = Wild card
- LL = Lucky loser
- Alt = Alternate
- ITF = ITF entry
- PR = Protected ranking
- SR = Special ranking
- SE = Special exempt
- JE = Junior exempt
- JR = Junior Accelerator Programme entrant
- CO = College Accelerator Programme entrant
- NG = Next Gen Accelerator Program entrant
- w/o = Walkover
- r = Retired
- d = Defaulted

=== Draw ===
First round
1 | (Japan) E Shibahara; V Zvonareva | 6 | 3 | [10]
(Serbia) E Milovanović (Slovenia) K Novak | 1 | 6 | [6]
3 | (United States) CYS Lee (Czech Republic) V Valdmannová | 4 | 6 | [9]
A Falei; P Iatcenko | 6 | 2 | [11]
WC | (Turkey) I Öztürk (Turkey) M Yıldırım | 2 | 1
(Croatia) M Dražić (Bulgaria) I Shinikova | 6 | 6
(Indonesia) P Nugroho; V Panshina | 6 | 6
(Japan) R Saigo (Japan) Y Saigo | 3 | 1
D Khomutsianskaya; D Zelinskaya | 2 | 2
4 | (China) Y Huang (China) Y Zhang | 6 | 6
(Poland) W Falkowska; M Tkacheva | 3 | 4
T Prozorova; A Shubladze | 6 | 6
(Turkey) D Dilek (Turkey) D Türkmen | 4 | 4
2 | (Czech Republic) L Havlíčková (Czech Republic) G Knutson | 6 | 6

Quarterfinals
1 | (Japan) E Shibahara; V Zvonareva | 6 | 6
(Turkey) İ Kurt (Turkey) D Söke | 1 | 1
A Falei; P Iatcenko | 4 | 7^{8} | [11]
(Croatia) M Dražić (Bulgaria) I Shinikova | 6 | 6^{6} | [9]
(Indonesia) P Nugroho; V Panshina | 6^{2} | 7 | [12]
4 | (China) Y Huang (China) Y Zhang | 7^{7} | 5 | [10]
T Prozorova; A Shubladze | w/o
2 | (Czech Republic) L Havlíčková (Czech Republic) G Knutson

Semifinals
1 | (Japan) E Shibahara; V Zvonareva | 6 | 4 | [10]
A Falei; P Iatcenko | 2 | 6 | [7]
(Indonesia) P Nugroho; V Panshina | 4 | 2
T Prozorova; A Shubladze | 6 | 6

Final
1 | (Japan) E Shibahara; V Zvonareva | 6 | 3 | [10]
T Prozorova; A Shubladze | 3 | 6 | [8]
