= 2025 Abierto Tampico – Doubles =

Doubles
- 2025 Abierto Tampico

Final
- Champions: (Canada) Kayla Cross (United Kingdom) Amelia Rajecki
- Runners-up: (Poland) Weronika Falkowska (Slovenia) Kristina Novak
- Score: 6–4, 6–3

Details
- Draw: 14 (1WC)
- Seeds: 4

Events
Singles	Doubles
← 2024 ·	Abierto Tampico	· 2026 →

Kayla Cross and Amelia Rajecki won the title, defeating Weronika Falkowska and Kristina Novak 6–4, 6–3 in the final.

Carmen Corley and Rebecca Marino were the reigning champions but did not participate this year.

== Seeds ==
1. (United Kingdom) Harriet Dart / Anastasia Tikhonova (semifinals, withdrew)
2. (Bulgaria) Lia Karatancheva / (Ukraine) Valeriya Strakhova (quarterfinals)
3. (Canada) Kayla Cross / (United Kingdom) Amelia Rajecki (champions)
4. (Poland) Weronika Falkowska / (Slovenia) Kristina Novak (final)

== Draw ==
Key

- Q = Qualifier
- WC = Wild card
- LL = Lucky loser
- Alt = Alternate
- ITF = ITF entry
- PR = Protected ranking
- SR = Special ranking
- SE = Special exempt
- JE = Junior exempt
- JR = Junior Accelerator Programme entrant
- CO = College Accelerator Programme entrant
- NG = Next Gen Accelerator Program entrant
- w/o = Walkover
- r = Retired
- d = Defaulted

=== Draw ===
First round
(Mexico) M Portillo Ramírez (Mexico) V Rodríguez	6	6
(Mexico) S Leon (United States) S Vickery	2	2
4	(Poland) W Falkowska (Slovenia) K Novak	3	7	[10]
E Kazionova (Switzerland) L Küng	6	5	[7]
(United States) E Kalieva (United States) A Smith	6	6
(United States) H Giavara (United States) V Hu	1	3
WC	(Mexico) AP González Domínguez (Mexico) D Martínez Guerrero	6	1	[4]
(Canada) C Brace (Mexico) M Gómez Pezuela Cano	4	6	[10]
(Australia) E Bolton (United States) C Harrison	3	5
3	(Canada) K Cross (United Kingdom) A Rajecki	6	7
(United States) UM Arconada (United States) K Scott	5	2
(Mexico) J Hinojosa Gómez (India) S Yamalapalli	7	6

Quarterfinals
1	(United Kingdom) H Dart; A Tikhonova	7	6
(Mexico) M Portillo Ramírez (Mexico) V Rodríguez	5	3
4	(Poland) W Falkowska (Slovenia) K Novak	7^{11}	6
(United States) E Kalieva (United States) A Smith	6^{9}	3
(Canada) C Brace (Mexico) M Gómez Pezuela Cano	6	3	[4]
3	(Canada) K Cross (United Kingdom) A Rajecki	3	6	[10]
(Mexico) J Hinojosa Gómez (India) S Yamalapalli	6	7
2	(Bulgaria) L Karatancheva (Ukraine) V Strakhova	1	5

Semifinals
1	(United Kingdom) H Dart; A Tikhonova
4	(Poland) W Falkowska (Slovenia) K Novak	w/o
3	(Canada) K Cross (United Kingdom) A Rajecki	6	6
(Mexico) J Hinojosa Gómez (India) S Yamalapalli	0	2

Final
4	(Poland) W Falkowska (Slovenia) K Novak	4	3
3	(Canada) K Cross (United Kingdom) A Rajecki	6	6
