= 2026 ENKA Ladies Open – Singles =

Singles
- 2026 ENKA Ladies Open

Final
- Champion: (Thailand) Lanlana Tararudee
- Runner-up: (Belgium) Hanne Vandewinkel
- Score: 6–4, 4–6, 6–3

Details
- Draw: 32 (4Q / 4WC)
- Seeds: 8

Events
Singles	Doubles
- ENKA Ladies Open

Lanlana Tararudee won the title, defeating Hanne Vandewinkel 6–4, 4–6, 6–3 in the final.

This was the first edition of the tournament.

== Seeds ==
1. Anastasia Zakharova (semifinals)
2. (Thailand) Lanlana Tararudee (champion)
3. (Belgium) Hanne Vandewinkel (final)
4. (China) Yuan Yue (first round)
5. Polina Iatcenko (first round)
6. (Czech Republic) Linda Fruhvirtová (first round)
7. (Switzerland) Susan Bandecchi (first round)
8. Tatiana Prozorova (quarterfinals)

== Draw ==
Key

- Q = Qualifier
- WC = Wild card
- LL = Lucky loser
- Alt = Alternate
- ITF = ITF entry
- PR = Protected ranking
- SR = Special ranking
- SE = Special exempt
- JE = Junior exempt
- JR = Junior Accelerator Programme entrant
- CO = College Accelerator Programme entrant
- NG = Next Gen Accelerator Program entrant
- w/o = Walkover
- r = Retired
- d = Defaulted

=== Finals ===
Semifinals
1	Anastasia Zakharova	3	3
3	(Belgium) Hanne Vandewinkel	6	6
(Czech Republic) Vendula Valdmannová	2	0
2	(Thailand) Lanlana Tararudee	6	6

Final
3	(Belgium) Hanne Vandewinkel	4	6	3
2	(Thailand) Lanlana Tararudee	6	4	6

=== Top half ===
First round
1	A Zakharova	6	3	6
PR	M Tkacheva	4	6	4
A Shubladze	7	7^{7}
Q	(Bulgaria) I Shinikova	5	6^{4}
Q	D Khomutsianskaya	6	6
Q	(Indonesia) P Nugroho	4	1
(China) Z Bai	3	1
8	T Prozorova	6	6
3	(Belgium) H Vandewinkel	6	6
(United States) CYS Lee	3	3
WC	(Turkey) D Dilek	7	6^{6}	2
Q	(Poland) W Falkowska	5	7^{8}	6
(France) H Tan	6^{3}	6	6
(Czech Republic) L Havlíčková	7^{7}	3	3
A Gasanova	7^{7}	6
7	(Switzerland) S Bandecchi	6^{3}	4

Second round
1	A Zakharova	7^{8}	7^{7}
A Shubladze	6^{6}	6^{2}
Q	D Khomutsianskaya	4	3
8	T Prozorova	6	6
3	(Belgium) H Vandewinkel	6	3	6
Q	(Poland) W Falkowska	4	6	4
(France) H Tan	6	6
A Gasanova	1	4

Quarterfinals
1	A Zakharova	6	6
8	T Prozorova	3	3
3	(Belgium) H Vandewinkel	6	1
(France) H Tan	1	0^{r}

Semifinals
1	A Zakharova	3	3
3	(Belgium) H Vandewinkel	6	6

=== Bottom half ===
First round
6	(Czech Republic) L Fruhvirtová	6^{8}	6	3
(China) X Gao	7^{10}	4	6
(Turkey) A Aksu	5	0
(Czech Republic) V Valdmannová	7	6
WC	(United States) K Penickova	3	7^{7}	6
PR	(India) K Thandi	6	6^{4}	4
A Falei	5	6	6
4	(China) Y Yuan	7	2	2
5	P Iatcenko	3	5
V Zvonareva	6	7
(Slovakia) V Hrunčáková	6	6
WC	(Turkey) Ç Büyükakçay	0	4
(Czech Republic) G Knutson	6	4	6
WC	(Turkey) İ Kurt	4	6	0
(Japan) K Okamura	2	1
2	(Thailand) L Tararudee	6	6

Second round
(China) X Gao	4	3
(Czech Republic) V Valdmannová	6	6
WC	(United States) K Penickova	5	6	3
A Falei	7	3	6
V Zvonareva	7^{7}	6
(Slovakia) V Hrunčáková	6^{4}	3
(Czech Republic) G Knutson	6	4	1
2	(Thailand) L Tararudee	4	6	6

Quarterfinals
(Czech Republic) V Valdmannová	6	6
A Falei	2	3
V Zvonareva	3	2
2	(Thailand) L Tararudee	6	6

Semifinals
(Czech Republic) V Valdmannová	2	0
2	(Thailand) L Tararudee	6	6

== Qualifying ==
=== Seeds ===
1. (Japan) Rina Saigo (qualifying competition)
2. Daria Khomutsianskaya (qualified)
3. Varvara Panshina (qualifying competition)
4. (Bulgaria) Isabella Shinikova (qualified)
5. (Poland) Weronika Falkowska (qualified)
6. (China) Huang Yujia (qualifying competition)
7. (Indonesia) Priska Nugroho (qualified)
8. (China) Zhang Ying (qualifying competition)

=== Qualifiers ===
1. (Indonesia) Priska Nugroho
2. Daria Khomutsianskaya
3. (Poland) Weronika Falkowska
4. (Bulgaria) Isabella Shinikova

=== Qualifying draw ===
==== First qualifier ====
First round
1	(Japan) Rina Saigo	6	6
(Japan) Naoko Eto	0	0
(Turkey) Duru Söke	4	0
7	(Indonesia) Priska Nugroho	6	6

Qualifying competition
1	(Japan) Rina Saigo	4	2
7	(Indonesia) Priska Nugroho	6	6

==== Second qualifier ====
First round
2	Daria Khomutsianskaya	6	6
(India) Saumya Vig	0	0
Arina Arifullina	4	3
8	(China) Zhang Ying	6	6

Qualifying competition
2	Daria Khomutsianskaya	1	6	7
8	(China) Zhang Ying	6	4	5

==== Third qualifier ====
First round
3	Varvara Panshina	6	6
(Turkey) İlay Yörük	1	2
Daria Zelinskaya	2	4
5	(Poland) Weronika Falkowska	6	6

Qualifying competition
3	Varvara Panshina	4	4
5	(Poland) Weronika Falkowska	6	6

==== Fourth qualifier ====
First round
4	(Bulgaria) Isabella Shinikova	6	6
WC	(Turkey) Doğa Türkmen	0	1
WC	(Turkey) Ayşe Bal	6^{0}	2
6	(China) Huang Yujia	7^{7}	6

Qualifying competition
4	(Bulgaria) Isabella Shinikova	6	6
6	(China) Huang Yujia	4	2
