= 1998 ENKA Ladies Open – Doubles =

Doubles
- 1998 ENKA Ladies Open

Final
- Champions: (Germany) Meike Babel (Belgium) Laurence Courtois
- Runners-up: (Sweden) Åsa Carlsson (Argentina) Florencia Labat
- Score: 6–0, 6–2

Details
- Draw: 16
- Seeds: 4

Events
Singles	Doubles
ENKA Ladies Open

Meike Babel and Laurence Courtois won in the final 6–0, 6–2 against Åsa Carlsson and Florencia Labat in the doubles of the 1998 ENKA Ladies Open.

== Seeds ==
Champion seeds are indicated in bold text while text in italics indicates the round in which those seeds were eliminated.

1. (Belgium) Sabine Appelmans / (Belgium) Els Callens (quarterfinals)
2. (Germany) **Meike Babel** / (Belgium) **Laurence Courtois (champions)**
3. (Czech Republic) Radka Bobková / (Germany) Caroline Schneider (first round)
4. (Belarus) Olga Barabanschikova / (Slovenia) Tina Križan (quarterfinals)

== Draw ==
Key

- Q = Qualifier
- WC = Wild card
- LL = Lucky loser
- Alt = Alternate
- ITF = ITF entry
- PR = Protected ranking
- SR = Special ranking
- SE = Special exempt
- JE = Junior exempt
- JR = Junior Accelerator Programme entrant
- CO = College Accelerator Programme entrant
- NG = Next Gen Accelerator Program entrant
- w/o = Walkover
- r = Retired
- d = Defaulted

First round
1	(Belgium) **S Appelmans** (Belgium) **E Callens**	4	**6**	**7**
(France) A Cocheteux (France) É Loit	**6**	3	5
(Netherlands) **S Noorlander** (Greece) **C Papadáki**	**6**	**6**
(Japan) H Inoue (France) S Pitkowski	2	3
3	(Czech Republic) R Bobková (Germany) C Schneider	3	4
(Sweden) **Å Carlsson** (Argentina) **F Labat**	**6**	**6**
Q	(Germany) **J Kandarr** (Italy) **F Lubiani**	**6**	**6**
(Czech Republic) L Němečková (Spain) C Torrens Valero	4	4
(Italy) A Lombardi (Spain) G Riera Roura	4	2
(Russia) **E Kulikovskaya** (Ukraine) **O Lugina**	**6**	**6**
WC	(Turkey) H Gorur (Turkey) C Konuk	1	2
4	(Belarus) **O Barabanschikova** (Slovenia) **T Križan**	**6**	**6**
(Romania) R Sandu (Germany) J Wöhr	3	1
(Italy) **A Canepa** (Italy) **T Garbin**	**6**	**6**
(United States) R Jensen (Australia) D Jones	1	3
2	(Germany) **M Babel** (Belgium) **L Courtois**	**6**	**6**

Quarterfinals
1	(Belgium) S Appelmans (Belgium) E Callens	3	4
(Netherlands) **S Noorlander** (Greece) **C Papadáki**	**6**	**6**
(Sweden) **Å Carlsson** (Argentina) **F Labat**	**6**	**6**
Q	(Germany) J Kandarr (Italy) F Lubiani	1	1
(Russia) **E Kulikovskaya** (Ukraine) **O Lugina**	**6**	**7**
4	(Belarus) O Barabanschikova (Slovenia) T Križan	0	5
(Italy) A Canepa (Italy) T Garbin	2	0
2	(Germany) **M Babel** (Belgium) **L Courtois**	**6**	**6**

Semifinals
(Netherlands) S Noorlander (Greece) C Papadáki	3	**6**	6
(Sweden) **Å Carlsson** (Argentina) **F Labat**	**6**	4	**7**
(Russia) E Kulikovskaya (Ukraine) O Lugina	3	3
2	(Germany) **M Babel** (Belgium) **L Courtois**	**6**	**6**

Final
(Sweden) Åsa Carlsson (Argentina) Florencia Labat	0	2
2	(Germany) **Meike Babel** (Belgium) **Laurence Courtois**	**6**	**6**
