= Lanlana Tararudee =

Thai tennis player (born 2004)

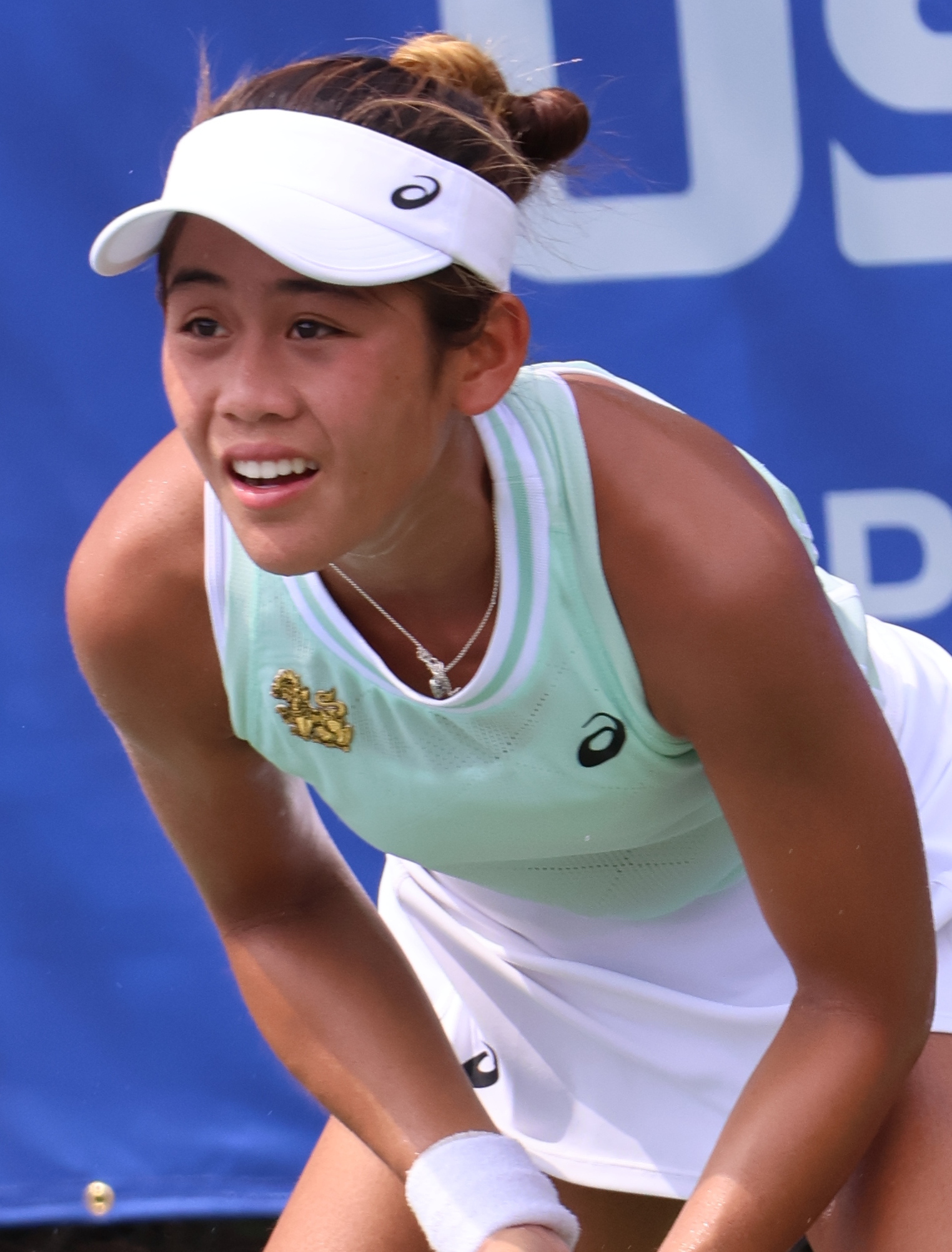
- Tararudee in Cary in 2024
- Native name: ลัลนา ธาราฤดี
- Country (sports): Thailand
- Born: 7 July 2004 (age 22) Thung Song, Thailand
- Height: 1.71 m (5 ft 7 in)
- Plays: Right (two-handed backhand)
- Prize money: $1,136,666

Singles
- Career record: 198–109
- Career titles: 2 WTA 125
- Highest ranking: No. 53 (19 October 2026)
- Current ranking: No. 57 (26 October 2026)

Grand Slam singles results
- Australian Open: 1R (2026)
- French Open: Q1 (2024, 2025, 2026)
- Wimbledon: 2R (2026)
- US Open: 2R (2026)

Doubles
- Career record: 37–44
- Career titles: 0
- Highest ranking: No. 371 (27 May 2024)
- Current ranking: No. 479 (26 October 2026)

Grand Slam doubles results
- Wimbledon: 1R (2026)
- US Open: 2R (2026)

Team competitions
- Fed Cup: 5–2
Medal record
Women's tennis
Representing Thailand
Southeast Asian Games
| Silver medal – second place | 2021 Vietnam | Doubles |
| Silver medal – second place | 2023 Cambodia | Singles |
| Silver medal – second place | 2023 Cambodia | Team |
| Silver medal – second place | 2025 Thailand | Team |
| Bronze medal – third place | 2023 Cambodia | Doubles |
- Last updated on: 26 October 2026.

Lanlana Tararudee (Thai: ลัลนา ธาราฤดี; born 7 July 2004) is a Thai tennis player. She has a career-high singles ranking by the WTA of 53, achieved on 19 October 2026, and a best doubles ranking of No. 371, reached on 27 May 2024. She is the current No. 1 Thai player.

Tararudee has won two WTA 125 singles titles.

== Career ==
=== 2023: WTA Tour, top 200 debuts ===
Playing for Thailand, Tararudee has accumulated a win–loss record of 3–0. Tararudee won the first ITF title in her career at the $40k tournament in Nonthaburi, Thailand defeating compatriot Mananchaya Sawangkaew in the final in three sets.

Tararudee made her WTA Tour main-draw debut at the 2023 Thailand Open, where she received a wildcard into the singles tournament, losing to Mirjam Bjorklund in the first round. She reached the top 200 in the singles rankings on 20 May 2024 and the top 175 on 29 July 2024.

Tararudee also received wildcards for both editions of the home tournament in Hua Hin, the 2024 Thailand Open and the 2024 Thailand Open 2 held in January and September 2024 respectively. At the latter, she recorded her first WTA tour-level win as a wildcard over compatriot and fellow wildcard Thasaporn Naklo.

=== 2025: WTA 125 final ===
In April, Lanlana represented Thailand at the Billie Jean King Cup for the first time since 2022. She participated in 4 matches, with 2 wins and 2 loses record.

In July, Tararudee reached her very first WTA 125 final at 2025 Porto Open, eventually losing to the third seed Tereza Valentová, in straight sets.

=== 2026: Grand Slam breakthroughs, top 100 and WTA 125 titles ===
Tararudee began the 2026 season at world No. 131 and became the Thai No. 1 in singles in January.

At the Australian Open, she was seeded 21st and won three consecutive matches to reach a majors main draw for the first time. She lost in the first round to 21st seed Elise Mertens.

In March, Tararudee won her first WTA 125 title at the Austin Challenger, defeating former US Open champion Bianca Andreescu in three sets, in the final. She entered the top 100 for the first time on 4 May, at world No. 99.

At the Wimbledon Championships, Tararudee recorded her first majors main-draw victory by defeating Lilli Tagger in three sets. Her victory, alongside compatriot Mananchaya Sawangkaew's first-round win, marked the first time in the Open Era that two Thai players won Grand Slam tournament main-draw matches at the same tournament. She was eliminated in the second round by 18th seed Ekaterina Alexandrova.

The following month, Tararudee claimed her second WTA 125 title at the ENKA Ladies Open in Istanbul by defeating Hanne Vandewinkel, in three sets in the final.

At the US Open, she overcame qualifier Elvina Kalieva in three sets in the first round, recording the second majors main-draw victory of her career.

== Performance timeline ==
Key
| W | F | SF | QF | #R | RR | Q# | DNQ | A | NH |

(W) winner; (F) finalist; (SF) semifinalist; (QF) quarterfinalist; (#R) rounds 4, 3, 2, 1; (RR) round-robin stage; (Q#) qualification round; (DNQ) did not qualify; (A) absent; (NH) not held; (SR) strike rate (events won / competed); (W–L) win–loss record.
To avoid confusion and double counting, these charts are updated at the conclusion of a tournament or when the player's participation has ended.

=== Singles ===
| Tournament | 2024 | 2025 | 2026 | W–L |
|---|---|---|---|---|
Grand Slam tournaments
| Australian Open | Q1 | Q1 | 1R | 0–1 |
| French Open | Q1 | Q1 | Q1 | 0–0 |
| Wimbledon | Q2 | Q3 | 2R | 1–1 |
| US Open | Q1 | Q1 | 2R | 1–1 |
| Win–Loss | 0–0 | 0–1 | 2–3 | 2–3 |
WTA 1000 tournaments
| Indian Wells Open | A | A | 1R | 0–1 |
| Canadian Open | A | A | 2R (Note: Withdrew during the tournament. Not counted as a loss.) | 1–0 |
| Cincinnati Open | A | A | Q2 | 0–0 |
| China Open | A | Q2 | 1R | 0–1 |
| Wuhan Open | A | A | 2R | 1–1 |
| Win–Loss | 0–0 | 0–0 | 2–3 | 2–3 |

== WTA 125 finals ==
=== Singles: 3 (2 titles, 1 runner-up) ===
| Result | W–L | Date | Tournament | Surface | Opponent | Score |
|---|---|---|---|---|---|---|
| Loss | 0–1 | Jul 2025 | Porto Open, Portugal | Hard | (Czech Republic) Tereza Valentová | 4–6, 2–6 |
| Win | 1–1 | Mar 2026 | Austin Challenger, United States | Hard | (Canada) Bianca Andreescu | 6–3, 3–6, 6–3 |
| Win | 2–1 | Jul 2026 | ENKA Ladies Open, Turkey | Hard | (Belgium) Hanne Vandewinkel | 6–4, 4–6, 6–3 |

== ITF Circuit finals ==
=== Singles: 9 (6 titles, 3 runner-ups) ===
| Legend W100 tournaments (0–1) W75 tournaments (0–1) W40/50 tournaments (3–1) W35 tournaments (1–0) W15 tournaments (2–0) | Finals by surface Hard (5–3) Clay (1–0) |

| Result | W–L | Date | Location | Tier | Surface | Opponents | Score |
|---|---|---|---|---|---|---|---|
| Win | 1–0 | Jan 2023 | ITF Nonthaburi, Thailand | W40 | Hard | (Thailand) Mananchaya Sawangkaew | 2–6, 6–1, 6–0 |
| Win | 2–0 | Feb 2023 | ITF Ipoh, Malaysia | W15 | Hard | (United States) Jaeda Daniel | 6–0, 3–6, 6–2 |
| Win | 3–0 | Jul 2023 | ITF Nakhon Si Thammarat, Thailand | W15 | Hard | (South Korea) Back Da-yeon | 6–4, 6–4 |
| Win | 4–0 | Aug 2023 | ITF Nanchang, China | W40 | Clay (i) | (China) You Xiaodi | 6–2, 6–3 |
| Win | 5–0 | Mar 2024 | Traralgon International, Australia | W35 | Hard | (China) Ma Yexin | 6–4, 7–5 |
| Win | 6–0 | Apr 2024 | ITF Shenzhen, China | W50 | Hard | (China) Ren Yufei | 6–7^{(5)}, 6–3, 6–2 |
| Loss | 6–1 | Apr 2024 | ITF Wuning, China | W50 | Hard | (China) Wang Qiang | 6–1, 3–6, 3–4 ret. |
| Loss | 6–2 | Mar 2025 | Jin'an Open, China | W75 | Hard | (Australia) Arina Rodionova | 3–6, 6–1, 3–6 |
| Loss | 6–3 | Apr 2026 | Tokyo Open, Japan | W100 | Hard | (Australia) Taylah Preston | 1–6, 6–4, 4–6 |

=== Doubles: 4 (4 runner-ups) ===
| Legend W100 tournaments (0–1) W40/50 tournaments (0–2) W35 tournaments (0–1) | Finals by surface Hard (0–3) Clay (0–1) |

| Result | W–L | Date | Tournament | Tier | Surface | Partner | Opponents | Score |
|---|---|---|---|---|---|---|---|---|
| Loss | 0–1 | Aug 2023 | Kunming Open, China | W40 | Clay | (Kazakhstan) Zhibek Kulambayeva | (China) Guo Hanyu (China) Jiang Xinyu | 2–6, 0–6 |
| Loss | 0–2 | Jan 2024 | ITF Nonthaburi, Thailand | W50 | Hard | (Chinese Taipei) Tsao Chia-yi | (Kazakhstan) Zhibek Kulambayeva (Greece) Sapfo Sakellaridi | w/o |
| Loss | 0–3 | Feb 2024 | Traralgon International, Australia | W35 | Hard | (Japan) Sayaka Ishii | (Japan) Mana Kawamura (China) Liu Fangzhou | 7–6^{(4)}, 3–6, [11–13] |
| Loss | 0–4 | Apr 2025 | Tokyo Open, Japan | W100 | Hard | (Thailand) Mananchaya Sawangkaew | (China) Guo Hanyu (Japan) Ena Shibahara | 7–5, 6–7^{(1)}, [5–10] |

== Fed Cup participation ==
=== Singles (2–2) ===
| Edition | Stage | Date | Location | Against | Surface | Opponents | W/L | Score |
|---|---|---|---|---|---|---|---|---|
| 2025 | Asia/Oceania Zone, Group 1, Round Robin | 8 April 2025 | MSLTA School of Tennis, Pune, India | Hong Kong | Hard | Wu Ho-ching | W | 6–1, 6–4 |
| 2025 | Asia/Oceania Zone, Group 1, Round Robin | 9 April 2025 | MSLTA School of Tennis, Pune, India | India | Hard | Shrivalli Bhamidipaty | L | 2–6, 4–6 |
| 2025 | Asia/Oceania Zone, Group 1, Round Robin | 10 April 2025 | MSLTA School of Tennis, Pune, India | South Korea | Hard | Park So-hyun | L | 4–6, 6–1, 5-7 |
| 2025 | Asia/Oceania Zone, Group 1, Round Robin | 12 April 2025 | MSLTA School of Tennis, Pune, India | Chinese Taipei | Hard | Lin Fang-an | W | 6–3, 6–3 |

=== Doubles (3–0) ===
| Edition | Stage | Date | Location | Against | Surface | Partner | Opponents | W/L | Score |
|---|---|---|---|---|---|---|---|---|---|
| 2022 | Z2 R/R | 8 August 2022 | Kuala Lumpur, Malaysia | Pacific Oceania | Hard | Punnin Kovapitukted | Kalani Soli; Abigail Tere-Apisah | W | 4–6, 5–2 ret. |
| 2022 | Z2 R/R | 10 August 2022 | Kuala Lumpur, Malaysia | Singapore | Hard | Chompoothip Jundakate | Sue Yan Tan; Audrey Tong | W | 6–0, 6–1 |
| 2022 | Z2 R/R | 12 August 2022 | Kuala Lumpur, Malaysia | Maldives | Hard | Chompoothip Jundakate | Sarah Akram; Aaraa Aasaal Azim | W | 6–0, 6–0 |
