= 2026 Wimbledon Championships – Women's singles qualifying =

Tennis championship

Ladies' singles qualifying
- 2026 Wimbledon Championships

Details
- Draw: 128
- Seeds: 32

Events
Singles	men	women		boys	girls
Doubles	men	women	mixed	boys	girls
WC Singles	men	women	quad
WC Doubles	men	women	quad
14&U Singles	boys	girls
Legends	men	women	mixed

Qualification
Singles	men	women
- Wimbledon Championships

The 2026 Wimbledon Championships – Women's singles qualifying was a series of tennis matches that took place from 23 to 25 June 2026 to determine the sixteen qualifiers into the main draw of the women's singles tournament.

16 out of the 128 qualifiers who compete in this knock-out tournament secured a main draw place.

== Seeds ==
All seeds are per WTA rankings as of 15 June 2026.

1. (Uzbekistan) Maria Timofeeva (qualified)
2. (United States) Ashlyn Krueger (qualified)
3. Alina Korneeva (qualified)
4. (China) Wang Xiyu (second round, retired)
5. (United States) Katie Volynets (qualifying competition)
6. (Latvia) Darja Semeņistaja (qualifying competition, lucky loser)
7. (Spain) Kaitlin Quevedo (second round)
8. (Japan) Moyuka Uchijima (first round)
9. (New Zealand) Lulu Sun (second round)
10. (Hungary) Dalma Gálfi (first round)
11. (Uzbekistan) Polina Kudermetova (qualified)
12. (Austria) Julia Grabher (first round)
13. (Czech Republic) Dominika Šalková (first round)
14. (Poland) Katarzyna Kawa (qualifying competition)
15. Aliaksandra Sasnovich (qualifying competition)
16. (Slovakia) Rebecca Šramková (second round)
17. (China) Yuan Yue (first round)
18. (Australia) Taylah Preston (first round)
19. (Japan) Himeno Sakatsume (first round)
20. (Italy) Lucia Bronzetti (qualifying competition)
21. (Egypt) Mayar Sherif (first round)
22. Alina Charaeva (qualifying competition)
23. (France) Léolia Jeanjean (qualified)
24. (Switzerland) Jil Teichmann (second round)
25. (United States) Mary Stoiana (second round)
26. (Slovenia) Tamara Zidanšek (first round)
27. (Netherlands) Suzan Lamens (second round)
28. (Italy) Lisa Pigato (first round)
29. (Australia) Emerson Jones (second round)
30. (China) Zhu Lin (qualifying competition)
31. (United States) Elvina Kalieva (second round)
32. (United States) Kayla Day (qualified)

== Qualifiers ==
1. (Uzbekistan) Maria Timofeeva
2. (United States) Ashlyn Krueger
3. Alina Korneeva
4. (United States) Robin Montgomery
5. (France) Léolia Jeanjean
6. Anastasia Gasanova
7. (United States) Claire Liu
8. (Italy) Tyra Caterina Grant
9. (Thailand) Mananchaya Sawangkaew
10. (North Macedonia) Lina Gjorcheska
11. (Uzbekistan) Polina Kudermetova
12. (Georgia (country)) Mariam Bolkvadze
13. Iryna Shymanovich
14. (United States) Kayla Day
15. (Canada) Bianca Andreescu
16. (Serbia) Teodora Kostović

== Lucky loser ==
1. (Latvia) Darja Semeņistaja

== Draw ==
Key

- Q = Qualifier
- WC = Wild card
- LL = Lucky loser
- Alt = Alternate
- ITF = ITF entry
- PR = Protected ranking
- SR = Special ranking
- SE = Special exempt
- JE = Junior exempt
- JR = Junior Accelerator Programme entrant
- CO = College Accelerator Programme entrant
- NG = Next Gen Accelerator Program entrant
- w/o = Walkover
- r = Retired
- d = Defaulted

=== First qualifier ===
First round
1	(Uzbekistan) Maria Timofeeva	6	6
(United States) Whitney Osuigwe	1	4
(Netherlands) Arantxa Rus	4	4
(Ukraine) Veronika Podrez	6	6
(France) Carole Monnet	2	4
Tatiana Prozorova	6	6
WC	(United Kingdom) Heather Watson	6	6
21	(Egypt) Mayar Sherif	2	2

Second round
1	(Uzbekistan) Maria Timofeeva	6	6
(Ukraine) Veronika Podrez	4	2
Tatiana Prozorova	7	3	5
WC	(United Kingdom) Heather Watson	5	6	7

Qualifying competition
1	(Uzbekistan) Maria Timofeeva	3	6	6
WC	(United Kingdom) Heather Watson	6	2	1

=== Second qualifier ===
First round
2	(United States) Ashlyn Krueger	7	7
(Czech Republic) Gabriela Knutson	5	5
(Japan) Mai Hontama	7^{8}	6
(United States) Akasha Urhobo	6^{6}	3
Polina Iatcenko	6	6
(Spain) Leyre Romero Gormaz	0	3
PR	(China) Bai Zhuoxuan	6	7
26	(Slovenia) Tamara Zidanšek	2	5

Second round
2	(United States) Ashlyn Krueger	6	5	6
(Japan) Mai Hontama	3	7	3
Polina Iatcenko	7^{9}	6
PR	(China) Bai Zhuoxuan	6^{7}	2

Qualifying competition
2	(United States) Ashlyn Krueger	7^{10}	6
Polina Iatcenko	6^{8}	1

=== Third qualifier ===
First round
3	Alina Korneeva	2	7^{7}	6
Alexandra Shubladze	6	6^{2}	3
(Italy) Nuria Brancaccio	3	4
(Spain) Andrea Lázaro García	6	6
(Argentina) Julia Riera	2	6	6
WC	(United Kingdom) Daniella Britton	6	2	4
(United States) Fiona Crawley	7	4	7^{10}
19	(Japan) Himeno Sakatsume	5	6	6^{8}

Second round
3	Alina Korneeva	6	6^{5}	7
(Spain) Andrea Lázaro García	2	7^{7}	5
(Argentina) Julia Riera	2	6	6^{1}
(United States) Fiona Crawley	6	3	7^{10}

Qualifying competition
3	Alina Korneeva	6	6
(United States) Fiona Crawley	2	0

=== Fourth qualifier ===
First round
4	(China) Wang Xiyu	7^{7}	6
(China) Guo Hanyu	6^{4}	3
(Serbia) Lola Radivojević	7^{12}	2	6^{7}
(Spain) Marina Bassols Ribera	6^{10}	6	7^{10}
(United States) Caroline Dolehide	4	6^{1}
PR	(United States) Robin Montgomery	6	7^{7}
WC	(United Kingdom) Ella McDonald	6	6^{4}	4
31	(United States) Elvina Kalieva	3	7^{7}	6

Second round
4	(China) Wang Xiyu	6	1	0^{r}
(Spain) Marina Bassols Ribera	3	6	4
PR	(United States) Robin Montgomery	6	6
31	(United States) Elvina Kalieva	2	2

Qualifying competition
(Spain) Marina Bassols Ribera	6	1	1
PR	(United States) Robin Montgomery	3	6	6

=== Fifth qualifier ===
First round
5	(United States) Katie Volynets	7^{7}	6
(Czech Republic) Laura Samson	6^{5}	1
WC	(United Kingdom) Lily Miyazaki	2	4
(Bulgaria) Elizara Yaneva	6	6
(Georgia (country)) Ekaterine Gorgodze	6	7^{7}
(Czech Republic) Vendula Valdmannová	2	6^{2}
(China) You Xiaodi	6	2	3
23	(France) Léolia Jeanjean	4	6	6

Second round
5	(United States) Katie Volynets	6	6
(Bulgaria) Elizara Yaneva	1	4
(Georgia (country)) Ekaterine Gorgodze	3	2
23	(France) Léolia Jeanjean	6	6

Qualifying competition
5	(United States) Katie Volynets	3	4
23	(France) Léolia Jeanjean	6	6

=== Sixth qualifier ===
First round
6	(Latvia) Darja Semeņistaja	7^{7}	1	7
(Czech Republic) Anna Sisková	6^{2}	6	5
(Australia) Priscilla Hon	2	2
(Japan) Nao Hibino	6	6
(United States) Varvara Lepchenko	6	1	6^{10}
Anastasia Gasanova	2	6	7^{12}
(Czech Republic) Linda Fruhvirtová	2	1
29	(Australia) Emerson Jones	6	6

Second round
6	(Latvia) Darja Semeņistaja	6	1	6
(Japan) Nao Hibino	4	6	2
Anastasia Gasanova	5	6	6
29	(Australia) Emerson Jones	7	4	3

Qualifying competition
6	(Latvia) Darja Semeņistaja	4	2
Anastasia Gasanova	6	6

=== Seventh qualifier ===
First round
7	(Spain) Kaitlin Quevedo	6	6
PR	(Japan) Sayaka Ishii	0	3
(Greece) Despina Papamichail	2	1
(United States) Claire Liu	6	6
PR	(France) Alice Tubello	2	0
Elena Pridankina	6	6
WC	(United Kingdom) Amelia Rajecki	3	5
27	(Netherlands) Suzan Lamens	6	7

Second round
7	(Spain) Kaitlin Quevedo	4	4
(United States) Claire Liu	6	6
Elena Pridankina	7	4	6
27	(Netherlands) Suzan Lamens	5	6	3

Qualifying competition
(United States) Claire Liu	6	4	6
Elena Pridankina	2	6	1

=== Eighth qualifier ===
First round
8	(Japan) Moyuka Uchijima	1	6	5
WC	(United Kingdom) Esther Adeshina	6	3	7
(France) Harmony Tan	7^{7}	2	6
WC	(Slovakia) Mia Pohánková	6^{3}	6	1
(Switzerland) Céline Naef	6	5	4
(Chinese Taipei) Joanna Garland	3	7	6
(Italy) Tyra Caterina Grant	6	2	6
18	(Australia) Taylah Preston	1	6	4

Second round
WC	(United Kingdom) Esther Adeshina	2	2
(France) Harmony Tan	6	6
(Chinese Taipei) Joanna Garland	4	4
(Italy) Tyra Caterina Grant	6	6

Qualifying competition
(France) Harmony Tan	4	6^{5}
(Italy) Tyra Caterina Grant	6	7^{7}

=== Ninth qualifier ===
First round
9	(New Zealand) Lulu Sun	7^{7}	7
(Poland) Linda Klimovičová	6^{3}	5
(Brazil) Laura Pigossi	5	4
PR	(France) Océane Dodin	7	6
(Netherlands) Anouk Koevermans	3	6	4
(Thailand) Mananchaya Sawangkaew	6	1	6
(Canada) Kayla Cross	3	4
25	(United States) Mary Stoiana	6	6

Second round
9	(New Zealand) Lulu Sun	6^{10}	6^{5}
PR	(France) Océane Dodin	7^{12}	7^{7}
(Thailand) Mananchaya Sawangkaew	2	6	7
25	(United States) Mary Stoiana	6	4	5

Qualifying competition
PR	(France) Océane Dodin	7	5	1
(Thailand) Mananchaya Sawangkaew	5	7	6

=== Tenth qualifier ===
First round
10	(Hungary) Dalma Gálfi	6^{5}	3
(Portugal) Francisca Jorge	7^{7}	6
(Spain) Ángela Fita Boluda	2	4
(North Macedonia) Lina Gjorcheska	6	6
(Lithuania) Justina Mikulskytė	6	7^{8}
PR	(Canada) Carol Zhao	3	6^{6}
(Australia) Maddison Inglis	3	6	4
20	(Italy) Lucia Bronzetti	6	3	6

Second round
(Portugal) Francisca Jorge	7	2	1
(North Macedonia) Lina Gjorcheska	5	6	6
(Lithuania) Justina Mikulskytė	3	3
20	(Italy) Lucia Bronzetti	6	6

Qualifying competition
(North Macedonia) Lina Gjorcheska	6	6
20	(Italy) Lucia Bronzetti	1	2

=== Eleventh qualifier ===
First round
11	(Uzbekistan) Polina Kudermetova	1	6	6
(France) Jessika Ponchet	6	2	3
(Germany) Anna-Lena Friedsam	3	5
PR	(United States) Clervie Ngounoue	6	7
(France) Alice Ramé	3	7	2
(Germany) Caroline Werner	6	5	6
(United States) Elizabeth Mandlik	2	4
22	Alina Charaeva	6	6

Second round
11	(Uzbekistan) Polina Kudermetova	6	6
PR	(United States) Clervie Ngounoue	1	2
(Germany) Caroline Werner	7	4	0
22	Alina Charaeva	5	6	6

Qualifying competition
11	(Uzbekistan) Polina Kudermetova	4	6	6
22	Alina Charaeva	6	4	1

=== Twelfth qualifier ===
First round
12	(Austria) Julia Grabher	4	6^{6}
PR	(Georgia (country)) Mariam Bolkvadze	6	7^{8}
(Japan) Hayu Kinoshita	7	6
(Bulgaria) Viktoriya Tomova	5	3
(Argentina) María Lourdes Carlé	7	5	6
(Czech Republic) Lucie Havlíčková	5	7	4
(Belgium) Jeline Vandromme	4	6	6
17	(China) Yuan Yue	6	0	2

Second round
PR	(Georgia (country)) Mariam Bolkvadze	6	6
(Japan) Hayu Kinoshita	3	2
(Argentina) María Lourdes Carlé	7^{7}	4	3
(Belgium) Jeline Vandromme	6^{1}	6	6

Qualifying competition
PR	(Georgia (country)) Mariam Bolkvadze	6	4	6
(Belgium) Jeline Vandromme	4	6	3

=== Thirteenth qualifier ===
First round
13	(Czech Republic) Dominika Šalková	6^{5}	6	4
Iryna Shymanovich	7^{7}	3	6
(Belgium) Greet Minnen	6	6
(France) Fiona Ferro	3	1
Alt	(Canada) Katherine Sebov	4	6	6
(Argentina) Jazmín Ortenzi	6	3	2
(Germany) Noma Noha Akugue	7^{7}	6
28	(Italy) Lisa Pigato	6^{2}	3

Second round
Iryna Shymanovich	6	6
(Belgium) Greet Minnen	4	2
Alt	(Canada) Katherine Sebov	6	5	7
(Germany) Noma Noha Akugue	4	7	5

Qualifying competition
Iryna Shymanovich	4	6	7^{10}
Alt	(Canada) Katherine Sebov	6	3	6^{5}

=== Fourteenth qualifier ===
First round
14	(Poland) Katarzyna Kawa	6	6
(Switzerland) Susan Bandecchi	1	3
(Argentina) Luisina Giovannini	6^{6}	6^{5}
(Italy) Lucrezia Stefanini	7^{8}	7^{7}
(China) Ma Yexin	0	3
Erika Andreeva	6	6
(Canada) Cadence Brace	4	3
32	(United States) Kayla Day	6	6

Second round
14	(Poland) Katarzyna Kawa	6	2	6
(Italy) Lucrezia Stefanini	4	6	2
Erika Andreeva	2	2
32	(United States) Kayla Day	6	6

Qualifying competition
14	(Poland) Katarzyna Kawa	2	5
32	(United States) Kayla Day	6	7

=== Fifteenth qualifier ===
First round
15	Aliaksandra Sasnovich	1	6	6
WC	(United Kingdom) Katy Dunne	6	3	2
(Australia) Storm Hunter	7	6
(Belgium) Sofia Costoulas	5	4
(Canada) Bianca Andreescu	6	6
(Slovenia) Polona Hercog	4	2
(Switzerland) Rebeka Masarova	6^{2}	4
24	(Switzerland) Jil Teichmann	7^{7}	6

Second round
15	Aliaksandra Sasnovich	5	6	7
(Australia) Storm Hunter	7	1	5
(Canada) Bianca Andreescu	6^{4}	6	6
24	(Switzerland) Jil Teichmann	7^{7}	1	4

Qualifying competition
15	Aliaksandra Sasnovich	3	6^{4}
(Canada) Bianca Andreescu	6	7^{7}

=== Sixteenth qualifier ===
First round
16	(Slovakia) Rebecca Šramková	7^{7}	7^{7}
(Slovakia) Viktória Hrunčáková	6^{5}	6^{3}
(South Korea) Ku Yeon-woo	1	4
(Serbia) Teodora Kostović	6	6
(France) Tiantsoa Rakotomanga Rajaonah	6	4	6
(United States) Carol Young Suh Lee	4	6	3
(Germany) Mona Barthel	4	3
30	(China) Zhu Lin	6	6

Second round
16	(Slovakia) Rebecca Šramková	6	6^{4}	4
(Serbia) Teodora Kostović	4	7^{7}	6
(France) Tiantsoa Rakotomanga Rajaonah	2	3
30	(China) Zhu Lin	6	6

Qualifying competition
(Serbia) Teodora Kostović	6	6
30	(China) Zhu Lin	3	4
