= 2024 Abierto Tampico – Singles =

Singles
- 2024 Abierto Tampico

Final
- Champion: (Canada) Marina Stakusic
- Runner-up: Anna Blinkova
- Score: 6–4, 2–6, 6–4

Details
- Draw: 32 (4 WC)
- Seeds: 8

Events
Singles	Doubles
← 2023 ·	Abierto Tampico	· 2025 →

Marina Stakusic won the singles title at the 2024 Abierto Tampico, as a qualifier, defeating Anna Blinkova in the final, 6–4, 2–6, 6–4.

Emina Bektas was the reigning champion, but chose to compete in Guangzhou instead.

== Seeds ==
1. (Spain) Nuria Párrizas Díaz (second round)
2. (Germany) Jule Niemeier (first round)
3. (Argentina) María Lourdes Carlé (second round)
4. (Germany) Tatjana Maria (quarterfinals)
5. Anna Blinkova (final)
6. (Spain) Sara Sorribes Tormo (semifinals)
7. (United States) Robin Montgomery (second round)
8. (Australia) Maya Joint (quarterfinals)

== Draw ==
=== Key ===
- Q = Qualifier
- WC = Wild card
- LL = Lucky loser
- Alt = Alternate
- SE = Special exempt
- PR = Protected ranking
- ITF = ITF entry
- JE = Junior exempt
- w/o = Walkover
- r = Retired
- d = Defaulted
- SR = Special ranking

=== Finals ===
Semifinals
Q	(Canada) Marina Stakusic	7^{7}	7^{7}
6	(Spain) Sara Sorribes Tormo	6^{3}	6^{0}
(Canada) Rebecca Marino	6^{8}	7^{7}	2
5	Anna Blinkova	7^{10}	6^{4}	6

Final
Q	(Canada) Marina Stakusic	6	2	6
5	Anna Blinkova	4	6	4

=== Top half ===
First round
1	(Spain) N Párrizas Díaz	7	6
Q	(India) S Yamalapalli	5	4
(United States) A Li	4	4
(Italy) L Stefanini	6	6
Q	(Canada) M Stakusic	6	6
Q	(Ukraine) A Sobolieva	2	2
(United States) E Mandlik	4	2
7	(United States) R Montgomery	6	6
4	(Germany) T Maria	6	6
PR	(Serbia) N Stojanović	3	1
(Colombia) E Arango	1	5
(Slovenia) T Zidanšek	6	7
P Kudermetova	6	6
(Australia) A Sharma	1	4
WC	(Mexico) AS Sánchez	0	1
6	(Spain) S Sorribes Tormo	6	6

Second round
1	(Spain) N Párrizas Díaz	6	6^{4}	4
(Italy) L Stefanini	2	7^{7}	6
Q	(Canada) M Stakusic	6	7^{7}
7	(United States) R Montgomery	4	6^{5}
4	(Germany) T Maria	7	6
(Slovenia) T Zidanšek	5	2
P Kudermetova	3	4
6	(Spain) S Sorribes Tormo	6	6

Quarterfinals
(Italy) L Stefanini	6	4	5
Q	(Canada) M Stakusic	0	6	7
4	(Germany) T Maria	6^{6}	2
6	(Spain) S Sorribes Tormo	7^{8}	6

Semifinals
Q	(Canada) M Stakusic	7^{7}	7^{7}
6	(Spain) S Sorribes Tormo	6^{3}	6^{0}

=== Bottom half ===
First round
8	(Australia) M Joint	6	6
WC	(France) E Jacquemot	3	4
(Poland) M Chwalińska	3	1
(United States) H Chang	6	6
(Canada) R Marino	6	6
WC	(Mexico) J Hinojosa Gomez	1	0
PR	A Korneeva	7^{10}	4	4
3	(Argentina) ML Carlé	6^{8}	6	6
5	A Blinkova	6	6
(Slovenia) V Erjavec	3	0
(Croatia) A Ružić	7^{7}	2	3
A Tikhonova	6^{5}	6	6
WC	(Mexico) V Rodríguez	4	2
(Switzerland) J Teichmann	6	6
Q	(United States) V Lepchenko	6	6
2	(Germany) J Niemeier	3	3

Second round
8	(Australia) M Joint	6	6
(United States) H Chang	1	2
(Canada) R Marino	7^{7}	6
3	(Argentina) ML Carlé	6^{5}	4
5	A Blinkova	6	6^{4}	6
A Tikhonova	0	7^{7}	1
(Switzerland) J Teichmann	6^{3}	6	3
Q	(United States) V Lepchenko	7^{7}	2	6

Quarterfinals
8	(Australia) M Joint	2	3
(Canada) R Marino	6	6
5	A Blinkova	6	6
Q	(United States) V Lepchenko	2	4

Semifinals
(Canada) R Marino	6^{8}	7^{7}	2
5	A Blinkova	7^{10}	6^{4}	6

== Qualifying ==
=== Seeds ===
1. (Canada) Marina Stakusic (qualified)
2. (United States) Varvara Lepchenko (qualified)
3. (Romania) Miriam Bulgaru (qualifying competition)
4. (Ukraine) Anastasiia Sobolieva (qualified)
5. Iryna Shymanovich (qualifying competition)
6. (India) Sahaja Yamalapalli (qualified)
7. (Netherlands) Eva Vedder (qualifying competition)
8. Maria Kozyreva (qualifying competition)

=== Qualifiers ===
1. (Canada) Marina Stakusic
2. (United States) Varvara Lepchenko
3. (India) Sahaja Yamalapalli
4. (Ukraine) Anastasiia Sobolieva

=== Qualifying draw ===
==== First qualifier ====
First round
1	(Canada) Marina Stakusic	6	6
(Argentina) Melany Krywoj	1	1
WC	(Mexico) Daniela Martínez Guerrero	0	2
5	Iryna Shymanovich	6	6

Qualifying competition
1	(Canada) Marina Stakusic	6^{4}	6	6
5	Iryna Shymanovich	7^{7}	2	4

==== Second qualifier ====
First round
2	(United States) Varvara Lepchenko	6	6
(Spain) Alicia Herrero Liñana	4	4
(Serbia) Katarina Jokić	1	2
7	(Netherlands) Eva Vedder	6	6

Qualifying competition
2	(United States) Varvara Lepchenko	6	6
7	(Netherlands) Eva Vedder	4	3

==== Third qualifier ====
First round
3	(Romania) Miriam Bulgaru	6	7^{7}
(Georgia (country)) Oksana Kalashnikova	1	6^{4}
WC	(Mexico) Ana Paola González Domínguez	0	0
6	(India) Sahaja Yamalapalli	6	6

Qualifying competition
3	(Romania) Miriam Bulgaru	4	2
6	(India) Sahaja Yamalapalli	6	6

==== Fourth qualifier ====
First round
4	(Ukraine) Anastasiia Sobolieva	6	7
(Ukraine) Kateryna Volodko	4	5
Maria Kononova	3	7^{9}	0
8	Maria Kozyreva	6	6^{7}	6

Qualifying competition
4	(Ukraine) Anastasiia Sobolieva	7	7^{8}
8	Maria Kozyreva	5	6^{6}
