= 2024 Abierto Tampico – Doubles =

Doubles
- 2024 Abierto Tampico

Final
- Champions: (United States) Carmen Corley (Canada) Rebecca Marino
- Runners-up: Alina Korneeva; Polina Kudermetova
- Score: 6–3, 6–3

Details
- Draw: 16
- Seeds: 4

Events
Singles	Doubles
← 2023 ·	Abierto Tampico	· 2025 →

Carmen Corley and Rebecca Marino won the title, defeating Alina Korneeva and Polina Kudermetova in the final, 6–3, 6–3.

Kamilla Rakhimova and Anastasia Tikhonova were the reigning champions, but Rakhimova chose to compete in Guangzhou instead. Tikhonova was scheduled to play with Anna Blinkova, but they withdrew from their first round match.

== Seeds ==
1. (Georgia (country)) Oksana Kalashnikova / Iryna Shymanovich (withdrew)
2. Anna Blinkova / Anastasia Tikhonova (withdrew)
3. (United States) Quinn Gleason / (Brazil) Ingrid Martins (quarterfinals)
4. (Argentina) María Lourdes Carlé / (Netherlands) Eva Vedder (quarterfinals)

== Draw ==
Key

- Q = Qualifier
- WC = Wild card
- LL = Lucky loser
- Alt = Alternate
- ITF = ITF entry
- PR = Protected ranking
- SR = Special ranking
- SE = Special exempt
- JE = Junior exempt
- JR = Junior Accelerator Programme entrant
- CO = College Accelerator Programme entrant
- NG = Next Gen Accelerator Program entrant
- w/o = Walkover
- r = Retired
- d = Defaulted

=== Draw ===
First round
1	(Georgia (country)) O Kalashnikova; I Shymanovich
(Mexico) V Rodríguez (Mexico) AS Sánchez	w/o
(Colombia) E Arango (Colombia) MP Pérez	7^{7}	3	[5]
(Poland) M Chwalińska (Croatia) A Ružić	6^{3}	6	[10]
4	(Argentina) ML Carlé (Netherlands) E Vedder	6	2	[10]
(Spain) A Herrero Liñana (Argentina) M Krywoj	4	6	[6]
WC	(Mexico) J Hinojosa Gómez (United States) L Middleton	1	0
A Korneeva; P Kudermetova	6	6
(Slovenia) V Erjavec (Slovenia) T Zidanšek	2	4
(Australia) M Joint (Australia) A Sharma	6	6
M Kononova; M Kozyreva	6	2	[6]
3	(United States) Q Gleason (Brazil) I Martins	3	6	[10]
(United States) C Corley (Canada) R Marino	4	7^{7}	[10]
(Serbia) N Stojanović (Switzerland) J Teichmann	6	6^{3}	[8]
(France) E Jacquemot (Spain) N Párrizas Díaz	w/o
2	A Blinkova; A Tikhonova

Quarterfinals
(Mexico) V Rodríguez (Mexico) AS Sánchez	0	7^{7}	[1]
(Poland) M Chwalińska (Croatia) A Ružić	6	6^{5}	[10]
4	(Argentina) ML Carlé (Netherlands) E Vedder	2	6^{6}
A Korneeva; P Kudermetova	6	7^{8}
(Australia) M Joint (Australia) A Sharma	7	6
3	(United States) Q Gleason (Brazil) I Martins	5	3
(United States) C Corley (Canada) R Marino	6	6^{4}	[10]
(France) E Jacquemot (Spain) N Párrizas Díaz	2	7^{7}	[6]

Semifinals
(Poland) M Chwalińska (Croatia) A Ružić
A Korneeva; P Kudermetova	w/o
(Australia) M Joint (Australia) A Sharma
(United States) C Corley (Canada) R Marino	w/o

Final
A Korneeva; P Kudermetova	3	3
(United States) C Corley (Canada) R Marino	6	6
