= ENKA Ladies Open =

ENKA Open
- 2026 ENKA Ladies Open

WTA 125
- Event name: ENKA Open
- Tour: WTA 125
- Founded: 1998
- Editions: 2
- Location: İstinye, Istanbul, Turkey
- Venue: Enka Spor Kulübü
- Surface: Hard
- Draw: 32S/16Q/16D
- Prize money: $115,000
- Website: Website

Current champions (2026)
- Singles: (Thailand) Lanlana Tararudee
- Doubles: (Japan) Ena Shibahara; Vera Zvonareva

The ENKA Open (Turkish: ENKA Açık) is a professional tennis tournament. It is a WTA 125 event held in Istanbul, Turkey and played on outdoor hardcourts in July, since 2026.

== History ==
The first edition as a Tier IV event, called ENKA Ladies Open, part of the WTA Tour, was held in 1998.

== Finals ==
=== Singles ===
Year	Champion	Runner-up	Score
2026	(Thailand) Lanlana Tararudee	(Belgium) Hanne Vandewinkel	6–4, 4–6, 6–3
⬆️ WTA 125 ⬆️
1999–2025	Not held		
1998	(Slovakia) Henrieta Nagyová	(Belarus) Olga Barabanschikova	6–4, 3–6, 7–6^{(11–9)}

=== Doubles ===
Year	Champions	Runners-up	Score
2026	(Japan) Ena Shibahara; Vera Zvonareva	Tatiana Prozorova; Alexandra Shubladze	6–3, 3–6, [10–8]
⬆️ WTA 125 ⬆️
1999–2025	Not held		
1998	(Germany) Meike Babel (Belgium) Laurence Courtois	(Sweden) Åsa Carlsson (Argentina) Florencia Labat	6–0, 6–2

== See also ==
- ENKA Open – ATP Challenger Tour event also held at the ENKA Sports Club in August
- İstanbul Open – WTA 125 event, also held in İstinye, Istanbul in May
- Istanbul Open – ATP Tour event (2015–2018)
- İstanbul Cup – WTA Tour tournament (2005–2022)
