= 2024 Abierto Tampico =

- Date: 21–26 October
- Edition: 8th
- Category: WTA 125
- Prize money: $115,000
- Surface: Hard
- Location: Tampico, Mexico
- Venue: Centro Libanés Mexicano de Tampico

Champions

Singles
- (Canada) Marina Stakusic

Doubles
- (United States) Carmen Corley / (Canada) Rebecca Marino
← 2023 ·	Abierto Tampico	· 2025 →

The 2024 Abierto Tampico was a professional women's tennis tournament played on outdoor hard courts. It was the eighth edition of the tournament and a 2024 WTA 125 tournament. It took place at the Centro Libanés Mexicano de Tampico in Tampico, Mexico, between 21 and 26 October 2024.

== Singles entrants ==
=== Seeds ===
Country	Player	Rank^{1}	Seed
ESP	Nuria Párrizas Díaz	82	1
GER	Jule Niemeier	83	2
ARG	María Lourdes Carlé	88	3
GER	Tatjana Maria	94	4
	Anna Blinkova	99	5
ESP	Sara Sorribes Tormo	104	6
USA	Robin Montgomery	107	7
AUS	Maya Joint	109	8

- ^{1} Rankings as of 14 October 2024.

=== Other entrants ===
The following players received a wildcard into the singles main draw:

- (Mexico) Jéssica Hinojosa Gómez
- (France) Elsa Jacquemot
- (Mexico) Victoria Rodríguez
- (Mexico) Ana Sofía Sánchez

The following players received entry using a protected ranking:

- Alina Korneeva
- (Serbia) Nina Stojanović

The following players received entry from the qualifying draw:

- (United States) Varvara Lepchenko
- (Ukraine) Anastasiia Sobolieva
- (Canada) Marina Stakusic
- (India) Sahaja Yamalapalli

== Doubles entrants ==
=== Seeds ===
Country	Player	Country	Player	Rank^{1}	Seed
~~GEO~~	~~Oksana Kalashnikova~~		~~Iryna Shymanovich~~	~~171~~	~~1~~
	~~Anna Blinkova~~		~~Anastasia Tikhonova~~	~~223~~	~~2~~
USA	Quinn Gleason	BRA	Ingrid Martins	239	3
ARG	María Lourdes Carlé	NED	Eva Vedder	297	4

- ^{1} Rankings as of 14 October 2024.

=== Other entrants ===
The following pair received a wildcard into the doubles main draw:

- (Mexico) Jéssica Hinojosa Gómez / (United States) Lyla Middleton

== Champions ==
=== Singles ===
- (Canada) Marina Stakusic def. Anna Blinkova 6–4, 2–6, 6–4

=== Doubles ===
- (United States) Carmen Corley / (Canada) Rebecca Marino def. Alina Korneeva / Polina Kudermetova, 6–3, 6–3
