= 1998 ENKA Ladies Open =

- Date: 3–9 August
- Edition: Only
- Category: Tier IV
- Draw: 32S / 16D
- Prize money: $107,500
- Surface: Hard / outdoor
- Location: Istanbul, Turkey

Champions

Singles
- (Slovakia) Henrieta Nagyová

Doubles
- (Germany) Meike Babel / (Belgium) Laurence Courtois
| ENKA Ladies Open |

The 1998 ENKA Ladies Open was a women's tennis tournament played on outdoor hard courts in Istanbul in Turkey that was part of Tier IV category of the 1998 WTA Tour. It was the only edition of the tournament and was held from 3 August until 9 August 1998. First-seeded Henrieta Nagyová won the singles title.

== Finals ==
=== Singles ===
(Slovakia) Henrieta Nagyová defeated (Belarus) Olga Barabanschikova 6–4, 3–6, 7–6^{(11–9)}

- It was Nagyová's 2nd and last singles title of the year and the 4th of her career.

=== Doubles ===
(Germany) Meike Babel / (Belgium) Laurence Courtois defeated (Sweden) Åsa Carlsson / (Argentina) Florencia Labat 6–0, 6–2

- It was Babel's only title of the year and the 1st of her career. It was Courtois' only title of the year and the 2nd of her career.
