= 1998 ENKA Ladies Open – Singles =

Singles
- 1998 ENKA Ladies Open

Final
- Champion: (Slovakia) Henrieta Nagyová
- Runner-up: (Belarus) Olga Barabanschikova
- Score: 6–4, 3–6, 7–6^{(11–9)}

Details
- Draw: 32
- Seeds: 8

Events
Singles	Doubles
ENKA Ladies Open

The 1998 ENKA Ladies Open – Singles was an event of the 1998 ENKA Ladies Open women's tennis tournament and played on outdoor hardcourts in Istanbul, Turkey. First seeded Henrieta Nagyová won in the final 6–4, 3–6, 7–6^{(11–9)} against Olga Barabanschikova.

== Seeds ==
A champion seed is indicated in bold text while text in italics indicates the round in which that seed was eliminated.

1. (Slovakia) **Henrieta Nagyová (champion)**
2. (Belgium) Sabine Appelmans (first round)
3. (France) Sarah Pitkowski (first round)
4. (Argentina) Florencia Labat (semifinals)
5. (Russia) Tatiana Panova (first round)
6. (Israel) Anna Smashnova (quarterfinals)
7. (Belarus) Olga Barabanschikova (final)
8. (Netherlands) Kristie Boogert (first round)

== Draw ==
Key

- Q = Qualifier
- WC = Wild card
- LL = Lucky loser
- Alt = Alternate
- ITF = ITF entry
- PR = Protected ranking
- SR = Special ranking
- SE = Special exempt
- JE = Junior exempt
- JR = Junior Accelerator Programme entrant
- CO = College Accelerator Programme entrant
- NG = Next Gen Accelerator Program entrant
- w/o = Walkover
- r = Retired
- d = Defaulted

First round
1	(Slovakia) **H Nagyová**	**6**	**6**
Q	(Belgium) L Courtois	2	3
WC	(Turkey) C Keyman	0	2
(Czech Republic) **D Chládková**	**6**	**6**
(Spain) **M Sánchez Lorenzo**	**6**	**6**
(Italy) F Perfetti	0	1
(United States) **M Shaughnessy**	**6**	**6**
5	(Russia) T Panova	3	4
4	(Argentina) **F Labat**	**6**	4	**6**
(Ukraine) O Lugina	4	**6**	4
(Sweden) Å Carlsson	4	3
Q	(Romania) **R Sandu**	**6**	**6**
Q	(France) **É Loit**	**6**	**6**
WC	(Turkey) C Konuk	0	0
(Japan) **H Inoue**	**6**	2	**6**
8	(Netherlands) K Boogert	4	**6**	4
7	(Belarus) **O Barabanschikova**	**6**	**6**
(France) A Dechaume-Balleret	0	3
(Austria) M Maruska	3	6
(Czech Republic) **L Němečková**	**6**	**7**
(Czech Republic) **R Bobková**	**6**	**7**
(Spain) C Torrens Valero	4	5
(Italy) **F Lubiani**	**6**	**6**
3	(France) S Pitkowski	2	1
6	(Israel) **A Smashnova**	**6**	**7**
(Germany) M Babel	2	5
(Germany) J Kandarr	1	3
(France) **A Cocheteux**	**6**	**6**
Q	(Belgium) E Callens	**6**	1	2
(Netherlands) **S Noorlander**	3	**6**	**6**
(Italy) **L Golarsa**	**7**	**6**
2	(Belgium) S Appelmans	6	3

Second round
1	(Slovakia) **H Nagyová**	**6**	**6**
(Czech Republic) D Chládková	3	1
(Spain) M Sánchez Lorenzo	3	3
(United States) **M Shaughnessy**	**6**	**6**
4	(Argentina) **F Labat**	**6**	**6**
Q	(Romania) R Sandu	3	1
Q	(France) É Loit	3	4
(Japan) **H Inoue**	**6**	**6**
7	(Belarus) **O Barabanschikova**	**7**	**7**
(Czech Republic) L Němečková	6	5
(Czech Republic) R Bobková	**6**	2	r
(Italy) **F Lubiani**	2	**5**
6	(Israel) **A Smashnova**	**6**	3	**6**
(France) A Cocheteux	2	**6**	4
(Netherlands) S Noorlander	4	2
(Italy) **L Golarsa**	**6**	**6**

Quarterfinals
1	(Slovakia) **H Nagyová**	**6**	**6**
(United States) M Shaughnessy	4	4
4	(Argentina) **F Labat**	**6**	3	**6**
(Japan) H Inoue	3	**6**	4
7	(Belarus) **O Barabanschikova**	**6**	**6**
(Italy) F Lubiani	2	3
6	(Israel) A Smashnova	**6**	4	4
(Italy) **L Golarsa**	3	**6**	**6**

Semifinals
1	(Slovakia) **H Nagyová**	**7**	**6**
4	(Argentina) F Labat	6	0
7	(Belarus) **O Barabanschikova**	**6**	**7**
(Italy) L Golarsa	1	6

Final
1	(Slovakia) **Henrieta Nagyová**	**6**	3	**7**
7	(Belarus) O Barabanschikova	4	**6**	6
