= Clervie Ngounoue =

American tennis player (born 2006)

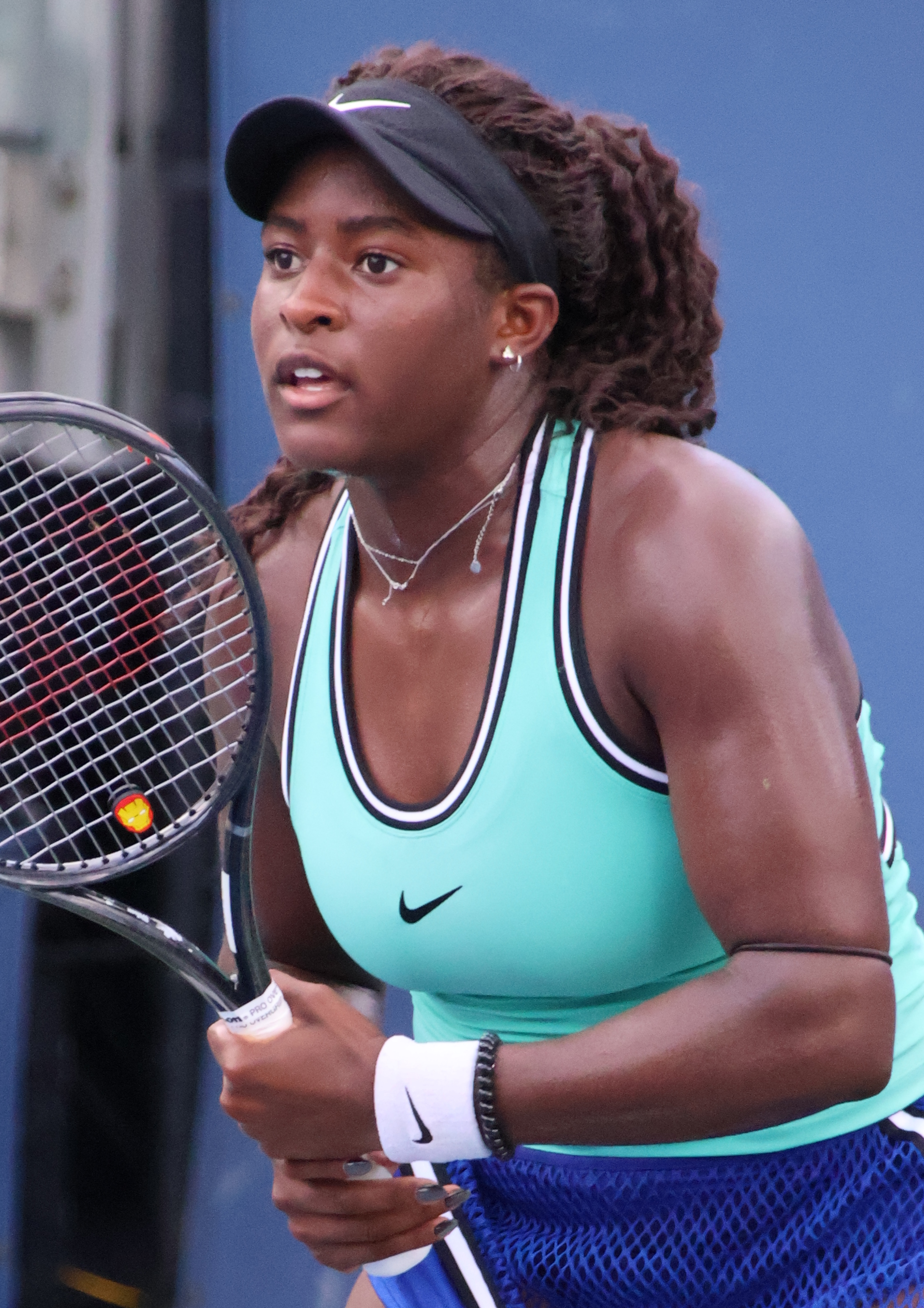
- Ngounoue at the 2026 US Open
- Country (sports): United States
- Born: July 19, 2006 (age 20) Washington, D.C.
- Height: 1.69 m (5 ft 7 in)
- Plays: Right (two-handed backhand)
- Prize money: $629,513

Singles
- Career record: 110–64
- Career titles: 5 ITF
- Highest ranking: No. 169 (November 10, 2025)
- Current ranking: No. 508 (August 31, 2026)

Grand Slam singles results
- Wimbledon: Q2 (2026)
- US Open: 1R (2023, 2025)

Doubles
- Career record: 64–27
- Career titles: 5 ITF
- Highest ranking: No. 187 (August 19, 2024)
- Current ranking: No. 236 (August 31, 2026)

Grand Slam doubles results
- US Open: 3R (2023)

Grand Slam mixed doubles results
- US Open: 1R (2024)
- Last updated on: 30 June 2026.

Clervie Ngounoue (born 19 July 2006) is an American tennis player. She has a career-high singles ranking of world No. 169 by the WTA, achieved on 10 November 2025, and a best doubles ranking of No. 187, achieved on 17 August 2024.

== Early life ==
Ngounoue was born in Washington, D.C. to Cameroonian parents. From an early age she showed talent for tennis, and her father Aimé Ngounoue helped her begin to train.

== Career ==
At the 2022 US Open, she and Reese Brantmeier received a wildcard into the women's doubles tournament. They defeated Alison Van Uytvanck and Rosalie van der Hoek in the first round, recording their first major victory, before losing to eventual semifinalists, Nicole Melichar-Martinez and Ellen Perez, in three sets in the second.

Ngounoue won the 2023 Wimbledon junior title, defeating Nikola Bartůňková in the final. On the ITF Junior Circuit, she climbed the top of the world rankings on 5 June 2023. Ngounoue also won the 2022 Australian Open girls' doubles event, partnering with Diana Shnaider. She also won the girls' doubles title at the 2023 French Open, alongside partner Tyra Caterina Grant, against the top seeds Alina Korneeva and Sara Saito.

Ngounoue qualified into the 2025 Indian Wells Open making her WTA 1000 debut. Ranked No. 211, she also qualified for the 2025 Cincinnati Open and recorded her first tour-level and WTA 1000 win over Hailey Baptiste moving to a new career-high in the top 200. She was handed a wildcard to both the singles and doubles at the US Open, losing her first-round singles match to Anna Kalinskaya.

== Performance timeline ==
Key
W	F	SF	QF	#R	RR	Q#	DNQ	A	NH

(W) winner; (F) finalist; (SF) semifinalist; (QF) quarterfinalist; (#R) rounds 4, 3, 2, 1; (RR) round-robin stage; (Q#) qualification round; (DNQ) did not qualify; (A) absent; (NH) not held; (SR) strike rate (events won / competed); (W–L) win–loss record.
To avoid confusion and double counting, these charts are updated at the conclusion of a tournament or when the player's participation has ended.

Only main-draw results in WTA Tour, Grand Slam tournaments, Billie Jean King Cup, United Cup, Hopman Cup and Olympic Games are included in win–loss records.

=== Singles ===
Current through the 2026 US Open

Tournament	2021	2022	2023	2024	2025	2026	SR	W–L
Grand Slam tournaments
Australian Open	A	A	A	A	A	A	0 / 0	0–0
French Open	A	A	A	A	A	A	0 / 0	0–0
Wimbledon	A	A	A	Q1	A	Q2	0 / 0	0–0
US Open	Q1	A	1R	Q1	1R	Q1	0 / 2	0–2
Win–loss	0–0	0–0	0–1	0–0	0–1	0–0	0 / 2	0–2
Indian Wells	A	A	A	A	1R	A	0 / 1	0–1
Career statistics
Tournaments	0	0	2	2	1		Total: 3	
Overall win–loss	0–0	0–0	0–2	0–2	0–1		0 / 5	0–5
Year-end ranking	n/a	600	511	325	169		$179,858	

== ITF Circuit finals ==
=== Singles: 9 (5 titles, 4 runner-ups) ===
Legend W50 tournaments W25/35 tournaments W15 tournaments	Finals by surface Hard (4–3) Clay (1–1)

Result	W–L	Date	Tournament	Tier	Surface	Opponent	Score
Loss	0–1	Mar 2022	ITF Marrakech, Morocco	W15	Clay	(Italy) Eleonora Alvisi	3–6, 1–6
Loss	0–2	Oct 2022	ITF Austin, United States	W25	Hard	(United States) Peyton Stearns	1–6, 0–6
Win	1–2	Jan 2024	ITF Naples, United States	W35	Clay	(United States) Allie Kiick	6–1, 6–1
Win	2–2	Jul 2024	Dallas Summer Series, United States	W50	Hard (i)	(United States) Robin Anderson	2–6, 6–3, 7–5
Win	3–2	Nov 2024	ITF Santo Domingo, Dominican Republic	W35	Hard	(Turkey) Çağla Büyükakçay	6–3, 4–6, 6–2
Loss	3–3	Jan 2025	ITF Le Lamentin (Martinique), France	W35	Hard	(Canada) Victoria Mboko	5–7, 3–6
Loss	3–4	Jan 2025	ITF Petit-Bourg (Guadeloupe), France	W35	Hard	(Canada) Victoria Mboko	4–6, 0–6
Win	4–4	Feb 2025	ITF Birmingham, UK	W50	Hard (i)	(Slovakia) Viktória Hrunčáková	4–6, 6–2, 6–3
Win	5–4	Jun 2025	ITF Palma del Río, Spain	W50	Hard	(Netherlands) Eva Vedder	6–1, 6–4

=== Doubles: 14 (5 titles, 9 runner-ups) ===
Legend W100 tournaments W75 tournaments W50 tournaments W25/35 tournaments W15 tournaments	Finals by surface Hard (5–7) Clay (0–2)

Result	W–L	Date	Tournament	Tier	Surface	Partner	Opponents	Score
Loss	0–1	May 2021	ITF Cairo, Egypt	W15	Clay	(Egypt) Yasmin Ezzat	(Romania) Oana Gavrilă (Kazakhstan) Zhibek Kulambayeva	4–6, 0–6
Loss	0–2	Feb 2022	ITF Monastir, Tunisia	W15	Hard	(Belgium) Sofia Costoulas	(Belarus) Kristina Dmitruk (Russia) Maria Sholokhova	6–3, 2–6, [5–10]
Win	1–2	Feb 2022	ITF Monastir, Tunisia	W15	Hard	(Belgium) Hanne Vandewinkel	(Germany) Mara Guth (Germany) Mia Mack	6–1, 6–2
Loss	1–3	Mar 2022	ITF Marrakech, Morocco	W15	Clay	(Croatia) Lucija Ćirić Bagarić	(Switzerland) Naïma Karamoko (Portugal) Inês Murta	2–6, 7–6^{(2)}, [5–10]
Loss	1–4	Oct 2022	ITF Florence, United States	W25	Hard	(United States) Samantha Crawford	(United States) Allura Zamarripa (United States) Maribella Zamarripa	3–6, 4–6
Loss	1–5	Jan 2023	ITF Petit-Bourg, France (Guadeloupe)	W25	Hard	(Denmark) Johanne Svendsen	(Switzerland) Jenny Dürst (Sweden) Fanny Östlund	4–6, 3–6
Win	2–5	Mar 2023	ITF Spring, United States	W25	Hard	(United States) Maria Mateas	(United Kingdom) Sofia Johnson (Ukraine) Yulia Starodubtseva	6-4, 2-6, [10-4]
Win	3–5	Oct 2023	ITF Redding, United States	W25	Hard	(United States) Liv Hovde	(Canada) Kayla Cross (Colombia) María Herazo González	6–3, 7–5
Loss	3–6	Sep 2024	ITF Redding, United States	W35	Hard	(Japan) Himeno Sakatsume	(United States) Ayana Akli (United States) Eryn Cayetano	2–6, 2–6
Win	4–6	Oct 2024	Tyler Pro Challenge, United States	W100	Hard	(Australia) Alexandra Osborne	(United States) Mary Lewis (United States) Brandy Walker	6–2, 6–3
Loss	4–7	Jan 2025	ITF Le Lamentin, France (Martinique)	W35	Hard	(Poland) Olivia Lincer	(Canada) Cadence Brace (Canada) Victoria Mboko	2–6, 6–7^{(2)}
Win	5–7	Jan 2025	ITF Petit-Bourg, France	W35	Hard	(Canada) Victoria Mboko	(United States) Jenna Dean (Mexico) Amanda Nava Elkin	6–3, 6–1
Loss	5–8	Mar 2025	ITF Santo Domingo, Dominican Republic	W50	Hard	(United States) Ayana Akli	Anastasia Tikhonova; Mariia Tkacheva	6–7^{(5)}, 7–6^{(2)}, [7–10]
Loss	5–9	Nov 2026	Kyotec Open, Luxembourg	W75	Hard (i)	(United States) Malkia Ngounoue	(Germany) Tessa Brockmann (Germany) Ella Seidel	4–6, 3–6

== Junior Grand Slam tournament finals ==
=== Singles: 1 (title) ===
Result	Year	Tournament	Surface	Opponent	Score
Win	2023	Wimbledon	Grass	(Czech Republic) Nikola Bartůňková	6–2, 6–2

=== Doubles: 2 (2 titles) ===
Result	Year	Tournament	Surface	Partner	Opponents	Score
Win	2022	Australian Open	Hard	(Russia) Diana Shnaider	(Canada) Kayla Cross (Canada) Victoria Mboko	6–4, 6–3
Win	2023	French Open	Clay	(United States) Tyra Caterina Grant	Alina Korneeva (Japan) Sara Saito	6–3, 6–2
