= Kayla Cross =

Canadian tennis player (born 2005)

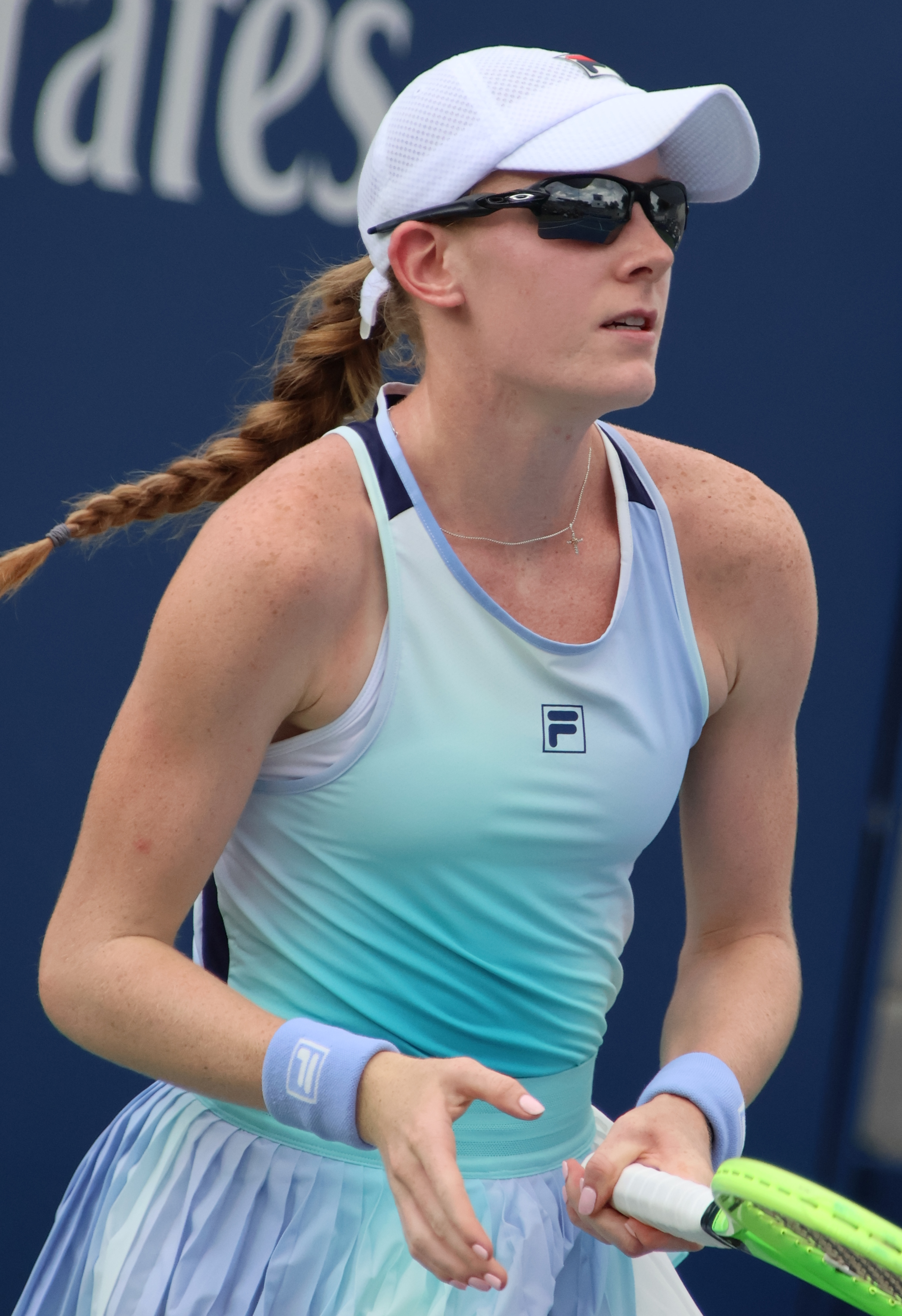
- Cross at the 2026 US Open
- Country (sports): Canada
- Residence: London, Ontario, Canada
- Born: 21 March 2005 (age 21) London, Ontario
- Height: 1.76 m (5 ft 9 in)
- Plays: Left (two-handed backhand)
- Prize money: $419,707

Singles
- Career record: 160–118
- Career titles: 3 ITF
- Highest ranking: No. 157 (21 September 2026)
- Current ranking: No. 197 (9 November 2026)

Grand Slam singles results
- Australian Open: Q1 (2026)
- French Open: Q1 (2025, 2026)
- Wimbledon: Q1 (2025, 2026)
- US Open: Q1 (2026)

Doubles
- Career record: 127–80
- Career titles: 1 WTA 125, 11 ITF
- Highest ranking: No. 127 (2 February 2026)
- Current ranking: No. 200 (9 November 2026)
- Last updated on: 9 November 2026.

Kayla Cross (born 21 March 2005) is a Canadian tennis player. She has a career-high singles ranking of world No. 157, reached on 21 September 2026. Her career-high doubles ranking is No. 127, achieved on 2 February 2026. Cross has won one WTA 125 doubles title as well as three singles and eleven doubles titles on the ITF Women's World Tennis Tour.

== Career ==
=== 2022: Juniors, WTA Tour debut ===
Partnering Victoria Mboko, Cross reached the finals of two junior Grand Slam tournaments in 2022, losing both doubles competitions at the Australian Open and at Wimbledon.

She qualified to make her WTA Tour main-draw debut at the Championnats Banque Nationale de Granby, losing to fourth seed Anna Bondár in the first round. Having lost as a wildcard entrant in the first singles qualifying round, she played in the Canadian Open partnering Victoria Mboko. They lost in the first round to Asia Muhammad and Ena Shibahara in a deciding champions tiebreak.

=== 2023–24: WTA 125 doubles final ===
Cross was runner-up at the now downgraded W75 2024 Championnats de Granby, losing to Maria Mateas in the final.

She won the doubles title at the W75 2024 Calgary Challenger alongside Maribella Zamarripa, defeating Robin Anderson and Dalayna Hewitt in a champions tiebreak in the final.

Partnering Liv Hovde, Cross reached her first WTA 125 final in doubles at the 2024 Fifth Third Charleston 125, losing to Nuria Brancaccio and Leyre Romero Gormaz.

=== 2025–26: BJK Cup debut, first WTA Tour win ===
Cross made her debut for the Canada Billie Jean King Cup team against Romania in the 2025 qualifying round held in Tokyo, partnering Rebecca Marino in a win over Georgia Crăciun and Mara Gae.

Given a wildcard entry into the main-draw at the 2025 Canadian Open, she lost to Kamilla Rakhimova in the first round.

Teaming with Amelia Rajecki, she won her first WTA 125 title in doubles at the 2025 Abierto Tampico, defeating Weronika Falkowska and Kristina Novak in the final.

Cross was given a wildcard entry into the 2026 Canadian Open where she recorded her maiden tour-level win over world No. 72 Katie Boulter. She lost to 28th seed Ann Li in the second round.

== Grand Slam singles performance timeline ==
Key
W	F	SF	QF	#R	RR	Q#	P#	DNQ	A	Z#	PO	G	S	B	NMS	NTI	P	NH

(W) winner; (F) finalist; (SF) semifinalist; (QF) quarterfinalist; (#R) rounds 4, 3, 2, 1; (RR) round-robin stage; (Q#) qualification round; (P#) preliminary round; (DNQ) did not qualify; (A) absent; (Z#) Davis/Fed Cup Zonal Group (with number indication) or (PO) play-off; (G) gold, (S) silver or (B) bronze Olympic/Paralympic medal; (NMS) not a Masters tournament; (NTI) not a Tier I tournament; (P) postponed; (NH) not held; (SR) strike rate (events won / competed); (W–L) win–loss record.
To avoid confusion and double counting, these charts are updated at the conclusion of a tournament or when the player's participation has ended.

Tournament	2025	2026	W–L
Australian Open	A	Q1	0–0
French Open	Q1	Q1	0–0
Wimbledon	Q1	Q1	0–0
US Open	A	Q1	0–0
Win–loss	0–0	0–0	0–0

== WTA 125 finals ==
=== Doubles: 2 (1 title, 1 runner-up) ===
Result	W–L	Date	Tournament	Surface	Partner	Opponents	Score
Loss	0–1	Nov 2024	Charleston Pro, United States	Clay	(United States) Liv Hovde	(Italy) Nuria Brancaccio (Spain) Leyre Romero Gormaz	6–7^{(6–8)}, 2–6
Win	1–1	Oct 2025	Abierto Tampico, Mexico	Hard	(United Kingdom) Amelia Rajecki	(Poland) Weronika Falkowska (Slovenia) Kristina Novak	6–4, 6–3

== ITF Circuit finals ==
=== Singles: 10 (4 titles, 6 runner-ups) ===
Legend W75 tournaments W50 tournaments W35 tournaments	Finals by surface Hard (4–5) Clay (0–1)

Result	W–L	Date	Tournament	Tier	Surface	Opponent	Score
Loss	0–1	Jul 2024	Championnats de Granby, Canada	W75	Hard	(United States) Maria Mateas	3–6, 6–7^{(3)}
Win	1–1	Aug 2024	Saskatoon Challenger, Canada	W35	Hard	(Canada) Mia Kupres	4–6, 6–4, 6–4
Loss	1–2	Oct 2024	Toronto Challenger, Canada	W75	Hard (i)	(United States) Louisa Chirico	6–7^{(3)}, 3–6
Win	2–2	Feb 2025	Arcadia Pro Open, United States	W35	Hard	(United States) Iva Jovic	6–2, 7–6^{(6)}
Loss	2–3	Sep 2025	Templeton Open, United States	W75	Hard	(United States) Kayla Day	2–6, 0–3 ret.
Loss	2–4	Nov 2025	ITF Chihuahua, Mexico	W50	Hard	(United States) Mary Stoiana	6–7^{(2)}, 7–6^{(6)}, 2–6
Loss	2–5	Nov 2025	Internazionali Val Gardena, Italy	W50	Hard (i)	(Spain) Eva Guerrero Álvarez	4–6, 4–6
Loss	2–6	Mar 2026	ITF Chihuahua, Mexico	W50	Clay	(United States) Julieta Pareja	3–6, 6–7^{(5)}
Win	3–6	Jul 2026	Championnats de Granby, Canada	W75	Hard	(Japan) Sara Saito	7–5, 6–1
Win	4–6	Nov 2026	ITF Chihuahua, Mexico	W50	Hard	(Romania) Miriam Bulgaru	6–7^{(5)}, 7–5, 6–3

=== Doubles: 21 (11 titles, 10 runner-ups) ===
Legend W100 tournaments W60/75 tournaments W40/50 tournaments W25/35 tournaments	Finals by surface Hard (8–6) Clay (3–4)

Result	W–L	Date	Tournament	Tier	Surface	Partner	Opponents	Score
Win	1–0	Jul 2022	ITF Saskatoon, Canada	W25	Hard	(Canada) Marina Stakusic	(United States) Kendra Bunch (Serbia) Katarina Kozarov	6–3, 7–6^{(4)}
Loss	1–1	Nov 2022	Calgary Challenger, Canada	W60	Hard (i)	(Canada) Marina Stakusic	(United States) Catherine Harrison (United States) Sabrina Santamaria	6–7^{(2)}, 4–6
Loss	1–2	Jan 2023	ITF Boca Raton, US	W25	Clay	(Mexico) Renata Zarazúa	(France) Tiphanie Fiquet (United States) Ashley Lahey	6–4, 1–6, [4–10]
Loss	1–3	May 2023	ITF Feld am See, Austria	W25	Clay	(Belgium) Sofia Costoulas	(Czech Republic) Denisa Hindová (United States) Chiara Scholl	2–6, 0–6
Loss	1–4	Jun 2023	ITF Otočec, Slovenia	W40	Clay	(United States) Sofia Sewing	(Georgia (country)) Ekaterine Gorgodze (United States) Elvina Kalieva	2–6, 3–6
Loss	1–5	Oct 2023	ITF Redding, US	W25	Hard	(Colombia) María Herazo González	(United States) Liv Hovde (United States) Clervie Ngounoue	3–6, 5–7
Loss	1–6	Oct 2023	Toronto Challenger, Canada	W60	Hard (i)	(United States) Liv Hovde	(United States) Carmen Corley (United States) Ivana Corley	7–6^{(6)}, 3–6, [3–10]
Win	2–6	Oct 2023	ITF Edmonton, Canada	W25	Hard (i)	(United States) Liv Hovde	(United States) Allura Zamarripa (United States) Maribella Zamarripa	4–6, 6–4, [10–7]
Loss	2–7	Nov 2023	ITF Lousada, Portugal	W25	Hard (i)	Elena Pridankina	(Belgium) Eliessa Vanlangendonck (Netherlands) Stéphanie Visscher	w/o
Win	3–7	May 2024	ITF Bethany Beach, US	W35	Clay	(United States) Jaeda Daniel	(United States) Ashton Bowers (United States) Mia Yamakita	7–6^{(3)}, 7–6^{(2)}
Win	4–7	Sep 2024	ITF Punta Cana, Dominican Republic	W35	Clay	(Canada) Ariana Arseneault	(Belgium) Margaux Maquet (Spain) María Martínez Vaquero	6–4, 7–6^{(5)}
Win	5–7	Sep 2024	ITF Punta Cana, Dom. Rep.	W35	Clay	(Canada) Ariana Arseneault	(Kazakhstan) Zhibek Kulambayeva (India) Sahaja Yamalapalli	6–1, 5–7, [10–8]
Win	6–7	Oct 2024	ITF Edmonton, Canada	W35	Hard (i)	(United States) Maribella Zamarripa	(United States) Jessica Failla (United States) Anna Rogers	6–3, 6–1
Win	7–7	Oct 2024	Calgary Challenger, Canada	W75	Hard (i)	(United States) Maribella Zamarripa	(United States) Robin Anderson (United States) Dalayna Hewitt	6–7^{(3)}, 7–5, [12–10]
Win	8–7	Nov 2024	ITF Miami, US	W35	Hard	(United States) Anna Rogers	(Morocco) Aya El Aouni (Poland) Olivia Lincer	7–5, 6–4
Loss	8–8	Apr 2025	Charlottesville Open, US	W100	Hard	(Australia) Petra Hule	Maria Kozyreva; Iryna Shymanovich	5–7, 5–7
Win	9–8	Sep 2025	ITF Leiria, Portugal	W50	Hard	(France) Julie Belgraver	(United States) Catherine Harrison (United States) Ashley Lahey	3–6, 6–3, [10–8]
Win	10–8	Nov 2025	Internazionali Val Gardena, Italy	W50	Hard (i)	(United States) Anna Rogers	(Italy) Samira de Stefano (Italy) Gaia Maduzzi	7–6^{(4)}, 7–6^{(7)}
Win	11–8	Jan 2026	San Diego Open, US	W100	Hard	(United States) Alana Smith	(United States) Catherine Harrison (United States) Dalayna Hewitt	6–2, 6–3
Loss	11–9	Jul 2026	Evansville Classic, US	W100	Hard	(United States) Anna Rogers	(Chinese Taipei) Cho I-hsuan (Chinese Taipei) Cho Yi-tsen	2–6, 3–6
Loss	11–10	Nov 2026	ITF Chihuahua, Mexico	W50	Hard	(Greece) Despina Papamichail	(Ukraine) Valeriya Strakhova; Anastasia Tikhonova	0–6, 6–7^{(4)}

== Junior Grand Slam tournament finals ==
=== Doubles: 2 (2 runner-ups) ===
Result	Year	Tournament	Surface	Partner	Opponents	Score
Loss	2022	Australian Open	Hard	(Canada) Victoria Mboko	(United States) Clervie Ngounoue (Russia) Diana Shnaider	4–6, 3–6
Loss	2022	Wimbledon	Grass	(Canada) Victoria Mboko	(Netherlands) Rose Marie Nijkamp (Kenya) Angella Okutoyi	6–3, 4–6, [9–11]
