= Cadence Brace =

Canadian tennis player (born 2005)

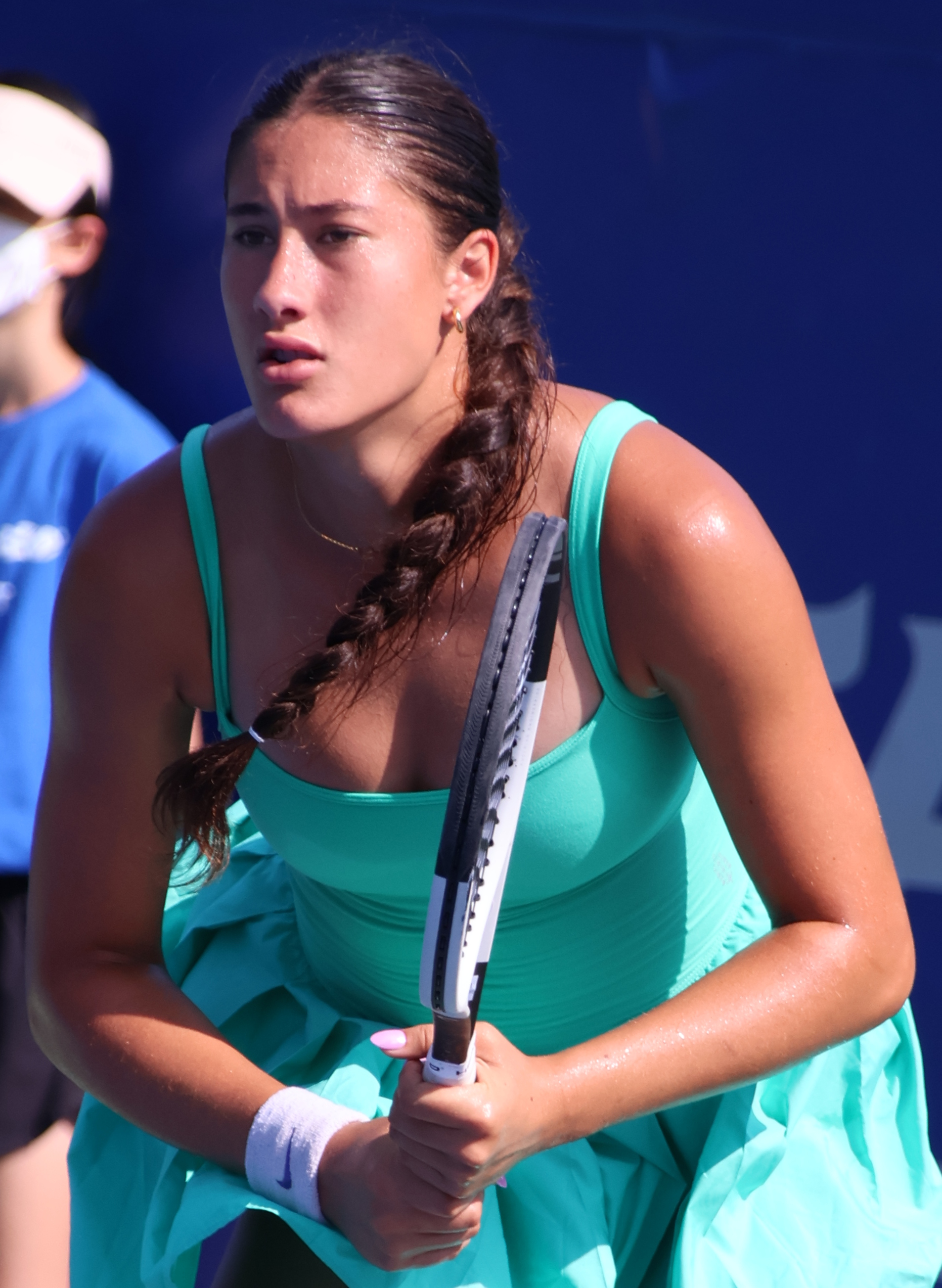
- Brace at the 2026 Cary Tennis Classic
- Country (sports): Canada
- Born: 25 February 2005 (age 21) Toronto, Ontario, Canada
- Height: 1.75 m (5 ft 9 in)
- Turned pro: 2022
- Plays: Right-handed
- Prize money: $194,635

Singles
- Career record: 131–94
- Career titles: 1 ITF
- Highest ranking: No. 182 (20 October 2025)
- Current ranking: No. 202 (25 May 2026)

Grand Slam singles results
- Australian Open: Q1 (2026)
- French Open: Q1 (2026)
- Wimbledon: Q1 (2026)
- US Open: Q2 (2025)

Doubles
- Career record: 20–31
- Career titles: 1 ITF
- Highest ranking: No. 371 (7 April 2025)
- Current ranking: No. 1102 (25 May 2026)
- Last updated on: 25 May 2026.

Cadence Brace (born 25 February 2005) is a Canadian tennis player. She has a career-high WTA ranking in singles of 182, achieved on 20 October 2025. She also has a career-high WTA doubles ranking of 371, reached on 7 April 2025.

== Career ==
Brace reached her first ITF Circuit final at the W15 event in Lambare, Paraguay, in December 2021, losing to Lara Escauriza.

In August 2022, she defeated third seed Claire Liu to reach the second round at the WTA 125 event in Vancouver, where she lost to eventual champion Valentini Grammatikopoulou.

Brace made her WTA main-draw debut at the 2022 Championnats de Granby, after qualifying for the singles draw. She defeated seventh seed Kaja Juvan in the first round, before losing to Wang Xiyu in her next match.

She won her first ITF Circuit title at the W35 tournament in Wichita, Kansas, in June 2024, defeating top seed Victoria Hu in the final.

In August 2024, Brace joined the Louisiana State University tennis program.

She reached her first WTA 125 final at the 2025 Abierto Tampico, losing to Hanne Vandewinkel in straight sets.

Brace was named in the Canadian team for the 2025 Billie Jean King Cup play-offs and made her debut in their first group match against Denmark, losing to Rebecca Munk Mortensen in three sets.

== WTA 125 finals ==
=== Singles: 1 (runner-up) ===
Result	W–L	Date	Tournament	Surface	Opponent	Score
Loss	0–1	Oct 2025	Abierto Tampico, Mexico	Hard	(Belgium) Hanne Vandewinkel	4–6, 3–6

== ITF Circuit finals ==
=== Singles: 4 (2 title, 2 runner-ups) ===
Legend W75 tournaments W35 tournaments W15 tournaments	Finals by surface Hard (2–1) Clay (0–1)

Result	W–L	Date	Tournament	Tier	Surface	Opponents	Score
Loss	0–1	Dec 2021	ITF Lambare, Paraguay	W15	Clay	(Paraguay) Lara Escauriza	3–6, 1–6
Win	1–1	Jun 2024	ITF Wichita, United States	W35	Hard	(United States) Victoria Hu	7–5, 4–6, 6–3
Loss	1–2	Jun 2025	Sumter Pro Open, United States	W75	Hard	(Czech Republic) Darja Vidmanova	5–7, 1–6
Win	2–2	Aug 2026	ITF Barueri, Brazil	W35	Hard	(China) Mi Lan	1–6, 7–5, 6–3

=== Doubles: 1 (title) ===
Legend W35 tournaments (1–0)	Finals by surface Hard (1–0)

Result	W–L	Date	Tournament	Tier	Surface	Partner	Opponents	Score
Win	1–0	Jan 2025	ITF Le Lamentin, France (Martinique)	W35	Hard	(Canada) Victoria Mboko	(Poland) Olivia Lincer (United States) Clervie Ngounoue	6–2, 7–6^{(2)}
