= Hanne Vandewinkel =

Belgian tennis player (born 2004)

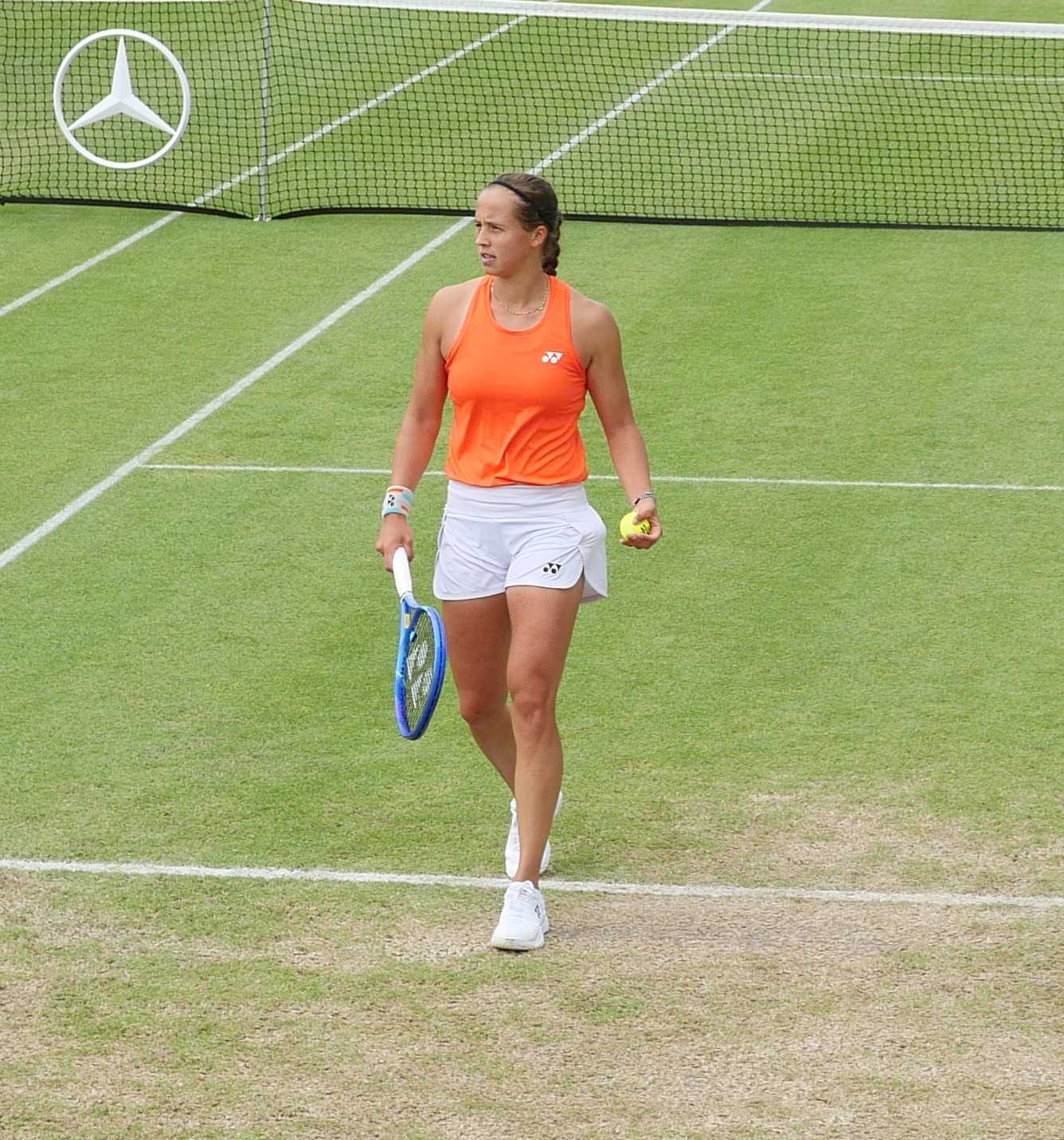
- Vandewinkel at the 2026 Rosmalen Open
- Country (sports): Belgium
- Residence: Zutendaal, Limburg
- Born: 21 May 2004 (age 22) Bree, Belgium
- Height: 1.78 m (5 ft 10 in)
- Turned pro: 2021
- Plays: Right-handed (two-handed backhand)
- Prize money: US$ 810,480

Singles
- Career record: 226–108
- Career titles: 1 WTA 125
- Highest ranking: No. 77 (24 August 2026)
- Current ranking: No. 84 (21 September 2026)

Grand Slam singles results
- Australian Open: Q1 (2025, 2026)
- French Open: 1R (2026)
- Wimbledon: 1R (2026)
- US Open: 1R (2026)

Doubles
- Career record: 42–25
- Career titles: 3 ITF
- Highest ranking: No. 333 (21 September 2026)
- Current ranking: No. 333 (21 September 2026)

Grand Slam doubles results
- French Open: 2R (2026)
- US Open: 1R (2026)

Team competitions
- Fed Cup: 1–4
- Last updated on: 26 September 2026.

Hanne Vandewinkel (born 21 May 2004) is a Belgian professional tennis player. She has career-high rankings of world No. 77 in singles achieved on 24 August 2026, and No. 352 in doubles, achieved on 20 July 2026. Vandewinkel has won one WTA 125 singles title as well as twelve singles and three doubles titles on the ITF Circuit.

== Early life ==
Vandewinkel grew up in Zutendaal, Limburg. She trained at the Wilson Luxilon Tenkie Academy in Hasselt.

== Career ==
=== Juniors ===
In October 2020, she won the J3 Lousada Junior Cup II, defeating Clervie Ngounoue in the final. In April 2021, she won the J2 Haskovo Cup, defeating Lisa Pigato in the final. The following month, she made her junior major debut at the French Open, before she lost in the second round to Océane Babel.

=== Professional ===
In November 2022, she won three-back to back 15k titles in Monastir. In March 2023, she won the 15k event in Manacor. In August 2023, she reached the final of the 25k Flanders Ladies Trophy in Koksijde, but lost to Dejana Radanović. In doubles, she and compatriot Amélie Van Impe reached the semifinals. That November, she won the 25k Kaeline WTT Pro Series in Limassol, defeating compatriot Sofia Costoulas in the final.

In March 2024, she reached the final of the 40k Wiphold International in Pretoria, but lost to top seed Laura Pigossi. That August, she won the 40k SIERS ITF event in Oldenzaal, defeating Polina Kudermetova in the final. In March 2025, she received a wildcard into the qualifying competition of the Indian Wells Open, but lost in the first round.

Vandewinkel won her first WTA 125 title at the 2025 Abierto Tampico, defeating Cadence Brace in the final.

She made her WTA Tour main-draw debut at the 2026 Copa Colsanitas, recording a win over fellow Belgian Sofia Costoulas, before retiring due to a neck injury after losing the first set against top seed Marie Bouzková in the second round.

Vandewinkel made her major main-draw debut at the 2026 French Open, where she lost to 19th seed Madison Keys in the first round. The following month, she made her first main-draw appearance at Wimbledon, losing to qualifier Claire Liu in the first round.

=== National representation ===
In April 2024, Vandewinkel made her Billie Jean King Cup debut representing Belgium in the qualifiers against the United States, but lost to both Emma Navarro and Jessica Pegula.

When Belgium and the United States met in the BJK Cup qualifier again in April 2026, Vandewinkel defeated world No. 16, Iva Jovic, in the opening singles match.

== Performance timeline ==
Key
W	F	SF	QF	#R	RR	Q#	DNQ	A	NH

(W) winner; (F) finalist; (SF) semifinalist; (QF) quarterfinalist; (#R) rounds 4, 3, 2, 1; (RR) round-robin stage; (Q#) qualification round; (DNQ) did not qualify; (A) absent; (NH) not held; (SR) strike rate (events won / competed); (W–L) win–loss record.
To avoid confusion and double counting, these charts are updated at the conclusion of a tournament or when the player's participation has ended.

=== Singles ===
Current through the 2026 French Open.

Tournament	2025	2026	SR	W–L	Win %
Grand Slam tournaments
Australian Open	Q1	Q1	0 / 0	0–0	
French Open	Q1	1R	0 / 1	0–1	
Wimbledon	Q1	1R	0 / 1	0–1	
US Open	Q3	1R	0 / 1	0–1	
Win–loss	0–0	0–3	0 / 3	0–3	
WTA 1000 tournaments
Indian Wells Open	Q1	A	0 / 0	0–0	
Madrid Open	A	Q2	0 / 0	0–0	
Italian Open	A	Q1	0 / 0	0–0	
Cincinnati Open	A	1R	0 / 1	0–1	
Win–loss	0–0	0–1	0 / 1	0–1	

== WTA 125 finals ==
=== Singles: 2 (1 title, 1 runner-up) ===
Result	W–L	Date	Tournament	Surface	Opponent	Score
Win	1–0	Oct 2025	Abierto Tampico, Mexico	Hard	(Canada) Cadence Brace	6–4, 6–3
Loss	1–1	Jul 2026	ENKA Ladies Open, Turkey	Hard	(Thailand) Lanlana Tararudee	4–6, 6–4, 3–6

== ITF Circuit finals ==
=== Singles: 20 (13 titles, 7 runner-ups) ===
Legend W100 tournaments (2–0) W75 tournaments (2–1) W50 tournaments (2–1) W25/35 tournaments (3–4) W15 tournaments (4–1)	Finals by surface Hard (11–3) Clay (2–4)

Result	W–L	Date	Tournament	Tier	Surface	Opponent	Score
Loss	0–1	Aug 2022	ITF Duffel, Belgium	W15	Clay	(Belgium) Vicky Van de Peer	0–6, 3–6
Win	1–1	Oct 2022	ITF Monastir, Tunisia	W15	Hard	(Greece) Eleni Kordolaimi	6–3, 1–6, 6–1
Win	2–1	Nov 2022	ITF Monastir, Tunisia	W15	Hard	Anastasiia Gureva	6–2, 6–1
Win	3–1	Nov 2022	ITF Monastir, Tunisia	W15	Hard	(Chinese Taipei) Tsao Chia-yi	6–2, 7–5
Win	4–1	Feb 2023	ITF Manacor, Spain	W15	Hard	(Switzerland) Bojana Klincov	6–1, 6–0
Loss	4–2	Aug 2023	ITF Køge, Denmark	W25	Clay	(Croatia) Lucija Ćirić Bagarić	3–6, 5–7
Loss	4–3	Aug 2023	ITF Koksijde, Belgium	W25	Clay	(Serbia) Dejana Radanović	6–4, 6–7^{(4)}, 2–6
Win	5–3	Nov 2023	ITF Limassol, Cyprus	W25	Hard	(Belgium) Sofia Costoulas	6–2, 4–6, 6–4
Loss	5–4	Feb 2024	Pretoria International, South Africa	W50	Hard	(Brazil) Laura Pigossi	2–6, 6–4, 5–7
Loss	5–5	Mar 2024	ITF Terrassa, Spain	W35	Clay	(France) Loïs Boisson	0–6, 6–7^{(8)}
Win	6–5	Apr 2024	ITF Hammamet, Tunisia	W35	Clay	(Japan) Ikumi Yamazaki	6–1, 6–1
Win	7–5	Aug 2024	ITF Oldenzaal, Netherlands	W50	Clay	Polina Kudermetova	4–6, 6–2, 7–6^{(3)}
Win	8–5	Nov 2024	ITF Lousada, Portugal	W35	Hard (i)	(Switzerland) Susan Bandecchi	6–4, 6–2
Loss	8–6	Dec 2024	ITF Sharm El Sheikh, Egypt	W35	Hard	(Chinese Taipei) Joanna Garland	4–6, 2–6
Win	9–6	Jan 2025	ITF La Marsa, Tunisia	W50	Hard	(Poland) Linda Klimovičová	6–4, 6–1
Win	10–6	Feb 2026	ITF Pune, India	W75	Hard	Tatiana Prozorova	7–6^{(0)}, 7–6^{(5)}
Win	11–6	Feb 2026	ITF Bengaluru Open, India	W100	Hard	(India) Vaishnavi Adkar	6–0, 6–1
Win	12–6	Mar 2026	Trnava Indoor, Slovakia	W75	Hard (i)	(Ukraine) Daria Snigur	7–6^{(1)}, 6–1
Loss	12–7	Mar 2026	Branik Maribor Open, Slovenia	W75	Hard (i)	Tatiana Prozorova	3–6, 3–6
Win	13–7	Aug 2026	Landisville Tennis Challenge, US	W100	Hard	Anastasia Zakharova	3–6, 6–3, 6–1

=== Doubles: 9 (3 titles, 6 runner-ups) ===
Legend W50 tournaments (0–1) W25/35 tournaments (1–3) W15 tournaments (2–2)	Finals by surface Hard (3–3) Clay (0–3)

Result	W–L	Date	Tournament	Tier	Surface	Partner	Opponent	Score
Win	1–0	Feb 2022	ITF Monastir, Tunisia	W15	Hard	(United States) Clervie Ngounoue	(Germany) Mara Guth (Germany) Mia Mack	6–1, 6–2
Loss	1–1	Aug 2022	ITF Koksijde, Belgium	W25	Clay	(Belgium) Amélie Van Impe	(Belgium) Magali Kempen (Belgium) Lara Salden	2–6, 2–6
Loss	1–2	Aug 2022	ITF Duffel, Belgium	W15	Clay	(Belgium) Amélie Van Impe	(Italy) Giulia Crescenzi; Anastasia Sukhotina	4–6, 6–3, [8–10]
Loss	1–3	Oct 2022	ITF Monastir, Tunisia	W15	Hard	(Slovakia) Radka Zelníčková	(Chinese Taipei) Lee Ya-hsin (Chinese Taipei) Tsao Chia-yi	2–6, 4–6
Win	2–3	Feb 2023	ITF Manacor, Spain	W15	Hard	(Germany) Joëlle Steur	(Spain) Yvonne Cavallé Reimers (Spain) Marta González Encinas	7–6^{(4)}, 6–2
Loss	2–4	Aug 2023	ITF Braunschweig, Germany	W25	Clay	(Belgium) Amélie Van Impe	(Germany) Tea Lukic (Germany) Joëlle Steur	4–6, 5–7
Win	3–4	Nov 2023	ITF Limassol, Cyprus	W25	Hard	(Czech Republic) Julie Štruplová	(Germany) Katharina Hobgarski (Spain) Guiomar Maristany	6–4, 6–4
Loss	3–5	Feb 2024	Pretoria International, South Africa	W50	Hard	(Belgium) Sofia Costoulas	(Israel) Lina Glushko (Czech Republic) Gabriela Knutson	6–7^{(5)}, 6–7^{(4)}
Loss	3–6	Nov 2024	ITF Lousada, Portugal	W35	Hard (i)	Polina Iatcenko	(Belarus) Yuliya Hatouka (Kazakhstan) Zhibek Kulambayeva	3–6, 6–1, [4–10]
