= Kristina Novak (tennis) =

Slovenian tennis player (born 2000)

- Country (sports): Slovenia
- Born: 3 August 2000 (age 26) Radovljica, Slovenia
- Plays: Right (two-handed backhand)
- Prize money: $50,060

Singles
- Career record: 102–112
- Highest ranking: No. 695 (19 January 2026)
- Current ranking: No. 740 (27 July 2026)

Doubles
- Career record: 83–67
- Career titles: 6 ITF
- Highest ranking: No. 175 (30 March 2026)
- Current ranking: No. 197 (27 July 2026)
- Last updated on: 1 August 2026.

Kristina Novak (born 3 August 2000) is a Slovenian tennis player.

Novak has a career-high singles ranking by the WTA of 695, reached on 19 January 2026, and a highest doubles ranking of 175, achieved on 30 March 2026.

At the end of 2018, she reached three doubles finals of ITF tournaments held in Italy, and won two of them.

In 2022, she competed in her first career singles final in Krško, Slovenia where she was defeated by Czech player Aneta Kučmová.

In July 2024, she became champion, partnering with Swedish player Lisa Zaar in Brežice, Slovenia.

April 2025, she won her first major tournament at the W75 Koper Open in Slovenia with her partner Ivana Šebestová from Czechia.

== WTA 125 finals ==
=== Doubles: 1 (runner-up) ===
Result	W–L	Date	Tournament	Surface	Partner	Opponents	Score
Loss	0–1	Oct 2025	Abierto Tampico, Mexico	Hard	(Poland) Weronika Falkowska	(Canada) Kayla Cross (United Kingdom) Amelia Rajecki	4–6, 3–6

== ITF Circuit finals ==
=== Singles: 2 (2 runner-ups) ===
Legend W15 tournaments	Finals by surface Clay (0–2)

Result	W–L	Date	Tournament	Tier	Surface	Opponent	Score
Loss	0–1	May 2022	ITF Krško, Slovenia	W15	Clay	(Czech Republic) Aneta Kučmová	5–7, 1–6
Loss	0–2	Jul 2026	ITF Las Palmas, Spain	W15	Clay	(Spain) Carmen Gallardo Guevara	7–5, 2–6, 3–6

=== Doubles: 15 (9 titles, 6 runner-ups) ===
Legend W100 tournaments W75 tournaments W50 tournaments W35 tournaments W15 tournaments	Finals by surface Hard (4–3) Clay (4–2) Carpet (1–1)

Result	W–L	Date	Tournament	Tier	Surface	Partner	Opponents	Score
Loss	0–1	Dec 2018	ITF Solarino, Italy	W15	Carpet	(Slovenia) Veronika Erjavec	(Argentina) Catalina Pella (Italy) Miriana Tona	5–7, 3–6
Win	1–1	Dec 2018	ITF Solarino, Italy	W15	Carpet	(Slovenia) Veronika Erjavec	(Guatemala) Melissa Morales (Guatemala) Kirsten-Andrea Weedon	6–3, 7–6^{(4)}
Win	2–1	Dec 2018	ITF Ortisei, Italy	W15	Hard (i)	(Slovenia) Veronika Erjavec	(Italy) Verena Hofer (Switzerland) Simona Waltert	6–4, 7–5
Win	3–1	Oct 2023	ITF Norman, United States	W15	Hard (i)	(Argentina) Lucía Peyre	(Slovakia) Romana Čisovská (United States) Emma Staker	6–3, 6–2
Win	4–1	Jul 2024	ITF Brežice, Slovenia	W15	Clay	(Sweden) Lisa Zaar	Victoria Borodulina (Czech Republic) Emma Slavíková	6–2, 6–2
Loss	4–2	Aug 2024	ITF Erwitte, Germany	W35	Clay	(Sweden) Lisa Zaar	(Germany) Fabienne Gettwart (Japan) Erika Sema	4–6, 4–6
Loss	4–3	Jan 2025	Porto Indoor, Portugal	W50+H	Hard (i)	(Croatia) Lucija Ćirić Bagarić	(Portugal) Francisca Jorge (Portugal) Matilde Jorge	3–6, 2–6
Win	5–3	Apr 2025	Koper Open, Slovenia	W75	Clay	(Czech Republic) Ivana Šebestová	Julia Avdeeva; Ekaterina Maklakova	7–5, 0–6, [10–6]
Win	6–3	May 2025	ITF Otočec, Slovenia	W50	Clay	(Czech Republic) Denisa Hindová	(United States) Carolyn Ansari (Japan) Mana Kawamura	6–3, 3–6, [10–8]
Loss	6–4	Jan 2026	Porto Indoor, Portugal	W75	Hard (i)	(Ukraine) Nadiia Kolb	(Portugal) Francisca Jorge (Portugal) Matilde Jorge	2–6, 4–6
Loss	6–5	Apr 2026	ITF Nottingham, United Kingdom	W35	Hard	(Czech Republic) Aneta Laboutková	(United Kingdom) Freya Christie (United Kingdom) Eden Silva	1–6, 0–6
Win	7–5	May 2026	ITF Nottingham, United Kingdom	W35	Hard	(United Kingdom) Freya Christie	(United Kingdom) Victoria Allen (United Kingdom) Amelia Rajecki	6–4, 6–2
Loss	7–6	Jul 2026	Schönbusch Open, Germany	W100	Clay	(Serbia) Elena Milovanović	(United States) Rasheeda McAdoo (Kenya) Angella Okutoyi	3–6, 3–6
Win	8–6	Sep 2026	ITF Viserba, Italy	W15	Clay	(Norway) Astrid Brune Olsen	(Czech Republic) Veronika Kulhavá (Italy) Federica Trevisan	4–6, 6–1, [10–4]
Win	9–6	Sep 2026	ITF Baza, Spain	W35	Hard	(Serbia) Elena Milovanović	(Finland) Laura Hietaranta (Slovakia) Radka Zelníčková	6–1, 6–0
