= 2024 Guanajuato Open =

Tennis tournament

- Date: 5–11 February 2024
- Edition: 16th
- Category: ITF Women's World Tennis Tour
- Prize money: $100,000
- Surface: Hard / Outdoor
- Location: Irapuato, Mexico

Champions

Singles
- (Canada) Rebecca Marino

Doubles
- (United States) Hailey Baptiste / (United States) Whitney Osuigwe
← 2023 ·	Guanajuato Open	· 2025 →

The 2024 Guanajuato Open was a professional tennis tournament played on outdoor hard courts. It was the sixteenth edition of the tournament which was part of the 2024 ITF Women's World Tennis Tour. It took place in Irapuato, Mexico between 5 and 11 February 2024.

== Champions ==
=== Singles ===
- (Canada) Rebecca Marino def. (Germany) Jule Niemeier 6–1, 6–2.

=== Doubles ===
- (United States) Hailey Baptiste / (United States) Whitney Osuigwe def. (United States) Ann Li / (Canada) Rebecca Marino 7–5, 6–4.

== Singles main draw entrants ==
=== Seeds ===
Country	Player	Rank^{1}	Seed
ARG	María Lourdes Carlé	110	1
USA	Hailey Baptiste	121	2
USA	Sachia Vickery	145	3
GER	Jule Niemeier	159	4
USA	Ann Li	164	5
CAN	Rebecca Marino	166	6
ARG	Solana Sierra	183	7
SRB	Natalija Stevanović	186	8

- ^{1} Rankings are as of 29 January 2024.

=== Other entrants ===
The following players received wildcards into the singles main draw:

- (Mexico) Fernanda Contreras
- (Mexico) Jessica Hinojosa Gómez
- (Mexico) Claudia Sofía Martínez Solís
- (Mexico) Ángeles Rodríguez-Rizo

The following player received entry using a special ranking:

- Marina Melnikova

The following players received entry from the qualifying draw:

- (Brazil) Carolina Alves
- (Germany) Anna Gabric
- (United States) Haley Giavara
- (United States) Victoria Hu
- (United States) Maegan Manasse
- (United States) Whitney Osuigwe
- (United States) Adriana Reami
- (Mexico) Victoria Rodríguez
