= 2025 Guanajuato Open – Singles =

Singles
- 2025 Guanajuato Open

Final
- Champion: (Canada) Marina Stakusic
- Runner-up: (United States) Elvina Kalieva
- Score: 6–2, 6–2

Events
Singles	Doubles
← 2024 ·	Guanajuato Open	· 2026 →

Rebecca Marino was the defending champion, but chose not to participate.

Marina Stakusic won the title, defeating Elvina Kalieva in the final, 6–2, 6–2.

== Seeds ==
1. (Netherlands) Arantxa Rus (quarterfinals)
2. (Belgium) Hanne Vandewinkel (semifinals)
3. (Canada) Marina Stakusic (champion)
4. (Mexico) Ana Sofía Sánchez (second round)
5. (United States) Elizabeth Mandlik (semifinals)
6. (Romania) Miriam Bulgaru (second round)
7. (United States) Elvina Kalieva (final)
8. (Bulgaria) Lia Karatancheva (quarterfinals)

== Draw ==
Key

- Q = Qualifier
- WC = Wild card
- LL = Lucky loser
- Alt = Alternate
- ITF = ITF entry
- PR = Protected ranking
- SR = Special ranking
- SE = Special exempt
- JE = Junior exempt
- JR = Junior Accelerator Programme entrant
- CO = College Accelerator Programme entrant
- NG = Next Gen Accelerator Program entrant
- w/o = Walkover
- r = Retired
- d = Defaulted

=== Finals ===
Semifinals
7	(United States) Elvina Kalieva	7	6
5	(United States) Elizabeth Mandlik	5	1
3	(Canada) Marina Stakusic	7^{7}	6
2	(Belgium) Hanne Vandewinkel	6^{3}	3

Final
7	(United States) Elvina Kalieva	2	2
3	(Canada) Marina Stakusic	6	6

=== Top half ===
First round
1	(Netherlands) A Rus	6	6
Q	(United States) M Iyengar	4	2
(Peru) L Pérez Alarcón	6	6
WC	(Mexico) Á Rodríguez-Rizo	0	0
E Nepliy	6^{2}	3
(Mexico) V Rodríguez	7^{7}	6
Q	(United States) S Llewellyn	6	3	2
7	(United States) E Kalieva	3	6	6
4	(Mexico) AS Sánchez	6	6
(Netherlands) L Tran	1	3
(Italy) D Cherubini	6	6
Q	(The Bahamas) S Pratt	1	0
(United States) S Vickery	6	7^{7}
Q	(Slovenia) K Novak	1	6^{1}
M Kozyreva	6	6^{1}	3
5	(United States) E Mandlik	3	7^{7}	6

Second round
1	(Netherlands) A Rus	6	3	6
(Peru) L Pérez Alarcón	2	6	2
(Mexico) V Rodríguez	2	1
7	(United States) E Kalieva	6	6
4	(Mexico) AS Sánchez	5	3
(Italy) D Cherubini	7	6
(United States) S Vickery	1	2
5	(United States) E Mandlik	6	6

Quarterfinals
1	(Netherlands) A Rus	6	4	1
7	(United States) E Kalieva	0	6	6
(Italy) D Cherubini	4	5
5	(United States) E Mandlik	6	7

Semifinals
7	(United States) E Kalieva	7	6
5	(United States) E Mandlik	5	1

=== Bottom half ===
First round
8	(Bulgaria) L Karatancheva	4	6	3
(Japan) Y Naito	6	3	1^{r}
Q	(Mexico) M Castillo Meza	2	2
Q	(United States) D Hewitt	6	6
Q	(Mexico) J Hinojosa Gómez	6	6
WC	(Mexico) A Cardenas Olivares	4	0
(United States) A Smith	4	0
3	(Canada) M Stakusic	6	6
6	(Romania) M Bulgaru	7^{7}	6
WC	(Mexico) CS Martínez Solís	6^{4}	3
(United States) UM Arconada	6	6
Q	(China) L Mi	2	2
(Japan) E Koike	6	6
WC	(Mexico) M Ángel	2	1
(United States) V Hu	0	2
2	(Belgium) H Vandewinkel	6	6

Second round
8	(Bulgaria) L Karatancheva	4	6	6
Q	(United States) D Hewitt	6	3	4
Q	(Mexico) J Hinojosa Gómez	2	0
3	(Canada) M Stakusic	6	6
6	(Romania) M Bulgaru	3	5
(United States) UM Arconada	6	7
(Japan) E Koike	4	3
2	(Belgium) H Vandewinkel	6	6

Quarterfinals
8	(Bulgaria) L Karatancheva	0	3
3	(Canada) M Stakusic	6	6
(United States) UM Arconada	7	3	1
2	(Belgium) H Vandewinkel	5	6	6

Semifinals
3	(Canada) M Stakusic	7^{7}	6
2	(Belgium) H Vandewinkel	6^{3}	3
