= 2022 Guanajuato Open =

Tennis tournament

- Date: 7–13 March 2022
- Edition: 14th
- Category: ITF Women's World Tennis Tour
- Prize money: $60,000+H
- Surface: Hard / Outdoor
- Location: Irapuato, Mexico

Champions

Singles
- (China) Zhu Lin

Doubles
- (United States) Kaitlyn Christian / Lidziya Marozava
← 2019 ·	Guanajuato Open	· 2023 →

The 2022 Guanajuato Open was a professional tennis tournament played on outdoor hard courts. It was the fourteenth edition of the tournament which was part of the 2022 ITF Women's World Tennis Tour. It took place in Irapuato, Mexico between 7 and 13 March 2022.

== Singles main draw entrants ==
=== Seeds ===
Country	Player	Rank^{1}	Seed
CHN	Zhu Lin	119	1
CAN	Rebecca Marino	142	2
	~~Anastasia Gasanova~~	~~155~~	~~3~~
NED	Arianne Hartono	164	4
USA	Robin Anderson	172	5
~~SWE~~	~~Mirjam Björklund~~	~~186~~	~~6~~
GRE	Valentini Grammatikopoulou	189	7
USA	Jamie Loeb	194	8

- ^{1} Rankings are as of 28 February 2022.

=== Other entrants ===
The following players received wildcards into the singles main draw:

- (Italy) Gala Arangio
- (Mexico) Claudia Sofía Martínez Solís

The following player received entry as a special exempt:

- (United States) Adriana Reami

The following players received entry from the qualifying draw:

- (United States) Kaitlyn Christian
- (United States) Ellie Douglas
- (United States) Dalayna Hewitt
- (Mexico) Jessica Hinojosa Gómez
- (United States) Zoe Hitt
- (Mexico) Ana Paula Martínez Mora
- (Mexico) María Fernanda Navarro
- (United States) Erica Oosterhout

The following players received entry as lucky losers:

- (Colombia) Ana María Becerra
- (United States) Sylvia Schenck

== Champions ==
=== Singles ===
- (China) Zhu Lin def. (Canada) Rebecca Marino, 6–4, 6–1

=== Doubles ===
- (United States) Kaitlyn Christian / Lidziya Marozava def. Anastasia Tikhonova / (Latvia) Daniela Vismane, 6–0, 6–2
