= 2024 Guanajuato Open – Doubles =

Doubles
- 2024 Guanajuato Open

Final
- Champions: (United States) Hailey Baptiste (United States) Whitney Osuigwe
- Runners-up: (United States) Ann Li (Canada) Rebecca Marino
- Score: 7–5, 6–4

Events
Singles	Doubles
← 2023 ·	Guanajuato Open	· 2025 →

Emina Bektas and Ingrid Neel were the defending champions but chose not to participate.

Hailey Baptiste and Whitney Osuigwe won the title, defeating Ann Li and Rebecca Marino in the final, 7–5, 6–4.

== Seeds ==
1. (United States) Angela Kulikov / Iryna Shymanovich (first round)
2. (Colombia) María Paulina Pérez / (United States) Sofia Sewing (first round)
3. (United States) Hailey Baptiste / (United States) Whitney Osuigwe (champions)
4. (Serbia) Natalija Stevanović / (Ukraine) Valeriya Strakhova (quarterfinals)

== Draw ==
=== Key ===
- Q = Qualifier
- WC = Wild card
- LL = Lucky loser
- Alt = Alternate
- SE = Special exempt
- PR = Protected ranking
- ITF = ITF entry
- JE = Junior exempt
- w/o = Walkover
- r = Retired
- d = Defaulted
- SR = Special ranking

First round
1	(United States) A Kulikov; I Shymanovich	5	6	[4]
WC	(Mexico) V Rodríguez (Mexico) AS Sánchez	7	2	[10]
(United States) D Hewitt (United States) V Hu	6	3	[10]
(Brazil) C Alves (Argentina) S Sierra	4	6	[8]
3	(United States) H Baptiste (United States) W Osuigwe	6	6
WC	(Mexico) CS Martínez Solís (United States) A Reami	3	1
(United States) C Corley (United States) I Corley	4	3
(Spain) I Burillo Escorihuela (United States) R McAdoo	6	6
(United States) A Li (Canada) R Marino	6	6
(Colombia) M Herazo González; V Miroshnichenko	2	3
(United States) H Chang (United States) S Vickery	5	6	[7]
4	(Serbia) N Stevanović (Ukraine) V Strakhova	7	1	[10]
M Melnikova (Netherlands) L Pattinama Kerkhove	6	6
WC	(Mexico) N Castañeda Guerrero (Mexico) Á Rodríguez-Rizo	2	3
(Mexico) F Contreras (United States) E Kalieva	6	6
2	(Colombia) MP Pérez (United States) S Sewing	4	1

Quarterfinals
WC	(Mexico) V Rodríguez (Mexico) AS Sánchez	4	2
(United States) D Hewitt (United States) V Hu	6	6
3	(United States) H Baptiste (United States) W Osuigwe	6	6
(Spain) I Burillo Escorihuela (United States) R McAdoo	1	4
(United States) A Li (Canada) R Marino	6	6
4	(Serbia) N Stevanović (Ukraine) V Strakhova	3	4
M Melnikova (Netherlands) L Pattinama Kerkhove	4	6	[13]
(Mexico) F Contreras (United States) E Kalieva	6	3	[11]

Semifinals
(United States) D Hewitt (United States) V Hu	2	5
3	(United States) H Baptiste (United States) W Osuigwe	6	7
(United States) A Li (Canada) R Marino	6	6
M Melnikova (Netherlands) L Pattinama Kerkhove	1	1

Final
3	(United States) H Baptiste (United States) W Osuigwe	7	6
(United States) A Li (Canada) R Marino	5	4
