= 2024 Guanajuato Open – Singles =

Singles
- 2024 Guanajuato Open

Final
- Champion: (Canada) Rebecca Marino
- Runner-up: (Germany) Jule Niemeier
- Score: 6–1, 6–2

Events
Singles	Doubles
← 2023 ·	Guanajuato Open	· 2025 →

Rebecca Marino won the title, defeating Jule Niemeier in the final, 6–1, 6–2.

Kamilla Rakhimova was the defending champion, but chose to compete in the qualifying competition at the Qatar Open.

== Seeds ==
1. (Argentina) María Lourdes Carlé (quarterfinals)
2. (United States) Hailey Baptiste (first round)
3. (United States) Sachia Vickery (semifinals)
4. (Germany) Jule Niemeier (final)
5. (United States) Ann Li (first round)
6. (Canada) Rebecca Marino (champion)
7. (Argentina) Solana Sierra (second round)
8. (Serbia) Natalija Stevanović (first round)

== Draw ==
=== Key ===
- Q = Qualifier
- WC = Wild card
- LL = Lucky loser
- Alt = Alternate
- SE = Special exempt
- PR = Protected ranking
- ITF = ITF entry
- JE = Junior exempt
- w/o = Walkover
- r = Retired
- d = Defaulted
- SR = Special ranking

=== Finals ===
Semifinals
Q	(United States) Whitney Osuigwe	4	7	6^{2}
4	(Germany) Jule Niemeier	6	5	7^{7}
3	(United States) Sachia Vickery	4	2
6	(Canada) Rebecca Marino	6	6

Final
4	(Germany) Jule Niemeier	1	2
6	(Canada) Rebecca Marino	6	6

=== Top half ===
First round
1	(Argentina) ML Carlé	7	7
(Ukraine) V Strakhova	5	5
Q	(United States) V Hu	3	1
Q	(Brazil) C Alves	6	6
Q	(United States) W Osuigwe	7^{7}	6
(Mexico) AS Sánchez	6^{1}	4
Q	(United States) A Reami	6	6
5	(United States) A Li	2	1
4	(Germany) J Niemeier	6	2	6
WC	(Mexico) CS Martínez Solís	1	6	0
(United States) H Chang	6	6
WC	(Mexico) Á Rodríguez-Rizo	1	2
(Canada) C Zhao	3	6	6
(United States) E Kalieva	6	3	2
Q	(United States) H Giavara	4	2
7	(Argentina) S Sierra	6	6

Second round
1	(Argentina) ML Carlé	6	6
Q	(Brazil) C Alves	4	2
Q	(United States) W Osuigwe	6	6
Q	(United States) A Reami	2	3
4	(Germany) J Niemeier	6	6
(United States) H Chang	2	2
(Canada) C Zhao	6	6
7	(Argentina) S Sierra	2	3

Quarterfinals
1	(Argentina) ML Carlé	3	6	1
Q	(United States) W Osuigwe	6	4	6
4	(Germany) J Niemeier	7^{8}	6^{4}	6
(Canada) C Zhao	6^{6}	7^{7}	2

Semifinals
Q	(United States) W Osuigwe	4	7	6^{2}
4	(Germany) J Niemeier	6	5	7^{7}

=== Bottom half ===
First round
8	(Serbia) N Stevanović	1	2
J Kolodynska	6	6
SR	M Melnikova	6^{8}	7^{7}	6
Q	(Germany) A Gabric	7^{10}	6^{5}	2
Q	(Mexico) V Rodríguez	3	2
(Netherlands) L Pattinama Kerkhove	6	6
(Canada) S Fung	5	3
3	(United States) S Vickery	7	6
6	(Canada) R Marino	6	6
Q	(United States) M Manasse	1	4
WC	(Mexico) F Contreras	7^{7}	6
(Spain) I Burillo Escorihuela	6^{3}	3
WC	(Mexico) J Hinojosa Gómez	6	1	0
(United States) V Lepchenko	4	6	6
I Shymanovich	6	6
2	(United States) H Baptiste	4	3

Second round
J Kolodynska	5	6^{5}
SR	M Melnikova	7	7^{7}
(Netherlands) L Pattinama Kerkhove	5	5
3	(United States) S Vickery	7	7
6	(Canada) R Marino	6	6
WC	(Mexico) F Contreras	2	3
(United States) V Lepchenko	6^{2}	6^{4}
I Shymanovich	7^{7}	7^{7}

Quarterfinals
SR	M Melnikova	2	1
3	(United States) S Vickery	6	6
6	(Canada) R Marino	5	6	6
I Shymanovich	7	1	4

Semifinals
3	(United States) S Vickery	4	2
6	(Canada) R Marino	6	6
