= 2025 Guanajuato Open – Doubles =

Doubles
- 2025 Guanajuato Open

Final
- Champions: (United States) Dalayna Hewitt (United States) Victoria Hu
- Runners-up: (Mexico) Victoria Rodríguez (Mexico) Ana Sofía Sánchez
- Score: 6–4, 6–4

Events
Singles	Doubles
← 2024 ·	Guanajuato Open	· 2026 →

Hailey Baptiste and Whitney Osuigwe were the defending champions but chose not to participate.

Dalayna Hewitt and Victoria Hu won the title, defeating Victoria Rodríguez and Ana Sofía Sánchez in the final; 6–4, 6–4.

== Seeds ==
1. Maria Kozyreva / (United States) Alana Smith (quarterfinals)
2. (Slovenia) Kristina Novak / (Australia) Alexandra Osborne (semifinals)
3. (Mexico) Victoria Rodríguez / (Mexico) Ana Sofía Sánchez (final)
4. (Netherlands) Lian Tran / (Bosnia and Herzegovina) Anita Wagner (semifinals)

== Draw ==
Key

- Q = Qualifier
- WC = Wild card
- LL = Lucky loser
- Alt = Alternate
- ITF = ITF entry
- PR = Protected ranking
- SR = Special ranking
- SE = Special exempt
- JE = Junior exempt
- JR = Junior Accelerator Programme entrant
- CO = College Accelerator Programme entrant
- NG = Next Gen Accelerator Program entrant
- w/o = Walkover
- r = Retired
- d = Defaulted

=== Draw ===
First round
1	M Kozyreva (United States) A Smith	6	6
(Colombia) M Herazo (Mexico) S León	1	2
(United States) D Hewitt (United States) V Hu	6	7
(Canada) A Comiskey (United States) S Llewellyn	1	5
4	(Netherlands) L Tran (Bosnia and Herzegovina) A Wagner	4	6	[10]
(United States) AC Lutkemeyer Obregon (Peru) L Pérez Alarcón	6	3	[5]
(Netherlands) A Rus (Canada) M Stakusic	6	6
(China) L Mi (Mexico) Á Rodríguez-Rizo	2	0
(Mexico) M Castillo Meza (Mexico) AC Nava Elkin	2	6	[10]
(Bulgaria) L Karatancheva (United States) G Vilar	6	3	[12]
(United States) S Vickery (India) S Vig	1	3
3	(Mexico) V Rodríguez (Mexico) AS Sánchez	6	6
(Mexico) J Hinojosa Gómez; E Nepliy	4	6	[4]
(South Africa) Wa Mdlulwa (South Africa) Wo Mdlulwa	6	1	[10]
(Mexico) CS Martínez Solís (Mexico) IC Millan Acosta	3	3
2	(Slovenia) K Novak (Australia) A Osborne	6	6

Quarterfinals
1	M Kozyreva (United States) A Smith	6	3	[7]
(United States) D Hewitt (United States) V Hu	3	6	[10]
4	(Netherlands) L Tran (Bosnia and Herzegovina) A Wagner	6	3	[10]
(Netherlands) A Rus (Canada) M Stakusic	2	6	[7]
(Bulgaria) L Karatancheva (United States) G Vilar	3	6	[5]
3	(Mexico) V Rodríguez (Mexico) AS Sánchez	6	3	[10]
(South Africa) Wa Mdlulwa (South Africa) Wo Mdlulwa	3	4
2	(Slovenia) K Novak (Australia) A Osborne	6	6

Semifinals
(United States) D Hewitt (United States) V Hu	6	6
4	(Netherlands) L Tran (Bosnia and Herzegovina) A Wagner	4	3
3	(Mexico) V Rodríguez (Mexico) AS Sánchez	4	7	[10]
2	(Slovenia) K Novak (Australia) A Osborne	6	5	[7]

Final
(United States) D Hewitt (United States) V Hu	6	6
3	(Mexico) V Rodríguez (Mexico) AS Sánchez	4	4
