= 2022 Guanajuato Open – Doubles =

Doubles
- 2022 Guanajuato Open

Final
- Champions: (United States) Kaitlyn Christian; Lidziya Marozava
- Runners-up: Anastasia Tikhonova (Latvia) Daniela Vismane
- Score: 6–0, 6–2

Events
Singles	Doubles
← 2019 ·	Guanajuato Open	· 2023 →

Paige Hourigan and Astra Sharma were the defending champions having won the previous edition in 2019, however both players chose not to participate.

Kaitlyn Christian and Lidziya Marozava won the title, defeating Anastasia Tikhonova and Daniela Vismane in the final, 6–0, 6–2.

== Seeds ==
1. (United States) Kaitlyn Christian / Lidziya Marozava (champions)
2. (Greece) Valentini Grammatikopoulou / Yana Sizikova (semifinals)
3. (Thailand) Peangtarn Plipuech / (Indonesia) Aldila Sutjiadi (first round)
4. (Brazil) Carolina Alves / (United States) Robin Anderson (quarterfinals)

== Draw ==
=== Key ===
- Q = Qualifier
- WC = Wild card
- LL = Lucky loser
- Alt = Alternate
- SE = Special exempt
- PR = Protected ranking
- ITF = ITF entry
- JE = Junior exempt
- w/o = Walkover
- r = Retired
- d = Defaulted
- SR = Special ranking

=== Draw ===
First round
(United States) Z Hitt (United States) S Schenck	0	4
(China) X Han (China) L Zhu	6	6
3	(Thailand) P Plipuech (Indonesia) A Sutjiadi	1	2
(Mexico) F Contreras (Netherlands) A Hartono	6	6
(United States) F Di Lorenzo (United States) J Loeb	6	2	[6]
(Israel) L Glushko (Canada) R Marino	4	6	[10]
A Tikhonova (Latvia) D Vismane	6	1	[12]
(United States) Q Gleason (Mexico) M Zacarías	1	6	[10]
(United States) D Hewitt (United States) W Osuigwe	4	3
4	(Brazil) C Alves (United States) R Anderson	6	6
(Italy) G Arangio (Mexico) CS Martínez Solís	1	5
(Mexico) J Hinojosa Gómez (Mexico) N Urbina	6	7
(Colombia) AM Becerra (Mexico) X Negrete Hernández	2	0
2	(Greece) V Grammatikopoulou; Y Sizikova	6	6

Quarterfinals
1	(United States) K Christian; L Marozava	6	7^{7}
(China) X Han (China) L Zhu	4	6^{4}
(Mexico) F Contreras (Netherlands) A Hartono	6	6
(Israel) L Glushko (Canada) R Marino	2	2
A Tikhonova (Latvia) D Vismane	7	5	[10]
4	(Brazil) C Alves (United States) R Anderson	5	7	[8]
(Mexico) J Hinojosa Gómez (Mexico) N Urbina	4	3
2	(Greece) V Grammatikopoulou; Y Sizikova	6	6

Semifinals
1	(United States) K Christian; L Marozava	6	6
(Mexico) F Contreras (Netherlands) A Hartono	3	2
A Tikhonova (Latvia) D Vismane	3	6	[10]
2	(Greece) V Grammatikopoulou; Y Sizikova	6	3	[8]

Final
1	(United States) K Christian; L Marozava	6	6
A Tikhonova (Latvia) D Vismane	0	2
