= 2023 Guanajuato Open =

Tennis tournament

- Date: 13–19 February 2023
- Edition: 15th
- Category: ITF Women's World Tennis Tour
- Prize money: $60,000+H
- Surface: Hard / Outdoor
- Location: Irapuato, Mexico

Champions

Singles
- Kamilla Rakhimova

Doubles
- (United States) Emina Bektas / (United States) Ingrid Neel
← 2022 ·	Guanajuato Open	· 2024 →

The 2023 Guanajuato Open was a professional tennis tournament played on outdoor hard courts. It was the fifteenth edition of the tournament, which was part of the 2023 ITF Women's World Tennis Tour. It took place in Irapuato, Mexico, between 13 and 19 February 2023.

== Champions ==
=== Singles ===
- Kamilla Rakhimova def. (Cyprus) Raluca Șerban, 6–0, 1–6, 6–2

=== Doubles ===
- (United States) Emina Bektas / (United States) Ingrid Neel def. (United States) Quinn Gleason / (France) Elixane Lechemia, 7–6^{(7–4)}, 3–6, [10–6]

== Singles main draw entrants ==
=== Seeds ===
Country	Player	Rank	Seed
CHN	Wang Xinyu	69	1
GER	Tatjana Maria	70	2
ARG	Nadia Podoroska	114	3
	Kamilla Rakhimova	115	4
USA	Emma Navarro	135	5
JPN	Nao Hibino	139	6
~~SWE~~	~~Rebecca Peterson~~	~~145~~	~~7~~
ESP	Aliona Bolsova	146	8

- Rankings are as of 6 February 2023.

=== Other entrants ===
The following players received wildcards into the singles main draw:

- (Mexico) Jessica Hinojosa Gómez
- (Mexico) María Portillo Ramírez
- (Mexico) Ana Sofía Sánchez
- (Mexico) Renata Zarazúa

The following players received entry from the qualifying draw:

- (United States) Emina Bektas
- (Romania) Miriam Bulgaru
- (Brazil) Gabriela Cé
- (Poland) Weronika Falkowska
- (Israel) Lina Glushko
- (United States) Jamie Loeb
- (Lithuania) Justina Mikulskytė
- (United States) Taylor Ng

The following player received entry as a lucky loser:

- (Australia) Olivia Tjandramulia
