= 2022 Guanajuato Open – Singles =

Singles
- 2022 Guanajuato Open

Final
- Champion: (China) Zhu Lin
- Runner-up: (Canada) Rebecca Marino
- Score: 6–4, 6–1

Events
Singles	Doubles
← 2019 ·	Guanajuato Open	· 2023 →

Zhu Lin won the title, defeating Rebecca Marino in the final, 6–4, 6–1.

Astra Sharma was the defending champion having won the event when it was last held in 2019, but chose to participate at the BNP Paribas Open, where she reached the second round as a lucky loser.

== Seeds ==
1. (China) Zhu Lin (champion)
2. (Canada) Rebecca Marino (final)
3. Anastasia Gasanova (withdrew)
4. (Netherlands) Arianne Hartono (second round)
5. (United States) Robin Anderson (second round)
6. (Sweden) Mirjam Björklund (withdrew)
7. (Greece) Valentini Grammatikopoulou (second round)
8. (United States) Jamie Loeb (quarterfinals)

== Draw ==
=== Key ===
- Q = Qualifier
- WC = Wild card
- LL = Lucky loser
- Alt = Alternate
- SE = Special exempt
- PR = Protected ranking
- ITF = ITF entry
- JE = Junior exempt
- w/o = Walkover
- r = Retired
- d = Defaulted
- SR = Special ranking

=== Finals ===
Semifinals
1	(China) Zhu Lin	6	6
Anastasia Tikhonova	2	0
(Brazil) Carolina Alves	5	1
2	(Canada) Rebecca Marino	7	6

Final
1	(China) Zhu Lin	6	6
2	(Canada) Rebecca Marino	4	1

=== Top half ===
First round
1	(China) L Zhu	6	6
Q	(Mexico) AP Martínez Mora	0	0
(Latvia) D Vismane	4	1
(United States) Q Gleason	6	6
Q	(United States) E Oosterhout	3	6^{5}
(Ukraine) K Volodko	6	7^{7}
(Israel) L Glushko	3	3
8	(United States) J Loeb	6	6
LL	(Colombia) AM Becerra	6	6^{1}	6^{3}
WC	(Italy) G Arangio	4	7^{7}	7^{7}
A Tikhonova	7^{7}	1	6
(Mexico) F Contreras	6^{4}	6	2
Q	(United States) D Hewitt	2	7^{7}	6
(Mexico) M Zacarías	6	6^{4}	4
(United States) F Di Lorenzo	6	6
LL	(United States) S Schenck	0	0

Second round
1	(China) L Zhu	6	6
(United States) Q Gleason	1	4
(Ukraine) K Volodko	4	7^{7}	4
8	(United States) J Loeb	6	6^{4}	6
WC	(Italy) G Arangio	1	1
A Tikhonova	6	6
Q	(United States) D Hewitt	6	4	6
(United States) F Di Lorenzo	3	6	4

Quarterfinals
1	(China) L Zhu	6^{5}	6	6
8	(United States) J Loeb	7^{7}	2	3
A Tikhonova	6	6
Q	(United States) D Hewitt	2	3

Semifinals
1	(China) L Zhu	6	6
A Tikhonova	2	0

=== Bottom half ===
First round
5	(United States) R Anderson	6	3	6
(Indonesia) A Sutjiadi	4	6	2
Q	(United States) Z Hitt	2	0
(Brazil) C Alves	6	6
Q	(United States) E Douglas	7^{7}	6
Q	(United States) K Christian	6^{2}	2
WC	(Mexico) CS Martínez Solís	0	1
4	(Netherlands) A Hartono	6	6
7	(Greece) V Grammatikopoulou	6	2	6
(Thailand) P Plipuech	2	6	1
Q	(Mexico) MF Navarro	4	2
(Australia) S Mendez	6	6
(United States) W Osuigwe	7^{8}	6
Q	(Mexico) J Hinojosa Gómez	6^{6}	3
SE	(United States) A Reami	3	3
2	(Canada) R Marino	6	6

Second round
5	(United States) R Anderson	4	2
(Brazil) C Alves	6	6
Q	(United States) E Douglas	7	5	6
4	(Netherlands) A Hartono	5	7	0
7	(Greece) V Grammatikopoulou	2	1
(Australia) S Mendez	6	6
(United States) W Osuigwe	1	2
2	(Canada) R Marino	6	6

Quarterfinals
(Brazil) C Alves	4	7^{7}	6
Q	(United States) E Douglas	6	6^{5}	1
(Australia) S Mendez	5	1
2	(Canada) R Marino	7	6

Semifinals
(Brazil) C Alves	5	1
2	(Canada) R Marino	7	6
