= 2023 Guanajuato Open – Singles =

Singles
- 2023 Guanajuato Open

Final
- Champion: Kamilla Rakhimova
- Runner-up: (Cyprus) Raluca Șerban
- Score: 6–0, 1–6, 6–2

Events
Singles	Doubles
← 2022 ·	Guanajuato Open	· 2024 →

Kamilla Rakhimova won the title, defeating Raluca Șerban in the final, 6–0, 1–6, 6–2.

Zhu Lin was the defending champion, but chose not to participate.

== Seeds ==
1. (China) Wang Xinyu (semifinals)
2. (Germany) Tatjana Maria (second round)
3. (Argentina) Nadia Podoroska (quarterfinals)
4. Kamilla Rakhimova (champion)
5. (United States) Emma Navarro (first round)
6. (Japan) Nao Hibino (first round)
7. (Sweden) Rebecca Peterson (withdrew)
8. (Spain) Aliona Bolsova (first round)

== Draw ==
=== Key ===
- Q = Qualifier
- WC = Wild card
- LL = Lucky loser
- Alt = Alternate
- SE = Special exempt
- PR = Protected ranking
- ITF = ITF entry
- JE = Junior exempt
- w/o = Walkover
- r = Retired
- d = Defaulted
- SR = Special ranking

=== Finals ===
Semifinals
(Mexico) Marcela Zacarías	6^{5}	6^{5}
4	Kamilla Rakhimova	7^{7}	7^{7}
(Cyprus) Raluca Șerban	7	7^{7}
(United States) Ashlyn Krueger	5	6^{0}

Final
4	Kamilla Rakhimova	6	1	6
(Cyprus) Raluca Șerban	0	6	2

=== Top half ===
First round
1	(China) Xin Wang	6	2	6
E Avanesyan	2	6	4
WC	(Mexico) AS Sánchez	3	4
(Greece) D Papamichail	6	6
(Netherlands) S Lamens	6^{7}	2
Q	(Lithuania) J Mikulskytė	7^{9}	6
(Mexico) M Zacarías	7	7
LL	(Australia) O Tjandramulia	5	5
4	K Rakhimova	7^{8}	7^{9}
WC	(Mexico) M Portillo Ramírez	6^{6}	6^{7}
(Mexico) F Contreras	6^{2}	6	5
(Canada) C Zhao	7^{7}	4	7
(Australia) A Sharma	7	6
WC	(Mexico) J Hinojosa Gómez	5	4
Q	(United States) T Ng	6	7^{11}
6	(Japan) N Hibino	3	6^{9}

Second round
1	(China) Xin Wang	4	6	7^{8}
(Greece) D Papamichail	6	4	6^{6}
Q	(Lithuania) J Mikulskytė	4	0
(Mexico) M Zacarías	6	6
4	K Rakhimova	7	7^{7}
(Canada) C Zhao	5	6^{3}
(Australia) A Sharma	3	6	6
Q	(United States) T Ng	6	1	2

Quarterfinals
1	(China) Xin Wang	4	6^{7}
(Mexico) M Zacarías	6	7^{9}
4	K Rakhimova	6	6
(Australia) A Sharma	1	2

Semifinals
(Mexico) M Zacarías	6^{5}	6^{5}
4	K Rakhimova	7^{7}	7^{7}

=== Bottom half ===
First round
5	(United States) E Navarro	5	6^{2}
(Cyprus) R Șerban	7	7^{7}
Q	(Brazil) G Cé	7	0	6
Q	(Poland) W Falkowska	5	6	2
Q	(United States) J Loeb	3	3
(United States) K Day	6	6
WC	(Mexico) R Zarazúa	6^{4}	6^{4}
3	(Argentina) N Podoroska	7^{7}	7^{7}
8	(Spain) A Bolsova	5	6	3
(United States) A Krueger	7	4	6
Q	(Israel) L Glushko	6	6
Q	(Romania) M Bulgaru	2	4
(Australia) K Birrell	4	6	6
(Switzerland) J Züger	6	1	3
Q	(United States) E Bektas	3	5
2	(Germany) T Maria	6	7

Second round
(Cyprus) R Șerban	7^{7}	6
Q	(Brazil) G Cé	6^{1}	3
(United States) K Day	5	2
3	(Argentina) N Podoroska	7	6
(United States) A Krueger	6	6
Q	(Israel) L Glushko	3	4
(Australia) K Birrell	6	7^{7}
2	(Germany) T Maria	2	6^{2}

Quarterfinals
(Cyprus) R Șerban	2	6	6
3	(Argentina) N Podoroska	6	3	4
(United States) A Krueger	6	4	7^{7}
(Australia) K Birrell	3	6	6^{2}

Semifinals
(Cyprus) R Șerban	7	7^{7}
(United States) A Krueger	5	6^{0}
