= 2023 Guanajuato Open – Doubles =

Doubles
- 2023 Guanajuato Open

Final
- Champions: (United States) Emina Bektas (United States) Ingrid Neel
- Runners-up: (United States) Quinn Gleason (France) Elixane Lechemia
- Score: 7–6^{(7–4)}, 3–6, [10–6]

Events
Singles	Doubles
← 2022 ·	Guanajuato Open	· 2024 →

Kaitlyn Christian and Lidziya Marozava were the defending champions but chose not to participate.

Emina Bektas and Ingrid Neel won the title, defeating Quinn Gleason and Elixane Lechemia in the final, 7–6^{(7–4)}, 3–6, [10–6].

== Seeds ==
1. (United States) Emina Bektas / (United States) Ingrid Neel (champions)
2. (United States) Anna Rogers / (Australia) Olivia Tjandramulia (semifinals)
3. (Mexico) Fernanda Contreras / (Australia) Astra Sharma (semifinals)
4. (United States) Quinn Gleason / (France) Elixane Lechemia (final)

== Draw ==
=== Key ===
- Q = Qualifier
- WC = Wild card
- LL = Lucky loser
- Alt = Alternate
- SE = Special exempt
- PR = Protected ranking
- ITF = ITF entry
- JE = Junior exempt
- w/o = Walkover
- r = Retired
- d = Defaulted
- SR = Special ranking

First round
1	(United States) E Bektas (United States) I Neel	6	7
(Poland) W Falkowska (Israel) L Glushko	2	5
(France) E Cascino (Netherlands) S Lamens	6	6
(United States) A Reami (Mexico) AS Sánchez	1	4
3	(Mexico) F Contreras (Australia) A Sharma	6	6
(Colombia) Y Lizarazo (Colombia) MP Pérez	2	4
(Indonesia) B Gumulya (United States) A Zhu	6^{5}	2
(Mexico) M Zacarías (Mexico) R Zarazúa	7^{7}	6
(United States) K Day (United States) J Loeb	6	6^{8}	[8]
(Greece) D Papamichail (Cyprus) R Șerban	2	7^{10}	[10]
(United States) J Aney (Colombia) M Herazo González	1	1
4	(United States) Q Gleason (France) E Lechemia	6	6
E Avanesyan; K Rakhimova	6	6
(Mexico) J Hinojosa Gómez (Mexico) V Rodríguez	0	2
(Lithuania) J Mikulskytė (Switzerland) C Perrin	6^{3}	6^{2}
2	(United States) A Rogers (Australia) O Tjandramulia	7^{7}	7^{7}

Quarterfinals
1	(United States) E Bektas (United States) I Neel	6	4	[10]
(France) E Cascino (Netherlands) S Lamens	2	6	[6]
3	(Mexico) F Contreras (Australia) A Sharma	6	6^{5}	[10]
(Mexico) M Zacarías (Mexico) R Zarazúa	4	7^{7}	[4]
(Greece) D Papamichail (Cyprus) R Șerban
4	(United States) Q Gleason (France) E Lechemia	w/o
E Avanesyan; K Rakhimova	5	3
2	(United States) A Rogers (Australia) O Tjandramulia	7	6

Semifinals
1	(United States) E Bektas (United States) I Neel	6^{3}	6	[10]
3	(Mexico) F Contreras (Australia) A Sharma	7^{7}	4	[6]
4	(United States) Q Gleason (France) E Lechemia	6	6
2	(United States) A Rogers (Australia) O Tjandramulia	2	4

Final
1	(United States) E Bektas (United States) I Neel	7^{7}	3	[10]
4	(United States) Q Gleason (France) E Lechemia	6^{4}	6	[6]
