= Jule Niemeier =

German tennis player (born 1999)

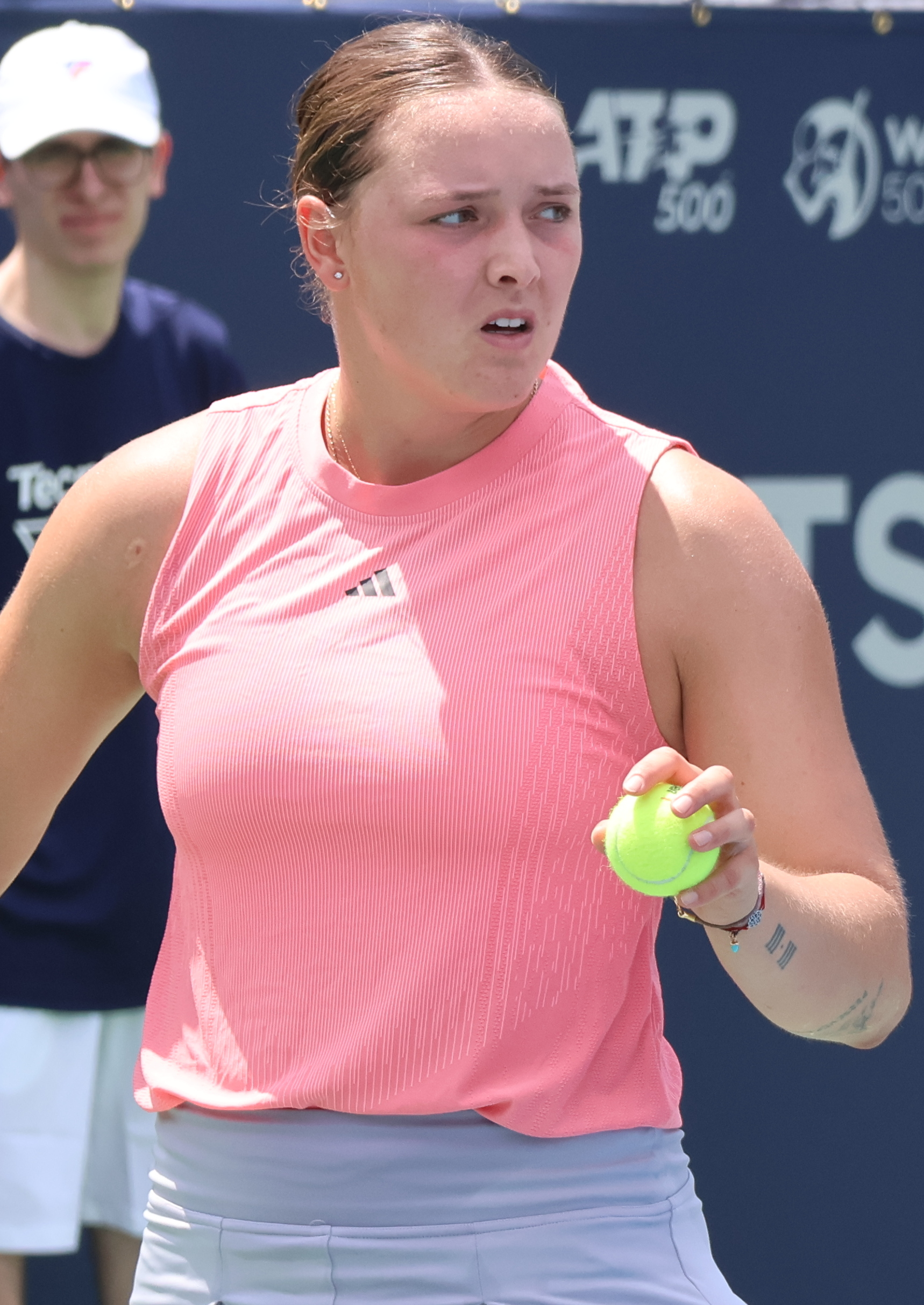
- Niemeier at the 2024 Mubadala Citi DC Open
- Country (sports): Germany
- Born: 12 August 1999 (age 27) Dortmund, Germany
- Height: 1.78 m (5 ft 10 in)
- Turned pro: 2016
- Plays: Right-handed (two-handed backhand)
- Prize money: US $2,484,356

Singles
- Career record: 235–185
- Career titles: 1 WTA 125
- Highest ranking: No. 61 (7 November 2022)
- Current ranking: No. 415 (3 August 2026)

Grand Slam singles results
- Australian Open: 2R (2025)
- French Open: 1R (2022, 2023, 2024)
- Wimbledon: QF (2022)
- US Open: 4R (2022)

Doubles
- Career record: 8–17
- Career titles: 0
- Highest ranking: No. 418 (14 August 2023)
- Current ranking: No. 1141 (3 August 2026)

Grand Slam doubles results
- French Open: 1R (2023)
- Wimbledon: 2R (2022)

Team competitions
- BJK Cup: 1R (2024), RR (2021, 2023)
- Last updated on: 6 August 2026.

Jule Niemeier (born 12 August 1999) is a German professional tennis player. She has a career-high WTA singles ranking of world No. 61, achieved on 7 November 2022.

== Career ==
=== 2018–2020: WTA debut ===
She made her WTA Tour main-draw debut as a wildcard at the 2018 Nürnberger Versicherungscup in doubles, partnering Lara Schmidt. She made her singles main-draw debut at the 2019 Nürnberger Versicherungscup, as a qualifier.

=== 2021: Two WTA semifinals ===
As a qualifier, Niemeier secured her first WTA Tour main draw wins at the Internationaux de Strasbourg, reaching the semifinals, where she lost in three sets to fifth seed and eventual champion Barbora Krejčíková.

Having received a wildcard entry, she also made the semifinals at the Hamburg European Open, losing to Andrea Petkovic. As a result, she entered top 150 at world No. 140 on 12 July 2021.

On her Grand Slam tournament qualifying competition debut at Wimbledon, Niemeier reached the third round but lost to Lesley Pattinama Kerkhove in three sets.

=== 2022: Wimbledon quarterfinal, first WTA 125 title ===
At the French Open, Niemeier qualified to make her Grand Slam main-draw debut, losing in the first round to Sloane Stephens in three sets.

She won her first WTA 125 tournament title at the Makarska International Championships, defeating Elisabetta Cocciaretto in the final.

Making her main-draw debut at Wimbledon, Niemeier reached her first Grand Slam quarterfinal after defeating Wang Xiyu, second seed Anett Kontaveit Lesia Tsurenko and Heather Watson. In the quarterfinal, she lost to compatriot Tatjana Maria in three sets.

At her US Open main-draw debut, she reached the fourth round, after defeating Sofia Kenin, Yulia Putintseva, and Zheng Qinwen, all in straight sets. In the fourth round, she lost to world No. 1, Iga Świątek, after winning the first set.

=== 2023: WTA 1000 debut & third round, Hamburg quarterfinal ===
Niemeier reached the third round of a WTA 1000 event at the Madrid Open, defeating Wang Xinyu and 10th seed Petra Kvitová, before losing to 24th seed Elise Mertens.

Ranked No. 120 at the WTA German Open, she qualified for the main draw and defeated fourth seed and defending champion Ons Jabeur for her third career top-10 win, and second on grass. She retired injured while trailing in next match against wildcard entrant Markéta Vondroušová.

Niemeier overcame 16th seed Karolina Muchova to reach the second round at Wimbledon, where she lost to Dalma Gálfi. Wins over Ella Seidel and sixth seed Yulia Putintseva saw her make it through to the quarterfinals at the Hamburg European Open. She was defeated in the last eight by Daria Saville.

=== 2024–2026: Major third round, loss of form, out of top 500 ===
Niemeier reached the semifinals at the WTA 125 Emilia-Romagna Open, defeating sixth seed María Lourdes Carlé, Ankita Raina and Zeynep Sönmez, before losing to fourth seed and eventual champion Anna Karolína Schmiedlová.

She qualified for the main draw at the French Open, but lost in the first round to Wang Xinyu, in three sets. Entering as a lucky loser at the Bad Homburg Open, she upset top seed Maria Sakkari for her third top 10 win on grass courts. Niemeier lost in the second round to Paula Badosa in three sets. At Wimbledon, she reached the second round with a win over Viktorija Golubic. She then lost to 21st seed Elina Svitolina.

Niemeier made the third round at the US Open for the second time, defeating 32nd Dayana Yastremska and Moyuka Uchijima. She lost to Zheng Qinwen, in straight sets.

== Performance timelines ==
Key
W	F	SF	QF	#R	RR	Q#	DNQ	A	NH

(W) winner; (F) finalist; (SF) semifinalist; (QF) quarterfinalist; (#R) rounds 4, 3, 2, 1; (RR) round-robin stage; (Q#) qualification round; (DNQ) did not qualify; (A) absent; (NH) not held; (SR) strike rate (events won / competed); (W–L) win–loss record.
To avoid confusion and double counting, these charts are updated at the conclusion of a tournament or when the player's participation has ended.

Only main-draw results in WTA Tour (incl. Grand Slams), Billie Jean King Cup, United Cup and Olympic Games are included in win–loss records.

=== Singles ===
Current through the 2026 WTA Tour.

Tournament	2019	2020	2021	2022	2023	2024	2025	2026	SR	W–L	Win%
Grand Slam tournaments
Australian Open	A	A	A	Q3	1R	Q2	2R	A	0 / 2	1–2	33%
French Open	A	A	A	1R	1R	1R	Q1	A	0 / 3	0–3	0%
Wimbledon	A	NH	Q3	QF	2R	2R	Q2	A	0 / 3	6–3	67%
US Open	A	A	Q2	4R	Q1	3R	Q2	A	0 / 2	5–2	71%
Win–loss	0–0	0–0	0–0	7–3	1–3	3–3	1–1	0–0	0 / 10	12–10	55%
National representation
BJK Cup	A	A	RR	PO	RR	1R	PO	A	0 / 3	2–5	29%
WTA 1000 tournaments
Qatar Open	NTI	A	NTI	A	NTI	A	Q1	A	0 / 0	0–0	–
Dubai Open	A	NTI	A	NTI	A	A	Q1	A	0 / 0	0–0	–
Indian Wells Open	A	NH	A	Q1	1R	A	1R	A	0 / 2	0–2	0%
Miami Open	A	NH	A	Q1	1R	Q2	Q1	A	0 / 1	0–1	0%
Madrid Open	A	NH	A	A	3R	Q2	Q2	A	0 / 1	2–1	67%
Italian Open	A	A	A	A	1R	Q1	Q2	A	0 / 1	0–1	0%
Canadian Open	A	NH	Q2	A	A	Q1	A	A	0 / 0	0–0	–
Win–loss	0–0	0–0	0–0	0–0	2–4	0–0	0–1	0–0	0 / 5	2–5	29%
Career statistics
Tournaments	1	0	5	12	19	10	5	1	Career total: 53		
Hard win–loss	0–0	0–0	0–2	6–5	3–13	4–5	1–3	0–0	0 / 23	14–28	33%
Clay win–loss	0–1	0–0	6–2	2–5	5–6	1–2	1–4	0–1	0 / 19	15–21	42%
Grass win–loss	0–0	0–0	0–1	5–3	2–3	3–4	0–0	0–0	0 / 11	10–11	48%
Overall win–loss	0–1	0–0	6–5	13–13	10–22	8–11	2–7	0–1	0 / 53	39–60	39%
Win %	0%	–	55%	50%	31%	42%	22%	0%	Career total: 39%		
Year-end ranking	296	280	130	61	162	92	242	449			

=== Doubles ===
Tournament	2018	2019	2020	2021	2022	2023	2024	2025	2026	SR	W–L	Win%
Grand Slam tournaments
Australian Open	A	A	A	A	A	A	A	A	A	0 / 0	0–0	–
French Open	A	A	A	A	A	1R	A	A	A	0 / 1	0–1	0%
Wimbledon	A	A	NH	A	2R	A	A	A	A	0 / 1	1–1	50%
US Open	A	A	A	A	A	A	A	A	A	0 / 0	0–0	–
Win–loss	0–0	0–0	0–0	0–0	1–1	0–1	0–0	0–0	0–0	0 / 2	1–2	33%
National representation
BJK Cup	A	A	A	RR	PO	RR	1R	PO	A	0 / 3	1–3	25%
WTA 1000 tournaments
Indian Wells Open	A	A	NH	A	A	A	A	1R	A	0 / 1	0–1	0%
Career statistics
Tournaments	1	1	0	0	3	3	1	1	0	Career total: 10		
Overall win–loss	0–1	0–1	0–0	0–1	2–3	2–2	1–1	0–2	0–0	0 / 10	5–11	31%
Year-end ranking	837	–	–	–	–	425	562	1009	1289			

== WTA Challenger finals ==
=== Singles: 1 (title) ===
Result	W–L	Date	Tournament	Surface	Opponent	Score
Win	1–0	Jun 2022	Makarska International, Croatia	Clay	(Italy) Elisabetta Cocciaretto	7–5, 6–1

== ITF Circuit finals ==
=== Singles: 9 (5 titles, 4 runner-ups) ===
Legend W100 tournaments (0–2) W60 tournaments (1–0) W50 tournaments (1–0) W25 tournaments (2–2) W15 tournaments (1–0)	Finals by surface Hard (0–1) Clay (5–3)

Result	W–L	Date	Tournament	Tier	Surface	Opponent	Score
Win	1–0	Jun 2018	ITF Kaltenkirchen, Germany	W15	Clay	(Israel) Vlada Ekshibarova	7–5, 6–2
Loss	1–1	Aug 2018	ITF Braunschweig, Germany	W25	Clay	(Czech Republic) Anastasia Zarycká	1–6, 3–6
Loss	1–2	Jul 2019	ITF Aschaffenburg, Germany	W25	Clay	(Greece) Despina Papamichail	2–6, 7–5, 2–6
Win	2–2	Aug 2019	ITF Leipzig, Germany	W25	Clay	(Germany) Katharina Gerlach	6–3, 6–3
Win	3–2	May 2021	ITF Prague Open, Czech Republic	W25	Clay	(Hungary) Dalma Gálfi	6–4, 6–2
Win	4–2	Apr 2022	Zagreb Ladies Open, Croatia	W60	Clay	(Hungary) Réka Luca Jani	6–2, 6–2
Loss	4–3	Feb 2024	Irapuato Open, Mexico	W100	Hard	(Canada) Rebecca Marino	1–6, 2–6
Loss	4–4	May 2024	Wiesbaden Open, Germany	W100	Clay	(Argentina) Julia Riera	6–3, 3–6, 2–6
Win	5–4	Aug 2026	ITF Knokke-Heist, Belgium	W50	Clay	(Slovakia) Irina Balus	6–1, 4–6, 6–1

== Wins over top-10 players ==
Niemeier has a 4–7 record against players who were, at the time the match was played, ranked in the top 10.

Season	2022	2023	2024	2025	2026	Total
Wins	1	2	1	0	0	4

#	Player	Rk	Event	Surface	Rd	Score	Rk
2022
1.	(Estonia) Anett Kontaveit	3	Wimbledon, United Kingdom	Grass	2R	6–4, 6–0	97
2023
2.	(Czech Republic) Petra Kvitová	10	Madrid Open, Spain	Clay	2R	7–6^{(11–9)}, 6–1	67
3.	(Tunisia) Ons Jabeur	6	German Open, Germany	Grass	1R	7–6^{(7–4)}, 6–4	120
2024
4.	(Greece) Maria Sakkari	9	Bad Homburg Open, Germany	Grass	1R	2–6, 6–2, 7–6^{(7–4)}	96

== National teams participation ==
=== Billie Jean King Cup (3–8) ===
Group membership Finals (0–4) Qualifying round (2–2) Play-offs (1–2)	Matches by type Singles (2–5) Doubles (1–3)

Date	Venue	Surface	Rd	Opponent nation	Score	Match type	Opponent player(s)	W/L	Match score
2020–21
Nov	Prague	Hard (i)	RR	Czech Republic	1–2	Doubles (w/ A-L Friedsam)	L Hradecká / K Siniaková	Loss	4–6, 7–6^{(7–2)}, [8–10]
2022
Apr	Astana	Clay (i)	QR	Kazakhstan	1–3	Doubles (w/ A-L Friedsam)	A Danilina / Z Kulambayeva	Win	6–2, 3–6, [10–6]
Nov	Rijeka	Hard (i)	PO	Croatia	3–1	Singles	Petra Marčinko	Loss	3–6, 2–6
Nov	Rijeka	Hard (i)	PO	Croatia	3–1	Singles	Ana Konjuh	Win	6–2, 6–1
2023
Apr	Stuttgart	Clay (i)	QR	Brazil	3–1	Singles	Beatriz Haddad Maia	Win	7–6^{(7–3)}, 3–6, 6–2
Nov	Seville	Hard (i)	RR	France	0–3	Singles	Clara Burel	Loss	4–6, 3–6
Nov	Seville	Hard (i)	RR	France	0–3	Doubles (w/ L Siegemund)	C Garcia / K Mladenovic	Loss	7–5, 3–6, [1–10]
2024
Nov	Málaga	Hard (i)	1R	Great Britain	0–2	Singles	Emma Raducanu	Loss	4–6, 4–6
2025
Apr	The Hague	Clay (i)	QR	Netherlands	0–3	Singles	Eva Vedder	Loss	3–6, 1–6
Apr	The Hague	Clay (i)	QR	Great Britain	1–2	Singles	Sonay Kartal	Loss	4–6, 2–6
Nov	Ismaning	Hard (i)	PO	Turkey	1–2	Doubles (w/ A-L Friedsam)	A Aksu / Z Sönmez	Loss	6–2, 2–6, 4–6

=== United Cup (0–2) ===
Matches by type
Singles (0–2)
Mixed doubles (0–0)

Venue	Surface	Rd	Opponent nation	Score	Match type	Opponent player(s)	W/L	Match score
2023
Sydney	Hard	RR	Czech Republic	2–3	Singles	Marie Bouzková	Loss	2–6, 5–7
Sydney	Hard	RR	United States	0–5	Singles	Madison Keys	Loss	2–6, 3–6
