= 2025 Guanajuato Open =

Tennis tournament in Irapuato, Mexico

- Date: 27 October–2 November 2025
- Edition: 17th
- Category: ITF Women's World Tennis Tour
- Prize money: $100,000
- Surface: Hard / outdoor
- Location: Irapuato, Mexico

Champions

Singles
- (Canada) Marina Stakusic

Doubles
- (United States) Dalayna Hewitt / (United States) Victoria Hu
- Guanajuato Open

The 2025 Guanajuato Open is a professional tennis tournament on outdoor hard courts. It is the seventeenth edition of the Guanajuato Open which is part of the 2025 ITF Women's World Tennis Tour. It took place in Irapuato, Mexico, from 27 October to 2 November 2025.

== Champions ==
=== Singles ===
- (Canada) Marina Stakusic def. (United States) Elvina Kalieva, 6–2, 6–2

=== Doubles ===
- (United States) Dalayna Hewitt / (United States) Victoria Hu def. (Mexico) Victoria Rodríguez / (Mexico) Ana Sofía Sánchez, 6–4, 6–4

== Singles main draw entrants ==
=== Seeds ===
Top eight players by pre-event seeding
Country	Player	Rank^{1}	Seed
NED	Arantxa Rus	136	1
BEL	Hanne Vandewinkel	138	2
CAN	Marina Stakusic	140	3
MEX	Ana Sofía Sánchez	185	4
USA	Elizabeth Mandlik	215	5
ROU	Miriam Bulgaru	233	6
USA	Elvina Kalieva	234	7
BUL	Lia Karatancheva	307	8

- ^{1} Rankings are as of 20 October 2025.

=== Other entrants ===
The following players received wildcards into the singles main draw:

- (Mexico) Marianne Ángel
- (Mexico) Abril Cardenas Olivares
- (Mexico) Claudia Sofía Martínez Solís
- (Mexico) Ángeles Rodríguez-Rizo

The following players received entry from the qualifying draw:

- (Mexico) Midori Castillo Meza
- (United States) Dalayna Hewitt
- (Mexico) Jéssica Hinojosa Gómez
- (United States) Maya Iyengar
- (United States) Sophie Llewellyn
- (China) Mi Lan
- (Slovenia) Kristina Novak
- (The Bahamas) Simone Pratt
