= Guanajuato Open =

Annual tennis tournament in Irapuato, Mexico

- 2025 Guanajuato Open

ITF Women's Tour
- Event name: Guanajuato Open
- Location: Irapuato, Mexico
- Venue: Club de Golf Santa Margarita
- Category: ITF Women's World Tennis Tour
- Surface: Hard / Outdoor
- Draw: 32S/32Q/16D
- Prize money: $100,000

The Guanajuato Open is a tournament for professional female tennis players played on outdoor hardcourts. The event is classified as a $60,000+H ITF Women's World Tennis Tour tournament and has been held in Irapuato, Mexico, since 2007.

== Past finals ==
=== Singles ===
Year	Champion	Runner-up	Score
2025	(Canada) Marina Stakusic	(United States) Elvina Kalieva	6–2, 6–2
2024	(Canada) Rebecca Marino	(Germany) Jule Niemeier	6–1, 6–2
2023	Kamilla Rakhimova	(Cyprus) Raluca Șerban	6–0, 1–6, 6–2
2022	(China) Zhu Lin	(Canada) Rebecca Marino	6–4, 6–1
2021	Tournament cancelled due to the coronavirus pandemic		
2020	Tournament abandoned due to the coronavirus pandemic		
2019	(Australia) Astra Sharma	(Paraguay) Verónica Cepede Royg	6–7^{(3–7)}, 6–4, 6–3
2018	(Czech Republic) Marie Bouzková	(Slovakia) Kristína Kučová	6–4, 6–0
2017	(Israel) Deniz Khazaniuk	(Russia) Sofya Zhuk	walkover
2016	(Canada) Françoise Abanda	(Netherlands) Lesley Kerkhove	6–2, 6–4
2015	(United States) Alexa Glatch	(Czech Republic) Renata Voráčová	6–2, 7–5
2014	(Netherlands) Indy de Vroome	(Japan) Naomi Osaka	3–6, 6–4, 6–1
2013	(Serbia) Aleksandra Krunić	(Ukraine) Olga Savchuk	7–6^{(7–4)}, 6–4
2012	(Netherlands) Kiki Bertens	(Kazakhstan) Yaroslava Shvedova	6–4, 2–6, 6–1
2011	(New Zealand) Marina Erakovic	(Slovenia) Andreja Klepač	7–5, 6–4
2010	(Australia) Monique Adamczak	(Japan) Misaki Doi	7–6^{(7–5)}, 2–6, 6–2
2009	(South Africa) Chanelle Scheepers	(Russia) Natalia Ryzhonkova	6–1, 7–5
2008	(Colombia) Mariana Duque Mariño	(Czech Republic) Nikola Fraňková	6–4, 3–6, 6–3
2007	(Brazil) Maria Fernanda Alves	(Colombia) Viky Núñez Fuentes	6–3, 7–5

=== Doubles ===
Year	Champions	Runners-up	Score
2025	(United States) Dalayna Hewitt (United States) Victoria Hu	(Mexico) Victoria Rodríguez (Mexico) Ana Sofía Sánchez	6–4, 6–4
2024	(United States) Hailey Baptiste (United States) Whitney Osuigwe	(United States) Ann Li (Canada) Rebecca Marino	7–5, 6–4
2023	(United States) Emina Bektas (United States) Ingrid Neel	(United States) Quinn Gleason (France) Elixane Lechemia	7–6^{(7–4)}, 3–6, [10–6]
2022	(United States) Kaitlyn Christian; Lidziya Marozava	Anastasia Tikhonova (Latvia) Daniela Vismane	6–0, 6–2
2021	Tournament cancelled due to the coronavirus pandemic		
2020	Tournament abandoned due to the coronavirus pandemic		
2019	(New Zealand) Paige Hourigan (Australia) Astra Sharma	(Paraguay) Verónica Cepede Royg (Czech Republic) Renata Voráčová	6–1, 4–6, [12–10]
2018	(Chile) Alexa Guarachi (New Zealand) Erin Routliffe	(United States) Desirae Krawczyk (Mexico) Giuliana Olmos	4–6, 6–2, [10–6]
2017	(United States) Desirae Krawczyk (Mexico) Giuliana Olmos	(United States) Ronit Yurovsky (Mexico) Marcela Zacarías	6–1, 6–0
2016	(Ukraine) Lyudmyla Kichenok (Ukraine) Nadiia Kichenok	(Japan) Akiko Omae (India) Prarthana Thombare	6–1, 6–4
2015	(Mexico) Victoria Rodríguez (Mexico) Marcela Zacarías	(Japan) Ayaka Okuno (Mexico) Ana Sofía Sánchez	6–1, 7–5
2014	(Netherlands) Indy de Vroome (United States) Denise Muresan	(Russia) Irina Khromacheva (Germany) Anna Zaja	6–4, 5–7, [10–7]
2013	(Russia) Alla Kudryavtseva (Ukraine) Olga Savchuk	(Serbia) Aleksandra Krunić (Switzerland) Amra Sadiković	4–6, 6–2, [10–6]
2012	(Slovakia) Janette Husárová (Hungary) Katalin Marosi	(Italy) Maria Elena Camerin (Ukraine) Mariya Koryttseva	6–2, 6–7^{(9–11)}, [10–7]
2011	(Hungary) Tímea Babos (Australia) Johanna Konta	(United States) Macall Harkins (Austria) Nicole Rottmann	6–3, 6–4
2010	(Argentina) María Irigoyen (Argentina) Florencia Molinero	(United States) Lena Litvak (Russia) Natalia Ryzhonkova	6–7^{(3–7)}, 6–2, [10–7]
2009	(Argentina) Jorgelina Cravero (Argentina) Verónica Spiegel	(Argentina) Soledad Esperón (South Africa) Chanelle Scheepers	6–1, 6–0
2008	(United Kingdom) Sarah Borwell (United States) Robin Stephenson	(Switzerland) Stefania Boffa (Czech Republic) Nikola Fraňková	6–4, 3–6, [10–4]
2007	(United States) Courtney Nagle (United States) Robin Stephenson	(Mexico) Lorena Arias (Mexico) Erika Clarke	6–1, 6–3
