= Rebecca Marino =

Canadian tennis player (born 1990)

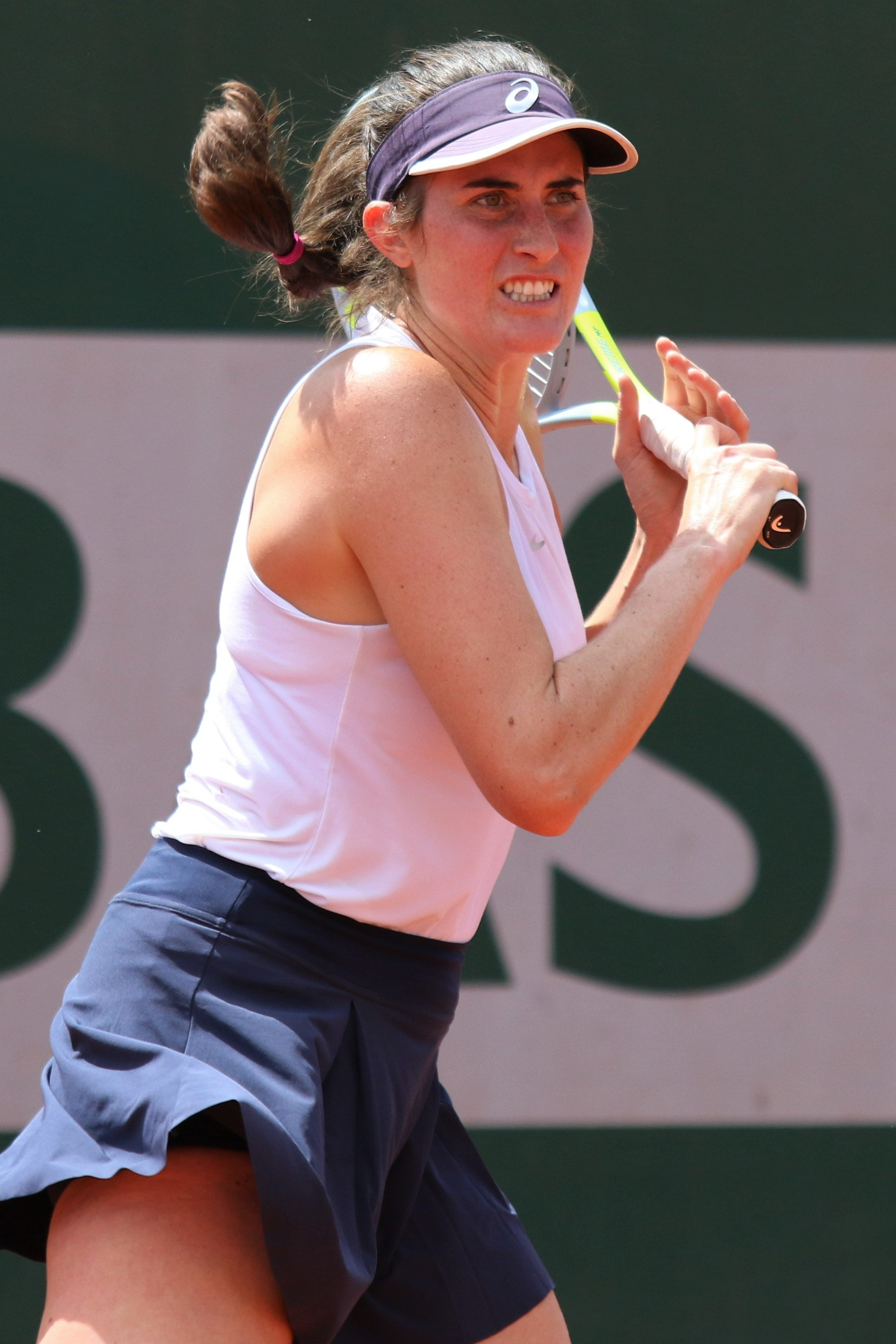
- Marino at the 2022 French Open
- Full name: Rebecca Catherine Marino
- Country (sports): Canada
- Residence: Vancouver, British Columbia
- Born: December 16, 1990 (age 35) Toronto, Ontario
- Height: 1.83 m (6 ft 0 in)
- Turned pro: 2008
- Plays: Right (two-handed backhand)
- College: UBC Thunderbirds
- Prize money: US$ 2,542,422

Singles
- Career record: 395–258
- Career titles: 1 WTA 125, 16 ITF
- Highest ranking: No. 38 (11 July 2011)
- Current ranking: No. 630 (28 September 2026)

Grand Slam singles results
- Australian Open: 2R (2011, 2021)
- French Open: 3R (2011)
- Wimbledon: 2R (2011)
- US Open: 3R (2022)

Doubles
- Career record: 92–116
- Career titles: 2 WTA 125, 3 ITF
- Highest ranking: No. 156 (21 March 2022)

Grand Slam doubles results
- Australian Open: 1R (2012, 2023)
- French Open: 1R (2011, 2023)
- Wimbledon: 1R (2011)
- US Open: 1R (2011)

Grand Slam mixed doubles results
- Wimbledon: 1R (2011)

Team competitions
- BJK Cup: RR (2022), record 8–11
- Last updated on: 1 October 2026.

Rebecca Catherine Marino (born December 16, 1990) is a Canadian tennis player. On 11 July 2011, she reached her best WTA singles ranking of No. 38. Marino was awarded Female Player of the Year by Tennis Canada two times, in 2010 and 2011.

She decided in late February 2013 to take an indefinite break from tennis and studied English literature at the University of British Columbia where she was also part of the rowing team. She was also a certified Club Pro 1 coach at the UBC Tennis Centre. In October 2017, Marino announced her intention to return to the pro circuit but her comeback was delayed due to ITF administrative regulations. She was eligible to return at the end of January 2018 and won the title in her first tournament back, a 15k in Antalya, Turkey.

== Early life ==
Rebecca Marino was born in Toronto to Joe Marino, owner of the construction firm Marino General Contracting, and Catherine Hungerford. The family moved to Vancouver before she turned two. Her father was of Italian descent. Marino's uncle, George Hungerford, won gold for Canada at the 1964 Summer Olympics in rowing. She has a younger brother named Steven, who also competed in rowing at the University of California, Berkeley. At five, Marino's mother signed her up for badminton. Before long, a tennis coach convinced her to switch racquets and she started playing tennis at age 10. At only 14, she won Vancouver's premier amateur tennis tournament, the Stanley Park Open, becoming the tournament's youngest champion in 75 years. From August 2008 to April 2009, she trained in Davos, Switzerland with German coach Nina Nittinger. Later in 2009, she moved to Montreal to train at the National Training Centre.

== Career ==
=== 2005–09: Early years ===
Marino played the first professional event of her career at the 25k Vancouver Open in August 2005, losing in qualifying. In August 2006, she lost in the qualifying first round of the Rogers Cup as a wildcard. Marino won in August 2008 her first singles title at Trecastagni and two in doubles, respectively, in Evansville, Indiana in July and in Southlake, Texas in October of the same year. In November 2008, she won her first WTA Tour main-draw match at the Challenge Bell as a qualifier, defeating Jill Craybas in the first round. She was defeated by Galina Voskoboeva in the second round. In September 2009 at the Challenge Bell, Marino reached the second round for the second straight year with a win over Lauren Albanese, but lost her next match to Julia Görges.

=== 2010: Breakthrough ===
Marino played the first major of her career at the US Open in August. After winning three qualifying matches to enter the main draw, she beat Ksenia Pervak to set up a second round clash with world No. 4, Venus Williams. She lost after a close first set which ended in a tiebreak. After the match, Venus said: "It seemed like every time I had an opening she came up with a big serve, so I guess I know what it is like now playing myself." Her next tournament was in Quebec City at the Challenge Bell where she beat fellow Canadian Heidi El Tabakh in the first round. Marino upset top-seeded and world No. 14, Marion Bartoli, in straight sets in the second round, which was her first career win against a top-20 player. She lost her quarterfinal match against Bethanie Mattek-Sands. Staying in the province of Québec, she played at the 50k Saguenay Challenger the following week. Marino made it to the final and defeated Alison Riske in three tough sets to win the tournament, the second singles title of her career. She won her second straight 50k event two weeks later in Kansas City by defeating Edina Gallovits in the final. Marino won her third straight 50k in Troy where she defeated Ashley Weinhold. In November, she lost in the semifinals of the 50k Toronto Challenger against Alizé Lim, who stopped her winning streak at 18.

=== 2011: WTA Tour final and career-high ranking of No. 38 ===
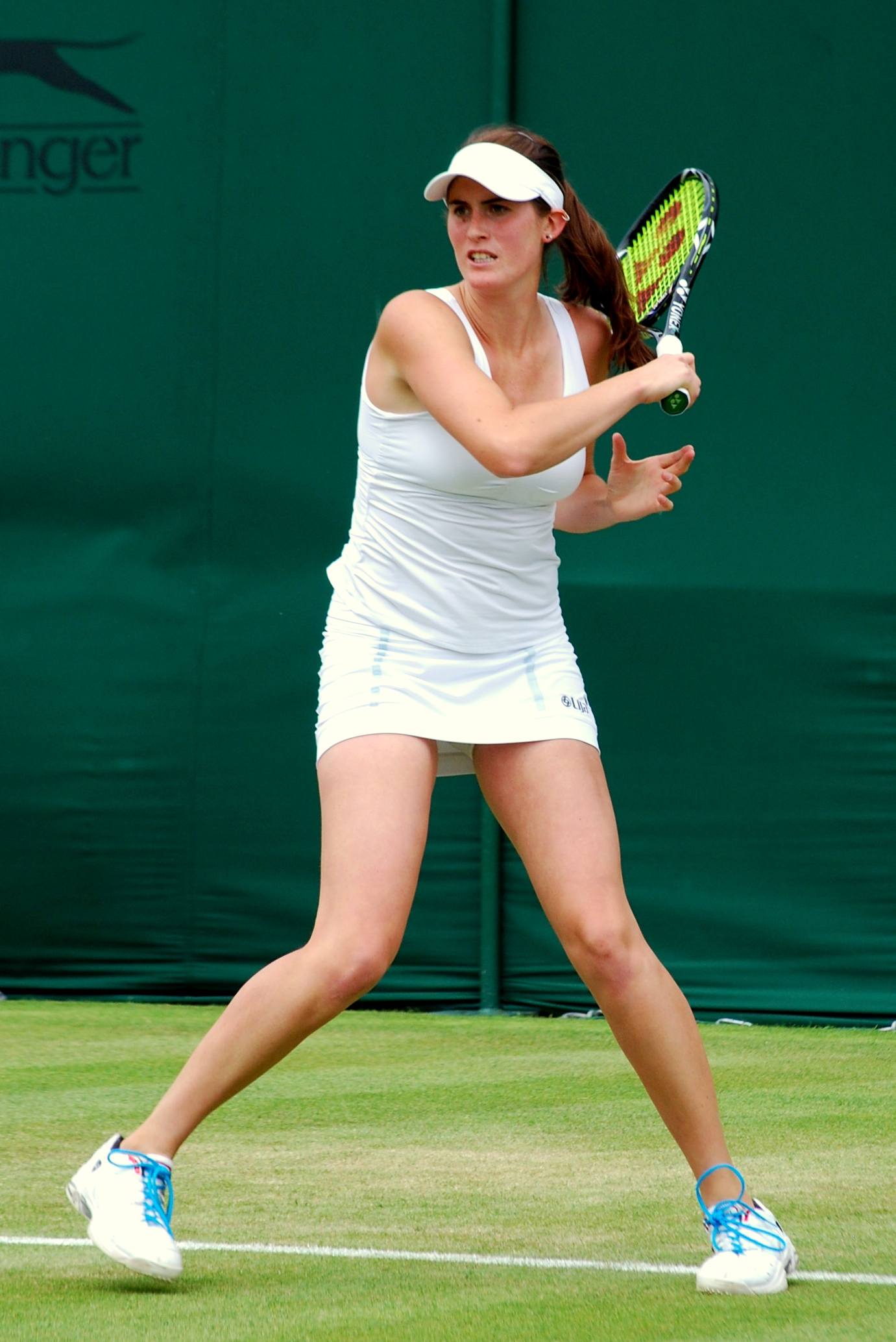
Rebecca Marino at the 2011 Wimbledon Championships

At the Australian Open in January, Marino defeated Junri Namigata in the first round. She lost in the second round against sixth seed Francesca Schiavone with a score of 7–9 in the final set. In February, Marino reached her first WTA final at the event in Memphis, where she faced Magdaléna Rybáriková. She was forced to retire from the match after losing the first set because of an abdominal strain. Marino qualified for the Indian Wells Open in March, but lost in the first round to Ekaterina Makarova. Following her first round exit, Marino took part in the inaugural $100k Bahamas Women's Open. As the fourth seed, she defeated qualifier Sophie Ferguson in the first round, Pauline Parmentier, and another qualifier, Heather Watson to reach the semifinals, where she lost against fifth seeded Angelique Kerber. At the French Open in May, she won her first round match over Kateryna Bondarenko and her second round match against María José Martínez Sánchez. She lost against 13th seed Svetlana Kuznetsova in the third round, her best Grand Slam performance so far. The following month, she reached the second round for her fourth straight major at Wimbledon where she lost to Roberta Vinci. At the US Open in August, Marino lost for the first time in the first round of a major to Gisela Dulko. In September, she reached the quarterfinals of the Challenge Bell for the second straight year, after beating fellow Canadians Stéphanie Dubois and Aleksandra Wozniak in the first and second round, respectively, but lost to Michaëlla Krajicek. At the last tournament of her season, the Luxembourg Open in October, she surprised the second seed and No. 15 player in the world Anastasia Pavlyuchenkova in the first round which was the second win in her career over a top-20 player. She lost her second-round match against qualifier Bibiane Schoofs.

=== 2012–13: Breaks from tennis ===
In January 2012, Marino lost in the first round of the Australian Open to Gréta Arn. She took a break from tennis to deal with mental and physical fatigue from February 2012 to late August 2012. Marino made a comeback the second week of September 2012 at the 25k in Redding, California, losing in the second round to Sachie Ishizu. The next month, in only her fifth tournament since coming back, she defeated fellow Canadian Sharon Fichman to win the 25k in Rock Hill, South Carolina as a qualifier. She then lost a week later in the first round of the 50k Saguenay Challenger to Maria Sanchez, stopping her winning streak at eight matches. In November 2012, at the 50k Toronto Challenger, Marino was forced to retire in her second round match, after suffering an abdominal strain. She was supposed to end her season the next week at the 75k event in Phoenix, but had to withdraw following her injury.

At the Australian Open in January 2013, her first Grand Slam championship since coming back, Marino made it to the main draw with her protected ranking of 115, but lost to Peng Shuai in the opening round. After playing some ITF and WTA Tour tournaments, she decided in late February 2013 to take a second break from tennis with no timetable for her return.

=== 2017–18: Return to competition ===
Marino started training again during the first week of September 2017 and decided to return to competition in October 2017, after being away from the game for nearly five years. She was scheduled to play the 60k Saguenay Challenger but her comeback was delayed by three months due to ITF administrative regulations. She returned at a 15k event in Antalya at the end of January 2018 and won the title in her first tournament back, not losing a set along the way. The next week, she won her second straight title at a 15k in Antalya, without losing a set once again. Again in Antalya the week after, she captured her third 15k event in a row. Playing her fourth straight tournament in Antalya, the first on clay, Marino lost her quarterfinal match, ending her winning-streak at 19 matches. At her next tournament in March, a 25k tournament in Kōfu, she reached the quarterfinals as a qualifier but was defeated by world No. 101, Luksika Kumkhum, in three sets. In April at the 25k in Osaka, she advanced to her fourth final of the season where she lost to Destanee Aiava.

=== 2021: Another comeback to the tour ===
Marino began the season using a protected ranking to gain entry into the qualifying tournament for the Australian Open, held in Dubai mid-January. She qualified for her first Grand Slam tournament in ten years, defeating Jaqueline Cristian, Viktoriya Tomova and Maryna Zanevska without dropping a set. She was granted direct entry into the Gippsland Trophy, one of three makeshift WTA Tour lead-up tournaments created for the participants of the upcoming Australian Open, also held in Melbourne, but lost in the first round to Jasmine Paolini.

Marino won her first round match at the Australian Open defeating Kimberly Birrell, before losing her next match to Markéta Vondroušová. At the Phillip Island Trophy, she defeated Mona Barthel, before losing in the second round to fourth seed Petra Martić.

In July she won the 25k event in Evansville, Indiana, overcoming Mayo Hibi in the final.

Partnering Liang En-shuo, Marino won her first WTA 125 doubles title at the LTP Women's Open, defeating to Erin Routliffe and Aldila Sutjiadi in the final which went to a deciding champions tiebreak.

=== 2022–23: US Open third round ===
Entering the main-draw as a qualifier, Marino recorded wins over wins over wildcard entrant Venus Williams and Andrea Petkovic to reach the third round at the 2022 Washington Open, at which point her run was ended by Daria Saville. The following week at the Championnats de Granby, she defeated wildcard entrant Victoria Mboko and third seed Jasmine Paolini to make it through to the quarterfinals, where she lost to 10th seed Marta Kostyuk.

At the 2022 US Open, Marino reached the third round for the first time at this major, and only a second time at this level, defeating Magdalena Fręch and Daria Snigur, before losing to Zhang Shuai.

Seeded seventh at the 2022 Chennai Open, she overcame Anna Blinkova and Katarzyna Kawa to make it into the quarterfinals, at which point she lost to third seed Magda Linette.

Having gained entry to the main draw as a lucky loser, Marino reached the quarterfinals at the grass-court 2023 Birmingham Classic with wins over qualifiers Wang Xiyu and Emina Bektas, both in three sets, before losing to Zhu Lin in a last eight match that also went to a deciding set.

=== 2024: First WTA 125 singles and second doubles titles ===
Ranked No. 182, Marino qualified for the Australian Open main draw, making her seventh appearance at this major. She lost in the first round to fifth seed Jessica Pegula.

In February, entering as the sixth seed, Marino won the title at the W100 Guanajuato Open. Losing only one set in the tournament, she upset fourth seed Jule Niemeier in straight sets in the final.

Marino qualified for the WTA 250 Nottingham Open in June, defeating Viktorija Golubic in the first round, before losing her next match to third seed and eventual champion Katie Boulter. The following week she won her first grass-court title at the W100 Ilkley Trophy, defeating Jessika Ponchet in three sets in the final.

In October, she won her third ITF title of the season at the W75 Calgary Challenger, dropping just one set in the entire tournament to fellow Canadian Cadence Brace in the semifinals, before defeating qualifier Anna Rogers in the final.

Partnering Carmen Corley, Marino won her second WTA 125 doubles title at the Tampico tournament, defeating Alina Korneeva and Polina Kudermetova in the final.

Playing as the sixth seed, in her final individual tournament of the year, Marino secured the biggest title of her career to date at the WTA 125 Midland Tennis Classic in Michigan. After losing just one set all week with wins over qualifier Robin Anderson, Louisa Chirico, Alina Korneeva and eighth seed Lesia Tsurenko, she defeated the third-seeded American Alycia Parks in straight sets in the final.

=== 2025: Ilkley final ===
Marino started her 2025 season at the Auckland Open, where she defeated fourth seed Lulu Sun in the first round, before losing her next match to Bernarda Pera. She gained direct entry into the Australian Open thanks to her WTA ranking, but was eliminated in the opening round by 22nd seed Katie Boulter.

In June, Marino fell just short of defending her title at the Ilkley Open, losing the final of the newly elevated WTA 125 event to Iva Jovic in straight sets.

Awarded a wildcard into the main-draw at the Canadian Open, she defeated qualifier Elsa Jacquemot to reach the second round, at which point she lost to eighth seed Emma Navarro.

Having qualified for the main draw at the US Open, Marino lost to fellow Canadian and 31st seed Leylah Fernandez in the first round.

== Performance timeline ==
Key
W	F	SF	QF	#R	RR	Q#	P#	DNQ	A	Z#	PO	G	S	B	NMS	NTI	P	NH

(W) winner; (F) finalist; (SF) semifinalist; (QF) quarterfinalist; (#R) rounds 4, 3, 2, 1; (RR) round-robin stage; (Q#) qualification round; (P#) preliminary round; (DNQ) did not qualify; (A) absent; (Z#) Davis/Fed Cup Zonal Group (with number indication) or (PO) play-off; (G) gold, (S) silver or (B) bronze Olympic/Paralympic medal; (NMS) not a Masters tournament; (NTI) not a Tier I tournament; (P) postponed; (NH) not held; (SR) strike rate (events won / competed); (W–L) win–loss record.
To avoid confusion and double counting, these charts are updated at the conclusion of a tournament or when the player's participation has ended.

Only main-draw results in WTA Tour, Grand Slam tournaments, Fed Cup/Billie Jean King Cup and Olympic Games are included in win–loss records.

=== Singles ===
Current through the 2025 Wimbledon Championships.

Tournament	2006	2007	2008	2009	2010	2011	2012	2013	...	2018	2019	2020	2021	2022	2023	2024	2025	W–L	Win %
Grand Slam tournaments
Australian Open	A	A	A	A	Q1	2R	1R	1R		A	Q1	A	2R	1R	1R	1R	1R	2–8	20%
French Open	A	A	A	A	Q1	3R	A	A		A	Q2	A	Q1	1R	1R	Q2	Q1	2–3	40%
Wimbledon	A	A	A	A	Q1	2R	A	A		A	A	NH	A	1R	1R	Q1	Q1	1–3	25%
US Open	A	A	A	Q2	2R	1R	A	A		A	A	A	1R	3R	1R	Q2	1R	3–6	33%
Win–loss	0–0	0–0	0–0	0–0	1–1	4–4	0–1	0–1		0–0	0–0	0–0	1–2	2–4	0–4	0–1	0–2	8–20	29%
National representation
Billie Jean King Cup	A	A	A	A	A	WG2	A	A		A	WG2	RR		QR	W	QF		4–7	36%
WTA 1000
Qatar / Dubai Open (Note: The first Premier 5 event of the year has switched back and forth between the Dubai Tennis Championships and the Qatar Ladies Open since 2009. Dubai was classified as a Premier 5 event from 2009 to 2011 before being succeeded by Doha for the 2012–2014 period. In 2015, Dubai regained its Premier 5 status while Doha was demoted to Premier status. The Premier 5 tournaments were reclassified as WTA 1000 tournaments in 2021.)	NMS		A	A	A	A	A	A		A	A	A	A	A	Q2	A	A	0–0	–
Indian Wells Open	A	A	A	A	A	1R	A	A		A	A	NH	Q2	A	1R	A	Q1	0–2	0%
Miami Open	A	A	A	A	A	Q1	A	A		A	A	NH	A	1R	2R	A	Q1	1–2	33%
Madrid Open	NH			A	A	A	A	A		A	A	NH	A	A	2R	A	A	1–1	50%
Italian Open	A	A	A	A	A	A	A	A		A	A	A	A	A	A	A	A	0–0	–
Canadian Open	Q1	A	A	Q1	Q3	1R	A	A		Q2	A	NH	3R	1R	1R	1R	2R	3–6	33%
Cincinnati Open	NMS			A	A	1R	A	A		A	A	A	A	A	Q2	A	2R	1–2	33%
Guadalajara Open	NH													2R	NTI		2R	2–2	50%
Pan Pac. / Wuhan Open (Note: In 2014, the Pan Pacific Open was downgraded to a Premier event and replaced by the Wuhan Open. The Premier 5 tournaments were reclassified as WTA 1000 tournaments in 2021.)	A	A	A	A	A	1R	A	A		A	A	NH				A	A	0–1	0%
China Open	NMS			A	A	1R	A	A		A	A	NH			Q1	A	A	0–1	0%
Career statistics
	2006	2007	2008	2009	2010	2011	2012	2013	...	2018	2019	2020	2021	2022	2023	2024	2025	W–L	Win %
Tournaments	0	0	1	1	2	19	3	1		1	0	0	5	14	19			total: 66	
Titles	0	0	0	0	0	0	0	0		0	0	0	0	0	0			total: 0	
Finals	0	0	0	0	0	1	0	0		0	0	0	0	0	0			total: 1	
Hard win–loss	0–0	0–0	0–0	0–0	1–1	8–13	0–3	0–1		0–0	0–0	0–0	5–7	11–9	4–13			29–47	38%
Clay win–loss	0–0	0–0	0–0	0–0	0–0	2–3	0–0	0–0		0–0	0–2	0–0	0–0	0–1	1–2			3–8	27%
Grass win–loss	0–0	0–0	0–0	0–0	0–0	3–3	0–0	0–0		0–0	0–0	0–0	0–0	2–4	2–4			7–11	39%
Carpet win–loss	0–0	0–0	1–1	1–1	2–1	2–1	0–0	0–0		2–1	discontinued							8–5	62%
Overall win–loss	0–0	0–0	1–1	1–1	3–2	15–20	0–3	0–1		2–1	0–2	0–0	5–7	13–14	7–19			47–71	40%
Win %	–	–	50%	50%	60%	43%	0%	0%		67%	0%	–	42%	48%	27%			total: 40%	
Year-end ranking	–	954	340	182	101	63	428	–		186	286	311	144	64	176	103	180	$1,317,871	

=== Doubles ===
Tournament	2011	2012	...	2023	W–L
Grand Slam tournaments
Australian Open	A	1R		1R	0–2
French Open	1R	A		1R	0–2
Wimbledon	1R	A		A	0–1
US Open	1R	A		A	0–1
Win–loss	0–3	0–1		0–2	0–6

== WTA Tour finals ==
=== Singles: 1 (runner-up) ===
Legend WTA 250 (0–1)	Finals by surface Hard (0–1)

Result	Date	Tournament	Tier	Surface	Opponent	Score	
Loss	0–1	Feb 2011	National Indoors, United States	International (Note: The WTA International tournaments were reclassified as WTA 250 tournaments in 2021.)	Hard (i)	(Slovakia) Magdaléna Rybáriková	2–6, ret.

== WTA 125 finals ==
=== Singles: 2 (1 title, 1 runner-up) ===
Result	W–L	Date	Tournament	Surface	Opponent	Score
Win	1–0	Nov 2024	Midland Tennis Classic, United States	Hard	(United States) Alycia Parks	6–2, 6–1
Loss	1–1	Jun 2025	Ilkley Open, United Kingdom	Grass	(United States) Iva Jovic	1–6, 3–6

=== Doubles: 2 (2 titles) ===
Result	W–L	Date	Tournament	Surface	Partner	Opponents	Score
Win	1–0	Jul 2021	Charleston Pro, United States	Clay	(Chinese Taipei) Liang En-shuo	(New Zealand) Erin Routliffe (Indonesia) Aldila Sutjiadi	5–7, 7–5, [10–7]
Win	2–0	Oct 2024	Abierto Tampico, Mexico	Hard	(United States) Carmen Corley	Alina Korneeva; Polina Kudermetova	6–3, 6–3

== ITF Circuit finals ==
=== Singles: 25 (16 titles, 9 runner-ups) ===
Legend
$100,000 tournaments (2–0)
$50/60,000 tournaments (6–3)
$25,000 tournaments (4–4)
$10/15,000 tournaments (4–2)

Result	W–L	Date	Tournament	Tier	Surface	Opponent	Score
Loss	0–1	May 2008	ITF Landisville, United States	10,000	Hard	(United States) Kristie Ahn	3–6, 6–2, 3–6
Loss	0–2	Aug 2008	ITF London, United Kingdom	10,000	Hard	(United Kingdom) Anna Smith	3–6, 6–3, 5–7
Win	1–2	Aug 2008	ITF Trecastagni, Italy	10,000	Hard	(Italy) Alice Moroni	6–2, 6–2
Loss	1–3	Mar 2009	ITF Tenerife, Spain	25,000	Hard	(Russia) Elena Bovina	2–6, 4–6
Loss	1–4	Jul 2009	ITF Boston, US	50,000	Hard	(Netherlands) Michaëlla Krajicek	3–6, 4–6
Loss	1–5	Apr 2010	ITF Torhout, Belgium	50,000	Hard (i)	(Germany) Mona Barthel	6–2, 4–6, 2–6
Win	2–5	Sep 2010	Challenger de Saguenay, Canada	50,000	Hard (i)	(United States) Alison Riske	6–4, 6–7^{(4)}, 7–6^{(7)}
Win	3–5	Oct 2010	ITF Kansas City, US	50,000	Hard	(Romania) Edina Gallovits-Hall	6–7^{(4)}, 6–0, 6–2
Win	4–5	Oct 2010	Classic of Troy, US	50,000	Hard	(United States) Ashley Weinhold	6–1, 6–2
Win	5–5	Oct 2012	ITF Rock Hill, US	25,000	Hard	(Canada) Sharon Fichman	3–6, 7–6^{(5)}, 6–2
Win	6–5	Feb 2018	ITF Antalya, Turkey	15,000	Hard	(Romania) Cristina Ene	6–3, 6–3
Win	7–5	Feb 2018	ITF Antalya, Turkey	15,000	Hard	(Switzerland) Nina Stadler	6–1, 6–4
Win	8–5	Feb 2018	ITF Antalya, Turkey	15,000	Hard	(Italy) Gaia Sanesi	6–2, 6–1
Loss	8–6	Apr 2018	ITF Osaka, Japan	25,000	Hard	(Australia) Destanee Aiava	3–6, 6–7^{(2)}
Win	9–6	Jul 2018	ITF Winnipeg, Canada	25,000	Hard	(Israel) Julia Glushko	7–6^{(3)}, 7–6^{(4)}
Win	10–6	Sep 2018	ITF Lubbock, US	25,000	Hard	(United States) Robin Anderson	6–4, 6–1
Loss	10–7	Apr 2019	ITF Kashiwa, Japan	W25	Hard	(Ukraine) Daria Snigur	4–6, 2–6
Win	11–7	May 2019	Kurume Cup, Japan	W60	Carpet	(Japan) Yuki Naito	6–4, 7–6^{(0)}
Win	12–7	Jul 2021	Evansville Classic, US	W25	Hard	(Japan) Mayo Hibi	6–3, 3–6, 6–0
Loss	12–8	Feb 2022	ITF Cancún, Mexico	W25	Hard	(Czech Republic) Linda Fruhvirtová	3–6, 4–6
Win	13–8	Mar 2022	Arcadia Pro Open, US	W60	Hard	(United States) Alycia Parks	7–6^{(0)}, 6–1
Loss	13–9	Mar 2022	Guanajuato Open, Mexico	W60	Hard	(China) Zhu Lin	4–6, 1–6
Win	14–9	Feb 2024	Guanajuato Open, Mexico	W100	Hard	(Germany) Jule Niemeier	6–1, 6–2
Win	15–9	Jun 2024	Ilkley Trophy, UK	W100	Grass	(France) Jessika Ponchet	4–6, 6–1, 6–4
Win	16–9	Oct 2024	Calgary Challenger, Canada	W75	Hard (i)	(United States) Anna Rogers	7–5, 6–4

=== Doubles: 12 (3 titles, 9 runner-ups) ===
Legend
$100,000 tournaments (0–2)
$50/60,000 tournaments (0–4)
$25,000 tournaments (1–2)
$10,000 tournaments (2–1)

Result	W–L	Date	Tournament	Tier	Surface	Partner	Opponents	Score
Loss	0–1	Apr 2008	ITF Toluca, Mexico	10,000	Hard	(United States) Lena Litvak	(Argentina) Agustina Lepore (Portugal) Frederica Piedade	4–6, 2–6
Win	1–1	Jul 2008	ITF Evansville, US	10,000	Hard	(United States) Ellah Nze	(United States) Courtney Dolehide (United States) Kirsten Flower	7–5, 6–3
Win	2–1	Oct 2008	ITF Southlake, US	10,000	Hard	(United States) Beatrice Capra	(United States) Mary Gambale (United States) Elizabeth Lumpkin	3–6, 6–4, [10–6]
Loss	2–2	Feb 2009	ITF Sutton, UK	25,000	Hard (i)	(United Kingdom) Katie O'Brien	(United States) Raquel Kops-Jones (Czech Republic) Renata Voráčová	3–6, 3–6
Loss	2–3	Sep 2009	Challenger de Saguenay, Canada	50,000	Hard (i)	(Canada) Stéphanie Dubois	(Sweden) Sofia Arvidsson (France) Séverine Beltrame	3–6, 1–6
Loss	2–4	May 2010	ITF Caserta, Italy	25,000	Hard	(Italy) Nicole Clerico	(Belarus) Ekaterina Dzehalevich (France) Irena Pavlovic	3–6, 3–6
Loss	2–5	Sep 2010	Challenger de Saguenay, Canada	50,000	Hard (i)	(Canada) Heidi El Tabakh	(Argentina) Jorgelina Cravero (France) Stéphanie Foretz	3–6, 4–6
Win	3–5	Jul 2019	Challenger de Gatineau, Canada	W25	Hard	(Canada) Leylah Fernandez	(Chinese Taipei) Hsu Chieh-yu (Mexico) Marcela Zacarías	7–6^{(5)}, 6–3
Loss	3–6	Apr 2021	Bellinzona Ladies Open, Switzerland	W60	Clay	(Japan) Yuki Naito	(Kazakhstan) Anna Danilina (Georgia (country)) Ekaterine Gorgodze	5–7, 3–6
Loss	3–7	Feb 2024	Guanajuato Open, Mexico	W100	Hard	(United States) Ann Li	(United States) Hailey Baptiste (United States) Whitney Osuigwe	5–7, 4–6
Loss	3–8	May 2024	Kangaroo Cup, Japan	W100	Hard	(Australia) Kimberly Birrell	(Chinese Taipei) Liang En-shuo (China) Tang Qianhui	0–6, 3–6
Loss	3–9	Oct 2024	Templeton Pro Open, US	W75	Hard	(United States) Carmen Corley	(United States) Sophie Chang (United States) Rasheeda McAdoo	6–1, 2–6, [4–10]

== Head-to-head record ==
Marino's record against players who have been ranked in the top 10, with those who are active in boldface.

- Statistics correct as of 11 December 2023.

Player	Years	Record	Win %	Hard	Clay	Grass	Carpet
**Number 1 ranked players**							
(United States) **Venus Williams**	2010–22	1–1	50%	1–1	–	–	–
(Serbia) Ana Ivanovic	2011	0–1	0%	–	–	0–1	–
(Belarus) **Aryna Sabalenka**	2021	0–1	0%	0–1	–	–	–
(Germany) **Angelique Kerber**	2010–11	0–2	0%	0–2	–	–	–
Number 2 ranked players							
(Russia) Svetlana Kuznetsova	2011	0–1	0%	–	0–1	–	–
(Czech Republic) **Petra Kvitová**	2011	0–1	0%	0–1	–	–	–
Number 3 ranked players							
(Russia) Nadia Petrova	2011	0–1	0%	–	0–1	–	–
(Kazakhstan) **Elena Rybakina**	2019	0–1	0%	–	0–1	–	–
(Greece) **Maria Sakkari**	2022	0–1	0%	–	–	0–1	–
(Ukraine) **Elina Svitolina**	2021	0–1	0%	0–1	–	–	–
(United States) **Coco Gauff**	2022–23	0–2	0%	0–1	0–1	–	–
Number 4 ranked players							
(United Kingdom) Johanna Konta	2010	1–0	100%	1–0	–	–	–
(France) **Caroline Garcia**	2010–22	1–1	50%	1–1	–	–	–
(Italy) Francesca Schiavone	2011	0–1	0%	0–1	–	–	–
Number 5 ranked players							
(Canada) **Eugenie Bouchard**	2010	1–0	100%	1–0	–	–	–
(Latvia) **Jeļena Ostapenko**	2022	0–1	0%	–	–	0–1	–
(Czech Republic) **Markéta Vondroušová**	2019–23	0–3	0%	0–2	0–1	–	–
Number 7 ranked players							
(United States) **Madison Keys**	2021	1–0	100%	1–0	–	–	–
(France) Marion Bartoli	2010–11	1–1	50%	0–1	–	–	1–0
(Italy) Roberta Vinci	2011–12	0–3	0%	0–2	–	0–1	–
Number 8 ranked players							
(Russia) **Daria Kasatkina**	2023	0–1	0%	0–1	–	–	–
(Czech Republic) **Karolína Muchová**	2019	0–1	0%	–	0–1	–	–
(Russia) Ekaterina Makarova	2010–11	0–3	0%	0–3	–	–	–
Number 9 ranked players							
(United States) CoCo Vandeweghe	2011	2–0	100%	2–0	–	–	–
(Germany) Andrea Petkovic	2022	1–0	100%	1–0	–	–	–
(Switzerland) Timea Bacsinszky	2011	1–0	100%	1–0	–	–	–
(Germany) Julia Görges	2009	0–1	0%	–	–	–	0–1
Number 10 ranked players							
(Russia) Maria Kirilenko	2011	0–1	0%	0–1	–	–	–
**Total**	**2009–23**	**10–30**	**25%**	**9–19**	**0–6**	**0–4**	**1–1**

== Awards ==
- 2010 – Tennis Canada: Female Player of the Year
- 2011 – Tennis Canada: Female Player of the Year

== Homages and tributes ==
Since October 2026, the public tennis courts at Robson Park in Vancouver, Canada, Marino’s hometown, have been named in her honor.
