= Victoria Hu =

American tennis player

- Country (sports): United States
- Born: April 25, 2002 (age 24) Northborough, Massachusetts
- Plays: Right-handed
- Prize money: $132,036

Singles
- Career record: 178–168
- Career titles: 2 ITF
- Highest ranking: No. 262 (August 12, 2024)
- Current ranking: No. 546 (September 28, 2026)

Doubles
- Career record: 53–66
- Career titles: 1 ITF
- Highest ranking: No. 292 (January 5 2026)
- Current ranking: No. 378 (September 28, 2026)
- Last updated on: 29 September 2026.

Victoria Hu (born 25 April 2002) is an American tennis player.

Hu has a career-high singles ranking by the WTA of 262, achieved on 12 August 2024, and a best in doubles of world No. 292, achieved on 5 January 2026.

Hu played at the Princeton Tigers between 2021 and 2022 in the NCAA Tennis Championships.

== Career ==
Hu won her first W100 title at the 2025 Guanajuato Open in the doubles draw, partnering with Dalayna Hewitt.

== ITF Circuit finals ==
=== Singles: 5 (2 titles, 3 runner-ups) ===
Legend W35 tournaments (2–1) W15 tournaments (0–2)	Finals by surface Hard (2–3)

Result	W–L	Date	Tournament	Tier	Surface	Opponent	Score
Loss	0–1	Nov 2022	ITF Waco, United States	W15	Hard	(Slovakia) Martina Okáľová	3–6, 2–6
Loss	0–2	Nov 2022	ITF Santo Domingo, Dominican Republic	W15	Hard	(United Kingdom) Amelia Rajecki	3–6, 1–6
Win	1–2	May 2024	ITF Santo Domingo, Dom. Rep.	W35	Hard	(Bolivia) Noelia Zeballos	5–7, 6–3, 6–1
Win	2–2	May 2024	ITF Santo Domingo, Dom. Rep.	W35	Hard	(United States) Catherine Harrison	6–4, 6–7^{(6)}, 6–4
Loss	2–3	Jun 2024	ITF Wichita, United States	W35	Hard	(Canada) Cadence Brace	5–7, 6–4, 3–6

=== Doubles: 5 (1 title, 4 runner-ups) ===
Legend W100 tournaments (1–1) W40/50 tournaments (0–1) W25/35 tournaments (0–2)	Finals by surface Hard (1–2) Clay (0–2)

Result	W–L	Date	Tournament	Tier	Surface	Partner	Opponents	Score
Loss	0–1	Mar 2023	ITF Sopó, Colombia	W25	Clay	(Argentina) Melany Krywoj	(Argentina) Guillermina Naya (Argentina) Julia Riera	5–7, 4–6
Loss	0–2	Nov 2023	ITF Veracruz, Mexico	W40	Hard	(Argentina) Melany Krywoj	(United States) Dalayna Hewitt; Veronika Miroshnichenko	6–2, 3–6, [8–10]
Loss	0–3	Oct 2025	Tyler Pro Challenge, United States	W100	Hard	(United States) Eryn Cayetano	(Poland) Weronika Falkowska (United States) Dalayna Hewitt	2–6, 3–6
Win	1–3	Oct 2025	Guanajuato Open, Mexico	W100	Hard	(United States) Dalayna Hewitt	(Mexico) Victoria Rodríguez (Mexico) Ana Sofía Sánchez	6–4, 6–4
Loss	1–4	Jan 2026	ITF Weston, United States	W35	Clay	(United States) Hanna Chang	(China) Dang Yiming (China) You Xiaodi	3–6, 6–2, [8–10]
